= 2014 Final Four =

2014 Final Four may refer to:

- 2014 NCAA Men's Division I Basketball Tournament
- 2014 NCAA Women's Division I Basketball Tournament
