= ACC–Big Ten Women's Challenge =

US basketball tournament

The ACC–Big Ten Women's Challenge (or Big Ten–ACC Women's Challenge as it is called in alternating years) was an in-season NCAA Division I women's college basketball series established in 2007 that matches up teams from the Atlantic Coast Conference (ACC) and the Big Ten Conference. The challenge is identical in format to the men's ACC–Big Ten Challenge.

The ACC–Big Ten Women's Challenge occurs early in the season, typically around late November or early December. The games were hosted by each of the schools. Originally, 11 games were played in the challenge, meaning one team from the ACC did not play each challenge. Nebraska's entry to the Big Ten allowed all 12 teams in each conference to play in the challenge. However, conference expansion in 2013 and 2014 led the ACC to have 15 schools while the Big Ten had 14 schools, leaving one ACC team out of the challenge each season.

Many of the challenge games hosted by Big Ten schools are televised live by the Big Ten Network. Games hosted by ACC schools are televised by the ACC Network.

On November 28, 2022, amid ESPN losing its media rights to the Big Ten, it was announced that both the men's and women's series would be discontinued after the 2022–23 season. ESPN will arrange an ACC—SEC series as a replacement beginning in the 2023–24 season.

== Team records ==
The Maryland Terrapins are listed under both the ACC and Big Ten standings, as they were members of the ACC during the Challenge from 2007 to 2013 and the Big Ten since 2014.

=== Atlantic Coast Conference (11–1–3) ===
Institution	Wins	Loss	Win %
Boston College Eagles	5	7	.417
Clemson Tigers	4	6	.400
Duke Blue Devils	12	3	.800
Florida State Seminoles	13	2	.867
Georgia Tech Yellow Jackets	9	6	.600
Louisville Cardinals	5	3	.625
Maryland Terrapins (2007–2013)	7	0	1.000
Miami Hurricanes	6	7	.462
Notre Dame Fighting Irish	7	2	.778
North Carolina Tar Heels	10	5	.667
NC State Wolfpack	8	7	.533
Pittsburgh Panthers	3	5	.375
Syracuse Orange	4	5	.444
Virginia Cavaliers	6	8	.429
Virginia Tech Hokies	9	6	.600
Wake Forest Demon Deacons	4	8	.333
Overall	112	80	.583

=== Big Ten Conference (1–11–3) ===
Institution	Wins	Loss	Win %
Illinois Fighting Illini	5	10	.333
Indiana Hoosiers	9	6	.600
Iowa Hawkeyes	4	11	.267
Maryland Terrapins (2014–present)	6	2	.750
Michigan Wolverines	10	5	.667
Michigan State Spartans	6	9	.400
Minnesota Golden Gophers	6	9	.400
Nebraska Cornhuskers	4	7	.364
Northwestern Wildcats	7	8	.467
Ohio State Buckeyes	5	10	.333
Penn State Lady Lions	5	10	.333
Purdue Boilermakers	5	10	.333
Rutgers Scarlet Knights	2	6	.250
Wisconsin Badgers	6	9	.400
Overall	80	112	.417

== Results ==
=== 2022 ACC 8–6 ===
Date	Time	ACC Team	Big Ten Team	Score	Location	Television	Attendance	Leader
Nov. 30	5:00 p.m.	Pittsburgh	**Illinois**	71–92	Peterson Events Center • Pittsburgh, PA	ACCN	274	B1G (1–0)
Nov. 30	6:00 p.m.	Syracuse	**Purdue**	78–87	Mackey Arena • West Lafayette, IN	BTN	2,521	B1G (2–0)
Nov. 30	7:00 p.m.	**Boston College**	Rutgers	75–61	Conte Forum • Chestnut Hill, MA	RSN	465	B1G (2–1)
Nov. 30	7:00 p.m.	**Virginia**	Penn State	89–68	Bryce Jordan Center • University Park, PA	BTN+	1,823	Tied (2–2)
Nov. 30	7:30 p.m.	No. 18 Louisville	No. 4 **Ohio State**	77–96	KFC Yum! Center • Louisville, KY	ACCN	8,259	B1G (3–2)
Nov. 30	8:00 p.m.	**Wake Forest**	Minnesota	63–59	Williams Arena • Minneapolis, MN	BTN	2,177	Tied (3–3)
Dec. 1	5:00 p.m.	**Duke**	Northwestern	66–50	Cameron Indoor Stadium • Durham, NC	ACCN	1,089	ACC (4–3)
Dec. 1	6:00 p.m.	No. 6 North Carolina	No. 5 **Indiana**	63–87	Simon Skjodt Assembly Hall • Bloomington, IN	BTN	5,939	Tied (4–4)
Dec. 1	6:30 p.m.	No. 7 Notre Dame	No. 20 **Maryland**	72–74	Edmund P. Joyce Center • South Bend, IN	ESPN2	3,131	B1G (5–4)
Dec. 1	7:00 p.m.	No. 9 **Virginia Tech**	Nebraska	85–54	Cassell Coliseum • Blacksburg, VA	ACCN	2,651	Tied (5–5)
Dec. 1	7:30 p.m.	**Florida State**	Wisconsin	92–87	Kohl Center • Madison, WI	BTN+	3,035	ACC (6–5)
Dec. 1	8:00 p.m.	**Georgia Tech**	Michigan State	66–63	Breslin Center • East Lansing, MI	BTN	2,748	ACC (7–5)
Dec. 1	8:30 p.m.	No. 12 **NC State**	No. 10 Iowa	94–81	Carver–Hawkeye Arena • Iowa City, IA	ESPN2	8,250	ACC (8–5)
Dec. 1	9:00 p.m.	Miami (FL)	No. 17 **Michigan**	64–76	Watsco Center • Coral Gables, FL	ACCN	1,830	ACC (8–6)
**WINNERS ARE IN BOLD**. Game Times in EST. Clemson did not play due to the ACC having one more team than the B1G.

=== 2021 ACC 10–4 ===
Date	Time	ACC Team	Big Ten Team	Score	Location	Television	Attendance	Leader
Dec 1	6:00 p.m.	**Pittsburgh**	Rutgers	58–50	Peterson Events Center • Pittsburgh, PA	ACCN	1,390	ACC (1–0)
Dec 1	7:00 p.m.	Wake Forest	**Nebraska**	60–86	LJVM Coliseum • Winston-Salem, NC	RSN	501	Tied (1–1)
Dec 1	7:00 p.m.	Georgia Tech	**Purdue**	52–53	Mackey Arena • West Lafayette, IN	BTN	1,539	B1G (2–1)
Dec 1	7:30 p.m.	**Virginia Tech**	Wisconsin	70–60	Kohl Center • Madison, WI	BTN+	2,096	Tied (2–2)
Dec 1	8:00 p.m.	**Syracuse**	No. 18т Ohio State	97–91	Carrier Dome • Syracuse, NY	ACCN	847	ACC (3–2)
Dec 1	9:00 p.m.	**North Carolina**	Minnesota	82–76	Williams Arena • Minneapolis, MN	BTN	3,432	ACC (4–2)
Dec 2	6:00 p.m.	**Boston College**	Penn State	86–69	Conte Forum • Chestnut Hill, MA	ACCN	833	ACC (5–2)
Dec 2	6:00 p.m.	No. 24 **Notre Dame**	Michigan State	76–71	Breslin Center • East Lansing, MI	BTN	4,581	ACC (6–2)
Dec 2	7:00 p.m.	No. 10 **Louisville**	No. 12 Michigan	70–48	KFC Yum! Center • Louisville, KY	ESPN	7,309	ACC (7–2)
Dec 2	7:00 p.m.	No. 2т **NC State**	No. 6 Indiana	66–58	Simon Skjodt Assembly Hall • Bloomington, IN	ESPN2	5,242	ACC (8–2)
Dec 2	8:00 p.m.	Clemson	**Northwestern**	61–72	Littlejohn Coliseum • Clemson, SC	ACCN	502	ACC (8–3)
Dec 2	8:00 p.m.	Miami (FL)	No. 8 **Maryland**	74–82	Xfinity Center • College Park, MD	BTN	4,367	ACC (8–4)
Dec 2	8:00 p.m.	No. 25 **Florida State**	Illinois	67–58	State Farm Center • Champaign, IL	BTN+	1,027	ACC (9–4)
Dec 2	9:00 p.m.	**Duke**	No. 9 Iowa	79–64	Cameron Indoor Stadium • Durham, NC	ESPN	3,064	ACC (10–4)
**WINNERS ARE IN BOLD**. Game Times in EST. Virginia did not play due to the ACC having one more team than the B1G.

=== 2019 Big Ten 9–5 ===
Date	Time	ACC Team	Big Ten Team	Score	Location	Television	Attendance	Leader
Dec 4	6:00 PM	No. 21 Miami (FL)	No. 14 **Indiana**	58–45	Watsco Center • Coral Gables, FL	ACCN	848	B1G (1–0)
Dec 4	7:00 PM	Duke	**Nebraska**	83–79	Pinnacle Bank Arena • Lincoln, NE	BTN	4,013	B1G (2–0)
Dec 4	8:00 PM	Boston College	**Northwestern**	66–63	Welsh–Ryan Arena • Evanston, IL		610	B1G (3–0)
Dec 4	8:00 PM	Notre Dame	**Minnesota**	75–67	Edmund P. Joyce Center • South Bend, IN	ACCN	7,093	B1G (4–0)
Dec 4	9:00 PM	Clemson	**Iowa**	74–60	Carver–Hawkeye Arena • Iowa City, IA	BTN	5,884	B1G (5–0)
Dec 5	6:00 PM	**North Carolina**	Illinois	85–60	Carmichael Arena • Chapel Hill, NC	ACCN	2,116	B1G (5–1)
Dec 5	6:00 PM	Virginia	**Rutgers**	73–63	Louis Brown Athletic Center • Piscataway, NJ	BTN	1,597	B1G (6–1)
Dec 5	7:00 PM	**Georgia Tech**	Wisconsin	60–41	McCamish Pavilion • Atlanta, GA	ACCNX	1,016	B1G (6–2)
Dec 5	7:00 PM	No. 13 **NC State**	No. 9 Maryland	66–59	Reynolds Coliseum • Raleigh, NC	ESPN	4,033	B1G (6–3)
Dec 5	7:00 PM	Pittsburgh	**Penn State**	78–73	Bryce Jordan Center • University Park, PA		1,667	B1G (7–3)
Dec 5	7:00 PM	**Virginia Tech**	Purdue	67–54	Cassell Coliseum • Blacksburg, VA	ACCNX	1,282	B1G (7–4)
Dec 5	8:00 PM	No. 8 **Florida State**	No. 19 Michigan State	78–68	Donald L. Tucker Civic Center • Tallahassee, FL	ACCN	3,258	B1G (7–5)
Dec 5	8:00 PM	No. 2 Louisville	**Ohio State**	67–60	Value City Arena • Columbus, OH	BTN	3,807	B1G (8–5)
Dec 5	9:00 PM	Syracuse	No. 24 **Michigan**	84–76^{OT}	Crisler Center • Ann Arbor, MI	ESPN	1,832	B1G (9–5)
**WINNERS ARE IN BOLD**. Game Times in EST. Wake Forest did not play due to the ACC having one more team than the B1G.

=== 2018 ACC 8–6 ===
Date	Time	ACC Team	Big Ten Team	Score	Location	Television	Attendance	Leader
Nov 28	7:00 PM	**Clemson**	Illinois	69–67^{OT}	Littlejohn Coliseum • Clemson, SC		412	ACC (1–0)
Nov 28	7:00 PM	**Virginia Tech**	Rutgers	67–51	Cassell Coliseum • Blacksburg, VA	ACCN Extra	966	ACC (2–0)
Nov 28	7:00 PM	Wake Forest	**Indiana**	73–87	LJVM Coliseum • Winston-Salem, NC		397	ACC (2–1)
Nov 28	7:00 PM	Virginia	**Michigan State**	66–91	Breslin Center • East Lansing, MI	BTN	4,219	Tied (2–2)
Nov 28	9:00 PM	**Duke**	Wisconsin	60–53	Kohl Center • Madison, WI	BTN	3,483	ACC (3–2)
Nov 29	6:30 PM	Georgia Tech	**No. 7 Maryland**	54–67	Xfinity Center • College Park, MD	BTN	4,108	Tied (3–3)
Nov 29	7:00 PM	**No. 1 Notre Dame**	No. 14 Iowa	105–71	Edmund P. Joyce Center • South Bend, IN	ESPN2	7,968	ACC (4–3)
Nov 29	7:00 PM	**No. 5 Louisville**	Nebraska	85–68	KFC Yum! Center • Louisville, KY		7,334	ACC (5–3)
Nov 29	7:00 PM	**Florida State**	Penn State	87–58	Donald L. Tucker Civic Center • Tallahassee, FL	ACCN Extra	2,501	ACC (6–3)
Nov 29	7:00 PM	North Carolina	**Ohio State**	69–76	Value City Arena • Columbus, OH		4,997	ACC (6–4)
Nov 29	7:00 PM	No. 21 Miami (FL)	**Purdue**	63–74	Mackey Arena • West Lafayette, IN		5,831	ACC (6–5)
Nov 29	7:00 PM	**No. 13 NC State**	Michigan	66–55	Reynolds Coliseum • Raleigh, NC	ACCN Extra	2,782	ACC (7–5)
Nov 29	8:00 PM	**Pittsburgh**	Northwestern	52–49	Welsh-Ryan Arena • Evanston, IL		411	ACC (8–5)
Nov 29	8:30 PM	No. 12 Syracuse	**No. 20 Minnesota**	68–72	Williams Arena • Minneapolis, MN	BTN	4,178	ACC (8–6)
**WINNERS ARE IN BOLD**. Game Times in EST. Boston College did not play due to the ACC having one more team than the B1G.

=== 2017 ACC 10–4 ===
Date	Time	ACC Team	Big Ten Team	Score	Location	Television	Attendance	Leader
Nov 29	3:30 PM	**North Carolina**	Minnesota	88–83	Carmichael Arena • Chapel Hill, NC	ACCN Extra	6,822	ACC 1–0
Nov 29	6:00 PM	**No. 3 Notre Dame**	No. 22 Michigan	83–63	Crisler Arena • Ann Arbor, MI	BTN	3,100	ACC 2–0
Nov 29	7:00 PM	Virginia	**No. 15 Maryland**	60–59	John Paul Jones Arena • Charlottesville, VA	ACCN Extra	3,082	ACC 2–1
Nov 29	7:00 PM	Pittsburgh	**Wisconsin**	58–57	Peterson Events Center • Pittsburgh, PA	ACCN Extra	762	Tied 2–2
Nov 29	8:00 PM	**No. 13 Florida State**	Iowa	94–93	Carver–Hawkeye Arena • Iowa City, IA	BTN	4,202	ACC 3–2
Nov 30	6:00 PM	NC State	**Rutgers**	57–53	Louis Brown Athletic Center • Piscataway, NJ	BTN	1,215	Tied 3–3
Nov 30	7:00 PM	**Miami (FL)**	Michigan State	67–57	Watsco Center • Coral Gables, FL	ACCN Extra	1,062	ACC 4–3
Nov 30	7:00 PM	**Syracuse**	Northwestern	81–74	Carrier Dome • Syracuse, NY	ACCN Extra	1,167	ACC 5–3
Nov 30	7:00 PM	**No. 14 Duke**	No. 8 Ohio State	69–60	Cameron Indoor Stadium • Durham, NC	ESPN2	5,535	ACC 6–3
Nov 30	7:00 PM	Wake Forest	**Penn State**	68–58	Bryce Jordan Center • University Park, PA		2,329	ACC 6–4
Nov 30	7:00 PM	**Georgia Tech**	Purdue	68–55	McCamish Pavilion • Atlanta, GA	ACCN Extra	1,201	ACC 7–4
Nov 30	8:00 PM	**Virginia Tech**	Illinois	96–49	State Farm Center • Champaign, IL		1,339	ACC 8–4
Nov 30	8:00 PM	**No. 4 Louisville**	Indiana	72–59	Simon Skjodt Assembly Hall • Bloomington, IN	BTN	2,853	ACC 9–4
Nov 30	8:00 PM	**Clemson**	Nebraska	67–66	Pinnacle Bank Arena • Lincoln, NE		3,579	ACC 10–4
Home team is italicized. **WINNERS ARE IN BOLD**. Game Times in EST. Boston College did not play due to the ACC having one more team than the B1G.

=== 2016 ACC 9–5 ===
Date	Time	ACC Team	Big Ten Team	Score	Location	Television	Attendance	Leader
Nov 30	7:00 pm	Boston College	**Penn State**	60–56	Conte Forum • Chestnut Hill, MA	ACCN Extra	531	B1G 1–0
Nov 30	7:00 pm	No. 20 **Syracuse**	Michigan State	75–64	Carrier Dome • Syracuse, NY	ACCN Extra	768	Tie 1–1
Nov 30	7:00 pm	No. 8 **Florida State**	Minnesota	75–61	Williams Arena • Minneapolis, MN	BTN	2,213	ACC 2–1
Nov 30	7:00 pm	Pittsburgh	**Purdue**	67–61	Peterson Events Center • Pittsburgh, PA	ACCN Extra	702	Tie 2–2
Nov 30	8:00 pm	**Wake Forest**	Illinois	79–70	State Farm Center • Champaign, IL		1,243	ACC 3–2
Nov 30	9:00 pm	No. 1 **Notre Dame**	Iowa	73–58	Carver–Hawkeye Arena • Iowa City, IA	BTN	3,809	ACC 4–2
Dec 1	7:00 pm	Georgia Tech	**Michigan**	92–52	Hank McCamish Pavilion • Atlanta, GA	ACCN Extra	818	ACC 4–3
Dec 1	7:00 pm	**NC State**	Indiana	84–70	Reynolds Coliseum • Raleigh, NC	ACCN Extra	2,203	ACC 5–3
Dec 1	7:00 pm	**Virginia Tech**	Nebraska	76–67	Cassell Coliseum • Blacksburg, VA	ACCN Extra	2,292	ACC 6–3
Dec 1	7:00 pm	No. 18 **Miami**	No. 9 Ohio State	94–89^{OT}	Value City Arena • Columbus, OH	BTN	4,165	ACC 7–3
Dec 1	7:00 pm	**Duke**	Rutgers	68–32	Louis Brown Athletic Center • Piscataway, NJ		2,704	ACC 8–3
Dec 1	7:00 pm	**North Carolina**	Wisconsin	72–59	Kohl Center • Madison, WI		2,972	ACC 9–3
Dec 1	7:00 pm	No. 7 Louisville	No. 5 **Maryland**	78–72	KFC Yum! Center • Louisville, KY	ACCN Extra	7,816	ACC 9–4
Dec 1	9:00 pm	Virginia	**Northwestern**	69–60	Welsh-Ryan Arena • Evanston, IL	BTN	694	ACC 9–5
Home team is italicized. **WINNERS ARE IN BOLD**. Game Times in EST. Clemson did not play due to the ACC having one more team than the B1G.

=== 2015 Tied 7–7 ===
Date	Time	ACC Team	Big Ten Team	Score	Location	Television	Attendance	Leader
Dec 2	6:00 pm	North Carolina	No. 15 **Northwestern**	85–72	Carmichael Arena • Chapel Hill, NC	ESPN3	1,664	B1G 1–0
Dec 2	7:00 pm	**Miami**	Illinois	73–64	BankUnited Center • Coral Gables, FL	ESPN3	910	TIE 1–1
Dec 2	7:00 pm	Georgia Tech	**Indiana**	69–60	Assembly Hall • Bloomington, IN		2,222	B1G 2–1
Dec 2	7:00 pm	Virginia	**Iowa**	85–73	John Paul Jones Arena • Charlottesville, VA		3,360	B1G 3–1
Dec 2	7:00 pm	No. 20 Syracuse	No. 5 **Maryland**	82–64	Xfinity Center • College Park, MD	BTN	3,964	B1G 4–1
Dec 2	7:00 pm	No. 3 **Notre Dame**	No. 10 Ohio State	75–72	Edmund P. Joyce Center • South Bend, IN	ESPN3	8,609	B1G 4–2
Dec 2	7:00 pm	Wake Forest	**Wisconsin**	64–51	LJVM Coliseum • Winston-Salem, NC	ESPN3	382	B1G 5–2
Dec 3	6:00 pm	**Boston College**	Purdue	58–56	Mackey Arena • West Lafayette, IN	BTN	5,805	B1G 5–3
Dec 3	7:00 pm	Pittsburgh	**Michigan**	82–45	Crisler Center • Ann Arbor, MI		1,737	B1G 6–3
Dec 3	7:00 pm	**Louisville**	No. 19 Michigan State	85–78	Breslin Center • East Lansing, MI	ESPN2	5,721	B1G 6–4
Dec 3	7:00 pm	No. 14 **Duke**	Minnesota	84–64	Cameron Indoor Stadium • Durham, NC	ESPN3	3,617	B1G 6–5
Dec 3	7:00 pm	No. 13 **Florida State**	Rutgers	65–43	Donald L. Tucker Civic Center • Tallahassee, FL	ESPN3	2,699	TIE 6–6
Dec 3	8:00 pm	North Carolina State	**Nebraska**	88–67	Pinnacle Bank Arena • Lincoln, NE		5,151	B1G 7–6
Dec 3	8:00 pm	**Virginia Tech**	Penn State	64–59	Bryce Jordan Center • University Park, PA	BTN	2,897	TIE 7–7
**WINNERS ARE IN BOLD**. Game Times in EST. Clemson did not play due to the ACC having one more team than the B1G.

=== 2014 Tied 7–7 ===
Date	Time	ACC Team	Big Ten Team	Location	Television	Attendance	Winner	Leader
Wed, Dec. 3	6:00 PM	**#2 Notre Dame**	#15 Maryland	Memorial Coliseum • Fort Wayne, IN	ESPN3	9,189	Notre Dame 92–72	ACC (1–0)
Wed, Dec. 3	6:00 PM	Boston College	**Indiana**	Conte Forum • Chestnut Hill, MA		353	Indiana 76–67	Tied (1–1)
Wed, Dec. 3	6:00 PM	Wake Forest	**Michigan**	Crisler Center • Ann Arbor, MI		1,225	Michigan 83–69	Big Ten (2–1)
Wed, Dec. 3	6:00 PM	North Carolina State	**Minnesota**	Reynolds Coliseum • Raleigh, NC	ESPN3	1,535	Minnesota 60–55	Big Ten (3–1)
Wed, Dec. 3	6:00 PM	**Pittsburgh**	Ohio State	Value City Arena • Columbus, OH		3,777	Pittsburgh 78–74	Big Ten (3–2)
Wed, Dec. 3	6:00 PM	**Florida State**	Purdue	Mackey Arena • West Lafayette, IN		5,725	Florida State 67–64 OT	Tied (3–3)
Wed, Dec. 3	6:30 PM	#9 Duke	**#12 Nebraska**	Pinnacle Bank Arena • Lincoln, NE	BTN	7,571	Nebraska 60–54	Big Ten (4–3)
Wed, Dec. 3	7:00 PM	Virginia	**Illinois**	State Farm Center • Champaign, IL		1,253	Illinois 86–63	Big Ten (5–3)
Thurs., Dec. 4	6:00 PM	**#7 Louisville**	#22 Iowa	KFC Yum! Center • Louisville, KY	ESPN3	7,854	Louisville 86–52	Big Ten (5–4)
Thurs., Dec. 4	6:00 PM	**#21 Syracuse**	Penn State	Carrier Dome • Syracuse, NY		258	Syracuse 61–39	Tied (5–5)
Thurs., Dec. 4	6:00 PM	Virginia Tech	**Northwestern**	Cassell Coliseum • Blacksburg, VA		1,430	Northwestern 70–45	Big Ten (6–5)
Thurs., Dec. 4	6:00 PM	**#6 North Carolina**	#18 Rutgers	Louis Brown Athletic Center • Piscataway, NJ	BTN	2,028	North Carolina 96–93 2OT	Tied (6–6)
Thurs., Dec. 4	6:00 PM	Georgia Tech	**#16 Michigan State**	Breslin Center • East Lansing, MI		6,636	Michigan State 79–73 OT	Big Ten (7–6)
Thurs., Dec. 4	7:00 PM	**Miami (FL)**	Wisconsin	BankUnited Center • Coral Gables, FL		593	Miami (FL) 66–54	Tied (7–7)
Game Times in CST. Home team is italicized. Winners are in bold. First appearances for Louisville, a new member of the ACC, and Pittsburgh, left out of the 2013 edition in its first ACC season. First appearance for Maryland as a Big Ten member, after having left the ACC at the end of the 2013–14 season. Clemson did not participate due to their last place finish in the ACC during the 2013–14 season.

=== 2013 ACC 7–5 ===
Date	Time	ACC Team	Big Ten Team	Location	Television	Attendance	Winner	Leader
Wed, Dec. 4	5:00PM	**#18 North Carolina**	#15 Nebraska	Carmichael Arena • Chapel Hill, NC	ESPN3	1,534	North Carolina (75–62)	ACC (1–0)
Wed, Dec. 4	6:00PM	**#8 Maryland**	Ohio State	Comcast Center • College Park, MD		3,737	Maryland (67–55)	ACC (2–0)
Wed, Dec. 4	6:00PM	**Florida State**	Michigan State	Donald L. Tucker Center • Tallahassee, FL		1,813	Florida State (60–58)	ACC (3–0)
Wed, Dec. 4	6:00PM	Virginia Tech	**Indiana**	Assembly Hall • Bloomington, IN		2,210	Indiana (71–65)	ACC (3–1)
Wed, Dec. 4	6:00PM	**Georgia Tech**	Illinois	McCamish Pavilion • Atlanta, GA		670	Georgia Tech (93–69)	ACC (4–1)
Wed, Dec. 4	6:30PM	**#4 Notre Dame**	#10 Penn State	Bryce Jordan Center • University Park, PA	BTN	5,805	Notre Dame (77–67)	ACC (5–1)
Thurs., Dec. 5	5:30PM	**#2 Duke**	#16 Purdue	Cameron Indoor Stadium • Durham, NC		3,758	Duke (99–78)	ACC (6–1)
Thurs., Dec. 5	6:00PM	Virginia	**Michigan**	John Paul Jones Arena • Charlottesville, NC		3,250	Michigan (73–53)	ACC (6–2)
Thurs., Dec. 5	6:00PM	#22 Syracuse	**#25 Iowa**	Carver–Hawkeye Arena • Iowa City, IA	BTN	3,323	Iowa (97–91)	ACC (6–3)
Thurs., Dec. 5	6:30PM	**NC State**	Northwestern	Welsh-Ryan Arena • Evanston, IL		392	NC State (76–61)	ACC (7–3)
Thurs., Dec. 5	7:00PM	Boston College	**Wisconsin**	Kohl Center • Madison, WI		3,028	Wisconsin (74–59)	ACC (7–4)
Thurs., Dec. 5	8:00PM	Miami (FL)	**Minnesota**	Williams Arena • Minneapolis, MN	BTN	2,158	Minnesota (74–67)	ACC (7–5)
Game Times in CST. Rankings from ESPN Coaches Poll (11/23). First appearances for Notre Dame and Syracuse, which joined from the Big East Conference. Final appearance for Maryland as an ACC member, as it would leave for the Big Ten after the 2013–14 season. Clemson and Wake Forest, plus the other school that joined from the Big East, Pittsburgh, did not play. Clemson and Wake Forest had the two worst records out of the ACC teams during the 2012–13 season, and Pittsburgh had the worst Big East record in 2012–13 among the three teams that joined the ACC for 2013–14.

=== 2012 ACC 7–5 ===
Date	Time	ACC Team	Big Ten Team	Location	Television	Attendance	Winner	Leader
Wed, Nov. 28	7:00PM	**#25 North Carolina**	#16 Ohio State	Carmichael Auditorium • Chapel Hill, North Carolina	BTN	2765	North Carolina (57–54)	ACC (1–0)
Wed, Nov. 28	7:00PM	**RV Florida State**	RV Iowa	Donald L. Tucker Center • Tallahassee, FL		2389	Florida State (83–69)	ACC (2–0)
Wed, Nov. 28	7:00PM	**Virginia Tech**	Wisconsin	Cassell Coliseum • Blacksburg, VA		1832	Virginia Tech (47–38)	ACC (3–0)
Wed, Nov. 28	7:00PM	**#4 Duke**	Michigan	Crisler Center • Ann Arbor, MI	BTN	1515	Duke (71–54)	ACC (4–0)
Wed, Nov. 28	7:00PM	RV Georgia Tech	**#14 Purdue**	Mackey Arena • West Lafayette, IN	BTN	8013	Purdue (85–73)	ACC (4–1)
Wed, Nov. 28	7:00PM	Clemson	**Indiana**	Assembly Hall • Bloomington, IN		1847	Indiana (52–49)	ACC (4–2)
Wed, Nov. 28	7:00PM	Boston College	**Northwestern**	Conte Forum • Chestnut Hill, MA		504	Northwestern (67–63)	ACC (4–3)
Wed, Nov. 28	8:00PM	**#10 Maryland**	#23 Nebraska	Bob Devaney Sports Center • Lincoln, NE	BTN	6283	Maryland (90–71)	ACC (5–3)
Thurs., Nov. 29	7:00PM	North Carolina State	**Michigan State**	Reynolds Coliseum • Raleigh, NC		2143	Michigan State (68–51)	ACC (5–4)
Thurs., Nov. 29	7:05PM	**RV Miami**	#6 Penn State	Bank United Center • Coral Gables, FL	BTN	1286	Miami (69–65)	ACC (6–4)
Thurs., Nov. 29	8:00PM	**RV Virginia**	Minnesota	Williams Arena • Minneapolis, MN		2215	Virginia (90–68)	ACC (7–4)
Thurs., Nov. 29	8:00PM	Wake Forest	**Illinois**	Assembly Hall • Champaign, IL		1262	Illinois (95–82)	ACC (7–5)
Thurs., Nov. 29	Game Times in CST. Rankings from ESPN Coaches Poll (11/23).							

=== 2011 Tied 6–6 ===
Date	Time	ACC Team	Big Ten Team	Location	Television	Attendance	Winner	Leader
Wed, Nov. 30	6:30PM	#13 North Carolina	**#15 Penn State**	Bryce Jordan Center • University Park, PA	BTN	3,963	Penn State (103–84)	Big Ten (1–0)
Wed, Nov. 30	7:00PM	**#7 Maryland**	RV Michigan	Comcast Center • College Park, MD	BTN	4,013	Maryland (74–65)	Tied (1–1)
Wed, Nov. 30	7:00PM	**RV Georgia Tech**	RV Nebraska	Alexander Memorial Coliseum • Atlanta, GA		1,025	Georgia Tech (73–57)	ACC (2–1)
Wed, Nov. 30	8:00PM	NC State	**Northwestern**	Welsh-Ryan Arena • Evanston, IL		457	Northwestern (76–59)	Tied (2–2)
Wed, Nov. 30	8:00PM	Virginia Tech	**RV Iowa**	Carver–Hawkeye Arena • Iowa City, IA		4,798	Iowa (58–47)	Big Ten (3–2)
Wed, Nov. 30	8:00PM	Boston College	**Wisconsin**	Kohl Center • Madison, WI		3,671	Wisconsin (58–50)	Big Ten (4–2)
Wed, Nov. 30	8:30PM	Florida State	#18 **Ohio State**	Jerome Schottenstein Center • Columbus, OH	BTN	2,850	Ohio State (78–75)^{OT}	Big Ten (5–2)
Thurs., Dec. 1	6:30PM	**Wake Forest**	Minnesota	LJVM Coliseum • Winston-Salem, NC	BTN	358	Wake Forest (82–65)	Big Ten (5–3)
Thurs., Dec. 1	7:00PM	**Virginia**	Indiana	John Paul Jones Arena • Charlottesville, VA		2,751	Virginia (65–49)	Big Ten (5–4)
Thurs., Dec. 1	7:00PM	Clemson	**Illinois**	Littlejohn Coliseum • Clemson, SC		851	Illinois (61–50)	Big Ten (6–4)
Thurs., Dec. 1	7:00PM	**#6 Duke**	#16 Purdue	Cameron Indoor Stadium • Durham, NC	BTN	4,715	Duke (64–53)	Big Ten (6–5)
Thurs., Dec. 1	8:00PM	**#9 Miami**	Michigan State	Breslin Center • East Lansing, MI	BTN	5,712	Miami (76–60)	Tied (6–6)
Game Times in CST. Rankings from ESPN Coaches Poll (11/29).

=== 2010 ACC 6–5 ===
Date	Time	ACC Team	Big Ten Team	Location	Television	Attendance	Winner	Leader
Wed., Dec. 1	5:30PM	Wake Forest	**Michigan**	Crisler Arena • Ann Arbor, MI	BTN	1,588	Michigan (91–58)	Big Ten (1–0)
Wed., Dec. 1	6:00PM	#14 Florida State	#25 **Michigan State**	Donald L. Tucker Center • Tallahassee, FL		2,092	Michigan State (72–64)	Big Ten (2–0)
Wed., Dec. 1	6:00PM	**Georgia Tech**	Northwestern	Alexander Memorial Coliseum • Atlanta, GA		873	Georgia Tech (67–63)	Big Ten (2–1)
Wed., Dec. 1	7:30PM	**NC State**	Illinois	Assembly Hall • Champaign, IL	BTN	744	N.C. State (73–57)	Tied (2–2)
Thurs, Dec. 2	6:00PM	**RV Maryland**	RV Purdue	Mackey Arena • West Lafayette, IN	BTN	8,698	Maryland (56–55)	ACC (3–2)
Thurs, Dec. 2	6:00PM	Virginia	#**6 Ohio State**	Jerome Schottenstein Center • Columbus, OH		2,392	Ohio State (74–46)	Tied (3–3)
Thurs, Dec. 2	6:00PM	Clemson	**Indiana**	Littlejohn Coliseum • Clemson, SC		362	Indiana (65–51)	Big Ten (4–3)
Thurs, Dec. 2	6:00PM	#**15 North Carolina**	#18 Iowa	Carmichael Auditorium • Chapel Hill, NC		3,018	North Carolina (79–67)	Tied (4–4)
Thurs, Dec. 2	6:00PM	RV **Boston College**	RV Penn State	Conte Forum • Chestnut Hill, MA		557	Boston College (113–104)	ACC (5–4)
Thurs, Dec. 2	7:00PM	Virginia Tech	**Minnesota**	Williams Arena • Minneapolis, MN		2,709	Minnesota (63–58)	Tied (5–5)
Thurs, Dec. 2	7:30PM	#**5 Duke**	Wisconsin	Kohl Center • Madison, WI	BTN	4,298	Duke (59–51)	ACC (6–5)
Game Times in CST. Rankings from ESPN Coaches Poll (11/30). Miami did not play due to their last place finish in the ACC during the 2009–2010 season.

=== 2009 ACC 7–4 ===
ACC Team	Big Ten Team	Outcome	Location	ACC	B10
Georgia Tech	Penn State	GT 64–60	State College, Pennsylvania	**X**	
Wake Forest	Illinois	ILL 65–50	Winston-Salem, North Carolina		**X**
Boston College	Iowa	BC 72–67	Iowa City, IA	**X**	
Florida State	Indiana	FSU 82–74	Bloomington, Indiana	**X**	
Virginia Tech	Michigan	MICH 71–51	Blacksburg, Virginia		**X**
Maryland	Minnesota	MD 66–45	College Park, Maryland	**X**	
Duke	Ohio State	DUKE 83–67	Durham, North Carolina	**X**	
Virginia	Purdue	VA 56–49	Charlottesville, Virginia	**X**	
North Carolina State	Wisconsin	WISC 53–48	Raleigh, North Carolina		**X**
Clemson	Northwestern	CLEM 69–68	Evanston, Illinois	**X**	
North Carolina	Michigan State	MSU 72–66	East Lansing, Michigan		**X**
RESULT		ACC		7	4

Note: Miami did not play

=== 2008 ACC 7–4 ===
ACC Team	Big Ten Team	Outcome	Location	ACC	B10
Georgia Tech	Michigan State	GT 70–57	Atlanta	**X**	
North Carolina	Ohio State	UNC 72–63	Columbus, Ohio	**X**	
Florida State	Penn State	FSU 73–60	Tallahassee, Florida	**X**	
Clemson	Northwestern	CLEM 78–75 OT	Clemson, South Carolina	**X**	
Maryland	Purdue	UMD 70–59	West Lafayette, Indiana	**X**	
Boston College	Minnesota	MINN 80–60	Minneapolis		**X**
Virginia	Illinois	UVA 63–39	Champaign, Illinois	**X**	
Duke	Iowa	DUKE 71–47	Durham, North Carolina	**X**	
Virginia Tech	Wisconsin	WISC 61–52	Madison, Wisconsin		**X**
NC State	Michigan	MICH 63–52	Ann Arbor, Michigan		**X**
Miami	Indiana	IU 69–54	Miami		**X**
RESULT		ACC		7	4

Note: Wake Forest did not play

=== 2007 ACC 8–3 ===
ACC Team	Big Ten Team	Outcome	Location	ACC	B10
Miami	Michigan	MICH 65–50	Coral Gables, Florida		**X**
Wake Forest	Northwestern	WAKE 60–45	Evanston, Illinois	**X**	
Georgia Tech	Iowa	GT 76–57	Iowa City, IA	**X**	
North Carolina	Purdue	UNC 90–72	Chapel Hill, North Carolina	**X**	
Virginia Tech	Minnesota	VT 68–62	Blacksburg, Virginia	**X**	
NC State	Illinois	NCST 61–47	Raleigh, North Carolina	**X**	
Maryland	Ohio State	UMD 77–53	College Park, Maryland	**X**	
Clemson	Michigan State	MSU 68–51	East Lansing, Michigan		**X**
Virginia	Wisconsin	UVA 84–60	Charlottesville, Virginia	**X**	
Florida State	Indiana	FSU 85–78	Bloomington, Indiana	**X**	
Duke	Penn State	PSU 86–84	University Park, Pennsylvania		**X**
RESULT		ACC		8	3

Note: Boston College did not play
