= 2014 ACC women's basketball tournament =

- 2014 ACC Women's Basketball Tournament in Greensboro, NC
- Classification: Division I
- Season: 2013–14
- Teams: 15
- Site: Greensboro Coliseum; Greensboro, North Carolina
- Champions: Notre Dame (1st title)
- Winning coach: Muffet McGraw (1st title)
- MVP: Jewell Loyd (Notre Dame)
- Television: ESPN, ESPNU, ACCRSN

2013–14 ACC women's basketball standings
| | Conf. | | | | Overall |
| Team | W | | L | PCT | W | | L | PCT |
|---|---|---|---|---|---|---|---|---|
| No. 2 Notre Dame † | 16 | – | 0 | 1.000 | 37 | – | 1 | .974 |
| No. 9 Duke | 12 | – | 4 | .750 | 28 | – | 7 | .800 |
| No. 11 Maryland | 12 | – | 4 | .750 | 28 | – | 7 | .800 |
| No. 16 NC State | 11 | – | 5 | .688 | 25 | – | 8 | .758 |
| Syracuse | 10 | – | 6 | .625 | 23 | – | 10 | .697 |
| No. 12 North Carolina | 10 | – | 6 | .625 | 27 | – | 10 | .730 |
| Georgia Tech | 9 | – | 7 | .563 | 20 | – | 12 | .625 |
| Miami (FL) | 8 | – | 8 | .500 | 16 | – | 15 | .516 |
| Florida State | 7 | – | 9 | .438 | 21 | – | 12 | .636 |
| Virginia | 6 | – | 10 | .375 | 14 | – | 17 | .452 |
| Wake Forest | 5 | – | 11 | .313 | 15 | – | 16 | .484 |
| Virginia Tech | 4 | – | 12 | .250 | 14 | – | 16 | .467 |
| Clemson | 4 | – | 12 | .250 | 13 | – | 19 | .406 |
| Pittsburgh | 3 | – | 13 | .188 | 11 | – | 20 | .355 |
| Boston College | 3 | – | 13 | .188 | 12 | – | 19 | .387 |
† 2014 ACC tournament winner As of 8 April 2014; Rankings from AP poll

The 2014 Atlantic Coast Conference women's basketball tournament was the postseason women's basketball tournament for the Atlantic Coast Conference, held March 5–9, 2014, in Greensboro, North Carolina, at the Greensboro Coliseum. This was the first ACC Tournament to include 15 teams, a result of the conference adding Syracuse, Pitt, and Notre Dame, and also the last to involve Maryland, which will leave the ACC in July 2014 to join the Big Ten Conference.

== Seeds ==
2014 ACC women's basketball tournament seeds and results
| Seed | School | Conf. | Over. | Tiebreaker |
| 1 | ‡-Notre Dame | 16-0 | 29-0 | |
| 2 | †-Duke | 12-4 | 25-5 | 1-0 vs. Maryland |
| 3 | †-Maryland | 12-4 | 24-5 | 0-1 vs. Duke |
| 4 | †-NC State | 11-5 | 24-6 | |
| 5 | #-Syracuse | 10-6 | 21-8 | 1-0 v. North Carolina |
| 6 | #-North Carolina | 10-6 | 22-8 | 0-1 vs. Syracuse |
| 7 | #-Georgia Tech | 9-7 | 19-10 | |
| 8 | #-Miami (FL) | 8-8 | 16-13 | |
| 9 | #-Florida State | 7-9 | 19-10 | |
| 10 | Virginia | 6-10 | 13-16 | |
| 11 | Wake Forest | 5-11 | 14-15 | |
| 12 | Virginia Tech | 4-12 | 14-15 | 1-0 vs. Clemson |
| 13 | Clemson | 4-12 | 12-18 | 0-1 vs. Virginia Tech |
| 14 | Pittsburgh | 3-13 | 11-19 | 1-0 vs. Boston College |
| 15 | Boston College | 3-13 | 12-18 | 0-1 vs. Pitt |
‡ – ACC regular season champions, and tournament No. 1 seed. † – Received a double-bye in the conference tournament. # – Received a single-bye in the conference tournament. Overall records include all games played in the ACC Tournament.

== Schedule ==
| Session | Game | Time* | Matchup^{#} | Television | Attendance |
First round – Wednesday, March 5
| Opening day | 1 | 1 pm | #12 Virginia Tech vs #13 Clemson | ACCRSN | 4,440 |
| Opening day | 2 | 3:30 pm | #10 Virginia vs #15 Boston College | ACCRSN | 4,440 |
| Opening day | 3 | 6:30 pm | #11 Wake Forest vs #14 Pittsburgh | ACCRSN | 4,950 |
Second round – Thursday, March 6
| 1 | 4 | 11 am | #5 Syracuse vs #13 Clemson | ACCRSN | 4,026 |
| 1 | 5 | 2 pm | #8 Miami vs #9 Florida State | ACCRSN | 4,026 |
| 2 | 6 | 6 pm | #7 Georgia Tech vs #10 Virginia | ACCRSN | 5,941 |
| 2 | 7 | 8 pm | #6 North Carolina vs #11 Wake Forest | ACCRSN | 5,941 |
Quarterfinals – Friday, March 7
| 3 | 8 | noon | #4 NC State vs #5 Syracuse | ACCRSN | 4,506 |
| 3 | 9 | 2 pm | #1 Notre Dame vs #9 Florida State | ACCRSN | 4,506 |
| 4 | 10 | 6 pm | #2 Duke 82 vs #7 Georgia Tech | ACCRSN | 6,949 |
| 4 | 11 | 8 pm | #3 Maryland vs #6 North Carolina | ACCRSN | 6,949 |
Semifinals – Saturday, March 8
| 5 | 12 | 5 pm | #1 Notre Dame vs #4 NC State | ESPNU | 8,169 |
| 5 | 13 | 7:30 pm | Game #2 Duke vs #6 North Carolina | ESPNU | 8,169 |
Championship Game – Sunday, March 9
| 6 | 14 | 7 pm | #1Notre Dame vs #2 Duke | ESPN | 8,190 |
*Game Times in ET. #-Rankings denote tournament seed

== Bracket ==
First round Wednesday, March 5 ACCRSN
12 | Virginia Tech | 56
13 | Clemson | 69
10 | Virginia | 74
15 | Boston College | 59
11 | Wake Forest | 72
14 | Pittsburgh | 58

Second round Thursday, March 6 ACCRSN
8 | Miami | 67
9 | Florida State | 72^{OT}
5 | Syracuse | 63
13 | Clemson | 53
7 | Georgia Tech | 77
10 | Virginia | 76
6 | #13 North Carolina | 69
11 | Wake Forest | 65

Quarterfinals; Friday, March 7 ACCRSN
1 | #2 Notre Dame | 83
9 | Florida State | 57
4 | #14 NC State | 79
5 | Syracuse | 63
2 | #10 Duke | 82
7 | Georgia Tech | 52
3 | #8 Maryland | 70
6 | #13 North Carolina | 73

Semifinals; Saturday, March 8 ESPNU
1 | #2 Notre Dame | 83
4 | #14 NC State | 48
2 | #10 Duke | 66
6 | #13 North Carolina | 61

Championship game Sunday, March 9 ESPN
1 | #2 Notre Dame | 69
2 | #10 Duke | 53

^{OT} denotes overtime game

== Awards and honors ==
Tournament MVP: Jewell Loyd, Notre Dame

All-Tournament teams:

First Team
- Jewell Loyd, Notre Dame
- Kayla McBride, Notre Dame
- Elizabeth Williams, Duke
- Tricia Liston, Duke
- Diamond DeShields, North Carolina

Second Team

- Natalie Achonwa, Notre Dame
- Haley Peters, Duke
- Dearica Hamby, Wake Forest
- Natasha Howard, Florida State
- Alyssa Thomas, Maryland

== See also ==
- 2014 ACC men's basketball tournament
