= 2013–14 Boston College Eagles women's basketball team =

Intercollegiate basketball season

2013–14 Boston College Eagles women's basketball
- Conference: Atlantic Coast Conference
- Record: 12–19 (3–13 ACC)
- Head coach: Erik Johnson
- Assistant coaches: Yvonne Hawkins; Shelley Sheetz; Lisa Faulkner
- Home arena: Conte Forum

2013–14 ACC women's basketball standings
	Conf.				Overall
Team	W		L	PCT	W		L	PCT
No. 2 Notre Dame †	16	–	0	1.000	37	–	1	.974
No. 9 Duke	12	–	4	.750	28	–	7	.800
No. 11 Maryland	12	–	4	.750	28	–	7	.800
No. 16 NC State	11	–	5	.688	25	–	8	.758
Syracuse	10	–	6	.625	23	–	10	.697
No. 12 North Carolina	10	–	6	.625	27	–	10	.730
Georgia Tech	9	–	7	.563	20	–	12	.625
Miami (FL)	8	–	8	.500	16	–	15	.516
Florida State	7	–	9	.438	21	–	12	.636
Virginia	6	–	10	.375	14	–	17	.452
Wake Forest	5	–	11	.313	15	–	16	.484
Virginia Tech	4	–	12	.250	14	–	16	.467
Clemson	4	–	12	.250	13	–	19	.406
Pittsburgh	3	–	13	.188	11	–	20	.355
Boston College	3	–	13	.188	12	–	19	.387
† 2014 ACC tournament winner As of 8 April 2014; Rankings from AP poll

The 2013–14 Boston College Eagles women's basketball team represented Boston College during the 2013–14 NCAA Division I women's basketball season. The Eagles, led by second year head coach Erik Johnson, played their home games at the Conte Forum and are a members of the Atlantic Coast Conference.

== Roster ==
2013–14 Boston College Eagles women's basketball team
Players
Coaches

Pos.	#	Name	Height	Year	Previous school	Hometown
G	11	Nicole Boudreau	5 ft 9 in (1.75 m)	So	Andover	Andover, Mass.
G/F	20	Shayra Brown	5 ft 9 in (1.75 m)	Sr	Bishop Ford	Brooklyn, N.Y.
C	5	Amber Cooper	6 ft 4 in (1.93 m)	RS Fr	Vacaville Christian Academy (CA)	New Orleans, La.
G/F	44	Kat Cooper	6 ft 0 in (1.83 m)	Jr	Auburn Riverside	Tacoma, Wash.
F	13	Alexa Coulombe	6 ft 2 in (1.88 m)	So	Catherine McAuley	Falmouth, Maine
G/F	22	Emilee Daley	6 ft 1 in (1.85 m)	Fr	Rivers School	Sharon, Mass.
G/F	21	Kristen Doherty	5 ft 11 in (1.8 m)	Sr	Sachem East	Holtsville, N.Y.
G	15	Lauren Engeln	5 ft 11 in (1.8 m)	RS Jr	UConn	Laguna Hills, Calif.
F/C	25	Karima Gabriel	6 ft 2 in (1.88 m)	RS So	DePaul	Manchester, NH
G	23	Kelly Hughes	5 ft 11 in (1.8 m)	Fr	Point Pleasant Boro	Point Pleasant, NJ
F	32	Victoria Lesko	6 ft 2 in (1.88 m)	Jr	Rumson-Fair Haven	Rumson, N.J.
G	24	Kami Mickens	5 ft 5 in (1.65 m)	Fr	Southlake Carroll	Westlake, TX
F/C	45	Katie Zenevitch	6 ft 3 in (1.91 m)	Sr	Central Catholic	Methuen, Mass.

Head coach

Erik Johnson

Assistant coach(es)

Yvonne Hawkins
Shelley Sheetz
Lisa Faulkner

Legend

- (C) Team captain
- (S) Suspended
- (I) Ineligible
- (W) Walk-on
- Injured
- Current redshirt

Roster
Last update: 2013-08-17

== Schedule ==
Date time, TV	Rank^{#}	Opponent^{#}	Result	Record	Site (attendance) city, state
Regular Season
11/09/2013*; 1:00 pm		No. 3 Stanford	L 71–83	0–1	Conte Forum (1,628); Chestnut Hill, MA
11/12/2013*; 7:00 pm		at Hofstra	W 80–63	1–1	Hofstra Arena (1,376); Hempstead, NY
11/16/2013*; 6:00 pm		at BYU	L 69–71 ^{OT}	1–2	Marriott Center (703); Provo, UT
11/21/2013*; 7:00 pm		FIU	W 89–69	2–2	Conte Forum (450); Chestnut Hill, MA
11/28/2013*; 6:00 pm		vs. UNC Wilmington; Cancún Challenge	W 75–54	3–2	Moon Palace Golf & Spa Resort (505); Cancún, MX
11/29/2013*; 6:00 pm		vs. Iowa; Cancún Challenge	L 68–78	3–3	Moon Palace Golf & Spa Resort (934); Cancún, MX
11/30/2013*; 6:00 pm		vs. USC; Cancún Challenge	L 52–79	3–4	Moon Palace Golf & Spa Resort (934); Cancún, MX
12/05/2013*; 2:30 pm		at Wisconsin; ACC – Big Ten Women's Challenge	L 59–74	3–5	Kohl Center (3,028); Madison, WI
12/08/2013*; 1:00 pm		Hartford	W 65–45	4–5	Conte Forum (490); Chestnut Hill, MA
12/11/2013*; 7:00 pm		Boston University	W 63–52	5–5	Conte Forum (501); Chestnut Hill, MA
12/15/2013*; 3:00 pm		New Hampshire	W 65–40	6–5	Conte Forum (518); Chestnut Hill, MA
12/21/2013*; 5:00 pm		Holy Cross	W 77–60	7–5	Conte Forum (644); Chestnut Hill, MA
12/29/2013*; 3:00 pm, FS1		at Providence	W 80–71	8–5	Alumni Hall (682); Providence, RI
01/01/2014*; 1:00 pm		Mount St. Mary's	W 81–67	9–5	Conte Forum (891); Chestnut Hill, MA
01/05/2014; 1:00 pm, RSN		Virginia Tech	W 70–63	10–5 (1–0)	Conte Forum (645); Chestnut Hill, MA
01/09/2014; 7:00 pm		at No. 2 Notre Dame	L 53–95	10–6 (1–1)	Edmund P. Joyce Center (8,474); South Bend, IN
01/12/2014; 3:00 pm		at No. 3 Duke	L 57–78	10–7 (1–2)	Cameron Indoor Stadium (4,410); Durham, NC
01/16/2014; 7:00 pm		Miami (FL)	W 63–62	11–7 (2–2)	Conte Forum (721); Chestnut Hill, MA
01/19/2014; 1:00 pm		No. 9 North Carolina	L 56–73	11–8 (2–3)	Conte Forum (1,612); Chestnut Hill, MA
01/23/2014; 7:00 pm		at No. 23 NC State	L 76–85	11–9 (2–4)	Reynolds Coliseum (2,293); Raleigh, NC
01/26/2014; 1:00 pm		Wake Forest	L 50–56	11–10 (2–5)	Conte Forum (1,104); Chestnut Hill, MA
01/30/2014; 7:00 pm		at Pittsburgh	L 65–67	11–11 (2–6)	Peterson Events Center (1,021); Pittsburgh, PA
02/02/2014; 2:00 pm		at Virginia Tech	L 63–70	11–12 (2–7)	Cassell Coliseum (1,066); Blacksburg, VA
02/06/2014; 7:00 pm		Virginia	W 69–65	12–12 (3–7)	Conte Forum (532); Chestnut Hill, MA
02/09/2014; 1:00 pm, RSN		at Florida State	L 55–72	12–13 (3–8)	Donald L. Tucker Center (2,247); Tallahassee, FL
02/13/2014; 7:00 pm		No. 2 Notre Dame	L 61–82	12–14 (3–9)	Conte Forum (804); Chestnut Hill, MA
02/16/2014; 1:00 pm, RSN		Syracuse	L 47–71	12–15 (3–10)	Conte Forum (1,219); Chestnut Hill, MA
02/20/2014; 7:00 pm		at Clemson	L 67–72	12–16 (3–11)	Littlejohn Coliseum (744); Clemson, SC
02/27/2014; 7:00 pm		Maryland	L 66–92	12–17 (3–12)	Conte Forum (925); Chestnut Hill, MA
03/02/2014; 7:00 pm		at Georgia Tech	L 74–84	12–18 (3–13)	McCamish Pavilion (1,436); Atlanta, GA
2014 ACC women's basketball tournament
03/05/2014; 3:30 pm, FSN	(15)	vs. (10) Virginia; First round	L 65–69	12–19	Greensboro Coliseum (532); Greensboro, NC
*Non-conference game. ^{#}Rankings from AP Poll. (#) Tournament seedings in parentheses. All times are in Eastern Time.

== See also ==
2013–14 Boston College Eagles men's basketball team
