= 2013–14 Notre Dame Fighting Irish women's basketball team =

Intercollegiate basketball season

2013–14 Notre Dame Fighting Irish women's basketball

ACC tournament champions ACC regular season champions

NCAA tournament, Runner-Up
- Conference: Atlantic Coast Conference

Ranking
- Coaches: No. 2
- AP: No. 2
- Record: 37–1 (16–0 ACC)
- Head coach: Muffet McGraw
- Assistant coaches: Carol Owens; Beth Cunningham; Niele Ivey
- Home arena: Edmund P. Joyce Center

2013–14 ACC women's basketball standings
	Conf.				Overall
Team	W		L	PCT	W		L	PCT
No. 2 Notre Dame †	16	–	0	1.000	37	–	1	.974
No. 9 Duke	12	–	4	.750	28	–	7	.800
No. 11 Maryland	12	–	4	.750	28	–	7	.800
No. 16 NC State	11	–	5	.688	25	–	8	.758
Syracuse	10	–	6	.625	23	–	10	.697
No. 12 North Carolina	10	–	6	.625	27	–	10	.730
Georgia Tech	9	–	7	.563	20	–	12	.625
Miami (FL)	8	–	8	.500	16	–	15	.516
Florida State	7	–	9	.438	21	–	12	.636
Virginia	6	–	10	.375	14	–	17	.452
Wake Forest	5	–	11	.313	15	–	16	.484
Virginia Tech	4	–	12	.250	14	–	16	.467
Clemson	4	–	12	.250	13	–	19	.406
Pittsburgh	3	–	13	.188	11	–	20	.355
Boston College	3	–	13	.188	12	–	19	.387
† 2014 ACC tournament winner As of 8 April 2014; Rankings from AP poll

The 2013–14 Notre Dame Fighting Irish women's basketball team represented University of Notre Dame during the 2013–14 NCAA Division I women's basketball season. The Fighting Irish, led by twenty-seventh year head coach Muffet McGraw, played their home games at the Purcell Pavilion at the Joyce Center and were 1st year members of the Atlantic Coast Conference. They finished the season with 37–1 overall, 16–0 in ACC play to win both of the ACC Regular Season and Tournament. They earned an automatic bid to the 2014 NCAA Division I women's basketball tournament where they defeated Robert Morris in the first round, Arizona State in the second round, Oklahoma State in the Sweet Sixteen, and Baylor in the Elite Eight to make it to their sixth Final Four, where they defeated Maryland. In the championship game, they lost to Connecticut, ending their school-record 37-game win streak.

== Roster ==
2013–14 Notre Dame Fighting Irish women's basketball team
Players
Coaches

Pos.	#	Name	Height	Year	Previous school	Hometown
F	11	Natalie Achonwa	6 ft 3 in (1.91 m)	Sr	St. Mary's Catholic	Guelph, ON
G	15	Lindsay Allen	5 ft 7 in (1.7 m)	Fr	St. John's College	Mitchellville, MD
F	44	Ariel Braker	6 ft 1 in (1.85 m)	Sr	Grosse Pointe North	Grosse Pointe Woods, MI
G	22	Madison Cable	5 ft 11 in (1.8 m)	Jr	Mt. Lebanon	Mt. Lebanon, PA
G	3	Whitney Holloway	5 ft 4 in (1.63 m)	Jr	Montini Catholic	Plainfield, IL
G	24	Hannah Huffman	5 ft 9 in (1.75 m)	So	Carondelet	Diablo, CA
G	32	Jewell Loyd	5 ft 10 in (1.78 m)	So	Niles West	Lincolnwood, IL
G	23	Michaela Mabrey	5 ft 10 in (1.78 m)	So	Manasquan	Belmar, NJ
G	21	Kayla McBride	5 ft 11 in (1.8 m)	Sr	Villa Maria Academy	Erie, PA
F	5	Kristina Nelson	6 ft 3 in (1.91 m)	Fr	Buford	Buford, GA
F	12	Taya Reimer	6 ft 3 in (1.91 m)	Fr	Hamilton Southeastern	Fishers, IN
C	35	Diamond Thompson	6 ft 4 in (1.93 m)	Fr	Wheaton Warrenville South	Wheaton, IL
F	34	Markisha Wright	6 ft 2 in (1.88 m)	Jr	Des Moines East	Des Moines, IA

Head coach

Muffet McGraw

Assistant coach(es)

Carol Owens
Beth Cunningham
Niele Ivey

Legend

- (C) Team captain
- (S) Suspended
- (I) Ineligible
- (W) Walk-on
- Injured
- Current redshirt

Roster
Last update: 2013-10-17

== Schedule ==
Date time, TV	Rank^{#}	Opponent^{#}	Result	Record	Site (attendance) city, state
Exhibition
10/30/2013*; 1:00 pm	No. 6	California (PA)	W 118–49	–	Edmund P. Joyce Center (7,743); South Bend, IN
Regular Season
11/09/2013*; 1:00 pm	No. 6	UNC Wilmington	W 99–50	1–0	Edmund P. Joyce Center (8,572); South Bend, IN
11/11/2013*; 7:00 pm	No. 6	No. 19 Michigan State	W 81–62	2–0	Edmund P. Joyce Center (8,242); South Bend, IN
11/16/2013*; 2:00 pm	No. 6	Valparaiso	W 96–46	3–0	Edmund P. Joyce Center (8,508); South Bend, IN
11/23/2013*; 3:00 pm	No. 5	at Penn	W 76–54	4–0	Palestra (1,025); Philadelphia, PA
11/26/2013*; 7:00 pm	No. 5	No. 25 DePaul	W 92–76	5–0	Edmund P. Joyce Center (8,518); South Bend, IN
12/01/2013*; 2:00 pm	No. 5	vs. Duquesne	W 100–61	6–0	Mattamy Athletic Centre (933); Toronto, ON
12/04/2013*; 7:30 pm, BTN	No. 4	at No. 10 Penn State; ACC – Big Ten Women's Challenge	W 77–67	7–0	Bryce Jordan Center (5,805); University Park, PA
12/07/2013*; Noon	No. 4	UCLA	W 90–48	8–0	Edmund P. Joyce Center (8,501); South Bend, IN
12/14/2013*; 7:00 pm	No. 4	at Michigan	W 86–64	9–0	Crisler Center (3,330); Ann Arbor, MI
12/22/2013*; 2:00 pm	No. 4	Central Michigan	W 106–72	10–0	Edmund P. Joyce Center (8,775); South Bend, IN
12/29/2013*; 5:00 pm, P12N	No. 2	at Oregon State	W 70–58	11–0	Gill Coliseum (4,032); Corvallis, OR
01/02/2014*; 7:00 pm	No. 2	South Dakota State	W 94–51	12–0	Edmund P. Joyce Center (8,867); South Bend, IN
01/05/2014; 2:00 pm	No. 2	Clemson	W 71–51	13–0 (1–0)	Edmund P. Joyce Center (8,599); South Bend, IN
01/09/2014; 7:00 pm	No. 2	Boston College	W 95–53	14–0 (2–0)	Edmund P. Joyce Center (8,474); South Bend, IN
01/12/2014; 2:00 pm	No. 2	at Virginia	W 79–72	15–0 (3–0)	John Paul Jones Arena (4,451); Charlottesville, VA
01/16/2014; 7:00 pm	No. 2	at Pittsburgh	W 109–66	16–0 (4–0)	Petersen Events Center (2,768); Pittsburgh, PA
01/16/2014*; 7:00 pm, ESPN2	No. 2	at No. 12 Tennessee	W 86–70	17–0	Thompson–Boling Arena (13,346); Knoxville, TN
01/23/2014; 7:00 pm, ACCN/RSN	No. 2	Miami (FL)	W 79–52	18–0 (5–0)	Edmund P. Joyce Center (8,304); South Bend, IN
01/27/2014; 7:00 pm, ESPN2	No. 2	at No. 8 Maryland	W 87–83	19–0 (6–0)	Comcast Center (7,668); College Park, MD
01/30/2014; 7:00 pm, ESPN3	No. 2	Virginia Tech	W 74–48	20–0 (7–0)	Edmund P. Joyce Center (8,556); South Bend, IN
02/02/2014; 2:00 pm, ESPN	No. 2	at No. 3 Duke	W 88–67	21–0 (8–0)	Cameron Indoor Stadium (7,018); Durham, NC
02/06/2014; 7:00 pm	No. 2	at Florida State	W 81–60	22–0 (9–0)	Donald L. Tucker Center (2,331); Tallahassee, FL
02/09/2014; 3:00 pm, ACCN/RSN	No. 2	Syracuse	W 101–64	23–0 (10–0)	Edmund P. Joyce Center (9,149); South Bend, IN
02/13/2014; 7:00 pm	No. 2	at Boston College	W 82–61	24–0 (11–0)	Conte Forum (804); Chestnut Hill, MA
02/17/2014; 7:00 pm, ACCN/RSN	No. 2	Georgia Tech	W 87–72	25–0 (12–0)	Edmund P. Joyce Center (8,808); South Bend, IN
02/20/2014; 7:00 pm, ACCN/RSN	No. 2	at Wake Forest	W 86–61	26–0 (13–0)	LJVM Coliseum (1,435); Winston-Salem, NC
02/23/2014; 1:00 pm, ESPN	No. 2	No. 7 Duke	W 81–70	27–0 (14–0)	Edmund P. Joyce Center (9,149); South Bend, IN
02/27/2014; 7:00 pm	No. 2	No. 14 North Carolina	W 100–75	28–0 (15–0)	Edmund P. Joyce Center (9,149); South Bend, IN
03/02/2014; 2:00 pm	No. 2	at No. 13 NC State	W 84–60	29–0 (16–0)	Reynolds Coliseum (3,516); Raleigh, NC
2014 ACC women's basketball tournament
03/07/2014; 2:45 pm, ACCN	No. 2	vs. Florida State; Quarterfinals	W 83–57	30–0 (16–0)	Greensboro Coliseum (4,506); Greensboro, NC
03/08/2014; 5:00 pm, ESPNU	No. 2	vs. No. 14 NC State; Semifinals	W 83–48	31–0 (16–0)	Greensboro Coliseum (N/A); Greensboro, NC
03/09/2014; 7:00 pm, ESPN	No. 2	vs. No. 10 Duke; Championship Game	W 69–53	32–0 (16–0)	Greensboro Coliseum (8,190); Greensboro, NC
2014 NCAA Division I women's basketball tournament
03/22/2014*; 1:30 pm, ESPN	No. 2	vs. Robert Morris; First Round	W 93–42	33–0	Savage Arena (4,312); Toledo, OH
03/24/2014*; 6:30 pm, ESPN	No. 2	vs. Arizona State; Second Round	W 84–67	34–0	Savage Arena (3,544); Toledo, OH
03/29/2014*; 2:30 pm, ESPN	No. 2	No. 21 Oklahoma State; Sweet Sixteen	W 89–72	35–0	Edmund P. Joyce Center (8,774); South Bend, IN
03/31/2014*; 4:30 pm, ESPN	No. 2	No. 5 Baylor; Elite Eight	W 88–69	36–0	Edmund P. Joyce Center (8,774); South Bend, IN
04/06/2014; 6:30 pm, ESPN	No. 2	vs. No. 11 Maryland; Final Four	W 87–61	37–0	Bridgestone Arena (17,548); Nashville, TN
04/08/2014*; 20:30, ESPN	No. 2	vs. No. 1 Connecticut; Championship Game	L 58–79	37–1	Bridgestone Arena (17,570); Nashville, TN
*Non-conference game. ^{#}Rankings from AP Poll. (#) Tournament seedings in parentheses. All times are in Eastern Time.

== Rankings ==
Ranking movement Legend: ██ Increase in ranking. ██ Decrease in ranking. NR = Not ranked. RV = Received votes.
Poll	Pre Nov. 4	Wk 2 Nov. 11	Wk 3 Nov. 18	Wk 4 Nov. 25	Wk 5 Dec. 2	Wk 6 Dec. 9	Wk 7 Dec. 16	Wk 8 Dec. 23	Wk 9 Dec. 30	Wk 10 Jan. 6	Wk 11 Jan. 13	Wk 12 Jan. 20	Wk 13 Jan. 27	Wk 14 Feb. 3	Wk 15 Feb. 10	Wk 16 Feb. 17	Wk 17 Feb. 24	Wk 18 Mar. 3	Wk 19 Mar. 10	Final
AP	6	6	5	5	4	4	4	2	2	2	2	2	2	2	2	2	2	2	2	N/A
Coaches	7	6	6	6	5	4T	4	2	2	2	2	2	2	2	2	2	2	2	2	2

== See also ==
2013–14 Notre Dame Fighting Irish men's basketball team
