= 2013–14 Duke Blue Devils women's basketball team =

Intercollegiate basketball season

2013–14 Duke Blue Devils women's basketball

Paradise Jam tournament Island champion

NCAA Women's tournament, second round
- Conference: Atlantic Coast Conference

Ranking
- Coaches: No. 10
- AP: No. 9
- Record: 27–6 (12–4 ACC)
- Head coach: Joanne P. McCallie
- Assistant coaches: Al Brown; Candice M. Jackson; Hernando Planells
- Home arena: Cameron Indoor Stadium

2013–14 ACC women's basketball standings
| | Conf. | | | | Overall |
| Team | W | | L | PCT | W | | L | PCT |
|---|---|---|---|---|---|---|---|---|
| No. 2 Notre Dame † | 16 | – | 0 | 1.000 | 37 | – | 1 | .974 |
| No. 9 Duke | 12 | – | 4 | .750 | 28 | – | 7 | .800 |
| No. 11 Maryland | 12 | – | 4 | .750 | 28 | – | 7 | .800 |
| No. 16 NC State | 11 | – | 5 | .688 | 25 | – | 8 | .758 |
| Syracuse | 10 | – | 6 | .625 | 23 | – | 10 | .697 |
| No. 12 North Carolina | 10 | – | 6 | .625 | 27 | – | 10 | .730 |
| Georgia Tech | 9 | – | 7 | .563 | 20 | – | 12 | .625 |
| Miami (FL) | 8 | – | 8 | .500 | 16 | – | 15 | .516 |
| Florida State | 7 | – | 9 | .438 | 21 | – | 12 | .636 |
| Virginia | 6 | – | 10 | .375 | 14 | – | 17 | .452 |
| Wake Forest | 5 | – | 11 | .313 | 15 | – | 16 | .484 |
| Virginia Tech | 4 | – | 12 | .250 | 14 | – | 16 | .467 |
| Clemson | 4 | – | 12 | .250 | 13 | – | 19 | .406 |
| Pittsburgh | 3 | – | 13 | .188 | 11 | – | 20 | .355 |
| Boston College | 3 | – | 13 | .188 | 12 | – | 19 | .387 |
† 2014 ACC tournament winner As of 8 April 2014; Rankings from AP poll

The 2013–14 Duke Blue Devils women's basketball team represented Duke University during the 2013–14 NCAA Division I women's basketball season. Returning as head coach is Joanne P. McCallie entering her 7th season. The team plays its home games at Cameron Indoor Stadium in Durham, North Carolina as members of the Atlantic Coast Conference.

== Previous season ==
Duke came off a 33–3 overall and 17–1 league mark the previous season, as the Blue Devils advanced to the NCAA Elite Eight for the fourth straight year and won the ACC Championship.

== Off season ==
=== Departures ===
- Allison Vernerey, a senior with the 2012–13 team, graduated.
- Sierra Moore, a freshman with the 2012–13 team, decided to transfer to Penn State.

=== Incoming signees ===
- Kianna Holland is an incoming freshman from Seneca, South Carolina
- Kendall McCravey-Cooper is an incoming freshman from Carson, California
- Oderah Chidom is an incoming freshman from Oakland, California
- Rebecca Greenwell is an incoming freshman from Owensboro, Kentucky

=== USA Basketball ===
During the summer, Duke senior guard Tricia Liston won a gold medal with the USA Women's World University Games Team in Russia.

Liston made a key impact on the team in leading them to a 6–0 record, averaging 8.2 points, 3.0 rebounds and 1.0 assists per game. She posted a tied for team best nine three-pointers made, which also tied for fourth most in the tournament. Liston also hit a team-high 42.9 percent from downtown and registered double-figure scoring in each of her first four games.

Sophomore Alexis Jones also won a gold medal with USA Basketball at the 2013 USA U19 World Championships. Team USA (9–0) held France (7–2) to eight points in the second half en route to a 61–28 victory and the USA's fifth-straight FIBA U19 World Championship gold medal. The Championships were held in Klaipėda and Panevėžys, Lithuania.

In the nine games, Jones averaged 10.0 points, 4.3 assists, 3.2 rebounds and 1.7 steals, while collecting her third career gold medal with USA Basketball. Jones started each of the nine contests and her 4.3 assists per game average ranked tied for fourth among all teams.

In the USA U19 record book, Jones dished out 29 assists and is tied with Ariel Massengale (2011) for the top spot in that category. She is also No. 2 in free throw percentage (.933).

== Season preview ==
Duke is coming off posting a 33–3 overall and 17–1 league mark last season, as the Blue Devils advanced to the NCAA Elite Eight for the fourth straight year and won the ACC Championship.

Head coach Joanne P. McCallie and the Blue Devils return all five starters in 2013–14, including 93.7 percent of its scoring. Along with returning All-America selections Chelsea Gray and Elizabeth Williams, Duke welcomes back All-ACC performers Tricia Liston and Haley Peters. Freshman All-America and ACC Tournament MVP Alexis Jones is the final returning starter for Duke. A total of 11 letterwinners will return to the squad next season as McCallie enters her seventh season with the Blue Devils.

Duke will get started with its annual Blue/White scrimmage on Sunday, Oct. 27 followed by exhibition contests against Glenville State College (Oct. 30) and Coker College (Nov. 3). The Blue Devils will open the season on Sunday, Nov. 10 on the road against a ranked opponent, California.

== Roster ==
2013–14 Duke Blue Devils women's basketball team
Players
Coaches

| Pos. | # | Name | Height | Year | Previous school | Hometown |
|---|---|---|---|---|---|---|
| F/C | 1 | Elizabeth Williams | 6 ft 3 in (1.91 m) | Jr | Princess Anne | Virginia Beach, Va. |
| G | 2 | Alexis Jones | 5 ft 8 in (1.73 m) | So | MacArthur | Irving, Texas |
| G | 3 | Kianna Holland | 5 ft 9 in (1.75 m) | Fr | Seneca | Seneca, S.C. |
| G | 4 | Chloe Wells | 5 ft 7 in (1.7 m) | Sr | A.B. Miller/Apex | Colton, Calif. |
| C | 5 | Katie Heckman | 6 ft 4 in (1.93 m) | RS Fr | Regis Jesuit | Centennial, Colo. |
| G | 12 | Chelsea Gray | 5 ft 11 in (1.8 m) | Sr | St. Mary's | Manteca, Calif. |
| G/F | 14 | Ka'lia Johnson | 5 ft 10 in (1.78 m) | Jr | Thomas Dale | Chester, Va. |
| G/F | 15 | Richa Jackson | 6 ft 0 in (1.83 m) | Sr | Midwest City | Midwest City, Okla. |
| F/C | 21 | Kendall McCravey-Cooper | 6 ft 4 in (1.93 m) | Fr | St. Anthony | Carson, Calif. |
| F | 22 | Oderah Chidom | 6 ft 4 in (1.93 m) | Fr | Bishop O'Dowd | Oakland, Calif. |
| G | 23 | Rebecca Greenwell | 6 ft 1 in (1.85 m) | Fr | Owensboro Catholic | Owensboro, Ky. |
| F/C | 30 | Amber Henson | 6 ft 4 in (1.93 m) | RS Fr | Walter L. Sickles | Tampa, Fla. |
| G | 32 | Tricia Liston | 6 ft 1 in (1.85 m) | Sr | Fenwick | River Forest, Ill. |
| G/F | 33 | Haley Peters | 6 ft 3 in (1.91 m) | Sr | The Peddie School | Red Bank, N.J. |
| G | 35 | Jenna Frush (W) | 5 ft 6 in (1.68 m) | Jr | Northern | Durham, N.C. |

Head coach

Joanne P. McCallie

Assistant coach(es)

Al Brown
Candice M. Jackson
Hernando Planells

Legend

- (C) Team captain
- (S) Suspended
- (I) Ineligible
- (W) Walk-on
- Injured
- Current redshirt

Roster
Last update: 2014-02-18

== Schedule ==
| Date time, TV | Rank^{#} | Opponent^{#} | Result | Record | High points | High rebounds | High assists | Site (attendance) city, state |
Exhibition
| 10/30/2013*; 6:30 pm | No. 2 | Glenville State College | W 122–77 | – | 20 – Jones | 15 – Williams | 14 – Gray | Cameron Indoor Stadium (N/A); Durham, NC |
| 11/03/2013*; 2:00 pm | No. 2 | Coker College | W 102–50 | – | 29 – Williams | 10 – Williams | 12 – Gray | Cameron Indoor Stadium (N/A); Durham, NC |
Non-conference regular season
| 11/10/2013*; 6:00 pm, ESPNU | No. 2 | at No. 9 California | W 70–58 | 1–0 | 22 – Gray (1) | 11 – Williams (1) | 5 – 2 tied | Haas Pavilion (10,771); Berkeley, CA |
| 11/14/2013*; 6:30 pm | No. 2 | USC Upstate | W 123–40 | 2–0 | 20 – Liston (1) | 20 – Peters (1) | 8 – Gray (2) | Cameron Indoor Stadium (4,013); Durham, NC |
| 11/17/2013*; 2:00 pm | No. 2 | Alabama | W 92–57 | 3–0 | 20 – Liston (2) | 12 – Peters (2) | 9 – Gray (3) | Cameron Indoor Stadium (4,009); Durham, NC |
| 11/21/2013*; 6:30 pm | No. 2 | Vanderbilt | W 88–69 | 4–0 | 18 – Liston (3) | 8 – Gray (1) | 12 – Gray (4) | Cameron Indoor Stadium (3,938); Durham, NC |
| 11/24/2013*; 4:00 pm, FS1 | No. 2 | at Marquette | W 78–61 | 5–0 | 23 – Williams (1) | 9 – Gray (2) | 13 – Gray (5) | Al McGuire Center (2,451); Milwaukee, WI |
| 11/28/2013*; 1:15 pm | No. 2 | vs. Xavier; Paradise Jam tournament | W 81–54 | 6–0 | 22 – Liston (4) | 9 – Gray (3) | 9 – Gray (6) | Sports and Fitness Center (N/A); Saint Thomas, USVI |
| 11/29/2013*; 1:15 pm | No. 2 | vs. Central Michigan; Paradise Jam Tournament | W 97–64 | 7–0 | 20 – Liston (5) | 11 – Liston (1) | 9 – Gray (7) | Sports and Fitness Center (N/A); Saint Thomas, USVI |
| 11/30/2013*; 3:30 pm | No. 2 | vs. Kansas; Paradise Jam Tournament | W 73–40 | 8–0 | 19 – Liston (6) | 14 – Chidom (1) | 5 – Gray (8) | Sports and Fitness Center (N/A); Saint Thomas, USVI |
| 12/05/2013*; 6:30 pm | No. 2 | No. 16 Purdue; ACC–Big Ten Women's Challenge | W 99–78 | 9–0 | 22 – Jones (1) | 9 – Peters (3) | 9 – Gray (9) | Cameron Indoor Stadium (3,758); Durham, NC |
| 12/08/2013*; 4:00 pm, FS1 | No. 2 | at No. 17 Oklahoma | W 94–85 | 10–0 | 23 – Liston (7) | 7 – Jones (1) | 6 – Jones (2) | Lloyd Noble Center (6,878); Norman, OK |
| 12/17/2013*; 7:00 pm, ESPN2 | No. 2 | No. 1 Connecticut; Jimmy V Classic | L 61–83 | 10–1 | 13 – Gray (2) | 8 – Peters (4) | 4 – Jones (3) | Cameron Indoor Stadium (9,314); Durham, NC |
| 12/19/2013*; 6:30 pm | No. 2 | Albany | W 80–51 | 11–1 | 17 – Peters (1) | 5 – Johnson (1) | 9 – Gray (10) | Cameron Indoor Stadium (3,604); Durham, NC |
| 12/22/2013*; 3:00 pm, FSSO | No. 2 | at No. 5 Kentucky | W 67–61 | 12–1 | 28 – Liston (8) | 9 – Jones (2) | 6 – Gray (11) | Rupp Arena (23,706); Lexington, KY |
| 01/02/2014*; 6:30 pm | No. 3 | Old Dominion | W 87–63 | 13–1 | 17 – Liston (9) | 12 – Williams (2) | 5 – Peters (1) | Cameron Indoor Stadium (4,450); Durham, NC |
ACC Regular Season
| 01/05/2014; 2:00 pm, ESPN3 | No. 3 | at Georgia Tech | W 64–47 | 14–1 (1–0) | 18 – Williams (2) | 15 – Peters (5) | 9 – Gray (12) | Hank McCamish Pavilion (2,150); Atlanta, GA |
| 01/09/2014; 7:00 pm, TWCS | No. 3 | at Syracuse | W 86–53 | 15–1 (2–0) | 20 – Liston (10) | 11 – Williams (3) | 7 – 2 tied | Carrier Dome (1,107); Syracuse, NY |
| 01/12/2014; 3:00 pm, RSN | No. 3 | Boston College | W 78–57 | 16–1 (3–0) | 17 – Jackson (1) | 11 – Williams (4) | 3 – Jackson (1) | Cameron Indoor Stadium (4,410); Durham, NC |
| 01/16/2014; 6:30 pm, RSN | No. 3 | Virginia | W 90–55 | 17–1 (4–0) | 21 – Liston (11) | 12 – Liston (2) | 6 – Jones (5) | Cameron Indoor Stadium (4,057); Durham, NC |
| 01/19/2014; 12:00 pm, RSN | No. 3 | at Virginia Tech | W 74–70 | 18–1 (5–0) | 22 – Liston (12) | 8 – Peters (6) | 6 – Jones (6) | Cassell Coliseum (1,760); Blacksburg, VA |
| 01/23/2014; 7:00 pm, ESPN3 | No. 3 | at No. 24 Florida State | W 85–77 ^{OT} | 19–1 (6–0) | 25 – Liston (13) | 10 – Jackson (1) | 15 – Jones (7) | Donald L. Tucker Center (2,158); Tallahassee, FL |
| 01/26/2014; 2:00 pm, ESPN3 | No. 3 | Pittsburgh | W 111–67 | 20–1 (7–0) | 23 – Liston (14) | 12 – Peters (7) | 7 – Jones (8) | Cameron Indoor Stadium (4,504); Durham, NC |
| 01/30/2014; 7:00 pm | No. 3 | at Miami (FL) | W 76–75 | 21–1 (8–0) | 29 – Liston (15) | 12 – 2 tied | 6 – Jones (9) | BankUnited Center (1,293); Coral Gables, FL |
| 02/02/2014; 2:00 pm, ESPN | No. 3 | No. 2 Notre Dame | L 67–88 | 21–2 (8–1) | 23 – Liston (16) | 7 – Williams (6) | 5 – Jones (10) | Cameron Indoor Stadium (7,018); Durham, NC |
| 02/06/2014; 7:00 pm, CSS | No. 5 | at Clemson | W 78–51 | 22–2 (9–1) | 17 – Peters (2) | 10 – Liston (3) | 4 – 2 tied | Littlejohn Coliseum (921); Clemson, SC |
| 02/10/2014; 7:00 pm, ESPN2 | No. 3 | No. 17 North Carolina | L 78–89 | 22–3 (9–2) | 28 – Williams (3) | 7 – 3 tied | 11 – Jones (11) | Cameron Indoor Stadium (8,210); Durham, NC |
| 02/17/2014; 7:00 pm, ESPN2 | No. 7 | No. 8 Maryland | W 84-63 | 23-3 (10-2) | 22 – Jones (2) | 11 – Williams (8) | 4 – Jones (12) | Cameron Indoor Stadium (5,604); Durham, NC |
| 02/20/2014; 6:30 pm, ESPN3 | No. 7 | No. 14 NC State | W 83-70 | 24–3 (11–2) | 24 – Liston (17) | 10 – 2 tied | 7 – Jones (13) | Cameron Indoor Stadium (4,709); Durham, NC |
| 02/23/2014; 1:00 pm, ESPN | No. 7 | at Notre Dame | L 70-81 | 24–4 (11–3) | 20 – Williams (4) | 6 – 2 tied | 6 – Jones (14) | Edmund P. Joyce Center (9,149); South Bend, IN |
| 02/27/2014; 6:30 pm, ESPN3 | No. 7 | Wake Forest | W 71-56 | 25–4 (12–3) | 22 – Peters (3) | 12 – Chidom (3) | 3 – 3 tied | Cameron Indoor Stadium (4,444); Durham, NC |
| 03/02/2014; 1:00 pm, ESPN | No. 7 | at No. 11 North Carolina | L 60-64 | 25–5 (12–4) | 19 – Liston (18) | 9 – 2 tied | 4 – Peters (2) | Carmichael Arena (5,376); Chapel Hill, NC |
ACC Tournament
| 03/07/2014; 6:00 pm, RSN/ESPN3 | No. 10 | vs. Georgia Tech; Quarterfinals | W 82-52 | 26–5 | 19 – Peters (4) | 13 – Chidom (4) | 5 – Williams (2) | Greensboro Coliseum (N/A); Greensboro, NC |
| 03/08/2014; 7:30 pm, ESPNU | No. 10 | vs. No. 13 North Carolina; Semifinals | W 66-61 | 27–5 | 17 – Liston (19) | 9 – Williams (11) | 4 – Johnson (1) | Greensboro Coliseum (8,169); Greensboro, NC |
| 03/09/2014; 7:00 pm, ESPN | No. 10 | vs. No. 2 Notre Dame; Finals | L 53-69 | 27–6 | 18 – Peters (5) | 16 – Williams (12) | 3 – Johnson (2) | Greensboro Coliseum (8,190); Greensboro, NC |
NCAA tournament
| 03/22/2014; 11:00 am, ESPN2 | No. 9 (L 2) | Winthrop; First round | W 87-45 | 28–6 | 20 – Liston (20) | 10 – McCravey-Cooper (1) | 6 – Peters (3) | Cameron Indoor Stadium (3,013); Durham, NC |
| 03/24/2014; 6:30 pm, ESPN2 | No. 9 (L 2) | No. 23 DePaul; Second round | L 65-74 | 28–7 | 12 – Williams (5) | 10 – Williams (13) | 2 – 4 tied | Cameron Indoor Stadium (2,787); Durham, NC |
*Non-conference game. ^{#}Rankings from AP Poll, (#) during NCAA Tournament is seed within region, L=Lincoln Regional. (#) Tournament seedings in parentheses. All times are in Eastern Time.

== Rankings ==
Ranking movement Legend: ██ Increase in ranking. ██ Decrease in ranking. NR = Not ranked. RV = Received votes.
| Poll | Pre Nov. 4 | Wk 2 Nov. 11 | Wk 3 Nov. 18 | Wk 4 Nov. 25 | Wk 5 Dec. 2 | Wk 6 Dec. 9 | Wk 7 Dec. 16 | Wk 8 Dec. 23 | Wk 9 Dec. 30 | Wk 10 Jan. 6 | Wk 11 Jan. 13 | Wk 12 Jan. 20 | Wk 13 Jan. 27 | Wk 14 Feb. 3 | Wk 15 Feb. 10 | Wk 16 Feb. 17 | Wk 17 Feb. 24 | Wk 18 Mar. 3 | Wk 19 Mar. 10 | Final |
|---|---|---|---|---|---|---|---|---|---|---|---|---|---|---|---|---|---|---|---|---|
| AP | 2 | 2 | 2 | 2 | 2 | 2 | 2 | 3 | 3 | 3 | 3 | 3 | 3 | 5 | 3 | 7 | 7 | 10 | 9 | |
| Coaches | 2 | 2 | 2 | 2 | 2 | 2 | 2 | 3 | 3 | 3 | 3 | 3 | 3 | 5 | 7 | 7 | 8 | 10 | 10 | |
