= 2013–14 Maryland Terrapins women's basketball team =

Intercollegiate basketball season

2013–14 Maryland Terrapins women's basketball
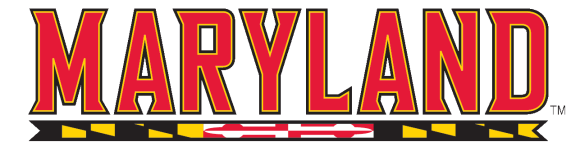

NCAA tournament, Final Four
- Conference: Atlantic Coast Conference

Ranking
- Coaches: No. 4
- AP: No. 11
- Record: 28–7 (12–4 ACC)
- Head coach: Brenda Frese (12th season)
- Assistant coaches: Tina Langley; David Adkins; Marlin Chinn
- Home arena: Xfinity Center

2013–14 ACC women's basketball standings
	Conf.				Overall
Team	W		L	PCT	W		L	PCT
No. 2 Notre Dame †	16	–	0	1.000	37	–	1	.974
No. 9 Duke	12	–	4	.750	28	–	7	.800
No. 11 Maryland	12	–	4	.750	28	–	7	.800
No. 16 NC State	11	–	5	.688	25	–	8	.758
Syracuse	10	–	6	.625	23	–	10	.697
No. 12 North Carolina	10	–	6	.625	27	–	10	.730
Georgia Tech	9	–	7	.563	20	–	12	.625
Miami (FL)	8	–	8	.500	16	–	15	.516
Florida State	7	–	9	.438	21	–	12	.636
Virginia	6	–	10	.375	14	–	17	.452
Wake Forest	5	–	11	.313	15	–	16	.484
Virginia Tech	4	–	12	.250	14	–	16	.467
Clemson	4	–	12	.250	13	–	19	.406
Pittsburgh	3	–	13	.188	11	–	20	.355
Boston College	3	–	13	.188	12	–	19	.387
† 2014 ACC tournament winner As of 8 April 2014; Rankings from AP poll

The 2013–14 Maryland Terrapins women's basketball team represented the University of Maryland, College Park during the 2013–14 NCAA Division I women's basketball season. They were led by twelfth-year head coach Brenda Frese and played their home games at the Xfinity Center. They were members of the Atlantic Coast Conference for the 38th seasons before moving to the Big Ten Conference. The Lady Terrapins finished second in the regular season standings and the 2014 ACC women's basketball tournament in their last year as a member. They received an automatic bid to the NCAA women's basketball tournament, where they advanced to the Final Four, losing to the national champions Connecticut.

== Roster ==
2013–14 Maryland Terrapins women's basketball team
Players
Coaches

Pos.	#	Name	Height	Year	Previous school	Hometown
G	0	Sequoia Austin	5 ft 5 in (1.65 m)	Sr	Holton-Arms School	Greenbelt, MD
G	1	Laurin Mincy	6 ft 0 in (1.83 m)	RS Jr	University	Newark, NJ
G	3	Brene Moseley	5 ft 7 in (1.7 m)	RS So	Paint Branch	Burtonsville, MD
G	4	Lexie Brown	5 ft 9 in (1.75 m)	Fr	North Gwinnett	Suwanee, GA
C	5	Malina Howard	6 ft 4 in (1.93 m)	So	Twinsburg	Twinsburg, OH
C	13	Alicia DeVaughn	6 ft 4 in (1.93 m)	Sr	Blanche Ely	West Palm Beach, FL
G	15	Chloe Pavlech	5 ft 9 in (1.75 m)	So	Sycamore	Cincinnati, OH
C	21	Essence Townsend	6 ft 7 in (2.01 m)	RS Sr	Paterson Catholic	Paterson, NJ
F	22	Tierney Pfirman	6 ft 2 in (1.88 m)	So	South Williamsport Junior Senior	Williamsport, PA
F	25	Alyssa Thomas	6 ft 2 in (1.88 m)	Sr	Central Dauphin	Harrisburg, PA
F	32	Shatori Walker-Kimbrough	5 ft 11 in (1.8 m)	Fr	Hopewell	Aliquippa, PA
F	33	A'Lexus Harrison	6 ft 0 in (1.83 m)	Fr	Digital Harbor	Baltimore, MD
G	40	Katie Rutan	5 ft 9 in (1.75 m)	RS Sr	Springside	Ambler, PA
C	42	Brionna Jones	6 ft 3 in (1.91 m)	Fr	Aberdeen	Havre de Grace, MD

Head coach

Brenda Frese

Assistant coach(es)

- Tina Langley
- David Adkins
- Marlin Chinn

Legend

- (C) Team captain
- (S) Suspended
- (I) Ineligible
- (W) Walk-on
- Injured
- Current redshirt

Roster
Last update: 2014-09-14

== Schedule ==
Date time, TV	Rank^{#}	Opponent^{#}	Result	Record	Site (attendance) city, state
Non-conference regular season
Nov 8, 2013*; 7:00 pm		at South Florida	W 78–70	1–0	Yuengling Center; Tampa, FL
Nov 10, 2013*; 2:00 pm		Loyola (MD)	W 89–53	2–0	Comcast Center; College Park, MD
Nov 15, 2013*; 6:00 pm, ESPNU	No. 8	No. 1 UConn	L 55–72	2–1	Comcast Center (15,327); College Park, MD
Nov 19, 2013*; 7:00 pm		George Washington	W 87–51	3–1	Comcast Center; College Park, MD
Nov 23, 2013*; 8:00 pm		at Towson	W 90–53	4–1	SECU Arena; Towson, MD
Nov 25, 2013*; 7:00 pm		Drexel	W 69–63	5–1	Comcast Center; College Park, MD
Nov 29, 2013*; 3:30 pm	No. 8	vs. Texas Southern; San Juan Shootout	W 100–59	6–1	Mario Morales Coliseu; Guaynabo, Puerto Rico
Nov 30, 2013*; 1:00 pm	No. 8	vs. Ohio; San Juan Shootout	W 84–60	7–1	Mario Morales Coliseu; Guaynabo, Puerto Rico
Dec 4, 2013*; 7:00 pm	No. 8	Ohio State; ACC – Big Ten Women's Challenge	W 67–55	8–1	Comcast Center (3,737); College Park, MD
Dec 9, 2013*; 7:00 pm		Siena	W 105–49	9–1	Comcast Center; College Park, MD
Dec 14, 2013*; 7:00 pm		Delaware State	W 93–44	10–1	Comcast Center; College Park, MD
Dec 28, 2013*; 12:00 pm		Wofford; Terrapin Classic	W 110–53	11–1	Comcast Center; College Park, MD
Dec 29, 2013*; 1:30 pm		Charleston; Terrapin Classic	W 103–51	12–1	Comcast Center; College Park, MD
ACC regular season
Jan 5, 2014; 3:00 pm, ESPNU	No. 8	at No. 10 North Carolina	W 79–70	13–1 (1–0)	Carmichael Arena (4,830); Chapel Hill, NC
Jan 9, 2014; 7:00 pm		Wake Forest	W 76–49	14–1 (2–0)	Comcast Center; College Park, MD
Jan 16, 2014; 8:30 pm		Syracuse	W 77–62	15–1 (3–0)	Comcast Center; College Park, MD
Jan 19, 2014; 2:00 pm		Georgia Tech	W 92–81	16–1 (4–0)	Comcast Center; College Park, MD
Jan 23, 2014; 6:30 pm		at Virginia	L 72–86	16–2 (4–1)	John Paul Jones Arena; Charlottesville, VA
Jan 27, 2014; 7:00 pm, ESPN2	No. 8	No. 2 Notre Dame	L 83–87	16–3 (4–2)	Comcast Center (7,668); College Park, MD
Jan 30, 2014; 7:00 pm		at NC State	L 63–72	16–4 (4–3)	Reynolds Center; Raleigh, NC
Feb 2, 2014; 12:00 pm		at Syracuse	W 89–64	17–4 (5–3)	Carrier Dome; Syracuse, NY
Feb 6, 2014; 7:00 pm	No. 10	Pittsburgh	W 94–46	18–4 (6–3)	Comcast Center (3,758); College Park, MD
Feb 9, 2014; 2:00 pm	No. 9	Clemson	W 95–43	19–4 (7–3)	Comcast Center; College Park, MD
Feb 13, 2014; 7:00 pm		at Miami (FL)	W 67–52	20–4 (8–3)	BankUnited Center; Coral Gables, FL
Feb 17, 2014; 7:00 pm, ESPN2	No. 8	at No. 7 Duke	L 63–84	20–5 (8–4)	Cameron Indoor Stadium (5,604); Durham, NC
Feb 20, 2014; 8:30 pm		Florida State	W 87–77	21–5 (9–4)	Comcast Center; College Park, MD
Feb 23, 2014; 4:00 pm		at Georgia Tech	W 79–62	22–5 (10–4)	McCamish Pavilion; Atlanta, Georgia
Feb 27, 2014; 7:00 pm		at Boston College	W 92–66	23–5 (11–4)	Conte Forum (925); Chestnut Hill, MA
Mar 2, 2014; 2:00 pm		Virginia Tech	W 87–48	24–5 (12–4)	Comcast Center; College Park, MD
ACC tournament
Mar 7, 2014; 8:00 pm, ACCN	No. 8	vs. North Carolina; Quarterfinals	L 70–73	24–6	Greensboro Coliseum (6,949); Greensboro, NC
NCAA tournament
Mar 23, 2014*; 12:30 pm	(LO 4) No. 11	(LO 13) Army; First round	W 90–52	25–6	Comcast Center; College Park, MD
Mar 25, 2014*; 7:00 pm, ESPN2	(LO 4) No. 11	(LO 5) Texas; Second round	W 69–64	26–6	Comcast Center (4,042); College Park, MD
Mar 30, 2014*; 12:00 pm, ESPN	(LO 4) No. 11	vs. (LO 1) No. 4 Tennessee; Regional Semifinal – Sweet Sixteen	W 73–62	27–6	KFC Yum! Center (11,097); Louisville, KY
Apr 1, 2014*; 7:00 pm, ESPN	(LO 4) No. 11	at (LO 3) No. 3 Louisville; Regional Final – Elite Eight	W 76–73	28–6	KFC Yum! Center; Louisville, KY
Apr 6, 2014*; 6:30 pm, ESPN	(LO 4) No. 11	vs. (ND 1) No. 2 Notre Dame; National Semifinal – Final Four	L 61–87	28–7	Bridgestone Arena (17,548); Nashville, TN
*Non-conference game. ^{#}Rankings from AP Poll, ( ) Tournament seedings in parentheses. (#) Tournament seedings in parentheses. LO=Louisville. All times are in Eastern Time.

== See also ==
- 2013–14 Maryland Terrapins men's basketball team
