= 2013–14 North Carolina Tar Heels women's basketball team =

Intercollegiate basketball season

2013–14 North Carolina Tar Heels women's basketball

NCAA Women's Tournament, Elite Eight
- Conference: Atlantic Coast Conference

Ranking
- Coaches: No. 10
- AP: No. 12
- Record: 27–10 (10–6 ACC)
- Head coach: Sylvia Hatchell
- Assistant coaches: Andrew Calder; Ivory Latta; Tracey Williams-Johnson
- Home arena: Carmichael Arena

2013–14 ACC women's basketball standings
	Conf.				Overall
Team	W		L	PCT	W		L	PCT
No. 2 Notre Dame †	16	–	0	1.000	37	–	1	.974
No. 9 Duke	12	–	4	.750	28	–	7	.800
No. 11 Maryland	12	–	4	.750	28	–	7	.800
No. 16 NC State	11	–	5	.688	25	–	8	.758
Syracuse	10	–	6	.625	23	–	10	.697
No. 12 North Carolina	10	–	6	.625	27	–	10	.730
Georgia Tech	9	–	7	.563	20	–	12	.625
Miami (FL)	8	–	8	.500	16	–	15	.516
Florida State	7	–	9	.438	21	–	12	.636
Virginia	6	–	10	.375	14	–	17	.452
Wake Forest	5	–	11	.313	15	–	16	.484
Virginia Tech	4	–	12	.250	14	–	16	.467
Clemson	4	–	12	.250	13	–	19	.406
Pittsburgh	3	–	13	.188	11	–	20	.355
Boston College	3	–	13	.188	12	–	19	.387
† 2014 ACC tournament winner As of 8 April 2014; Rankings from AP poll

The 2013–14 North Carolina Tar Heels women's basketball team represented the University of North Carolina at Chapel Hill during the 2013–14 NCAA Division I women's basketball season. The Tar Heels, led by 28th-year head coach Sylvia Hatchell, played their games at Carmichael Arena and were members of the Atlantic Coast Conference.

In October 2013, Coach Hatchell was diagnosed with acute myeloid leukemia. While she remained involved in the team's daily operations, assistant coach Andrew Calder took over practice and gametime decisions for the season.

== Roster ==
2013–14 North Carolina Tar Heels women's basketball team
Players
Coaches

Pos.	#	Name	Height	Year	Previous school	Hometown
F	1	Stephanie Mavunga	6 ft 3 in (1.91 m)	Fr	Brownsburg	Indianapolis, IN
G	2	Latifah Coleman	5 ft 9 in (1.75 m)	Jr	Central	Pageland, SC
G	3	Megan Buckland	6 ft 0 in (1.83 m)	So	Bishop McGuinness	High Point, NC
G	10	Danielle Butts	5 ft 10 in (1.78 m)	Jr	South Central	Winterville, NC
G	11	Brittany Rountree	5 ft 9 in (1.75 m)	Jr	The Potter's House	Jacksonville, FL
F	13	Hillary Fuller	6 ft 2 in (1.88 m)	RS Fr	The Potter's House	Jacksonville, FL
G	15	Allisha Gray	6 ft 0 in (1.83 m)	Fr	Washington County	Sandersville, GA
G	22	N'Dea Bryant	6 ft 0 in (1.83 m)	So	Goose Creek	Goose Creek, SC
G	23	Diamond DeShields	6 ft 1 in (1.85 m)	Fr	Norcross	Norcross, GA
G	24	Jessica Washington	5 ft 8 in (1.73 m)	Fr	Jenks	Tulsa, OK
F	30	Hillary Summers	6 ft 2 in (1.88 m)	RS Fr	Village Christian Academy	Fayetteville, NC
G	31	Erika Johnson	6 ft 1 in (1.85 m)	Jr	Holy Names Academy	Seattle, WA
F	34	Xylina McDaniel	6 ft 2 in (1.88 m)	So	Spring Valley	Columbia, SC

Head coach

Sylvia Hatchell

Assistant coach(es)

Andrew Calder
Ivory Latta
Tracey Williams-Johnson

Legend

- (C) Team captain
- (S) Suspended
- (I) Ineligible
- (W) Walk-on
- Injured
- Current redshirt

Roster
Last update: 2013-08-15

== Schedule ==
Date time, TV	Rank^{#}	Opponent^{#}	Result	Record	Site (attendance) city, state
Exhibition
10/30/2013*; 6:00 pm	No. 12	Carson-Newman	W 111–50	–	Carmichael Arena (N/A); Chapel Hill, NC
11/05/2013*; 6:00 pm	No. 12	Wingate	W 93–61	–	Carmichael Arena (N/A); Chapel Hill, NC
Non-conference regular season
11/08/2013*; 4:30 pm	No. 12	Air Force	W 87–26	1–0	Carmichael Arena (2,302); Chapel Hill, NC
11/11/2013*; 9:00 pm, ESPN2	No. 12	No. 4 Tennessee	L 65–81	1–1	Carmichael Arena (4,923); Chapel Hill, NC
11/17/2013*; 6:00 pm, P12N	No. 12	at UCLA	W 78–68	2–1	Pauley Pavilion (2,465); Los Angeles, CA
11/21/2013*; 6:00 pm	No. 12	Coastal Carolina	W 106–62	3–1	Carmichael Arena (2,157); Chapel Hill, NC
11/24/2013*; 2:00 pm	No. 12	Coppin State	W 91–51	4–1	Carmichael Arena (1,915); Chapel Hill, NC
11/28/2013*; 3:30 pm	No. 11	vs. Arkansas State; Cancún Challenge	W 93–60	5–1	Moon Palace Golf & Spa Resort (934); Cancún, MX
11/29/2013*; 1:00 pm	No. 11	vs. Arizona State; Cancún Challenge	L 91–94 ^{OT}	5–2	Moon Palace Golf & Spa Resort (502); Cancún, MX
11/30/2013*; 3:30 pm	No. 11	vs. Illinois; Cancún Challenge	W 87–54	6–2	Moon Palace Golf & Spa Resort (934); Cancún, MX
12/04/2013*; 6:00 pm, ESPN3	No. 15	No. 18 Nebraska; ACC – Big Ten Women's Challenge	W 75–62	7–2	Carmichael Arena (1,534); Chapel Hill, NC
12/14/2013*; 1:00 pm	No. 15	Charleston Southern	W 100–49	8–2	Carmichael Arena (1,862); Chapel Hill, NC
12/16/2013*; 6:30 pm	No. 14	vs. New Orleans; Carolinas Challenge	W 124–41	9–2	Myrtle Beach Convention Center (N/A); Myrtle Beach, SC
12/18/2013*; 7:00 pm	No. 14	vs. No. 10 South Carolina; Carolinas Challenge	W 74–66	10–2	Myrtle Beach Convention Center (4,137); Myrtle Beach, SC
12/21/2013*; 7:00 pm	No. 14	High Point	W 100–71	11–2	Carmichael Arena (2,260); Chapel Hill, NC
01/02/2014*; 2:00 pm	No. 10	James Madison	W 74–71	12–2	Carmichael Arena (2,278); Chapel Hill, NC
ACC regular season
01/05/2014; 3:00 pm, ESPNU	No. 10	No. 8 Maryland	L 70–79	12–3 (0–1)	Carmichael Arena (4,830); Chapel Hill, NC
01/09/2014; 6:00 pm, ESPN3	No. 13	No. 20 NC State	W 79–70	13–3 (1–1)	Carmichael Arena (4,035); Chapel Hill, NC
01/09/2014; 1:00 pm, RSN/ESPN3	No. 13	at No. 18 Florida State	W 65–61	14–3 (2–1)	Donald L. Tucker Center (2,505); Tallahassee, FL
01/16/2014; 6:00 pm, ESPN3	No. 9	Clemson	W 78–55	15–3 (3–1)	Carmichael Arena (3,022); Chapel Hill, NC
01/19/2014; 1:00 pm	No. 9	at Boston College	W 73–56	16–3 (4–1)	Conte Forum (1,612); Chestnut Hill, MA
01/23/2014; 7:00 pm	No. 7	at Wake Forest	W 83–65	17–3 (5–1)	LJVM Coliseum (2,137); Winston-Salem, NC
01/30/2014; 7:00 pm, RSN/ESPN3	No. 6	Syracuse	L 73–78	17–4 (5–2)	Carmichael Arena (3,007); Chapel Hill, NC
02/02/2014; 2:00 pm, RSN/ESPN3	No. 6	Miami (FL)	L 80–83	17–5 (5–3)	Carmichael Arena (3,226); Chapel Hill, NC
02/06/2014; 2:00 pm, ESPN3	No. 13	at Georgia Tech	L 91–94	17–6 (5–4)	Hank McCamish Pavilion (1,635); Atlanta, GA
02/10/2014; 7:00 pm, ESPN2	No. 17	at No. 3 Duke	W 89–78	18–6 (6–4)	Cameron Indoor Stadium (8,210); Durham, NC
02/13/2014; 7:00 pm, ESPN3	No. 17	Pittsburgh	W 86–50	19–6 (7–4)	Carmichael Arena (2,813); Chapel Hill, NC
02/16/2014; 3:30 pm, ESPN2	No. 17	at No. 10 NC State	W 89–82	20–6 (8–4)	Reynolds Center (8,114); Raleigh, NC
02/20/2014; 6:30 pm, RSN/ESPN3	No. 11	at Virginia	W 80–74	21–6 (9–4)	John Paul Jones Arena (3,770); Charlottesville, VA
02/23/2014; 2:00 pm, ESPN3	No. 14	Virginia Tech	L 47–50	21–7 (9–5)	Carmichael Arena (3,875); Chapel Hill, NC
02/27/2014; 7:00 pm, ESPN3	No. 11	at No. 2 Notre Dame	L 75–100	21–8 (9–6)	Edmund P. Joyce Center (9,149); South Bend, IN
03/02/2014; 1:00 pm, ESPN	No. 11	No. 7 Duke	W 64–60	22–8 (10–6)	Carmichael Arena (5,376); Chapel Hill, NC
ACC Women's Tournament
03/06/2014; 8:00 pm, RSN	No. 13	vs. Wake Forest; Second Round	W 69–65	23–8	Greensboro Coliseum (5,941); Greensboro, NC
03/07/2014; 8:00 pm	No. 13	vs. No. 8 Maryland; Quarterfinals	W 73–70	24–8	Greensboro Coliseum (6,949); Greensboro, NC
03/08/2014; 8:00 pm, ESPNU	No. 13	vs. No. 10 Duke; Semifinals	L 61–66	24–9	Greensboro Coliseum (8,169); Greensboro, NC
NCAA Women's Tournament
03/23/2014*; 3:00 pm, ESPN2	No. 12	Tennessee–Martin; First Round	W 60–58	25–9	Carmichael Arena (2,467); Chapel Hill, NC
03/25/2014*; 7:00 pm, ESPN2	No. 12	No. 20 Michigan State; Second Round	W 62–53	26–9	Carmichael Arena (2,010); Chapel Hill, NC
03/30/2014*; 7:00 pm, ESPN2	No. 12	vs. No. 8 South Carolina; Sweet Sixteen	W 65–58	27–9	Maples Pavilion (6,700); Stanford, CA
04/01/2014*; 9:00 pm, ESPN	No. 12	at No. 6 Stanford; Elite Eight	L 65–74	27–10	Maples Pavilion (6,145); Stanford, CA
*Non-conference game. ^{#}Rankings from AP Poll. (#) Tournament seedings in parentheses. All times are in Eastern Time.

== Rankings ==
Ranking movement Legend: ██ Increase in ranking. ██ Decrease in ranking. NR = Not ranked. RV = Received votes.
Poll	Pre	Wk 2	Wk 3	Wk 4	Wk 5	Wk 6	Wk 7	Wk 8	Wk 9	Wk 10	Wk 11	Wk 12	Wk 13	Wk 14	Wk 15	Wk 16	Wk 17	Wk 18	Wk 19	Final
AP	12	12	12	11	18	15	14	10	10	13	9	7	6	13	17	11	14	13	12	
Coaches	11	14	12	12	16	14	13	11	11	12	9	7	6	11	10	8	11	12	13	

== See also ==
- 2013–14 North Carolina Tar Heels men's basketball team
