= 2013–14 Clemson Tigers women's basketball team =

Women's college basketball season

2013–14 Clemson Tigers women's basketball
- Conference: Atlantic Coast Conference
- Record: 13–19 (4–12 ACC)
- Head coach: Itoro Coleman (4th season)
- Assistant coaches: Daryl Oliver (1st season); Marc Wilson (1st season); Kayla Ard (1st season)
- Home arena: Littlejohn Coliseum

2013–14 ACC women's basketball standings
	Conf.				Overall
Team	W		L	PCT	W		L	PCT
No. 2 Notre Dame †	16	–	0	1.000	37	–	1	.974
No. 9 Duke	12	–	4	.750	28	–	7	.800
No. 11 Maryland	12	–	4	.750	28	–	7	.800
No. 16 NC State	11	–	5	.688	25	–	8	.758
Syracuse	10	–	6	.625	23	–	10	.697
No. 12 North Carolina	10	–	6	.625	27	–	10	.730
Georgia Tech	9	–	7	.563	20	–	12	.625
Miami (FL)	8	–	8	.500	16	–	15	.516
Florida State	7	–	9	.438	21	–	12	.636
Virginia	6	–	10	.375	14	–	17	.452
Wake Forest	5	–	11	.313	15	–	16	.484
Virginia Tech	4	–	12	.250	14	–	16	.467
Clemson	4	–	12	.250	13	–	19	.406
Pittsburgh	3	–	13	.188	11	–	20	.355
Boston College	3	–	13	.188	12	–	19	.387
† 2014 ACC tournament winner As of 8 April 2014; Rankings from AP poll

The 2013–14 Clemson Tigers women's basketball team represented Clemson University during the 2013–14 NCAA Division I women's basketball season. The Tigers were led by fourth year head coach Itoro Coleman. The Tigers, members of the Atlantic Coast Conference, played their home games at Littlejohn Coliseum.

== Schedule ==
Date time, TV	Rank^{#}	Opponent^{#}	Result	Record	Site city, state
November 8, 2013*		Davidson	L 57–77	0–1	Littlejohn Coliseum; Clemson, South Carolina
November 10, 2013*		Wofford	W 72–50	1–1	Littlejohn Coliseum; Clemson, South Carolina
November 17, 2013*		Cal State Northridge	L 53–69	1–2	Littlejohn Coliseum; Clemson, South Carolina
November 20, 2013*		No. 14 South Carolina rivalry	L 43–68	1–3	Littlejohn Coliseum; Clemson, South Carolina
November 24, 2013*		at South Florida	W 68–63	2–3	USF Sun Dome; Tampa, Florida
November 27, 2013*		Radford	W 41–39	3–3	Littlejohn Coliseum; Clemson, South Carolina
December 1, 2013*		North Florida	W 48–44	4–3	Littlejohn Coliseum; Clemson, South Carolina
December 5, 2013*		at UNC Greensboro	W 77–71	5–3	Fleming Gymnasium; Greensboro, North Carolina
December 14, 2013*		South Carolina State	W 88–46	6–3	Littlejohn Coliseum; Clemson, South Carolina
December 19, 2013*		at UNLV; Duel in the Desert	L 54–63	6–4	Cox Pavilion; Paradise, Nevada
December 20, 2013*		vs. Creighton; Duel in the Desert	W 56–52	7–4	Cox Pavilion; Paradise, Nevada
December 21, 2013*		vs. Oregon State; Duel in the Desert	L 41–74	7–5	Cox Pavilion; Paradise, Nevada
December 29, 2013*		Middle Tennessee	L 51–76	7–6	Littlejohn Coliseum; Clemson, South Carolina
January 2, 2014*		at NJIT	W 84–37	8–6	Fleisher Center; Newark, New Jersey
January 5, 2014		at No. 2 Notre Dame	L 51–71	8–7 (0–1)	Joyce Center; South Bend, Indiana
January 8, 2014		Georgia Tech	L 68–89	8–8 (0–2)	Littlejohn Coliseum; Clemson, South Carolina
January 12, 2014		Pittsburgh	W 77–67	9–8 (1–2)	Littlejohn Coliseum; Clemson, South Carolina
January 16, 2014		at No. 9 North Carolina	L 55–78	9–9 (1–3)	Carmichael Arena; Chapel Hill, North Carolina
January 20, 2014		Wake Forest	L 61–68	9–10 (1–4)	Littlejohn Coliseum; Clemson, South Carolina
January 23, 2014		at Syracuse	L 75–84	9–11 (1–5)	Carrier Dome; Syracuse, New York
January 26, 2014		Miami (FL)	W 60–52	10–11 (2–5)	Littlejohn Coliseum; Clemson, South Carolina
January 30, 2014		at Georgia Tech	W 80–79 ^{OT}	11–11 (3–5)	McCamish Pavilion; Atlanta, Georgia
February 2, 2014		at Virginia	L 43–80	11–12 (3–6)	John Paul Jones Arena; Charlottesville, Virginia
February 6, 2014		No. 5 Duke	L 51–78	11–13 (3–7)	Littlejohn Coliseum; Clemson, South Carolina
February 9, 2014		at No. 9 Maryland	L 43–95	11–14 (3–8)	Comcast Center; College Park, Maryland
February 13, 2014		No. 10 NC State	L 63–69 ^{OT}	11–15 (3–9)	Littlejohn Coliseum; Clemson, South Carolina
February 16, 2014		at Pittsburgh	L 43–56	11–16 (3–10)	Petersen Events Center; Pittsburgh, Pennsylvania
February 20, 2014		Boston College	W 72–67	12–16 (4–10)	Littlejohn Coliseum; Clemson, South Carolina
February 23, 2014		Florida State	L 43–59	12–17 (4–11)	Littlejohn Coliseum; Clemson, South Carolina
February 27, 2014		at Virginia Tech	L 48–74	12–18 (4–12)	Cassell Coliseum; Blacksburg, Virginia
ACC Tournament
March 5, 2014*		vs. Virginia Tech; ACC Tournament first round	W 69–56	13–18 (4–12)	Greensboro Coliseum; Greensboro, North Carolina
March 6, 2014*		vs. Syracuse; ACC Tournament second round	L 53–63	13–19 (4–12)	Greensboro Coliseum; Greensboro, North Carolina
*Non-conference game. ^{#}Rankings from AP Poll. (#) Tournament seedings in parentheses.
