= 2014 NCAA Division I women's basketball tournament =

- Season: 2013–14
- Teams: 64
- Finals site: Bridgestone Arena, Nashville, Tennessee
- Champions: UConn Huskies (9th title, 9th title game, 15th Final Four)
- Runner-up: Notre Dame Fighting Irish (4th title game, 6th Final Four)
- Semifinalists: Stanford Cardinal (12th Final Four); Maryland Terrapins (4th Final Four)
- Winning coach: Geno Auriemma (9th title)
- MOP: Breanna Stewart (UConn)

The 2014 NCAA Division I women's basketball tournament was played in March and April 2014, with the Final Four played April 6–8. The Ohio Valley Conference served as the host institution. The Final Four was played at Bridgestone Arena in Nashville, Tennessee.

Tennessee continued its streak of making every NCAA women's basketball tournament at 33 consecutive appearances. Connecticut (who made their seventh consecutive Final Four overall) and Notre Dame faced each other in the NCAA Final. Both were undefeated heading into the championship game, making it the first ever match up of two undefeated teams in the championship game. Connecticut prevailed, 79–58, to win their ninth national championship.

The previous day, Connecticut also won the men's tournament. It was just the second time in NCAA history the same school had won both the men's and women's tournament; UConn first accomplished that feat in 2004.

== Tournament procedure ==
Pending any changes to the format, a total of 64 teams will enter the 2014 tournament. 32 automatic bids shall be awarded to each program that wins their conference's tournament. The remaining 36 bids are "at-large", with selections extended by the NCAA Selection Committee. The tournament is split into four regional tournaments, and each regional has teams seeded from 1 to 16, with the committee ostensibly making every region as comparable to the others as possible. The top-seeded team in each region plays the #16 team, the #2 team plays the #15, etc. (meaning where the two seeds add up to 17, that team will be assigned to play another).

The basis for the subregionals returned to the approach used between 1982 and 2002; the top sixteen teams, as chosen in the bracket selection process, hosted the first two rounds on campus.

The Selection Committee will also seed the entire field from 1 to 64.

== Schedule and venues ==
There were 64 teams in the tournament, placed in a seeded bracket with four regions. Thirty-two teams received automatic bids—31 of which were their conference tournament champions; the other was for the Ivy League regular-season champion. An additional 32 teams were given at-large bids by the selection committee on the basis of their body of work during the regular season. Unlike the men's tournament, there was no "First Four" round.

First and second rounds (Subregionals)

The subregionals were played from March 22 to March 25, 2014. Sites chosen to host first- and second-round games in 2014 were:

2014 NCAA subregionals (hover over city to see link to host)
- March 22 and 24
  - Hilton Coliseum, Ames, Iowa (Host: Iowa State)
  - Cameron Indoor Stadium, Durham, North Carolina (Host: Duke)
  - Thompson–Boling Arena, Knoxville, Tennessee (Host: Tennessee)
  - Memorial Coliseum, Lexington, Kentucky (Host: Kentucky)
  - Pauley Pavilion, Los Angeles (Host: UCLA)
  - Savage Arena, Toledo, Ohio (Host: Toledo)
  - Ferrell Center, Waco, Texas (Host: Baylor)
  - Mackey Arena, West Lafayette, Indiana (Host: Purdue)
- March 23 and 25
  - Pete Maravich Assembly Center, Baton Rouge, Louisiana (Host: LSU)
  - Carmichael Arena, Chapel Hill, North Carolina (Host: North Carolina)
  - Comcast Center, College Park, Maryland (Host: Maryland)
  - Reed Arena, College Station, Texas (Host: Texas A&M)
  - Carver–Hawkeye Arena, Iowa City, Iowa (Host: Iowa)
  - Alaska Airlines Arena, Seattle (Host: Washington)
  - Harry A. Gampel Pavilion, Storrs, Connecticut (Host: Connecticut)
  - Bryce Jordan Center, University Park, Pennsylvania (Host: Penn State)

Regional semifinals and finals (Sweet Sixteen and Elite Eight)

2014 NCAA Regionals (blue) and Final Four (red) (Hover over city to see link to arena)

The Regionals, named for the city rather than the region of geographic importance since 2005, were held from March 29 to April 1 at the following sites:

- March 29 and 31
  - Lincoln Regional, Pinnacle Bank Arena, Lincoln, Nebraska (Host: Nebraska)
  - South Bend Regional, Joyce Center, Notre Dame, Indiana (Host: Notre Dame)
- March 30 and April 1
  - Louisville Regional, KFC Yum! Center, Louisville, Kentucky (Host: Louisville)
  - Stanford Regional, Maples Pavilion, Stanford, California (Host: Stanford)

National semifinals and championship (Final Four and national championship)

- April 6 & 8
  - Bridgestone Arena, Nashville, Tennessee (Hosts: Southeastern Conference/Ohio Valley Conference and Belmont University/Vanderbilt University)

It was the first time that Nashville had hosted a women's Final Four basketball tournament.

== Tournament records ==
- Team rebound margin – Notre Dame out rebounded Maryland 50 to 21; the margin of 29 is the widest margin in Final Four history
- Assists – Connecticut recorded 25 assists in the championship game against Notre Dame, the most ever recorded in a Final Four game since the NCAA began recording assists in 1985.
- Oklahoma scored 66 points in the second half of a first-round game against DePaul, the most points scored in a half of an NCAA tournament game, but lost to DePaul 104–100.

== Automatic qualifiers ==
The following teams earned automatic qualifiers for the 2014 NCAA field by virtue of winning their conference's tournament (except for the Ivy League, whose regular-season champion receives the automatic bid):

Conference	Team	Appearances	Last bid
ACC	Notre Dame	21	2013
America East	Albany	3	2013
American	Connecticut	26	2013
Atlantic 10	Fordham	2	1994
Atlantic Sun	Florida Gulf Coast	2	2012
Big 12	Baylor	13	2013
Big East	DePaul	19	2013
Big Sky	North Dakota	1	Never
Big South	Winthrop	1	Never
Big Ten	Nebraska	12	2013
Big West	Cal State Northridge	2	1999
Colonial	James Madison	10	2011
C-USA	Middle Tennessee	17	2013
Horizon	Wright State	1	Never
Ivy League	Penn	3	2004
MAAC	Marist	10	2013
MAC	Akron	1	Never
MEAC	Hampton	8	2013
Missouri Valley	Wichita State	2	2013
Mountain West	Fresno State	7	2013
Northeast	Robert Morris	3	2008
Ohio Valley	Tennessee-Martin	4	2013
Pac-12	USC	16	2006
Patriot	Army	2	2006
SEC	Tennessee	33	2013
Southern	Chattanooga	12	2013
Southland	Northwestern State	3	2004
SWAC	Prairie View A&M	6	2013
Summit	South Dakota	1	Never
Sun Belt	Western Kentucky	17	2008
West Coast	Gonzaga	7	2013
WAC	Idaho	3	2013

=== Tournament seeds ===
Lincoln RegionalPinnacle Bank Arena, Lincoln, Nebraska
Seed	School	Conference	Record	Berth type
1	Connecticut	American	34–0	Automatic
2	Duke	ACC	27–6	At-large
3	Texas A&M	SEC	24–8	At-large
4	Nebraska	Big Ten	25–6	Automatic
5	NC State	ACC	25–7	At-large
6	Gonzaga	West Coast	29–4	Automatic
7	DePaul	Big East	27–6	Automatic
8	Georgia	SEC	20–11	At-large
9	St. Joseph's	Atlantic 10	22–9	At-large
10	Oklahoma	Big 12	18–14	At-large
11	James Madison	Colonial	28–5	Automatic
12	BYU	West Coast	26–6	At-large
13	Fresno State	Mountain West	22–10	Automatic
14	North Dakota	Big Sky	22–9	Automatic
15	Winthrop	Big South	24–8	Automatic
16	Prairie View A&M	SWAC	14–17	Automatic

South Bend RegionalJoyce Center, Notre Dame, Indiana
Seed	School	Conference	Record	Berth type
1	Notre Dame	ACC	32–0	Automatic
2	Baylor	Big 12	29–4	Automatic
3	Kentucky	SEC	24–8	At-large
4	Purdue	Big Ten	21–8	At-large
5	Oklahoma State	Big 12	23–8	At-large
6	Syracuse	ACC	22–9	At-large
7	California	Pac-12	21–9	At-large
8	Vanderbilt	SEC	18–12	At-large
9	Arizona State	Pac-12	22–9	At-large
10	Fordham	Atlantic 10	25–7	Automatic
11	Chattanooga	Southern	29–3	Automatic
12	Florida Gulf Coast	Atlantic Sun	26–7	Automatic
13	Akron	Mid-American	23–9	Automatic
14	Wright State	Horizon	26–8	Automatic
15	Western Kentucky	Sun Belt	24–8	Automatic
16	Robert Morris	Northeast	21–11	Automatic

Stanford RegionalMaples Pavilion, Stanford, California
Seed	School	Conference	Record	Berth type
1	South Carolina	SEC	27–4	At-large
2	Stanford	Pac-12	29–3	At-large
3	Penn State	Big Ten	22–7	At-large
4	North Carolina	ACC	24–9	At-large
5	Michigan State	Big Ten	22–9	At-large
6	Dayton	Atlantic 10	23–7	At-large
7	Iowa State	Big 12	20–10	At-large
8	Middle Tennessee State	Conference USA	29–4	Automatic
9	Oregon State	Pac-12	23–10	At-large
10	Florida State	ACC	20–11	At-large
11	Florida	SEC	19–12	At-large
12	Hampton	MEAC	28–4	Automatic
13	Tennessee-Martin	Ohio Valley	24–7	Automatic
14	Wichita State	Missouri Valley	26–6	Automatic
15	South Dakota	Summit	19–13	Automatic
16	Cal State Northridge	Big West	18–14	Automatic

Louisville RegionalKFC Yum! Center, Louisville, Kentucky
Seed	School	Conference	Record	Berth type
1	Tennessee	SEC	27–5	Automatic
2	West Virginia	Big 12	29–4	At-large
3	Louisville	American	30–4	At-large
4	Maryland	ACC	24–6	At-large
5	Texas	Big 12	21–11	At-large
6	Iowa	Big Ten	26–8	At-large
7	LSU	SEC	19–12	At-large
8	St. John's	Big East	22–10	At-large
9	USC	Pac-12	22–12	Automatic
10	Georgia Tech	ACC	20–11	At-large
11	Marist	MAAC	27–6	Automatic
12	Penn	Ivy	22–6	Automatic
13	Army	Patriot	25–7	Automatic
14	Idaho	WAC	25–8	Automatic
15	Albany	America East	28–4	Automatic
16	Northwestern State	Southland	21–12	Automatic

== Bracket ==
* – Denotes overtime period

=== Lincoln Regional ===
In their first-round match, DePaul and Oklahoma scored a combined 204 points, setting a tournament record for most points in a non-overtime game. Oklahoma's 66 second-half points was also a record a team in a single half.

Connecticut vs. Prairie View A&M aired nationwide on ESPN. Connecticut vs. Saint Joseph's aired nationwide on ESPNU. All other games aired with whip-around or regional coverage on ESPN or ESPN2.

First round
1	UConn	87
16	Prairie View A&M	44
Storrs, Connecticut – Sun/Tue
8	Georgia	57
9	St. Joseph's	67
5	NC State	57
12	BYU	72
Los Angeles – Sat/Mon
4	Nebraska	74
13	Fresno State	55
6	Gonzaga	63
11	James Madison	72
College Station, Texas – Sun/Tue
3	Texas A&M	70
14	North Dakota	55
7	DePaul	104
10	Oklahoma	100
Durham, North Carolina – Sat/Mon
2	Duke	87
15	Winthrop	45

Second round
1	UConn	91
9	St. Joseph's	52
12	BYU	80
4	Nebraska	76
11	James Madison	69
3	Texas A&M	85
7	DePaul	74
2	Duke	65

Regional semifinals
1	UConn	70
12	BYU	51
3	Texas A&M	84
7	DePaul	65

Regional Finals
1	UConn	69
3	Texas A&M	54

=== Notre Dame Regional ===
Notre Dame vs. Robert Morris aired nationwide on ESPN. Notre Dame vs. Arizona State aired nationwide on ESPNews. All other games aired with whip-around or regional coverage on ESPN or ESPN2.

First round
1	Notre Dame	93
16	Robert Morris	42
Toledo, Ohio – Sat/Mon
8	Vanderbilt	61
9	Arizona State	69
5	Oklahoma State	61*
12	Florida Gulf Coast	60
West Lafayette, Indiana – Sat/Mon
4	Purdue	84
13	Akron	55
6	Syracuse	59
11	Chattanooga	53
Lexington, Kentucky – Sat/Mon
3	Kentucky	106
14	Wright State	60
7	California	64
10	Fordham	63
Waco, Texas – Sat/Mon
2	Baylor	87
15	Western Kentucky	74

Second round
1	Notre Dame	84
9	Arizona State	67
5	Oklahoma State	73
4	Purdue	66
6	Syracuse	59
3	Kentucky	64
7	California	56
2	Baylor	75

Regional semifinals
1	Notre Dame	89
5	Oklahoma State	72
3	Kentucky	72
2	Baylor	90

Regional Finals
1	Notre Dame	88
2	Baylor	69

=== Louisville Regional ===
First round
1	Tennessee	70
16	Northwestern State	46
Knoxville, Tennessee – Sat/Mon
8	St. John's	71
9	USC	68
5	Texas	79
12	Pennsylvania	61
College Park, Maryland – Sun/Tue
4	Maryland	90
13	Army	52
6	Iowa	87
11	Marist	65
Iowa City, Iowa – Sun/Tue
3	Louisville	88
14	Idaho	42
7	LSU	98
10	Georgia Tech	78
Baton Rouge, Louisiana – Sun/Tue
2	West Virginia	76
15	Albany	61

Second round
1	Tennessee	67
8	St. John's	51
5	Texas	64
4	Maryland	69
6	Iowa	53
3	Louisville	83
7	LSU	76
2	West Virginia	67

Regional semifinals
1	Tennessee	62
4	Maryland	73
3	Louisville	73
7	LSU	47

Regional Finals
4	Maryland	76
3	Louisville	73

=== Stanford Regional ===
First round
1	South Carolina	73
16	Cal. State Northridge	58
Seattle, Washington – Sun/Tue
8	Middle Tennessee	36
9	Oregon State	55
5	Michigan State	91
12	Hampton	61
Chapel Hill, North Carolina – Sun/Tue
4	North Carolina	60
13	Tennessee-Martin	58
6	Dayton	69
11	Florida	83
University Park, Pennsylvania – Sun/Tue
3	Penn State	62
14	Wichita State	56
7	Iowa State	44
10	Florida State	55
Ames, Iowa – Sat/Mon
2	Stanford	81
15	South Dakota	62

Second round
1	South Carolina	78
9	Oregon State	69
5	Michigan State	53
4	North Carolina	62
11	Florida	61
3	Penn State	83
10	Florida State	44
2	Stanford	63

Regional semifinals
1	South Carolina	58
4	North Carolina	65
3	Penn State	57
2	Stanford	82

Regional Finals
4	North Carolina	65
2	Stanford	74

=== Final Four – Nashville, Tennessee ===
National semifinals April 6
LI1	UConn	75
S2	Stanford	56
ND1	Notre Dame	87
LO4	Maryland	61

National championship game April 8
LI1	UConn	79
ND1	Notre Dame	58

==== Final Four summaries ====
ESPN

April 6, 2014
5:30 pm CDT

Recap

#4 Maryland Terrapins 61, #1 Notre Dame Fighting Irish 87
Scoring by half: 31-48, 30-39
Pts: Brionna Jones 16; Rebs: Alyssa Thomas 6 Asts: Lexie Brown 8	Pts: Kayla McBride 28; Rebs: Jewell Loyd, Markisha Wright 9 Asts: Lindsay Allen 5

Bridgestone Arena – Nashville, Tennessee
Attendance: 17,548
Referees: Scott Yarbrough, Cameron Inouye, Mike Price

ESPN

April 6, 2014
8:00 pm CDT

Recap

#2 Stanford Cardinal 56, #1 Connecticut Huskies 75
Scoring by half: 24-28, 32-47
Pts: Amber Orrange 16; Rebs: Chiney Ogwumike 10; Asts: Amber Orrange 5	Pts: Breanna Stewart 18; Rebs: Breanna Stewart, Stefanie Dolson 7 Asts: Moriah Jefferson, Bria Hartley 4

Bridgestone Arena – Nashville, Tennessee
Attendance: 17,548
Referees: Tina Napier, Joe Vaszily, Chuck Gonzales

==== National championship ====
ESPN

April 8, 2014
7:30 pm CDT

Recap

#1 Notre Dame Fighting Irish 58, #1 Connecticut Huskies 79
Scoring by half: 38-45, 20-34
Pts: Kayla McBride 21; Rebs: Jewell Loyd 6 Asts: Lindsay Allen 5	Pts: Breanna Stewart 21; Rebs: Stefanie Dolson 16; Asts: Stefanie Dolson, Moriah Jefferson 7

Bridgestone Arena – Nashville, Tennessee
Attendance: 17,570
Referees: Dee Kantner, Lisa Mattingly, Denise Brooks

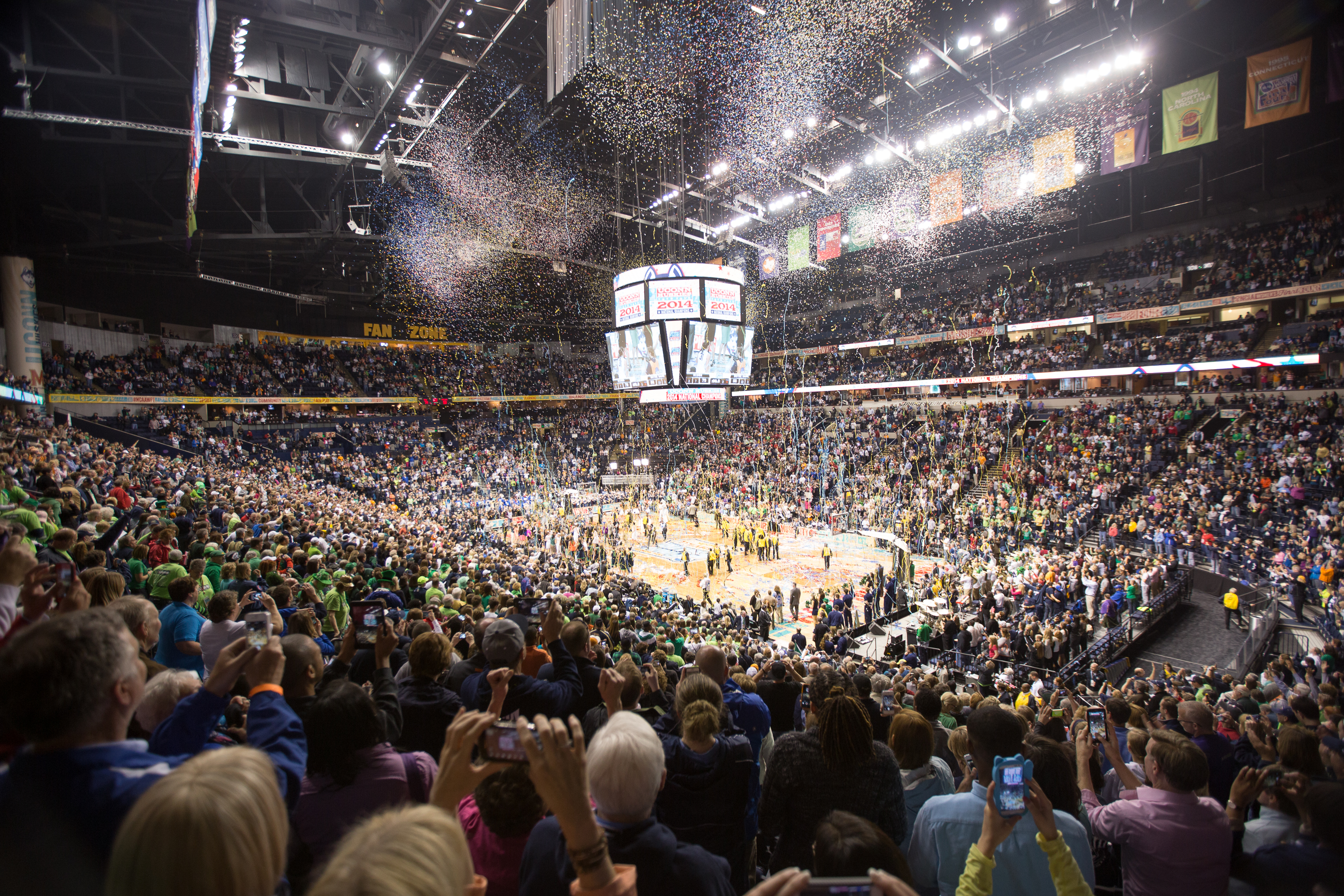
Final Four in Nashville

Undefeated Connecticut faced undefeated Notre Dame in the championship game, the first ever to feature two undefeated teams. After a hard-fought first half, the Connecticut Huskies pulled away in the second for a 79–58 victory. National Player of the Year Breanna Stewart scored 21 points for Connecticut. Stefanie Dolson added 17 points and 16 rebounds for the victors. Kayla McBride had 21 points for the Notre Dame Irish. Connecticut won the rebound battle 54–31 and held Notre Dame to a season low in points. After the game, Notre Dame coach Muffet McGraw said "I thought we were playing the Miami Heat for a while [Connecticut is] just that good."

By winning, Connecticut moved to 40–0 on the season and claimed their ninth title, surpassing Tennessee's eight titles for the most all-time. Coach Geno Auriemma said he was "flattered and grateful and all the things that come with this kind of accomplishment ... I'm more proud of the legacy that exists and what Connecticut basketball is as opposed to the number of championships." All nine of the school's titles, five with unbeaten records, have come during Auriemma's twenty seasons as head coach. Connecticut became the second school to finish the year 40–0, the other being Baylor. They have now won 46 consecutive games, the third most in NCAA history, but well short of their NCAA record of 90.

For Notre Dame, it was their third loss in the title game in the last four years. They were inhibited by the loss of senior starter Natalie Achonwa to injury in the Regional Final. The Irish had won seven of the previous nine meeting between the two powerhouses. However, Connecticut beat them during the tournament for the second consecutive year, having eliminated them in the Final Four in 2013.

== All-Tournament team ==
- Breanna Stewart, Connecticut
- Kaleena Mosqueda-Lewis, Connecticut
- Stefanie Dolson, Connecticut
- Kayla McBride, Notre Dame
- Jewell Loyd, Notre Dame

== Game Officials ==
- Chuck Gonzalez (semifinal)
- Cameron Inouye (semifinal)
- Tina Napier (semifinal)
- Mike Price (semifinal)
- Joe Vaszily (semifinal)
- Scott Yarbrough (semifinal)
- Denise Brooks (final)
- Dee Kanter (final)
- Joe Vasily (Standby)
- Lisa Mattingly (final)

== Record by conference ==
Conference	Bids	Record	Win %	R64	R32	S16	E8	F4	CG	NC
American	2	9–1	0.900	2	2	2	2	1	1	1
ACC	8	15–8	0.652	8	6	3	3	2	1	–
Big East	2	3–2	0.600	2	2	1	–	–	–	–
SEC	8	12–8	0.600	8	6	5	1	–	–	–
Pac-12	5	7–5	0.583	5	4	1	1	1	–	–
Big Ten	5	6–5	0.545	5	5	1	–	–	–	–
Big 12	6	7–6	0.538	6	4	2	1	–	–	–
West Coast	2	2–2	0.500	2	1	1	–	–	–	–
Colonial	1	1–1	0.500	1	1	–	–	–	–	–
Atlantic 10	3	1–3	0.250	3	1	–	–	–	–	–

- The R64, R32, S16, E8, F4, CG, and NC columns indicate how many teams from each conference were in the round of 64 (first round), round of 32 (second round), Sweet 16, Elite Eight, Final Four, championship game, and national champion, respectively.
- The America East, Atlantic Sun, Big Sky, Big South, Big West, Conference USA, Horizon, Ivy, MEAC, Metro Atlantic, Mid-American (MAC), Missouri Valley, Mountain West, Northeast, Ohio Valley, Patriot, Southern, Southland, Sun Belt, SWAC, and WAC conferences each had one representative that was eliminated in the first round.

== Media coverage ==
=== Television ===
ESPN had US television rights to all games during the tournament. For the first and second rounds, ESPN aired select games nationally on ESPN, ESPNU, or ESPNews. All other games aired regionally on ESPN or ESPN2 and streamed online via ESPN3. Most of the nation got whip-around coverage during this time, which allowed ESPN to rotate between the games and focus the nation on the one that has the closest score. The regional semifinals were split between ESPN and ESPN2, and ESPN aired the regional finals, national semifinals, and championship match.

==== Studio host & analysts ====
- Kevin Negandhi (Host)
- Kara Lawson (Analyst)
- Rebecca Lobo (Analyst)

==== Broadcast assignments ====
First & second rounds Saturday/Monday

- Mark Jones and LaChina Robinson – Durham, North Carolina
- Marc Kestecher and Brooke Weisbrod – Lexington, Kentucky
- Beth Mowins and Stephanie White – Toledo, Ohio
- Melissa Lee and Jimmy Dykes – West Lafayette, Indiana
- Clay Matvick and Fran Fraschilla – Ames, Iowa
- Joe Davis and Maria Taylor – Knoxville, Tennessee
- Dave Pasch and Doris Burke – Los Angeles, California
- Pam Ward and Carolyn Peck – Waco, Texas

Sweet Sixteen & Elite Eight Saturday/Monday

- Beth Mowins, Stephanie White, and Maria Taylor – South Bend, Indiana
- Pam Ward, Carolyn Peck, and LaChina Robinson – Lincoln, Nebraska

Final Four

- Dave O'Brien, Doris Burke, and Holly Rowe – Nashville, Tennessee

First & second rounds Sunday/Tuesday

- Cara Capuano and Nell Fortner – Baton Rouge, Louisiana
- Tom Hart and Mary Murphy – Chapel Hill, North Carolina
- Bob Wischusen and Christy Winters-Scott – College Park, Maryland
- Bob Picozzi and Krista Blunk – University Park, Pennsylvania
- Carter Blackburn and Rosalyn Gold-Onwude – College Station, Texas
- Holly Rowe and Brenda VanLengen – Iowa City, Iowa
- Dave Flemming and Sean Farnham – Seattle, Washington
- Dave O'Brien and Debbie Antonelli – Storrs, Connecticut

Sweet Sixteen & Elite Eight Sunday/Tuesday

- Dave O'Brien, Doris Burke, and Holly Rowe – Louisville, Kentucky
- Dave Pasch, Debbie Antonelli, and Brooke Weisbrod – Stanford, California

Championship

- Dave O'Brien, Doris Burke, and Holly Rowe – Nashville, Tennessee

=== Radio ===
Westwood One had nationwide broadcast and streaming radio rights from the regional finals on through the championship. The teams participating in the Regional Finals, Final Four, and championship were allowed to have their own local broadcasts, but were not allowed to stream their broadcast online.

Regional Finals Monday

- Jason Benetti and Krista Blunk – South Bend, Indiana
- Craig Way and Brenda VanLengen – Lincoln, Nebraska

Final Four

- Dave Ryan, Debbie Antonelli, and Krista Blunk – Nashville, Tennessee

Regional Finals Tuesday

- Dave Ryan and Ann Schatz – Louisville, Kentucky
- Brandon Gaudin and Ann Meyers Drysdale – Stanford, California

Championship

- Dave Ryan, Debbie Antonelli, and Krista Blunk – Nashville, Tennessee

== See also ==
- 2014 NCAA Division I men's basketball tournament
- 2014 National Invitation Tournament
- 2014 Women's National Invitation Tournament
