= 2013–14 Pittsburgh Panthers women's basketball team =

Intercollegiate basketball season

2013–14 Pittsburgh Panthers women's basketball
- Conference: Atlantic Coast Conference
- Record: 11–20 (3–13 ACC)
- Head coach: Suzie McConnell-Serio
- Assistant coaches: Kathy McConnell-Miller; Carmen Bruce; Lindsay Richards
- Home arena: Petersen Events Center

2013–14 ACC women's basketball standings
	Conf.				Overall
Team	W		L	PCT	W		L	PCT
No. 2 Notre Dame †	16	–	0	1.000	37	–	1	.974
No. 9 Duke	12	–	4	.750	28	–	7	.800
No. 11 Maryland	12	–	4	.750	28	–	7	.800
No. 16 NC State	11	–	5	.688	25	–	8	.758
Syracuse	10	–	6	.625	23	–	10	.697
No. 12 North Carolina	10	–	6	.625	27	–	10	.730
Georgia Tech	9	–	7	.563	20	–	12	.625
Miami (FL)	8	–	8	.500	16	–	15	.516
Florida State	7	–	9	.438	21	–	12	.636
Virginia	6	–	10	.375	14	–	17	.452
Wake Forest	5	–	11	.313	15	–	16	.484
Virginia Tech	4	–	12	.250	14	–	16	.467
Clemson	4	–	12	.250	13	–	19	.406
Pittsburgh	3	–	13	.188	11	–	20	.355
Boston College	3	–	13	.188	12	–	19	.387
† 2014 ACC tournament winner As of 8 April 2014; Rankings from AP poll

The 2013–14 Pittsburgh Panthers women's basketball team represented the University of Pittsburgh in the 2013–14 NCAA Division I women's basketball season. The Panthers were led by first-year head coach Suzie McConnell-Serio. They were a member of the Atlantic Coast Conference, and played their home games at the Petersen Events Center in Pittsburgh, Pennsylvania.

== Previous season ==
In the 2012-13 season, Pitt's final in the Big East Conference, the Pitt women were without a single senior on their roster. Star recruit, six-foot, 11-inch center Marvadene "Bubbles" Anderson was redshirted for the season. Pitt compiled a 9-21 record, and for the second year in a row, went 0-16 in the conference, prompting the replacement of head coach Agnus Berenato with Suzie McConnell-Serio on April 12, 2013.

== Season ==
New coach Pitt hired Suzie McConnell-Serio to replace Berenato as head coach. The 2013–14 season was Pitt's first competing in the Atlantic Coast Conference. Pitt returned 11 players from the previous season. including seniors Asia Logan and Ashlee Anderson. 6'11" redshirt freshman "Bubbles" Anderson saw her first collegiate action. Players not with the team from the previous season included redshirt junior guard Abby Dowd, a former Buffalo transfer, and freshman forward Krista Pettepier, who transferred to Pepperdine. Roster additions included freshmsn guard Fréderique Potvin of Montreal, Quebec, Canada, and freshman guard Chelsea Welch of Kettering, Ohio.

== Roster ==
2013–14 Pittsburgh Panthers women's basketball team
Players
Coaches

Pos.	#	Name	Height	Year	Previous school	Hometown
F/C	0	Asia Logan	6 ft 0 in (1.83 m)	Sr	Digital Harbor	Baltimore, MD
G	1	Loliya Briggs	5 ft 11 in (1.8 m)	RS So	Potter's House Christian Academy	Gainesville, FL
G	3	Brianna Kiesel	5 ft 7 in (1.7 m)	Jr	Thomas R. Proctor	Utica, NY
G	13	Marquel Davis	5 ft 9 in (1.75 m)	Sr	Stafford	Fredericksburg, VA
G	14	Fréderique Potvin	5 ft 11 in (1.8 m)	Fr	Vanier College	Montreal, Quebec, Canada
G	22	Chelsea Welch	5 ft 9 in (1.75 m)	Fr	Fairmont	Kettering, OH
G	23	Ashlee Anderson	5 ft 9 in (1.75 m)	RS Sr	Whitney M. Young Magnet	Chicago, IL
G	24	Brianna Brizzi	5 ft 6 in (1.68 m)	Jr	Fauquier	Warrenton, VA
G	25	Brittany Gordon	5 ft 8 in (1.73 m)	So	South Charleston	South Charleston, WV
G	31	Bridget Higgins	5 ft 8 in (1.73 m)	So	Mount Saint Joseph Academy	Lafayette Hill, PA
F/C	34	Chyna Golden	6 ft 2 in (1.88 m)	Jr	Neptune	Neptune, NJ
C	44	Marvadene Anderson	6 ft 11 in (2.11 m)	RS Fr	Rutgers Prep (NJ)	Clarendon, Jamaica
F/C	51	Cora McManus	6 ft 0 in (1.83 m)	Jr	Garfield	Seattle, WA

Head coach

Suzie McConnell

Assistant coach(es)

Kathy McConnell
Carmen Bruce
Lindsay Richards

Legend

- (C) Team captain
- (S) Suspended
- (I) Ineligible
- (W) Walk-on
- Injured
- Current redshirt

Roster
Last update: 2013-09-11

== Schedule ==
On May 29, 2013, Pitt released its conference opponents for the 2013–2014 season, its first competing in the Atlantic Coast Conference. They had home games against Boston College, Clemson, Florida State, Georgia Tech, Notre Dame, North Carolina State, Wake Forest, and Syracuse. Away games consisted of Clemson, Duke, Maryland, Miami, North Carolina, Syracuse, Virginia, and Virginia Tech. Home and away partners were Clemson and Syracuse.

Pitt's 2013–14 women's basketball schedule is as follows.

Date time, TV	Rank^{#}	Opponent^{#}	Result	Record	Site (attendance) city, state
Exhibition
Sun, Nov. 3*; 2:00 pm		California (PA)	W 97–67	–	Petersen Events Center (1,167); Pittsburgh, PA
Regular season
Fri, Nov. 8*; 11:00 am		Bucknell	W 66–51	1–0	Petersen Events Center (4,698); Pittsburgh, PA
Thu, Nov. 14*; 7:00 pm		at Ball State	W 63–58	2–0	John E. Worthen Arena (851); Muncie, IN
Sun, Nov. 17*; 1:00 pm		Lafayette	L 45–48	2–1	Petersen Events Center (1,003); Pittsburgh, PA
Wed, Nov. 20*; 7:00 pm		at Michigan	L 75–83	2–2	Crisler Center (1,339); Ann Arbor, MI
Sat, Nov. 23*; 1:00 pm		at Loyola (MD)	W 60–54	3–2	Reitz Arena (370); Baltimore, MD
Tue, Nov. 26*; 7:00 pm		Mount St. Mary's	W 78–43	4–2	Petersen Events Center (1,015); Pittsburgh, PA
Sun, Dec. 1*; 2:00 pm		Buffalo	L 62–66	4–3	Petersen Events Center (1,566); Pittsburgh, PA
Wed, Dec. 4*; 7:00 pm		James Madison	L 61–71	4–4	Petersen Events Center (1,102); Pittsburgh, PA
Sat, Dec. 7*; 12:00 pm		at Wagner	W 69–54	5–4	Spiro Sports Center (511); Staten Island, NY
Sun, Dec. 15*; 2:00 pm		Old Dominion	W 63–49	6–4	Petersen Events Center (1,054); Pittsburgh, PA
Thu, Dec. 19*; 3:00 pm		vs. DePaul; Duel in the Desert	L 63–77	6–5	Cox Pavilion (826); Las Vegas, NV
Fri, Dec. 20*; 3:00 pm		vs. Louisiana–Monroe; Duel in the Desert	W 76–61	7–5	Cox Pavilion (753); Las Vegas, NV
Sat, Dec. 21*; 3:00 pm		vs. Washington; Duel in the Desert	L 69–76	7–6	Cox Pavilion (862); Las Vegas, NV
Sun, Dec. 29*; 6:00 pm		Duquesne; City Game	W 67–57	8–6	Petersen Events Center (2,681); Pittsburgh, PA
Thu, Jan. 2; 7:00 pm, ESPN3		No. 21 Florida State	L 69–78	8–7 (0–1)	Petersen Events Center (978); Pittsburgh, PA
Sun, Jan. 5; 2:00 pm		at Virginia	W 79–75	9–7 (1–1)	John Paul Jones Arena (3,597); Charlottesville, VA
Sun, Jan. 12; 2:00 pm		at Clemson	L 67–77	9–8 (1–2)	Littlejohn Coliseum (679); Clemson, SC
Thu, Jan. 16; 7:00 pm, ESPN3		No. 2 Notre Dame	L 66–109	9–9 (1–3)	Petersen Events Center (2,768); Pittsburgh, PA
Sun, Jan. 19; 2:00 pm, ESPN3		Syracuse	L 47–58	9–10 (1–4)	Petersen Events Center (4,649); Pittsburgh, PA
Sun, Jan. 26; 2:00 pm, ESPN3		at No. 3 Duke	L 67–111	9–11 (1–5)	Cameron Indoor Stadium (4,504); Durham, NC
Thu, Jan. 30; 7:00 pm, ESPN3		Boston College	W 67–65	10–11 (2–5)	Petersen Events Center (1,021); Pittsburgh, PA
Mon, Feb. 3; 7:00 pm, ESPN3		Georgia Tech	L 66–77	10–12 (2–6)	Petersen Events Center (1,035); Pittsburgh, PA
Thu, Feb. 6; 7:00 pm		at No. 10 Maryland	L 46–94	10–13 (2–7)	Comcast Center (3,758); College Park, MD
Sun, Feb. 9; 2:00 pm		Wake Forest	L 70–74	10–14 (2–8)	Petersen Events Center (1,315); Pittsburgh, PA
Thu, Feb. 13; 6:00 pm, ESPN3		at No. 17 North Carolina	L 50-86	10–15 (2-9)	Carmichael Arena (2,813); Chapel Hill, NC
Sun, Feb. 16; 2:00 pm		Clemson; Pink the Petersen/Play 4Kay	W 56–43	11–15 (3–9)	Petersen Events Center (3,305); Pittsburgh, PA
Thu, Feb. 20; 7:00 pm, ESPN3		at Virginia Tech	L 62–69	11–16 (3–10)	Cassell Coliseum (1,631); Blacksburg, VA
Sun, Feb. 23; 1:00 pm		at Syracuse	L 36–67	11–17 (3–11)	Carrier Dome (1,532); Syracuse, NY
Thu, Feb. 27; 7:00 pm, ESPN		No. 13 NC State	L 68–79	11–18 (3–12)	Petersen Events Center (1,135); Pittsburgh, PA
Sun, Mar. 2; 1:00 pm, Raycom		at Miami (FL)	L 54–67	11–19 (3–13)	BankUnited Center (1,463); Coral Gables, FL
2014 ACC women's basketball tournament
Wed, Mar. 5; 6:30 pm, Root Sports/ESPN3	(14)	vs. (11) Wake Forest; First round	L 58–72	11–20	Greensboro Coliseum (4,950); Greensboro, NC
*Non-conference game. ^{#}Rankings from Division I AP Poll unless otherwise noted. (#) during postseason tournaments is seed with region, if applicable. (#) Tournament seedings in parentheses. All times are in Eastern Standard Time.

== Rankings ==
Ranking movement Legend: ██ Improvement in ranking. ██ Decrease in ranking. ██ Not ranked the previous week. rv = Others receiving votes.
Poll	Pre	Wk 1	Wk 2	Wk 3	Wk 4	Wk 5	Wk 6	Wk 7	Wk 8	Wk 9	Wk 10	Wk 11	Wk 12	Wk 13	Wk 14	Wk 15	Wk 16	WK 17	Wk 18	Final
AP																				
Coaches																				
