= 2014 NCAA Division I women's basketball championship game =

Women's basketball championship game

2014 NCAA Tournament Championship Game
National championship game
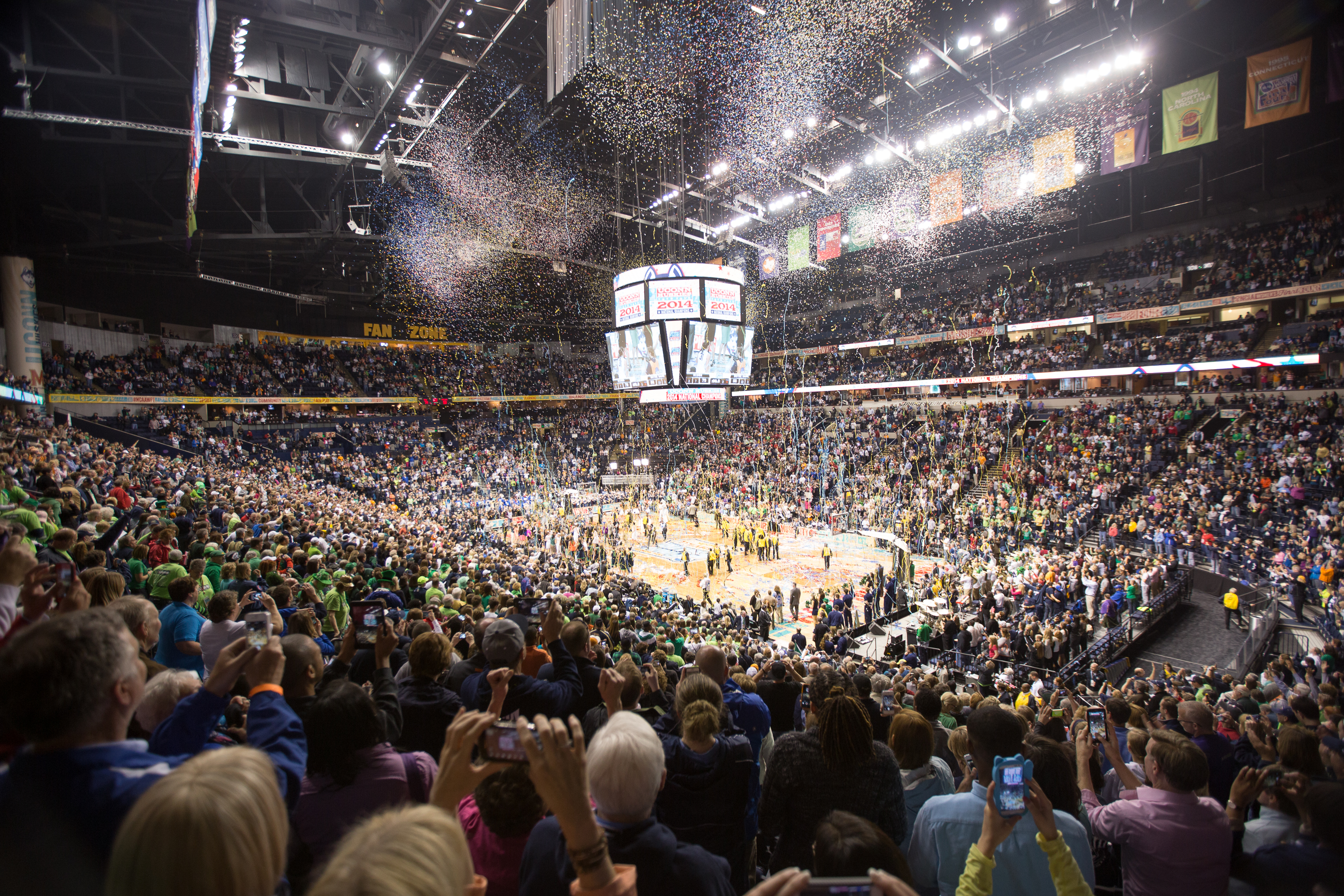
- Bridgestone Arena after the championship game.
Notre Dame Fighting Irish	UConn Huskies
(37–0)	(39–0)
58	79
Head coach: Muffet McGraw	Head coach: Geno Auriemma
- AP: 2
- Coaches: 2
- AP: 1
- Coaches: 1
	1st half	2nd half	Total
Notre Dame Fighting Irish	38	20	58
UConn Huskies	45	34	79
- Date: April 8, 2014
- Venue: Bridgestone Arena, Nashville, Tennessee
- MVP: Breanna Stewart, UConn

United States TV coverage
- Network: ESPN
- Announcers: Dave O'Brien (play-by-play); Doris Burke (analyst); Holly Rowe (sideline)

The 2014 NCAA Division I women's basketball championship game was the final game of the 2014 NCAA Division I women's basketball tournament. It determined the national champion for the 2013–14 NCAA Division I women's basketball season. The game matched the Notre Dame Fighting Irish and the UConn Huskies and was played on April 8, 2014, at the Bridgestone Arena in Nashville, Tennessee.

UConn and Notre Dame both entered the game unbeaten, making this the first championship game to be held between two undefeated teams. Both teams came in with talented rosters; eight of the game's ten starting players were eventually drafted in a WNBA draft. UConn overpowered Notre Dame to win the game by 21 points and break the record with their ninth NCAA Division I championship.

== Participants ==
The championship game, described as a "dream matchup" by UConn head coach Geno Auriemma, matched the Notre Dame Fighting Irish with the UConn Huskies and was the first title game to be contested by two undefeated teams.

=== Notre Dame ===
Notre Dame, led by 27th-year head coach Muffet McGraw, ended the regular season with a perfect 29–0 record, including a 16–0 mark in Atlantic Coast Conference games. They were the No. 1 seed in the ACC tournament, where they defeated No. 9 seed Florida State, No. 4 seed NC State, and No. 2 seed Duke en route to their first ACC Tournament title and their seventh conference tournament championship in program history. They received a No. 1 seed and were placed in the eponymous Notre Dame Regional at the NCAA tournament. In the tournament, the Fighting Irish defeated No. 16 seed Robert Morris and No. 9 seed Arizona State to reach their 12th Sweet Sixteen. From there, the Irish defeated No. 5 seed Oklahoma State and No. 2 seed Baylor to reach the Final Four for the sixth time.

In the Final Four, Notre Dame met No. 4 seed Maryland, champions of the Louisville Regional. A convincing win put the Fighting Irish in the national championship game for the fourth time; they entered seeking their second title.

=== UConn ===
UConn, led by 29th-year head coach Geno Auriemma, finished the regular season with a perfect 31–0 record, including an 18–0 mark in American Athletic Conference play. They received the No. 1 seed in the AAC tournament, where they defeated No. 8 seed Cincinnati, No. 4 seed Rutgers, and No. 2 seed Louisville to win their first AAC Tournament title and the 19th conference tournament title in program history. In the NCAA Tournament, UConn received the No. 1 overall seed and was placed in the Lincoln Regional, where they defeated No. 16 seed Prairie View A&M and No. 9 seed St. Joseph's to reach the Sweet Sixteen for the 22nd time. They then beat No. 12 seed BYU and No. 3 seed Texas A&M to win the regional and reach the Final Four for the 15th time in school history.

In the Final Four, the Huskies met No. 2 seed Stanford, the champions of the Stanford Regional, whom they defeated to reach the national championship for the ninth time. The Huskies entered seeking to maintain their perfect record in national title games with their ninth championship.

== Starting lineups ==
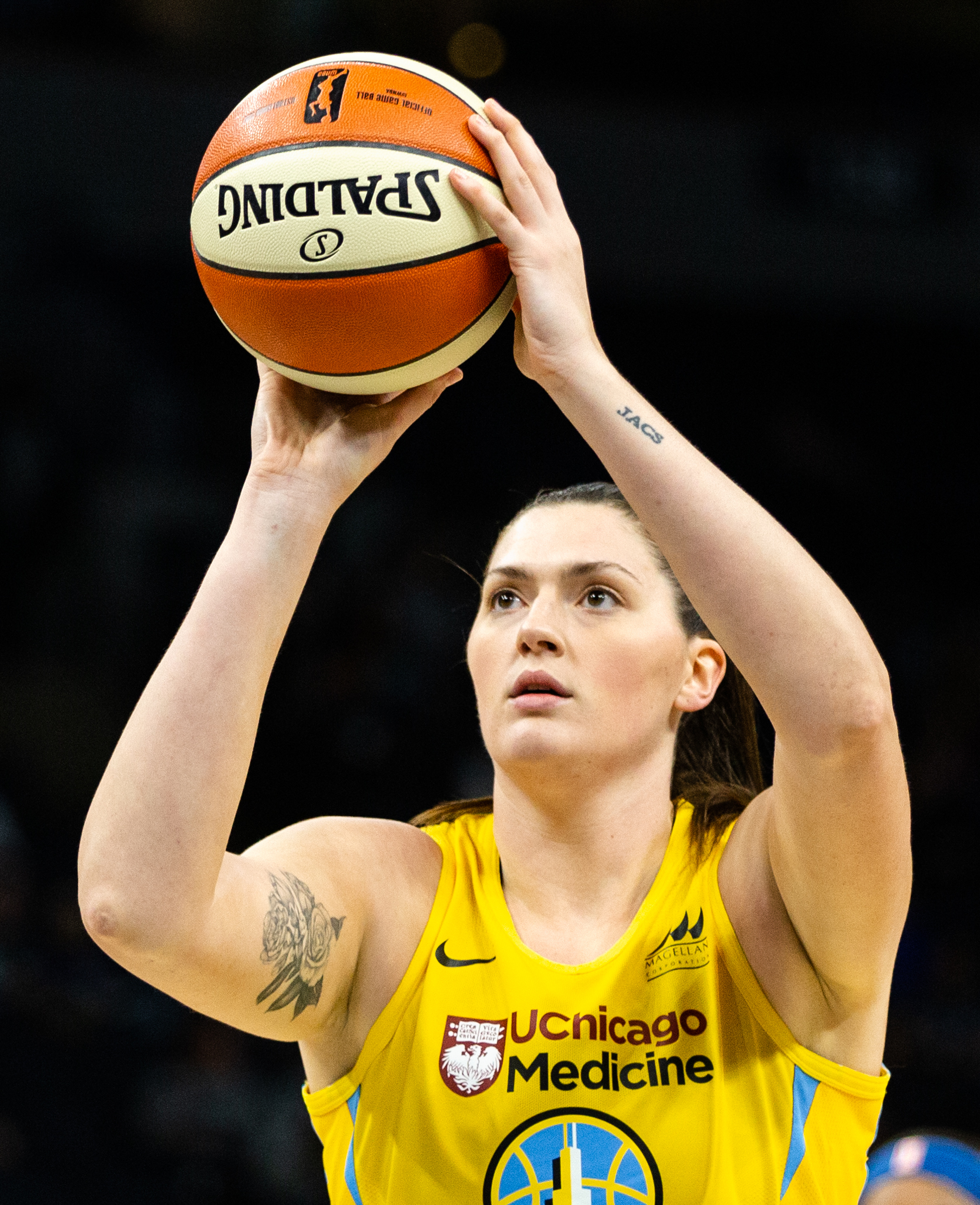
UConn's Stefanie Dolson led the Huskies in rebounds and was one of three championship game participants selected in the first round of the 2015 WNBA draft

Of the ten starting players for both teams, eight were eventually drafted in a WNBA draft. Three players – Notre Dame's Kayla McBride and UConn's Bria Hartley and Stefanie Dolson – were selected in the first round of the 2014 draft, which immediately followed the conclusion of the 2013–14 season. Notre Dame's Jewell Loyd and UConn's Kaleena Mosqueda-Lewis were both first round picks in 2015, while UConn's Breanna Stewart and Moriah Jefferson were first round picks in 2016. The last of the game's starting players to be drafted was Notre Dame's Lindsay Allen, who was a second round pick in 2017.

Notre Dame	Position		UConn
Taya Reimer	F		Breanna Stewart 1
Ariel Braker	F		Kaleena Mosqueda-Lewis 1
Lindsay Allen 2	G		Moriah Jefferson 1
Jewell Loyd 1	G		Bria Hartley 1
Kayla McBride 1	G	C	Stefanie Dolson 1
Players selected in a WNBA draft (number indicates round) • Source

== Game summary ==
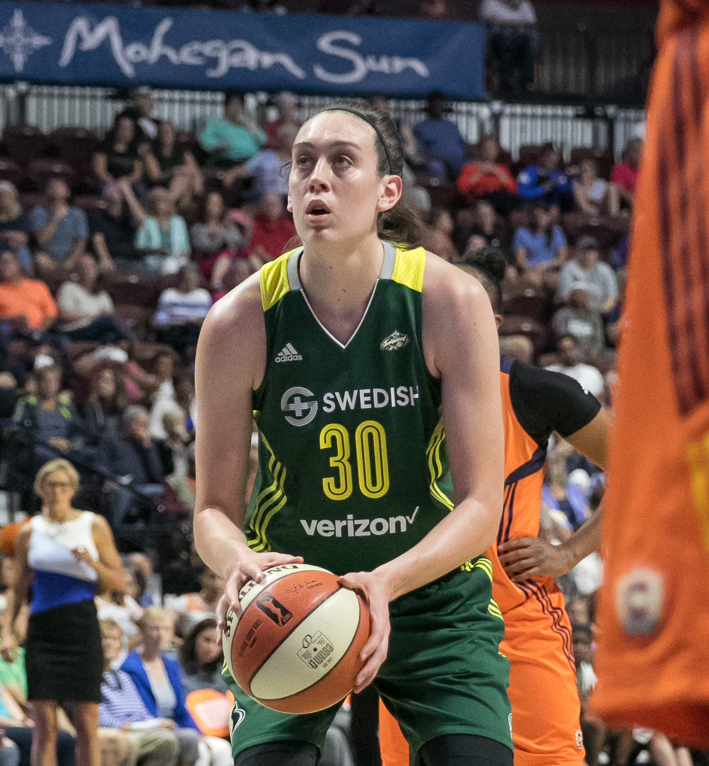
Breanna Stewart scored 21 points to lead UConn

UConn controlled the game's tip-off and scored their first points of the contest ten seconds later. Both offenses got out to a strong start, with both teams holding leads within the first five minutes of the game and combining for 16 points with 15 minutes to play in the opening half. With just over five minutes elapsed, a Stefanie Dolson layup broke an 8–8 tie to give UConn back the lead; the Huskies would hold this lead for the remainder of the game. Dolson's layup was the second field goal in what would become a 14–0 Huskies run that gave them a 22–8 lead with eleven minutes to play. Trailing by 13 at the halfway point of the first half, the Fighting Irish were able to narrow the Huskies' lead to as few as six points over the next few minutes, but UConn was able to hold the lead steady and go into halftime with the score 45–38. Entering the second half leading by seven, UConn jumped out to a 10–2 run, spurred by field goals from Kaleena Mosqueda-Lewis, Bria Hartley, Breanna Stewart, and Stefanie Dolson. Trailing 55–40, Notre Dame's Kayla McBride made a two-point jumper with just over fifteen minutes to play, narrowing the deficit to thirteen, but UConn's offense did not let up, as they reapplied pressure and increased the lead to 21 points with 12 minutes to play. The teams largely traded baskets for the next few minutes, with the margin hovering around the 20-point mark and peaking at 24 with just under four minutes to play. Notre Dame made no serious attempt to stop the clock, via fouls or any other method, and the game ended with UConn the victors, 79–58. With their victory, UConn broke the NCAA Division I record with their ninth national championship.

ESPN

April 8, 2014
7:30 p.m. CDT

Report

No. 1 Notre Dame Fighting Irish 58, No. 1 UConn Huskies 79
Scoring by half: 38–45, 20–34
Pts: McBride 21; Rebs: Loyd 6 Asts: Allen 5	Pts: Stewart 21; Rebs: Dolson 16; Asts: Dolson, Jefferson 7

Bridgestone Arena – Nashville, Tennessee
Attendance: 17,519
Referees: Lisa Mattingly, Dee Kantner, Denise Brooks

== Media coverage ==
The entire women's tournament, including the championship game, was televised in the United States by ESPN. The championship game drew an average viewership of 3.21 million households, which was the fourth-best mark for a women's basketball broadcast in ten years and the fourth-highest for any ESPN women's basketball championship broadcast. This also marked a 40% viewership increase from the last edition. The 100,000 viewers on WatchESPN also set an all-time high for a women's basketball broadcast.

== See also ==
- 2014 NCAA Division I men's basketball championship game, which the UConn Huskies also won.
- 2014 NCAA Division I women's basketball tournament
