= Houston Cougars basketball =

Houston Cougars basketball may refer to either of the basketball teams that represent University of Houston:

- Houston Cougars men's basketball
- Houston Cougars women's basketball
