= 2013–14 Houston Cougars women's basketball team =

Intercollegiate basketball season

2013–14 Houston Cougars women's basketball
- Conference: American Athletic Conference
- Record: 5–22 (1–15 The American)
- Head coach: Todd Buchanan (3rd season; until December 22); Wade Scott (interim; remainder of the season)
- Assistant coaches: Brittany Mason; Ravon Justice; Leah Foster
- Home arena: Hofheinz Pavilion

2013–14 American Athletic Conference women's basketball standings
	Conf.				Overall
Team	W		L	PCT	W		L	PCT
No. 1 UConn†	18	–	0	1.000	40	–	0	1.000
No. 4 Louisville	16	–	2	.889	33	–	5	.868
South Florida	13	–	5	.722	23	–	13	.639
Rutgers	12	–	6	.667	28	–	9	.757
SMU	8	–	10	.444	18	–	14	.563
Temple	8	–	10	.444	14	–	16	.467
Memphis	6	–	12	.333	13	–	18	.419
Cincinnati	5	–	13	.278	13	–	18	.419
UCF	3	–	15	.167	10	–	20	.333
Houston	1	–	17	.056	6	–	25	.194
† American Tournament winner winner As of 8 April 2014; Rankings from AP poll

The 2013–14 Houston Cougars women's basketball team represented the University of Houston during the 2013–14 NCAA Division I women's basketball season. This was the Cougars' first season as members of the American Athletic Conference. The team was coached by Todd Buchanan until his resignation on December 21, 2013, having played 11 games of their schedule. The remainder of the season was coached by interim head coach Wade Scott. The team played their home games at Hofheinz Pavilion.

== Roster ==
2013–14 Houston Cougars women's basketball team
Players
Coaches

Pos.	#	Name	Height	Year	Previous school	Hometown
G	0	Alexia Sanders	5 ft 8 in (1.73 m)	Fr	College Park HS	The Woodlands, Texas
G	1	Demetria Foreman	5 ft 6 in (1.68 m)	Jr	MacArthur HS; Angelina JC	Irving, TX
G	3	Bianca Winlow	5 ft 7 in (1.7 m)	So	Bellaire HS	Bellaire, TX
F	12	Destini Texada	6 ft 0 in (1.83 m)	Sr	Elsik HS; Houston Baptist	Houston, TX
G	15	Alecia Smith	5 ft 7 in (1.7 m)	So	Cedar Hill HS	Cedar Hill, TX
C	20	Yasmeen Thompson	6 ft 2 in (1.88 m)	Sr	Freire Charter; Paris JC	Philadelphia, PA
G	21	Jessieka Palmer	6 ft 1 in (1.85 m)	So	La Marque HS	La Marque, TX
F	22	Marche' Amerson	6 ft 1 in (1.85 m)	So	Rudder HS	Bryan, TX
F	24	Marissa Ashton	6 ft 1 in (1.85 m)	Sr	Dickinson HS; Texas Tech	Dickinson, TX
C	25	Mae Woods	6 ft 4 in (1.93 m)	Sr	Maple Ridge Secondary	Maple Ridge, British Columbia
F	32	Te'onna Campbell	5 ft 10 in (1.78 m)	Sr	Chaffey HS; New Mexico JC	Ontario, CA
F	33	Tyler Gilbert	6 ft 2 in (1.88 m)	So	Hightower HS	Missouri City, TX
F	34	Terran Alford	6 ft 1 in (1.85 m)	Jr	Home Schooled	Oklahoma City, OK
F	35	Taylor Gilbert	6 ft 2 in (1.88 m)	RS Fr	Hightower HS	Missouri City, TX

Head coach

- Wade Scott (interim) (Eastern New Mexico)

Assistant coach(es)

- Brittany Mason (Houston)
- Ravon Justice (Houston Baptist)
- Leah Foster (Texas State)

Legend

- (C) Team captain
- (S) Suspended
- (I) Ineligible
- (W) Walk-on
- Injured
- Current redshirt

Roster
Last update: 2013-11-17

== Schedule and results ==
Date time, TV	Rank^{#}	Opponent^{#}	Result	Record	Site (attendance) city, state
Exhibition
Nov 2*; 2:00 pm		Lubbock Christian	W 80–73	0–0	Hofheinz Pavilion (N/A); Houston, TX
Non-conference regular season
Nov 8*; 5:30 pm		Mississippi State	L 68–76	0–1	Hofheinz Pavilion (609); Houston, TX
Nov 13*; 7:00 pm		at Northwestern State	L 70–74	0–2	Prather Coliseum (603); Natchotoches, LA
Nov 17*; 3:30 pm		No. 12 Texas A&M	L 51–63	0–3	Hofheinz Pavilion (942); Houston, TX
Nov 20*; 1:00 pm		North Texas	W 66–61	1–3	Hofheinz Pavilion (563); Houston, TX
Nov 23*; 6:05 pm		at Creighton	L 55–65	1–4	D. J. Sokol Arena (981); Omaha, NE
Nov 30*; 2:30 pm		Kent State; David Jones Memorial Classic	W 54–44	2–4	Hofheinz Pavilion (642); Houston, TX
Dec 1*; 3:30 pm		Prairie View A&M; David Jones Memorial Classic	W 74–46	3–4	Hofheinz Pavilion (621); Houston, TX
Dec 4*; 7:00 pm		Washington	L 55–66	3–5	Hofheinz Pavilion (420); Houston, TX
Dec 8*; 2:00 pm		at Alabama	L 44–51	3–6	Foster Auditorium (847); Tuscaloosa, AL
Dec 15*; 2:00 pm		at Texas State	L 63–70	3–7	Strahan Coliseum (935); San Marcos, TX
Dec 20*; 1:00 pm		at Rice	W 67–54	4–7	Tudor Fieldhouse (311); Houston, TX
American Athletic Conference regular season
Dec 28; 2:00 pm, AAC Digital		UCF	L 59–67	4–8 (0–1)	Hofheinz Pavilion (669); Houston, TX
Dec 31; 2:00 pm, ESPN3		South Florida	L 54–77	4–9 (0–2)	Hofheinz Pavilion (555); Houston, TX
Jan 4; 11:00 am		at Rutgers	L 47–68	4–10 (0–3)	Louis Brown Athletic Center (1,214); Piscataway, NJ
Jan 7; 6:00 pm, SNY		at No. 1 Connecticut	L 40–90	4–11 (0–4)	Gampel Pavilion (6,257); Storrs, CT
Jan 11; 2:00 pm		Cincinnati	L 50–59	4–12 (0–5)	Hofheinz Pavilion (822); Houston, TX
Jan 18; 4:00 pm		at Memphis	L 40–48	4–13 (0–6)	FedEx Forum (1,546); Memphis, TN
Jan 21; 7:00 pm, ESPN3		No. 5 Louisville	L 52–93	4–14 (0–7)	Hofheinz Pavilion (1,025); Houston, TX
Jan 25; 2:00 pm, AAC Digital		SMU	L 60–73	4–15 (0–8)	Hofheinz Pavilion (723); Houston, TX
Jan 29; 6:00 pm, AAC Digital		at South Florida	L 53–71	4–16 (0–9)	USF Sun Dome (1,189); Tampa, FL
Feb 1; 3:00 pm, AAC Digital		at UCF	L 43–52	4–17 (0–10)	CFE Arena (696); Orlando, FL
Feb 4; 7:00 pm		Temple	L 46–79	4–18 (0–11)	Hofheinz Pavilion (469); Houston, TX
Feb 8; 1:00 pm, AAC Digital		at Cincinnati	W 48–39	5–18 (1–11)	Fifth Third Arena (429); Cincinnati, OH
Feb 11; 7:00 pm		Rutgers	L 42–74	5–19 (1–12)	Hofheinz Pavilion (442); Houston, TX
Feb 15; 2:00 pm, AAC Digital		at SMU	L 50–67	5–20 (1–13)	Moody Coliseum (1,032); Dallas, TX
Feb 19; 6:00 pm, WHAS		at No. 3 Louisville	L 62–81	5–21 (1–14)	KFC Yum! Center (7,408); Louisville, KY
Feb 22; 4:00 pm, SNY		No. 1 Connecticut	L 41–92	5–22 (1–15)	Hofheinz Pavilion (1,569); Houston, TX
Mar 1; 2:00 pm, AAC Digital		Memphis	L 45–55	5–23 (1–16)	Hofheinz Pavilion (569); Houston, TX
Mar 3; 6:00 pm		at Temple	L 54–66	5–24 (1–17)	Liacouras Center (622); Philadelphia, PA
2014 American Athletic Conference women's basketball tournament
Mar 7; 8:00 pm		vs. Memphis	W 73–67	6–24 (1–17)	Mohegan Sun Arena (4,675); Uncasville, CT
Mar 8		vs. No. 3 Louisville	L 43–88	6–25 (1–17)	Mohegan Sun Arena; Uncasville, CT
*Non-conference game. ^{#}Rankings from AP Poll. (#) Tournament seedings in parentheses. All times are in Central Time.

== See also ==
- 2013–14 Houston Cougars men's basketball team
