= 2008–09 Houston Cougars women's basketball team =

Intercollegiate basketball season

2008–09 Houston Cougars women's basketball
- Conference: Conference USA
- Record: 19-10 (11-5 C-USA)
- Head coach: Joe Curl
- Assistant coaches: Wade Scott; Amanda Barksdale; Elena Lovato
- Home arena: Hofheinz Pavilion

The 2008–09 Houston Cougars women's basketball team, also known as the Houston Cougars, Houston, or UH, represented the University of Houston in the college basketball 2008–09 season. It was their 65th year of season play. Their head coach was Joe Curl, in his 11th year. The team played their home games at Hofheinz Pavilion on-campus in Houston, Texas. Theyfinished the season with 19 wins. The Cougars were 12-2 at home, 6-6 on the road, and 1-2 in neutral site games.

== Schedule ==
Date time, TV	Rank^{#}	Opponent^{#}	Result	Record	Site city, state
Exhibition
2008/11/10*		Houston Jaguars	W 70-61		Hofheinz Pavilion; Houston, Texas
Regular season
2008/11/14*; 5:30PM		Southeastern Louisiana	W 73-58	1-0	Hofheinz Pavilion; Houston, Texas
2008/11/15*; 12:00PM		Gardner–Webb	W 79-58	2-0	Hofheinz Pavilion; Houston, Texas
2008/11/19*; 9:00PM		at Oregon State	L 47-69	2-1	Gill Coliseum; Corvallis, Oregon
2008/11/21*; 7:00PM		Miami (FL)	W 70-64	3-1	Hofheinz Pavilion; Houston, Texas
2008/11/25*; 7:00PM		at TCU	L 72-91	3-2	Daniel-Meyer Coliseum; Fort Worth, Texas
2008/12/02*; 7:00PM		at North Texas	W 80-66	4-2	UNT Coliseum; Denton, Texas
2008/12/05*; 7:00PM		Texas Southern	W 64-44	5-2	Hofheinz Pavilion; Houston, Texas
2008/12/14*; 2:00PM		Cal Poly	W 68-57	6-2	Hofheinz Pavilion; Houston, Texas
St. John's-Chartwells Holiday Classic
2008/12/20*; 12:00PM		vs. Boston College	L 56-62	6-3	Carnesecca Arena; Queens, New York
2008/12/21*; 12:00PM		vs. Buffalo	W 80-62	7-3	Carnesecca Arena; Queens, New York
Regular season
2008/12/28*; 2:00PM		Akron	W 74-59	8-3	Hofheinz Pavilion; Houston, Texas
2008/12/31*; 2:00PM		at Kansas	L 56-73	8-4	Allen Fieldhouse; Lawrence, Kansas
2009/01/09; 7:00PM		at Tulane	W 58-56	9-4 (1-0)	Avron B. Fogelman Arena; New Orleans, Louisiana
2009/01/11; 1:00PM, ESPN2		at UTEP	L 67-74	9-5 (1-1)	Don Haskins Center; El Paso, Texas
2009/01/16; 7:00PM		UAB	W 61-50	10-5 (2-1)	Hofheinz Pavilion; Houston, Texas
2009/01/18; 2:00PM		Memphis	W 83-65	11-5 (3-1)	Hofheinz Pavilion; Houston, Texas
2009/01/22; 7:00PM		at Southern Miss	L 65-74	11-6 (3-2)	Reed Green Coliseum; Hattiesburg, Mississippi
2009/01/25; 2:00PM, FS Houston, CBS CS		UCF	W 80-65	12-6 (4-2)	Hofheinz Pavilion; Houston, Texas
2009/01/29; 7:00PM		at SMU	L 56-59	12-7 (4-3)	Moody Coliseum; Dallas, Texas
2009/01/31; 7:00PM		at Tulsa	W 68-46	13-7 (5-3)	Reynolds Center; Tulsa, Oklahoma
2009/02/04; 7:00PM		at Rice	W 66-56	14-7 (6-3)	Tudor Fieldhouse; Houston, Texas
2009/02/07; 5:00PM		Rice	W 70-30	15-7 (7-3)	Hofheinz Pavilion; Houston, Texas
2009/02/12; 7:00PM		Tulane	W 60-53	16-7 (8-3)	Hofheinz Pavilion; Houston, Texas
2009/02/14; 12:00PM, CBS CS		UTEP	L 72-75	16-8 (8-4)	Hofheinz Pavilion; Houston, Texas
2009/02/20; 7:00PM		SMU	W 75-73	17-8 (9-4)	Hofheinz Pavilion; Houston, Texas
2009/02/22; 2:00PM		Tulsa	L 55-59	17-9 (9-5)	Hofheinz Pavilion; Houston, Texas
2009/02/26; 6:00PM		at Marshall	W 67-58	18-9 (10-5)	Cam Henderson Center; Huntington, West Virginia
2009/02/28; 1:00PM		at East Carolina	W 66-65	19-9 (11-5)	Williams Arena at Minges Coliseum; Greenville, North Carolina
*Non-conference game. ^{#}Rankings from AP Poll. (#) Tournament seedings in parentheses. All times are in Central Standard Time.

=== Conference USA tournament ===
On March 6, despite Courtney Taylor's team-high 19 points and nine rebounds, the University of Houston women's basketball team could not overcome a sluggish first half, falling to UCF 79-66 in the quarterfinals of the Conference USA Championship at Fogelman Arena.

== Awards and honors ==
- Zane Jakobsone (senior): Cougars Academic MVP
- Courtney Taylor (sophomore): Cougars Athletic MVP
