= Wade Scott =

College Basketball Coach

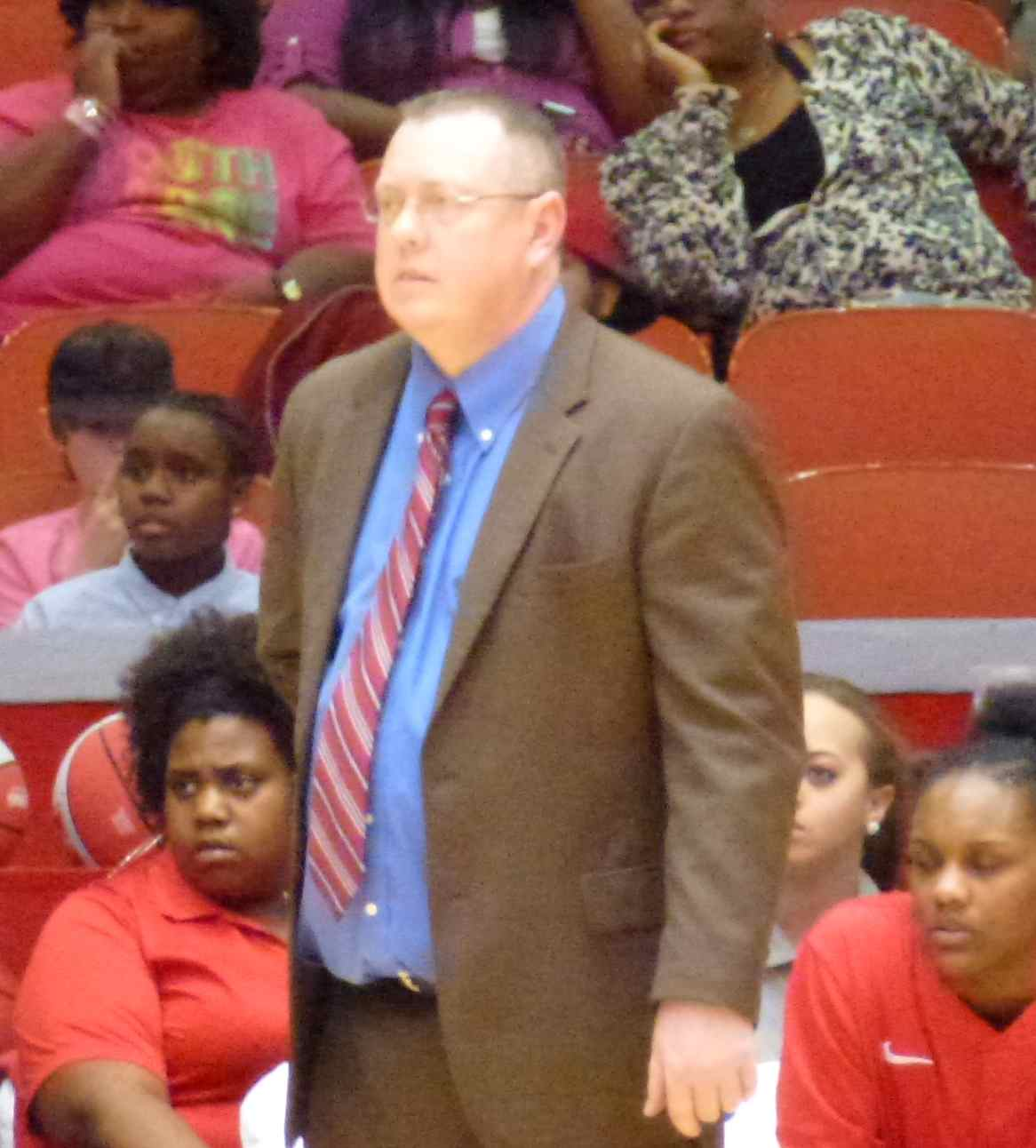
- Scott in 2014 at the University of Houston

Biographical details
- Education: Eastern New Mexico (BA); Midwestern State University (MA)

Playing career
- 1988: Texas–Arlington
- 1989: Frank Phillips College
- 1990–1992: Eastern New Mexico

Coaching career (HC unless noted)
- 1993–1994: New Mexico Military Institute (assistant)
- 1995: Yale HS (OK)
- 1995: Western Oklahoma State College (assistant)
- 1996–2001: Western Oklahoma State College
- 2002–2003: Clarendon College
- 2003–2005: Grayson County College
- 2005–2006: Trinity Valley Community College (assistant)
- 2006–2014: Houston (assistant)
- 2014: Houston
- 2014–2019: Texas A&M–Kingsville

Wade Scott is an American college basketball coach, who most recently served as the Women's Head Coach at Texas A&M University–Kingsville in Kingsville, Texas from 2014 to 2019. He was previously the interim head coach at the University of Houston after being an assistant coach for several years. He has also coached on the junior college and high school levels.

== Head coaching record ==
Record table
Season	Team	Overall	Conference	Standing	Postseason
Houston Cougars (American Athletic Conference) (2013–2014)
2013–14	Houston	2–18	1–17	10th	
Houston:		2–18 (.100)	1–17 (.056)		
Texas A&M Kingsville Javelinas (Lone Star Conference) (2014–2019)
2014–15	TAMUK	0–26	0–16	9th	
2015–16	TAMUK	5–21	0–16	9th	
2016–17	TAMUK	14–14	8–12	8th	
2017–18	TAMUK	8–20	5–15	10th	
2018–19	TAMUK	9–19	6–14	9th	
TAMUK:		36–100 (.265)	19–73 (.207)		
Total:		38–118 (.244)			
National champion Postseason invitational champion Conference regular season champion Conference regular season and conference tournament champion Division regular season champion Division regular season and conference tournament champion Conference tournament champion
