= 2013–14 SMU Mustangs women's basketball team =

Intercollegiate basketball season

2013–14 SMU Mustangs women's basketball

WNIT, Second Round
- Conference: American Athletic Conference
- Record: 18–14 (8–10 The American)
- Head coach: Rhonda Rompola (23rd season)
- Assistant coaches: Lisa Dark; Deneen Parker; Danny Hughes
- Home arena: Curtis Culwell Center (5 games); Moody Coliseum (9 games)

2013–14 American Athletic Conference women's basketball standings
	Conf.				Overall
Team	W		L	PCT	W		L	PCT
No. 1 UConn†	18	–	0	1.000	40	–	0	1.000
No. 4 Louisville	16	–	2	.889	33	–	5	.868
South Florida	13	–	5	.722	23	–	13	.639
Rutgers	12	–	6	.667	28	–	9	.757
SMU	8	–	10	.444	18	–	14	.563
Temple	8	–	10	.444	14	–	16	.467
Memphis	6	–	12	.333	13	–	18	.419
Cincinnati	5	–	13	.278	13	–	18	.419
UCF	3	–	15	.167	10	–	20	.333
Houston	1	–	17	.056	6	–	25	.194
† American Tournament winner winner As of 8 April 2014; Rankings from AP poll

The 2013–14 SMU Mustangs women's basketball team represented Southern Methodist University in the 2013–14 NCAA Division I women's basketball season. The Mustangs played their home games at Curtis Culwell Center and at Moody Coliseum. The 2013–14 season was their first season the Mustangs will participate in the American Athletic Conference. The Mustangs were coached by 23rd year head coach Rhonda Rompola. They finished the season with a record of 18–14 overall, 8–10 in the American Conference play. They lost in the quarterfinals of the 2014 American Athletic Conference women's basketball tournament to Rutgers. They were invited to the 2014 Women's National Invitation Tournament, where they defeated Texas Southern in the first round before losing to Minnesota in the second round.

== Roster ==
2013–14 SMU Mustangs women's basketball team
Players
Coaches

Pos.	#	Name	Height	Year	Previous school	Hometown
G	0	Kiara Perry	5 ft 10 in (1.78 m)	Fr	Duncanville HS	Duncanville, Texas
G	2	Kamy Cole	5 ft 9 in (1.75 m)	So	Brock HS; TCU	Brock, Texas
G	3	Gabrielle Wilkins	5 ft 9 in (1.75 m)	So	Garland HS	Garland, Texas
F	5	Akil Simpson	6 ft 0 in (1.83 m)	Sr	Duncanville HS	Duncanville, Texas
G	10	Korina Baker	5 ft 7 in (1.7 m)	Sr	Freeman HS; N. Idaho	Valleyford, Washington
G	12	Morgan Bolton	5 ft 6 in (1.68 m)	So	Duncanville HS; Arkansas–Little Rock	Duncanville, Texas
G	23	Keena Mays	5 ft 7 in (1.7 m)	Sr	Mansfield Timberview HS; Kansas	Arlington, Texas
G	25	Krystal Johnson	5 ft 5 in (1.65 m)	Sr	Naaman Forest HS	Garland, Texas
F	31	Destynee Hives-McCray	6 ft 0 in (1.83 m)	Jr	Martin HS	Arlington, Texas
G	32	Raven Short	5 ft 11 in (1.8 m)	RS Jr	Flower Mound Marcus HS	Flower Mound, Texas
F	33	Brittney Hardy	6 ft 2 in (1.88 m)	RS So	Frisco HS; Oklahoma State	Frisco, Texas
F	44	Mallory Singleton	6 ft 2 in (1.88 m)	Sr	Flower Mound HS	Flower Mound, Texas

Head coach

- Rhonda Rampola (SMU)

Assistant coach(es)

- Lisa Dark (SMU)
- Deneen Parker (Stephen F. Austin)
- Danny Hughes (TCU)

Legend

- (C) Team captain
- (S) Suspended
- (I) Ineligible
- (W) Walk-on
- Injured
- Current redshirt

Roster
Last update: 08/20/2013

== Schedule and results ==
Date time, TV	Rank^{#}	Opponent^{#}	Result	Record	Site (attendance) city, state
Non-conference regular season
11/10/2013*; 2:00 pm		Grambling State	W 87–65	1–0	Curtis Culwell Center (277); Garland, Texas
11/13/2013*; 7:00 pm		TCU	W 72–68 ^{OT}	2–0	Curtis Culwell Center (438); Garland, Texas
11/16/2013*; 3:00 pm		at Eastern Washington	W 75–70	3–0	Reese Court (604); Cheney, Washington
11/19/2013*; 7:00 pm		Mississippi Valley State	W 91–53	4–0	Curtis Culwell Center (344); Garland, Texas
11/23/2013*; 6:00 pm		Stephen F. Austin	W 81–69	5–0	William R. Johnson Coliseum (712); Nacogdoches, Texas
11/25/2013*; 6:00 pm		Lamar	W 82–79 ^{OT}	6–0	Curtis Culwell Center (345); Garland, Texas
11/28/2013*; 3:15 pm		vs. Kansas State; Junkanoo Jam	W 68–57	7–0	St. George High School Gymnasium (235); Freeport, Bahamas
11/29/2013*; 7:00 pm		vs. No. 3 Tennessee; Junkanoo Jam	L 47–87	7–1	St. George High School Gymnasium (563); Freeport, Bahamas
12/04/2013*; 7:00 pm		Southeastern Louisiana	W 82–39	8–1	Curtis Culwell Center (366); Garland, Texas
12/07/2013*; 5:30 pm		at UTEP	L 71–76	8–2	Don Haskins Center (2,387); El Paso, Texas
12/21/2013*; 12:00 pm		at North Texas	W 84–79 ^{OT}	9–2	The Super Pit (854); Denton, Texas
Conference Regular Season
12/29/2013; 2:00 pm, ESPNU		at No. 7 Louisville	L 51–71	9–3 (0–1)	KFC Yum! Center (7,677); Louisville, Kentucky
01/01/2014; 12:00 pm		at Cincinnati	W 54–43	10–3 (1–1)	Fifth Third Arena (468); Cincinnati, OH
01/04/2014; 3:30 pm, ESPN3		South Florida	L 62–76	10–4 (1–2)	Moody Coliseum (7,166); Dallas
01/07/2014; 7:00 pm, AAC Digital		Memphis	W 80–75 ^{2OT}	11–4 (2–2)	Moody Coliseum (536); Dallas
01/11/2014; 1:00 pm, AAC Digital		at Rutgers	L 54–64	11–5 (2–3)	Louis Brown Athletic Center (1,526); Piscataway, New Jersey
01/14/2014; 11:00 am, AAC Digital		at Temple	L 66–80	11–6 (2–4)	Liacouras Center (1,761); Philadelphia
01/19/2014; 12:00 pm, ESPNU		No. 5 Louisville	L 66–81	11–7 (2–5)	Moody Coliseum (1,650); Dallas
01/25/2014; 2:00 pm, AAC Digital		at Houston	W 73–60	12–7 (3–5)	Hofheinz Pavilion (723); Houston
01/28/2014; 7:00 pm		Cincinnati	W 66–47	13–7 (4–5)	Moody Coliseum (506); Dallas
02/01/2014; 3:30 pm		Temple	W 85–75	14–7 (5–5)	Moody Coliseum (7,058); Dallas
02/04/2014; 6:00 pm, SNY		at No. 1 Connecticut	L 41–102	14–8 (5–6)	Gampel Pavilion (7,839); Storrs, Connecticut
02/08/2014; 2:00 pm		Rutgers	L 64–65	14–9 (5–7)	Moody Coliseum (954); Dallas
02/11/2014; 6:00 pm, AAC Digital		at UCF	L 54–59	14–10 (5–8)	CFE Arena (382); Orlando, Florida
02/15/2014; 2:00 pm, AAC Digital		Houston	W 67–50	15–10 (6–8)	Moody Coliseum (1,032); Dallas
02/22/2014; 2:00 pm, ESPN3		at Memphis	W 78–74	16–10 (7–8)	FedEx Forum (837); Memphis, Tennessee
02/25/2014; 7:00 pm, SNY		No. 1 Connecticut	L 48–81	16–11 (7–9)	Moody Coliseum (4,091); Dallas
03/01/2014; 6:00 pm, AAC Digital		at South Florida	L 51–72	16–12 (7–10)	USF Sun Dome (1,407); Tampa, Florida
03/03/2014; 7:00 pm		UCF	W 79–67	17–12 (8–10)	Moody Coliseum (498); Dallas
2014 American Athletic Conference women's basketball tournament
03/08/2014; 11:00 am, ESPN3		vs. No. 24 Rutgers; Quarterfinals	L 49–68	17–13	Mohegan Sun Arena (N/A); Uncasville, Connecticut
2014 Women's National Invitation Tournament
03/20/2014*; 7:00 pm		Texas Southern; First Round	W 84–72	18–13	Moody Coliseum (369); Dallas
03/23/2014*; 5:00 pm		at Minnesota; Second Round	L 70–77	18–14	Williams Arena (587); Minneapolis
*Non-conference game. ^{#}Rankings from AP Poll. (#) Tournament seedings in parentheses. All times are in Central Time.

== See also ==
2013–14 SMU Mustangs men's basketball team
