= 2013–14 UCF Knights women's basketball team =

Intercollegiate basketball season

2013–14 UCF Knights women's basketball

UCF Thanksgiving Classic Champions
- Conference: American Athletic Conference
- Record: 10–20 (3–15 The American)
- Head coach: Joi Williams
- Assistant coaches: Courtney Locke; Khalilah Mitchell; Brett Fink
- Home arena: CFE Arena

2013–14 American Athletic Conference women's basketball standings
	Conf.				Overall
Team	W		L	PCT	W		L	PCT
No. 1 UConn†	18	–	0	1.000	40	–	0	1.000
No. 4 Louisville	16	–	2	.889	33	–	5	.868
South Florida	13	–	5	.722	23	–	13	.639
Rutgers	12	–	6	.667	28	–	9	.757
SMU	8	–	10	.444	18	–	14	.563
Temple	8	–	10	.444	14	–	16	.467
Memphis	6	–	12	.333	13	–	18	.419
Cincinnati	5	–	13	.278	13	–	18	.419
UCF	3	–	15	.167	10	–	20	.333
Houston	1	–	17	.056	6	–	25	.194
† American Tournament winner winner As of 8 April 2014; Rankings from AP poll

The 2013–14 UCF Knights women's basketball team represented the University of Central Florida during the 2013–14 NCAA Division I basketball season. The Knights competed in Division I of the National Collegiate Athletic Association (NCAA) and the American Athletic Conference (The American). The Knights, in the program's 37th season of basketball, were led by seventh-year head coach Joi Williams, and played their home games at the CFE Arena on the university's main campus in Orlando, Florida.

The season was UCF's first as a member of The American. UCF played in Conference USA from 2005 to 2013.

== Previous season ==
In the previous year, the Knights finished the season 16–18, 7–9 in Conference USA play.

== Roster ==
2013–14 UCF Knights women's basketball team
Players
Coaches

Pos.	#	Name	Height	Year	Previous school	Hometown
G	3	Bryeasha Blair	5 ft 4 in (1.63 m)	RS So	Whitney Young HS	Chicago, Ill.
F	20	Sara Djassi	5 ft 11 in (1.8 m)	Sr	Lisbon, Portugal
F/C	11	Yanique Gordon	6 ft 4 in (1.93 m)	Jr	Green Island HS	Hanover, Jamaica
G	2	Andrea Hines	5 ft 7 in (1.7 m)	Jr	Sanford School	New Castle, Del.
G	23	Briahanna Jackson	5 ft 4 in (1.63 m)	So	Freedom/IMG Academy	Tampa, Fla.
G	4	Jordan Jackson	5 ft 9 in (1.75 m)	Fr	St. Anthony HS	Long Beach, Calif.
F/C	55	Erika Jones	6 ft 2 in (1.88 m)	Sr	Smiths Station HS	Phenix City, Ala.
G	5	Zykira Lewis	5 ft 8 in (1.73 m)	Fr	Bartow HS	Bartow, Fla.
F	13	Brittni Montgomery	6 ft 3 in (1.91 m)	RS Jr	Fort Pierce Central	Fort Pierce, Fla.
F	21	Makenzi Reasor	6 ft 2 in (1.88 m)	RS Fr	Mount Vernon HS	Fortville, Ind
F	22	Rosinha Rosario	6 ft 1 in (1.85 m)	So	Rio De Mouro, Portugal
F	42	Stephanie Taylor	6 ft 2 in (1.88 m)	Jr	Sun Valley HS	Indian Trail, N.C.
G	1	Aneesa Watson	5 ft 11 in (1.8 m)	Fr	Fayette County HS	Fayette County, Ga.

Head coach

Joi Williams

Assistant coach(es)

Courtney Locke
Khalilah Mitchell
Brett Fink

Legend

- (C) Team captain
- (S) Suspended
- (I) Ineligible
- (W) Walk-on
- Injured
- Current redshirt

Roster
Last update: 2013-08-17

== Schedule and results ==
Date time, TV	Rank^{#}	Opponent^{#}	Result	Record	Site (attendance) city, state
Non-conference regular season
11/08/2013*; 6:00 pm		Central Connecticut	W 65–51	1–0	CFE Arena (511); Orlando, FL
11/12/2013*; 7:00 pm		at Oakland	W 57–54	2–0	Athletics Center O'rena (243); Rochester, MI
11/15/2013*; 6:00 pm		FIU	W 71–66	3–0	CFE Arena (508); Orlando, FL
11/19/2013*; 6:00 pm		at Georgia State	W 85–77	4–0	GSU Sports Arena (734); Atlanta, GA
11/23/2013*; 7:00 pm		at Charlotte	L 52–62	4–1	Dale F. Halton Arena (858); Charlotte, NC
11/30/2013*; 2:30 pm		Howard; UCF Thanksgiving Classic	W 65–45	5–1	CFE Arena (494); Orlando, FL
12/01/2013*; 2:30 pm		SIUE; UCF Thanksgiving Classic	W 68–43	6–1	CFE Arena (474); Orlando, FL
12/07/2013*; 4:00 pm		Flagler	W 84–79	7–1	CFE Arena (345); Orlando, FL
12/13/2013*; 7:00 pm		at FAU	L 69–82 ^{OT}	7–2	FAU Arena (577); Boca Raton, FL
12/16/2013*; 7:00 pm		Middle Tennessee State	L 51–63	7–3	CFE Arena (348); Orlando, FL
12/21/2013*; 1:00 pm		Iona	L 66–78	7–4	CFE Arena (980); Orlando, FL
American regular season
12/28/2013; 3:00 pm, ADN		at Houston	W 67–59	8–4 (1–0)	Hofheinz Pavilion (669); Houston, TX
01/01/2014; 4:00 pm, ESPN3		No. 1 Connecticut	L 49–77	8–5 (1–1)	CFE Arena (3,492); Orlando, FL
01/04/2014; 2:00 pm, ADN		at Temple	L 54–75	8–6 (1–2)	Liacouras Center (501); Philadelphia, PA
01/11/2014; 4:00 pm, ADN		Memphis	L 52–88	8–7 (1–3)	CFE Arena (453); Orlando, FL
01/15/2014; 7:00 pm, WHAS		at No. 5 Louisville	L 56–75	8–8 (1–4)	KFC Yum! Center (7,067); Louisville, KY
01/18/2014; 7:00 pm, ADN		South Florida; War on I-4	L 38–62	8–9 (1–5)	CFE Arena (604); Orlando, FL
01/22/2014; 7:00 pm, ADN		Rutgers	L 48–69	8–10 (1–6)	CFE Arena (603); Orlando, FL
01/25/2014; 2:00 pm		at Cincinnati	L 37–47	8–11 (1–7)	Fifth Third Arena (736); Cincinnati, OH
01/29/2014; 1:00 pm		at Memphis	L 53–62	8–12 (1–8)	FedExForum (1,164); Memphis, TN
02/01/2014; 4:00 pm		Houston	W 52–43	9–12 (2–8)	CFE Arena (696); Orlando, FL
02/04/2014; 7:00 pm, ESPN3		No. 4 Louisville	L 59–74	9–13 (2–9)	CFE Arena (708); Orlando, FL
02/08/2014; 2:00 pm, ESPN3		at South Florida; War on I-4	L 54–89	9–14 (2–10)	USF Sun Dome (1,475); Tampa, FL
02/11/2014; 7:00 pm, ADN		SMU	W 59–54	10–14 (3–10)	CFE Arena (382); Orlando, FL
02/15/2014; 2:00 pm		at Rutgers	L 50–90	10–15 (3–11)	Louis Brown Athletic Center (2,683); Piscataway, NJ
02/19/2014; 7:00 pm, ESPN3		at No. 1 Connecticut	L 35–83	10–16 (3–12)	Harry A. Gampel Pavilion (9,815); Hartford, CT
02/22/2014; 4:00 pm, ADN		Cincinnati	L 49–50	10–17 (3–13)	CFE Arena (472); Orlando, FL
03/01/2014; 4:00 pm		Temple	L 54–64	10–18 (3–14)	CFE Arena; Orlando, FL
03/03/2014; 8:00 pm		at SMU	L 67–79	10–19 (3–15)	Moody Coliseum; Dallas, TX
2014 American Athletic Conference women's basketball tournament
03/07/2014; 6:00 pm, ESPN3		vs. Cincinnati	L 52–54	10–20	Mohegan Sun Arena; Uncasville, CT
*Non-conference game. ^{#}Rankings from AP Poll. (#) Tournament seedings in parentheses. All times are in Eastern Time.

== See also ==
- 2013–14 UCF Knights men's basketball team
