= Todd Buchanan =

American basketball coach

Current position
- Title: Associate Head Coach
- Team: Western Kentucky
- Conference: Conference USA

Biographical details
- Born: March 1, 1967 (age 59)
- Education: Murray State ('95)

Coaching career (HC unless noted)
- 1992–1995: Murray State (Asst.)
- 1995–1996: Oral Roberts (Asst.)
- 1996–1998: Montevallo
- 1998–2000: East Carolina (Asst.)
- 2000–2005: Houston (Assoc. HC)
- 2005–2010: Houston Baptist
- 2010–2013: Houston
- 2015-2018: Allen CC
- 2018–2019: Arkansas State (Asst.)
- 2019–2023: UTEP (Assoc. HC)
- 2023–present: Western Kentucky (Assoc. HC)

Head coaching record
- Overall: 145–160

Accomplishments and honors

Championships
- C-USA Regular Season Championships (2011)

Awards
- C-USA Coach of the Year (2011)

Todd Buchanan (born March 1, 1967) is an American college basketball coach and former head coach at the University of Houston and Houston Christian University.

== Career ==
He was the sixth head coach of the Houston Cougars, and officially began in that position on April 20, 2010, resigning on December 21, 2013. Prior to his appointment with Houston, he served as the head coach of Houston Baptist, where he transitioned the team from the NAIA to Division I of the NCAA. In his first season as head coach at Houston, Buchanan achieved the second best season record in the program's history, and the best ever as a first year coach for the program.

From 2000 through 2005, Buchanan served as an associate head coach for Houston under coach Joe Curl.

He is a graduate of Murray State University where he was a member of Alpha Gamma Rho fraternity.

== Head coaching record ==
Record table
Season	Team	Overall	Conference	Standing	Postseason
Montevallo Falcons (Gulf South) (1996–1998)
1996–97	Montevallo	12–17	5–10		
1997–98	Montevallo	7–19	3–12		
Montevallo:		19–36	8–22		
Houston Baptist Huskies (RRAC) (2005–2007)
2005–06	Houston Baptist	28–4	20–0	1st	NAIA Sweet Sixteen
2006–07	Houston Baptist	27–7	15–3	2nd	NAIA Elite Eight
Houston Baptist Huskies (Independent) (2007–2008)
2007–08	Houston Baptist	14–11	—	—	
Houston Baptist Huskies (Great West) (2008–2010)
2008–09	Houston Baptist	8–21	—	—	
2009–10	Houston Baptist	3–25	1–11	7th	
Houston Baptist:		80–68	36–14		
Houston Cougars (C-USA) (2010–2013)
2010–11	Houston	26–6	16–0	1st	NCAA First round
2011–12	Houston	3–26	2–14	12th	
2012–13	Houston	13–17	7–9	9th	
Houston Cougars (The American) (2013–2013)
2013–14	Houston	4–7	—		
Houston:		46–56	25–23		
Total:		145–160			
National champion Postseason invitational champion Conference regular season champion Conference regular season and conference tournament champion Division regular season champion Division regular season and conference tournament champion Conference tournament champion
