= Joi Williams =

American basketball coach (born 1966)

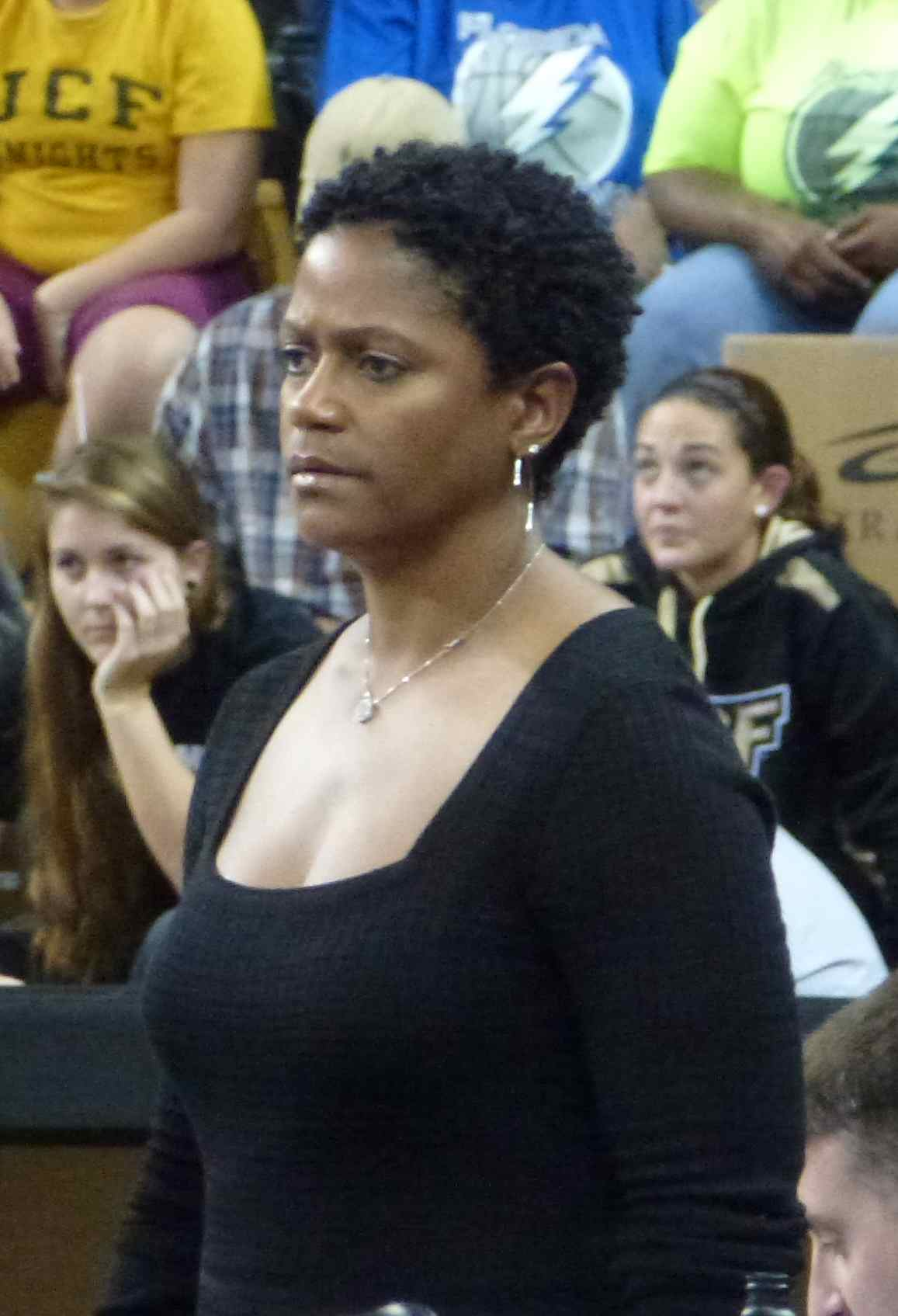

Current position
- Title: Assistant coach
- Team: San Antonio Stars

Biographical details
- Born: November 5, 1966 (age 59); Jacksonville, Florida, U.S.

Playing career
- 1984–1988: South Florida
- Position: Point guard

Coaching career (HC unless noted)
- 1989–2001: Florida (asst.)
- 2001–2003: Clemson (asst.)
- 2003–2007: Murray State
- 2007–2016: UCF
- 2017: San Antonio Stars (asst.)

Head coaching record
- Overall: 168–224 (.429)

Accomplishments and honors

Championships
- 2× Conference USA Tournament champions (2009, 2011)
Medal record
Women's basketball
Assistant Coach for United States
FIBA Under-19 World Championship
Gold medal – first place	2011 Puerto Montt	Team competition
Assistant Coach for United States
FIBA Americas Under-18 Championship
Gold medal – first place	2010 Colorado Springs	Team competition

Joi Williams (born November 5, 1966) is the former head coach of the UCF Knights women's basketball team.

== Career ==
Williams arrived at UCF in 2007 and during her tenure, she has taken the Knights to two C-USA championships. As of March 7, 2016, Williams and the school agreed to part ways. On March 14, 2017, Williams was announced as a new assistant coach for the WNBA's San Antonio Stars.

== Personal life ==
In August 2004, she married Herman Felton Jr.

== Head coaching record ==
Record table
Season	Team	Overall	Conference	Standing	Postseason
Murray State (Ohio Valley Conference) (2003–2007)
2003–04	Murray State	13–15	9–7	t5th	
2004–05	Murray State	9–19	5–11	8th	
2005–06	Murray State	11–17	9–11	t6th	
2006–07	Murray State	21–10	15–5	2nd	
Murray State:		54–61 (.470)	38–34 (.528)		
UCF (Conference USA) (2007–2013)
2007–08	UCF	10–20	3–13	12th	
2008–09	UCF	17–17	11–5	t2nd	NCAA First Round
2009–10	UCF	11–16	7–9	t7th	
2010–11	UCF	22–11	12–4	2nd	NCAA First Round
2011–12	UCF	12–17	7–9	t7th	
2012–13	UCF	16–18	7–9	t8th	
UCF (American Athletic Conference) (2013–2016)
2013–14	UCF	10–20	3–15	9th	
2014–15	UCF	9–21	5–13	8th	
2015–16	UCF	7–23	4–14	t9th	
UCF:		114–163 (.412)	59–91 (.393)		
Total:		168–224(.429)			
National champion Postseason invitational champion Conference regular season champion Conference regular season and conference tournament champion Division regular season champion Division regular season and conference tournament champion Conference tournament champion
