= Chandi Jones =

American basketball player (born 1982)

Personal information
- Born: March 25, 1982 (age 44) Wharton, Texas, U.S.
- Listed height: 5 ft 9 in (1.75 m)
- Listed weight: 150 lb (68 kg)

Career information
- High school: Bay City (Bay City, Texas)
- College: Houston (2000–2004)
- WNBA draft: 2004: 1st round, 8th overall pick
- Drafted by: Phoenix Mercury
- Playing career: 2004–2006
- Position: Shooting guard

Career history
- 2004–2005: Detroit Shock
- 2005–2006: Minnesota Lynx

Career highlights
- Kodak All-American (2004); All-American – USBWA (2004); Second-team All-American – AP (2004); 3× CUSA Player of the Year (2002–2004); CUSA Tournament MVP (2004); CUSA Freshman of the Year (2001); CUSA All-Freshman Team (2001); 4× First-team All-CUSA (2001–2004); NCAA season scoring leader (2003)
- Stats at Basketball Reference
Medals
Women's basketball
Representing United States
FIBA Under-18 Americas Championship
Gold medal – first place	2000 Argentina	Team

Chandi Jones (born March 25, 1982) is an American professional basketball player. Jones is the daughter of Janice and David Jones, a former professional football player who later became a collegiate basketball coach.

== High school ==
Born in Wharton, Texas, Jones was a basketball and long jump standout at Bay City High School in Bay City, Texas. Jones was named a WBCA All-American. She participated in the 2000 WBCA High School All-America Game, where she scored four points.

== College ==
Jones attended college at University of Houston, where she helped bring the women's basketball program to national prominence. During her freshman season, Jones tore an anterior cruciate ligament, and missed the final eleven games of the season. Even with the injury, she was awarded the Conference USA Freshman of the Year honor and was also named to the All-Conference first team. As a leader of the Lady Cougars, Jones helped the team advance to the finals of the 2002 Women's National Invitation Tournament, and to its first NCAA tournament berth in twelve years in 2004. She was named the Conference USA Player of the Year three times, and was subsequently named Conference USA women's basketball Player of the Decade. In 2005, Jones had her number (13) retired by the University of Houston, from which she graduated in 2004. She is currently the all-time leading scorer in school and conference history.

== Houston statistics ==
Legend
GP	Games played	GS	Games started	MPG	Minutes per game	FG%	Field goal percentage	3P%	3-point field goal percentage
FT%	Free throw percentage	RPG	Rebounds per game	APG	Assists per game	SPG	Steals per game	BPG	Blocks per game
TO	Turnovers per game	PPG	Points per game	**Bold**	Career high	*	Led Division I

Year	Team	GP	Points	FG%	3P%	FT%	RPG	APG	SPG	BPG	PPG
2000–01	Houston	20	429	45.1	25.4	71.7	5.7	2.5	2.3	0.5	21.5
2001–02	Houston	**34**	766	45.9	33.1	68.8	5.8	**2.7**	2.7	0.3	22.5
2002–03	Houston	28	**770**	**48.8**	**36.9**	72.1	**8.2**	2.4	**3.4**	**0.8**	***27.5**
2003–04	Houston	32	727	42.0	36.6	**73.7**	5.5	2.4	3.1	0.7	22.7
Career	Houston	114	2692	45.4	34.3	71.4	6.3	2.5	2.9	0.6	23.6

== USA Basketball ==
Jones was a member of the USA Women's U18 team which won the gold medal at the FIBA Americas Championship in Mar Del Plata, Argentina. The event was held in July 2000, when the USA team defeated Cuba to win the championship. Jones averaged 4.0 points per game.

== Professional ==
Following her collegiate career, Jones was selected by the Phoenix Mercury 8th overall in the 2004 WNBA draft before being traded to the Detroit Shock for Shereka Wright, Erika Valek and Sheila Lambert on draft day. On July 30, 2005, Jones was dealt to the Lynx along with Stacey Thomas and a draft pick for Katie Smith.

After averaging 5.0 points per game in her first two seasons, ankle and knee injuries limited Jones to just six games in 2006. She averaged just 2.8 points and 6.3 minutes in those contests. On May 18, 2007, Jones was released by the Lynx.

Jones played during the 2003-4 European women's basketball season for Maccabi Raanana in Israel, and during the 2006–7 season for a club in Budapest, Hungary. In 2007–8, Jones signed with Israeli club Hapoel Tel Aviv, but was cut from the team after its first game of the season.

== WNBA career statistics ==
Legend
GP	Games played	GS	Games started	MPG	Minutes per game	RPG	Rebounds per game
APG	Assists per game	SPG	Steals per game	BPG	Blocks per game	PPG	Points per game
TO	Turnovers per game	FG%	Field-goal percentage	3P%	3-point field-goal percentage	FT%	Free-throw percentage
**Bold**	Career best	°	League leader

=== Regular season ===
Year	Team	GP	GS	MPG	FG%	3P%	FT%	RPG	APG	SPG	BPG	TO	PPG
2004	Detroit	**31**	8	12.8	.359	.250	.806	1.1	1.5	0.6	0.2	1.3	3.5
2005	Detroit	21	0	15.7	.407	.486	.789	1.5	1.1	0.6	0.1	1.1	6.0
2005	Minnesota	10	**9**	**28.1**	.349	.344	.632	**3.3**	**3.0**	**1.3**	**0.3**	1.7	**8.1**
2006	Minnesota	6	0	6.3	**.556**	**.750**	**1.000**	0.8	0.5	0.2	0.0	0.3	2.8
Career	3 years, 2 teams	68	17	15.4	.380	.381	.767	1.5	1.5	0.7	0.1	1.2	4.9

=== Playoffs ===
Year	Team	GP	GS	MPG	FG%	3P%	FT%	RPG	APG	SPG	BPG	TO	PPG
2004	Detroit	2	0	5.0	.250	.000	.000	0.0	0.5	0.0	0.0	0.5	1.0
Career	1 year, 1 team	2	0	5.0	.250	.000	.000	0.0	0.5	0.0	0.0	0.5	1.0
