= 2013–14 Louisville Cardinals women's basketball team =

American sports team's season

2013–14 Louisville Cardinals women's basketball

Preseason WNIT champions

NCAA tournament, Elite Eight
- Conference: American Athletic Conference

Ranking
- Coaches: No. 5
- AP: No. 3
- Record: 33–5 (16–2 The American)
- Head coach: Jeff Walz (7th season)
- Assistant coaches: Stephanie Norman; Sam Purcell; Samantha Williams
- Home arena: KFC Yum! Center

2013–14 American Athletic Conference women's basketball standings
	Conf.				Overall
Team	W		L	PCT	W		L	PCT
No. 1 UConn†	18	–	0	1.000	40	–	0	1.000
No. 4 Louisville	16	–	2	.889	33	–	5	.868
South Florida	13	–	5	.722	23	–	13	.639
Rutgers	12	–	6	.667	28	–	9	.757
SMU	8	–	10	.444	18	–	14	.563
Temple	8	–	10	.444	14	–	16	.467
Memphis	6	–	12	.333	13	–	18	.419
Cincinnati	5	–	13	.278	13	–	18	.419
UCF	3	–	15	.167	10	–	20	.333
Houston	1	–	17	.056	6	–	25	.194
† American Tournament winner winner As of 8 April 2014; Rankings from AP poll

The 2013–14 Louisville Cardinals women's basketball team represented the University of Louisville during the 2013–14 NCAA Division I women's basketball season. The Cardinals, led by seventh-year head coach Jeff Walz, played their home games at the KFC Yum! Center and were in their first and only year in the American Athletic Conference. The school joined the Atlantic Coast Conference in July 2014.

== Roster ==
2013–14 Louisville Cardinals women's basketball team
Players
Coaches

Pos.	#	Name	Height	Year	Previous school	Hometown
F	00	Sara Hammond	6 ft 2 in (1.88 m)	Jr	Rockcastle County	Mount Vernon, Kentucky
G	2	Monny Niamke	5 ft 5 in (1.65 m)	RS So	Lindsey Wilson	Rouen, France
C	3	Sheronne Vails	6 ft 4 in (1.93 m)	Sr	Arundel	Odenton, Maryland
G	4	Antonita Slaughter	6 ft 1 in (1.85 m)	Sr	Christian Academy	Louisville, Kentucky
G	10	Starr Breedlove	5 ft 6 in (1.68 m)	So	DePaul Catholic; Trinity Valley CC	Teaneck, New Jersey
F	12	Shawnta' Dyer	6 ft 1 in (1.85 m)	RS Jr	Marion Harding	Marion, Ohio
F	13	Cortnee Walton	6 ft 3 in (1.91 m)	So	St. Mary's	Surprise, Arizona
C	15	Megan Deines	6 ft 1 in (1.85 m)	So	Glendale	Springfield, Missouri
G	21	Bria Smith	5 ft 10 in (1.78 m)	Jr	Christ the King	Massapequa, New York
G	22	Jude Schimmel	5 ft 6 in (1.68 m)	Jr	Franklin (Portland, OR)	Mission, Oregon
G	23	Shoni Schimmel	5 ft 9 in (1.75 m)	Sr	Franklin (Portland, OR)	Mission, Oregon
G	25	Tia Gibbs	5 ft 9 in (1.75 m)	RS Sr	Butler; Vanderbilt	Louisville, Kentucky
F	31	Asia Taylor	6 ft 1 in (1.85 m)	RS Sr	Whetstone	Columbus, Ohio
F	32	Emmonnie Henderson	6 ft 1 in (1.85 m)	Fr	Edwardsville	Edwardsville, Illinois

Head coach

- Jeff Walz (Northern Kentucky)

Assistant coach(es)

- Stephanie Norman (Arizona State)
- Sam Purcell (Auburn)
- Samantha Williams (Auburn)

Legend

- (C) Team captain
- (S) Suspended
- (I) Ineligible
- (W) Walk-on
- Injured
- Current redshirt

Roster
Last update: 2013-12-31

== Schedule ==
Date time, TV	Rank^{#}	Opponent^{#}	Result	Record	Site (attendance) city, state
Exhibition
11/05/2013*; 11:00 am	No. 5	Pikeville	W 127–40	–	KFC Yum! Center (N/A); Louisville, KY
Regular Season
11/09/2013*; 7:00 pm	No. 5	Loyola–Chicago; Preseason WNIT First Round	W 101–54	1–0	KFC Yum! Center (7,511); Louisville, KY
11/11/2013*; 7:00 pm	No. 5	Quinnipiac; Preseason WNIT Quarterfinals	W 100–82	2–0	KFC Yum! Center (6,783); Louisville, KY
11/14/2013*; 7:00 pm	No. 5	No. 14 LSU; Preseason WNIT semifinals	W 88–67	3–0	KFC Yum! Center (8,099); Louisville, KY
11/17/2013*; 4:00 pm, CBSSN	No. 5	at No. 11 Oklahoma; Preseason WNIT championship game	W 97–92 ^{OT}	4–0	Lloyd Noble Center (7,358); Norman, OK
11/21/2013*; 7:00 pm	No. 4	Ohio	W 90–33	5–0	KFC Yum! Center (7,011); Louisville, KY
11/24/2013*; 2:00 pm	No. 4	Florida State	W 69–59 ^{OT}	6–0	KFC Yum! Center (10,045); Louisville, KY
11/27/2013*; 8:00 pm, ESPN3	No. 4	at WKU	W 74–61	7–0	E. A. Diddle Arena (3,725); Bowling Green, KY
12/01/2013*; 1:00 pm, FSSO	No. 4	at No. 7 Kentucky; The Battle For The Bluegrass	L 69–74	7–1	Memorial Coliseum (7,963); Lexington, KY
12/03/2013*; 7:00 pm	No. 7	Missouri State	W 91–49	8–1	KFC Yum! Center (6,833); Louisville, KY
12/07/2013*; 7:00 pm	No. 7	Wright State	W 99–40	9–1	KFC Yum! Center (7,163); Louisville, KY
12/14/2013*; 7:00 pm	No. 7	Austin Peay	W 108–53	10–1	KFC Yum! Center (7,534); Louisville, KY
12/17/2013*; 7:00 pm	No. 7	at Ball State	W 105–67	11–1	John E. Worthen Arena (1,104); Muncie, IN
12/21/2013*; 1:00 pm, WHAS	No. 7	No. 11 Colorado	W 69–62	12–1	KFC Yum! Center (9,812); Louisville, KY
12/29/2013; 3:00 pm, ESPNU	No. 7	SMU	W 71–51	13–1 (1–0)	KFC Yum! Center (7,677); Louisville, KY
01/01/2014; 4:00 pm, ESPN3	No. 7	at Temple	W 77–68	14–1 (2–0)	McGonigle Hall (906); Philadelphia, PA
01/04/2014; 2:00 pm, WHAS	No. 7	Cincinnati	W 64–45	15–1 (3–0)	KFC Yum! Center (8,370); Louisville, KY
01/12/2014; 3:00 pm, ESPNU	No. 7	at South Florida	W 62–54	16–1 (4–0)	USF Sun Dome (2,379); Tampa, FL
01/15/2014; 3:00 pm, WHAS	No. 5	Central Florida	W 75–56	17–1 (5–0)	KFC Yum! Center (7,067); Louisville, KY
01/19/2014; 1:30 pm, ESPNU	No. 5	at SMU	W 81–66	18–1 (6–0)	Moody Coliseum (1,650); Dallas, TX
01/21/2014; 8:00 pm, ESPN3	No. 5	at Houston	W 93–52	19–1 (7–0)	Hofheinz Pavilion (1,025); Houston, TX
01/26/2014; 1:00 pm, ESPNU	No. 5	Memphis	W 88–61	20–1 (8–0)	KFC Yum! Center (10,345); Louisville, KY
01/28/2014; 9:00 pm, CBSSN	No. 5	at Rutgers	W 80–71	21–1 (9–0)	The RAC (1,733); Piscataway, NJ
02/02/2014; 2:00 pm, CBSSN	No. 5	South Florida	W 79–59	22–1 (10–0)	KFC Yum! Center (8,280); Louisville, KY
02/04/2014; 7:00 pm, ESPN3	No. 4	at Central Florida	W 74–59	23–1 (11–0)	CFE Arena (708); Orlando, FL
02/09/2014; 1:00 pm, ESPN	No. 4	at No. 1 Connecticut	L 64–81	23–2 (11–1)	Harry A. Gampel Pavilion (10,167); Storrs, CT
02/12/2014; 7:00 pm, ESPN3	No. 4	Temple	W 60–50	24–2 (12–1)	KFC Yum! Center (7,858); Louisville, KY
02/16/2014; 1:00 pm, ESPNU	No. 4	at Memphis	W 82–66	25–2 (13–1)	Elma Roane Fieldhouse (2,585); Memphis, TN
02/19/2014; 7:00 pm, WHAS	No. 3	Houston	W 81–62	26–2 (14–1)	KFC Yum! Center (7,408); Louisville, KY
02/23/2014; 3:00 pm, ESPNU	No. 3	Rutgers	W 73–58	27–2 (15–1)	KFC Yum! Center (14,327); Louisville, KY
03/01/2014; 2:00 pm, ESPN3	No. 3	at Cincinnati	W 75–51	28–2 (16–1)	Fifth Third Arena (1,008); Cincinnati, OH
03/03/2014; 7:00 pm, ESPN2	No. 3	No. 1 Connecticut; Senior Night & Native American Appreciation Night	L 48–68	28–3 (16–2)	KFC Yum! Center (22,163); Louisville, KY
American Athletic Conference Women's Tournament
03/08/2014; 6:00 pm, ESPN3	No. 3	vs. Houston; Quarterfinals	W 88–43	29–3	Mohegan Sun Arena (N/A); Uncasville, CT
03/09/2014; 3:00 pm, ESPNU	No. 3	vs. South Florida; Semifinals	W 60–56	30–3	Mohegan Sun Arena (7,635); Uncasville, CT
03/10/2014; 7:00 pm, ESPN	No. 3	vs. No. 1 Connecticut; Championship Game	L 52–72	30–4	Mohegan Sun Arena (8,034); Uncasville, CT
NCAA Women's Tournament
03/16/2014*; 5:30 pm, ESPN	No. 4	vs. Idaho; First Round	W 88–42	31–4	Carver-Hawkeye Arena (N/A); Iowa City, IA
03/18/2014*; 9:30 pm, ESPN2	No. 4	at No. 19 Iowa; Second Round	W 83–53	32–4	Carver-Hawkeye Arena (4,320); Iowa City, IA
03/30/2014*; 2:30 pm, ESPN	No. 4	LSU; Sweet Sixteen	W 73–47	33–4	KFC Yum! Center (11,097); Louisville, KY
04/01/2014*; 7:00 pm, ESPN	No. 4	No. 11 Maryland; Elite Eight	L 73–76	33–5	KFC Yum! Center (N/A); Louisville, KY
*Non-conference game. ^{#}Rankings from AP Poll. (#) Tournament seedings in parentheses. All times are in Eastern Time. Source:

== See also ==
2013–14 Louisville Cardinals men's basketball team
