= 2013–14 UConn Huskies women's basketball team =

Intercollegiate basketball season

2013–14 UConn Huskies women's basketball

NCAA tournament national champions AAC tournament champions AAC regular season champions Hall of Fame Classic champions
- Conference: American Athletic Conference

Ranking
- Coaches: No. 1
- AP: No. 1
- Record: 40–0 (18–0 The American)
- Head coach: Geno Auriemma (29th season)
- Assistant coaches: Chris Dailey; Shea Ralph; Marisa Moseley
- Home arena: Harry A. Gampel Pavilion

2013–14 American Athletic Conference women's basketball standings
| | Conf. | | | | Overall |
| Team | W | | L | PCT | W | | L | PCT |
|---|---|---|---|---|---|---|---|---|
| No. 1 UConn† | 18 | – | 0 | 1.000 | 40 | – | 0 | 1.000 |
| No. 4 Louisville | 16 | – | 2 | .889 | 33 | – | 5 | .868 |
| South Florida | 13 | – | 5 | .722 | 23 | – | 13 | .639 |
| Rutgers | 12 | – | 6 | .667 | 28 | – | 9 | .757 |
| SMU | 8 | – | 10 | .444 | 18 | – | 14 | .563 |
| Temple | 8 | – | 10 | .444 | 14 | – | 16 | .467 |
| Memphis | 6 | – | 12 | .333 | 13 | – | 18 | .419 |
| Cincinnati | 5 | – | 13 | .278 | 13 | – | 18 | .419 |
| UCF | 3 | – | 15 | .167 | 10 | – | 20 | .333 |
| Houston | 1 | – | 17 | .056 | 6 | – | 25 | .194 |
† American Tournament winner winner As of 8 April 2014; Rankings from AP poll

The 2013–14 UConn Huskies women's basketball team represented the University of Connecticut (UConn) in the 2013–14 NCAA Division I basketball season. The Huskies were led by 29th-year head coach Geno Auriemma and played their home games at three different venues: the XL Center in Hartford, Connecticut, on campus at the Harry A. Gampel Pavilion in Storrs, Connecticut and a game at the Webster Bank Arena in Bridgeport, Connecticut. This was UConn's first season as a member of the American Athletic Conference, known as The American. The Huskies finished the season with a perfect 40–0, 18–0 in the American Conference in winning both the regular season and the tournament titles. They received an automatic bid to the 2014 NCAA Division I women's basketball tournament and won their ninth National Championship by defeating Notre Dame. The previous day, Connecticut also won the men's tournament. It was just the second time in NCAA history the same school had won both the men's and women's tournaments; UConn first accomplished that feat in 2004.

== Off-season ==
=== USA basketball ===
Connecticut basketball players were active in USA basketball events during 2013.

Two UConn players were selected for the World University Games team:

- Bria Hartley
- Kaleena Mosqueda-Lewis

The USA team was undefeated at the event in Kazan, Russia in July. Both UConn players started all six games. Hartley was the leading scorer for the USA team with 13.5 points per game, while Mosqueda-Lewis was a close second with 13.0 points per game. Mosqueda-Lewis was the leading rebounder for the team with 41 for an average of almost seven per game.

In the gold medal game against the host, Russia, Hartley was the leading scorer with 17 points on 6-for-7 shooting from the field. Mosqueda-Lewis scored 15 points.

Three UConn players were selected to be on the USA U19 (Under-19) team:

- Moriah Jefferson
- Breanna Stewart
- Morgan Tuck

Tuck was selected to be the team captain.

The team traveled to the Canary Islands to take part in a preliminary event, the Lanzarote International Invitational Title, which included other teams also headed to the U19 world championship. In the opening game against Australia, the Aussies held a lead at halftime, which was extended to seven points in the second half, until Morgan Tuck helped lead a comeback, resulting in a close win. The team then defeated the host team, Spain, to win the Lanzarote International Invitational title.

Following the preliminary event, the team traveled to Klaipėda and Panevėžys, Lithuania for the World Championship. All three UConn players were starters in every game, except one game missed by Jefferson due to injury. The USA team won their first five games easily, then had a close, six point victory over France. In the medal rounds, the USA team beat Japan easily in the quarterfinals, then faced Australia, the team that had played them close in the Canary islands. The game started out quite close, with Australia leading on some occasions, and held a three-point lead with six minutes to go in the first half. Stewart then scored nine consecutive points to start a 21–0 run to take over the game. The USA team won, to advance to the gold medal game against France, the team they had played earlier in a close game. The first half was close, with the USA holding a seven-point lead at halftime, but the second half was all USA, who held France to only eight more points. The USA won the gold medal by a score of 61–28.

Stewart set a U19 scoring record with 152 points, surpassing the record previously held by Maya Moore. Stewart was also honored as the MVP of the tournament.

=== Roster changes ===
Three seniors departed from the prior team:

- Kelly Faris
- Caroline Doty
- Heather Buck

Faris was selected 11th overall in the 2013 WNBA draft by the Connecticut Sun.

The team added a single freshman:

- Saniya Chong

Chong is a 5' 9" guard who averaged over 30 points per game with two games over 55 points. She also had almost ten assists and five steals per game as a junior at Ossining High School in New York. In her senior season, she scored 928 points, setting a single season record for scoring in the state of New York. She helped lead her high school team to the state championship in 2013, the first ever in the history of the high school. In a regular season game, Ossining faced Hamilton, who were 12–0 at the time. Hamilton led late in the game, but Chong scored 24 points in the fourth quarter to lead her team to an 88–79 victory. That performance earned her a spot as the Sports Illustrated national Player of the Week.

Chong was recognized by Parade magazine as their national Girls Basketball Player of the Year. She was also honored by the National High School Coaches Association as the girls basketball National Player of the Year.

UConn added two walk-ons to the roster. Briana Pulido is a sophomore from Florida who was on the track and field team, but will drop that sport to concentrate on basketball. She will join the team as a 5' 7" guard. Tierney Lawlor is a freshman from Ansonia High school, who will also play as a guard. Lawlor was captain of her high school team as a junior and senior.

== Game results ==
=== Pre-season ===
Connecticut opened the season against NCAA Division II Gannon University. The Gannon Golden Knights were ranked second in the nation in the Division II pre-season poll. The Huskies had little difficulty, led by Stewart's 21 points, to help win the game 101–35. The second exhibition game was against Division II Philadelphia University. The Lady Rams were over-matched, and UConn won the game 93–28. Philadelphia held an early lead at 3–2, but did not score again for eleven minutes. Every UConn player had double-digit minutes.

=== Regular season ===
==== 2013 ====
Connecticut opened the regular season against the Hartford Hawks. The Hawks are coached by Jennifer Rizzotti who played for UConn under Auriemma. This game marked the 39th game between an Auriemma coached team and a team whose coach or assistant coach had previously played for him or served as an assistant coach. The teams coached by Auriemma have won all 39 games. This game was no exception, with UConn prevailing 89–34.

The game between UConn and Stanford matched up the #1 and #3 ranked teams in the nation. The game result, though was overshadowed by an injury to Mosqueda-Lewis, who fell hard to the floor, landing on her right arm, and filled the arena with her cries. She left the game. A report a few days later indicated she would be out three to five weeks. Stokes player more minutes than she might have otherwise, and ended with a double-double (ten points and twelve rebounds). The game was played at Gampel Pavilion, the first match-up between UConn and Stanford at the on-campus location since 1993. UConn won the game, 75–57.

UConn traveled to Maryland below full strength. In addition the Mosqueda-Lewis, who was injured in the prior game and out indefinitely, Tuck underwent knee surgery which was expected to keep her out for four to six weeks. Early ant he game, the score was tied at seven apiece, with UConn's Stewart scoring seven and Maryland's Alyssa Thomas scoring seven. UConn held a five-point lead at intermission, which Maryland quickly countered in the beginning of the second half, tying the game at 43 points each. However, UConn then scored the next eight points. Thomas scored to stop the run and Dolson picked up a fourth foul but UConn went on a 9–2 run to take a commanding lead. Thomas scored 20 points for Maryland, but Stewart had 26, which helped UConn win 72–55, in front of 15,327 fans in the arena.

Hartley entered the game against Penn State in a shooting slump from beyond the three-point line, having missed eleven consecutive attempts in her prior game. She did not shake it off in the beginning of the Penn State game, missing two shots having making one. She went over to teammate Mosqueda-Lewis, sitting on the bench with an injury, but a player who led the nation in three points shooting the prior year. She decided to rub hands with Mosqueda-Lewis for luck, and promptly hit her next three consecutive three-point attempts. Penn State hung with UConn early, but UConn broke a ten-all tie starting with a three-pointer by Chong which began a twelve-point run by the Huskies. Although Penn State would cut a 23-point lead down to nine points at one time, helped by 18 points from Penn State's Maggie Lucas, Hartley responded with eight consecutive points of her own to rebuild the lead. UConn won their third consecutive game over a ranked opponent by a score of 71–52.

UConn's next game was against Oregon, a team averaging just under 110 points per game. Oregon is coached by Paul Westhead, who has coached NBA, WNBA and NCAA men's teams. A team would score over 110 points, but it was the Huskies, who won 114–68. Late in the game, the UConn staff realized that Stefanie Dolson was close to a triple-double, so she returned to the floor, and earned an assist to complete the accomplishment. She ended the game with 26 points, 14 rebounds and 11 assists, only the second UConn Husky to complete the feat in UConn women's basketball history. Laura Lishness had the prior triple-double in 1989 against Providence college, with 14 points, 10 rebounds and 12 assists.

UConn served as a host school for the inaugural Basketball Hall of Fame Women's Challenge. The event included eight teams, four of whom played November 22–24 at UConn locations, and four of whom played the same dates at Ohio State University. All eight teams then played on December 1 at the MassMutual Center in Springfield, Massachusetts, United States, located near the Naismith Memorial Basketball Hall of Fame. UConn opened the event against BU, held at Gampel Pavilion. The game started out ragged, with BU leading for almost the first four minutes, and UConn not breaking into double digits until after six minutes had been played. Then UConn went on a 21–0 run against the Terriers to open up a large lead. Dolson had 23 points, which, coupled with her 20-point production in the prior game represented the first time she has scored 20 or more in back-to-back games.UConn went on to win 96–38. UConn faced Monmouth University in the second game, also held at Gampel Pavilion. The score was tied at seven points each early, but UConn then went on a 34–6 run, which included a stretch of 21 consecutive points scored by the Huskies, to put the game out of reach. UConn went on to win 100–46.

UConn played for the third time in three days and the fourth times in five days against St. Bonadventure, to end the first phase of the Hall of Fame Classic. This game was played at the XL Center in Hartford. Kiah Stokes led the term in scoring for the first time in her career, putting up a career-high 19 points, along with eight rebounds and four blocked shots. She helped the Huskies win the game 88–39.

After a week off, UConn played Ohio State in the final game of the Hall of Fame Classic. All eight teams in the Classic participated in a dinner, held at the Hall of Fame the day before all teams participated in the final game of the event on Sunday December 1. The team shows signs of the layoff, committing 16 turnovers, including eight be Dolson. Hartley led the team with 17 points, helping the team to a 70–49 win. The win represented the 53rd consecutive victory in an in-season tournament for the Huskies.

UConn started the season with a relatively small lineup of seven scholarship players, supplemented by two walk-ons. Injuries to Mosqueda-Lewis and Tuck reduced that lineup even further, and as the team prepared for the University of California-Davis, Stokes turned an ankle and was unavailable for practice and the game. While the limited roster forced adjustments to practice routines, it seemed to have little effect on the availability of the team to play effectively. UConn won the game by sixty points 97–37. Hartley led the team in points with 25, while freshman Chong added ten points and Jefferson recorded a season high eight assists.

After a twelve-day layoff for exams, UConn's next game was against Duke, ranked number 2 in the nation. This game would be the first game for Mosqueda-Lewis since her injury in the Stanford game. She wore a protective sleeve, and the coaching staff had no idea how she would fare, even to the point of preparing a game plan in case she was ineffective, but her return was solid. She hit seven three-pointers, a career high, helping the Huskies defeat Duke 83–61. Teammate Stewart contributed 24 points as the Huskies extended their record to 11–0.

UConn then traveled to Madison Square Garden to participate in the Maggie Dixon classic, and annual event honoring the Army coach. Stewart had 29 points, matching a career high, along with ten rebounds to help the Huskies to a win over number 20 ranked California. Stewart scored more points in the first half than the entire Bears team.

The last game of the calendar year, December 29, against Cincinnati, featured a ceremony to honor the national championship team of 2003 and 2003. Several members of those teams were in attendance for the game and the ceremony. UConn scored the first 16 points of the game but then the Bearcats outscored the Huskies 20–17 over the rest of the half. The Huskies regained their footing in the second half, ending with a 67–34 victory.

==== 2014 ====
The Huskies opened the new year in Florida, at the University of Central Florida, on New Year's Day. The Knights held a lead to the first media timeout, but the Huskies then opened up a lead they would never relinquish. USF's Briahanna Jackson scored 28 points to lead all scorers, but UConn as a team outscored the Knights to win 77–49. UConn started slow against Memphis three days later, holding only a three-point margin six minutes into the game. The Huskies then outscored the Tigers by 30 points over the rest of the first half. UConn won easily, 90–49.

UConn's next game was at home against Houston, the last place team in the AAC, whose head coach left the team before Christmas. Houston has not won since, and would not this day, as the Huskies win 90–40 behind 24 points from Stewart and 19 from Tuck. UConn then played at Webster Bank Arena in Bridgeport. Although the Huskies had played in the arena in post-season NCAA games, this was the first-ever regular season in the arena. The attendance was 9,274, a sellout, which tied a record attendance for the location. Temple, coach by former UConn assistant coach Tonya Cardoza, took an early lead but could not sustain it. Four UConn players had double-digit points, helping to secure a victory, 80–36.

The following game was against seventh ranked Baylor on Baylor's home court, where the Bears had a 69-game home winning streak. The streak began March 7, 2010, which meant no player on the current Bears team had ever lost a game at home. After five minutes, the score was even at ten points apiece.UConn scored the next seven to open up a small lead. The Huskies maintained the lead into the second half. Nine minutes into the second half, the Bears cut the lead to 50–49, but that would be as close as they would get. The Huskies went on to win 66–55, ending the Baylor home win streak.

With Rutgers moving to the Big Ten Conference next season, the UConn game at the RAC is the last scheduled league game at that arena. UConn scored first, and never gave up the lead, as Hartley scored 30 points, representing a career high. The Huskies won 94–64. Mosqueda-Lewis failed to hit a three in the game against Rutgers, only the seventh time in her career without a three in a game, but responded with five three-pointers in the following game against Memphis. Jefferson had nine steals, only one off the school record held jointly by Cathy Bochain (1980) and Jennifer Rizzotti (1996). The Huskies won 83–49 to improve to 20–0.

UConn started the season with nine scholarship players plus two walk-ons, but has had to play with fewer on several occasions. In the game against USF, Tuck was unavailable (out for the season), Banks was unavailable (ankle injury) and Chong dressed, but had stomach issues and was unable to play. This left the five starters and one scholarship player. Opposing coaches are not showing much sympathy, as the short bench has not contributed to a loss. Against USF, Stewart scored 29 to help lead the Huskies to an 81–53 win. The game against Temple on January 28 was held at McGonigle Hall an arena familiar to head coach Auriemma, as it is just six miles from where he grew up, but it was the first time he had ever coached a game there. Stewart hit 15 of 19 shot attempts, ending with a career-high 37 points. She helped lead the Huskies to a 93–56 victory.

When UConn played Cincinnati in December, the Bearcats held UConn to 67 points, their lowest scoring total of the year to that point. (South Florida would hold UConn to 63 in February.) In their second match-up of the season, defense would again be the key theme, but not by Cincinnati. The Huskies scored 86, while holding the Bearcats to just 29 points. UConn won easily, extending their season record to 23–0.

On February 4, UConn faced SMU at their campus home, Gampel. The Huskies scored the first 19 points of the game; all five starters ended with double-digit scoring. The final score in favor of UConn was 102–41. UConn next faced Louisville, in a rematch of the 2013 National Championship game. Louisville was ranked No. 4 in the country, and came in with only a single loss on the season, winners of their last 16 games, the longest winning streak in school history. The game was reasonably close early, with UConn holding only a five-point lead late in the first half. Then Stewart hit consecutive three-pointers to open up the lead before the sellout crowd. The Huskies held Louisville's leading scorer Shoni Schimmel, to nine points and won 81–64.

UConn returned to Florida to play South Florida. Despite the final score of 63–38, USF head coach Jose Fernandez had reasons for optimism. His team held UConn to the lowest points total of the season, as well as the fewest made field goals. Mosqueda-Lewis was unable to play due to mononucleosis, so Saniya Chong was a first time starter. While she did not score, she played 37 minutes and earned praise from her coach.

==== AAC tournament ====
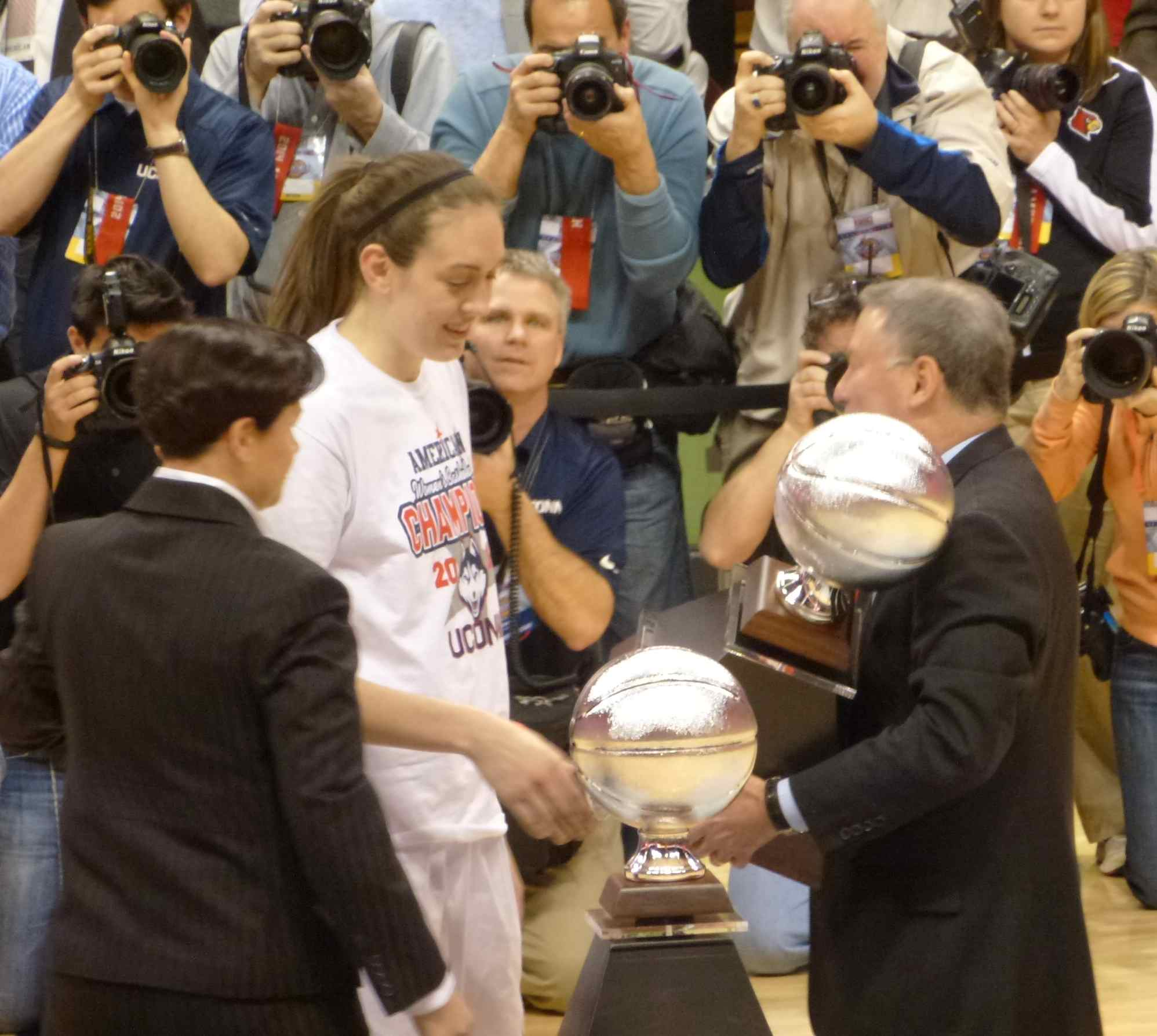
Breanna Stewart wins AAC tournament Most Outstanding Player award.

UConn had a bye for the first session of the tournament and played their first game on Saturday, March 7 against Cincinnati, the number 8 seed and winner of the 8/9 match-up with Central Florida. The Huskies never trailed, but the Bearcats stayed close early in the game, only four points behind at 17–13. However, UConn then extended the lead to 20 points by halftime, and won the game by 30 with a score of 72–42.

In the semifinal match-up with Rutgers, UConn opened the scoring early, scoring 13 points before the Scarlet Knights got on the board. Despite leading 30–9 midway through the first half, the Huskies were not relaxing. Rutgers Betnijah Laney stole the ball near mid-court and headed to her basket for a layup. Stewart started near the paint, but sprinted at top speed and managed a crowd-pleasing block. She then went to the other end of the court and drained a three-pointer to extend the lead. UConn went to win, 83–57.

The finals of the first-ever AAC tournament featured the top two seeds in the tournament, UConn and Louisville. UConn scored the first eight points of the game, and extended the lead to 27–10. The Cardinals came back with a run of their own, scoring ten of the next eleven points but UConn came back with a 12–2 run and held a 40–22 lead at halftime. UConn won 72–52 to win the conference tournament championship. Hartley, Mosqueda-Lewis and Dolson were named to the All-tournament team, while Stewart was named the Tournament Most Outstanding Player.

==== NCAA tournament ====
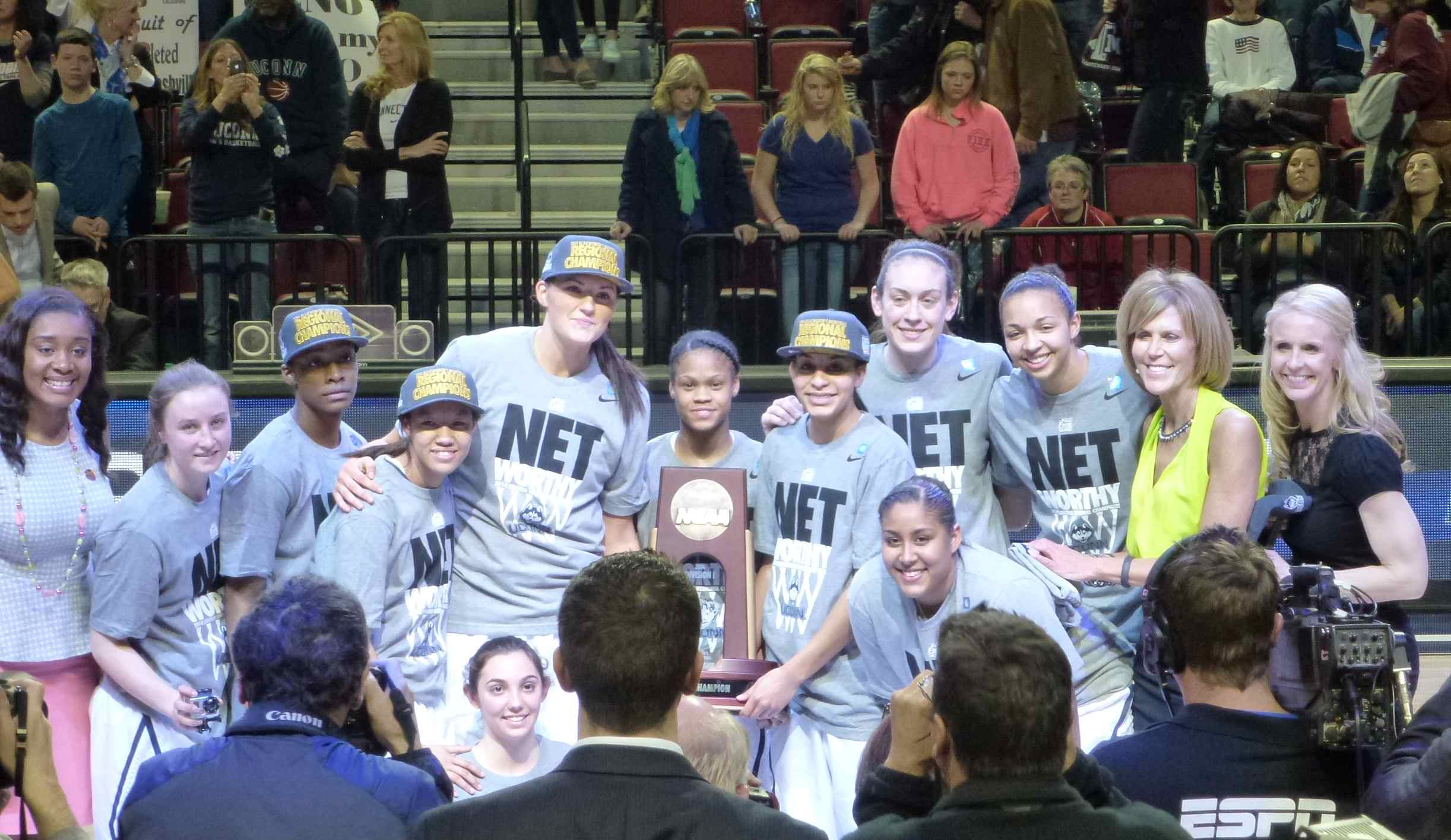
UConn women's basketball team posing with Lincoln Regional trophy

With the overall top seed in the NCAA tournament, UConn drew the weakest of the qualifying teams, Prairie View A&M University, who started the year losing their first eleven games, and ended the regular season with a losing record. However, they prevailed in their conference tournament, so were eligible for the NCAA tournament. The Huskies scored the first fifteen points of the game, and were never tested. UConn held a 44–12 lead at the half and coasted to an 83–43 final result.

UConn faced St. Joseph's in the second round. The first two rounds were hosted by UConn, so this game presented the final game in Gampel Arena for the seniors on the team. As has been the sequence in recent games, UConn opened the scoring with a run, scoring the first eight points of the game before the Hawks scored. The Huskies won 91–52, with Mosqueda-Lewis scoring 20 points, 10 rebounds and 10 assists, to record only the third triple-double in UConn history.

The Huskies played their third-round game in Lincoln, Nebraska against Brigham Young. In 1,440 minutes of play prior to this game, the UConn team had trailed for under 39 minutes in total, with zero seconds occurring in five post-season games. UConn trailed for several minutes in the first half, and although taking a one-point lead at halftime, gave up the lead and trailed in the second half for the first time this season. Hartley hit a three almost three minutes into the second half to give UConn a lead, then after BYU's Morgan Bailey tied the game, Stewart scored to give UConn a lead they would not relinquish. UConn gradually extended the lead, and won 70–51.

The second game in the Lincoln Regional was against Texas A&M. UConn scored the first basket, but the Aggies responded with eleven of the next thirteen points to take an 11–4 lead, the largest deficit UConn had faced this season. 81 seconds later, UConn tied the game on a three by Mosqueda-Lewis. Texas A&M would tie the game at 13 and 15 points each, but would never take another lead. The Aggies cut an eleven-point halftime lead to three points in the second half, but would get no closer. The final score, in favor of UConn, was 69–54.

Mosqueda-Lewis earned the regional Most Outstanding Player award. Dolson made her 150th start, which tied an NCAA record.

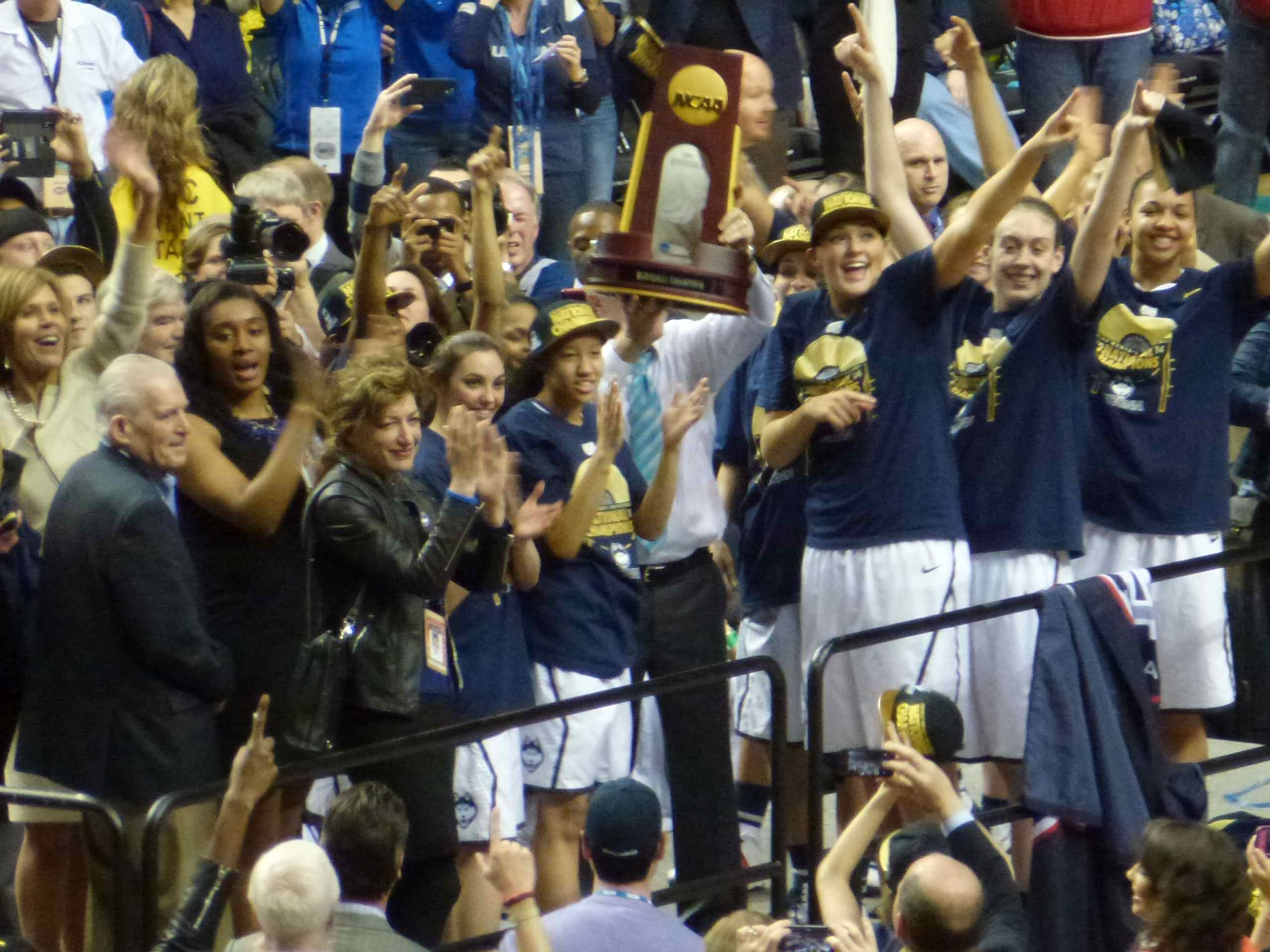
UConn team with championship trophy 2014, on the floor in Nashville, shortly after winning the game and receiving the championship trophy

Connecticut faced Stanford in the semifinal game. The Huskies scored twice before the Cardinal scored, but Stanford not only took the lead at 9–8, but extended the lead to 16–10. The two teams played evenly for some time, and with just under six minutes to go in the first half, the Cardinal still held a six-point lead, 22–16. UConn pulled out to a four-point lead by halftime, although Mosqueda-Lewis had not yet scored. She would make up for that in the second half with 15 points, one of five players in double digits. In the second half, Stanford had an early three-point shot to cut the lead to three, but they would not score again for over five minutes, by which time the margin reach 17 points at 44–27. UConn would go on to win by 19 points, 75–56.

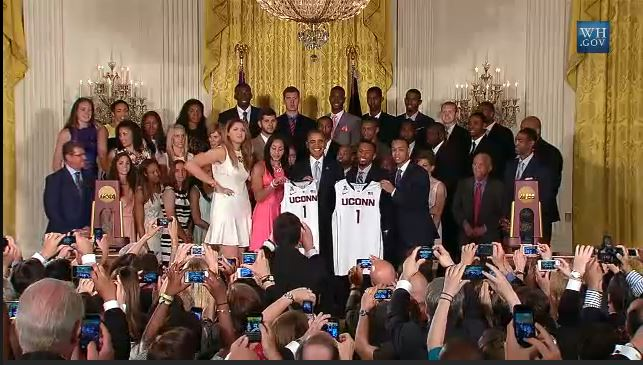
2014 UConn National championship teams at the White House

The win by UConn in the semifinal game, coupled with the win by Notre Dame over Maryland in the other semifinal set up the Championship game between two undefeated teams, a theme that has been repeated in the media. Sports Illustrated summed it up by calling it "one of the most anticipated games in the sport's history". It is the first time in NCAA history that two unbeaten teams met in the championship game. The two teams are not unfamiliar with each other; both teams were in the Big East Conference until UConn joined the AAC and Notre Dame joined the ACC. The teams played each other 16 times since the 2009–10 season; in many cases, with much on the line. Most of the games affected conference standings, were conference title games or NCAA Final Four games. Three of the game went to overtime. Because the two teams were now in different conferences, it was the first time in many years the two teams had not met in the regular season.

UConn would take an early lead in the game. Notre Dame's best post player, Natalie Achonwa, was not playing due to an ACL injury, so UConn pushed the ball inside. They would end up with a 52–22 points in the paint advantage, the "most dominating post performance women's basketball has witnessed in a title game". After pulling out to a 14-point lead midway through the first half, the Irish responded to cut the lead to seven by halftime. However, Sports Illustrated's Richard Deitsch warned in a pre-game write-up "...UConn has always been a team of runs ("spurtability," as Clark Kellogg would say) especially early in the second half". The second half opened with the teams trading baskets, but over the next seven minutes, UConn scored 16 of the next 18 points, to extend the lead from seven to 21 points. UConn would go on to win their ninth National Championship game by the same margin 79–58. The 40 wins tied an NCAA record set by Baylor two years ago.

== Roster ==
2013–14 Connecticut Huskies women's basketball team
Players
Coaches

| Pos. | # | Name | Height | Year | Previous school | Hometown |
|---|---|---|---|---|---|---|
| G | 13 | Brianna Banks | 5 ft 9 in (1.75 m) | Jr | Fayette County | Newnan, GA |
| G | 12 | Saniya Chong | 5 ft 8 in (1.73 m) | Fr | Ossining High School | Ossining, NY |
| C | 31 | Stefanie Dolson | 6 ft 5 in (1.96 m) | Sr | Minisink Valley | Port Jervis, NY |
| G | 14 | Bria Hartley | 5 ft 8 in (1.73 m) | Sr | North Babylon | North Babylon, NY |
| G | 4 | Moriah Jefferson | 5 ft 7 in (1.7 m) | So | Home-schooled | Glenn Heights, TX |
| G | 20 | Tierney Lawlor (W) | 5 ft 7 in (1.7 m) | Fr | Ansonia High School | Ansonia, CT |
| F | 23 | Kaleena Mosqueda-Lewis | 6 ft 0 in (1.83 m) | Jr | Mater Dei | Anaheim Hills, CA |
| G | 11 | Briana Pulido (W) | 5 ft 7.5 in (1.71 m) | So | Gulliver Preparatory | Miami, FL |
| F | 30 | Breanna Stewart | 6 ft 4 in (1.93 m) | So | Cicero North | Syracuse, NY |
| C | 41 | Kiah Stokes | 6 ft 3 in (1.91 m) | Jr | Linn-Mar | Marion, IA |
| F | 3 | Morgan Tuck (injured) | 6 ft 2 in (1.88 m) | So | Bolingbrook | Bolingbrook, IL |

Head coach

Geno Auriemma

Assistant coach(es)

Chris Dailey
Shea Ralph
Marisa Moseley

Legend

- (C) Team captain
- (S) Suspended
- (I) Ineligible
- (W) Walk-on
- Injured
- Current redshirt

Roster
Last update: 2024-04-03

== Schedule ==
This is the first year that UConn is in the new American Athletic Conference. In addition to a home-and-home with the nine other members in the conference. The out of conference schedule includes two out of three of the other Final Four participants from the prior year, as well as games against Baylor and Stanford. UConn will be part of the Hall of Fame classic, which includes a game in Springfield against Ohio State. In December, Connecticut will travel to Durham, North Carolina to play Duke in the Jimmy V Classic.

| Date time, TV | Rank^{#} | Opponent^{#} | Result | Record | High points | High rebounds | High assists | Site (attendance) city, state |
Exhibition
| 11/01/2013*; 7:00 pm | No. 1 | Gannon | W 101–35 | – | 21 – Stewart | 13 – Stewart | 6 – Jefferson | Gampel Pavilion (7021); Storrs, CT |
| 11/05/2013*; 7:00 pm | No. 1 | Philadelphia | W 93–28 | – | 16 – Tuck | 13 – Stokes | 8 – Mosqueda-Lewis | XL Center (6108); Hartford, CT |
Regular Season
| 11/09/2013*; 4:00 pm, SNY | No. 1 | Hartford | W 89–34 | 1–0 | 17 – Jefferson | 7 – Stokes | 5 – Jefferson | XL Center (8186); Hartford, CT |
| 11/11/2013*; 7:00 pm, ESPN2 | No. 1 | No. 3 Stanford | W 76–57 | 2–0 | 20 – Hartley | 13 – Stokes | 6 – Hartley | Gampel Pavilion (9529); Storrs, CT |
| 11/15/2013*; 6:00 pm, ESPNU | No. 1 | at No. 8 Maryland | W 72–55 | 3–0 | 26 – Stewart | 12 – Dolson | 6 – Hartley | Comcast Center (15,327); College Park, MD |
| 11/17/2013*; Noon, BTN | No. 1 | at No. 13 Penn State | W 71–52 | 4–0 | 29 – Hartley | 11 – Dolson | 6 – Dolson | Bryce Jordan Center (8194); University Park, PA |
| 11/20/2013*; 7:00 pm, SNY | No. 1 | Oregon | W 114–68 | 5–0 | 28 – Stewart | 14 – Dolson | 11 – Dolson | XL Center (7961); Hartford, CT |
| 11/22/2013*; 7:30 pm, SNY | No. 1 | Boston University; Hall of Fame Classic | W 96–38 | 6–0 | 22 – Stewart | 10 – Dolson | 7 – Hartley | Gampel Pavilion (6688); Storrs, CT |
| 11/23/2013*; 4:30 pm, SNY | No. 1 | Monmouth; Hall of Fame Classic | W 100–46 | 7–0 | 24 – Stewart | 11 – Stokes | 6 – Stewart | Gampel Pavilion (6645); Storrs, CT |
| 11/24/2013*; 5:30 pm, SNY | No. 1 | St. Bonaventure; Hall of Fame Classic | W 88–39 | 8–0 | 19 – Stokes | 15 – Dolson | 7 – Jefferson | XL Center (8242); Hartford, CT |
| 12/01/2013*; 5:30 pm, ESPN2 | No. 1 | vs. Ohio State; Hall of Fame Classic | W 70–49 | 9–0 | 17 – Hartley | 13 – Dolson | 4 – Hartley | MassMutual Center (1134); Springfield, MA |
| 12/05/2013*; 7:00 pm, SNY | No. 1 | UC Davis | W 97–37 | 10–0 | 25 – Hartley | 13 – Stewart | 9 – Jefferson | XL Center (8148); Hartford, CT |
| 12/17/2013*; 7:00 pm, ESPN2 | No. 1 | at No. 2 Duke; Jimmy V Classic | W 83–61 | 11–0 | 24 – Stewart | 11 – Stewart | 7 – Jefferson | Cameron Indoor Stadium (9314); Durham, NC |
| 12/22/2013*; 1:30 pm, ESPN2 | No. 1 | vs. No. 21 California; Maggie Dixon Classic | W 80–47 | 12–0 | 29 – Stewart | 11 – Dolson | 7 – Jefferson | Madison Square Garden (5468); New York, NY |
| 12/29/2013; 5:00 pm, ESPNU | No. 1 | Cincinnati | W 67–34 | 13–0 | 12 – 3 tied | 12 – Stewart | 4 – Mosqueda-Lewis | Gampel Pavilion (9872); Storrs, CT |
| 01/01/2014; 4:00 pm, SNY | No. 1 | at UCF | W 77–49 | 14–0 | 25 – Dolson | 12 – Dolson | 6 – Stewart | CFE Arena (3492); Orlando, FL |
| 01/04/2014; 3:00 pm, SNY | No. 1 | at Memphis | W 90–49 | 15–0 | 21 – Mosqueda-Lewis | 10 – Dolson | 4 – tied | FedExForum (6782); Memphis, TN |
| 01/07/2014; 7:00 pm, SNY | No. 1 | Houston | W 90–40 | 16–0 | 24 – Stewart | 9 – Dolson, Stewart | 6 – Jefferson | Gampel Pavilion (6257); Storrs, CT |
| 01/11/2014; Noon, SNY | No. 1 | Temple | W 80–36 | 17–0 | 19 – Hartley | 18 – Stokes | 6 – Jefferson | Webster Bank Arena (9274); Bridgeport, CT |
| 01/13/2014; 7:00 pm, ESPN2 | No. 1 | at No. 7 Baylor | W 66–55 | 18–0 | 18 – Stewart | 11 – Stewart | 5 – Jefferson | Ferrell Center (9145); Waco, TX |
| 01/19/2014; 3:00 pm, ESPN2 | No. 1 | at No. 23 Rutgers; Rivalry | W 94–64 | 19–0 | 30 – Hartley | 10 – Dolson | 8 – Jefferson | Louis Brown Athletic Center (6480); Piscataway, NJ |
| 01/22/2014; 7:00 pm, SNY | No. 1 | Memphis | W 83–49 | 20–0 | 21 – Mosqueda-Lewis | 10 – Dolson | 6 – Jefferson | XL Center (8365); Hartford, CT |
| 01/26/2014; Noon, CBSSN | No. 1 | USF | W 81–53 | 21–0 | 29 – Stewart | 8 – Dolson | 7 – Jefferson | XL Center (13,207); Hartford, CT |
| 01/28/2014; 7:00 pm, SNY | No. 1 | at Temple | W 93–56 | 22–0 | 37 – Stewart | 13 – Dolson | 12 – Jefferson | McGonigle Hall (2030); Philadelphia, PA |
| 02/01/2014; 2:00 pm, SNY | No. 1 | at Cincinnati | W 86–29 | 23–0 | 17 – tied | 8 – tied | 6 – Jefferson | Fifth Third Arena (1491); Cincinnati, OH |
| 02/04/2014; 7:00 pm, SNY | No. 1 | SMU | W 102–41 | 24–0 | 21 – Hartley | 11 – tied | 7 – Mosqueda-Lewis | Gampel Pavilion (7839); Storrs, CT |
| 02/09/2014; 1:00 pm, ESPN | No. 1 | No. 4 Louisville | W 81–64 | 25–0 | 24 – Stewart | 10 – Stewart | 6 – Stewart | Gampel Pavilion (10,027); Storrs, CT |
| 02/16/2014; 4:00 pm, CBSSN | No. 1 | at South Florida | W 63–38 | 26–0 | 18 – Hartley | 8 – 3 tied | 8 – Jefferson | USF Sun Dome (6615); Tampa, FL |
| 02/19/2014; 7:00 pm, SNY | No. 1 | UCF | W 83–35 | 27–0 | 23 – Stewart | 13 – Stewart | 5 – tied | XL Center (9815); Hartford, CT |
| 02/22/2014; 5:00 pm, SNY | No. 1 | at Houston | W 92–41 | 28–0 | 24 – tied | 9 – Dolson | 5 – tied | Hofheinz Pavilion (1569); Houston, TX |
| 02/25/2014; 8:00 pm, SNY | No. 1 | at SMU | W 91–48 | 29–0 | 26 – Hartley | 9 – Dolson | 5 – tied | Moody Coliseum (1569); University Park, TX |
| 03/01/2014; 4:00 pm, CBSSN | No. 1 | No. 24 Rutgers; Rivalry | W 72–35 | 30–0 | 20 – tied | 10 – tied | 4 – tied | Gampel Pavilion (10,167); Storrs, CT |
| 03/03/2014; 7:00 pm, ESPN2 | No. 1 | at No. 3 Louisville | W 68–48 | 31–0 | 22 – Stewart | 14 – Stewart | 6 – Dolson | KFC Yum! Center (22,163); Louisville, KY |
2014 AAC tournament
| 03/08/2014; 2:20 pm, ESPN3 | No. 1 | vs. Cincinnati; Quarterfinals | W 72–42 | 32–0 | 22 – Stewart | 9 – Dolson | 4 – Hartley | Mohegan Sun Arena (7332); Uncasville, CT |
| 03/09/2014; 1:00 pm, ESPNU | No. 1 | vs. No. 24 Rutgers; Semifinals/Rivalry | W 83–57 | 33–0 | 22 – Stewart | 7 – Stewart | 9 – Hartley | Mohegan Sun Arena (7635); Uncasville, CT |
| 03/10/2014; 7:00 pm, ESPN | No. 1 | vs. No. 3 Louisville; Championship game | W 72–52 | 34–0 | 20 – Stewart | 16 – Dolson | 6 – tied | Mohegan Sun Arena (8034); Uncasville, CT |
2014 NCAA tournament
| 03/23/2014*; 8:05 pm, ESPN | No. 1 | Prairie View A&M; First round | W 87–44 | 35–0 | 19 – Stewart | 10 – tied | 6 – Dolson | Gampel Pavilion (5018); Storrs, CT |
| 03/25/2014*; 7:00 pm, ESPNU | No. 1 | Saint Joseph's; Second round | W 91–52 | 36–0 | 21 – Stewart | 11 – Stewart | 10 – Mosqueda-Lewis | Gampel Pavilion (4245); Storrs, CT |
| 03/29/2014*; 4:30 pm, ESPN | No. 1 | vs. BYU; Sweet Sixteen | W 70–51 | 37–0 | 19 – Mosqueda-Lewis | 13 – tied | 5 – Hartley | Pinnacle Bank Arena (9585); Lincoln, NE |
| 03/31/2014*; 9:30 pm, ESPN | No. 1 | vs. No. 15 Texas A&M; Elite Eight | W 69–54 | 38–0 | 17 – Mosqueda-Lewis | 10 – Dolson | 7 – Jefferson | Pinnacle Bank Arena (7169); Lincoln, NE |
| 04/06/2014*; 8:30 pm, ESPN | No. 1 (1 MW) | vs. No. 6 Stanford; Final Four | W 75–56 | 39–0 | 18 – Stewart | 7 – tied | 4 – tied | Bridgestone Arena (17,548); Nashville, TN |
| 04/08/2014*; 8:30 pm, ESPN | No. 1 (1 MW) | vs. No. 2 Notre Dame; Championship game | W 79–58 | 40–0 | 21 – Stewart | 16 – Dolson | 7 – tied | Bridgestone Arena (17,570); Nashville, TN |
*Non-conference game. ^{#}Rankings from AP Poll. (#) Tournament seedings in parentheses. All times are in EST.

== First Night ==
For many years, the NCAA earliest-allowable date for formal practice was the same day for all basketball teams, both men and women. This led to some teams celebrating the start of the season with an event, often called Midnight Madness. The start time was changed from midnight, and schools adopted various names. In recent years, the NCAA has changed the way the date of initial practice is determined, with slightly different rules for men and women, so the first date can vary by school. Some school still plan a pre-season event, even though that event no longer coincides with the first date of practice.

At UConn the event is called "First Night". In 2013, at Gampel Pavilion, it included player introductions with dance routines. The players from both the men's teams and women's team were assigned to two teams, one coached by women's coach Geno Auriemma and the other coached by men's coach Kevin Ollie. After competing against each other in trivia games where they had to identify cartoon characters drawn by three-year-olds, they played a five-on-five scrimmage, generally with three males and two females on each team. It was a lighthearted affair, with little actual defense, and many dunks. Team Geno won with a late three-pointer by Omar Calhoun. The arena was close to full, with an estimated 10,000 fans in attendance.

== WNBA draft ==
Dolsen and Hartley were selected in the first round of the draft in consecutive picks. Dolson was chosen 6th, by the Washington Mystics. Hartley was the next player chosen, initially by the Seattle Storm, but traded an hour later to Washington, so the teammates continue to be teammates.

== Awards and honors ==
- Breanna Stewart earned the Most Valuable Player at the U19 World Championships.
- Saniya Chong won the Parade Magazine Girls Basketball Player of the Year award.
- Saniya Chong won the National High School Coaches Association girls basketball National Player of the Year award.
- Bria Hartley and Kaleena Mosqueda-Lewis were each awarded a gold medal for winning the 2013 World University Games competition.
- Moriah Jefferson, Breanna Stewart and Morgan Tuck were each awarded a gold medal for winning the U19 World Championship.
- Chris Dailey was inducted into the New England Basketball Hall of Fame.
- Prior to the game against Houston, Jefferson, Tuck, Stewart, Hartley and Mosqueda-Lewis were honored in a special ceremony to acknowledge their contributions to USA Basketball.
- Stewart was named the American Athletic Conference Player of the Year.
- Stewart was named ESPNW player of the year.
- Stewart was named as a member of the ESPNW First team All-Americans.
- Stefanie Dolson was named the Senior CLASS Award winner for women's basketball.
- Stefanie Dolson was named the WBCA Division I Defensive Player of the Year.
