= 2014 American Athletic Conference women's basketball tournament =

- Tournament Logo
- Classification: Division I
- Season: 2013–14
- Teams: 10
- Site: Mohegan Sun Arena; Uncasville, Connecticut
- Champions: Connecticut (1st title)
- Winning coach: Geno Auriemma (1st title)
- Attendance: 33,069
- Television: ESPN, ESPNU, ESPN3

2013–14 American Athletic Conference women's basketball standings
	Conf.				Overall
Team	W		L	PCT	W		L	PCT
No. 1 UConn†	18	–	0	1.000	40	–	0	1.000
No. 4 Louisville	16	–	2	.889	33	–	5	.868
South Florida	13	–	5	.722	23	–	13	.639
Rutgers	12	–	6	.667	28	–	9	.757
SMU	8	–	10	.444	18	–	14	.563
Temple	8	–	10	.444	14	–	16	.467
Memphis	6	–	12	.333	13	–	18	.419
Cincinnati	5	–	13	.278	13	–	18	.419
UCF	3	–	15	.167	10	–	20	.333
Houston	1	–	17	.056	6	–	25	.194
† American Tournament winner winner As of 8 April 2014; Rankings from AP poll

The 2014 American Athletic Conference women's basketball tournament was the first annual conference tournament of the American Athletic Conference, one of the two leagues that resulted from the 2013 split of the original Big East Conference. The tournament was held March 7–10, 2014 in the Mohegan Sun Arena in Uncasville, Connecticut and decided the champion of the 2013–14 American Athletic Conference women's basketball season. The 10 conference members competed in a single-elimination tournament for an automatic bid to the 2014 NCAA tournament.

The American Athletic Conference originally consisted of the members of the "old" Big East which played Division I FBS football, plus several new members which also sponsored FBS programs.

== Seeds ==
All the teams in the American Athletic Conference qualified for the tournament. Teams were seeded based on conference record, with a tiebreaker system used as needed. Teams seeded 7 through 10 had to play in the opening round, and teams seeded 1 through 6 received a bye to the second round.

Seed	School	Conf (Overall)	Tiebreaker
1	Connecticut	18-0 (31-0)	
2	Louisville	16-2 (28-3)	
3	South Florida	13-5 (18-11)	
4	Rutgers	12-6 (21-8)	
5	SMU	8-10 (17-12)	2-0 vs. Cincinnati
6	Temple	8-10 (14-15)	1-1 vs. Cincinnati
7	Memphis	6-12 (13-17)	
8	Cincinnati	5-13 (12-17)	
9	UCF	3-15 (10-19)	
10	Houston	1-17 (5-24)	
‡ – American Athletic Conference regular season champions. # – Received a first-round bye in the conference tournament. Overall record are as of the end of the regular season.

== Schedule ==
All tournament games were nationally televised on an ESPN network:

Session	Game	Time*	Matchup^{#}	Television	Attendance
First round – Friday, March 7
1	1	6:00 PM	#8 Cincinnati vs. #9 UCF	ESPN3	4,675
1	2	8:00 PM	#7 Memphis vs. #10 Houston	ESPN3	4,675
Second round – Saturday, March 8
2	3	12:00 PM	#1 Connecticut vs. #8 Cincinnati	ESPN3	7,332
2	4	2:00 PM	#4 Rutgers vs. #5 SMU	ESPN3	7,332
3	5	6:00 PM	#3 South Florida vs. #6 Temple	ESPN3	5,393
3	6	8:00 PM	#2 Louisville vs. #10 Houston	ESPN3	5,393
Semifinals – Sunday, March 9
4	7	1:00 PM	#1 Connecticut vs. #4 Rutgers	ESPNU	7,635
4	8	3:00 PM	#2 Louisville vs. #3 South Florida	ESPNU	7,635
Championship Game – Monday, March 10
5	9	7:00 PM	#1 Connecticut vs. #2 Louisville	ESPN	8,034
*Game Times in EST. #-Rankings denote tournament seeding.

== Bracket ==
First round Friday, March 7
8	Cincinnati	54
9	UCF	52
7	Memphis	67
10	Houston	73

Quarterfinals; Saturday, March 8
1	Connecticut	72
8	Cincinnati	42
4	Rutgers	68
5	SMU	49
2	Louisville	88
10	Houston	43
3	South Florida	72
6	Temple	44

Semifinals; Sunday, March 9
1	Connecticut	83
4	Rutgers	57
2	Louisville	60
3	South Florida	56

Championship game Monday, March 10
1	Connecticut	72
2	Louisville	52
