= Joe Curl =

American women's basketball coach

Biographical details
- Born: December 1, 1954; Sioux City, Iowa, U.S.
- Died: April 14, 2014 (aged 59); Houston, Texas, U.S.

Playing career

Basketball
- 1975–1978: Wayne State (NE)

Coaching career (HC unless noted)

Basketball
- 1979–1981: South Sioux City HS (boys' asst.)
- 1981–1982: South Sioux City HS (girls')
- 1982–1984: South Sioux City HS (boys')
- 1984–1986: Kansas Newman (men's asst.)
- 1986–1987: Kapaun Mt. Carmel Catholic HS (boys')
- 1987–1989: Central State (OK) (men's and women's asst.)
- 1990–1993: Trinity Valley CC
- 1993–1994: Stephen F. Austin
- 1994–1996: Blinn
- 1996–1998: Blinn (men's)
- 1998–2010: Houston

Volleyball
- 1987–1989: Central State (OK)

Head coaching record
- Overall: 216–174 (.554) (NCAA); 97–51 (.655) (NJCAA women); 18–42 (.300) (NJCAA men)
- Tournaments: 1–3 (NCAA); 4–2 (WNIT)

Accomplishments and honors

Championships
- C-USA regular season (2004); C-USA Tournament (2004)

Awards
- USBWA Women's National Coach of the Year (2004); AP Women's Coach of the Year (2004)

Joseph Allen Curl (December 1, 1954 – April 14, 2014) was an American women's basketball coach at the University of Houston. He coached at Houston for twelve years, during which time he compiled a 193–167 record. In 2001 and 2002, the Cougars made back-to-back WNIT appearances, and in 2004 and 2005, back-to-back NCAA appearances.

As a junior college and NCAA head coach, he had a career 331–252 (.554) record.

== Early life and education ==
Born in Sioux City, Iowa, Curl grew up in nearby South Sioux City, Nebraska and graduated from Wayne State College in Wayne, Nebraska in 1978 with a bachelor's degree and was a basketball player there.

== Coaching career ==
=== High school and junior college (1981–1993) ===
Curl returned to South Sioux City after college to become a teacher at South Sioux City High. In 1979, Curl became an assistant boys' basketball coach at the school. After two years in that position, Curl became girls' basketball head coach and went 3–17 in the 1981–82 season. From 1982 to 1984 as boys' head coach, Curl went a cumulative 7–29.

In 1984, Curl moved to Wichita, Kansas to become an assistant coach for a newly formed men's basketball program at Kansas Newman College (now Newman University, Wichita), in addition to a physical education teacher and athletic director at Saint Thomas Aquinas High School. Curl became head boys' basketball coach at Kapaun Mt. Carmel Catholic High School, also in Wichita, in June 1986. After a 6–14 record in the 1986–87 season, Curl resigned in June 1987.

Curl entered graduate school at the University of Central Oklahoma in 1987 and earned his master's degree in 1990. While pursuing graduate studies, Curl was head women's volleyball coach as well as an assistant coach for both the men's and women's basketball teams for the Central Oklahoma Bronchos from 1987 to 1989.

From 1990 to 1993, Curl was head women's basketball coach at Trinity Valley Community College in Athens, Texas and went 56–23 in his three seasons as head coach, including a 26–4 record and number-one national ranking in the 1992–93 season.

=== Stephen F. Austin and Blinn (1993–1998) ===
Curl had his first NCAA-level position in the 1993–94 as head women's basketball coach at Stephen F. Austin State University, during which he helped the Ladyjacks to the Southland Conference women's basketball tournament title and NCAA tournament appearance.

Curl was head women's basketball at Blinn College from 1994 to 1996, with a 31–28 overall record. From 1996 to 1998, Curl coached men's basketball at Blinn, going 18–42.

=== Houston (1998–2010) ===
Curl became head coach at the University of Houston in 1998. After two losing seasons, Curl led the Houston Cougars to a 19–13 record and WNIT first round appearance in the 2000–01 season. In 2001–02, Curl led Houston to a 26–8 record and to the WNIT final.

In the 2003–2004 campaign, the Cougars went 28–4, establishing school records for wins and winning percentage. The Cougars won both the Conference USA regular season and tournament titles. That qualified them for a number 3 seed in the tournament. For his success, he achieved national coach of the year honors by several media outlets.

Curl was awarded the US Basketball Writers Association (USBWA) Coach of the Year award in 2004, as well as the AP College Basketball Coach of the Year

From 2000 to 2005, Curl's staff included Todd Buchanan who would ultimately serve as head coach of Houston upon his retirement.

He died on April 14, 2014, at the age of 59.

== Head coaching record ==
=== Women's basketball ===
The following table lists Curl's record as an NCAA head coach.

Record table
| Season | Team | Overall | Conference | Standing | Postseason |
|---|---|---|---|---|---|
Stephen F. Austin Ladyjacks (Southland Conference) (1993–1994)
| 1993–94 | Stephen F. Austin | 23–7 | 16–2 | 1st | NCAA first round |
| Stephen F. Austin: | | 23–7 (.767) | 16–2 (.889) | | |
Houston Cougars (Conference USA) (1998–2010)
| 1998–99 | Houston | 5–22 | 1–15 | 12th | |
| 1999–2000 | Houston | 7–21 | 3–13 | 5th | |
| 2000–01 | Houston | 19–13 | 10–6 | 3rd | WNIT First Round |
| 2001–02 | Houston | 26–8 | 11–3 | 2nd | WNIT Runner-up |
| 2002–03 | Houston | 15–13 | 6–8 | 6th | |
| 2003–04 | Houston | 28–4 | 13–1 | 1st | NCAA second round |
| 2004–05 | Houston | 21–9 | 10–4 | T–3rd | NCAA first round |
| 2005–06 | Houston | 12–17 | 8–8 | T–6th | |
| 2006–07 | Houston | 9–19 | 5–11 | T–9th | |
| 2007–08 | Houston | 15–16 | 9–7 | 4th | |
| 2008–09 | Houston | 19–10 | 11–5 | T–2nd | |
| 2009–10 | Houston | 17–15 | 10–6 | T–2nd | WNIT First Round |
| Houston: | | 193–167 (.536) | 97–87 (.527) | | |
| Total: | | 216–174 (.554) | | | |
National champion Postseason invitational champion Conference regular season champion Conference regular season and conference tournament champion Division regular season champion Division regular season and conference tournament champion Conference tournament champion

=== Women's volleyball ===
Record table
| Season | Team | Overall | Conference | Standing | Postseason |
|---|---|---|---|---|---|
Central State Bronchos (NAIA Independent) (1987)
| 1987 | Central State (OK) | 3–24 | | | |
Central State Bronchos (Lone Star Conference) (1988–1989)
| 1988 | Central State (OK) | 3–25 | 1–13 | | |
| 1989 | Central State (OK) | 23–21 | 5–11 | | |
| Central State (OK): | | 29–70 (.293) | 6–24 (.200) | | |
| Total: | | 29–70 (.293) | | | |
National champion Postseason invitational champion Conference regular season champion Conference regular season and conference tournament champion Division regular season champion Division regular season and conference tournament champion Conference tournament champion
