= Houston Cougars women's basketball =

2025–26 Houston Cougars women's basketball team
- University: University of Houston
- First season: 1975–76; 51 years ago
- Head coach: Matthew Mitchell (1st season)
- Location: Houston, Texas
- Arena: Fertitta Center (capacity: 7,100)
- Conference: Big 12 Conference
- Nickname: Cougars
- Colors: Scarlet and white

NCAA Division I tournament second round
- 1988, 2004

NCAA Division I tournament appearances
- 1988, 1992, 2004, 2005, 2011

Conference tournament champions
- 2004

Conference regular-season champions
- 2004, 2011

Uniforms
Home	Away

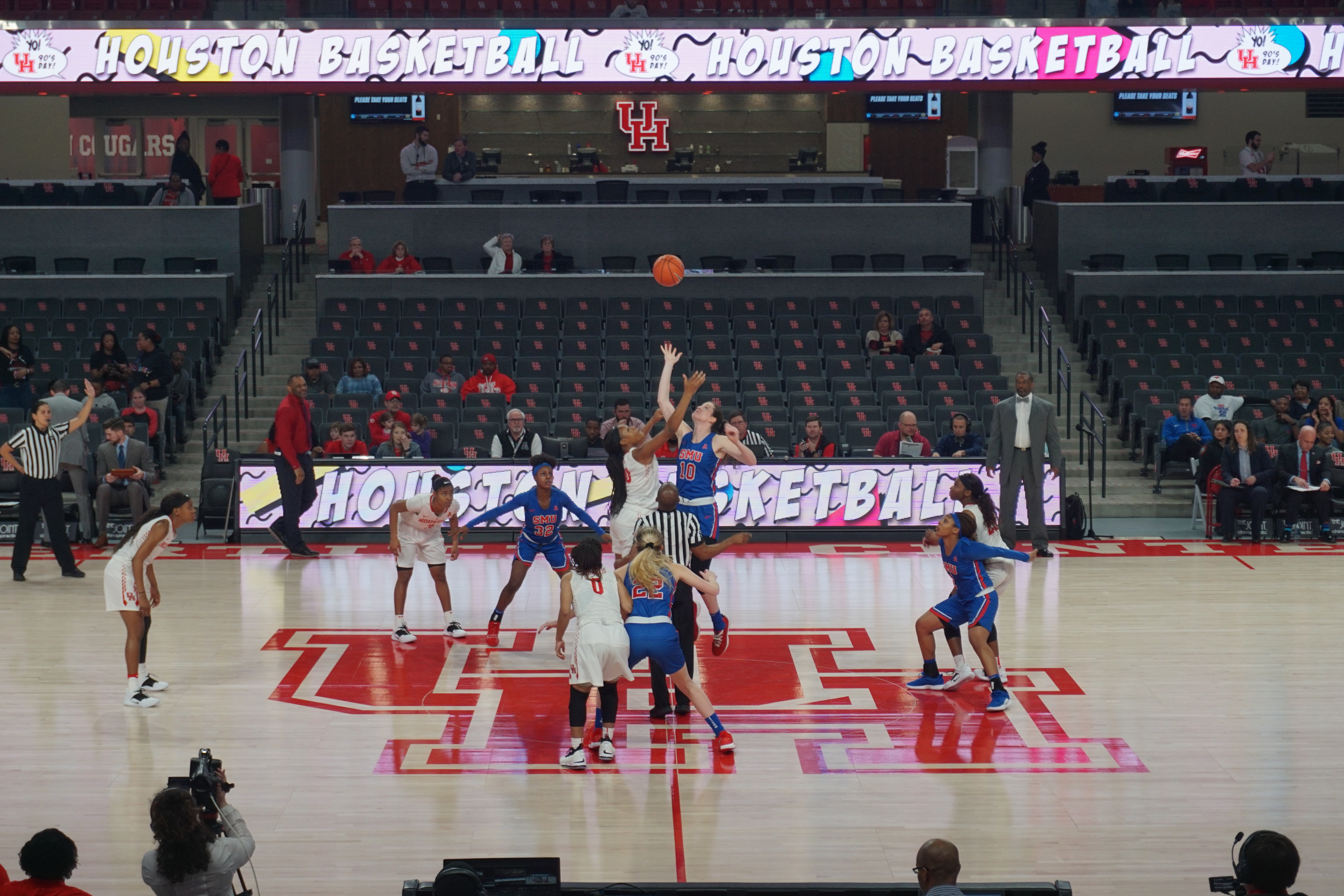
The 2018–19 Houston team in action against SMU

The Houston Cougars women's basketball team represents the University of Houston in NCAA Division I women's basketball. The team plays their home games at Fertitta Center on-campus at the University of Houston.

== Conference affiliations ==
- Texas Association for Intercollegiate Athletics for Women (1975–1982)
- Southwest Conference (1982–1996)
- Conference USA (1996–2013)
- American Athletic Conference (2013–2023)
- Big 12 Conference (2023–present)

== Notable former players ==
Name	Career at Houston	Notability	Year drafted by WNBA	Reference
Chandi Jones	2000–04	WNBA player for the Phoenix Mercury, Detroit Shock, and Minnesota Lynx	2004	
Monica Lamb-Powell	1983–85	WNBA player for the Houston Comets	1998	
Sancho Lyttle	2001–05	WNBA player for the Houston Comets	2005	

== Individual awards ==
=== National award winners ===
Associated Press College Basketball Coach of the Year

- Joe Curl – 2004

espn.com National Coach of the Year

- Joe Curl – 2004

Basketball TImes Women's College Basketball Coach of the Year Award

- Joe Curl – 2004

=== National Player of the Year awards ===
Women's Basketball News Service National Comeback Player of the Year Award

- Chandi Jones – 2001

Naismith College Player of the Year

- Chandi Jones – finalist 2004

John R. Wooden Award

- Chandi Jones – finalist 2004

=== All-Americans ===
==== Key ====
AP	Associated Press	USBWA	United States Basketball Writers Association
WBCA/Kodak	Women's Basketball Coaches Association	CoSIDA	College Sports Information Directors Association

Year	Player	Position	Selector(s)
2002	Chandi Jones	G	AP (HM), USBWA (2nd)
2003	Chandi Jones	G	AP (HM)
2004	Chandi Jones	G	AP (2nd), WBCA/Kodak (1st)
2012	Roxanna Button	G	CoSIDA Academic (1st)

Note: HM stands for honorable mention.

=== Conference Player of the Year ===
The following Houston players have been named Conference Player of the Year while at UH.

Season	Player	Position	Conference
1985–86	Sonya Watkins	F	Southwest
2001–02	Chandi Jones	G	Conference USA
2002–03	Chandi Jones	G	Conference USA
2003–04	Chandi Jones	G	Conference USA
2009–10	Courtney Taylor	F	The American
2010–11	Courtney Taylor	F	The American

=== Conference Defensive Player of the Year ===
The following Houston players have been named Conference Defensive Player of the Year while at UH.

Season	Player	Position	Conference
2001–02	Nicole Oliver	G	Conference USA

=== Conference Sixth Player of the Year ===
The following Houston players have been named Conference Sixth Player of the Year while at UH.

Season	Player	Position	Conference
2022–23	Tiara Young	G	The American

=== Conference Newcomer or Freshman of the Year ===
The following Houston players have been named Conference Newcomer of the Year or Freshman of the Year while at UH.

Season	Player	Position	Conference
1986–87	Missy Davis	C	Southwest
1994–95	Stacey Johnson (newcomer)	G	Southwest
1994–95	Jennifer Jones (freshman)	F	Southwest
1997–98	ShaRonda Lassiter	F	Conference USA
2000–01	Chandi Jones	G	Conference USA

== Year-by year-results ==
Conference tournament winners noted with #.

Season	Team	Overall	Conference	Standing	Postseason	Coaches' poll	AP poll
Connie Payne (Independent) (1975–1976)
1975–76	Connie Payne	11–18	–		Texas AIAW		
Connie Payne:		11–18	–				
Dot Woodfin (Independent, Southwest) (1976–1985)
1976–77	Dot Woodfin	23–10	–		AIAW Southwest Regional		
1977–78	Dot Woodfin	26–15	–		AIAW Southwest Regional		
1978–79	Dot Woodfin	17–13	–		AIAW Southwest Regional		
1979–80	Dot Woodfin	17–13	–		AIAW Southwest Regional		
1980–81	Dot Woodfin	21–10	–		AIAW State Tournament		
1981–82	Dot Woodfin	18–11	–				
Southwest Conference
1982–83	Dot Woodfin	17–11	5–3	4th (Southwest)			
1983–84	Dot Woodfin	16–12	9–7	T-4th			
1984–85	Dot Woodfin	22–8	11–5	T-3rd			
Dot Woodfin:		177–103	25–15				
Greg Williams (Southwest) (1985–1990)
1985–86	Greg Williams	19–10	9–7	T-4th			
1986–87	Greg Williams	19–10	10–6	T-3rd			
1987–88	Greg Williams	22–7	12–4	2nd	NCAA Second Round (Bye)	25	
1988–89	Greg Williams	16–12	9–7	T-4th			
1989–90	Greg Williams	17–12	9–7	4th			
Greg Williams:		93–51	49–31				
Jessie Kenlaw (Southwest, Conference USA) (1990–1998)
1990–91	Jessie Kenlaw	20–12	10–6	4th (Southwest)	NWIT Fourth Place		
1991–92	Jessie Kenlaw	22–8	10–4	3rd	NCAA First Round		22
1992–93	Jessie Kenlaw	11–16	5–9	6th			
1993–94	Jessie Kenlaw	11–15	5–9	T-5th			
1994–95	Jessie Kenlaw	14–14	7–7	T-4th			
1995–96	Jessie Kenlaw	12–16	4–10	5th			
Conference USA
1996–97	Jessie Kenlaw	5–24	0–14	4th (White) (CUSA)			
1997–98	Jessie Kenlaw	9–18	3–13	6th (National)			
Jessie Kenlaw:		104–123	44–72				
Joe Curl (Conference USA) (1998–2007)
1998–99	Joe Curl	5–22	1–15	6th (National)			
1999–2000	Joe Curl	7–21	3–13	T-5th (National)			
2000–01	Joe Curl	19–13	10–6	T-2nd (National)	WNIT First Round		
2001–02	Joe Curl	26–8	11–3	T-2nd	WNIT Finals		
2002–03	Joe Curl	15–13	6–8	T-7th			
2003–04	Joe Curl	28–4	13–1	1st#	NCAA Second Round	16	9
2004–05	Joe Curl	21–9	10–4	T-3rd	NCAA First Round		
2005–06	Joe Curl	12–17	8–8	T-6th			
2006–07	Joe Curl	9–19	5–11	T-9th			
Danny Hughes (Conference USA) (2007–2008)
2007–08	Danny Hughes	15–16	9–7	4th			
Danny Hughes:		15–16	9–7				
Joe Curl (Conference USA) (2008–2010)
2008–09	Joe Curl	19–10	11–5	T-2nd			
2009–10	Joe Curl	17–15	10–6	T-2nd	WNIT First Round		
Joe Curl:		178–151	88–80				
Todd Buchanan (Conference USA, American) (2010–2013)
2010–11	Todd Buchanan	26–6	16–0	1st (CUSA)	NCAA First Round		22
2011–12	Todd Buchanan	3–26	2–14	12th			
2012–13	Todd Buchanan	13–17	7–9	T-8th			
American Athletic Conference
2013–14 (portion)	Todd Buchanan	4–7	0–0	NA			
Todd Buchanan:		46–56	25–23				
Wade Scott (American) (2013–2014)
2013–14 (portion)	Wade Scott (interim)	2–18	1–17	10th			
Wade Scott:		2–18	1–17				
Ronald Hughey (American, Big 12) (2014–2025)
2014–15	Ronald Hughey	6–24	1–17	11th			
2015–16	Ronald Hughey	6–24	2–16	11th			
2016–17	Ronald Hughey	12–19	4–12	10th			
2017–18	Ronald Hughey	20–12	9–7	T-5th	WNIT First Round		
2018–19	Ronald Hughey	15–16	9–7	4th	WNIT First Round		
2019–20	Ronald Hughey	12–19	5–11	10th			
2020–21	Ronald Hughey	17–8	12–5	3rd			
2021–22	Ronald Hughey	18–16	7–9	6th			
2022–23	Ronald Hughey	15–16	10–5	4th			
Big 12 Conference
2023–24	Ronald Hughey	14–16	5–13	T-11th			
2024–25	Ronald Hughey	5–25	1–17	16th			
Ronald Hughey:		140–195	65–119				
Matthew Mitchell (Big 12) (2025–present)
2025–26	Matthew Mitchell	7-23	1-17	16th			
Matthew Mitchell:		7–23	1–17				
Total:		738–730					
National champion Postseason invitational champion Conference regular season champion Conference regular season and conference tournament champion Division regular season champion Division regular season and conference tournament champion Conference tournament champion

== NCAA tournament results ==
Year	Seed	Round	Opponent	Result
1988	#6	Second Round	#3 Ole Miss	L 68–74
1992	#8	First Round	#9 UC Santa Barbara	L 69–80
2004	#3	First Round; Second Round	#14 Green Bay #11 UC Santa Barbara	W 62–47; L 52–56
2005	#10	First Round	#7 Boston College	L 43–65
2011	#8	First Round	#9 West Virginia	L 73–78
