= Big Ten Conference basketball tournament =

The phrase Big Ten Conference basketball tournament may refer to:

- Big Ten men's basketball tournament
- Big Ten women's basketball tournament
