= List of Big Ten Conference women's basketball regular season champions =

The Big Ten Conference began sponsoring women's basketball during the 1982–83 basketball season. In February 1982 during the 1981–82 season, the conference held a tournament at Michigan State in which Ohio State defeated Illinois 69–66 in the championship game. The conference has listed this in some publications as a regular season championship.

Year	Champion	Conference Record	Notes
1982–83	Indiana / Ohio State	15–3	Big Ten began sponsoring women's basketball
1983–84	Ohio State (2)	17–1	
1984–85	Ohio State (3)	18–0	
1985–86	Ohio State (4)	16–2	
1986–87	Iowa / Ohio State (5)	17–1	
1987–88	Iowa (2)	17–1	
1988–89	Iowa (3) / Ohio State (6)	16–2	
1989–90	Iowa (4) / Northwestern	15–3	
1990–91	Purdue	17–1	
1991–92	Iowa (5)	16–2	
1992–93	Iowa (6) / Ohio State (7)	16–2	Penn State joins Big Ten Conference
1993–94	Penn State / Purdue (2)	16–2	
1994–95	Penn State (2) / Purdue (3)	13–3	
1995–96	Iowa (7)	15–1	
1996–97	Illinois / Michigan State / Purdue (4)	12–4	
1997–98	Iowa (8)	13–3	
1998–99	Purdue (5)	16–0	
1999–00	Penn State (3)	15–1	
2000–01	Purdue (6)	14–2	
2001–02	Purdue (7)	13–3	
2002–03	Penn State (4)	13–3	
2003–04	Penn State (5)	15–1	
2004–05	Michigan State (2) / Ohio State (8)	14–2	
2005–06	Ohio State (9)	15–1	
2006–07	Ohio State (10)	15–1	
2007–08	Iowa (9) / Ohio State (11)	13–5	
2008–09	Ohio State (12)	15–3	
2009–10	Ohio State (13)	15–3	
2010–11	Michigan State (3)	13–3	
2011–12	Penn State (6)	13–3	Nebraska joins Big Ten Conference
2012–13	Penn State (7)	14–2	
2013–14	Michigan State (4) / Penn State (8)	13–3	
2014–15	Maryland	18–0	Maryland and Rutgers join Big Ten Conference
2015–16	Maryland (2)	16–2	
2016–17	Maryland (3) / Ohio State (14)^	15–1	
2017–18	Ohio State (15)^	13–3	
2018–19	Maryland (4)	15–3	
2019–20	Maryland (5) / Northwestern (2)	16–2	
2020–21	Maryland (6)	17–1	
2021–22	Iowa (10) / Ohio State (16)	14–4	
2022–23	Indiana (2)	16–2	
2023–24	Ohio State (17)	16–2	
2024–25	USC	17–1	Oregon, UCLA, USC and Washington joins Big Ten Conference
2025–26	UCLA	18-0	

== Championships by school ==
School	Big Ten championships	Year
Ohio State	17^	1983, **1984**, **1985**, **1986**, 1987, 1989, 1993, 2005, **2006**, **2007**, 2008, **2009**, **2010**, 2017^, **2018^**, 2022, **2024**
Iowa	10	1987, **1988**, 1989, 1990, **1992**, 1993, **1996**, **1998**, 2008, 2022
Penn State	8	1994, 1995, **2000**, **2003**, **2004**, **2012**, **2013**, 2014
Purdue	7	**1991**, 1994, 1995, 1997, **1999**, **2001**, **2002**
Maryland	6	**2015**, **2016**, 2017, **2019**, 2020, **2021**
Michigan State	4	1997, 2005, **2011**, 2014
Northwestern	2	1990, 2020
Indiana	2	1983, **2023**
Illinois	1	1997
USC	1	**2025**
UCLA	1	**2026**
Michigan	0	
Minnesota	0	
Nebraska	0	
Oregon	0	
Rutgers	0	
Washington	0	
Wisconsin	0	

Bold indicates an outright championship.

^ Indicates forfeited games and championships by Ohio State.

== See also ==
- Big Ten Conference men's basketball regular season champions
- Big Ten Conference men's basketball tournament
- Big Ten Conference women's basketball tournament
