= 2013–14 Michigan Wolverines women's basketball team =

Intercollegiate basketball season

2013–14 Michigan Wolverines women's basketball

WNIT, Third Round
- Conference: Big Ten Conference
- Record: 20–14 (8–8 Big Ten)
- Head coach: Kim Barnes Arico (2nd season)
- Assistant coaches: Melanie Moore; Chester Nichols; Joy McCorvey
- Home arena: Crisler Center

2013–14 Big Ten women's basketball standings
	Conf.				Overall
Team	W		L	PCT	W		L	PCT
No. 14 Penn State	13	–	3	.813	24	–	8	.750
No. 20 Michigan State	13	–	3	.813	23	–	10	.697
No. 13 Nebraska †	12	–	4	.750	26	–	7	.788
No. 17 Purdue	11	–	5	.688	22	–	9	.710
No. 19 Iowa	11	–	5	.688	27	–	9	.750
Minnesota	8	–	8	.500	22	–	13	.629
Michigan	8	–	8	.500	20	–	14	.588
Indiana	5	–	11	.313	21	–	13	.618
Northwestern	5	–	11	.313	17	–	16	.515
Ohio State	5	–	11	.313	17	–	18	.486
Wisconsin	3	–	13	.188	10	–	19	.345
Illinois	2	–	14	.125	9	–	21	.300
† 2014 Big Ten tournament winner As of 10:03, 1 April 2014 (UTC); Rankings from AP poll

The 2013–14 Michigan Wolverines women's basketball team represented University of Michigan during the 2013–14 NCAA Division I women's basketball season. The Wolverines, led by second year head coach Kim Barnes Arico, played their home games at the Crisler Center and were members of the Big Ten Conference. They finished with a record of 20–14 overall, 8–8 in Big Ten play for a tie for sixth place. They lost in the quarterfinals in the 2014 Big Ten Conference women's basketball tournament against their in-state rivalry Michigan State. They were invited to the 2014 Women's National Invitation Tournament, where they defeated Stony Brook in the first round, Duquesne in the second round and losing to Bowling Green in the third round.

== Roster ==
2013–14 Michigan Wolverines women's basketball team
Players
Coaches

Pos.	#	Name	Height	Year	Previous school	Hometown
G	1	Madison Ristovski	5 ft 10 in (1.78 m)	So	University Liggett	Sterling Heights, Mich.
G	2	Siera Thompson	5 ft 7 in (1.7 m)	Fr	Serra	Gardena, Calif.
F	3	Kelsey Mitchell	6 ft 0 in (1.83 m)	So	Inkster	Detroit, Mich.
G	5	Shannon Smith	5 ft 7 in (1.7 m)	Jr	Forestview	Gastonia, N.C.
G	14	Nicole Elmblad	5 ft 11 in (1.8 m)	Jr	LaSalle	St. Ignace, Mich.
G	15	Paige Rakers	5 ft 11 in (1.8 m)	Fr	Carlyle	Carlyle, Ill.
G	20	Danielle Williams	5 ft 9 in (1.75 m)	Fr	St. Mary's	Phoenix, Ariz.
F	21	Nicole Flyer (W)	6 ft 2 in (1.88 m)	Jr	Palisades	Los Angeles, Calif.
F	22	Cyesha Goree	6 ft 3 in (1.91 m)	Jr	Wyoming Park	Grand Rapids, Mich.
G	23	Hallie Wangler (W)	5 ft 9 in (1.75 m)	RS So	Shrine Catholic	Royal Oak, Mich.
F	32	Rebecca Lyttle	6 ft 0 in (1.83 m)	So	Hollywood Christian	Miramar, Fla.
F/C	34	Val Driscoll	6 ft 4 in (1.93 m)	Sr	Archbishop Williams	Stoughton, Mass.
F/C	54	Kendra Seto	6 ft 1 in (1.85 m)	RS Sr	Eastdale C.V.I	Oshawa, Ontario

Head coach

Kim Barnes Arico

Assistant coach(es)

Melanie Moore
Chester Nichols
Joy McCorvey

Legend

- (C) Team captain
- (S) Suspended
- (I) Ineligible
- (W) Walk-on
- Injured
- Current redshirt

Roster
Last update: 2013-08-15

== Schedule ==
Date time, TV	Rank^{#}	Opponent^{#}	Result	Record	Site (attendance) city, state
Exhibition
11/01/2013*; 7:00 pm		Wayne State	W 81–55	–	Crisler Center (1,104); Ann Arbor, MI
Regular Season
11/08/2013*; 4:00 pm		vs. Bowling Green; Iona Tournament semifinals	L 52–63	0–1	Hynes Athletic Center (N/A); New Rochelle, NY
11/09/2013*; 1:00 pm		vs. Arizona; Iona Tournament 3rd place game	W 73–71 ^{OT}	1–1	Hynes Athletic Center (N/A); New Rochelle, NY
11/13/2013*; 7:00 pm		Xavier	L 75–79 ^{OT}	1–2	Crisler Center (1,190); Ann Arbor, MI
11/16/2013*; 7:00 pm, WADL		at Detroit	W 83–63	2–2	Calihan Hall (2,156); Detroit, MI
11/18/2013*; 5:00 pm		at Western Michigan	W 73–45	3–2	University Arena (1,522); Kalamazoo, MI
11/20/2013*; 7:00 pm		Pittsburgh	W 83–75	4–2	Crisler Center (1,339); Ann Arbor, MI
11/29/2013*; 10:30 am		vs. Texas Tech; Barclays Women's Invitational semifinals	W 82–71	5–2	Barclays Center (N/A); Brooklyn, NY
11/30/2013*; 9:00 pm		vs. No. 15 LSU; Barclays Women's Invitational championship	L 62–64	5–3	Barclays Center (1,012); Brooklyn, NY
12/05/2013*; 7:00 pm		at Virginia; ACC – Big Ten Women's Challenge	W 73–53	6–3	John Paul Jones Arena (3,250); Charlottesville, VA
12/11/2013*; 7:00 pm		Eastern Michigan	W 89–75	7–3	Crisler Center (1,863); Ann Arbor, MI
12/14/2013*; 7:00 pm		No. 4 Notre Dame	L 64–86	7–4	Crisler Center (3,330); Ann Arbor, MI
12/20/2013*; 7:00 pm		Southern	W 83–59	8–4	Crisler Center (1,307); Ann Arbor, MI
12/28/2013*; 2:00 pm		Alcorn State	W 76–31	9–4	Crisler Center (2,168); Ann Arbor, MI
01/05/2014; 5:00 pm, BTN		at Ohio State; Rivalry	W 64–49	10–4 (1–0)	Value City Arena (6,350); Columbus, OH
01/09/2014; 7:00 pm		Wisconsin	W 70–62	11–4 (2–0)	Crisler Center (1,248); Ann Arbor, MI
01/12/2014; 4:30 pm, BTN		Michigan State; Rivalry	L 72–79	11–5 (2–1)	Crisler Center (4,510); Ann Arbor, MI
01/15/2014; 7:00 pm		at No. 22 Purdue	W 65–49	12–5 (3–1)	Mackey Arena (7,536); West Lafayette, IN
01/18/2014; 12:00 pm, BTN		Illinois	W 69–60	13–5 (4–1)	Crisler Center (2,013); Ann Arbor, MI
01/23/2014; 7:00 pm		Ohio State; Rivalry	L 50–61	13–6 (4–2)	Crisler Center (1,646); Ann Arbor, MI
01/26/2014; 1:00 pm		at Wisconsin	W 60–44	14–6 (5–2)	Kohl Center (7,406); Madison, WI
01/29/2014; 8:00 pm		at Nebraska	L 51–84	14–7 (5–3)	Pinnacle Bank Arena (6,297); Lincoln, NE
02/01/2014; 12:00 pm, BTN		Minnesota	L 69–85	14–8 (5–4)	Crisler Center (1,508); Ann Arbor, MI
02/06/2014; 8:00 pm		at Northwestern	W 70–68	15–8 (6–4)	Welsh-Ryan Arena (742); Evanston, IL
02/09/2014; 12:00 pm, BTN		No. 25 Purdue	L 56–65	15–9 (6–5)	Crisler Center (2,428); Ann Arbor, MI
02/13/2014; 7:00 pm		No. 21 Nebraska	L 68–76	15–10 (6–6)	Crisler Center (1,728); Ann Arbor, MI
02/16/2014; 2:00 pm		at Illinois	W 70–63	16–10 (7–6)	State Farm Center (3,018); Champaign, IL
02/19/2014; 7:00 pm		at Indiana	W 70–58	17–10 (8–6)	Assembly Hall (2,254); Bloomington, IN
02/22/2014; 1:30 pm, BTN		Iowa	L 70–74	17–11 (8–7)	Crisler Center (2,332); Ann Arbor, MI
03/01/2014; 3:30 pm, BTN		at No. 8 Penn State	L 62–77	17–12 (8–8)	Bryce Jordan Center (6,494); University Park, PA
2014 Big Ten Conference women's tournament
03/06/2014; 6:30 pm, BTN		vs. Indiana; First Round	W 82–57	18–12	Bankers Life Fieldhouse (N/A); Indianapolis, IN
03/07/2014; 6:30 pm, BTN		vs. No. 19 Michigan State; Quarterfinals	L 58–61	18–13	Bankers Life Fieldhouse (N/A); Indianapolis, IN
2014 WNIT
03/21/2014*; 7:00 pm		Stony Brook; First Round	W 86–48	19–13	Crisler Center (1,175); Ann Arbor, MI
03/24/2014*; 7:00 pm		Duquesne; Second Round	W 68–52	20–13	Crisler Center (1,158); Ann Arbor, MI
03/27/2014*; 7:00 pm		at Bowling Green; Third Round	L 53–63	20–14	Stroh Center (2,403); Bowling Green, OH
*Non-conference game. ^{#}Rankings from AP Poll. (#) Tournament seedings in parentheses. All times are in Eastern Time.

== See also ==
2013–14 Michigan Wolverines men's basketball team

== Rankings ==
Ranking movement Legend: ██ Increase in ranking. ██ Decrease in ranking. NR = Not ranked. RV = Received votes.
Poll	Pre	Wk 2	Wk 3	Wk 4	Wk 5	Wk 6	Wk 7	Wk 8	Wk 9	Wk 10	Wk 11	Wk 12	Wk 13	Wk 14	Wk 15	Wk 16	Wk 17	Wk 18	Wk 19	Final
AP	NR	NR	NR	NR	NR	NR	NR	NR	NR	NR	RV	RV	RV	RV	RV	NR	NR	NR	NR	NR
Coaches	NR	NR	NR	NR	NR	NR	NR	NR	NR	NR	NR	NR	NR	NR	NR	NR	NR	NR	NR	NR
