= Big Ten women's basketball tournament =

Annual college basketball tournament

Big Ten Conference women's basketball tournament
- Sport: College basketball
- Conference: Big Ten Conference
- Number of teams: 15
- Format: Single-elimination tournament
- Current stadium: Gainbridge Fieldhouse
- Current location: Indianapolis, Indiana
- Played: 1995–present
- Last contest: 2026
- Current champion: UCLA Bruins
- Most championships: Purdue Boilermakers (9)
- TV partner(s): Peacock (first round); Big Ten Network (second round, quarterfinals and semifinals); CBS (championship)
- Official website: bigten.org Women's Basketball

The Big Ten women's basketball tournament is held annually at the end of the women's college basketball regular season in the United States. The tournament has been played each year since 1995. The winner of the tournament is designated the Big Ten Tournament Champion, and receives the conference's automatic bid to the NCAA women's basketball tournament. The tournament is typically held the first week of March with games played Wednesday through Sunday.

The Big Ten did not begin sponsoring women's basketball until the 1982–83 basketball season. In February 1982 during the 1981–82 season, the conference held a tournament at Michigan State in which Ohio State defeated Illinois 69–66 in the championship game. The conference has listed this in some publications as a regular season championship.

Maryland and Rutgers joined the Big Ten Conference for the 2014–15 season, bringing the conference to 14 teams. The 2015 Big Ten Conference tournament was the first for each school, with Maryland winning its first tournament title in its debut season.

The Big Ten expanded to 18 teams for the 2024–25 season with the arrival of Oregon, UCLA, USC, and Washington.

Originally, Big Ten Network broadcast the first round, second round, quarterfinals and semifinals of the tournament, with the championship game on the ESPN family of networks. Starting in 2024, the first round will air on Peacock and the final will air on CBS.

== Results ==
Year	Champion	Score	Runner-up	Most Outstanding Player	Location
1995	Penn State	68–63	Ohio State	Missy Masley, Penn State	Hinkle Fieldhouse, Indianapolis, Indiana
1996	Penn State	71–69	Purdue	Angie Potthoff, Penn State	Hinkle Fieldhouse, Indianapolis, Indiana
1997	Iowa	63–56	Illinois	Angela Hamblin, Iowa	RCA Dome, Indianapolis, Indiana
1998	Purdue	59–49	Penn State	Andrea Garner, Penn State	RCA Dome, Indianapolis, Indiana
1999	Purdue	80–76	Illinois	Stephanie White, Purdue	RCA Dome, Indianapolis, Indiana
2000	Purdue	71–63	Penn State	Helen Darling, Penn State	Conseco Fieldhouse, Indianapolis, Indiana
2001	Iowa	75–70	Purdue	Cara Consuegra, Iowa	Van Andel Arena, Grand Rapids, Michigan
2002	Indiana	75–72	Penn State	Heather Cassady, Indiana	Conseco Fieldhouse, Indianapolis, Indiana
2003	Purdue	67–65	Ohio State	Shereka Wright, Purdue	Conseco Fieldhouse, Indianapolis, Indiana
2004	Purdue	59–58	Penn State	Shereka Wright, Purdue	Conseco Fieldhouse, Indianapolis, Indiana
2005	Michigan State	55–49	Minnesota	Kristin Haynie, Michigan State	Conseco Fieldhouse, Indianapolis, Indiana
2006	Ohio State	63–60	Purdue	Brandie Hoskins, Ohio State	Conseco Fieldhouse, Indianapolis, Indiana
2007	Purdue	64–52	Ohio State	Katie Gearlds, Purdue	Conseco Fieldhouse, Indianapolis, Indiana
2008	Purdue	58–56	Illinois	FahKara Malone, Purdue	Conseco Fieldhouse, Indianapolis, Indiana
2009	Ohio State	67–66	Purdue	Jantel Lavender, Ohio State	Conseco Fieldhouse, Indianapolis, Indiana
2010	Ohio State	66–64	Iowa	Jantel Lavender, Ohio State	Conseco Fieldhouse, Indianapolis, Indiana
2011	Ohio State	84–70	Penn State	Jantel Lavender, Ohio State	Conseco Fieldhouse, Indianapolis, Indiana
2012	Purdue	74–70	Nebraska	Brittany Rayburn, Purdue	Bankers Life Fieldhouse, Indianapolis, Indiana
2013	Purdue	62–47	Michigan State	Drey Mingo, Purdue	Sears Centre, Hoffman Estates, Illinois
2014	Nebraska	72–65	Iowa	Rachel Theriot, Nebraska	Bankers Life Fieldhouse, Indianapolis, Indiana
2015	Maryland	77–74	Ohio State	Lexie Brown, Maryland	Sears Centre, Hoffman Estates, Illinois
2016	Maryland	60–44	Michigan State	Shatori Walker-Kimbrough, Maryland	Bankers Life Fieldhouse, Indianapolis, Indiana
2017	Maryland	74–64	Purdue	Brionna Jones, Maryland	Bankers Life Fieldhouse, Indianapolis, Indiana
2018	Ohio State	79–69	Maryland	Kelsey Mitchell, Ohio State	Bankers Life Fieldhouse, Indianapolis, Indiana
2019	Iowa	90–76	Maryland	Megan Gustafson, Iowa	Bankers Life Fieldhouse, Indianapolis, Indiana
2020	Maryland	82–65	Ohio State	Ashley Owusu, Maryland	Bankers Life Fieldhouse, Indianapolis, Indiana
2021	Maryland	104–84	Iowa	Diamond Miller, Maryland	Bankers Life Fieldhouse, Indianapolis, Indiana
2022	Iowa	74–67	Indiana	Caitlin Clark, Iowa	Gainbridge Fieldhouse, Indianapolis, Indiana
2023	Iowa	105–72	Ohio State	Caitlin Clark, Iowa	Target Center, Minneapolis, Minnesota
2024	Iowa	94–89^{OT}	Nebraska	Caitlin Clark, Iowa	Target Center, Minneapolis, Minnesota
2025	UCLA	72–67	USC	Lauren Betts, UCLA	Gainbridge Fieldhouse, Indianapolis, Indiana
2026	UCLA	96–45	Iowa	Kiki Rice, UCLA	Gainbridge Fieldhouse, Indianapolis, Indiana
2027					T-Mobile Arena, Las Vegas, Nevada
2028					Little Caesars Arena, Detroit, Michigan

== Championship game results by school ==
Appearances	School	Wins	Losses	Last Championship	Last Appearance
3	Illinois	0	3	N/A	2008
2	Indiana	1	1	2002	2022
10	Iowa	6	4	2024	2026
7	Maryland	5	2	2021	2021
3	Michigan State	1	2	2005	2016
1	Minnesota	0	1	N/A	2005
3	Nebraska	1	2	2014	2024
11	Ohio State	5	6	2018	2023
7	Penn State	2	5	1996	2011
14	Purdue	9	5	2013	2017
2	UCLA	2	0	2026	2026
1	USC	0	1	N/A	2025

- Michigan, Northwestern, Oregon, Rutgers, Washington and Wisconsin have not made an appearance in a championship game.
- Ohio State's 2018 championship was later vacated by the NCAA due to sanctions imposed for impermissible benefits provided by an assistant coach.

== See also ==
- Big Ten Conference Men's Basketball regular season champions
- Big Ten men's basketball tournament
- Big Ten Conference Women's Basketball regular season champions
