= 2013–14 Indiana Hoosiers women's basketball team =

Intercollegiate basketball season

2013–14 Indiana Hoosiers women's basketball

WNIT, Quarterfinals
- Conference: Big Ten Conference
- Record: 21–13 (5–11 Big Ten)
- Head coach: Curt Miller (2nd season)
- Assistant coaches: Brandi Poole; Kevin Eckert; Jimmy Colloton
- Home arena: Assembly Hall

2013–14 Big Ten women's basketball standings
	Conf.				Overall
Team	W		L	PCT	W		L	PCT
No. 14 Penn State	13	–	3	.813	24	–	8	.750
No. 20 Michigan State	13	–	3	.813	23	–	10	.697
No. 13 Nebraska †	12	–	4	.750	26	–	7	.788
No. 17 Purdue	11	–	5	.688	22	–	9	.710
No. 19 Iowa	11	–	5	.688	27	–	9	.750
Minnesota	8	–	8	.500	22	–	13	.629
Michigan	8	–	8	.500	20	–	14	.588
Indiana	5	–	11	.313	21	–	13	.618
Northwestern	5	–	11	.313	17	–	16	.515
Ohio State	5	–	11	.313	17	–	18	.486
Wisconsin	3	–	13	.188	10	–	19	.345
Illinois	2	–	14	.125	9	–	21	.300
† 2014 Big Ten tournament winner As of 10:03, 1 April 2014 (UTC); Rankings from AP poll

The 2013–14 Indiana Hoosiers women's basketball team represented Indiana University Bloomington during the 2013–14 NCAA Division I women's basketball season. The Hoosiers, led by second-year head coach Curt Miller, played their home games at Assembly Hall and were members of the Big Ten Conference. They finished the season 21–13 overall, 5–11 in Big Ten play to finish in a tie for eighth place. They lost in the first round of the 2014 Big Ten Conference women's basketball tournament to Michigan. They were invited to the 2014 Women's National Invitation Tournament, where they defeated Belmont in the first round, Marquette in the second round, and Northwestern in the third round, before losing to South Dakota State in the quarterfinals.

== Roster ==
#	Name	Height	Position	Class	Hometown
5	Larryn Brooks	5'5"	G	Freshman	Richmond, KY
10	Taylor Agler	5'9"	G	Freshman	Westerville, OH
11	Andrea Newbauer	5'9"	G	Senior	Fort Wayne, IN
12	Nicole Bell	5'4"	G	Sophomore	Cincinnati, OH
14	Tabitha Gerardot	6'1"	F	Senior	Fort Wayne, IN
15	Kaila Hulls	5'11"	G/F	RS sophomore	Bloomington, IN
20	Lizzy Pedigo	5'8"	G	Freshman	Indianapolis, IN
22	Sasha Chaplin	6'4"	C	GS Senior	St. Petersburg, FL
23	Alexis Gassion	5'10"	G	Freshman	Fairborn, OH
24	Karlee McBride	5'10"	G	Freshman	Erie, PA
32	Andrea Mize	5'9"	G	Junior	Greenwood, IN
34	Claire Jakubicek	6'0"	F	RS sophomore	Cary, IL
40	Lyndsay Leikem	6'1"	F	Sophomore	Tucson, AZ
43	Jenn Anderson	6'3"	C	Freshman	Sheridan, IN
44	Simone Deloach	6'3"	C	Senior	Round Rock, TX
55	Milika Taufa	6'0"	F	Senior	Lahaina, HI

== Schedule ==
Date time, TV	Rank^{#}	Opponent^{#}	Result	Record	Site (attendance) city, state
Exhibition
10/29/2013*; 7:00 pm		Georgetown (KY)	W 79–55	–	Assembly Hall (1,287); Bloomington, IN
Regular season
11/09/2013*; 7:00 pm		Oakland	W 85–55	1–0	Assembly Hall (2,485); Bloomington, IN
11/12/2013*; 7:00 pm		at IPFW	W 85–80	2–0	Hilliard Gates Sports Center (1,085); Fort Wayne, IN
11/15/2013*; 7:05 pm		at Indiana State	W 57–54	3–0	Hulman Center (2,781); Terre Haute, IN
11/18/2013*; 7:00 pm		Central Arkansas	W 80–53	4–0	Assembly Hall (1,711); Bloomington, IN
11/23/2013*; 2:00 pm		Butler	W 84–69	5–0	Assembly Hall (2,505); Bloomington, IN
11/25/2013*; 7:00 pm		Saint Louis	W 85–69	6–0	Assembly Hall (1,810); Bloomington, IN
12/01/2013*; 2:00 pm		USC Upstate	W 87–38	7–0	Assembly Hall (2,432); Bloomington, IN
12/04/2013*; 7:00 pm		Virginia Tech; ACC – Big Ten Women's Challenge	W 71–65	8–0	Assembly Hall (2,210); Bloomington, IN
12/08/2013*; 2:00 pm		at Morehead State	W 77–54	9–0	Ellis Johnson Arena (692); Morehead, KY
12/11/2013*; 7:00 pm		Milwaukee	W 87–68	10–0	Assembly Hall (1,891); Bloomington, IN
12/15/2013*; 2:00 pm		at IUPUI	W 51–45	11–0	The Jungle (647); Indianapolis, IN
12/21/2013*; 2:00 pm		at Cleveland State	W 107–73	12–0	Wolstein Center (485); Cleveland, OH
12/29/2013*; 2:00 pm		at Xavier	W 62–55	13–0	Cintas Center (1,274); Cincinnati, OH
01/02/2014; 7:00 pm		No. 22 Iowa	W 86–84	14–0 (1–0)	Assembly Hall (2,888); Bloomington, IN
01/11/2014; 4:30 pm, BTN	No. 22	Ohio State	L 51–70	14–1 (1–1)	Assembly Hall (4,139); Bloomington, IN
01/15/2014; 4:30 pm		at Wisconsin	L 60–65	14–2 (1–2)	Kohl Center (3,217); Madison, WI
01/17/2014; 7:00 pm		at No. 22 Purdue; Rivalry/Crimson and Gold Cup	L 53–86	14–3 (1–3)	Mackey Arena (8,698); West Lafayette, IN
01/19/2014; 2:00 pm		Minnesota	W 83–78 ^{OT}	15–3 (2–3)	Assembly Hall (4,532); Bloomington, IN
01/22/2014; 7:00 pm		at No. 13 Penn State	L 52–65	15–4 (2–4)	Bryce Jordan Center (4,828); University Park, PA
01/25/2014; 7:00 pm, BTN		at Iowa	L 75–84	15–5 (2–5)	Carver–Hawkeye Arena (7,180); Iowa City, IA
01/30/2014; 7:00 pm		Northwestern	L 52–58	15–6 (2–6)	Assembly Hall (3,162); Bloomington, IN
02/02/2014; 7:00 pm		at Illinois	W 77–58	16–6 (3–6)	State Farm Center (1,914); Champaign, IL
02/08/2014; 1:00 pm, BTN		Wisconsin	W 76–69	17–6 (4–6)	Assembly Hall (3,570); Bloomington, IN
02/13/2014; 7:00 pm		No. 11 Penn State	L 63–71	17–7 (4–7)	Assembly Hall (2,115); Bloomington, IN
02/16/2014; 1:00 pm, BTN		at No. 21 Nebraska	L 61–76	17–8 (4–8)	Pinnacle Bank Arena (8,165); Lincoln, NE
02/19/2014; 7:00 pm		Michigan	L 58–70	17–9 (4–9)	Assembly Hall (2,254); Bloomington, IN
02/22/2014; 3:30 pm, BTN		Illinois	W 79–61	18–9 (5–9)	Assembly Hall (3,481); Bloomington, IN
02/27/2014; 8:00 pm		at Minnesota	L 62–73	18–10 (5–10)	Williams Arena (2,613); Minneapolis, MN
03/02/2014; 6:00 pm, BTN		at No. 21 Michigan State	L 56–76	18–11 (5–11)	Breslin Center (9,837); East Lansing, MI
2014 Big Ten Conference women's basketball tournament
03/06/2014; 6:30 pm, BTN		vs. Michigan; First Round	L 57–82	18–12	Bankers Life Fieldhouse (N/A); Indianapolis, IN
2014 WNIT
03/20/2014*; 7:00 pm		Belmont; First Round	W 48–47	19–12	Assembly Hall (2,302); Bloomington, IN
03/22/2014*; 7:00 pm		Marquette; Second Round	W 72–69	20–12	Assembly Hall (2,469); Bloomington, IN
03/27/2014*; 7:00 pm		Northwestern; Third Round	W 66–65	21–12	Assembly Hall (3,065); Bloomington, IN
03/30/2014*; 3:00 pm		at South Dakota State; Quarterfinals	L 64–76	21–13	Frost Arena (3,792); Brookings, SD
*Non-conference game. ^{#}Rankings from AP Poll. (#) Tournament seedings in parentheses. All times are in Eastern Time.

== See also ==
- 2013–14 Indiana Hoosiers men's basketball team
