= 2013–14 Purdue Boilermakers women's basketball team =

Intercollegiate basketball season

2013–14 Purdue Boilermakers women's basketball

NCAA women's tournament, second round
- Conference: Big Ten Conference

Ranking
- Coaches: No. 19
- AP: No. 17
- Record: 22–9 (11–5 Big Ten)
- Head coach: Sharon Versyp (8th season)
- Assistant coaches: Nadine Morgan; Christy Smith; Lindsay Wisdom-Hylton
- Home arena: Mackey Arena

2013–14 Big Ten women's basketball standings
	Conf.				Overall
Team	W		L	PCT	W		L	PCT
No. 14 Penn State	13	–	3	.813	24	–	8	.750
No. 20 Michigan State	13	–	3	.813	23	–	10	.697
No. 13 Nebraska †	12	–	4	.750	26	–	7	.788
No. 17 Purdue	11	–	5	.688	22	–	9	.710
No. 19 Iowa	11	–	5	.688	27	–	9	.750
Minnesota	8	–	8	.500	22	–	13	.629
Michigan	8	–	8	.500	20	–	14	.588
Indiana	5	–	11	.313	21	–	13	.618
Northwestern	5	–	11	.313	17	–	16	.515
Ohio State	5	–	11	.313	17	–	18	.486
Wisconsin	3	–	13	.188	10	–	19	.345
Illinois	2	–	14	.125	9	–	21	.300
† 2014 Big Ten tournament winner As of 10:03, 1 April 2014 (UTC); Rankings from AP poll

The 2013–14 Purdue Boilermakers women's basketball team represented Purdue Boilermakers during the 2013–14 NCAA Division I women's basketball season. The Boilermakers, led by eighth-year head coach Sharon Versyp, played their home games at the Mackey Arena and were members of the Big Ten Conference. They finished with a record of 22–9 overall, 11–5 overall to finish in a tie for fourth place. They lost in the quarterfinals of the 2014 Big Ten Conference women's basketball tournament to Iowa. They were invited to the 2014 NCAA Division I women's basketball tournament, where they defeated Akron in the first round before losing to Oklahoma State in the second round.

== Roster ==
2013–14 Purdue Boilermakers women's basketball team
Players
Coaches

Pos.	#	Name	Height	Year	Previous school	Hometown
F	52	Whitney Bays	6 ft 2 in (1.88 m)	Jr	Huntington	Huntington, W.Va.
F	23	Liza Clemons	6 ft 2 in (1.88 m)	So	Snider/Elmhurst	Fort Wayne, Ind.
G	10	Hayden Hamby	5 ft 7 in (1.7 m)	Fr	West Morgan	Trinity, Ala.
G	22	KK Houser	5 ft 6 in (1.68 m)	RS Jr	Lincoln Southeast	Lincoln, Neb.
F	50	Taylor Manuel	6 ft 2 in (1.88 m)	Fr	Incarnate Word Academy	St, Louis, Mo.
F	21	Joslyn Massey	6 ft 0 in (1.83 m)	Fr	John Glenn	Detroit, Mich.
F	24	Drey Mingo	6 ft 2 in (1.88 m)	GS	Marist	Atlanta, Ga.
G	15	Courtney Moses	5 ft 6 in (1.68 m)	Jr	Oak Hill	Sweetser, Ind.
F	32	Sam Ostarello	6 ft 2 in (1.88 m)	Sr	Stanley County	Ft. Pierre, S.D.
G	43	Chantel Poston	5 ft 10 in (1.78 m)	RS Sr	Milan	Milan, Tenn.
F/C	42	Camille Redmon	6 ft 4 in (1.93 m)	RS So	Mansfield Timberview	Grand Prairie, Texas
G	4	Torrie Thornton	6 ft 0 in (1.83 m)	So	Carmel	Carmel, Ind.
G	20	Dee Dee Williams	6 ft 0 in (1.83 m)	Jr	Ben Davis	Indianapolis, Ind.
G	25	April Wilson	5 ft 7 in (1.7 m)	Fr	Manual	Louisville, Ky.

Head coach

Sharon Versyp

Assistant coach(es)

Nadine Morgan
Christy Smith
Lindsay Wisdom-Hylton

Legend

- (C) Team captain
- (S) Suspended
- (I) Ineligible
- (W) Walk-on
- Injured
- Current redshirt

Roster
Last update: 2013-08-16

== Schedule ==
Date time, TV	Rank^{#}	Opponent^{#}	Result	Record	Site (attendance) city, state
Exhibition
11/03/2013*; 2:00 pm	No. 18	Clark	W 102–33	–	Mackey Arena (7,670); West Lafayette, IN
Regular season
11/10/2013*; 7:00 pm	No. 18	Ball State	W 63–57	1–0	Mackey Arena (8,091); West Lafayette, IN
11/13/2013*; 7:00 pm	No. 18	at IUPUI	W 76–56	2–0	The Jungle (1,215); Indianapolis, IN
11/17/2013*; 2:00 pm	No. 18	at Toledo	W 81–79	3–0	Savage Arena (4,012); Toledo, OH
11/22/2013*; 5:30 pm	No. 18	Belmont	W 76–46	4–0	Mackey Arena (7,531); West Lafayette, IN
11/26/2013*; 5:00 pm	No. 16	vs. No. 6 Stanford; Hardwood Tournament of Hope	L 69–86	4–1	Puerto Vallarta International Convention Center (100); Puerto Vallarta, MX
11/28/2013*; 7:30 pm	No. 16	vs. TCU; Hardwood Tournament of Hope	W 75–68	5–1	Puerto Vallarta International Convention Center (75); Puerto Vallarta, MX
12/05/2013*; 6:30 pm	No. 16	at No. 2 Duke; ACC – Big Ten Women's Challenge	L 78–99	5–2	Cameron Indoor Stadium (3,758); Durham, NC
12/08/2013*; 2:00 pm	No. 16	IPFW	W 91–70	6–2	Mackey Arena (7,476); West Lafayette, IN
12/15/2013*; 3:00 pm	No. 18	at Kansas	W 71–68	7–2	Allen Fieldhouse (1,495); Lawrence, KS
12/18/2013*; 8:00 pm	No. 18	at Green Bay	W 49–45	8–2	Kress Events Center (2,128); Green Bay, WI
12/22/2013*; 12:00 pm	No. 18	Bowling Green	W 57–48	9–2	Mackey Arena (7,794); West Lafayette, IN
12/28/2013*; 2:00 pm	No. 17	Central Michigan	W 109–97	10–2	Mackey Arena (8,144); West Lafayette, IN
01/02/2014; 7:00 pm	No. 17	at Ohio State	L 78–89	10–3 (0–1)	Value City Arena (4,961); Columbus, OH
01/09/2014; 8:00 pm	No. 21	at Northwestern	L 68–71	10–4 (0–2)	Welsh-Ryan Arena (491); Evanston, IL
01/12/2014; 2:00 pm, ESPN	No. 21	at No. 14 Penn State	W 84–74	11–4 (1–2)	Bryce Jordan Center (4,853); University Park, PA
01/15/2014; 7:00 pm	No. 22	Michigan	L 49–65	11–5 (1–3)	Mackey Arena (7,536); West Lafayette, IN
01/17/2014; 7:00 pm	No. 22	Indiana; Rivalry/Crimson and Gold Cup	W 86–53	12–5 (2–3)	Mackey Arena (8,698); West Lafayette, IN
01/19/2014; 5:00 pm, BTN	No. 22	at No. 18 Nebraska	W 77–75	13–5 (3–3)	Pinnacle Bank Arena (6,196); Lincoln, NE
01/23/2014; 7:00 pm, BTN	No. 22	Northwestern	W 90–65	14–5 (4–3)	Mackey Arena (7,455); West Lafayette, IN
01/27/2014; 7:00 pm, BTN	No. 19	at Illinois	W 80–68	15–5 (5–3)	State Farm Center (1,554); Champaign, IL
01/30/2014; 6:00 pm, BTN	No. 19	No. 12 Penn State	L 72–75	15–6 (5–4)	Mackey Arena (7,785); West Lafayette, IN
02/02/2014; 1:30 pm, BTN	No. 19	at Michigan State	L 73–89	15–7 (5–5)	Breslin Center (13,172); East Lansing, MI
02/06/2014; 7:00 pm	No. 25	Ohio State	W 74–58	16–7 (6–5)	Mackey Arena (7,504); West Lafayette, IN
02/09/2014; 12:00 pm, BTN	No. 25	at Michigan	W 65–56	17–7 (7–5)	Crisler Center (2,428); Ann Arbor, MI
02/16/2014; 2:00 pm	No. 23	Iowa	W 74–73	18–7 (8–5)	Mackey Arena (8,813); West Lafayette, IN
02/20/2014; 8:00 pm	No. 21	at Minnesota	W 63–42	19–7 (9–5)	Williams Arena (2,690); Minneapolis, MN
02/23/2014; 2:00 pm, BTN	No. 21	Wisconsin	W 72–54	20–7 (10–5)	Mackey Arena (8,267); West Lafayette, IN
03/02/2014; 2:00 pm, ESPN2	No. 19	No. 16 Nebraska	W 83–66	21–7 (11–5)	Mackey Arena (9,306); West Lafayette, IN
2014 Big Ten Conference women's basketball tournament
03/07/2014; 2:30 pm, BTN	No. 17	vs. No. 23 Iowa; Quarterfinals	L 80–87	21–8	Bankers Life Fieldhouse (N/A); Indianapolis, IN
NCAA women's tournament
03/22/2014*; 1:30 pm, ESPN2	No. 17	Akron; First Round	W 84–55	22–8	Mackey Arena (3,342); West Lafayette, IN
03/22/2014*; 9:00 pm, ESPN2	No. 17	No. 21 Oklahoma State; Second Round	L 66–73	22–9	Mackey Arena (3,083); West Lafayette, IN
*Non-conference game. ^{#}Rankings from AP Poll. (#) Tournament seedings in parentheses. All times are in Eastern Time.

== Rankings ==
Ranking movement Legend: ██ Increase in ranking. ██ Decrease in ranking. NR = Not ranked. RV = Received votes.
Poll	Pre	Wk 2	Wk 3	Wk 4	Wk 5	Wk 6	Wk 7	Wk 8	Wk 9	Wk 10	Wk 11	Wk 12	Wk 13	Wk 14	Wk 15	Wk 16	Wk 17	Wk 18	Wk 19	Final
AP	18	18	18	16	16	18	18	19	17	21	22	22	19	25	23	21	19	17	17	17
Coaches	23	22	22	22	22	23	21	17	19	20	19	20	16	24	23	21	19	16	19	19

== See also ==
- 2013–14 Purdue Boilermakers men's basketball team
