= 2013–14 Northwestern Wildcats women's basketball team =

Intercollegiate basketball season

2013–14 Northwestern Wildcats women's basketball

WNIT, Third Round
- Conference: Big Ten Conference
- Record: 17–16 (5–11 Big Ten)
- Head coach: Joe McKeown (6th season)
- Assistant coaches: Dr. Sam Dixon; Allison Guth; Carrie Banks
- Home arena: Welsh-Ryan Arena

2013–14 Big Ten women's basketball standings
	Conf.				Overall
Team	W		L	PCT	W		L	PCT
No. 14 Penn State	13	–	3	.813	24	–	8	.750
No. 20 Michigan State	13	–	3	.813	23	–	10	.697
No. 13 Nebraska †	12	–	4	.750	26	–	7	.788
No. 17 Purdue	11	–	5	.688	22	–	9	.710
No. 19 Iowa	11	–	5	.688	27	–	9	.750
Minnesota	8	–	8	.500	22	–	13	.629
Michigan	8	–	8	.500	20	–	14	.588
Indiana	5	–	11	.313	21	–	13	.618
Northwestern	5	–	11	.313	17	–	16	.515
Ohio State	5	–	11	.313	17	–	18	.486
Wisconsin	3	–	13	.188	10	–	19	.345
Illinois	2	–	14	.125	9	–	21	.300
† 2014 Big Ten tournament winner As of 10:03, 1 April 2014 (UTC); Rankings from AP poll

The 2013–14 Northwestern Wildcats women's basketball team represented Northwestern University during the 2013–14 NCAA Division I women's basketball season. The Wildcats, led by sixth year head coach Joe McKeown, played their home games at the Welsh-Ryan Arena and were a member of the Big Ten Conference. They finished the season with a record of 17–16 overall, 5–11 in Big Ten play for a 3-way tie finish for 8th place. They lost in the first round in the 2014 Big Ten Conference women's basketball tournament to Ohio State. They were invited to the 2014 Women's National Invitation Tournament, where they defeated Ball State in the first round, IUPUI in the second round before losing to Indiana in the third round.

== Roster ==
#	Name	Height	Position	Class	Hometown
3	Ashley Deary	5'4"	G	Freshman	Flower Mound, TX
4	Meghan McKeown	5'9"	G	Senior	Fairfax, VA
5	Alex Cohen	6'5"	F	Junior	Bayside, WI
10	Nia Coffey	6'1"	F	Freshman	Minneapolis, MN
11	Lauren Douglas	6'2"	F	Sophomore	Collierville, TN
13	Nof Kedem	5'6"	G	Sophomore	Olesh, Israel
24	Christen Inman	5'10"	G	Freshman	Katy, TX
25	Maggie Lyon	6'1"	G	Sophomore	Wilmette, IL
31	Allie Tuttle	6'4"	F	Freshman	Cary, NC
32	La'Terria Taylor	5'11"	G	Senior	Chicago, IL
33	Devon Brookshire	6'2"	F	Sophomore	Rancho Palos Verdes, CA
42	Karly Roser	5'10"	G	Junior	Hamilton, ON, Canada

== Schedule ==
Date time, TV	Rank^{#}	Opponent^{#}	Result	Record	Site (attendance) city, state
Exhibition
11/06/2013*; 5:00 pm		Lewis	W 98–57	–	Welsh-Ryan Arena (N/A); Evanston, IL
Regular Season
11/10/2013*; 5:00 pm		UIC	W 79–63	1–0	Welsh-Ryan Arena (392); Evanston, IL
11/13/2013*; 6:30 pm		Chicago State	W 64–33	2–0	Welsh-Ryan Arena (375); Evanston, IL
11/17/2013*; 4:00 pm		UNLV	W 57–53	3–0	Welsh-Ryan Arena (573); Evanston, IL
11/20/2013*; 6:30 pm		Hofstra	W 74–57	4–0	Welsh-Ryan Arena (331); Evanston, IL
11/24/2013*; 5:00 pm, P12N		at No. 17 California	L 51–65	4–1	Haas Pavilion (2,049); Berkeley, CA
11/27/2013*; 6:30 pm		Lafayette	W 66–64	5–1	Welsh-Ryan Arena (482); Evanston, IL
12/01/2013*; 6:30 pm		No. 25 DePaul	W 82–79	6–1	Welsh-Ryan Arena (1,201); Evanston, IL
12/05/2013*; 7:00 pm		NC State; ACC – Big Ten Women's Challenge	L 61–76	6–2	Welsh-Ryan Arena (392); Evanston, IL
12/14/2013*; 2:00 pm		at Loyola	W 90–57	7–2	Joseph J. Gentile Arena (618); Chicago, IL
12/16/2013*; 11:00 am		Oral Roberts	W 84–54	8–2	Welsh-Ryan Arena (5,271); Evanston, IL
12/21/2013*; 12:00 pm		IUPUI	W 72–61	9–2	Welsh-Ryan Arena (761); Evanston, IL
12/28/2013*; 3:00 pm		vs. Indiana State; DoubleTree Classic semifinals	L 67–70	9–3	Devlin Fieldhouse (879); New Orleans, LA
12/29/2013*; 1:00 pm		vs. Northeastern; DoubleTree Classic consolation game	W 73–46	10–3	Devlin Fieldhouse (N/A); New Orleans, LA
01/02/2014; 8:00 pm, BTN		at No. 18 Nebraska	L 65–66	10–4 (0–1)	Pinnacle Bank Arena (6,089); Lincoln, NE
01/09/2014; 7:00 pm		No. 21 Purdue	W 71–68	11–4 (1–1)	Walsh-Ryan Arena (491); Evanston, IL
01/12/2014; 2:00 pm		at Minnesota	L 59–94	11–5 (1–2)	Williams Arena (4,482); Minneapolis, MN
01/15/2014; 8:30 pm		Illinois	L 74–76	11–6 (1–3)	Walsh-Ryan Arena (4,125); Evanston, IL
01/18/2014; 2:00 pm		Wisconsin	W 74–58	12–6 (2–3)	Welsh-Ryan Arena (1,516); Evanston, IL
01/23/2014; 7:00 pm, BTN		at No. 22 Purdue	L 65–90	12–7 (2–4)	Mackey Arena (7,455); West Lafayette, IN
01/26/2014; 4:00 pm		No. 21 Nebraska	W 63–59	13–7 (3–4)	Welsh-Ryan Arena (1,287); Evanston, IL
01/30/2014; 6:00 pm		at Indiana	W 58–52	14–7 (4–4)	Assembly Hall (3,162); Bloomington, IN
02/02/2014; 1:00 pm		No. 12 Penn State	L 75–79	14–8 (4–5)	Welsh-Ryan Arena (1,698); Evanston, IL
02/06/2014; 7:00 pm		Michigan	L 68–70	14–9 (4–6)	Welsh-Ryan Arena (742); Evanston, IL
02/10/2014; 6:00 pm, BTN		at Iowa	L 84–90	14–10 (4–7)	Carver-Hawkeye Arena (3,684); Iowa City, IA
02/15/2014; 2:00 pm, BTN		Minnesota	L 64–82	14–11 (4–8)	Welsh-Ryan Arena (1,782); Evanston, IL
02/20/2014; 6:00 pm, BTN		at No. 9 Penn State	L 73–82	14–12 (4–9)	Bryce Jordan Center (3,960); University Park, PA
02/23/2014; 11:00 am, BTN		at Ohio State	L 62–71	14–13 (4–10)	Value City Arena (6,670); Columbus, OH
02/27/2014; 8:00 pm, BTN		No. 21 Michigan State	L 44–75	14–14 (4–11)	Welsh-Ryan Arena (705); Evanston, IL
03/02/2014; 1:00 pm		at Wisconsin	W 77–73 ^{OT}	15–14 (5–11)	Kohl Center (4,191); Madison, WI
2014 Big Ten Conference women's basketball tournament
03/06/2014; 11:00 am, BTN		vs. Ohio State; First Round	L 77–86	15–15	Bankers Life Fieldhouse (N/A); Indianapolis, IN
2014 WNIT
03/20/2014*; 7:00 pm		Ball State; First Round	W 69–65	16–15	Welsh-Ryan Arena (405); Evanston, IL
03/23/2014*; 2:00 pm		IUPUI; Second Round	W 88–52	17–15	Welsh-Ryan Arena (565); Evanston, IL
03/27/2014*; 6:00 pm		at Indiana; Third Round	L 65–66	17–16	Assembly Hall (3,065); Bloomington, IN
*Non-conference game. ^{#}Rankings from AP Poll. (#) Tournament seedings in parentheses. All times are in Central Time.

== See also ==
2013–14 Northwestern Wildcats men's basketball team
