= Bobbie Kelsey =

American basketball coach (born 1972)

Personal information
- Born: December 30, 1972 (age 53) Pontiac, Michigan, U.S.

Career information
- High school: Southwest DeKalb (Decatur, Georgia)
- College: Stanford (1992–1996)
- Coaching career: 1996–present

Career history

Coaching
- 1996–1997: Boise State (asst.)
- 1998–2000: Florida (asst.)
- 2000–2002: Evansville (asst.)
- 2002–2004: Western Carolina (asst.)
- 2004–2007: Virginia Tech (asst.)
- 2007–2011: Stanford (asst.)
- 2011–2016: Wisconsin
- 2017–2018: Los Angeles Sparks (asst.)

Bobbie Natasha Kelsey (born December 30, 1972) is an American former basketball coach for the WNBA. She is formerly the Commissioner of Athletics for Milwaukee Recreation. She was left the district on October 14, 2025 but no formal reason was stated for her departure.

== Career ==
Hired in April 2011, her tenure at the University of Wisconsin ended on March 4, 2016. Her most recent coaching job was an assistant with the Los Angeles Sparks.

She has been an assistant coach for Stanford University, and a four-year player for the Cardinal. Kelsey spent three years as an assistant coach at Virginia Tech before returning to her alma mater prior to the 2007-08 campaign. She has also held assistant coaching positions at Western Carolina, Evansville, Florida, and Boise State. She formally worked as a Conference Commissioner for the Milwaukee City Conference in Milwaukee WI which schedules and administers Game Scheduling, Officials Scheduling for all Milwaukee public high schools sports teams. Kelsey won the 2022 Milwaukee Public Schools Employee Golf League Championship, playing for Team Central Services . In October 2024 she came under fire from the MPS Athletics community for several clerical issues with paperwork. In 2023, incomplete paperwork led to the Riverside High School swim team being unable to compete in their sectional meet for the 2022–23 season. In 2024 the Pulaski and Bay View high school football teams were forced to forfeit multiple games, as well as initially having to serve a two year ban, however that decision was subsequently overturned by the WIAA Board of Control.

== Head coaching record ==
Record table
Season	Team	Overall	Conference	Standing	Postseason
Wisconsin Badgers (Big Ten Conference) (2011–2016)
2011–12	Wisconsin	9–20	5–11	T–9th	
2012–13	Wisconsin	12–19	3–13	11th	
2013–14	Wisconsin	10–19	3–13	11th	
2014–15	Wisconsin	9–20	5–13	11th	
2015–16	Wisconsin	7–22	3–15	13th	
Wisconsin:		47–100 (.320)	19–65 (.226)		
Total:		47–100 (.320)			
