= 2013–14 Minnesota Golden Gophers women's basketball team =

Intercollegiate basketball season

2013–14 Minnesota Golden Gophers women's basketball

WNIT, Third Round
- Conference: Big Ten Conference
- Record: 22–13 (8–8 Big Ten)
- Head coach: Pam Borton
- Assistant coaches: Curtis Loyd; Ted Riverso; Kelly Roysland
- Home arena: Williams Arena

2013–14 Big Ten women's basketball standings
	Conf.				Overall
Team	W		L	PCT	W		L	PCT
No. 14 Penn State	13	–	3	.813	24	–	8	.750
No. 20 Michigan State	13	–	3	.813	23	–	10	.697
No. 13 Nebraska †	12	–	4	.750	26	–	7	.788
No. 17 Purdue	11	–	5	.688	22	–	9	.710
No. 19 Iowa	11	–	5	.688	27	–	9	.750
Minnesota	8	–	8	.500	22	–	13	.629
Michigan	8	–	8	.500	20	–	14	.588
Indiana	5	–	11	.313	21	–	13	.618
Northwestern	5	–	11	.313	17	–	16	.515
Ohio State	5	–	11	.313	17	–	18	.486
Wisconsin	3	–	13	.188	10	–	19	.345
Illinois	2	–	14	.125	9	–	21	.300
† 2014 Big Ten tournament winner As of 10:03, 1 April 2014 (UTC); Rankings from AP poll

The 2013–14 Minnesota Golden Gophers women's basketball team represented the University of Minnesota in the 2013–14 NCAA Division I women's basketball season. Led by 12th year head coach Pam Borton for the Golden Gophers, members of the Big Ten Conference, played their home games at Williams Arena in Minneapolis, Minnesota. They finished with a record of 22–13 overall, 8–8 in Big Ten play for a tie for sixth place. They lost in the quarterfinals in the 2014 Big Ten Conference women's basketball tournament to Nebraska. They were invited to the 2014 Women's National Invitation Tournament, where they defeated Green Bay in the first round, SMU in the second round before losing to South Dakota State in the third round.

== Roster ==
2013–14 Minnesota Golden Gophers women's basketball team
Players
Coaches

Pos.	#	Name	Height	Year	Previous school	Hometown
G	24	Mikayla Bailey	5 ft 9 in (1.75 m)	So	Osseo HS	Maple Grove, Minn.
G	1	Rachel Banham	5 ft 9 in (1.75 m)	Jr	Lakeville North HS	Lakeville, Minn.
G	22	Joanna Hedstrom	6 ft 1 in (1.85 m)	Fr	Minnetonka HS	Minnetonka, Minn.
G/F	20	Kayla Hirt	6 ft 2 in (1.88 m)	So	Bemidji HS	Bemidji, Minn.
F	4	Jackie Johnson	6 ft 2 in (1.88 m)	So	Eden Prairie HS	Eden Prairie, Minn.
G	2	Stabresa McDaniel	5 ft 10 in (1.78 m)	Fr	Skyline HS	Dallas, Texas
G	3	Shayne Mullaney	5 ft 10 in (1.78 m)	So	Eden Prairie HS	Eden Prairie, Minn.
G	21	Sari Noga	5 ft 10 in (1.78 m)	Sr	Parkers Prairie HS	Parkers Prairie, Minn.
F	15	Micaëlla Riché	6 ft 2 in (1.88 m)	Sr	Louis Riel HS	Gloucester, Ontario
C	32	Amanda Zahui B.	6 ft 5 in (1.96 m)	RS Fr	Igelstavikens Gymnasium	Stockholm, Sweden

Head coach

Pam Borton

Assistant coach(es)

Curtis Loyd
Ted Riverso
Kelly Roysland

Legend

- (C) Team captain
- (S) Suspended
- (I) Ineligible
- (W) Walk-on
- Injured
- Current redshirt

Roster
Last update: 2013-08-16

== Schedule and results ==
Date time, TV	Rank^{#}	Opponent^{#}	Result	Record	Site (attendance) city, state
Exhibition
10/29/2013*; 7:00 pm		Winona State	W 82–44	–	Williams Arena (2,168); Minneapolis, MN
11/02/2013*; 2:00 pm		Minnesota State Moorhead	W 69–54	–	Williams Arena (2,547); Minneapolis, MN
Regular season
11/09/2013*; 12:00 pm		at Northern Iowa	W 73–55	1–0	McLeod Center (2,396); Cedar Falls, IA
11/13/2013*; 7:00 pm		Charlotte	W 90–55	2–0	Williams Arena (2,107); Minneapolis, MN
11/16/2013*; 1:05 pm		at Creighton	L 52–63	2–1	D. J. Sokol Arena (802); Omaha, NE
11/20/2013*; 7:00 pm		Kansas	W 70–59	3–1	Williams Arena (3,455); Minneapolis, MN
11/24/2013*; 2:00 pm		Navy	W 62–55	4–1	Williams Arena (2,769); Minneapolis, MN
11/26/2013*; 7:00 pm		Loyola	W 80–36	5–1	Williams Arena (2,368); Minneapolis, MN
11/28/2013*; 6:30 pm		vs. Chattanooga; Rainbow Wahine Showdown	W 63–62	6–2	Stan Sheriff Center (N/A); Honolulu, HI
11/29/2013*; 4:00 pm		vs. Colorado State; Rainbow Wahine Showdown	W 79–55	7–1	Stan Sheriff Center (N/A); Honolulu, HI
11/30/2013*; 9:00 pm		at Hawaii; Rainbow Wahine Showdown	L 71–77 ^{OT}	7–2	Stan Sheriff Center (1,486); Honolulu, HI
12/05/2013*; 8:00 pm, BTN		Miami (FL); ACC – Big Ten Women's Challenge	W 74–67	8–2	Williams Arena (2,158); Minneapolis, MN
12/08/2013*; 2:00 pm		North Dakota	W 46–44	9–2	Williams Arena (3,568); Minneapolis, MN
12/20/2013*; 12:00 pm		UCLA; Subway Classic	L 55–58	9–3	Williams Arena (5,065); Minneapolis, MN
12/22/2013*; 2:00 pm		Auburn; Subway Classic	W 67–54	10–3	Williams Arena (3,139); Minneapolis, MN
12/29/2013*; 2:00 pm		Oakland	W 79–43	11–3	Williams Arena (2,578); Minneapolis, MN
Big Ten regular season
01/04/2014; 2:00 pm		Michigan State	L 56–81	11–4 (0–1)	Williams Arena (3,442); Minneapolis, MN
01/08/2014; 7:00 pm		at Iowa	L 71–78	11–5 (0–2)	Carver–Hawkeye Arena (3,460); Iowa City, IA
01/12/2014; 2:00 pm		Northwestern	W 94–59	12–5 (1–2)	Williams Arena (4,482); Minneapolis, MN
01/16/2014; 8:00 pm, BTN		at No. 18 Nebraska	L 85–88 ^{OT}	12–6 (1–3)	Pinnacle Bank Arena (4,922); Lincoln, NE
01/19/2014; 1:00 pm		at Indiana	L 78–83 ^{OT}	12–7 (1–4)	Assembly Hall (4,532); Bloomington, IN
01/23/2014; 8:00 pm, BTN		Wisconsin	W 64–53	13–7 (2–4)	Williams Arena (2,759); Minneapolis, MN
01/26/2014; 12:00 pm, CBS		at No. 13 Penn State	L 53–83	13–8 (2–5)	Bryce Jordan Center (6,292); University Park, PA
01/29/2014; 7:00 pm		Iowa	L 56–64	13–9 (2–6)	Williams Arena (3,124); Minneapolis, MN
02/01/2014; 11:00 am, BTN		at Michigan	W 85–69	14–9 (3–6)	Crisler Center (1,508); Ann Arbor, MI
02/09/2014; 2:00 pm		Illinois	W 66–61	15–9 (4–6)	Williams Arena (4,306); Minneapolis, MN
02/12/2014; 7:00 pm		at Wisconsin	W 63–50	16–9 (5–6)	Kohl Center (3,659); Madison, WI
02/15/2014; 2:30 pm, BTN		at Northwestern	W 82–64	17–9 (6–6)	Welsh-Ryan Arena (1,782); Evanston, IL
02/20/2014; 7:00 pm		No. 21 Purdue	L 42–63	17–10 (6–7)	Williams Arena (2,690); Minneapolis, MN
02/24/2014; 6:00 pm, BTN		at No. 21 Michigan State	L 61–75	17–11 (6–8)	Breslin Center (5,703); East Lansing, MI
02/27/2014; 7:00 pm		Indiana	W 73–62	18–11 (7–8)	Williams Arena (2,613); Minneapolis, MN
03/02/2014; 1:00 pm		Ohio State	W 74–57	19–11 (8–8)	Williams Arena (3,403); Minneapolis, MN
2014 Big Ten tournament
03/06/2014; 8:00 pm, BTN		vs. Wisconsin; First Round	W 74–68 ^{OT}	20–11	Bankers Life Fieldhouse (6,124); Indianapolis, IN
03/07/2014; 1:30 pm, BTN		vs. No. 16 Nebraska; Quarterfinals	L 67–80	20–12	Bankers Life Fieldhouse (N/A); Indianapolis, IN
2014 WNIT
03/19/2014*; 7:00 pm		Green Bay; First Round	W 62–60	21–12	Williams Arena (950); Minneapolis, MN
03/23/2014*; 5:00 pm		SMU; Second Round	W 77–70	22–12	Williams Arena (587); Minneapolis, MN
03/27/2014*; 7:00 pm		at South Dakota State; Third Round	L 62–70	22–13	Frost Arena (3,320); Brookings, SD
*Non-conference game. ^{#}Rankings from AP Poll. (#) Tournament seedings in parentheses. All times are in Central Time.

== See also ==
- 2013–14 Minnesota Golden Gophers men's basketball team
