= Michigan–Michigan State women's basketball rivalry =

Sports rivalry

- Michigan Wolverines Michigan State Spartans
- Sport: Basketball
- First meeting: February 3, 1973; Michigan State 61, Michigan 24
- Latest meeting: February 15, 2026; Michigan 86, Michigan State 65
- Next meeting: December 29, 2026; Ann Arbor, Michigan

Statistics
- Total meetings: 106
- All-time series: Michigan State leads, 76–28
- Largest victory: Michigan State, 77–34 (2005)
- Longest win streak: Michigan State, 12 (2008–2013)
- Current win streak: Michigan, 3 (2025–present)

Locations of Michigan and Michigan State

The Michigan–Michigan State women's basketball rivalry is a college basketball rivalry between the Michigan Wolverines and Michigan State Spartans women's basketball programs that is part of the larger intrastate rivalry between the University of Michigan and Michigan State University. The rivalry between the Wolverines and Spartans notably includes football, ice hockey, and men's basketball, but extends to almost all sports.

== History ==
As of the end of the 2022–23 season, Michigan State leads the series 76–26, including winning 24 of the first 27 meetings between the two teams. With both teams being in the Big Ten Conference, the teams have met at least once a year since 1973. In February 2020, Michigan completed its first season sweep of the Spartans since the 2014–15 season.

== Accomplishments by the two rivals ==
The following summarizes the accomplishments of the two programs.

Team	Michigan	Michigan State
National titles	0	0
Final Four appearances	0	1
NCAA Tournament appearances	8	17
Big Ten tournament titles	0	1
Big Ten regular season titles	0	4
Big Ten Players of the Year	1	1
All-time program record	561–677	742–480
All-time winning percentage	.453	.607

== Game results ==
=== All-time meetings ===
Michigan victories	Michigan State victories	Tie games	Vacated wins

No.	Date	Location	Winner	Score
1	February 3, 1973	East Lansing, MI	Michigan State	61–24
2	February 13, 1973	Ann Arbor, MI	Michigan State	48–33
3	January 24, 1974	East Lansing, MI	Michigan State	73–35
4	January 22, 1975	Ann Arbor, MI	Michigan State	54–36
5	February 28, 1975	East Lansing, MI	Michigan State	65–53
6	January 20, 1976	East Lansing, MI	Michigan	61–58
7	January 24, 1977	East Lansing, MI	Michigan State	63–62
8	February 14, 1977	Ann Arbor, MI	Michigan State	96–71
9	February 18, 1978	East Lansing, MI	Michigan State	80–47
10	March 2, 1978	Rochester, MI	Michigan State	83–69
11	February 17, 1979	Ann Arbor, MI	Michigan State	78–77
12	March 1, 1979	Rochester, MI	Michigan State	73–66
13	January 15, 1980	East Lansing, MI	Michigan State	70–65
14	January 6, 1981	Ann Arbor, MI	Michigan State	71–69
15	January 5, 1982	East Lansing, MI	Michigan	78–76
16	November 27, 1982	Grand Rapids, MI	Michigan State	80–63
17	February 6, 1983	East Lansing, MI	Michigan State	74–60
18	February 13, 1983	Ann Arbor, MI	Michigan State	77–67
19	February 5, 1984	Ann Arbor, MI	Michigan State	76–63
20	February 12, 1984	East Lansing, MI	Michigan State	68–66
21	January 25, 1985	East Lansing, MI	Michigan State	60–56
22	February 22, 1985	Ann Arbor, MI	Michigan State	77–65
23	January 24, 1986	Ann Arbor, MI	Michigan State	68–62
24	February 23, 1986	East Lansing, MI	Michigan State	75–70
25	January 18, 1987	East Lansing, MI	Michigan State	73–65
26	February 13, 1987	Ann Arbor, MI	Michigan	74–69
27	January 22, 1988	Ann Arbor, MI	Michigan State	66–59
28	February 19, 1988	East Lansing, MI	Michigan State	79–65
29	January 27, 1989	East Lansing, MI	Michigan State	47–45
30	February 24, 1989	Ann Arbor, MI	Michigan	58–48
31	January 28, 1990	Ann Arbor, MI	Michigan	71–65^{OT}
32	February 23, 1990	East Lansing, MI	Michigan	62–56
33	January 4, 1991	East Lansing, MI	Michigan State	68–63
34	March 7, 1991	Ann Arbor, MI	Michigan State	71–62
35	February 7, 1992	East Lansing, MI	Michigan State	76–55
36	March 6, 1992	Ann Arbor, MI	Michigan State	58–52
37	January 13, 1993	Ann Arbor, MI	Michigan State	65–62
38	February 10, 1993	East Lansing, MI	Michigan State	67–63
39	January 12, 1994	East Lansing, MI	Michigan State	74–62
40	February 9, 1994	Ann Arbor, MI	Michigan State	78–62
41	January 6, 1995	Ann Arbor, MI	Michigan	80–75
42	February 19, 1995	East Lansing, MI	Michigan State	70–65
43	March 3, 1995	Indianapolis, IN	Michigan State	81–59
44	January 5, 1996	East Lansing, MI	Michigan State	66–65
45	February 18, 1996	Ann Arbor, MI	Michigan State	87–81
46	January 19, 1997	East Lansing, MI	Michigan State	76–67
47	November 22, 1997	East Lansing, MI	Michigan	89–72
48	January 18, 1998	Ann Arbor, MI	Michigan	81–65
49	January 20, 1999	Ann Arbor, MI	Michigan	76–75^{OT}
50	February 14, 1999	East Lansing, MI	Michigan State	70–56
51	March 14, 1999	Ann Arbor, MI	Michigan State	69–68
52	December 30, 1999	Ann Arbor, MI	Michigan	64–61
53	February 20, 2000	East Lansing, MI	Michigan	90–87^{OT}

No.	Date	Location	Winner	Score
54	January 25, 2001	East Lansing, MI	Michigan	58–49
55	January 2, 2002	Ann Arbor, MI	Michigan	58–45
56	January 30, 2003	East Lansing, MI	Michigan State	73–56
57	February 16, 2003	Ann Arbor, MI	Michigan State	82–55
58	January 18, 2004	East Lansing, MI	No. 25 Michigan State	67–33
59	February 12, 2004	Ann Arbor, MI	No. 17 Michigan State	59–54
60	January 2, 2005	Ann Arbor, MI	No. 10 Michigan State	70–60
61	February 23, 2005	East Lansing, MI	No. 6 Michigan State	77–34
62	January 1, 2006	East Lansing, MI	No. 10 Michigan State	77–44
63	February 23, 2006	Ann Arbor, MI	No. 14 Michigan State	68–42
64	January 18, 2007	Ann Arbor, MI	No. 23 Michigan State	66–48
65	January 13, 2008	Ann Arbor, MI	Michigan	64–55
66	January 31, 2008	East Lansing, MI	Michigan State	61–58
67	March 30, 2008	East Lansing, MI	Michigan State	45–40^{OT}
68	January 15, 2009	Ann Arbor, MI	Michigan State	41–37
69	February 19, 2009	East Lansing, MI	Michigan State	52–27
70	December 31, 2009	East Lansing, MI	Michigan State	86–71
71	February 11, 2010	Ann Arbor, MI	Michigan State	50–45
72	March 5, 2010	Indianapolis, IN	Michigan State	61–50
73	January 9, 2011	Ann Arbor, MI	No. 11 Michigan State	63–56
74	February 13, 2011	East Lansing, MI	No. 11 Michigan State	69–56
75	January 4, 2012	East Lansing, MI	Michigan State	60–55
76	February 5, 2012	Ann Arbor, MI	Michigan State	65–63
77	February 4, 2013	East Lansing, MI	Michigan State	61–46
78	February 16, 2013	Ann Arbor, MI	Michigan	70–69
79	March 8, 2013	Hoffman Estates, IL	Michigan State	62–46
80	January 12, 2014	Ann Arbor, MI	Michigan State	79–72
81	March 7, 2014	Indianapolis, IN	No. 19 Michigan State	61–58
82	January 4, 2015	Ann Arbor, MI	Michigan	74–65
83	February 5, 2015	East Lansing, MI	Michigan	72–59
84	March 5, 2015	Hoffman Estates, IL	Michigan State	69–49
85	February 3, 2016	East Lansing, MI	No. 17 Michigan State	85–64
86	February 19, 2017	Ann Arbor, MI	Michigan State	86–68
87	March 3, 2017	Indianapolis, IN	Michigan State	74–64
88	January 23, 2018	Ann Arbor, MI	Michigan	74–48
89	February 11, 2018	East Lansing, MI	Michigan State	66–61
90	January 27, 2019	Ann Arbor, MI	Michigan State	77–73
91	February 24, 2019	East Lansing, MI	Michigan State	74–64
92	January 5, 2020	Ann Arbor, MI	Michigan	89–69
93	February 23, 2020	East Lansing, MI	Michigan	65–57
94	February 16, 2021	Ann Arbor, MI	No. 11 Michigan	86–82
95	February 10, 2022	East Lansing, MI	Michigan State	63–57
96	February 24, 2022	Ann Arbor, MI	No. 6 Michigan	62–51
97	January 14, 2023	Ann Arbor, MI	No. 17 Michigan	70–55
98	February 5, 2023	East Lansing, MI	No. 18 Michigan	77–67
99	January 27, 2024	East Lansing, MI	Michigan State	82–61
100	February 18, 2024	Ann Arbor, MI	Michigan State	70–66
101	January 25, 2025	Ann Arbor, MI	No. 21 Michigan State	88–58
102	February 9, 2025	East Lansing, MI	Michigan	71–61
103	February 1, 2026	East Lansing, MI	No. 9 Michigan	94–91^{OT}
104	February 15, 2026	Ann Arbor, MI	No. 7 Michigan	86–65
Series: Michigan State leads 76–28
