= Matt Bollant =

American basketball coach (born 1971)

Current position
- Title: Head coach
- Team: Southwest Baptist
- Conference: GLVC
- Record: 0–0 (–)

Biographical details
- Born: March 13, 1971 (age 55)
- Education: Winona State University, B.A., 1994; American InterContinental University, M.A.

Coaching career (HC unless noted)
- 1997–2000: Evansville (assistant)
- 2000–2002: Indiana (assistant)
- 2002–2007: Bryan
- 2007–2012: Green Bay
- 2012–2017: Illinois
- 2017–2024: Eastern Illinois
- 2024–2026: Bryan
- 2026–present: Southwest Baptist

Head coaching record
- Overall: 418–252 (.624)
- Tournaments: 5–4 (NCAA); 3–2 (WNIT)

Accomplishments and honors

Awards
- AAC Coach of the Year (2007); 3× Horizon Coach of the Year (2008, 2009, 2011); Kay Yow National Coach of the Year (2011)

Matthew Mark Bollant (born March 13, 1971) is the head coach for the Southwest Baptist University women's basketball team. Previously, he was the head women's basketball coach at Bryan College, Eastern Illinois University and served as the head women's basketball coach at the University of Illinois, and before that, he served as head coach of the University of Wisconsin-Green Bay Phoenix women's basketball team. In 2011, he led the Phoenix to its first Sweet Sixteen appearance. He came to the Phoenix after his first stint as the head coach at Bryan College for five seasons and as an assistant coach at Indiana and Evansville for two and one seasons, respectively.

== Head coaching record ==
Sources:

- OVC 2017–18 Women's Basketball Standings
- OVC
- Eastern Illinois

Record table
Season	Team	Overall	Conference	Standing	Postseason
Bryan Lions (Appalachian Athletic Conference) (2002–2007)
2002–03	Bryan	29–7	18–4	2nd	NCCAA Mid-East Region Champions
2003–04	Bryan	28–5	20–2	2nd	NAIA
2004–05	Bryan	26–8	19–3	2nd	NCCAA
2005–06	Bryan	26–8	17–3	1st	NAIA Sweet 16
2006–07	Bryan	25–8	16–2	1st	NAIA
Bryan:		134–36 (.788)	90–14 (.865)		
Green Bay Phoenix (Horizon League) (2007–2012)
2007–08	Green Bay	26–6	17–1	1st	WNIT first round
2008–09	Green Bay	29–4	18–0	1st	NCAA first round
2009–10	Green Bay	28–5	15–3	1st	NCAA second round
2010–11	Green Bay	34–2	18–0	1st	NCAA Sweet 16
2011–12	Green Bay	31–2	17–1	1st	NCAA second round
Green Bay:		148–19 (.886)	85–5 (.944)		
Illinois Fighting Illini (Big Ten Conference) (2012–2017)
2012–13	Illinois	19–14	9–7	T-5th	WNIT Quarterfinals
2013–14	Illinois	9–21	2–14	12th	
2014–15	Illinois	15–16	6–12	10th	
2015–16	Illinois	9–21	2–16	14th	
2016–17	Illinois	9–22	3–13	T-11th	
Illinois:		61–94 (.394)	22–62 (.262)		
Eastern Illinois (Ohio Valley Conference) (2017–2024)
2017–18	Eastern Illinois	3–26	2–16	12th	
2018–19	Eastern Illinois	11–18	5–13	T-10th	
2019–20	Eastern Illinois	19–12	12–6	4th	
2020–21	Eastern Illinois	11–15	9–11	8th	
2021–22	Eastern Illinois	16–14	11–7	T-4th	
2022–23	Eastern Illinois	21–8	14–4	2nd	
2023–24	Eastern Illinois	15–18	11–7	T-2nd	
Eastern Illinois:		96–111 (.464)	64–64 (.500)		
Total:		418–252 (.624)			
National champion Postseason invitational champion Conference regular season champion Conference regular season and conference tournament champion Division regular season champion Division regular season and conference tournament champion Conference tournament champion
