= 2013–14 Illinois Fighting Illini women's basketball team =

Intercollegiate basketball season

2013–14 Illinois Fighting Illini women's basketball
- Conference: Big Ten Conference
- Record: 9–21 (2–14 Big Ten)
- Head coach: Matt Bollant (2nd season)
- Assistant coaches: Mike Divilbiss; Tianna Kirkland; LaKale Malone
- Home arena: State Farm Center

2013–14 Big Ten women's basketball standings
	Conf.				Overall
Team	W		L	PCT	W		L	PCT
No. 14 Penn State	13	–	3	.813	24	–	8	.750
No. 20 Michigan State	13	–	3	.813	23	–	10	.697
No. 13 Nebraska †	12	–	4	.750	26	–	7	.788
No. 17 Purdue	11	–	5	.688	22	–	9	.710
No. 19 Iowa	11	–	5	.688	27	–	9	.750
Minnesota	8	–	8	.500	22	–	13	.629
Michigan	8	–	8	.500	20	–	14	.588
Indiana	5	–	11	.313	21	–	13	.618
Northwestern	5	–	11	.313	17	–	16	.515
Ohio State	5	–	11	.313	17	–	18	.486
Wisconsin	3	–	13	.188	10	–	19	.345
Illinois	2	–	14	.125	9	–	21	.300
† 2014 Big Ten tournament winner As of 10:03, 1 April 2014 (UTC); Rankings from AP poll

The 2013–14 Illinois Fighting Illini women's basketball team represented the University of Illinois at Urbana–Champaign during the 2013–14 NCAA Division I women's basketball season. The Fighting Illini, led by 2nd year head coach Matt Bollant, played their home games at the State Farm Center and were members of the Big Ten Conference. They finished with a record of 9–21 overall, 2–14 in Big Ten play for a last place finish. They lost in the first round of the 2014 Big Ten Conference women's basketball tournament to Iowa.

== Roster ==
2013–14 Illinois Fighting Illini women's basketball team
Players
Coaches

Pos.	#	Name	Height	Year	Previous school	Hometown
G	0	Sarah Hartwell	5 ft 10 in (1.78 m)	RS So	Bellarmine Prep/Georgia Tech	Tacoma, Wash.
F	1	Mckenzie Piper	6 ft 0 in (1.83 m)	So	Iowa City West	Iowa City, Iowa
G	2	Taylor Gleason	5 ft 8 in (1.73 m)	Fr	Goodrich	Grand Blanc, Mich.
G/F	3	Taylor Tuck	6 ft 0 in (1.83 m)	Jr	Bolingbrook	Bolingbrook, Ill.
F	4	Sarah Livingston	6 ft 2 in (1.88 m)	Fr	Morton	Morton, Ill.
F	5	Nia Oden	5 ft 10 in (1.78 m)	Jr	Christ The King	Brooklyn, N.Y.
G	12	Ashley McConnell	5 ft 9 in (1.75 m)	Fr	Fremd	Palatine, Ill.
G/F	13	Mikaala Shackelford	5 ft 10 in (1.78 m)	Fr	Hopkins	Plymouth, Minn.
G	15	Kyley Simmons	5 ft 7 in (1.7 m)	Jr	Lewis Central/Missouri	Council Bluffs, Iowa
G	22	Ivory Crawford	5 ft 10 in (1.78 m)	Jr	Proviso East	Chicago, Ill.
G	23	Alexis Smith	5 ft 9 in (1.75 m)	Jr	St. John the Baptist	Medford, N.Y.
G	25	Kennedy Cattenhead	5 ft 10 in (1.78 m)	Fr	Bolingbrook	Bolingbrook, Ill.
F	34	Jacqui Grant	6 ft 3 in (1.91 m)	Fr	Maine South	Park Ridge, Ill.
G	42	Amber Moore	5 ft 11 in (1.8 m)	Sr	Country Day	Detroit, Mich.

Head coach

Matt Bollant

Assistant coach(es)

Mike Divilbiss
Tianna Kirkland
LaKale Malone

Legend

- (C) Team captain
- (S) Suspended
- (I) Ineligible
- (W) Walk-on
- Injured
- Current redshirt

Roster
Last update: 2013-08-16

== Schedule ==
Date time, TV	Rank^{#}	Opponent^{#}	Result	Record	Site (attendance) city, state
Exhibition
11/03/2013*; 1:00 pm		Cardinal Stritch	W 78–49	–	State Farm Center (1,440); Champaign, IL
Regular Season
11/08/2013*; 11:00 am		at Bradley	L 92–98	0–1	Renaissance Coliseum (2,402); Peoria, IL
11/12/2013*; 7:00 pm		Valparaiso	W 87–59	1–1	State Farm Center (1,265); Champaign, IL
11/14/2013*; 7:00 pm		Mississippi Valley State	W 93–70	2–1	State Farm Center (1,272); Champaign, IL
11/17/2013*; 1:00 pm		Alcorn State	W 112–28	3–1	State Farm Center (2,909); Champaign, IL
11/21/2013*; 7:00 pm		Southern Illinois	W 78–43	4–1	State Farm Center (1,459); Champaign, IL
11/28/2013*; 12:00 pm		vs. Arizona State; Cancún Challenge	L 60–84	4–2	Moon Palace Golf & Spa Resort (934); Cancún, MX
11/29/2013*; 12:00 pm		vs. Arkansas State; Cancún Challenge	W 70–54	5–2	Moon Palace Golf & Spa Resort (730); Cancún, MX
11/30/2013*; 2:30 pm		vs. No. 11 North Carolina; Cancún Challenge	L 51–87	5–3	Moon Palace Golf & Spa Resort (934); Cancún, MX
12/04/2013*; 6:00 pm		at Georgia Tech; ACC – Big Ten Women's Challenge	L 69–93	5–4	McCamish Pavilion (670); Atlanta, GA
12/07/2013*; 6:00 pm		at No. 11 Colorado	L 56–79	5–5	Coors Events Center (2,090); Boulder, CO
12/09/2013*; 7:00 pm		Seton Hall	W 71–70	6–5	State Farm Center (1,358); Champaign, IL
12/21/2013*; 2:00 pm		Tennessee–Martin	W 77–62	7–5	State Farm Center (1,514); Champaign, IL
12/28/2013*; 3:00 pm, CSS		at No. 19 Georgia	L 60–82	7–6	Stegeman Coliseum (3,886); Athens, GA
01/03/2014; 7:00 pm, BTN		Wisconsin	L 64–76	7–7 (0–1)	State Farm Center (1,872); Champaign, IL
01/09/2014; 8:00 pm, BTN		No. 14 Penn State	L 76–82	7–8 (0–2)	State Farm Center (1,317); Champaign, IL
01/12/2014; 1:00 pm, BTN		No. 16 Nebraska	L 56–75	7–9 (0–3)	State Farm Center (3,306); Champaign, IL
01/15/2014; 8:30 pm		at Northwestern	W 76–74	8–9 (1–3)	Welsh-Ryan Arena (4,125); Evanston, IL
01/18/2014; 11:00 am, BTN		at Michigan	L 60–69	8–10 (1–4)	Crisler Center (2,013); Ann Arbor, MI
01/23/2014; 6:00 pm		at Michigan State	W 61–51	9–10 (2–4)	Breslin Center (5,360); East Lansing, MI
01/27/2014; 6:00 pm, BTN		No. 19 Purdue	L 68–80	9–11 (2–5)	State Farm Center (1,554); Champaign, IL
01/30/2014; 6:00 pm		at Ohio State	L 64–90	9–12 (2–6)	Value City Arena (4,256); Columbus, OH
02/02/2014; 1:00 pm		Indiana	L 58–77	9–13 (2–7)	State Farm Center (1,914); Champaign, IL
02/05/2014; 7:00 pm		No. 24 Michigan State	L 53–69	9–14 (2–8)	State Farm Center (1,317); Champaign, IL
02/09/2014; 2:00 pm		at Minnesota	L 61–66	9–15 (2–9)	Williams Arena (4,306); Minneapolis, MN
02/13/2014; 8:00 pm, BTN		at Iowa	L 55–69	9–16 (2–10)	Carver-Hawkeye Arena (3,636); Iowa City, IA
02/16/2014; 1:00 pm		Michigan	L 63–70	9–17 (2–11)	State Farm Center (3,018); Champaign, IL
02/22/2014; 2:30 pm, BTN		at Indiana	L 61–79	9–18 (2–12)	Assembly Hall (3,481); Bloomington, IN
02/27/2014; 7:00 pm		at No. 16 Nebraska	L 65–72	9–19 (2–13)	Pinnacle Bank Arena (7,480); Lincoln, NE
03/02/2014; 3:00 pm, BTN		No. 25 Iowa	L 56–81	9–20 (2–14)	State Farm Center (2,201); Champaign, IL
2014 Big Ten Conference women's tournament
03/06/2014; 1:30 pm, BTN		vs. No. 23 Iowa; First Round	L 62–81	9–21	Bankers Life Fieldhouse (5,070); Indianapolis, IN
*Non-conference game. ^{#}Rankings from AP Poll. (#) Tournament seedings in parentheses. All times are in Central Time.

== See also ==
2013–14 Illinois Fighting Illini men's basketball team
