= 2013–14 Wisconsin Badgers women's basketball team =

Intercollegiate basketball season

2013–14 Wisconsin Badgers women's basketball
- Conference: Big Ten Conference
- Record: 10–19 (3–13 Big Ten)
- Head coach: Bobbie Kelsey (3rd season)
- Assistant coaches: Jayme Callahan; Stacy Cantley; Alysiah Bond
- Home arena: Kohl Center

2013–14 Big Ten women's basketball standings
| | Conf. | | | | Overall |
| Team | W | | L | PCT | W | | L | PCT |
|---|---|---|---|---|---|---|---|---|
| No. 14 Penn State | 13 | – | 3 | .813 | 24 | – | 8 | .750 |
| No. 20 Michigan State | 13 | – | 3 | .813 | 23 | – | 10 | .697 |
| No. 13 Nebraska † | 12 | – | 4 | .750 | 26 | – | 7 | .788 |
| No. 17 Purdue | 11 | – | 5 | .688 | 22 | – | 9 | .710 |
| No. 19 Iowa | 11 | – | 5 | .688 | 27 | – | 9 | .750 |
| Minnesota | 8 | – | 8 | .500 | 22 | – | 13 | .629 |
| Michigan | 8 | – | 8 | .500 | 20 | – | 14 | .588 |
| Indiana | 5 | – | 11 | .313 | 21 | – | 13 | .618 |
| Northwestern | 5 | – | 11 | .313 | 17 | – | 16 | .515 |
| Ohio State | 5 | – | 11 | .313 | 17 | – | 18 | .486 |
| Wisconsin | 3 | – | 13 | .188 | 10 | – | 19 | .345 |
| Illinois | 2 | – | 14 | .125 | 9 | – | 21 | .300 |
† 2014 Big Ten tournament winner As of 10:03, 1 April 2014 (UTC); Rankings from AP poll

The 2013–14 Wisconsin Badgers women's basketball team represented University of Wisconsin–Madison during the 2013–14 NCAA Division I women's basketball season. The Badgers, led by 3rd year head coach Bobbie Kelsey, played their home games at the Kohl Center and were members of the Big Ten Conference. They finished with a record of 10–19 overall, 3–13 in Big Ten play for an eleventh-place finish.

== Roster ==
2013–14 Wisconsin Badgers women's basketball team
Players
Coaches

| Pos. | # | Name | Height | Year | Previous school | Hometown |
|---|---|---|---|---|---|---|
| F | 00 | Shannon Malone | 6 ft 1 in (1.85 m) | So | Marcus | Flower Mound, Texas |
| G | 2 | Taylor Wurtz | 6 ft 0 in (1.83 m) | Sr | Ripon | Brandon, Wis. |
| G/F | 3 | AnnMarie Brown | 6 ft 0 in (1.83 m) | Jr | St. Peter | St. Peter, Minn. |
| G | 4 | Nicole Bauman | 5 ft 10 in (1.78 m) | So | Eisenhower | New Berlin, Wis. |
| G | 5 | Morgan Paige | 5 ft 9 in (1.75 m) | Sr | Marion | Marion, Iowa |
| G | 10 | Dakota Whyte | 5 ft 8 in (1.73 m) | So | Notre Dame Catholic | Ajax, Ontario |
| G | 22 | Tessa Cichy | 6 ft 0 in (1.83 m) | So | Hill-Murray (Maplewood, Minn.) | Somerset, Wis. |
| F | 23 | Daria Kryuchkova | 6 ft 3 in (1.91 m) | Sr | Jacksonville College | Moscow, Russia |
| F/C | 24 | Malayna Johnson | 6 ft 4 in (1.93 m) | Fr | Montini Catholic | Bellwood, Ill. |
| F/C | 25 | Michala Johnson | 6 ft 3 in (1.91 m) | RS Jr | Connecticut | Bellwood, Ill. |
| G | 30 | Carly Truesdale | 5 ft 9 in (1.75 m) | Fr | Westbury Christian | San Antonio, Texas |
| F | 32 | Michala Crall | 6 ft 3 in (1.91 m) | Fr | Olathe Northwest | Olathe, Kansas |
| F | 35 | Jacki Gulczynski | 6 ft 1 in (1.85 m) | Jr | Bartlett | Carol Stream, Ill. |
| F/C | 43 | Cassie Rochel | 6 ft 4 in (1.93 m) | Sr | Lakeville North | Lakeville, Minn. |

Head coach

Bobbie Kelsey

Assistant coach(es)

Jayme Callahan
Stacy Cantley
Alysiah Bond

Legend

- (C) Team captain
- (S) Suspended
- (I) Ineligible
- (W) Walk-on
- Injured
- Current redshirt

Roster
Last update: 2013-08-16

== Schedule ==
| Date time, TV | Rank^{#} | Opponent^{#} | Result | Record | Site (attendance) city, state |
Exhibition
| 11/03/2013*; 3:00 pm | | Winona State | W 80–49 | – | Kohl Center (3,479); Madison, WI |
| 11/07/2013*; 2:00 pm | | UW–Stevens Point | W 80–51 | – | Kohl Center (3,209); Madison, WI |
Non-conference regular season
| 11/10/2013*; 2:00 pm | | Drake | W 66–41 | 1–0 | Kohl Center (3,361); Madison, WI |
| 11/14/2013*; 7:00 pm | | at Milwaukee | W 85–60 | 2–0 | Klotsche Center (1,086); Milwaukee, WI |
| 11/17/2013*; 2:00 pm | | Northern Illinois | W 71–51 | 3–0 | Kohl Center (3,689); Madison, WI |
| 11/21/2013*; 7:00 pm | | at Alabama | L 62–70 | 3–1 | Foster Auditorium (1,229); Tuscaloosa, AL |
| 11/29/2013*; 5:00 pm | | vs. Mercer; Vanderbilt Thanksgiving Tournament semifinals | W 77–72 | 4–1 | Memorial Gymnasium (N/A); Nashville, TN |
| 11/30/2013*; 6:30 pm | | at Vanderbilt; Vanderbilt Thanksgiving Tournament championship | L 69–81 | 4–2 | Memorial Gymnasium (4,446); Nashville, TN |
| 12/05/2013*; 7:00 pm | | Boston College; ACC – Big Ten Women's Challenge | W 74–59 | 5–2 | Kohl Center (3,028); Madison, WI |
| 12/07/2013*; 7:00 pm | | at Marquette | W 62–60 | 6–2 | Al McGuire Center (1,856); Milwaukee, WI |
| 12/10/2013*; 7:00 pm | | No. 23 Gonzaga | L 55–70 | 6–3 | Kohl Center (3,043); Madison, WI |
| 12/13/2013*; 9:30 pm, P12N | | at Washington | L 67–80 | 6–4 | Alaska Airlines Arena (1,474); Seattle, WA |
| 12/21/2013*; 5:00 pm | | UIC | L 56–58 | 6–5 | Wisconsin Field House (3,744); Madison, WI |
| 12/30/2013*; 6:00 pm, BTN | | Green Bay | W 65–61 ^{OT} | 7–5 | Kohl Center (4,931); Madison, WI |
Big Ten regular season
| 01/03/2014; 7:00 pm, BTN | | at Illinois | W 76–64 | 8–5 (1–0) | State Farm Center (1,872); Champaign, IL |
| 01/09/2014; 6:00 pm | | at Michigan | L 62–70 | 8–6 (1–1) | Crisler Arena (1,248); Ann Arbor, MI |
| 01/12/2014; 12:00 pm | | Iowa | L 65–82 | 8–7 (1–2) | Kohl Center (5,245); Madison, WI |
| 01/15/2014; 7:00 pm | | Indiana | W 65–60 | 9–7 (2–2) | Kohl Center (3,217); Madison, WI |
| 01/18/2014; 2:00 pm | | at Northwestern | L 58–74 | 9–8 (2–3) | Welsh-Ryan Arena (1,516); Evanston, IL |
| 01/23/2014; 8:00 pm, BTN | | at Minnesota | L 53–64 | 9–9 (2–4) | Williams Arena (2,759); Minneapolis, MN |
| 01/26/2014; 12:00 pm | | Michigan | L 44–60 | 9–10 (2–5) | Kohl Center (7,406); Madison, WI |
| 01/30/2014; 6:00 pm | | at Michigan State | L 67–71 | 9–11 (2–6) | Breslin Center (5,354); East Lansing, MI |
| 02/02/2014; 2:00 pm | | Ohio State | W 82–71 | 10–11 (3–6) | Kohl Center (6,070); Madison, WI |
| 02/05/2014; 7:00 pm | | No. 22 Nebraska | L 70–71 ^{OT} | 10–12 (3–7) | Kohl Center (3,307); Madison, WI |
| 02/08/2014; 7:00 pm, BTN | | at Indiana | L 69–76 | 10–13 (3–8) | Assembly Hall (3,570); Bloomington, IN |
| 02/12/2014; 7:00 pm | | Minnesota | L 50–63 | 10–14 (3–9) | Kohl Center (3,659); Madison, WI |
| 02/16/2014; 12:00 pm, ESPN2 | | at No. 11 Penn State | L 68–78 | 10–15 (3–10) | Bryce Jordan Center (12,585); University Park, PA |
| 02/20/2014; 8:00 pm, BTN | | No. 23 Michigan State | L 66–76 | 10–16 (3–11) | Kohl Center (3,848); Madison, WI |
| 02/23/2014; 1:00 pm, BTN | | at No. 21 Purdue | L 54–72 | 10–17 (3–12) | Mackey Arena (8,267); West Lafayette, IN |
| 03/02/2014; 1:00 pm | | Northwestern | L 73–77 ^{OT} | 10–18 (3–13) | Kohl Center (4,191); Madison, WI |
Big Ten Women's Tournament
| 03/06/2014; 8:00 pm, BTN | | vs. Minnesota; First Round | L 68–74 ^{OT} | 10–19 | Bankers Life Fieldhouse (6,124); Indianapolis, IN |
*Non-conference game. ^{#}Rankings from AP Poll. (#) Tournament seedings in parentheses. All times are in Central Time.

== See also ==
2013–14 Wisconsin Badgers men's basketball team
