= 2013–14 Ohio State Buckeyes women's basketball team =

Intercollegiate basketball season

2013–14 Ohio State Buckeyes women's basketball
- Conference: Big Ten Conference
- Record: 17–18 (5–11 Big Ten)
- Head coach: Kevin McGuff (1st season)
- Assistant coaches: Joy Cheek; Patrick Klein; Mark Mitchell
- Home arena: Value City Arena

2013–14 Big Ten women's basketball standings
	Conf.				Overall
Team	W		L	PCT	W		L	PCT
No. 14 Penn State	13	–	3	.813	24	–	8	.750
No. 20 Michigan State	13	–	3	.813	23	–	10	.697
No. 13 Nebraska †	12	–	4	.750	26	–	7	.788
No. 17 Purdue	11	–	5	.688	22	–	9	.710
No. 19 Iowa	11	–	5	.688	27	–	9	.750
Minnesota	8	–	8	.500	22	–	13	.629
Michigan	8	–	8	.500	20	–	14	.588
Indiana	5	–	11	.313	21	–	13	.618
Northwestern	5	–	11	.313	17	–	16	.515
Ohio State	5	–	11	.313	17	–	18	.486
Wisconsin	3	–	13	.188	10	–	19	.345
Illinois	2	–	14	.125	9	–	21	.300
† 2014 Big Ten tournament winner As of 10:03, 1 April 2014 (UTC); Rankings from AP poll

The 2013–14 Ohio State Buckeyes women's basketball team represented the Ohio State University during the 2013–14 NCAA Division I women's basketball season. The Buckeyes, led by first-year head coach Kevin McGuff, played their home games at Value City Arena and were members of the Big Ten Conference. They finished with a record of 17–18 overall, 5–11 in Big Ten play for a three-way tie finish in 8th place. They lost in the semifinals in the 2014 Big Ten Conference women's basketball tournament to Iowa.

== Roster ==
2013–14 Ohio State Buckeyes women's basketball team
Players
Coaches

Pos.	#	Name	Height	Year	Previous school	Hometown
C	33	Ashley Adams	6 ft 5 in (1.96 m)	Sr	Siloam Springs	Siloam Springs, Ark.
G	14	Ameryst Alston	5 ft 9 in (1.75 m)	So	McKinley	Canton, Ohio
F	1	Kalpana Beach	6 ft 1 in (1.85 m)	RS So	Westlake	Westlake, Ohio
C	21	Lisa Blair	6 ft 6 in (1.98 m)	So	Nazareth Regional	Brooklyn, N.Y.
G	13	Cait Craft	5 ft 8 in (1.73 m)	So	Liberty-Benton	Findlay, Ohio
C	15	Aleksandra Dobranic	6 ft 4 in (1.93 m)	RS Sr	Isidora Sekulic	Novi Sad, Serbia
F	23	Martina Ellerbe	6 ft 2 in (1.88 m)	Sr	Saint Mary's	Teaneck, N.J.
G	31	Raven Ferguson	5 ft 11 in (1.8 m)	Jr	Africentric	Columbus, Ohio
G	11	Shelbi Honeycutt	5 ft 10 in (1.78 m)	Jr	Siloam Springs	Siloam Springs, Ark.
G	12	Maleeka Kynard	5 ft 7 in (1.7 m)	Jr	Start	Toledo, Ohio
C	22	Darryce Moore	6 ft 2 in (1.88 m)	Sr	Boardman	Youngstown, Ohio
G	25	Amy Scullion	6 ft 0 in (1.83 m)	RS Jr	Salem	Salem, Ohio

Head coach

Kevin McGuff

Assistant coach(es)

Joy Cheek
Patrick Klein
Mark Mitchell

Legend

- (C) Team captain
- (S) Suspended
- (I) Ineligible
- (W) Walk-on
- Injured
- Current redshirt

Roster
Last update: 2013-08-16

== Schedule ==
Date time, TV	Rank^{#}	Opponent^{#}	Result	Record	Site (attendance) city, state
Exhibition
11/03/2013*; 1:30 pm		Bellarmine	W 101–48	–	Value City Arena (2,703); Columbus, OH
Regular season
11/08/2013*; 5:30 pm		at West Virginia	W 70–61	1–0	WVU Coliseum (3,513); Morgantown, WV
11/10/2013*; 2:00 pm		Florida Atlantic	W 91–88	2–0	Value City Arena (4,542); Columbus, OH
11/14/2013*; 7:00 pm		VCU	W 83–71	3–0	Value City Arena (4,254); Columbus, OH
11/17/2013*; 2:00 pm		at No. 24 Georgia	L 49–53	3–1	Stegeman Coliseum (3,627); Athens, GA
11/22/2013*; 8:00 pm		Old Dominion; Basketball Hall of Fame Challenge	W 75–60	4–1	Value City Arena (5,335); Columbus, OH
11/23/2013*; 8:00 pm		Marist; Basketball Hall of Fame Challenge	W 62–59	5–1	Value City Arena (4,499); Columbus, OH
11/24/2013*; 3:30 pm		Bowling Green; Basketball Hall of Fame Challenge	L 52–64	5–2	Value City Arena (N/A); Columbus, OH
11/27/2013*; 5:00 pm		Lehigh; Basketball Hall of Fame Challenge	W 93–63	6–2	Value City Arena (4,323); Columbus, OH
12/01/2013*; 5:00 pm, ESPN2		vs. No. 1 Connecticut; Basketball Hall of Fame Challenge	L 49–70	6–3	MassMutual Center (1,134); Springfield, MA
12/04/2013*; 7:00 pm		at No. 8 Maryland; ACC – Big Ten Women's Challenge	L 55–67	6–4	Comcast Center (3,737); College Park, MD
12/08/2013*; 12:00 pm		No. 24 Gonzaga	L 58–59	6–5	Value City Arena (6,409); Columbus, OH
12/13/2013*; 7:00 pm		Army	W 59–56	7–5	Value City Arena (4,183); Columbus, OH
12/15/2013*; 2:00 pm, FSOH		at Cincinnati	L 49–64	7–6	Fifth Third Arena (1,401); Cincinnati, OH
12/17/2013*; 7:00 pm		Tennessee–Martin	W 82–60	8–6	Value City Arena (4,164); Columbus, OH
12/20/2013*; 7:00 pm		Appalachian State	W 52–38	9–6	Value City Arena (5,995); Columbus, OH
12/29/2013*; 12:00 pm		North Carolina Central	W 65–47	10–6	Value City Arena (6,837); Columbus, OH
01/02/2014; 7:00 pm		No. 17 Purdue	W 89–78	11–6 (1–0)	Value City Arena (4,961); Columbus, OH
01/05/2014; 5:00 pm, BTN		Michigan; Rivalry	L 49–64	11–7 (1–1)	Value City Arena (6,350); Columbus, OH
01/11/2014; 4:30 pm, BTN		at No. 22 Indiana	W 70–51	12–7 (2–1)	Assembly Hall (4,139); Bloomington, IN
01/16/2014; 7:00 pm, BTN		at No. 16 Penn State	L 42–66	12–8 (2–2)	Bryce Jordan Center (3,964); University Park, PA
01/19/2014; 3:00 pm, BTN		Iowa	L 74–81	12–9 (2–3)	Value City Arena (7,567); Columbus, OH
01/23/2014; 7:00 pm		at Michigan; Rivalry	W 61–50	13–9 (3–3)	Crisler Center (1,646); Ann Arbor, MI
01/26/2014; 12:30 pm, BTN		Michigan State	L 68–82	13–10 (3–4)	Value City Arena (6,020); Columbus, OH
01/30/2014; 7:00 pm		Illinois	W 90–64	14–10 (4–4)	Value City Arena (4,256); Columbus, OH
02/02/2014; 3:00 pm		at Wisconsin	L 71–82	14–11 (4–5)	Kohl Center (6,070); Madison, WI
02/06/2014; 7:00 pm		at No. 25 Purdue	L 58–74	14–12 (4–6)	Mackey Arena (7,504); West Lafayette, IN
02/09/2014; 2:00 pm, ESPN2		No. 9 Penn State	L 54–74	14–13 (4–7)	Value City Arena (6,591); Columbus, OH
02/15/2014; 5:30 pm, BTN		at No. 25 Michigan State	L 49–70	14–14 (4–8)	Breslin Center (10,626); East Lansing, MI
02/20/2014; 7:00 pm		No. 17 Nebraska	L 59–67	14–15 (4–9)	Value City Arena (4,612); Columbus, OH
02/23/2014; 12:00 pm, BTN		Northwestern	W 71–62	15–15 (5–9)	Value City Arena (6,670); Columbus, OH
02/27/2014; 7:00 pm, BTN		at No. 25 Iowa	L 61–66	15–16 (5–10)	Carver-Hawkeye Arena (3,492); Iowa City, IA
03/02/2014; 2:00 pm		at Minnesota	L 57–74	15–17 (5–11)	Williams Arena (3,403); Minneapolis, MN
2014 Big Ten Conference women's tournament
03/06/2014; 12:00 pm, BTN		vs. Northwestern; First Round	W 86–77	16–17	Bankers Life Fieldhouse (N/A); Indianapolis, IN
03/07/2014; 12:00 pm, BTN		vs. No. 11 Penn State; Quarterfinals	W 99–82	17–17	Bankers Life Fieldhouse (N/A); Indianapolis, IN
03/07/2014; 3:30 pm, BTN		vs. No. 23 Iowa; Semifinals	L 73–77	17–18	Bankers Life Fieldhouse (N/A); Indianapolis, IN
*Non-conference game. ^{#}Rankings from AP Poll. (#) Tournament seedings in parentheses. All times are in Eastern Time.

== See also ==
- 2013–14 Ohio State Buckeyes men's basketball team
