= 2013–14 Michigan State Spartans women's basketball team =

Intercollegiate basketball season

2013–14 Michigan State Spartans women's basketball

Big Ten Regular Season Co-Champions

NCAA Women's Tournament, second round
- Conference: Big Ten Conference

Ranking
- Coaches: No. 24
- AP: No. 20
- Record: 23–10 (13–3 Big Ten)
- Head coach: Suzy Merchant (7th season)
- Assistant coaches: Amaka Agugua; NcKell Copeland; Mark Simons
- Home arena: Breslin Center

2013–14 Big Ten women's basketball standings
	Conf.				Overall
Team	W		L	PCT	W		L	PCT
No. 14 Penn State	13	–	3	.813	24	–	8	.750
No. 20 Michigan State	13	–	3	.813	23	–	10	.697
No. 13 Nebraska †	12	–	4	.750	26	–	7	.788
No. 17 Purdue	11	–	5	.688	22	–	9	.710
No. 19 Iowa	11	–	5	.688	27	–	9	.750
Minnesota	8	–	8	.500	22	–	13	.629
Michigan	8	–	8	.500	20	–	14	.588
Indiana	5	–	11	.313	21	–	13	.618
Northwestern	5	–	11	.313	17	–	16	.515
Ohio State	5	–	11	.313	17	–	18	.486
Wisconsin	3	–	13	.188	10	–	19	.345
Illinois	2	–	14	.125	9	–	21	.300
† 2014 Big Ten tournament winner As of 10:03, 1 April 2014 (UTC); Rankings from AP poll

The 2013–14 Michigan State Spartans women's basketball team represented Michigan State University during the 2013–14 NCAA Division I women's basketball season. The Spartans, led by seventh-year head coach Suzy Merchant, played their home games at the Breslin Center and were members of the Big Ten Conference. They finished with a record of 23–10 overall, 13–3 in Big Ten play to share the regular season title with Penn State. They lost in the semifinals of the 2014 Big Ten Conference women's basketball tournament to Nebraska. They were invited to the 2014 NCAA Division I women's basketball tournament, where they defeated Hampton in the first round before losing to North Carolina in the second round.

== Roster ==
#	Name	Height	Position	Class	Hometown
0	Kiana Johnson	5'7"	G	Junior	Chicago, IL
1	Tori Jankoska	5'8"	G	Freshman	Freeland, MI
2	Cara Miller	6'1"	G	Sophomore	Farmington Hills, MI
4	Jasmine Hines	6'3"	C	Junior	Central Lake, MI
5	Mariah Harris	5'11"	G	Sophomore	Springfield, OH
10	Branndais Agee	5'11"	G	RS freshman	Detroit, MI
11	Annalise Pickrel	6'3"	F	Senior	Grand Rapids, MI
13	Taylor Hengesbach	5'10"	G	Freshman	Saginaw, MI
14	Anna Morrissey	5'10"	G	Junior	Lincolnshire, IL
21	Klarissa Bell	5'11"	G	Senior	East Lansing, MI
22	Camille Glymph	5'10"	G	RS junior	Greenville, SC
23	Aerial Powers	6'0"	G	RS freshman	Detroit, MI
25	Kendra Lumpkin	5'11"	F	Junior	Bolingbrook, IL
40	Madison Williams	6'7"	C	RS junior	Berkley, MI
52	Becca Mills	6'4"	F	Junior	Midland, MI

== Schedule ==
Date time, TV	Rank^{#}	Opponent^{#}	Result	Record	Site (attendance) city, state
Exhibition
10/30/2013*; 6:00 pm	No. 20	Ferris State	W 100–52	–	Breslin Center (3,787); East Lansing, MI
11/03/2013*; 4:30 pm	No. 20	Grand Valley State	W 91–47	–	Breslin Center (5,418); East Lansing, MI
Regular season
11/11/2013*; 7:00 pm	No. 19	at No. 6 Notre Dame	L 62–81	0–1	Edmund P. Joyce Center (8,242); South Bend, IN
11/14/2013*; 7:00 pm	No. 19	Canisius	W 102–54	1–1	Breslin Center (4,693); East Lansing, MI
11/17/2013*; 2:00 pm	No. 19	No. 23 Dayton	W 96–89 ^{OT}	2–1	Breslin Center (6,399); East Lansing, MI
11/20/2013*; 7:00 pm	No. 21	Detroit	W 80–41	3–1	Breslin Center (5,323); East Lansing, MI
11/23/2013*; 7:30 pm	No. 21	Rice	W 81–68	4–1	Breslin Center (5,850); East Lansing, MI
11/26/2013*; 7:00 pm	No. 21	at Temple	W 74–70	5–1	McGonigle Hall (882); Philadelphia, PA
12/01/2013*; 4:30 pm	No. 21	IPFW	L 76–81	5–2	Breslin Center (6,012); East Lansing, MI
12/04/2013*; 7:00 pm, ESPN3		at Florida State; ACC – Big Ten Women's Challenge	L 58–60	5–3	Donald L. Tucker Center (1,813); Tallahassee, FL
12/07/2013*; 2:00 pm		at Virginia Tech	L 66–72	5–4	Cassell Coliseum (1,317); Blacksburg, VA
12/15/2013*; 2:00 pm		Oakland	W 80–62	6–4	Breslin Center (6,513); East Lansing, MI
12/19/2013*; 3:00 pm		vs. No. 13 Oklahoma State; Puerto Rico Classic	L 57–63	6–5	Guillermo Angulo Coliseum (200); San Juan, PR
12/20/2013*; 3:30 pm		vs. Georgetown; Puerto Rico Classic	W 67–54	7–5	Guillermo Angulo Coliseum (253); San Juan, PR
12/29/2013*; 2:00 pm		Colgate	W 96–46	8–5	Breslin Center (8,079); East Lansing, MI
01/04/2014; 3:00 pm		at Minnesota	W 81–56	9–5 (1–0)	Williams Arena (3,442); Minneapolis, MN
01/09/2014; 7:00 pm, BTN		No. 16 Nebraska	W 70–57	10–5 (2–0)	Breslin Center (5,024); East Lansing, MI
01/12/2014; 4:30 pm, BTN		at Michigan; Rivalry	W 79–72	11–5 (3–0)	Crisler Center (4,510); Ann Arbor, MI
01/16/2014; 8:00 pm		at Iowa	W 88–72	12–5 (4–0)	Carver–Hawkeye Arena (4,176); Iowa City, IA
01/19/2014; 5:00 pm, ESPN2		No. 16 Penn State	L 54–66	12–6 (4–1)	Breslin Center (9,232); East Lansing, MI
01/23/2014; 7:00 pm		Illinois	L 51–61	12–7 (4–2)	Breslin Center (5,360); East Lansing, MI
01/26/2014; 12:30 pm, BTN		at Ohio State	W 82–68	13–7 (5–2)	Value City Arena (6,020); Columbus, OH
01/30/2014; 7:30 pm		Wisconsin	W 71–67	14–7 (6–2)	Breslin Center (5,354); East Lansing, MI
02/02/2014; 1:30 pm, BTN		No. 19 Purdue	W 89–73	15–7 (7–2)	Breslin Center (13,172); East Lansing, MI
02/05/2014; 8:00 pm	No. 24	at Illinois	W 69–53	16–7 (8–2)	State Farm Center (1,317); Champaign, IL
02/08/2014; 3:00 pm, BTN	No. 24	at No. 22 Nebraska	L 56–76	16–8 (8–3)	Pinnacle Bank Arena (7,915); Lincoln, NE
02/15/2014; 5:30 pm, BTN	No. 25	Ohio State	W 70–49	17–8 (9–3)	Breslin Center (10,626); East Lansing, MI
02/20/2014; 9:00 pm, BTN	No. 23	at Wisconsin	W 76–66	18–8 (10–3)	Kohl Center (3,848); Madison, WI
02/24/2014; 7:00 pm, BTN	No. 21	Minnesota	W 75–61	19–8 (11–3)	Breslin Center (5,703); East Lansing, MI
02/27/2014; 9:00 pm, BTN	No. 21	at Northwestern	W 75–44	20–8 (12–3)	Welsh-Ryan Arena (705); Evanston, IL
03/02/2014; 6:00 pm, BTN	No. 21	Indiana	W 76–56	21–8 (13–3)	Breslin Center (9,837); East Lansing, MI
2014 Big Ten Conference women's basketball tournament
03/07/2014; 6:30 pm, BTN	No. 19	vs. Michigan; Quarterfinals/Rivalry	W 61–58	22–8	Bankers Life Fieldhouse (N/A); Indianapolis, IN
03/08/2014; 6:00 pm, BTN	No. 19	vs. No. 16 Nebraska; Semifinals	L 58–86	22–9	Bankers Life Fieldhouse (N/A); Indianapolis, IN
NCAA women's tournament
03/23/2014*; 12:30 pm, ESPN2	No. 20	vs. Hampton; First Round	W 91–61	23–9	Carmichael Arena (N/A); Chapel Hill, NC
03/25/2014*; 7:00 pm, ESPN2	No. 20	at No. 12 North Carolina; Second Round	L 53–62	23–10	Carmichael Arena (2,010); Chapel Hill, NC
*Non-conference game. ^{#}Rankings from AP Poll. (#) Tournament seedings in parentheses. All times are in Pacific Time.

== Rankings ==
Ranking movement Legend: ██ Increase in ranking. ██ Decrease in ranking. NR = Not ranked. RV = Received votes.
Poll	Pre	Wk 2	Wk 3	Wk 4	Wk 5	Wk 6	Wk 7	Wk 8	Wk 9	Wk 10	Wk 11	Wk 12	Wk 13	Wk 14	Wk 15	Wk 16	Wk 17	Wk 18	Wk 19	Final
AP	20	19	21	21	RV	RV	NR	NR	NR	NR	RV	RV	RV	24	25	23	21	19	20	20
Coaches	18	20	19	18	25	NR	NR	NR	NR	NR	RV	NR	RV	RV	RV	RV	RV	23	24	24

== See also ==
- 2013–14 Michigan State Spartans men's basketball team
