= 2013–14 Iowa Hawkeyes women's basketball team =

Intercollegiate basketball season

2013–14 Iowa Hawkeyes women's basketball

NCAA tournament, second round
- Conference: Big Ten Conference

Ranking
- Coaches: No. 25
- AP: No. 19
- Record: 27–9 (11–5 Big Ten)
- Head coach: Lisa Bluder (14th season)
- Assistant coaches: Jan Jensen; Jenni Fitzgerald; Lacey Goldwire
- Home arena: Carver-Hawkeye Arena

2013–14 Big Ten women's basketball standings
	Conf.				Overall
Team	W		L	PCT	W		L	PCT
No. 14 Penn State	13	–	3	.813	24	–	8	.750
No. 20 Michigan State	13	–	3	.813	23	–	10	.697
No. 13 Nebraska †	12	–	4	.750	26	–	7	.788
No. 17 Purdue	11	–	5	.688	22	–	9	.710
No. 19 Iowa	11	–	5	.688	27	–	9	.750
Minnesota	8	–	8	.500	22	–	13	.629
Michigan	8	–	8	.500	20	–	14	.588
Indiana	5	–	11	.313	21	–	13	.618
Northwestern	5	–	11	.313	17	–	16	.515
Ohio State	5	–	11	.313	17	–	18	.486
Wisconsin	3	–	13	.188	10	–	19	.345
Illinois	2	–	14	.125	9	–	21	.300
† 2014 Big Ten tournament winner As of 10:03, 1 April 2014 (UTC); Rankings from AP poll

The 2013–14 Iowa Hawkeyes women's basketball team represented University of Iowa during the 2013–14 NCAA Division I women's basketball season. The Hawkeyes, led by fourteenth-year head coach Lisa Bluder, played their home games at the Carver-Hawkeye Arena and were members of the Big Ten Conference. They finished with a record of 27–9 overall, 11–5 overall, for a tie for a fourth-place finish. They lost in the championship game of the 2014 Big Ten Conference women's basketball tournament to Nebraska. They were invited to the 2014 NCAA Division I women's basketball tournament, where they defeated Marist in the first round before being defeated by Louisville in the second round.

== Roster ==
#	Name	Height	Position	Class	Hometown
1	Alexa Kastanek	5'10"	G	Freshman	Lincoln, NE
2	Ally Disterhoft	6'0"	G	Freshman	Iowa City, IA
3	Claire Till	6'0"	F	Sophomore	Dubuque, IA
21	Melissa Dixon	5'8"	G	Junior	Johnsburg, IL
22	Samantha Logic	5'9"	G	Junior	Racine, WI
23	Theairra Taylor	5'11"	G	RS Senior	St. Paul, MN
25	Kali Peschel	6'1"	G	Sophomore	Sauk Centre, MN
33	Kathryn Reynolds	5'7"	G	RS Sophomore	Cincinnati, OH
40	Hailey Schneden	6'2"	F	Freshman	Davenport, IA
45	Nicole Smith	6'4"	C	Sophomore	Rockton, IL
51	Bethany Doolittle	6'4"	C	Junior	Oakdale, MN

== Schedule ==
Date time, TV	Rank^{#}	Opponent^{#}	Result	Record	Site (attendance) city, state
Exhibition
11/03/2013*; 7:00 pm		Concordia	W 92–68	–	Carver-Hawkeye Arena (3,150); Iowa City, IA
Regular season
11/08/2013*; 6:00 pm		UC Riverside	W 70–56	1–0	Carver-Hawkeye Arena (3,162); Iowa City, IA
11/10/2013*; 7:00 pm		No. 14 Dayton	W 97–93 ^{OT}	2–0	Carver-Hawkeye Arena (3,370); Iowa City, IA
11/13/2013*; 7:00 pm		Arkansas–Pine Bluff	W 76–38	3–0	Carver-Hawkeye Arena (2,810); Iowa City, IA
11/17/2013*; 1:00 pm, MC22		Stony Brook	W 78–40	4–0	Carver-Hawkeye Arena (3,470); Iowa City, IA
11/20/2013*; 9:30 pm, P12N		at No. 16 Colorado	L 87–90	4–1	Coors Events Center (3,501); Boulder, CO
11/24/2013*; 2:30 pm		at Northern Iowa	W 67–60	5–1	McLeod Center (3,502); Cedar Falls, IA
11/28/2013*; 7:30 pm		vs. USC; Cancún Challenge	W 78–65	6–1	Moon Palace Golf & Spa Resort (507); Cancún, MX
11/29/2013*; 5:00 pm		vs. Boston College; Cancún Challenge	W 78–68	7–1	Moon Palace Golf & Spa Resort (934); Cancún, MX
11/30/2013*; 7:30 pm		vs. UNC Wilmington; Cancún Challenge	W 102–65	8–1	Moon Palace Golf & Spa Resort (934); Cancún, MX
12/05/2013*; 6:00 pm, BTN	No. 25	No. 22 Syracuse; ACC – Big Ten Women's Challenge	W 97–91	9–1	Carver-Hawkeye Arena (3,323); Iowa City, IA
12/07/2013*; 2:00 pm	No. 25	Idaho State	W 95–47	10–1	Carver-Hawkeye Arena (3,168); Iowa City, IA
12/12/2013*; 7:00 pm	No. 21	at No. 17 Iowa State; Iowa Corn Cy-Hawk Series	L 70–83	10–2	Hilton Coliseum (11,543); Ames, IA
12/21/2013*; 7:00 pm, MC22	No. 22	Drake	W 73–51	11–2	Carver-Hawkeye Arena (5,598); Iowa City, IA
12/28/2013*; 2:00 pm	No. 21	North Dakota	W 88–62	12–2	Carver-Hawkeye Arena (4,209); Iowa City, IA
01/02/2014; 6:00 pm	No. 22	at Indiana	L 84–86	12–3 (0–1)	Assembly Hall (2,888); Bloomington, IN
01/05/2014; 6:00 pm, MC22	No. 22	No. 15 Penn State	L 71–87	12–4 (0–2)	Carver-Hawkeye Arena (6,230); Iowa City, IA
01/08/2014; 7:00 pm		Minnesota	W 78–71	13–4 (1–2)	Carver-Hawkeye Arena (3,460); Iowa City, IA
01/12/2014; 12:00 pm		at Wisconsin	W 82–65	14–4 (2–2)	Kohl Center (5,245); Madison, WI
01/16/2014; 7:00 pm, MC22		Michigan State	L 72–88	14–5 (2–3)	Carver-Hawkeye Arena (4,176); Iowa City, IA
01/19/2014; 2:00 pm, BTN		at Ohio State	W 81–74	15–5 (3–3)	Value City Arena (7,567); Columbus, OH
01/25/2014; 6:00 pm, BTN		Indiana	W 84–75	16–5 (4–3)	Carver-Hawkeye Arena (7,180); Iowa City, IA
01/29/2014; 7:00 pm		at Minnesota	W 64–56	17–5 (5–3)	Williams Arena (3,124); Minneapolis, MN
02/01/2014; 2:00 pm		Nebraska	L 67–80	17–6 (5–4)	Carver-Hawkeye Arena (8,021); Iowa City, IA
02/06/2014; 5:00 pm, BTN		at No. 9 Penn State	W 73–70	18–6 (6–4)	Bryce Jordan Center (4,033); University Park, PA
02/10/2014; 6:00 pm, BTN		Northwestern	W 90–84	19–6 (7–4)	Carver-Hawkeye Arena (3,684); Iowa City, IA
02/13/2014; 8:00 pm, BTN		Illinois	W 69–55	20–6 (8–4)	Carver-Hawkeye Arena (3,636); Iowa City, IA
02/16/2014; 1:00 pm		at No. 23 Purdue	L 73–74	20–7 (8–5)	Mackey Arena (8,813); West Lafayette, IN
02/22/2014; 12:30 pm, BTN		at Michigan	W 74–70	21–7 (9–5)	Crisler Center (2,332); Ann Arbor, MI
02/27/2014; 6:00 pm, BTN	No. 25	Ohio State	W 66–61	22–7 (10–5)	Carver-Hawkeye Arena (3,492); Iowa City, IA
03/02/2014; 3:00 pm, BTN	No. 25	at Illinois	W 81–56	23–7 (11–5)	State Farm Center (2,201); Champaign, IL
2014 Big Ten Conference women's basketball tournament
03/06/2014; 1:30 pm, BTN	No. 23	vs. Illinois; First Round	W 81–62	24–7	Bankers Life Fieldhouse (5,070); Indianapolis, IN
03/07/2014; 1:30 pm, BTN	No. 23	vs. No. 17 Purdue; Quarterfinals	W 87–80	25–7	Bankers Life Fieldhouse (N/A); Indianapolis, IN
03/08/2014; 2:30 pm, BTN	No. 23	vs. Ohio State; Semifinals	W 77–73	26–7	Bankers Life Fieldhouse (N/A); Indianapolis, IN
03/09/2014; 12:00 pm, ESPN	No. 23	vs. No. 16 Nebraska; Championship Game	L 65–72	26–8	Bankers Life Fieldhouse (5,743); Indianapolis, IN
NCAA women's tournament
03/23/2014; 7:00 pm, ESPN2	No. 19	Marist; First Round	W 87–65	27–8	Carver-Hawkeye Arena (5,810); Iowa City, IA
03/25/2014*; 8:30 pm, ESPN2	No. 19	No. 3 Louisville; Second Round	L 53–83	27–9	Carver-Hawkeye Arena (4,320); Iowa City, IA
*Non-conference game. ^{#}Rankings from AP Poll. (#) Tournament seedings in parentheses. All times are in Central Time.

== Rankings ==
Ranking movement Legend: ██ Increase in ranking. ██ Decrease in ranking. NR = Not ranked. RV = Received votes.
Poll	Pre	Wk 2	Wk 3	Wk 4	Wk 5	Wk 6	Wk 7	Wk 8	Wk 9	Wk 10	Wk 11	Wk 12	Wk 13	Wk 14	Wk 15	Wk 16	Wk 17	Wk 18	Wk 19	Final
AP	NR	RV	RV	RV	25	21	22	21	22	RV	RV	RV	RV	RV	NR	RV	25	23	19	19
Coaches	RV	RV	RV	RV	RV	24	25	25	23	RV	RV	NR	NR	NR	NR	NR	NR	RV	25	25

== See also ==
- 2013–14 Iowa Hawkeyes men's basketball team
