= 2013–14 Nebraska Cornhuskers women's basketball team =

Intercollegiate basketball season

2013–14 Nebraska Cornhuskers women's basketball

Big Ten tournament Champions

NCAA Women's Tournament, 2nd Round 76–80 to BYU
- Conference: Big Ten Conference

Ranking
- Coaches: No. 12
- AP: No. 13
- Record: 26–7 (12–4 Big Ten)
- Head coach: Connie Yori (12th season)
- Assistant coaches: Sunny Smallwood; Shimmy Gray-Miller; Dayna Finch
- Home arena: Pinnacle Bank Arena

2013–14 Big Ten women's basketball standings
	Conf.				Overall
Team	W		L	PCT	W		L	PCT
No. 14 Penn State	13	–	3	.813	24	–	8	.750
No. 20 Michigan State	13	–	3	.813	23	–	10	.697
No. 13 Nebraska †	12	–	4	.750	26	–	7	.788
No. 17 Purdue	11	–	5	.688	22	–	9	.710
No. 19 Iowa	11	–	5	.688	27	–	9	.750
Minnesota	8	–	8	.500	22	–	13	.629
Michigan	8	–	8	.500	20	–	14	.588
Indiana	5	–	11	.313	21	–	13	.618
Northwestern	5	–	11	.313	17	–	16	.515
Ohio State	5	–	11	.313	17	–	18	.486
Wisconsin	3	–	13	.188	10	–	19	.345
Illinois	2	–	14	.125	9	–	21	.300
† 2014 Big Ten tournament winner As of 10:03, 1 April 2014 (UTC); Rankings from AP poll

The 2013–14 Nebraska Cornhuskers women's basketball team represented University of Nebraska–Lincoln during the 2013–14 NCAA Division I women's basketball season. The Cornhuskers, led by 12th year head coach Connie Yori, played their home games at the newly Pinnacle Bank Arena and were members of the Big Ten Conference. They finished with a record of 26–7, 12–4 in Big Ten play to finish in third place. They won the Big Ten women's tournament for the first time in school history. They received an automatic bid to the NCAA women's tournament, where they defeated Fresno State in the first round before falling to BYU in the second round to end their season.

== Roster ==
2013–14 Nebraska Cornhuskers women's basketball team
Players
Coaches

Pos.	#	Name	Height	Year	Previous school	Hometown
F	23	Emily Cady	6 ft 2 in (1.88 m)	Jr	Seward	Seward, Neb.
F	22	Allie Havers	6 ft 5 in (1.96 m)	Fr	Mattawan	Paw Paw, Mich.
F	35	Jordan Hooper	6 ft 2 in (1.88 m)	Sr	Alliance	Alliance, Neb.
G	13	Brandi Jeffery	5 ft 7 in (1.7 m)	Jr	St. James	Vacherie, La.
G	1	Tear'a Laudermill	5 ft 9 in (1.75 m)	Jr	Canyon Springs	Riverside, Calif.
G	21	Sadie Murren	5 ft 8 in (1.73 m)	So	Wahoo	Colon, Neb.
G	11	Esther Ramacieri	5 ft 8 in (1.73 m)	Fr	Dawson College /Felix Leclerc	Repentigny, Quebec, Canada
F	3	Hailie Sample	6 ft 1 in (1.85 m)	Jr	Marcus	Flower Mound, Texas
F	14	Katie Simon	6 ft 2 in (1.88 m)	Jr	Roseville	Roseville, Calif.
G	33	Rachel Theriot	6 ft 0 in (1.83 m)	So	Midpark	Middleburg Heights, Ohio
G	10	Hannah Tvrdy	5 ft 9 in (1.75 m)	Fr	Seward	Seward, Neb.

Head coach

Connie Yori

Assistant coach(es)

Sunny Smallwood
Shimmy Gray-Miller
Dayna Finch

Legend

- (C) Team captain
- (S) Suspended
- (I) Ineligible
- (W) Walk-on
- Injured
- Current redshirt

Roster
Last update: 2013-08-16

== Schedule ==
Date time, TV	Rank^{#}	Opponent^{#}	Result	Record	Site (attendance) city, state
Exhibition
10/27/2013*; 2:00 pm	No. 17	Pittsburg State	W 98–47	–	Pinnacle Bank Arena (4,782); Lincoln, NE
11/03/2013*; 2:00 pm	No. 17	Nebraska-Kearney	W 75–34	–	Pinnacle Bank Arena (4,668); Lincoln, NE
Regular Season
11/08/2013*; 12:00 pm, NET	No. 17	UCLA	W 77–49	1–0	Pinnacle Bank Arena (9,750); Lincoln, NE
11/11/2013*; 7:00 pm	No. 15	Alabama	W 62–48	2–0	Pinnacle Bank Arena (4,924); Lincoln, NE
11/15/2013*; 6:30 pm, P12N	No. 15	at Utah	W 75–69	3–0	Jon M. Huntsman Center (949); Salt Lake City, UT
11/21/2013*; 7:00 pm	No. 11	Arkansas–Pine Bluff	W 78–55	4–0	Pinnacle Bank Arena (4,599); Lincoln, NE
11/24/2013*; 2:00 pm	No. 11	Southern	W 87–64	5–0	Pinnacle Bank Arena (5,454); Lincoln, NE
11/27/2013*; 7:00 pm	No. 10	UMass Lowell	W 75–42	6–0	Pinnacle Bank Arena (5,019); Lincoln, NE
11/30/2013*; 5:00 pm	No. 10	Washington State	L 72–76	6–1	Pinnacle Bank Arena (5,933); Lincoln, NE
12/04/2013*; 5:00 pm, ESPN3	No. 15	at No. 18 North Carolina; ACC – Big Ten Women's Challenge	L 62–75	6–2	Carmichael Arena (1,534); Chapel Hill, NC
12/08/2013*; 2:00 pm	No. 15	Utah State	W 95–75	7–2	Pinnacle Bank Arena (4,494); Lincoln, NE
12/14/2013*; 11:00 am	No. 19	Creighton	W 63–38	8–2	Pinnacle Bank Arena (5,233); Lincoln, NE
12/21/2013*; 2:30 pm	No. 19	South Dakota	W 87–53	9–2	Pinnacle Bank Arena (5,358); Lincoln, NE
12/29/2013*; 2:00 pm	No. 18	Oral Roberts	W 89–53	10–2	Pinnacle Bank Arena (5,811); Lincoln, NE
01/02/2014; 8:00 pm, BTN	No. 18	Northwestern	W 66–65	11–2 (1–0)	Pinnacle Bank Arena (6,089); Lincoln, NE
01/09/2014; 6:00 pm, BTN	No. 16	at Michigan State	L 57–70	11–3 (1–1)	Breslin Center (5,024); East Lansing, MI
01/12/2014; 1:00 pm, BTN	No. 16	at Illinois	W 75–56	12–3 (2–1)	State Farm Center (3,306); Champaign, IL
01/16/2014; 8:00 pm, BTN	No. 18	Minnesota	W 88–85 ^{OT}	13–3 (3–1)	Pinnacle Bank Arena (4,922); Lincoln, NE
01/19/2014; 4:00 pm, BTN	No. 18	No. 22 Purdue	L 75–77	13–4 (3–2)	Pinnacle Bank Arena (6,196); Lincoln, NE
01/26/2014; 4:00 pm	No. 21	at Northwestern	L 59–63	13–5 (3–3)	Welsh-Ryan Arena (1,287); Evanston, IL
01/29/2014; 7:00 pm, NET		Michigan	W 84–51	14–5 (4–3)	Pinnacle Bank Arena (6,297); Lincoln, NE
02/01/2014; 2:00 pm		at Iowa	W 80–67	15–5 (5–3)	Carver–Hawkeye Arena (8,021); Iowa City, IA
02/05/2014; 7:00 pm	No. 22	at Wisconsin	W 71–70 ^{OT}	16–5 (6–3)	Kohl Center (3,307); Madison, WI
02/08/2014; 2:00 pm, BTN	No. 22	No. 24 Michigan State	W 76–56	17–5 (7–3)	Pinnacle Bank Arena (7,915); Lincoln, NE
02/13/2014; 6:00 pm	No. 21	at Michigan	W 76–68	18–5 (8–3)	Crisler Center (1,728); Ann Arbor, MI
02/16/2014; 12:00 pm, BTN	No. 21	Indiana	W 76–61	19–5 (9–3)	Pinnacle Bank Arena (8,165); Lincoln, NE
02/20/2014; 6:00 pm	No. 17	at Ohio State	W 67–59	20–5 (10–3)	Value City Arena (4,612); Columbus, OH
02/24/2014; 6:00 pm, ESPN2	No. 16	No. 8 Penn State	W 94–74	21–5 (11–3)	Pinnacle Bank Arena (7,253); Lincoln, NE
02/27/2014; 7:00 pm	No. 16	Illinois	W 72–65	22–5 (12–3)	Pinnacle Bank Arena (7,480); Lincoln, NE
03/02/2014; 1:00 pm, ESPN2	No. 16	at No. 19 Purdue	L 66–83	22–6 (12–4)	Mackey Arena (9,306); West Lafayette, IN
2014 Big Ten women's tournament
03/07/2014; 1:30 pm, BTN	No. 16	vs. Minnesota; Quarterfinals	W 80–67	23–6	Bankers Life Fieldhouse (5,677); Indianapolis, IN
03/07/2014; 6:00 pm, BTN	No. 16	vs. No. 19 Michigan State; Semifinals	W 86–58	24–6	Bankers Life Fieldhouse (N/A); Indianapolis, IN
03/09/2014; 1:00 pm, ESPN	No. 16	vs. No. 23 Iowa; Championship Game	W 72–65	25–6	Bankers Life Fieldhouse (5,743); Indianapolis, IN
2014 NCAA women's tournament
03/22/2014*; 3:00 pm, ESPN2	No. 13	vs. Fresno State; First Round	W 74–55	26–6	Pauley Pavilion (1,941); Los Angeles, CA
03/24/2014*; 8:00 pm, ESPN2	No. 13	vs. BYU; Second Round	L 76–80	26–7	Pauley Pavilion (973); Los Angeles, CA
*Non-conference game. ^{#}Rankings from AP Poll. (#) Tournament seedings in parentheses. All times are in Central Time.

== Rankings ==
Ranking movement Legend: ██ Increase in ranking. ██ Decrease in ranking. NR = Not ranked. RV = Received votes.
Poll	Pre	Wk 2	Wk 3	Wk 4	Wk 5	Wk 6	Wk 7	Wk 8	Wk 9	Wk 10	Wk 11	Wk 12	Wk 13	Wk 14	Wk 15	Wk 16	Wk 17	Wk 18	Wk 19	Final
AP	17	15	11	10	15	19	19	18	18	16	18	21	RV	22	21	17	16	16	13	13
Coaches	12	10	10	10	13	16	17	15	15	14	16	18	23	21	19	17	13	15	12	12

== See also ==
2013–14 Nebraska Cornhuskers men's basketball team
