= 2013–14 Penn State Lady Lions basketball team =

Intercollegiate basketball season

2013–14 Penn State Lady Lions basketball

Junkanoo Jam Champions Big Ten Regular Season Co-Champions

NCAA women's tournament, Sweet Sixteen
- Conference: Big Ten Conference

Ranking
- Coaches: No. 15
- AP: No. 14
- Record: 24–8 (13–3 Big Ten)
- Head coach: Coquese Washington (7th season)
- Assistant coaches: Fred Chmiel; Kia Damon; Maren Walseth
- Home arena: Bryce Jordan Center

2013–14 Big Ten women's basketball standings
	Conf.				Overall
Team	W		L	PCT	W		L	PCT
No. 14 Penn State	13	–	3	.813	24	–	8	.750
No. 20 Michigan State	13	–	3	.813	23	–	10	.697
No. 13 Nebraska †	12	–	4	.750	26	–	7	.788
No. 17 Purdue	11	–	5	.688	22	–	9	.710
No. 19 Iowa	11	–	5	.688	27	–	9	.750
Minnesota	8	–	8	.500	22	–	13	.629
Michigan	8	–	8	.500	20	–	14	.588
Indiana	5	–	11	.313	21	–	13	.618
Northwestern	5	–	11	.313	17	–	16	.515
Ohio State	5	–	11	.313	17	–	18	.486
Wisconsin	3	–	13	.188	10	–	19	.345
Illinois	2	–	14	.125	9	–	21	.300
† 2014 Big Ten tournament winner As of 10:03, 1 April 2014 (UTC); Rankings from AP poll

The 2013–14 Penn State Lady Lions basketball team represented Pennsylvania State University during the 2013–14 NCAA Division I women's basketball season. The Lady Lions, led by 7th year head coach Coquese Washington, played their home games at the Bryce Jordan Center and were members of the Big Ten Conference. They finished the season 24–8 overall, 13–3 in Big Ten play to share the Big Ten Regular Season title with Michigan State. They lost in the quarterfinals to Ohio State in the 2014 Big Ten Conference men's basketball tournament. They were invited to the 2014 NCAA Division I women's basketball tournament, where they defeated Wichita State in the first round, Florida in the second round before being eliminated by Stanford in the sweet sixteen.

== Roster ==
2013–14 Penn State Nittany Lions women's basketball team
Players
Coaches

Pos.	#	Name	Height	Year	Previous school	Hometown
F/C	1	Candice Agee	6 ft 6 in (1.98 m)	—	So	Silverado	Victorville, Calif.
G	2	Dara Taylor	5 ft 8 in (1.73 m)	—	RS Sr	Caravel Academy/Maryland	Wilmington, Del.
F	5	Talia East	6 ft 3 in (1.91 m)	—	Sr	Friends' Central School	Philadelphia, Pa.
G	10	Keke Sevillian	5 ft 6 in (1.68 m)	—	Fr	Goodrich	Goodrich, Mich.
F	11	Alex Harris	6 ft 3 in (1.91 m)	—	Fr	Lorain	Lorain, Ohio
G	12	Lindsey Spann	5 ft 6 in (1.68 m)	—	Fr	Good Counsel	Laurel, Md.
G/F	15	Kaliyah Mitchell	6 ft 2 in (1.88 m)	—	Fr	Stephenson	Stone Mountain, Ga.
C	20	Infiniti Alston	6 ft 5 in (1.96 m)	—	Fr	Digital Harbor	Baltimore, Md.
F	23	Ariel Edwards	6 ft 3 in (1.91 m)	—	Sr	Christ the King	Elmont, N.Y.
G/F	25	Peyton Whitted	6 ft 2 in (1.88 m)	—	Fr	North Gwinnett	Suwanee, Ga.
G	33	Maggie Lucas	5 ft 10 in (1.78 m)	—	Sr	Germantown Academy	Narberth, Pa.
G	35	Sierra Moore	5 ft 10 in (1.78 m)	—	RS So	Delone Catholic/Duke	Hanover, Pa.
G/F	41	Jenny DeGraaf	6 ft 1 in (1.85 m)	—	Fr	Springboro	Springboro, Ohio
F/C	44	Tori Waldner	6 ft 5 in (1.96 m)	—	Jr	Milton	Milton, Ga.

Head coach

Coquese Washington

Assistant coach(es)

Fred Chmiel
Kia Damon
Maren Walseth

Legend

- (C) Team captain
- (S) Suspended
- (I) Ineligible
- (W) Walk-on
- Injured
- Current redshirt

Roster
Last update: 2013-08-16

== Schedule ==
Date time, TV	Rank^{#}	Opponent^{#}	Result	Record	Site (attendance) city, state
Exhibition
10/27/2013*; 2:00 pm	No. 13	Lock Haven	W 102–51	–	Bryce Jordan Center (3,443); University Park, PA
Regular Season
11/08/2013*; 7:00 pm	No. 13	Saint Francis (PA)	W 117–77	1–0	Bryce Jordan Center (3,908); University Park, PA
11/10/2013*; 2:00 pm	No. 13	Fordham	W 78–61	2–0	Bryce Jordan Center (3,834); University Park, PA
11/17/2013*; 12:00 pm, BTN	No. 13	No. 1 Connecticut	L 52–71	2–1	Bryce Jordan Center (8,194); University Park, PA
11/20/2013*; 7:00 pm	No. 14	Bucknell	W 92–49	3–1	Bryce Jordan Center (3,646); University Park, PA
11/29/2013*; 3:15 pm	No. 13	vs. Oregon State; Junkanoo Jam semifinals	W 61–56	4–1	St. George HS Gymnasium (N/A); Freeport, BAH
11/30/2013*; 11:30 am	No. 13	vs. Illinois State; Junkanoo Jam championship	W 72–60	5–1	St. George HS Gymnasium (236); Freeport, BAH
12/04/2013*; 7:30 pm, BTN	No. 10	No. 4 Notre Dame; ACC – Big Ten Women's Challenge	L 67–77	5–2	Bryce Jordan Center (5,805); University Park, PA
12/08/2013*; 2:00 pm	No. 10	at Georgetown	W 77–68	6–2	McDonough Gymnasium (529); Washington, D.C.
12/11/2013*; 8:00 pm	No. 12	at South Dakota State	L 79–83	6–3	Frost Arena (1,713); Brookings, SD
12/15/2013*; 2:00 pm	No. 12	No. 24 Texas A&M	W 66–58	7–3	Bryce Jordan Center (4,777); University Park, PA
12/22/2013*; 11:00 am	No. 17	Alcorn State	W 89–65	8–3	Bryce Jordan Center (N/A); University Park, PA
12/29/2013*; 2:00 pm	No. 17	Hartford	W 70–56	9–3	Bryce Jordan Center (4,629); University Park, PA
01/05/2014; 3:00 pm	No. 15	at No. 22 Iowa	W 87–71	10–3 (1–0)	Carver–Hawkeye Arena (6,230); Iowa City, IA
01/09/2014; 9:00 pm, BTN	No. 14	at Illinois	W 82–76	11–3 (2–0)	State Farm Center (1,317); Champaign, IL
01/12/2014; 3:00 pm, ESPN	No. 14	No. 21 Purdue	L 74–84	11–4 (2–1)	Bryce Jordan Center (4,853); University Park, PA
01/16/2014; 7:00 pm, BTN	No. 16	Ohio State	W 66–42	12–4 (3–1)	Bryce Jordan Center (3,964); University Park, PA
01/19/2014; 5:00 pm, ESPN2	No. 16	at Michigan State	W 66–54	13–4 (4–1)	Breslin Center (9,232); East Lansing, MI
01/22/2014; 7:00 pm	No. 13	Indiana	W 65–52	14–4 (5–1)	Bryce Jordan Center (4,828); University Park, PA
01/26/2014; 1:00 pm, CBS	No. 13	Minnesota	W 83–53	15–4 (6–1)	Bryce Jordan Center (6,292); University Park, PA
01/30/2014; 6:00 pm, BTN	No. 12	at No. 19 Purdue	W 75–72	16–4 (7–1)	Mackey Arena (7,785); West Lafayette, IN
02/02/2014; 2:00 pm	No. 12	at Northwestern	W 79–75	17–4 (8–1)	Welsh-Ryan Arena (1,698); Evanston, IL
02/06/2014; 6:00 pm, BTN	No. 9	Iowa	L 70–73	17–5 (8–2)	Bryce Jordan Center (4,033); University Park, PA
02/09/2014; 2:00 pm, ESPN2	No. 9	at Ohio State	W 74–54	18–5 (9–2)	Value City Arena (6,591); Columbus, OH
02/13/2014; 7:00 pm	No. 11	at Indiana	W 71–63	19–5 (10–2)	Assembly Hall (2,115); Bloomington, IN
02/16/2014; 1:00 pm, ESPN2	No. 11	Wisconsin	W 78–68	20–5 (11–2)	Bryce Jordan Center (12,585); University Park, PA
02/20/2014; 7:00 pm, BTN	No. 9	Northwestern	W 82–73	21–5 (12–2)	Bryce Jordan Center (3,960); University Park, PA
02/24/2014; 7:00 pm, ESPN2	No. 8	at No. 16 Nebraska	L 74–94	21–6 (12–3)	Pinnacle Bank Arena (7,253); Lincoln, NE
03/01/2014; 3:30 pm, BTN	No. 8	Michigan	W 77–62	22–6 (13–3)	Bryce Jordan Center (6,494); University Park, PA
2014 Big Ten Conference women's tournament
03/07/2014; 12:00 pm, BTN	No. 11	vs. Ohio State; Quarterfinals	L 82–99	22–7	Bankers Life Fieldhouse (5,903); Indianapolis, IN
2014 NCAA women's tournament
03/23/2014*; 12:30 pm, ESPN2	No. 14	Wichita State; First Round	W 62–56	23–7	Bryce Jordan Center (N/A); University Park, PA
03/25/2014*; 7:00 pm, ESPN2	No. 14	Florida; Second Round	W 83–61	24–7	Bryce Jordan Center (3,500); University Park, PA
03/30/2014*; 4:30 pm, ESPN2	No. 14	at No. 6 Stanford; Sweet Sixteen	L 57–82	24–8	Maples Pavilion (N/A); Stanford, CA
*Non-conference game. ^{#}Rankings from AP Poll. (#) Tournament seedings in parentheses. All times are in Eastern Time.

== Rankings ==
Ranking movement Legend: ██ Increase in ranking. ██ Decrease in ranking. NR = Not ranked. RV = Received votes.
Poll	Pre	Wk 2	Wk 3	Wk 4	Wk 5	Wk 6	Wk 7	Wk 8	Wk 9	Wk 10	Wk 11	Wk 12	Wk 13	Wk 14	Wk 15	Wk 16	Wk 17	Wk 18	Wk 19	Final
AP	13	13	14	13	10	12	17	15	15	14	16	13	12	9	11	9	8	11	14	14
Coaches	15	15	15	14	11	12	18	17	17	15	17	13	13	10	11	11	12	11	15	15

== See also ==
2013–14 Penn State Nittany Lions basketball team
