= 2014 Big Ten women's basketball tournament =

- Classification: Division I
- Season: 2013–14
- Teams: 12
- Site: Bankers Life Fieldhouse; Indianapolis, IN
- Champions: Nebraska (1st title)
- Winning coach: Connie Yori (1st title)
- MVP: Rachel Theriot (Nebraska)
- Attendance: 35,407
- Television: BTN and ESPN

2013–14 Big Ten women's basketball standings
	Conf.				Overall
Team	W		L	PCT	W		L	PCT
No. 14 Penn State	13	–	3	.813	24	–	8	.750
No. 20 Michigan State	13	–	3	.813	23	–	10	.697
No. 13 Nebraska †	12	–	4	.750	26	–	7	.788
No. 17 Purdue	11	–	5	.688	22	–	9	.710
No. 19 Iowa	11	–	5	.688	27	–	9	.750
Minnesota	8	–	8	.500	22	–	13	.629
Michigan	8	–	8	.500	20	–	14	.588
Indiana	5	–	11	.313	21	–	13	.618
Northwestern	5	–	11	.313	17	–	16	.515
Ohio State	5	–	11	.313	17	–	18	.486
Wisconsin	3	–	13	.188	10	–	19	.345
Illinois	2	–	14	.125	9	–	21	.300
† 2014 Big Ten tournament winner As of 10:03, 1 April 2014 (UTC); Rankings from AP poll

The 2014 Big Ten women's basketball tournament was a tournament from March 6 through March 9 at Bankers Life Fieldhouse in Indianapolis, IN. The first round, quarterfinals and semifinals games was televised on the Big Ten Network and the championship was on ESPN. Nebraska defeated Iowa to win their first Big Ten Title in women's basketball history. With that win, the Cornhuskers received the Big Ten Conference's automatic bid to the 2014 NCAA tournament.

== Seeds ==
All 12 Big Ten schools participated in the tournament. Teams were seeded by 2013–14 Big Ten Conference season record. The top 4 teams received a first-round bye.

Seeding for the tournament was determined at the close of the regular conference season:

Seed	School	Conf	Tiebreak 1	Tiebreak 2
#1	Penn State	13–3	1–0 vs. Mich St.	
#2	Michigan State	13–3	0–1 vs. Penn St.	
#3	Nebraska	12–4		
#4	Purdue	11–5	1–0 vs. Iowa	
#5	Iowa	11–5	0–1 vs. Purdue	
#6	Minnesota	8–8	1–0 vs. Mich	
#7	Michigan	8–8	0–1 vs. Minn	
#8	Ohio State	5–11	2–0 vs. Ind, NW	
#9	Northwestern	5–11	1–1 vs. Ind, Ohio St.	
#10	Indiana	5–11	0–2 vs. NW, Ohio St.	
#11	Wisconsin	3–13		
#12	Illinois	2–14		

== Schedule ==
Session	Game	Time*	Matchup^{#}	Television	Score
First Round - Thursday, March 6
1	1	12:00pm	Northwestern vs. Ohio State	BTN	77–86
1	2	2:30pm	Illinois vs. Iowa	BTN	62–81
2	3	6:30pm	Indiana vs. Michigan	BTN	57–82
2	4	9:00pm	Wisconsin vs. Minnesota	BTN	68–74^{OT}
Quarterfinals - Friday, March 7
3	5	12:00pm	Ohio State vs. Penn State	BTN	99–82
3	6	2:30pm	Iowa vs. Purdue	BTN	87–80
4	7	6:30pm	Michigan vs. Michigan State	BTN	58–61
4	8	9:00pm	Minnesota vs. Nebraska	BTN	67–80
Semifinals - Saturday, March 8
5	9	3:30pm	Ohio State vs. Iowa	BTN	73–77
5	10	6:00pm	Nebraska vs. Michigan State	BTN	86–58
Championship Game - Sunday, March 9
6	11	1:00pm	Iowa vs. Nebraska	ESPN	65–72
Games times in Eastern Time. #Rankings denote tournament seeding.

== Bracket ==
First round Thursday, March 6 BTN
8	Ohio State	86
9	Northwestern	77
5	Iowa	81
12	Illinois	62
7	Michigan	82
10	Indiana	57
6	Minnesota	74^{OT}
11	Wisconsin	68

Quarterfinals; Friday, March 7 BTN
1	Penn State	82
8	Ohio State	99
5	Iowa	87
4	Purdue	80
2	Michigan State	61
7	Michigan	57
3	Nebraska	80
6	Minnesota	67

Semifinals; Saturday, March 8 BTN
8	Ohio State	73
5	Iowa	77
2	Michigan State	58
3	Nebraska	86

Championship; Sunday, March 9 ESPN
5	Iowa	65
3	Nebraska	72

== See also ==
- 2014 Big Ten Conference men's basketball tournament
