= Indiana National Guard Governor's Cup =

Indiana (14)	Tie (2)	Purdue (8)
2001–02; 2004–05; 2005–06; 2008–09; 2010–11; 2011–12; 2012–13; 2016–17; 2018–19; 2020–21; 2021–22; 2022–23; 2023–24; 2024–25	2007–08; 2009–10	2002–03; 2003–04; 2006–07; 2013–14; 2014–15; 2015–16; 2017–18 2025–26

The Indiana National Guard Governor's Cup is a rivalry cup awarded in the Indiana–Purdue rivalry. It was first introduced in the fall of 2001 as the Titan Series, renamed the Crimson & Gold Cup in the fall of 2004. The name was changed to the Indiana National Guard Governor's Cup in the fall of 2013.

A total of 20 points are available in the competition, one point for each sport in which both schools compete:

1. Baseball
2. Men's Basketball
3. Women's Basketball
4. Men's Cross country
5. Women's Cross country
6. Football
7. Men's Golf
8. Women's Golf
9. Men's Indoor Track & Field
10. Women's Indoor Track & Field
11. Men's Outdoor Track & Field
12. Women's Outdoor Track & Field
13. Women's Soccer
14. Softball
15. Men's Swimming and Diving
16. Women's Swimming and Diving
17. Men's Tennis
18. Women's Tennis
19. Volleyball
20. Wrestling

The schools accumulate points based on the results of head-to-head competition or standings at the Big Ten championships for sports that Purdue and Indiana do not play head-to-head. The program with the most points at the end of the year wins the trophy, although the series can end in a tie.

If teams meet more than once in the regular season, points are split between the matches. For example, if basketball teams play twice, each game is worth 0.5 points. Sports played in series of more than 2 games such as baseball and softball use the series winner to award points as opposed to individual games.

Four of the annual competitions have trophies at stake as well as the Cup points. Most famously, the football teams compete for the Old Oaken Bucket. The three other trophies are among women's sports including the Golden Boot in women's soccer, the Monon Spike in women's volleyball, and the Barn Burner Trophy for women's basketball.

== Competition results ==
Indiana victories	Purdue victories	Tie seasons

No.	Date	Winner	Score	Recap
1	2001–02	Indiana	10½–9½	
2	2002–03	Purdue	10½–9½	
3	2003–04	Purdue	11–9	
4	2004–05	Indiana	12–8	Recap
5	2005–06	Indiana	11½–8½	Recap
6	2006–07	Purdue	10½–9½	Recap
7	2007–08	Tie	10–10	Recap
8	2008–09	Indiana	12½–7½	Recap
9	2009–10	Tie	10–10	Recap
10	2010–11	Indiana	11–9	Recap
11	2011–12	Indiana	11½–7½ (Note: Baseball teams did not meet during 2012, 2013, and 2015, resulting in only 19 points available)	Recap
12	2012–13	Indiana	12–7	Recap
13	2013–14	Purdue	12–8	Recap
14	2014–15	Purdue	10–9	Recap
15	2015–16	Purdue	12½–7½	Recap
16	2016–17	Indiana	11–9	Recap
17	2017–18	Purdue	10½–9½	Recap
18	2018–19	Indiana	10½–9½	Recap
19	2019–20	None	9–4 (Note: Competition was suspended in 2020 due to the COVID-19 pandemic, with the series result declared no contest. At the time, Indiana lead 9–4.)	Recap
20	2020–21	Indiana	10–6½ (Note: Football teams did not meet during 2020 and men's tennis teams only met once in 2021, resulting in only 18½ points available)	Recap
21	2021–22	Indiana	11½–8½	Recap
22	2022–23	Indiana	15 ½–4 ½	Recap
23	2023–24	Indiana	13–7	Recap
24	2024–25	Indiana	13–7	Recap
25	2025-26	Purdue	10 ½–9 ½	Recap
Series: Indiana leads 14–8–2

== See also ==
- Indiana–Purdue rivalry
