= Big Ten Conference Women's Basketball Coach of the Year =

- Awarded for: the top women's basketball coach in the Big Ten Conference
- Country: United States
- Presented by: Big Ten head coaches (1995–present); Big Ten media (1989–present)

History
- First award: 1984
- First winner: Tara VanDerveer, Ohio State
- Most recent: Cori Close, UCLA

The Big Ten Conference Women's Basketball Coach of the Year is an annual college basketball award presented to the top women's basketball coach in the Big Ten Conference. The winner is selected by the Big Ten media association and conference coaches. The award was first given following the 1983–84 season to Tara VanDerveer of Ohio State. Rene Portland, Jim Foster, and Brenda Frese have won the award a record four times each.

== Key ==
	Awarded one of the following National Coach of the Year awards that year: Associated Press Coach of the Year (AP); Naismith Coach of the Year (N); USBWA Women's National Coach of the Year (USBWA); WBCA National Coach of the Year Award (WBCA)
Coach (X)	Denotes the number of times the coach had been awarded the Coach of the Year award at that point
†	Co-Coaches of the Year
*	Elected to the Naismith Memorial Basketball Hall of Fame as a coach but is no longer active
*^	Active coach who has been elected to the Naismith Memorial Basketball Hall of Fame (as a coach)
Conf. W–L	Conference win–loss record for that season
Conf. St.^{T}	Conference standing at year's end (^{T}denotes a tie)
Overall W–L	Overall win–loss record for that season
Season^{‡}	Team won the NCAA Division I National Championship

== Winners ==
Season	Coach	School	National Coach of the Year Awards	Conf. W–L	Conf. St.	Overall W–L	Source(s)
1983–84	Tara VanDerveer*	Ohio State	—	17–1	1st	22–7	
1984–85	Tara VanDerveer* (2)	Ohio State	—	18–0	1st	28–3	
1985–86	Ruth Jones	Purdue	—	9–9	5th^{T}	16–11	
1986–87	Don Perrelli	Northwestern	—	—	—	—	
1987–88	Karen Langeland	Michigan State	—	—	—	—	
1988–89	Lin Dunn	Purdue	—	13–5	3rd	21–10	
1989–90^{†}	Don Perrelli (2)	Northwestern	—	—	—	—	
1989–90^{†}	Bud VanDeWege	Michigan	—	11–7	4th^{T}	20–10	
1990–91^{†}	Lin Dunn (2)	Purdue	—	17–1	1st	26–3	
1990–91^{†}	C. Vivian Stringer*	Iowa	—	13–5	2nd^{T}	21–9	
1991–92	Mary Murphy	Wisconsin	—	13–5	3rd	20–9	
1992–93	C. Vivian Stringer* (2)	Iowa	N WBCA	16–2	1st^{T}	27–4	
1993–94	Rene Portland	Penn State	—	16–2	1st	28–3	
1994–95	Jane Albright	Wisconsin	—	11–5	3rd	20–9	
1995–96	Angie Lee	Iowa	AP	15–1	1st	25–3	
1996–97^{†}	Nell Fortner	Purdue	—	12–4	1st^{T}	17–11	
1996–97^{†}	Theresa Grentz	Illinois	—	12–4	1st^{T}	24–8	
1997–98^{†}	Theresa Grentz (2)	Illinois	—	12–4	2nd	20–10	
1997–98^{†}	Sue Guevara	Michigan	—	10–6	3rd^{T}	19–10	
1998–99^{‡}	Carolyn Peck	Purdue	AP; N USBWA; WBCA	16–0	1st	34–1	
1999–2000^{†}	Sue Guevara (2)	Michigan	—	13–3	2nd	22–8	
1999–2000^{†}	Rene Portland (2)	Penn State	—	15–1	1st	30–5	
2000–01	Lisa Bluder	Iowa	—	12–4	2nd	21–10	
2001–02	Brenda (Frese) Oldfield	Minnesota	AP; USBWA	11–6	3rd	22–8	
2002–03	Rene Portland (3)	Penn State	—	13–3	1st	26–9	
2003–04	Rene Portland (4)	Penn State	WBCA	15–1	1st	28–6	
2004–05^{†}	Jim Foster	Ohio State	—	14–2	1st^{T}	30–5	
2004–05^{†}	Joanne P. McCallie	Michigan State	AP	14–2	1st^{T}	33–4	
2005–06	Jim Foster (2)	Ohio State	—	15–1	1st	29–3	
2006–07	Jim Foster (3)	Ohio State	—	15–1	1st	28–4	
2007–08	Lisa Bluder (2)	Iowa	—	13–5	1st^{T}	21–11	
2008–09	Jim Foster (4)	Ohio State	—	15–3	1st	29–6	
2009–10^{†}	Lisa Bluder (3)	Iowa	—	13–5	1st^{T}	21–11	
2009–10^{†}	Lisa Stone	Wisconsin	—	10–8	3rd^{T}	21–11	
2010–11	Suzy Merchant	Michigan State	—	13–3	1st	27–6	
2011–12	Coquese Washington	Penn State	—	13–3	1st	26–7	
2012–13^{†}	Coquese Washington (2)	Penn State	—	14–2	1st	26–6	
2012–13^{†}	Connie Yori	Nebraska	—	12–4	2nd	25–9	
2013–14^{†}	Coquese Washington (3)	Penn State	—	13–3	1st^{T}	24–8	
2013–14^{†}	Connie Yori (2)	Nebraska	—	12–4	3rd	26–7	
2014–15	Brenda Frese (2)	Maryland	—	18–0	1st	34–3	
2015–16	Teri Moren	Indiana	—	12–6	4th	21–12	
2016–17	Kim Barnes Arico	Michigan	—	11–5	3rd	28–9	
2017–18	Amy Williams	Nebraska	—	11–5	3rd^{T}	21–11	
2018–19	Brenda Frese (3)	Maryland	—	15–3	1st	29–5	
2019–20	Joe McKeown	Northwestern	—	16–2	1st^{T}	26–3	
2020–21	Brenda Frese (4)	Maryland	—	17–1	1st	21–2	
2021–22	Kim Barnes Arico (2)	Michigan	—	13–4	3rd	22–5	
2022–23	Teri Moren (2)	Indiana	AP	16–2	1st	28–4	
2023–24	Kevin McGuff	Ohio State	—	16–2	1st	25–4	
2024–25	Lindsay Gottlieb	USC	—	17–1	1st	26–2	
2025–26	Cori Close	UCLA		18–0	1st	28–1	

== Winners by school ==
School (year joined)	Winners	Years
Ohio State	7	1984, 1985, 2005, 2006, 2007, 2009, 2024
Iowa	6	1991, 1993, 1996, 2001, 2008, 2010
Penn State (1992)	6	1994, 2000, 2003, 2004, 2012, 2013
Michigan	5	1990, 1998, 2000, 2017, 2022
Purdue	5	1986, 1989, 1991, 1997, 1999
Maryland (2014)	3	2015, 2019, 2021
Michigan State	3	1988, 2005, 2011
Nebraska (2011)	3	2013, 2014, 2018
Northwestern	3	1987, 1990, 2020
Wisconsin	3	1992, 1995, 2010
Illinois	2	1997, 1998
Indiana	2	2016, 2023
Minnesota	1	2002
UCLA (2024)	1	2026
USC (2024)	1	2025
Rutgers (2014)	0	—
Oregon (2024)	0	—
Washington (2024)	0	—

== See also ==
- Big Ten Conference Men's Basketball Coach of the Year
