= Teri Moren =

American collegiate basketball coach

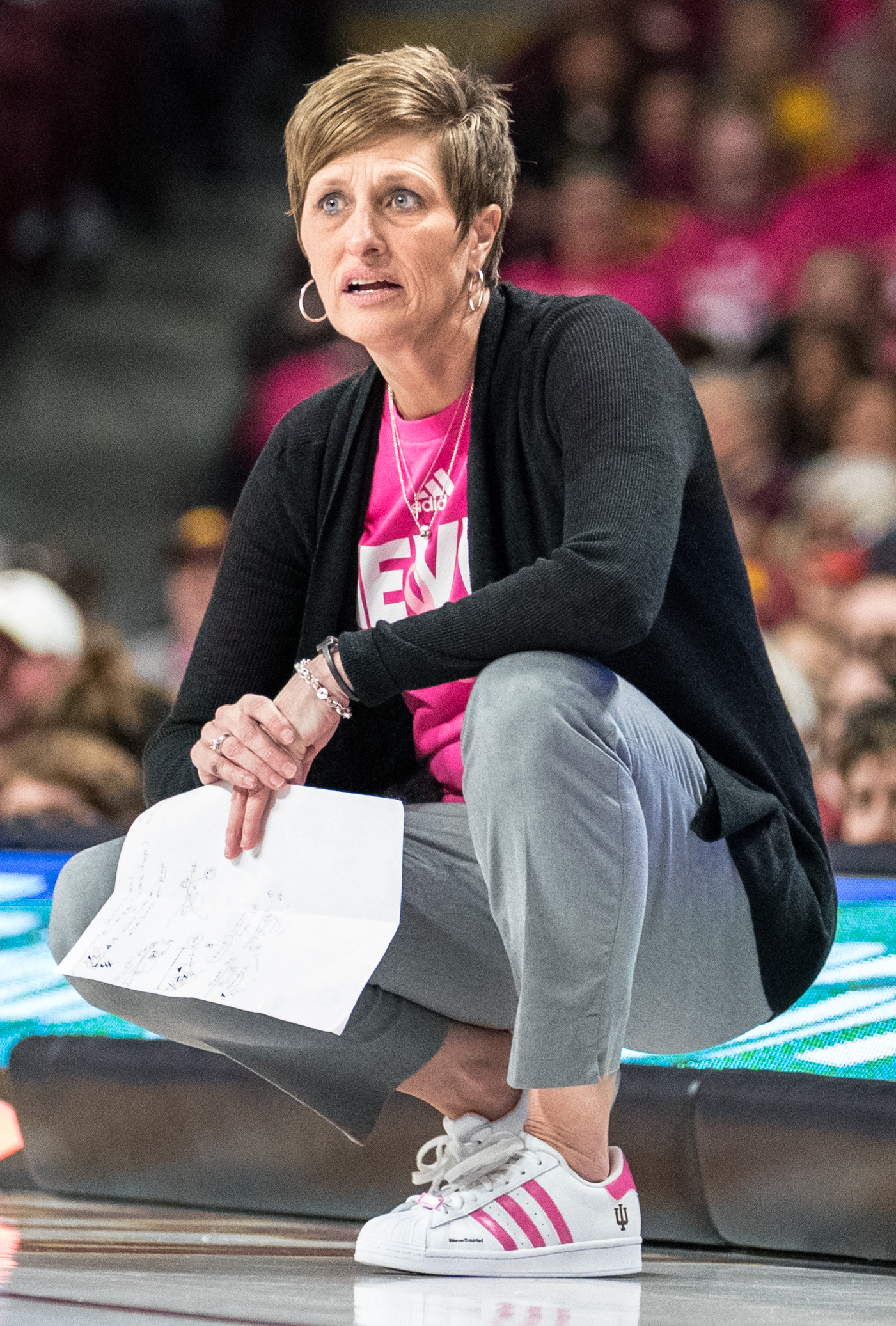
- Moren in 2020

Current position
- Title: Head coach
- Team: Indiana
- Conference: Big Ten
- Record: 264–126 (.677)

Biographical details
- Born: April 14, 1969 (age 57); Seymour, Indiana, U.S.

Playing career
- 1988–1992: Purdue

Coaching career (HC unless noted)
- 1992–1998: Butler (asst.)
- 1998–2000: Northwestern (asst.)
- 2000–2007: Indianapolis
- 2007–2010: Georgia Tech (assoc. HC)
- 2010–2014: Indiana State
- 2014–present: Indiana

Head coaching record
- Overall: 462–250 (.649)

Accomplishments and honors

Championships
- As coach: WNIT (2018); Big Ten (2023); Missouri Valley (2014); GLVC Tournament (2003); GLVC (2003); As player: Big Ten (1991)

Awards
- Kay Yow Award (2023); AP Coach of The Year (2023); 2× Big Ten Coach of the Year (2016, 2023); Seymour High School Athletics Hall of Fame (2017); Indiana Basketball Hall of Fame (2014); Indiana All-Star (1987)
Medal record
Women's basketball
FIBA Under-18 Women's Americas Championship
Gold medal – first place	2022 Buenos Aires, Argentina	Team competition

Teri Marie Moren (born April 14, 1969) is the current head coach of the Indiana University women's basketball team. Raised in Seymour, Indiana, Moren played college basketball at Purdue and was the head coach at Indianapolis from 2000 to 2007 and at Indiana State from 2010 to 2014. She became the head coach of the Indiana Hoosiers women's basketball team in 2014.

Moren's teams have acquired many championships and accolades. Her Hoosiers won the 2018 Women's National Invitation Tournament and in 2023 she became the winningest coach in program history. As an assistant coach, Moren won a gold medal at the 2022 FIBA Under-18 Women's Americas Championship. For her success, Moren was named the 2023 AP College Basketball Coach of the Year, twice named the Big Ten Conference Women's Basketball Coach of the Year (2016 and 2023), and inducted into the Indiana Basketball Hall of Fame.

== High school playing career ==
Moren played high school basketball at Seymour High School, which boasts the nation's 2nd largest high school gym, playing for Indiana Hall of Fame coach Donna Sullivan. Growing up in Seymour, Moren "went to church on Sundays, to grandma's house for lunch, then watched the Bobby Knight Show and Hoosier men's basketball games."

Over the course of her high school career, Moren won four sectional championships, two regional titles, and an appearance at the 1987 state basketball finals. In her senior year, Moren set a school record of 203 field goals made and averaged 18.4 points per game. She was named a 1987 Indiana All-Star and the Columbus Republic Female Athlete of the Year. At the conclusion of her high school career, Moren tallied 1,138 career points. She was part of the inaugural class of inducted into the Seymour High School Athletics Hall of Fame in December 2017.

== College playing career ==
Moren played collegiate basketball for the Purdue Boilermakers under coach Lin Dunn, now the Indiana Fever's general manager, and assistant Gail Goestenkors, who went on to coach Duke to four Final Four appearances. In her freshman season, 1988–89, Purdue finished 24–6, 3rd in the Big Ten, and reached the NCAA second round. In her sophomore season, 1989–90, Purdue finished 23–7, 3rd in the Big Ten, and reached the NCAA Sweet Sixteen. By Moren's junior year, the 1990–91 season, she was a consistent starter and the Boilermakers finished 26–3 overall, 1st in the Big Ten, and reached the NCAA second round. That year marked the school's first Big Ten championship. Her senior year, the 1991–92 season, the Boilermakers finished 23–7 overall, 2nd in the Big Ten, and earned a Sweet Sixteen appearance. Moren was named to the Purdue's All-Decade team and received the Ruth Jones and Red Mackey Awards at Purdue.

== Coaching career ==
=== University of Indianapolis ===
Moren began her head coaching career for the University of Indianapolis Greyhounds in Division II. She spent seven seasons at Indianapolis beginning in 2000–01. In her third year there, the 2002–03 season, the Greyhounds finished with an overall record of 29–3, a mark of 18–2 (1st), and reached the NCAA DII Second Round. At the conclusion of her final season with Indianapolis, the 2006–07 year, Moren carried an overall record of 130–73 (.640) and a conference record of 80–58 (.580).

=== Indiana State University ===
In her four years coaching the Indiana State Sycamores, Moren won a conference championship in 2013–14, two postseason appearances in the WNIT, and helped six players earn All-MVC honors. During her first year, the 2010–11 season, Moren won more games (16) as a first year coach than any other in Sycamore history. By her third year, the 2012–13 season, Moren's team finished with an 18–13 record and a berth in the 2013 Women's National Invitation Tournament. In Moren's final year with the Sycamores, the 2013–14 season, her team finished with a 20–12 record and a share of the regular season Missouri Valley Conference title, only the third time in program history that ISU won a regular season conference championship and the first since 2006.

=== Indiana University Hoosiers ===
Indiana Director of Athletics Fred Glass announced Moren as head coach of the Indiana women's basketball program on August 9, 2014. During her first year as head coach during the 2014–15 season, the Moren led Hoosiers made 236 three-point field goals, the second best total in school history at that time, and also the top five in program history in free throw percentage (4th), points scored (5th, 2,229), points per game (5th) and 3-point field goal percentage (5th, 33.1 percent). The following year, during the 2015–16 season, Moren led the Hoosiers to the most regular season wins (20) in program history to that point while also tying for overall wins (21) in a single season. Indiana captured the school's second-most Big Ten victories (12) ever and Moren earned Big Ten Coach of the Year honors. That season the Hoosiers earned the program's first NCAA Tournament berth in 14 years and finished fourth in the Big Ten, the school's highest conference finish in 18 years. The team went a perfect 14–0 at home in Assembly Hall, marking the most home wins ever without a defeat and tying for the most overall home victories in a single year in program history.

During her third year with the program, the 2016–17 season, Moren's Hoosiers finished with an overall record of 23–11, 10–6 in Big Ten play (4th place), and a birth in the Women's National Invitation Tournament, where they advanced to the quarterfinals. The following year, the 2017–18 season, Moren's Hoosiers finished the season 23–14 overall and 9–7 in Big Ten play (4th place). They were invited to the Women's National Invitation Tournament where they advanced to the finals and defeated Virginia Tech for the championship. It marked Indiana's third-straight season winning 20 or more games. The Hoosiers also set a new single season average attendance record (4,102) and the single-game attendance record of 13,007 during the WNIT Championship game.

In her fifth season leading the program, 2018–19, the Hoosiers finished 21–13 overall and 8–10 in Big Ten play. They received an at-large bid to the 2019 NCAA women's basketball tournament where they defeated Texas in the first round before losing to Oregon in the second round. The following year, the 2019–20 season, Moren's team went 24–8 overall and 13–5 in the Big Ten (4th place). Indiana was ranked in both national polls for much of the season, including all 20 weeks of the Associated Press top 25 where it topped out at a program-record ranking of No. 12, but postseason play was cancelled due to the COVID-19 pandemic.

In her seventh year with Indiana, the 2020–21 season, the Hoosiers went 21–5 overall and 16–2 in the Big Ten (2nd place), a program record for conference wins at the time. Indiana spent most of the year highly ranked in various polls, topping out at number 9 before NCAA tournament play. In the NCAA tournament that year, the Hoosiers beat top-seeded North Carolina State in the Sweet Sixteen before losing in the Elite Eight.

Following the 2020–21 season, Indiana announced a second extension to Moren's contract with Indiana, though it had actually been signed even before the season ended. Under terms of the deal, her average annual compensation is $862,500 through the 2026–27 season. Her base salary is $375,000, plus additional compensation for outside marketing and promotion income, which starts at $425,000 in 2021 and increases in increments of $25,000 each year through the 2026–27 season. Moren also stands to earn money from bonuses, including $15,000 for winning (or tying for) the Big Ten regular season title, $15,000 for winning the Big Ten Tournament, and three months' worth of base salary (approximately $94,000) for winning the NCAA title. The contract also contains a non-compete clause that would require Purdue to pay the school $10 million if she left to coach there. The contract makes Moren one of the top-paid coaches in the Big Ten.

In Moren's eighth year, the 2021–22 season, the Hoosiers finished 24–9 overall and 11–5 in Big Ten play. All five starters earned All-Big Ten honors in the annual postseason awards including All-Big Ten first team Grace Berger. The Hoosiers maintained a ranking inside the top 15 throughout the season, rising to as high as No. 4 in the Associated Press and No. 5 in the coaches poll. The team received a No. 3 seed in the 2021 NCAA Division I women's basketball tournament, where they advanced to the Elite Eight.

In the 2022–23 season, Moren guided the program to a 28–4 overall record, its first Big Ten regular season championship in 40 years, and its first-ever No. 1 seed in the NCAA Tournament. The team's success also produced substantial attendance growth at games. After averaging 2,708 per game in the year prior to Moren's arrival, average home attendance reached an all-time best of 8,104 per game in 2022–23 season, a 199% increase compared to 2013–14. And after previously ranking near the bottom of the Big Ten in attendance, Indiana ranked second in the Big Ten and in the top 10 nationally. Moren was awarded with increased compensation of more than $1.3 million annually, ranking her second in the Big Ten and among the top coaches nationally. She was named the 2023 AP College Basketball Coach of the Year. Moren's contract was extended by two years thru the 2028–29 season and includes more significant performance bonuses.

=== USA basketball ===
Moren served as an assistant coach for the gold medal-winning Women's U18 National Team that competed at the 2022 FIBA Under-18 Women's Americas Championship. Prior to that she served as a court coach for the 2021 Women's U19 World Cup trials.

== Coaching philosophy ==
On the court, Moren's players describe her as possessing a tough, strong philosophy that expects the most out of her players. But off the court, players describe her as open and communicable with teams that feel like a family. Moren places a priority on academics with a mantra of "Graduate. Win. Serve." With the Hoosiers, her players have earned 42 Academic All-Big Ten selections and seven CoSIDA Academic All-District honorees.

Moren said her mom wanted her to emulate Pat Summitt's coaching style: "'If you are going to be a coach, be like Coach Summitt.' You know, tough and hard-nosed but classy." All-American Hoosier Mackenzie Holmes described Moren as "a badass. . . You can see her passion, her competitiveness, her energy, every single game and it doesn't change. It's infectious."

== Personal life ==
A couple months after Moren took the Indiana job, her mom Barbara died from ALS. Hoosier women's basketball became her siblings and father's sanctuary. Moren is a big fan of fellow Seymour native John Mellencamp. She said his music reminds Indiana natives that they may go anywhere in the world, but "you can find your way back. There's something about being able to do what we've done here with the support of the people that have watched you grow up."

== Head coaching record ==
Record table
Season	Team	Overall	Conference	Standing	Postseason
Indianapolis (Great Lakes Valley Conference) (2000–2007)
2000–01	Indianapolis	14–13	10–10	7th	
2001–02	Indianapolis	15–11	11–9	6th	
2002–03	Indianapolis	29–3	18–2	1st	NCAA DII Second Round
2003–04	Indianapolis	23–9	14–6	3rd	NCAA DII Second Round
2004–05	Indianapolis	22–10	12–8	6th	NCAA DII Second Round
2005–06	Indianapolis	11–16	6–13	6th (East)	
2006–07	Indianapolis	16–11	9–10	5th (East)	
Indianapolis:		130–73 (.640)	80–58 (.580)		
Indiana State (Missouri Valley Conference) (2010–2014)
2010–11	Indiana State	16–16	8–10	6th	
2011–12	Indiana State	15–16	9–9	7th	
2012–13	Indiana State	18–13	10–8	T-4th	WNIT First Round
2013–14	Indiana State	20–12	14–4	T-1st	WNIT First Round
Indiana State:		69–57 (.548)	41–31 (.569)		
Indiana (Big Ten Conference) (2014–present)
2014–15	Indiana	15–16	4–14	12th	
2015–16	Indiana	21–12	12–6	4th	NCAA Second Round
2016–17	Indiana	23–11	10–6	4th	WNIT Quarterfinals
2017–18	Indiana	23–14	9–7	T-7th	WNIT Champions
2018–19	Indiana	21–13	8–10	T-10th	NCAA Second Round
2019–20	Indiana	24–8	13–5	4th	Canceled due to COVID-19
2020–21	Indiana	21–6	16–2	2nd	NCAA Elite Eight
2021–22	Indiana	24–9	11–5	5th	NCAA Sweet Sixteen
2022–23	Indiana	28–4	16–2	1st	NCAA Second Round
2023–24	Indiana	26–6	15–3	T-2nd	NCAA Sweet Sixteen
2024–25	Indiana	20–13	10–8	T–8th	NCAA Second Round
2025–26	Indiana	18–14	6–12	13th	
2026–27	Indiana	7–0			
Indiana:		271–126 (.683)	130–80 (.619)		
Total:		469–250 (.652)			
National champion Postseason invitational champion Conference regular season champion Conference regular season and conference tournament champion Division regular season champion Division regular season and conference tournament champion Conference tournament champion
