= Big Ten Coach of the Year =

Big Ten Coach of the Year may refer to:

- Big Ten Conference football individual awards#Dave McClain / Hayes–Schembechler Coach of the Year
- Big Ten Conference Men's Basketball Coach of the Year
- Big Ten Conference Women's Basketball Coach of the Year
