= Nell Fortner =

American basketball player and coach

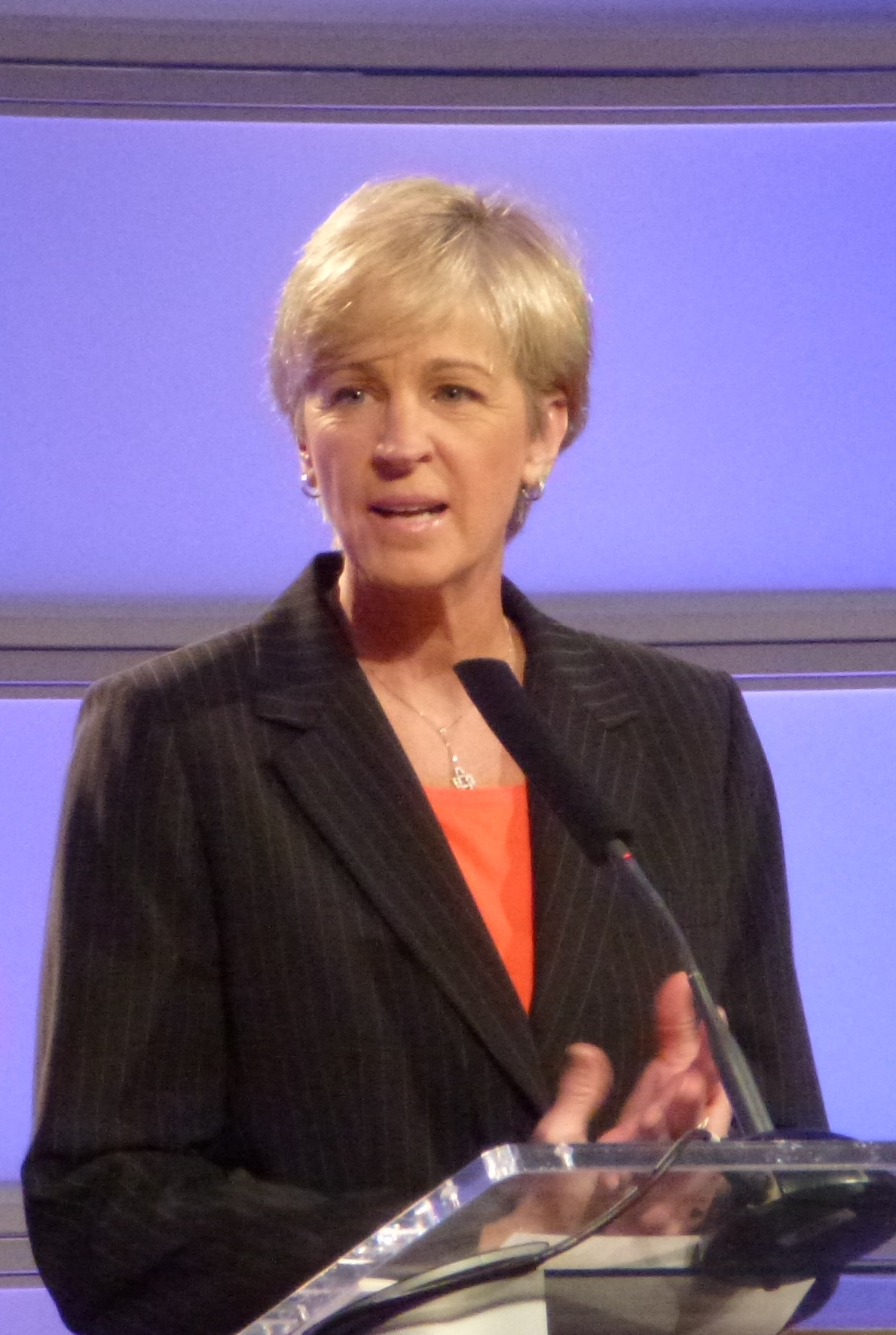

Biographical details
- Born: March 3, 1959 (age 67); Jackson, Mississippi, U.S.

Playing career
- 1978–1982: Texas

Coaching career (HC unless noted)
- 1983–1986: Killeen HS
- 1986–1987: Stephen F. Austin (G.A.)
- 1987–1990: Stephen F. Austin (asst.)
- 1990–1995: Louisiana Tech (asst.)
- 1995–1996: USA Basketball (asst.)
- 1996–1997: Purdue
- 1997–2000: USA Basketball
- 2001–2003: Indiana Fever
- 2004–2012: Auburn
- 2019–2025: Georgia Tech

Administrative career (AD unless noted)
- 1999–2003: Indiana Fever (GM)

Head coaching record
- Overall: 272–192 (.586) (College); 42–56 (.429) (WNBA)

Accomplishments and honors

Championships
- Big Ten champion (1997); SEC champion (2009)

Awards
- Basketball Times National Coach of the Year (1997); Big Ten Coach of the Year (1997); USA Basketball Coach of the Year (2000); University of Texas Women’s Athletics Wall of Honor (2001); SEC Coach of the Year (2009); WBCA Region III Coach of the Year (2009); San Antonio Sports Hall of Fame (2013)
Medal record
Head Coach for United States
Olympic Games
Gold medal – first place	2000 Sydney	Team competition
Head Coach for United States
Pan American Games
Bronze medal – third place	1999 Winnipeg	Team competition
Head Coach for United States
FIBA World Championship for Women
Gold medal – first place	1998 Berlin	Team competition
Head Coach for United States
William Jones Cup
Gold medal – first place	1998 Taipei	Team competition

Nell Fortner (born March 3, 1959) is an American college basketball coach. She is most well known for leading the 2000 Olympics team to a gold medal. She has received numerous awards including the 1997 National Coach of the Year, the 2000 USA Basketball Coach of the Year and the 2008 SEC Coach of the Year. In April 2018, she was inducted into the Texas Sports Hall of Fame.

Fortner served as a TV analyst for ESPN from 2001 to 2004 before returning as the head women's basketball coach at Auburn University. In 2013, she returned to ESPN as a TV analyst. From 2019 to 2025, she was the women's basketball coach at Georgia Tech. She is currently an analyst for women's college basketball games on the SEC Network.

== Playing career ==
Born in Jackson, Mississippi, Fortner is a graduate of New Braunfels High School where she was an all-state basketball selection and a Parade All-American. She won a dual scholarship in basketball and volleyball to the University of Texas, where she played from 1978 to 1981. As a starter under coach Jody Conradt, the basketball team compiled a 127–26 record in her 4 seasons. She led Texas to its first national ranking in women's basketball and a seventh-place finish at the AIAW national tournament. Her 1,466 career points are among the top scoring leaders in school history, and her 142 games played rank her fourth in Texas history. In addition to playing basketball for the Longhorns, she also played for the Texas volleyball team, where, as a middle hitter, she helped lead the Texas volleyball team to the 1981 AIAW National Championship.

While a freshman at UT, Fortner made her USA Basketball debut as a member of the 1978 U.S. Olympic Festival South team, winning a silver medal.

Fortner was appointed to the University of Texas Women's Athletics Wall of Honor in November 2001.

== Coaching career ==
Fortner has over two decades of experience coaching at the high school, college, pro and international levels. She began her coaching career in the 1983–84 season as the girls basketball coach at Killeen High School in Texas.

=== Stephen F. Austin ===
She turned to the college ranks as a graduate assistant under Gary Blair at Stephen F. Austin during the 1986–87 campaign while completing a master's degree in education. She stayed at SFA for three more seasons as an assistant coach, helping guide the Ladyjacks to a remarkable 87–12 (.879) record and three straight NCAA Tournament appearances. In 2007, Fortner was honored by Stephen F. Austin with the Distinguished Alumnus Award.

=== Louisiana Tech ===
Prior to the 1990–91 NCAA season, Fortner was hired by Hall of Fame coach Leon Barmore at Louisiana Tech, where she spent five years as an assistant coach from 1990 to 1995. During her tenure at the school, the Lady Techsters compiled a 123–37 (.794) record and made five straight NCAA Tournament appearances, including a trip to the national championship game in 1994.

=== Purdue ===
When Lin Dunn was fired from Purdue University, Fortner was hired to replace her as head coach. In her first year, Fortner led a Purdue team that returned just four players to a Big Ten regular-season conference title in 1996–97, going 17–11 overall and 12–4 in conference play. The season ended in an overtime loss in the second round of the NCAA tournament to #2 ranked Old Dominion, the eventual runner-up. Fortner's efforts earned her Big Ten Coach of the Year honors. She was also named the National Coach of the Year by the Basketball Times. Fortner left the Boilermakers after one season upon being appointed coach of the U.S. women's national team.

=== National team ===
Beginning in summer 1995, Fortner took a position with USA Basketball, serving as an assistant coach for one year under Tara VanDerveer. The 1995–96 USA Basketball Women's National Team posted an amazing 52–0 run that culminated with a gold medal at the 1996 Olympic Games in Atlanta. On April 1, 1997, Fortner was named to succeed VanDerveer as the U.S. head coach. She led the USA National Team to gold medals at the 1998 FIBA World Championship and 2000 Olympic Games. Fortner was named the 2000 USA Basketball Coach of the Year. She spent the three years leading up to the Sydney Games traveling the globe, coaching 10 different USA Basketball squads to an impressive 93–14 (.869) overall record as a USA Basketball head coach. She then capped that with a gold medal and a perfect 8–0 record in Sydney, bringing her total USA Basketball head coaching record to 101–14 (.878)., the most wins of any coach in Women's USA Basketball history.

=== Indiana Fever ===
On August 17, 1999, Fortner was named the first head coach and general manager of the expansion franchise Indiana Fever of the Women's National Basketball Association. However, as she was already committed to her post as the coach of the United States Olympic Team, she continued coaching Team USA through the 2000 Olympic Games. Assistant coach Anne Donovan served as interim head coach during the 2000 season before Fortner joined the Fever for the 2001 campaign. She lifted the upstart franchise during the 2002 season to a .500 record and a playoff win in the club's first post-season appearance. She resigned following the 2003 season. During her time in the WNBA, Fortner compiled a 42–56 record.

=== Auburn ===
On April 22, 2004, Nell Fortner was named the fifth head coach in Auburn Tigers women's basketball history. She replaced Joe Ciampi, who retired after his 25th season with a school-record 568 victories. Fortner was named the SEC Coach of the Year for the 2008–09 regular season, which saw her team start 20–0 before finishing 27–2 overall and 12–2 in the SEC to win the Southeastern Conference title.

=== Georgia Tech ===
In April 2019, Fortner was hired as the women's basketball coach at Georgia Tech. In 2021, the team made the program's second-ever Sweet Sixteen appearance in the NCAA Division I women's basketball tournament. Fortner went 110–75 at Georgia Tech before retiring in 2025.

== Head coaching record ==
=== NCAA ===
Record table
Season	Team	Overall	Conference	Standing	Postseason
Purdue Boilermakers (Big Ten Conference) (1996–1997)
1996–97	Purdue	17–11	12–4	T–1st	NCAA Second Round
Purdue:		17–11 (.607)	12–4 (.750)		
Auburn Tigers (Southeastern Conference) (2004–2012)
2004–05	Auburn	16–13	6–8	T–6th	
2005–06	Auburn	14–15	4–10	10th	
2006–07	Auburn	21–13	6–8	9th	WNIT Quarterfinals
2007–08	Auburn	20–12	7–7	6th	NCAA First Round
2008–09	Auburn	30–4	12–2	1st	NCAA Second Round
2009–10	Auburn	15–16	5–11	10th	
2010–11	Auburn	16–16	8–8	T–5th	WNIT Second Round
2011–12	Auburn	13–17	5–11	9th	
Auburn:		145–106 (.578)	53–65 (.449)		
Georgia Tech Yellow Jackets (Atlantic Coast Conference) (2019–2025)
2019–20	Georgia Tech	20–11	10–8	7th	Postseason not held
2020–21	Georgia Tech	17–9	12–6	3rd	NCAA Sweet Sixteen
2021–22	Georgia Tech	21–11	11–7	6th	NCAA First Round
2022–23	Georgia Tech	13–17	4–14	T–13th	
2023–24	Georgia Tech	17–16	7–11	T–10th	WBIT First Round
2024–25	Georgia Tech	22–11	9–9	T-8th	NCAA First Round
Georgia Tech:		110–75 (.595)	53–55 (.491)		
Total:		272–192 (.586)			
National champion Postseason invitational champion Conference regular season champion Conference regular season and conference tournament champion Division regular season champion Division regular season and conference tournament champion Conference tournament champion

=== WNBA ===
Legend
Regular season	G	Games coached	W	Games won	L	Games lost	W–L %	Win–loss %
Playoffs	PG	Playoff games	PW	Playoff wins	PL	Playoff losses	PW–L %	Playoff win–loss %

Team	Year	G	W	L	W–L%	Finish	PG	PW	PL	PW–L%	Result
IND	2001	32	10	22	.313	6th in Eastern	—	—	—	—	Missed Playoffs
IND	2002	32	16	16	.500	4th in Eastern	3	1	2	.333	Lost in Conference semifinals
IND	2003	34	16	18	.471	5th in Eastern	—	—	—	—	Missed Playoffs
Career		98	42	56	.429		3	1	2	.333	

=== International ===
Fortner led the United States women's national basketball team to a 101–14 record, the most wins of any coach in Women's USA Basketball history.
