= Ruth Jones (basketball) =

American basketball coach

Personal information
- Born: April 26, 1946 Philadelphia, Pennsylvania, U.S.
- Died: July 5, 1986 (aged 40)

Career information
- College: Purdue University
- Coaching career: 1976–1985

Ruth Jones (April 26, 1946 – July 5, 1986) was the head women's basketball coach for Purdue University from 1976 until her death in July 1986. She had the longest tenure as a Purdue women's basketball coach until Sharon Versyp, who surpassed her 10-year tenure in 2017. In 1986 Jones was selected as the Big Ten Conference Women's Basketball Coach of the Year.

== Early life and education ==
Ruth Jones was born in Philadelphia, Pennsylvania in 1946. She earned a bachelor's degree in education from Ashland College, a master's degree in physical education from Murray State University, and a doctorate of education from Ohio State University.

== Coaching career ==
=== Murray State ===
Jones started her coaching career at her alma mater Murray State for the 1968–69 season. She finished that year with a 6–1 record.

=== College of Wooster ===
Jones's next head coaching job was at the College of Wooster. She coached there during the 1972–73 season.

=== Ashland College ===
Jones coached women's basketball at Ashland College for three years, finishing with a 50–10 record. While coaching at Ashland, she did not recruit players to the college; she later recalled, "When I was at Ashland, we didn't recruit, yet, we were still very successful." She was inducted into the Ashland's Athletic Hall of Fame in 1986.

=== Purdue University ===
Jones was head women's basketball coach at Purdue University from 1976 to 1986. She coached both the Purdue women's basketball team and the field hockey team. During her second season as head coach, the basketball team had its first winning season, with a record of 13–7. In the 1981–82 season, she stepped down from head field hockey coach to assistant so she could spend more time with the basketball team, and that season the basketball team won its first state championship at the Indiana Association of Intercollegiate Athletics for Women (IAIAW), going on to place third at the Midwest Association of Intercollegiate Athletics for Women (MAIAW) regional tournament. During the 1984–85 season, she stopped coaching field hockey completely.

In 1986 she was named Big Ten Coach of the Year after Purdue posted its best-ever record of 16–11, with a 9–9 conference record tying for fifth place in the Big Ten.

== Death ==
Jones had successful surgery for ovarian cancer on October 7, 1983. She underwent exploratory surgery to investigate cysts on her liver. She coached until she died from ovarian cancer on July 5, 1986, following the 1985–86 season. She died at DePaul Hospital in Norfolk, Virginia. Marsha Reall was hired to replace her on July 15.

== Legacy ==
Sharon Versyp was coached by Jones, who died following Versyp's sophomore year. Versyp became the head coach for Purdue's women's basketball team in 2006, and in 2017 surpassed Jones for longest tenure as head coach for Purdue's women's basketball team. An award in Jones' name is given out for team leadership at Purdue.

== Head coaching record ==
Sourced from: Purdue History (Women's Basketball) 2002.

Record table
| Season | Team | Overall | Conference | Standing | Postseason |
|---|---|---|---|---|---|
Purdue Boilermakers (Big Ten) (1976–1986)
| 1976–77 | Purdue | 7–16 | 2–4 | 7th | IAIAW |
| 1977–78 | Purdue | 13–7 | 1–2 | T-5th | IAIAW |
| 1978–79 | Purdue | 7–19 | 0–1 | T-7th | IAIAW |
| 1979–80 | Purdue | 4–18 | 0–1 | T-7th | IAIAW |
| 1980–81 | Purdue | 14–18 | 0–1 | T-7th | IAIAW – 2nd |
| 1981–82 | Purdue | 13–17 | 0–1 | T-7th | IAIAW – 1st; MAIAW – 3rd |
| 1982–83 | Purdue | 10–16 | 3–15 | 8th | |
| 1983–84 | Purdue | 5–23 | 1–17 | 10th | |
| 1984–85 | Purdue | 12–16 | 6–12 | T-7th | |
| 1985–86 | Purdue | 16–11 | 9–9 | T-5th | |
| Total: | | 101–161 (.385) | | | |
National champion Postseason invitational champion Conference regular season champion Conference regular season and conference tournament champion Division regular season champion Division regular season and conference tournament champion Conference tournament champion
