= Brenda Frese =

American basketball player and coach

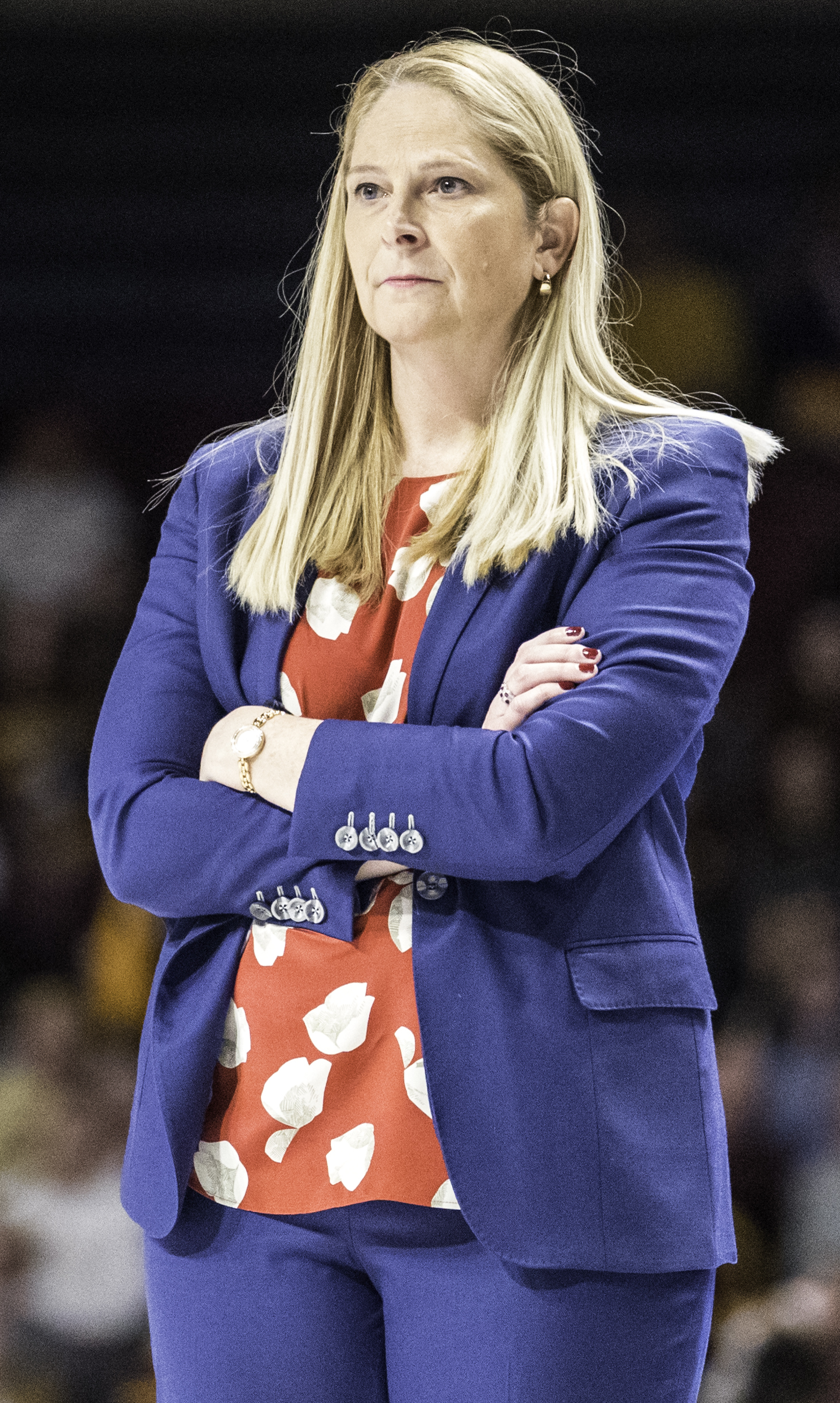
- Frese in 2020

Current position
- Title: Head coach
- Team: Maryland
- Conference: Big Ten
- Record: 631–178 (.780)

Biographical details
- Born: April 30, 1970 (age 56); Cedar Rapids, Iowa, U.S.

Playing career
- 1989–1992: Arizona
- Position: Guard

Coaching career (HC unless noted)
- 1992–1993: Pima CC (volunteer asst.)
- 1993–1995: Kent State (asst.)
- 1995–1999: Iowa State (asst.)
- 1999–2001: Ball State
- 2001–2002: Minnesota
- 2002–present: Maryland

Head coaching record
- Overall: 688–208 (.768)
- Tournaments: 45–21 (NCAA Tournament)

Accomplishments and honors

Championships
- NCAA Women's Division I Basketball Championship (2006); 3× NCAA Division I regional champion – Final Four (2006, 2014, 2015); 2× ACC tournament champion (2009, 2012); ACC regular season champion (2009); 5× Big Ten tournament champion (2015-2017, 2020, 2021); 6× Big Ten regular season champion (2015-2017, 2019-2021)

Awards
- 2× AP Coach of the Year (2002, 2021); ESPN's National Coach of the Year (2021); The Athletic's National Coach of the Year (2021); USBWA Women's National Coach of the Year (2002); ACC Coach of the Year (2013); 4× Big Ten Coach of the Year (2002, 2015, 2019, 2021); MAC Coach of the Year (2000)

Brenda Sue Frese (born April 30, 1970) is an American women's basketball head coach and former player. Since 2002, she has served as the head coach of the University of Maryland women's basketball team. In her fourth year as head coach, she won the 2006 Women's National Championship. She won the 2009 ACC regular-season and tournament championships, the women's first ACC title since 1989. She won another ACC championship in 2012 and reached another Final Four in 2014. Maryland moved to the Big Ten for the 2014–15 season and Frese led the Terrapins to an undefeated 18–0 conference record and a Big Ten regular-season championship that year. The Terrapins advanced to their second straight Final Four and third under Frese in 2015. She was voted AP National Coach of the Year in 2002 and 2021, ACC Coach of the Year in 2013, Big Ten Coach of the Year in 2002, 2015, 2019, and 2021, and MAC Coach of the Year in 2000. At Maryland, she's coached four ACC Players of the Year and four ACC Freshmen of the Year.

== Early life ==
Brenda Frese is the daughter of Bill and Donna Frese. She has five siblings: Deb, Cindy, Marsha, Stacy, and Jeff. She attended Washington High School in Cedar Rapids, Iowa. While in high school, Frese played on the basketball and volleyball teams for four years, as well as the track and softball teams for one year. She was a four-year basketball letterwinner, an Honorable Mention All-American and Iowa state champion in 1988, and an all-state and all-metro player from 1986 to 1988.

Frese attended the University of Arizona as an undergraduate student. From 1989 until 1993 she played three seasons for the varsity basketball team. In 1989, she was selected for a Pac-10 tour of West Germany. Frese graduated from the university with a Bachelor of Arts in communications in 1993. In 1995, she graduated from Kent State University with a master's degree in Athletic Administration.

== Coaching career ==
While injured as a player at the University of Arizona, Frese volunteered as an assistant coach at Pima Community College in Tucson, Arizona. Upon graduation, she immediately began pursuing a career in coaching, driving across the country to attend an NCAA Final Four and working various basketball camps. Frese's career officially started in 1994 as an assistant coach at Kent State and Iowa State and then spent three years as head coach at Ball State and Minnesota. In her very first game as a head coach, Frese led Ball State to an upset win over Minnesota.

Less than two years later, Minnesota hired Frese as their new head coach. During her 2001–02 season at Minnesota, she led a one-year turnaround of 8–20 to 22–8, one of the biggest in NCAA history. Minnesota made it to the 2nd round of the NCAA Championship that year, and Frese was named the AP National Coach of the Year for 2002. Minnesota's fan base quickly grew and the team was able to make a move to start playing its games in the same arena as the men's team. After turning around the Minnesota program, Frese became a sought-after coach and drew interest from Maryland, Ohio State, and Florida. Maryland Athletic Director Debbie Yow sealed the deal the night of the 2002 Men's NCAA Basketball Championship game, in which Maryland defeated Indiana for the national championship.

Frese was awarded the US Basketball Writers Association (USBWA) Coach of the Year award in 2002.

=== Maryland ===
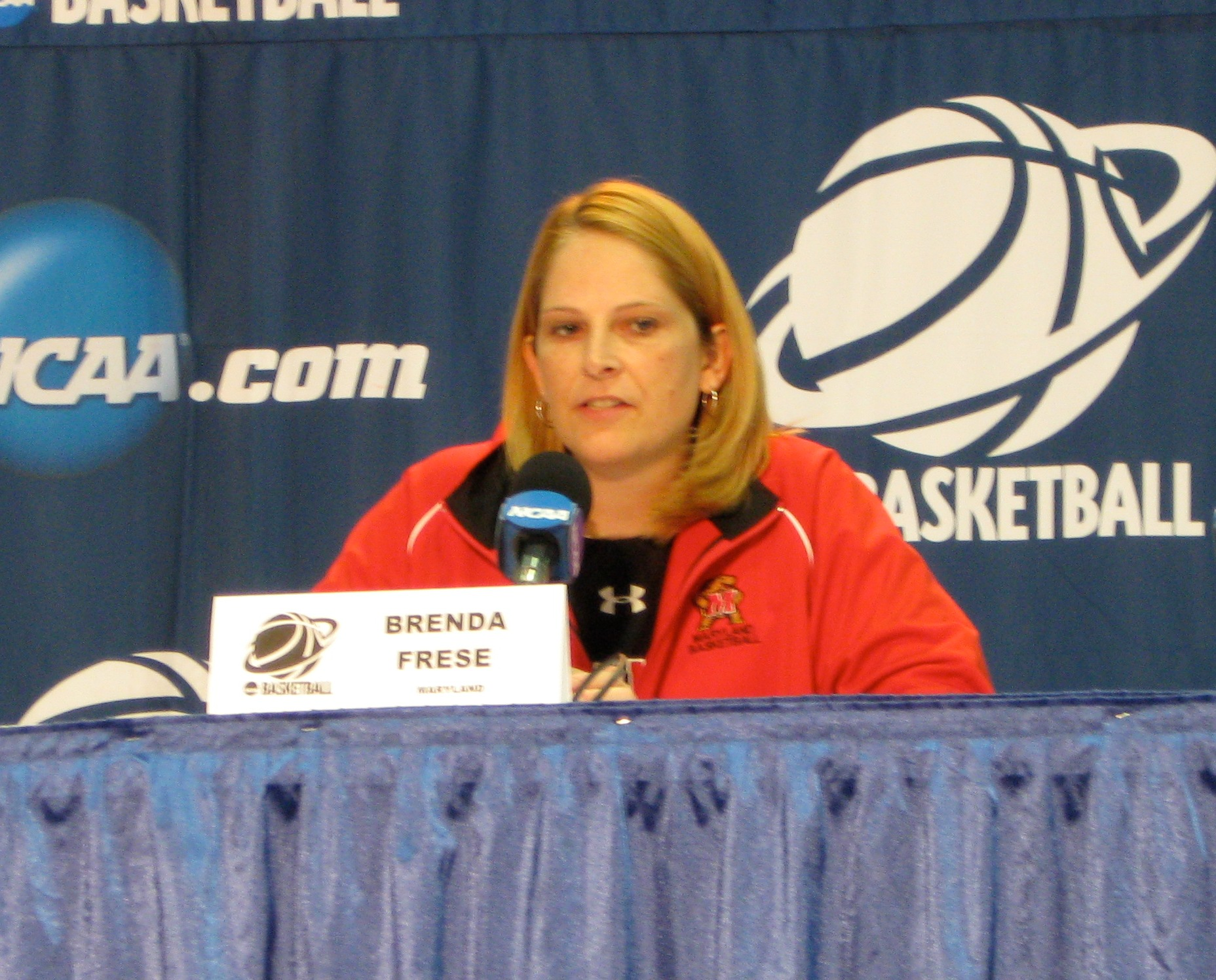
Frese at a press conference

With her appointment at Maryland before the 2002–03 season, Frese gained recognition for her national reputation and success in recruiting players. In her first recruiting class were well-known players such as Shay Doron and Kalika France, marking the beginning of a series of signing top players at College Park.

Since her first season at the helm when the team won just 10 games, Frese has guided Maryland to a National Championship in 2006, 20 winning seasons, 19-straight 20-win seasons, seven 30-win campaigns and 19 bids to the NCAA Tournament. In 2022, she signed an extension which will keep her on the Maryland sidelines through the 2028-29 season.

Player-wise, all seniors to play for Frese at Maryland have graduated.

Frese's high-octane Maryland program has also produced 16 WNBA Draft picks, including 10 in the first round. Most recently, Diamond Miller was picked No. 2 overall by the Minnesota Lynx in the 2023 WNBA Draft. Frese's players have six WNBA titles and have earned 12 WNBA All Star selections.

==== 2005–06: Championship season ====
Frese coached Maryland's Terrapins to a 34–4 record during the 2006 season. The team finished the season by winning the 2006 NCAA Division I women's basketball tournament. In the final game, Maryland's Kristi Toliver tied the game with a jump shot over center Alison Bales with six seconds left, forcing Duke into overtime, and eventually led Maryland to a win by a score of 78–75. She is the fifth youngest women's coach to win a national championship.

In October 2006, Frese and writer Chris King released a book chronicling the Terrapins' rise to their 2006 championship win entitled Overtime Is Our Time. The 200-page book, published by Terrapin State Publishing, earned acclaim by national TV basketball analyst Debbie Antonelli.

==== After the championship ====
The Terp women were ranked #1 in major preseason polls entering the 2006–07 season, a first for the program. They were also set to debut star Tennessee transfer Sa'de Wiley-Gatewood, who was unfortunately limited by tendinitis in both knees but still contributed on and off the court. The team, however, did not deliver a performance as stirring or convincing as in their championship year; they went 0–3 in the regular season against ACC rivals North Carolina and Duke, were eliminated by the Tar Heels in the ACC Tournament and were upset in the NCAA tournament's round of 32 by Ole Miss. Maryland had beaten Ole Miss decisively (110–79) during the regular season at a tournament in the Bahamas.

Maryland spent much of the 2007–08 season ranked among the nation's top five teams and finished the season 33–4. The Terps advanced to the NCAA's Elite Eight, where they lost an entertaining, high-scoring affair to Stanford, 98–87. During the season, Coach Frese gave birth to twin boys- Markus William Thomas and Tyler Joseph Thomas- on February 17, 2008. That same day, Maryland won on the road at Duke, 76–69, giving Maryland a sweep of the regular season series. Maryland won the preseason WNIT, defeating LSU in the championship game, 75–62. Kristi Toliver won the Nancy Lieberman Award, which is given annually to the nation's top point guard. Crystal Langhorne was voted ACC Player of the Year. Both Langhorne and Toliver were named State Farm All-Americans. Langhorne and fellow senior Laura Harper were top 10 picks in the WNBA draft.

In 2008–09, after losing five seniors and dropping the season opener at Texas Christian University, Frese was able to coach the team to both the ACC Regular Season and Tournament championships, as well as an NCAA Elite Eight appearance and 31–5 record. Kristi Toliver was named ACC Player of the Year, Marissa Coleman won ACC Tournament MVP and freshman Lynetta Kizer won ACC Rookie of the Year. Coleman and Toliver were selected #2 and #3, respectively, overall in the '09 WNBA draft.

In 2010–11, Maryland bounced back from a year's absence from the NCAA Tournament with a fourth-place finish in the ACC regular season. The team had no seniors on its roster. Alyssa Thomas earned seven ACC Rookie of the Week honors and won ACC Rookie of the Year. Four freshmen under Frese have won the ACC's Rookie of the Year award (Langhorne, Coleman, Kizer and Thomas). Lynetta Kizer and Alyssa Thomas earned 2nd team All-ACC honors.

After joining the Big Ten in 2014, Frese's Terrapins have had historical success in the league. Her Terrapin teams have earned a record of 157-24 (.867) in conference play, including their 20–4 record in the Big Ten Tournament. Frese and the Terps have won six of nine Big Ten Championships, five Big Ten Tournament titles and a record seven straight appearances in the Big Ten Championship game.

Frese and her staff led the Terrapins to an unprecedented level of success in their first year in the Big Ten in 2015. After losing five seniors, including three starters and a three-time All-American, Maryland led the league in scoring with 80.2 points per game, en route to a perfect 18–0 conference record in a new league and a 24-game win streak over three months. The Terrapins were the first team to go undefeated in conference play since Purdue went 16–0 in 1998–99 and Ohio State went 18–0 in 1984–85. The Terps were the first Maryland team, men’s or women’s, to stay perfect in conference play. Frese was named Big Ten Coach of the Year for the second time in her career.

In 2020–21, they clinched a share of their fifth Big Ten championship in six years with a record of 16–2 in conference play. Six Terrapins earned All-Big Ten honors - a program record. The Terps finished the season ranked No. 4 in the Associated Press and RPI rankings and were projected to be a No. 1 seed in the NCAA Tournament before it was canceled due to the COVID-19 pandemic.

After losing five starters from the 2019–20 Big Ten Championship squad, Frese and her staff reloaded with five newcomers and the return of five sophomores. Frese's Terrapins did not miss a beat in 2020–21, earning a record of 26–3 overall, 17–1 in league play and winning the program's sixth Big Ten title in seven years. The Terrapins advanced to their ninth Sweet Sixteen under Frese and led the nation in scoring with 90.8 points per game. She was named Big Ten Coach of the Year and National Coach of the Year by the AP, The Athletic and ESPN.

In 2022–23, the Terrapins brought in a roster with nine newcomers after losing four of five starters to graduation and transfers, including Angel Reese, who transferred to LSU and helped the Tigers win the 2023 national championship. Frese and her staff implemented new systems. Picked to finish fourth in the Big Ten and No. 17 in the preseason AP poll, the Terps surpassed all expectations, winning 28 games and picking up nine wins over ranked teams, including wins over No. 6 UConn, at No. 7 Notre Dame and over No. 7 Iowa. The Terps finished second in the Big Ten and advanced to the program's first Elite Eight since 2015.

== Personal life ==
Frese was previously married to Steven Oldfield from 1998 to 2002 and was known as Brenda Oldfield at the time.

Frese married Mark Thomas in 2005. In the 2007 offseason, Frese learned she was pregnant with twins. She gave birth to sons Markus William and Tyler Joseph on February 17, 2008. Her youngest son was diagnosed with leukemia (ALL) on September 28, 2010.

Frese's sister Marsha Frese is also a college basketball coach, having worked under Brenda Frese as an assistant at Ball State, Minnesota, and Maryland. In 2012, Marsha Frese became head coach at UMKC.

== Head coaching record ==
Record table
Season	Team	Overall	Conference	Standing	Postseason
Ball State Cardinals (Mid-American Conference) (1999–2001)
1999–2000	Ball State	16–13	8–8	T–6th	
2000–01	Ball State	19–9	11–5	3rd	
Ball State:		35–22 (.614)	19–13 (.594)		
Minnesota Golden Gophers (Big Ten Conference) (2001–2002)
2001–02	Minnesota	22–8	11–5	3rd	NCAA Second Round
Minnesota:		22–8 (.733)	11–5 (.688)		
Maryland Terrapins (Atlantic Coast Conference) (2002–2014)
2002–03	Maryland	10–18	4–13	9th	
2003–04	Maryland	18–13	9–9	3rd	NCAA Second Round
2004–05	Maryland	22–10	9–8	5th	NCAA Second Round
2005–06	Maryland	34–4	14–3	T–2nd	NCAA Champions
2006–07	Maryland	28–6	11–5	3rd	NCAA Second Round
2007–08	Maryland	33–4	14–2	2nd	NCAA Elite Eight
2008–09	Maryland	31–5	15–2	1st	NCAA Elite Eight
2009–10	Maryland	21–13	6–10	9th	WNIT Third Round
2010–11	Maryland	24–8	9–5	4th	NCAA Second Round
2011–12	Maryland	31–5	12–4	3rd	NCAA Elite Eight
2012–13	Maryland	26–8	14–4	3rd	NCAA Sweet Sixteen
2013–14	Maryland	28–7	12–4	3rd	NCAA Final Four
Maryland Terrapins (Big Ten Conference) (2014–present)
2014–15	Maryland	34–3	18–0	1st	NCAA Final Four
2015–16	Maryland	31–4	16–2	1st	NCAA Second Round
2016–17	Maryland	32–3	15–1	T–1st	NCAA Sweet Sixteen
2017–18	Maryland	26–8	12–4	2nd	NCAA Second Round
2018–19	Maryland	29–5	15–3	1st	NCAA Second Round
2019–20	Maryland	28–4	16–2	1st	Postseason not held
2020–21	Maryland	26–3	17–1	1st	NCAA Sweet Sixteen
2021–22	Maryland	23–9	13–4	T–2nd	NCAA Sweet Sixteen
2022–23	Maryland	28–7	15–3	T–2nd	NCAA Elite Eight
2023–24	Maryland	19–14	9–9	T–6th	NCAA First Round
2024–25	Maryland	25–8	13–5	T–3rd	NCAA Sweet Sixteen
2025–26	Maryland	24–9	11–7	T–6th	NCAA Second Round
2026–27	Maryland	0–0	0–0		
Maryland:		631–178 (.780)			
Total:		687–207 (.768)			
National champion Postseason invitational champion Conference regular season champion Conference regular season and conference tournament champion Division regular season champion Division regular season and conference tournament champion Conference tournament champion

== See also ==
- List of college women's basketball career coaching wins leaders
