= Jim Foster (basketball) =

American basketball coach (born 1948)

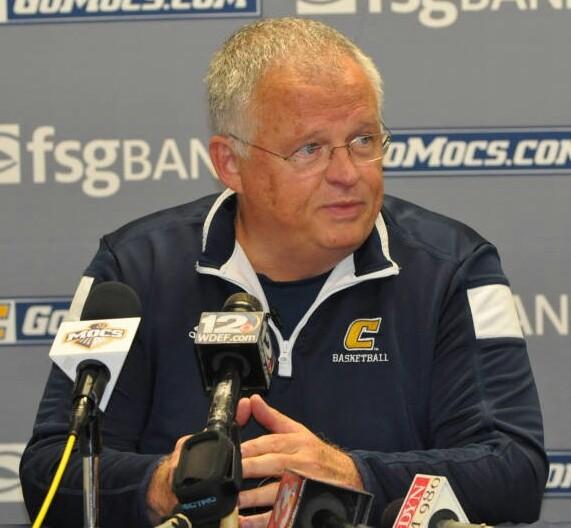
- Foster in 2015

Biographical details
- Born: October 16, 1948 (age 78); Abington, Pennsylvania, U.S.
- Education: Temple

Coaching career (HC unless noted)
- 1978–1991: Saint Joseph's
- 1991–2002: Vanderbilt
- 2002–2013: Ohio State
- 2013–2018: Chattanooga

Head coaching record
- Overall: 903–347 (.722)

Accomplishments and honors

Awards
- 4× Big Ten Coach of the Year (2005–2007, 2009); USA Basketball Developmental Coach Of The Year (2003)
- Women's Basketball Hall of Fame
Medal record
Coach for Women's Basketball
United States (head coach)
World University Games
Gold medal – first place	1997 Marsala	Team
United States (assistant coach)
Goodwill Games
Gold medal – first place	1990 Seattle	Team
World Championship
Gold medal – first place	1990 Malaysia	Team

Jim Foster (born October 16, 1948) is an American former college basketball coach. He served as the head women's basketball coach at St. Joseph's, Vanderbilt, Ohio State, and Chattanooga. He was elected to the Women's Basketball Hall of Fame as a member of the class of 2013. On February 1, 2018, Foster notched his 900th career win as a head coach, becoming the eighth fastest to reach that mark and tying for seventh in all-time career wins. He announced his retirement in May 2018, after 40 years on the bench.

== Early years ==
Foster was born October 16, 1948 in Abington, Pennsylvania. He grew up in Cheltenham, Pennsylvania, and attended Cardinal Dougherty High School in Philadelphia, Pennsylvania. He joined the Army in 1966, and served until 1969, with half of that time spent in Vietnam. While he was serving, his brother, John was drafted. Although Jim's tour was scheduled to end, he agreed to serve an additional tour in Vietnam so his brother would not have to serve in a war zone. After completing his tours, Foster attended Temple University, graduating in 1980.

== Coaching career ==
Foster began his coaching career at Bishop McDevitt High School in Cheltenham Township, Pennsylvania, where he served as the boys basketball assistant coach and the girls basketball head coach.

=== Saint Joseph's University ===
Foster began his college head coaching career as the head coach at St. Joseph's in 1978. He remained as head coach for 13 seasons, compiling a record of 248–126. In 1985, the Hawks won seven of their eight Atlantic Ten games to win the conference title. They won 25 games during the season to earn their first ever bid to an NCAA tournament. This bid would be the first of six consecutive bids to the NCAA Tournament.

=== Vanderbilt ===
Foster accepted a position as head coach of the women's basketball team at Vanderbilt in 1991. He remained there for eleven seasons, compiling a record of 256–99. He made the Elite Eight five times during his tenure with the Commodores, including a trip to the 1993 Final Four. To date this remains the only Final Four appearance by a Vanderbilt basketball team.

While at Vanderbilt, Foster served a one-year term as President of the Women's Basketball Coaches Association.

=== Ohio State ===
Foster became the head coach of the women's basketball team at Ohio State in 2002. He served in that position for eleven years, with a record of 279–82. While at Ohio State, the Big Ten selected Foster as the women's basketball coach of the year three consecutive years, 2005–2007 and again in 2009. Foster was fired by Ohio State at the end of the 2012–2013 season after his team did not make the NCAA tournament. Kevin McGuff was hired as his replacement.

Ohio State played Notre Dame in the first-ever women's basketball game played on an aircraft carrier. The game was played on the USS Yorktown, now a National Historic Landmark in Mount Pleasant, South Carolina. The Yorktown served in Vietnam while Foster was serving in Vietnam. Notre Dame won the game, 57–51.

=== Chattanooga ===
On May 9, 2013, Chattanooga announced the hiring of Foster to become the new head coach of the women's basketball team. In April 2016, Chattanooga announced that Foster's contract had been extended through the 2021–22 season, although he decided to retire in May 2018.

== USA basketball ==
Foster served as assistant coach or head coach of USA Basketball teams on nine occasions, and served (2013–16) as the chair of the Women's Junior National Team Committee.

In 1987, he was the assistant coach of the gold medal-winning 1987 Olympic Festival women's basketball team. In 1989 he was the assistant coach of the USA representative at the World Junior Championships in Bilbao, Spain (now called U19). In 1990, he was an assistant coach under Theresa Grentz for the USA National team at the World Championships in Kuala Lumpur, Malaysia. The team, behind the 22 point per game scoring of Teresa Edwards, won all eight contests, with only the win over Cuba decided by single digits. The USA team faced Yugoslavia in the gold medal game, and won 88–78. The same team returned to Seattle, Washington, for the 1990 Goodwill Games. The team hadn't lost a game in the last 36 games, but they struggled in the opening game against South Korea. They were trailing after more than eleven minutes played before going on a run to take a commanding lead. The next opponent was the USSR, who led at halftime, before the USA took over in the second half. The USA team then won two games easily, and faced the USSR again for the gold medal. This time, the USA took at ten point lead in the first half, opened the second half with a 16–1 run and held on to win 82–70.

In 1991, Foster had his first USA experience as a head coach, with the Junior Select Team, coaching the team to a 5–1 record. In 1992, he returned to his role as an assistant under Grentz, when the USA National team went to the Olympics in Barcelona, Spain. The team only suffered one loss but it was a 79–73 loss in the medal round to the Unified team (the countries of the former Soviet Union). The team won the final game against Cuba to earn the bronze medal.

Foster took over the head coaching duties of the USA Women's Junior World Championship Team in 1993. The Championship was held in Seoul, South Korea. The USA team lost to host South Korea, but then won three games to stay in contention for the medal round. At the end of preliminary play, the USA team, with a 4–1 record, was in a three-way tie for two medal round positions. The tie-breaking rule was based upon point differential, and the USA team was third behind South Korea and Russia. The USA team then lost a one-point game to France, and recovered to beat Japan in the final game. The team ended with an overall record of 5–2, but this was only good enough for seventh place.

In 1997, Foster was named head coach of the USA representative to the World University Games, held in Marsala, Sicily, Italy. The USA team had not won gold in this biennial event since 1991. This year, the USA team would be dominant, with easy victories in all but one contest. After winning their first three contests by no fewer than 38 points, the USA team faced Russia. The game had five ties and 13 lead changes. Connecticut's Nykesha Sales led the scoring of the USA team with 17 points, hitting connective baskets in the second half to give the USA a lead it would not give up. The USA went on to win the game 78–70. The USA went on to win the two medal rounds games, with a 100–82 victory over Cuba to give the USA team the gold medal.

In 2003, Foster was named head of the USA team competing at the FIBA World Championship For Young Women (also known as the U21 Women's World Championship) held in Šibenik, Croatia. After winning their first two games, the USA team lost to Brazil 73–60. The USA team went on to win their next games, and qualified for the medal round. The semifinal game was against France, their opponent in the first game, That game had been close, with the USA winning by a score of 56–48. This game would also be close, with the USA winning 58–47 to advance to the gold medal game in a rematch against Brazil. The USA team started out much better, and had a 50–31 margin early in the second half, but Brazil went on a run and cut the lead to seven points with a little over a minute left in the third quarter. Neither team scored for several minutes into the fourth quarter, but the USA finally out together a run, and won the game 71–55 to win the gold medal.

Foster now has been part of the coaching staff of five gold medal teams and one bronze medal team for the US, with an overall record of 27–4.

== Hall of Fame ==
Foster was inducted in the Women's Basketball Hall of Fame in June 2013. In his induction speech, he recalled meetings with Pat Summitt when the Hall of Fame was in the formative stages. His credentials include 35 years of head coaching experience at St. Joseph's, Vanderbilt, Ohio State and Chattanooga with a 71.8% lifetime winning percentage, along with four Big Ten Coach of the Year awards.

== Awards and honors ==
- 1985—Russell Athletic/WBCA National Coach of the Year
- 1993—United States Basketball Writers Association Coach of the Year
- 2003—USA Basketball Developmental Coach Of The Year
- 2005—Big Ten Coach of the Year
- 2006—Big Ten Coach of the year
- 2007—Big Ten Coach of the year
- 2009—Big Ten Coach of the year
- 2013—Women's Basketball Hall of Fame

== Head coaching record ==
Sources: St. Joseph's, Ohio State

Record table
Season	Team	Overall	Conference	Standing	Postseason
St. Joseph's Hawks (Independent) (1978–1979)
1978–79	St. Joseph's	16–9			AIAW
St. Joseph's:		16–9 (.640)			
St. Joseph's Hawks (Philadelphia Big 5) (1979–1983)
1979–80	St. Joseph's	11–15	3–1		
1980–81	St. Joseph's	14–11	2–2		
1981–82	St. Joseph's	16–12	2–2		
1982–83	St. Joseph's	15–13	3–1		
St. Joseph's:		56–51 (.523)	10–6 (.625)		
St. Joseph's Hawks (Atlantic 10 Conference) (1983–1991)
1983–84	St. Joseph's	17–10	3–5	6th	
1984–85	St. Joseph's	25–5	7–1	1st	NCAA first round
1985–86	St. Joseph's	22–7	2–4	T-2nd	NCAA second round
1986–87	St. Joseph's	23–9	14–4	3rd	NCAA second round
1987–88	St. Joseph's	24–8	16–2	2nd	NCAA second round
1988–89	St. Joseph's	23–8	16–2	T-1st	NCAA second round
1989–90	St. Joseph's	24–7	16–2	T-1st	NCAA first round
1990–91	St. Joseph's	18–12	10–8	T-5th	
St. Joseph's:		176–66 (.727)	84–28 (.750)		
Vanderbilt Commodores (SEC) (1991–2002)
1991–92	Vanderbilt	22–9	6–5		NCAA Elite Eight
1992–93	Vanderbilt	30–3	9–2		NCAA Final Four
1993–94	Vanderbilt	25–8	9–2		NCAA Sweet 16
1994–95	Vanderbilt	28–7	8–3		NCAA Sweet 16
1995–96	Vanderbilt	23–8	7–4		NCAA Elite Eight
1996–97	Vanderbilt	20–11	6–6		NCAA Sweet 16
1997–98	Vanderbilt	20–9	9–5		NCAA first round
1998–99	Vanderbilt	13–14	6–8		
1999-00	Vanderbilt	21–13	6–8		NCAA second round
2000–01	Vanderbilt	24–10	8–6		NCAA Elite Eight
2001–02	Vanderbilt	30–7	10–4		NCAA Elite Eight
Vanderbilt:		256–99 (.721)	84–53 (.613)		
Ohio State Buckeyes (Big Ten) (2002–2013)
2002–03	Ohio State	22–10	10–6	T-4th	NCAA second round
2003–04	Ohio State	21–10	11–5	3rd	NCAA second round
2004–05	Ohio State	30–5	14–2	T-1st	NCAA Sweet 16
2005–06	Ohio State	29–3	15–1	1st	NCAA second round
2006–07	Ohio State	28–4	15–1	1st	NCAA first round
2007–08	Ohio State	22–9	13–5	T-1st	NCAA first round
2008–09	Ohio State	29–6	15–3	1st	NCAA Sweet 16
2009–10	Ohio State	31–5	15–3	1st	NCAA second round
2010–11	Ohio State	24–10	10–6	T-3rd	NCAA Sweet 16
2011–12	Ohio State	25–7	11–5	T-2nd	NCAA first round
2012–13	Ohio State	18–13	7–9	T-8th	
Ohio State:		279–82 (.773)	136–46 (.747)		
Chattanooga Mocs (Southern) (2013–2018)
2013–14	Chattanooga	29–4	18–0	1st	NCAA first round
2014–15	Chattanooga	29–4	14–0	1st	NCAA first round
2015–16	Chattanooga	24–8	12–2	1st	NCAA first round
2016–17	Chattanooga	21–11	12–2	1st	NCAA first round
2017–18	Chattanooga	17–13	8–6	3rd	WNIT 1st Round
Chattanooga:		120–40 (.750)	64–10 (.865)		
Total:		903–347 (.722)			
National champion Postseason invitational champion Conference regular season champion Conference regular season and conference tournament champion Division regular season champion Division regular season and conference tournament champion Conference tournament champion

== See also ==
- List of college women's basketball career coaching wins leaders
