= AP College Basketball Coach of the Year =

American college basketball coach award

- Awarded for: the most outstanding men's and women's basketball head coaches in NCAA Division I
- Country: United States
- Presented by: Associated Press

History
- First award: 1967 (men); 1995 (women)
- Most recent: Fred Hoiberg, Nebraska (men); Shea Ralph, Vanderbilt (women)

The AP College Basketball Coach of the Year award was established in 1967 to recognize the best men's college basketball coach of the year, as voted upon by the Associated Press (AP). A parallel award for women's coaches was added in 1995. The 2011 women's award, shared by three coaches, was notable as the first shared AP award in any college sport. The men's award saw its first tie in 2025.

John Wooden of UCLA and Bob Knight of Indiana have won the most awards on the men's side with five and three, respectively. As of 2026, two active men's coaches have won the award twice each: Bill Self at Kansas, and Kelvin Sampson, first at Oklahoma and then at Houston. Geno Auriemma of UConn has by far the most awards, with nine on the women's side, followed by Muffet McGraw of Notre Dame with four. Tom and Keno Davis are the only father-and-son duo to win the award.

== Key ==
Coach (X)	Denotes the number of times the coach has been awarded the AP Coach of the Year Award at that point
†	Co-Coaches of the Year
W, L, W %	Total wins, total losses, win percentage
Finish	National postseason tournament result
C	Denotes national championship season

== Winners ==
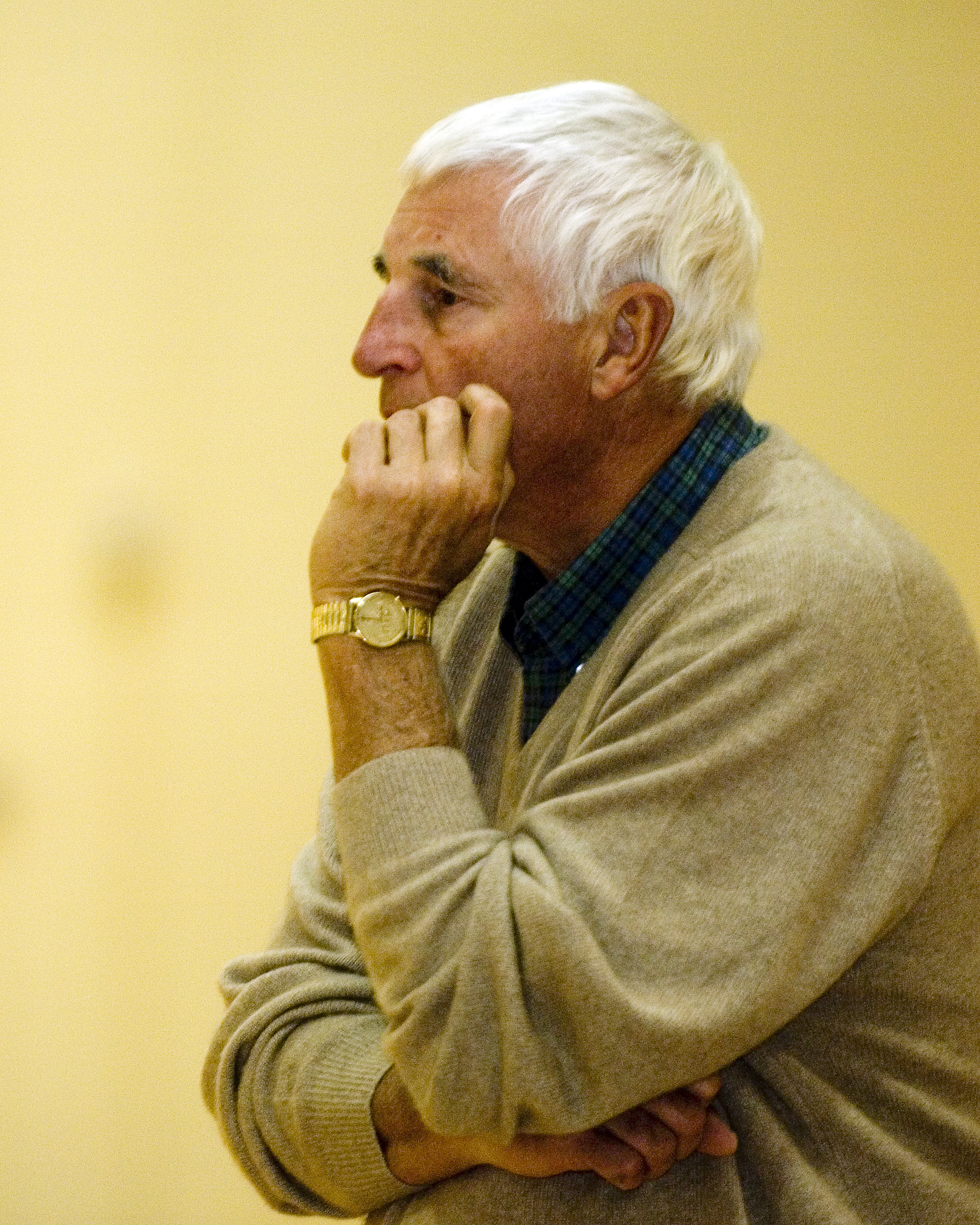
Bob Knight, Indiana, 3× winner

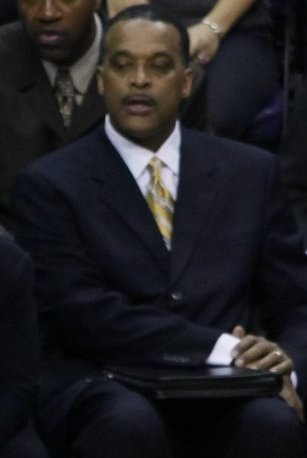
Randy Ayers, Ohio State, 1991

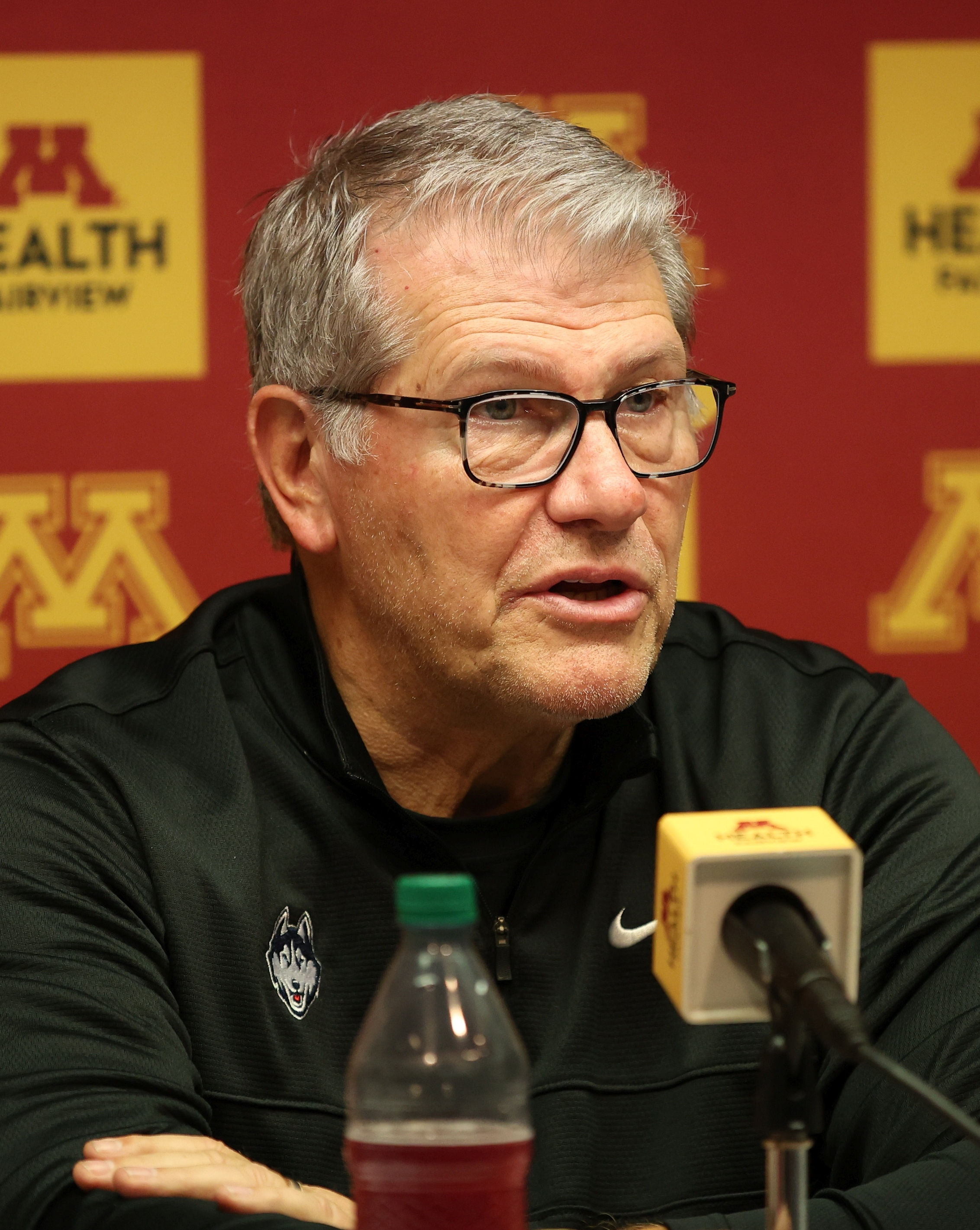
Geno Auriemma, UConn, 9× winner

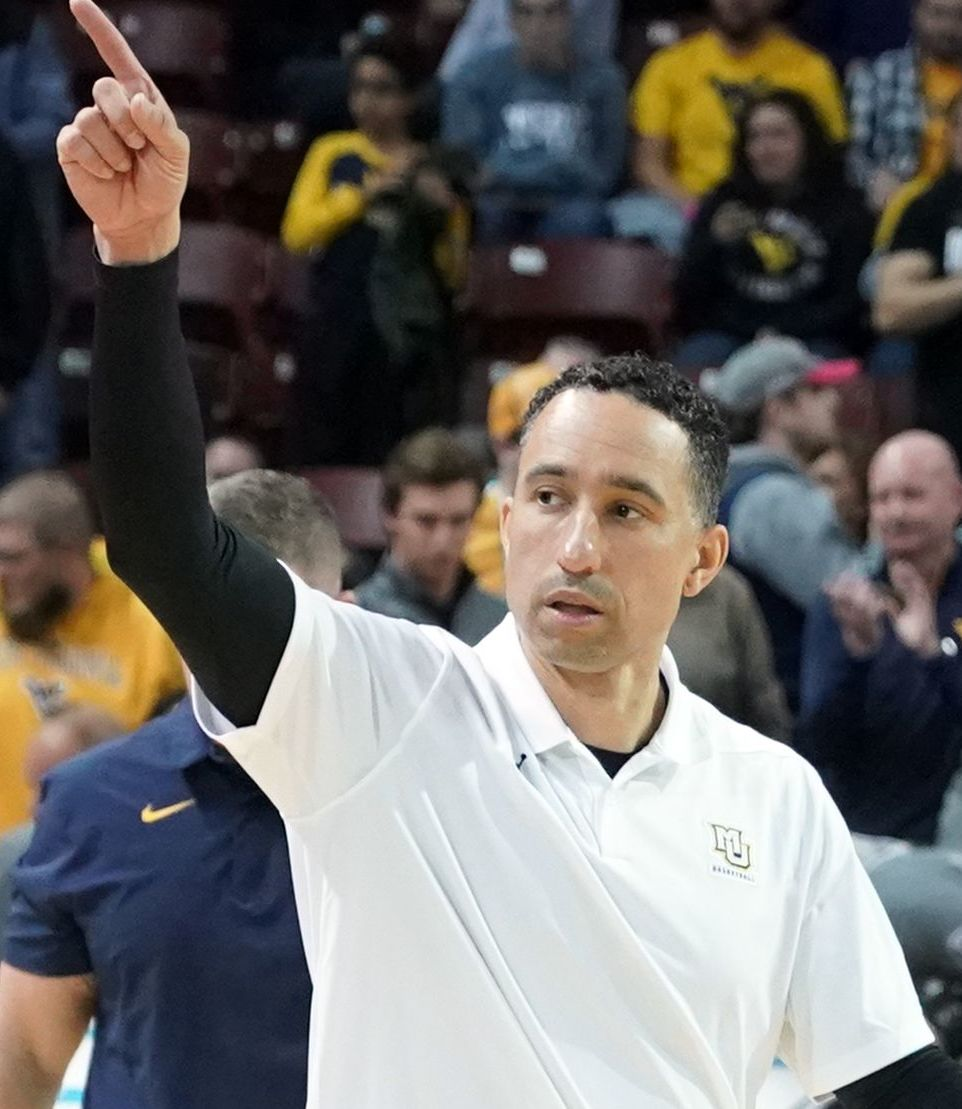
Shaka Smart, Marquette, 2023

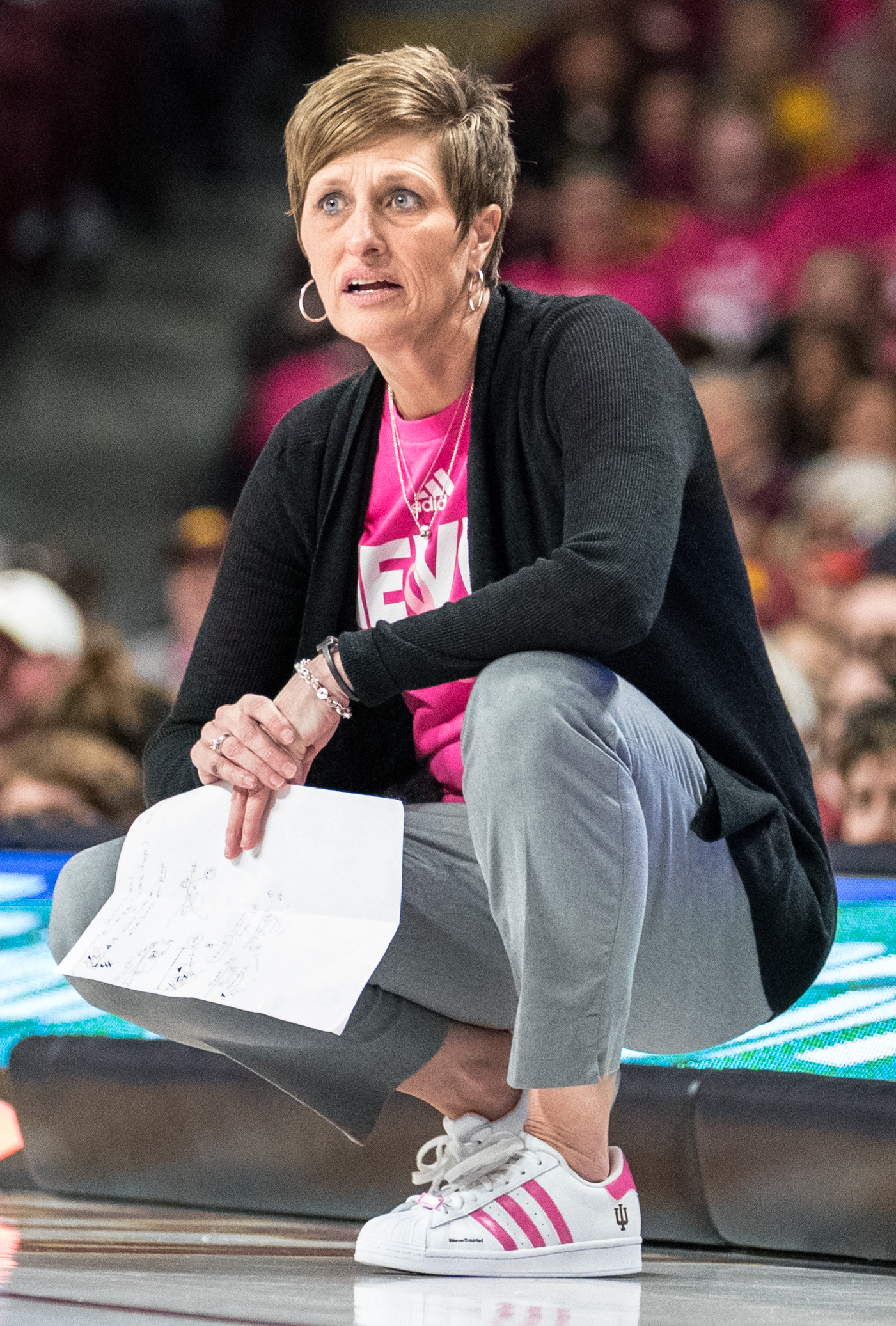
Teri Moren, Indiana, 2023

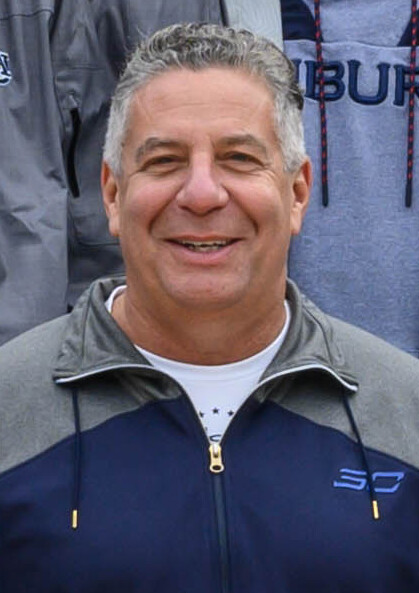
Bruce Pearl, Auburn, 2025

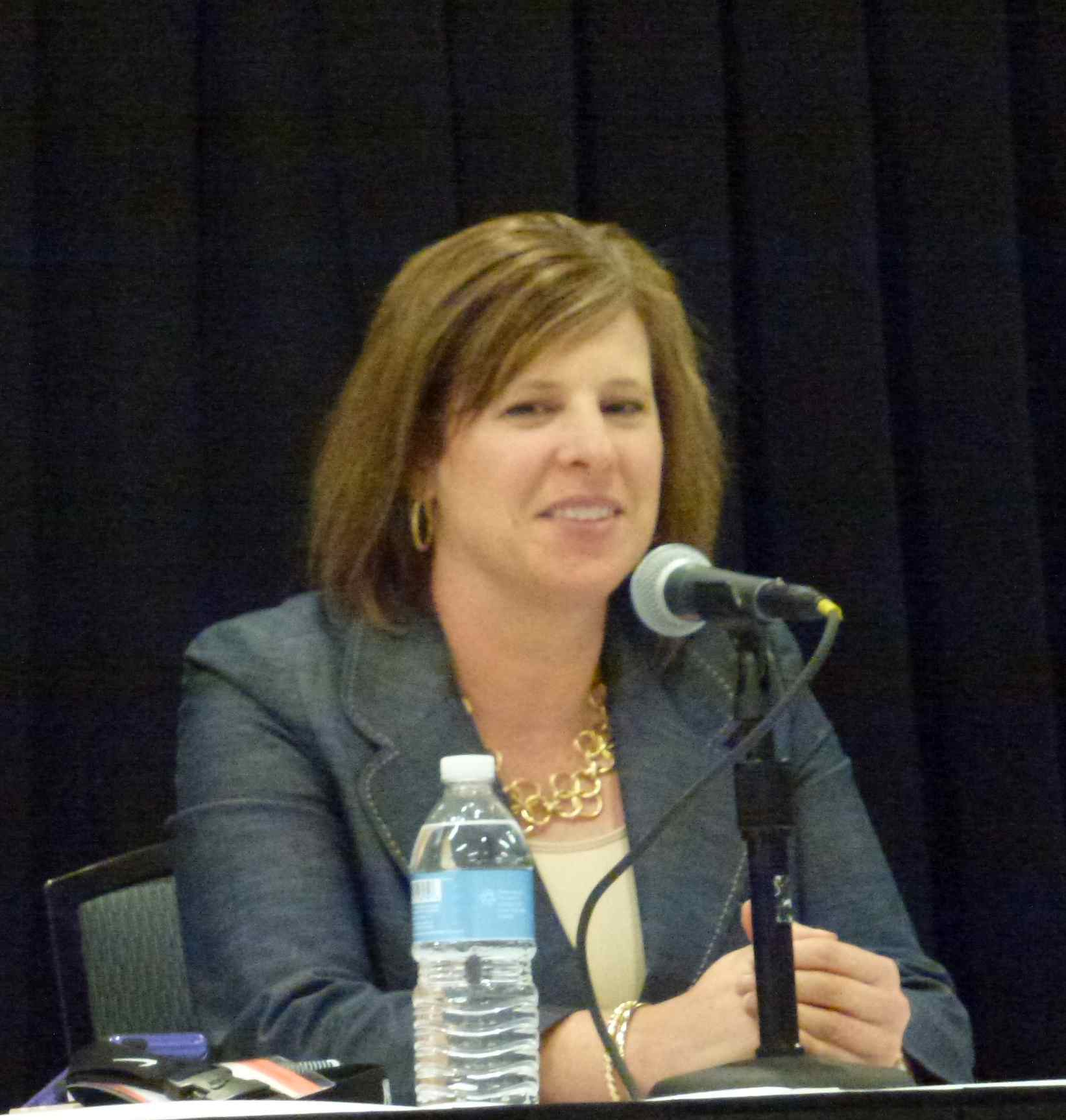
Cori Close, UCLA, 2025

Men
Season	Coach	School	W	L	W %	Finish	Reference
1966–67	John Wooden	UCLA	30	0	1.000	NCAA champion^{C}	
1967–68	Guy Lewis	Houston	31	2	.939	NCAA Final Four	
1968–69	John Wooden (2)	UCLA	29	1	.967	NCAA champion^{C}	
1969–70	John Wooden (3)	UCLA	28	2	.933	NCAA champion^{C}	
1970–71	Al McGuire	Marquette	28	1	.966	NCAA regional third place	
1971–72	John Wooden (4)	UCLA	30	0	1.000	NCAA champion^{C}	
1972–73	John Wooden (5)	UCLA	30	0	1.000	NCAA champion^{C}	
1973–74	Norm Sloan	NC State	30	1	.968	NCAA champion^{C}	
1974–75	Bob Knight	Indiana	31	1	.969	NCAA Elite Eight	
1975–76	Bob Knight (2)	Indiana	32	0	1.000	NCAA champion^{C}	
1976–77	Bob Gaillard	San Francisco	29	2	.935	NCAA first round^{[a]}	
1977–78	Eddie Sutton	Arkansas	32	4	.889	NCAA Final Four	
1978–79	Bill Hodges	Indiana State	33	1	.971	NCAA runners-up	
1979–80	Ray Meyer	DePaul	26	2	.929	NCAA second round	
1980–81	Ralph Miller	Oregon State	26	2	.929	NCAA second round	
1981–82	Ralph Miller (2)	Oregon State	25	5	.833	NCAA Elite Eight	
1982–83	Guy Lewis (2)	Houston	31	3	.912	NCAA runners-up	
1983–84	Ray Meyer (2)	DePaul	27	3	.900	NCAA Sweet Sixteen	
1984–85	Bill Frieder	Michigan	26	4	.867	NCAA second round	
1985–86	Eddie Sutton (2)	Kentucky	32	4	.889	NCAA Elite Eight	
1986–87	Tom Davis	Iowa	30	5	.857	NCAA Elite Eight	
1987–88	John Chaney	Temple	32	2	.941	NCAA Elite Eight	
1988–89	Bob Knight (3)	Indiana	27	8	.771	NCAA Sweet Sixteen	
1989–90	Jim Calhoun	UConn	31	6	.838	NCAA Elite Eight	
1990–91	Randy Ayers	Ohio State	27	4	.871	NCAA Sweet Sixteen	
1991–92	Roy Williams	Kansas	27	5	.844	NCAA second round	
1992–93	Eddie Fogler	Vanderbilt	28	6	.824	NCAA Sweet Sixteen	
1993–94	Norm Stewart	Missouri	28	4	.875	NCAA Elite Eight	
1994–95	Kelvin Sampson	Oklahoma	23	9	.719	NCAA first round	
1995–96	Gene Keady	Purdue	26^{[b]}	6^{[b]}	.813^{[b]}	NCAA second round	
1996–97	Clem Haskins^{[c]}	Minnesota^{[c]}	31^{[c]}	4^{[c]}	.886^{[c]}	NCAA Final Four^{[c]}	
1997–98	Tom Izzo	Michigan State	22	8	.733	NCAA Sweet Sixteen	
1998–99	Cliff Ellis	Auburn	29	4	.879	NCAA Sweet Sixteen	
1999–00	Larry Eustachy	Iowa State	32	5	.865	NCAA Elite Eight	
2000–01	Matt Doherty	North Carolina	26	7	.788	NCAA second round	
2001–02	Ben Howland	Pittsburgh	29	6	.829	NCAA Sweet Sixteen	
2002–03	Tubby Smith	Kentucky	32	4	.889	NCAA Elite Eight	
2003–04	Phil Martelli	Saint Joseph’s	30	2	.938	NCAA Elite Eight	
2004–05	Bruce Weber	Illinois	37	2	.949	NCAA runners-up	
2005–06	Roy Williams (2)	North Carolina	23	8	.742	NCAA second round	
2006–07	Tony Bennett	Washington State	26	8	.765	NCAA second round	
2007–08	Keno Davis	Drake	28	5	.848	NCAA first round	
2008–09	Bill Self	Kansas	27	8	.771	NCAA Sweet Sixteen	
2009–10	Jim Boeheim	Syracuse	30	5	.857	NCAA Sweet Sixteen	
2010–11	Mike Brey	Notre Dame	27	7	.794	NCAA round of 32^{[d]}	
2011–12	Frank Haith	Missouri	30	5	.857	NCAA round of 64	
2012–13	Jim Larrañaga	Miami (Florida)	29	7	.806	NCAA Sweet Sixteen	
2013–14	Gregg Marshall	Wichita State	35	1	.972	NCAA round of 32	
2014–15	John Calipari	Kentucky	38	1	.974	NCAA Final Four	
2015–16	Bill Self (2)	Kansas	33	5	.868	NCAA Elite Eight	
2016–17	Mark Few	Gonzaga	37	2	.949	NCAA runners-up	
2017–18	Tony Bennett (2)	Virginia	31	3	.912	NCAA round of 64	
2018–19	Chris Beard	Texas Tech	31	7	.816	NCAA runners-up	
2019–20	Anthony Grant	Dayton	29	2	.935	N/A^{[e]}	
2020–21	Juwan Howard	Michigan	23	5	.821	NCAA Elite Eight	
2021–22	Tommy Lloyd	Arizona	33	4	.892	NCAA Sweet Sixteen	
2022–23	Shaka Smart	Marquette	29	7	.806	NCAA round of 32	
2023–24	Kelvin Sampson (2)	Houston	32	5	.865	NCAA Sweet Sixteen	
2024–25^{†}	Bruce Pearl	Auburn	32	6	.842	NCAA Final Four	
2024–25^{†}	Rick Pitino	St. John's	31	5	.861	NCAA round of 32	
2025–26	Fred Hoiberg	Nebraska	28	7	.800	NCAA Sweet Sixteen	

Women
Season	Coach	School	W	L	W %	Finish	Reference
1966–67	No award						
1967–68	No award						
1968–69	No award						
1969–70	No award						
1970–71	No award						
1971–72	No award						
1972–73	No award						
1973–74	No award						
1974–75	No award						
1975–76	No award						
1976–77	No award						
1977–78	No award						
1978–79	No award						
1979–80	No award						
1980–81	No award						
1981–82	No award						
1982–83	No award						
1983–84	No award						
1984–85	No award						
1985–86	No award						
1986–87	No award						
1987–88	No award						
1988–89	No award						
1989–90	No award						
1990–91	No award						
1991–92	No award						
1992–93	No award						
1993–94	No award						
1994–95	Geno Auriemma	UConn	35	0	1.000	NCAA champion^{C}	
1995–96	Angie Lee	Iowa	27	4	.871	NCAA Sweet Sixteen	
1996–97	Geno Auriemma (2)	UConn	33	1	.971	NCAA Elite Eight	
1997–98	Pat Summitt	Tennessee	39	0	1.000	NCAA champion^{C}	
1998–99	Carolyn Peck	Purdue	34	1	.971	NCAA champion^{C}	
1999–00	Geno Auriemma (3)	UConn	36	1	.973	NCAA champion^{C}	
2000–01	Muffet McGraw	Notre Dame	34	2	.944	NCAA champion^{C}	
2001–02	Brenda Frese	Minnesota	22	8	.733	NCAA second round	
2002–03	Geno Auriemma (4)	UConn	37	1	.974	NCAA champion^{C}	
2003–04	Joe Curl	Houston	28	4	.875	NCAA second round	
2004–05	Joanne P. McCallie	Michigan State	33	4	.892	NCAA runners-up	
2005–06	Sylvia Hatchell	North Carolina	34	4	.895	NCAA Final Four	
2006–07	Gail Goestenkors	Duke	32	2	.941	NCAA Sweet Sixteen	
2007–08	Geno Auriemma (5)	UConn	36	2	.947	NCAA Final Four	
2008–09	Geno Auriemma (6)	UConn	39	0	1.000	NCAA champion^{C}	
2009–10	Connie Yori	Nebraska	32	2	.941	NCAA Sweet Sixteen	
2010–11^{†}	Geno Auriemma (7)	UConn	36	2	.947	NCAA Final Four	
2010–11^{†}	Katie Meier	Miami (Florida)	28	5	.848	NCAA second round	
2010–11^{†}	Tara VanDerveer	Stanford	33	3	.917	NCAA Final Four	
2011–12	Kim Mulkey	Baylor	40	0	1.000	NCAA champion^{C}	
2012–13	Muffet McGraw (2)	Notre Dame	35	2	.946	NCAA Final Four	
2013–14	Muffet McGraw (3)	Notre Dame	37	1	.974	NCAA runners-up	
2014–15	Sue Semrau	Florida State	32	5	.865	NCAA Elite Eight	
2015–16	Geno Auriemma (8)	UConn	38	0	1.000	NCAA champion^{C}	
2016–17	Geno Auriemma (9)	UConn	36	1	.973	NCAA Final Four	
2017–18	Muffet McGraw (4)	Notre Dame	35	3	.921	NCAA champion^{C}	
2018–19	Kim Mulkey (2)	Baylor	37	1	.974	NCAA champion^{C}	
2019–20	Dawn Staley	South Carolina	32	1	.970	N/A^{[e]}	
2020–21	Brenda Frese (2)	Maryland	26	3	.897	NCAA Sweet Sixteen	
2021–22	Kim Mulkey (3)	LSU	26	6	.813	NCAA round of 32^{[d]}	
2022–23	Teri Moren	Indiana	28	4	.875	NCAA round of 32	
2023–24	Dawn Staley (2)	South Carolina	38	0	1.000	NCAA champion^{C}	
2024–25	Cori Close	UCLA	34	3	.919	NCAA Final Four	
2025–26	Shea Ralph	Vanderbilt	29	5	.853	NCAA Sweet Sixteen	

- ^{a} The NCAA men's tournament expanded beyond 32 teams starting with the 1979 tournament. For purposes of sorting the "Finish" column, San Francisco's 1976–77 exit in the first round (when there were still 32 participating teams) will be 32, not 64.
- ^{b} In 1999, the NCAA Division I Committee on Infractions ruled that Purdue had violated laws involving recruiting, extra benefits, and ethical conduct, as well as several secondary violations in the women's basketball program. Their 26–6 overall record (15–3 conference) retroactively forfeited 18 wins and vacated 2 games for using an ineligible player.
- ^{c} Clem Haskins' selection was later vacated (along with that season's win total and all other accolades) due to an academic fraud scandal that ruled the entire team ineligible.
- ^{d} The NCAA men's tournament expanded to 68 teams starting in 2011, with the last four teams earning bids into the tournament set in competition with one another via "First Four" play-in games. The 'second round' then became more commonly referred to as 'round of 32' for specificity. On the women's side, 2022 was the first NCAA tournament in which 68 teams earned bids.
- ^{e} The COVID-19 pandemic caused the 2019–20 men's and women's seasons to be canceled prior to any national postseason tournaments occurring.

== See also ==
- AP College Basketball Player of the Year
