= Sharon Versyp =

American basketball player and coach (born 1965)

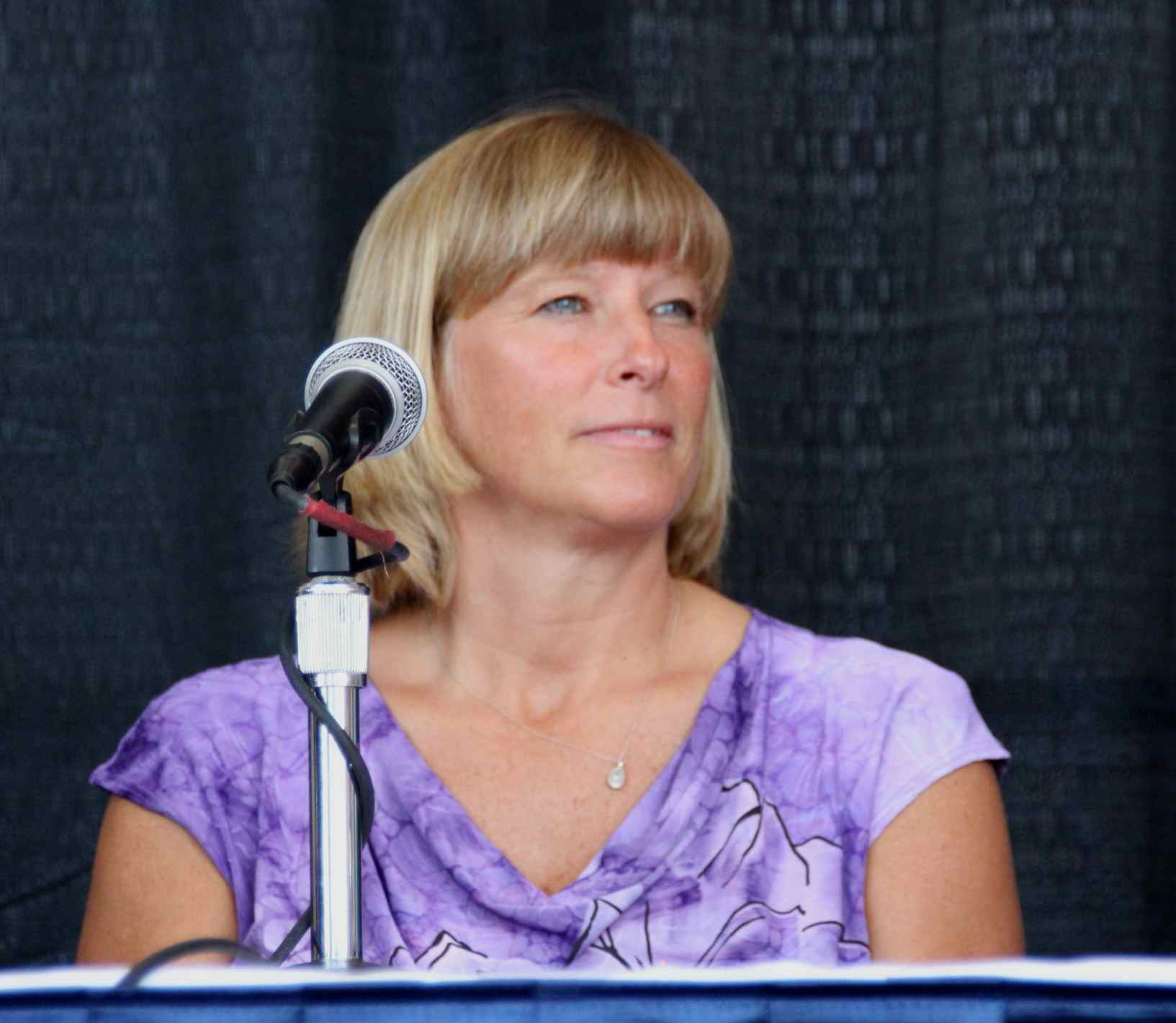

Current position
- Title: Head coach
- Team: USC Beaufort
- Conference: Peach Belt Conference

Biographical details
- Born: December 3, 1965 (age 60); Mishawaka, Indiana, U.S.

Playing career
- 1985–1987: Purdue
- Position: Point guard

Coaching career (HC unless noted)
- 1989–1993: Lawrence North HS
- 1993–1996: Benton Central Junior-Senior HS
- 1996–1997: Louisville (asst.)
- 1997–2000: James Madison (asst.)
- 2000–2005: Maine
- 2005–2006: Indiana
- 2006–2021: Purdue
- 2024–: USC Beaufort

Head coaching record
- Overall: 418–257 (.619)

Accomplishments and honors

Championships
- 4× Big Ten tournament championship (2007, 2008, 2012, 2013); America East tournament championship (2004)

Awards
- 2× America East Coach of the Year (2003, 2005); District VII Coach of the Year (2007); Indiana Miss Basketball (1984)

Sharon Versyp (born December 3, 1965) is an American former basketball player who is the head coach of the University of South Carolina Beaufort women's basketball team and the former head coach of the Purdue University women's basketball team from 2006 to 2021. She was Indiana's High School Miss Basketball in 1984 and an All-America at Purdue.

== High school career ==
Versyp played basketball at Mishawaka High School in Mishawaka, Indiana from 1980 to 1984. As a senior, the 5' 9" point guard averaged 23.8 points, 4.3 rebounds and 3.8 assists while leading the team to a 24–1 record. She scored 1,189 career points and led Mishawaka to a 58–9 record in her three years as a varsity player. She was named as the ninth Indiana Miss Basketball in 1984, leading the Indiana All-Star team to two victories over rival Kentucky. An outstanding volleyball player, Versyp also led her high school volleyball team to the state finals twice, including a state championship in 1983.

== Collegiate playing career ==
As a player, Versyp was a fixture in the Purdue starting lineup beginning her freshman year and is one of only seven four-year starters in Purdue women's basketball history. She led the team in scoring three straight seasons and still ranks fourth in single game assists (12), seventh in career assists (418) and 10th in career points (1,565). Versyp still has records in the top-10 all-time in 10 statistical categories. In 1988, Versyp was named All-Big Ten and CoSIDA All-American, and won honors as the school's women's athlete of the year. At Purdue, she led the team to three consecutive winning seasons at a time when the program had enjoyed only one winning campaign in the previous ten years of play.

== High school coaching career ==
After graduating from Purdue, Versyp became the head coach at Lawrence North High School in Indianapolis from 1989 to 1993, taking a 0–18 team to a sectional runner-up finish in two seasons. She also served as the head coach at Benton Central Junior-Senior High School in Oxford, Indiana from 1993 to 1996.

== Collegiate coaching career ==
Versyp entered the collegiate ranks in 1996–97, when she joined Bud Childers' staff at the University of Louisville. After going 20–9, sharing the Conference USA regular-season title and an earning NCAA berth, Childers left for James Madison University. Versyp joined him in Harrisonburg, Va., serving as his top assistant and recruiting coordinator. She was there for three seasons and in 1999 helped ink a recruiting class ranked nationally in the top 25.

=== Maine ===
In 2000, Versyp became the head coach at Maine for five seasons, where she amassed a 98–51 record, including 67–19 in America East Conference. Versyp's teams won three straight America East regular season championships (2003–05) and in 2004 also won the America East tournament title, earning an NCAA Tournament berth. Versyp was twice voted America East Coach of the Year (2003 and 2005). Her teams achieved season records of 25–6 in 2002–03 and 25–7 in 2003–04, which were the first back-to-back 25-win campaigns in school history. Under Versyp's guidance, Maine student-athletes earned America East, Rookie and Defensive Player of the year designations and garnered 15 all-conference honors in her five years with the Black Bears. Versyp coached 2003 and 2004 America East Player of the Year, Heather Ernest, who went on to play professionally overseas. While at Maine, Versyp's team ranked 13th in the Women's Basketball Coaches Association National Team Academic Honor Roll.

=== Indiana ===
Versyp took the head coaching job at Indiana University in 2005–06, where she led her team to a 19–14 season, 9–7 in the Big Ten and the quarterfinals of the post-season WNIT. The nine-game improvement was the second-largest turnaround in school history for a first-year head coach. While at Indiana, Versyp guided senior Cyndi Valentin to first team All-Big Ten honors and newcomer Whitney Thomas to the Big Ten All-Freshman team.

=== Purdue ===
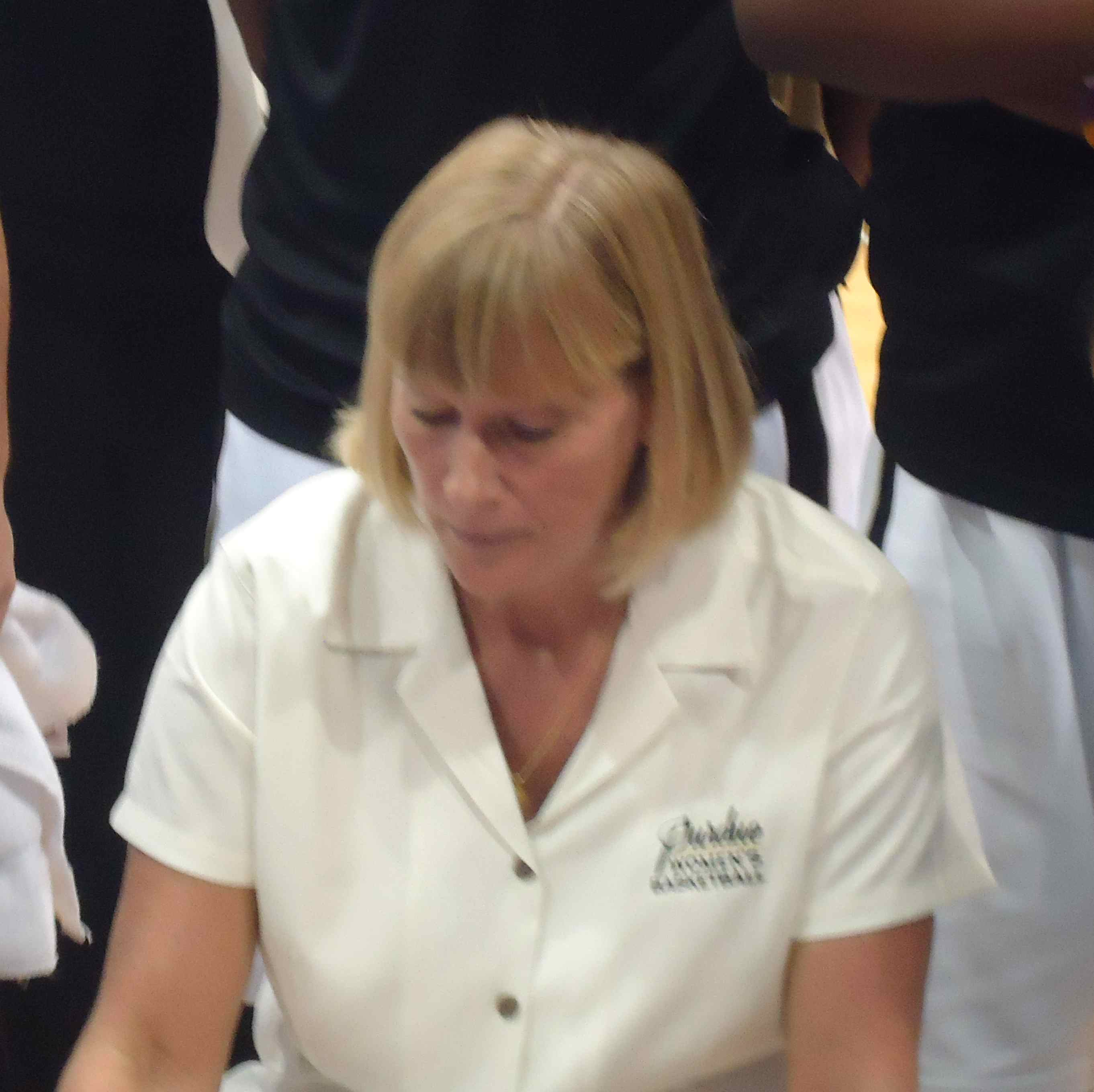
Sharon Versyp coaching on the sidelines at the Paradise Jam tournament in 2012

Versyp returned to her alma mater as Purdue's eighth head coach on April 10, 2006.

In her first year as head coach at Purdue, Versyp led the Boilermakers to a 31–6 record that included a second-place finish in the Big Ten regular season, a Big Ten tournament title and an appearance in the NCAA Elite Eight. Versyp was named the 2007 WBCA Region VI Coach of the Year for her achievements with the team. The former Boilermaker point guard has led her team to two Big Ten tournament championships and two NCAA Tournament Elite Eight appearances in her three years as head coach. She has compiled a 75–32 record (.701 win percentage), has won over 73 percent of Purdue's Big Ten Conference regular-season games and has led the Boilermakers to the Big Ten tournament championship game each year, winning twice. For two years in a row, the Lady Boilermakers have earned a team GPA of 3.14, an improvement of nearly half a point from the academic year prior to Versyp becoming Purdue's head coach.

On March 26, 2021; Purdue announced the 2021–2022 season will be the last year of the "Versyp Era" at Purdue, with Katie Gearlds joining the Lady Boilers staff and then succeeding Versyp as the head coach after the 2021–2022 season. The Journal & Courier reported on August 18, 2021, that Purdue University was investigating allegations that Versyp created a “toxic and hostile environment,” including verbally attacking players and bullying a member of her coaching staff. It was announced on September 16, 2021, that Versyp would be retiring and replaced by Gearlds a year earlier than originally planned.

=== University of South Carolina Beaufort ===
On October 26, 2022, Versyp announced she would return to coaching and begin building the University of South Carolina Beaufort's new women's basketball program. The Sandsharks inaugural season takes place during the 2023–24 season.

== Honors and awards ==
Versyp was inducted into the New England Basketball Hall of Fame in June 2013 for her accomplishments as head coach of the University of Maine women's basketball team, where her teams won the America East championships three consecutive years.

== Statistics ==
=== Purdue player ===
Legend
GP	Games played	GS	Games started	MPG	Minutes per game
FG%	Field goal percentage	3P%	3-point field goal percentage	FT%	Free throw percentage
RPG	Rebounds per game	APG	Assists per game	SPG	Steals per game
BPG	Blocks per game	PPG	Points per game	**Bold**	Career high

Year	Team	GP	Points	FG%	3P%	FT%	RPG	APG	SPG	BPG	PPG
1984-85	Purdue	28	345	45.8%	0.0%	68.1%	2.9	3.0	1.9	0.0	12.3
1985-86	Purdue	27	395	**47.0%**	0.0%	82.1%	**3.1**	3.3	1.7	0.0	**14.6**
1986-87	Purdue	27	357	46.6%	0.0%	**86.0%**	1.9	**4.3**	**1.7**	0.0	13.2
1987-88	Purdue	**31**	**468**	46.6%	**36.8%**	83.3%	3.0	4.1	1.6	0.0	15.1
Career	Purdue	113	1565	46.5%	36.8%	79.6%	2.7	3.7	1.7	0.0	13.8

=== Head coaching record ===
Record table
Season	Team	Overall	Conference	Standing	Postseason
**Maine Black Bears** (America East Conference) (2000–2005)
2000–01	Maine	12-16	9-9	T-5th	
2001–02	Maine	16-12	9-7	T-2nd	
2002–03	Maine	25-6	16-0	1st	WNIT First Round
2003–04	Maine	25-7	17-1	1st	NCAA 1st Round
2004–05	Maine	20-10	16-2	1st	WNIT First Round
Maine:		98-51 (.658)	67-19 (.779)		
**Indiana Hoosiers** (Big Ten Conference) (2005–2006)
2005–06	Indiana	19-14	9-7	6th	WNIT Quarterfinals
Indiana:		19-14 (.576)	9-7 (.563)		
**Purdue Boilermakers** (Big Ten Conference) (2006–2021)
2006–07	Purdue	31-6	14-2	2nd	NCAA Elite Eight
2007–08	Purdue	19-15	11-7	T-3rd	NCAA 2nd Round
2008–09	Purdue	25-11	13-5	T-2nd	NCAA Elite Eight
2009–10	Purdue	15-17	9-9	5th	WNIT Second Round
2010–11	Purdue	21-12	9-7	7th	NCAA 2nd Round
2011–12	Purdue	25-9	11-5	T-2nd	NCAA 2nd Round
2012–13	Purdue	25-9	10-6	4th	NCAA 2nd Round
2013–14	Purdue	22-9	11-5	T-4th	NCAA 2nd Round
2014–15	Purdue	11-20	3-15	T-13th	
2015–16	Purdue	20-12	10-8	6th	NCAA 1st Round
2016–17	Purdue	23-13	10-6	T-4th	NCAA 2nd Round
2017–18	Purdue	20-14	9-7	T-7th	WNIT Third Round
2018–19	Purdue	19-15	8–10	T-10th	
2019–20	Purdue	18-14	8–10	9th	
2020–21	Purdue	7–16	4–14	12th	
Purdue:		301–192 (.611)	141–116 (.549)		
Total:		418–257 (.619)			
National champion Postseason invitational champion Conference regular season champion Conference regular season and conference tournament champion Division regular season champion Division regular season and conference tournament champion Conference tournament champion
