= Purdue Boilermakers women's basketball =

2025–26 Purdue Boilermakers women's basketball team
- University: Purdue University
- Head coach: Katie Gearlds (5th season)
- Location: West Lafayette, Indiana
- Arena: Mackey Arena (capacity: 14,804)
- Conference: Big Ten
- Nickname: Boilermakers
- Colors: Old gold and black
- Student section: KG Unit

NCAA Division I tournament champions
- 1999
Other NCAA Division I tournament results
Runner-up	2001
Final Four	1994, 1999, 2001
Elite Eight	1994, 1995, 1998, 1999, 2001, 2003, 2007, 2009
Sweet Sixteen	1990, 1992, 1994, 1995, 1998, 1999, 2001, 2003, 2004, 2006, 2007, 2009
Appearances	1989, 1990, 1991, 1992, 1994, 1995, 1996, 1997, 1998, 1999, 2000, 2001, 2002, 2003, 2004, 2005, 2006, 2007, 2008, 2009, 2011, 2012, 2013, 2014, 2016, 2017, 2023

Conference tournament champions
- 1998, 1999, 2000, 2003, 2004, 2007, 2008, 2012, 2013

Conference regular-season champions
- 1991, 1994, 1995, 1997, 1999, 2001, 2002

Uniforms
Home	Away	Alternate

The Purdue Boilermakers women's basketball team is a college basketball program that competes in NCAA Division I and the Big Ten Conference.

Purdue is rich in tradition and history, holding the record for Big Ten women's basketball tournament championships, along with annually ranking in the top 10 nationally in home attendance. The Boilermakers have appeared in the NCAA Final Four three times, and won the NCAA National Championship in 1999. The Boilermakers share a classic rivalry with the Indiana Hoosiers, of which Purdue owns a 52–27 series lead.

== History ==
In 1975, women's basketball became an intercollegiate sport at Purdue University. In 1982, the sport was elevated to revenue status, which meant more money was available. Under Coach Lin Dunn, Purdue qualified for its first NCAA Tournament game in 1989. Ten years later, Purdue won its first national championship by beating Duke University in the title game. Sharon Versyp, a former Purdue standout, was introduced as the head coach at the start of the 2006 season.

== Current coaching staff ==
- Katie Gearlds - Head Coach
- Beth Couture - Associate Coach
- Michael Scruggs - Assistant Coach/Recruiting Coordinator
- Alex Guyton - Assistant Coach
- Jaelen Nice - Graduate Assistant
- Karmell Brown - Graduate Assistant
- Jessica Lipsett - Trainer
- Jason Pullara - Strength Coach

== Year by year results ==
Conference tournament winners noted with # Source

Season	Team	Overall	Conference	Standing	Postseason	Coaches' poll	AP poll
Unknown (CIAW) (1968–1969)
1968-69	Unknown	–	–		CIAW Tenth Place		
:		–	–				
Big Ten Conference
Deborah Gebhardt (Big Ten) (1975–1976)
1975-76	Deborah Gephardt	8–8	2–3	3	IAIAW		
Deborah Gephardt:		8–8	2–3				
Ruth Jones (Big Ten) (1976–1986)
1976-77	Ruth Jones	7–16	2–4	7th	IAIAW		
1977-78	Ruth Jones	13–7	1–2	T-5th	IAIAW		
1978-79	Ruth Jones	7–19	0–1	T-7th	IAIAW		
1979-80	Ruth Jones	4–18	0–1	T-6th	IAIAW		
1980-81	Ruth Jones	14–18	0–1	T-7th	IAIAW - 2nd		
1981-82	Ruth Jones	13–17	0–1	T-7th	IAIAW - 1st; MAIAW - 3rd		
1982-83	Ruth Jones	10–16	3–15	8th			
1983-84	Ruth Jones	5–23	1–17	10th			
1984-85	Ruth Jones	12–16	6–12	T-7th			
1985-86	Ruth Jones	16–11	9–9	T-5th			
Ruth Jones:		101–161	22–63				
Marsha Reall (Big Ten) (1986–1987)
1986-87	Marsha Reall	18–9	10–8	5th			
Marsha Reall:		18–9	10–8				
Lin Dunn (Big Ten) (1987–1996)
1987-88	Lin Dunn	21–10	13–5	3rd	NWIT Second Place		
1988-89	Lin Dunn	24–6	14–4	3rd	NCAA second round (Bye)	17	15
1989-90	Lin Dunn	23–7	14–4	3rd	NCAA Sweet Sixteen	14	15
1990-91	Lin Dunn	26–3	17–1	1st	NCAA second round (Bye)	14	5
1991-92	Lin Dunn	23–7	14–4	2nd	NCAA Sweet Sixteen	16	11
1992-93	Lin Dunn	16–11	8–10	6th			
1993-94	Lin Dunn	29–5	16–2	T-1st	NCAA Final Four	3	8
1994-95	Lin Dunn	24–8	13–3	T-1st	NCAA Elite Eight	9	16
1995-96	Lin Dunn	20–11	11–5	4th	NCAA first round		15
Lin Dunn:		206–68	120–38				
Nell Fortner (Big Ten) (1996–1997)
1996-97	Nell Fortner	17–11	12–4	T-1st	NCAA second round	23	
Nell Fortner:		17–11	12–4				
Carolyn Peck (Big Ten) (1997–1999)
1997-98	Carolyn Peck	23–10	10–6	T-3rd#	NCAA Elite Eight	11	21
1998-99	Carolyn Peck	34–1	16–0	1st#	NCAA Champions	1	1
Carolyn Peck:		57–11	26–6				
Kristy Curry (Big Ten) (1999–2006)
1999-2000	Kristy Curry	23–8	11–5	T-3rd#	NCAA second round	16	13
2000-01	Kristy Curry	31–7	14–2	1st	NCAA Runner-up	2	9
2001-02	Kristy Curry	24–6	13–3	1st	NCAA second round	14	9
2002-03	Kristy Curry	29–6	12–4	T-2nd#	NCAA Elite Eight	7	10
2003-04	Kristy Curry	29–4	14–2	2nd#	NCAA Sweet Sixteen	9	3
2004-05	Kristy Curry	17–13	9–7	5th	NCAA second round		
2005-06	Kristy Curry	26–7	13–3	2nd	NCAA Sweet Sixteen	11	11
Kristy Curry:		179–51	86–26				
Sharon Versyp (Big Ten) (2006–2021)
2006-07	Sharon Versyp	31–6	14–2	2nd#	NCAA Elite Eight	7	11
2007-08	Sharon Versyp	19–15	11–7	T-3rd#	NCAA second round		
2008-09	Sharon Versyp	25–11	13–5	T-2nd	NCAA Elite Eight	16	
2009–10	Sharon Versyp	15–17	9–9	5th	WNIT second round		
2010-11	Sharon Versyp	21–12	9–7	7th	NCAA second round		
2011-12	Sharon Versyp	25–9	11–5	T-2nd#	NCAA second round	18	13
2012-13	Sharon Versyp	25–9	10–6	T-3rd#	NCAA second round	21	20
2013–14	Sharon Versyp	22–9	11–5	T-4th	NCAA second round	21	19
2014–15	Sharon Versyp	11–20	3–15	T-13th			
2015–16	Sharon Versyp	20–12	10–8	6th	NCAA first round		
2016–17	Sharon Versyp	23–13	10–5	T-4th	NCAA second round		
2017–18	Sharon Versyp	18–13	9–7	T-7th	WNIT second round		
2018–19	Sharon Versyp	19–15	8–10	T-10th			
2019–20	Sharon Versyp	18–14	8–10	9th			
2020–21	Sharon Versyp	7–16	4–14	12th			
Sharon Versyp:		301–192	141–116				
Katie Gearlds (Big Ten) (2021–present)
2021–22	Katie Gearlds	17–15	7–11	9th	WNIT Second Round		
2022–23	Katie Gearlds	19–11	9–8	7th	NCAA First Four		
2023–24	Katie Gearlds	15–19	5-13	12th			
2024–25	Katie Gearlds	10–19	3-15	15th			
Katie Gearlds:		61–64	24–47				
Total:		946–574	437–300				
National champion Postseason invitational champion Conference regular season champion Conference regular season and conference tournament champion Division regular season champion Division regular season and conference tournament champion Conference tournament champion

== NCAA tournament results ==
Purdue has made the NCAA Division I women's basketball tournament 27 times. They have a record of 47–26 with a championship won in 1999.

Year	Seed	Round	Opponent	Result
1989	#5	First Round; Second Round	#12 Arkansas #4 LSU	W 91–63; L 53–54
1990	#4	Second Round; Sweet Sixteen	#5 Northern Illinois #1 Louisiana Tech	W 86–81; L 47–91
1991	#2	Second Round	#10 Vanderbilt	L 63–69
1992	#3	Second Round; Sweet Sixteen	#11 Northern Illinois #2 Maryland	W 98–62; L 58–64
1994	#1	First Round; Second Round; Sweet Sixteen; Elite Eight; Final Four	#16 Radford #8 Washington #13 Texas A&M #2 Stanford #3 North Carolina	W 103–56; W 86–59; W 82–56; W 82–65; L 74–89
1995	#4	First Round; Second Round; Sweet Sixteen; Elite Eight	#13 Portland #12 Montana #1 Vanderbilt #2 Stanford	W 74–59; W 62–51; W 67–66; L 58–69
1996	#5	First Round	#12 Notre Dame	L 60–73
1997	#8	First Round; Second Round	#9 Maryland #1 Old Dominion	W 74–48; L 65–69
1998	#4	First Round; Second Round; Sweet Sixteen; Elite Eight	#13 Washington #12 Colorado State #9 Notre Dame #3 Louisiana Tech	W 88–71; W 77–63; W 70–65; L 65–72
1999	#1	First Round; Second Round; Sweet Sixteen; Elite Eight; Final Four; Title Game	#16 Oral Roberts #9 Kansas #4 North Carolina #3 Rutgers #1 Louisiana Tech #3 Duke	W 68–48; W 55–41; W 82–59; W 75–62; W 77–63; W 62–45
2000	#4	First Round; Second Round	#13 Dartmouth #5 Oklahoma	W 70–66; L 74–76
2001	#3	First Round; Second Round; Sweet Sixteen; Elite Eight; Final Four; Title Game	#14 UC Santa Barbara #6 LSU #2 Texas Tech #4 Xavier #5 SW Missouri State #1 Notre Dame	W 75–62; W 73–70; W 74–72; W 88–78; W 81–64; L 66–68
2002	#2	First Round; Second Round	#15 Austin Peay #7 Old Dominion	W 80–49; L 70–74 (OT)
2003	#2	First Round; Second Round; Sweet Sixteen; Elite Eight	#15 Valparaiso #7 Virginia Tech #11 Notre Dame #1 Connecticut	W 66–51; W 80–62; W 66–47; L 64–73
2004	#2	First Round; Second Round; Sweet Sixteen	#15 St. Francis (PA) #7 Villanova #3 Georgia	W 78–59; W 60–42; L 64–66
2005	#9	First Round; Second Round	#8 New Mexico #1 Tennessee	W 68–56; L 54–75
2006	#4	First Round; Second Round; Sweet Sixteen	#13 Missouri State #5 UCLA #1 North Carolina	W 73–54; W 61–54; L 68–70
2007	#2	First Round; Second Round; Sweet Sixteen; Elite Eight	#15 Oral Roberts #7 Georgia Tech #3 Georgia #1 North Carolina	W 63–42; W 76–63; W 78–65; L 72–84
2008	#9	First Round; Second Round	#8 Utah #1 Tennessee	W 66–59; L 52–78
2009	#6	First Round; Second Round; Sweet Sixteen; Elite Eight	#11 Charlotte #3 North Carolina #7 Rutgers #1 Oklahoma	W 65–52; W 85–70; W 67–61; L 68–74
2011	#9	First Round; Second Round	#8 Kansas State #1 Connecticut	W 53–45; L 40–64
2012	#4	First Round; Second Round	#13 South Dakota State #5 South Carolina	W 83–68; L 61–72
2013	#4	First Round; Second Round	#13 Liberty #5 Louisville	W 77–43; L 63–76
2014	#4	First Round; Second Round	#13 Liberty #5 Louisville	W 84–55; L 66–73
2016	#11	First Round	#6 Oklahoma	L 45–61
2017	#9	First Round; Second Round	#8 Green Bay #1 Notre Dame	W 74–62; L 82–88 (OT)
2023	#11	First Four	#11 St. John's	L 64–66

== National awards ==
=== National Player of the Year (2) ===
- MaChelle Joseph (1992)
- Stephanie White (1999)

=== Wade Trophy (1) ===
- Stephanie White (1999)

=== All-American Consensus Selections (7) ===
- Joy Holmes (1991)
- MaChelle Joseph (1992)
- Stacey Lovelace (1995)
- Stephanie White (1999)
- Katie Douglas (2000, 2001)
- Shereka Wright (2004)

=== Academic All-American First Team Selections (5) ===
- Sue Bartz (1982)
- Carol Emanuel (1983)
- Stephanie White (1999)
- Camille Cooper (2001)
- Katie Douglas (2001)
- Candice Hall (2001)

=== National Coach of the Year (1) ===
- Carolyn Peck (1999)

== Big Ten awards ==
=== Player of the Year (8) ===
- Joy Holmes (1991)
- MaChelle Joseph (1992)
- Stacey Lovelace (1995)
- Jannon Roland (1997)
- Stephanie White (1999)
- Katie Douglas (2000, 2001)
- Shereka Wright (2004)

=== Suzy Favor Female Athlete of the Year (4) ===
- Joy Holmes (1991)
- MaChelle Joseph (1992)
- Stephanie White (1999)
- Katie Douglas (2001)

=== Chicago Tribune Silver Basketball Recipient (6) ===
- Joy Holmes (1991)
- MaChelle Joseph (1992)
- Stacey Lovelace (1995)
- Jannon Roland (1997)
- Stephanie White (1999)
- Katie Douglas (2001)

=== Defensive Player of the Year (4) ===
- Kelly Komara (2002)
- Lindsay Wisdom-Hylton (2007)
- Ae'Rianna Harris (2018, 2019) - the first two-time winner in Purdue history.

=== 6th Player of the Year (2) ===
- Brittany Rayburn (2009)
- Whitney Bays (2014)

=== Freshman of the Year (4) ===
- MaChelle Joseph (1989)
- Leslie Johnson (1994)
- Katie Gearlds (2004)
- Mary Ashley Stevenson (2024)

=== Coach of the Year (5) ===
- Ruth Jones (1986)
- Lin Dunn (1989,1991)
- Nell Fortner (1997)
- Carolyn Peck (1999)

== All-time records ==
=== Big Ten win/loss records (as of 2015 regular season) ===
- Illinois: 52–17
- Indiana: 52–27
- Iowa: 36–30
- Maryland: 1–5
- Michigan: 50–18
- Michigan State: 38–29
- Minnesota: 43–19
- Nebraska: 5–2
- Northwestern: 45–21
- Ohio State: 28–43
- Penn State: 27–19
- Rutgers: 2–2
- Wisconsin: 48–18

=== Career records ===
- Most Points: MaChelle Joseph - 2,405 (1989–91)
- Most Rebounds: Stacey Lovelace - 876 (1993–96)
- Most Assists: MaChelle Joseph - 628 (1989–91)
- Most Steals: Katie Douglas - 327 (1998–01)
- Most Blocks: Ae’Rianna Harris - 350 (2016–20)
- Most 3-Point Field Goals: Katie Gearlds - 238 (2003–07)

=== Single season records ===
- Most Points: Stephanie White (1998–99) / Katie Gearlds (2006–07) - 707
- Most Rebounds: Leslie Johnson - 306 (1993–94)
- Most Assists: Lisa Jahner - 201 (1987–88)
- Most Steals: Kelly Komara - 120 (2001–02)
- Most Blocks: Lindsay Wisdom-Hylton - 108 (2006–07)
- Most 3-Point Field Goals: Katie Gearlds - 88 (2006–07)

=== Single game records ===
- Most Points: Katie Gearlds - 41 (2007)
- Most Rebounds: Leslie Schultz - 25 (1981)
- Most Assists: MaChelle Joseph - 16 (1992)
- Most Steals: Joy Holmes - 12 (1989)

== See also ==
- 1999 NCAA Division I women's basketball tournament
- List of teams with the most victories in NCAA Division I women's college basketball
