= Lin Dunn =

American basketball executive and former coach

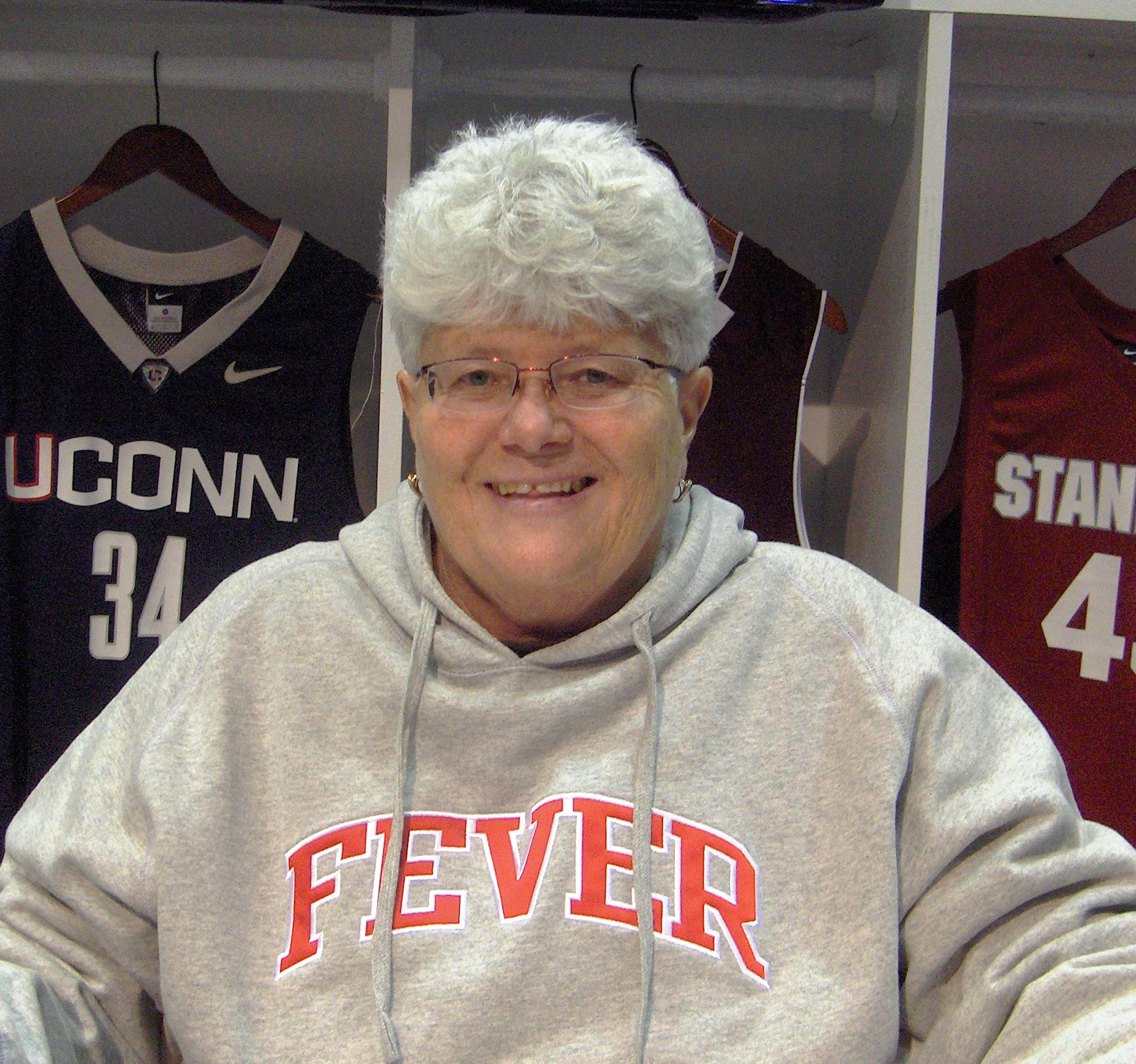

Indiana Fever
- Position: Senior advisor
- League: WNBA

Personal information
- Born: May 10, 1947 (age 79) Dresden, Tennessee, U.S.

Career information
- College: Tennessee–Martin
- Coaching career: 1970–2022

Career history

Coaching
- 1970–1976: Austin Peay State
- 1977–1978: Ole Miss
- 1978–1987: Miami (FL)
- 1987–1996: Purdue
- 1997–1998: Portland Power
- 2000–2002: Seattle Storm
- 2004–2007: Indiana Fever (assistant)
- 2008–2014: Indiana Fever
- 2016–2022: Kentucky (assistant/spec asst)
- 2022–2024: Indiana Fever (general manager)
- 2025–present: Indiana Fever (senior advisor)

Career highlights
- WNBA Champion (2012); 2× WNBA All–Star Game Head Coach (2009, 2013)
- Women's Basketball Hall of Fame
Medals
Women's basketball
Head coach for United States
William Jones Cup
Bronze medal – third place	1995 Taipei	Team competition
Assistant coach for United States
Olympic Games
Bronze medal – third place	1992 Barcelona	Team competition
FIBA World Championship for Women
Gold medal – first place	1990 Kuala Lumpur	Team competition
Goodwill Games
Gold medal – first place	1990 Seattle	Team competition

Lin Dunn (born May 10, 1947) is an American women's basketball executive and former coach, who is currently a senior advisor with the Indiana Fever of the WNBA. She was recently the general manager of the Fever. She is most known for being the first coach and general manager for the Seattle Storm. She guided Indiana Fever to their first ever WNBA title. She has more than 500 wins to her name.

== Early life and education ==
A native of Dresden, Tennessee, Lin Dunn was the firstborn of four children to mother Whit LaRue and father Harry Dunn. Her siblings are brother Harry Jr., and sisters Carrie and Mary. Their father died from a stroke when Linn was a college freshman and her mother in 2012. Their maternal grandparents in Dresden were county judge and Baptist pastor Thomas Cayce Pentecost and her grandmother, who jointly owned the family home where the kids spent their childhood summers.

Lin Dunn graduated from the University of Tennessee at Martin in 1969.

== College career ==
Dunn coached for decades in the college ranks, amassing a 447–257 record in 25 seasons as a college head coach. In her tenure at Austin Peay State University (1970–1976), the University of Mississippi (1977–1978), the University of Miami (1978–1987) and Purdue University (1987–1996), she made the NCAA Women's Division I Basketball Championship seven times, and the Final Four once, in 1994 with Purdue. She is in the Athletics Hall of Fame at both Austin Peay and Miami. Dunn also was president of the Women's Basketball Coaches Association in 1984–85.

Dunn was fired at Purdue after the 1995–96 season, and she moved up to the professional game.

== Pro basketball career ==
Dunn coached the American Basketball League's Portland Power beginning in 1996. She was ABL's coach of the year for 1998, right before that league folded.

Dunn then became the first coach and GM of the expansion Seattle Storm club in ABL's rival, the Women's National Basketball Association. The team started with a dismal 6–26 season, and Dunn left the Storm just as it was starting to have success. New superstars Lauren Jackson and Sue Bird led the team to the 2002 playoffs, where they were swept by the Los Angeles Sparks. Dunn resigned, leaving the path open for Anne Donovan to build a team that won the championship two seasons later.

Dunn worked as the head coach of the Indiana Fever. She won the WNBA championship with the Fever on October 21, 2012.

On May 6, 2014, Dunn announced that she'd retire from coaching at the end of the year.

On June 14, 2014, Dunn was inducted into the Women's Basketball Hall of Fame.

On May 24, 2016, she was introduced as an assistant coach for Matthew Mitchell at Kentucky. On May 26, 2017, UK Athletics announced that Coach Dunn had signed a one-year contract extension.

In 2018, she was promoted to Kentucky's head coach.

== Management ==
On February 14, 2022, Dunn left her position at the Wildcats to take over Interim General Manager of the Indiana Fever. In explaining her decision, she stated, "I wouldn't come back to another franchise. This would be the only place that I would consider coming out of retirement for."

Dunn was named the permanent General Manager of the Indiana Fever on January 20, 2023.

On October 4, 2024, Dunn moved to a senior advisor position.

== USA Basketball ==
In 1990, Dunn was the assistant coach for the USA National team at the World Championships in Kuala Lumpur, Malaysia. The team, with Teresa Edwards scoring 22 points per game, won all eight contests, with only the win over Cuba decided by single digits. The USA team faced Yugoslavia in the gold-medal final game, and won 88–78.

In 1995, Dunn served as the head coach to the R. William Jones Cup Team. The competition was held in Taipei, Taiwan. The USA team won its first six games, four of the six won by single-digit margins. Their seventh game was against Russia, and they were defeated 100–84. The final game was against South Korea, and a victory would assure the gold medal, but the South Korean team won 80–76 to win the gold. The USA team won the bronze medal.

== Head coaching record ==
=== College ===
Record table
Season	Team	Overall	Conference	Standing	Postseason
Austin Peay Lady Governors (Ohio Valley Conference) (1970–1976)
Austin Peay:		67–55 (.549)			
Ole Miss Rebels (Southeastern Conference) (1977–1978)
1977–78	Ole Miss	25–15	N/A		AIAW State Tournament Champion; AIAW Region III Runner-up; AIAW National Tournament
Ole Miss:		25–15 (.625)			
Miami Hurricanes (FAIAW) (1978–1982)
1978–79	Miami (FL)	10–13	N/A		
1979–80	Miami (FL)	18–16	N/A		
1980–81	Miami (FL)	24–15	N/A		
1981–82	Miami (FL)	19–10	N/A		
Miami Hurricanes (NCAA Division I independent) (1982–1987)
1982–83	Miami (FL)	14–13	N/A		
1983–84	Miami (FL)	19–12	N/A		
1984–85	Miami (FL)	21–7	N/A		
1985–86	Miami (FL)	9–18	N/A		
1986–87	Miami (FL)	15–15	N/A		
Miami (FL):		149–119 (.556)			
Purdue Boilermakers (Big Ten Conference) (1987–1996)
1987–88	Purdue	21–10	13–5	3rd	NWIT Second Place
1988–89	Purdue	24–6	14–4	3rd	NCAA Second Round (Bye)
1989–90	Purdue	23–7	14–4	3rd	NCAA Sweet Sixteen
1990–91	Purdue	26–3	17–1	1st	NCAA Second Round (Bye)
1991–92	Purdue	23–7	14–4	2nd	NCAA Sweet Sixteen
1992–93	Purdue	16–11	8–10	6th	
1993–94	Purdue	29–5	16–2	T-1st	NCAA Final Four
1994–95	Purdue	24–8	13–3	T-1st	NCAA Elite Eight
1995–96	Purdue	20–11	11–5	4th	NCAA First Round
Purdue:		206–68 (.752)			
Total:		447–257 (.635)			
National champion Postseason invitational champion Conference regular season champion Conference regular season and conference tournament champion Division regular season champion Division regular season and conference tournament champion Conference tournament champion

=== Professional ===
Legend
Regular season	G	Games coached	W	Games won	L	Games lost	W–L %	Win–loss %
Playoffs	PG	Playoff games	PW	Playoff wins	PL	Playoff losses	PW–L %	Playoff win–loss %

Team	Year	G	W	L	W–L%	Finish	PG	PW	PL	PW–L%	Result
POR	1996–97	18	9	9	.500	4th in West					
POR	1997–98	44	27	17	.614	1st in West	2	0	2	.000	Lost Western Conference Semi-Finals
POR	1998	13	9	4	.692	Season cancelled					
SEA	2000	32	6	26	.188	8th in West					
SEA	2001	32	10	22	.313	8th in West					
SEA	2002	32	17	15	.531	4th in West	2	0	2	.000	Lost Western Conference Semi-Finals
IND	2008	34	17	17	.500	4th in East	3	1	2	.333	Lost Eastern Conference Semi-Finals
IND	2009	34	22	12	.647	1st in East	10	6	4	.600	Lost WNBA Finals
IND	2010	34	21	13	.618	3rd in East	3	1	2	.333	Lost Eastern Conference Semi-Finals
IND	2011	34	21	13	.618	1st in East	6	3	3	.500	Lost Eastern Conference Finals
IND	2012	34	22	12	.647	2nd in East	10	7	3	.700	Won WNBA Finals
IND	2013	34	16	18	.471	4th in East	4	2	2	.500	Lost Eastern Conference Finals
IND	2014	34	16	18	.471	2nd in East	5	3	2	.600	Lost Eastern Conference Finals
Career		409	213	196	.521		45	23	22	.511	

== Personal life ==
Dunn has been an early and lifelong advocate and fighter for women's equality in sports and in general. She has founded a consulting organization, titled Coaches for Coaches, to train, mentor, and guide women coaches on athletic programs.

Dunn is a lesbian and an advocate for LGBTQ rights. She's in a relationship with partner Fran Robinson.
