= 2013–14 Pepperdine Waves women's basketball team =

Intercollegiate basketball season

2013–14 Pepperdine Waves women's basketball
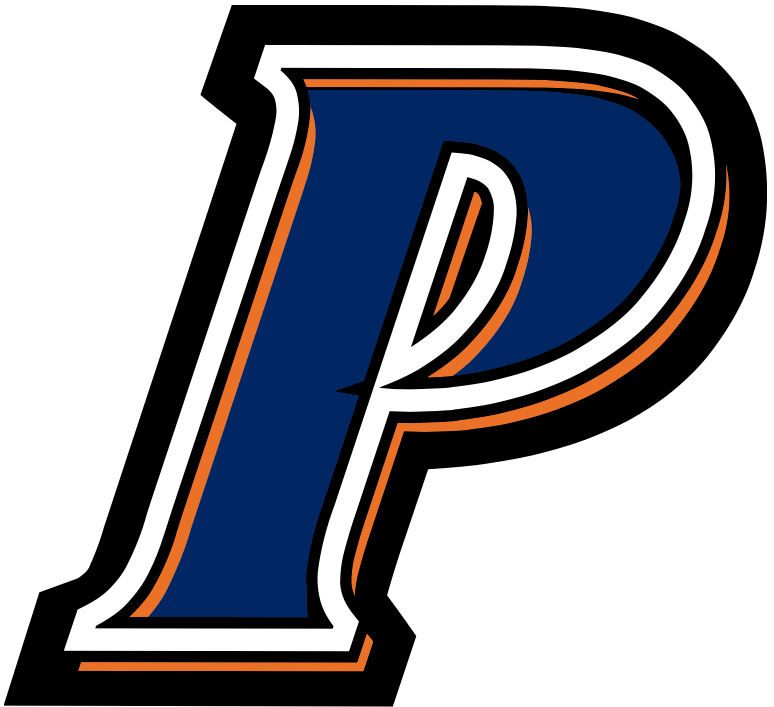
- Conference: West Coast Conference
- Record: 6–25 (1–17 WCC)
- Head coach: Ryan Weisenberg (1st season)
- Assistant coaches: Trisha Raniewicz; Mallorie Winn; Jordan Adams-Smith
- Home arena: Firestone Fieldhouse

2013–14 West Coast Conference women's basketball standings
	Conf.				Overall
Team	W		L	PCT	W		L	PCT
No. 18 Gonzaga†	16	–	2	.889	29	–	5	.853
BYU	14	–	4	.778	28	–	7	.800
Pacific	12	–	6	.667	18	–	13	.581
Saint Mary's	11	–	7	.611	23	–	10	.697
San Diego	11	–	7	.611	24	–	9	.727
Portland	7	–	11	.389	14	–	16	.467
Santa Clara	6	–	12	.333	10	–	20	.333
San Francisco	6	–	12	.333	12	–	19	.387
Loyola Marymount	6	–	12	.333	9	–	21	.300
Pepperdine	1	–	17	.056	6	–	25	.194
† 2014 WCC tournament winner As of March 29, 2014; Rankings from AP Poll

The 2013–14 Pepperdine Waves women's basketball team represented Pepperdine University in the 2013–14 college basketball season. The Waves, members of the West Coast Conference, were led by new head coach Ryan Weisenberg. The Waves played their home games at the Firestone Fieldhouse on the university campus in Malibu, California. They would finish the season 6–25 and in tenth place in the WCC, but they did advance to the WCC Quarterfinals after pulling a 1st Round upset.

== Roster ==
2013–14 Pepperdine Waves women's basketball team
Players
Coaches

Pos.	#	Name	Height	Year	Previous school	Hometown
G	2	Alexis Perry	5 ft 5 in (1.65 m)	RS So	Brea Olinda; UCLA	Cerritos, CA
G	4	Grace Leah Baughn	5 ft 11 in (1.8 m)	Jr	Wesleyan School	Norcross, GA
G	5	Alisha Roberts	5 ft 7 in (1.7 m)	So	York House School	Burnaby, British Columbia
G	10	Bria Richardson	5 ft 8 in (1.73 m)	Jr	Serra	Hawthorne, CA
G	11	Ea Shoushtari	5 ft 8 in (1.73 m)	Jr	Los Angeles Center for Enriched Studies	Los Angeles, CA
F	15	Amanda Lovely	6 ft 1 in (1.85 m)	So	Archbishop Mitty	Palo Alto, CA
F/C	25	Tessa Emerson	6 ft 2 in (1.88 m)	Jr	Santa Barbara	Santa Barbara, CA
C	32	Erica Chandler	6 ft 4 in (1.93 m)	Jr	Ardrey Kell High School; George Washington	Charlotte, NC
F	44	Kelsey Brockway	6 ft 1 in (1.85 m)	Fr	Palos Verdes	Rolling Hills, CA
G/F	51	Keitra Wallace	5 ft 11 in (1.8 m)	Fr	Brea Olinda	Brea, CA
G		Allie Green	5 ft 10 in (1.78 m)	Fr	Sacramento Charter	Sacramento, CA
G		Jaya Schultz	5 ft 11 in (1.8 m)	Fr	Canyon	Santa Clarita, CA
F		Haley Videck	6 ft 0 in (1.83 m)	So	Bartlett; Arizona State	Bartlett, IL

Head coach

- Ryan Weisenberg (Cal Poly)

Assistant coach(es)

- Trisha Raniewicz (Cal State San Bernardino)
- Mallorie Winn (Pittsburgh)
- Jordan Adams-Smith (New Mexico)

Legend

- (C) Team captain
- (S) Suspended
- (I) Ineligible
- (W) Walk-on
- Injured
- Current redshirt

Roster

== Schedule ==
Date time, TV	Rank^{#}	Opponent^{#}	Result	Record	Site city, state
Exhibition
10/30/2013*; 7:00 pm, TV-32		Westmont	W 57–55	–	Firestone Fieldhouse; Malibu, CA
Non-conference Regular Season
11/08/2013*; 7:00 pm		at Seattle	W 84–73	1–0	Connolly Center; Seattle, WA
11/11/2013*; 2:00 pm, P12 Digital		at UCLA	L 78–82	1–1	Pauley Pavilion; Los Angeles, CA
11/14/2013*; 7:00 pm, TV-32		UC Irvine	W 76–59	2–1	Firestone Fieldhouse; Malibu, CA
11/21/2013*; 5:00 pm		at South Dakota State	L 55–88	2–2	Frost Arena; Brookings, SD
11/23/2013*; 5:00 pm, MW Net		at Wyoming	L 64–84	2–3	Arena-Auditorium; Laramie, WY
11/25/2013*; 7:00 pm, P12 Digital		at Oregon	L 80–83	2–4	Matthew Knight Arena; Eugene, OR
11/30/2013*; 2:00 pm, BigWest.tv		at Long Beach State	L 61–74	2–5	Walter Pyramid; Long Beach, CA
12/03/2013*; 7:00 pm, TV-32		UC Santa Barbara	L 69–77	2–6	Firestone Fieldhouse; Malibu, CA
12/06/2013*; 7:00 pm, BigWest.tv		at UC Riverside	W 81–68	3–6	UC Riverside Student Recreation Center; Riverside, CA
12/16/2013*; 7:00 pm, TV-32		Cal Poly	L 77–80	3–7	Firestone Fieldhouse; Malibu, CA
12/21/2013*; 3:30 pm, TV-32		Northern Arizona	W 71–43	4–7	Firestone Fieldhouse; Malibu, CA
WCC Regular Season
12/28/2013; 2:00 pm, USD TV		at San Diego	L 43–71	4–8 (0–1)	Jenny Craig Pavilion; Malibu, CA
12/30/2013; 4:00 pm, BYUtv		at BYU	L 50–65	4–9 (0–2)	Marriott Center; Provo, UT
01/02/2014; 7:00 pm, TV-32		Santa Clara	W 100–93 ^{2OT}	5–9 (1–2)	Firestone Fieldhouse; Malibu, CA
01/04/2014; 2:00 pm, TV-32		San Francisco	L 61–77	5–10 (1–3)	Firestone Fieldhouse; Malibu, CA
01/11/2014; 2:00 pm, TV-32		Loyola Marymount	L 64–76	5–11 (1–4)	Firestone Fieldhouse; Malibu, CA
01/16/2014; 6:00 pm		at Saint Mary's	L 48–71	5–12 (1–5)	McKeon Pavilion; Moraga, CA
01/18/2014; 2:00 pm, TheW.tv		at Pacific	L 64–75	5–13 (1–6)	Alex G. Spanos Center; Stockton, CA
01/23/2014; 7:00 pm, TV-32		Portland	L 43–53	5–14 (1–7)	Firestone Fieldhouse; Malibu, CA
01/25/2014; 2:00 pm, TV-32		No. 25 Gonzaga	L 39–69	5–15 (1–8)	Firestone Fieldhouse; Malibu, CA
02/01/2014; 2:00 pm		at Loyola Marymount	L 74–90	5–16 (1–9)	McKeon Pavilion; Los Angeles, CA
02/06/2014; 6:00 pm		at No. 22 Gonzaga	L 51–86	5–17 (1–10)	McCarthey Athletic Center; Spokane, WA
02/08/2014; 2:00 pm		at Portland	L 59–78	5–18 (1–11)	Chiles Center; Portland, OR
02/13/2014; 7:00 pm, TV-32		Pacific	L 67–91	5–19 (1–12)	Firestone Fieldhouse; Malibu, CA
02/15/2014; 2:00 pm, TV-32		Saint Mary's	L 61–74	5–20 (1–13)	Firestone Fieldhouse; Malibu, CA
02/20/2014; 7:00 pm, TV-32		BYU	L 75–89	5–21 (1–14)	Firestone Fieldhouse; Malibu, CA
02/22/2014; 2:00 pm, TV-32		San Diego	L 46–73	5–22 (1–15)	Firestone Fieldhouse; Malibu, CA
02/27/2014; 7:00 pm		at San Francisco	L 61–75	5–23 (1–16)	War Memorial Gymnasium; San Francisco, CA
03/01/2014; 2:00 pm		at Santa Clara	L 61–67	5–24 (1–17)	Leavey Center; Santa Clara, CA
2014 West Coast Conference women's basketball tournament
03/06/2014; 12:00 pm, BYUtv		vs. Santa Clara; WCC Tournament 1st Round	W 80–74	6–24	Orleans Arena; Paradise, NV
03/07/2014; 2:00 pm, BYUtv		vs. BYU; WCC Tournament Quarterfinals	L 51–77	6–25	Orleans Arena; Paradise, NV
*Non-conference game. ^{#}Rankings from AP Poll. (#) Tournament seedings in parentheses. All times are in Pacific Time.

== Game summaries ==
=== Exhibition: Westmont ===
Broadcaster: Josh Perigo

TV-32

Oct 30
7:00 pm PDT

Recap

Westmont Warriors 55, Pepperdine Waves 57
Scoring by half: 29-29, 26-28
Pts: Esther Lee 13; Rebs: Kelsie Sampson 9 Asts: Erin Beadle 7	Pts: Bria Richardson 11; Rebs: Kelse' Brockway 10; Asts: Bria Richardson 3

Firestone Fieldhouse
Malibu, CA
Attendance: 337
Referees: Brenda Pantoja, Cathi Cornell, Richard Waters

=== Seattle ===
Series History: Pepperdine leads 1-0

Nov 8
7:05 pm PST

Recap

Pepperdine Waves 72, Seattle Redhawks 60
Scoring by half: 34-39, 26-33
Pts: Bria Richardson 16; Rebs: Tessa Emerson 11; Asts: Bria Richardson 4	Pts: Kacie Sowell 16; Rebs: Kacie Sowell 10; Asts: Sylvia Shephard 5

Connolly Center
Seattle, WA
Attendance: 506
Referees: Julie Krommenhoek, Kim Mains, Julie Vanni

=== UCLA ===
Series History: UCLA leads series 15-3

Nov 11
7:00 pm PST

Recap

Pepperdine Waves 78, UCLA Bruins 82
Scoring by half: 33-38, 45-44
Pts: Bria Richardson 25; Rebs: Ea Shoushtari 5 Asts: Bria Rochardson 5	Pts: Thea Lemberger 25; Rebs: Nirra Fields 10; Asts: Atonye Nyingifa 5

Pauley Pavilion
Los Angeles, CA
Attendance: 1,301
Referees: Melissa Barlow, Eric Larson, Janetta Graham

=== UC Irvine ===
Series History: Pepperdine leads 20-11
Broadcaster: Josh Perigo

TV-32

Nov 14
7:05 pm PST

Recap

UC Irvine Anteaters 59, Pepperdine Waves 76
Scoring by half: 23-35, 36-41
Pts: Jennifer Tsurumoto 14; Rebs: Jazmyne White 8 Asts: Jazmyne White & Camille Buckley 3	Pts: Ea Shoushtari 21; Rebs: Ea Shoushtari 13; Asts: Ea Shoushtari 6

Firestone Fieldhouse
Malibu, CA
Attendance: 205
Referees: Robert Scofield, Michol Murray, In'Fini Robinson

=== South Dakota State ===
Series History: First Meeting

Nov 21
7:00 pm PST

Recap

Pepperdine Waves 55, South Dakota State Jackrabbits 88
Scoring by half: 17-41, 38-47
Pts: Bria Richardson 15; Rebs: Tessa Emerson & Keitra Wallace 5 Asts: Ea Shoushtari 2	Pts: Megan Waytashek 26; Rebs: Hannah Strop, Megan Waytashek, & Clarissa Ober 6 Asts: Kerri Young 3

Frost Arena
Brookings, SD
Attendance: 1,409
Referees: Bob Enterline, Ben Franson, Mary Toberman

=== Wyoming ===
Series History: Wyoming leads 5-3

MW Net

Nov 23
6:00 pm MST

Recap

Pepperdine Waves 64, Wyoming Cowgirls 84
Scoring by half: 31-45, 33-39
Pts: Bria Richardson 18; Rebs: Amanda Lovely 6 Asts: Bria Richardson 7	Pts: Kayla Woodward & Fallon Lewis 24; Rebs: Fallon Lewis 7 Asts: Chelan Landry 6

Arena-Auditorium
Laramie, WY
Attendance: 3,518
Referees: Eric Larson, Tiffany Bird, Eric Solis

=== Oregon ===
Series History: Oregon leads 2-1

Nov 25
7:00 pm PST

Recap

Pepperdine Waves 80, Oregon Ducks 83
Scoring by half: 32-48, 48-35
Pts: Bria Richardson 19; Rebs: Ea Shoushtari 11; Asts: Bria Richardson 8	Pts: Jillian Alleyne 21; Rebs: Jillian Alleyne 17; Asts: Ariel Thomas 7

Matthew Knight Arena
Eugene, OR
Attendance: 969
Referees: Brenda Pantoja, Charles Gonzales, Paul Patterson

=== Long Beach State ===
Series History: Long Beach State leads 10-3

BigWest.tv

Nov 30
2:00 pm PST

Recap

Pepperdine Waves 61, Long Beach State 49ers 74
Scoring by half: 23-37, 38-37
Pts: Allie Green 27; Rebs: Ea Shoushtrai 9 Asts: Bria Richardson 8	Pts: Lauren Spargo 19; Rebs: Madison Montgomery 10; Asts: Hallie Meneses 7

Walter Pyramid
Long Beach, CA
Attendance: 668
Referees: Gary Horky, Clifford Sims Sr., Rick Rodman

=== UC Santa Barbara ===
Series History: Pepperdine leads 16-13
Broadcaster: Josh Perigo

TV-32

Dec 3
7:05 pm PST

Recap

UC Santa Barbara Gauchos 77, Pepperdine Waves 69
Scoring by half: 31-37, 46-32
Pts: Nicole Nesbit 26; Rebs: Melissa Zornig 9 Asts: Nicole Nesbit & Melissa Zornig 4	Pts: Grace Leah Baughn 17; Rebs: Erica Chandler 14; Asts: Grace Leah Baughn & Kelsey Brockway 4

Firestone Fieldhouse
Malibu, CA
Attendance: 278
Referees: Michol Murray, Penny Davis, Felicity Willis

=== UC Riverside ===
Series History: Pepperdine leads 11-3

BigWest.tv

Dec 6
7:00 pm PST

Recap

Pepperdine Waves 81, UC Riverside Highlanders 68
Scoring by half: 38-31, 43-37
Pts: Bria Richardson 31; Rebs: Keitra Wallace 6 Asts: Bria Richardson 4	Pts: Brittany Crain 21; Rebs: Natasha Hadley 11; Asts: Natasha Hadley 4

UC Riverside Student Recreation Center
Riverside, CA
Attendance: 203
Referees: Victor Dunomes, Crystal Hogan, Daniel Coda

=== Cal Poly ===
Series History: Pepperdine leads 12-4
Broadcaster: Josh Perigo

TV-32

Dec 16
7:05 pm PST

Recap

Cal Poly Mustangs 80, Pepperdine Waves 77
Scoring by half: 36-36, 44-41
Pts: Ariana Elegado 17; Rebs: Maddison Allen 11; Asts: Ariana Elegado 10	Pts: Keitra Wallace 24; Rebs: Bria Richardson & Ea Shousthtari 6 Asts: Bria Richardson, Keitra Wallace, & Amanda lovely 3

Firestone Fieldhouse
Malibu, CA
Attendance: 205
Referees: Charles Gonzales, Robert Scofield, Benny Luna

=== Northern Arizona ===
Series History: Pepperdine leads 5-3
Broadcaster: Josh Perigo

TV-32

Dec 21
3:35 pm PST

Recap

Northern Arizona Lumberjacks 51, Pepperdine Waves 74
Scoring by half: 30-29, 21-45
Pts: Amanda Frost 25; Rebs: Brittani Lusain 8 Asts: Brittani Lusain 8	Pts: Bria Richardson 18; Rebs: Ea Shousthtari 8 Asts: Ea Shousthtari 8

Firestone Fieldhouse
Malibu, CA
Attendance: 810
Referees: Rick Showers, Cheryl Flores, Julie Vianni

=== San Diego ===
Series History: Pepperdine leads 39-27
Broadcaster: Paula Hood

USD TV

Dec 28
2:05 pm PST

Recap

Pepperdine Waves 43, San Diego Toreros 71
Scoring by half: 20-33, 23-38
Pts: Keitra Wallace 19; Rebs: Allie Green 8 Asts: Jaya Schultz, Keitra Wallace, & Amanda Lovely 1	Pts: Felicia Wijenberg 24; Rebs: Felicia Wijenberg 11; Asts: Malina Hood 3

Jenny Craig Pavilion
San Diego, CA
Attendance: 513
Referees: Melissa Barlow, Gordon Torigoe, L. Renee Robinson

=== BYU ===
Series History: BYU leads 5-2
Broadcasters: Spencer Linton, Kristen Kozlowski, and Andy Boyce

BYUtv

Dec 30
5:05 pm MST

Recap

Pepperdine Waves 50, BYU Cougars 65
Scoring by half: 30-31, 20-34
Pts: Allie Green 19; Rebs: Ea Shoushtari 8 Asts: Keita Wallace 6	Pts: Lexi Eaton 18; Rebs: Jannifer Hamson 13; Asts: Kylie Maeda 5

Marriott Center
Provo, UT
Attendance: 639
Referees: Karen Lasuik, Alex Carroll, Bethany Graves

=== Santa Clara ===
Series History: Pepperdine leads 33-32
Broadcaster: Josh Perigo

TV-32

Jan 2
7:05 pm PST

Recap

Santa Clara Broncos 93, Pepperdine Waves 100 (OT)
Scoring by half: 37-33, 39-43 Overtime: 9-9, 8-15
Pts: Jo Paine & Ruta Zurauskyte 28; Rebs: Ruta Zurauskyte 18; Asts: Katie Hawkins 6	Pts: Bria Richardson 44; Rebs: Ea Shoushtari & Keitra Wallace 9 Asts: Keita Wallace 7

Firestone Fieldhouse
Malibu, CA
Attendance: 346
Referees: Penny Davis, Darren Krzesnik, Cheryll Blue

=== San Francisco ===
Series History: Pepperdine leads 34-33
Broadcaster: Josh Perigo

TV-32

Jan 4
2:05 pm PST

Recap

San Francisco Dons 77, Pepperdine Waves 61
Scoring by half: 42-33, 30-48
Pts: Taylor Proctor 22; Rebs: Taj Winston 10; Asts: Zhane Dikes 5	Pts: Allie Green 13; Rebs: Amanda Lovely 10; Asts: Bria Richardson 6

Firestone Fieldhouse
Malibu, CA
Attendance: 156
Referees: Michelle Russi, Benito Luna, Alecia Murray

=== Loyola Marymount ===
Series History: Pepperdine leads 50-18
Broadcaster: Josh Perigo

TV-32

Jan 11
2:00 pm PST

Recap

Loyola Marymount Lions 76, Pepperdine Waves 64
Scoring by half: 37-34, 39-30
Pts: Sophie Taylor 27; Rebs: Emily Ben-Jumbo & Sophie Taylor 8 Asts: Hazel Ramirez 10	Pts: Bria Richardson 21; Rebs: Ea Shoushtari 10; Asts: Bria Richardson & Keitra Wallce 3

Firestone Fieldhouse
Malibu, CA
Attendance: 401
Referees: Karen Lasuik, Crystal Hogan, Richard Waters

=== Saint Mary's ===
Series History: Saint Mary's leads 31-29

Jan 16
6:05 pm PST

Recap

Pepperdine Waves 48, Saint Mary's Gaels 71
Scoring by half: 16-42, 32-29
Pts: Alisha Roberts 15; Rebs: Ea Shoushtari & Amanda Lovely 7 Asts: Amanda Lovely 2	Pts: Jackie Nared 27; Rebs: Danielle Mauldin 13; Asts: Kate Gaze 5

McKeon Pavilion
Moraga, CA
Attendance: 245
Referees: Anita Ortega, Kenneth Nash, Julie Vanni

=== Pacific ===
Series History: Pepperdine leads 3-0
Broadcasters: Don Gubbins and Alex Sanchez

TheW.tv

Jan 18
2:05 pm PST

Recap

Pepperdine Waves 64, Pacific Tigers 75
Scoring by half: 28-25, 36-50
Pts: Ea Shoushtari 18; Rebs: Ea Shoushtari 9 Asts: Grace Leah Barnes 4	Pts: Kendall Kenyon 21; Rebs: Erin Butler 12; Asts: Kiki Moore 6

Alex G. Spanos Center
Stockton, CA
Attendance: 705
Referees: Penny Davis, Bethany Graves, Brian Woods

=== Portland ===
Series History: Pepperdine leads series 34-22
Broadcaster: Josh Perigo

TV-32

Jan 23
7:05 pm PST

Recap

Portland Pilots 53, Pepperdine Waves 43
Scoring by half: 22-22, 31-21
Pts: Cassandra Thompson 15; Rebs: Amy Pupa 11; Asts: Jasmine Wooton & Amy Pupa 5	Pts: Tessa Emerson 14; Rebs: Grace Lee Baughn & Ea Shoushtari 8 Asts: Ea Shoushtari 4

Firestone Fieldhouse
Malibu, CA
Attendance: 237
Referees: Lisa Jones, Robert Scofield, Bart Baldwin

=== Gonzaga ===
Series History: Gonzaga leads 30-29
Broadcaster: Josh Perigo

TV-32

Jan 25
2:00pm PST

Recap

Gonzaga Bulldogs 69, Pepperdine Waves 39
Scoring by half: 31-23, 38-16
Pts: Sunny Greinacher 13; Rebs: Kiara Kudron 6 Asts: Danielle Walter 7	Pts: Keitra Wallace & Grace Leah Baughn 8 Rebs: Ea Shoushtari 8 Asts: Keitra Wallace 4

Firestone Fieldhouse
Malibu, CA
Attendance: 409
Referees: Charles Gonzales, Tiffany Jump, In'Fini Robinson

=== Loyola Marymount ===
Series History: Pepperdine leads 50-19

Feb 1
2:00 pm PST

Recap

Pepperdine Waves 74, Loyola Marymount Lions 90
Scoring by half: 32-45, 42-45
Pts: Allie Green 14; Rebs: Ea Shoushtari 5 Asts: Ea Shoushtari 11	Pts: Leslie Lopez-Wood 18; Rebs: Emily Ben-Jumbo 10; Asts: Hazel Ramirez 11

Gersten Pavilion
Los Angeles, CA
Attendance: 302
Referees: Kyle Bacon, Alejandro Moreno, Lucy Banuelos

=== Gonzaga ===
Series History: Gonzaga leads 31-29

Feb 6
6:00pm PST

Recap

Pepperdine Waves 51, Gonzaga Bulldogs 86
Scoring by half: 24-45, 27-41
Pts: Keitra Wallace & Amanda Lovely 13; Rebs: Keitra Wallace 5 Asts: Ea Shoushtari 4	Pts: Lindsay Sherbert 19; Rebs: Shelby Cheslek 12; Asts: Haiden Palmer 8

McCarthey Athletic Center
Spokane, WA
Attendance: 4,951
Referees: Brenda Pantoja, Crystal Hogan, Janetta Graham

=== Portland ===
Series History: Pepperdine leads series 34-23

Feb 8
2:00 pm PST

Recap

Pepperdine Waves 59, Portland Pilots 78
Scoring by half: 19-43, 40-35
Pts: Allie Green 19; Rebs: Ea Shoushtari & Allie Green 8 Asts: Allie Green 2	Pts: Cassandra Thompson & Jasmine Wooton 17; Rebs: Cassandra Brown & Amy Pupa 8 Asts: Jasmine Wooton 8

Chiles Center
Portland, OR
Attendance: 242
Referees: Darren Krzesnik, Bethany Graves, Teresa Turner

=== Pacific ===
Series History: Pepperdine leads 3-1
Broadcasters: Josh Perigo

TV-32

Feb 13
7:00 pm PST

Recap

Pacific Tigers 91, Pepperdine Waves 67
Scoring by half: 46-28, 45-29
Pts: Hailie Eackles 16; Rebs: Kendall Kenyon 8 Asts: Kristina Johnson 4	Pts: Keitra Wallace 20; Rebs: Ea Shoushtari 9 Asts: Ea Shoushtari 5

Firestone Fieldhouse
Malbu, CA
Attendance: 203
Referees: Melissa Barlow, Michelle Russi, Kenneth Nash

=== Saint Mary's ===
Series History: Saint Mary's leads 32-29
Broadcaster: Josh Perigo

TV-32

Feb 15
2:00 pm PST

Recap

Saint Mary's Gaels 74, Pepperdine Waves 61
Scoring by half: 33-31, 41-30
Pts: Danielle Mauldin 22; Rebs: Danielle Mauldin 8 Asts: Kate Gaze 6	Pts: Amanda Lovely 14; Rebs: Amanda Lovely 8 Asts: Allie Green 5

Firestone Fieldhouse
Malibu, CA
Attendance: 331
Referees: Brian Woods, Shelley Nakasone, Alex Carroll

=== BYU ===
Series History: BYU leads 6-2
Broadcaster: Josh Perigo

TV-32

Feb 20
7:05 pm PST

Recap

BYU Cougars 89, Pepperdine Waves 75
Scoring by half: 53-33, 36-42
Pts: Lexi Eaton 25; Rebs: Jennifer Hamson 14; Asts: Kylie Maeda 7	Pts: Ea Shoushtari 23; Rebs: Ea Shoushtari 5 Asts: Ea Shoushtari 8

Firestone Fieldhouse
Malibu, CA
Attendance: 115
Referees: Rick Showers, Benito Luna, Michelle McCoy

=== San Diego ===
Series History: Pepperdine leads 39-28
Broadcaster: Josh Perigo

TV-32

Feb 22
2:05 pm PST

Recap

San Diego Toreros 73, Pepperdine Waves 46
Scoring by half: 40-26, 33-20
Pts: Malina Hood 23; Rebs: Kameron Knutson 9 Asts: Amy Kame 6	Pts: Keitra Wallace 14; Rebs: Ea Shoushtari & Keitra Wallace 5 Asts: Ea Shoushtari 3

Firestone Fieldhouse
Malibu, CA
Attendance: 223
Referees: Robert Scofield, Paul Patterson, Lisa Ulmer

=== San Francisco ===
Series History: Series even 34-34

Feb 27
7:00 pm PST

Recap

Pepperdine Waves 61, San Francisco Dons 75
Scoring by half: 32-34, 29-41
Pts: Ea Shoushtari 13; Rebs: Keitra Wallace 8 Asts: Keitra Wallace 3	Pts: Zhane Dikes 15; Rebs: Taylor Proctor 11; Asts: Zhane Dikes, Rachel Howard, & Aundrea Gordon 2

War Memorial Gymnasium
San Francisco, CA
Attendance: 413
Referees: Anita Ortega, Bethany Graves, Brian Woods

== Rankings ==
+ Regular season polls	Poll	Pre- Season	Week 1	Week 2	Week 3	Week 4	Week 5	Week 6	Week 7	Week 8	Week 9	Week 10	Week 11	Week 12	Week 13	Week 14	Week 15	Week 16	Week 17	Week 18	Final
AP																					
Coaches																					

Legend
	Increase in ranking
	Decrease in ranking
	No change
(RV)	Received votes
