= 2013–14 Santa Clara Broncos women's basketball team =

Intercollegiate basketball season

2013–14 Santa Clara Broncos women's basketball
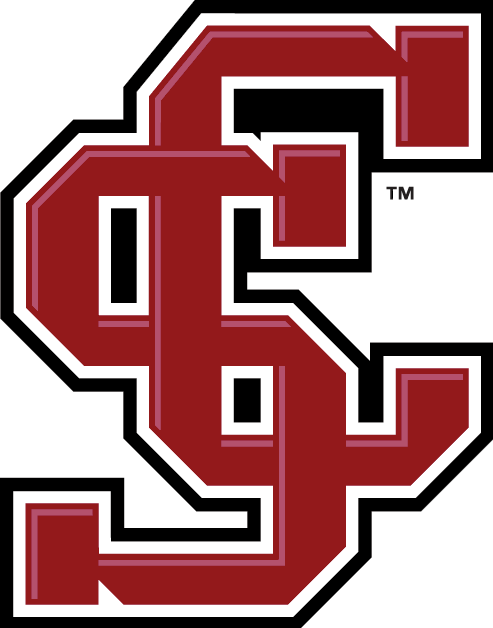
- Conference: West Coast Conference
- Record: 10–20 (6–12 WCC)
- Head coach: Jennifer Mountain (6th season)
- Assistant coaches: Stacy Clinesmith; Rich Brown; Amanda Brown
- Home arena: Leavey Center

2013–14 West Coast Conference women's basketball standings
	Conf.				Overall
Team	W		L	PCT	W		L	PCT
No. 18 Gonzaga†	16	–	2	.889	29	–	5	.853
BYU	14	–	4	.778	28	–	7	.800
Pacific	12	–	6	.667	18	–	13	.581
Saint Mary's	11	–	7	.611	23	–	10	.697
San Diego	11	–	7	.611	24	–	9	.727
Portland	7	–	11	.389	14	–	16	.467
Santa Clara	6	–	12	.333	10	–	20	.333
San Francisco	6	–	12	.333	12	–	19	.387
Loyola Marymount	6	–	12	.333	9	–	21	.300
Pepperdine	1	–	17	.056	6	–	25	.194
† 2014 WCC tournament winner As of March 29, 2014; Rankings from AP Poll

The 2013–14 Santa Clara Broncos women's basketball team represented Santa Clara University in the 2013–14 college basketball season. It was head coach Jennifer Mountain's sixth season at Santa Clara. The Broncos were members of the West Coast Conference and played their home games at the Leavey Center. After finishing the season 10–21, the Broncos chose not to renew Mountains contract.

== Before the season ==
The conference pre-season poll should be released at WCC Media Days in mid-October.

== Roster ==
2013–14 Santa Clara Broncos women's basketball team
Players
Coaches

Pos.	#	Name	Height	Year	Previous school	Hometown
G	0	Montana Waltyers	5 ft 5 in (1.65 m)	Fr	Oregon City	Oregon City, OR
G	4	Ricki Radanovich	5 ft 10 in (1.78 m)	Sr	Carondelet	Diablo, CA
F	5	Beth Carlson	6 ft 2 in (1.88 m)	Fr	Archbishop Murphy	Everett, WA
G/F	10	Katie Hawkins	5 ft 11 in (1.8 m)	So	Glacier Park	Snohomish, WA
G	12	Nici Gilday	5 ft 7 in (1.7 m)	Jr	Presentation	San Jose, CA
F	15	Marie Bertholdt	6 ft 1 in (1.85 m)	Fr	Alameda	Alameda, CA
F	20	Courtney Lisowski	6 ft 0 in (1.83 m)	RS Fr	Archbishop Mitty	Los Gatos, CA
G	21	Raquel Avila	5 ft 5 in (1.65 m)	Jr	St. Ignatius College Prep	S. San Francisco, CA
G	22	Brooke Gallaway	5 ft 11 in (1.8 m)	So	Central Valley	Greenacres, WA
F	23	Taylor Williams	6 ft 0 in (1.83 m)	Fr	ThunderRidge	Highlands Ranch, CO
F	24	Arteivia Lilomaiava	6 ft 0 in (1.83 m)	Sr	Aragon	San Mateo, CA
G	30	Shelby Swofford	5 ft 10 in (1.78 m)	Sr	Bellarmine Prep	Gig Harbor, WA
F	32	Jo Paine	6 ft 0 in (1.83 m)	Fr	Oregon City	Oregon City, OR
C	33	Ruta Zurauskyte	6 ft 4 in (1.93 m)	RS Sr	Regis Jesuit	Šiauliai, Lithuania
G	34	Iman Scott	5 ft 9 in (1.75 m)	RS Jr	Archbishop Mitty	San Jose, CA
F/C	45	Vanessa Leo	6 ft 4 in (1.93 m)	RS So	Archbishop Mitty	San Jose, CA

Head coach

- Jennifer Mountain (Gonzaga)

Assistant coach(es)

- Stacy Clinesmith (UC Santa Barbara)
- Rich Brown (Santa Clara)
- Amanda Brown (Gonzaga)

Legend

- (C) Team captain
- (S) Suspended
- (I) Ineligible
- (W) Walk-on
- Injured
- Current redshirt

Roster

== Schedule and results ==
Date time, TV	Rank^{#}	Opponent^{#}	Result	Record	Site city, state
Exhibition
11/01/2013*; 7:00 pm, Santa Clara TV		Sonoma State	W 81–47	-	Leavey Center; Santa Clara, CA
11/03/2013*; 2:00 pm, Santa Clara TV		Humboldt State	W 94–68	-	Leavey Center; Santa Clara, CA
Regular Season
11/07/2013*; 7:00 pm, MW Net		at UNLV	L 70–77	0–1	Cox Pavilion; Paradise, NV
11/12/2013*; 5:30 pm, Santa Clara TV		San Jose State	L 93–97	0–2	Leavey Center; Santa Clara, CA
11/17/2013*; 2:00 pm, Santa Clara TV		UC Riverside	L 80–90 ^{OT}	0–3	Leavey Center; Santa Clara, CA
11/20/2013*; 7:00 pm, Santa Clara TV		San Francisco State	W 67–57	1–3	Leavey Center; Santa Clara, CA
11/23/2013*; 5:30 pm, Santa Clara TV		UC Santa Barbara	L 62–67	1–4	Leavey Center; Santa Clara, CA
11/29/2013*; 7:30 pm, BigWest.tv		at Cal State Northridge; Radisson Hotel Chatsworth Thanksgiving Basketball Classic	W 66–61	2–4	Matadome; Northridge, CA
11/30/2013*; 7:30 pm, BigWest.tv		vs. Hampton; Radisson Hotel Chatsworth Thanksgiving Basketball Classic Championship	L 48–70	2–5	Matadome; Northridge, CA
12/08/2013*; 2:00 pm, MW Net		at Fresno State	L 49–69	2–6	Save Mart Center; Fresno, CA
12/14/2013*; 5:00 pm, UVU Digital		at Utah Valley	W 64–61	3–6	PE Building; Orem, UT
12/18/2013*; 5:30 pm, Santa Clara TV		UC Davis	L 70–75	3–7	Leavey Center; Santa Clara, CA
12/20/2013*; 7:00 pm, Santa Clara TV		Georgia State	W 87–68	4–7	Leavey Center; Santa Clara, CA
12/30/2013; 7:00 pm, Santa Clara TV		San Francisco	W 81–72	5–7 (1–0)	Leavey Center; Santa Clara, CA
01/02/2014; 7:00 pm, TV-32		at Pepperdine	L 93–100 ^{2OT}	5–8 (1–1)	Firestone Fieldhouse; Malibu, CA
01/04/2014; 2:00 pm, LMUSN		at Loyola Marymount	W 69–65	6–8 (2–1)	Gersten Pavilion; Los Angeles, CA
01/09/2014; 7:00 pm, Santa Clara TV		Saint Mary's	L 70–80	6–9 (2–2)	Leavey Center; Santa Clara, CA
01/11/2014; 2:00 pm, Santa Clara TV		Pacific	L 68–88	6–10 (2–3)	Leavey Center; Santa Clara, CA
01/17/2014; 7:00 pm, Santa Clara TV		Portland	W 69–62	7–10 (3–3)	Leavey Center; Santa Clara, CA
01/19/2014; 2:00 pm, TheW.tv		Gonzaga	L 61–67	7–11 (3–4)	Leavey Center; Santa Clara, CA
01/23/2014; 7:00 pm, USD TV		at San Diego	L 55–79	7–12 (3–5)	Jenny Craig Pavilion; San Diego, CA
01/25/2014; 2:00 pm, BYUtv		at BYU	L 44–61	7–13 (3–6)	Marriott Center; Provo, UT
01/30/2014; 6:00 pm, Zags Sports Channel		at Gonzaga	L 37–89	7–14 (3–7)	McCarthey Athletic Center; Spokane, WA
02/01/2014; 1:00 pm, Pilots TV		at Portland	L 55–75	7–15 (3–8)	Chiles Center; Portland, OR
02/06/2014; 7:00 pm, Santa Clara TV		BYU	L 80–87 ^{OT}	7–16 (3–9)	Leavey Center; Santa Clara, CA
02/08/2014; 2:00 pm, Santa Clara TV		San Diego	L 44–72	7–17 (3–10)	Leavey Center; Santa Clara, CA
02/15/2014; 2:00 pm, USF TV		at San Francisco	W 74–73	8–17 (4–10)	War Memorial Gymnasium; San Francisco, CA
02/20/2014; 7:00 pm, TheW.tv		at Pacific	L 47–64	8–18 (4–11)	Alex G. Spanos Center; Stockton, CA
02/22/2014; 2:00 pm, Gaels Insider		at Saint Mary's	W 89–83	9–18 (5–11)	McKeon Pavilion; Moraga, CA
02/27/2014; 7:00 pm, Santa Clara TV		Loyola Marymount	L 74–88	9–19 (5–12)	Leavey Center; Santa Clara, CA
03/01/2014; 2:00 pm, Santa Clara TV		Pepperdine	W 67–61	10–19 (6–12)	Leavey Center; Santa Clara, CA
2014 West Coast Conference women's basketball tournament
03/06/2014; 12:00 pm, BYUtv		vs. Pepperdine; 1st Round	L 74–80	10–20	Orleans Arena; Las Vegas, NV
*Non-conference game. ^{#}Rankings from AP Poll. (#) Tournament seedings in parentheses. All times are in Pacific Time.

== Game summaries ==
=== Exhibition: Sonoma State ===
Nov 1
7:00 pm PDT

Recap

Sonoma State Seawolves 47, Santa Clara Broncos 81
Scoring by half: 17-52, 30-29
Pts: Tanner Adams 13; Rebs: Natalie Del Carlo 7 Asts: Tanner Adams & Kristina Fahey 2	Pts: Vanessa Leo 14; Rebs: Jo Paine & Vanessa Leo 12; Asts: Montana Walters 5

Leavey Center
Santa Clara, CA
Attendance: 385
Referees: Charles Gonzales, Robert Scofield, Bart Baldwin

=== Exhibition: Humboldt State ===
Nov 3
2:00 pm PST

Recap

Humboldt State Lumberjacks 68, Santa Clara Broncos 94
Scoring by half: 37-46, 31-48
Pts: Sumayyah Wiggins 20; Rebs: Kelly Kime 5 Asts: Jae Shin 3	Pts: Jo Paine 13; Rebs: Vanessa Leo 9 Asts: Jo Paine 5

Leavey Center
Santa Clara, CA
Attendance: 370
Referees: Rick Showers, Michol Murray, Richard Waters

=== UNLV ===
Series History: Santa Clara leads series 1-0

MW Network

Nov 7
4:30 pm PST

Recap

Santa Clara Broncos 70, UNLV Lady Rebels 77
Scoring by half: 36-29, 34-48
Pts: Nici Gilday 22; Rebs: Ricki Radanovich & Nici Gilday 8 Asts: Ricki Radanovich 6	Pts: Alana Cesarz & Danielle Miller 16; Rebs: Rejane Verin & Aley Rhode 9 Asts: Mia Bell 8

Thomas & Mack Center
Paradise, NV
Attendance: 603
Referees: Jack Jones, Lisa Jones, Kent Johnson

=== San Jose State ===
Series History: Santa Clara leads series 24-20

Nov 12
5:30 pm PST

Recap

San Jose State Spartans 97, Santa Clara Broncos 93
Scoring by half: 46-51, 51-42
Pts: Ta'Rea Cunnigan 23; Rebs: Riana Byrd 14; Asts: Ta'Rea Cunnigan 4	Pts: Nici Gilday 25; Rebs: Vanessa Leo 7 Asts: Montana Walters 8

Leavey Center
Santa Clara, CA
Attendance: N/A
Referees: Robert Scofield, Penny Davis, Julie Vianni

=== UC Riverside ===
Series History: Santa Clara leads series 1-0

Nov 17
2:00 pm PST

Recap

UC Riverside Highlanders 80, Santa Clara Broncos 70 (OT)
Scoring by half: 34-42, 40-32 Overtime: 16-6
Pts: Brittany Crain 37; Rebs: Natasha Hadley 8 Asts: Kiara Harewood & Annelise Ito 4	Pts: Marie Bertholdt 18; Rebs: Vanessa Leo 14; Asts: Brooke Gallaway 6

Leavey Center
Santa Clara, CA
Attendance: 240
Referees: Cathi Cornell, Lucy Banuelos, Cheryll Blue

=== San Francisco State ===
Series History: Santa Clara leads series 8-7

Nov 20
7:00 pm PST

Recap

San Francisco State Gatora 57, Santa Clara Broncos 67
Scoring by half: 29-39, 28-28
Pts: Angela Van Sickel 15; Rebs: Lauren Varney 13; Asts: Jennifer Lea & Katie Batlin 3	Pts: Jo Paine 13; Rebs: Vanessa Leo 11; Asts: Nici Gilday 6

Leavey Center
Santa Clara, CA
Attendance: 179
Referees: Michol Murray, Kenneth Nash, Gordon Toriogue

=== UC Santa Barbara ===
Series History: UC Santa Barbara leads series 4-2

Nov 23
5:35 pm PST

Recap

UC Santa Barbara Gauchos 67, Santa Clara Broncos 62
Scoring by half: 33-34, 34-28
Pts: Nicole Nesbit 19; Rebs: Destini Mason 10; Asts: Nicole Nesbit 3	Pts: Jo Paine 14; Rebs: Jo Paine 9 Asts: Nici Gilday & Ruta Zurauskyte 3

Leavey Center
Santa Clara, CA
Attendance: 457
Referees: Wanda Szeremeta, Crystal Hogan, Janetta Graham

=== Cal State Northridge ===
Series History: Santa Clara leads series 7-2

Nov 29
7:30 pm PST

Recap

Santa Clara Broncos 66, Cal State Northridge Matadors 61
Scoring by half: 30-33, 36-28
Pts: Ruta Zurauskyte 13; Rebs: Marie Bertholdt 6 Asts: Nici Gilday, Katie Hawkins, & Artelvla Lilomaiava 3	Pts: Ashlee Guay 17; Rebs: Mikayla Thelges 7 Asts: Ashlee Guay 6

Matadome
Northridge, CA
Attendance: 359
Referees: Andy Wolf, Betty Cardenas, Brandon Self

=== Hampton ===
Series History: First Meeting

Nov 30
7:30 pm PST

Recap

Hampton Pirates 70, Santa Clara Broncos 48
Scoring by half: 37-25, 33-23
Pts: Alyssa Bennett 31; Rebs: Brielle Ward 8 Asts: Nicole Hamilton 11	Pts: Marie Bertholdt 10; Rebs: Nici Gilday 7 Asts: Montana Walters & Nici Gilday 3

Matadome
Northridge, CA
Attendance: 259
Referees: Alecia Murray, Danielle Hernandez, Adria Molina

=== Fresno State ===
Series History: Fresno State leads 22-15

MW Net

Dec 8
2:00 pm PST

Recap

Santa Clara Broncos 49, Fresno State Bulldogs 69
Scoring by half: 17-36, 32-33
Pts: Nici Gilday 13; Rebs: Vanessa Leo 8 Asts: Katie Hawkins 3	Pts: Moriah Faulk 15; Rebs: Moriah Faulk 13; Asts: Taylor Thompson 5

Save Mart Center
Fresno, CA
Attendance: 2,267
Referees: Melissa Barlow, Lisa Jones, Benny Luna

=== Utah Valley ===
Series History: Santa Clara leads 1-0

Dec 14
3:00 pm MST

Recap

Santa Clara Broncos 70, Utah Valley Wolverines 67
Scoring by half: 29-27, 35-34
Pts: Ruta Zurauskyte 14; Rebs: Ruta Zurauskyte 8 Asts: Raquel Avila 5	Pts: Katie Kuklok 17; Rebs: Karlee Kartchner 10; Asts: Kyra Prause 7

PE Building
Orem, UT
Attendance: 156
Referees: Jack Jones, Rick Thorne, Brad Schmidt

=== UC Davis ===
Series History: UC Davis leads 12-10

Dec 18
5:30 pm PST

Recap

UC Davis Aggies 75, Santa Clara Broncos 70
Scoring by half: 34-32, 41-38
Pts: Sydnee Fipps 22; Rebs: Brianna Salvatore 9 Asts: Sydnee Fipps & Molly Greubel 4	Pts: Nici Gilday 19; Rebs: Jo Paine & Vanessa Leo 7 Asts: Nici Gilday & Jo Paine 4

Leavey Center
Santa Clara, CA
Attendance: 992
Referees: Penny Davis, Wanda Szeremeta, Janetta Graham

=== Georgia State ===
Series History: First Meeting

Dec 20
3:00 pm PST

Recap

Georgia State Panthers 68, Santa Clara Broncos 87
Scoring by half: 34-48, 34-39
Pts: Haley Gerrin 15; Rebs: Brittany Logan & Haley Gerrin 6 Asts: Alisha Andrews & Kendra Long 4	Pts: Ruta Zurauskyte 24; Rebs: Marie Bertholdt 8 Asts: Jo Paine 5

Leavey Center
Santa Clara, CA
Attendance: 394
Referees: Marianne Karp, Alecia Murray, In'Fini Robinson

=== San Francisco ===
Series History: Santa Clara leads 52-35

Dec 30
7:00 pm PST

Recap

San Francisco Dons 72, Santa Clara Broncos 81
Scoring by half: 42-33, 30-48
Pts: Taj Winston 14; Rebs: Taj Winston & Taylor Proctor 6 Asts: Taylor Proctor 4	Pts: Ruta Zurauskyte 21; Rebs: Ruta Zurauskyte 8 Asts: Raquel Avila 5

Leavey Center
Santa Clara, CA
Attendance: N/A
Referees: Cathi Cornell, Crystal Hogan, Teresa Turner

=== Pepperdine ===
Series History: Pepperdine leads 33-32
Broadcaster: Josh Perigo

TV-32

Jan 2
7:05 pm PST

Recap

Santa Clara Broncos 93, Pepperdine Waves 100 (OT)
Scoring by half: 37-33, 39-43 Overtime: 9-9, 8-15
Pts: Jo Paine & Ruta Zurauskyte 28; Rebs: Ruta Zurauskyte 18; Asts: Katie Hawkins 6	Pts: Bria Richardson 44; Rebs: Ea Shoushtari & Keitra Wallace 9 Asts: Keita Wallace 7

Firestone Fieldhouse
Malibu, CA
Attendance: 346
Referees: Penny Davis, Darren Krzesnik, Cheryll Blue

=== Loyola Marymount ===
Series History: Santa Clara leads 43-20

LMUSN

Jan 4
2:00 pm PST

Recap

Santa Clara Broncos 69, Loyola Marymount Lions 65
Scoring by half: 31-24, 38-41
Pts: Nici Gilday 34; Rebs: Marie Bertholdt 10; Asts: Raquel Avila 5	Pts: Deanna Johnson 19; Rebs: MacKenzie Kerins 12; Asts: Deanna Johnson 6

Gersten Pavilion
Los Angeles, CA
Attendance: 489
Referees: Lucy Banuelos, Steve Belnap, Brenda Pantoja

=== Saint Mary's ===
Series History: Santa Clara leads 33-31

Jan 9
7:00 pm PST

Recap

Saint Mary's Gaels 80, Santa Clara Broncos 70
Scoring by half: 37-37, 43-33
Pts: Danielle Mauldin 24; Rebs: Danielle Mauldin 17; Asts: Kate Gaze 3	Pts: Jo Paine 19; Rebs: Marie Bertholdt 5 Asts: Nici Gilday & Raquel Avila 4

Leavey Center
Santa Clara, CA
Attendance: N/A
Referees: Karen Lasuik, Rick Showers, Brian Woods

=== Pacific ===
Series History: Santa Clara leads 25-16

Jan 11
2:00 pm PST

Recap

Pacific Tigers 88, Santa Clara Broncos 68
Scoring by half: 44-36, 44-32
Pts: Kendall Kenyon 25; Rebs: Kendall Kenyon & Marjorie Heard 10; Asts: Madison Parrish & Kiki Moore 5	Pts: Ruta Zurauskyte 16; Rebs: Jo Paine & Ruta Zurauskyta 7 Asts: Raquel Avila 7

Leavey Center
Santa Clara, CA
Attendance: 403
Referees: Wanda Szeremeta, Alex Carrol, In'Fini Robinson

=== Portland ===
Series History: Santa Clara leads 34-29

Jan 17
7:00 pm PST

Recap

Portland Pilots 62, Santa Clara Broncos 69
Scoring by half: 13-40, 49-29
Pts: Amy Pupa 16; Rebs: Amy Pupa 10; Asts: Kari Luttinen 4	Pts: Nici Gilday 19; Rebs: Jo Paine 7 Asts: Raquel Avila 7

Leavey Center
Santa Clara, CA
Attendance: 243
Referees: Anita Ortega, Janetta Graham, Rigo Vasquez

=== Gonzaga ===
Series History: Gonzaga leads 29-27
Broadcaster: George Devine and Mary-Hile Nepfel

TheW.tv

Jan 19
2:00pm PST

Recap

Gonzaga Bulldogs 67, Santa Clara Broncos 61
Scoring by half: 37-34, 30-27
Pts: Sunny Greinacher 17; Rebs: Haiden Palmer 5 Asts: Danielle Walter 3	Pts: Ruta Zurauskyte 21; Rebs: Ruta Zuraskyte 7 Asts: Nici Gilday 3

Leavey Center
Santa Clara, CA
Attendance: 368
Referees: Melissa Barlow, Darren Krzesnik, Cheryl Flores

=== San Diego ===
Series History: Santa Clara leads 32-31

Jan 23
6:00 pm PST

Recap

Santa Clara Broncos 55, San Diego Toreros 79
Scoring by half: 29-39, 26-40
Pts: Jo Paine 13; Rebs: Ruta Zurauskyte 6 Asts: Raquel Avila 5	Pts: Sophia Ederaine 21; Rebs: Felicia Wijenberg 9 Asts: Amy Kame, Felicia Wijenberg, & Katherine Hamilton 3

Jenny Craig Pavilion
San Diego, CA
Attendance: 463
Referees: Kyle Bacon, Cathi Cornell, Alecia Murray

=== BYU ===
Series History: BYU leads 6-1
Broadcasters: Spencer Linton, Kristen Kozlowski, and Andy Boyce

BYUtv

Jan 25
2:05 pm MST

Recap

Santa Clara Broncos 44, BYU Cougars 61
Scoring by half: 19-33, 25-28
Pts: Rici Radanovich 16; Rebs: Marie Bertholdt 7 Asts: Montana Walters 3	Pts: Morgan Bailey 18; Rebs: Morgan Bailey & Ashley Garfield 13; Asts: Ashley Garfield 3

Marriott Center
Provo, UT
Attendance: 770
Referees: Brian Woods, Alejandro Moreno, Lisa Ulmer

=== Gonzaga ===
Series History: Gonzaga leads 30-27

Jan 30
6:00pm PST

Recap

Santa Clara Broncos 37, Gonzaga Bulldogs 89
Scoring by half: 17-45, 20-44
Pts: Jo Paine & Arteivia Lilomaiava 8 Rebs: Marie Bertholdt & Brooke Gallaway 4 Asts: Nici Gilday, Raquel Avila, Jo Paine, Montana Walters, Katie Hawkins, Courtney Lisowski, & Brooke Galloway 1	Pts: Shelby Cheslek 14; Rebs: Kiara Kudron 8 Asts: Jazmine Redmon 6

McCarthey Athletic Center
Spokane, WA
Attendance: 6,000
Referees: Lisa Jones, Benny Luna, Alex Carroll

=== Portland ===
Series History: Santa Clara leads 35-29

Feb 1
1:00 pm PST

Santa Clara Broncos 55, Portland Pilots 75
Scoring by half: 29-37, 26-38
Pts: Nici Gilday 16; Rebs: Jo Paine 7 Asts: Jo Paine 4	Pts: Kari Luttinen 23; Rebs: Cassandra Thompson 7 Asts: Jasmine Wooton & Amy Pupa 4

Chiles Center
Portland, OR
Attendance:
Referees: Penny Davis, Renee Robinson, In'Fini Robinson

=== BYU ===
Series History: BYU leads series 7-1
Broadcaster: Doug Greenwald

Feb 6
7:00 pm PST

Recap

BYU Cougars 87, Santa Clara Broncos 80 (OT)
Scoring by half: 30-40, 44-34 Overtime: 13-6
Pts: Lexi Eaton 31; Rebs: Jennifer Hamson 18; Asts: Kim Beeston 5	Pts: Nici Gilday 29; Rebs: Marie Bertholdt, Jo Paine, & Vanessa Leo 5 Asts: Jo Paine 5

Leavey Center
Santa Clara, CA
Attendance: N/A
Referees: Wanda Szermeta, Cheryl Flores, Bart Baldwin

=== San Diego ===
Series History: Series even 32-32

Feb 8
2:00 pm PST

Recap

San Diego Toreros 72, Santa Clara Broncos 44
Scoring by half: 28-26, 44-18
Pts: Amy Kame 19; Rebs: Felicia Wijenberg 9 Asts: Kameron Knutson 3	Pts: Nici Gilday 22; Rebs: Marie Bertholdt 5 Asts: Montana Walters 3

Leavey Center
Santa Clara, CA
Attendance: 564
Referees: Anita Ortega, Alejandro Moreno, Felecity Willis

=== San Francisco ===
Series History: Santa Clara leads 53-35

Feb 15
2:00 pm PST

Recap

Santa Clara Dons 74, San Francisco Dons 73
Scoring by half: 33-36, 41-37
Pts: Nici Gilday 21; Rebs: Marie Bertholdt 8 Asts: Montana Walters & Nici Gilday 3	Pts: Taylor Proctor 27; Rebs: Paige Spietz 8 Asts: Zhane Dikes & Taylor Proctor 3

War Memorial Gymnasium
San Francisco, CA
Attendance: 604
Referees: Richard Waters, Paul Patterson, Gordon Torigoe

=== Pacific ===
Series History: Santa Clara leads 25-17
Broadcaster: Don Gubbins

Feb 20
2:00 pm PST

Recap

Santa Clara Broncos 47, Pacific Tigers 64
Scoring by half: 23-35, 24-29
Pts: Nici Gilday 15; Rebs: Vanessa Leo 6 Asts: Montana Walters 4	Pts: Shanice Butler 13; Rebs: Kendall Kenyon 9 Asts: Kiki Moore 7

Alex G. Spanos Center
Stockton, CA
Attendance: 537
Referees: Lisa Jones, Bart Baldwin, Steve Belnap

=== Saint Mary's ===
Series History: Santa Clara leads 33-32

Feb 22
1:00 pm PST

Recap

Santa Clara Broncos 89, Saint Mary's Gaels 83
Scoring by half: 40-39, 49-44
Pts: Montana Walters 26; Rebs: Artei Lilomaiava 6 Asts: Montana Walters 7	Pts: Danielle Mauldin 24; Rebs: Danielle Mauldin 16; Asts: Jackie Nared & Kate Gaze 2

McKeon Pavilion
Moraga, CA
Attendance: 420
Referees: Shelly Russi, Bethany Graves, Lucy Banuelos

=== Loyola Marymount ===
Series History: Santa Clara leads 44-20

Feb 27
7:00 pm PST

Recap

Loyola Marymount Lions 88, Santa Clara Broncos 74
Scoring by half: 35-31, 53-43
Pts: Hazel Ramirez 21; Rebs: Mackenzie Kerins 14; Asts: Hazel Ramirez 9	Pts: Nici Gilday 40; Rebs: Marie Bertholdt & Jo Paine 9 Asts: Montana Walters 9

Leavey Center
Santa Clara, CA
Attendance: 375
Referees: Marianne Karp, Teresa Turner, Cheryl Flores

== Rankings ==
+ Regular season polls	Poll	Pre- Season	Week 1	Week 2	Week 3	Week 4	Week 5	Week 6	Week 7	Week 8	Week 9	Week 10	Week 11	Week 12	Week 13	Week 14	Week 15	Week 16	Week 17	Week 18	Final
AP	NR	NR	NR	NR																	
Coaches	NR	NR	NR	NR																	

Legend
	Increase in ranking
	Decrease in ranking
	No change
(RV)	Received votes
(NR)	Not ranked

== See also ==
- Santa Clara Broncos women's basketball
