= 2014 West Coast Conference women's basketball tournament =

- 2014 WCC Women's Tournament from Las Vegas
- Classification: Division I
- Season: 2013–14
- Teams: 10
- Finals site: Orleans Arena; Paradise, Nevada
- Champions: Gonzaga (6th title)
- Winning coach: Kelly Graves (6th title)
- MVP: Sunny Greinacher (Gonzaga)
- Television: ESPNU/BYUtv

2013–14 West Coast Conference women's basketball standings
	Conf.				Overall
Team	W		L	PCT	W		L	PCT
No. 18 Gonzaga†	16	–	2	.889	29	–	5	.853
BYU	14	–	4	.778	28	–	7	.800
Pacific	12	–	6	.667	18	–	13	.581
Saint Mary's	11	–	7	.611	23	–	10	.697
San Diego	11	–	7	.611	24	–	9	.727
Portland	7	–	11	.389	14	–	16	.467
Santa Clara	6	–	12	.333	10	–	20	.333
San Francisco	6	–	12	.333	12	–	19	.387
Loyola Marymount	6	–	12	.333	9	–	21	.300
Pepperdine	1	–	17	.056	6	–	25	.194
† 2014 WCC tournament winner As of March 29, 2014; Rankings from AP Poll

The 2014 West Coast Conference women's basketball tournament was held March 6–11, 2014, at Orleans Arena in the Las Vegas Valley community of Paradise, Nevada. This was the sixth consecutive year the WCC Tournament took place in Vegas after the WCC and the Orleans Hotel and Casino, which operates the arena, reached a 3-year extension to keep the tournament in Vegas through 2016.

== Format ==
With the addition of the University of the Pacific, bringing the WCC to 10 members, the conference adopted a more traditional tournament format. Under the new format, the top 6 seeds receive a bye out of the first round while the 7 seed plays the 10 seed and the 8 seed plays the 9 seed. The first round begins on a Thursday. BYUtv airs all games, except for the championship, and simulcasts them on the WCC's streaming video outlet, TheW.tv. The tournament championship airs on ESPNU.

The former second round is now the quarterfinal round. It takes place on Friday and has the 1 seed playing the winner of the 8/9 game and the 2 seed playing the winner of the 7/10 game. The quarterfinals also feature the 3 seed playing the 6 seed, and the 4 seed playing the 5 seed.

After two off-days, the semifinals take place on Monday with the winner of 1/8/9 playing the winner of 4/5 and the winner of 2/7/10 playing the winner of 3/6.

The championship takes place on Tuesday and features the semifinal winners. As in the recent past, the championship game continues to be broadcast on ESPNU.

== Seeds ==
2014 West Coast Conference women's basketball tournament seeds
Seed	School	Conference Record	Overall Record (End of Regular season)	Tiebreaker
1.	Gonzaga	16-2	26-4	
2.	BYU	14-4	24-5	
3.	Pacific	12-6	17-11	
4.	Saint Mary's	11-7	21-8	1-1 vs. Gonzaga
5.	San Diego	11-7	22-7	0-2 vs. Gonzaga
6.	Portland	7-11	14-15	
7.	Santa Clara	6-12	10-19	3-1 vs. USF & LMU
8.	San Francisco	6-12	11-18	2-2 vs. Santa Clara & LMU
9.	Loyola Marymount	6-12	9-20	1-3 vs. Santa Clara & USF
10.	Pepperdine	1-17	5-24	

== Schedule ==
Session	Game	Time*	Matchup^{#}
First round – Thursday, March 6
1	1	12:00 PM	#7 Santa Clara vs. #10 Pepperdine
1	2	2:00 PM	#8 San Francisco vs. #9 Loyola Marymount
Quarterfinals – Friday, March 7
2	3	12:00 PM	#3 Pacific vs. #6 Portland
2	4	2:00 PM	#2 BYU vs. #10 Pepperdine
3	5	6:00 PM	#1 Gonzaga vs. #8 San Francisco
3	6	8:00 PM	#4 Saint Mary's vs. #5 San Diego
Semifinals – Monday, March 10
4	7	12:00 PM	#1 Gonzaga vs. #4 Saint Mary's
4	8	2:00 PM	#2 BYU vs. #3 Pacific
Championship Game – Tuesday, March 11
5	9	1:00 PM	#1 Gonzaga vs. #2 BYU
*Game Times in PT. #-Rankings denote tournament seeding.

== Bracket and scores ==
First round Thursday, March 6 BYUtv
8	San Francisco	63
9	Loyola Marymount	62
7	Santa Clara	74
10	Pepperdine	80

Quarterfinals; Friday, March 7 BYUtv
1	Gonzaga	81
8	San Francisco	68
4	Saint Mary's	60
5	San Diego	58
2	BYU	77
10	Pepperdine	51
3	Pacific	84
6	Portland	72

Semifinals; Monday, March 10; BYUtv
1	Gonzaga	68
4	Saint Mary's	60
2	BYU	77
3	Pacific	64

Championship game Tuesday, March 11; ESPNU
1	Gonzaga	71
2	BYU	57

== Game summaries ==
=== Pepperdine vs. Santa Clara ===
Series History: Pepperdine leads 34-33
Broadcasters: Spencer Linton & Kristen Kozlowski

BYUtv

Mar 6
12:00 pm PST

Recap

Pepperdine Waves 80, Santa Clara Broncos 74
Scoring by half: 32-26, 48-48
Pts: Ea Shoushtari 30; Rebs: Amanda Lovely 9 Asts: Keitra Wallace 4	Pts: Nici Gilday 27; Rebs: Jo Paine 9 Asts: Montana Walters 4

Orleans Arena
Paradise, NV
Attendance: N/A
Referees: Michelle Russi, Bart Baldwin, Brian Woods

=== Loyola Marymount vs. San Francisco ===
Series History: Series even 33-33
Broadcasters: Spencer Linton & Kristen Kozlowski

BYUtv

Mar 6
2:00 pm PST

Recap

Loyola Marymount Lions 62, San Francisco Dons 63
Scoring by half: 34-27, 28-36
Pts: Deanna Johnson 16; Rebs: Mackenzie Keirns 15; Asts: Hazel Ramirez 7	Pts: Taj Winston 16; Rebs: Taj Winston 9 Asts: Taj Winston 5

Orleans Arena
Paradise, NV
Attendance: 7,688
Referees: Darren Krzesnik, Wanda Szeremeta, Ken Nash

=== Pacific vs. Portland ===
Series History: Portland leads 7-3
Broadcasters: Spencer Linton & Kristen Kozlowski
This game would become the final game for Portland coach Jim Sollars, who would retire after 28 seasons. During his post-game press conference, Sollars would thank his wife for all the hardships he put her through. His exact words, "Before I go I have to say one thing... I always forget the most important person in this whole thing. My wife has been through approximately 40 years of weekends with 13 beautiful women and all the complaining that I bring home. And I cannot thank her enough."

BYUtv

Mar 7
12:00 pm PST

Recap

Portland Pilots 72, Pacific Tigers 84
Scoring by half: 33-44, 39-40
Pts: Kari Luttinen 22; Rebs: Amy Pupa 11; Asts: Hannah Mattson, Jasmine Wooton, & Amy Pupa 3	Pts: Kiki Moore 28; Rebs: Kendall Kenyon 9 Asts: Madison Parrish & Kiki Moore 4

Orleans Arena
Paradise, NV
Attendance: N/A
Referees: Bart Baldwin, Kenneth Nash, Tiffany Bird

=== Pepperdine vs. BYU ===
Series History: BYU leads 7-2
Broadcasters: Spencer Linton & Kristen Kozlowski

BYUtv

Mar 7
2:00 pm PST

Recap

Pepperdine Waves 51, BYU Cougars 77
Scoring by half: 22-42, 29-35
Pts: Keitra Wallace 14; Rebs: Grace Leah Baughn & Allie Green 7 Asts: Ea Shoushtari 4	Pts: Lexi Eaton & Morgan Bailey 17; Rebs: Ashley Garfield 13; Asts: Kim Beeston 7

Orleans Arena
Paradise, NV
Attendance: N/A
Referees: Wanda Szeremeta, Benny Luna, Gordon Torigoe

=== Gonzaga vs. San Francisco ===
Series History: Gonzaga leads 33-24
Broadcasters: Dave McCann & Blaine Fowler

BYUtv

Mar 7
6:00 pm PST

Recap

San Francisco Dons 68, Gonzaga Bulldogs 81
Scoring by half: 27-38, 41-43
Pts: Taylor Proctor 28; Rebs: Taylor Proctor 8 Asts: Zhane Dikes 4	Pts: Sunny Greinacher 22; Rebs: Shelby Cheslek 10; Asts: Haiden Palmer & Jazmine Redmon 4

Orleans Arena
Paradise, NV
Attendance: N/A
Referees: Darren Krzesnik, Brian Woods, Bethany Graves

=== San Diego vs. Saint Mary's ===
Series History: Saint Mary's leads 38-27
Broadcasters: Dave McCann & Blaine Fowler

BYUtv

Mar 7
8:00 pm PST

Recap

San Diego Toreros 58, Saint Mary's Gaels 61
Scoring by half: 33-23, 25-37
Pts: Amy Kame 12; Rebs: Amy Kame 9 Asts: Amy Kame 3	Pts: Jackie Nared 20; Rebs: Danielle Mauldin 11; Asts: Kate Gaze 5

Orleans Arena
Paradise, NV
Attendance: N/A
Referees: Michelle Russi, Richard Waters, Ify Seales

=== Gonzaga vs. Saint Mary's ===
Series History: Gonzaga leads 34-25
Broadcasters: Dave McCann & Blaine Fowler

BYUtv

Mar 10
12:00 pm PST

Saint Mary's Gaels 60, Gonzaga Bulldogs 68
Scoring by half: 26-37, 34-31
Pts: Jackie Nared 29; Rebs: Jackie Nared & Danielle Mauldin 11; Asts: Kate Gaze 2	Pts: Haiden Palmer 16; Rebs: Shelby Cheslek 14; Asts: Jazmine Redmon 3

Orleans Arena
Paradise, NV
Attendance: N/A
Referees: Karen Lasuik, Bart Baldwin, Cheryl Flores

=== BYU vs. Pacific ===
Series History: BYU leads 6-2
Broadcasters: Dave McCann & Blaine Fowler

BYUtv

Mar 10
2:00 pm PST

Pacific Tigers 64, BYU Cougars 77
Scoring by half: 24-35, 40-42
Pts: Kiki Moore 26; Rebs: Sam Pettinger 9 Asts: Madison Parrish 4	Pts: Stephanie Rovetti 15; Rebs: Jennifer Hamson 8 Asts: Kim Beeston and Lexi Eaton 3

Orleans Arena
Paradise, NV
Attendance: N/A
Referees: Michelle Russi, Darren Kresnik, Brian Woods

=== WCC Championship: BYU vs. Gonzaga ===
Series History: Gonzaga leads 8-6
Broadcasters: Dave Flemming & Sean Farnham (ESPNU)
Dave McCann & Blaine Fowler (BYU Radio)

ESPNU
BYU Radio

Mar 11
1:00 pm PST

BYU Cougars 57, Gonzaga Bulldogs 71
Scoring by half: 14-30, 43-41
Pts: Jennifer Hamson 24; Rebs: Jennifer Hamson & Lexi Eaton 7 Asts: Kim Beeston 5	Pts: Keani Albanez 20; Rebs: Sunny Greinacher 7 Asts: Jazmine Redmon 5

Orleans Arena
Paradise, NV
Attendance: 7,898
Referees: Bob Scofield, Cathi Cornell, Michol Murray

== All tournament team ==
Tournament MVP in bold.

Name	School	Pos.	Year	Ht.	Hometown
**Sunny Greinacher**	Gonzaga	F	Junior	6-4	Essen, Germany
Jennifer Hamson	BYU	C	Senior	6-7	Lindon, Utah
KiKi Moore	Pacific	G	Senior	5-8	San Francisco, California
Jazmine Redmon	Gonzaga	G	Senior	5-9	Spokane, Washington
Lindsay Sherbert	Gonzaga	G	Junior	6-0	Temecula, California

== See also ==
- 2013–14 NCAA Division I women's basketball season
- West Coast Conference men's basketball tournament
- 2014 West Coast Conference men's basketball tournament
- 2013–14 West Coast Conference women's basketball season
- West Coast Conference women's basketball tournament
