= 2013–14 Gonzaga Bulldogs women's basketball team =

Intercollegiate basketball season

2013–14 Gonzaga Bulldogs women's basketball

WCC Regular Season and Tournament Champions

NCAA, L, 1st Round, James Madison
- Conference: West Coast Conference

Ranking
- Coaches: No. 22
- AP: No. 18
- Record: 29–5 (16–2 WCC)
- Head coach: Kelly Graves (14th season)
- Assistant coaches: Jodie Kaczor Berry; Lisa Fortier; Nicole Powell
- Home arena: McCarthey Athletic Center

2013–14 West Coast Conference women's basketball standings
	Conf.				Overall
Team	W		L	PCT	W		L	PCT
No. 18 Gonzaga†	16	–	2	.889	29	–	5	.853
BYU	14	–	4	.778	28	–	7	.800
Pacific	12	–	6	.667	18	–	13	.581
Saint Mary's	11	–	7	.611	23	–	10	.697
San Diego	11	–	7	.611	24	–	9	.727
Portland	7	–	11	.389	14	–	16	.467
Santa Clara	6	–	12	.333	10	–	20	.333
San Francisco	6	–	12	.333	12	–	19	.387
Loyola Marymount	6	–	12	.333	9	–	21	.300
Pepperdine	1	–	17	.056	6	–	25	.194
† 2014 WCC tournament winner As of March 29, 2014; Rankings from AP Poll

The 2013–14 Gonzaga Bulldogs women's basketball team represented Gonzaga University in the 2013–14 college basketball season. The Bulldogs (also informally referred to as the "Zags"), members of the West Coast Conference, were led by head coach Kelly Graves, in his 14th, and final season at the school. The Zags played most of their home games at the McCarthey Athletic Center on the university campus in Spokane, Washington. The Zags would win both the regular and tournament season titles and finish ranked 18th in the AP Poll with a 29–5 record. The Zags were upset in the 1st Round of the NCAA Tournament to end their season. After the season, Kelly Graves would be hired as the new head coach at Oregon, and Lisa Fortier would be named the new Zags head coach.

== Before the Season ==
Gonzaga was picked to win the WCC Championship.

== Roster ==
2013–14 Gonzaga Bulldogs women's basketball team
Players
Coaches

Pos.	#	Name	Height	Year	Previous school	Hometown
G/F	1	Chelsea Waters	6 ft 1 in (1.85 m)	So	Lewiston	Lewiston, ID
G	3	Haiden Palmer	5 ft 8 in (1.73 m)	Sr	Vista Del Largo / Oregon State	Moreno Valley, CA
G	5	Maiki Viela	5 ft 6 in (1.68 m)	Jr	Lahainaluna	Lahaina, HI
G	10	Danielle Walter	6 ft 0 in (1.83 m)	Jr	Pasco	Pasco, WA
G	11	Laura Sullivan	5 ft 4 in (1.63 m)	Jr	Holy Names Academy	Seattle, WA
C	12	Emma Wolfram	6 ft 5 in (1.96 m)	Fr	South Kamloops	Kamloops, BC
F	14	Sunny Greinacher	6 ft 4 in (1.93 m)	Jr	Grashof Gymnasium	Essen, Germany
F	22	Shaniqua Nilles	6 ft 0 in (1.83 m)	RS So	West Valley	Spokane, WA
F	23	Kiara Kudron	6 ft 2 in (1.88 m)	So	Huron	New Boston, MI
G	24	Keani Albanez	5 ft 10 in (1.78 m)	Jr	Buena	Santa Barbara, CA
C	30	Stephanie Golden	6 ft 3 in (1.91 m)	Sr	Miramonte	Clayton, CA
G	31	Elle Tinkle	6 ft 2 in (1.88 m)	So	Big Sky	Missoula, MT
G	33	Lindsay Sherbert	6 ft 0 in (1.83 m)	Jr	Great Oak / California	Temecula, CA
G	34	Jazmine Redmon	5 ft 9 in (1.75 m)	Sr	Mead	Spokane, WA
C	44	Shelby Cheslek	6 ft 5 in (1.96 m)	RS So	Pullman	Pullman, WA

Head coach

Kelly Graves

Assistant coach(es)

Jodie Kaczor Berry
Lisa Mispley Fortier
Nicole Powell

Legend

- (C) Team captain
- (S) Suspended
- (I) Ineligible
- (W) Walk-on
- Injured
- Current redshirt

Roster
Last update: 2013-10-02

== Schedule ==
Date time, TV	Rank^{#}	Opponent^{#}	Result	Record	Site (attendance) city, state
Regular Season
11/08/2013*; 6:00 pm	No. 25	Idaho; Preseason WNIT First Round	W 64–56	1–0	McCarthey Athletic Center (5,607); Spokane, WA
11/10/2013*; 2:00 pm	No. 25	UT Martin; Preseason WNIT Second Round	W 91–54	2–0	McCarthey Athletic Center (4,848); Spokane, WA
11/14/2013*; 5:00 pm, FSSW+/FCS Central	No. 25	at No. 11 Oklahoma; Preseason WNIT Semifinals	L 78–82	2–1	Lloyd Noble Center (4,736); Norman, OK
11/20/2013*; 6:00 pm, SWX	No. 24	Eastern Washington	W 78–58	3–1	McCarthey Athletic Center (5,375); Spokane, WA
11/30/2013*; 2:00 pm	No. 24	Colgate	W 81–31	4–1	McCarthey Athletic Center (5,220); Spokane, WA
12/02/2013*; 6:00 pm, SWX	No. 24	Fairfield	W 82–42	5–1	McCarthey Athletic Center (4,823); Spokane, WA
12/06/2013*; 6:00 pm	No. 24	Portland State	W 96–47	6–1	McCarthey Athletic Center (5,316); Spokane, WA
12/08/2013*; 9:00 am	No. 24	at Ohio State	W 59–58	7–1	Value City Arena (6,409); Columbus, OH
12/10/2013*; 5:00 pm	No. 23	at Wisconsin	W 70–55	8–1	Kohl Center (3,043); Madison, WI
12/14/2013*; 1:00 pm, P12N	No. 23	at No. 6 Stanford	L 45–73	8–2	Maples Pavilion (N/A); Palo Alto, CA
12/16/2013*; 6:00 pm	No. 25	UC Riverside	W 87–43	9–2	McCarthey Athletic Center (5,124); Spokane, WA
12/21/2013*; 11:30 am, P12N	No. 25	at Washington State	W 69–62	10–2	Beasley Coliseum (1,280); Pullman, WA
12/28/2013*; 1:00 pm	No. 24	at Saint Mary's	L 78–79	10–3 (0–1)	McKeon Pavilion (616); Moraga, CA
12/30/2014; 5:30 pm		at Pacific	W 83–68	11–3 (1–1)	Alex G. Spanos Center (4,015); Stockton, CA
01/03/2014; 7:00 pm		at Portland	W 56–24	12–3 (2–1)	Chiles Center (670); Portland, OR
01/09/2014; 6:00 pm, SWX		BYU	W 68–42	13–3 (3–1)	McCarthey Athletic Center (5,424); Spokane, WA
01/11/2014; 2:00 pm		No. 24 San Diego	W 79–50	14–3 (4–1)	McCarthey Athletic Center (5,536); Spokane, WA
01/17/2014; 7:00 pm		at San Francisco	W 68–40	15–3 (5–1)	War Memorial Gymnasium (363); San Francisco, CA
01/19/2014; 2:00 pm, TheW.tv		at Santa Clara	W 67–61	16–3 (6–1)	Leavey Center (368); Santa Clara, CA
01/23/2014; 7:00 pm	No. 25	at Loyola Marymount	W 91–82 ^{OT}	17–3 (7–1)	Gersten Pavilion (304); Los Angeles, CA
01/25/2014; 2:00 pm, TV-32	No. 25	at Pepperdine	W 69–39	18–3 (8–1)	Firestone Fieldhouse (409); Malibu, California
01/30/2014; 6:00 pm	No. 22	Santa Clara	W 89–37	19–3 (9–1)	McCarthey Athletic Center (6,000); Spokane, WA
02/01/2014; 2:00 pm	No. 22	San Francisco	W 101–66	20–3 (10–1)	McCarthey Athletic Center (5,476); Spokane, WA
02/06/2014; 6:00 pm	No. 20	Pepperdine	W 86–51	21–3 (11–1)	McCarthey Athletic Center (4,951); Spokane, WA
02/08/2014; 2:00 pm, SWX	No. 20	Loyola Marymount	W 88–51	22–3 (12–1)	McCarthey Athletic Center (5,739); Spokane, WA
02/13/2014; 6:00 pm, TheW.tv	No. 20	at San Diego	W 66–48	23–3 (13–1)	Jenny Craig Pavilion (1,408); San Diego, CA
02/15/2014; 1:00 pm, BYUtv	No. 20	at BYU	L 52–62	23–4 (13–2)	Marriott Center (978); Provo, UT
02/22/2014; 2:00 pm	No. 24	Portland	W 72–61	24–4 (14–2)	McCarthey Athletic Center (6,000); Spokane, WA
02/27/2014; 6:00 pm, SWX	No. 22	Saint Mary's	W 75–65	25–4 (15–2)	McCarthey Athletic Center (5,496); Spokane, WA
03/01/2014; 2:00 pm	No. 22	Pacific	W 81–77	26–4 (16–2)	McCarthey Athletic Center (5,882); Spokane, WA
2014 WCC Tournament
03/07/2014; 6:00 pm, BYUtv	No. 19	vs. San Francisco; Quarterfinals	W 81–68	27–4	Orleans Arena (N/A); Las Vegas, NV
03/10/2014; 12:00 pm, BYUtv	No. 19	vs. Saint Mary's; Semifinals	W 71–57	28–4	Orleans Arena (N/A); Las Vegas, NV
03/11/2014; 1:00 pm, ESPNU	No. 18	vs. BYU; Championship	W 71–57	29–4	Orleans Arena (7,898); Las Vegas, NV
2014 NCAA Tournament
03/23/2014; 2:30 pm, ESPN	No. 18	vs. James Madison; First Round	L 63–72	29–5	Reed Arena (N/A); College Station, TX
*Non-conference game. ^{#}Rankings from AP Poll. (#) Tournament seedings in parentheses. All times are in Pacific Time.

== Rankings ==
2013–14 NCAA Division I women's basketball rankings

Regular season polls
Poll	Pre- Season	Week 2	Week 3	Week 4	Week 5	Week 6	Week 7	Week 8	Week 9	Week 10	Week 11	Week 12	Week 13	Week 14	Week 15	Week 16	Week 17	Week 18	Week 19	Final
AP	25	25	24	24	24	23	25	24	RV	RV	RV	25	22	20	20	24	22	21	18	
Coaches	RV	RV	25	24	24	22	22	21	RV	RV	23	22	17	15	15	20	20	19	16	22

Legend
	Increase in ranking
	Decrease in ranking
	No change
(RV)	Received votes
(NR)	Not ranked

== See also ==
2013–14 Gonzaga Bulldogs men's basketball team
