= 2013–14 San Francisco Dons women's basketball team =

Intercollegiate basketball season

2013–14 San Francisco Dons women's basketball
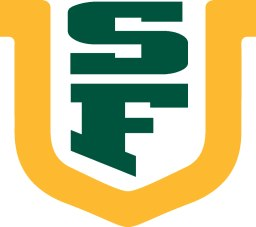
- Conference: West Coast Conference
- Record: 12–19 (6–12 WCC)
- Head coach: Jennifer Azzi (4th season)
- Assistant coaches: Blair Hardiek; Molly Marrin; Shanele Stires
- Home arena: War Memorial Gymnasium

2013–14 West Coast Conference women's basketball standings
	Conf.				Overall
Team	W		L	PCT	W		L	PCT
No. 18 Gonzaga†	16	–	2	.889	29	–	5	.853
BYU	14	–	4	.778	28	–	7	.800
Pacific	12	–	6	.667	18	–	13	.581
Saint Mary's	11	–	7	.611	23	–	10	.697
San Diego	11	–	7	.611	24	–	9	.727
Portland	7	–	11	.389	14	–	16	.467
Santa Clara	6	–	12	.333	10	–	20	.333
San Francisco	6	–	12	.333	12	–	19	.387
Loyola Marymount	6	–	12	.333	9	–	21	.300
Pepperdine	1	–	17	.056	6	–	25	.194
† 2014 WCC tournament winner As of March 29, 2014; Rankings from AP Poll

The 2013–14 San Francisco Dons women's basketball team represented the University of San Francisco in the 2013–14 college basketball season. It was head coach Jennifer Azzi's fourth season at San Francisco. The Dons were members of the West Coast Conference and played their home games at the War Memorial Gymnasium.

== Roster ==
2013–14 San Francisco Dons women's basketball team
Players
Coaches

Pos.	#	Name	Height	Year	Previous school	Hometown
G	1	Zhane Dykes	5 ft 9 in (1.75 m)	So	Bishop Gorman	Las Vegas, NV
G	2	Taj Winston	5 ft 10 in (1.78 m)	Jr	Long Beach Poly	Long Beach, CA
F	3	Paige Spietz	6 ft 3 in (1.91 m)	Sr	Missouri	Brimfield, IL
G	5	Aundrea Gordon	5 ft 7 in (1.7 m)	Jr	McKinney	McKinney, TX
F	12	Byrn Stark	6 ft 0 in (1.83 m)	So	Bishops' School	La Jolla, CA
G	13	Jamie Katuna	5 ft 7 in (1.7 m)	Jr	Longmont	Longmont, CO
G	15	Rachel Howard	5 ft 10 in (1.78 m)	Fr	Berkeley	Berkeley, CA
G	21	Alexa Hardick	5 ft 7 in (1.7 m)	Sr	Bishop Lynch	Dallas, TX
F	22	Claudia Price	5 ft 11 in (1.8 m)	Fr	West Mesquite	Mesquite, TX
F	25	Alicia Scafidi	6 ft 1 in (1.85 m)	Jr	Sam Barlow	Gresham, OR
F	32	Taylor Proctor	6 ft 0 in (1.83 m)	So	Sand Creek	Colorado Springs, CO
F	33	Denae Mary Williams	6 ft 1 in (1.85 m)	So	Rialto	Rialto, CA
G	35	Kalyn Simon	5 ft 9 in (1.75 m)	Fr	Archbishop Mitty	San Jose, CA
F	44	Hashima Carothers	5 ft 11 in (1.8 m)	Fr	Eastside College Prep	Las Vegas, NV

Head coach

- Jennifer Azzi (Stanford)

Assistant coach(es)

- Blair Hardiek (Missouri)
- Molly Marrin (Regis University)
- Shanele Stires (Kansas State)

Legend

- (C) Team captain
- (S) Suspended
- (I) Ineligible
- (W) Walk-on
- Injured
- Current redshirt

Roster

== Schedule and results ==
Date time, TV	Rank^{#}	Opponent^{#}	Result	Record	Site city, state
Exhibition Season
11/02/2013*; 2:00 pm, USF TV		CS Chico	W 82–67	-	War Memorial Gymnasium; San Francisco, CA
11/13/2013*; 7:00 pm, USF TV		Dominican	W 96–59	-	War Memorial Gymnasium; San Francisco, CA
Regular season
11/08/2013*; 4:00 pm, SNY		at Fordham	L 66–80	0–1	Rose Hill Gymnasium; Bronx, NY
11/10/2013*; 11:00 am		at Columbia	W 83–69	1–1	Levien Gymnasium; New York City, NY
11/17/2013*; 2:00 pm, USF TV		Long Beach State	L 82–85 ^{2OT}	1–2	War Memorial Gymnasium; San Francisco, CA
11/20/2013*; 7:00 pm, MW Net		at San Jose State	L 79–98	1–3	San Jose State Event Center; San Jose, CA
11/29/2013*; 5:00 pm, BigWest.TV		vs. UC Davis; Cal Poly Holiday Classic	W 69–67	2–3	Mott Gym; San Luis Obispo, CA
11/30/2013*; 7:00 pm, BigWest.TV		at Cal Poly; Cal Poly Holiday Classic	L 65–76	2–4	Mott Gym; San Luis Obispo, CA
12/06/2013*; 7:00 pm, USF TV		UNLV	W 62–61	3–4	War Memorial Gymnasium; San Francisco, CA
12/11/2013*; 7:00 pm, USF TV		Cal State Bakersfield	L 70–85	3–5	War Memorial Gymnasium; San Francisco, CA
12/14/2013*; 1:00 pm, MW Net		at Boise State	W 76–70	4–5	Taco Bell Arena; Boise, ID
12/18/2017*; 7:00 pm, USF TV		UMKC	L 62–70 ^{OT}	4–6	War Memorial Gymnasium; San Francisco, CA
12/20/2013*; 7:00 pm, MW Net		at Fresno State	W 76–47	5–6	Save Mart Center; Fresno, CA
12/30/2013; 7:00 pm		at Santa Clara	L 72–81	5–7 (0–1)	Leavey Center; Santa Clara, CA
01/02/2014; 7:00 pm		at Loyola Marymount	W 80–76	6–7 (1–1)	Gersten Pavilion; Los Angeles, CA
01/04/2014; 2:00 pm, TV-32		at Pepperdine	W 77–61	7–7 (2–1)	Firestone Fieldhouse; Malibu, CA
01/09/2014; 7:00 pm		Pacific	L 67–80	7–8 (2–2)	War Memorial Gymnasium; San Francisco, CA
01/11/2014; 2:00 pm		Saint Mary's	L 67–86	7–9 (2–3)	War Memorial Gymnasium; San Francisco, CA
01/17/2014; 7:00 pm		Gonzaga	L 40–68	7–10 (2–4)	War Memorial Gymnasium; San Francisco, CA
01/19/2014; 2:00 pm		Portland	L 72–82	7–11 (2–5)	War Memorial Gymnasium; San Francisco, CA
01/23/2014; 6:00 pm, BYUtv		at BYU	L 47–81	7–12 (2–6)	Marriott Center; Provo, UT
01/25/2014; 2:00 pm		at San Diego	L 58–76	7–13 (2–7)	Jenny Craig Pavilion; San Diego, CA
01/30/2014; 7:00 pm		at Portland	W 74–73	8–13 (3–7)	Chiles Center; Portland, OR
02/01/2014; 2:00 pm		at No. 22 Gonzaga	L 66–101	8–14 (3–8)	McCarthey Athletic Center; Spokane, WA
02/06/2014; 7:00 pm		San Diego	W 78–74	9–14 (4–8)	War Memorial Gymnasium; San Francisco, CA
02/08/2014; 7:00 pm		BYU	L 66–73	9–15 (4–9)	War Memorial Gymnasium; San Francisco, CA
02/15/2014; 2:00 pm		Santa Clara	L 73–74	9–16 (4–10)	War Memorial Gymnasium; San Francisco, CA
02/20/2014; 6:00 pm		at Saint Mary's	L 64–83	9–17 (4–11)	McKeon Pavilion; Moraga, CA
02/22/2014; 2:00 pm, TheW.tv		at Pacific	L 65–83	9–18 (4–12)	Alex G. Spanos Center; Stockton, CA
02/27/2014; 7:00 pm		Pepperdine	W 75–61	10–18 (5–12)	War Memorial Gymnasium; San Francisco, CA
03/01/2014; 2:00 pm		Loyola Marymount	W 80–79	11–18 (6–12)	War Memorial Gymnasium; San Francisco, CA
2014 West Coast Conference women's basketball tournament
03/06/2014; 2:00 pm, BYUtv		vs. Loyola Marymount; 1st Round	W 63–62	12–18	Orleans Arena; Las Vegas, NV
03/07/2014; 6:00 pm, BYUtv		vs. No. 19 Gonzaga	L 68–81	12–19	Orleans Arena; Las Vegas, NV
*Non-conference game. ^{#}Rankings from AP Poll. (#) Tournament seedings in parentheses. All times are in Pacific Time.

== Game summaries ==
=== Exhibition: Cal State Chico ===
USF TV

Nov 2
2:00 pm PDT

Recap

Cal State Chico Wildcats 67, San Francisco Dons 82
Scoring by half: 32-35, 35-47
Pts: Jazmine Miller 20; Rebs: Jazmine Miller 6 Asts: Courtney Hamilton 3	Pts: Zhane Dikes 20; Rebs: Taj Winston 10; Asts: Taj Winston & Taylor Proctor 2

War Memorial Gymnasium
San Francisco, CA
Attendance: 210
Referees: Wanda Szeremeta, Alejandro, Ify Seales

=== Fordham ===
Series history: San Francisco leads series 2–1
Broadcasters: Dave Raymond & Julianne Viani

SNY

Nov 8
4:00 pm EST

Recap

San Francisco Dons 66, Fordham Rams 80
Scoring by half: 38-47, 28-33
Pts: Taj Winston 19; Rebs: Paige Spietz & Taylor Proctor 7 Asts: Zhane Dikes 3	Pts: Abigail Corning 22; Rebs: Erin Rooney 10; Asts: Abigail Corning 6

Rose Hill Gymnasium
Bronx, NY
Attendance: N/A
Referees: Pastor Torres, Hillary Harwell, Carlos Alvarez

=== Columbia ===
Nov 10
2:00 pm EST

Recap

San Francisco Dons 83, Columbia Lions 69
Scoring by half: 37-34, 46-35
Pts: Rachel Howard 18; Rebs: Taj Winston & Paige Spietz 5 Asts: Zhane Dikes 3	Pts: Miwa Tachibana 13; Rebs: Courtney Bradford 5 Asts: Taylor Ward 5

Levien Gymnasium
Bronx, NY
Attendance: 388
Referees: Jon Levinson, Corey Pothier, Zoe Robbins

=== Exhibition: Dominican ===
USF TV

Nov 13
5:30 pm PST

Recap

Dominican Penguins 59, San Francisco Dons 96
Scoring by half: 40-51, 19-45
Pts: Noelle Roldan & Lauren Hyatt 11; Rebs: Salonika Quewon-Owe 12; Asts: Danielle Yamauchi 3	Pts: Taj Winston 26; Rebs: Paige Spietz 12; Asts: Aundrea Gordon 4

War Memorial Gymnasium
San Francisco, CA
Attendance: N/A
Referees: Kyle Bacon, Paul Patterson, Lisa Ulmer

=== Long Beach State ===
USF TV

Nov 17
2:00 pm PST

Recap

Long Beach State 49ers 85, San Francisco Dons 82 (OT)
Scoring by half: 30-28, 31-33 Overtime: 9-9, 15-12
Pts: Raven Benton 22; Rebs: Raven Benton 9 Asts: Alex Sanchez 4	Pts: Rachel Howard 16; Rebs: Taj Winston 12; Asts: Zhane Dikes, Rachel Howard & Taylor Proctor 3

War Memorial Gymnasium
San Francisco, CA
Attendance: 343
Referees: Rick Showers, Michelle Russi, Skelly Wingard

=== San Jose State ===
MW Net

Nov 20
5:30 pm PST

Recap

San Francisco Dons 79, San Jose State Spartans 98
Scoring by half: 30-50, 49-48
Pts: Jamie Katuna 20; Rebs: Claudia Price 12; Asts: Zhane Dikes & Taj Winston 3	Pts: Rebecca Woodberry 29; Rebs: Jasmine Smith 11; Asts: Britta Hall 8

San Jose State Event Center
San Jose, CA
Attendance: 271
Referees: Jack Jones, Mazetta Garrett, Darla Foutz

=== UC Davis ===
BigWest.tv

Nov 29
7:00 pm PST

Recap

San Francisco Dons 69, UC Davis Aggies 67
Scoring by half: 34-29, 35-38
Pts: Rachel Howard 17; Rebs: Taj Winston 8 Asts: Taj Winston 4	Pts: Sydnee Fipps 17; Rebs: Celia Marfone 7 Asts: Sydnee Fipps 4

Mott Gym
San Luis Obispo, CA
Attendance: 179
Referees: Kevin Rose, Banal Hoyt, Terry Ogle

=== Cal Poly ===
BigWest.tv

Nov 30
7:00 pm PST

Recap

San Francisco Dons 65, Cal Poly Mustangs 76
Scoring by half: 30-36, 35-40
Pts: Rachel Howard 18; Rebs: Zhane Dikes 12; Asts: Rachel Howard 4	Pts: Molly Schlemer 21; Rebs: Molly Schlemer 10; Asts: Ariana Elegado 10

Mott Gym
San Luis Obispo, CA
Attendance: 512
Referees: Kimberly Hobbs, Tony Feroah, Chris Chapin

=== UNLV ===
USF TV

Dec 6
7:00 pm PST

Recap

UNLV Lady Rebels 61, San Francisco Dons 62
Scoring by half: 33-23, 28-39
Pts: Alana Cesarz 19; Rebs: Aley Rhode 10; Asts: Jehiah Cook & Briana Charles 2	Pts: Zhane Dikes 17; Rebs: Claudia Price 8 Asts: Rachel Howard 3

War Memorial Gymnasium
San Francisco, CA
Attendance: 552
Referees: Melissa Barlow, Bob Scofield, Cheryl Flores

=== Cal State Bakersfield ===
USF TV

Dec 11
7:00 pm PST

Recap

Cal State Bakersfield Roadrunners 85, San Francisco Dons 70
Scoring by half: 49-39, 36-31
Pts: Tyonna Outland 18; Rebs: Batabe Zempare & Tyonna Outland 8 Asts: Melissa Sweat & Tyonna Outland 3	Pts: Zhane Dikes 18; Rebs: Taj Winston 8 Asts: Zhane Dikes 3

War Memorial Gymnasium
San Francisco, CA
Attendance: 222
Referees: Michol Murray, Penny Davis, Lucy Banuelos

=== Boise State ===
MW Net

Dec 14
1:05 pm MST

Recap

San Francisco Dons 76, Boise State Broncos 70
Scoring by half: 37-38, 39-32
Pts: Rachel Howard 20; Rebs: Paige Spietz & Hashima Carothers 5 Asts: Zhane Dikes 6	Pts: Miquelle Askew 13; Rebs: Lexi Der & Keiahnna Engel 7 Asts: Yaiza Rodriguez 7

Taco Bell Arena
Boise, ID
Attendance: 8,234
Referees: Chuck Gonzales, Scotty Hermann, Anita Ortega

=== UMKC ===
USF TV

Dec 18
7:00 pm PST

Recap

UMKC Kangaroos 70, San Francisco Dons 62 (OT)
Scoring by half: 29-27, 27-29 Overtime: 14-6
Pts: Eilise O'Connor 30; Rebs: Kim Nezianya 10; Asts: Kelsey Barnwell & Eilise O'Connor 3	Pts: Taylor Proctor 18; Rebs: Taylor Proctor 15; Asts: Aundrea Gordon & Taylor Proctor 3

War Memorial Gymnasium
San Francisco, CA
Attendance: 583
Referees: Melissa Barlow, Richard Waters, L. Renee Robinson

=== Fresno State ===
MW Net

Dec 20
7:00 pm PST

Recap

San Francisco Dons 76, Fresno State Bulldogs 47
Scoring by half: 41-30, 35-17
Pts: Taylor Proctor 19; Rebs: Taylor Proctor 9 Asts: Jamie Katuna 3	Pts: Bree Farley 10; Rebs: Alex Sheedy 5 Asts: Moriah Faulk 3

Save Mart Center
Fresno, CA
Attendance: 2,008
Referees: Melissa Barlow, Benny Luna, Penny Davis

=== Santa Clara ===
Series history: Santa Clara leads 52–35

Dec 30
7:00 pm PST

Recap

San Francisco Dons 72, Santa Clara Broncos 81
Scoring by half: 42-33, 30-48
Pts: Taj Winston 14; Rebs: Taj Winston & Taylor Proctor 6 Asts: Taylor Proctor 4	Pts: Ruta Zurauskyte 21; Rebs: Ruta Zurauskyte 8 Asts: Raquel Avila 5

Leavey Center
Santa Clara, CA
Attendance: N/A
Referees: Cathi Cornell, Crystal Hogan, Teresa Turner

=== Loyola Marymount ===
Series history: Loyola Marymount leads 33–31

LMUSN

Jan 2
7:00 pm PST

Recap

San Francisco Dons 80, Loyola Marymount Lions 76
Scoring by half: 38-36, 42-40
Pts: Taj Winston 19; Rebs: Taylor Proctor 12; Asts: Zhane Dikes 4	Pts: Leslie Lopez-Wood 18; Rebs: MacKenzie Kerins 11; Asts: Hazel Ramirez 6

Gersten Pavilion
Los Angeles, CA
Attendance: 241
Referees: Charles Gonzales, Karen Lasuik, Kenneth Nash

=== Pepperdine ===
Series history: Pepperdine leads 34–33
Broadcaster: Josh Perigo

TV-32

Jan 4
2:05 pm PST

Recap

San Francisco Dons 77, Pepperdine Waves 61
Scoring by half: 42-33, 30-48
Pts: Taylor Proctor 22; Rebs: Taj Winston 10; Asts: Zhane Dikes 5	Pts: Allie Green 13; Rebs: Amanda Lovely 10; Asts: Bria Richardson 6

Firestone Fieldhouse
Malibu, CA
Attendance: 156
Referees: Michelle Russi, Benito Luna, Alecia Murray

=== Pacific ===
Series history: San Francisco leads 15–12

Jan 9
7:00 pm PST

Recap

Pacific Tigers 80, San Francisco Dons 67
Scoring by half: 39-30, 34-35
Pts: Kiki Moore 20; Rebs: Kendall Kenyon & Kiki Moore 11; Asts: Kiki Moore 6	Pts: Taylor Proctor 29; Rebs: Taylor Proctor 10; Asts: Taylor Proctor 2

War Memorial Gymnasium
San Francisco, CA
Attendance: 521
Referees: Anita Ortega, Richard Waters, Steve Belnap

=== Saint Mary's ===
Series history: Saint Mary's leads 34–23

Jan 11
2:00 pm MST

Recap

Saint Mary's Gaels 86, San Francisco Dons 67
Scoring by half: 42-30, 44-37
Pts: Jackie Nared 24; Rebs: Danielle Mauldin 10; Asts: Jackie Nared & Kate Gaze 3	Pts: Taylor Proctor 24; Rebs: Zhane Dikes & Taylor Proctor 8 Asts: Zhane Dikes 5

War Memorial Gymnasium
San Francisco, CA
Attendance: 472
Referees: Cathi Cornell, Robert Scofield, Skelly Wingard

=== Gonzaga ===
Series history: Gonzaga leads 31–24

Jan 17
7:00 pm PST

Recap

Gonzaga Bulldogs 68, San Francisco Dons 40
Scoring by half: 36-19, 32-21
Pts: Haiden Palmer 26; Rebs: Sunny Greinacher 10; Asts: Kiara Kudron 3	Pts: Denae Mary Williams 15; Rebs: Rachel Howard 8 Asts: Aundrea Gordon 4

War Memorial Gymnasium
San Francisco, CA
Attendance: 363
Referees: Shelley Russi, Shelley Nakasone, Cheryll Blue

=== Portland ===
Series history: Portland leads 30–26

Jan 19
2:00 pm PST

Recap

Portland Pilots 82, San Francisco Dons 72
Scoring by half: 32-32, 50-40
Pts: Kari Luttinen 23; Rebs: Amy Pupa 9 Asts: Jasmine Wooton 4	Pts: Taylor Proctor 21; Rebs: Taylor Proctor 11; Asts: Taylor Proctor, Taj Winston, & Alexa Hardick 3

War Memorial Gymnasium
San Francisco, CA
Attendance: 187
Referees: Kyle Bacon, Tiffany Jump, Richard Waters

=== BYU ===
Series history: BYU leads series 8–2
Broadcasters: Spencer Linton, Kristen Kozlowski, and Andy Boyce

BYUtv

Jan 23
7:05 pm PST

Recap

San Francisco Dons 47, BYU Cougars 81
Scoring by half: 21-32, 21-36
Pts: Zhane Dikes 18; Rebs: Taylor Proctor 9 Asts: Aundrea Gordon & Taylor Proctor 2	Pts: Lexi Eaton 23; Rebs: Jennifer Hamson 17; Asts: Kim Beeston 10

Marriott Center
Provo, UT
Attendance: 620
Referees: Melissa Barlow, Anita Ortega, L. Renee Robinson

=== San Diego ===
Series history: San Diego leads 35–24

Jan 25
2:05 pm PST

Recap

San Francisco Dons 58, San Diego Toreros 76
Scoring by half: 27-35, 31-41
Pts: Zhane Dikes 14; Rebs: Taylor Proctor 7 Asts: Taylor Proctor & Zhane Dikes 2	Pts: Malina Hood 20; Rebs: Felicia Wijenberg 9 Asts: Amy Kame 8

Jenny Craig Pavilion
San Diego, CA
Attendance: 445
Referees: Robert Scofield, Gordon Torigoe, Teresa Turner

=== Portland ===
Series history: Portland leads 31–26

Jan 30
7:00 pm PST

Recap

San Francisco Dons 74, Portland Pilots 73
Scoring by half: 24-37, 50-36
Pts: Alexa Hardick 21; Rebs: Taylor Proctor 9 Asts: Taylor Proctor 6	Pts: Cassandra Thompson 23; Rebs: Amy Pupa 10; Asts: Jasmine Wooton 6

Chiles Center
Portland, OR
Attendance: 325
Referees: Wanda Szermeta, Lisa Ulmer, Felicity Willis

=== Gonzaga ===
Series history: Gonzaga leads 32–24

Feb 2
2:00 pm PST

Recap

San Francisco Dons 66, Gonzaga Bulldogs 101
Scoring by half: 46-50, 20-51
Pts: Zhane Dikes 14; Rebs: Paige Spietz 4 Asts: Zhane Dikes 5	Pts: Lindsay Sherbert 23; Rebs: Sunny Greinacher & Lindsay Sherbert 7 Asts: Jazmine Redmon & Danielle Walter 6

McCarthey Athletic Center
Spokane, WA
Attendance: 5,476
Referees: Karen Lasuik, Brian Woods, Skelly Wingard

=== San Diego ===
Series history: San Diego leads 36–24

Feb 6
2:05 pm PST

Recap

San Diego Toreros 74, San Francisco Dons 78
Scoring by half: 32-38, 42-40
Pts: Amy Kame 28; Rebs: Brooke Jelniker 12; Asts: Brooke Jelniker & Amy Kame 3	Pts: Zhane Dikes 28; Rebs: Paige Spietz 8 Asts: Claudia Price 3

War Memorial Gymnasium
San Francisco, CA
Attendance: 271
Referees: Kyle Bacon, Benny Luna, Renee Robinson

=== BYU ===
Series history: BYU leads 9–2
Broadcaster: Joe Castellano

Dons TV

Feb 8
2:00 pm PST

Recap

BYU Cougars 73, San Francisco Dons 66
Scoring by half: 33-33, 40-33
Pts: Jennifer Hamson 25; Rebs: Jennifer Hamson 13; Asts: Kylie Maeda 5	Pts: Paige Spietz 18; Rebs: Paige Spietz 12; Asts: Zhane Dikes, Taj Winston, Alexa Hardick, Taylor Proctor, & Aundrea Gordon 2

War Memorial Gymnasium
San Francisco, CA
Attendance: 346
Referees: Cathi Cornell, Lucy Banuelos, Steve Belnap

=== Santa Clara ===
Series history: Santa Clara leads 53–35

Feb 15
2:00 pm PST

Recap

Santa Clara Dons 74, San Francisco Dons 73
Scoring by half: 33-36, 41-37
Pts: Nici Gilday 21; Rebs: Marie Bertholdt 8 Asts: Montana Walters & Nici Gilday 3	Pts: Taylor Proctor 27; Rebs: Paige Spietz 8 Asts: Zhane Dikes & Taylor Proctor 3

War Memorial Gymnasium
San Francisco, CA
Attendance: 604
Referees: Richard Waters, Paul Patterson, Gordon Torigoe

=== Saint Mary's ===
Series history: Saint Mary's leads 35–23

Feb 20
6:00 pm MST

Recap

San Francisco Dons 64, Saint Mary's Gaels 83
Scoring by half: 43-45, 21-38
Pts: Zhane Dikes 17; Rebs: Zhane Dikes 7 Asts: Rachel Howard 4	Pts: Jackie Nared 23; Rebs: Danielle Mauldin 12; Asts: Jackie Nared 5

McKeon Pavilion
Moraga, CA
Attendance: 240
Referees: Michol Murray, Kyle Bacon, Julie Vanni

=== Pacific ===
Series history: San Francisco leads 15–13
Broadcaster: Don Gubbins

TheW.tv

Feb 22
2:06 pm PST

Recap

San Francisco Dons 65, Pacific Tigers 83
Scoring by half: 30-42, 35-41
Pts: Taj Winston 17; Rebs: Taylor Proctor 10; Asts: Rachel Howard 4	Pts: Kiki Moore 21; Rebs: Kendall Kenyon 12; Asts: Madison Parrish 5

Alex G. Spanos Center
Stockton, CA
Attendance: 605
Referees: Penny Davis, Alejandro Moreno, Rigo Vasquez

=== Pepperdine ===
Series history: Series even 34-34

Feb 27
7:00 pm PST

Recap

Pepperdine Waves 61, San Francisco Dons 75
Scoring by half: 32-34, 29-41
Pts: Ea Shoushtari 13; Rebs: Keitra Wallace 8 Asts: Keitra Wallace 3	Pts: Zhane Dikes 15; Rebs: Taylor Proctor 11; Asts: Zhane Dikes, Rachel Howard, & Aundrea Gordon 2

War Memorial Gymnasium
San Francisco, CA
Attendance: 413
Referees: Anita Ortega, Bethany Graves, Brian Woods

== Rankings ==
+ Regular season polls	Poll	Pre- season	Week 1	Week 2	Week 3	Week 4	Week 5	Week 6	Week 7	Week 8	Week 9	Week 10	Week 11	Week 12	Week 13	Week 14	Week 15	Week 16	Week 17	Week 18	Final
AP																					
Coaches																					

Legend
	Increase in ranking
	Decrease in ranking
	No change
(RV)	Received votes
(NR)	Not ranked

== See also ==
- San Francisco Dons women's basketball
