= 2013–14 San Diego Toreros women's basketball team =

Intercollegiate basketball season

2013–14 San Diego Toreros women's basketball

WNIT, Third Round
- Conference: West Coast Conference
- Record: 24–9 (11–7 WCC)
- Head coach: Cindy Fisher (9th season)
- Assistant coaches: Mary Ann Falcosky; Niecee Nelson; Ashley Ford
- Home arena: Jenny Craig Pavilion

2013–14 West Coast Conference women's basketball standings
	Conf.				Overall
Team	W		L	PCT	W		L	PCT
No. 18 Gonzaga†	16	–	2	.889	29	–	5	.853
BYU	14	–	4	.778	28	–	7	.800
Pacific	12	–	6	.667	18	–	13	.581
Saint Mary's	11	–	7	.611	23	–	10	.697
San Diego	11	–	7	.611	24	–	9	.727
Portland	7	–	11	.389	14	–	16	.467
Santa Clara	6	–	12	.333	10	–	20	.333
San Francisco	6	–	12	.333	12	–	19	.387
Loyola Marymount	6	–	12	.333	9	–	21	.300
Pepperdine	1	–	17	.056	6	–	25	.194
† 2014 WCC tournament winner As of March 29, 2014; Rankings from AP Poll

The 2013–14 San Diego Toreros women's basketball team represented the University of San Diego in the 2013–14 college basketball season. The Toreros, members of the West Coast Conference, were led by head coach Cindy Fisher, in her 9th season at the school. The Toreros played their home games at the Jenny Craig Pavilion on the university campus in San Diego, California. The Toreros would finish tied for fourth in the conference and participate in the WNIT. The Toreros ended the season 24–9.

== Roster ==
2013–14 San Diego Toreros women's basketball team
Players
Coaches

Pos.	#	Name	Height	Year	Previous school	Hometown
G	1	Brooke Jelniker	6 ft 0 in (1.83 m)	RS Jr	ThunderRidge	Highlands Ranch, CO
F	2	Malina Hood	5 ft 10 in (1.78 m)	So	La Jolla Country Day	San Diego, CA
G	3	Sophie Ederaine	5 ft 9 in (1.75 m)	Jr	Canyon Springs	Moreno Valley, CA
G	10	Amy Kame	6 ft 0 in (1.83 m)	Sr	Central	Grand Junction, CO
F	11	Katelyn McDaniel (injured)	6 ft 1 in (1.85 m)	Jr	Highlands Ranch	Littleton, CO
F	12	Sophia Ederaine	6 ft 3 in (1.91 m)	Jr	Canyon Springs	Moreno Valley, CA
G	13	Felicia Wijinberg	6 ft 2 in (1.88 m)	RS Sr	St. Mary's Secondary	Maple Ridge, British Columbia
F	22	Maya Hood (redshirt)	5 ft 10 in (1.78 m)	So	La Jolla Country Day	San Diego, CA
G	33	Alysse Barlow	5 ft 4 in (1.63 m)	Sr	Hutchinson	Arlington, TX
F	45	Kameron Knutson	6 ft 3 in (1.91 m)	Sr	Dobson	Mesa, AZ
G	32	Cori Woodward	5 ft 6 in (1.68 m)	Fr	Prairie	Vancouver, WA
F	21	Edi Utibe	6 ft 2 in (1.88 m)	Fr	Charlotte Amalie	Virgin Islands
G	25	Katherine Hamilton	5 ft 8 in (1.73 m)	Fr	Dobson	Chandler, AZ
F	55	Alexandria Young	6 ft 0 in (1.83 m)	Fr	Mater Dei	San Diego, CA

Head coach

- Cindy Fisher (Eastern Wyoming College)

Assistant coach(es)

- Mary Ann Falcosky (Northern Arizona)
- Niecee Nelson (Concordia)
- Ashley Ford (Nebraska)

Legend

- (C) Team captain
- (S) Suspended
- (I) Ineligible
- (W) Walk-on
- Injured
- Current redshirt

Roster

== Schedule ==
Date time, TV	Rank^{#}	Opponent^{#}	Result	Record	Site city, state
Non-conference Regular Season
11/09/2013*; 2:00 pm, Watch Big Sky		at Northern Colorado	W 69–56	1–0	Butler–Hancock Sports Pavilion; Greeley, CO
11/13/2013*; 5:15 pm, USD TV		Arizona State	W 61–53	2–0	Jenny Craig Pavilion; San Diego, CA
11/18/2013*; 7:00 pm, MW Net		at San Diego State	W 48–45	3–0	Viejas Arena; San Diego, CA
11/23/2013*; 3:00 pm, MW Net		at San Jose State	W 88–60	4–0	San Jose State Event Center; San Jose, CA
11/26/2013*; 6:00 pm, USD TV		Idaho	W 74–64	5–0	Jenny Craig Pavilion; San Diego, CA
11/29/2013*; 5:00 pm, USD TV		Hope International	W 86–65	6–0	Jenny Craig Pavilion; San Diego, CA
12/01/2013*; 1:00 pm, USD TV		Weber State	W 75–55	7–0	Jenny Craig Pavilion; San Diego, CA
12/04/2013*; 7:00 pm, BigWest.TV		at Cal State Fullerton	W 65–42	8–0	Titan Gym; Fullerton, CA
12/08/2013*; 2:00 pm, USD TV		Seattle	W 79–55	9–0	Jenny Craig Pavilion; San Diego, CA
12/13/2013*; 7:00 pm, BigWest.TV		at Long Beach State	W 68–51	10–0	Walter Pyramid; Long Beach, CA
12/20/2013*; 6:00 pm, USD TV		UC Irvine	W 79–55	11–0	Jenny Craig Pavilion; San Diego, CA
WCC Regular Season
12/28/2013*; 2:00 pm, USD TV		Pepperdine	W 71–43	12–0 (1–0)	Jenny Craig Pavilion; San Diego, CA
12/30/2013; 6:00 pm, USD TV		Loyola Marymount	W 86–63	13–0 (2–0)	Jenny Craig Pavilion; San Diego, CA
01/02/2014; 6:00 pm, USD TV		Saint Mary's	W 80–70	14–0 (3–0)	Jenny Craig Pavilion; San Diego, CA
01/04/2014; 2:00 pm, USD TV		Pacific	W 75–70 ^{OT}	15–0 (4–0)	Jenny Craig Pavilion; San Diego, CA
01/08/2014; 7:00 pm, Pilots TV	No. 24	at Portland	L 51–72	15–1 (4–1)	Chiles Center; Portland, OR
01/11/2014; 2:00 pm, Zags Sports Channel	No. 24	at Gonzaga	L 50–79	15–2 (4–2)	McCarthey Athletic Center; Spokane, WA
01/18/2014; 2:00 pm, TheW.tv		BYU	W 60–45	16–2 (5–2)	Jenny Craig Pavilion; San Diego, CA
01/23/2014; 6:00 pm, USD TV		Santa Clara	W 79–50	17–2 (6–2)	Jenny Craig Pavilion; San Diego, CA
01/25/2014; 2:00 pm, USD TV		San Francisco	W 76–58	18–2 (7–2)	Jenny Craig Pavilion; San Diego, CA
01/30/2014; 7:00 pm, TheW.tv		at Pacific	L 70–80	18–3 (7–3)	Alex G. Spanos Center; Stockton, CA
02/01/2014; 1:00 pm, Gaels Insider		at Saint Mary's	L 68–81	18–4 (7–4)	McKeon Pavilion; Moraga, CA
02/06/2014; 7:00 pm, USF TV		at San Francisco	L 74–78	18–5 (7–5)	War Memorial Gymnasium; San Francisco, CA
02/08/2013; 2:00 pm, Santa Clara TV		at Santa Clara	W 72–44	19–5 (8–5)	Leavey Center; Santa Clara, CA
02/13/2014; 6:00 pm, TheW.tv		No. 20 Gonzaga	L 48–66	19–6 (8–6)	Jenny Craig Pavilion; San Diego, CA
02/15/2014; 2:00 pm, USD TV		Portland	W 59–52	20–6 (9–6)	Jenny Craig Pavilion; San Diego, CA
02/19/2014; 7:00 pm, LMUSN		at Loyola Marymount	W 87–74	21–6 (10–6)	Gersten Pavilion; Los Angeles, CA
02/22/2014; 2:00 pm, TV-32		at Pepperdine	W 73–46	22–6 (11–6)	Firestone Fieldhouse; Malibu, CA
03/01/2014; 12:00 pm, BYUtv		at BYU	L 58–71	22–7 (11–7)	Marriott Center; Provo, UT
2014 West Coast Conference women's basketball tournament
03/07/2014; 8:30 pm, BYUtv		vs. Saint Mary's; Quarterfinal	L 58–60	22–8	Orleans Arena; Las Vegas, NV
2014 WNIT
03/20/2014; 6:00 pm		Cal Poly; 1st Round	W 82–59	23–8	Jenny Craig Pavilion; San Diego, CA
03/24/2014; 6:00 pm		at Montana; 2nd Round	W 60–57	24–8	Dahlberg Arena; Missoula, MT
03/26/2014; 7:00 pm		at Washington; 3rd Round	L 55–62	24–9	Hec Edmundson Pavilion; Seattle, WA
*Non-conference game. ^{#}Rankings from AP Poll. (#) Tournament seedings in parentheses. All times are in Pacific Time.

== Game summaries ==
=== Northern Colorado ===
Nov 9
2:00 pm MST

Recap

San Diego Toreros 69, Northern Colorado Bears 56
Scoring by half: 30–34, 39–22
Pts: Amy Kame 22; Rebs: Sophie Ederaine 5 Asts: Amy Kame 4	Pts: Jamie Derrieux 15; Rebs: Amy Kinder 7 Asts: Jamie Derrieux 4

Butler–Hancock Sports Pavilion
Greeley, CO
Attendance: 663
Referees: Robert Scofield, Jeneane Pence, Janetta Graham

=== Arizona State ===
Nov 13
5:15 pm PST

Recap

Arizona State Sun Devils 53, San Diego Toreros 61
Scoring by half: 27–30, 26–31
Pts: Deja Mann 12; Rebs: Kelsey Moos & Sophie Brunner 7 Asts: Deja Mann, Promise Amukamara, Adrianne Promise, & Elisha Davis 1	Pts: Felicia Wijenberg 15; Rebs: Sophia Ederaine & Felicia Wijenberg 8 Asts: Brooke Jelniker 3

Jenny Craig Pavilion
San Diego, CA
Attendance: 337
Referees: Charles Gonzales, Kenneth Nash, Cheryl Blue

=== San Diego State ===
MW Net

Nov 18
6:00 pm PST

Recap

San Diego Toreros 48, San Diego State Aztecs 45
Scoring by half: 22–21, 26–24
Pts: Amy Kame 16; Rebs: Felicia Wijenberg 10; Asts: Brooke Jelniker 4	Pts: Erimma Amarikwa 13; Rebs: Khristina Hunter, Deajanae Scurry & Erimma Amarikwa 6 Asts: Ariell Bostick 4

Viejas Arena
San Diego, CA
Attendance: 603
Referees: Marianne Karp, Brenda Pantoja, Jack Jones

=== San Jose State ===
MW Net

Nov 23
3:00 pm PST

Recap

San Diego Toreros 88, San Jose State Spartans 60
Scoring by half: 38–22, 50–38
Pts: Felicia Wijenberg 18; Rebs: Katelyn McDaniel 12; Asts: Brooke Jelniker 5	Pts: Jasmine Smith 13; Rebs: Jasmine Smith 10; Asts: Britta Hall 5

San Jose State Event Center
San Jose, CA
Attendance: 1,433
Referees: Penny Davis, Esther Hsu, Shelley Rusi

=== Idaho ===
USD TV

Nov 26
6:05 pm PST

Recap

Idaho Vandals 64, San Diego Toreros 74
Scoring by half: 31–28, 33–46
Pts: Stacey Barr 14; Rebs: Stacey Barr 11; Asts: Stacey Barr & Connie Ballestero 3	Pts: Amy Kame & Sophia Ederaine 14; Rebs: Amy Kame & Felicia Wijenberg 9 Asts: Amy Kame 7

Jenny Craig Pavilion
San Diego, CA
Attendance: 312
Referees: Marianne Karp, Cheryl Flores, Tiffany Jump

=== Hope International ===
USD TV

Nov 29
5:05 pm PST

Recap

Hope International Royals 65, San Diego Toreros 86
Scoring by half: 36–54, 29–32
Pts: Andrina Rendon 29; Rebs: Shawna Staves 6 Asts: Andrina Rendon & Krystyn Jacobs 4	Pts: Katelyn McDaniel 18; Rebs: Katelyn McDaniel 11; Asts: Amy Kame 4

Jenny Craig Pavilion
San Diego, CA
Attendance: 381
Referees: Karen Lusik, Alex Carroll, Richard Waters

=== Weber State ===
USD TV

Dec 1
1:05 pm PST

Recap

Weber State Wildcats 55, San Diego Toreros 75
Scoring by half: 25–38, 30–37
Pts: Regina Okoye 21; Rebs: Jalen Carpenter & Kalie Matthews 4 Asts: Desiree Ramos & Regina Okoye 2	Pts: Katelyn McDaniel 22; Rebs: Katelyn McDaniel 10; Asts: Brooke Jelniker & Amy Kame 3

Jenny Craig Pavilion
San Diego, CA
Attendance: 312
Referees: Kyle Bacon, Robert Scofield, Lisa Ulmer

=== Cal State Fullerton ===
BigWest.tv

Dec 4
7:00 pm PST

Recap

San Diego Toreros 65, Cal State Fullerton Titans 42
Scoring by half: 42–21, 23–21
Pts: Malina Hood 19; Rebs: Brooke Jelniker 7 Asts: Alysse Barlow 5	Pts: Kathlenn Iwuoha 11; Rebs: Samantha Logan 8 Asts: Hailey King 3

Titan Gym
Fullerton, CA
Attendance: 140
Referees: Richard Waters, Norma Leibfreid, Adria Molina

=== Seattle ===
USD TV

Dec 8
2:05 pm PST

Recap

Seattle Redhawks 55, San Diego Toreros 79
Scoring by half: 26–42, 29–37
Pts: Ashley Ward 17; Rebs: Ashley Ward 6 Asts: Alexis Montgomery & Kacie Sowell 2	Pts: Amy Kame 18; Rebs: Katelyn McDaniel 12; Asts: Alysse Barlow 5

Jenny Craig Pavilion
San Diego, CA
Attendance: 144
Referees: Not listed

=== Long Beach State ===
BigWest.tv

Dec 13
7:00 pm PST

Recap

San Diego Toreros 68, Long Beach State 49ers 51
Scoring by half: 31–22, 37–29
Pts: Amy Kame 16; Rebs: Katelyn McDaniel 18; Asts: Amy Kame 6	Pts: Raven Benton 18; Rebs: Anna Kim 5 Asts: Hallie Meneses 5

Walter Pyramid
Long Beach, CA
Attendance: 669
Referees: Andy Wolf, Brandon Self, A.V. Cervantes

=== UC Irvine ===
Series History: San Diego leads 14–12

USD TV

Dec 20
6:05 pm PST

Recap

UC Irvine Anteaters 51, San Diego Toreros 79
Scoring by half: 26–35, 29–44
Pts: Jennifer Tsurumoto 18; Rebs: Lauren Spinazze & Jasmine Bernard 3 Asts: Kelly Meggs 2	Pts: Malina Hood 23; Rebs: Felicia Wijenberg 11; Asts: Alysse Barlow 7

Jenny Craig Pavilion
San Diego, CA
Attendance: 302
Referees: Brian Woods, Cheryl Flores, Cheryll Blue

=== Pepperdine ===
Series History: Pepperdine leads 39–27

USD TV

Dec 28
2:05 pm PST

Recap

Pepperdine Waves 43, San Diego Toreros 71
Scoring by half: 20–33, 23–38
Pts: Keitra Wallace 19; Rebs: Allie Green 8 Asts: Jaya Schultz, Keitra Wallace, & Amanda Lovely 1	Pts: Felicia Wijenberg 24; Rebs: Felicia Wijenberg 11; Asts: Malina Hood 3

Jenny Craig Pavilion
San Diego, CA
Attendance: 513
Referees: Melissa Barlow, Gordon Torigoe, L. Renee Robinson

=== Loyola Marymount ===
Series History: San Diego leads 38–27

USD TV

Dec 30
6:05 pm PST

Recap

Loyola Marymount Lions 63, San Diego Toreros 86
Scoring by half: 29–45, 34–41
Pts: Hazel Ramirez 24; Rebs: Mackenzie Keirns 8 Asts: Hazel Ramirez, Sophie Taylor, & Brianna Kennedy 1	Pts: Malina Hood 27; Rebs: Sophia Ederaine 12; Asts: Felicia Wijenberg 5

Jenny Craig Pavilion
San Diego, CA
Attendance: 360
Referees: Darren Krzesnik, Alecia Murray, Lisa Ulmer

=== Saint Mary's ===
Series History: Saint Mary's leads 37–26

USD TV

Jan 2
6:05 pm PST

Recap

Saint Mary's Gaels 70, San Diego Toreros 80
Scoring by half: 33–40, 37–40
Pts: Jackie Nared 16; Rebs: Danielle Mauldin 12; Asts: Kate Gaze 2	Pts: Amy Kame 23; Rebs: Amy Kame 8 Asts: Amy Kame 7

Jenny Craig Pavilion
San Diego, CA
Attendance: 478
Referees: Kyle Bacon, Wanda Szermeta, Cheryl Flores

=== Pacific ===
Series History: San Diego leads 10–2

USD TV

Jan 4
2:05 pm PST

Recap

Pacific Tigers 70, San Diego Toreros 75 (OT)
Scoring by half: 24–39, 40–25 Overtime: 6–11
Pts: Kendall Kenyon 19; Rebs: Kendall Kenyon 10; Asts: Kiki Moore 4	Pts: Amy Kame 28; Rebs: Amy Kame & Felicia Wijenberg 11; Asts: Amy Kame & Katherine Hamilton 2

Jenny Craig Pavilion
San Diego, CA
Attendance: 521
Referees: Cathi Cornell, Bethany Graves, Tiffany Bird

=== Portland ===
Series History: San Diego leads 32–31

Pilots TV

Jan 8
7:00 pm PST

Recap

San Diego Toreros 51, Portland Pilots 72
Scoring by half: 24–31, 27–41
Pts: Felicia Wijenberg 28; Rebs: Sophia Ederaine 13; Asts: Amy Kame 6	Pts: Cassandra Brown 18; Rebs: Amy Pupa 11; Asts: Jasmine Wooton 6

Chiles Center
Portland, OR
Attendance: 262
Referees: Charles Gonzales, Alejandro Moreno, Julie Vanni

=== Gonzaga ===
Series History: Gonzaga leads 45–20

Jan 11
2:00 pm PST

Recap

San Diego Toreros 50, Gonzaga Bulldogs 79
Scoring by half: 27–50, 23–29
Pts: Malina Hood 13; Rebs: Amy Kame, Felicia Wijenberg, & Kameron Knutson 7 Asts: Amy Kame 4	Pts: Haiden Palmer 19; Rebs: Kiara Kudron 8 Asts: Danielle Walter 7

McCarthey Athletic Center
Spokane, WA
Attendance: 5,536
Referees: Anita Ortega, Teresa Turner, Felecity Willis

=== BYU ===
Series History: BYU leads 6–0
Broadcasters: Justin Alderson and Tracy Warren

TheW.tv

Jan 18
7:00 pm PST

Recap

BYU Cougars 45, San Diego Toreros 60
Scoring by half: 28–26, 17–34
Pts: Lexi Eaton 16; Rebs: Jennifer Hamson 17; Asts: Lexi Eaton 2	Pts: Amy Kame 23; Rebs: Amy Kame 8 Asts: Brooke Jelniker, Amy Kame, & Sophia Ederaine 2

Jenny Craig Pavilion
San Diego, CA
Attendance: 369
Referees: Richard Waters, Darren Krzesnik, Janetta Graham

=== Santa Clara ===
Series History: Santa Clara leads 32–31

Jan 23
6:00 pm PST

Recap

Santa Clara Broncos 55, San Diego Toreros 79
Scoring by half: 29–39, 26–40
Pts: Jo Paine 13; Rebs: Ruta Zurauskyte 6 Asts: Raquel Avila 5	Pts: Sophia Ederaine 21; Rebs: Felicia Wijenberg 9 Asts: Amy Kame, Felicia Wijenberg, & Katherine Hamilton 3

Jenny Craig Pavilion
San Diego, CA
Attendance: 463
Referees: Kyle Bacon, Cathi Cornell, Alecia Murray

=== San Francisco ===
Series History: San Diego leads 35–24

Jan 25
2:05 pm PST

Recap

San Francisco Dons 58, San Diego Toreros 76
Scoring by half: 27–35, 31–41
Pts: Zhane Dikes 14; Rebs: Taylor Proctor 7 Asts: Taylor Proctor & Zhane Dikes 2	Pts: Malina Hood 20; Rebs: Felicia Wijenberg 9 Asts: Amy Kame 8

Jenny Craig Pavilion
San Diego, CA
Attendance: 445
Referees: Robert Scofield, Gordon Torigoe, Teresa Turner

=== Pacific ===
Series History: San Diego leads 11–2
Broadcasters: Don Gubbins and Alex Sanchez

TheW.tv

Jan 30
7:05 pm PST

Recap

San Diego Toreros 70, Pacific Tigers 80
Scoring by half: 45–37, 25–43
Pts: Sophia Ederaine 17; Rebs: Sophia Ederaine 15; Asts: Amy Kame 5	Pts: Kiki Moore 23; Rebs: Kendall Kenyon 13; Asts: Kiki Moore 5

Alex G. Spanos Center
Stockton, CA
Attendance: 394
Referees: Melissa Barlow, Karen Lasuik, Cheryl Flores

=== Saint Mary's ===
Series History: Saint Mary's leads 37–27

Feb 1
1:00 pm PST

Recap

San Diego Toreros 68, Saint Mary's Gaels 71
Scoring by half: 37–34, 31–37
Pts: Amy Kame 28; Rebs: Katherine Hamilton 12; Asts: Malina Hood 3	Pts: Jackie Nared 25; Rebs: Danielle Mauldin 13; Asts: Kate Gaze 8

McKeon Pavilion
Moraga, CA
Attendance: 283
Referees: Shelly Russi, Crystal Hogan, Lisa Ulmer

=== San Francisco ===
Series History: San Diego leads 36–24

Feb 6
2:05 pm PST

Recap

San Diego Toreros 74, San Francisco Dons 78
Scoring by half: 32–38, 42–40
Pts: Amy Kame 28; Rebs: Brooke Jelniker 12; Asts: Brooke Jelniker & Amy Kame 3	Pts: Zhane Dikes 28; Rebs: Paige Spietz 8 Asts: Claudia Price 3

War Memorial Gymnasium
San Francisco, CA
Attendance: 271
Referees: Kyle Bacon, Benny Luna, Renee Robinson

=== Santa Clara ===
Series History: Series even 32–32

Feb 8
2:00 pm PST

Recap

San Diego Toreros 72, Santa Clara Broncos 44
Scoring by half: 28–26, 44–18
Pts: Amy Kame 19; Rebs: Felicia Wijenberg 9 Asts: Kameron Knutson 3	Pts: Nici Gilday 22; Rebs: Marie Bertholdt 5 Asts: Montana Walters 3

Leavey Center
Santa Clara, CA
Attendance: 564
Referees: Anita Ortega, Alejandro Moreno, Felecity Willis

=== Gonzaga ===
Series History: Gonzaga leads 46–20
Broadcasters: George Devine and Mary Hile-Nepfel

TheW.tv

Feb 13
6:00 pm PST

Recap

Gonzaga Bulldogs 66, San Diego Toreros 48
Scoring by half: 36–22, 30–26
Pts: Haiden Palmer 16; Rebs: Haiden Palmer 8 Asts: Jazmine Redmon 5	Pts: Sophia Ederaine 21; Rebs: Sophia Ederaine 9 Asts: Sophia Ederaine 2

Jenny Craig Pavilion
San Diego, CA
Attendance: 1,408
Referees: Robert Scofield, Alex Carroll, Tiffany Bird

=== Portland ===
Series History: Series even 32–32

Feb 15
2:08 pm PST

Recap

Portland Pilots 52, San Diego Toreros 59
Scoring by half: 21–30, 31–29
Pts: Cassandra Brown & Amy Pupa 17; Rebs: Amy Pupa 7 Asts: Jasmine Wooton 4	Pts: Amy Kame 22; Rebs: Amy Kame 9 Asts: Amy Kame 7

Jenny Craig Pavilion
San Diego, CA
Attendance: 1,236
Referees: Rick Showers, Tiffany Jump, Benny Luna

=== Loyola Marymount ===
Series History: San Diego leads 39–27

LMUSN

Feb 19
6:05 pm PST

Recap

San Diego Toreros 87, Loyola Marymount Lions 74
Scoring by half: 40–36, 47–38
Pts: Amy Kame 31; Rebs: Kameron Knutson 12; Asts: Amy Kame 6	Pts: Deanna Johnson 26; Rebs: Mackenzie Kerins 11; Asts: Hazel Ramirez 10

Gersten Pavilion
Los Angeles, CA
Attendance: 367
Referees: Michol Murray, Wanda Szeremeta, Rigoberto Vasquez

=== Pepperdine ===
Series History: Pepperdine leads 39–28
Broadcaster: Josh Perigo

TV-32

Feb 22
2:05 pm PST

Recap

San Diego Toreros 73, Pepperdine Waves 46
Scoring by half: 40–26, 33–20
Pts: Malina Hood 23; Rebs: Kameron Knutson 9 Asts: Amy Kame 6	Pts: Keitra Wallace 14; Rebs: Ea Shoushtari & Keitra Wallace 5 Asts: Ea Shoushtari 3

Firestone Fieldhouse
Malibu, CA
Attendance: 223
Referees: Robert Scofield, Paul Patterson, Lisa Ulmer

=== BYU ===
Series History: BYU leads 6–1
Broadcasters: Spencer Linton and Kristen Kozlowski

BYUtv

Mar 1
1:05 pm MST

Recap

San Diego Toreros 58, BYU Cougars 71
Scoring by half: 22–39, 36–32
Pts: Amy Kame 16; Rebs: Sophia Ederaine 7 Asts: Alysse Barlow 5	Pts: Jennifer Hamson 21; Rebs: Jennifer Hamson 9 Asts: Kim Beeston 5

Marriott Center
Provo, UT
Attendance: 1,120
Referees: Rigo Vasquez, Bart Baldwin, Cheryll Blue

=== WCC Quarterfinal: Saint Mary's ===
Series History: Saint Mary's leads 38–27
Broadcasters: Spencer Linton and Kristen Kozlowski

BYUtv

Mar 7
PST

vs. Saint Mary's Gaels

Orleans Arena
Paradise, NV

== Rankings ==
Regular season polls
Poll	Pre- Season	Week 1	Week 2	Week 3	Week 4	Week 5	Week 6	Week 7	Week 8	Week 9	Week 10	Week 11	Week 12	Week 13	Week 14	Week 15	Week 16	Week 17	Week 18	Final
AP	NR																			
Coaches	NR																			

Legend
	Increase in ranking
	Decrease in ranking
	No change
(RV)	Received votes
(NR)	Not ranked
