= 2013–14 West Coast Conference women's basketball season =

- League: NCAA Division I
- Sport: Women's basketball
- Teams: 10
- TV partner(s): National: ESPNU, BYUtv, TheW.tv; Regional: SWX, TV-32 Malibu

Regular season
- Season champions: Gonzaga
- Runners-up: BYU
- Season MVP: Jennifer Hamson, BYU

Tournament
- Champions: Gonzaga
- Runners-up: BYU
- Finals MVP: Sunny Greinacher, Gonzaga

Basketball seasons
- ← 12–13 14–15 →

2013–14 West Coast Conference women's basketball standings
	Conf.				Overall
Team	W		L	PCT	W		L	PCT
No. 18 Gonzaga†	16	–	2	.889	29	–	5	.853
BYU	14	–	4	.778	28	–	7	.800
Pacific	12	–	6	.667	18	–	13	.581
Saint Mary's	11	–	7	.611	23	–	10	.697
San Diego	11	–	7	.611	24	–	9	.727
Portland	7	–	11	.389	14	–	16	.467
Santa Clara	6	–	12	.333	10	–	20	.333
San Francisco	6	–	12	.333	12	–	19	.387
Loyola Marymount	6	–	12	.333	9	–	21	.300
Pepperdine	1	–	17	.056	6	–	25	.194
† 2014 WCC tournament winner As of March 29, 2014; Rankings from AP Poll

The 2013–14 West Coast Conference women's basketball season began with practices in October 2013 and ended with the 2014 West Coast Conference women's basketball tournament at the Orleans Arena March 6–11, 2014 in Las Vegas. The regular season began in November, with the conference schedule starting at the end of December.

This was the 29th season for WCC women's basketball, which began in the 1985–86 season when the league was known as the West Coast Athletic Conference (WCAC). It was also the 25th season under the West Coast Conference name (the conference began as the California Basketball Association in 1952, became the WCAC in 1956, and dropped the word "Athletic" in 1989). The conference went through significant changes this season, adding a new member for the second time in three seasons. Conference charter member Pacific, like all other WCC members founded as a faith-based institution, but now the WCC's only officially nonsectarian school, rejoined from the Big West after a 42-year absence.

== Pre-season ==
- Pre-season media day took place on Thursday, October 24 at the Time Warner Cable SportsNet and Time Warner Cable Deportes Studios. Video interviews were hosted on the WCC's streaming video outlet, TheW.tv, beginning at 11:30 AM PDT. Jeff Lampe of WCC Live interviewed each coach and got a preview of their respective season. The regional television schedule announcement, the Pre-season Conference team, and the pre-season coaches rankings were some of the additional events that took place.

=== 2013–14 West Coast Women's Basketball Media Poll ===
Rank, School (first-place votes), Points
1. Gonzaga (9), 81
2. San Diego (1), 69
3. St. Mary's, 63
4. BYU, 62
5. Pacific, 46
6. Loyola Marymount, 38
7t. San Francisco, 27
7t. Santa Clara, 27
7t. Portland, 27
10. Pepperdine, 10

=== 2013–14 West Coast Women's Preseason All-West Conference Team ===
Player, School, Yr., Pos.
Zhane Dikes, San Francisco, So., G
Sunny Greinacher, Gonzaga, Jr., F
Jennifer Hamson, BYU, Sr., C
Maya Hood, San Diego, So., F
Amy Kame, San Diego, Sr., G
Danielle Mauldin, Saint Mary's, Sr., F
Jackie Nared, Saint Mary's, Sr., G
Haiden Palmer, Gonzaga, Sr., G
Hazel Ramirez, Loyola Marymount, Sr., G
Jazmine Redmon, Gonzaga, Sr., G

== Rankings ==
The AP Poll does not do a post-season rankings. As a result, their last rankings are Week 19. The Coaches Poll does a post-season poll and the end of the NCAA Tournament.

Legend
	Improvement in ranking
	Drop in ranking
RV	Received votes but were not ranked in Top 25 of poll

		Pre/ Wk 1	Wk 2	Wk 3	Wk 4	Wk 5	Wk 6	Wk 7	Wk 8	Wk 9	Wk 10	Wk 11	Wk 12	Wk 13	Wk 14	Wk 15	Wk 16	Wk 17	Wk 18	Wk 19	Post
BYU	AP				RV	RV	RV										RV	RV	RV	RV	
BYU	C	RV	RV	RV	RV	RV	RV	RV	RV	RV	RV	RV	RV	RV		RV	RV	RV	RV	RV	18
Gonzaga	AP	25	25	24	24	24	23	25	24	RV	RV	RV	25	22	20	20	24	22	21	18	
Gonzaga	C	RV	RV	25	24	24	22	22	21	RV	RV	23	22	17	15	15	20	20	19	16	22
Loyola Marymount	AP																				
Loyola Marymount	C																				
Pacific	AP																				
Pacific	C																				
Pepperdine	AP																				
Pepperdine	C																				
Portland	AP																				
Portland	C																				
Saint Mary's	AP			RV											RV						
Saint Mary's	C	RV	RV	RV	RV	RV															
San Diego	AP					RV	RV	RV	RV	RV	24	RV	RV	RV							
San Diego	C	RV				RV	RV	RV	RV	RV	24	RV	RV	RV							
San Francisco	AP																				
San Francisco	C																				
Santa Clara	AP																				
Santa Clara	C																				

== Non-Conference games ==
- Saint Mary's defeated Pac-12 member Washington 91–81 on November 8, 2013
- San Diego defeated Pac-12 member Arizona State 61–53 on November 13, 2013
- Gonzaga went on the road and nearly defeated #11 Oklahoma in the semifinals of the Women's Preseason NIT. In the end the Sooners snuck away with an 82–78 victory, but the Zags performance brought them more notice from the voters, moving them into the Top 25 in the Coaches Poll and moving them up one spot to #24 in the AP Poll.
- BYU defeated ACC member Boston College 70–69 in OT on November 16, 2013

== Conference games ==
=== Composite Matrix ===
This table summarizes the head-to-head results between teams in conference play. (x) indicates games remaining this season.

	BYU	Gonzaga	LMU	Pacific	Pepperdine	Portland	Saint Mary's	San Diego	San Francisco	Santa Clara
vs. Brigham Young	-	1-1	0–2	1–1	0–2	0–2	1–1	1–1	0-2	0-2
vs. Gonzaga	1–1	–	0–2	0–2	0–2	0–2	1–1	0–2	0–2	0-2
vs. Loyola Marymount	2–0	2–0	–	1–1	0–2	0–2	1–1	2–0	2–0	1-1
vs. Pacific	1–1	2–0	1–1	-	0–2	1–1	0–2	1–1	0–2	0-2
vs. Pepperdine	2–0	2–0	2–0	2–0	-	2–0	2–0	2–0	2–0	1-1
vs. Portland	2–0	2–0	1–1	1–1	0–2	-	2–0	1–1	1–1	1-1
vs. Saint Mary's	1–1	1–1	1–1	2–0	0–2	0–2	-	1–1	0–2	1-1
vs. San Diego	1–1	2–0	0–2	1–1	0–2	1–1	1–1	-	1–1	0-2
vs. San Francisco	2–0	2–0	0–2	2–0	0–2	1–1	2–0	1–1	-	2-0
vs. Santa Clara	2–0	2–0	1–1	2–0	1–1	1–1	1–1	2–0	0-2	-
Total	14–4	16–2	6–12	12–6	1–17	7–11	11–7	11–7	6–12	6-12

== Conference tournament ==
- March 6–11, 2014– West Coast Conference Basketball Tournament, Orleans Arena, Las Vegas, NV.

First round Thursday, March 6
8	San Francisco	63
9	Loyola Marymount	62
7	Santa Clara	74
10	Pepperdine	80

Quarterfinals; Friday, March 7
1	Gonzaga	81
8	San Francisco	68
4	Saint Mary's	60
5	San Diego	58
3	Pacific	84
6	Portland	72
2	BYU	77
10	Pepperdine	51

Semifinals; Monday, March 10
1	Gonzaga	68
4	Saint Mary's	60
3	Pacific	64
2	BYU	77

Championship; Tuesday, March 11
1	Gonzaga	71
2	BYU	57

== Head coaches ==
Jeff Judkins, BYU
Kelly Graves, Gonzaga
Charity Elliott, Loyola Marymount
Lynne Roberts, Pacific
Ryan Weisenberg, Pepperdine
Jim Sollars, Portland
Paul Thomas, Saint Mary's
Cindy Fisher, San Diego
Jennifer Azzi, San Francisco
Jennifer Mountain, Santa Clara

== Postseason ==
=== NCAA tournament ===
Seed	Bracket	School	First round	Second round	Sweet 16	Elite 8	Final Four	Championship
12	Lincoln Regional	BYU	#5 NC State; Mar. 22, Los Angeles; W, 72–57	#4 Nebraska; Mar. 24, Los Angeles; W, 80–76	#1 Connecticut; Mar. 29, Lincoln; L, 51–70			
6	Lincoln Regional	Gonzaga	#11 James Madison; Mar. 23, College Station; L, 63–72					
2 Bids	W-L (%):	TOTAL: 2–2 .500	1–1 .500	1–0 1.000	0–1 .000	0–0 –	0–0 –	0–0 –

=== WNIT ===
School	First round	Second round	Third round	Quarterfinals	Semifinals	Championship
San Diego	Cal Poly; Mar. 20, San Diego; W, 82–59	Montana; Mar. 24, Missoula; W, 60–57	Washington; Mar. 26, Seattle; L, 55–62			
Saint Mary's	Cal State Bakersfield; Mar. 21, Moraga; W, 75–68	UTEP; Mar. 24, El Paso; L, 64–76				
Pacific	Oregon; Mar. 20, Eugene; L, 63–90					
3 Bids; W-L (%); TOTAL: 3–3 .500	2–1 .667	1–1 .500	0–1 .000	0–0 –	0–0 –	0–0 –

=== WBI ===
No WCC teams participated in the 2014 WBI.

== Awards and honors ==
=== WCC Player-of-the-Week ===
- Nov. 11 - Kendall Kenyon, F, Pacific & Jackie Nared, G, Saint Mary's
- Nov. 25 – Danielle Mauldin, F, Saint Mary's
- Dec. 9 – Sunny Greinacher, F, Gonzaga
- Dec. 23 – Jackie Nared, G, Saint Mary's
- Jan. 6 – Bria Richardson, G, Pepperdine
- Jan. 20 – Jackie Nared, G, Saint Mary's
- Feb. 3 – Jennifer Hamson, C, BYU
- Feb. 17 – Hazel Ramirez, G, Loyola Marymount
- Nov. 18 – Jennifer Hamson, C, BYU
- Dec. 2 – Danielle Mauldin, F, Saint Mary's
- Dec. 16 – Katelyn McDaniel, F, San Diego
- Dec. 31 – Danielle Mauldin, F, Saint Mary's
- Jan. 13 – Sunny Greinacher, F, Gonzaga
- Jan. 27 – Haiden Palmer, G, Gonzaga
- Feb. 10 – Jennifer Hamson, C, BYU
- Feb. 24 - Kendall Kenyon, F, Pacific

=== College Madness West Coast Player of the Week ===
- Nov. 10 - Jackie Nared, G. Saint Mary's
- Nov. 24 – Danielle Mauldin, F, Saint Mary's
- Dec. 8 – Bria Richardson, G, Pepperdine
- Dec. 22 – Jackie Nared, G, Saint Mary's
- Jan. 5 – Amy Kame, G, San Diego
- Jan. 19 – Jackie Nared, G, Saint Mary's
- Feb. 2 – Danielle Mauldin, F, Saint Mary's
- Feb. 16 – Jennifer Hamson, C, BYU (also High-Major Madness Player of the Week)
- Mar. 2 – Haiden Palmer, G, Gonzaga
- Nov. 17 – Jennifer Hamson, C, BYU
- Dec. 1 – Jackie Nared, G, Saint Mary's
- Dec. 15 – Katelyn McDaniel, F, San Diego
- Dec. 29 – Danielle Mauldin, F, Saint Mary's
- Jan. 12 – KiKi Moore, G, Pacific
- Jan. 26 – Kendall Kenyon, F, Pacific
- Feb. 9 – Haiden Palmer, G, Gonzaga
- Feb. 23 - Kim Beeston, G, BYU

=== National Player of the Week Awards ===
- Dec. 29– Danielle Mauldin, F, Gonzaga– ESPNW National Player of the Week (Dec. 22–28)
- Jan. 6– Amy Kame, G, San Diego– NCAA National Player of the Week (Dec. 29–Jan. 5)
- Feb. 17– Jennifer Hamson, C, BYU– NCAA National Player of the Week (Feb. 10–16)

=== All-Americans ===
- Jennifer Hamson, C, BYU

=== All West Coast Conference teams ===
The voting body for all conference awards was league coaches.

- Player of the Year: Jennifer Hamson, C, BYU
- Newcomer of the Year: KiKi Moore, G, Pacific
- Defensive Player of the Year: Jennifer Hamson, C, BYU
- Coach of the Year: Kelly Graves, Gonzaga

=== All-Conference ===
Player	School	Year	Position
Lexi Eaton	BYU	Sophomore	G
Sunny Greinacher	Gonzaga	Junior	F
Jennifer Hamson	BYU	Senior	C
Amy Kame	San Diego	Senior	G
Kendall Kenyon	Pacific	Junior	F
Danielle Mauldin	Saint Mary's	Senior	F
KiKi Moore	Pacific	Senior	G
Jackie Nared	Saint Mary's	Senior	G
Haiden Palmer	Gonzaga	Junior	G
Hazel Ramirez	Loyola Marymount	Senior	G

=== Honorable Mention ===
Name	School
Morgan Bailey	BYU
Kim Beeston	BYU
Cassandra Brown	Portland
Zhane Dikes	San Francisco
Kate Gaze	Saint Mary's
Nici Gilday	Santa Clara
Malina Hood	San Diego
Taylor Proctor	San Francisco
Jazmine Redmon	Gonzaga
Felicia Wijenberg	San Diego
Jasmine Wooton	Portland

=== All-Freshman ===
Player	School	Position
Unique Coleman	Pacific	G
Allie Green	Pepperdine	G
Rachel Howard	San Francisco	G
Leslie Lopez-Wood	Loyola Marymount	G
Jo Paine	Santa Clara	F

=== All-Academic ===
Player	School	Year	GPA	Major
Kim Beeston	BYU	Senior	3.64	Public Health
Sophia Ederaine	San Diego	Junior	3.68	Biology
Nici Gilday	Santa Clara	Junior	3.64	Finance
Sunny Greinacher	Gonzaga	Junior	3.47	Psychology
Jennifer Hamson	BYU	Senior	3.51	Exercise Science
Amy Kame	San Diego	Senior	3.47	Communication Studies
Kari Luttinen	Portland	Junior	3.37	Business
Haiden Palmer	Gonzaga	Graduate	4.00	Communications and Leadership
Bria Richardson	Pepperdine	Junior	3.34	Liberal Arts
Paige Spietz	San Francisco	Junior	3.38	Environmental Science

== See also ==
- 2013-14 NCAA Division I women's basketball season
- West Coast Conference women's basketball tournament
- 2013–14 West Coast Conference men's basketball season
- West Coast Conference men's basketball tournament
- 2014 West Coast Conference men's basketball tournament
