= Crystal Hogan =

American basketball referee

Crystal Hogan (born 1977) is an American basketball referee.

Hogan was raised in Compton and attended Compton College, playing for their basketball team coached by Louie Nelson. She was recruited to Long Beach State on a full athletic scholarship and earned a degree in psychology before becoming a social worker.

After training as a referee, Hogan began officiating with the Long Beach Unit of the California Basketball Officials Association. She then watched the Drew League and eventually got to call games, including a foul on Kobe Bryant. She joined the Division 1 basketball officials in the 2018–19 season. She became the first woman to ever referee a men's Division 1 game when Seattle University played against Puget Sound University. She is also the first full-time referee in NCAA Men's D-1 history.

Besides her referee responsibilities, Hogan has also worked as a parole agent in California's Department of Corrections and Rehabilitations.
