= 2013–14 Air Force Falcons women's basketball team =

Intercollegiate basketball season

2013–14 Air Force Falcons women's basketball
- Conference: Mountain West Conference
- Record: 1–28 (0–18 Mountain West)
- Head coach: Andrea Williams (4th season)
- Assistant coaches: Lori Morris; Kelly Rotan; Stephanie Schueler
- Home arena: Clune Arena

2013–14 Mountain West Conference women's basketball standings
	Conf.				Overall
Team	W		L	PCT	W		L	PCT
Colorado State	15	–	3	.833	25	–	8	.758
Fresno State†	13	–	5	.722	22	–	11	.667
Nevada	12	–	6	.667	18	–	13	.581
Boise State	12	–	6	.667	18	–	14	.563
Wyoming	10	–	8	.556	20	–	11	.645
San Diego State	9	–	9	.500	13	–	17	.433
UNLV	9	–	9	.500	13	–	19	.406
Utah State	8	–	10	.444	15	–	16	.484
New Mexico	6	–	12	.333	11	–	19	.367
San Jose State	5	–	13	.278	11	–	19	.367
Air Force	0	–	18	.000	1	–	28	.034
† 2014 MWC tournament winner As of March 22, 2014; Rankings from AP poll

The 2013–14 Air Force Falcons women's basketball team represented United States Air Force Academy in the 2013–14 college basketball season. The Falcons, led by fourth year head coach Andrea Williams, played their home games at the Clune Arena and were members of the Mountain West Conference. They finished the season with 1–28 overall, 0–18 in Mountain West play for a last place finish. They lost in the first round of the 2014 Mountain West Conference women's basketball tournament to San Diego State.

== Roster ==
Number	Name	Position	Weight	Year	Hometown
3	Whitney Gordon	Forward	6–2	Sophomore	Marion, KS
4	Kayla Woodward	Forward	5–11	Junior	Sheridan, WY
5	Jasmine Davis	Guard	5–9	Sophomore	Petone, NZL
10	Marquelle Dent	Guard	5–7	Sophomore	Denver, CO
12	Fallon Lewis	Guard	6–0	Senior	Dayton, WY
21	Fatima Thiam	Center	6–6	Sophomore	Dakar, SEN
22	Jordan Kelley	Guard	5–9	RS Sophomore	Gillette, WY
23	Chelan Landry	Guard	5–9	Senior	Milwaukee, WI
31	Kaitlyn Mileto	Guard	5–10	Junior	Colorado Springs, CO
32	Kaylee Hoffman	Guard	5–10	Senior	Hays, KS
33	Hailey Logocki	Guard	5–8	Freshman	Sheridan, WY
40	Jordan Sibrel	Forward	6–1	Forward	Loveland, CO
45	Kayliem Rader	Center	6–4	Freshman	Thornton, CO

== Schedule ==
Date time, TV	Rank^{#}	Opponent^{#}	Result	Record	Site (attendance) city, state
Exhibition
11/04/2013*; 7:00 pm		Western State	W 74–48	–	Clune Arena (N/A); Colorado Springs, CO
Regular Season
11/08/2013*; 2:30 pm		at No. 12 North Carolina	L 26–87	0–1	Carmichael Arena (2,302); Chapel Hill, NC
11/12/2013*; 7:00 pm		Northern Colorado	L 60–71	0–2	Clune Arena (240); Colorado Springs, CO
11/16/2013*; 1:00 pm		Denver	L 64–72	0–3	Clune Arena (545); Colorado Springs, CO
11/26/2013*; 5:00 pm		at Weber State	L 69–81	0–4	Dee Events Center (1,373); Ogden, UT
12/01/2013*; 12:05 pm		at Wichita State	L 37–61	0–5	Charles Koch Arena (1,350); Wichita, KS
12/06/2013*; 7:00 pm		North Dakota State; Air Force Classic	W 82–63	1–5	Clune Arena (173); Colorado Springs, CO
12/07/2013*; 4:30 pm		SIU Edwardsville; Air Force Classic	L 55–76	1–6	Clune Arena (274); Colorado Springs, CO
12/11/2013*; 6:00 pm		at Nebraska-Onaha	L 56–84	1–7	Sapp Fieldhouse (579); Omaha, NE
12/20/2013*; 1:30 pm		at North Florida; UNF Osprey Classic	L 40–61	1–8	UNF Arena (387); Jacksonville, FL
12/21/2013*; 10:30 am		vs. Eastern Illinois; UNF Osprey Classic	L 55–76	1–9	UNF Arena (274); Jacksonville, FL
01/01/2014; 10:30 am		at Utah State	L 78–88	1–10 (0–1)	Smith Spectrum (571); Logan, UT
01/04/2014; 1:00 pm, MWN		UNLV	L 65–72	1–11 (0–2)	Clune Arena (368); Colorado Springs, CO
01/08/2014; 7:00 pm		Fresno State	L 43–77	1–12 (0–3)	Clune Arena (219); Colorado Springs, CO
01/11/2014; 2:00 pm		at San Diego State	L 39–72	1–13 (0–4)	Viejas Arena (524); San Diego, CA
01/15/2014; 2:00 pm		at San Jose State	L 70–79	1–14 (0–5)	Event Center Arena (432); San Jose, CA
01/18/2014; 1:00 pm		Colorado State	L 49–87	1–15 (0–6)	Clune Arena (635); Colorado Springs, CO
01/22/2014; 7:00 pm		at Wyoming	L 47–82	1–16 (0–7)	Arena-Auditorium (3,082); Laramie, WY
01/29/2014; 7:00 pm		Boise State	L 63–77	1–17 (0–8)	Clune Arena (258); Colorado Springs, CO
02/01/2014; 1:00 pm		Nevada	L 74–84 ^{OT}	1–18 (0–9)	Clune Arena (318); Colorado Springs, CO
02/05/2014; 7:00 pm		at Fresno State	L 49–76	1–19 (0–10)	Save Mart Center (2,411); Fresno, CA
02/08/2014; 12:00 pm		at Colorado State	L 28–88	1–20 (0–11)	Moby Arena (2,209); Fort Collins, CO
02/12/2014; 7:00 pm		San Jose State	L 71–84	1–21 (0–12)	Clune Arena (191); Colorado Springs, CO
02/15/2014; 1:00 pm		San Diego State	L 66–77	1–22 (0–13)	Clune Arena (329); Colorado Springs, CO
02/22/2014; 4:00 pm		at Nevada	L 43–76	1–23 (0–14)	Lawlor Events Center (1,318); Reno, NV
02/26/2014; 7:00 pm		Wyoming	L 32–73	1–24 (0–15)	Clune Arena (415); Colorado Springs, CO
03/01/2014; 4:00 pm, MWN		at UNLV	L 43–87	1–25 (0–16)	Cox Pavilion (1,001); Paradise, NV
03/04/2014; 7:00 pm, MWN		New Mexico	L 62–76	1–26 (0–17)	Clune Arena (232); Colorado Springs, CO
03/07/2014; 7:00 pm		at Boise State	L 44–75	1–27 (0–18)	Taco Bell Arena (906); Boise, ID
2014 Mountain West Conference women's basketball tournament
03/10/2014; 8:00 pm, MWN	(11)	vs. (6) San Diego State; First Round	L 56–63	1–28	Thomas & Mack Center (1,836); Paradise, NV
*Non-conference game. ^{#}Rankings from AP Poll. (#) Tournament seedings in parentheses. All times are in Mountain Time. All dates, times and TV are tentative and subject to change.

== See also ==
- 2013–14 Air Force Falcons men's basketball team
