= Yvonne Sanchez =

American basketball coach (born 1967)

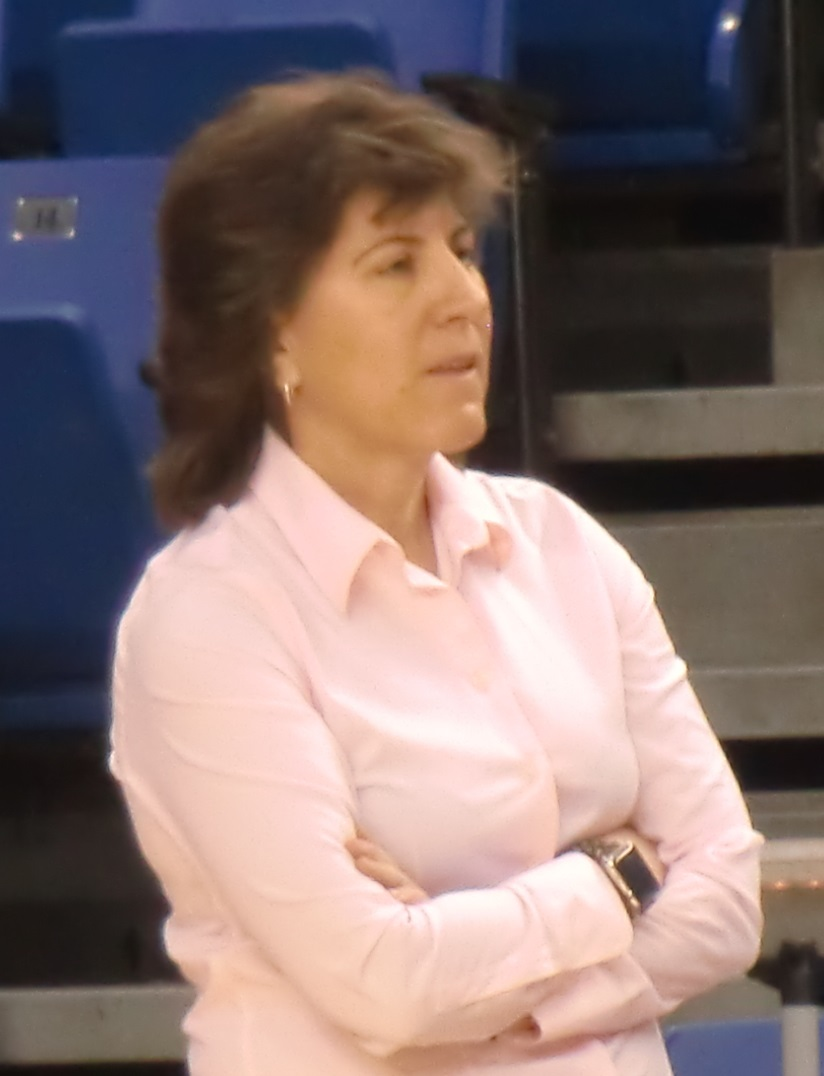
- Sanchez in 2016

Biographical details
- Born: December 5, 1967 (age 58); Los Alamos, New Mexico, U.S.

Playing career
- 1985–1989: United States International

Coaching career (HC unless noted)
- 1993–1999: New Mexico State (asst.)
- 1999–2000: San Diego State (asst.)
- 2000–2011: New Mexico (asst.)
- 2011–2016: New Mexico
- 2018–2021: Michigan (asst.)
- 2021–2025: Arizona State (asst.)

Head coaching record
- Overall: 77–81 (.487)

Accomplishments and honors

Awards
- 2015 Mountain West Coach of the Year

Yvonne Marie Sanchez (born December 5, 1967) is an American basketball coach who is currently an assistant women's basketball coach at Arizona State.

== Career ==
From 2011 to 2016, Sanchez was head coach at New Mexico.

After leaving New Mexico, Sanchez returned to her alma mater Eldorado High School in Albuquerque, initially as an educational assistant for students who have autism. In June 2016, she became a volunteer assistant boys' basketball coach at Eldorado High on the staff of her brother Roy Sanchez.

On July 2, 2018, Sanchez joined the staff of Kim Barnes Arico at Michigan as an assistant coach. On April 29, 2021, Sanchez left Michigan to become an assistant coach at Arizona State under Charli Turner Thorne.

== Head coaching record ==
Record table
Season	Team	Overall	Conference	Standing	Postseason
New Mexico Lobos (Mountain West Conference) (2011–2016)
2011–12	New Mexico	11–20	3–11	7th	
2012–13	New Mexico	17–14	8–8	T-4th	
2013–14	New Mexico	11–19	6–12	9th	
2014–15	New Mexico	21–13	14–4	2nd	WBI Second Round
2015–16	New Mexico	17–15	9–9	5th	WBI First Round
New Mexico:		77–81 (.487)	40–44 (.476)		
Total:		77–81 (.487)			
National champion Postseason invitational champion Conference regular season champion Conference regular season and conference tournament champion Division regular season champion Division regular season and conference tournament champion Conference tournament champion
