= 2014 Mountain West Conference women's basketball tournament =

- Classification: Division I
- Season: 2013–14
- Teams: 11
- Site: Thomas & Mack Center; Paradise, NV
- Television: CBSSN, MWN

The 2014 Mountain West Conference women's basketball tournament was held on March 10–15, 2014 at the Thomas & Mack Center in Las Vegas, Nevada. With San Jose State and Utah State added to the MWC, the MWC had an 11 team tournament for 2014. The top 5 seeds got the first round bye. For the 2nd year in a row all games but the championship were streamed online through the Mountain West Network. CBS Sports Network aired the championship. The tournament champion received the Mountain West's only bid to the 2014 NCAA tournament.

2013–14 Mountain West Conference women's basketball standings
	Conf.				Overall
Team	W		L	PCT	W		L	PCT
Colorado State	15	–	3	.833	25	–	8	.758
Fresno State†	13	–	5	.722	22	–	11	.667
Nevada	12	–	6	.667	18	–	13	.581
Boise State	12	–	6	.667	18	–	14	.563
Wyoming	10	–	8	.556	20	–	11	.645
San Diego State	9	–	9	.500	13	–	17	.433
UNLV	9	–	9	.500	13	–	19	.406
Utah State	8	–	10	.444	15	–	16	.484
New Mexico	6	–	12	.333	11	–	19	.367
San Jose State	5	–	13	.278	11	–	19	.367
Air Force	0	–	18	.000	1	–	28	.034
† 2014 MWC tournament winner As of March 22, 2014; Rankings from AP poll

== Seeds ==
Teams are seeded by conference record, with a ties broken by record between the tied teams followed by record against the regular-season champion, if necessary.

Seed	School	Conf (Overall)	Tiebreaker
#1	Colorado State	15–3	
#2	Fresno State	13–5	
#3	Nevada	12–6	
#4	Boise State	12–6	
#5	Wyoming	10–8	
#6	San Diego State	9–9	
#7	UNLV	9–9	
#8	Utah State	8–10	
#9	New Mexico	6–12	
#10	San Jose State	5–13	
#11	Air Force	0–18	

== Schedule ==
Game	Time*	Matchup^{#}	Television
First round – Monday, March 10
1	2:00 pm	#8 Utah State vs. #9 New Mexico	MWN
2	4:30 pm	#7 UNLV vs. #10 San Jose State	MWN
3	7:00 pm	#6 San Diego vs. #11 Air Force	MWN
Quarterfinals – Tuesday, March 11
4	Noon	#1 Colorado State vs. #8 Utah State	MWN
5	2:30 pm	#4 Boise State vs. #5 Wyoming	MWN
6	6:00 pm	#3 Nevada vs. #6 San Diego State	MWN
7	8:30 pm	#2 Fresno State vs. #7 UNLV	MWN
Semifinals – Friday, March 14
8	12:00 pm	#1 Colorado State vs. #5 Wyoming	MWN
9	2:30 pm	#2 Fresno State vs. #3 Nevada	MWN
Championship – Saturday, March 15
10	7:00 pm	#1 Colorado State vs. #2 Fresno State	CBSSN
*Game Times in PT. #-Rankings denote tournament seeding.

== Bracket ==
First round Monday, March 10; MWN
8	Utah State	69
9	New Mexico	66
7	UNLV	78
10	San Jose State	75
6	San Diego State	63
11	Air Force	56

Quarterfinals; Tuesday, March 11; MWN
1	Colorado State	72
8	Utah State	67
4	Boise State	56
5	Wyoming	61
2	Fresno State	80
7	UNLV	65
3	Nevada	53
6	San Diego State	48

Semifinals; Friday, March 14; MWN
1	Colorado State	95
5	Wyoming	92^{3OT}
2	Fresno State	82
3	Nevada	71

Championship; Saturday, March 15; CBSSN
1	Colorado State	68
2	Fresno State	77
