= 2013–14 Wyoming Cowgirls basketball team =

Intercollegiate basketball season

2013–14 Wyoming Cowgirls basketball
- Conference: Mountain West Conference
- Record: 20–11 (10–8 Mountain West)
- Head coach: Joe Legerski (11th season)
- Assistant coaches: Gerald Mattinson; Katie Kern; Mike Petrino
- Home arena: Arena-Auditorium

2013–14 Mountain West Conference women's basketball standings
	Conf.				Overall
Team	W		L	PCT	W		L	PCT
Colorado State	15	–	3	.833	25	–	8	.758
Fresno State†	13	–	5	.722	22	–	11	.667
Nevada	12	–	6	.667	18	–	13	.581
Boise State	12	–	6	.667	18	–	14	.563
Wyoming	10	–	8	.556	20	–	11	.645
San Diego State	9	–	9	.500	13	–	17	.433
UNLV	9	–	9	.500	13	–	19	.406
Utah State	8	–	10	.444	15	–	16	.484
New Mexico	6	–	12	.333	11	–	19	.367
San Jose State	5	–	13	.278	11	–	19	.367
Air Force	0	–	18	.000	1	–	28	.034
† 2014 MWC tournament winner As of March 22, 2014; Rankings from AP poll

The 2013–14 Wyoming Cowgirls basketball team represented University of Wyoming in the 2013–14 college basketball season. The Cowgirls, led by eleventh year head coach Joe Legerski, played their home games at the Arena-Auditorium and were members of the Mountain West Conference.

== Roster ==
2013–14 Wyoming Cowgirls women's basketball team
Players
Coaches

Pos.	#	Name	Height	Year	Previous school	Hometown
F	3	Whitney Gordon	6 ft 2 in (1.88 m)	So	Marion HS	Marion, KS
F	4	Kayla Woodward	5 ft 11 in (1.8 m)	Jr	Sheridan HS	Sheridan, WY
G	5	Jasmine Davis	5 ft 9 in (1.75 m)	So	Sheridan College	Petone, NZL
G	10	Marquelle Dent	5 ft 7 in (1.7 m)	So	Regis Jesuit HS	Denver, CO
G	12	Fallon Lewis	6 ft 0 in (1.83 m)	Sr	Sheridan College	Dayton, WY
C	21	Fatima Thiam	6 ft 6 in (1.98 m)	So	Lycee Galandou Diouf	Dakar, SEN
G	22	Jordan Kelley	5 ft 9 in (1.75 m)	RS So	Washington State; Campbell County HS	Gillette, WY
G	23	Chelan Landry	5 ft 9 in (1.75 m)	Sr	Milwaukee Vincent HS	Milwaukee, WI
G	31	Kaitlyn Mileto	5 ft 10 in (1.78 m)	Jr	Mesa Ridge HS	Colorado Springs, CO
G	32	Kaylee Hoffman	5 ft 10 in (1.78 m)	Sr	Thomas More Prep-Marian HS	Hays, KS
G	33	Hailey Ligocki	5 ft 8 in (1.73 m)	Fr	Sheridan HS	Sheridan, WY
F	40	Jordan Sibrel	6 ft 1 in (1.85 m)	Jr	Thompson Valley HS	Loveland, CO
C	45	Kaylie Rader	6 ft 4 in (1.93 m)	Fr	Horizon HS	Thornton, CO

Head coach

- Joe Legerski

Assistant coach(es)

- Gerald Mattinson
- Katie Kern
- Mike Petrino

Legend

- (C) Team captain
- (S) Suspended
- (I) Ineligible
- (W) Walk-on
- Injured
- Current redshirt

Roster

== Schedule ==
Date time, TV	Rank^{#}	Opponent^{#}	Result	Record	Site (attendance) city, state
Exhibition
11/01/2013*; 7:00 pm		Chadron State	W 92–35	–	Arena-Auditorium (3,032); Laramie, WY
Regular Season
11/08/2013*; 8:00 pm		vs. MSU Northern	W 71–57	1–0	Sheridan Golden Dome (1,649); Sheridan, WY
11/12/2013*; 7:00 pm		at Denver	W 73–70	2–0	Magness Arena (687); Denver, CO
11/15/2013*; 7:00 pm		Montana State	W 72–62	3–0	Arena-Auditorium (3,505); Laramie, WY
11/23/2013*; 6:00 pm		Pepperdine	W 84–64	4–0	Arena-Auditorium (3,518); Laramie, WY
11/30/2013*; 1:00 pm		at South Dakota	L 78–82	4–1	DakotaDome (1,021); Vermillion, SD
12/04/2013*; 7:00 pm		No. 11 Colorado	L 59–63	4–2	Arena-Auditorium (2,956); Laramie, WY
12/06/2013*; 4:30 pm		vs. SIU Edwardsville; Air Force Classic	W 87–63	5–2	Clune Arena (113); Colorado Springs, CO
12/07/2013*; 2:00 pm		vs. North Dakota State; Air Force Classic	W 72–69	6–2	Clune Arena (147); Colorado Springs, CO
12/14/2013*; 2:00 pm		Ball State	W 71–51	7–2	Arena-Auditorium (3,119); Laramie, WY
12/17/2013*; 7:00 pm		Montana	W 79–65	8–2	Arena-Auditorium (2,898); Laramie, WY
12/21/2013*; 1:00 pm		at Idaho	W 72–64	9–2	Cowan Spectrum (405); Moscow, ID
01/04/2014; 2:00 pm		Nevada	W 72–64	10–2 (1–0)	Arena-Auditorium (3,463); Laramie, WY
01/08/2014; 7:00 pm		at New Mexico	L 65–75	10–3 (1–1)	The Pit (5,445); Albuquerque, NM
01/11/2014; 2:00 pm		Boise State	W 55–48	11–3 (2–1)	Arena-Auditorium (3,280); Laramie, WY
01/18/2014; 3:00 pm		at San Jose State	L 68–74	11–4 (2–2)	Event Center Arena (362); San Jose, CA
01/22/2014; 7:00 pm		Air Force	W 82–47	12–4 (3–2)	Arena-Auditorium (3,082); Laramie, WY
01/25/2014; 5:00 pm		at Nevada	L 69–72	12–5 (3–3)	Lawlor Events Center (1,671); Reno, NV
01/29/2014; 7:00 pm		Fresno State	W 87–76	13–5 (4–3)	Arena-Auditorium (3,203); Laramie, WY
02/01/2014; 7:00 pm		at Utah State	L 75–80	13–6 (4–4)	Smith Spectrum (862); Logan, UT
02/05/2014; 7:00 pm		New Mexico	W 79–75	14–6 (5–4)	Arena-Auditorium (2,974); Laramie, WY
02/08/2014; 2:00 pm		UNLV	W 82–56	15–6 (6–4)	Arena-Auditorium (3,452); Laramie, WY
02/12/2014; 7:00 pm		at San Diego State	W 69–60	16–6 (7–4)	Viejas Arena (353); San Diego, CA
02/15/2014; 2:00 pm		San Jose State	W 103–80	17–6 (8–4)	Arena-Auditorium (3.787); Laramie, WY
02/19/2014; 8:00 pm		at Fresno State	L 60–65	17–7 (8–5)	Save Mart Center (2,316); Fresno, CA
02/22/2014; 2:00 pm		Colorado State	W 75–49	18–7 (9–5)	Arena-Auditorium (4,955); Laramie, WY
02/26/2014; 7:00 pm		at Air Force	W 73–32	19–7 (10–5)	Clune Arena (415); Colorado Springs, CO
03/01/2014; 2:00 pm		at Boise State	L 59–72	19–8 (10–6)	Taco Bell Arena (776); Boise, ID
03/04/2014; 7:00 pm		Utah State	L 80–84	19–9 (10–7)	Arena-Auditorium (3,061); Laramie, WY
03/07/2014; 7:00 pm		at Colorado State	L 46–58	19–10 (10–8)	Arena-Auditorium (3,119); Laramie, WY
2014 Mountain West Conference women's basketball tournament
03/11/2014; 2:30 pm		vs. Boise State; Quarterfinals	W 61–56	20–10	Thomas & Mack Center (2,462); Paradise, NV
03/12/2014; 1:00 pm		vs. Colorado State; Semifinals	L 92–95 ^{3OT}	20–11	Thomas & Mack Center (N/A); Paradise, NV
*Non-conference game. ^{#}Rankings from AP Poll. (#) Tournament seedings in parentheses. All times are in Mountain Time. All dates, times and TV are tentative and subject to change.

== See also ==
- 2013–14 Wyoming Cowboys basketball team
