= 2013–14 Loyola Marymount Lions women's basketball team =

Intercollegiate basketball season

2013–14 Loyola Marymount Lions women's basketball
- Conference: West Coast Conference
- Record: 9–21 (6–12 WCC)
- Head coach: Charity Elliott (2nd season)
- Assistant coaches: Alexis Mezzetta; Chris Elliott; Kiva Herman
- Home arena: Gersten Pavilion

2013–14 West Coast Conference women's basketball standings
| | Conf. | | | | Overall |
| Team | W | | L | PCT | W | | L | PCT |
|---|---|---|---|---|---|---|---|---|
| No. 18 Gonzaga† | 16 | – | 2 | .889 | 29 | – | 5 | .853 |
| BYU | 14 | – | 4 | .778 | 28 | – | 7 | .800 |
| Pacific | 12 | – | 6 | .667 | 18 | – | 13 | .581 |
| Saint Mary's | 11 | – | 7 | .611 | 23 | – | 10 | .697 |
| San Diego | 11 | – | 7 | .611 | 24 | – | 9 | .727 |
| Portland | 7 | – | 11 | .389 | 14 | – | 16 | .467 |
| Santa Clara | 6 | – | 12 | .333 | 10 | – | 20 | .333 |
| San Francisco | 6 | – | 12 | .333 | 12 | – | 19 | .387 |
| Loyola Marymount | 6 | – | 12 | .333 | 9 | – | 21 | .300 |
| Pepperdine | 1 | – | 17 | .056 | 6 | – | 25 | .194 |
† 2014 WCC tournament winner As of March 29, 2014; Rankings from AP Poll

The 2013–14 Loyola Marymount Lions women's basketball team represented Loyola Marymount University in the 2013–14 college basketball season. The Lions, members of the West Coast Conference, were led by head coach Charity Elliott, in her 2nd season at the school. The Lions played their home games at the Gersten Pavilion on the university campus in Los Angeles, California.

== Before the Season ==
Chris Elliott, husband of Charity Elliott, became a full-time assistant for the 2013–14 season after replacing Tracy Wolff midway through the 2012–13 season. Meanwhile, Kiva Herman was hired as a new assistant coach after Jackie Stiles moved on to Missouri State University as an assistant head coach.

== Roster ==
2013–14 Loyola Marymount Lions women's basketball team
Players
Coaches

| Pos. | # | Name | Height | Year | Previous school | Hometown |
|---|---|---|---|---|---|---|
| G | 2 | Shelbi Aimonetti | 5 ft 8 in (1.73 m) | Fr | St. Francis | Redwood City, CA |
| G | 4 | Hazel Ramirez | 5 ft 5 in (1.65 m) | Sr | Inglewood | Huntington Beach, CA |
| G/F | 5 | Chelsea Barnes | 5 ft 10 in (1.78 m) | So | Diamond Ranch | Covina, CA |
| G/F | 10 | Alyson Lock | 5 ft 10 in (1.78 m) | Fr | Mark Keppel | Montebello, CA |
| F | 11 | Melinda Gomez | 5 ft 11 in (1.8 m) | Sr | South Hills | W. Covina, CA |
| G | 13 | Deanna Johnson | 5 ft 7 in (1.7 m) | RS So | Norco | Corona, CA |
| F | 15 | Emily Ben-Jumbo | 6 ft 1 in (1.85 m) | Jr | Tualatin | Tualatin, OR |
| G/F | 20 | Sophie Taylor | 6 ft 0 in (1.83 m) | So | Acalanes | Lafayette, CA |
| G | 21 | Taylor Anderson | 6 ft 0 in (1.83 m) | Jr | Bonita | La Verne, CA |
| G | 22 | Olivia Lucero | 5 ft 8 in (1.73 m) | Fr | Highland | Gilbert, AZ |
| G | 23 | Leslie Lopez-Wood | 5 ft 9 in (1.75 m) | Fr | Bishop Alemany | North Hollywood, CA |
| G | 24 | Jade Cheldelin | 5 ft 9 in (1.75 m) | Fr | Lincoln | Portland, OR |
| C | 32 | Alexis Love | 6 ft 2 in (1.88 m) | Sr | Norwalk | Norwalk, CA |
| C | 33 | Brianna Kennedy | 6 ft 3 in (1.91 m) | So | Bonita | La Verne, CA |
| F/C | 35 | Mackenzie Kerins | 6 ft 1 in (1.85 m) | Sr | South Eugene | Eugene, OR |

Head coach

- Charity Elliott (Missouri State)

Assistant coach(es)

- Alexis Mezzetta (UC San Diego)
- Chris Elliott (Missouri State)
- Kiva Herman (San Diego)

Legend

- (C) Team captain
- (S) Suspended
- (I) Ineligible
- (W) Walk-on
- Injured
- Current redshirt

Roster

== Schedule ==
| Date time, TV | Rank^{#} | Opponent^{#} | Result | Record | Site city, state |
Exhibition
| 11/04/2013*; 7:00 pm, LMUSN | | Cal State San Bernardino | W 82–51 | - | Gersten Pavilion; Los Angeles, CA |
Regular Season
| 11/09/2013*; 2:00 pm, MW Net | | at New Mexico | L 65–69 | 0–1 | The Pit; Albuquerque, NM |
| 11/13/2013*; 6:00 pm, MW Net | | at Utah State | L 58–100 | 0–2 | Smith Spectrum; Logan, UT |
| 11/16/2013*; 2:00 pm, LMUSN | | New Mexico State | W 81–64 | 1–2 | Gersten Pavilion; Los Angeles, CA |
| 11/21/2013*; 7:00 pm | | at Oregon State | L 54–92 | 1–3 | Gill Coliseum; Corvallis, OR |
| 11/23/2013*; 4:00 pm, BigWest.TV | | at Long Beach State | L 66–76 | 1–4 | Walter Pyramid; Long Beach, CA |
| 11/29/2013*; 3:00 pm, LMUSN | | UC Irvine; DoubleTree LA West Side Thanksgiving Classic | L 60–63 | 1–5 | Gersten Pavilion; Los Angeles, CA |
| 11/30/2013*; 1:00, LMUSN | | Montana; DoubleTree LA West Side Thanksgiving Classic | L 47–49 | 1–6 | Gersten Pavilion; Los Angeles, CA |
| 12/05/2013*; 6:00 pm, MW Net | | at Colorado State | L 68–70 | 1–7 | Moby Arena; Ft. Collins, CO |
| 12/07/2013*; 2:00 pm, LMUSN | | Northern Arizona | W 79–58 | 2–7 | Gersten Pavilion; Los Angeles, CA |
| 12/14/2013*; 2:00 pm, LMUSN | | UNLV | W 71–67 | 3–7 | Gersten Pavilion; Los Angeles, CA |
| 12/19/2013*; 7:00 pm, LMUSN | | Seattle | L 70–72 | 3–8 | Gersten Pavilion; Los Angeles, CA |
| 12/28/2013; 1:00 pm, BYUtv | | at BYU | L 72–90 | 3–9 (0–1) | Marriott Center; Provo, UT |
| 12/30/2012; 6:00 pm | | at San Diego | L 63–87 | 3–10 (0–2) | Jenny Craig Pavilion; San Diego, CA |
| 01/02/2013; 7:00 pm, LMUSN | | San Francisco | L 76–80 | 3–11 (0–3) | Gersten Pavilion; Los Angeles, CA |
| 01/04/2014; 2:00 pm, LMUSN | | Santa Clara | L 65–69 | 3–12 (0–4) | Gersten Pavilion; Los Angeles, CA |
| 01/11/2014; 2:00 pm, TV-32 | | at Pepperdine | W 76–64 | 4–12 (1–4) | Firestone Fieldhouse; Malibu, CA |
| 01/16/2014; 7:00 pm, TheW.tv | | at Pacific | W 90–84 | 5–12 (2–4) | Alex G. Spanos Center; Stockton, CA |
| 01/18/2014; 1:00 pm | | at Saint Mary's | L 74–78 | 5–13 (2–5) | McKeon Pavilion; Moraga, CA |
| 01/23/2014; 7:00 pm, LMUSN | | Gonzaga | L 82–91 ^{OT} | 5–14 (2–6) | Gersten Pavilion; Los Angeles, CA |
| 01/25/2014; 2:00 pm, LMUSN | | Portland | W 78–64 | 6–14 (3–6) | Gersten Pavilion; Los Angeles, CA |
| 02/01/2014; 2:00 pm, LMUSN | | Pepperdine | W 90–74 | 7–14 (4–6) | Gersten Pavilion; Los Angeles, CA |
| 02/06/2014; 7:00 pm | | at Portland | L 66–84 | 7–15 (4–7) | Chiles Center; Portland, OR |
| 02/08/2014; 2:00 pm, SWX | | at No. 20 Gonzaga | L 51–88 | 7–16 (4–8) | McCarthey Athletic Center; Spokane, WA |
| 02/13/2014; 7:00 pm, LMUSN | | Saint Mary's | W 76–74 | 8–16 (5–8) | Gersten Pavilion; Los Angeles, CA |
| 02/15/2014; 2:00 pm, LMUSN | | Pacific | L 95–102 | 8–17 (5–9) | Gersten Pavilion; Los Angeles, CA |
| 02/19/2014; 7:00 pm, LMUSN | | San Diego | L 74–87 | 8–18 (5–10) | Gersten Pavilion; Los Angeles, CA |
| 02/22/2014; 2:00 pm, LMUSN | | BYU | L 67–91 | 9–19 (5–11) | Gersten Pavilion; Los Angeles, CA |
| 02/27/2014; 7:00 pm | | at Santa Clara | W 88–74 | 10–19 (6–11) | Leavey Center; Santa Clara, CA |
| 03/01/2014; 2:00 pm | | at San Francisco | L 79–80 | 10–20 (6–12) | War Memorial Gymnasium; San Francisco, CA |
2014 West Coast Conference women's basketball tournament
| 03/06/2014; 2:00 pm, BYUtv | | vs. San Francisco | L 62–63 | 10–21 | Orleans Arena; Las Vegas, NV |
*Non-conference game. ^{#}Rankings from AP Poll. (#) Tournament seedings in parentheses.

== Game summaries ==
=== Exhibition: Cal State San Bernardino ===
LMUSN

Nov 4
7:05 pm PST

Recap

Cal State San Bernardino Coyotes 51, Loyola Marymount Lions 82
Scoring by half: 22-40, 29-42
| Pts: Alexcia Mack 20; Rebs: Tayllor Gibson & Davis 6 Asts: Tayllor Gibson 2 | Pts: Melinda Gomez 12; Rebs: Mackenzie Kerins 7 Asts: Hazel Ramirez 5 |

Gersten Pavilion
Los Angeles, CA
Attendance: 279
Referees: Kyle Bacon, Penny Davis, Kenneth Nash

=== New Mexico ===
MW Net

Nov 9
3:00 pm MST

Recap

Loyola Marymount Lions 65, New Mexico Lobos 69
Scoring by half: 35-29, 30-40
| Pts: Hazel Ramirez 18; Rebs: Emily Ben-Jumbo 7 Asts: Hazel Ramirez & Olivia Lucero 4 | Pts: Antiesha Brown 28; Rebs: Antiesha Ramirez 11; Asts: Bryce Owens 4 |

The Pit
Albuquerque, NM
Attendance: 5,439
Referees: Brenda Pantoja, Jess Martinez, Kyle Bacon

=== Utah State ===
MW Net

Nov 13
7:00 pm MST

Recap

Loyola Marymount Lions 58, Utah State Aggies 100
Scoring by half: 24-48, 34-52
| Pts: Emily Ben-Jumbo 12; Rebs: Taylor Anderson 10; Asts: Taylor Anderson & Leslie Lopez-Wood 3 | Pts: Makenlee Williams 19; Rebs: Stephanie Bairstow 13; Asts: Elise Nelson 7 |

Smith Spectrum
Logan, UT
Attendance: 445
Referees: Lisa Jones, Rick Thorne, Teresa Turner

=== New Mexico State ===
LMUSN

Nov 16
2:00 pm PST

Recap

New Mexico State Aggies 64, Loyola Marymount Lions 81
Scoring by half: 22-39, 42-42
| Pts: Vanessa Garner 26; Rebs: September Offutt 11; Asts: Sasha Weber & Moriah Mack 4 | Pts: Chelsea Barnes & Deanna Johnson 14; Rebs: Mackenzie Kerins 14; Asts: Hazel Ramirez 6 |

Gersten Pavilion
Los Angeles, CA
Attendance: 445
Referees: Melissa Barlow, Bethany Graves, Michol Murray

=== Oregon State ===
Nov 21
6:00 pm PST

Recap

Loyola Marymount Lions 54, Oregon State Beavers 92
Scoring by half: 20-47, 34-45
| Pts: Chelsea Barnes 16; Rebs: Emily Ben-Jumbo & Taylor Anderson 4 Asts: Hazel Ramirez 3 | Pts: Jamie Weisner 17; Rebs: Deven Hunter 9 Asts: Jamie Weisner 6 |

Gill Coliseum
Corvallis, OR
Attendance: 923
Referees: Charles Gonzales, Penny Davis, Richard Waters

=== Long Beach State ===
BigWest.tv

Nov 23
4:00 pm PST

Recap

Loyola Marymount Lions 66, Long Beach State 49ers 76
Scoring by half: 32-35, 34-41
| Pts: Hazel Ramirez 22; Rebs: Emily Ben-Jumbo 12; Asts: Taylor Anderson 5 | Pts: Raven Benton 16; Rebs: Raven Benton 10; Asts: Hallie Meneses 5 |

Walter Pyramid
Long Beach, CA
Attendance: 1,723
Referees: Victor Dunomes, Deon Lewis, Norma Leibfreid

=== UC Irvine ===
LMUSN

Nov 29
3:00 pm PST

Recap

UC Irvine Anteaters 63, Loyola Marymount Lions 60
Scoring by half: 33-23, 30-37
| Pts: Jennifer Tsurumoto & Methlyn Onogomuho 16; Rebs: Camille Buckley 16; Asts: Jennifer Tsurumoto 5 | Pts: Sophie Taylor 16; Rebs: Mackenzie Kerins 8 Asts: Hazel Ramirez 7 |

Gersten Pavilion
Los Angeles, CA
Attendance: 515
Referees: Wanda Szeremeta, Benny Luna, Renee Robinson

=== Montana ===
LMUSN

Nov 30
1:00 pm PST

Recap

Montana Lady Griz 49, Loyola Marymount Lions 47
Scoring by half: 19-23, 30-24
| Pts: Carly Selvig 12; Rebs: Jordan Sullivan 9 Asts: Torry Hill 6 | Pts: Hazel Ramirez 11; Rebs: MacKenzie Kerins & Sophie Taylor 8 Asts: Hazel Ramirez 6 |

Gersten Pavilion
Los Angeles, CA
Attendance: N/A
Referees: Wanda Szeremeta, Brian Woods, In'Fini Robinson

=== Colorado State ===
MW Net

Dec 5
7:00 pm MST

Recap

Loyola Marymount Lions 68, Colorado State Rams 70
Scoring by half: 33-25, 35-45
| Pts: Hazel Ramirez 13; Rebs: Mackenzie Kerins 11; Asts: Hazel Ramirez, Emily Ben-Jumbo, & Deanna Johnson 4 | Pts: Sam Martin 20; Rebs: Sam Martin & Caitlin Duffy 5 Asts: Gritt Ryder 5 |

Moby Arena
Ft. Collins, CO
Attendance: 840
Referees: Lisa Jones, Randy Campbell, Jack Jones

=== Northern Arizona ===
LMUSN

Dec 7
1:00 pm PST

Recap

Northern Arizona Lumberjacks 58, Loyola Marymount Lions 79
Scoring by half: 29-29, 29-50
| Pts: Erikka Banks 16; Rebs: Brittani Lusain, Priscilla Brooks, & Raven Anderson 7 Asts: Brittani Lusain 6 | Pts: Hazel Ramirez 18; Rebs: MacKenzie Kerins 12; Asts: Hazel Ramirez 9; 15 min power outage at 19:18 in 1st Half |

Gersten Pavilion
Los Angeles, CA
Attendance: 390
Referees: Robert Scofield, Alex Caroll, Tiffany Bird

=== UNLV ===
LMUSN

Dec 14
2:00 pm PST

Recap

UNLV Lady Rebels 67, Loyola Marymount Lions 71
Scoring by half: 28-31, 39-40
| Pts: Alana Cesarz 20; Rebs: Aley Rhode 10; Asts: Rmanii Haynes 7 | Pts: Deanna Johnson 23; Rebs: Mackenzie Kerins 9 Asts: Hazel Ramirez 8 |

Gersten Pavilion
Los Angeles, CA
Attendance: 534
Referees: Rick Showers, Benny Luna, In'Fini Robinson

=== Seattle ===
LMUSN

Dec 19
7:00 pm PST

Recap

Seattle Redhawks 72, Loyola Marymount Lions 70
Scoring by half: 33-35, 39-35
| Pts: Alexis Montgomery 14; Rebs: Alexis Montgomery 6 Asts: Ashley Ward & Alexis Montgomery 6 | Pts: Hazel Ramirez 15; Rebs: MacKenzie Kerins 6 Asts: Hazel Ramirez 9 |

Gersten Pavilion
Los Angeles, CA
Attendance: 130
Referees: Marianne Karp, Gordon Torigoe, Cheryll Blue

=== BYU ===
Series History: BYU leads series 6-1
Broadcasters: Spencer Linton and Kristen Kozlowski

BYUtv

Dec 28
2:05 pm MST

Recap

Loyola Marymount Lions 72, BYU Cougars 90
Scoring by half: 36-46, 36-44
| Pts: Deanna Johnson 18; Rebs: Sophie Taylor & MacKenzie Kerins 6 Asts: Hazel Ramirez 3 | Pts: Jennifer Hamson 31; Rebs: Ashley Garfield 14; Asts: Kylie Maeda 7 |

Marriott Center
Provo, UT
Attendance: 755
Referees: Anita Ortega, Cheryl Flores, Richard Waters

=== San Diego ===
Series History: San Diego leads 38-27

USD TV

Dec 30
6:05 pm PST

Recap

Loyola Marymount Lions 63, San Diego Toreros 86
Scoring by half: 29-45, 34-41
| Pts: Hazel Ramirez 24; Rebs: Mackenzie Keirns 8 Asts: Hazel Ramirez, Sophie Taylor, & Brianna Kennedy 1 | Pts: Malina Hood 27; Rebs: Sophia Ederaine 12; Asts: Felicia Wijenberg 5 |

Jenny Craig Pavilion
San Diego, CA
Attendance: 360
Referees: Darren Krzesnik, Alecia Murray, Lisa Ulmer

=== San Francisco ===
Series History: Loyola Marymount leads 33-31

LMUSN

Jan 2
7:00 pm PST

Recap

San Francisco Dons 80, Loyola Marymount Lions 76
Scoring by half: 38-36, 42-40
| Pts: Taj Winston 19; Rebs: Taylor Proctor 12; Asts: Zhane Dikes 4 | Pts: Leslie Lopez-Wood 18; Rebs: MacKenzie Kerins 11; Asts: Hazel Ramirez 6 |

Gersten Pavilion
Los Angeles, CA
Attendance: 241
Referees: Charles Gonzales, Karen Lasuik, Kenneth Nash

=== Santa Clara ===
Series History: Santa Clara leads 43-20

LMUSN

Jan 4
2:00 pm PST

Recap

Santa Clara Broncos 69, Loyola Marymount Lions 65
Scoring by half: 31-24, 38-41
| Pts: Nici Gilday 34; Rebs: Marie Bertholdt 10; Asts: Raquel Avila 5 | Pts: Deanna Johnson 19; Rebs: MacKenzie Kerins 12; Asts: Deanna Johnson 6 |

Gersten Pavilion
Los Angeles, CA
Attendance: 489
Referees: Lucy Banuelos, Steve Belnap, Brenda Pantoja

=== Pepperdine ===
Series History: Pepperdine leads 50-18
Broadcaster: Josh Perigo

TV-32

Jan 11
2:00 pm PST

Recap

Loyola Marymount Lions 76, Pepperdine Waves 64
Scoring by half: 37-34, 39-30
| Pts: Sophie Taylor 27; Rebs: Emily Ben-Jumbo & Sophie Taylor 8 Asts: Hazel Ramirez 10 | Pts: Bria Richardson 21; Rebs: Ea Shoushtari 10; Asts: Bria Richardson & Keitra Wallace 3 |

Firestone Fieldhouse
Malibu, CA
Attendance: 401
Referees: Karen Lasuik, Crystal Hogan, Richard Waters

=== Pacific ===
Series History: Pacific leads series 1-0
Broadcasters: Don Gubbins and Alex Sanchez

TheW.tv

Jan 16
7:00 pm PST

Recap

Loyola Marymount Lions 84, Pacific Tigers 90
Scoring by half: 55-36, 35-48
| Pts: Hazel Ramirez 25; Rebs: Mackenzie Kerins 11; Asts: Hazel Ramirez 7 | Pts: Kiki Moore 22; Rebs: Kendall Kenyon 13; Asts: Kiki Moore 5 |

Alex G. Spanos Center
Stockton, CA
Attendance: 365
Referees: Cathi Cornell, Shelley Nakasone, Skelly Wingard

=== Saint Mary's ===
Series History: Saint Mary's leads 39-16

Jan 18
1:00 pm PST

Recap

Loyola Marymount Lions 74, Saint Mary's Gaels 78
Scoring by half: 33-37, 41-41
| Pts: Deanna Johnson 17; Rebs: Sophie Taylor 7 Asts: Hazel Ramirez 6 | Pts: Jackie Nared 28; Rebs: Danielle Mauldin 17; Asts: Kate Gaze 4 |

McKeon Pavilion
Moraga, CA
Attendance: 442
Referees: Melissa Luna, Benny Luna, In'Fini Robinson

=== Gonzaga ===
Series History: Gonzaga leads 34-22

LMUSN

Jan 23
7:00 pm PST

Recap

Gonzaga Bulldogs 91, Loyola Marymount Lions 82 (OT)
Scoring by half: 44-31, 31-44 Overtime: 16-7
| Pts: Haiden Palmer 32; Rebs: Sunny Greinacher 10; Asts: Sunny Greiancher 4 | Pts: Deanna Johnson 25; Rebs: Emily Ben-Jumbo 10; Asts: Deanna Johnson 5 |

Gersten Pavilion
[Los Angeles, CA
Attendance: 304
Referees: Brenda Pantoja, Wanda Szeremeta, Janetta Graham

=== Portland ===
Series History: Loyola Marymount leads 34-22

Jan 25
2:00 pm PST

Recap

Portland Pilots 64, Loyola Marymount Lions 78
Scoring by half: 21-33, 43-45
| Pts: Jasmine Wooton 14; Rebs: Jasmine Wooton 7 Asts: Jasmine Wooton 3 | Pts: Deanna Johnson 20; Rebs: Emily Ben-Jumbo 13; Asts: Hazel Ramirez 11 |

Gersten Pavilion
Los Angeles, CA
Attendance: 457
Referees: Rick Showers, Bethany Graves, Cheryl Flores

=== Pepperdine ===
Series History: Pepperdine leads 50-19

Feb 1
2:00 pm PST

Recap

Pepperdine Waves 74, Loyola Marymount Lions 90
Scoring by half: 32-45, 42-45
| Pts: Allie Green 14; Rebs: Ea Shoushtari 5 Asts: Ea Shoushtari 11 | Pts: Leslie Lopez-Wood 18; Rebs: Emily Ben-Jumbo 10; Asts: Hazel Ramirez 11 |

Gersten Pavilion
Los Angeles, CA
Attendance: 302
Referees: Kyle Bacon, Alejandro Moreno, Lucy Banuelos

=== Portland ===
Series History: Loyola Marymount leads 35-22

Feb 6
2:00 pm PST

Recap

Loyola Marymount Lions 66, Portland Pilots 84
Scoring by half: 33-41, 33-43
| Pts: Hazel Ramirez 21; Rebs: Mackenzie Kerins 25; Asts: Hazel Ramirez 6 | Pts: Jasmine Wooton 21; Rebs: Cassandra Thompson 8 Asts: Jasmine Wooton & Amy Pupa 5 |

Chiles Center
Portland, OR
Attendance: 241
Referees: Shelley Russi, Richard Waters, Tiffany Bird

=== Gonzaga ===
Series History: Gonzaga leads 35-22
Broadcasters: Greg Heister and Stephanie Hawk Freeman

SWX

Feb 8
2:00 pm PST

Recap

Loyola Marymount Lions 51, Gonzaga Bulldogs 88
Scoring by half: 20-46, 31-42
| Pts: Taylor Anderson 11; Rebs: MacKenzie Kerins 5 Asts: Hazel Ramirez 4 | Pts: Haiden Palmer 27; Rebs: Shelby Cheslek 7 Asts: Haiden Palmer 7 |

McCarthey Athletic Center
Spokane, WA
Attendance: 5,739
Referees: Rick Showers, Bart Baldwin, Benny Luna

=== Saint Mary's ===
Series History: Saint Mary's leads 40-16

Feb 13
7:00 pm PST

Recap

Saint Mary's Gaels 74, Loyola Marymount Lions 76 (OT)
Scoring by half: 42-29, 28-41 Overtime: 4-6
| Pts: Jackie Nared 25; Rebs: Danielle Mauldin 19; Asts: Kate Gaze 7 | Pts: Hazel Ramirez 17; Rebs: Mackenzie Kerins 12; Asts: Hazel Ramirez 11 |

Gersten Pavilion
Los Angeles, CA
Attendance: 312
Referees: Lisa Jones, Darren Krzesnik, Skelly Wingard

=== Pacific ===
Series History: Pacific leads series 2-0

Feb 15
2:00 pm PST

Recap

Pacific Tigers 102, Loyola Marymount Lions 95
Scoring by half: 41-35, 61-60
| Pts: Madison Parrish 28; Rebs: Kendall Kenyon 13; Asts: Madison Parrish 5 | Pts: Mackenzie Kerins 21; Rebs: Emily Ben-Jumbo & Mackenzie Kerins 9 Asts: Hazel Ramirez 12 |

Gersten Pavilion
Los Angeles, CA
Attendance: 468
Referees: Lucy Banuelos, Teresa Turner, Janetta Graham

=== San Diego ===
Series History: San Diego leads 39-27

LMUSN

Feb 19
7:00 pm PST

Recap

San Diego Toreros 87, Loyola Marymount Lions 74
Scoring by half: 40-36, 47-38
| Pts: Amy Kame 31; Rebs: Kameron Knutson 12; Asts: Amy Kame 6 | Pts: Deanna Johnson 26; Rebs: Mackenzie Kerins 11; Asts: Hazel Ramirez 10 |

Gersten Pavilion
Los Angeles, CA
Attendance: 367
Referees: Michol Murray, Wanda Szeremeta, Rigoberto Vasquez

=== BYU ===
Series History: BYU leads series 7-1

LMUSN

Feb 22
2:00 pm PST

BYU Cougars 91, Loyola Marymount Lions 67
Scoring by half: 56-29, 35-38
| Pts: Kim Beeston 27; Rebs: Jennifer Hamson 19; Asts: Kim Beeston 9 | Pts: Deanna Johnson 23; Rebs: Emily Ben-Jumbo 10; Asts: Hazel Ramirez, Leslie Lopez-Wood, Deanna Johnson, & Taylor Anderson 2 |

Gersten Pavilion
Los Angeles, CA
Attendance: 438
Referees: Bart Baldwin, Alecia Murray, Gordon Torigoe

=== Santa Clara ===
Series History: Santa Clara leads 44-20

Feb 27
7:00 pm PST

Recap

Loyola Marymount Lions 88, Santa Clara Broncos 74
Scoring by half: 35-31, 53-43
| Pts: Hazel Ramirez 21; Rebs: Mackenzie Kerins 14; Asts: Hazel Ramirez 9 | Pts: Nici Gilday 40; Rebs: Marie Bertholdt & Jo Paine 9 Asts: Montana Walters 9 |

Leavey Center
Santa Clara, CA
Attendance: 375
Referees: Marianne Karp, Teresa Turner, Cheryl Flores

== Rankings ==
| + Regular season polls | Poll | Pre- Season | Week 1 | Week 2 | Week 3 | Week 4 | Week 5 | Week 6 | Week 7 | Week 8 | Week 9 | Week 10 | Week 11 | Week 12 | Week 13 | Week 14 | Week 15 | Week 16 | Week 17 | Week 18 | Final |
| AP | | | | | | | | | | | | | | | | | | | | | |
| Coaches | | | | | | | | | | | | | | | | | | | | | |

Legend
| | Increase in ranking |
| | Decrease in ranking |
| | No change |
| (RV) | Received votes |
| (NR) | Not ranked |

== See also ==
- Loyola Marymount Lions women's basketball
