= 2013–14 Utah State Aggies women's basketball team =

Intercollegiate basketball season

2013–14 Utah State Aggies women's basketball
- Conference: Mountain West Conference
- Record: 15–16 (8–10 Mountain West)
- Head coach: Jerry Finkbeiner (2nd season)
- Assistant coaches: Crystal Robinson (1st season); Stu Sells (3rd season); Micha Thompson (2nd season)
- Home arena: Smith Spectrum

2013–14 Mountain West Conference women's basketball standings
	Conf.				Overall
Team	W		L	PCT	W		L	PCT
Colorado State	15	–	3	.833	25	–	8	.758
Fresno State†	13	–	5	.722	22	–	11	.667
Nevada	12	–	6	.667	18	–	13	.581
Boise State	12	–	6	.667	18	–	14	.563
Wyoming	10	–	8	.556	20	–	11	.645
San Diego State	9	–	9	.500	13	–	17	.433
UNLV	9	–	9	.500	13	–	19	.406
Utah State	8	–	10	.444	15	–	16	.484
New Mexico	6	–	12	.333	11	–	19	.367
San Jose State	5	–	13	.278	11	–	19	.367
Air Force	0	–	18	.000	1	–	28	.034
† 2014 MWC tournament winner As of March 22, 2014; Rankings from AP poll

The 2013–14 Utah State Aggies women's basketball team represented Utah State University in the 2013–14 college basketball season. The Aggies, led by second year head coach Jerry Finkbeiner. The Aggies played their home games at the Smith Spectrum and were a newly member of the Mountain West Conference. They finished the season 15–16, 8–10 in Mountain West play to finish in eighth place. They advanced to the quarterfinals of the Mountain West women's tournament, where they lost to Colorado State.

== Roster ==
Number	Name	Position	Weight	Year	Hometown
2	Elsie Nelson	Guard	5–9	Junior	Springfield, Oregon
3	Jennifer Schlott	Guard	5–6	Senior	Mesa, Arizona
5	Stephanie Bairstow	Guard	6–2	Sophomore	Brisbane, Queensland, Australia
11	Shelby Cloninger	Guard	5–11	Freshman	Kamiah, Idaho
20	Mariah Miles	Guard	5–7	Sophomore	Geary, Oklahoma
21	Makenlee Williams	Guard	5–11	Sophomore	Syracuse, Utah
22	Tijana Djukic	Forward	6–4	Sophomore	Serbia
23	Elizabeth Landreth	Guard	5–10	Freshman	Meridian, Idaho
25	Lynette Johnson	Guard	5–9	Freshman	Sacramento, California
30	Jasmine Porter	Guard	6–1	Junior	Layton, Utah
32	Cristal Turner	Guard	6–2	Senior	Maidstone, England
44	Franny Vaaulu	Center	6–2	Senior	Los Angeles, California
50	Igrida Strikas	Guard	6–1	Junior	Riga, Latvia

== Schedule ==
Date time, TV	Rank^{#}	Opponent^{#}	Result	Record	Site (attendance) city, state
Exhibition
11/05/2013*; 7:00 pm, MWN		Northwest Nazarene	W 81–65	-	Smith Spectrum (776); Logan, UT
Regular Season
11/09/2013*; 7:00 pm, MWN		Black Hills State	W 103–46	1–0	Smith Spectrum (641); Logan, UT
11/13/2013*; 7:00 pm, MWN		Loyola Marymount	W 100–58	2–0	Smith Spectrum (445); Logan, UT
11/19/2013*; 7:00 pm, MWN		Utah	W 77–61	3–0	Smith Spectrum (803); Logan, UT
11/22/2013*; 7:00 pm, MWN		Idaho State	W 78–66	4–0	Smith Spectrum (802); Logan, UT
11/29/2013*; 6:00 pm, BigWest.TV		vs. Hampton; Radisson Hotel Chatsworth Thanksgiving Classic	L 88–98	4–1	Matadome (137); Northridge, CA
11/30/2013*; 6:00 pm, BigWest.TV		at Cal State Northridge; Radisson Hotel Chatsworth Thanksgiving Classic	L 67–75	5–1	Matadome (254); Northridge, CA
12/05/2013*; 6:00 pm		at South Dakota	L 71–81	5–2	DakotaDome (1,113); Vermillion, SD
12/08/2013*; 1:00 pm		at Nebraska	L 75–95	5–3	Pinnacle Bank Arena (4,494); Lincoln, NE
12/19/2013*; 8:00 pm, BigWest.TV		at UC Santa Barbara	W 81–70	6–3	UC Santa Barbara Events Center (301); Santa Barbara, CA
12/21/2013*; 2:00 pm, BYUtv		at BYU	L 74–84	6–4	Marriott Center (579); Provo, UT
12/28/2013*; 2:00 pm, MWN		College of Idaho	L 81–86	6–5	Smith Spectrum (523); Logan, UT
01/01/2014; 7:00 pm, MWN		at Air Force	W 88–78	7–5 (1–0)	Smith Spectrum (571); Logan, UT
01/04/2014; 3:00 pm, MWN		at San Jose State	W 78–65	8–5 (2–0)	San Jose State Event Center (328); San Jose, CA
01/11/2014; 7:00 pm, MWN		Nevada	L 72–76	8–6 (2–1)	Smith Spectrum (870); Logan, UT
01/15/2014; 7:00 pm, MWN		at Colorado State	L 78–88	8–7 (2–2)	Moby Arena (1,091); Ft. Collins, CO
01/18/2014; 7:00 pm, MWN		Boise State	L 68–71	8–8 (2–3)	Smith Spectrum (827); Logan, UT
01/22/2014; 7:00 pm, MWN		UNLV	L 67–73	8–9 (2–4)	Smith Spectrum (575); Logan, UT
01/25/2014; 3:00 pm, MWN		at San Diego State	L 72–88	8–10 (2–5)	Viejas Arena (552); San Diego, CA
01/29/2014; 7:00 pm, MWN		at New Mexico	W 75–69	9–10 (3–5)	The Pit (6,038); Albuquerque, NM
02/01/2014; 7:00 pm, MWN		Wyoming	W 80–75	10–10 (4–5)	Smith Spectrum (862); Logan, UT
02/05/2014; 7:30 pm, MWN		at Nevada	L 66–70	10–11 (4–6)	Lawlor Events Center (880); Reno, NV
02/08/2014; 2:00 pm, MWN		at Boise State	L 62–83	10–12 (4–7)	Taco Bell Arena (1,006); Boise, ID
02/12/2014; 7:00 pm, MWN		Colorado State	L 75–100	10–13 (4–8)	Smith Spectrum (583); Logan, UT
02/15/2014; 5:00 pm, MWN		at UNLV	L 80–82	10–14 (4–9)	Cox Pavilion (1,355); Las Vegas, NV
02/19/2014; 7:00 pm, MWN		San Diego State	W 76–69	11–14 (5–9)	Smith Spectrum (625); Logan, UT
02/22/2014; 3:00 pm, MWN		at Fresno State	L 70–72	11–15 (5–10)	Save Mart Center (2,796); Fresno, CA
02/26/2014; 7:00 pm, MWN		New Mexico	W 67–65	12–15 (6–10)	Smith Spectrum (623); Logan, UT
03/01/2014; 7:00 pm, MWN		San Jose State	W 96–67	13–15 (7–10)	Smith Spectrum (901); Logan, UT
03/04/2014; 7:00 pm, MWN		at Wyoming	W 84–80	14–15 (8–10)	Arena-Auditorium (3,061); Laramie, WY
Mountain West Women's Tournament
03/10/2014; 3:00 pm, MWN		vs. New Mexico; First Round	W 69–66	15–15	Thomas & Mack Center (N/A); Paradise, NV
03/11/2014; 1:00 pm, MWN		vs. Colorado State; Quarterfinals	L 67–72	15–16	Thomas & Mack Center (N/A); Paradise, NV
*Non-conference game. ^{#}Rankings from AP Poll. (#) Tournament seedings in parentheses. All times are in Mountain Time. All dates, times and TV are tentative and subject to change.

== See also ==
- 2013–14 Utah State Aggies men's basketball team
