= 2013–14 BYU Cougars women's basketball team =

Intercollegiate basketball season

2013–14 BYU Cougars women's basketball

NCAA, Sweet Sixteen, L UConn 51–70
- Conference: West Coast Conference

Ranking
- Coaches: No. 18
- AP: No. RV
- Record: 28–7 (14–4 WCC)
- Head coach: Jeff Judkins (13th season)
- Assistant coaches: Melinda Bendall (3rd season); Ray Stewart (3rd season); Dan Nielson (1st season)
- Home arena: Marriott Center

2013–14 West Coast Conference women's basketball standings
	Conf.				Overall
Team	W		L	PCT	W		L	PCT
No. 18 Gonzaga†	16	–	2	.889	29	–	5	.853
BYU	14	–	4	.778	28	–	7	.800
Pacific	12	–	6	.667	18	–	13	.581
Saint Mary's	11	–	7	.611	23	–	10	.697
San Diego	11	–	7	.611	24	–	9	.727
Portland	7	–	11	.389	14	–	16	.467
Santa Clara	6	–	12	.333	10	–	20	.333
San Francisco	6	–	12	.333	12	–	19	.387
Loyola Marymount	6	–	12	.333	9	–	21	.300
Pepperdine	1	–	17	.056	6	–	25	.194
† 2014 WCC tournament winner As of March 29, 2014; Rankings from AP Poll

The 2013–14 BYU Cougars women's basketball team represented Brigham Young University during the 2013–14 college basketball season. It was head coach Jeff Judkins thirteenth season at BYU. The Cougars, members of the West Coast Conference, played their home games at the Marriott Center. The Cougars placed second in both the regular season and the conference tournament. They qualified for the NCAA Tournament where they became the only team to lead UConn in the second half of a game during the season before their Sweet Sixteen departure.

== Before the season ==
=== Departures ===
Name	Number	Pos.	Height	Year	Hometown	Notes
Haley Steed	33	G	5'4"	Super Senior (6th year)	Syracuse, Utah	Graduated
Keilani Unga	41	F	6'2"	Senior	Warrenville, Illinois	Graduated

=== Recruiting ===
As early recruiting began, BYU had 3 players commit to play.

Name	Pos.	Height	Hometown	High School	Notes
Cassie Broadhead	G	5'9"	Glenville, New York	Scotia-Glenville High School	She's a three-time Foothills Council MVP and a four-time Foothills Council First Team honoree. Her team has won the Foothill Council Championship the last three years. Broadhead has garnered three straight NBC News Channel 13 All-Star honors, has been named a Gazette Newspaper First Team All-Area recipient three straight times and has picked up two Second Team All-State Class A awards.
Amy Harris	G	5'9"	Santa Clara, Utah	Snow Canyon	Harris is a three-year letterwinner at Snow Canyon High School where she's averaged 12.2 points, 3.7 rebounds and 1.7 assists per game. The 5-foot-9 guard was named an Adidas All-American (only 100 girls each year receive such honor). She helped guide Snow Canyon to a 3A girls' basketball 2012 championship where she was named the tournament's MVP. Harris has also played on the Salt Lake Metro Basketball Club team.
Kalani Purcell	F	6'2"	Hamilton, New Zealand	John Paul College	Purcell, a 6-foot-2 forward, has played on the Queensland U18 team that has won three-straight Australian State Championship silver medals. In 2009 she was on the New Zealand U17 national team. Purcell, a native of New Zealand, prepped at John Paul College High School that won back-to-back national championships. The team is currently in Melbourne defending its title. In 2012 she received an invitation to try out for the New Zealand Tall Ferns, the national team, and she has also played for the New Zealand Force Cougars.

== 2013–14 media ==
=== BYU Radio Sports Network Affiliates ===
All Lady Cougar games that didn't conflict with men's basketball or football games were featured live on BYU Radio found nationwide on Dish Network 980, on Sirius XM 143, and online at www.byuradio.org.

== Roster ==
2013–14 BYU Cougars women's basketball team
Players
Coaches

Pos.	#	Name	Height	Year	Previous school	Hometown
G	1	Carly Stratton	5 ft 7 in (1.7 m)	So	Hurricane	St. George, UT
G	2	Amy Harris	5 ft 9 in (1.75 m)	Fr	Snow Canyon	Santa Clara, UT
G	3	Ashley Garfield	5 ft 10 in (1.78 m)	Jr	Morgan	Morgan, UT
G	4	Kim Beeston	5 ft 11 in (1.8 m)	RS Sr	Wasatch	Heber, UT
C	5	Jennifer Hamson	6 ft 7 in (2.01 m)	Sr	Pleasant Grove	Lindon, UT
G	11	Xojian Harry	5 ft 11 in (1.8 m)	Jr	Viewmont	Bountiful, UT
G	12	Stephanie Rovetti	5 ft 6 in (1.68 m)	RS Jr	Reno	Reno, NV
G	15	Kylie Maeda	5 ft 5 in (1.65 m)	So	Iolani	Honolulu, HI
G	20	Cassie Broadhead	5 ft 8 in (1.73 m)	Fr	Scotia Glenville	Glenville, NY
G	21	Lexi Eaton	5 ft 10 in (1.78 m)	So	Springville	Mapleton, UT
G/F	22	Kristine Fuller	5 ft 11 in (1.8 m)	RS Fr	Palm Harbor University	Crystal Beach, FL
G	23	Makenzi Morrison	5 ft 8 in (1.73 m)	RS Fr	Alta	Draper, UT
F	34	Micaelee Orton	6 ft 2 in (1.88 m)	RS Fr	Kearns	Kearns, UT
F	41	Morgan Bailey	6 ft 2 in (1.88 m)	RS Jr	Timpanogos	Orem, UT
C	42	Savannah Irwin	6 ft 5 in (1.96 m)	Fr	La Costa Canyon	Carlsbad, CA

Head coach

- Jeff Judkins (Utah)

Assistant coach(es)

- Melinda Bendall (BYU)
- Ray Stewart (Utah Valley)
- Dan Nielson (BYU)
- Haley Steed- Director of Operations (BYU)

Legend

- (C) Team captain
- (S) Suspended
- (I) Ineligible
- (W) Walk-on
- Injured
- Current redshirt

Roster
Last update: 2013-09-01

== Schedule ==
The conference schedule increased from 16 to 18 games with the addition of Pacific. The new schedule featured a travel format scenario where you will play on the road or at home for 2 consecutive games, typically on Thursday and Saturday with the following travel partners: BYU and San Diego, Pacific and Saint Mary's, Santa Clara and San Francisco, Loyola Marymount and Pepperdine, and Gonzaga and Portland.

Date time, TV	Rank^{#}	Opponent^{#}	Result	Record	Site city, state
Exhibition
11/01/2013*; 7:00 pm		Colorado Mesa	W 70–66	-	Marriott Center; Provo, UT
11/02/2013*; 3:00 pm		Westminster College	W 72–60	-	Marriott Center; Provo, UT
Regular Season
11/08/2013*; 3:00 pm, BYUtv		South Dakota State	W 81–53	1–0	Marriott Center; Provo, UT
11/12/2013*; 5:00 pm, MW Net		at UNLV	W 71–64	2–0	Thomas and Mack Center; Las Vegas, NV
11/16/2013*; 4:00 pm		Boston College	W 70–69 ^{OT}	3–0	Marriott Center; Provo, UT
11/23/2013*; 5:00 pm, BigWest.TV		at Cal State Northridge	W 82–66	4–0	Matadome; Northridge, CA
11/26/2013*; 7:00 pm, BYUtv		Washington State	W 80–73	5–0	Marriott Center; Provo, UT
11/30/2013*; 2:00 pm, BYUtv		Arizona	W 59–52	6–0	Marriott Center; Provo, UT
12/04/2013*; 7:30 pm, MW Net		at Nevada	W 69–61	7–0	Lawlor Events Center; Reno, NV
12/07/2013*; 1:00 pm, Jays All Access		at Creighton	W 52–51	8–0	D. J. Sokol Arena; Omaha, NE
12/10/2013*; 7:00 pm, Watch Big Sky		at Weber State	W 90–85	9–0	Dee Events Center; Ogden, UT
12/14/2013*; 2:00 pm, BYUtv		Utah; Deseret First Duel	L 74–82 ^{2OT}	9–1	Marriott Center; Provo, UT
12/21/2013*; 2:00 pm, BYUtv		Utah State	W 84–74	10–1	Marriott Center; Provo, UT
12/28/2013; 2:00 pm, BYUtv		Loyola Marymount	W 90–72	11–1 (1–0)	Marriott Center; Provo, UT
12/30/2013; 5:00 pm, BYUtv		Pepperdine	W 65–50	12–1 (2–0)	Marriott Center; Provo, UT
01/02/2014; 7:00 pm, BYUtv		Pacific	L 62–75	12–2 (2–1)	Marriott Center; Provo, UT
01/04/2014; 2:00 pm, BYUtv		Saint Mary's	W 69–67 ^{OT}	13–2 (3–1)	Marriott Center; Provo, UT
01/09/2014; 7:00 pm, SWX		at Gonzaga	L 42–68	13–3 (3–2)	McCarthey Athletic Center; Spokane, WA
01/11/2014; 3:00 pm, Pilots TV		at Portland	W 76–68	14–3 (4–2)	Chiles Center; Portland, OR
01/18/2014; 3:00 pm, TheW.tv		at San Diego	L 45–60	14–4 (4–3)	Jenny Craig Pavilion; San Diego, CA
01/23/2014; 7:00 pm, BYUtv		San Francisco	W 81–47	15–4 (5–3)	Marriott Center; Provo, UT
01/25/2014; 2:00 pm, BYUtv		Santa Clara	W 61–44	16–4 (6–3)	Marriott Center; Provo, UT
01/30/2014; 7:00 pm, TheW.tv		at Saint Mary's	L 70–75	16–5 (6–4)	McKeon Pavilion; Moraga, CA
02/01/2014; 3:00 pm, TheW.tv		at Pacific	W 88–57	17–5 (7–4)	Alex G. Spanos Center; Stockton, CA
02/06/2014; 8:00 pm, Santa Clara TV		at Santa Clara	W 87–80 ^{OT}	18–5 (8–4)	Leavey Center; Santa Clara, UT
02/08/2014; 2:00 pm, USF TV		at San Francisco	W 73–66	19–5 (9–4)	War Memorial Gymnasium; San Francisco, CA
02/13/2014; 7:00 pm, BYUtv		Portland	W 67–43	20–5 (10–4)	Marriott Center; Provo, UT
02/15/2014; 2:00 pm, BYUtv		No. 20 Gonzaga	W 62–52	21–5 (11–4)	Marriott Center; Provo, UT
02/20/2014; 8:00 pm, TV-32		at Pepperdine	W 89–75	22–5 (12–4)	Firestone Fieldhouse; Malibu, CA
02/22/2014; 3:00 pm, LMUSN		at Loyola Marymount	W 91–67	23–5 (13–4)	Gersten Pavilion; Los Angeles, CA
03/01/2014; 1:00 pm, BYUtv		San Diego	W 71–58	24–5 (14–4)	Marriott Center; Provo, UT
2014 WCC Tournament
03/07/2014; 3:00 pm, BYUtv		vs. Pepperdine; WCC Quarterfinals	W 77–51	25–5	Orleans Arena; Paradise, NV
03/10/2014; 3:00 pm, BYUtv		vs. Pacific; Semifinals	W 77–64	26–5	Orleans Arena; Paradise, NV
03/11/2014; 2:00 pm, ESPNU		vs. No. 18 Gonzaga; Championship	L 57–71	26–6	Orleans Arena; Paradise, NV
2014 NCAA Tournament
03/22/2014; 4:30 pm, ESPN2/ESPN3		vs. No. 16 NC State; NCAA 1st Round	W 72–57	27–6	Pauley Pavilion; Los Angeles, CA
03/24/2014; 7:00 pm, ESPN2/ESPN3		vs. No. 13 Nebraska; NCAA 2nd Round	W 80–76	28–6	Pauley Pavilion; Los Angeles, CA
03/29/2014; 2:30 pm, ESPN		vs. No. 1 Connecticut; NCAA Sweet Sixteen	L 51–70	28–7	Pinnacle Bank Arena; Lincoln, NE
*Non-conference game. ^{#}Rankings from AP Poll. (#) Tournament seedings in parentheses. All times are in Mountain Time.

== Game summaries ==
=== Exhibition: Colorado Mesa ===
Nov 1
7:05 pm MST

Recap

Colorado Mesa Mavericks 66, BYU Cougars 70
Scoring by half: 37-28, 29-42
Pts: Sharaya Selsor 24; Rebs: Aubry Boehme 6 Asts: Christen Lopez 6	Pts: Jennifer Hamson 25; Rebs: Jennifer Hamson 13; Asts: Stephanie Rovetti 6

Marriott Center
Provo, UT
Attendance: 540
Referees: Rick Showers, Kyle Bacon, Tiffany Bird

=== Exhibition: Westminster College ===
Nov 2
3:00 pm MST

Recap

Westminster Griffins 60, BYU Cougars 72
Scoring by half: 34-39, 26-33
Pts: Kelsi Wells 16; Rebs: Alli Blake, Tia Pappas & Amanda Hacking 5 Asts: Kelsi Wells & Amy Krommenhoek 3	Pts: Jennifer Hamson 20; Rebs: Jennifer Hamson 11; Asts: Stephanie Rovetti 6

Marriott Center
Provo, UT
Attendance: 459
Referees: Cathi Comell, Michol Murray, In'Fini Robinson

=== South Dakota State ===
Series History: First Meeting
Broadcasters: Spencer Linton, Kristen Kozlowski & Skyler Hardman

BYUtv

Nov 8
3:05 pm MST

Recap

South Dakota State Jackrabbits 53, BYU Cougars 81
Scoring by half: 25-41, 28-40
Pts: Megan Waytashek 12; Rebs: Clarissa Ober 5 Asts: Gabby Boever 3	Pts: Kim Beeston 18; Rebs: Jennifer Hamson 10; Asts: Kim Beeston 5

Marriott Center
Provo, UT
Attendance: 648
Referees: Jeff Cross, Rachel Monroe, Erika Herriman

=== UNLV ===
Series History: BYU leads series 27-12
Broadcasters: Adam Candee, Dominique Harris & Jesse Vineyard

MW Net

Nov 12
4:00 pm PST

Recap

BYU Cougars 71, UNLV Lady Rebels 64
Scoring by half: 33-26, 38-38
Pts: Jennifer Hamson & Xojian Harry 13; Rebs: Morgan Bailey 10; Asts: Kim Beeston 6	Pts: Mia Bell 23; Rebs: Rejane Verin & Aley Rohde 7 Asts: Danielle Miller 4

Thomas & Mack Center
Las Vegas, NV
Attendance: N/A
Referees: Melissa Barlow, Scotty Hermann, James Stevens

=== Boston College ===
Series History: Boston College leads series 1-0

Nov 16
4:05 pm MST

Recap

Boston College Eagles 69, BYU Cougars 70 (OT)
Scoring by half: 34-32, 26-28 Overtime: 9-10
Pts: Nicole Boudreau 23; Rebs: Kristen Doherty 12; Asts: Lauren Engeln & Kristen Doherty 4	Pts: Jennifer Hamson 28; Rebs: Morgan Bailey 14; Asts: Stephanie Rovetti 6

Marriott Center
Provo, UT
Attendance: 703
Referees: Brenda Pantoja, Cheryl Flores, L. Renee Robinson

=== Cal State Northridge ===
Series History: BYU leads 3-0
Broadcasters: Ryan Stanbury and Rheina Ale

BigWest.tv

Nov 23
4:00 pm PST

Recap

BYU Cougars 82, Cal State Northridge Matadors 66
Scoring by half: 43-37, 39-29
Pts: Jennifer Hamson 24; Rebs: Jennifer Hamson 11; Asts: Stephanie Rovetti 6	Pts: Cinnamon Lister 20; Rebs: Camille Mahlknecht 5 Asts: Janae Sharpe 5

Matadome
Northridge, CA
Attendance: 320
Referees: Clifford Sims Sr, Alecia Murray, Brandon Self

=== Washington State ===
Series History: Series even 4-4
Broadcasters: Spencer Linton, Kristen Kozlowski & Skyler Hardman

BYUtv

Nov 26
8:00 pm MST

Recap

Washington State Cougars 73, BYU Cougars 80
Scoring by half: 32-37, 41-43
Pts: Lia Galdeira 15; Rebs: Sage Romberg 9 Asts: Lia Galderia 4	Pts: Lexi Eaton 27; Rebs: Lexi Eaton 9 Asts: Kim Beeston 7

Marriott Center
Provo, UT
Attendance: 432
Referees: Charles Gonzales, Cathi Cornell, Gordon Torigoe

=== Arizona ===
Series History: BYU leads 6-4
Broadcasters: Ty Brandenburg and Kristen Kozlowski

BYUtv

Nov 30
3:00 pm MST

Recap

Arizona Wildcats 56, BYU Cougars 64
Scoring by half: 33-34, 23-30
Pts: Kama Griffitts & Candice Warthen 14; Rebs: Breanna Workman 8 Asts: Candice Warthen 5	Pts: Jennifer Hamson & Morgan Bailey 18; Rebs: Jennifer Hamson 16; Asts: Kylie Maeda 5

Marriott Center
Provo, UT
Attendance: 576
Referees: Rick Showers, Tiffany Jump, Julie Vanni

=== Nevada ===
Series History: BYU leads 6-1
Broadcaster: Don Marchand

MW Net

Dec 3
6:30 pm PST

Recap

BYU Cougars 69, Nevada Wolf Pack 61
Scoring by half: 34-32, 35-29
Pts: Lexi Eaton 24; Rebs: Morgan Bailey 11; Asts: Lexi Eaton & Stephanie Rovetti 4	Pts: Terilyn Moe 19; Rebs: Aja Johnson 11; Asts: Aja Johnson 3

Lawlor Events Center
Reno, NV
Attendance: 736
Referees: Melissa Barlow, Michael Price, Bob Scofield

=== Creighton ===
Series History: Series tied 6-6
Broadcasters: Brad Burwell and Rob Simms

Jays All Access

Dec 7
2:05 pm CST

Recap

BYU Cougars 52, Creighton Bluejays 51
Scoring by half: 31-22, 21-29
Pts: Jennifer Hamson 20; Rebs: Jennifer Hamson 13; Asts: Stephanie Rovetti 3	Pts: Marissa Janning 20; Rebs: Sarah Nelson 9 Asts: Sarah Nelson 3

D. J. Sokol Arena
Omaha, NE
Attendance: 642
Referees: Wesley Dean, Doug Knight, Ann Schroeder

=== Weber State ===
Series History: BYU leads 40-9
Broadcasters: Tyson Ewing and Brandon Garside

Watch Big Sky

Dec 10
7:05 pm MST

Recap

BYU Cougars 90, Weber State Wildcats 85
Scoring by half: 38-56, 52-29
Pts: Lexi Eaton 25; Rebs: Jennifer Hamson 11; Asts: Kim Beeston & Ashley Garfield 5	Pts: Jalen Carpenter 20; Rebs: Amanda Hughes 9 Asts: Desiree Ramos 8

Dee Events Center
Ogden, UT
Attendance: 855
Referees: Darla Foutz, Lisa Jones, Julie Krommenhoek

=== Utah ===
Series History: Utah leads series 61-40
Broadcasters: Dave McCann, Kristen Kozlowski & Spencer Linton

BYUtv

Dec 14
2:05 pm MST

Recap

Utah Utes 82, BYU Cougars 74 (OT)
Scoring by half: 33-34, 29-28 Overtime: 5-5, 15-7
Pts: Michelle Plouffe 24; Rebs: Michelle Plouffe 13; Asts: Danielle Rodriguez 7	Pts: Lexi Eaton 20; Rebs: Jennifer Hamson 12; Asts: Lexi Eaton 5

Marriott Center
Provo, UT
Attendance: 1,070
Referees: Marianne Karp, Shelley Nakasone, Tiffany Bird

=== Utah State ===
Series History: BYU leads 31-3
Broadcasters: Spencer Linton, Kristen Kozlowski & Jake Edmonds

BYUtv

Dec 21
2:05 pm MST

Recap

Utah State Aggies 74, BYU Cougars 84
Scoring by half: 41-46, 33-38
Pts: Jennifer Scholtt 22; Rebs: Franny Vaaulu 9 Asts: Elise Nelson & Jennifer Scholott 4	Pts: Jennifer Hamson 24; Rebs: Ashley Garfield 15; Asts: Ashley Garfield 7

Marriott Center
Provo, UT
Attendance: 579
Referees: Michelle Russi, Bethany Graves, Rigoberto Vasquez

=== Loyola Marymount ===
Series History: BYU leads series 6-1
Broadcasters: Spencer Linton and Kristen Kozlowski

BYUtv

Dec 28
2:05 pm MST

Recap

Loyola Marymount Lions 72, BYU Cougars 90
Scoring by half: 36-46, 36-44
Pts: Deanna Johnson 18; Rebs: Sophie Taylor & MacKenzie Kerins 6 Asts: Hazel Ramirez 3	Pts: Jennifer Hamson 31; Rebs: Ashley Garfield 14; Asts: Kylie Maeda 7

Marriott Center
Provo, UT
Attendance: 755
Referees: Anita Ortega, Cheryl Flores, Richard Waters

=== Pepperdine ===
Series History: BYU leads 5-2
Broadcasters: Spencer Linton, Kristen Kozlowski & Andy Boyce

BYUtv

Dec 30
5:05 pm MST

Recap

Pepperdine Waves 50, BYU Cougars 65
Scoring by half: 30-31, 20-34
Pts: Allie Green 19; Rebs: Ea Shoushtari 8 Asts: Keita Wallace 6	Pts: Lexi Eaton 18; Rebs: Jennifer Hamson 13; Asts: Kylie Maeda 5

Marriott Center
Provo, UT
Attendance: 639
Referees: Karen Lasuik, Alex Carroll, Bethany Graves

=== Pacific ===
Series History: BYU leads series 5-1
Broadcasters: Spencer Linton, Jarom Jordan & Andy Boyce

BYUtv

Jan 2
7:05 pm MST

Recap

Pacific Tigers 75, BYU Cougars 62
Scoring by half: 38-29, 37-33
Pts: Sam Pettinger 16; Rebs: Erin Butler 6 Asts: Maddison Parrish 9	Pts: Jennifer Hamson 22; Rebs: Ashley Garfield 15; Asts: Kim Beeston & Ashley Garfield 4

Marriott Center
Provo, UT
Attendance: 455
Referees: Robert Scofield, Rick Showers, Lisa Ulmer

=== Saint Mary's ===
Series History: Saint Mary's leads 3-2
Broadcasters: Spencer Linton, Kristen Kozlowski & Andy Boyce

BYUtv

Jan 4
2:05 pm MST

Recap

Saint Mary's Gaels 67, BYU Cougars 69 (OT)
Scoring by half: 32-28, 30-34 Overtime: 5-7
Pts: Jackie Nared 26; Rebs: Carli Rosenthal & Danielle Mauldin 11; Asts: Kate Gaze 4	Pts: Lexi Eaton 19; Rebs: Jennifer Hamson & Lexi Eaton 10; Asts: Kylie Maeda & Lexi Eaton 4

Marriott Center
Provo, UT
Attendance: 649
Referees: Darren Krzesnik, Shelley Nakasone, In'Fini Robinson

=== Gonzaga ===
Series History: Gonzaga leads series 7-5
Broadcasters: Greg Heister and Stephanie Hawk Freeman

SWX

Jan 9
6:00 pm PST

Recap

BYU Cougars 42, Gonzaga Bulldogs 68
Scoring by half: 21-32, 21-36
Pts: Lexi Eaton 18; Rebs: Ashley Garfield 8 Asts: Kylie Maeda 3	Pts: Sunny Greinacher 20; Rebs: Sunny Greinacher & Kiara Kurdon 7 Asts: Haiden Palmer & Jazmine Redmon 4

McCarthey Athletic Center
Spokane, WA
Attendance: 5,424
Referees: Michelle Russi, Benito Luna, Alejandro Moreno

=== Portland ===
Series History: BYU leads series 12-4
Broadcaster: Cody Barton

Pilots TV

Jan 11
2:00 pm PST

Recap

BYU Cougars 75, Portland Pilots 68
Scoring by half: 43-29, 32-39
Pts: Jennifer Hamson 21; Rebs: Jennifer Hamson 11; Asts: Kylie Maeda 7	Pts: Cassandra Thompson 19; Rebs: Amy Pupa 9 Asts: Jasmine Wooton & Amy Pupa 3

Chiles Center
Portland, OR
Attendance: 401
Referees: Anita Ortega, Bart Baldwin, Cheryl Blue

=== San Diego ===
Series History: BYU leads 6-0
Broadcasters: Justin Alderson and Tracy Warren

TheW.tv

Jan 18
7:00 pm PST

Recap

BYU Cougars 45, San Diego Toreros 60
Scoring by half: 28-26, 17-34
Pts: Lexi Eaton 16; Rebs: Jennifer Hamson 17; Asts: Lexi Eaton 2	Pts: Amy Kame 23; Rebs: Amy Kame 8 Asts: Brooke Jelniker, Amy Kame, & Sophia Ederaine 2

Jenny Craig Pavilion
San Diego, CA
Attendance: 369
Referees: Richard Waters, Darren Krzesnik, Janetta Graham

=== San Francisco ===
Series History: BYU leads series 8-2
Broadcasters: Spencer Linton, Kristen Kozlowski & Andy Boyce

BYUtv

Jan 23
7:05 pm MST

Recap

San Francisco Dons 47, BYU Cougars 81
Scoring by half: 21-32, 21-36
Pts: Zhane Dikes 18; Rebs: Taylor Proctor 9 Asts: Aundrea Gordon & Taylor Proctor 2	Pts: Lexi Eaton 23; Rebs: Jennifer Hamson 17; Asts: Kim Beeston 10

Marriott Center
Provo, UT
Attendance: 620
Referees: Melissa Barlow, Anita Ortega, L. Renee Robinson

=== Santa Clara ===
Series History: BYU leads 6-1
Broadcasters: Spencer Linton, Kristen Kozlowski & Andy Boyce

BYUtv

Jan 25
2:05 pm MST

Recap

Santa Clara Broncos 44, BYU Cougars 61
Scoring by half: 19-33, 25-28
Pts: Rici Radanovich 16; Rebs: Marie Bertholdt 7 Asts: Montana Walters 3	Pts: Morgan Bailey 18; Rebs: Morgan Bailey & Ashley Garfield 13; Asts: Ashley Garfield 3

Marriott Center
Provo, UT
Attendance: 770
Referees: Brian Woods, Alejandro Moreno, Lisa Ulmer

=== Saint Mary's ===
Series History: Series even 3-3
Broadcasters: George Devine and Mary Hile-Nepfel

TheW.tv

Jan 30
6:00 pm PST

Recap

BYU Cougars 70, Saint Mary's Gaels 75
Scoring by half: 30-36, 40-39
Pts: Lexi Eaton 28; Rebs: Jennifer Hamson 10; Asts: Lexi Eaton & Kylie Maeda 3	Pts: Kate Gaze 15; Rebs: Danielle Mauldin 13; Asts: Jackie Nared 5

McKeon Pavilion
Moraga, CA
Attendance: 264
Referees: Robert Scofield, Richard Waters, Paul Patterson

=== Pacific ===
Series History: BYU leads 5-2
Broadcaster: Don Gubbins

TheW.tv

Feb 1
2:05 pm PST

Recap

BYU Cougars 88, Pacific Tigers 57
Scoring by half: 43-33, 45-24
Pts: Jennifer Hamson 25; Rebs: Jennifer Hamson 18; Asts: Kylie Maeda 7	Pts: Kiki Moore 17; Rebs: Kendall Kenyon 8 Asts: Sam Pettinger 4

Alex G. Spanos Center
Stockton, CA
Attendance: 583
Referees: Anita Ortega, Alex Carroll, Kenneth Nash

=== Santa Clara ===
Series History: BYU leads series 7-1
Broadcaster: Doug Greenwald

Broncos TV

Feb 6
7:00 pm PST

Recap

BYU Cougars 87, Santa Clara Broncos 80 (OT)
Scoring by half: 30-40, 44-34 Overtime: 13-6
Pts: Lexi Eaton 31; Rebs: Jennifer Hamson 18; Asts: Kim Beeston 5	Pts: Nici Gilday 29; Rebs: Marie Bertholdt, Jo Paine, & Vanessa Leo 5 Asts: Jo Paine 5

Leavey Center
Santa Clara, CA
Attendance: N/A
Referees: Wanda Szermeta, Cheryl Flores, Bart Baldwin

=== San Francisco ===
Series History: BYU leads 9-2
Broadcaster: Joe Castellano

Dons TV

Feb 8
2:00 pm PST

Recap

BYU Cougars 73, San Francisco Dons 66
Scoring by half: 33-33, 40-33
Pts: Jennifer Hamson 25; Rebs: Jennifer Hamson 13; Asts: Kylie Maeda 5	Pts: Paige Spietz 18; Rebs: Paige Spietz 12; Asts: Zhane Dikes, Taj Winston, Alexa Hardick, Taylor Proctor, & Aundrea Gordon 2

War Memorial Gymnasium
San Francisco, CA
Attendance: 346
Referees: Cathi Cornell, Lucy Banuelos, Steve Belnap

=== Portland ===
Series History: BYU leads series 13-4
Broadcasters: Spencer Linton, Kristen Kozlowski & Jake Edmonds

BYUtv

Feb 13
7:05 pm MST

Recap

Portland Pilots 43, BYU Cougars 67
Scoring by half: 23-26, 20-41
Pts: Jasmine Wooton 11; Rebs: Amy Pupa 10; Asts: Jasmine Wooton 4	Pts: Jennifer Hamson 27; Rebs: Jennifer Hamson 13; Asts: Kim Beeston 5

Marriott Center
Provo, UT
Attendance: 695
Referees: Karen Lasuik, Michol Murray, Brian Woods

=== Gonzaga ===
Series History: Gonzaga leads series 8-5
Broadcasters: Spencer Linton, Kristen Kozlowski & Andy Boyce

BYUtv

Feb 15
2:05 pm MST

Recap

Gonzaga Bulldogs 52, BYU Cougars 62
Scoring by half: 33-27, 19-35
Pts: Jazmine Redmon 15; Rebs: Haiden Palmer 10; Asts: Haiden Palmer 3	Pts: Jennifer Hamson 20; Rebs: Lexi Eaton 10; Asts: Kim Beeston 4

Marriott Center
Provo, UT
Attendance: 978
Referees: Penny Davis, Lisa Ulmer, Kenneth Nash

=== Pepperdine ===
Series History: BYU leads 6-2
Broadcaster: Josh Perigo

TV-32

Feb 20
7:05 pm PST

Recap

BYU Cougars 89, Pepperdine Waves 75
Scoring by half: 53-33, 36-42
Pts: Lexi Eaton 25; Rebs: Jennifer Hamson 14; Asts: Kylie Maeda 7	Pts: Ea Shoushtari 23; Rebs: Ea Shoushtari 5 Asts: Ea Shoushtari 8

Firestone Fieldhouse
Malibu, CA
Attendance: 115
Referees: Rick Showers, Benito Luna, Michelle McCoy

=== Loyola Marymount ===
Series History: BYU leads series 7-1
Broadcaster: Trace Lee

LMUSN

Feb 22
2:00 pm PST

Recap

BYU Cougars 91, Loyola Marymount Lions 67
Scoring by half: 56-29, 35-38
Pts: Kim Beeston 27; Rebs: Jennifer Hamson 19; Asts: Kim Beeston 9	Pts: Deanna Johnson 23; Rebs: Emily Ben-Jumbo 10; Asts: Hazel Ramirez, Leslie Lopez-Wood, Deanna Johnson, & Taylor Anderson 2

Gersten Pavilion
Los Angeles, CA
Attendance: 438
Referees: Bart Baldwin, Alecia Murray, Gordon Torigoe

=== San Diego ===
Series History: BYU leads 6-1
Broadcasters: Spencer Linton and Kristen Kozlowski

BYUtv

Mar 1
1:05 pm MST

Recap

San Diego Toreros 58, BYU Cougars 71
Scoring by half: 22-39, 36-32
Pts: Amy Kame 16; Rebs: Sophia Ederaine 7 Asts: Alysse Barlow 5	Pts: Jennifer Hamson 21; Rebs: Jennifer Hamson 9 Asts: Kim Beeston 5

Marriott Center
Provo, UT
Attendance: 1,120
Referees: Rigo Vasquez, Bart Baldwin, Cheryll Blue

=== Pepperdine ===
Series History: BYU leads 7-2
Broadcasters: Spencer Linton and Kristen Kozlowski

BYUtv

Mar 7
2:00 pm PST

Recap

Pepperdine Waves 51, BYU Cougars 77
Scoring by half: 22-42, 29-35
Pts: Keitra Wallace 14; Rebs: Grace Leah Baughn & Allie Green 7 Asts: Ea Shoushtari 4	Pts: Lexi Eaton & Morgan Bailey 17; Rebs: Ashley Garfield 13; Asts: Kim Beeston 7

Orleans Arena
Paradise, NV
Attendance: N/A
Referees: Wanda Szeremeta, Benny Luna, Gordon Torigoe

=== Pacific ===
Series History: BYU leads 6-2
Broadcasters: Dave McCann and Blaine Fowler

BYUtv

Mar 10
2:00 pm PDT

Recap

Pacific Tigers 64, BYU Cougars 77
Scoring by half: 24-35, 40-42
Pts: Kiki Moore 26; Rebs: Sam Pettinger 9 Asts: Madison Parrish 4	Pts: Stephanie Rovetti 15; Rebs: Jennifer Hamson 8 Asts: Kim Beeston and Lexi Eaton 3

Orleans Arena
Paradise, NV
Attendance: N/A
Referees: Michelle Russi, Darren Kresnik, Brian Woods

=== Gonzaga ===
Series History: Gonzaga leads 8-6
Broadcasters: Dave Flemming and Sean Farnham

ESPNU

Mar 11
1:00 pm PDT

Recap

BYU Cougars 57, Gonzaga Bulldogs 71
Scoring by half: 14-30, 43-41
Pts: Jennifer Hamson 24; Rebs: Jennifer Hamson & Lexi Eaton 7 Asts: Kim Beeston 5	Pts: Keani Albanez 20; Rebs: Sunny Greinacher 7 Asts: Jazmine Redmon 5

Orleans Arena
Paradise, NV
Attendance: 7,898
Referees: Bob Scofield, Cathi Cornell, Michol Murray

=== NC State ===
Series History: Series even 1-1
Broadcasters: Dave Pasch and Doris Burke

ESPN2

Mar 22
3:30 pm PDT

Recap

BYU Cougars 72, NC State Wolfpack 57
Scoring by half: 33-26, 39-31
Pts: Lexi Eaton 25; Rebs: Jennifer Hamson 19; Asts: Kim Beeston & Lexi Eaton 4 Jennifer Hamson 9 blocks	Pts: Miah Spencer 16; Rebs: Kody Burke 9 Asts: Len'nique Brown 5

Pauley Pavilion
Los Angeles, CA
Attendance: 1,941
Referees: Edward Sidlasky, Luis Gonzales, Tiffany Bird

=== Nebraska ===
Series History: Nebraska leads 4-3
Broadcasters: Dave Pasch and Doris Burke

ESPN2

Mar 24
6:00 pm PDT

Recap

BYU Cougars 80, Nebraska Cornhuskers 76
Scoring by half: 41-30, 39-46
Pts: Morgan Bailey 18; Rebs: Jennifer Hamson 14; Asts: Kim Beeston 8 Jennifer Hamson 6 blocks	Pts: Tear'a Laudermill 22; Rebs: Emily Cady & Hailie Sample 10; Asts: Rachel Theriot 9

Pauley Pavilion
Los Angeles, CA
Attendance: 973
Referees: Ed Sidlasky, Marianne Karp, Gina Cross

=== Connecticut ===
Series History: Connecticut leads 2-0
Broadcasters: Pam Ward, Carolyn Peck & LaChina Robinson

ESPN

Mar 29
3:40 pm CDT

Recap

BYU Cougars 51, Connecticut Huskies 70
Scoring by half: 29-30, 22-40
Pts: Kim Beeston 16; Rebs: Jennifer Hamson 13; Asts: Kylie Maeda 4 Jennifer Hamson 6 blocks; 28 wins new record for BYU WBB	Pts: Kaleena Mosqueda-Lewis 19; Rebs: Kaleena Mosqueda-Lewis & Stefanie Dolson 13; Asts: Bria Hartley 5 UConn 20 offensive rebounds, 11 steals, 10 blocks

Pinnacle Bank Arena
Lincoln, NE
Attendance: 9,585
Referees: Bryan Brunette, Penny Davis, Bruce Morris

== Rankings ==
2013–14 NCAA Division I women's basketball rankings

Regular season polls
Poll	Pre- Season	Week 2	Week 3	Week 4	Week 5	Week 6	Week 7	Week 8	Week 9	Week 10	Week 11	Week 12	Week 13	Week 14	Week 15	Week 16	Week 17	Week 18	Week 19	Final
AP				RV	RV	RV	RV									RV	RV	RV	RV	
Coaches	RV	RV	RV	RV	RV	RV	RV	RV	RV	RV	RV	RV	RV		RV	RV	RV	RV	RV	18

Legend
	Increase in ranking
	Decrease in ranking
	No change
(RV)	Received votes
(NR)	Not ranked

== See also ==
- BYU Cougars women's basketball
