= 2013–14 UNLV Lady Rebels basketball team =

Intercollegiate basketball season

2013–14 UNLV Lady Rebels basketball
- Conference: Mountain West Conference
- Record: 13–19 (9–9 Mountain West)
- Head coach: Kathy Olivier (6th season)
- Assistant coaches: Caitlin Collier (6th season); Nikki Blue (6th season); Kalee Whipple (2nd season)
- Home arena: Thomas & Mack Center; Cox Pavilion

2013–14 Mountain West Conference women's basketball standings
	Conf.				Overall
Team	W		L	PCT	W		L	PCT
Colorado State	15	–	3	.833	25	–	8	.758
Fresno State†	13	–	5	.722	22	–	11	.667
Nevada	12	–	6	.667	18	–	13	.581
Boise State	12	–	6	.667	18	–	14	.563
Wyoming	10	–	8	.556	20	–	11	.645
San Diego State	9	–	9	.500	13	–	17	.433
UNLV	9	–	9	.500	13	–	19	.406
Utah State	8	–	10	.444	15	–	16	.484
New Mexico	6	–	12	.333	11	–	19	.367
San Jose State	5	–	13	.278	11	–	19	.367
Air Force	0	–	18	.000	1	–	28	.034
† 2014 MWC tournament winner As of March 22, 2014; Rankings from AP poll

The 2013–14 UNLV Lady Rebels basketball team represented the University of Nevada, Las Vegas during the 2013–14 NCAA Division I women's basketball season. The team was coached by Kathy Olivier, in her sixth year with the Lady Rebels. They played their home games at the Thomas & Mack Center and the Cox Pavilion on UNLV's main campus in Paradise, Nevada. They were a member of the Mountain West Conference.

== Roster ==
Number	Name	Position	Height	Year	Hometown
0	Amie Callaway	Center/Forward	6–2	Sophomore	San Diego, California
10	Rejane Verin	Forward	6–2	Sophomore	Les Abymes, Guadeloupe
14	Aley Rhode	Sophomore	6–5	Sophomore	Cave Creek, Arizona
15	Denali Murnan	Forward	5–11	Junior	Arvada, Colorado
15	Diamond Major	Forward	5–9	Freshman	Las Vegas, Nevada
21	Amanda Anderson	Guard/Forward	6–2	RS Senior	The Woodlands, Texas
22	Rmanii Haynes	Guard	5–6	Senior	Reseda, California
23	Jehiah Cook	Guard	5–5	Sophomore	Vallejo, California
24	Alana Cesarz	Forward	6–1	Junior	Delavan, Wisconsin
25	Jazmyne Bartee	Center/Forward	6–1	Freshman	Chandler, Arizona
30	Mia Bell	Guard	5–6	RS Senior	Las Vegas, Nevada
33	Briana Charles	Guard	5–6	Junior	Sacramento, California
42	Danielle Miller	Guard	5–8	Junior	San Diego, California
44	Friederike Moderegger	Center	6–2	Senior	Essen, Germany

== Schedule and results ==
Date time, TV	Rank^{#}	Opponent^{#}	Result	Record	Site (attendance) city, state
Exhibition
11/04/2013*; 7:00 pm, MWN		Concordia	W 81–43	–	Cox Pavilion (611); Paradise, NV
Regular Season
11/08/2013*; 4:30 pm, MWN		Santa Clara	W 77–70	1–0	Thomas & Mack Center (603); Paradise, NV
11/12/2013*; 4:00 pm, MWN		BYU	L 64–71	1–1	Thomas & Mack Center (524); Paradise, NV
11/17/2013*; 2:00 pm, BTN Digital		at Northwestern	L 53–57	1–2	Welsh-Ryan Arena (573); Evanston, IL
11/23/2013*; 4:00 pm, MWN		Cal State Bakersfield	W 76–74	2–2	Thomas & Mack Center (1,007); Paradise, NV
11/26/2013*; 4:45 pm, MWN		Utah	L 55–69	2–3	Thomas & Mack Center (562); Paradise, NV
11/30/2013*; 1:00 pm, MWN		Fordham; Lady Rebel Round-Up	L 63-72	2-4	Cox Pavilion (571); Paradise, NV
12/01/2013*; 1:00 pm, MWN		Charlotte; Lady Rebel Round-Up	L 75-80	2-5	Cox Pavilion (N/A); Paradise, NV
12/06/2013*; 7:00 pm, USF TV		at San Francisco	L 61–62	2–6	War Memorial Gymnasium (552); San Francisco, CA
12/14/2013*; 2:00 pm, LMUSN		at Loyola Marymount	L 67–71	2–7	Gersten Pavilion (534); Los Angeles, CA
12/19/2013*; 5:00 pm, MWN		Clemson; Duel in the Desert	L 54–63	3–7	Cox Pavilion (826); Paradise, NV
12/20/2013*; 5:00 pm, MWN		Oregon State; Duel in the Desert	L 60–68	3–8	Cox Pavilion (N/A); Paradise, NV
12/21/2013*; 7:30 pm, MWN		Creighton; Duel in the Desert	L 56–66	3–9	Cox Pavilion (862); Paradise, NV
01/01/2014; 12:00 pm, MWN		Fresno State	L 63–79	3–10 (0–1)	Cox Pavilion (664); Paradise, NV
01/04/2014; 12:00 pm, MWN		at Air Force	W 72–65	4–10 (1–1)	Clune Arena (368); Colorado Springs, CO
01/08/2014; 6:30 pm, MWN		at Nevada	W 57–49	5–10 (2–1)	Lawlor Events Center (836); Reno, NV
01/15/2014; 7:00 pm, MWN		New Mexico	W 78–56	6–10 (3–1)	Cox Pavilion (717); Paradise, NV
01/18/2014; 7:00 pm, MWN		San Diego State	W 74–59	7–10 (4–1)	Cox Pavilion (1,349); Paradise, NV
01/22/2014; 6:00 pm, MWN		at Utah State	W 73–67	8–10 (5–1)	Smith Spectrum (575); Logan, UT
01/25/2014; 2:00 pm, MWN		at Fresno State	L 52–70	8–11 (5–2)	Save Mart Center (2,534); Fresno, CA
01/29/2014; 7:00 pm, MWN		San Jose State	W 90–76	9–11 (6–2)	Cox Pavilion (716); Paradise, NV
02/01/2014; 1:00 pm, MWN		at Boise State	L 49–79	9–12 (6–3)	Taco Bell Arena (818); Boise, ID
02/05/2014; 7:00 pm, MWN		Colorado State	L 48–66	9–13 (6–4)	Cox Pavilion (1,002); Paradise, NV
02/08/2014; 1:00 pm, MWN		at Wyoming	L 56–82	9–14 (6–5)	Arena-Auditorium (3,452); Laramie, WY
02/15/2014; 4:00 pm, MWN		Utah State	W 82–80	10–14 (7–5)	Cox Pavilion (1,355); Paradise, NV
02/19/2014; 6:00 pm, MWN		at New Mexico	L 58–65	10–15 (7–6)	The Pit (6,539); Albuquerque, NM
02/22/2014; 2:00 pm, MWN		Boise State	L 72–75	10–16 (7–7)	Cox Pavilion (988); Paradise, NV
02/26/2014; 6:00 pm, MWN		at Colorado State	L 64–84	10–17 (7–8)	Moby Arena (1,626); Ft. Collins, CO
03/01/2014; 4:00 pm, MWN		Air Force	W 87–43	11–17 (8–8)	Cox Pavilion (1,001); Paradise, NV
03/04/2014; 6:00 pm, MWN		at San Diego State	L 63–64	11–18 (8–9)	Viejas Arena (627); San Diego, CA
03/07/2014; 5:00 pm, MWN		Nevada	W 80–68	12–18 (9–9)	Cox Pavilion (1,474); Paradise, NV
2014 Mountain West Conference women's basketball tournament
03/10/2014; 4:30 pm, MWN; CBSSN (Championship)	(7)	vs. (10) San Jose State; First Round	W 78–75	13–18	Thomas & Mack Center (1,836); Paradise, NV
03/11/2014; 6:00 pm, MWN; CBSSN (Championship)	(7)	vs. (2) Fresno State; Quarterfinals	L 65–80	13–19	Thomas & Mack Center; Paradise, NV
*Non-conference game. ^{#}Rankings from AP Poll. (#) Tournament seedings in parentheses. All times are in Pacific Time. All dates, times and TV are tentative and subject to change.

== See also ==
2013–14 UNLV Runnin' Rebels basketball team
