= 2013–14 Colorado State Rams women's basketball team =

Intercollegiate basketball season

2013–14 Colorado State Rams women's basketball

Mountain West Regular Season Champions

WNIT, First Round
- Conference: Mountain West Conference
- Record: 25–8 (15–3 Mountain West)
- Head coach: Ryun Williams (2nd season)
- Assistant coaches: Chad Lavin (2nd season); Tim Moser (2nd season); Mandy Koupal (2nd season)
- Home arena: Moby Arena

2013–14 Mountain West Conference women's basketball standings
	Conf.				Overall
Team	W		L	PCT	W		L	PCT
Colorado State	15	–	3	.833	25	–	8	.758
Fresno State†	13	–	5	.722	22	–	11	.667
Nevada	12	–	6	.667	18	–	13	.581
Boise State	12	–	6	.667	18	–	14	.563
Wyoming	10	–	8	.556	20	–	11	.645
San Diego State	9	–	9	.500	13	–	17	.433
UNLV	9	–	9	.500	13	–	19	.406
Utah State	8	–	10	.444	15	–	16	.484
New Mexico	6	–	12	.333	11	–	19	.367
San Jose State	5	–	13	.278	11	–	19	.367
Air Force	0	–	18	.000	1	–	28	.034
† 2014 MWC tournament winner As of March 22, 2014; Rankings from AP poll

The 2013–14 Colorado State Rams women's basketball team represented Colorado State University in the 2013–14 college basketball season. The Rams, led by second-year head coach Ryun Williams, played their home games at the Moby Arena and were members of the Mountain West Conference. They finished the season 25–8, 15–3 in Mountain West play to win the regular season championship. They advanced to the championship game of the Mountain West Conference women's basketball tournament, where they lost to Fresno State. As regular season champions who failed to win their conference tournament, they received an automatic bid to the Women's National Invitation Tournament, where they lost in the first round to Southern Utah.

== Roster ==
Number	Name	Position	Weight	Year	Hometown
0	AJ Newton	Guard	5–3	Junior	San Jose, California
1	Victoria Wells	Guard/forward	5-10	Junior	Los Angeles, California
2	Stine Austgulen	Guard	5–11	Freshman	Bergen, Norway
3	Hayley Thompson	Guard	6-1	Senior	Denver, Colorado
4	Emilie Hesseldal	Forward	6-1	Sophomore	Aarhus, Denmark
5	Hanne Mestdagh	Guard/forward	5-10	RS sophomore	Ieper, Belgium
10	Emily Johnson	Guard	5-11	Sophomore	Georgetown, Texas
11	Gritt Ryder	Guard	5-10	Junior	Rungsted Kyst, Denmark
12	Sam Martin	Forward	6-2	Senior	Parker, Colorado
13	Ellen Nystrom	Forward	6-1	Freshman	Luleå, Sweden
14	Gabby Frykbo	Guard	5-5	Freshman	Södertälje, Sweden
20	Kara Spotton	Forward	6-2	Junior	Fort Collins, Colorado
22	Elin Gustavsson	Forward	6-3	Freshman	Ängelholm, Sweden
24	Alicia Nichols	Forward	6-0	Senior	Brush, Colorado
33	Caitlin Duffy	Guard	5-11	Sophomore	Rapid City, South Dakota

== Schedule ==
Date time, TV	Rank^{#}	Opponent^{#}	Result	Record	Site (attendance) city, state
Exhibition
10/28/2013*; 7:00 pm		Colorado School of Mines	W 95–47	-	Moby Arena (N/A); Fort Collins, CO
11/01/2013*; 7:00 pm		Black Hills State	W 72–49	-	Moby Arena (802); Fort Collins, CO
Regular season
11/08/2013*; 8:00 pm		UC Colorado Springs	W 87–82 ^{OT}	1–0	Moby Arena (1,733); Fort Collins, CO
11/12/2013*; 7:00 pm		No. 17 Colorado	L 59–63	1–1	Moby Arena (1,437); Fort Collins, CO
11/16/2013*; 12:00 pm		Drake	W 92–77	2–1	Moby Arena (836); Fort Collins, CO
11/23/2013*; 3:00 pm		at Illinois State	W 76–61	3–1	Redbird Arena (867); Norman, IL
11/28/2013*; 8:00 pm		at Hawaii; Rainbow Wahine Showdown	W 65–60 ^{OT}	4–1	Stan Sheriff Center (1,615); Honolulu, HI
11/29/2013*; 3:00 pm		vs. Minnesota; Rainbow Wahine Showdown	L 55–79	4–2	Stan Sheriff Center (N/A); Honolulu, HI
11/30/2013*; 3:00 pm		vs. Chattanooga; Rainbow Wahine Showdown	L 57–59	4–3	Stan Sheriff Center (N/A); Honolulu, HI
12/05/2013*; 7:00 pm		Loyola Marymount	W 70–68	5–3	Moby Arena (840); Fort Collins, CO
12/08/2013*; 1:00 pm		at Denver	W 86–78	6–3	Magness Arena (1,557); Denver, CO
12/14/2013*; 1:00 pm		South Dakota Mines	W 67–47	7–3	Moby Arena (999); Fort Collins, CO
12/22/2013*; 2:00 pm		Weber State	W 59–54	8–3	Moby Arena (985); Fort Collins, CO
01/02/2014; 7:00 pm		at San Diego State	W 64–61	9–3 (1–0)	Viejas Arena (427); San Diego, CA
01/05/2014; 2:00 pm		New Mexico	W 72–60	10–3 (2–0)	Moby Arena (1,125); Fort Collins, CO
01/08/2014; 7:00 pm		San Jose State	W 101–60	11–3 (3–0)	Moby Arena (968); Fort Collins, CO
01/11/2014; 3:00 pm		at Fresno State	L 50–60	11–4 (3–1)	Save Mart Center (2,378); Fresno, CA
01/15/2014; 7:00 pm		Utah State	W 88–78	12–4 (4–1)	Moby Arena (1,091); Fort Collins, CO
01/18/2014; 1:00 pm		at Air Force	W 87–49	13–4 (5–1)	Clune Arena (635); Colorado Springs, CO
01/25/2014; 6:00 pm		at New Mexico	W 62–57	14–4 (6–1)	The Pit (6,431); Albuquerque, NM
01/29/2014; 7:00 pm		Nevada	W 71–64	15–4 (7–1)	Moby Arena (1,202); Fort Collins, CO
02/01/2014; 2:00 pm		San Diego State	W 95–48	16–4 (8–1)	Moby Arena (1,688); Fort Collins, CO
02/05/2014; 8:00 pm		at UNLV	W 66–48	17–4 (9–1)	Cox Pavilion (1,002); Paradise, NV
02/08/2014; 12:00 pm		Air Force	W 88–28	18–4 (10–1)	Moby Arena (2,209); Fort Collins, CO
02/12/2014; 7:00 pm		at Utah State	W 100–75	19–4 (11–1)	Smith Spectrum (583); Logan, UT
02/15/2014; 2:00 pm		Fresno State	W 53–47	20–4 (12–1)	Moby Arena (2,003); Fort Collins, CO
02/19/2014; 7:00 pm		at Boise State	W 71–51	21–4 (13–1)	Taco Bell Arena (996); Boise, ID
02/22/2014; 2:00 pm		at Wyoming	L 49–75	21–5 (13–2)	Arena-Auditorium (4,955); Laramie, WY
02/26/2014; 7:00 pm		UNLV	W 84–64	22–5 (14–2)	Moby Arena (1,626); Fort Collins, CO
03/04/2014; 8:00 pm		at San Jose State	L 64–65	22–6 (14–3)	Event Center Arena (420); San Jose, CA
03/07/2014; 7:00 pm		Wyoming	W 58–46	23–6 (15–3)	Moby Arena (3,119); Fort Collins, CO
2014 Mountain West Conference women's basketball tournament
03/11/2014; 1:00 pm		vs. Utah State; Quarterfinals	W 72–67	24–6	Thomas & Mack Center (N/A); Paradise, NV
03/12/2014; 1:00 pm		vs. Wyoming; Semifinals	W 95–92 ^{3OT}	25–6	Thomas & Mack Center (N/A); Paradise, NV
03/13/2014; 8:00 pm, CBSSN		vs. Fresno State; Championship Game	L 68–77	25–7	Thomas & Mack Center (13,798); Paradise, NV
2014 WNIT
03/20/2014; 7:00 pm		Southern Utah; First Round	L 56–71	25–8	Moby Arena (1,550); Fort Collins, CO
*Non-conference game. ^{#}Rankings from AP Poll. (#) Tournament seedings in parentheses. All times are in Mountain Time. All dates, times and TV are tentative and subject to change.

== See also ==
- 2013–14 Colorado State Rams men's basketball team
