= 2013–14 Pacific Tigers women's basketball team =

Intercollegiate basketball season

2013–14 Pacific Tigers women's basketball

WNIT, First Round
- Conference: West Coast Conference
- Record: 18–13 (12–6 WCC)
- Head coach: Lynne Roberts (8th season)
- Assistant coaches: Bradley Davis; Gavin Petersen; Amy VanHollebeke
- Home arena: Alex G. Spanos Center

2013–14 West Coast Conference women's basketball standings
	Conf.				Overall
Team	W		L	PCT	W		L	PCT
No. 18 Gonzaga†	16	–	2	.889	29	–	5	.853
BYU	14	–	4	.778	28	–	7	.800
Pacific	12	–	6	.667	18	–	13	.581
Saint Mary's	11	–	7	.611	23	–	10	.697
San Diego	11	–	7	.611	24	–	9	.727
Portland	7	–	11	.389	14	–	16	.467
Santa Clara	6	–	12	.333	10	–	20	.333
San Francisco	6	–	12	.333	12	–	19	.387
Loyola Marymount	6	–	12	.333	9	–	21	.300
Pepperdine	1	–	17	.056	6	–	25	.194
† 2014 WCC tournament winner As of March 29, 2014; Rankings from AP Poll

The 2013–14 Pacific Tigers women's basketball team represented the University of the Pacific during the 2013–14 NCAA Division I women's basketball season. The Tigers had a season of new beginnings as they joined a new conference- the West Coast Conference. Pacific was one of the founders of what became the WCC. After four decades the Tigers returned, allowing the WCC to return to a travel partner scenario. Pacific and Saint Mary's became travel partners. The other 4 sets of travel partners were San Francsico and Santa Clara, Loyola Marymount and Pepperdine, Gonzaga and Portland, and BYU and San Diego. The Tigers were led by eighth year head coach Lynne Roberts and played their home games in the Alex G. Spanos Center. The Tigers would finish the season 18–13, placing third in the WCC, and participate in their third consecutive WNIT Tournament.

== Roster ==
2013–14 Pacific Tigers women's basketball team
Players
Coaches

Pos.	#	Name	Height	Year	Previous school	Hometown
G	2	Gena Johnson	5 ft 9 in (1.75 m)	Sr	Franklin	Elk Grove, CA
G	3	Kristina Johnson	5 ft 5 in (1.65 m)	Jr	Santa Monica	Santa Monica, CA
G	4	Halie Bergman	5 ft 10 in (1.78 m)	Fr	Turlock Christian	Turlock, CA
G	5	Emily Simons	5 ft 10 in (1.78 m)	Fr	Box Hill Secondary	Doncaster, Victoria, Australia
F	10	Kendall Kenyon	6 ft 2 in (1.88 m)	Jr	St. Mary's	Stockton, CA
G	11	Madison Parrish	5 ft 8 in (1.73 m)	Jr	Hanford; Fresno State	Hanford, CA
F	12	Erin Butler	5 ft 11 in (1.8 m)	RS So	Mission Viejo; Arizona	Rancho Santa Margarita, CA
G	14	Sam Pettinger	5 ft 10 in (1.78 m)	Sr	Archbishop Murphy	Everett, WA
G	20	Unique Coleman	5 ft 10 in (1.78 m)	Fr	St. Mary's	Stockton, CA
G	21	Claire Conricode	5 ft 9 in (1.75 m)	Jr	Holy Names	Bothell, WA
G	23	Hailie Eackles	5 ft 9 in (1.75 m)	RS So	Pinewood	Sunnyvale, CA
G	24	Kiki Moore	5 ft 8 in (1.73 m)	RS Sr	Sacred Heart Cathedral Prep; Fresno State	San Francisco, CA
F	32	Shanice Butler	6 ft 2 in (1.88 m)	Sr	Kennedy	Sacramento, CA
F	40	Marjorie Heard	6 ft 1 in (1.85 m)	RS Jr	Glacier Peak	Snohomish, WA
F	44	Jasmine Jenkins	6 ft 2 in (1.88 m)	Fr	Dougherty Valley	San Ramon, CA

Head coach

- Lynne Roberts (Seattle Pacific)

Assistant coach(es)

- Bradley Davis (California)
- Gavin Petersen (Hawaii Pacific)
- Amy VanHollebeke (Pacific)

Legend

- (C) Team captain
- (S) Suspended
- (I) Ineligible
- (W) Walk-on
- Injured
- Current redshirt

Roster
Last update: 2013-09-27

== Schedule ==
Date time, TV	Rank^{#}	Opponent^{#}	Result	Record	Site city, state
Exhibition
11/01/2013*; 7:00 pm		Cal State East Bay	W 66–62	-	Alex G. Spanos Center; Stockton, CA
Regular Season
11/08/2013*; 7:00 pm		Stanislaus State	W 95–65	1–0	Alex G. Spanos Center; Stockton, CA
11/11/2013*; 7:00 pm		UC Davis	W 86–78	2–0	Alex G. Spanos Center; Stockton, CA
11/15/2013*; 4:00 pm		at Iona	L 70–83	2–1	Hynes Athletic Center; New Rochelle, NY
11/17/2013*; 11:00 am		at Fordham	L 63–84	2–2	Rose Hill Gymnasium; Bronx, NY
11/23/2013*; 5:00 pm		Arizona	W 75–66	3–2	Alex G. Spanos Center; Stockton, CA
11/30/2013*; 2:00 pm		Notre Dame de Namur	W 102–41	4–2	Alex G. Spanos Center; Stockton, CA
12/07/2013*; 2:00 pm		at No. 21 Cal	L 66–68 ^{OT}	4–3	Haas Pavilion; Berkeley, CA
12/15/2013*; 1:00 pm		Hawaii	L 70–81	4–4	Alex G. Spanos Center; Stockton, CA
12/20/2013*; 7:00 pm, BigWest.tv		vs. No. 24 Florida State; Long Beach Classic	L 66–73	4–5	Walter Pyramid; Long Beach, CA
12/21/2013*; 3:00 pm, BigWest.tv		vs. Richmond; Long Beach Classic	W 59–57	5–5	Walter Pyramid; Long Beach, CA
12/28/2013; 2:00 pm		Portland	L 65–73	5–6 (0–1)	Alex G. Spanos Center; Stockton, CA
12/30/2014; 5:30 pm		Gonzaga	W 83–68	5–7 (0–2)	Alex G. Spanos Center; Stockton, CA
01/02/2014; 6:00 pm, BYUtv		at BYU	W 75–62	6–7 (1–2)	Marriott Center; Provo, UT
01/04/2014; 2:00 pm		San Diego	L 70–75 ^{OT}	6–8 (1–3)	Jenny Craig Pavilion; San Diego, CA
01/09/2014; 7:00 pm		at San Francisco	W 80–67	7–8 (2–3)	War Memorial Gymnasium; San Francisco, CA
01/11/2014; 2:00 pm		at Santa Clara	W 88–68	8–8 (3–3)	Leavey Center; Santa Clara, CA
01/16/2014; 7:00 pm, TheW.tv		Loyola Marymount	L 84–90	8–9 (3–4)	Alex G. Spanos Center; Stockton, CA
01/18/2014; 2:00 pm, TheW.tv		Pepperdine	W 75–64	9–9 (4–4)	Alex G. Spanos Center; Stockton, CA
01/25/2014; 4:30 pm, TheW.tv		Saint Mary's	W 91–80	10–9 (5–4)	Alex G. Spanos Center; Stockton, CA
01/30/2014; 7:00 pm, TheW.tv		San Diego	W 80–70	11–9 (6–4)	Alex G. Spanos Center; Stockton, CA
02/01/2014; 2:00 pm, TheW.tv		BYU	L 57–88	11–10 (6–5)	Alex G. Spanos Center; Stockton, CA
02/08/2014; 1:00 pm, TheW.tv		at Saint Mary's	W 88–71	12–10 (7–5)	McKeon Pavilion; Moraga, CA
02/13/2014; 7:00 pm, TV-32		at Pepperdine	W 91–67	13–10 (8–5)	Firestone Fieldhouse; Malibu, CA
02/15/2014; 2:00 pm		at Loyola Marymount	W 102–95	14–10 (9–5)	Gersten Pavilion; Los Angeles, CA
02/20/2014; 7:00 pm, TheW.tv		Santa Clara	W 64–47	15–10 (10–5)	Alex G. Spanos Center; Stockton, CA
02/22/2014; 2:00 pm, TheW.tv		San Francisco	W 83–65	16–10 (11–5)	Alex G. Spanos Center; Stockton, CA
02/27/2014; 7:00 pm		at Portland	W 70–57	17–10 (12–5)	Chiles Center; Portland, OR
03/01/2014; 2:00 pm		at No. 22 Gonzaga	L 77–81	17–11 (12–6)	McCarthey Athletic Center; Spokane, WA
2014 WCC Tournament
03/07/2014; 2:30 pm, BYUtv		vs. Portland	W 84–72	18–11	Orleans Arena; Paradise, NV
03/10/2014; 4:30 pm, BYUtv		vs. BYU	L 64–77	18–12	Orleans Arena; Paradise, NV
2014 WNIT
03/20/2014; 7:00 pm		at Oregon; First Round	L 63–90	18–13	Matthew Knight Arena; Eugene, OR
*Non-conference game. ^{#}Rankings from AP Poll. (#) Tournament seedings in parentheses. All times are in Pacific Time.

== Game summaries ==
=== Exhibition: Cal State East Bay ===
Nov 1
7:00 pm PDT

Recap

Cal State East Bay Pioneers 62, Pacific Tigers 66
Scoring by half: 30-31, 32-35
Pts: Micah Walker 14; Rebs: Danielle Peacon 9 Asts: Sarah Finlay 5	Pts: Kendall Kenyon 18; Rebs: Kendall Kenyon 14; Asts: Kiki Moore 7

Alex G. Spanos Center
Stockton, CA
Attendance: 421
Referees: Anita Ortega, Darren Krzesnik, Benny Luna

=== Cal State Stanislaus ===
Nov 8
7:05 pm PST

Recap

Cal State Stanislaus Warriors 65, Pacific Tigers 95
Scoring by half: 37-49, 28-46
Pts: Riley Holladay 17; Rebs: Ana Burch 7 Asts: Ana Burch 7	Pts: Kendall Kenyon 27; Rebs: Kendall Kenyon 24; Asts: Kristina Jonson & Madison Parrish 6

Alex G. Spanos Center
Stockton, CA
Attendance: 601
Referees: Wanda Szeremeta, Renee Robinson, Lisa Ulmer

=== UC Davis ===
Nov 11
7:00 pm PST

Recap

UC Davis Aggies 78, Pacific Tigers 86
Scoring by half: 42-39, 36-47
Pts: Sydnee Fipps 25; Rebs: Sydnee Fipps 6 Asts: Brianna Salvatore 4	Pts: Erin Butler 17; Rebs: Kiki Moore & Marjorie Heard 9 Asts: Kiki Moore 7

Alex G. Spanos Center
Stockton, CA
Attendance: 418
Referees: Michol Murray, Kenneth Nash, Tiffany Jump

=== Iona ===
Nov 15
7:00 pm EST

Recap

Pacific Tigers 70, Iona Gaels 83
Scoring by half: 44-44, 26-39
Pts: Kendall Kenyon 24; Rebs: Kendall Kenyon 12; Asts: Kiki Moore 6	Pts: Damika Martinez 28; Rebs: Joy Adams 15; Asts: Haley D'Angelo 4

Hynes Athletic Center
New Rochelle, NY
Attendance: 489
Referees: John Riordan, Duane Mack, Randall Amey

=== Fordham ===
Nov 17
2:05 pm EST

Recap

Pacific Tigers 63, Fordham Rams 84
Scoring by half: 26-45, 37-39
Pts: Kiki Moore 20; Rebs: Shanice Butler 6 Asts: Madison Parrish & Hailie Eackles 2	Pts: Erin Rooney 23; Rebs: Erin Rooney 10; Asts: Erin Rooney 5

Rose Hill Gymnasium
Bronx, NY
Attendance: 325
Referees: Michael DoCouto, Elizabeth Kuzmeski, Heather C. Browne

=== Arizona ===
Nov 23
5:00 pm EST

Recap

Arizona Wildcats 66, Pacific Tigers 75
Scoring by half: 29-29, 37-46
Pts: Kama Griffitts 16; Rebs: Breanna Workman 8 Asts: Carissa Crutchfield 5	Pts: Kendall Kenyon 20; Rebs: Kendall Kenyon 10; Asts: Kiki Moore 5

Alex G. Spanos Center
Stockton, CA
Attendance: 722
Referees: Karen Lasuik, Kyle In'Fini Robinson

=== Notre Dame de Namur ===
Nov 30
2:00 pm PST

Recap

Notre Dame de Namur Argonauts 41, Pacific Tigers 102
Scoring by half: 20-42, 21-60
Pts: Jasmine Waiters & Hannan Salah 10; Rebs: Jennifer Jasper 10; Asts: Danielle Lasirona 2	Pts: Kiki Moore 20; Rebs: Kendall Kenyon 12; Asts: Kristina Johnson 8

Alex G. Spanos Center
Stockton, CA
Attendance: 304
Referees: Darren Krzesnik, Steve Belnap, Lisa Ulmer

=== California ===
Dec 7
2:00 pm EST

Recap

Pacific Tigers 66, Cal Golden Bears 68 (OT)
Scoring by half: 26-26, 37-37 Overtime: 3-5
Pts: Kendall Kenyon 29; Rebs: Kendall Kenyon 16; Asts: Madison Parrish 8	Pts: Reshanda Gray 23; Rebs: Reshanda Gray 11; Asts: Brittany Boyd 5

Haas Pavilion
Berkeley, CA
Attendance: 1,761
Referees: Michael Price, Benny Luna, Rick Showers

=== Hawaiʻi ===
Dec 15
1:05 pm PST

Recap

Hawaiʻi Rainbow Wahine 81, Pacific Tigers 70
Scoring by half: 32-36, 49-34
Pts: Ashleigh Karaitiana 15; Rebs: Destiny King 7 Asts: Sydney Haydel 7	Pts: Kiki Moore 20; Rebs: Kendall Kenyon 10; Asts: Madison Parrish 5

Alex G. Spanos Center
Stockton, CA
Attendance: 534
Referees: Anita Ortega, Teresa Turner, Felicity Willis

=== Florida State ===
BigWest.tv

Dec 20
7:30 pm EST

Recap

Pacific Tigers 66, Florida State Seminoles 73
Scoring by half: 25-30, 41-43
Pts: Kendall Kenyon 24; Rebs: Kendall Kenyon 11; Asts: Kiki Moore 5	Pts: Natasha Howard 20; Rebs: Natasha Howard 8 Asts: Yashira Delgado 4

Walter Pyramid
Long Beach, CA
Attendance: 776
Referees: Jay Schumaker, Norma Leibfreid, Mark Penaflor

=== Richmond ===
BigWest.tv

Dec 21
3:00 pm PST

Recap

Pacific Tigers 59, Richmond Spiders 57
Scoring by half: 32-29, 27-28
Pts: Kiki Moore 15; Rebs: Kendall Kenyon 8 Asts: Kiki Moore 4 Kendall Kenyon 4 blocks	Pts: Olivia Healey 20; Rebs: Olivia Healey 12; Asts: Amber Nichols 3

Walter Pyramid
Long Beach, CA
Attendance: N/A
Referees: Gordon Torigoe, Clifford Sims Sr., Richard Waters

=== Portland ===
Series History: Portland leads 6-2

Dec 28
2:00 pm PST

Recap

Portland Pilots 73, Pacific Tigers 65
Scoring by half: 39-30, 34-35
Pts: Jasmine Wooton 36; Rebs: Cassandra Brown 12; Asts: Amy Pupa 6	Pts: Kendall Kenyon 22; Rebs: Kendall Kenyon 21; Asts: Kiki Moore 7

Alex G. Spanos Center
Stockton, CA
Attendance: 490
Referees: Brenda Pantoja, Michol Murray, In'Fini Robinson

=== Gonzaga ===
Series History: Pacific leads 2-1

Dec 30
5:00 pm PST

Recap

Gonzaga Bulldogs 83, Pacific Tigers 68
Scoring by half: 43-32, 40-36
Pts: Keani Albanez 21; Rebs: Shaniqua Nilles 7 Asts: Haiden Palmer 6	Pts: Kiki Moore 24; Rebs: Kendall Kenyon 14; Asts: Kiki Moore & Marjorie Heard 2

Alex G. Spanos Center
Stockton, CA
Attendance: N/A
Referees: Anita Ortega, Cheryl Flores, Skelly Wingard

=== BYU ===
Series History: BYU leads series 5-1
Broadcasters: Spencer Linton, Jarom Jordan, and Andy Boyce

BYUtv

Jan 3
7:05 pm MST

Recap

Pacific Tigers 75, BYU Cougars 62
Scoring by half: 38-29, 37-33
Pts: Sam Pettinger 16; Rebs: Erin Butler 6 Asts: Maddison Parrish 9	Pts: Jennifer Hamson 22; Rebs: Ashley Garfield 15; Asts: Kim Beeston & Ashley Garfield 4

Marriott Center
Provo, UT
Attendance: 455
Referees: Robert Scofield, Rick Showers, Lisa Ulmer

=== San Diego ===
Series History: San Diego leads 10-2

USD TV

Jan 4
2:05 pm PST

Recap

Pacific Tigers 70, San Diego Toreros 75 (OT)
Scoring by half: 24-39, 40-25 Overtime: 6-11
Pts: Kendall Kenyon 19; Rebs: Kendall Kenyon 10; Asts: Kiki Moore 4	Pts: Amy Kame 28; Rebs: Amy Kame & Felicia Wijenberg 11; Asts: Amy Kame & Katherine Hamilton 2

Jenny Craig Pavilion
San Diego, CA
Attendance: 521
Referees: Cathi Cornell, Bethany Graves, Tiffany Bird

=== San Francisco ===
Series History: San Francisco leads 15-12

Jan 9
7:00 pm PST

Recap

Pacific Tigers 80, San Francisco Dons 67
Scoring by half: 48-28, 32-39
Pts: Kiki Moore 20; Rebs: Kendall Kenyon & Kiki Moore 11; Asts: Kiki Moore 6	Pts: Taylor Proctor 29; Rebs: Taylor Proctor 10; Asts: Taylor Proctor 2

War Memorial Gymnasium
San Francisco, CA
Attendance: 521
Referees: Anita Ortega, Richard Waters, Steve Belnap

=== Santa Clara ===
Series History: Santa Clara leads 25-16

Jan 11
2:00 pm PST

Recap

Pacific Tigers 88, Santa Clara Broncos 68
Scoring by half: 44-36, 44-32
Pts: Kendall Kenyon 25; Rebs: Kendall Kenyon & Marjorie Heard 10; Asts: Madison Parrish & Kiki Moore 5	Pts: Ruta Zurauskyte 16; Rebs: Jo Paine & Ruta Zurauskyta 7 Asts: Raquel Avila 7

Leavey Center
Santa Clara, CA
Attendance: 403
Referees: Wanda Szeremeta, Alex Carrol, In'Fini Robinson

=== Loyola Marymount ===
Series History: Pacific leads series 1-0
Broadcasters: Don Gubbins and Alex Sanchez

TheW.tv

Jan 16
7:00 pm PST

Recap

Loyola Marymount Lions 90, Pacific Tigers 84
Scoring by half: 55-36, 35-48
Pts: Hazel Ramirez 25; Rebs: Mackenzie Kerins 11; Asts: Hazel Ramirez 7	Pts: Kiki Moore 22; Rebs: Kendall Kenyon 13; Asts: Kiki Moore 5

Alex G. Spanos Center
Stockton, CA
Attendance: 365
Referees: Cathi Cornell, Shelley Nakasone, Skelly Wingard

=== Pepperdine ===
Series History: Pepperdine leads 3-0
Broadcasters: Don Gubbins and Alex Sanchez

TheW.tv

Jan 18
2:05 pm PST

Recap

Pepperdine Waves 64, Pacific Tigers 75
Scoring by half: 28-25, 36-50
Pts: Ea Shoushtari 18; Rebs: Ea Shoushtari 9 Asts: Grace Leah Barnes 4	Pts: Kendall Kenyon 21; Rebs: Erin Butler 12; Asts: Kiki Moore 6

Alex G. Spanos Center
Stockton, CA
Attendance: 705
Referees: Penny Davis, Bethany Graves, Brian Woods

=== Saint Mary's ===
Series History: Saint Mary's leads 13-6
Broadcasters: Don Gubbins

TheW.tv

Jan 25
4:30 pm PST

Recap

Saint Mary's Gaels 80, Pacific Tigers 91
Scoring by half: 43-41, 37-50
Pts: Jackie Nared 33; Rebs: Danielle Mauldin 10; Asts: Kate Gaze 7	Pts: Kendall Kenyon 28; Rebs: Kendall Kenyon & Kiki Moore 8 Asts: Kiki Moore 8

Alex G. Spanos Center
Stockton, CA
Attendance: N/A
Referees: Brenda Pantoja, Cathi Cornell, Bart Baldwin

=== San Diego ===
Series History: San Diego leads 11-2
Broadcasters: Don Gubbins

TheW.tv

Jan 30
7:05 pm PST

Recap

San Diego Toreros 70, Pacific Tigers 80
Scoring by half: 45-37, 25-43
Pts: Sophia Ederaine 17; Rebs: Sophia Ederaine 15; Asts: Amy Kame 5	Pts: Kiki Moore 23; Rebs: Kendall Kenyon 13; Asts: Kiki Moore 5

Alex G. Spanos Center
Stockton, CA
Attendance: 394
Referees: Melissa Barlow, Karen Lasuik, Cheryl Flores

=== BYU ===
Series History: BYU leads 5-2
Broadcaster: Don Gubbins

TheW.tv

Feb 1
2:05 pm PST

Recap

BYU Cougars 88, Pacific Tigers 57
Scoring by half: 43-33, 45-24
Pts: Jennifer Hamson 25; Rebs: Jennifer Hamson 18; Asts: Kylie Maeda 7	Pts: Kiki Moore 17; Rebs: Kendall Kenyon 8 Asts: Sam Pettinger 4

Alex G. Spanos Center
Stockton, CA
Attendance: 583
Referees: Anita Ortega, Alex Carroll, Kenneth Nash

=== Saint Mary's ===
Series History: Saint Mary's leads 13-7
Broadcasters: George Devine and Mary Hile-Nepfel

TheW.tv

Feb 8
4:30 pm PST

Recap

Pacific Tigers 88, Saint Mary's Gaels 71
Scoring by half: 46-34, 42-37
Pts: Erin Butler 19; Rebs: Kendall Kenyon 10; Asts: Sam Pettinger 4	Pts: Danielle Mauldin 24; Rebs: Jackie Nared & Danielle Mauldin 9 Asts: Kate Gaze 8

McKeon Pavilion
Moraga, CA
Attendance: 263
Referees: Kyle Bacon, Cheryll Blue, Rigoberto Vasquez

=== Pepperdine ===
Series History: Pepperdine leads 3-1
Broadcasters: Josh Perigo

TV-32

Feb 13
7:00 pm PST

Recap

Pacific Tigers 91, Pepperdine Waves 67
Scoring by half: 46-28, 45-29
Pts: Hailie Eackles 16; Rebs: Kendall Kenyon 8 Asts: Kristina Johnson 4	Pts: Keitra Wallace 20; Rebs: Ea Shoushtari 9 Asts: Ea Shoushtari 5

Firestone Fieldhouse
Malbu, CA
Attendance: 203
Referees: Melissa Barlow, Michelle Russi, Kenneth Nash

=== Loyola Marymount ===
Series History: Pacific leads series 2-0

Feb 15
2:00 pm PST

Recap

Pacific Tigers 102, Loyola Marymount Lions 95
Scoring by half: 41-35, 61-60
Pts: Madison Parrish 28; Rebs: Kendall Kenyon 13; Asts: Madison Parrish 5	Pts: Mackenzie Kerins 21; Rebs: Emily Ben-Jumbo & Mackenzie Kerins 9 Asts: Hazel Ramirez 12

Gersten Pavilion
Los Angeles, CA
Attendance: 468
Referees: Lucy Banuelos, Teresa Turner, Janetta Graham

=== Santa Clara ===
Series History: Santa Clara leads 25-17
Broadcaster: Don Gubbins

Feb 20
2:00 pm PST

Recap

Santa Clara Broncos 47, Pacific Tigers 64
Scoring by half: 23-35, 24-29
Pts: Nici Gilday 15; Rebs: Vanessa Leo 6 Asts: Montana Walters 4	Pts: Shanice Butler 13; Rebs: Kendall Kenyon 9 Asts: Kiki Moore 7

Alex G. Spanos Center
Stockton, CA
Attendance: 537
Referees: Lisa Jones, Bart Baldwin, Steve Belnap

=== San Francisco ===
Series History: San Francisco leads 15-13
Broadcaster: Don Gubbins

TheW.tv

Feb 22
2:06 pm PST

Recap

San Francisco Dons 65, Pacific Tigers 83
Scoring by half: 30-42, 35-41
Pts: Taj Winston 17; Rebs: Taylor Proctor 10; Asts: Rachel Howard 4	Pts: Kiki Moore 21; Rebs: Kendall Kenyon 12; Asts: Madison Parrish 5

Alex G. Spanos Center
Stockton, CA
Attendance: 605
Referees: Penny Davis, Alejandro Moreno, Rigo Vasquez

=== Portland ===
Series History: Portland leads 7-2

Feb 27
7:00 pm PST

Recap

Pacific Tigers 70, Portland Pilots 57
Scoring by half: 33-17, 37-40
Pts: Kendall Kenyon 17; Rebs: Kiki Moore 14; Asts: Madison Parrish & Sam Pettinger 6	Pts: Kari Luttinen 13; Rebs: Cassandra Thompson 7 Asts: Jasmine Wooton & Amy Pupa 3

Chiles Center
Portland, OR
Attendance: 366
Referees: Karen Lasuik, Alecia Murray, Gordon Torigoe

=== Gonzaga ===
Series History: Series even 2-2

Mar 1
2:00 pm PST

Recap

Pacific Tigers 77, Gonzaga Bulldogs 81
Scoring by half: 34-39, 43-42
Pts: Kiki Moore 33; Rebs: Kendall Kenyon 10; Asts: Madison Parrish & Kiki Moore 4	Pts: Sunny Greinacher 24; Rebs: Shelby Cheslek 9 Asts: Jazmine Redmon & Shelby Cheslek 4

McCarthey Athletic Center
Spokane, WA
Attendance: 5,882
Referees: Darren Krzesnik, Alex Carrol, Julie Vanni

== Rankings ==
+ Regular season polls	Poll	Pre- Season	Week 1	Week 2	Week 3	Week 4	Week 5	Week 6	Week 7	Week 8	Week 9	Week 10	Week 11	Week 12	Week 13	Week 14	Week 15	Week 16	Week 17	Week 18 Postseason	Final
AP																					
Coaches																					

Legend
	Increase in ranking
	Decrease in ranking
	No change
(RV)	Received votes
