= 2013–14 New Mexico Lobos women's basketball team =

Intercollegiate basketball season

2013–14 New Mexico Lobos women's basketball
- Conference: Mountain West Conference
- Record: 11–19 (6–12 Mountain West)
- Head coach: Yvonne Sanchez (3rd season)
- Assistant coaches: Joseph Anders; Edwina Brown; Anthony Turner
- Home arena: The Pit

2013–14 Mountain West Conference women's basketball standings
	Conf.				Overall
Team	W		L	PCT	W		L	PCT
Colorado State	15	–	3	.833	25	–	8	.758
Fresno State†	13	–	5	.722	22	–	11	.667
Nevada	12	–	6	.667	18	–	13	.581
Boise State	12	–	6	.667	18	–	14	.563
Wyoming	10	–	8	.556	20	–	11	.645
San Diego State	9	–	9	.500	13	–	17	.433
UNLV	9	–	9	.500	13	–	19	.406
Utah State	8	–	10	.444	15	–	16	.484
New Mexico	6	–	12	.333	11	–	19	.367
San Jose State	5	–	13	.278	11	–	19	.367
Air Force	0	–	18	.000	1	–	28	.034
† 2014 MWC tournament winner As of March 22, 2014; Rankings from AP poll

The 2013–14 New Mexico Lobos women's basketball team represented the University of New Mexico during the 2013–14 NCAA Division I women's basketball season. The Lobos, led by third year head coach Yvonne Sanchez, played play their home games at The Pit and were members of the Mountain West Conference.

== 2013–14 Roster ==
2013–14 New Mexico Lobos women's basketball team
Players
Coaches

Pos.	#	Name	Height	Year	Previous school	Hometown
G	1	Brooke Allemand	5 ft 5 in (1.65 m)	Fr	Boerne-Samuel V. Champion HS	Fair Oaks Ranch, Texas
F	3	Josie Greenwood	5 ft 11 in (1.8 m)	Fr	Rosny College	Hobart, Australia
G	4	Alex Lapeyrolerie	5 ft 11 in (1.8 m)	Fr	Edward S. Marcus HS	Highland Village, Texas
F	11	Alexa Chavez (W)	6 ft 0 in (1.83 m)	So	St. Michael's HS	Santa Fe, N.M.
G	12	Bryce Owens	5 ft 4 in (1.63 m)	So	DeSoto HS	DeSoto, Texas
F	13	Khadijah Shumpert	6 ft 0 in (1.83 m)	So	Benilde St. Margaret's HS	Minneapolis, Minn.
G	15	Antiesha Brown	5 ft 10 in (1.78 m)	RS Jr	Texas Tech	Clovis, N.M.
G	20	Sara Halasz	5 ft 11 in (1.8 m)	RS Sr	Lakes (Wash.) HS	Ohatchee, Ala.
G	21	Marissa Perry (W)	5 ft 4 in (1.63 m)	Fr	Hope Christian HS	Albuquerque, N.M.
G	25	Brea Mitchell	5 ft 10 in (1.78 m)	So	Plano West HS	Plano, Texas
F	30	Lauren Newman	6 ft 1 in (1.85 m)	Fr	El Dorado HS	El Paso, Texas
F	32	Kianna Keller	6 ft 4 in (1.93 m)	Fr	Waukesha West HS	Waukesha, Wisc.
C	33	Maddie Muraida (W)	6 ft 2 in (1.88 m)	Jr	Albuquerque Academy	Albuquerque, N.M.
C	34	Whitney Johnson	6 ft 2 in (1.88 m)	RS So	Lone Peak HS	Highland, Utah
C	42	Ebony Walker	6 ft 2 in (1.88 m)	RS Jr	Texas Tech	Albuquerque, N.M.
F	44	Deeva Vaughn	6 ft 0 in (1.83 m)	RS Sr	Northern Oklahoma - Enid	Albuquerque, N.M.

Head coach

Yvonne Sanchez

Assistant coach(es)

Joseph Anders
Edwina Brown
Anthony Turner

Legend

- (C) Team captain
- (S) Suspended
- (I) Ineligible
- (W) Walk-on
- Injured
- Current redshirt

Roster
Last update: 2013-09-01

== Schedule and results ==
Date time, TV	Rank^{#}	Opponent^{#}	Result	Record	Site (attendance) city, state
Exhibition
11/02/2013*; 3:00 pm		New Mexico Highlands	W 81–48	–	The Pit (5,533); Albuquerque, NM
11/05/2013*; 7:00 pm, MWN		Western New Mexico	W 85–47	–	The Pit (5,486); Albuquerque, NM
Regular Season
11/09/2013*; 3:00 pm, MWN		Loyola Marymount	W 69–65	1–0	The Pit (5,439); Albuquerque, NM
11/13/2013*; 5:30 pm		at Texas Tech	L 56–64	1–1	United Spirit Arena (3,345); Lubbock, TX
11/19/2013*; 7:00 pm, MWN		Texas	L 52–67	1–2	The Pit (6,083); Albuquerque, NM
11/23/2013*; 1:00 pm, MWN		No. 16 Colorado	L 53–85	1–3	The Pit (5,951); Albuquerque, NM
11/26/2013*; 7:00 pm, MWN		Milwaukee	W 72–58	2–3	The Pit (5,379); Albuquerque, NM
11/29/2013*; 7:00 pm, MWN		Binghamton; Thanksgiving Tournament	L 53–58	2–4	The Pit (5,476); Albuquerque, NM
11/30/2013*; 7:00 pm, MWN		Charlotte; Thanksgiving Tournament	W 73–55	3–4	The Pit (5,375); Albuquerque, NM
12/07/2013*; 7:00 pm, MWN		New Mexico State; Rio Grande Rivalry	W 65–55	4–4	The Pit (6,392); Albuquerque, NM
12/16/2013*; 8:00 pm		at No. 6 Stanford	L 41–75	4–5	Maples Pavilion (3,397); Stanford, CA
12/28/2013*; 1:00 pm		vs. Western Carolina; Miami Hurricane Tournament	W 56–37	5–5	BankUnited Center (5,486); Coral Gables, FL
12/29/2013*; 1:00 pm		vs. Miami; Miami Hurricane Tournament	L 50–67	5–6	BankUnited Center (773); Coral Gables, FL
01/05/2014; 2:00 pm, MWN		at Colorado State	L 50–62	5–7 (0–1)	Moby Arena (1,125); Fort Collins, CO
01/08/2014; 7:00 pm, MWN		Wyoming	W 75–65	6–7 (1–1)	The Pit (5,445); Albuquerque, NM
01/11/2014; 7:00 pm, MWN		San Jose State	W 80–68	7–7 (2–1)	The Pit (6,025); Albuquerque, NM
01/15/2014; 8:00 pm, MWN		at UNLV	L 56–78	7–8 (2–2)	Cox Pavilion (717); Paradise, NV
01/18/2014; 2:00 pm, MWN		Fresno State	L 73–75	7–9 (2–3)	The Pit (6,911); Albuquerque, NM
01/22/2014; 7:00 pm, MWN		at Boise State	L 60–74	7–10 (2–4)	Taco Bell Arena (656); Boise, ID
01/25/2014; 2:00 pm, MWN		Colorado State	L 57–62	7–11 (2–5)	The Pit (6,431); Albuquerque, NM
01/29/2014; 7:00 pm, MWN		Utah State	L 69–75	7–12 (2–6)	The Pit (6,038); Albuquerque, NM
02/01/2014; 3:00 pm, MWN		at San Jose State	W 76–73	8–12 (3–6)	Event Center Arena (136); San Jose, CA
02/05/2014; 7:00 pm, MWN		at Wyoming	L 75–79	8–13 (3–7)	Arena-Auditorium (2,974); Laramie, WY
02/12/2014; 7:00 pm, MWN		Boise State	L 80–86	8–14 (3–8)	The Pit (5,311); Albuquerque, NM
02/15/2014; 5:00 pm, MWN		at Nevada	L 73–75	8–15 (3–9)	Lawlor Events Center (1,167); Reno, NV
02/19/2014; 7:00 pm, MWN		UNLV	W 65–58	9–15 (4–9)	The Pit (6,539); Albuquerque, NM
02/22/2014; 3:00 pm, MWN		at San Diego State	L 48–53	9–16 (4–10)	Viejas Arena (608); San Diego, CA
02/26/2014; 7:00 pm, MWN		at Utah State	L 65-67	9-17 (4-11)	Smith Spectrum (623); Logan, UT
03/01/2014; 2:00 pm, MWN		Nevada	W 60-55	9-18 (4-12)	The Pit (5,936); Albuquerque, NM
03/04/2014; 7:00 pm, MWN		at Air Force	W 76-62	10-18 (5-12)	Clune Arena (232); Colorado Springs, CO
03/07/2014; 7:00 pm, MWN		San Diego State	W 62-46	11-18 (6-12)	The Pit (5,900); Albuquerque, NM
2014 Mountain West Conference women's basketball tournament
03/10/2014; 2:00 pm, MWN		vs. Utah State; First Round	L 66-69	11-19	Thomas & Mack Center; Paradise, NV
*Non-conference game. ^{#}Rankings from AP Poll. (#) Tournament seedings in parentheses. All times are in Mountain Time. All dates, times and TV are tentative and subject to change.

== See also ==
2013–14 New Mexico Lobos men's basketball team
