= 2014 Women's National Invitation Tournament =

College basketball postseason tournament

- Season: 2013–14
- Teams: 64
- Finals site: Don Haskins Center, El Paso, Texas
- Champions: Rutgers (1st title)
- Runner-up: UTEP (1st title game)
- Winning coach: C. Vivian Stringer (1st title)
- MVP: Kahleah Copper (Rutgers)
- Attendance: 12,222 (championship game)

The 2014 Women's National Invitation Tournament was a single-elimination tournament of 64 NCAA Division I teams that were not selected to participate in the 2014 Women's NCAA tournament. The annual tournament began on March 19 and ended on April 5. All games were played on the campus sites of participating schools. The Tournament was won by the Rutgers Scarlet Knights who defeated the UTEP Miners, 56–54, in the championship game before a sellout crowd of 12,222 at the Don Haskins Center in El Paso, Texas.

== Participants ==
64 teams were selected to participate in the 2014 WNIT. 32 teams received automatic berths into the tournament from being the highest-ranked team in their conference that failed to make the NCAA women's tournament. The other 32 teams earned at-large bids, by having a winning record but failing to make the NCAA Women's Tournament.

=== Automatic qualifiers ===
Conference	School
America East	Stony Brook
American	South Florida
Atlantic 10	St. Bonaventure
ACC	Miami (FL)
Atlantic Sun	Stetson
Big 12	TCU
Big East	Creighton
Big Sky	Southern Utah
Big South	High Point
Big Ten	Minnesota
Big West	Cal Poly
Colonial	Delaware
C-USA	Southern Miss
Horizon	Green Bay
Ivy League	Princeton
MAAC	Iona
MAC	Bowling Green
MEAC	North Carolina A&T
Missouri Valley	Indiana State
Mountain West	Colorado State
Northeast	Mount St. Mary's
Ohio Valley	Belmont
Pac-12	Washington
Patriot	Navy
SEC	Auburn
Southern	Furman
Southland	Lamar
SWAC	Texas Southern
Summit	South Dakota State
Sun Belt	Arkansas State
WCC	Pacific
WAC	Cal State Bakersfield

=== At-large bids ===
School	Conference
American	Patriot
Ball State	MAC
Butler	Big East
Central Michigan	MAC
Charlotte	C-USA
Colorado	Pac-12
Duquesne	Atlantic 10
East Carolina	C-USA
George Washington	Atlantic 10
Harvard	Ivy
Hawaii	Big West
Indiana	Big Ten
IUPUI	Summit
Marquette	Big East
Michigan	Big Ten
Mississippi State	SEC
Missouri	SEC
Montana	Big Sky
Northwestern	Big Ten
Old Dominion	C-USA
Oregon	Pac-12
Quinnipiac	MAAC
Rutgers	American
Saint Mary's	West Coast
San Diego	West Coast
Seton Hall	Big East
SMU	American
Tulane	C-USA
UTEP	C-USA
VCU	Atlantic 10
Villanova	Big East
Washington State	Pac-12

== Bracket ==
=== Region 1 ===
Round 1 March 19–21
Washington	67
Hawaii	50
Oregon	92
Pacific	63
Montana	90
Washington State	78
San Diego	82
Cal Poly	59
Colorado State	56
Southern Utah	71
Colorado	78
TCU	71
Saint Mary's	75
Cal State Bakersfield	68
UTEP	74
Arkansas State	64

Round 2 March 22–25
Washington	93
Oregon	85
Montana	57
San Diego	60
Southern Utah	68
Colorado	79
St. Mary's	64
UTEP	76

Round 3 March 26–28
Washington	62
San Diego	55
Colorado	60
UTEP	68

Quarterfinals; March 29–31
Washington	63
UTEP	70

Home teams are listed first, unless noted.
* = Overtime
Colorado, Oregon, and UTEP will host 2nd Round games.

=== Region 2 ===
Round 1 March 19–21
Minnesota	62
Green Bay	60
SMU	84
Texas Southern	78
South Dakota State	78
Butler	61
Creighton	77
Missouri	51
Indiana State	61
Marquette	63
Indiana	48
Belmont	47
Northwestern	69
Ball State	65
Central Michigan	66
IUPUI	72

Round 2 March 22–25
Minnesota	77
SMU	70
South Dakota State	62
Creighton	51
Marquette	69
Indiana	72
Northwestern	88
IUPUI	52

Round 3 March 26–28
Minnesota	62
South Dakota State	70
Indiana	66
Northwestern	65

Quarterfinals; March 29–31
South Dakota State	76
Indiana	64

Home teams are listed first, unless noted.
* = Overtime
Indiana will host Marquette in Round 2.
South Dakota State will host Minnesota in Round 3.

=== Region 3 ===
Round 1 March 19–21
Michigan	86
Stony Brook	48
Duquesne	62
Mount St. Mary's	52
Bowling Green	72
High Point	62
St. Bonaventure	81
Charlotte	62
Iona	89
Harvard	90
Rutgers	65
Delaware	61
Princeton	94
VCU	76
Seton Hall	63
American	60

Round 2 March 22–25
Michigan	68
Duquesne	52
Bowling Green	76
St. Bonaventure	65
Harvard	52
Rutgers	63
Princeton	74
Seton Hall	75

Round 3 March 26–28
Michigan	53
Bowling Green	65
Rutgers	91**
Seton Hall	79

Quarterfinals; March 29–31
Bowling Green	50
Rutgers	55

Home teams are listed first, unless noted.
* = Overtime
Rutgers and Seton Hall will host Round 2 games.

=== Region 4 ===
Round 1 March 19–21
Mississippi State	77
Tulane	68
Southern Miss	75
Lamar	60
Auburn	78
Furman	64
Old Dominion	68
Navy	60
Villanova	74
Quinnipiac	66
George Washington	86
East Carolina	68
South Florida	56
North Carolina A&T	50
Miami	63
Stetson	70

Round 2 March 22–25
Mississippi State	74**
Southern Miss	66
Auburn	82
Old Dominion	59
Villanova	66
George Washington	76
South Florida	75
Stetson	56

Round 3 March 26–28
Mississippi State	59
Auburn	54
George Washington	59
South Florida	79

Quarterfinals; March 29–31
Mississippi State	58
South Florida	60

Home teams are listed first, unless noted.
* = Overtime
South Florida will host George Washington in Round 3.

=== Semifinals and championship game ===
Semifinals; April 2
UTEP	66
South Dakota State	63
South Florida	52
Rutgers	62

Championship Game; April 5 CBS Sports Network
UTEP	54
Rutgers	56

Home teams are listed first, unless noted.
* = Overtime

== All-tournament team ==
- Kahleah Copper, Rutgers (MVP)
- Tyler Scaife, Rutgers
- Kayla Thornton, UTEP
- Kristīne Vītola, UTEP
- Courtney Williams, South Florida
- Steph Paluch, South Dakota State

== See also ==
- 2014 National Invitation Tournament
