= 2013–14 Mid-American Conference women's basketball season =

- League: NCAA Division I
- Sport: Basketball
- Teams: 12

Regular season
- Champions: Bowling Green
- Runners-up: Central Michigan
- Season MVP: Crystal Bradford

Tournament
- Champions: Akron
- Runners-up: Ball State
- Finals MVP: Rachel Tecca

Mid-American women's basketball seasons
- ← 2012–13 2014–15 →

2013–14 Mid-American Conference women's basketball standings
	Conf.				Overall
Team	W		L	PCT	W		L	PCT
No. 25 Bowling Green	17	–	1	.944	30	–	5	.857
Akron†	14	–	4	.778	23	–	10	.697
Buffalo	10	–	8	.556	17	–	13	.567
Ohio	4	–	14	.222	9	–	21	.300
Kent State	4	–	14	.222	7	–	23	.233
Miami (OH)	4	–	14	.222	8	–	22	.267
West
Central Michigan	16	–	2	.889	20	–	12	.625
Ball State	9	–	9	.500	18	–	17	.514
Toledo	9	–	9	.500	16	–	16	.500
Western Michigan	8	–	10	.444	13	–	18	.419
Eastern Michigan	7	–	11	.389	18	–	14	.563
Northern Illinois	6	–	12	.333	11	–	19	.367
† 2014 MAC tournament winner As of March 22, 2014; Rankings from AP poll

The 2013–14 Mid-American Conference women's basketball season began with practices in October 2013, followed by the start of the 2013–14 NCAA Division I women's basketball season in November. Conference play began in January 2014 and concluded in March 2014. Bowling Green won the regular season title with a record of 17–1 by one game over Central Michigan. Crystal Bradford of Central Michigan was named MAC player of the year.

Third seeded Akron won the MAC tournament over fifth seeded Ball State. Rachel Tecca of Akron was the tournament MVP. Akron lost to Purdue in the first round of the NCAA tournament. Bowling Green, Central Michigan and Ball State played in the WNIT.

== Preseason awards ==
The preseason coaches' poll and league awards were announced by the league office on October 29, 2013.

=== Preseason women's basketball coaches poll ===
(First place votes in parentheses)

==== East Division ====
1. Akron (9)
2. Bowling Green (3)
3. Buffalo
4. Miami
5. Ohio
6. Kent State

==== West Division ====
1. Central Michigan (12)
2. Ball State
3. Toledo
4. Eastern Michigan
5. Western Michigan
6. Northern Illinois

==== Tournament champs ====
Central Michigan (9), Akron (1), Bowling Green (1), Miami (1)

=== Honors ===
Honor	Recipient
Preseason All-MAC East	Hanna Luburgh, Akron
Preseason All-MAC East	Rachel Tecca, Akron
Preseason All-MAC East	Alexis Rogers, Bowling Green
Preseason All-MAC East	Mackenzie Loesing, Buffalo
Preseason All-MAC East	Hannah Robertson, Miami
Preseason All-MAC West	Nathalie Fontaine, Ball State
Preseason All-MAC West	Crystal Bradford, Central Michigan
Preseason All-MAC West	Jessica Green, Central Michigan
Preseason All-MAC West	Andola Dortch, Toledo
Preseason All-MAC West	Inma Zanoguera, Toledo

== Postseason ==
=== Postseason awards ===
1. Coach of the Year: Jennifer Roos, Bowling Green
2. Player of the Year: Crystal Bradford, Central Michigan
3. Freshman of the Year: Cha Sweeney, Eastern Michigan
4. Defensive Player of the Year: Crystal Bradford, Central Michigan
5. Sixth Man of the Year: Taylor Johnson, Central Michigan

=== Honors ===
Honor	Recipient
Postseason All-MAC First Team	Hanna Luburgh, Akron, G
Postseason All-MAC First Team	Rachel Tecca, Akron, C
Postseason All-MAC First Team	Jillian Halfhill, Bowling Green, G
Postseason All-MAC First Team	Alexis Rogers, Bowling Green, F
Postseason All-MAC First Team	Crystal Bradford, Central Michigan, G/F
Postseason All-MAC Second Team	Nathalie Fontaine, Ball State, G
Postseason All-MAC Second Team	Mackenzie Loesing, Buffalo, G
Postseason All-MAC Second Team	Cha Sweeney, Eastern Michigan, G
Postseason All-MAC Second Team	Inma Zanoguera, Toledo, G/F
Postseason All-MAC Second Team	Miracle Woods, Western Michigan, F/C
Postseason All-MAC Third Team	Kristen Sharkey, Buffalo, F
Postseason All-MAC Third Team	Jas’Mine Bracey, Central Michigan, F
Postseason All-MAC Third Team	Niki DiGuilio, Central Michigan, G
Postseason All-MAC Third Team	Amanda Corral, Northern Illinois, G
Postseason All-MAC Third Team	Andola Dortch, Toledo, G
Postseason All-MAC Honorable Mention	Brandy Woody, Ball State, G
Postseason All-MAC Honorable Mention	Erica Donovan, Bowling Green, F
Postseason All-MAC Honorable Mention	Jessica Green, Central Michigan, G
Postseason All-MAC Honorable Mention	Kiyanna Black, Ohio, G
Postseason All-MAC Honorable Mention	Marquisha Harris, Western Michigan, F
All-MAC Freshman Team	Hannah Plybon, Akron, G
All-MAC Freshman Team	Alexus Malone, Buffalo F
All-MAC Freshman Team	Janay Morton, Eastern Michigan, G
All-MAC Freshman Team	Cha Sweeney, Eastern Michigan, G
All-MAC Freshman Team	Quiera Lampkins, Ohio, G

== See also ==
2013–14 Mid-American Conference men's basketball season
