= 2013–14 Ohio Bobcats women's basketball team =

Intercollegiate basketball season

2013–14 Ohio Bobcats women's basketball
- Conference: Mid-American Conference
- East Division
- Record: 9–21 (4–14 MAC)
- Head coach: Bob Boldon (1st season)
- Home arena: Convocation Center

2013–14 Mid-American Conference women's basketball standings
	Conf.				Overall
Team	W		L	PCT	W		L	PCT
No. 25 Bowling Green	17	–	1	.944	30	–	5	.857
Akron†	14	–	4	.778	23	–	10	.697
Buffalo	10	–	8	.556	17	–	13	.567
Ohio	4	–	14	.222	9	–	21	.300
Kent State	4	–	14	.222	7	–	23	.233
Miami (OH)	4	–	14	.222	8	–	22	.267
West
Central Michigan	16	–	2	.889	20	–	12	.625
Ball State	9	–	9	.500	18	–	17	.514
Toledo	9	–	9	.500	16	–	16	.500
Western Michigan	8	–	10	.444	13	–	18	.419
Eastern Michigan	7	–	11	.389	18	–	14	.563
Northern Illinois	6	–	12	.333	11	–	19	.367
† 2014 MAC tournament winner As of March 22, 2014; Rankings from AP poll

The 2013–14 Ohio Bobcats women's basketball team represented Ohio University during the 2013–14 NCAA Division I women's basketball season. The Bobcats, led by first year head coach Bob Boldon, played their home games at the Convocation Center in Athens, Ohio as a member of the Mid-American Conference. They finished the season 9–21 and 4–14 in MAC play.

== Preseason ==
The preseason coaches' poll and league awards were announced by the league office on October 29, 2013. Ohio was picked fifth in the MAC East.

=== Preseason women's basketball coaches poll ===
(First place votes in parentheses)

==== East Division ====
1. Akron (9)
2. Bowling Green (3)
3. Buffalo
4. Miami
5. Ohio
6. Kent State

==== West Division ====
1. Central Michigan (12)
2. Ball State
3. Toledo
4. Eastern Michigan
5. Western Michigan
6. Northern Illinois

==== Tournament champs ====
Central Michigan (9), Akron (1), Bowling Green (1), Miami (1)

== Schedule ==
Date time, TV	Rank^{#}	Opponent^{#}	Result	Record	Site (attendance) city, state
Non-conference regular season
Nov 10, 2013*		Xavier	W 94–88	1–0	
Nov 16, 2013*		at Morehead State	W 64–56 ^{OT}	2–0	
Nov 21, 2013*; 7:00 pm		at No. 4 Louisville	L 33–90	2–1	KFC Yum! Center (7,011); Louisville, KY
Nov 23, 2013*		at Eastern Kentucky	W 60–52	3–1	
Nov 29, 2013*		Illinois-Chicago; San Juan Shootout	L 67–76	3–2	Mario Morales Coliseu; Guaynabo, Puerto Rico
Nov 30, 2013*; 1:00 pm		No. 8 Maryland; San Juan Shootout	L 60–84	3–3	Mario Morales Coliseu; Guaynabo, Puerto Rico
Dec 5, 2013*		at Cleveland State	L 64–76	3–4	
Dec 14, 2013*		Notre Dame (OH)	W 72–55	4–4	
Dec 20, 2013*		at East Carolina	L 47–76	4–5	
Dec 29, 2013*		at James Madison	L 33–56	4–6	
Dec 30, 2013*		vs. UMBC	W 84–36	5–6	
MAC regular season
Jan 4, 2014		at Northern Illinois	L 51–74	5–7 (0–1)	
Jan 9, 2014		Miami (OH)	W 97–79	6–7 (1–1)	
Jan 12, 2014		Western Michigan	W 70–53	7–7 (2–1)	
Jan 15, 2014		at Kent State	W 76–59	8–7 (3–1)	
Jan 18, 2014		Ball State	L 63–79	8–8 (3–2)	
Jan 23, 2014		at Akron	L 56–80	8–9 (3–3)	
Jan 26, 2014		Toledo	L 62–64	8–10 (3–4)	
Jan 30, 2014		Bowling Green	L 62–78	8–11 (3–5)	
Feb 2, 2014		Central Michigan	L 63–80	8–12 (3–6)	
Feb 6, 2014		at Buffalo	L 43–55	8–13 (3–7)	
Feb 9, 2014		Eastern Michigan	L 55–68	8–14 (3–8)	
Feb 15, 2014		at Toledo	L 58–62	8–15 (3–9)	
Feb 19 2014		at Western Michigan	L 64–71	8–16 (3–10)	
Feb 22, 2014		Akron	L 76–88	8–17 (3–11)	
Feb 27, 2014		Buffalo	W 83–71	9–17 (4–11)	
Mar 2, 2014		at Bowling Green	L 39–63	9–18 (4–12)	
Mar 5, 2014		Kent State	L 64–69	9–19 (4–13)	
Mar 8, 2014		at Miami (OH)	L 63–68	9–20 (4–14)	
MAC Tournament
Mar 10, 2014		at Toledo	L 44–61	9–21	
*Non-conference game. ^{#}Rankings from AP Poll. (#) Tournament seedings in parentheses. All times are in Eastern Time.

== Awards and honors ==
=== All-MAC Awards ===
Postseason All-MAC teams
Team	Player	Position	Year
All-MAC Honorable Mention	Kiyanna Black	G	So.
All-MAC Freshman team	Quiera Lampkins	G	Fr.

== See also ==
2013–14 Ohio Bobcats men's basketball team
