= 2013–14 NCAA Division I women's basketball season =

American college basketball season

- Preseason AP No. 1: Connecticut
- Regular season: November 2013 - March 9, 2014
- NCAA Tournament: 2014
- Tournament dates: March 20 – April 8, 2014
- National Championship: Bridgestone Arena; Nashville, Tennessee
- NCAA Champions: Connecticut
- Other champions: Rutgers (WNIT); UIC (CBI)
- Player of the Year (Naismith, Wooden): Breanna Stewart (Naismith); Chiney Ogwumike (Wooden); Odyssey Sims (Wade)

The 2013–14 NCAA Division I women's basketball season began in November and ended with the Final Four in Nashville, Tennessee April 6–8.

== Milestones and records ==
- December 16 – Stanford senior Chiney Ogwumike surpassed 2000 points and 1000 rebounds for her career. She eclipsed the scoring mark in a 32-point game against New Mexico. She became the fifth Cardinal women's player to reach the 2000/1000 milestone.
- December 29 – Wake Forest senior Chelsea Douglas broke the school's single-game scoring record. Douglas scored 48 points in a win over Florida International. The previous record of 40 points was held by Brittany Waters and Liz Strunk.
- Middle Tennessee forward Ebony Rowe, Nebraska forward Jordan Hooper, Maryland forward Alyssa Thomas and Louisville guard Shoni Schimmel each passed the 2,000 point mark for their careers.
- January 25 - University of Tennessee (Chattanooga)'s Jim Foster reached the 800 victory milestone in a game against Samford.
- February 12 - Kelsey Minato (Army) hit 26 of 26 free throw attempts in a game against Holy Cross, the most ever in NCAA history.
- April 8 – Connecticut played in their 40th game of the season, tying Baylor for the most games played in a season.

=== Coaching wins milestones ===
- 900 victories - Robin Selvig - University of Montana. November 19 versus Portland.
- 900 victories - Tara VanDerveer - Stanford University. November 27 versus Florida Gulf Coast.
- 800 victories - Jim Foster - Chattanooga. January 25 versus Florida Gulf Coast.
- 700 victories - Cindy Russo - Florida International University. February 5 versus Colgate.
- 500 victories - Kathy Delaney-Smith - Harvard University. November 23 versus Colgate.
- 500 victories - Joanne McCallie - Duke University. December 8 versus Oklahoma.

== Conference membership changes ==
The 2013–14 season saw the largest wave of membership changes resulting from a major realignment of NCAA Division I conferences. The cycle began in 2010 with the Big Ten and the then-Pac-10 publicly announcing their intentions to expand. The fallout from these conferences' moves later affected a majority of D-I conferences. The most significant developments this season were:

- The original Big East Conference split into football-sponsoring and non-football conferences. The non-football league now operates as the newly chartered Big East Conference, while the football-sponsoring league operates under the old charter as the renamed American Athletic Conference (The American).
- With The American adding four members in 2013 and three more in 2014, all from Conference USA (C-USA), the latter league responded by adding eight members in 2013, plus one more in 2014. Four of the 2013 C-USA arrivals came from the Sun Belt Conference, which itself added five schools (three in 2013 and two in 2014).
- The Western Athletic Conference saw near-total replacement of its membership. Only three schools that had been members in the 2012–13 season—Idaho, New Mexico State, and Seattle—remain in the WAC for 2013–14, and Idaho left for the Big Sky Conference after this season. The WAC's attempts to replenish its membership led to the demise of the Great West Conference.

In addition, four schools began the transition up from Division II starting this season. These schools were ineligible for NCAA-sponsored postseason play until completing their D-I transitions in 2017.

School	Former conference	New conference
Abilene Christian Wildcats	Lone Star (D-II)	Southland
Boston University Terriers	America East	Patriot League
Butler Bulldogs	Atlantic 10	Big East
Charleston Cougars	SoCon	CAA
Charlotte 49ers	Atlantic 10	C-USA
Chicago State Cougars	Great West	WAC
Cincinnati Bearcats	Original Big East	The American
Connecticut Huskies	Original Big East	The American
Creighton Bluejays	MVC	Big East
CSU Bakersfield Roadrunners	Division I independent	WAC
Denver Pioneers	WAC	The Summit
DePaul Blue Demons	Original Big East	Big East
Florida Atlantic Owls	Sun Belt	C-USA
FIU Panthers	Sun Belt	C-USA
George Mason Patriots	CAA	Atlantic 10
Georgetown Hoyas	Original Big East	Big East
Georgia State Panthers	CAA	Sun Belt
Grand Canyon Antelopes	PacWest (D-II)	WAC
Houston Cougars	C-USA	The American
Houston Baptist Huskies	Great West	Southland
Incarnate Word Cardinals	Lone Star (D-II)	Southland
Louisiana Tech Lady Techsters	WAC	C-USA
Louisville Cardinals	Original Big East	The American
Loyola Chicago Ramblers	Horizon League	MVC
Loyola (MD) Greyhounds	MAAC	Patriot League
Marquette Golden Eagles	Original Big East	Big East
Memphis Tigers	C-USA	The American
Middle Tennessee Blue Raiders	Sun Belt	C-USA
Monmouth Hawks	NEC	MAAC
New Orleans Privateers	Division I independent	Southland
NJIT Highlanders	Great West	Division I independent
North Texas Mean Green	Sun Belt	C-USA
Notre Dame Fighting Irish	Original Big East	ACC
Oakland Golden Grizzlies	The Summit	Horizon
Old Dominion Monarchs	CAA	C-USA
Pacific Tigers	Big West	WCC
Pittsburgh Panthers	Original Big East	ACC
Providence Friars	Original Big East	Big East
Quinnipiac Bobcats	NEC	MAAC
Rutgers Scarlet Knights	Original Big East	The American
St. John's Red Storm	Original Big East	Big East
San Jose State Spartans	WAC	MW
Seton Hall Pirates	Original Big East	Big East
SMU Mustangs	C-USA	The American
South Florida Bulls	Original Big East	The American
Syracuse Orange	Original Big East	ACC
Temple Owls	Atlantic 10	The American
Texas–Arlington Mavericks	WAC	Sun Belt
Texas State Bobcats	WAC	Sun Belt
UCF Knights	C-USA	The American
UMass Lowell River Hawks	NE-10 (D-II)	America East
UMKC Kangaroos	The Summit	WAC
Utah State Aggies	WAC	MW
Utah Valley Wolverines	Great West	WAC
UTPA Broncs	Great West	WAC
UTSA Roadrunners	WAC	C-USA
Villanova Wildcats	Original Big East	Big East
Xavier Musketeers	Atlantic 10	Big East

The 2013–14 season was also the last for several other teams in their current conferences:

- Four schools left the Southern Conference (SoCon). Appalachian State and Georgia Southern left for the Sun Belt, Davidson for the Atlantic 10, and Elon for the CAA.
- East Tennessee State and Mercer left the Atlantic Sun Conference for the SoCon.
- East Carolina, Tulane, and Tulsa left C-USA for The American.
- As noted above, Idaho left the WAC and returned its non-football sports to the Big Sky Conference (after an 18-year absence).
- Louisville and Rutgers both spent only one season in The American; they respectively left for the ACC and Big Ten.
- Maryland left the ACC for the Big Ten.
- Oral Roberts left the Southland and returned to the Summit.
- Western Kentucky left the Sun Belt for C-USA.

== New arenas ==
- The Nebraska Cornhuskers left their home since 1976, the on-campus Bob Devaney Sports Center, for the new Pinnacle Bank Arena in downtown Lincoln.
- The Towson Tigers also left behind a venue that they had occupied since 1976, the Towson Center. Unlike Nebraska, Towson stayed on campus in the new Tiger Arena.
- The four Division I newcomers all chose to use existing on-campus venues:
  - Abilene Christian – Moody Coliseum
  - Grand Canyon – Grand Canyon University Arena
  - Incarnate Word – McDermott Convocation Center
  - UMass Lowell – The River Hawks' main basketball venue is Costello Athletic Center. Another on-campus venue, the Tsongas Center, normally home to the school's ice hockey team, is available for games requiring a larger capacity.

== Major rule changes ==
- The 10-second rule in the backcourt, under which the offensive team must cross the midcourt line within 10 seconds of gaining possession in the backcourt, was introduced to the women's game for the first time. Previously, women's college basketball had been the only level of basketball in the world without a timed backcourt rule.
- If a team calls a timeout within the 30 seconds preceding a scheduled media timeout (the first dead ball after the 16-, 12-, 8-, and 4-minute marks), the called timeout will replace the scheduled media timeout. The only exception to this new rule is the first timeout called by either team in the second half. This change was made only in the women's game; it did not become part of the men's game until the 2015–16 season.
- Expanded the use of video review as follows:
  - Shot-clock violations and who caused the ball to go out-of-bounds in the final 2:00 of regulation or overtime.
  - Determine if a field goal is worth two points or three in the final 4:00 of regulation or in the entire overtime period. Any other such review must wait until the next media timeout (at that time, 16:00, 12:00 and 8:00 as well as the final 4:00 of the first half; since 2015–16, media timeouts take place at the 5:00 mark of each quarter).
- Change the block/charge rule to not permit a defender from sliding in front of an offensive player at the last second to draw a charge. The defender must be in position when the offensive player begins his upward flight with the ball.
- Increasing emphasis on hand-checking or extended arms on defense.
- Permit the use of video review to determine if an elbow delivered above the shoulders of an opponent warrants a flagrant-1 or -2 foul (as was previously the case), a player control foul, or no call.

== Season outlook ==
=== Pre-season polls ===
The top 25 from the AP and USA Today Coaches Polls.

Associated Press
Ranking	Team
1	Connecticut (36)
2	Duke
3	Stanford
4	Tennessee
5	Louisville
6	Notre Dame
7	Kentucky
8	Maryland
9	Cal
10	Baylor
11	Oklahoma
12	North Carolina
13	Penn State
14	Dayton
15	LSU
16	Texas A&M
17	Nebraska
18	Purdue
19	Colorado
20	Michigan State
21	Oklahoma State
22	South Carolina
23	Iowa State
24	Georgia
25	Gonzaga

USA Today Coaches
Ranking	Team
1	Connecticut (31)
2	Duke
3	Stanford
4	Tennessee (1)
5	Louisville
6	Maryland
7	Notre Dame
8	Kentucky
9	Cal
10	Baylor
11	North Carolina
12	Nebraska
13	Texas A&M
14	Oklahoma
15	Penn State
16	Dayton
17	LSU
18	Michigan State
19	Colorado
20	Iowa State
21	South Carolina
22	Georgia
23	Purdue
24	Oklahoma State
25	UCLA

== Conference standings ==
2013–14 American Athletic Conference women's basketball standings
	Conf.				Overall
Team	W		L	PCT	W		L	PCT
No. 1 UConn†	18	–	0	1.000	40	–	0	1.000
No. 4 Louisville	16	–	2	.889	33	–	5	.868
South Florida	13	–	5	.722	23	–	13	.639
Rutgers	12	–	6	.667	28	–	9	.757
SMU	8	–	10	.444	18	–	14	.563
Temple	8	–	10	.444	14	–	16	.467
Memphis	6	–	12	.333	13	–	18	.419
Cincinnati	5	–	13	.278	13	–	18	.419
UCF	3	–	15	.167	10	–	20	.333
Houston	1	–	17	.056	6	–	25	.194
† American Tournament winner winner As of 8 April 2014; Rankings from AP poll

2013–14 America East Conference women's basketball standings
	Conf.				Overall
Team	W		L	PCT	W		L	PCT
Albany†	15	–	1	.938	28	–	5	.848
Stony Brook	13	–	3	.813	24	–	9	.727
New Hampshire	12	–	4	.750	19	–	12	.613
Maine	10	–	6	.625	17	–	15	.531
Hartford	9	–	7	.563	13	–	18	.419
Vermont	4	–	12	.250	7	–	23	.233
UMass Lowell*	4	–	12	.250	5	–	23	.179
UMBC	3	–	13	.188	4	–	25	.138
Binghamton	2	–	14	.125	5	–	25	.167
† 2014 America East tournament winner As of 10:03, 1 April 2014 (UTC); Rankings from AP poll *ineligible for postseason play due to Div. I transitions

2013–14 Atlantic 10 women's basketball standings
	Conf.				Overall
Team	W		L	PCT	W		L	PCT
Dayton	14	–	2	.875	23	–	8	.742
St. Bonaventure	11	–	5	.688	24	–	11	.686
Fordham†	11	–	5	.688	25	–	8	.758
George Washington	11	–	5	.688	23	–	11	.676
Saint Joseph's	10	–	6	.625	23	–	10	.697
Duquesne	10	–	6	.625	20	–	13	.606
La Salle	9	–	7	.563	15	–	15	.500
VCU	9	–	7	.563	22	–	10	.688
Richmond	8	–	8	.500	14	–	16	.467
Saint Louis	7	–	9	.438	12	–	18	.400
Rhode Island	2	–	14	.125	7	–	23	.233
George Mason	1	–	15	.063	8	–	23	.258
UMass	1	–	15	.063	4	–	27	.129
† 2014 A10 Tournament winner As of 10:03, 1 April 2014 (UTC); Rankings from AP poll

2013–14 Atlantic Sun women's basketball standings
	Conf.				Overall
Team	W		L	PCT	W		L	PCT
FGCU†	17	–	1	.944	26	–	8	.765
Stetson	16	–	2	.889	27	–	8	.771
Northern Kentucky*	13	–	5	.722	18	–	13	.581
USC Upstate	11	–	7	.611	17	–	15	.531
Jacksonville	10	–	8	.556	13	–	17	.433
Mercer	9	–	9	.500	17	–	14	.548
East Tennessee State	5	–	13	.278	9	–	21	.300
Kennesaw State	4	–	14	.222	6	–	24	.200
Lipscomb	3	–	15	.167	6	–	24	.200
North Florida	2	–	16	.111	6	–	23	.207
† 2014 Atlantic Sun Tournament *ineligible for postseason play due to Div. I transition winner As of March 16, 2014; Rankings from AP Poll

2013–14 ACC women's basketball standings
	Conf.				Overall
Team	W		L	PCT	W		L	PCT
No. 2 Notre Dame †	16	–	0	1.000	37	–	1	.974
No. 9 Duke	12	–	4	.750	28	–	7	.800
No. 11 Maryland	12	–	4	.750	28	–	7	.800
No. 16 NC State	11	–	5	.688	25	–	8	.758
Syracuse	10	–	6	.625	23	–	10	.697
No. 12 North Carolina	10	–	6	.625	27	–	10	.730
Georgia Tech	9	–	7	.563	20	–	12	.625
Miami (FL)	8	–	8	.500	16	–	15	.516
Florida State	7	–	9	.438	21	–	12	.636
Virginia	6	–	10	.375	14	–	17	.452
Wake Forest	5	–	11	.313	15	–	16	.484
Virginia Tech	4	–	12	.250	14	–	16	.467
Clemson	4	–	12	.250	13	–	19	.406
Pittsburgh	3	–	13	.188	11	–	20	.355
Boston College	3	–	13	.188	12	–	19	.387
† 2014 ACC tournament winner As of 8 April 2014; Rankings from AP poll

2013–14 Big East Conference women's basketball standings
	Conf.				Overall
Team	W		L	PCT	W		L	PCT
No. 23 DePaul†	15	–	3	.833	29	–	7	.806
St. John's	13	–	5	.722	23	–	11	.676
Creighton	12	–	6	.667	20	–	14	.588
Villanova	12	–	6	.667	23	–	9	.719
Marquette	11	–	7	.611	22	–	11	.667
Butler	10	–	8	.556	15	–	16	.484
Seton Hall	8	–	10	.444	20	–	14	.588
Georgetown	4	–	14	.222	11	–	21	.344
Xavier	3	–	15	.167	8	–	23	.258
Providence	2	–	16	.111	7	–	23	.233
† 2014 Big East Basketball Tournament winner As of March 11, 2014; Rankings from AP poll

2013–14 Big Sky women's basketball standings
	Conf.				Overall
Team	W		L	PCT	W		L	PCT
North Dakota†	15	–	5	.750	22	–	10	.688
Southern Utah	15	–	5	.750	23	–	10	.697
Montana	14	–	6	.700	23	–	11	.676
Eastern Washington	12	–	8	.600	16	–	14	.533
Idaho State	11	–	9	.550	14	–	17	.452
Montana State	10	–	10	.500	15	–	15	.500
Sacramento State	10	–	10	.500	18	–	12	.600
Northern Colorado	8	–	12	.400	14	–	15	.483
Northern Arizona	6	–	14	.300	9	–	20	.310
Portland State	6	–	14	.300	8	–	21	.276
Weber State	3	–	17	.150	7	–	22	.241
† 2014 Big Sky tournament winner As of 10:03, 1 April 2014 (UTC); Rankings from AP poll

2013–14 Big South women's basketball standings
	Conf.				Overall
Team	W		L	PCT	W		L	PCT
Liberty	15	–	5	.750	20	–	11	.645
High Point	16	–	4	.800	22	–	11	.667
Winthrop†	15	–	5	.750	24	–	9	.727
Campbell	13	–	7	.650	19	–	12	.613
Gardner-Webb	11	–	9	.550	16	–	14	.533
Coastal Carolina	10	–	10	.500	15	–	16	.484
Presbyterian	9	–	11	.450	12	–	19	.387
UNC Asheville	7	–	13	.350	11	–	20	.355
Radford	5	–	15	.250	7	–	23	.233
Longwood	5	–	15	.250	8	–	22	.267
Charleston Southern	4	–	16	.200	8	–	22	.267
† 2014 Big South tournament winner Rankings from AP poll

2013–14 Big Ten women's basketball standings
	Conf.				Overall
Team	W		L	PCT	W		L	PCT
No. 14 Penn State	13	–	3	.813	24	–	8	.750
No. 20 Michigan State	13	–	3	.813	23	–	10	.697
No. 13 Nebraska †	12	–	4	.750	26	–	7	.788
No. 17 Purdue	11	–	5	.688	22	–	9	.710
No. 19 Iowa	11	–	5	.688	27	–	9	.750
Minnesota	8	–	8	.500	22	–	13	.629
Michigan	8	–	8	.500	20	–	14	.588
Indiana	5	–	11	.313	21	–	13	.618
Northwestern	5	–	11	.313	17	–	16	.515
Ohio State	5	–	11	.313	17	–	18	.486
Wisconsin	3	–	13	.188	10	–	19	.345
Illinois	2	–	14	.125	9	–	21	.300
† 2014 Big Ten tournament winner As of 10:03, 1 April 2014 (UTC); Rankings from AP poll

2013–14 Big West women's basketball standings
	Conf.				Overall
Team	W		L	PCT	W		L	PCT
Cal State Northridge†	12	–	4	.750	18	–	15	.545
Cal Poly	11	–	5	.688	18	–	14	.563
Hawaii	10	–	6	.625	17	–	14	.548
UC Irvine	9	–	7	.563	17	–	15	.531
UC Davis	9	–	7	.563	15	–	16	.484
Long Beach State	8	–	8	.500	17	–	15	.531
Cal State Fullerton	8	–	8	.500	12	–	18	.400
UC Santa Barbara	3	–	13	.188	8	–	22	.267
UC Riverside	2	–	14	.125	6	–	23	.207
† 2014 Big West tournament winner As of 10:03, 1 April 2014 (UTC); Rankings from AP poll

2013–14 Big 12 Conference women's basketball standings
	Conf.				Overall
Team	W		L	PCT	W		L	PCT
No. 5 Baylor †	16	–	2	.889	32	–	5	.865
No. 7 West Virginia	16	–	2	.889	30	–	5	.857
Texas	11	–	7	.611	22	–	12	.647
No. 21 Oklahoma State	11	–	7	.611	25	–	9	.735
Iowa State	9	–	9	.500	20	–	11	.645
Oklahoma	9	–	9	.500	18	–	15	.545
TCU	8	–	10	.444	18	–	15	.545
Kansas	5	–	13	.278	13	–	19	.406
Kansas State	5	–	13	.278	11	–	19	.367
Texas Tech	0	–	18	.000	6	–	24	.200
† 2014 Big 12 Tournament winner Rankings from AP poll

2013–14 CAA women's basketball standings
	Conf.				Overall
Team	W		L	PCT	W		L	PCT
James Madison†	15	–	1	.938	29	–	6	.829
Delaware	10	–	6	.625	20	–	11	.645
Charleston	9	–	7	.563	19	–	15	.559
Drexel	9	–	7	.563	15	–	16	.484
Hofstra	8	–	8	.500	14	–	15	.483
Towson	7	–	9	.438	13	–	17	.433
Northeastern	6	–	10	.375	12	–	18	.400
William & Mary	5	–	11	.313	8	–	21	.276
UNC Wilmington	3	–	13	.188	5	–	27	.156
† 2014 CAA tournament winner Rankings from AP poll

2013–14 Conference USA women's basketball standings
	Conf.				Overall
Team	W		L	PCT	W		L	PCT
No. 22 Middle Tennessee†	15	–	1	.938	29	–	5	.853
Southern Miss	13	–	3	.813	27	–	7	.794
UTEP	12	–	4	.750	29	–	8	.784
Tulane	11	–	5	.688	20	–	11	.645
East Carolina	10	–	6	.625	22	–	9	.710
Charlotte	9	–	7	.563	15	–	16	.484
Old Dominion	9	–	7	.563	18	–	16	.529
UAB	7	–	9	.438	16	–	15	.516
Florida Atlantic	6	–	10	.375	16	–	14	.533
Tulsa	6	–	10	.375	12	–	16	.429
Rice	6	–	10	.375	13	–	17	.433
FIU	6	–	10	.375	15	–	18	.455
North Texas	6	–	10	.375	12	–	18	.400
Louisiana Tech	5	–	11	.313	12	–	20	.375
UTSA	4	–	12	.250	14	–	17	.452
Marshall	3	–	13	.188	11	–	20	.355
† 2014 C-USA tournament winner As of 10:03, 1 April 2014 (UTC); Rankings from AP poll

2013–14 Horizon League women's basketball standings
	Conf.				Overall
Team	W		L	PCT	W		L	PCT
Green Bay	13	–	3	.813	22	–	10	.688
Wright State†	12	–	4	.750	26	–	9	.743
Youngstown State	10	–	6	.625	15	–	16	.484
Illinois-Chicago	10	–	6	.625	26	–	9	.743
Cleveland State	9	–	7	.563	14	–	16	.467
Oakland	8	–	8	.500	13	–	17	.433
Milwaukee	4	–	12	.250	8	–	22	.267
Detroit	3	–	13	.188	6	–	24	.200
Valparaiso	3	–	13	.188	6	–	25	.194
† 2014 Horizon League Tournament winner As of 10:03, 1 April 2014 (UTC); Rankings from AP poll

2013–14 Ivy League women's basketball standings
	Conf.				Overall
Team	W		L	PCT	W		L	PCT
Penn†	12	–	2	.857	22	–	7	.759
Harvard	11	–	3	.786	22	–	8	.733
Princeton	11	–	3	.786	21	–	9	.700
Yale	7	–	7	.500	13	–	15	.464
Cornell	6	–	8	.429	14	–	14	.500
Brown	4	–	10	.286	10	–	18	.357
Columbia	3	–	11	.214	6	–	22	.214
Dartmouth	2	–	12	.143	5	–	23	.179
† Ivy League winner Rankings from AP Poll

2013–14 Mid-American Conference women's basketball standings
	Conf.				Overall
Team	W		L	PCT	W		L	PCT
No. 25 Bowling Green	17	–	1	.944	30	–	5	.857
Akron†	14	–	4	.778	23	–	10	.697
Buffalo	10	–	8	.556	17	–	13	.567
Ohio	4	–	14	.222	9	–	21	.300
Kent State	4	–	14	.222	7	–	23	.233
Miami (OH)	4	–	14	.222	8	–	22	.267
West
Central Michigan	16	–	2	.889	20	–	12	.625
Ball State	9	–	9	.500	18	–	17	.514
Toledo	9	–	9	.500	16	–	16	.500
Western Michigan	8	–	10	.444	13	–	18	.419
Eastern Michigan	7	–	11	.389	18	–	14	.563
Northern Illinois	6	–	12	.333	11	–	19	.367
† 2014 MAC tournament winner As of March 22, 2014; Rankings from AP poll

2013–14 MAAC women's basketball standings
	Conf.				Overall
Team	W		L	PCT	W		L	PCT
Iona	18	–	2	.900	26	–	6	.813
Marist†	18	–	2	.900	27	–	7	.794
Fairfield	15	–	5	.750	22	–	11	.667
Quinnipiac	13	–	6	.684	21	–	13	.618
Canisius	9	–	11	.450	13	–	17	.433
Rider	9	–	11	.450	15	–	17	.469
Manhattan	8	–	12	.400	9	–	21	.300
Niagara	8	–	12	.400	10	–	20	.333
Monmouth	6	–	14	.300	8	–	25	.242
Siena	3	–	17	.150	9	–	22	.290
St. Peter's	2	–	18	.100	3	–	27	.100
† 2014 MAAC tournament winner As of 10:03, 1 April 2014 (UTC); Rankings from AP poll

2013–14 MEAC women's basketball standings
	Conf.				Overall
Team	W		L	PCT	W		L	PCT
Hampton†	16	–	0	1.000	28	–	5	.848
North Carolina A&T	13	–	3	.813	24	–	7	.774
Coppin State	12	–	4	.750	17	–	14	.548
Florida A&M	10	–	6	.625	17	–	14	.548
Savannah State	10	–	6	.625	19	–	14	.576
Norfolk State	8	–	8	.500	12	–	16	.429
Bethune-Cookman	8	–	8	.500	12	–	18	.400
Howard	6	–	10	.375	11	–	20	.355
North Carolina Central	6	–	10	.375	11	–	19	.367
South Carolina State	5	–	11	.313	7	–	20	.259
Maryland-Eastern Shore	4	–	12	.250	9	–	21	.300
Morgan State	3	–	13	.188	5	–	25	.167
Delaware State	3	–	13	.188	8	–	21	.276
† 2014 MEAC tournament winner As of 10:03, 1 April 2014 (UTC); Rankings from AP poll

2013–14 Missouri Valley Conference women's basketball standings
	Conf.				Overall
Team	W		L	PCT	W		L	PCT
Indiana State	14	–	4	.778	20	–	12	.625
Wichita State†	14	–	4	.778	26	–	7	.788
Northern Iowa	13	–	5	.722	17	–	13	.567
Evansville	10	–	8	.556	15	–	16	.484
Drake	9	–	9	.500	17	–	15	.531
Missouri State	8	–	10	.444	14	–	17	.452
Illinois State	8	–	10	.444	10	–	20	.333
Loyola (IL)	6	–	12	.333	11	–	21	.344
Bradley	5	–	13	.278	8	–	22	.267
Southern Illinois	3	–	15	.167	5	–	25	.167
† 2014 MVC tournament winner As of April 1, 2014; Rankings from AP poll

2013–14 Mountain West Conference women's basketball standings
	Conf.				Overall
Team	W		L	PCT	W		L	PCT
Colorado State	15	–	3	.833	25	–	8	.758
Fresno State†	13	–	5	.722	22	–	11	.667
Nevada	12	–	6	.667	18	–	13	.581
Boise State	12	–	6	.667	18	–	14	.563
Wyoming	10	–	8	.556	20	–	11	.645
San Diego State	9	–	9	.500	13	–	17	.433
UNLV	9	–	9	.500	13	–	19	.406
Utah State	8	–	10	.444	15	–	16	.484
New Mexico	6	–	12	.333	11	–	19	.367
San Jose State	5	–	13	.278	11	–	19	.367
Air Force	0	–	18	.000	1	–	28	.034
† 2014 MWC tournament winner As of March 22, 2014; Rankings from AP poll

2013–14 Northeast Conference women's basketball standings
	Conf.				Overall
Team	W		L	PCT	W		L	PCT
Robert Morris†	14	–	4	.778	21	–	12	.636
Mount St. Mary's	13	–	5	.722	19	–	14	.576
Saint Francis (PA)	11	–	7	.611	15	–	17	.469
Bryant	11	–	7	.611	17	–	15	.531
St. Francis Brooklyn	10	–	8	.556	19	–	11	.633
Sacred Heart	9	–	9	.500	12	–	18	.400
Wagner	8	–	10	.444	9	–	21	.300
LIU Brooklyn	7	–	11	.389	9	–	21	.300
Central Connecticut	5	–	13	.278	11	–	17	.393
Fairleigh Dickinson	2	–	16	.111	3	–	26	.103
† 2014 NEC tournament winner As of 10:03, 1 April 2014 (UTC); Rankings from AP poll

2013–14 Ohio Valley Conference women's basketball standings
	Conf.				Overall
Team	W		L	PCT	W		L	PCT
West
UT Martin†	15	–	1	.938	24	–	8	.750
SIU Edwardsville	7	–	9	.438	11	–	19	.367
Eastern Illinois	7	–	9	.438	12	–	16	.429
Southeast Missouri State	6	–	10	.375	10	–	19	.345
Austin Peay	6	–	10	.375	9	–	20	.310
Murray State	4	–	12	.250	11	–	17	.393
East
Belmont	10	–	6	.625	14	–	18	.438
Tennessee Tech	9	–	7	.563	12	–	18	.400
Tennessee State	9	–	7	.563	12	–	18	.400
Eastern Kentucky	9	–	7	.563	17	–	13	.567
Jacksonville State	8	–	8	.500	14	–	18	.438
Morehead State	6	–	10	.375	12	–	17	.414
† 2014 OVC tournament winner As of March 22, 2014; Rankings from AP poll

2013–14 Pac-12 Conference women's basketball standings
	Conf.				Overall
Team	W		L	PCT	W		L	PCT
No. 6 Stanford	17	–	1	.944	33	–	4	.892
No. 24 California	13	–	5	.722	22	–	10	.688
Oregon State	13	–	5	.722	24	–	11	.686
Arizona State	11	–	7	.611	23	–	10	.697
USC †	11	–	7	.611	22	–	13	.629
Washington	10	–	8	.556	20	–	14	.588
Washington State	9	–	9	.500	17	–	17	.500
UCLA	7	–	11	.389	13	–	18	.419
Colorado	6	–	12	.333	19	–	15	.559
Oregon	6	–	12	.333	16	–	16	.500
Utah	4	–	14	.222	12	–	19	.387
Arizona	1	–	17	.056	5	–	25	.167
† 2014 Pac-12 Tournament winner As of 6 April 2014; Rankings from AP poll

2013–14 Patriot League women's basketball standings
	Conf.				Overall
Team	W		L	PCT	W		L	PCT
Navy	15	–	3	.833	24	–	8	.750
Army†	14	–	4	.778	25	–	8	.758
American U	14	–	4	.778	22	–	10	.688
Bucknell	11	–	7	.611	16	–	14	.533
Holy Cross	10	–	8	.556	20	–	12	.625
Lafayette	8	–	10	.444	14	–	16	.467
Boston U	7	–	11	.389	13	–	20	.394
Lehigh	5	–	13	.278	13	–	18	.419
Colgate	4	–	14	.222	8	–	22	.267
Loyola (MD)	2	–	16	.111	5	–	25	.167
† 2014 Patriot League tournament winner As of 10:03, 1 April 2014 (UTC); Rankings from AP poll

2013–14 SEC women's basketball standings
	Conf.				Overall
Team	W		L	PCT	W		L	PCT
No. 8 South Carolina	14	–	2	.875	29	–	5	.853
No. 3 Tennessee †	13	–	3	.813	29	–	6	.829
No. 15 Texas A&M	13	–	3	.813	27	–	9	.750
No. 10 Kentucky	10	–	6	.625	26	–	9	.743
Florida	8	–	8	.500	20	–	13	.606
Georgia	7	–	9	.438	20	–	12	.625
LSU	7	–	9	.438	21	–	13	.618
Vanderbilt	7	–	9	.438	18	–	13	.581
Auburn	7	–	9	.438	19	–	15	.559
Alabama	7	–	9	.438	14	–	16	.467
Arkansas	6	–	10	.375	19	–	11	.633
Missouri	6	–	10	.375	17	–	14	.548
Mississippi State	5	–	11	.313	22	–	14	.611
Ole Miss	2	–	14	.125	12	–	20	.375
† 2014 SEC tournament winner As of 10:03, 1 April 2014 (UTC); Rankings from AP poll

2013–14 Southern Conference women's basketball standings
	Conf.				Overall
Team	W		L	PCT	W		L	PCT
Chattanooga†	18	–	0	1.000	29	–	4	.879
Furman	12	–	6	.667	18	–	13	.581
Davidson	11	–	7	.611	16	–	16	.500
Appalachian State	10	–	8	.556	13	–	16	.448
Elon	10	–	8	.556	15	–	16	.484
Samford	8	–	10	.444	10	–	20	.333
Western Carolina	7	–	11	.389	15	–	17	.469
Georgia Southern	7	–	11	.389	10	–	21	.323
Wofford	4	–	14	.222	6	–	23	.207
UNC Greensboro	3	–	15	.167	7	–	23	.233
† 2014 SoCon Tournament winner As of April 1, 2014; Rankings from AP poll

2013–14 Southland Conference women's basketball standings
	Conf.				Overall
Team	W		L	PCT	W		L	PCT
Lamar	13	–	5	.722	18	–	13	.581
Stephen F. Austin	13	–	5	.722	23	–	13	.639
Central Arkansas	12	–	6	.667	18	–	12	.600
Northwestern State†	11	–	7	.611	21	–	13	.618
Nicholls State	11	–	7	.611	17	–	14	.548
Texas A&M-CC	11	–	7	.611	18	–	12	.600
Abilene Christian*	8	–	6	.571	18	–	12	.600
McNeese State	10	–	8	.556	19	–	14	.576
Oral Roberts	8	–	10	.444	9	–	20	.310
Houston Baptist	8	–	10	.444	12	–	17	.414
Sam Houston State	8	–	10	.444	13	–	16	.448
Southeastern Louisiana	7	–	11	.389	8	–	22	.267
Incarnate Word*	2	–	12	.143	8	–	19	.296
New Orleans**	0	–	18	.000	0	–	29	.000
† 2014 Southland tournament winner As of March 22, 2014 *ineligible for postseason play due to Div. I transition **ineligible for postseason play due to APR penalties Rankings from AP poll

2013–14 SWAC women's basketball standings
	Conf.				Overall
Team	W		L	PCT	W		L	PCT
Southern	16	–	2	.889	20	–	8	.714
Texas Southern	15	–	3	.833	20	–	13	.606
Jackson State	12	–	6	.667	15	–	15	.500
Prairie View A&M†	11	–	7	.611	14	–	18	.438
Alabama State	9	–	9	.500	16	–	14	.533
Mississippi Valley State	8	–	10	.444	9	–	21	.300
Grambling State	7	–	11	.389	11	–	20	.355
Alcorn State	7	–	11	.389	8	–	22	.267
Alabama A&M	3	–	15	.167	6	–	24	.200
Arkansas-Pine Bluff	2	–	16	.111	3	–	26	.103
† 2014 SWAC tournament winner As of 10:03, 1 April 2014 (UTC); Rankings from AP poll

2013–14 Sun Belt Conference women's basketball standings
	Conf.				Overall
Team	W		L	PCT	W		L	PCT
Arkansas State	14	–	4	.778	22	–	12	.647
Western Kentucky †	13	–	5	.722	24	–	9	.727
Arkansas–Little Rock	12	–	6	.667	18	–	12	.600
Texas State	12	–	6	.667	16	–	16	.500
Troy	8	–	10	.444	12	–	18	.400
Georgia State	8	–	10	.444	12	–	19	.387
Louisiana–Lafayette	7	–	11	.389	14	–	16	.467
Louisiana–Monroe	7	–	11	.389	11	–	20	.355
South Alabama	6	–	12	.333	8	–	20	.286
Texas–Arlington	3	–	15	.167	4	–	25	.138
† 2014 Sun Belt tournament winner

2013–14 Summit League women's basketball standings
	Conf.				Overall
Team	W		L	PCT	W		L	PCT
South Dakota State	13	–	1	.929	26	–	10	.722
IUPUI	11	–	3	.786	23	–	10	.697
IPFW	8	–	6	.571	15	–	15	.500
South Dakota†	7	–	7	.500	19	–	14	.576
Western Illinois	6	–	8	.429	14	–	16	.467
Denver	5	–	9	.357	9	–	23	.281
Omaha*	4	–	10	.286	12	–	16	.429
North Dakota State	2	–	12	.143	6	–	24	.200
† 2014 Summit League Tournament winner As of March 22, 2014; Rankings from AP Poll *ineligible for postseason due to Div. I transition

2013–14 West Coast Conference women's basketball standings
	Conf.				Overall
Team	W		L	PCT	W		L	PCT
No. 18 Gonzaga†	16	–	2	.889	29	–	5	.853
BYU	14	–	4	.778	28	–	7	.800
Pacific	12	–	6	.667	18	–	13	.581
Saint Mary's	11	–	7	.611	23	–	10	.697
San Diego	11	–	7	.611	24	–	9	.727
Portland	7	–	11	.389	14	–	16	.467
Santa Clara	6	–	12	.333	10	–	20	.333
San Francisco	6	–	12	.333	12	–	19	.387
Loyola Marymount	6	–	12	.333	9	–	21	.300
Pepperdine	1	–	17	.056	6	–	25	.194
† 2014 WCC tournament winner As of March 29, 2014; Rankings from AP Poll

2013–14 WAC women's basketball standings
	Conf.				Overall
Team	W		L	PCT	W		L	PCT
Idaho†	15	–	1	.938	25	–	9	.735
Cal State Bakersfield	12	–	4	.750	19	–	12	.613
Grand Canyon*	10	–	6	.625	21	–	9	.700
Seattle U	9	–	7	.563	16	–	16	.500
Texas-Pan American	8	–	8	.500	14	–	16	.467
New Mexico State	7	–	9	.438	11	–	20	.355
UMKC	7	–	9	.438	11	–	19	.367
Utah Valley	4	–	12	.250	7	–	23	.233
Chicago State	0	–	16	.000	3	–	27	.100
† 2014 WAC tournament winner As of March 22, 2014 * Grand Canyon ineligible for WAC Basketball Tournament as part of reclassification from Division II; Rankings from AP poll
