= 2013–14 Saint Mary's Gaels women's basketball team =

Intercollegiate basketball season

2013–14 Saint Mary's Gaels women's basketball

Hilton Concord Thanksgiving Classic Champions

WNIT, Second Round
- Conference: West Coast Conference
- Record: 23–10 (11–7 WCC)
- Head coach: Paul Thomas (8th season)
- Assistant coaches: Tracy Sanders; Allyson Fasnacht; Lisa O'Meara
- Home arena: McKeon Pavilion

2013–14 West Coast Conference women's basketball standings
	Conf.				Overall
Team	W		L	PCT	W		L	PCT
No. 18 Gonzaga†	16	–	2	.889	29	–	5	.853
BYU	14	–	4	.778	28	–	7	.800
Pacific	12	–	6	.667	18	–	13	.581
Saint Mary's	11	–	7	.611	23	–	10	.697
San Diego	11	–	7	.611	24	–	9	.727
Portland	7	–	11	.389	14	–	16	.467
Santa Clara	6	–	12	.333	10	–	20	.333
San Francisco	6	–	12	.333	12	–	19	.387
Loyola Marymount	6	–	12	.333	9	–	21	.300
Pepperdine	1	–	17	.056	6	–	25	.194
† 2014 WCC tournament winner As of March 29, 2014; Rankings from AP Poll

The 2013–14 Saint Mary's Gaels women's basketball team represented Saint Mary's College of California in the 2013–14 college basketball season. It was head coach Paul Thomas's eighth season at Saint Mary's. The Gaels, members of the West Coast Conference, played their home games at the McKeon Pavilion. They would finish the season 23–10, tying for fourth in the conference and making the WNIT.

== Before the season ==
A few coaching changes took place for the Gaels. Associate head coach Jesse Clark departed Saint Mary's to join San Diego State. To fill the vacancy, Tracy Sanders was moved from Assistant Coach to Associated Head Coach. To fill her vacancy, Lisa O'Meara was hired as a new assistant coach, moving up from being the Director of Basketball Operations at Saint Mary's.

== Roster ==
2013–14 Saint Mary's Gaels women's basketball team
Players
Coaches

Pos.	#	Name	Height	Year	Previous school	Hometown
G	1	Lauren Nicholson	6 ft 0 in (1.83 m)	So	Woolooware	Sydney, Australia
G	3	Jackie Nared	6 ft 1 in (1.85 m)	RS Sr	Westview; Wisconsin	Portland, OR
G	5	Hannah Kaser	5 ft 10 in (1.78 m)	So	St. Paul's Anglican	Leongatha, Australia
G	10	Kate Gaze	5 ft 8 in (1.73 m)	RS Sr	Australia Institute of Sport	Sydney, Australia
F	11	Valerie Moore	5 ft 10 in (1.78 m)	RS Fr	Modesto Christian	Merced, CA
F	12	Hayley Hendricksen	6 ft 0 in (1.83 m)	Jr	Lewis and Clark	Spokane, WA
G	14	Shannon Mauldin	5 ft 9 in (1.75 m)	So	Saint Mary's	San Pablo, CA
G	23	Alia McCoy	5 ft 11 in (1.8 m)	Fr	Canyon	Santa Clarita, CA
G	24	Samira McDonald	5 ft 9 in (1.75 m)	RS Fr	River Ridge	Lacey, WA
F	25	Carli Rosenthal	6 ft 3 in (1.91 m)	Jr	Coeur d'Alene	Coeur d'Alene, ID
F	30	Amanda Arter	6 ft 2 in (1.88 m)	Jr	Brea Olinda	Brea, CA
C	33	Sabrina Engelstad	6 ft 3 in (1.91 m)	Fr	Heritage	Brentwood, CA
F	54	Danielle Mauldin	6 ft 0 in (1.83 m)	Sr	Saint Mary's	Hercules, CA
G		Devyn Galland	5 ft 8 in (1.73 m)	So	Lewis and Clark; Oregon	Spokane, WA

Head coach

- Paul Thomas (Wayne State College)

Assistant coach(es)

- Tracy Sanders (St. Mary's)
- Allyson Fasnacht (Liberty)
- Lisa O'Meara (St. Mary's)

Legend

- (C) Team captain
- (S) Suspended
- (I) Ineligible
- (W) Walk-on
- Injured
- Current redshirt

Roster

== Schedule and results ==
Date time, TV	Rank^{#}	Opponent^{#}	Result	Record	Site city, state
Regular Season
11/08/2013*; 6:00 pm		Washington	W 91–81	1–0	McKeon Pavilion; Moraga, CA
11/10/2013*; 2:00 pm, Watch Big Sky		at Portland State	W 72–54	2–0	Stott Center; Portland, OR
11/16/2013*; 2:00 pm		at Butler	L 86–90 ^{OT}	3–0	Hinkle Fieldhouse; Indianapolis, IN
11/21/2013*; 7:00 pm		UC Santa Barbara	W 89–79	4–0	McKeon Pavilion; Moraga, CA
11/23/2013*; 2:00 pm		Cal Poly	W 77–69	5–0	McKeon Pavilion; Moraga, CA
11/29/2013*; 2:00 pm		Alabama; Hilton Concord Thanksgiving Classic	W 86–76	6–0	McKeon Pavilion; Moraga, CA
11/30/2013*; 2:00 pm		Toledo; Hilton Concord Thanksgiving Classic	W 81–57	7–0	McKeon Pavilion; Moraga, CA
12/05/2013*; 7:00 pm, Watch Big Sky		at Sacramento State	L 92–94	7–1	Colberg Court; Sacramento, CA
12/15/2013*; 2:00 pm		UC Davis	W 88–71	8–1	McKeon Pavilion; Moraga, CA
12/19/2013*; 6:00 pm, P12 Digital		at USC	W 71–55	9–1	Galen Center; Los Angeles, CA
12/21/2013*; 4:00 pm, BigWest.TV		at Cal State Northridge	W 72–60	10–1	Matadome; Northridge, CA
12/28/2013; 1:00 pm		Gonzaga	W 79–78 ^{OT}	11–1 (1–0)	McKeon Pavilion; Moraga, CA
12/30/2013; 6:00 pm		Portland	W 80–65	12–1 (2–0)	McKeon Pavilion; Moraga, CA
01/02/2014; 6:00 pm		at San Diego	L 70–80	12–2 (2–1)	Jenny Craig Pavilion; San Diego, CA
01/04/2014; 1:00 pm, BYUtv		at BYU	L 67–69 ^{OT}	12–3 (2–2)	Marriott Center; Provo, UT
01/09/2014; 7:00 pm		at Santa Clara	W 80–70	13–3 (3–2)	Leavey Center; Santa Clara, CA
01/11/2014; 2:00 pm		at San Francisco	W 86–67	14–3 (4–2)	War Memorial Gymnasium; San Francisco, CA
01/16/2014; 6:00 pm		Pepperdine	W 71–48	15–3 (5–2)	McKeon Pavilion; Moraga, CA
01/18/2014; 1:00 pm		Loyola Marymount	W 78–74	16–3 (6–2)	McKeon Pavilion; Moraga, CA
01/25/2014; 4:30 pm, TheW.tv		at Pacific	L 80–91	16–4 (6–3)	Alex G. Spanos Center; Stockton, CA
01/30/2014; 6:00 pm, TheW.tv		BYU	W 75–70	17–4 (7–3)	McKeon Pavilion; Moraga, CA
02/01/2014; 1:00 pm		San Diego	W 71–68	18–4 (8–3)	McKeon Pavilion; Moraga, CA
02/08/2014; 1:00 pm, TheW.tv		Pacific	L 71–88	18–5 (8–4)	McKeon Pavilion; Moraga, CA
02/13/2014; 7:00 pm		at Loyola Marymount	L 74–76	18–6 (8–5)	Gersten Pavilion; Los Angeles, CA
02/15/2014; 2:00 pm, TV-32		at Pepperdine	W 74–61	19–6 (9–5)	Firestone Fieldhouse; Malibu, CA
02/20/2014; 6:00 pm		San Francisco	W 83–64	20–6 (10–5)	McKeon Pavilion; Moraga, CA
02/22/2014; 1:00 pm		Santa Clara	L 83–89	20–7 (10–6)	McKeon Pavilion; Moraga, CA
02/27/2014; 6:00 pm, SWX		at Gonzaga	L 65–75	20–8 (10–7)	McCarthey Athletic Center; Spokane, WA
03/01/2014; 1:00 pm		at Portland	W 76–72	21–8 (11–7)	Chiles Center; Portland, OR
2014 West Coast Conference women's basketball tournament
03/07/2014; 8:00 pm, BYUtv		vs. San Diego	W 60–58	22–8	Orleans Arena; Las Vegas, NV
03/07/2014; 12:00 pm, BYUtv		vs. No. 19 Gonzaga	L 60–68	22–9	Orleans Arena; Las Vegas, NV
2014 Women's National Invitation Tournament
03/21/2014; 6:00 pm		Cal State Bakersfield; 1st Round	W 75–68	23–9	McKeon Pavilion; Moraga, CA
03/24/2014; 6:00 pm		at UTEP; 2nd Round	L 64–76	23–10	Don Haskins Center; El Paso, TX
*Non-conference game. ^{#}Rankings from AP Poll. (#) Tournament seedings in parentheses. All times are in Pacific Time.

== Game summaries ==
=== Washington ===
Nov 8
6:00 pm PST

Recap

Washington Huskies 81, Saint Mary's Gaels 91
Scoring by half: 47-38, 34-53
Pts: Kelsey Plum & Davis 23; Rebs: Katie Collier & Williams 6 Asts: Mercedes Wetmore 6	Pts: Jackie Nared 37; Rebs: Danielle Mauldin 17; Asts: Kate Gaze 10

McKeon Pavilion
Moraga, CA
Attendance: 723
Referees: Brenda Pantoja, Brian Woods, Cheryl Flores

=== Portland State ===
Nov 10
2:05 pm PST

Recap

Saint Mary's Gaels 72, Portland State Vikings 54
Scoring by half: 41-21, 31-33
Pts: Jackie Nared 18; Rebs: Danielle Mauldin & Hayley Hendricksen 6 Asts: Jackie Nared 6	Pts: Kate Lanz 21; Rebs: Kate Lanz 8 Asts: Emily Easom 5

Stott Center
Portland, OR
Attendance: 404
Referees: Robert Scofield, Bart Baldwin, Bruce Allen

=== Butler ===
Nov 15
12:00 pm EST

Recap

Saint Mary's Gaels 90, Butler Bulldogs 86 (OT)
Scoring by half: 35-36, 41-40 Overtime: 14-10
Pts: Danielle Mauldin & Lauren Nicholson 23; Rebs: Danielle Mauldin 9 Asts: Jackie Nared 4	Pts: Taylor Schippers 18; Rebs: Haley Howard, Daress McClung & Lexus Murry 5 Asts: Taylor Schippers & Lexus Murry 4

Hinkle Fieldhouse
Indianapolis, IN
Attendance: 582
Referees: Ed Sidlasky, JB DeRosa, Linda Miles

=== UC Santa Barbara ===
Nov 21
6:00 pm PST

Recap

UC Santa Barbara Gauchos 79, Saint Mary's Gaels 89
Scoring by half: 39-45, 40-44
Pts: Melissa Zorning 19; Rebs: Destini Mason 7 Asts: Melissa Zorning 9	Pts: Lauren Nicholson 26; Rebs: Danielle Mauldin 14; Asts: Kate Gaze & Danielle Mauldin 4

McKeon Pavilion
Moraga, CA
Attendance: 277
Referees: Kyle Bacon, Karen Lasuik, Felicity Willis

=== Cal Poly ===
Nov 23
1:00 pm PST

Recap

Cal Poly Mustangs 69, Saint Mary's Gaels 77
Scoring by half: 36-24, 33-53
Pts: Ariana Elegado 14; Rebs: Beth Balbierz & Molly Schlemer 8 Asts: Ariana Elegado 7	Pts: Danielle Mauldin 22; Rebs: Danielle Mauldin 22; Asts: Kate Gaze 5

McKeon Pavilion
Moraga, CA
Attendance: 245
Referees: Cathi Cornell, Brian Woods, Steve Belnap

=== Alabama ===
Nov 29
2:25 pm PST

Recap

Alabama Crimson Tide 76, Saint Mary's Gaels 86
Scoring by half: 44-49, 32-37
Pts: Shafontaye Myers 20; Rebs: Nikki Hegstetter 9 Asts: Daisha Simmons 7	Pts: Lauren Nicholson 28; Rebs: Danielle Mauldin 12; Asts: Kate Gaze 12

McKeon Pavilion
Moraga, CA
Attendance: 575
Referees: Melissa Barlow, Gordon Torigoe, Cheryll Blue

=== Toledo ===
Nov 30
2:25 pm PST

Recap

Toledo Rockets 57, Saint Mary's Gaels 81
Scoring by half: 29-39, 28-42
Pts: Inma Zanoguera 12; Rebs: Janice Monakana & Inma Zanoguera 6 Asts: Andola Dortch 5	Pts: Danielle Mauldin 21; Rebs: Danielle Mauldin 18; Asts: Jackie Nared 5

McKeon Pavilion
Moraga, CA
Attendance: 235
Referees: Melissa Barlow, Bart Baldwin, Paul Patterson

=== Sacramento State ===
Dec 5
7:00 pm PST

Recap

Saint Mary's Gaels 92, Sacramento State Hornets 94
Scoring by half: 46-42, 46-52
Pts: Jackie Nared 30; Rebs: Danielle Mauldin 14; Asts: Kate Gaze 11	Pts: Fantasia Hilliard & Hallie Gennett 21; Rebs: Margaret Huntington & Hallie Gennett 7 Asts: Fantasia Hilliard 10

Colberg Court
Sacramento, CA
Attendance: 575
Referees: Kyle Bacon, Robert Scofield, Benny Luna

=== UC Davis ===
Dec 15
1:00 pm PST

Recap

UC Davis Aggies 71, Saint Mary's Gaels 88
Scoring by half: 30-44, 41-44
Pts: Sydnee Fipps 23; Rebs: Idit Oryon 7 Asts: Molly Greubel & Brianna Salvatore 4	Pts: Danielle Mauldin 23; Rebs: Danielle Mauldin 14; Asts: Kate Gaze 7

McKeon Pavilion
Moraga, CA
Attendance: 323
Referees: Rick Showers, Ifeyinwa Seales, Rigoberto Vasquez

=== USC ===
Dec 19
6:00 pm PST

Recap

Saint Mary's Gaels 71, USC Trojans 55
Scoring by half: 29-27, 42-28
Pts: Kate Gaze 22; Rebs: Danielle Mauldin 10; Asts: Kate Gaze 6	Pts: Cassie Harberts 17; Rebs: Cassie Harberts 12; Asts: Jordan Adams 5

Galen Center
Los Angeles, CA
Attendance: 294
Referees: Melissa Barlow, Karen Lasuik, Richard Waters

=== Cal State Northridge ===
Dec 21
4:00 pm PST

Recap

Saint Mary's Gaels 72, Cal State Northridge Matadors 60
Scoring by half: 33-31, 39-29
Pts: Danielle Mauldin 17; Rebs: Danielle Mauldin 15; Asts: Kate Gaze 6	Pts: Janae Sharpe 19; Rebs: Randi Friess 8 Asts: Janae Sharpe 6

Matadome
Northridge, CA
Attendance: 213
Referees: Kenny Parzych, Brian Woods, Tracey Sparks

=== Gonzaga ===
Series History: Gonzaga leads 33-24

Dec 28
1:00 pm PST

Recap

Gonzaga Bulldogs 78, Saint Mary's Gaels 79 (OT)
Scoring by half: 37-32, 35-40 Overtime: 6-7
Pts: Haiden Palmer 31; Rebs: Lindsay Sherbert 9 Asts: Jazmine Redmon 9	Pts: Jackie Nared 27; Rebs: Danielle Mauldin 23; Asts: Kate Gaze 4

McKeon Pavilion
Moraga, CA
Attendance: 616
Referees: Robert Scofield, Darren Krzesnik, Kenneth Nash

=== Portland ===
Series History: Saint Mary's leads 36-20

Dec 30
6:00 pm PST

Recap

Portland Pilots 65, Saint Mary's Gaels 80
Scoring by half: 34-33, 31-47
Pts: Cassandra Brown 25; Rebs: Cassandra Brown 5 Asts: Alexis Byrs & Jasmine Wooton 4	Pts: Kate Gaze 20; Rebs: Danielle Mauldin 11; Asts: Shannon Mauldin 4

McKeon Pavilion
Moraga, CA
Attendance: 346
Referees: Michelle Russi, Bart Baldwin, Gordon Torigoe

=== San Diego ===
Series History: Saint Mary's leads 37-26

USD TV

Jan 2
6:05 pm PST

Recap

Saint Mary's Gaels 70, San Diego Toreros 80
Scoring by half: 33-40, 37-40
Pts: Jackie Nared 16; Rebs: Danielle Mauldin 12; Asts: Kate Gaze 2	Pts: Amy Kame 23; Rebs: Amy Kame 8 Asts: Amy Kame 7

Jenny Craig Pavilion
San Diego, CA
Attendance: 478
Referees: Kyle Bacon, Wanda Szermeta, Cheryl Flores

=== BYU ===
Series History: Saint Mary's leads 3-2
Broadcasters: Spencer Linton, Kristen Kozlowski, and Andy Boyce

BYUtv

Jan 4
2:05 pm MST

Recap

Saint Mary's Gaels 67, BYU Cougars 69 (OT)
Scoring by half: 32-28, 30-34 Overtime: 5-7
Pts: Jackie Nared 26; Rebs: Carli Rosenthal & Danielle Mauldin 11; Asts: Kate Gaze 4	Pts: Lexi Eaton 19; Rebs: Jannifer Hamson & Lexi Eaton 10; Asts: Kylie Maeda & Lexi Eaton 4

Marriott Center
Provo, UT
Attendance: 649
Referees: Darren Krzesnik, Shelley Nakasone, In'Fini Robinson

=== Santa Clara ===
Series History: Santa Clara leads 33-31

Jan 9
7:00 pm PST

Recap

Saint Mary's Gaels 80, Santa Clara Broncos 70
Scoring by half: 37-37, 43-33
Pts: Danielle Mauldin 24; Rebs: Danielle Mauldin 17; Asts: Kate Gaze 3	Pts: Jo Paine 19; Rebs: Marie Bertholdt 5 Asts: Nici Gilday & Raquel Avila 4

Leavey Center
Santa Clara, CA
Attendance: N/A
Referees: Karen Lasuik, Rick Showers, Brian Woods

=== San Francisco ===
Series History: Saint Mary's leads 34-23

Jan 11
2:00 pm MST

Recap

Saint Mary's Gaels 86, San Francisco Dons 67
Scoring by half: 42-30, 44-37
Pts: Jackie Nared 24; Rebs: Danielle Mauldin 10; Asts: Jackie Nared & Kate Gaze 3	Pts: Taylor Proctor 24; Rebs: Zhane Dikes & Taylor Proctor 8 Asts: Zhane Dikes 5

War Memorial Gymnasium
San Francisco, CA
Attendance: 472
Referees: Cathi Cornell, Robert Scofield, Skelly Wingard

=== Pepperdine ===
Series History: Saint Mary's leads 31-29

Jan 16
6:05 pm PST

Recap

Pepperdine Waves 48, Saint Mary's Gaels 71
Scoring by half: 16-42, 32-29
Pts: Alisha Roberts 15; Rebs: Ea Shoushtari & Amanda Lovely 7 Asts: Amanda Lovely 2	Pts: Jackie Nared 27; Rebs: Danielle Mauldin 13; Asts: Kate Gaze 5

McKeon Pavilion
Moraga, CA
Attendance: 245
Referees: Anita Ortega, Kenneth Nash, Julie Vanni

=== Loyola Marymount ===
Series History: Saint Mary's leads 39-16

Jan 18
1:00 pm PST

Recap

Loyola Marymount Lions 74, Saint Mary's Gaels 78
Scoring by half: 33-37, 41-41
Pts: Deanna Johnson 17; Rebs: Sophie Taylor 7 Asts: Hazel Ramirez 6	Pts: Jackie Nared 28; Rebs: Danielle Mauldin 17; Asts: Kate Gaze 4

McKeon Pavilion
Moraga, CA
Attendance: 442
Referees: Melissa Luna, Benny Luna, In'Fini Robinson

=== Pacific ===
Series History: Saint Mary's leads 13-6
Broadcasters: Don Gubbins and Alex Sanchez

TheW.tv

Jan 25
4:30 pm PST

Recap

Saint Mary's Gaels 80, Pacific Tigers 91
Scoring by half: 43-41, 37-50
Pts: Jackie Nared 33; Rebs: Danielle Mauldin 10; Asts: Kate Gaze 7	Pts: Kendall Kenyon 28; Rebs: Kendall Kenyon & Kiki Moore 8 Asts: Kiki Moore 8

Alex G. Spanos Center
Stockton, CA
Attendance: N/A
Referees: Brenda Pantoja, Cathi Cornell, Bart Baldwin

=== BYU ===
Series History: Series even 3-3
Broadcasters: George Devine and Mary Hile-Nepfel

TheW.tv

Jan 30
6:00 pm PST

Recap

BYU Cougars 70, Saint Mary's Gaels 75
Scoring by half: 30-36, 40-39
Pts: Lexi Eaton 28; Rebs: Jennifer Hamson 10; Asts: Lexi Eaton & Kylie Maeda 3	Pts: Kate Gaze 15; Rebs: Danielle Mauldin 13; Asts: Jackie Nared 5

McKeon Pavilion
Moraga, CA
Attendance: 264
Referees: Robert Scofield, Richard Waters, Paul Patterson

=== San Diego ===
Series History: Saint Mary's leads 37-27

Feb 1
1:00 pm PST

Recap

San Diego Toreros 68, Saint Mary's Gaels 71
Scoring by half: 37-34, 31-37
Pts: Amy Kame 28; Rebs: Katherine Hamilton 12; Asts: Malina Hood 3	Pts: Jackie Nared 25; Rebs: Danielle Mauldin 13; Asts: Kate Gaze 8

McKeon Pavilion
Moraga, CA
Attendance: 283
Referees: Shelly Russi, Crystal Hogan, Lisa Ulmer

=== Pacific ===
Series History: Saint Mary's leads 13-7
Broadcasters: George Devine and Mary Hile-Nepfel

TheW.tv

Feb 8
4:30 pm PST

Recap

Pacific Tigers 88, Saint Mary's Gaels 71
Scoring by half: 46-34, 42-37
Pts: Erin Butler 19; Rebs: Kendall Kenyon 10; Asts: Sam Pettinger 4	Pts: Danielle Mauldin 24; Rebs: Jackie Nared & Danielle Mauldin 9 Asts: Kate Gaze 8

McKeon Pavilion
Moraga, CA
Attendance: 263
Referees: Kyle Bacon, Cheryll Blue, Rigoberto Vasquez

=== Loyola Marymount ===
Series History: Saint Mary's leads 40-16

Feb 13
7:00 pm PST

Recap

Saint Mary's Gaels 74, Loyola Marymount Lions 76 (OT)
Scoring by half: 42-29, 28-41 Overtime: 4-6
Pts: Jackie Nared 25; Rebs: Danielle Mauldin 19; Asts: Kate Gaze 7	Pts: Hazel Ramirez 17; Rebs: Mackenzie Kerins 12; Asts: Hazel Ramirez 11

Gersten Pavilion
Los Angeles, CA
Attendance: 312
Referees: Lisa Jones, Darren Krzesnik, Skelly Wingard

=== Pepperdine ===
Series History: Saint Mary's leads 32-29
Broadcaster: Josh Perigo

TV-32

Feb 15
2:00 pm PST

Recap

Saint Mary's Gaels 74, Pepperdine Waves 61
Scoring by half: 33-31, 41-30
Pts: Danielle Mauldin 22; Rebs: Danielle Mauldin 8 Asts: Kate Gaze 6	Pts: Amanda Lovely 14; Rebs: Amanda Lovely 8 Asts: Allie Green 5

Firestone Fieldhouse
Malibu, CA
Attendance: 331
Referees: Brian Woods, Shelley Nakasone, Alex Carroll

=== San Francisco ===
Series History: Saint Mary's leads 35-23

Feb 20
6:00 pm MST

Recap

San Francisco Dons 64, Saint Mary's Gaels 83
Scoring by half: 43-45, 21-38
Pts: Zhane Dikes 17; Rebs: Zhane Dikes 7 Asts: Rachel Howard 4	Pts: Jackie Nared 23; Rebs: Danielle Mauldin 12; Asts: Jackie Nared 5

McKeon Pavilion
Moraga, CA
Attendance: 240
Referees: Michol Murray, Kyle Bacon, Julie Vanni

=== Santa Clara ===
Series History: Santa Clara leads 33-32

Feb 22
1:00 pm PST

Recap

Santa Clara Broncos 89, Saint Mary's Gaels 83
Scoring by half: 40-39, 49-44
Pts: Montana Walters 26; Rebs: Artei Lilomaiava 6 Asts: Montana Walters 7	Pts: Danielle Mauldin 24; Rebs: Danielle Mauldin 16; Asts: Jackie Nared & Kate Gaze 2

McKeon Pavilion
Moraga, CA
Attendance: 420
Referees: Shelly Russi, Bethany Graves, Lucy Banuelos

=== Gonzaga ===
Series History: Gonzaga leads 33-25
Broadcasters: Greg Heister and Stephanie Hawk Freeman

SWX

Feb 27
6:00 pm PST

Recap

Saint Mary's Gaels 65, Gonzaga Bulldogs 75
Scoring by half: 29-35, 36-40
Pts: Danielle Mauldin 20; Rebs: Danielle Mauldin 12; Asts: Kate Gaze 3	Pts: Haiden Palmer 19; Rebs: Shelby Cheslek 7 Asts: Jazmine Redmon 6

McCarthey Athletic Center
Spokane, WA
Attendance: 5,496
Referees: Melissa Barlow, Benny Luna, Tiffany Bird

== Rankings ==
+ Regular season polls	Poll	Pre- Season	Week 2	Week 3	Week 4	Week 5	Week 6	Week 7	Week 8	Week 9	Week 10	Week 11	Week 12	Week 13	Week 14	Week 15	Week 16	Week 17	Week 18	Week 19	Final
AP			RV											RV							
Coaches	RV	RV	RV	RV	RV																

Legend
	Increase in ranking
	Decrease in ranking
	No change
(RV)	Received votes

== See also ==
- Saint Mary's Gaels women's basketball
- 2013–14 Saint Mary's Gaels men's basketball team
