= 2013–14 Albany Great Danes women's basketball team =

Intercollegiate basketball season

2013–14 Albany Great Danes women's basketball

America East tournament Champions

NCAA tournament Louisville Regional 15 seed, First round
- Conference: America East Conference
- Record: 28–5 (15–1 America East)
- Head coach: Katie Abrahamson-Henderson (4th season)
- Assistant coaches: Tahnee Balerio; Mary Grimes; Kelly Komara
- Home arena: SEFCU Arena

2013–14 America East Conference women's basketball standings
	Conf.				Overall
Team	W		L	PCT	W		L	PCT
Albany†	15	–	1	.938	28	–	5	.848
Stony Brook	13	–	3	.813	24	–	9	.727
New Hampshire	12	–	4	.750	19	–	12	.613
Maine	10	–	6	.625	17	–	15	.531
Hartford	9	–	7	.563	13	–	18	.419
Vermont	4	–	12	.250	7	–	23	.233
UMass Lowell*	4	–	12	.250	5	–	23	.179
UMBC	3	–	13	.188	4	–	25	.138
Binghamton	2	–	14	.125	5	–	25	.167
† 2014 America East tournament winner As of 10:03, 1 April 2014 (UTC); Rankings from AP poll *ineligible for postseason play due to Div. I transitions

The 2013–14 Albany Great Danes women's basketball team represented the University at Albany, SUNY during the 2013–14 NCAA Division I women's basketball season. The Great Danes, led by fourth-year head coach Katie Abrahamson-Henderson, played their home games at SEFCU Arena and were members of the America East Conference. The Great Danes entered the season as back-to-back defending champions in the America East. The Danes continued their success of the previous season by winning the 2014 America East tournament for their third consecutive championship.

== Roster ==
2013–14 Albany Great Danes women's basketball team
Players
Coaches

Pos.	#	Name	Height	Year	Previous school	Hometown
G	1	Erin Coughlin	5 ft 6 in (1.68 m)	So	Tabor Academy	North Attleboro, MA
G	3	Margarita Rosario	5 ft 6 in (1.68 m)	Jr	Felix Varela	Miami, FL
G/F	4	Sarah Royals	5 ft 9 in (1.75 m)	Jr	Torrington	Torrington, CT
G	12	Imani Tate	5 ft 8 in (1.73 m)	Fr	Bishop Loughlin	Bronx, NY
F	13	Bose Aiyalogbe	6 ft 0 in (1.83 m)	Fr	Life Center Academy	Lagos, Nigeria
G	14	Tammy Phillip	5 ft 11 in (1.8 m)	Sr	Elmore Stoutt	Tortola, British Virgin Islands
G/F	15	Jessica Feguiere	5 ft 11 in (1.8 m)	Fr	Champlain College Saint-Lambert	Montreal, Quebec
G	23	Zakiya Saunders	5 ft 9 in (1.75 m)	Fr	Carthage Central	Fort Drum, NY
G/F	24	Keyontae Williams	5 ft 9 in (1.75 m)	So	James Monroe	Fredericksburg, VA
F	25	Shereesha Richards	6 ft 1 in (1.85 m)	So	Atlantic Christian	Rae Town, Jamaica
C	32	Megan Craig	6 ft 9 in (2.06 m)	Jr	Kamo	Whangārei, New Zealand
G	34	Cassandra Edwards	5 ft 10 in (1.78 m)	Fr	Notre Dame CSS	Brampton, Ontario

Head coach

- Katie Abrahamson-Henderson (Iowa)

Assistant coach(es)

- Tahnee Balerio (Missouri State)
- Mary Grimes (Siena)
- Kelly Komara (Purdue)

Legend

- (C) Team captain
- (S) Suspended
- (I) Ineligible
- (W) Walk-on
- Injured
- Current redshirt

Roster
Last update: October 27, 2013

== Schedule ==
Date time, TV	Rank^{#}	Opponent^{#}	Result	Record	Site (attendance) city, state
Regular season
11/08/2013*; 5:00 pm		at Siena; Albany Cup	W 69–42	1–0	Times Union Center (612); Albany, NY
11/10/2013*; 2:00 pm		Western Michigan	W 77–61	2–0	SEFCU Arena (587); Albany, NY
11/14/2013*; 7:00 pm		Marist	W 69–59	3–0	SEFCU Arena (882); Albany, NY
11/20/2013*; 7:00 pm		Cal State Fullerton	W 71–49	4–0	SEFCU Arena (567); Albany, NY
11/24/2013*; 2:00 pm		Delaware State	W 87–71	5–0	SEFCU Arena (553); Albany, NY
11/27/2013*; 7:00 pm		at Providence	W 70–60	6–0	Dunkin' Donuts Center (312); Providence, RI
12/04/2013*; 7:00 pm		at Dartmouth	W 81–59	7–0	Leede Arena (382); Hanover, NH
12/10/2013*; 7:00 pm		at NJIT	W 75–64	8–0	Estelle and Zoom Fleisher Athletic Center (500); Newark, NJ
12/15/2013*; 2:00 pm		Quinnipiac	L 53–74	8–1	SEFCU Arena (856); Albany, NY
12/19/2013*; 6:30 pm		at No. 2 Duke	L 51–80	8–2	Cameron Indoor Stadium (3,604); Durham, NC
12/22/2013*; 2:00 pm		Colgate	W 64–50	9–2	SEFCU Arena (976); Albany, NY
01/01/2014*; 2:00 pm		at Hofstra	L 56–60	9–3	Hofstra Arena (271); Hempstead, NY
01/04/2014*; 2:00 pm		at Northeastern	W 75–66	10–3	Matthews Arena (337); Boston, MA
01/09/2014; 7:00 pm, Northeast Sports Network		at Vermont	W 94–49	11–3 (1–0)	Patrick Gym (384); Burlington, VT
01/12/2014; 12:00 pm, ESPN3		at Hartford	W 69–52	12–3 (2–0)	Chase Arena at Reich Family Pavilion (2,992); Hartford, CT
01/16/2014; 7:00 pm		at UMass Lowell	W 87–50	13–3 (3–0)	Costello Athletic Center (188); Lowell, MA
01/18/2014; 2:00 pm		Maine	W 84–56	14–3 (4–0)	SEFCU Arena (793); Albany, NY
01/20/2014; 7:00 pm		at Binghamton	W 66–36	15–3 (5–0)	Binghamton University Events Center (1,138); Vestal, NY
01/23/2014; 12:00 pm		New Hampshire	W 88–47	16–3 (6–0)	SEFCU Arena (2,074); Albany, NY
01/28/2014; 7:00 pm		UMBC	W 65–39	17–3 (7–0)	SEFCU Arena (763); Albany, NY
01/30/2014; 7:00 pm		at Stony Brook	W 66–51	18–3 (8–0)	Pritchard Gymnasium (408); Stony Brook, NY
02/01/2014; 5:00 pm, ESPN3		Vermont; Big Purple Growl	W 69–52	19–3 (9–0)	SEFCU Arena (4,538); Albany, NY
02/04/2014; 7:00 pm		UMass Lowell	W 93–47	20–3 (10–0)	SEFCU Arena (484); Albany, NY
02/07/2014; 7:00 pm, ESPN3		Hartford	W 90–68	21–3 (11–0)	SEFCU Arena (1,114); Albany, NY
02/11/2014; 7:00 pm		at UMBC	W 56–46	22–3 (12–0)	Retriever Activities Center (315); Baltimore, MD
02/16/2014; 2:00 pm		at Maine	W 58–56	23–3 (13–0)	Memorial Gym (1,425); Orono, ME
02/19/2014; 7:00 pm		Binghamton	W 86–35	24–3 (14–0)	SEFCU Arena (922); Albany, NY
02/26/2014; 7:00 pm, CollegeInsider.com		at New Hampshire	W 60–47	25–3 (15–0)	Lundholm Gym (517); Durham, NH
03/01/2014; 2:00 pm, ESPN3		Stony Brook	L 56–66	25–4 (15–1)	SEFCU Arena (1,089); Albany, NY
2014 America East tournament
03/07/2014; 6:00 pm, ESPN3		Binghamton; Quarterfinals	W 77–59	26–4	SEFCU Arena (N/A); Albany, NY
03/09/2014; 11:00 am, ESPN3		Hartford; Semifinals	W 65–51	27–4	SEFCU Arena (N/A); Albany, NY
03/10/2014; 4:00 pm, ESPNU		Stony Brook; Championship	W 70–46	28–4	SEFCU Arena (688); Albany, NY
2014 NCAA Tournament
03/23/2014*; 3:00 pm, ESPN2	(15 L)	vs. (2 L) West Virginia; First Round	L 61–76	28–5	Pete Maravich Assembly Center (2,833); Baton Rouge, LA
*Non-conference game. ^{#}Rankings from AP Poll. (#) Tournament seedings in parentheses. L=NCAA Louisville Regional. All times are in Eastern Time.
