= 2013–14 Green Bay Phoenix women's basketball team =

Intercollegiate basketball season

2013–14 Green Bay Phoenix women's basketball

Horizon League Regular Season Champions

WNIT, First Round
- Conference: Horizon League
- Record: 18-8 (11-3 Horizon)
- Head coach: Kevin Borseth
- Assistant coaches: Amanda Leonhard-Perry; Sarah Bronk; Megan Vogel
- Home arena: Kress Events Center

2013–14 Horizon League women's basketball standings
	Conf.				Overall
Team	W		L	PCT	W		L	PCT
Green Bay	13	–	3	.813	22	–	10	.688
Wright State†	12	–	4	.750	26	–	9	.743
Youngstown State	10	–	6	.625	15	–	16	.484
Illinois-Chicago	10	–	6	.625	26	–	9	.743
Cleveland State	9	–	7	.563	14	–	16	.467
Oakland	8	–	8	.500	13	–	17	.433
Milwaukee	4	–	12	.250	8	–	22	.267
Detroit	3	–	13	.188	6	–	24	.200
Valparaiso	3	–	13	.188	6	–	25	.194
† 2014 Horizon League Tournament winner As of 10:03, 1 April 2014 (UTC); Rankings from AP poll

The 2013–14 Green Bay Phoenix women's basketball team represented the University of Wisconsin-Green Bay in the 2013–14 NCAA Division I women's basketball season. Their head coach was Kevin Borseth. The Phoenix played their home games at the Kress Events Center and were members of the Horizon League. It was the 35th season of Green Bay women's basketball. Last year they finished the season 29-3, 16-0 in Horizon League play to finish first overall. As an eleven seed, the Phoenix lost their first round match in the 2013 NCAA tournament to the LSU Lady Tigers.

The Phoenix clinched a share of their 16th straight and 19th overall conference championship with a 67-52 win over Horizon League newcomer Oakland on March 6. They also earned the number one seed in the 2014 Horizon League women's basketball tournament with the win. With their 72-52 win over Detroit on March 8, the Phoenix took sole possession of the conference regular season title.

== Roster ==
2013–14 Green Bay Phoenix women's basketball team
Players
Coaches

Pos.	#	Name	Height	Year	Previous school	Hometown
G	00	Brionna Barnett	5 ft 6 in (1.68 m)	So	Elkhart Memorial	Elkhart, Ind.
G	2	Tesha Buck	5 ft 11 in (1.8 m)	Fr	Red Wing	Red Wing, Minn.
G	21	Ellen Edison	5 ft 9 in (1.75 m)	RS So	Maple Grove	Maple Grove, Minn.
F	10	Mehryn Kraker	6 ft 0 in (1.83 m)	RS Fr	West Allis Central	West Allis, Wis.
G	4	Kaili Lukan	5 ft 10 in (1.78 m)	So	Barrie Central	Barrie, Ontario, Canada
G	14	Megan Lukan	5 ft 7 in (1.7 m)	RS Jr	Barrie Central	Barrie, Ontario, Canada
F	44	Mariah Monke	6 ft 2 in (1.88 m)	RS Fr	Fergus Falls	Fergus Falls, Minn.
F	3	Breannah Ranger	6 ft 2 in (1.88 m)	RS Sr	Niles North	Skokie, Ill.
G/F	55	Sam Terry	6 ft 0 in (1.83 m)	Fr	Baraboo	Baraboo, Wis.
G/F	12	Taylor Thomas	6 ft 0 in (1.83 m)	RS So	Wausau Newman	Wausau, Wis.
C	33	Lexi Weitzer	6 ft 3 in (1.91 m)	Fr	Waukesha South	Waukesha, Wis.
G	20	Sam Zastrow	5 ft 5 in (1.65 m)	RS Sr	Algoma	Algoma, Wis.

Head coach

Kevin Borseth

Assistant coach(es)

Amanda Leonhard-Perry
Sarah Bronk
Megan Vogel

Legend

- (C) Team captain
- (S) Suspended
- (I) Ineligible
- (W) Walk-on
- Injured
- Current redshirt

Roster
Last update: 2014-03-02

== Schedule ==
Date time, TV	Opponent	Result	Record	Site (attendance) city, state
Regular Season
11/08/2013*; 7:00 pm	Northern Illinois	W 78-44	1–0	Kress Events Center (2,171); Green Bay, WI
11/15/2013*; 6:00 pm	St. Bonaventure	L 62-68	1–1	Reilly Center (512); Saint Bonaventure, New York
11/17/2013*; 1:00 pm	Duquesne	W 68-60	2–1	A.J. Palumbo Center (898); Pittsburgh, Pa.
11/22/2013*; 6:00 pm	vs. Siena; TD Bank Classic First Round	W 74-57	3–1	Roy L Patrick Gymnasium (596); Burlington, VT
11/23/2013*; 6:00 pm	Vermont; TD Bank Classic Championship	W 74-57	4-1	Roy L Patrick Gymnasium (596); Burlington, VT
11/29/2013*; 6:00 pm	vs. William and Mary; Maine Thanksgiving Tournament First Round	W 90-44	5-1	Cross Insurance Center (1,468); Orono, MA
11/30/2013*; 1:00 pm	Maine; Maine Thanksgiving Tournament Championship	W 66-49	6-1	Cross Insurance Center (1,438); Orono, MA
12/07/2013*; 12:00 pm	South Dakota State	L 54-66	6-2	Kress Events Center (1,785); Green Bay, WI
12/15/2013*; 7:00 pm	Wichita State	L 58-63	6–3	Kress Events Center (1,752); Green Bay, WI
12/18/2013*; 7:00 pm	No. 18 Purdue	W 76–49	6–4	Kress Events Center (2,128); Green Bay, WI
12/30/2013*; 6:00 pm	Wisconsin	L 61-65 ^{OT}	6-5	Kohl Center (4,931); Madison, WI
1/01/2014*; 1:00 pm	Maine	W 72-49	7-5	Kress Events Center (1,654); Green Bay, WI
Horizon League regular season
1/08/2014; 7:00 pm	UIC	W 66–50	8-5 (1–0)	Kress Events Center (1,619); Green Bay, WI
1/11/2014; 1:00 pm	Milwaukee	L 64-75	8-6 (1-1)	Kress Events Center (2,538); Green Bay, WI
1/16/2014; 6:00 pm	at Youngstown State	L 57-66	8-7(1-2)	Beeghly Center (1,138); Youngstown, OH
1/18/2014; 1:00 pm	at Cleveland State	W 90-72	9-7 (2-2)	Wolstein Center (173); Cleveland, OH
1/25/2014; 1:00 pm	Wright State	W 69-67	10-7 (3-2)	Kress Events Center (2,240); Green Bay, WI
1/30/2014; 6:00 pm	at Oakland	W 74-58	11-7 (4-2)	Athletics Center O'rena (323); Rochester, MI
2/01/2014; 1:00 pm	Detroit	W 84-72	12-7 (5-2)	Calihan Hall (203); Detroit, MI
2/03/2014; 7:00 pm	Valparaiso	W 70-42	13-7 (6-2)	Kress Events Center (1,761); Green Bay, WI
2/08/2014; 3:00 pm	at UIC	W 81-54	14-7 (7-2)	UIC Pavilion (578); Chicago, IL
2/15/2014; 2:00 pm	Milwaukee	W 81-69	15-7 (8-2)	Klotsche Center (1,342); Milwaukee, WI
2/21/2014; 7:00 pm	Cleveland State	W 59-56	16-7 (9-2)	Kress Events Center (2,066); Green Bay, WI
2/23/2014; 1:00 pm	Youngstown State	L 63-72	16-8 (9-3)	Kress Events Center (3,089); Green Bay, WI
2/27/2014; 6:05 pm	at Wright State	W 79-72 ^{OT}	17-8 (10-3)	Nutter Center (857); Dayton, OH
3/01/2014; 7:00 pm	at Valparaiso	W 53-49	18-8 (11–3)	Athletics-Recreation Center (526); Valparaiso, IN
3/06/2014; 7:00 pm	Oakland	W 67-52	19-8 (12-3)	Kress Events Center (1,662); Green Bay, WI
3/08/2014; 1:00 pm	Detroit	W 72-52	20-8 (13-3)	Kress Events Center (2,776); Green Bay, WI
2014 Horizon League Tournament
3/12/2014; 7:00 pm	Valparaiso; Quarterfinals	W 72-55	21-8	Kress Events Center (1,428); Green Bay, WI
3/14/2014; 7:30 pm	UIC; Semifinals	W 68-59	22-8	Kress Events Center (1,515); Green Bay, WI
3/16/2014; 12:00 pm, ESPNU	Wright State; Championship	L 69-88	22-9	Kress Events Center (1,762); Green Bay, WI
2014 WNIT
3/19/2014; 7:00 pm	Minnesota; First Round	L 60-62	22-10	Williams Arena; Minneapolis, MN
*Non-conference game. ^{#}Rankings from AP Poll. (#) Tournament seedings in parentheses. All times are in Central Time.

== Awards and honors ==
=== Horizon League Awards ===
- Freshman of the Year: Tesha Buck
- Coach of the Year: Kevin Borseth
- All-League Second Team: Kaili Lukan
- All-Freshman Team: Tesha Buck, Mehryn Kraker
- All-Defensive Team: Megan Lukan
