= 2014 Missouri Valley Conference women's basketball tournament =

- Classification: Division I
- Season: 2013–14
- Teams: 10
- Site: Family Arena; St. Charles, Missouri
- Champions: Wichita State
- Television: MVC TV,

2013–14 Missouri Valley Conference women's basketball standings
	Conf.				Overall
Team	W		L	PCT	W		L	PCT
Indiana State	14	–	4	.778	20	–	12	.625
Wichita State†	14	–	4	.778	26	–	7	.788
Northern Iowa	13	–	5	.722	17	–	13	.567
Evansville	10	–	8	.556	15	–	16	.484
Drake	9	–	9	.500	17	–	15	.531
Missouri State	8	–	10	.444	14	–	17	.452
Illinois State	8	–	10	.444	10	–	20	.333
Loyola (IL)	6	–	12	.333	11	–	21	.344
Bradley	5	–	13	.278	8	–	22	.267
Southern Illinois	3	–	15	.167	5	–	25	.167
† 2014 MVC tournament winner As of April 1, 2014; Rankings from AP poll

The 2014 Missouri Valley Conference women's basketball tournament, popularly referred to as "Arch Madness," as part of the 2013-14 NCAA Division I women's basketball season was played in St. Charles, Missouri March 13–16, 2014, at the Family Arena. The championship game was televised on MVC TV and simulcast on FCS Central on Sunday March 16 at 2:05 PM (central). The tournament's winner received the Missouri Valley Conference's automatic bid to the 2014 NCAA tournament.

== Tournament bracket ==
First round Thursday, March 13; Valley Live
8	Loyola	75
9	Bradley	69
7	Missouri State	61
10	Southern Illinois	39

Quarterfinals; Friday, March 14; Valley Live
1	Indiana State	61
8	Loyola	52
4	Evansville	61
5	Drake	71
2	Wichita State	71
7	Missouri State	53
3	Northern Iowa	63
6	Illinois State	65

Semifinals; Saturday, March 15; MVC TV/FCS Central
1	Indiana State	58
5	Drake	66
2	Wichita State	66
6	Illinois State	50

Championship; Sunday, March 16; MVC TV/FCS Central
5	Drake	49
2	Wichita State	73
