= 2014 Patriot League women's basketball tournament =

- Classification: Division I
- Season: 2013–14
- Teams: 10
- Site: Campus sites
- MVP: Kelsey Minato
- Television: CBS Sports Network

2013–14 Patriot League women's basketball standings
	Conf.				Overall
Team	W		L	PCT	W		L	PCT
Navy	15	–	3	.833	24	–	8	.750
Army†	14	–	4	.778	25	–	8	.758
American U	14	–	4	.778	22	–	10	.688
Bucknell	11	–	7	.611	16	–	14	.533
Holy Cross	10	–	8	.556	20	–	12	.625
Lafayette	8	–	10	.444	14	–	16	.467
Boston U	7	–	11	.389	13	–	20	.394
Lehigh	5	–	13	.278	13	–	18	.419
Colgate	4	–	14	.222	8	–	22	.267
Loyola (MD)	2	–	16	.111	5	–	25	.167
† 2014 Patriot League tournament winner As of 10:03, 1 April 2014 (UTC); Rankings from AP poll

The 2014 Patriot League women's basketball tournament was held March 4, 6, 10, and 15 at campus sites of the higher seed. The winner of the tournament received an automatic bid to the NCAA tournament.

== Seeds ==
Teams are seeded by conference record, with a ties broken by record between the tied teams followed by record against the regular-season champion, if necessary.

Seed	School	Conference	Overall	Tiebreaker
1	Navy	15–3	23–6	
2	Army	14–4	22–7	2-0 vs. American
3	American	14–4	21–8	0-2 vs. Army
4	Bucknell	11–7	16–12	
5	Holy Cross	10–8	18–11	
6	Lafayette	8–10	14–15	
7	Boston U	7–11	12–19	
8	Lehigh	5–13	12–17	
9	Colgate	4–14	8–21	
10	Loyola (MD)	2–16	5–24	

== Schedule ==
Game	Time*	Matchup^{#}	Television	Attendance
First round – Tuesday, March 4
1	7:00	#9 Colgate at #8 Lehigh	SE2	359
2	7:00	#10 Loyola (MD) at #7 Boston U		163
Quarterfinals – Thursday, March 6
3	7:00	#8 Lehigh at #1 Navy		
4	7:00	#5 Holy Cross at #4 Bucknell		
5	7:00	#6 Lafayette at #3 American		
6	7:30	#7 Boston U at #2 Army		
Semifinals – Tuesday, March 10
7	TBA	Game 3 winner at Game 4 winner		
8	TBA	Game 5 winner at Game 6 winner		
Championship – Saturday, March 15
9	6:00	Game 7 winner at Game 8 winner	CBSSN	
*Game times in EST. #-Rankings denote tournament seeding.

== Bracket ==
First round March 4
8	Lehigh	59
9	Colgate	49
7	Boston U	40
10	Loyola (MD)	35

Quarterfinals; March 6
1	Navy	84
8	Lehigh	54
4	Bucknell	66
5	Holy Cross	79
2	Army	49
7	Boston U	45
3	American U	51
6	Lafayette	49

Semifinals; March 10
1	Navy	56
5	Holy Cross	75
2	Army	68
3	American U	55

Championship; March 15; CBS Sports Network
5	Holy Cross	58
2	Army	68
