= 2014 MAC women's basketball tournament =

- Classification: Division I
- Season: 2013–14
- Teams: 12
- Site: Quicken Loans Arena; Cleveland, Ohio
- Champions: Akron
- Winning coach: Jodi Kest
- MVP: Rachel Tecca (Akron)
- Television: TWCS/ESPN3
- MAC women's basketball tournaments

2013–14 Mid-American Conference women's basketball standings
| | Conf. | | | | Overall |
| Team | W | | L | PCT | W | | L | PCT |
|---|---|---|---|---|---|---|---|---|
| No. 25 Bowling Green | 17 | – | 1 | .944 | 30 | – | 5 | .857 |
| Akron† | 14 | – | 4 | .778 | 23 | – | 10 | .697 |
| Buffalo | 10 | – | 8 | .556 | 17 | – | 13 | .567 |
| Ohio | 4 | – | 14 | .222 | 9 | – | 21 | .300 |
| Kent State | 4 | – | 14 | .222 | 7 | – | 23 | .233 |
| Miami (OH) | 4 | – | 14 | .222 | 8 | – | 22 | .267 |
West
| Central Michigan | 16 | – | 2 | .889 | 20 | – | 12 | .625 |
| Ball State | 9 | – | 9 | .500 | 18 | – | 17 | .514 |
| Toledo | 9 | – | 9 | .500 | 16 | – | 16 | .500 |
| Western Michigan | 8 | – | 10 | .444 | 13 | – | 18 | .419 |
| Eastern Michigan | 7 | – | 11 | .389 | 18 | – | 14 | .563 |
| Northern Illinois | 6 | – | 12 | .333 | 11 | – | 19 | .367 |
† 2014 MAC tournament winner As of March 22, 2014; Rankings from AP poll

The 2014 Mid-American Conference women's basketball tournament is the post-season basketball tournament for the Mid-American Conference (MAC) 2013–14 college basketball season. The 2014 tournament was held March 10–15, 2014. Third seeded Akron won the championship over fifth seeded Ball State. Rachel Tecca of Akron was the MVP.

== Format ==
First round games were held on campus sites at the higher seed on March 10. The remaining rounds were held at Quicken Loans Arena, between March 12–15. As with the recent tournaments, the top two seeds received byes into the semifinals, with the three and four seeds receiving a bye to the quarterfinals.

== Schedule ==
| Game | Time* | Matchup^{#} | Television |
First Round – Monday, March 10
| 1 | 7:00 PM | #12 Kent State at #5 Ball State | MACDN |
| 2 | 5:00 PM | #9 Northern Illinois at #8 Eastern Michigan | MACDN |
| 3 | 7:00 PM | #10 Miami at #7 Western Michigan | MACDN |
| 4 | 7:00 PM | #11 Ohio at #6 Toledo | BCSN |
Second Round – Wednesday, March 12
| 5 | 12:00 PM | #5 Ball State vs. #9 Northern Illinois | MACDN |
| 6 | 2:30 PM | #6 Toledo vs. #7 Western Michigan | MACDN |
Quarterfinals – Thursday, March 13
| 7 | 12:00 PM | #4 seed vs. Game 5 winner | MACDN |
| 8 | 2:30 PM | #3 seed vs. Game 6 winner | MACDN |
Semifinals – Friday, March 14
| 9 | 12:00 PM | #1 seed vs. Game 7 winner | TWCS |
| 10 | 2:30 PM | #2 seed vs Game 8 winner | TWCS |
Championship Game – Saturday, March 15
| 11 | 1:00 PM | Game 9 winner vs. Game 10 winner | TWCS |
* Game times in ET. # Rankings denote tournament seed

== Bracket ==
First round Monday, March 10
5 | Ball State | 73
12 | Kent State | 38
8 | Eastern Michigan | 76
9 | Northern Illinois | 81
6 | Toledo | 61
11 | Ohio | 44
7 | Western Michigan | 82
10 | Miami | 69

Second round Wednesday, March 12
1 | Bowling Green
(bye)
4 | Buffalo
(bye)
5 | Ball State | 61
9 | Northern Illinois | 47
2 | Central Michigan
(bye)
3 | Akron
(bye)
6 | Toledo | 72
7 | Western Michigan | 61

Quarterfinals; Thursday, March 13
1 | Bowling Green
(bye)
4 | Buffalo | 60
5 | Ball State | 74
2 | Central Michigan
(bye)
3 | Akron | 83
6 | Toledo | 69

Semifinals; Friday, March 14
1 | Bowling Green | 55
5 | Ball State | 73
2 | Central Michigan | 69
3 | Akron | 85

Championship; Saturday, March 15
5 | Ball State | 68
3 | Akron | 79

== All-Tournament Team ==
Tournament MVP – Rachel Tecca, Akron

| Player | Team |
|---|---|
| Brandy Woody | Ball State |
| Shelbie Justice | Ball State |
| Kacie Cassell | Akron |
| Hanna Luburgh | Akron |
| Rachel Tecca | Akron |
