= 2013–14 Hartford Hawks women's basketball team =

Intercollegiate basketball season

2013–14 Hartford Hawks women's basketball
- Conference: America East Conference
- Record: 13–18 (9–7 America East)
- Head coach: Jennifer Rizzotti (15th season)
- Assistant coaches: Brian Nik (15th season); Bill Sullivan (14th season); Jackie Smith (1st season)
- Home arena: Chase Arena at Reich Family Pavilion

2013–14 America East Conference women's basketball standings
	Conf.				Overall
Team	W		L	PCT	W		L	PCT
Albany†	15	–	1	.938	28	–	5	.848
Stony Brook	13	–	3	.813	24	–	9	.727
New Hampshire	12	–	4	.750	19	–	12	.613
Maine	10	–	6	.625	17	–	15	.531
Hartford	9	–	7	.563	13	–	18	.419
Vermont	4	–	12	.250	7	–	23	.233
UMass Lowell*	4	–	12	.250	5	–	23	.179
UMBC	3	–	13	.188	4	–	25	.138
Binghamton	2	–	14	.125	5	–	25	.167
† 2014 America East tournament winner As of 10:03, 1 April 2014 (UTC); Rankings from AP poll *ineligible for postseason play due to Div. I transitions

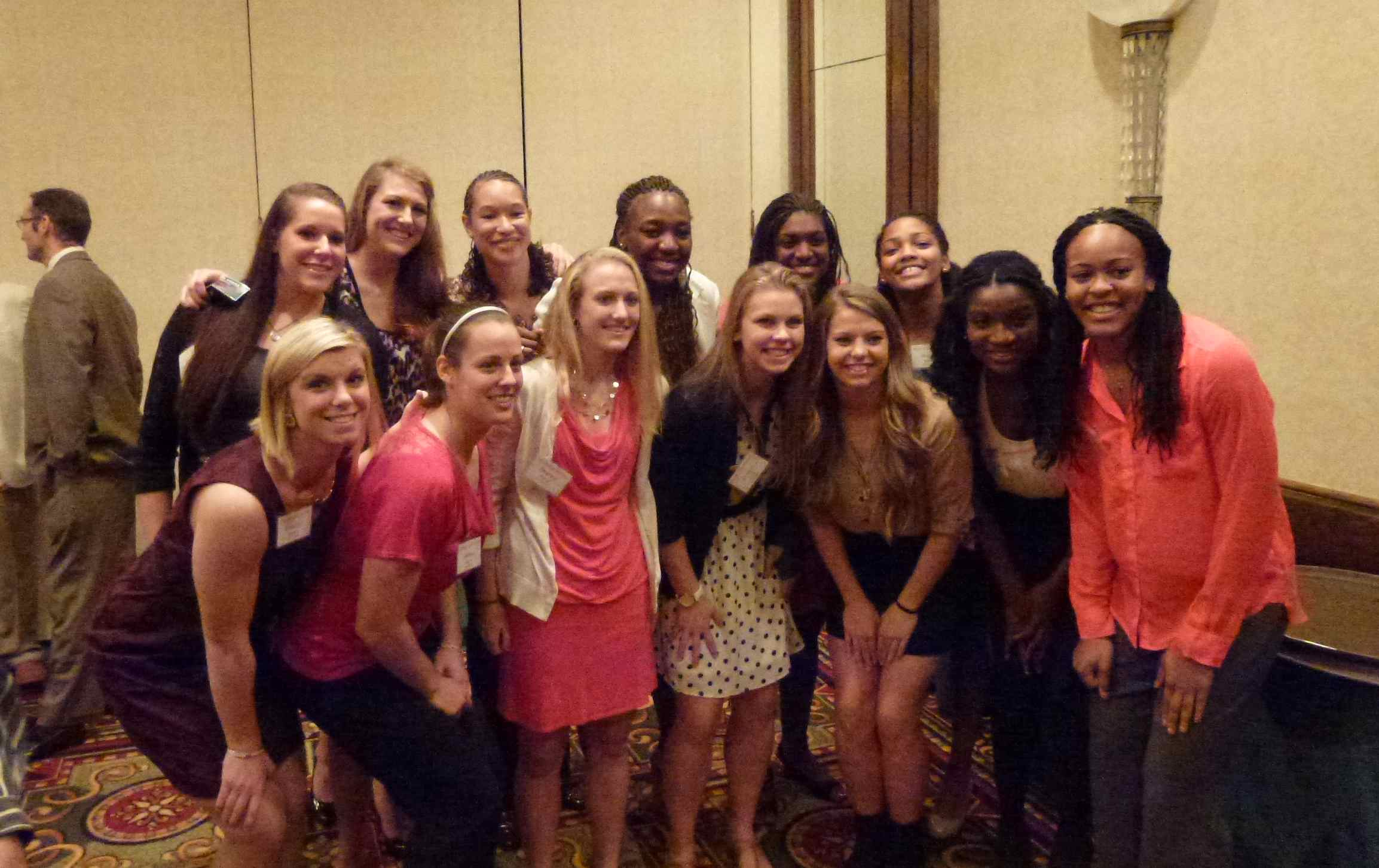
2013–14 Hartford Hawks Women's Basketball team

The 2013–14 Hartford Hawks women's basketball team represented the University of Hartford in the America East Conference. The Hawks were led by 15th year Women's Basketball Hall of Fame head coach Jennifer Rizzotti and will once again play their home games in the Chase Arena at Reich Family Pavilion.

== Roster ==
2013–14 Hartford Hawks women's basketball team
Players
Coaches

Pos.	#	Name	Height	Year	Previous school	Hometown
G	3	Deanna Mayza	5 ft 7 in (1.7 m)	Fr	The Hill School	Pennsburg, PA
F	4	Christie Michals	6 ft 1 in (1.85 m)	So	Robinson Secondary	Fairfax, VA
G	10	Diamond Doe	5 ft 8 in (1.73 m)	Sr	Lynn Classical	Lynn, MA
G	11	Katelyn Skinner	5 ft 10 in (1.78 m)	So	Homer Center	Homer City, PA
F	12	La'Trice Hall	5 ft 11 in (1.8 m)	Fr	Buffalo Academy of the Sacred Heart	Buffalo, NY
F	13	Taylor Clark	6 ft 0 in (1.83 m)	Sr	Athens Area	Sayre, PA
G	14	Morgan Lumb	5 ft 8 in (1.73 m)	Fr	North Andover	North Andover, MA
F	15	Milana Gilbert	6 ft 0 in (1.83 m)	Sr	Acad. of New Church	Smyrna, DE
G	21	Shanise Bultron	5 ft 8 in (1.73 m)	Jr	Tabor Academy	Watertown, MA
F	22	Katie Roth	6 ft 2 in (1.88 m)	So	Maple Hill	Castleton, NY
G	23	Alyssa Englert	5 ft 9 in (1.75 m)	Sr	Wayland-Cohocton	Dansville, NY
F	24	Alyssa Reaves	6 ft 0 in (1.83 m)	Fr	Northwest Catholic	Bloomfield, CT
G	25	Amber Bepko	5 ft 9 in (1.75 m)	Jr	Mercy	Guilford, CT
G	30	Mallory Shickora	5 ft 8 in (1.73 m)	So	Mount Saint Dominic Acad.	Little Falls, NJ
F	31	Cherelle Moore	6 ft 0 in (1.83 m)	Jr	Kolbe Cathedral	Bridgeport, CT

Head coach

Jennifer Rizzotti

Assistant coach(es)

Sarah Eichler
Bill Sullivan
Jackie Smith

Legend

- (C) Team captain
- (S) Suspended
- (I) Ineligible
- (W) Walk-on
- Injured
- Current redshirt

Roster
Last update: 2013-09-15

== Schedule ==
Date time, TV	Rank^{#}	Opponent^{#}	Result	Record	Site (attendance) city, state
Non-conference regular season
11/09/2013*; 4:00 p.m.		at No. 1 UConn	L 34–89	0–1	XL Center; Hartford, CT
11/14/2013*; 7:00 p.m.		at Loyola	W 59–53	1–1	Baltimore, MD
11/20/2013*; 7:00 p.m.		at Providence	L 53–79	1–2	Alumni Hall; Providence, RI
11/23/2013*; 2:00 p.m.		UMass	L 59–63	1–3	Chase Arena at Reich Family Pavilion; West Hartford, CT
11/26/2013*; 7:00 p.m.		Central Connecticut; Rivalry	L 50–82	1–4	Chase Arena at Reich Family Pavilion; West Hartford, CT
11/29/2013*; 3:15 p.m.		vs. Missouri; Miami Thanksgiving Tournament	L 45–68	1–5	BankUnited Center; Coral Gables, FL
11/30/2013*; 3:15 p.m.		vs. St. Francis Brooklyn; Miami Thanksgiving Tournament	L 49–56	1–6	BankUnited Center; Coral Gables, FL
12/04/2013*; 7:00 p.m.		at Quinnipiac	L 49–62	1–7	People's United Center; Hamden, CT
12/08/2013*; 1:00 p.m.		at Boston College	L 45–65	1–8	Conte Forum; Chestnut Hill, MA
12/11/2013; 7:00 p.m.		at Maine	W 66–56 ^{OT}	2–8 (1–0)	Bangor, ME
12/15/2013*; 2:00 p.m.		Vanderbilt	L 56–65	2–9 (1–0)	Chase Arena at Reich Family Pavilion; West Hartford, CT
12/21/2013*; 2:00 p.m.		at Sacred Heart	W 70–64	3–9 (1–0)	William H. Pitt Center; Fairfield, CT
12/29/2013*; 2:00 p.m.		at No. 15 Penn State	L 56–70	3–10 (1–0)	University Park, PA
01/04/2014*; 2:00 p.m.		Dartmouth	W 56–43	4–10 (1–0)	Chase Arena at Reich Family Pavilion; West Hartford, CT
America East regular season
01/08/2014; 7:00 p.m.		at Stony Brook	L 57–61	4–11 (1–1)	Pritchard Gymnasium; Stony Brook, NY
01/12/2014; 12:00 p.m.		Albany	L 52–69	4–12 (1–2)	Chase Arena at Reich Family Pavilion; West Hartford, CT
01/18/2014; 2:00 p.m.		New Hampshire	L 56–61	4–13 (1–3)	Chase Arena at Reich Family Pavilion; West Hartford, CT
01/20/2014; 7:00 p.m.		at UMass Lowell	W 80–76	5–13 (2–3)	Costello Athletic Center; Lowell, MA
01/23/2014; 7:00 p.m.		Binghamton	W 66–42	6–13 (3–3)	Chase Arena at Reich Family Pavilion; West Hartford, CT
01/25/2014; 1:00 p.m.		at UMBC	W 65–55	7–13 (4–3)	Catonsville, MD
01/29/2014; 7:00 p.m.		at Vermont	W 64–51	8–13 (5–3)	Patrick Gym; Burlington, VT
02/02/2014; 2:00 p.m.		Stony Brook	W 61–48	9–13 (6–3)	Chase Arena at Reich Family Pavilion; West Hartford, CT
02/07/2014; 7:00 p.m.		at Albany	L 68–90	9–14 (6–4)	Albany, NY
02/12/2014; 12:00 p.m.		Maine	L 56–60	9–15 (6–5)	Chase Arena at Reich Family Pavilion; West Hartford, CT
02/16/2014; 2:00 p.m.		at New Hampshire	L 71–76	9–16 (6–6)	Lundholm Gym; Durham, NH
02/19/2014; 7:00 p.m.		UMass Lowell	W 80–64	10–16 (7–6)	Chase Arena at Reich Family Pavilion; West Hartford, CT
02/22/2014; 2:00 p.m.		UMBC	W 80–64	11–16 (8–6)	Chase Arena at Reich Family Pavilion; West Hartford, CT
02/26/2014; 7:00 p.m.		at Binghamton	L 51–55	11–17 (8–7)	Vestal, NY
03/01/2014; 2:00 p.m.		Vermont	W 57–49	12–17 (9–7)	Chase Arena at Reich Family Pavilion; West Hartford, CT
America East Women's Tournament
03/07/2014; 8:15 pm	(5)	vs. (4) Maine; America East Championship	W 63–62 ^{OT}	13–17 (9–7)	Albany, NY
03/09/2014; 11:00 am	(5)	vs. (1) Albany; America East Championship	L 51–65	13–18 (9–7)	Albany, NY
*Non-conference game. ^{#}Rankings from AP Poll. (#) Tournament seedings in parentheses. All times are in EST.
