= 2014 Southern Conference women's basketball tournament =

- Classification: Division I
- Season: 2013–14
- Teams: 10
- Site: U.S. Cellular Center; Asheville, North Carolina
- Champions: Chattanooga (15 title)
- Television: ESPN3/CSS

2013–14 Southern Conference women's basketball standings
| | Conf. | | | | Overall |
| Team | W | | L | PCT | W | | L | PCT |
|---|---|---|---|---|---|---|---|---|
| Chattanooga† | 18 | – | 0 | 1.000 | 29 | – | 4 | .879 |
| Furman | 12 | – | 6 | .667 | 18 | – | 13 | .581 |
| Davidson | 11 | – | 7 | .611 | 16 | – | 16 | .500 |
| Appalachian State | 10 | – | 8 | .556 | 13 | – | 16 | .448 |
| Elon | 10 | – | 8 | .556 | 15 | – | 16 | .484 |
| Samford | 8 | – | 10 | .444 | 10 | – | 20 | .333 |
| Western Carolina | 7 | – | 11 | .389 | 15 | – | 17 | .469 |
| Georgia Southern | 7 | – | 11 | .389 | 10 | – | 21 | .323 |
| Wofford | 4 | – | 14 | .222 | 6 | – | 23 | .207 |
| UNC Greensboro | 3 | – | 15 | .167 | 7 | – | 23 | .233 |
† 2014 SoCon Tournament winner As of April 1, 2014; Rankings from AP poll

The 2014 Southern Conference women's basketball tournament took place between March 7 and 10 in Asheville, North Carolina, at the U.S. Cellular Center. The quarterfinals will be streamed on ESPN3 while the semifinals and finals will be shown on CSS and streamed on ESPN3. The champion receives an automatic bid into the 2014 NCAA tournament.

== Bracket ==
First round Friday, March 7
8 | Georgia Southern | 75
9 | Wofford | 62
7 | Western Carolina | 77
10 | UNC Greensboro | 60

Quarterfinals; Saturday, March 8 ESPN3
1 | Chattanooga | 66
8 | Georgia Southern | 57
4 | Appalachian State | 56
5 | Elon | 59
2 | Furman | 70
7 | Western Carolina | 75
3 | Davidson | 55
6 | Samford | 42

Semifinals; Sunday, March 9 CSS/ESPN3
1 | Chattanooga | 77
5 | Elon | 44
7 | Western Carolina | 67
3 | Davidson | 74

Championship; Monday, March 10; CSS/ESPN3
1 | Chattanooga | 71
3 | Davidson | 45
