= 2013–14 Cleveland State Vikings women's basketball team =

Intercollegiate basketball season

2013–14 Cleveland State Vikings women's basketball
- Conference: Horizon League
- Record: 14–16 (9–7 Horizon)
- Head coach: Kate Peterson Abiad
- Assistant coaches: Bernard Scott; Brittany Korth; Darryl Brown
- Home arena: Wolstein Center

2013–14 Horizon League women's basketball standings
	Conf.				Overall
Team	W		L	PCT	W		L	PCT
Green Bay	13	–	3	.813	22	–	10	.688
Wright State†	12	–	4	.750	26	–	9	.743
Youngstown State	10	–	6	.625	15	–	16	.484
Illinois-Chicago	10	–	6	.625	26	–	9	.743
Cleveland State	9	–	7	.563	14	–	16	.467
Oakland	8	–	8	.500	13	–	17	.433
Milwaukee	4	–	12	.250	8	–	22	.267
Detroit	3	–	13	.188	6	–	24	.200
Valparaiso	3	–	13	.188	6	–	25	.194
† 2014 Horizon League Tournament winner As of 10:03, 1 April 2014 (UTC); Rankings from AP poll

The 2013–14 Cleveland State Vikings women's basketball team represented Cleveland State University in the 2013–14 NCAA Division I women's basketball season. Their head coach was Kate Peterson Abiad. The Vikings played their home games at the Wolstein Center and were members of the Horizon League. It was the 41st season of Cleveland State women's basketball. Last year they finished the season 13–17, 5–11 in Horizon League play to finish tied for sixth overall.

== Roster ==
2013–14 Cleveland State Vikings women's basketball team
Players
Coaches

Pos.	#	Name	Height	Year	Previous school	Hometown
G	4	Adesuwa Aideyman	5 ft 7 in (1.7 m)	So	Reynoldsburg	Reynoldsburg, Ohio
F/C	35	Alliyah Anderson	6 ft 1 in (1.85 m)	Fr	Dillard	Lauderdale Lake, Fla.
G	3	Chrishna Butler	5 ft 8 in (1.73 m)	Fr	Gahanna Lincoln	Gahanna, Ohio
G	15	Cori Coleman	5 ft 8 in (1.73 m)	Jr	Murry Bergtraum	Springfield Gardens, N.Y.
G	24	Alexis Eckles	5 ft 10 in (1.78 m)	So	Rufus King	Milwaukee, Wis.
F	1	Imani Gordon	5 ft 10 in (1.78 m)	Jr	Firestone	Akron, Ohio
G	21	Kiersten Green	5 ft 5 in (1.65 m)	Jr	Manheim Township	Lancaster, Pa.
G	11	Khayla Livingston	5 ft 6 in (1.68 m)	Fr	Archbishop Edward McCarthy	Hollywood, Fla.
F	5	Allison Mitchell	5 ft 9 in (1.75 m)	So	South Point	South Point, Ohio
F	40	Haley Schmitt	6 ft 1 in (1.85 m)	Sr	Gahanna Lincoln	Gahanna, Ohio
G	12	Brooke Thompson-Smith	5 ft 8 in (1.73 m)	Fr	Twinsburg	Twinsburg, Ohio
F	25	Olivia Voskuhl	5 ft 10 in (1.78 m)	Fr	Notre Dame Academy	Elsmere, Ky.

Head coach

Kate Peterson Abiad

Assistant coach(es)

Bernard Scott
Britt Korth
Darryl Brown

Legend

- (C) Team captain
- (S) Suspended
- (I) Ineligible
- (W) Walk-on
- Injured
- Current redshirt

Roster
Last update: 2013-08-18
