= 2014 Ohio Valley Conference women's basketball tournament =

- Classification: Division I
- Season: 2013–14
- Teams: 8
- Site: Nashville Municipal Auditorium; Nashville, Tennessee
- Television: ESPN3

2013–14 Ohio Valley Conference women's basketball standings
| | Conf. | | | | Overall |
| Team | W | | L | PCT | W | | L | PCT |
|---|---|---|---|---|---|---|---|---|
West
| UT Martin† | 15 | – | 1 | .938 | 24 | – | 8 | .750 |
| SIU Edwardsville | 7 | – | 9 | .438 | 11 | – | 19 | .367 |
| Eastern Illinois | 7 | – | 9 | .438 | 12 | – | 16 | .429 |
| Southeast Missouri State | 6 | – | 10 | .375 | 10 | – | 19 | .345 |
| Austin Peay | 6 | – | 10 | .375 | 9 | – | 20 | .310 |
| Murray State | 4 | – | 12 | .250 | 11 | – | 17 | .393 |
East
| Belmont | 10 | – | 6 | .625 | 14 | – | 18 | .438 |
| Tennessee Tech | 9 | – | 7 | .563 | 12 | – | 18 | .400 |
| Tennessee State | 9 | – | 7 | .563 | 12 | – | 18 | .400 |
| Eastern Kentucky | 9 | – | 7 | .563 | 17 | – | 13 | .567 |
| Jacksonville State | 8 | – | 8 | .500 | 14 | – | 18 | .438 |
| Morehead State | 6 | – | 10 | .375 | 12 | – | 17 | .414 |
† 2014 OVC tournament winner As of March 22, 2014; Rankings from AP poll

The 2014 Ohio Valley Conference women's basketball tournament was held March 5–8 at Nashville Municipal Auditorium in Nashville, Tennessee. The conference tournament winner received the conference's automatic bid to the 2014 NCAA Tournament. The entire tournament was shown on ESPN3 and the OVC Digital Network.

== Format ==
The tournament was an eight-team tournament with the third and fourth seeds receiving a first round bye and the two divisional winners receiving byes through to the semifinals.

The top team in each division, based on conference winning percentage, automatically earns a berth into the OVC Tournament. The next six teams with the highest conference winning percentage also earn a bid, regardless of division. The 1st seed goes to the divisional winner with the higher conference winning percentage, while the No. 2 seed automatically goes to the other divisional winner. The remaining six teams are seeded 3–8 by conference winning percentage, regardless of division.

== Seeds ==
| Seed | School | Conf (Overall) | Tiebreaker |
|---|---|---|---|
| #1 | UT Martin | 15-1 (22-7) | |
| #2 | Belmont | 10-6 (13-16) | |
| #3 | Tennessee Tech | 9-7 (12-17) | 3-1 vs. Tennessee St. & E. Kentucky |
| #4 | Tennessee State | 9-7 (12-17) | 2-2 vs. Tennessee Tech & E. Kentucky |
| #5 | Eastern Kentucky | 9-7 (15-12) | 1-3 vs. Tennessee Tech & Tennessee St. |
| #6 | Jacksonville State | 8-8 (12-17) | |
| #7 | SIU Edwardsville | 7-9 (11-18) | 1-1 vs. UT Martin |
| #8 | Eastern Illinois | 7-9 (12-15) | 0-2 vs. UT Martin |

== Bracket ==
First round Wednesday, March 5
5 | Eastern Kentucky | 75
8 | Eastern Illinois | 52
6 | Jacksonville State | 71
7 | SIU Edwardsville | 59

Quarterfinals; Thursday, March 6
4 | Tennessee State | 75
5 | Eastern Kentucky | 79
3 | Tennessee Tech | 56
6 | Jacksonville State | 57

Semifinals; Friday, March 7
1 | UT Martin | 97
5 | Eastern Kentucky | 45
2 | Belmont | 65
6 | Jacksonville State | 50

Championship game Saturday, March 8
1 | UT Martin | 78
2 | Belmont | 66

== See also ==
2014 Ohio Valley Conference men's basketball tournament
