= 2014 MAAC women's basketball tournament =

- Classification: Division I
- Season: 2013–14
- Teams: 10
- Site: MassMutual Center; Springfield, MA
- Champions: Marist (10th title)
- Winning coach: Brian Giorgis (10th title)
- MVP: Sydney Coffey (Marist)
- Television: ESPNU/ESPN3

2013–14 MAAC women's basketball standings
	Conf.				Overall
Team	W		L	PCT	W		L	PCT
Iona	18	–	2	.900	26	–	6	.813
Marist†	18	–	2	.900	27	–	7	.794
Fairfield	15	–	5	.750	22	–	11	.667
Quinnipiac	13	–	6	.684	21	–	13	.618
Canisius	9	–	11	.450	13	–	17	.433
Rider	9	–	11	.450	15	–	17	.469
Manhattan	8	–	12	.400	9	–	21	.300
Niagara	8	–	12	.400	10	–	20	.333
Monmouth	6	–	14	.300	8	–	25	.242
Siena	3	–	17	.150	9	–	22	.290
St. Peter's	2	–	18	.100	3	–	27	.100
† 2014 MAAC tournament winner As of 10:03, 1 April 2014 (UTC); Rankings from AP poll

The 2014 Metro Atlantic Athletic Conference women's basketball tournament was held March 6–10 at the MassMutual Center in Springfield, Massachusetts. The tournament was held in Springfield through 2014. The winner of the tournament received the conference's automatic bid into the 2014 NCAA tournament.

== Bracket and results ==
First round Thursday, March 6
8	Niagara	62
9	Monmouth	66
7	Manhattan	66
10	Siena	87
6	Rider	64
11	St. Peter's	55

Quarterfinals; Friday, March 7
1	Iona	71
9	Monmouth	56
4	Quinnipiac	72
5	Canisius	61
2	Marist	87
10	Siena	65
3	Fairfield	56
6	Rider	63

Semifinals; Sunday, March 9 ESPN3
1	Iona	68
4	Quinnipiac	79
2	Marist	70
6	Rider	59

Championship game Monday, March 10; ESPNU
4	Quinnipiac	66
2	Marist	70

All times listed are Eastern

== See also ==
- Metro Atlantic Athletic Conference
- MAAC women's basketball tournament
