= 2014 Summit League women's basketball tournament =

- Classification: Division I
- Season: 2013–14
- Teams: 7
- Site: Sioux Falls Arena; Sioux Falls, South Dakota
- Television: FCS Central, Midco Sports Net, ESPNU

2013–14 Summit League women's basketball standings
	Conf.				Overall
Team	W		L	PCT	W		L	PCT
South Dakota State	13	–	1	.929	26	–	10	.722
IUPUI	11	–	3	.786	23	–	10	.697
IPFW	8	–	6	.571	15	–	15	.500
South Dakota†	7	–	7	.500	19	–	14	.576
Western Illinois	6	–	8	.429	14	–	16	.467
Denver	5	–	9	.357	9	–	23	.281
Omaha*	4	–	10	.286	12	–	16	.429
North Dakota State	2	–	12	.143	6	–	24	.200
† 2014 Summit League Tournament winner As of March 22, 2014; Rankings from AP Poll *ineligible for postseason due to Div. I transition

The 2014 Summit League women's basketball tournament was the 2014 post-season tournament for The Summit League, an NCAA Division I athletic conference. The tournament took place March 8–11, 2014, at the Sioux Falls Arena in Sioux Falls, South Dakota. This is the last season only 7 teams will participate. Next season Oral Roberts will return to the Summit League, giving the tournament 8 teams, and in 2016 Omaha will become eligible to participate in the tournament, making it a 9-team tournament. Next year an 8-team format will be used, with no team receiving a bye. For 2016, an 8/9 first round match will be added, with the winner moving to face the 1-seed in the quarterfinals. Seeds 1-7 will be given a bye to the quarterfinals.

== Tiebreaking procedure ==
The following rules define the tiebreaking procedure for the Summit League tournament. If there are multiple ties, the ties shall be broken in descending order. Once a tie is broken using the procedures below, it shall remain broken for purposes of all future comparisons. Tiebreaker procedures are used only to determine seeds for the league tournament.

=== Two-team tiebreaking criteria ===
The following criteria are applied to break ties between two teams:

1. Results of head-to-head competition between the two tied teams.
2. Comparison of each tied team's record against the team occupying the highest position in the standings continuing down through the standings until a team gains an advantage.
3. When arriving at another group of tied teams while comparing records, use each team's record against the collective tied teams as a group (prior to that group's own tie-breaking procedure) rather than the performance against individual tied teams.
4. If a tie still cannot be broken after applying criteria (1), (2) and (3), it will be broken by comparing each tied team's Ratings Percentage Index (RPI) (based upon the RPIratings.com Report issued on the morning following the last regular season league game).

=== Multiple-team tiebreaking criteria ===
The following criteria are applied to break ties between more than two teams:

1. Results of each tied team's collective record against the other teams tied for the same position.
2. If multiple ties still remain, then each tied team's record shall be compared to the team or group (if two or more are tied) occupying the highest position in the standings continuing down through the standings until a team gains an advantage.
3. If the above results in two teams remaining, the two-team tiebreaker is used.
4. If a tie involving three or more teams still cannot be broken after applying criteria (1) and (2), it will be broken by comparing each tied team's RPI (based upon the RPIratings.com Report issued on the morning following the last regular season league game).

== Bracket ==
Quarterfinals; March 8–9; FCS Central/Midco Sports Net
4	South Dakota	96
5	Western Illinois	94
2	IUPUI	72
7	North Dakota State	64
3	IPFW	73
6	Denver	79

Semifinals; March 10; FCS Central/Midco Sport Net
1	South Dakota State	58
4	South Dakota	72
2	IUPUI	69
6	Denver	76^{OT}

Championship game March 11; ESPNU
4	South Dakota	82
6	Denver	71
