= 2014 Horizon League women's basketball tournament =

- 2014 Tournament logo
- Classification: Division I
- Season: 2013–14
- Teams: 9
- Television: HLN and ESPNU

The 2014 Horizon League women's basketball tournament was a tournament from March 10 through March 16. The first round, quarterfinals and semifinals will be broadcast on the Horizon League Network, while the championship will be on ESPNU. The tournament champion will receive an automatic bid to the 2014 NCAA tournament.

2013–14 Horizon League women's basketball standings
	Conf.				Overall
Team	W		L	PCT	W		L	PCT
Green Bay	13	–	3	.813	22	–	10	.688
Wright State†	12	–	4	.750	26	–	9	.743
Youngstown State	10	–	6	.625	15	–	16	.484
Illinois-Chicago	10	–	6	.625	26	–	9	.743
Cleveland State	9	–	7	.563	14	–	16	.467
Oakland	8	–	8	.500	13	–	17	.433
Milwaukee	4	–	12	.250	8	–	22	.267
Detroit	3	–	13	.188	6	–	24	.200
Valparaiso	3	–	13	.188	6	–	25	.194
† 2014 Horizon League Tournament winner As of 10:03, 1 April 2014 (UTC); Rankings from AP poll

== Seeds ==
All 9 Horizon League schools participated in the tournament. Teams are seeded by 2013–14 Horizon League season record. The top 7 teams received a first-round bye.

Seeding for the tournament was determined at the close of the regular conference season:

Seed	Team	Record	Tiebreaker
1	Green Bay	13–3	
2	Wright State	12–4	
3	Youngstown State	10–6	1–1 vs UIC; 2–0 vs Green Bay
4	UIC	10–6	1–1 vs Youngstown State; 0–2 vs Green Bay
5	Cleveland State	9–7	
6	Oakland	8–8	
7	Milwaukee	4–12	
8	Detroit	3–13	1–1 vs Valparaiso; 0–2 vs Green Bay; 0–2 vs Wright State; 1–1 vs Youngstown State
9	Valparaiso	3–13	1–1 vs Detroit; 0–2 vs Green Bay; 0–2 vs Wright State; 0–2 vs Youngstown State

== Schedule ==
Game	Time*	Matchup^{#}	Television
First round – Monday, March 10
1	7:00 PM	#9 Valparaiso at #8 Detroit	Horizon League Network
Quarterfinals - Wednesday, March 12
2	7:00 PM	#9 Valparaiso at #1 Green Bay	Horizon League Network
3	7:00 PM	#5 Cleveland State at #4 UIC	Horizon League Network
4	7:05 PM	#6 Oakland at #3 Youngstown State	Horizon League Network
5	7:00 PM	#7 Milwaukee at #2 Wright State	Horizon League Network
Semifinals – Friday, March 14 (Hosted by Green Bay)
6	6:00 PM	#3 Youngstown State vs #2 Wright State	Horizon League Network
7	8:30 PM	#4 UIC at #1 Green Bay	Horizon League Network
Championship – Sunday, March 16
8	1:00 pm	#2 Wright State at #1 Green Bay	ESPNU
*First and second round times are local time. Semifinal and championship times are in Eastern Time Zone. *Rankings denote tournament seeding.

== Bracket ==
First round Monday, March 10; Hosted by Detroit
8	Detroit	69
9	Valparaiso	76

Quarterfinals; Wednesday, March 12; Hosted on campus sites
1	Green Bay	72
9	Valparaiso	55
4	UIC	77
5	Cleveland State	72
2	Wright State	73
7	Milwaukee	64
3	Youngstown State	68
6	Oakland	64

Semifinals; Friday, March 14; Hosted by Green Bay
1	Green Bay	68
4	UIC	59
2	Wright State	98
3	Youngstown State	70

Championship; Sunday, March 16; Hosted by Green Bay
1	Green Bay	69
2	Wright State	88
