= 2014 MEAC women's basketball tournament =

Athletic Conference

- Classification: Division I
- Season: 2013–14
- Teams: 13
- Site: Norfolk Scope; Norfolk, Virginia
- Television: ESPN3

2013–14 MEAC women's basketball standings
	Conf.				Overall
Team	W		L	PCT	W		L	PCT
Hampton†	16	–	0	1.000	28	–	5	.848
North Carolina A&T	13	–	3	.813	24	–	7	.774
Coppin State	12	–	4	.750	17	–	14	.548
Florida A&M	10	–	6	.625	17	–	14	.548
Savannah State	10	–	6	.625	19	–	14	.576
Norfolk State	8	–	8	.500	12	–	16	.429
Bethune-Cookman	8	–	8	.500	12	–	18	.400
Howard	6	–	10	.375	11	–	20	.355
North Carolina Central	6	–	10	.375	11	–	19	.367
South Carolina State	5	–	11	.313	7	–	20	.259
Maryland-Eastern Shore	4	–	12	.250	9	–	21	.300
Morgan State	3	–	13	.188	5	–	25	.167
Delaware State	3	–	13	.188	8	–	21	.276
† 2014 MEAC tournament winner As of 10:03, 1 April 2014 (UTC); Rankings from AP poll

The 2014 Mid-Eastern Athletic Conference women's basketball tournament took place March 10–15, 2014, at the Norfolk Scope in Norfolk, Virginia. 2014 was the second year in Norfolk after the last eight years in Winston-Salem, North Carolina. First round games were played March 10 and March 11, with the quarterfinal games played on March 12 and 13. The semifinals were held March 14, with the championship game on March 15.

== Bracket ==
First round March 10 and 11
8	Howard	74
9	NC Central	59
4	Florida A&M	86
13	Delaware State	58
5	Savannah State	82
12	Morgan State	71
7	Bethune-Cookman	64
10	South Carolina State	55
6	Norfolk State	66
11	Maryland Eastern Shore	70

Quarterfinals; March 12 and 13
1	Hampton	71
8	Howard	55
4	Florida A&M	75
5	Savannah State	84
2	North Carolina A&T	78
7	Bethune-Cookman	46
3	Coppin State	82
11	Maryland Eastern Shore	60

Semifinals; March 14
1	Hampton	65
5	Savannah State	49
2	North Carolina A&T	55
3	Coppin State	57

Championship; March 15; ESPN3
1	Hampton	50
3	Coppin State	47
