= 2014 America East women's basketball tournament =

- 2014 America East tournament logo
- Classification: Division I
- Season: 2013–14
- Teams: 8
- Finals site: SEFCU Arena; Albany, NY
- Champions: Albany
- Television: ESPNU/ESPN3
- America East women's basketball tournaments

2013–14 America East Conference women's basketball standings
	Conf.				Overall
Team	W		L	PCT	W		L	PCT
Albany†	15	–	1	.938	28	–	5	.848
Stony Brook	13	–	3	.813	24	–	9	.727
New Hampshire	12	–	4	.750	19	–	12	.613
Maine	10	–	6	.625	17	–	15	.531
Hartford	9	–	7	.563	13	–	18	.419
Vermont	4	–	12	.250	7	–	23	.233
UMass Lowell*	4	–	12	.250	5	–	23	.179
UMBC	3	–	13	.188	4	–	25	.138
Binghamton	2	–	14	.125	5	–	25	.167
† 2014 America East tournament winner As of 10:03, 1 April 2014 (UTC); Rankings from AP poll *ineligible for postseason play due to Div. I transitions

The 2014 America East women's basketball tournament began on March 7 and concluded with the championship game on March 10 at SEFCU Arena in Albany, NY. The winner earned an automatic bid to the 2014 NCAA tournament.

== Bracket and results ==
Quarterfinals; Friday, March 7, 2014; ESPN3
1	Albany	77
8	Binghamton	59
4	Maine	62
5	Hartford	63 *
2	Stony Brook	61
7	UMBC	49
3	New Hampshire	85
6	Vermont	79

Semifinals; Sunday, March 9, 2014; ESPN3
1	Albany	65
5	Hartford	51
2	Stony Brook	79
3	New Hampshire	59

Championship Game; Monday, March 10, 2014; ESPNU
1	Albany	70
2	Stony Brook	46

All times listed are Eastern

== See also ==
- America East Conference
- 2014 America East men's basketball tournament
