= 2013–14 UCLA Bruins women's basketball team =

American college basketball season

2013–14 UCLA Bruins women's basketball
- Conference: Pac-12 Conference
- Record: 13–18 (7–11 Pac-12)
- Head coach: Cori Close (3rd season)
- Assistant coaches: Jenny Huth; Tony Newnan; Shannon Perry
- Home arena: Pauley Pavilion

2013–14 Pac-12 Conference women's basketball standings
	Conf.				Overall
Team	W		L	PCT	W		L	PCT
No. 6 Stanford	17	–	1	.944	33	–	4	.892
No. 24 California	13	–	5	.722	22	–	10	.688
Oregon State	13	–	5	.722	24	–	11	.686
Arizona State	11	–	7	.611	23	–	10	.697
USC †	11	–	7	.611	22	–	13	.629
Washington	10	–	8	.556	20	–	14	.588
Washington State	9	–	9	.500	17	–	17	.500
UCLA	7	–	11	.389	13	–	18	.419
Colorado	6	–	12	.333	19	–	15	.559
Oregon	6	–	12	.333	16	–	16	.500
Utah	4	–	14	.222	12	–	19	.387
Arizona	1	–	17	.056	5	–	25	.167
† 2014 Pac-12 Tournament winner As of 6 April 2014; Rankings from AP poll

The 2013–14 UCLA Bruins women's basketball team represented the University of California, Los Angeles during the 2013–14 NCAA Division I women's basketball season. The Bruins, led by third-year head coach Cori Close, played their home games at the Pauley Pavilion and were members of the Pac-12 Conference. With many injuries, the team finished the season in 8th place with a conference record of 7–11 and 13–18 overall, and the graduation of seniors Thea Lemberger and Atonye Nyingifa.

== Roster ==
2013–14 UCLA Bruins women's basketball team
Players
Coaches

Pos.	#	Name	Height	Year	Previous school	Hometown
G	1	Thea Lemberger	5 ft 7 in (1.7 m)	Sr	Santa Monica HS	Santa Monica, Calif.
G	2	Kari Korver	5 ft 9 in (1.75 m)	So	Valley Christian	Paramount, Calif.
G	4	Lauren Holiday	5 ft 8 in (1.73 m)	RS Fr	Campbell Hall	Calabasas, Calif.
F	10	Kacy Swain	6 ft 3 in (1.91 m)	Jr	St. Bernard's HS	Los Angeles, Calif.
F	11	Atonye Nyingifa	5 ft 11 in (1.8 m)	Sr	Redondo Union HS	Torrance, Calif.
C	13	Luiana Livulo	6 ft 3 in (1.91 m)	RS Jr	Northwest Florida State/Escola Secondaria Rainha D. Amelia	Lisbon, Portugal
G	14	Dominique Williams	5 ft 8 in (1.73 m)	Fr	St. Mary's Catholic	Phoenix, Ariz.
G/F	20	Rhema Gardner	6 ft 1 in (1.85 m)	RS Jr	Ayala HS	Upland, Calif.
G	21	Nirra Fields	5 ft 9 in (1.75 m)	So	Mater Dei	Montreal, QC, Canada
G	22	Madeline Brooks (W)	5 ft 8 in (1.73 m)	Jr	Temecula HS	Temecula, Calif.
F	24	Paulina Hersler	6 ft 2 in (1.88 m)	Fr	Igelstavikens Gymnasium	Södertälje, Sweden
F/C	34	Corinne Costa	6 ft 4 in (1.93 m)	RS Jr	Liberty HS	Discovery Bay, Calif.
C	54	Savanna Trapp	6 ft 9 in (2.06 m)	Fr	Esko	Esko, Minn.

Head coach

Cori Close

Assistant coach(es)

Jenny Huth
Tony Newnan
Shannon Perry

Legend

- (C) Team captain
- (S) Suspended
- (I) Ineligible
- (W) Walk-on
- Injured
- Current redshirt

Roster
Last update: 2013-08-16

== Schedule ==
Date time, TV	Rank^{#}	Opponent^{#}	Result	Record	Site (attendance) city, state
Regular season
11/08/2013*; 10:00 am		at No. 17 Nebraska	L 49–77	0–1	Pinnacle Bank Arena (9,750); Lincoln, NE
11/11/2013*; 2:00 pm		Pepperdine	W 82–78	1–1	Pauley Pavilion (1,301); Los Angeles, CA
11/17/2013*; 3:00 pm, P12N		No. 12 North Carolina	L 68–78	1–2	Pauley Pavilion (2,465); Los Angeles, CA
11/24/2013*; 1:00 pm, P12N		No. 10 Oklahoma	W 82–76	2–2	Pauley Pavilion (1,503); Los Angeles, CA
11/29/2013*; 5:30 pm		vs. James Madison; Gulf Coast Showcase Quarterfinals	L 67–77	2–3	Germain Arena (279); Estero, FL
12/07/2013*; 9:00 am		vs. Grand Canyon; Gulf Coast Showcase consolation 2nd round	W 62–60	2–4	Germain Arena (250); Estero, FL
12/01/2013*; 9:00 am		vs. NC State; Gulf Coast Showcase 5th place game	L 49–67	3–4	Germain Arena (229); Estero, FL
12/07/2013*; 9:00 am		at No. 4 Notre Dame	L 48–90	3–5	Edmund P. Joyce Center (8,581); South Bend, IN
12/15/2013*; 2:00 pm		at San Diego State	W 56–55	4–5	Viejas Arena (706); San Diego, CA
12/20/2013*; 10:00 am		at Minnesota; Subway Classic	W 58–55	5–5	Williams Arena (5,065); Minneapolis, MN
12/21/2013*; 12:00 pm		vs. Auburn; Subway Classic	L 60–66	5–6	Williams Arena (350); Minneapolis, MN
12/28/2013*; 12:00 pm		Cal Poly	W 96–89	6–6	Pauley Pavilion (948); Los Angeles, CA
12/30/2013; 7:00 pm, P12N		USC	L 54–56	6–7 (0–1)	Pauley Pavilion (3,297); Los Angeles, CA
01/03/2014; 6:00 pm, P12N		Utah	W 55–38	7–7 (1–1)	Pauley Pavilion (785); Los Angeles, CA
01/05/2014; 6:00 pm, P12N		No. 12 Colorado	L 59–61	7–8 (1–2)	Pauley Pavilion (1,494); Los Angeles, CA
01/10/2014; 7:00 pm, P12N		at Arizona	W 67–61	8–8 (2–2)	McKale Center (3,106); Tucson, AZ
01/12/2014; 12:00 pm, P12N		at No. 23 Arizona State	L 57–59	8–9 (2–3)	Wells Fargo Arena (2,425); Tempe, AZ
01/17/2014; 8:00 pm, P12N		Oregon	W 88–63	9–9 (3–3)	Pauley Pavilion (2,575); Los Angeles, CA
01/20/2014; 12:00 pm, P12N		Oregon State	W 66–63	10–9 (4–3)	Pauley Pavilion (1,485); Los Angeles, CA
01/24/2014; 8:00 pm, P12N		at No. 4 Stanford	L 55–72	10–10 (4–4)	Maples Pavilion (4,434); Stanford, CA
01/26/2014; 6:00 pm, P12N		at No. 19 California	L 53–69	10–11 (4–5)	Haas Pavilion (2,060); Berkeley, CA
01/31/2014; 8:00 pm, P12N		Washington	L 58–70	10–12 (4–6)	Pauley Pavilion (1,422); Los Angeles, CA
02/02/2014; 12:00 pm		Washington State	W 79–72	11–12 (5–6)	Pauley Pavilion (820); Los Angeles, CA
02/08/2014; 3:00 pm, P12N		at USC	L 54–68	11–13 (5–7)	Galen Center (4,254); Los Angeles, CA
02/14/2014; 7:00 pm		at Oregon State	L 54–70	11–14 (5–8)	Gill Coliseum (1,101); Corvallis, OR
02/17/2014; 4:00 pm, P12N		at Oregon	W 103–83	12–14 (6–8)	Matthew Knight Arena (965); Eugene, OR
01/26/2014; 6:00 pm, P12N		No. 18 California	L 72–77	12–15 (6–9)	Pauley Pavilion (2,381); Los Angeles, CA
02/23/2014; 4:00 pm, P12N		No. 5 Stanford	L 56–65	12–16 (6–10)	Pauley Pavilion (7,074); Los Angeles, CA
02/28/2014; 5:00 pm, P12N		at Colorado	L 42–62	12–17 (6–11)	Coors Events Center (4,477); Boulder, CO
03/02/2014; 1:00 pm, P12N		at Utah	W 62–52	13–17 (7–11)	Jon M. Huntsman Center (934); Salt Lake City, UT
2014 Pac-12 Conference women's tournament
03/06/2014; 12:00 pm, P12N		vs. Colorado; First Round	L 65–76	13–18	KeyArena (N/A); Seattle, WA
*Non-conference game. ^{#}Rankings from AP Poll. (#) Tournament seedings in parentheses. All times are in Pacific Time.

== Honors ==
All-Pac-12

- Nirra Fields, G, So., Montreal, Canada
- Atonye Nyingifa, F Sr., Torrance, California

Honorable Mention

- Corinne Costa (F/C, RSJr.)

Pac-12 All-Academic Team

- Honorable Mention: Thea Lemberger and Atonye Nyingifa

== See also ==
- 2013–14 UCLA Bruins men's basketball team
