= 2013–14 California Golden Bears women's basketball team =

Intercollegiate basketball season

2013–14 California Golden Bears women's basketball

Nugget Classic Champions

NCAA Women's Tournament, second round
- Conference: Pac-12 Conference

Ranking
- Coaches: No. 22
- AP: No. 24
- Record: 22–10 (13–5 Pac-12)
- Head coach: Lindsay Gottlieb (3rd season)
- Assistant coaches: Charmin Smith; Kai Felton; Katy Steding
- Home arena: Haas Pavilion

2013–14 Pac-12 Conference women's basketball standings
	Conf.				Overall
Team	W		L	PCT	W		L	PCT
No. 6 Stanford	17	–	1	.944	33	–	4	.892
No. 24 California	13	–	5	.722	22	–	10	.688
Oregon State	13	–	5	.722	24	–	11	.686
Arizona State	11	–	7	.611	23	–	10	.697
USC †	11	–	7	.611	22	–	13	.629
Washington	10	–	8	.556	20	–	14	.588
Washington State	9	–	9	.500	17	–	17	.500
UCLA	7	–	11	.389	13	–	18	.419
Colorado	6	–	12	.333	19	–	15	.559
Oregon	6	–	12	.333	16	–	16	.500
Utah	4	–	14	.222	12	–	19	.387
Arizona	1	–	17	.056	5	–	25	.167
† 2014 Pac-12 Tournament winner As of 6 April 2014; Rankings from AP poll

The 2013–14 California Golden Bears women's basketball team represented University of California, Berkeley during the 2013–14 NCAA Division I women's basketball season. The Golden Bears, led by third year head coach Lindsay Gottlieb, played their home games at the Haas Pavilion and were members of the Pac-12 Conference. They finished with a record of 22–10 overall, 13–5 in Pac-12 play for a tie for a second-place finish. They lost in the quarterfinals in the 2014 Pac-12 Conference women's basketball tournament to Washington State. They were invited to the 2014 NCAA Division I women's basketball tournament, where they defeated Fordham in the first round before getting defeated by Baylor in the second round.

== Roster ==
2013–14 California Golden Bears women's basketball team
Players
Coaches

Pos.	#	Name	Height	Year	Previous school	Hometown
G	12	Hind Ben Abdelkader	5 ft 7 in (1.7 m)	Fr	Dexia Namur	Bruxelles, Belgium
G	15	Brittany Boyd	5 ft 9 in (1.75 m)	Jr	Berkeley	Berkeley, CA
F	25	Gennifer Brandon	6 ft 2 in (1.88 m)	RS Sr	Chatsworth	Sylmar, CA.
G	5	Avigiel Cohen	6 ft 0 in (1.83 m)	Sr	Rothberg	Ramat HaSharon, Israel
F	11	Kyra Dunn	6 ft 3 in (1.91 m)	RS Jr	Sacramento	Sacramento, CA
F	21	Reshanda Gray	6 ft 3 in (1.91 m)	Jr	Washington Prep	Los Angeles, CA
F	40	Justine Hartman	6 ft 2 in (1.88 m)	Jr	Brea Olinda	Whittier, CA
G	10	Mercedes Jefflo	5 ft 10 in (1.78 m)	Fr	Centennial Senior	Compton, CA
G	2	Afure Jemerigbe	6 ft 0 in (1.83 m)	Sr	St. Mary's	Stockton, CA
G	30	Mikayla Lyles	5 ft 8 in (1.73 m)	Sr	Bishop O'Dowd	Pleasanton, CA
F	24	Courtney Range	6 ft 3 in (1.91 m)	Fr	Manteca	Manteca, CA
G	23	Brittany Shine	5 ft 10 in (1.78 m)	RS Jr	Sacramento	Sacramento, CA
F	44	KC Waters	6 ft 2 in (1.88 m)	Fr	Bishop O'Dowd	Oakland, CA

Head coach

Lindsay Gottlieb

Assistant coach(es)

Charmin Smith
Kai Felton
Katy Steding

Legend

- (C) Team captain
- (S) Suspended
- (I) Ineligible
- (W) Walk-on
- Injured
- Current redshirt

Roster
Last update: 2013-08-17

== Schedule ==
Date time, TV	Rank^{#}	Opponent^{#}	Result	Record	Site (attendance) city, state
Exhibition
11/01/2013*; 8:30 pm	No. 9	Vanguard	W 91–62	–	Haas Pavilion (1,204); Berkeley, CA
Regular Season
11/08/2013*; 6:00 pm	No. 9	Long Beach State	W 70–51	1–0	Haas Pavilion (1,084); Berkeley, CA
11/10/2013*; 3:00 pm, ESPNU	No. 9	No. 2 Duke	L 58–70	1–1	Haas Pavilion (10,771); Berkeley, CA
11/15/2013*; 4:00 pm	No. 10	at George Washington	L 72–75	1–2	Smith Center (1,014); Washington, D.C.
11/17/2013*; 12:00 pm	No. 10	at Georgetown	W 67–52	2–2	McDonough Gymnasium (481); Washington, D.C.
11/24/2013*; 3:00 pm, P12N	No. 17	Northwestern	W 65–51	3–2	Haas Pavilion (2,049); Berkeley, CA
11/29/2013*; 7:30 pm	No. 21	vs. Wake Forest; Nugget Classic semifinals	W 84–61	4–2	Lawlor Events Center (1,252); Reno, NV
11/30/2013*; 8:00 pm	No. 21	vs. Idaho; Nugget Classic championship	W 59–55	5–2	Lawlor Events Center (950); Reno, NV
12/07/2013*; 2:00 pm	No. 20	Pacific	W 68–66 ^{OT}	6–2	Haas Pavilion (1,761); Berkeley, CA
12/15/2013*; 2:00 pm	No. 22	Cal State Bakersfield	W 70–51	7–2	Haas Pavilion (1,836); Berkeley, CA
12/22/2013*; 10:30 am, ESPN	No. 21	vs. No. 1 Connecticut; Maggie Dixon Classic	L 47–80	7–3	Madison Square Garden (5,468); New York City, NY
12/29/2013*; 2:00 pm	No. 23	Lafayette	W 77–60	8–3	Haas Pavilion (1,769); Berkeley, CA
01/03/2014; 8:00 pm, P12N	No. 23	Oregon State	W 72–63	9–3 (1–0)	Haas Pavilion (1,643); Berkeley, CA
01/05/2014; 12:00 pm, P12N	No. 23	Oregon	W 101–98 ^{OT}	10–3 (2–0)	Haas Pavilion (2,071); Berkeley, CA
01/10/2014; 7:00 pm, P12N	No. 19	at No. 17 Colorado	W 57–55	11–3 (3–0)	Coors Events Center (2,432); Boulder, CO
01/12/2014; 12:00 pm, P12N	No. 19	at Utah	W 68–59	12–3 (4–0)	Jon M. Huntsman Center (811); Salt Lake City, UT
01/17/2014; 12:00 pm	No. 15	at No. 19 Arizona State	L 59–68	12–4 (4–1)	Wells Fargo Arena (4,077); Tempe, AZ
01/20/2014; 2:00 pm, P12N	No. 15	at Arizona	W 79–64	13–4 (5–1)	McKale Center (1,154); Tucson, AZ
01/24/2014; 6:00 pm, P12N	No. 19	USC	L 70–77	13–5 (5–2)	Haas Pavilion (1,699); Berkeley, CA
01/26/2014; 6:00 pm, P12N	No. 19	UCLA	W 69–53	14–5 (6–2)	Haas Pavilion (2,060); Berkeley, CA
01/30/2014; 8:00 pm, P12N	No. 21	at No. 4 Stanford	L 64–70	14–6 (6–3)	Maples Pavilion (4,228); Stanford, CA
02/02/2014; 1:00 pm, ESPN2	No. 21	No. 4 Stanford	L 64–79	14–7 (6–4)	Haas Pavilion (5,715); Berkeley, CA
02/07/2014; 8:00 pm, P12N	No. 23	at Washington	W 70–65	15–7 (7–4)	Alaska Airlines Arena (1,782); Seattle, WA
02/09/2014; 2:00 pm, P12N	No. 23	at Washington State	W 87–70	16–7 (8–4)	Beasley Coliseum (693); Pullman, WA
02/14/2014; 7:30 pm, P12N	No. 22	Arizona	W 65–49	17–7 (9–4)	Haas Pavilion (1,390); Berkeley, CA
02/16/2014; 4:00 pm, P12N	No. 22	No. 15 Arizona State	W 74–63	18–7 (10–4)	Haas Pavilion (2,241); Berkeley, CA
02/21/2014; 8:00 pm, P12N	No. 18	at UCLA	W 77–72	19–7 (11–4)	Pauley Pavilion (2,381); Los Angeles, CA
02/23/2014; 12:00 pm, P12N	No. 18	at USC	W 76–67	20–7 (12–4)	Galen Center (1,060); Los Angeles, CA
02/27/2014; 6:00 pm, P12N	No. 18	Washington State	W 75–68 ^{OT}	21–7 (13–4)	Haas Pavilion (1,688); Berkeley, CA
03/01/2014; 5:30 pm, P12N	No. 18	Washington	L 65–70	21–8 (13–5)	Haas Pavilion (3,900); Berkeley, CA
2014 Pac-12 Conference women's tournament
03/07/2014; 6:00 pm, P12N	No. 20	vs. Washington State; Quarterfinals	L 83–91	21–9	KeyArena (N/A); Seattle, WA
NCAA women's tournament
03/22/2014; 1:00 pm, ESPN2	No. 24	vs. Fordham; First Round	W 64–63	22–9	Ferrell Center (N/A); Waco, TX
03/24/2014*; 6:15 pm, ESPN2	No. 24	at No. 6 Baylor; Second Round	L 56–75	22–10	Ferrell Center (5,648); Waco, TX
*Non-conference game. ^{#}Rankings from AP Poll. (#) Tournament seedings in parentheses. All times are in Pacific Time.

== Rankings ==
Ranking movement Legend: ██ Increase in ranking. ██ Decrease in ranking. NR = Not ranked. RV = Received votes.
Poll	Pre	Wk 2	Wk 3	Wk 4	Wk 5	Wk 6	Wk 7	Wk 8	Wk 9	Wk 10	Wk 11	Wk 12	Wk 13	Wk 14	Wk 15	Wk 16	Wk 17	Wk 18	Wk 19	Final
AP	9	10	17	20	21	22	21	23	23	19	15	19	21	23	22	18	18	20	24	24
Coaches	9	11	17	20	21	21	20	22	21	19	15	16	19	22	22	19	18	20	21	22

== See also ==
- 2013–14 California Golden Bears men's basketball team
