= 2013–14 USC Trojans women's basketball team =

Intercollegiate basketball season

2013–14 USC Trojans women's basketball

Pac-12 Tournament Champions

NCAA Women's Tournament, first round
- Conference: Pac-12 Conference
- Record: 22–13 (11–7 Pac-12)
- Head coach: Cynthia Cooper-Dyke
- Assistant coaches: Brandy Manning; Jualeah Woods; Evan Unrau
- Home arena: Galen Center

2013–14 Pac-12 Conference women's basketball standings
	Conf.				Overall
Team	W		L	PCT	W		L	PCT
No. 6 Stanford	17	–	1	.944	33	–	4	.892
No. 24 California	13	–	5	.722	22	–	10	.688
Oregon State	13	–	5	.722	24	–	11	.686
Arizona State	11	–	7	.611	23	–	10	.697
USC †	11	–	7	.611	22	–	13	.629
Washington	10	–	8	.556	20	–	14	.588
Washington State	9	–	9	.500	17	–	17	.500
UCLA	7	–	11	.389	13	–	18	.419
Colorado	6	–	12	.333	19	–	15	.559
Oregon	6	–	12	.333	16	–	16	.500
Utah	4	–	14	.222	12	–	19	.387
Arizona	1	–	17	.056	5	–	25	.167
† 2014 Pac-12 Tournament winner As of 6 April 2014; Rankings from AP poll

The 2013–14 USC Trojans women's basketball team represented University of Southern California during the 2013–14 NCAA Division I women's basketball season. The Trojans, led by first-year head coach Cynthia Cooper-Dyke, played their home games at the Galen Center and were members of the Pac-12 Conference. They finished with a record of 22–13 overall, 11–7 in Pac-12 play for a tie for 4th place. They won the 2014 Pac-12 Conference women's basketball tournament for the first time in school history. They earned an automatic bid to the 2014 NCAA Division I women's basketball tournament, where they lost in the first round to St. John's.

== Roster ==
2013–14 USC Trojans women's basketball team
Players
Coaches

Pos.	#	Name	Height	Year	Previous school	Hometown
G	1	Jordan Adams	6 ft 1 in (1.85 m)	So	Mater Dei HS	Irvine, Calif.
F	2	Deanna Calhoun	6 ft 3 in (1.91 m)	RS So	Albany HS	Albany, Calif.
F	3	Desireé Bradley	6 ft 1 in (1.85 m)	Sr	Carl Albert HS	Oklahoma City, Okla.
G	5	Rachel Totten (W)	5 ft 7 in (1.7 m)	Sr	LACES	Los Angeles, Calif.
F	10	Kate Oliver	6 ft 4 in (1.93 m)	Sr	Lake Ginninderra College/Marist	Beaumont Hills, NSW, Australia
F	11	Cassie Harberts	6 ft 2 in (1.88 m)	Sr	San Clemente HS	San Clemente, Calif.
G	12	Courtney Jaco	5 ft 8 in (1.73 m)	Fr	Windward School	Compton, Calif.
F	13	Kaneisha Horn	6 ft 1 in (1.85 m)	Jr	Ramsay HS/Alabama	Birmingham, Ala.
G	14	Ariya Crook	5 ft 7 in (1.7 m)	Jr	Long Beach Poiy	Los Angeles, Calif.
F	21	Alexyz Vaioletama	6 ft 1 in (1.85 m)	Jr	Mater Dei HS	Fountain Valley, Calif.
G	22	Destinie Gibbs	5 ft 11 in (1.8 m)	So	McEachern HS	Oxford, Ga.
G	23	Brianna Barrett	5 ft 7 in (1.7 m)	So	Oaks Christian HS	Winnetka, Calif.
F	24	Drew Edelman	6 ft 4 in (1.93 m)	Fr	Menlo School	Sunnyvale, Calif.
G	25	Alexis Lloyd	5 ft 10 in (1.78 m)	So	Whitney Young HS/Virginia Tech	Chicago, Ill.
G	32	Kiki Alofaituli	6 ft 1 in (1.85 m)	Jr	Mater Dei HS	Tustin, Calif.
F	43	Thaddesia Southall	6 ft 4 in (1.93 m)	RS Jr	Long Beach Poly	Long Beach, Calif.

Head coach

Cynthia Cooper-Dyke

Assistant coach(es)

Brandy Manning
Jualeah Woods
Evan Unrau

Legend

- (C) Team captain
- (S) Suspended
- (I) Ineligible
- (W) Walk-on
- Injured
- Current redshirt

Roster
Last update: 2013-08-16

== Schedule ==
Date time, TV	Rank^{#}	Opponent^{#}	Result	Record	Site (attendance) city, state
Exhibition
11/01/2013*; 7:00 pm		Westmont College	W 73–38	–	Galen Center (N/A); Los Angeles, CA
Regular season
11/08/2013*; 7:00 pm		at UC Davis	W 64–55	1–0	The Pavilion (1,702); Davis, CA
11/10/2013*; 2:00 pm		at Fresno State	W 63–54	2–0	Save Mart Center (2,240); Fresno, CA
11/22/2013*; 5:00 pm		at No. 20 Oklahoma State	L 51–82	3–1	Gallagher-Iba Arena (2,414); Stillwater, OK
11/25/2013*; 5:00 pm, P12N		No. 17 South Carolina	L 50–70	3–2	Galen Center (897); Los Angeles, CA
11/28/2013*; 5:30 pm		vs. Iowa; Cancún Challenge	L 65–78	3–3	Moon Palace Golf & Spa Resort (507); Cancún, MX
11/29/2013*; 5:30 pm		vs. UNC Wilmington; Cancún Challenge	W 85–59	4–3	Moon Palace Golf & Spa Resort (934); Cancún, MX
11/30/2013*; 3:00 pm		vs. Boston College; Cancún Challenge	W 79–52	5–3	Moon Palace Golf & Spa Resort (934); Cancún, MX
12/10/2013*; 6:00 pm		at Cal State Northridge	L 64–65	5–4	Matadome (406); Northridge, CA
12/19/2013*; 6:00 pm		Saint Mary's	L 55–71	5–5	Galen Center (294); Los Angeles, CA
12/21/2013*; 2:00 pm		Hawaii	W 66–55	6–5	Galen Center (900); Los Angeles, CA
12/28/2013*; 2:00 pm		Long Beach State	W 89–72	7–5	Galen Center (1,132); Los Angeles, CA
12/30/2013; 7:00 pm, P12N		at UCLA	W 56–54	8–5 (1–0)	Pauley Pavilion (3,297); Los Angeles, CA
01/03/2014; 8:00 pm, P12N		No. 12 Colorado	W 55–45	9–5 (2–0)	Galen Center (372); Los Angeles, CA
01/05/2014; 4:00 pm, P12N		Utah	W 55–47	10–5 (3–0)	Galen Center (743); Los Angeles, CA
01/10/2014; 5:00 pm, P12N		at No. 23 Arizona State	L 86–94 ^{OT}	10–6 (3–1)	Wells Fargo Arena (1,558); Tempe, AZ
01/12/2014; 1:00 pm		at Arizona	W 54–45	11–6 (4–1)	McKale Center (N/A); Tucson, AZ
01/17/2014; 6:00 pm, P12N		Oregon State	W 81–60	12–6 (5–1)	Galen Center (409); Los Angeles, CA
01/19/2014; 2:00 pm, P12N		Oregon	W 109–85	13–6 (6–1)	Galen Center (1,020); Los Angeles, CA
01/24/2014; 2:00 pm, P12N		at No. 19 California	W 77–70	14–6 (7–1)	Haas Pavilion (1,699); Berkeley, CA
01/27/2014; 6:00 pm, P12N		at No. 4 Stanford	L 59–86	14–7 (7–2)	Maples Pavilion (3,360); Stanford, CA
01/31/2014; 6:00 pm, P12N		Washington State	L 75–79	14–8 (7–3)	Galen Center (358); Los Angeles, CA
02/02/2014; 11:00 am, P12N		Washington	L 55–63	14–9 (7–4)	Galen Center (423); Los Angeles, CA
02/08/2014; 3:00 pm, P12N		UCLA	W 68–54	15–9 (8–4)	Galen Center (4,254); Los Angeles, CA
02/14/2014; 7:30 pm, P12N		at Oregon	W 88–78	16–9 (9–4)	Matthew Knight Arena (994); Eugene, OR
02/16/2014; 12:00 pm, P12N		at Oregon State	L 48–58	16–10 (9–5)	Gill Coliseum (1,224); Corvallis, OR
02/21/2014; 6:00 pm, ESPN2		No. 5 Stanford	L 59–64	16–11 (9–6)	Galen Center (1,055); Los Angeles, CA
02/23/2014; 12:00 pm, P12N		No. 18 California	L 67–76	16–12 (9–7)	Galen Center (1,060); Los Angeles, CA
02/27/2014; 6:00 pm, P12N		at Utah	W 67–57	17–12 (10–7)	Jon M. Huntsman Center (1,133); Salt Lake City, UT
03/02/2014; 11:00 am, P12N		at Colorado	W 66–59	18–12 (11–7)	Coors Events Center (5,631); Boulder, CO
2014 Pac-12 Conference women's tournament
03/06/2014; 2:30 pm, P12N	(5)	vs. (12) Arizona; First Round	W 59–54	19–12	KeyArena (2,449); Seattle, WA
03/07/2014; 2:30 pm, P12N	(5)	vs. (4) Arizona State; Quarterfinals	W 59–57	20–12	KeyArena (3,282); Seattle, WA
03/08/2014; 6:00 pm, P12N	(5)	vs. (1) No. 4 Stanford; Semifinals	W 72–58	21–12	KeyArena (N/A); Seattle, WA
03/09/2014; 6:00 pm, ESPN	(5)	vs. (3) Oregon State; Championship Game	W 71–62	22–12	KeyArena (4,785); Seattle, WA
2014 NCAA women's tournament
03/22/2014*; 3:30 pm, ESPN2	(9 L)	vs. (8 L) St. John's; First Round	L 68–71	22–13	Thompson–Boling Arena (7,128); Knoxville, TN
*Non-conference game. ^{#}Rankings from AP Poll. (#) Tournament seedings in parentheses. All times are in Pacific Time; L = Louisville regional.

== See also ==
- 2013–14 USC Trojans men's basketball team
