= 2013–14 Colorado Buffaloes women's basketball team =

Intercollegiate basketball season

2013–14 Colorado Buffaloes women's basketball

WNIT, Third Round
- Conference: Pac-12 Conference
- Record: 19–15 (6–12 Pac-12)
- Head coach: Linda Lappe (4th season)
- Associate head coach: Jonas Chatterton
- Assistant coaches: Kelly Rae Finley; LaTonya Watson
- Home arena: Coors Events Center

2013–14 Pac-12 Conference women's basketball standings
	Conf.				Overall
Team	W		L	PCT	W		L	PCT
No. 6 Stanford	17	–	1	.944	33	–	4	.892
No. 24 California	13	–	5	.722	22	–	10	.688
Oregon State	13	–	5	.722	24	–	11	.686
Arizona State	11	–	7	.611	23	–	10	.697
USC †	11	–	7	.611	22	–	13	.629
Washington	10	–	8	.556	20	–	14	.588
Washington State	9	–	9	.500	17	–	17	.500
UCLA	7	–	11	.389	13	–	18	.419
Colorado	6	–	12	.333	19	–	15	.559
Oregon	6	–	12	.333	16	–	16	.500
Utah	4	–	14	.222	12	–	19	.387
Arizona	1	–	17	.056	5	–	25	.167
† 2014 Pac-12 Tournament winner As of 6 April 2014; Rankings from AP poll

The 2013–14 Colorado Buffaloes women's basketball team represented University of Colorado Boulder during the 2013–14 NCAA Division I women's basketball season. The Buffaloes, led by fourth-year head coach Linda Lappe, played their home games at the Coors Events Center and were members of the Pac-12 Conference. They finished with a record of 19–15 overall, 6–12 in Pac-12 play for a tie for a ninth-place finish. They lost in the quarterfinals of the 2014 Pac-12 Conference women's basketball tournament to Stanford. They were invited to the 2014 Women's National Invitation Tournament, where they defeated TCU in the first round and Southern Utah in the second round, before losing to UTEP in the third round.

== Roster ==
2013–14 Colorado Buffaloes women's basketball team
Players
Coaches

Pos.	#	Name	Height	Year	Previous school	Hometown
F	31	Zoe Beard-Fails	6 ft 2 in (1.88 m)	Fr	Georgetown Day [Washington, D.C.]	Herndon, Va.
C	40	Rachel Hargis	6 ft 4 in (1.93 m)	Sr	Robinson	Robinson, Texas
G	4	Desiree Harris	5 ft 8 in (1.73 m)	Fr	St. Joseph Notre Dame	Oakland, Calif.
G/F	24	Lauren Huggins	6 ft 1 in (1.85 m)	Fr	Heritage	Littleton, Colo.
G	1	Lexy Kresl	5 ft 11 in (1.8 m)	Jr	Shadow Mountain	Paradise Valley, Ariz.
F	34	Jen Reese	6 ft 2 in (1.88 m)	Jr	Clackamas	Clackamas, Ore.
F	32	Arielle Roberson	6 ft 1 in (1.85 m)	So	Wagner	San Antonio, Texas
G	21	Jasmine Sborov	6 ft 0 in (1.83 m)	Jr	Round Rock	Round Rock, Texas
G/F	22	Haley Smith	6 ft 1 in (1.85 m)	Fr	Skyline	Sammamish, Wash.
F	50	Jamee Swan	6 ft 2 in (1.88 m)	So	Marana	Tucson, Ariz.
C	3	Bri Watts	6 ft 2 in (1.88 m)	Fr	Clovis West	Fresno, Calif.
G	12	Ashley Wilson	5 ft 8 in (1.73 m)	Sr	Poly	Long Beach, Calif.
G	11	Brittany Wilson	5 ft 7 in (1.7 m)	Sr	Poly	Long Beach, Calif.

Head coach

- Linda Lappe

Assistant coach(es)

- Jonas Chatterton
- Kelly Rae Finley
- LaTonya Watson

Legend

- (C) Team captain
- (S) Suspended
- (I) Ineligible
- (W) Walk-on
- Injured
- Current redshirt

Roster
Last update: 2013-08-16

== Schedule ==
Date time, TV	Rank^{#}	Opponent^{#}	Result	Record	Site (attendance) city, state
Exhibition
11/02/2013*; 7:00 pm	No. 19	Colorado School of Mines	W 91–42	–	Coors Events Center (674); Boulder, CO
Regular season
11/12/2013*; 7:00 pm	No. 17	at Colorado State	W 63–59	1–0	Moby Arena (1,437); Fort Collins, CO
11/15/2013*; 7:00 pm	No. 17	Alcorn State	W 83–33	2–0	Coors Events Center (1,376); Boulder, CO
11/20/2013*; 8:30 pm, P12N	No. 16	Iowa	W 90–87	3–0	Coors Events Center (3,501); Boulder, CO
11/23/2013*; 1:00 pm	No. 16	at New Mexico	W 85–53	4–0	The Pit (5,951); Albuquerque, NM
11/29/2013*; 7:30 pm	No. 14	South Alabama; Omni Hotels Classic semifinals	W 94–61	5–0	Coors Events Center (2,302); Boulder, CO
11/30/2013*; 7:30 pm	No. 14	Rice; Omni Hotels Classic championship	W 75–58	6–0	Coors Events Center (2,171); Boulder, CO
12/04/2013*; 7:00 pm	No. 11	at Wyoming	W 63–59	7–0	Arena-Auditorium (2,956); Laramie, WY
12/07/2013*; 5:00 pm	No. 11	Illinois	W 79–56	8–0	Coors Events Center (2,090); Boulder, CO
12/12/2013*; 7:00 pm	No. 11	Denver	W 83–61	9–0	Coors Events Center (1,663); Boulder, CO
12/21/2013*; 11:00 am	No. 11	at No. 7 Louisville	L 62–69	9–1	KFC Yum! Center (9,812); Louisville, KY
12/29/2013*; 2:00 pm	No. 12	Southern Utah	W 75–59	10–1	Coors Events Center (2,094); Boulder, CO
01/03/2013; 9:00 pm, P12N	No. 12	at USC	L 45–55	10–2 (0–1)	Galen Center (372); Los Angeles, CA
01/05/2013; 8:30 pm, P12N	No. 12	at UCLA	W 61–59	11–2 (1–1)	Pauley Pavilion (1,494); Los Angeles, CA
01/10/2013; 8:00 pm, P12N	No. 17	No. 19 California	L 55–57	11–3 (1–2)	Coors Events Center (2,432); Boulder, CO
01/12/2013; 3:00 pm, P12N	No. 17	No. 4 Stanford	L 77–87	11–4 (1–3)	Coors Events Center (3,099); Boulder, CO
01/17/2013; 8:00 pm	No. 21	at Washington State	L 60–70	11–5 (1–4)	Beasley Coliseum (1,423); Pullman, WA
01/19/2013; 5:00 pm, P12N	No. 21	at Washington	L 71–81	11–6 (1–5)	Alaska Airlines Arena (1,371); Seattle, WA
01/24/2013; 7:00 pm		Arizona	W 68–47	12–6 (2–5)	Coors Events Center (2,914); Boulder, CO
01/26/2013; 1:00 pm, P12N		No. 14 Arizona State	L 66–68	12–7 (2–6)	Coors Events Center (3,326); Boulder, CO
01/29/2013; 7:00 pm, P12N		at Utah	L 55–58	12–8 (2–7)	Jon M. Huntsman Center (855); Salt Lake City, UT
02/02/2013; 12:00 pm, P12N		Utah	W 61–45	13–8 (3–7)	Coors Events Center (1,738); Boulder, CO
02/08/2013; 1:00 pm		at Oregon State	L 63–75	13–9 (3–8)	Gill Coliseum (502); Corvallis, OR
02/10/2013; 6:00 pm		at Oregon	W 81–75	14–9 (4–8)	Matthew Knight Arena (947); Eugene, OR
02/14/2013; 6:30 pm, P12N		Washington	L 80–87	14–10 (4–9)	Coors Events Center (1,880); Boulder, CO
02/16/2013; 1:00 pm, P12N		Washington State	L 77–80	14–11 (4–10)	Coors Events Center (2,446); Boulder, CO
02/21/2013; 6:30 pm		at No. 20 Arizona State	L 51–55	14–12 (4–11)	Wells Fargo Arena (1,859); Tempe, AZ
02/23/2013; 3:00 pm, P12N		at Arizona	W 61–56 ^{OT}	15–12 (5–11)	McKale Center (1,253); Tucson, AZ
02/28/2013; 6:00 pm, P12N		UCLA	W 62–42	16–12 (6–11)	Coors Events Center (4,477); Boulder, CO
03/02/2013; 12:00 pm, P12N		USC	L 59–66	16–13 (6–12)	Coors Events Center (5,631); Boulder, CO
2014 Pac-12 Conference women's tournament
03/06/2014; 1:00 pm, P12N		vs. UCLA; First Round	W 76–65	17–13	KeyArena (N/A); Seattle, WA
03/07/2014; 1:00 pm, P12N		vs. No. 4 Stanford; Quarterfinals	L 54–69	17–14	KeyArena (N/A); Seattle, WA
2014 WNIT
03/19/2014*; 7:00 pm		TCU; First Round	W 78–71	18–14	Coors Events Center (789); Boulder, CO
03/22/2014*; 7:00 pm		Southern Utah; Second Round	W 79–68	19–14	Coors Events Center (854); Boulder, CO
03/28/2014*; 7:00 pm		at UTEP; Third Round	L 60–68	19–15	Don Haskins Center (8,234); El Paso, TX
*Non-conference game. ^{#}Rankings from AP Poll. (#) Tournament seedings in parentheses. All times are in Mountain Time.

== Rankings ==
Ranking movement Legend: ██ Increase in ranking. ██ Decrease in ranking. NR = Not ranked. RV = Received votes.
Poll	Pre	Wk 2	Wk 3	Wk 4	Wk 5	Wk 6	Wk 7	Wk 8	Wk 9	Wk 10	Wk 11	Wk 12	Wk 13	Wk 14	Wk 15	Wk 16	Wk 17	Wk 18	Wk 19	Final
AP	19	17	16	14	11	11	11	12	12	17	21	RV	NR	NR	NR	NR	NR	NR	NR	NR
Coaches	19	19	20	19	17	15	14	14	14	18	20	RV	RV	NR	NR	NR	NR	NR	NR	NR

== See also ==
- 2013–14 Colorado Buffaloes men's basketball team
