= 2013–14 Oregon State Beavers women's basketball team =

Intercollegiate basketball season

2013–14 Oregon State Beavers women's basketball

NCAA Women's Basketball, second round
- Conference: Pac-12 Conference
- Record: 24–11 (13–5 Pac-12)
- Head coach: Scott Rueck (4th season)
- Associate head coach: Mark Campbell
- Assistant coaches: Eric Ely; Mandy Close
- Home arena: Gill Coliseum

2013–14 Pac-12 Conference women's basketball standings
	Conf.				Overall
Team	W		L	PCT	W		L	PCT
No. 6 Stanford	17	–	1	.944	33	–	4	.892
No. 24 California	13	–	5	.722	22	–	10	.688
Oregon State	13	–	5	.722	24	–	11	.686
Arizona State	11	–	7	.611	23	–	10	.697
USC †	11	–	7	.611	22	–	13	.629
Washington	10	–	8	.556	20	–	14	.588
Washington State	9	–	9	.500	17	–	17	.500
UCLA	7	–	11	.389	13	–	18	.419
Colorado	6	–	12	.333	19	–	15	.559
Oregon	6	–	12	.333	16	–	16	.500
Utah	4	–	14	.222	12	–	19	.387
Arizona	1	–	17	.056	5	–	25	.167
† 2014 Pac-12 Tournament winner As of 6 April 2014; Rankings from AP poll

The 2013–14 Oregon State Beavers women's basketball team represented Oregon State University during the 2013–14 NCAA Division I women's basketball season. The Beavers, led by fourth year head coach Scott Rueck, played their games at the Gill Coliseum and were members of the Pac-12 Conference. They finished with a record of 24–11 overall, 13–5 in Pac-12 play for a tie for a second-place finish. They lost in the championship game in the 2014 Pac-12 Conference women's basketball tournament to USC. They were invited to the 2014 NCAA Division I women's basketball tournament, where they defeated Middle Tennessee State in the first round before losing to South Carolina in the second round.

== Roster ==
#	Name	Height	Position	Class	Hometown
2	Khadidja Toure	6'3"	F	Sophomore	Kennewick, WA
4	Breana Brown	6'3"	F/C	Freshman	Oakland, CA
5	Samantha Siegner	6'3"	F	Sophomore	Albany, OR
11	Gabriella Hanson	5'11"	G	Freshman	Anaheim, CA
12	Kolbie Orum	6'3"	F	Freshman	Maple Ridge, BC
14	Allison Gibson	5'11"	G	Junior	Woodbridge, CA
15	Jamie Weisner	5'10"	G	Sophomore	Clarkson, WA
21	Sydney Wiese	6'0"	G	Freshman	Phoenix, AZ
24	Alyssa Martin	6'0"	G	Senior	Portland, OR
32	Deven Hunter	6'3"	F	Sophomore	Keizer, OR
44	Ruth Hamblin	6'6"	C	Sophomore	Houston, BC

== Schedule ==
Date time, TV	Rank^{#}	Opponent^{#}	Result	Record	Site (attendance) city, state
Exitbition
11/02/2013*; 1:00 pm		Saint Martin's	W 100–39	–	Gill Coliseum (798); Corvallis, OR
Regular season
11/08/2013*; 7:00 pm		Corban	W 94–49	1–0	Gill Coliseum (839); Corvallis, OR
11/11/2013*; 7:00 pm		Cal State Bakersfield	W 80–49	2–0	Gill Coliseum (1,042); Corvallis, OR
11/15/2013*; 11:30 am		Sacramento State	W 102–80	3–0	Gill Coliseum (4,139); Corvallis, OR
11/21/2013*; 6:00 pm		Loyola Marymount	W 93–54	4–0	Gill Coliseum (923); Corvallis, OR
11/29/2013*; 12:15 pm		vs. No. 13 Penn State; Junkanoo Jam semifinals	L 56–61	4–1	St. George HS Gymnasium (273); Freeport, BAH
11/30/2013*; 10:45 am		vs. Florida; Junkanoo Jam consolation game	L 70–73	4–2	St. George HS Gymnasium (257); Freeport, BAH
12/06/2013*; 7:00 pm		at Portland	W 79–73	5–2	Chiles Center (402); Portland, OR
12/13/2013*; 7:00 pm		Hawaiʻi	W 76–64	6–2	Gill Coliseum (2,369); Corvallis, OR
12/19/2013*; 7:30 pm		vs. Creighton; Duel in the Desert	L 62–70	6–3	Cox Pavilion (826); Paradise, NV
12/20/2013*; 5:00 pm		at UNLV; Duel in the Desert	W 68–66	7–3	Cox Pavilion (N/A); Paradise, NV
12/21/2013*; 5:00 pm		vs. Clemson; Duel in the Desert	W 74–41	8–3	Cox Pavilion (N/A); Paradise, NV
12/29/2013*; 2:00 pm, P12N		No. 2 Notre Dame	L 58–70	8–4	Gill Coliseum (4,032); Corvallis, OR
01/03/2014; 8:00 pm, P12N		at No. 23 California	L 63–72	8–5 (0–1)	Haas Pavilion (1,643); Berkeley, CA
01/05/2014; 2:00 pm, P12N		at No. 4 Stanford	L 67–89	8–6 (0–2)	Maples Pavilion (N/A); Stanford, CA
01/11/2014; 5:00 pm, P12N		at Oregon; Civil War	W 88–80	9–6 (1–2)	Matthew Knight Arena (1,591); Eugene, OR
01/13/2014; 7:00 pm, P12N		Oregon; Civil War	W 84–70	10–6 (2–2)	Gill Coliseum (1,625); Corvallis, OR
01/17/2014; 6:00 pm, P12N		at USC	L 60–81	10–7 (2–3)	Galen Center (409); Los Angeles, CA
01/20/2014; 12:00 pm, P12N		at UCLA	L 63–66	10–8 (2–4)	Pauley Pavilion (1,485); Los Angeles, CA
01/24/2014; 6:00 pm, P12N		Washington	W 75–68	11–8 (3–4)	Gill Coliseum (1,121); Corvallis, OR
01/26/2014; 2:00 pm		Washington State	W 72–55	12–8 (4–4)	Gill Coliseum (1,409); Corvallis, OR
01/31/2014; 5:30 pm		at No. 15 Arizona State	L 62–64	12–9 (4–5)	Wells Fargo Arena (2,018); Tempe, AZ
02/02/2014; 11:00 am, P12N		at Arizona	W 64–50	13–9 (5–5)	McKale Center (983); Tucson, AZ
02/08/2014; 12:00 pm		Colorado	W 75–63	14–9 (6–5)	Gill Coliseum (502); Corvallis, OR
02/10/2014; 6:00 pm, P12N		Utah	W 60–47	15–9 (7–5)	Gill Coliseum (572); Corvallis, OR
02/14/2014; 7:00 pm		UCLA	W 70–54	16–9 (8–5)	Gill Coliseum (1,101); Corvallis, OR
02/16/2014; 12:00 pm, P12N		USC	W 58–48	17–9 (9–5)	Gill Coliseum (1,224); Corvallis, OR
02/21/2014; 7:00 pm		at Washington State	W 67–53	18–9 (10–5)	Beasley Coliseum (821); Pullman, WA
02/23/2014; 2:00 pm		at Washington	W 77–57	19–9 (11–5)	Alaska Airlines Arena (2,737); Seattle, WA
02/28/2014; 7:00 pm		Arizona	W 78–48	20–9 (12–5)	Gill Coliseum (4,631); Corvallis, OR
03/02/2014; 1:00 pm		No. 20 Arizona State	W 66–43	21–9 (13–5)	Gill Coliseum (5,208); Corvallis, OR
2014 Pac-12 Tournament
03/07/2014; 8:30 pm, P12N		vs. Utah; Quarterfinals	W 50–35	22–9	KeyArena (4,396); Seattle, WA
03/08/2014; 8:30 pm, P12N		vs. Washington State; Semifinals	W 70–60	23–9	KeyArena (6,073); Seattle, WA
03/09/2014; 6:00 pm, ESPN		vs. USC; Championship Game	L 62–71	23–10	KeyArena (4,785); Seattle, WA
2014 NCAA women's tournament
03/23/2014*; 5:00 pm, ESPN2		vs. No. 22 Middle Tennessee; First Round	W 55–36	24–10	Alaska Airlines Arena (2,214); Seattle, WA
03/25/2014*; 6:30 pm, ESPN2		vs. No. 8 South Carolina; Second Round	L 69–78	24–11	Alaska Airlines Arena (1,664); Seattle, WA
*Non-conference game. ^{#}Rankings from AP Poll. (#) Tournament seedings in parentheses. All times are in Pacific Time.

== Rankings ==
Ranking movement Legend: ██ Increase in ranking. ██ Decrease in ranking. NR = Not ranked. RV = Received votes.
Poll	Pre	Wk 2	Wk 3	Wk 4	Wk 5	Wk 6	Wk 7	Wk 8	Wk 9	Wk 10	Wk 11	Wk 12	Wk 13	Wk 14	Wk 15	Wk 16	Wk 17	Wk 18	Wk 19	Final
AP	NR	NR	NR	NR	NR	NR	NR	NR	NR	NR	NR	NR	NR	NR	NR	NR	RV	RV	RV	RV
Coaches	NR	NR	NR	NR	NR	NR	NR	NR	NR	NR	NR	NR	NR	NR	NR	RV	RV	RV	RV	RV

== See also ==
- 2013–14 Oregon State Beavers men's basketball team
