= 2013–14 Arizona State Sun Devils women's basketball team =

Intercollegiate basketball season

2013–14 Arizona State Sun Devils women's basketball

NCAA Women's Tournament, second round
- Conference: Pac-12 Conference
- Record: 23–10 (11–7 Pac-12)
- Head coach: Charli Turner Thorne (17th season)
- Assistant coaches: Amanda Levens; Meg Sanders; Jackie Moore
- Home arena: Wells Fargo Arena

2013–14 Pac-12 Conference women's basketball standings
	Conf.				Overall
Team	W		L	PCT	W		L	PCT
No. 6 Stanford	17	–	1	.944	33	–	4	.892
No. 24 California	13	–	5	.722	22	–	10	.688
Oregon State	13	–	5	.722	24	–	11	.686
Arizona State	11	–	7	.611	23	–	10	.697
USC †	11	–	7	.611	22	–	13	.629
Washington	10	–	8	.556	20	–	14	.588
Washington State	9	–	9	.500	17	–	17	.500
UCLA	7	–	11	.389	13	–	18	.419
Colorado	6	–	12	.333	19	–	15	.559
Oregon	6	–	12	.333	16	–	16	.500
Utah	4	–	14	.222	12	–	19	.387
Arizona	1	–	17	.056	5	–	25	.167
† 2014 Pac-12 Tournament winner As of 6 April 2014; Rankings from AP poll

The 2013–14 Arizona State Sun Devils women's basketball team represented Arizona State University during the 2013–14 NCAA Division I women's basketball season. The Sun Devils, led by seventeenth year head coach Charli Turner Thorne, played their games at the Wells Fargo Arena and were members of the Pac-12 Conference. They finished with a record of 23–10 overall, 13–5 in Pac-12 play for a tie for a second-place finish. They lost in the quarterfinals in the 2014 Pac-12 Conference women's basketball tournament to USC. They were invited to the 2014 NCAA Division I women's basketball tournament, where they defeated Vanderbilt in the first round before falling to Notre Dame in the second round.

== Roster ==
#	Name	Height	Position	Class	Hometown
0	Katie Hempen	5'9"	G	RS Sophomore	Highland, IL
1	Arnecia Hawkins	5'10"	G	Sophomore	Mesa, AZ
3	Joy Burke	6'5"	C	RS Senior	Tempe, AZ
5	Deja Mann	5'7"	G	RS Senior	Merced, AZ
10	Promise Amukamara	5'8"	G	Junior	Glendale, AZ
14	Adrianne Thomas	5'9"	G	Senior	Fontana, CA
15	Nisha Barrett	6'1"	F	Senior	Barstow, CA
20	Isidora Purkovic	5'11"	G	Sophomore	Calgary, AB, Canada
21	Sophie Brunner	6'1"	F	Freshman	Freeport, IL
22	Quinn Dornstauder	6'4"	C	Freshman	Regina, SK, Canada
23	Elisha Davis	5'3"	G	Sophomore	Oakland, CA
24	Kelsey Moos	6'0"	F	Freshman	Edwall, WA
43	Eliza Normen	6'0"	G	RS Sophomore	Louisville, CO

== Schedule ==
Date time, TV	Rank^{#}	Opponent^{#}	Result	Record	Site (attendance) city, state
Regular season
11/09/2013*; 4:00 pm		Hawaii	W 84–44	1–0	Wells Fargo Arena (1,584); Tempe, AZ
11/13/2013*; 6:15 pm		at San Diego	L 53–61	1–1	Jenny Craig Pavilion (337); San Diego, CA
11/17/2013*; 1:00 pm		at Texas Tech	W 85–77	2–1	United Spirit Arena (3,413); Lubbock, TX
11/23/2013*; 4:00 pm		Providence	W 86–65	3–1	Wells Fargo Arena (1,427); Tempe, AZ
11/28/2013*; 11:00 am		vs. Illinois; Cancún Challenge	W 84–60	4–1	Moon Palace Golf & Spa Resort (934); Cancún, MX
11/29/2013*; 11:00 am		vs. No. 11 North Carolina; Cancún Challenge	W 94–91 ^{OT}	5–1	Moon Palace Golf & Spa Resort (502); Cancún, MX
11/30/2013*; 11:00 am		vs. Arkansas State; Cancún Challenge	W 69–66	6–1	Moon Palace Golf & Spa Resort (934); Cancún, MX
12/07/2013*; 11:30 am		Sacred Heart; ASU Classic	W 81–49	7–1	Wells Fargo Arena (1,283); Tempe, AZ
12/08/2013*; 2:25 pm		Long Beach State; ASU Classic	W 74–67 ^{OT}	8–1	Wells Fargo Arena (1,283); Tempe, AZ
12/14/2013*; 6:00 pm		at Cal State Fullerton	W 81–55	9–1	Titan Gym (176); Fullerton, CA
12/21/2013*; 12:30 pm, P12N		Miami (FL)	W 75–73	10–1	Wells Fargo Arena (2,358); Tempe, AZ
12/30/2013*; 6:00 pm, P12N	No. 24	No. 20 Syracuse	W 63–60	11–1	Wells Fargo Arena (2,421); Tempe, AZ
01/03/2014; 8:00 pm	No. 24	at Washington State	L 78–85	11–2 (0–1)	Beasley Coliseum (889); Pullman, WA
01/05/2014; 3:00 pm, P12N	No. 24	at Washington	W 78–60	12–2 (1–1)	Alaska Airlines Arena (2,384); Seattle, WA
01/10/2014; 6:00 pm, P12N	No. 23	USC	W 94–86 ^{OT}	13–2 (2–1)	Wells Fargo Arena (1,558); Tempe, AZ
01/12/2014; 1:00 pm, P12N	No. 23	UCLA	W 59–57	14–2 (3–1)	Wells Fargo Arena (2,425); Tempe, AZ
01/17/2014; 11:00 am	No. 19	No. 15 California	W 68–59	15–2 (4–1)	Wells Fargo Arena (4,077); Tempe, AZ
01/20/2014; 5:00 pm, P12N	No. 19	No. 4 Stanford	L 56–80	15–3 (4–2)	Wells Fargo Arena (2,399); Tempe, AZ
01/24/2014; 7:00 pm	No. 14	at Utah	W 65–62	16–3 (5–2)	Jon M. Huntsman Center (1,007); Salt Lake City, UT
01/26/2014; 1:00 pm, P12N	No. 14	at Colorado	W 68–66	17–3 (6–2)	Coors Events Center (3,326); Boulder, CO
01/31/2014; 6:30 pm	No. 15	Oregon State	W 64–62	18–3 (7–2)	Wells Fargo Arena (2,018); Tempe, AZ
02/02/2014; 1:00 pm	No. 15	Oregon	W 97–94	19–3 (8–2)	Wells Fargo Arena (1,340); Tempe, AZ
02/04/2014; 7:30 pm, P12N	No. 11	Arizona; Territorial Cup	W 60–36	20–3 (9–2)	Wells Fargo Arena (2,478); Tempe, AZ
02/09/2014; 1:00 pm, P12N	No. 11	at Arizona; Territorial Cup	L 49–68	20–4 (9–3)	McKale Center (N/A); Tucson, AZ
02/14/2014; 8:00 pm	No. 15	at No. 6 Stanford	L 35–61	20–5 (9–4)	Maples Pavilion (3,450); Stanford, CA
02/16/2014; 5:00 pm, P12N	No. 15	at No. 22 California	L 63–74	20–6 (9–5)	Haas Pavilion (2,241); Berkeley, CA
02/21/2014; 6:30 pm	No. 20	Colorado	W 55–51	21–6 (10–5)	Wells Fargo Arena (1,859); Tempe, AZ
02/23/2014; 1:00 pm, P12N	No. 20	Utah	W 60–40	22–6 (11–5)	Wells Fargo Arena (2,008); Tempe, AZ
02/28/2014; 8:00 pm	No. 20	at Oregon	L 90–98	22–7 (11–6)	Matthew Knight Arena (1,122); Eugene, OR
03/02/2014; 2:00 pm	No. 20	at Oregon State	L 43–66	22–8 (11–7)	Gill Coliseum (5,208); Corvallis, OR
2014 Pac-12 Tournament
03/07/2014; 3:30 pm, P12N		vs. USC; Quarterfinals	L 57–59	22–9	KeyArena (3,282); Seattle, WA
2014 NCAA women's tournament
03/22/2014*; 8:00 am, ESPN2		vs. Vanderbilt; First Round	W 69–61	23–9	Savage Arena (N/A); Toledo, OH
03/24/2014*; 3:30 pm, ESPN2		vs. No. 2 Notre Dame; Second Round	L 67–84	23–10	Savage Arena (3,544); Toledo, OH
*Non-conference game. ^{#}Rankings from AP Poll. (#) Tournament seedings in parentheses. All times are in Mountain Time.

== Rankings ==
Ranking movement Legend: ██ Increase in ranking. ██ Decrease in ranking. NR = Not ranked. RV = Received votes.
Poll	Pre	Wk 2	Wk 3	Wk 4	Wk 5	Wk 6	Wk 7	Wk 8	Wk 9	Wk 10	Wk 11	Wk 12	Wk 13	Wk 14	Wk 15	Wk 16	Wk 17	Wk 18	Wk 19	Final
AP	NR	NR	NR	NR	NR	RV	RV	RV	24	23	19	14	15	11	15	20	20	RV	RV	RV
Coaches	NR	NR	NR	NR	RV	RV	RV	RV	25	RV	24	23	20	16	21	24	22	RV	RV	RV

== See also ==
- 2013–14 Arizona State Sun Devils men's basketball team
