= 2014 Pac-12 Conference women's basketball tournament =

- Classification: Division I
- Season: 2013–14
- Teams: 12
- Site: KeyArena; Seattle, WA
- Champions: USC (1st title)
- Winning coach: Cynthia Cooper-Dyke (1st title)
- MVP: Ariya Crook (USC)
- Television: Pac-12 Network and ESPN

2013–14 Pac-12 Conference women's basketball standings
	Conf.				Overall
Team	W		L	PCT	W		L	PCT
No. 6 Stanford	17	–	1	.944	33	–	4	.892
No. 24 California	13	–	5	.722	22	–	10	.688
Oregon State	13	–	5	.722	24	–	11	.686
Arizona State	11	–	7	.611	23	–	10	.697
USC †	11	–	7	.611	22	–	13	.629
Washington	10	–	8	.556	20	–	14	.588
Washington State	9	–	9	.500	17	–	17	.500
UCLA	7	–	11	.389	13	–	18	.419
Colorado	6	–	12	.333	19	–	15	.559
Oregon	6	–	12	.333	16	–	16	.500
Utah	4	–	14	.222	12	–	19	.387
Arizona	1	–	17	.056	5	–	25	.167
† 2014 Pac-12 Tournament winner As of 6 April 2014; Rankings from AP poll

The 2014 Pac-12 Conference women's basketball tournament was the 2014 edition of the Pac-12 Conference's championship tournament. It was held at the KeyArena in Seattle, Washington from March 6–9, 2014. USC defeated Oregon State 71-62 to win their first Pac-12 Tournament in school history.

== Seeds ==
Teams were seeded by conference record, with ties broken by record between the tied teams followed by record against the regular-season champion, if necessary.

Seed	School	Conf (Overall)	Tiebreaker
#1	Stanford	17–1	
#2	California	13–5	1–0 vs. ORST
#3	Oregon State	13–5	0–1 vs. ORST
#4	Arizona State	11–7	1–0 vs. USC
#5	USC	11–7	0–1 vs. ASU
#6	Washington	10–8	
#7	Washington State	9–9	
#8	UCLA	7-11	
#9	Colorado	6-12	1–0 vs. OREG
#10	Oregon	6-12	0–1 vs. COLO
#11	Utah	4–14	
#12	Arizona	1–17	

== Schedule ==
Thursday-Sunday, March 6–9, 2014

The top four seeds received a first-round bye.

Session	Game	Time*	Matchup^{#}	Television	Attendance
First round – Thursday, March 6
1	1	12:00 PM	UCLA vs. Colorado	Pac-12 Network	2,449
1	2	2:30 PM	USC vs. Arizona	Pac-12 Network	2,449
2	3	6:00 PM	Washington State vs. Oregon	Pac-12 Network	2,449
2	4	8:30 PM	Washington vs. Utah	Pac-12 Network	2,449
Quarterfinals – Friday, March 7
3	5	12:00 PM	Stanford vs. Colorado	Pac-12 Network	3,282
3	6	2:30 PM	Arizona State vs. USC	Pac-12 Network	3,282
4	7	6:00 PM	California vs. Washington State	Pac-12 Network	4,396
4	8	8:30 PM	Oregon State vs. Utah	Pac-12 Network	4,396
Semifinals – Saturday, March 8
5	9	6:00 PM	Stanford vs. USC	Pac-12 Network	6,073
5	10	8:30 PM	Washington State vs. Oregon State	Pac-12 Network	6,073
Championship Game – Sunday, March 9
6	11	6:00 PM	USC vs. Oregon State	ESPN	4,785
*Game Times in PT.

== Bracket ==
First round
8	UCLA	65
9	Colorado	76
5	USC	59
12	Arizona	54
7	Washington State	107
10	Oregon	100
6	Washington	53
11	Utah	65

Quarterfinals
1	#4 Stanford	69
9	Colorado	54
4	Arizona State	57
5	USC	59
2	#20 California	83
7	Washington State	91
3	Oregon State	50
11	Utah	35

Semifinals
1	#4 Stanford	68
5	USC	72
7	Washington State	60
3	Oregon State	70

Championship game
5	USC	71
3	Oregon State	62

=== All-Tournament Team ===
Name	Pos.	Year	Team
Ariya Crook	G	Jr.	USC
Lia Galdiera	G	So.	Washington State
Ruth Hamblin	C	So.	Oregon State
Cassie Harberts	F	Sr.	USC
Chiney Ogwumike	F	Sr.	Stanford
Sydney Wiese	G	Fr.	Oregon State

=== Most Outstanding Player ===
Name	Pos.	Year	Team
Ariya Crook	G	Jr.	USC

== See also ==
2014 Pac-12 Conference men's basketball tournament
