= 2013–14 Stanford Cardinal women's basketball team =

Intercollegiate basketball season

2013–14 Stanford Cardinal women's basketball

Pac-12 regular season champions Hardwood Tournament of Hope champions

NCAA tournament, final Four
- Conference: Pac-12 Conference

Ranking
- Coaches: No. 5
- AP: No. 6
- Record: 33–4 (17–1 Pac-12)
- Head coach: Tara VanDerveer (28th season)
- Assistant coaches: Amy Tucker; Kate Paye; Tempie Brown
- Home arena: Maples Pavilion

2013–14 Pac-12 Conference women's basketball standings
	Conf.				Overall
Team	W		L	PCT	W		L	PCT
No. 6 Stanford	17	–	1	.944	33	–	4	.892
No. 24 California	13	–	5	.722	22	–	10	.688
Oregon State	13	–	5	.722	24	–	11	.686
Arizona State	11	–	7	.611	23	–	10	.697
USC †	11	–	7	.611	22	–	13	.629
Washington	10	–	8	.556	20	–	14	.588
Washington State	9	–	9	.500	17	–	17	.500
UCLA	7	–	11	.389	13	–	18	.419
Colorado	6	–	12	.333	19	–	15	.559
Oregon	6	–	12	.333	16	–	16	.500
Utah	4	–	14	.222	12	–	19	.387
Arizona	1	–	17	.056	5	–	25	.167
† 2014 Pac-12 Tournament winner As of 6 April 2014; Rankings from AP poll

The 2013–14 Stanford Cardinal women's basketball team represented Stanford University during the 2013–14 NCAA Division I women's basketball season. The Cardinal, led by 28h-year head coach Tara VanDerveer, played their home games at the Maples Pavilion and were members of the Pac-12 Conference. They finished the season with a 33–4 overall, 17–1 to win their 24th regular season Pac-12 title. They lost in the quarterfinals of the 2014 Pac-12 Conference women's basketball tournament to USC. They were invited to the 2014 NCAA Division I women's basketball tournament, where they defeated South Dakota in the first round, Florida State in the second round, Penn State in the sweet sixteen, and North Carolina in the elite eight, to make their twelfth Final Four appearance. In the final four, the Cardinal were defeated by the 2014 NCAA Division I women's basketball tournament champion, Connecticut.

== Roster ==
2013–14 Stanford Cardinal women's basketball team
Players
Coaches

Pos.	#	Name	Height	Year	Previous school	Hometown
G	23	Jasmine Camp	5 ft 7 in (1.7 m)	RS So	Chamblee	Ellenwood, Ga.
G	00	Alex Green	5 ft 6 in (1.68 m)	RS So	Bishop Lynch	Dallas, Texas
F	4	Taylor Greenfield	6 ft 3 in (1.91 m)	Jr	Ballard Community	Huxley, Iowa
G	21	Sara James	5 ft 10 in (1.78 m)	Sr	Oak Ridge	El Dorado Hills, Calif.
F	32	Kailee Johnson	6 ft 3 in (1.91 m)	Fr	Central Catholic	Portland, Ore.
F	31	Toni Kokenis (injured)	5 ft 11 in (1.8 m)	Sr	Hinsdale Central	Oak Brook, Ill.
F	24	Erica McCall	6 ft 3 in (1.91 m)	Fr	Ridgeview	Bakersfield, Calif.
F	13	Chiney Ogwumike	6 ft 4 in (1.93 m)	Sr	Cy-Fair	Cypress, Texas
G	33	Amber Orrange	5 ft 7 in (1.7 m)	Jr	Westbury Christian	Houston, Texas
F	25	Erica Payne	6 ft 2 in (1.88 m)	Jr	Carondelet	Concord, Calif.
F/C	34	Tess Picknell	6 ft 5 in (1.96 m)	So	South Medford	Medford, Ore.
G	10	Briana Roberson	5 ft 7 in (1.7 m)	Fr	Troy	Fullerton, Calif.
F	3	Mikaela Ruef	6 ft 3 in (1.91 m)	RS Sr	Beavercreek	Beavercreek, Ohio
F	41	Bonnie Samuelson	6 ft 3 in (1.91 m)	Jr	Edison	Huntington Beach, Calif.
F	44	Karlie Samuelson	5 ft 11 in (1.8 m)	Fr	Mater Dei	Huntington Beach, Calif.
G	1	Lili Thompson	5 ft 7 in (1.7 m)	Fr	Timberview	Mansfield, Texas

Head coach

- Tara VanDerveer

Assistant coach(es)

- Amy Tucker
- Kate Paye
- Tempie Brown
- Trina Patterson

Legend

- (C) Team captain
- (S) Suspended
- (I) Ineligible
- (W) Walk-on
- Injured
- Current redshirt

Roster
Last update: 2013-09-02

== Schedule ==
Date time, TV	Rank^{#}	Opponent^{#}	Result	Record	Site (attendance) city, state
Exhibition
11/03/2013*; 2:00 pm	No. 3	Vanguard	W 79–47	–	Maples Pavilion (N/A); Stanford, CA
Regular season
11/09/2013*; 10:00 am	No. 3	at Boston College	W 83–71	1–0	Conte Forum (1,628); Chestnut Hill, MA
11/11/2013*; 4:00 pm, ESPN2	No. 3	at No. 1 Connecticut; Rivalry	L 57–76	1–1	Gampel Pavilion (9,529); Storrs, CT
11/15/2013*; 7:00 pm	No. 3	Cal Poly	W 86–51	2–1	Maples Pavilion (3,913); Stanford, CA
11/17/2013*; 7:00 pm	No. 3	UC Davis	W 66–48	3–1	Maples Pavilion (3,202); Stanford, CA
11/23/2013*; 10:30 am, FSN	No. 6	at Texas	W 63–54	4–1	Frank Erwin Center (3,909); Austin, TX
11/26/2013*; 2:00 pm	No. 6	vs. No. 16 Purdue; Hardwood Tournament of Hope	W 86–69	5–1	Puerto Vallarta International Convention Center (100); Puerto Vallarta, MX
11/27/2013*; 2:30 pm	No. 6	vs. Florida Gulf Coast; Hardwood Tournament of Hope	W 83–59	6–1	Puerto Vallarta International Convention Center (N/A); Puerto Vallarta, MX
11/28/2013*; 2:00 pm	No. 6	vs. South Dakota State; Hardwood Tournament of Hope	W 80–60	7–1	Puerto Vallarta International Convention Center (N/A); Puerto Vallarta, MX
12/14/2013*; 1:00 pm, P12N	No. 6	No. 23 Gonzaga	W 73–45	8–1	Maples Pavilion (N/A); Stanford, CA
12/16/2013*; 7:00 pm, P12N	No. 6	New Mexico	W 75–41	9–1	Maples Pavilion (3,397); Stanford, CA
12/21/2013*; 1:30 pm, P12N	No. 6	No. 3 Tennessee; Rivalry	W 76–70	10–1	Maples Pavilion (6,044); Stanford, CA
12/28/2013*; 7:00 pm	No. 4	at Fresno State	W 86–54	11–1	Save Mart Center (4,833); Fresno, CA
01/03/2014; 6:00 pm, P12N	No. 4	Oregon	W 96–66	12–1 (1–0)	Maples Pavilion (3,495); Stanford, CA
01/05/2014; 2:00 pm, P12N	No. 4	Oregon State	W 89–67	13–1 (2–0)	Maples Pavilion (N/A); Stanford, CA
01/10/2014; 5:00 pm, P12N	No. 4	at Utah	W 87–61	14–1 (3–0)	Jon M. Huntsman Center (1,652); Salt Lake City, UT
01/12/2014; 2:00 pm, P12N	No. 4	at No. 17 Colorado	W 87–77	15–1 (4–0)	Coors Events Center (3,009); Boulder, CO
01/17/2014; 6:00 pm, P12N	No. 4	at Arizona	W 96–52	16–1 (5–0)	McKale Center (1,169); Tucson, AZ
01/20/2014; 4:00 pm, P12N	No. 4	at No. 19 Arizona State	W 80–56	17–1 (6–0)	Wells Fargo Arena (2,399); Tempe, AZ
01/24/2014; 8:00 pm, P12N	No. 4	UCLA	W 72–55	18–1 (7–0)	Maples Pavilion (4,434); Stanford, CA
01/27/2014; 6:00 pm, ESPN2	No. 4	USC	W 86–59	19–1 (8–0)	Maples Pavilion (3,360); Stanford, CA
01/30/2014; 8:00 pm, P12N	No. 4	No. 21 California	W 70–64	20–1 (9–0)	Maples Pavilion (4,228); Stanford, CA
02/02/2014; 1:00 pm, ESPN2	No. 4	at No. 21 California	W 79–64	21–1 (10–0)	Haas Pavilion (5,715); Berkeley, CA
02/07/2014; 6:00 pm, P12N	No. 3	at Washington State	W 77–69	22–1 (11–0)	Beasley Coliseum (1,015); Pullman, WA
02/09/2014; 12:30 pm, ESPNU	No. 3	at Washington	L 82–87	22–2 (11–1)	Alaska Airlines Arena (2,797); Seattle, WA
02/14/2014; 4:00 pm	No. 6	No. 15 Arizona State	W 61–35	23–2 (12–1)	Maples Pavilion (3,450); Stanford, CA
02/16/2014; Noon, P12N	No. 6	Arizona	W 74–48	24–2 (13–1)	Maples Pavilion (3,957); Stanford, CA
02/21/2014; 6:00 pm, P12N	No. 5	at USC	W 64–59	25–2 (14–1)	Galen Center (1,055); Los Angeles, CA
02/23/2014; 4:00 pm, P12N	No. 5	at UCLA	W 65–56	26–2 (15–1)	Pauley Pavilion (7,074); Los Angeles, CA
02/27/2014; 8:00 pm, P12N	No. 5	Washington	W 83–60	27–2 (16–1)	Maples Pavilion (3,132); Stanford, CA
03/01/2014; 7:30 pm, P12N	No. 5	Washington State	W 84–64	28–2 (17–1)	Maples Pavilion (5,628); Stanford, CA
2014 Pac-12 Conference women's tournament
03/07/2014; Noon, P12N	No. 4	vs. Colorado; Quarterfinals	W 69–54	29–2	KeyArena (N/A); Seattle, WA
03/08/2014; 6:00 pm, P12N	No. 4	vs. USC; Semifinals	L 68–72	29–3	KeyArena (N/A); Seattle, WA
NCAA women's tournament
03/22/2014*; 3:00 pm, ESPN2	No. 6	vs. South Dakota; First Round	W 81–62	30–3	Hilton Coliseum (6,579); Ames, IA
03/24/2014*; 3:30 pm, ESPN2	No. 6	vs. Florida State; Second Round	W 63–44	31–3	Hilton Coliseum (4,118); Ames, IA
03/30/2014*; 1:30 pm, ESPN2	No. 6	No. 14 Penn State; Sweet Sixteen	W 82–57	32–3	Maples Pavilion (N/A); Stanford, CA
04/01/2014*; 6:00 pm, ESPN	No. 6	No. 12 North Carolina; Elite Eight	W 74–65	33–3	Maples Pavilion (6,145); Stanford, CA
04/06/2014*; 6:00 pm, ESPN	No. 6	vs. No. 1 Connecticut; Final Four/Rivalry	L 56–75	33–4	Bridgestone Arena (17,548); Nashville, TN
*Non-conference game. ^{#}Rankings from AP Poll. (#) Tournament seedings in parentheses. All times are in Pacific Time.

== Rankings ==
Ranking movement Legend: ██ Increase in ranking. ██ Decrease in ranking. NR = Not ranked. RV = Received votes.
Poll	Pre	Wk 2	Wk 3	Wk 4	Wk 5	Wk 6	Wk 7	Wk 8	Wk 9	Wk 10	Wk 11	Wk 12	Wk 13	Wk 14	Wk 15	Wk 16	Wk 17	Wk 18	Wk 19	Final
AP	3	3	6	6	6	6	6	4	4	4	4	4	4	3	6	5	5	4	6	6
Coaches	3	5	5	5	4	4T	5	4	4	4	4	4	4	3	5	4	4	3	5	5

== See also ==
- 2013–14 Stanford Cardinal men's basketball team
