= 2013–14 Arizona Wildcats women's basketball team =

Intercollegiate basketball season

2013–14 Arizona Wildcats women's basketball
- Conference: Pac-12 Conference
- Record: 5–25 (1–17 Pac-12)
- Head coach: Niya Butts (6th year)
- Assistant coaches: E.C. Hill; Sean LeBeauf; Calamity McEntire
- Home arena: McKale Center

2013–14 Pac-12 Conference women's basketball standings
| | Conf. | | | | Overall |
| Team | W | | L | PCT | W | | L | PCT |
|---|---|---|---|---|---|---|---|---|
| No. 6 Stanford | 17 | – | 1 | .944 | 33 | – | 4 | .892 |
| No. 24 California | 13 | – | 5 | .722 | 22 | – | 10 | .688 |
| Oregon State | 13 | – | 5 | .722 | 24 | – | 11 | .686 |
| Arizona State | 11 | – | 7 | .611 | 23 | – | 10 | .697 |
| USC † | 11 | – | 7 | .611 | 22 | – | 13 | .629 |
| Washington | 10 | – | 8 | .556 | 20 | – | 14 | .588 |
| Washington State | 9 | – | 9 | .500 | 17 | – | 17 | .500 |
| UCLA | 7 | – | 11 | .389 | 13 | – | 18 | .419 |
| Colorado | 6 | – | 12 | .333 | 19 | – | 15 | .559 |
| Oregon | 6 | – | 12 | .333 | 16 | – | 16 | .500 |
| Utah | 4 | – | 14 | .222 | 12 | – | 19 | .387 |
| Arizona | 1 | – | 17 | .056 | 5 | – | 25 | .167 |
† 2014 Pac-12 Tournament winner As of 6 April 2014; Rankings from AP poll

The 2013–14 Arizona Wildcats women's basketball team represented the University of Arizona during the 2013–14 NCAA Division I women's basketball season. The Wildcats, led by sixth year head coach Niya Butts, played their games at the McKale Center and are members of the Pac-12 Conference. They finished with a record of 5–25 overall, 1–17 in Pac-12 play. They lost in the first round of the 2014 Pac-12 Conference women's basketball tournament to USC.

== Roster ==
| # | Name | Height | Position | Class | Hometown |
|---|---|---|---|---|---|
| 0 | Breanna Workman | 6'1" | F | Freshman | Las Vegas, NV |
| 1 | Candice Warthen | 5'5" | G | RS Junior | Warrenton, GA |
| 4 | Carissa Crutchfield | 5'8" | G | Senior | Fort Gibson, OK |
| 5 | Nyre Harris | 5'8" | G | Sophomore | Stockton, CA |
| 10 | Kama Griffitts | 6'0" | G/F | Senior | Coeur D'Alene, ID |
| 15 | Keyahndra Cannon | 5'9" | G | Sophomore | San Diego, CA |
| 20 | Farrin Bell | 6'0" | G | Sophomore | Richardson, TX |
| 23 | Erica Barnes | 6'2" | F | Senior | Sacramento, CA |
| 24 | LaBrittney Jones | 6'1" | F | Freshman | Cedar Hill, TX |
| 30 | Alli Gloyd | 6'1" | F | Senior | Phoenix, AZ |
| 31 | Dejza James | 6'1" | F | Freshman | Elk Grove, CA |
| 34 | Ashley Merrill | 6'1" | G | Freshman | Corona, CA |

== Schedule ==
| Date time, TV | Rank^{#} | Opponent^{#} | Result | Record | Site (attendance) city, state |
Exitbition
| 11/02/2013*; 3:00 pm | | Fort Lewis | W 80–65 | – | McKale Center (992); Tucson, AZ |
Regular season
| 11/08/2013*; 6:30 pm | | at Iona; Iona Tournament semifinals | L 75–82 ^{OT} | 0–1 | Hynes Athletic Center (482); New Rochelle, NY |
| 11/09/2013*; 1:00 pm | | vs. Michigan; Iona Tournament 3rd place game | L 71–73 ^{OT} | 0–2 | Hynes Athletic Center (N/A); New Rochelle, NY |
| 11/16/2013*; 2:00 pm | | at UC Santa Barbara | W 51–49 | 1–2 | The Thunderdome (562); Santa Barbara, CA |
| 11/20/2013*; 7:00 pm | | Stephen F. Austin | L 56–60 | 1–3 | McKale Center (1,057); Tucson, AZ |
| 11/23/2013*; 5:00 pm | | at Pacific | L 66–75 | 1–4 | Alex G. Spanos Center (722); Stockton, CA |
| 11/26/2013*; 11:00 am | | Wake Forest | L 58–70 | 1–5 | McKale Center (4,487); Tucson, AZ |
| 11/30/2013*; 2:00 pm, BYUtv | | at BYU | L 56–64 | 1–6 | Marriott Center (576); Provo, UT |
| 12/05/2013*; 6:00 pm | | at UAB | L 53–63 | 1–7 | Bartow Arena (363); Birmingham, AL |
| 12/15/2013*; 12:00 pm, P12N | | Texas Tech | W 65–56 | 2–7 | McKale Center (1,294); Tucson, AZ |
| 12/21/2013*; 6:00 pm | | UC Riverside | W 75–59 | 3–7 | McKale Center (1,112); Tucson, AZ |
| 12/29/2013*; 1:00 pm | | Arkansas–Pine Bluff | W 65–56 | 4–7 | McKale Center (1,294); Corvallis, OR |
| 01/03/2014; 8:00 pm | | at Washington | L 52–55 | 4–8 (0–1) | Alaska Airlines Arena (1,626); Seattle, WA |
| 01/05/2014; 1:00 pm, P12N | | at Washington State | L 59–61 | 4–9 (0–2) | Beasley Coliseum (621); Pullman, WA |
| 01/10/2014; 8:00 pm, P12N | | UCLA | L 61–67 | 4–10 (0–3) | McKale Center (3,106); Tucson, AZ |
| 01/12/2014; 2:00 pm | | USC | L 45–54 | 4–11 (0–4) | McKale Center (N/A); Tucson, AZ |
| 01/17/2014; 7:00 pm, P12N | | No. 4 Stanford | L 52–96 | 4–12 (0–5) | McKale Center (1,169); Tucson, AZ |
| 01/20/2014; 3:00 pm, P12N | | California | L 64–79 | 4–13 (0–6) | McKale Center (1,154); Tucson, AZ |
| 01/24/2014; 7:00 pm | | at Colorado | L 47–68 | 4–14 (0–7) | Coors Events Center (2,914); Boulder, CO |
| 01/26/2014; 3:00 pm | | at Utah | L 57–60 | 4–15 (0–8) | Jon M. Huntsman Center (913); Salt Lake City, UT |
| 01/31/2014; 7:00 pm | | Oregon | L 72–84 | 4–16 (0–9) | McKale Center (1,321); Tucson, AZ |
| 02/02/2014; 12:00 pm, P12N | | Oregon State | L 50–64 | 4–17 (0–10) | McKale Center (983); Tucson, AZ |
| 02/04/2014; 7:30 pm, P12N | | at No. 11 Arizona State; Territorial Cup | L 36–60 | 4–18 (0–11) | Wells Fargo Arena (2,478); Tempe, AZ |
| 02/09/2014; 1:00 pm, P12N | | No. 11 Arizona State; Territorial Cup | W 68–49 | 5–18 (1–11) | McKale Center (N/A); Tucson, AZ |
| 02/14/2014; 8:30 pm, P12N | | at No. 22 California | L 49–65 | 5–19 (1–12) | Haas Pavilion (1,390); Berkeley, CA |
| 02/16/2014; 1:00 pm, P12N | | at No. 6 Stanford | L 48–74 | 5–20 (1–13) | Maples Pavilion (3,957); Stanford, CA |
| 02/21/2014; 7:00 pm | | Utah | L 47–52 | 5–21 (1–14) | McKale Center (1,186); Tucson, AZ |
| 02/23/2014; 3:00 pm, P12N | | Colorado | L 56–61 ^{OT} | 5–22 (1–15) | McKale Center (1,253); Tucson, AZ |
| 02/28/2014; 8:00 pm | | at Oregon State | L 48–78 | 5–23 (1–16) | Gill Coliseum (4,631); Corvallis, OR |
| 03/02/2014; 2:00 pm, P12N | | at Oregon | L 78–90 | 5–24 (1–17) | Matthew Knight Arena (1,208); Eugene, OR |
2014 Pac-12 Tournament
| 03/06/2014; 3:30 pm, P12N | | vs. USC; First Round | L 54–59 | 5–25 | KeyArena (2,449); Seattle, WA |
*Non-conference game. ^{#}Rankings from AP Poll. (#) Tournament seedings in parentheses. All times are in Mountain Time.

== See also ==
- 2013–14 Arizona Wildcats men's basketball team
