= 2013–14 Oregon Ducks women's basketball team =

Intercollegiate basketball season

2013–14 Oregon Ducks women's basketball

WNIT, Second Round
- Conference: Pac-12 Conference
- Record: 16–16 (6–12 Pac-12)
- Head coach: Paul Westhead
- Assistant coaches: Shandrika Lee; Dan Muscatell; Bianca Ziemann
- Home arena: Matthew Knight Arena

2013–14 Pac-12 Conference women's basketball standings
	Conf.				Overall
Team	W		L	PCT	W		L	PCT
No. 6 Stanford	17	–	1	.944	33	–	4	.892
No. 24 California	13	–	5	.722	22	–	10	.688
Oregon State	13	–	5	.722	24	–	11	.686
Arizona State	11	–	7	.611	23	–	10	.697
USC †	11	–	7	.611	22	–	13	.629
Washington	10	–	8	.556	20	–	14	.588
Washington State	9	–	9	.500	17	–	17	.500
UCLA	7	–	11	.389	13	–	18	.419
Colorado	6	–	12	.333	19	–	15	.559
Oregon	6	–	12	.333	16	–	16	.500
Utah	4	–	14	.222	12	–	19	.387
Arizona	1	–	17	.056	5	–	25	.167
† 2014 Pac-12 Tournament winner As of 6 April 2014; Rankings from AP poll

The 2013–14 Oregon Ducks women's basketball team represented the University of Oregon during the 2013–14 NCAA Division I women's basketball season. The Ducks, led by fifth year head coach Paul Westhead, played their games at the Matthew Knight Arena and were members of the Pac-12 Conference. They finished with a record of 16–16 overall, 6–12 in Pac-12 play for a tie for a ninth-place finish. They lost in the first round of the 2014 Pac-12 Conference women's basketball tournament to Washington State. They were invited to the 2014 Women's National Invitation Tournament, where they defeated Pacific in the first round before losing to Washington in the second round.

== Roster ==
#	Name	Height	Position	Class	Hometown
1	Drea Toler	5'5"	G	Freshman	Los Angeles, CA
2	Danielle Love	6'2"	F	Senior	Everett, WA
3	Laura Stanulis	5'9"	G	RS Senior	Portland, OR
5	Jordan Loera	5'9"	G	Junior	Moses Lake, WA
12	Amanda Delgado	5'7"	G	Junior	Las Vegas, NV
14	Jillian Alleyne	6'3"	F	Sophomore	Fontana, CA
15	Liz Brenner	6'1"	F	Junior	Portland, OR
21	Chrishae Rowe	5'10"	G	Freshman	Corona, CA
22	Ariel Thomas	5'6"	G	Senior	Sacramento, CA
23	Chloe Stiles	5'8"	G	Sophomore	Eugene, OR
31	Katelyn Loper	5'11"	G	RS Junior	Post Falls, ID
32	Janitah Iamaleava	6'2"	C	Sophomore	Long Beach, CA
33	Lexi Petersen	5'11"	G	RS Sophomore	Tukwila, WA
34	Chynna Miley	6'2"	F	Senior	Atlanta, GA
40	Megan Carpenter	6'4"	C	Junior	Longmont, CO
51	Katie Gruys	6'0"	F	Sophomore	Maple Lake, MN

== Schedule ==
Date time, TV	Rank^{#}	Opponent^{#}	Result	Record	Site (attendance) city, state
Regular season
11/09/2013*; 7:00 pm		Cal State Bakersfield	W 131–91	1–0	Matthew Knight Arena (1,026); Eugene, OR
11/12/2013*; 7:00 pm		Portland	W 113–86	2–0	Matthew Knight Arena (1,295); Eugene, OR
11/17/2013*; 2:00 pm		Sacramento State	L 85–97	2–1	Matthew Knight Arena (1,188); Eugene, OR
11/20/2013*; 4:00 pm		at No. 1 Connecticut	L 68–114	2–2	XL Center (7,961); Hartford, CT
11/25/2013*; 7:00 pm		Pepperdine	W 83–80	3–2	Matthew Knight Arena (969); Eugene, OR
12/01/2013*; 12:00 pm		Princeton	W 110–90	4–2	Matthew Knight Arena (998); Eugene, OR
12/04/2013*; 6:00 pm		at Seattle	W 105–100	5–2	KeyArena (648); Seattle, WA
12/14/2013*; 2:00 pm		Portland State	W 113–78	6–2	Matthew Knight Arena (1,041); Eugene, OR
12/18/2013*; 7:00 pm		Southern	W 130–90	7–2	Matthew Knight Arena (917); Eugene, OR
12/20/2013*; 7:00 pm		Cal Poly	W 124–87	8–2	Matthew Knight Arena (964); Eugene, OR
12/29/2013*; 7:00 pm		Cal State Northridge	W 96–61	9–2	Matthew Knight Arena (1,121); Eugene, OR
01/03/2014; 6:00 pm, P12N		at No. 4 Stanford	L 66–96	9–3 (0–1)	Maples Pavilion (3,495); Stanford, CA
01/05/2014; 12:00 pm, P12N		at No. 23 California	L 98–101 ^{OT}	9–4 (0–2)	Haas Pavilion (2,071); Berkeley, CA
01/11/2014; 5:00 pm, P12N		Oregon State; Civil War	L 80–88	9–5 (0–3)	Matthew Knight Arena (1,591); Eugene, OR
01/13/2014; 7:00 pm, P12N		at Oregon State; Civil War	L 70–84	9–6 (0–4)	Gill Coliseum (1,625); Corvallis, OR
01/17/2014; 5:00 pm, P12N		at UCLA	L 63–88	9–7 (0–5)	Pauley Pavilion (2,575); Los Angeles, CA
01/19/2014; 2:00 pm, P12N		at USC	L 85–109	9–8 (0–6)	Galen Center (1,020); Los Angeles, CA
01/24/2014; 7:00 pm		Washington State	W 82–66	10–8 (1–6)	Matthew Knight Arena (1,146); Eugene, OR
01/26/2014; 12:00 pm, P12N		Washington	W 101–85	11–8 (2–6)	Matthew Knight Arena (1,564); Eugene, OR
01/31/2014; 6:00 pm		at Arizona	W 84–72	12–8 (3–6)	McKale Center (1,321); Tucson, AZ
02/02/2014; 12:00 pm		at No. 15 Arizona State	L 94–97	12–9 (3–7)	Wells Fargo Arena (1,340); Tempe, AZ
02/08/2014; 2:00 pm		Utah	W 93–71	13–9 (4–7)	Matthew Knight Arena (384); Eugene, OR
02/10/2014; 5:00 pm		Colorado	L 75–81	13–10 (4–8)	Matthew Knight Arena (947); Eugene, OR
02/14/2014; 7:30 pm, P12N		USC	L 78–88	13–11 (4–9)	Matthew Knight Arena (994); Eugene, OR
02/17/2014; 4:00 pm, P12N		UCLA	L 83–103	13–12 (4–10)	Matthew Knight Arena (965); Eugene, OR
02/21/2014; 6:00 pm, P12N		at Washington	L 100–108	13–13 (4–11)	Alaska Airlines Arena (1,903); Seattle, WA
02/23/2014; 1:00 pm		at Washington State	L 88–108	13–14 (4–12)	Beasley Coliseum (752); Pullman, WA
02/28/2014; 7:00 pm		No. 20 Arizona State	W 98–90	14–14 (5–12)	Matthew Knight Arena (1,122); Eugene, OR
03/02/2014; 1:00 pm, P12N		Arizona	W 90–78	15–14 (6–12)	Matthew Knight Arena (1,208); Eugene, OR
2014 Pac-12 Tournament
03/06/2014; 6:00 pm, P12N		vs. Washington State; First Round	L 100–107	15–15	KeyArena (N/A); Seattle, WA
WNIT
03/20/2014*; 7:00 pm		Pacific; First Round	W 90–63	16–15	Matthew Knight Arena (596); Eugene, OR
03/24/2014*; 7:00 pm		Washington; Second Round	L 85–93	16–16	Matthew Knight Arena (733); Eugene, OR
*Non-conference game. ^{#}Rankings from AP Poll. (#) Tournament seedings in parentheses. All times are in Pacific Time.

== See also ==
- 2013–14 Oregon Ducks men's basketball team
