= 2013–14 Portland Pilots women's basketball team =

Intercollegiate basketball season

2013–14 Portland Pilots women's basketball
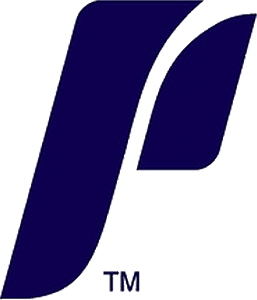
- Conference: West Coast Conference
- Record: 14–16 (7–11 WCC)
- Head coach: Jim Sollars (27th season)
- Assistant coaches: Sean Kelly; Cheryl Sorenson; Jazmine Foreman
- Home arena: Chiles Center

2013–14 West Coast Conference women's basketball standings
	Conf.				Overall
Team	W		L	PCT	W		L	PCT
No. 18 Gonzaga†	16	–	2	.889	29	–	5	.853
BYU	14	–	4	.778	28	–	7	.800
Pacific	12	–	6	.667	18	–	13	.581
Saint Mary's	11	–	7	.611	23	–	10	.697
San Diego	11	–	7	.611	24	–	9	.727
Portland	7	–	11	.389	14	–	16	.467
Santa Clara	6	–	12	.333	10	–	20	.333
San Francisco	6	–	12	.333	12	–	19	.387
Loyola Marymount	6	–	12	.333	9	–	21	.300
Pepperdine	1	–	17	.056	6	–	25	.194
† 2014 WCC tournament winner As of March 29, 2014; Rankings from AP Poll

The 2013–14 Portland Pilots women's basketball team represented the University of Portland in the 2013–14 college basketball season. It was head coach Jim Sollars' twenty-seventh and final season at Portland. The Pilots were members of the West Coast Conference and played their home games at the Chiles Center.

== Before the season ==
Pre-season Predictions will be announced at the 2013 WCC Media Day sometime in October.

== Roster ==
2013–14 Portland Pilots women's basketball team
Players
Coaches

Pos.	#	Name	Height	Year	Previous school	Hometown
G	3	Kaylie Van Loo	5 ft 9 in (1.75 m)	Fr	Glencoe	Hillsboro, OR
G	10	Colleen Olinger	5 ft 8 in (1.73 m)	Jr	Academy of Notre Dame de Namur	Springfield, PA
F	11	Sara Ines Hernandez	6 ft 1 in (1.85 m)	So	Liceo Scientifico Nomentano	Rome, Italy
G	14	Allison Ryan	5 ft 10 in (1.78 m)	RS Fr	Ponderosa	Cameron Park, CA
G	15	Alexis Byrd	5 ft 10 in (1.78 m)	Sr	Centennial	Las Vegas, NV
G	20	Hannah Mattson	5 ft 9 in (1.75 m)	Fr	West Valley	Fairbanks, AK
G/F	22	Cassandra Brown	6 ft 2 in (1.88 m)	RS Jr	Clarence Fulton	Vernon, B. C.
G	23	Kari Luttinen	5 ft 10 in (1.78 m)	Jr	Seattle Prep	Seattle, WA
G	24	Stefania Sideri	5 ft 9 in (1.75 m)	Fr	Ano Liosia	Athens, Greece
F	30	Cassandra Thompson	6 ft 2 in (1.88 m)	Jr	Timberlake	Athol, ID
G	32	Jasmine Wooton	5 ft 8 in (1.73 m)	Jr	Chatsworth	Northridge, CA
F	33	Amy Pupa	6 ft 1 in (1.85 m)	Sr	Ventura	Ventura, CA
C	35	Elyse Snyder	6 ft 3 in (1.91 m)	RS Jr	Patriot	Riverside, CA
C	40	Erin Boettcher	6 ft 3 in (1.91 m)	RS Jr	Carondelet; New Mexico	Concord, CA
G	42	Jazmyn Johnson	5 ft 9 in (1.75 m)	So	Kingwood Park	Kingwood, TX

Head coach

- Jim Sollars (Centralia)

Assistant coach(es)

- Sean Kelly (Pacific Lutheran)
- Cheryl Sorenson (Washington)
- Jazmine Foreman (BYU)

Legend

- (C) Team captain
- (S) Suspended
- (I) Ineligible
- (W) Walk-on
- Injured
- Current redshirt

Roster

== Schedule and results ==
Date time, TV	Rank^{#}	Opponent^{#}	Result	Record	Site city, state
Exhibition
10/29/2013*; 7:00 pm		Concordia-Portland	W 81–47	-	Chiles Center; Portland, OR
Regular Season
11/08/2013*; 5:15 pm		Eastern Washington	W 68–65	1–0	Chiles Center; Portland, OR
11/12/2013*; 7:00 pm		at Oregon	L 86–113	1–1	Matthew Knight Arena; Eugene, OR
11/15/2013*; 2:00 pm		at Washington	W 91–77	2–1	Hec Edmundson Pavilion; Seattle, WA
11/18/2013*; 6:00 pm, Watch Big Sky		at Montana	L 61–68	2–2	Dahlberg Arena; Missoula, MT
11/24/2013*; 4:00 pm		Seattle	W 70–63	3–2	Chiles Center; Portland, OR
11/29/2013*; 7:00 pm		Columbia	W 58–42	4–2	Chiles Center; Portland, OR
12/06/2013*; 7:00 pm		Oregon State	L 73–79	4–3	Chiles Center; Portland, OR
12/08/2013*; 2:00 pm		Boise State	W 85–71	5–3	Chiles Center; Portland, OR
12/14/2013*; 2:00 pm, MW Net		at Fresno State	L 67–76	5–4	Save Mart Center; Fresno, CA
12/18/2013*; 7:00 pm		Cal Poly	W 83–76	6–4	Chiles Center; Portland, OR
12/21/2013*; 2:00 pm, Watch Big Sky		at Portland State	W 76–49	7–4	Peter Stott Center; Portland, OR
12/28/2013; 2:00 pm		at Pacific	W 73–65	8–4 (1–0)	Alex G. Spanos Center; Stockton, CA
12/30/2013; 6:00 pm		at Saint Mary's	L 65–80	8–5 (1–1)	McKeon Pavilion; Moraga, CA
01/03/2014; 7:00 pm		Gonzaga	L 24–56	8–6 (1–2)	Chiles Center; Portland, OR
01/08/2014; 7:00 pm		San Diego	W 72–51	9–6 (2–2)	Chiles Center; Portland, OR
01/11/2014; 2:00 pm		BYU	L 68–75	9–7 (2–3)	Chiles Center; Portland, OR
01/17/2014; 7:00 pm		at Santa Clara	L 62–69	9–8 (2–4)	Leavey Center; Santa Clara, CA
01/19/2014; 2:00 pm		at San Francisco	W 82–73	10–8 (3–4)	War Memorial Gymnasium; San Francisco, CA
01/23/2014; 7:00 pm, TV-32		at Pepperdine	W 53–43	11–8 (4–4)	Firestone Fieldhouse; Malibu, CA
01/25/2014; 2:00 pm		at Loyola Marymount	L 64–78	11–9 (4–5)	Gersten Pavilion; Los Angeles, CA
01/30/2014; 7:00 pm		San Francisco	L 73–74	11–10 (4–6)	Chiles Center; Portland, OR
02/01/2014; 1:00 pm		Santa Clara	W 75–55	12–10 (5–6)	Chiles Center; Portland, OR
02/06/2014; 7:00 pm		Loyola Marymount	W 84–66	13–10 (6–6)	Chiles Center; Portland, OR
02/08/2014; 2:00 pm		Pepperdine	W 78–59	14–10 (7–6)	Chiles Center; Portland, OR
02/13/2014; 6:00 pm, BYUtv		at BYU	L 43–67	14–11 (7–7)	Marriott Center; Provo, UT
02/15/2014; 2:00 pm		at San Diego	L 52–59	14–12 (7–8)	Jenny Craig Pavilion; San Diego, CA
02/22/2014; 2:00 pm		at No. 24 Gonzaga	L 61–72	14–13 (7–9)	McCarthey Athletic Center; Spokane, WA
02/27/2014; 7:00 pm		Pacific	L 57–70	14–14 (7–10)	Chiles Center; Portland, OR
03/01/2014; 1:00 pm		Saint Mary's	L 72–76	14–15 (7–11)	Chiles Center; Portland, OR
2014 West Coast Conference women's basketball tournament
03/07/2014; 12:00 pm, BYUtv		vs. Pacific; Quarterfinals	L 72–84	14–16	Orleans Arena; Las Vegas, NV
*Non-conference game. ^{#}Rankings from AP Poll. (#) Tournament seedings in parentheses. All times are in Pacific Time.

== Game summaries ==
=== Exhibition: Concordia ===
Oct 29
7:05 pm PDT

Recap

Concordia Cavaliers 47, Portland Pilots 81
Scoring by half: 25-44, 22-37
Pts: Lexi Campbell 16; Rebs: Caitlyn McCutcheon 7 Asts: Gabi Beyer 3	Pts: Cassandra Brown 19; Rebs: Erin Boettcher 12; Asts: Colleen Olinger, Jasmine Wooton, & Amy Pupa 3

Chiles Center
Portland, OR
Attendance: 272
Referees: Penny Davis, Janetta Graham, Karen Lasuik

=== Eastern Washington ===
Nov 8
5:15 pm PST

Recap

Eastern Washington Eagles 65, Portland Pilots 68
Scoring by half: 30-29, 35-39
Pts: Laura Hughes 17; Rebs: Lexie Nelson & Laura Hughes 5 Asts: Aubrey Ashenfelter & Jade Redmon 5	Pts: Cassandra Brown 17; Rebs: Cassandra Thompson 12; Asts: Alexis Byrd 4

Chiles Center
Portland, OR
Attendance: 302
Referees: Rick Showers, Paul Patterson, Skelly Wingard

=== Oregon ===
Nov 12
7:05 pm PST

Recap

Portland Pilots 86, Oregon Ducks 113
Scoring by half: 36-54, 50-59
Pts: Alexis Byrd 23; Rebs: Cassandra Thompson 13; Asts: Amy Pupa & Jasmine Wooton 5	Pts: Jillian Alleyne 25; Rebs: Ariel Thomas 5 Asts: Ariel Thomas 3

Matthew Knight Arena
Eugene, OR
Attendance: 1,295
Referees: Cathi Cornell, Brian Woods, Bart Baldwin

=== Washington ===
Nov 15
12:00 pm PST

Recap

Portland Pilots 91, Washington Huskies 77
Scoring by half: 39-33, 52-44
Pts: Cassandra Brown 28; Rebs: Cassandra Brown 12; Asts: Jasmine Wooton 6	Pts: Kelsey Plum 22; Rebs: Aminah Williams 12; Asts: Jazmine Davis 4

Hec Edmundson Pavilion
Seattle, WA
Attendance: 1,376
Referees: Shelley Russi, Karen Lasuik, Bart Baldwin

=== Montana ===
Nov 18
6:00 pm PST

Recap

Portland Pilots 61, Montana Lady Griz 68
Scoring by half: 21-22, 40-46
Pts: Jasmine Wooton 20; Rebs: Amy Pupa 9 Asts: Alexis Byrd 3	Pts: Torry Hill & Kellie Cole 16; Rebs: Kellie Cole 9 Asts: Kellie Cole 3

Dahlberg Arena
Missoula, MT
Attendance: 2,666
Referees: In'Fini Robinson, Michol Murray, Robert Scofield

=== Seattle ===
Nov 24
4:00 pm PST

Recap

Seattle Redhawks 63, Portland Pilots 70
Scoring by half: 31-29, 32-41
Pts: Taelor Ross 13; Rebs: Kacie Sowell 17; Asts: Sylvia Shephard & Taelor Ross 5	Pts: Cassandra Brown 18; Rebs: Amy Pupa 16; Asts: Jasmine Wooton 6

Chiles Center
Portland, OR
Attendance: 318
Referees: Brenda Pantoja, Wanda Szeremeta, Rigo Vasquez

=== Columbia ===
Series History: First Meeting

Nov 29
7:00 pm PST

Recap

Columbia Lions 42, Portland Pilots 58
Scoring by half: 16-30, 26-28
Pts: Taylor Ward 14; Rebs: Taylor Ward, Tori Oliver, & Amara Mbionwu 7 Asts: Taylor Ward 3	Pts: Kari Luttinen 20; Rebs: Cassandra Thompson 11; Asts: Jasmine Wooton 4

Chiles Center
Portland, OR
Attendance: 223
Referees: Cathi Cornell, Steve Belnap, Bart Baldwin

=== Oregon State ===
Series History: Oregon State leads 16-4

Dec 6
7:00 pm PST

Recap

Oregon State Beavers 79, Portland Pilots 73
Scoring by half: 22-32, 57-41
Pts: Jamie Weisner 22; Rebs: Samantha Siegner 9 Asts: Ali Gibson, Jamie Weisner, Sydney Weise, & Deven Hunter 2	Pts: Kari Luttinen 21; Rebs: Cassandra Thompson 7 Asts: Alexis Byrd 6

Chiles Center
Portland, OR
Attendance: 402
Referees: Charles Gonzales, Darren Krzesnik, Lucy Banuelos

=== Boise State ===
Series History: Portland leads 11-5

Dec 8
2:00 pm PST

Recap

Boise State Broncos 71, Portland Pilots 85
Scoring by half: 31-44, 40-41
Pts: Miquelle Askew 21; Rebs: Miquelle Askew & Kayla Reinhart 7 Asts: Kayla Reinhart & Brooke Pahukoa 3	Pts: Cassandra Brown & Kari Luttinen 25; Rebs: Amy Pupa & Alexis Byrd 8 Asts: Alexis Byrd 6

Chiles Center
Portland, OR
Attendance: 371
Referees: Robert Scofield, Penny Davis, Julie Vanni

=== Fresno State ===
Series History: Portland leads 1-0

MW Net

Dec 14
2:00 pm PST

Recap

Portland Pilots 67, Fresno State Bulldogs 76
Scoring by half: 29-41, 38-35
Pts: Kari Luttinen & Jasmine Wooton 17; Rebs: Cassandra Thompson 9 Asts: Jasmine Wooton 5	Pts: Moriah Faulk 27; Rebs: Moriah Faulk 9 Asts: Taylor Thompson 8

Save Mart Center
Fresno, CA
Attendance: 2,183
Referees: Melissa Barlow, Roy Gulbeyan, Michol Murray

=== Cal Poly ===
Series History: Cal Poly leads 4-1

Dec 18
7:00 pm PST

Recap

Cal Poly Mustangs 76, Portland Pilots 83
Scoring by half: 40-44, 36-39
Pts: Molly Schlemer 24; Rebs: Molly Schlemer 16; Asts: Jonae Ervin 5	Pts: Cassandra Brown 21; Rebs: Amy Pupa 9 Asts: Alexis Byrd & Jasmine Wooton 4

Chiles Center
Portland, OR
Attendance: 250
Referees: Kyle Bacon, Alecia Murray, Rido Vasquez

=== Portland State ===
Series History: Portland leads 25-24

Watch Big Sky

Dec 21
2:00 pm PST

Recap

Portland Pilots 76, Portland State Vikings 49
Scoring by half: 31-24, 45-25
Pts: Cassandra Brown 24; Rebs: Amy Pupa 9 Asts: Kari Luttinen 6	Pts: Lariel Powell 11; Rebs: Emily Easom & Allie Brock 7 Asts: Kate Lanz 3

Stott Center
Portland, OR
Attendance: 484
Referees: Steve Belnap, Kaili Kimura, Tiffany Jump

=== Pacific ===
Series History: Portland leads 6-2

Dec 28
2:00 pm PST

Recap

Portland Pilots 73, Pacific Tigers 65
Scoring by half: 39-30, 34-35
Pts: Jasmine Wooton 36; Rebs: Cassandra Brown 12; Asts: Amy Pupa 6	Pts: Kendall Kenyon 22; Rebs: Kendall Kenyon 21; Asts: Kiki Moore 7

Alex G. Spanos Center
Stockton, CA
Attendance: 490
Referees: Brenda Pantoja, Michol Murray, In'Fini Robinson

=== Saint Mary's ===
Series History: Saint Mary's leads 36-20

Dec 30
6:00 pm PST

Recap

Portland Pilots 65, Saint Mary's Gaels 80
Scoring by half: 34-33, 31-47
Pts: Cassandra Brown 25; Rebs: Cassandra Brown 5 Asts: Alexis Byrs & Jasmine Wooton 4	Pts: Kate Gaze 20; Rebs: Danielle Mauldin 11; Asts: Shannon Mauldin 4

McKeon Pavilion
Moraga, CA
Attendance: 346
Referees: Michelle Russi, Bart Baldwin, Gordon Torigoe

=== Gonzaga ===
Series History: Gonzaga leads 40-27

Jan 3
7:00 pm PST

Recap

Gonzaga Bulldogs 56, Portland Pilots 24
Scoring by half: 39-30, 34-35
Pts: Haiden Palmer 13; Rebs: Stephanie Golden 7 Asts: Danielle Walter 5	Pts: Alexis Byrd & Jasmie Wooton 8 Rebs: Cassandra Thompson 9 Asts: Jasmie Wooton 2

Chiles Center
Portland, OR
Attendance: 670
Referees: Karen Lasuik, Brian Woods, Alex Carroll

=== San Diego ===
Series History: San Diego leads 32-31

Pilots TV

Jan 8
7:00 pm PST

Recap

San Diego Toreros 51, Portland Pilots 72
Scoring by half: 24-31, 27-41
Pts: Felicia Wijenberg 28; Rebs: Sophia Ederaine 13; Asts: Amy Kame 6	Pts: Cassandra Brown 18; Rebs: Amy Pupa 11; Asts: Jasmine Wooton 6

Chiles Center
Portland, OR
Attendance: 262
Referees: Charles Gonzales, Alejandro Moreno, Julie Vanni

=== BYU ===
Series History: BYU leads series 12-4

Jan 11
2:00 pm PST

Recap

BYU Cougars 75, Portland Pilots 68
Scoring by half: 43-29, 32-39
Pts: Jennifer Hamson 21; Rebs: Jennifer Hamson 11; Asts: Kylie Maeda 7	Pts: Cassandra Thompson 19; Rebs: Amy Pupa 9 Asts: Jasmine Wooton & Amy Pupa 3

Chiles Center
Portland, OR
Attendance: 401
Referees: Anita Ortega, Bart Baldwin, Cheryl Blue

=== Santa Clara ===
Series History: Santa Clara leads 34-29

Jan 17
7:00 pm PST

Recap

Portland Pilots 62, Santa Clara Broncos 69
Scoring by half: 13-40, 49-29
Pts: Amy Pupa 16; Rebs: Amy Pupa 10; Asts: Kari Luttinen 4	Pts: Nici Gilday 19; Rebs: Jo Paine 7 Asts: Raquel Avila 7

Leavey Center
Santa Clara, CA
Attendance: 243
Referees: Anita Ortega, Janetta Graham, Rigo Vasquez

=== San Francisco ===
Series History: Portland leads 30-26

Jan 19
2:00 pm PST

Recap

Portland Pilots 82, San Francisco Dons 72
Scoring by half: 32-32, 50-40
Pts: Kari Luttinen 23; Rebs: Amy Pupa 9 Asts: Jasmine Wooton 4	Pts: Taylor Proctor 21; Rebs: Taylor Proctor 11; Asts: Taylor Proctor, Taj Winston, & Alexa Hardick 3

War Memorial Gymnasium
San Francisco, CA
Attendance: 187
Referees: Kyle Bacon, Tiffany Jump, Richard Waters

=== Pepperdine ===
Series History: Pepperdine leads series 34-22
Broadcaster: Josh Perigo

TV-32

Jan 23
7:05 pm PST

Recap

Portland Pilots 53, Pepperdine Waves 43
Scoring by half: 22-22, 31-21
Pts: Cassandra Thompson 15; Rebs: Amy Pupa 11; Asts: Jasmine Wooton & Amy Pupa 5	Pts: Tessa Emerson 14; Rebs: Grace Lee Baughn & Ea Shoushtari 8 Asts: Ea Shoushtari 4

Firestone Fieldhouse
Malibu, CA
Attendance: 237
Referees: Lisa Jones, Robert Scofield, Bart Baldwin

=== Loyola Marymount ===
Series History: Loyola Marymount leads 34-22

Jan 25
2:00 pm PST

Recap

Portland Pilots 64, Loyola Marymount Lions 78
Scoring by half: 21-33, 43-45
Pts: Jasmine Wooton 14; Rebs: Jasmine Wooton 7 Asts: Jasmine Wooton 3	Pts: Deanna Johnson 20; Rebs: Emily Ben-Jumbo 13; Asts: Hazel Ramirez 11

Gersten Pavilion
Los Angeles, CA
Attendance: 457
Referees: Rick Showers, Bethany Graves, Cheryl Flores

=== San Francisco ===
Series History: Portland leads 31-26

Jan 30
7:00 pm PST

Recap

San Francisco Dons 74, Portland Pilots 73
Scoring by half: 24-37, 50-36
Pts: Alexa Hardick 21; Rebs: Taylor Proctor 9 Asts: Taylor Proctor 6	Pts: Cassandra Thompson 23; Rebs: Amy Pupa 10; Asts: Jasmine Wooton 6

Chiles Center
Portland, OR
Attendance: 325
Referees: Wanda Szermeta, Lisa Ulmer, Felicity Willis

=== Santa Clara ===
Series History: Santa Clara leads 35-29

Feb 1
1:00 pm PST

Santa Clara Broncos 55, Portland Pilots 75
Scoring by half: 29-37, 26-38
Pts: Nici Gilday 16; Rebs: Jo Paine 7 Asts: Jo Paine 4	Pts: Kari Luttinen 23; Rebs: Cassandra Thompson 7 Asts: Jasmine Wooton & Amy Pupa 4

Chiles Center
Portland, OR
Attendance:
Referees: Penny Davis, Renee Robinson, In'Fini Robinson

=== Loyola Marymount ===
Series History: Loyola Marymount leads 35-22

Feb 6
2:00 pm PST

Recap

Loyola Marymount Lions 66, Portland Pilots 84
Scoring by half: 33-41, 33-43
Pts: Hazel Ramirez 21; Rebs: Mackenzie Kerins 25; Asts: Hazel Ramirez 6	Pts: Jasmine Wooton 21; Rebs: Cassandra Thompson 8 Asts: Jasmine Wooton & Amu Pupa 5

Chiles Center
Portland, OR
Attendance: 241
Referees: Shelley Russi, Richard Waters, Tiffany Bird

=== Pepperdine ===
Series History: Pepperdine leads series 34-23

Feb 8
2:00 pm PST

Recap

Pepperdine Waves 59, Portland Pilots 78
Scoring by half: 19-43, 40-35
Pts: Allie Green 19; Rebs: Ea Shoushtari & Allie Green 8 Asts: Allie Green 2	Pts: Cassandra Thompson & Jasmine Wooton 17; Rebs: Cassandra Brown & Amy Pupa 8 Asts: Jasmine Wooton 8

Chiles Center
Portland, OR
Attendance: 242
Referees: Darren Krzesnik, Bethany Graves, Teresa Turner

=== BYU ===
Series History: BYU leads series 13-4
Broadcasters: Spencer Linton, Kristen Kozlowski & Jake Edmonds

BYUtv

Feb 13
7:05 pm MST

Recap

Portland Pilots 43, BYU Cougars 67
Scoring by half: 23-26, 20-41
Pts: Jasmine Wooton 11; Rebs: Amy Pupa 10; Asts: Jasmine Wooton 4	Pts: Jennifer Hamson 27; Rebs: Jennifer Hamson 13; Asts: Kim Beeston 5

Marriott Center
Provo, UT
Attendance: 695
Referees: Karen Lasuik, Michol Murray, Brian Woods

=== San Diego ===
Series History: Series even 32-32

Feb 15
2:08 pm PST

Recap

Portland Pilots 52, San Diego Toreros 59
Scoring by half: 21-30, 31-29
Pts: Cassandra Brown & Amy Pupa 17; Rebs: Amy Pupa 7 Asts: Jasmine Wooton 4	Pts: Amy Kame 22; Rebs: Amy Kame 9 Asts: Amy Kame 7

Jenny Craig Pavilion
San Diego, CA
Attendance: 1,236
Referees: Rick Showers, Tiffany Jump, Benny Luna

=== Portland ===
Series History: Gonzaga leads 41-27

Feb 22
2:00 pm PST

Recap

Portland Pilots 61, Gonzaga Bulldogs 72
Scoring by half: 21-31, 40-41
Pts: Cassandra Brown 16; Rebs: Amy Pupa 6 Asts: Jasmine Wooton 7	Pts: Haiden Palmer 12; Rebs: Kiara Kudron 8 Asts: Keani Albanez 5

McCarthey Athletic Center
Spokane, WA
Attendance: 6,000
Referees: Wanda Szeremeta, Richard Waters, Ifeyinwa Seales

=== Pacific ===
Series History: Portland leads 7-2

Feb 27
7:00 pm PST

Recap

Pacific Tigers 70, Portland Pilots 57
Scoring by half: 33-17, 37-40
Pts: Kendall Kenyon 17; Rebs: Kiki Moore 14; Asts: Madison Parrish & Sam Pettinger 6	Pts: Kari Luttinen 13; Rebs: Cassandra Thompson 7 Asts: Jasmine Wooton & Amy Pupa 3

Chiles Center
Portland, OR
Attendance: 366
Referees: Karen Lasuik, Alecia Murray, Gordon Torigoe

== Rankings ==
+ Regular season polls	Poll	Pre- Season	Week 1	Week 2	Week 3	Week 4	Week 5	Week 6	Week 7	Week 8	Week 9	Week 10	Week 11	Week 12	Week 13	Week 14	Week 15	Week 16	Week 17	Week 18	Final
AP	NR	NR	NR	NR	NR	NR	NR														
Coaches	NR	NR	NR	NR	NR	NR	NR														

Legend
	Increase in ranking
	Decrease in ranking
	No change
(RV)	Received votes
(NR)	Not ranked

== See also ==
- Portland Pilots women's basketball
