= 2013–14 Washington Huskies women's basketball team =

Intercollegiate basketball season

2013–14 Washington Huskies women's basketball

WNIT, Quarterfinals
- Conference: Pac-12 Conference
- Record: 20–14 (10–8 Pac-12)
- Head coach: Mike Neighbors (1st season)
- Assistant coaches: Kevin Morrison (3rd season); Fred Castro (1st season); Adia Barnes (3rd season)
- Home arena: Alaska Airlines Arena

2013–14 Pac-12 Conference women's basketball standings
	Conf.				Overall
Team	W		L	PCT	W		L	PCT
No. 6 Stanford	17	–	1	.944	33	–	4	.892
No. 24 California	13	–	5	.722	22	–	10	.688
Oregon State	13	–	5	.722	24	–	11	.686
Arizona State	11	–	7	.611	23	–	10	.697
USC †	11	–	7	.611	22	–	13	.629
Washington	10	–	8	.556	20	–	14	.588
Washington State	9	–	9	.500	17	–	17	.500
UCLA	7	–	11	.389	13	–	18	.419
Colorado	6	–	12	.333	19	–	15	.559
Oregon	6	–	12	.333	16	–	16	.500
Utah	4	–	14	.222	12	–	19	.387
Arizona	1	–	17	.056	5	–	25	.167
† 2014 Pac-12 Tournament winner As of 6 April 2014; Rankings from AP poll

The 2013–14 Washington Huskies women's basketball team represented University of Washington during the 2013–14 NCAA Division I women's basketball season. The Huskies, led by first-year head coach Mike Neighbors, played their home games at the Alaska Airlines Arena and were members of the Pac-12 Conference. They finished the season with a record of 20–14 overall, 10–8 in Pac-12 play for a sixth-place finish. They lost in the first round in the 2014 Pac-12 Conference women's basketball tournament to Utah. They were invited to the 2014 Women's National Invitation Tournament, where they defeated Hawaii in the first round, Oregon in the second round, and San Diego in the third round before losing to UTEP in the quarterfinals.

== Notable win ==
The team had a 12–10 record when they faced Stanford, then the #3 rated team in the country. The Cardinal were on a 62-game consecutive conference road winning streak. It was Neighbors' first game on national TV as the game was being broadcast by ESPNU. The Huskies decided to try to limit the inside game of Stanford, which was led by Chiney Ogwumike, the conference's leading scorer. Ogwumike scored 23 points, but with less than a minute left in the game, the Huskies held a twelve-point lead, 85–73. Washington missed free throws, while Stanford's Bonnie Samuelson hit a three pointer. She hit another one with nine seconds to go, and the margin was down to four points. The Huskies had the ball, but when they failed to inbound within five seconds, the ball turned over to Stanford. Ogwumike was fouled, and hit one free throw to cut the lead to three points. On the inbounds, Stanford almost stole the ball, but there was a tie-up and the possession arrow favored the Huskies. Washington was fouled on the ensuing play and hit two free throws to secure the victory over Stanford.

== Roster ==
2013–14 Washington Huskies women's basketball team
Players
Coaches

Pos.	#	Name	Height	Year	Previous school	Hometown
PG	32	Jazmine Davis	5 ft 7 in (1.7 m)	Jr	Valley Christian	San Jose, Calif.
F	3	Talia Walton	6 ft 2 in (1.88 m)	RS So	Federal Way	Federal Way, Wash.
F/C	13	Katie Collier	6 ft 3 in (1.91 m)	RS Fr	Seattle Christian	Covington, Wash.
G/F	14	Heather Corral	6 ft 1 in (1.85 m)	So	Prairie	Vancouver, Wash.
G	30	Kassia Fortier	5 ft 8 in (1.73 m)	Sr	Skyline	Issaquah, Wash.
F/C	11	Mathilde Gilling	6 ft 3 in (1.91 m)	So	Rungsted Gymnasium	Rungsted Kyst, Denmark
F/C	0	Chantel Osahor	6 ft 2 in (1.88 m)	Fr	Saint Mary's	Phoenix, Ariz.
G	10	Kelsey Plum	5 ft 9 in (1.75 m)	Fr	La Jolla Country Day	San Diego, Calif.
G	21	Brianna Ruiz	5 ft 10 in (1.78 m)	Fr	Del Oro	Roseville, Calif.
G	1	Mercedes Wetmore	5 ft 8 in (1.73 m)	Sr	Auburn-Riverside	Lake Tapps, Wash.
F	23	Aminah Williams	6 ft 0 in (1.83 m)	Jr	Kennedy	Seattle, Wash.

Head coach

Mike Neighbors

Assistant coach(es)

Kevin Morrison
Fred Castro
Adia Barnes

Legend

- (C) Team captain
- (S) Suspended
- (I) Ineligible
- (W) Walk-on
- Injured
- Current redshirt

Roster
Last update: 2013-10-16

== Schedule ==
Date time, TV	Rank^{#}	Opponent^{#}	Result	Record	Site (attendance) city, state
Exhibition
10/31/2013*; 7:00 pm		Concordia	W 87–40	–	Alaska Airlines Arena (410); Seattle, WA
Non-conference regular season
11/08/2013*; 6:00 pm		at Saint Mary's	L 81–91	0–1	McKeon Pavilion (723); Moraga, CA
11/15/2013*; 12:00 pm		Portland	L 77–91	0–2	Alaska Airlines Arena (1,376); Seattle, WA
11/19/2013*; 7:00 pm		Seattle	W 82–60	1–2	Alaska Airlines Arena (1,567); Seattle, WA
12/04/2013*; 5:00 pm		at Houston	W 66–55	2–2	Hofheinz Pavilion (420); Houston, TX
12/07/2013*; 5:00 pm		at No. 12 Texas A&M	L 68–74	2–3	Reed Arena (4,169); College Station, TX
12/13/2013*; 7:30 pm, P12N		Wisconsin	W 80–67	3–3	Alaska Airlines Arena (1,474); Seattle, WA
12/15/2013*; 2:00 pm		Montana State	W 83–60	4–3	Alaska Airlines Arena (2,359); Seattle, WA
12/19/2013*; 2:30 pm		vs. Louisiana-Monroe; Duel In The Desert	W 81–77	5–3	Cox Pavilion (N/A); Paradise, NV
12/20/2013*; 2:30 pm		vs. DePaul; Duel In The Desert	L 66–73	5–4	Cox Pavilion (N/A); Paradise, NV
12/21/2013*; 12:30 pm		vs. Pittsburgh; Duel In The Desert	W 76–69	6–4	Cox Pavilion (N/A); Paradise, NV
12/30/2013*; 7:00 pm		UC Irvine	W 72–69	7–4	Alaska Airlines Arena (1,712); Seattle, WA
Pac-12 regular season
01/03/2014; 7:00 pm		Arizona	W 55–52	8–4 (1–0)	Alaska Airlines Arena (1,626); Seattle, WA
01/05/2014; 2:00 pm, P12N		No. 24 Arizona State	L 60–78	8–5 (1–1)	Alaska Airlines Arena (2,384); Seattle, WA
01/07/2014; 7:00 pm, P12N		at Washington State	L 80–82	8–6 (1–2)	Beasley Coliseum (914); Pullman, WA
01/11/2014; 3:00 pm, P12N		Washington State	L 76–85	8–7 (1–3)	Alaska Airlines Arena (1,744); Seattle, WA
01/17/2014; 7:00 pm		Utah	W 53–52 ^{OT}	9–7 (2–3)	Alaska Airlines Arena (1,642); Seattle, WA
01/19/2014; 4:00 pm, P12N		No. 21 Colorado	W 81–71	10–7 (3–3)	Alaska Airlines Arena (1,371); Seattle, WA
01/24/2014; 6:00 pm, P12N		at Oregon State	L 68–75	10–8 (3–4)	Gill Coliseum (1,121); Corvallis, OR
01/26/2014; 12:00 pm, P12N		at Oregon	L 85–101	10–9 (3–5)	Matthew Knight Arena (1,564); Eugene, OR
01/31/2014; 8:00 pm, P12N		at UCLA	W 70–58	11–9 (4–5)	Pauley Pavilion (1,422); Los Angeles, CA
02/02/2014; 11:00 am, P12N		at USC	W 63–55	12–9 (5–5)	Galen Center (423); Los Angeles, CA
02/07/2014; 8:00 pm, P12N		No. 23 California	L 65–70	12–10 (5–6)	Alaska Airlines Arena (1,782); Seattle, WA
02/09/2014; 12:30 pm, ESPNU		No. 3 Stanford	W 87–82	13–10 (6–6)	Alaska Airlines Arena (2,797); Seattle, WA
02/14/2014; 5:30 pm, P12N		at Colorado	W 87–80	14–10 (7–6)	Coors Events Center (1,880); Boulder, CO
02/16/2014; 2:00 pm		at Utah	W 67–66	15–10 (8–6)	Jon M. Huntsman Center (914); Salt Lake City, UT
02/21/2014; 6:00 pm, P12N		Oregon	W 108–100	16–10 (9–6)	Alaska Airlines Arena (1,903); Seattle, WA
02/23/2014; 2:00 pm		Oregon State	L 57–77	16–11 (9–7)	Alaska Airlines Arena (2,737); Seattle, WA
02/27/2014; 8:00 pm, P12N		at No. 5 Stanford	L 60–83	16–12 (9–8)	Maples Pavilion (3,132); Stanford, CA
03/01/2014; 5:30 pm, P12N		at No. 18 California	W 70–65	17–12 (10–8)	Haas Pavilion (3,900); Berkeley, CA
2014 Pac-12 Conference Women's Tournament
03/06/2014; 8:30 pm, P12N		vs. Utah; First Round	L 53–65	17–13	KeyArena (N/A); Seattle, WA
WNIT
03/21/2014*; 7:00 pm		Hawai'i; First Round	W 67–50	18–13	Alaska Airlines Arena (1,173); Seattle, WA
03/24/2014*; 7:00 pm		at Oregon; Second Round	W 93–85	19–13	Matthew Knight Arena (733); Eugene, OR
03/26/2014*; 7:00 pm		San Diego; Third Round	W 62–55	20–13	Alaska Airlines Arena (1,080); Seattle, WA
03/31/2014*; 6:00 pm		at UTEP; Quarterfinals	L 63–70	20–14	Don Haskins Center (10,227); El Paso, TX
*Non-conference game. ^{#}Rankings from AP Poll. (#) Tournament seedings in parentheses. All times are in Pacific Time.

== See also ==
- 2013–14 Washington Huskies men's basketball team
