= 2013–14 Washington State Cougars women's basketball team =

Intercollegiate basketball season

2013–14 Washington State Cougars women's basketball

WNIT, First Round
- Conference: Pac-12 Conference
- Record: 17–17 (9–9 Pac-12)
- Head coach: June Daugherty
- Assistant coaches: Mike Daugherty; Brian Holsinger; Ashley Grover
- Home arena: Beasley Coliseum

2013–14 Pac-12 Conference women's basketball standings
	Conf.				Overall
Team	W		L	PCT	W		L	PCT
No. 6 Stanford	17	–	1	.944	33	–	4	.892
No. 24 California	13	–	5	.722	22	–	10	.688
Oregon State	13	–	5	.722	24	–	11	.686
Arizona State	11	–	7	.611	23	–	10	.697
USC †	11	–	7	.611	22	–	13	.629
Washington	10	–	8	.556	20	–	14	.588
Washington State	9	–	9	.500	17	–	17	.500
UCLA	7	–	11	.389	13	–	18	.419
Colorado	6	–	12	.333	19	–	15	.559
Oregon	6	–	12	.333	16	–	16	.500
Utah	4	–	14	.222	12	–	19	.387
Arizona	1	–	17	.056	5	–	25	.167
† 2014 Pac-12 Tournament winner As of 6 April 2014; Rankings from AP poll

The 2013–14 Washington State Cougars women's basketball team represented Washington State University during the 2013–14 NCAA Division I women's basketball season. The Cougars, led by seventh-year head coach June Daugherty, played their games at the Beasley Coliseum and were members of the Pac-12 Conference. They finished the season with a record of 17–17 overall, 9–9 in Pac-12 play for a seventh-place finish. They lost in the semifinals of the 2014 Pac-12 Conference women's basketball tournament to Oregon State. They were invited to the 2014 Women's National Invitation Tournament, where they lost to Montana in the first round.

== Roster ==
#	Name	Height	Position	Class	Hometown
3	Lia Galdeira	5'11"	G	Sophomore	Kamuela, HI
5	Tia Presley	5'9"	G	Junior	Spokane, WA
10	Alexas Williamson	5'8"	G	Sophomore	Chino Hills, CA
11	Dawnyelle Awa	5'9"	G	Sophomore	Kailua-Kona, HI
12	Taylor Edmondson	5'11"	G	Sophomore	Carlsbad, NM
15	Ivana Kmetovska	6'3"	F	Freshman	Skopje, Macedonia
22	Sage Romberg	6'1"	G/F	Senior	McKinleyville, CA
23	Shalie Dheensaw	6'4"	F/C	Junior	Victoria, BC, Canada
24	Brandi Thomas	6'1"	G/F	Senior	McCleary, WA
34	Mariah Cooks	6'0"	F	Sophomore	Santa Maria, CA
42	Hana Potter	6'2"	F	Senior	St. Louis Park, MN

== Schedule ==
Date time, TV	Rank^{#}	Opponent^{#}	Result	Record	Site (attendance) city, state
Exhibition
10/30/2013*; 7:00 pm		Master's College	W 94–47	–	Beasley Coliseum (N/A); Pullman, WA
Regular season
11/10/2013*; 1:00 pm		Syracuse	L 65–69	0–1	Beasley Coliseum (1,017); Pullman, WA
11/12/2013*; 7:00 pm		at Seattle	W 81–72	1–1	Connolly Center (307); Seattle, WA
11/15/2013*; 10:00 pm, OC Sports		at Hawaii; Rainbow Wahine Classic	L 66–77	1–2	Stan Sheriff Center (1,988); Honolulu, HI
11/16/2013*; 3:00 pm		vs. West Virginia; Rainbow Wahine Classic	L 66–88	1–3	Stan Sheriff Center (N/A); Honolulu, HI
11/17/2013*; 4:30 pm		vs. Ole Miss; Rainbow Wahine Classic	W 79–65	2–3	Stan Sheriff Center (N/A); Honolulu, HI
11/22/2013*; 7:00 pm		Fresno State	W 92–79	3–3	Beasley Coliseum (741); Pullman, WA
11/26/2013*; 6:00 pm, BYUtv		at BYU	L 73–80	3–4	Marriott Center (432); Provo, UT
11/30/2013*; 3:00 pm		at No. 10 Nebraska	W 76–72	4–4	Pinnacle Bank Arena (5,933); Lincoln, NE
12/04/2013*; 7:00 pm		Cal State Northridge	W 68–59	5–4	Beasley Coliseum (612); Pullman, WA
12/15/2013*; 11:00 am		at Dayton	L 76–87	5–5	UD Arena (1,777); Dayton, OH
12/18/2013*; 4:00 pm		vs. UC Riverside	W 77–73 ^{OT}	6–5	Toyota Center (N/A); Kennewick, WA
12/21/2013*; 11:30 am, P12N		No. 25 Gonzaga	L 62–70	6–6	Beasley Coliseum (1,280); Pullman, WA
01/03/2014; 7:00 pm		No. 24 Arizona State	W 85–78	7–6 (1–0)	Beasley Coliseum (889); Pullman, WA
01/05/2014; 12:00 pm, P12N		Arizona	W 61–59	8–6 (2–0)	Beasley Coliseum (621); Pullman, WA
01/07/2014; 7:00 pm, P12N		Washington	W 82–80	9–6 (3–0)	Beasley Coliseum (914); Pullman, WA
01/11/2014; 3:00 pm, P12N		at Washington	W 85–76	10–6 (4–0)	Alaska Airlines Arena (1,744); Seattle, WA
01/17/2014; 7:00 pm		No. 21 Colorado	W 70–60	11–6 (5–0)	Beasley Coliseum (1,423); Pullman, WA
01/19/2014; 12:00 pm, P12N		Utah	L 57–59	11–7 (5–1)	Beasley Coliseum (957); Pullman, WA
01/24/2014; 7:00 pm		at Oregon	L 66–82	11–8 (5–2)	Matthew Knight Arena (1,146); Eugene, OR
01/26/2014; 2:00 pm		at Oregon State	L 57–72	11–9 (5–3)	Gill Coliseum (1,409); Corvallis, OR
01/31/2014; 6:00 pm, P12N		at USC	W 79–75	12–9 (6–3)	Galen Center (358); Los Angeles, CA
02/02/2014; 12:00 pm		at UCLA	L 72–79	12–10 (6–4)	Pauley Pavilion (820); Los Angeles, CA
02/07/2014; 6:00 pm, P12N		No. 3 Stanford	L 69–77	12–11 (6–5)	Beasley Coliseum (1,015); Pullman, WA
02/09/2014; 2:00 pm, P12N		No. 23 California	L 70–87	12–12 (6–6)	Beasley Coliseum (693); Pullman, WA
02/14/2014; 6:00 pm		at Utah	W 83–73	13–12 (7–6)	Jon M. Huntsman Center (987); Salt Lake City, UT
02/16/2014; 12:00 pm, P12N		at Colorado	W 80–77	14–12 (8–6)	Coors Events Center (2,446); Boulder, CO
02/21/2014; 7:00 pm		Oregon State	L 53–67	14–13 (8–7)	Beasley Coliseum (821); Pullman, WA
02/23/2014; 1:00 pm		Oregon	W 108–88	15–13 (9–7)	Beasley Coliseum (752); Pullman, WA
02/27/2014; 6:00 pm, P12N		at No. 18 California	L 68–75 ^{OT}	15–14 (9–8)	Haas Pavilion (1,688); Berkeley, CA
03/01/2014; 7:30 pm, P12N		at No. 5 Stanford	L 64–84	15–15 (9–9)	Maples Pavilion (5,628); Stanford, CA
2014 Pac-12 Tournament
03/06/2014; 6:00 pm, P12N		vs. Oregon; First Round	W 107–100	16–15	KeyArena (N/A); Seattle, WA
03/07/2014; 6:00 pm, P12N		vs. No. 20 California; Quarterfinals	W 91–83	17–15	KeyArena (N/A); Seattle, WA
03/08/2014; 8:30 pm, P12N		vs. Oregon State; Semifinals	L 60–70	17–16	KeyArena (6,073); Seattle, WA
WNIT
03/19/2014*; 6:00 pm		at Montana; First Round	L 78–90	17–17	Dahlberg Arena (2,125); Missoula, MT
*Non-conference game. ^{#}Rankings from AP Poll. (#) Tournament seedings in parentheses. All times are in Pacific Time.

== See also ==
- 2013–14 Washington State Cougars men's basketball team
