= 2013–14 Utah Utes women's basketball team =

Intercollegiate basketball season

2013–14 Utah Utes women's basketball
- Conference: Pac-12 Conference
- Record: 12–19 (4–14 Pac–12)
- Head coach: Anthony Levrets (4th season)
- Assistant coaches: Velaida Harris (5th season); Matt Legerski (11th season); Willette White (3rd season)
- Home arena: Jon M. Huntsman Center

2013–14 Pac-12 Conference women's basketball standings
	Conf.				Overall
Team	W		L	PCT	W		L	PCT
No. 6 Stanford	17	–	1	.944	33	–	4	.892
No. 24 California	13	–	5	.722	22	–	10	.688
Oregon State	13	–	5	.722	24	–	11	.686
Arizona State	11	–	7	.611	23	–	10	.697
USC †	11	–	7	.611	22	–	13	.629
Washington	10	–	8	.556	20	–	14	.588
Washington State	9	–	9	.500	17	–	17	.500
UCLA	7	–	11	.389	13	–	18	.419
Colorado	6	–	12	.333	19	–	15	.559
Oregon	6	–	12	.333	16	–	16	.500
Utah	4	–	14	.222	12	–	19	.387
Arizona	1	–	17	.056	5	–	25	.167
† 2014 Pac-12 Tournament winner As of 6 April 2014; Rankings from AP poll

The 2013–14 Utah Utes women's basketball team represented the University of Utah during the 2013–14 NCAA Division I men's basketball season. They played their home games at the Jon M. Huntsman Center in Salt Lake City, Utah and were a member of the Pac-12 Conference. The Utes were led by fourth-year head coach Anthony Levrets. They finished with a record of 12–19 overall, 4–14 in Pac-12 play for an eleventh-place finish. They lost in the quarterfinals in the 2014 Pac-12 Conference women's basketball tournament to Oregon State.

== Roster ==
#	Name	Position	Height	Class	Hometown	Last college or high school
3	Malia Nawahine	F	5–10	Fr.	Springville, Utah	Springville
5	Cheyenne Wilson	G	5–11	Jr.	Seattle, Washington	Cleveland
10	Nakia Arquette	F	6–1	RS Fr.	Spokane, Washington	Lewis & Clark
11	Taryn Wicijowski	F	6–3	RS Sr.	Regina, Saskatchewan	National Elite Development Academy
12	Emily Potter	F	6-5	Fr.	Winnipeg, Manitoba	Glenlawn Collegiate
13	Devri Owens	G	5–8	Fr.	Plano, Texas	Plano West
14	Paige Crozon	G	6–1	So.	Humboldt, Saskatchewan	Humboldt Collegiate Institute
15	Michelle Plouffe	F	6–4	Sr.	Edmonton, Alberta	Harry Ainlay
21	Wendy Anae	F	6–3	Fr.	San Diego, California	Cathedral Catholic
22	Danielle Rodriguez	G	5–10	So.	Downey, California	Warren
23	Ariel Reynolds	F	6–2	Sr.	Portland, Oregon	Northwest Florida State College
24	Valerie Nawahine	G	5–9	So.	Springville, Utah	BYU
25	Awa Kalmstrom	G	5–7	So.	Stockholm, Sweden	Fryshuset Gymnasium
31	Ciera Dunbar	G	5–10	RS Jr.	Elko, Nevada	Elko

== Schedule and results ==
All home games and conference road games were broadcast on television on Pac-12 Rocky Mountain or Pac-12 Digital. All games were broadcast on the radio and streamed online by KALL 700 Sports, home of the Utah Utes.

Date time, TV	Rank^{#}	Opponent^{#}	Result	Record	Site (attendance) city, state
Exhibition
11/01/2013*; 5:15 pm		Mary	W 81–57	–	Jon M. Huntsman Center (313); Salt Lake City, UT
Regular season
11/08/2013*; 8:30 pm		Denver	W 73–56	1–0	Jon M. Huntsman Center (605); Salt Lake City, UT
11/15/2013*; 5:00 pm, P12N		No. 15 Nebraska	L 69–75	1–1	Jon M. Huntsman Center (949); Salt Lake City, UT
11/19/2013*; 7:00 pm		at Utah State	L 61–77	1–2	Smith Spectrum (803); Logan, UT
11/26/2013*; 4:45 pm		at UNLV	W 66–59	2–2	Thomas & Mack Center (562); Las Vegas, NV
11/29/2013*; 5:00 pm		vs. Butler; South Point Thanksgiving Shootout	L 54–66	2–3	South Point Arena (N/A); Las Vegas, NV
11/30/2013*; 2:30 pm		vs. Marquette; South Point Thanksgiving Shootout	L 65–72	2–4	South Point Arena (413); Las Vegas, NV
12/07/2013*; 6:00 pm		Nevada	W 61–57	3–4	Jon M. Huntsman Center (597); Salt Lake City, UT
12/11/2013*; 7:00 pm		Utah Valley	W 81–70	4–4	Jon M. Huntsman Center (649); Salt Lake City, UT
12/14/2013*; 2:00 pm, BYUtv		at BYU; Desert First Duel	W 82–74	5–4	Marriott Center (1,070); Provo, UT
12/21/2013*; 3:00 pm		Samford	W 69–49	6–4	Jon M. Huntsman Center (580); Salt Lake City, UT
12/30/2013*; 7:00 pm		UC Santa Barbara	W 66–57	7–4	Jon M. Huntsman Center (703); Salt Lake City, UT
01/03/2014; 7:00 pm, P12N		at UCLA	L 38–55	7–5 (0–1)	Pauley Pavilion (785); Los Angeles, CA
01/05/2014; 5:00 pm, P12N		at USC	L 47–55	7–6 (0–2)	Galen Center (743); Los Angeles, CA
01/10/2014; 6:00 pm, P12N		No. 4 Stanford	L 61–87	7–7 (0–3)	Jon M. Huntsman Center (1,652); Salt Lake City, UT
01/12/2014; 1:00 pm, P12N		No. 19 California	L 59–68	7–8 (0–4)	Jon M. Huntsman Center (811); Salt Lake City, UT
01/17/2014; 8:00 pm		at Washington	L 52–53 ^{OT}	7–9 (0–5)	Alaska Airlines Arena (1,371); Seattle, WA
01/19/2014; 1:00 pm, P12N		at Washington State	W 59–57	8–9 (1–5)	Beasley Coliseum (957); Pullman, WA
01/24/2014; 7:00 pm		Arizona State	L 62–65	8–10 (1–6)	Jon M. Huntsman Center (1,007); Salt Lake City, UT
01/26/2014; 3:00 pm		Arizona	W 60–57	9–10 (2–6)	Jon M. Huntsman Center (913); Salt Lake City, UT
01/29/2014; 7:00 pm, P12N		Colorado	W 58–55	10–10 (3–6)	Jon M. Huntsman Center (855); Salt Lake City, UT
02/02/2014; 12:00 pm, P12N		at Colorado	L 45–61	10–11 (3–7)	Coors Events Center (1,738); Boulder, CO
02/08/2014; 3:00 pm		at Oregon	L 71–93	10–12 (3–8)	Matthew Knight Arena (384); Eugene, OR
02/10/2014; 7:00 pm, P12N		at Oregon State	L 47–60	10–13 (3–9)	Gill Coliseum (572); Beaverton, OR
02/14/2014; 7:00 pm, P12N		Washington State	L 73–83	10–14 (3–10)	Jon M. Huntsman Center (987); Salt Lake City, UT
02/16/2014; 3:00 pm		Washington	L 66–67	10–15 (3–11)	Jon M. Huntsman Center (914); Salt Lake City, UT
02/21/2014; 7:00 pm		at Arizona	W 52–47	11–15 (4–11)	McKale Center (1,186); Tucson, AZ
02/23/2014; 1:00 pm		at No. 20 Arizona State	L 40–60	11–16 (4–12)	Wells Fargo Arena (2,008); Tempe, AZ
02/27/2014; 7:00 pm, P12N		USC	L 57–67	11–17 (4–13)	Jon M. Huntsman Center (1,133); Salt Lake City, UT
03/02/2014; 2:00 pm, P12N		UCLA	L 52–62	11–18 (4–14)	Jon M. Huntsman Center (934); Salt Lake City, UT
2014 Pac-12 Conference women's basketball tournament
03/06/2014; 9:30 pm, P12N		vs. Washington; First Round	W 65–53	12–18	KeyArena (N/A); Seattle, WA
03/07/2014; 9:30 pm, P12N		vs. Oregon State; Quarterfinals	L 35–50	12–19	KeyArena (4,396); Seattle, WA
*Non-conference game. ^{#}Rankings from AP Poll/Coaches' Poll. (#) Tournament seedings in parentheses. All times are in Mountain Time.

== See also ==
- 2013–14 Utah Utes men's basketball team
