= 2002–03 Mid-American Conference women's basketball season =

- League: NCAA Division I
- Sport: Basketball
- Number of teams: 13

Regular season
- Champions: Ball State and Toledo
- Season MVP: Tamara Bowie

Tournament
- Champions: Western Michigan
- Runners-up: Ball State
- Finals MVP: Casey Rost

Mid-American women's basketball seasons
- ← 2001–02 2003–04 →

2002–03 Mid-American Conference women's basketball standings
	Conf.				Overall
Team	W		L	PCT	W		L	PCT
Miami (OH)	11	–	5	.688	17	–	12	.586
Kent State	10	–	6	.625	16	–	13	.552
Buffalo	9	–	7	.563	18	–	11	.621
Marshall	7	–	9	.438	12	–	17	.414
Ohio	5	–	11	.313	9	–	19	.321
Akron	1	–	15	.063	2	–	26	.071
West
Ball State	12	–	4	.750	20	–	9	.690
Toledo	12	–	4	.750	20	–	9	.690
Western Michigan †	10	–	6	.625	20	–	11	.645
Eastern Michigan	9	–	7	.563	13	–	16	.448
Northern Illinois	8	–	8	.500	12	–	16	.429
Bowling Green	5	–	11	.313	12	–	16	.429
Central Michigan	5	–	11	.313	11	–	17	.393
† 2003 MAC tournament winner Rankings from AP poll

The 2002–03 Mid-American Conference women's basketball season began with practices in October 2003, followed by the start of the 2002–03 NCAA Division I women's basketball season in November. Conference play began in January 2003 and concluded in March 2003. Ball State and Toledo shared the regular season title with a record of 12–4. Tamara Bowie of Ball State was MAC player of the year.

Fourth seeded Western Michigan won the MAC tournament over Ball State. Casey Rost of Western Michigan was the tournament MVP. Western Michigan lost to Stanford in the first round of the NCAA tournament. Ball State and Toledo played in the WNIT.

== Preseason Awards ==
The preseason poll was announced by the league office on October 23, 2002.

=== Preseason women's basketball poll ===
(First place votes in parentheses)

==== East Division ====
1. Kent State (24) 189
2. Miami (9) 174
3. Marshall 106
4. Ohio 100
5. Buffalo 91
6. Akron 33

==== West Division ====
1. Ball State (29) 225
2. Western Michigan 173
3. Toledo 162
4. Northern Illinois (4) 152
5. Eastern Michigan 100
6. Bowling Green (9) 73
7. Central Michigan 39

==== Tournament Champion ====
Kent State (15), Ball State (11), Miami (7)

=== Honors ===
Honor	Recipient
Preseason All-MAC East	Andrea Csaszar, Kent State
Preseason All-MAC East	Heather Cusick, Miami
Preseason All-MAC East	Ida Dotson, Marshall
Preseason All-MAC East	Jessica Kochendorfer, Buffalo
Preseason All-MAC East	Valerie Zona, Kent State
Preseason All-MAC West	Tamara Bowie, Ball State
Preseason All-MAC West	Tia Davis, Toledo
Preseason All-MAC West	Kristin Koetsier, Western Michigan
Preseason All-MAC West	Francine Miller, Bowling Green
Preseason All-MAC West	Jennifer Youngblood, Northern Illinois

== Postseason ==
=== Postseason Awards ===
1. Coach of the Year: Mark Ehlen, Toledo
2. Player of the Year: Tamara Bowie, Ball State
3. Freshman of the Year: Joi Scott, Northern Illinois
4. Defensive Player of the Year: Maria Jilian, Western Michigan
5. Sixth Man of the Year: Kim Lancaster, Miami

=== Honors ===
Honor	Recipient
Postseason All-MAC First Team	Tamara Bowie, Ball State
Postseason All-MAC First Team	Heather Cusick, Miami
Postseason All-MAC First Team	Tia Davis, Toledo
Postseason All-MAC First Team	Kristin Koetsier, Western Michigan
Postseason All-MAC First Team	Casey Rost, Western Michigan
Postseason All-MAC Second Team	Ryan Coleman, Eastern Michigan
Postseason All-MAC Second Team	Johna Goff, Ball State
Postseason All-MAC Second Team	Kate McMeeken-Ruscoe, Buffalo
Postseason All-MAC Second Team	Jamie Rubis, Kent State
Postseason All-MAC Second Team	Jennifer Youngblood, Northern Illinois
Postseason All-MAC Honorable Mention	Latreece Bagley, Ohio
Postseason All-MAC Honorable Mention	Catie Knable, Marshall
Postseason All-MAC Honorable Mention	Katalin Kollat, Kent State
Postseason All-MAC Honorable Mention	Cassandra Martin, Akron
Postseason All-MAC Honorable Mention	Francine Miller, Bowling Green
Postseason All-MAC Honorable Mention	Abby Wiseman, Eastern Michigan
Postseason All-MAC Honorable Mention	Valerie Zona, Kent State
All-MAC Freshman Team	Dana Collins, Ball State
All-MAC Freshman Team	Nikki Knapp, Eastern Michigan
All-MAC Freshman Team	Erin Kuhl, Central Michigan
All-MAC Freshman Team	Joi Scott, Northern Illinois
All-MAC Freshman Team	Sikeetha Shepard-Hall, Marshall

== See also ==
2002–03 Mid-American Conference men's basketball season
