= 2006–07 Mid-American Conference women's basketball season =

- League: NCAA Division I
- Sport: Basketball
- Teams: 12

Regular season
- Champions: Bowling Green
- Runners-up: Ball State
- Season MVP: Ali Mann and Carrie Moore

Tournament
- Champions: Bowling Green
- Runners-up: Ball State
- Finals MVP: Carin Horne

Mid-American women's basketball seasons
- ← 2005–06 2007–08 →

2006–07 Mid-American Conference women's basketball standings
	Conf.				Overall
Team	W		L	PCT	W		L	PCT
No. 20 Bowling Green †	16	–	1	.941	29	–	3	.906
Kent State	11	–	5	.688	15	–	13	.536
Ohio	10	–	6	.625	18	–	12	.600
Miami (OH)	6	–	10	.375	12	–	18	.400
Buffalo	5	–	11	.313	10	–	19	.345
Akron	3	–	13	.188	10	–	19	.345
West
Ball State	13	–	3	.813	24	–	6	.800
Eastern Michigan	10	–	7	.588	16	–	13	.552
Northern Illinois	8	–	8	.500	19	–	12	.613
Western Michigan	6	–	10	.375	14	–	18	.438
Toledo	6	–	10	.375	11	–	19	.367
Central Michigan	3	–	13	.188	11	–	19	.367
† 2007 MAC tournament winner Rankings from AP poll

The 2006–07 Mid-American Conference women's basketball season began with practices in October 2006, followed by the start of the 2006–07 NCAA Division I women's basketball season in November. Conference play began in January 2007 and concluded in March 2007. Bowling Green won the regular season title with a record of 16–1 over West Division champion Ball State. Ali Mann of Bowling Green and Carrie Moore of Western Michigan shared MAC player of the year.

Regular season champion Bowling Green won the MAC tournament over Ball State. Carin Horne of Bowling Green was the tournament MVP. Bowling Green defeated Oklahoma State and Vanderbilt before losing to Arizona State in the Sweet Sixteen of the NCAA tournament. Ball State played in the WNIT.

== Preseason Awards ==
The preseason poll was announced by the league office on October 24, 2006.

=== Preseason women's basketball poll ===
(First place votes in parentheses)

==== East Division ====
1. Bowling Green (40) 245
2. Kent State (1) 193
3. Miami 136
4. Ohio 115
5. Buffalo 112
6. Akron 60

==== West Division ====
1. Eastern Michigan (21) 214
2. Western Michigan (8) 188
3. Ball State 996) 157
4. Northern Illinois (6) 142
5. Toledo 94
6. Central Michigan 66

==== Tournament Champion ====
Bowling Green (35), Kent State (2), Western Michigan (2), Toledo (1)

=== Honors ===
Honor	Recipient
Preseason All-MAC East	Kate Achter, Bowling Green
Preseason All-MAC East	Liz Honegger, Bowling Green
Preseason All-MAC East	Ali Mann, Bowling Green
Preseason All-MAC East	Heather Turner, Buffalo
Preseason All-MAC East	Rachel Frederick, Ohio
Preseason All-MAC West	Julie DeMuth, Ball State
Preseason All-MAC West	Patrice McKinney, Eastern Michigan
Preseason All-MAC West	Stephanie Raymond, Northern Illinois
Preseason All-MAC West	Danielle Bishop, Toledo
Preseason All-MAC West	Carrie Moore, Western Michigan

== Postseason ==
=== Postseason Awards ===
1. Coach of the Year: Curt Miller, Bowling Green
2. Player of the Year: Ali Mann, Bowling Green and Carrie Moore, Western Michigan
3. Freshman of the Year: Alyssa Pittman, Eastern Michigan
4. Defensive Player of the Year: Patrice McKinney, Eastern Michigan
5. Sixth Man of the Year: Amber Flynn, Bowling Green

=== Honors ===
Honor	Recipient
Postseason All-MAC first team	Ali Mann, Bowling Green
Postseason All-MAC first team	Carrie Moore, Western Michigan
Postseason All-MAC first team	Julie DeMuth, Ball State
Postseason All-MAC first team	Amanda Jackson, Guard, Miami
Postseason All-MAC first team	Stephanie Raymond, Northern Illinois
Postseason All-MAC second team	La’kia Stewart, Kent State
Postseason All-MAC second team	Kristin Peoples, Kent State
Postseason All-MAC second team	Kate Achter, Bowling Green
Postseason All-MAC second team	Sarah VanMetre, Eastern Michigan
Postseason All-MAC second team	Lauren Kohn, Ohio
Postseason All-MAC third team	Niki McCoy, Akron
Postseason All-MAC third team	Carin Horne, Bowling Green
Postseason All-MAC third team	Patrice McKinney, Eastern Michigan
Postseason All-MAC third team	Kristin Wiener, Northern Illinois
Postseason All-MAC third team	Rachel Frederick, Ohio
Postseason All-MAC honorable mention	Kelsey Corbin, Ball State
Postseason All-MAC honorable mention	Liz Honegger, Bowling Green
Postseason All-MAC honorable mention	Heather Turner, Buffalo
Postseason All-MAC honorable mention	Ann Skufca, Central Michigan
Postseason All-MAC honorable mention	Danielle Bishop, Toledo
All-MAC freshman team	Alyssa Pittman, Eastern Michigan
All-MAC freshman team	Sarah Tokodi, Akron
All-MAC freshman team	Audrey McDonald, Ball State
All-MAC freshman team	Jamilah Humes, Kent State
All-MAC freshman team	Jennifer Bushby, Ohio

== See also ==
- 2006–07 Mid-American Conference men's basketball season
