= 2005–06 Mid-American Conference women's basketball season =

- League: NCAA Division I
- Sport: Basketball
- Number of teams: 12

Regular season
- Champions: Bowling Green
- Runners-up: Eastern Michigan
- Season MVP: Lindsay Shearer

Tournament
- Champions: Bowling Green
- Runners-up: Kent State
- Finals MVP: Ali Mann

Mid-American women's basketball seasons
- ← 2004–05 2006–07 →

2005–06 Mid-American Conference women's basketball standings
	Conf.				Overall
Team	W		L	PCT	W		L	PCT
No. 23 Bowling Green †	16	–	0	1.000	28	–	2	.933
Kent State	12	–	4	.750	21	–	9	.700
Buffalo	5	–	11	.313	10	–	18	.357
Ohio	5	–	11	.313	9	–	20	.310
Miami (OH)	3	–	12	.200	8	–	20	.286
Akron	1	–	14	.067	5	–	23	.179
West
Eastern Michigan	15	–	1	.938	22	–	7	.759
Western Michigan	11	–	5	.688	13	–	14	.481
Ball State	9	–	7	.563	17	–	12	.586
Central Michigan	7	–	9	.438	16	–	12	.571
Northern Illinois	7	–	9	.438	12	–	17	.414
Toledo	4	–	12	.250	11	–	18	.379
† 2006 MAC tournament winner Rankings from AP poll

The 2005–06 Mid-American Conference women's basketball season began with practices in October 2005, followed by the start of the 2005–06 NCAA Division I women's basketball season in November. Conference play began in January 2006 and concluded in March 2006. Bowling Green won the regular season title with a record of 16–0 by one game over West Division champion Eastern Michigan. Lindsay Shearer of Kent State shared MAC player of the year.

Regular season champion Bowling Green won the MAC tournament over Kent State. Ali Mann of Bowling Green was the tournament MVP. Bowling Green lost to UCLA in the first of the NCAA tournament. Eastern Michigan played in the WNIT.

== Preseason Awards ==
The preseason poll was announced by the league office on October 26, 2005.

=== Preseason women's basketball poll ===
(First place votes in parentheses)

==== East Division ====
1. Bowling Green (17) 132
2. Kent State (6) 117
3. Miami 93
4. Ohio 68
5. Buffalo 40
6. Akron 33

==== West Division ====
1. Eastern Michigan (20) 132
2. Western Michigan (3) 99
3. Ball State 86
4. Toledo 83
5. Northern Illinois 44
6. Central Michigan 39

==== Tournament Champion ====
Bowling Green (15), Kent State (5), Eastern Michigan (4), Western Michigan (1)

=== Honors ===
Honor	Recipient
Preseason All-MAC East	Liz Honegger, Bowling Green
Preseason All-MAC East	Ali Mann, Bowling Green
Preseason All-MAC East	Lindsay Shearer, Kent State
Preseason All-MAC East	Malika Willoughby, Kent State
Preseason All-MAC East	Cindi Merrill, Miami
Preseason All-MAC West	Nikki Knapp, Eastern Michigan
Preseason All-MAC West	Ryan Coleman, Eastern Michigan
Preseason All-MAC West	Stephanie Raymond, Northern Illinois
Preseason All-MAC West	Danielle Bishop, Toledo
Preseason All-MAC West	Carrie Moore, Western Michigan

== Postseason ==
=== Postseason Awards ===
1. Coach of the Year: Curt Miller, Bowling Green
2. Player of the Year: Lindsay Shearer, Kent State
3. Freshman of the Year: Rachel Frederick, Ohio
4. Defensive Player of the Year: Malika Willoughby, Kent State
5. Sixth Man of the Year: La'kia Stewart, Kent State

=== Honors ===
Honor	Recipient
Postseason All-MAC First Team	Lindsay Shearer, Kent State
Postseason All-MAC First Team	Ryan Coleman, Eastern Michigan
Postseason All-MAC First Team	Carrie Moore, Western Michigan
Postseason All-MAC First Team	Casey Rost, Western Michigan
Postseason All-MAC First Team	Ali Mann, Bowling Green
Postseason All-MAC Second Team	Liz Honegger, Bowling Green
Postseason All-MAC Second Team	Kate Achter, Bowling Green
Postseason All-MAC Second Team	Nikki Knapp, Eastern Michigan
Postseason All-MAC Second Team	Patrice McKinney, Eastern Michigan
Postseason All-MAC Second Team	Stephanie Raymond, Northern Illinois
Postseason All-MAC Third Team	Jessie Crooks, Akron
Postseason All-MAC Third Team	Julie DeMuth, Ball State
Postseason All-MAC Third Team	Patrice McKinney, Eastern Michigan
Postseason All-MAC Third Team	Carin Horne, Bowling Green
Postseason All-MAC Third Team	Heather Turner, Buffalo
Postseason All-MAC Third Team	Cindi Merrill, Miami
Postseason All-MAC Honorable Mention	Ann Skufca, Central Michigan
Postseason All-MAC Honorable Mention	Malika Willoughby, Kent State
Postseason All-MAC Honorable Mention	Kristin Wiener, Northern Illinois
Postseason All-MAC Honorable Mention	Rachel Frederick, Ohio
Postseason All-MAC Honorable Mention	Simone Redd, Ohio
Postseason All-MAC Honorable Mention	Danielle Bishop, Toledo
All-MAC Freshman Team	Niki McCoy, Akron
All-MAC Freshman Team	Jamie Schiebner, Buffalo
All-MAC Freshman Team	Jenna Schone, Miami
All-MAC Freshman Team	Rachel Frederick, Ohio
All-MAC Freshman Team	Diana Reindl, Toledo

== See also ==
2005–06 Mid-American Conference men's basketball season
