= 2006–07 Ohio Bobcats women's basketball team =

Intercollegiate basketball season

2006–07 Ohio Bobcats women's basketball
- Conference: Mid-American Conference
- East Division
- Record: 18–12 (10–6 MAC)
- Head coach: Sylvia Crawley (1st season)
- Home arena: Convocation Center

2006–07 Mid-American Conference women's basketball standings
	Conf.				Overall
Team	W		L	PCT	W		L	PCT
No. 20 Bowling Green †	16	–	1	.941	29	–	3	.906
Kent State	11	–	5	.688	15	–	13	.536
Ohio	10	–	6	.625	18	–	12	.600
Miami (OH)	6	–	10	.375	12	–	18	.400
Buffalo	5	–	11	.313	10	–	19	.345
Akron	3	–	13	.188	10	–	19	.345
West
Ball State	13	–	3	.813	24	–	6	.800
Eastern Michigan	10	–	7	.588	16	–	13	.552
Northern Illinois	8	–	8	.500	19	–	12	.613
Western Michigan	6	–	10	.375	14	–	18	.438
Toledo	6	–	10	.375	11	–	19	.367
Central Michigan	3	–	13	.188	11	–	19	.367
† 2007 MAC tournament winner Rankings from AP poll

The 2006–07 Ohio Bobcats women's basketball team represented Ohio University during the 2006–07 NCAA Division I women's basketball season. The Bobcats, led by first year head coach Sylvia Crawley, played their home games at the Convocation Center in Athens, Ohio as a member of the Mid-American Conference. They finished the season 18–12 and 10–6 in MAC play.

== Preseason ==
The preseason poll was announced by the league office on October 24, 2006. Ohio was picked fourth in the MAC East.

=== Preseason women's basketball poll ===
(First place votes in parentheses)

==== East Division ====
1. Bowling Green (40) 245
2. Kent State (1) 193
3. Miami 136
4. Ohio 115
5. Buffalo 112
6. Akron 60

==== West Division ====
1. Eastern Michigan (21) 214
2. Western Michigan (8) 188
3. Ball State 996) 157
4. Northern Illinois (6) 142
5. Toledo 94
6. Central Michigan 66

==== Tournament Champion ====
Bowling Green (35), Kent State (2), Western Michigan (2), Toledo (1)

=== Preseason All-MAC ===
Preseason All-MAC teams
Team	Player	Position	Year
Preseason All-MAC East	Rachel Frederick		

== Schedule ==
Date time, TV	Rank^{#}	Opponent^{#}	Result	Record	Site (attendance) city, state
Non-conference regular season
Nov 10, 2006*		Navy	W 72–49	1–0	
Nov 17, 2006*		Cleveland State	W 87–64	2–0	
Nov 26, 2006*		Butler	W 84–53	3–0	
Dec 1, 2006*		Lehigh	W 57–40	4–0	
Dec 4, 2006*		at Western Illinois	W 67–43	5–0	
Dec 6, 2006*		at Missouri	L 67–70	5–1	
Dec 9, 2006*		Pittsburgh	L 69–77	5–2	
Dec 13, 2006*		at Auburn	L 54–73	5–3	
Dec 16, 2006*		Marshall	W 74–71	6–3	
Dec 21, 2006*		at Robert Morris	L 70–79	6–4	
Dec 29, 2006*		vs. High Point	W 82–70	7–4	
Dec 30, 2006*		at Florida Atlantic	L 56–58	7–5	
MAC regular season
Jan 3, 2007		at Kent State	L 63–76	7–6 (0–1)	
Jan 6, 2007		at Miami (OH)	L 74–83	7–7 (0–2)	
Jan 10, 2007		Buffalo	W 69–66	8–7 (1–2)	
Jan 13, 2007		No. 18 Bowling Green	L 55–64	8–8 (1–3)	
Jan 16, 2007		at Akron	W 66–55	9–8 (2–3)	
Jan 20, 2007		Western Michigan	L 55–71	9–9 (2–4)	
Jan 23, 2007		Northern Illinois	W 72–70	10–9 (3–4)	
Jan 27, 2007		at Ball State	W 77–66	11–9 (4–4)	
Feb 3, 2007		Central Michigan	W 69–65	12–9 (5–4)	
Feb 8, 2007		at Toledo	L 52–53	12–10 (5–5)	
Feb 10, 2007		at Eastern Michigan	W 70–62	13–10 (6–5)	
Feb 14, 2007		Kent State	W 75–71 ^{OT}	14–10 (7–5)	
Feb 18, 2007		Miami (OH)	W 87–74	15–10 (8–5)	
Feb 21, 2007		at Buffalo	L 47–61	15–11 (8–6)	
Feb 24, 2007		at No. 18 Bowling Green	W 70–67	16–11 (9–6)	
Feb 28, 2007		Akron	W 77–68	17–11 (10–6)	
MAC Tournament
Mar 4, 2007		Central Michigan	W 55–51	18–11	
Mar 6, 2007		vs. Eastern Michigan	L 69–79	18–12	
*Non-conference game. ^{#}Rankings from AP Poll. (#) Tournament seedings in parentheses. All times are in Eastern Time.

== Awards and honors ==
=== All-MAC Awards ===
Postseason All-MAC teams
Team	Player	Position	Year
All-MAC 2nd team	Lauren Kohn		
All-MAC 3rd team	Rachel Frederick		So.
All-MAC Freshman team	Jennifer Bushby	G	Fr.
