= Mary Evans (basketball) =

American collegiate basketball coach

Current position
- Title: Assistant coach
- Team: IU Indy
- Conference: Horizon League

Biographical details
- Education: Georgia Southern University

Playing career
- 1995–1999: Georgia Southern

Coaching career (HC unless noted)
- 2000–2001: Adams State (assistant)
- 2001–2005: Seton Hall (assistant)
- 2005–2007: USC Aiken (assistant)
- 2007–2012: Georgia Southern (assistant)
- 2012–2013: Youngstown State (assistant)
- 2013–2018: Ohio (assistant)
- 2018–2025: Valparaiso
- 2025–present: IU Indy (assistant)

Head coaching record
- Overall: 73–135

Mary Perry Evans (née Perry) is an American women's basketball coach and former basketball player who is currently an assistant at IU Indy. She was the women's basketball head coach at Valparaiso University for seven seasons.

== Early life and education ==
Evans is from Summerville, South Carolina. She attended Georgia Southern University where she played basketball and soccer and earned her bachelor's degree in 2000.

== Coaching career ==
Evans began her coaching career at Adams State in 2001. After stints at Seton Hall and USC Aiken she returned to her alma mater in 2007 as an assistant under Georgia Southern head coach Rusty Cram where she remained for five seasons. In 2012 she accepted a position as an assistant under Bob Boldon at Youngstown State. In her single year with the Penguins they won 23 games and finished second in the Horizon League. She remained on Boldon's staff at Ohio the following year when he accepted the head coaching position there. Starting in her second season at Ohio the Bobcats won back-to-back MAC regular season championships in 2015 and 2016 and won the 2015 MAC tournament.

=== Valparaiso ===
Evans was announced as Valparaiso's head coach on April 13, 2018, where she has a 73–135 overall record in seven seasons. She parted-ways with the program after the 2024–25 season.

== Head coaching record ==
Record table
Season	Team	Overall	Conference	Standing	Postseason
Valparaiso (MVC) (2018–2025)
2018–19	Valparaiso	8–24	3–15	9th	
2019–20	Valparaiso	17–12	9–9	6th	
2020–21	Valparaiso	12–13	7–9	7th	
2021–22	Valparaiso	11–19	9–9	T–6th	
2022–23	Valparaiso	7–23	5–15	11th	
2023–24	Valparaiso	5–25	4–16	10th	
2024–25	Valparaiso	13–19	9–11	8th	
Valparaiso:		73–135 (.351)	46–84 (.354)		
Total:		73–135 (.351)			
National champion Postseason invitational champion Conference regular season champion Conference regular season and conference tournament champion Division regular season champion Division regular season and conference tournament champion Conference tournament champion

== Career statistics ==
Year	Team	GP	GS	MPG	FG%	3P%	FT%	RPG	APG	SPG	BPG	TO	PPG
1987–88	Coastal Carolina	26	-	-	40.5	0.0	68.3	7.1	0.8	1.1	0.8	-	13.2
1989–90	Coastal Carolina	28	-	-	43.9	37.5	53.4	6.1	1.0	0.8	0.9	-	11.1
Career		54	-	-	42.1	37.5	62.1	6.6	0.9	0.9	0.9	-	12.1
Statistics retrieved from Sports-Reference.

== Personal life ==
Evans and her husband Daryl have two children named Keegan Thomas and Zoe Mae
