= 2014–15 Mid-American Conference women's basketball season =

- League: NCAA Division I
- Sport: Basketball
- Teams: 12

Regular season
- Champions: Ohio
- Runners-up: Central Michigan
- Season MVP: Sina King

Tournament
- Champions: Ohio
- Runners-up: Eastern Michigan
- Finals MVP: Kiyanna Black

Mid-American women's basketball seasons
- ← 2013–14 2015–16 →

2014–15 Mid-American Conference women's basketball standings
	Conf.				Overall
Team	W		L	PCT	W		L	PCT
Ohio†	16	–	2	.889	27	–	5	.844
Akron	12	–	6	.667	22	–	8	.733
Buffalo	11	–	7	.611	19	–	12	.613
Miami (OH)	4	–	14	.222	7	–	23	.233
Kent State	3	–	15	.167	5	–	25	.167
Bowling Green	2	–	16	.111	9	–	21	.300
West
Ball State	13	–	5	.722	17	–	13	.567
Eastern Michigan	11	–	7	.611	22	–	13	.629
Western Michigan	11	–	7	.611	20	–	12	.625
Toledo	10	–	8	.556	18	–	13	.581
Northern Illinois	8	–	10	.444	12	–	17	.414
Central Michigan	7	–	11	.389	13	–	18	.419
† 2015 MAC tournament winner As of 14 March 2015; Rankings from AP poll

The 2014–15 Mid-American Conference women's basketball season began with practices in October 2014, followed by the start of the 2014–15 NCAA Division I women's basketball season in November. Conference play began in January 2015 and concluded in March 2015. Ohio won the regular season title with a record of 16–2 by three games over Ball State. Sina King of Akron was named MAC player of the year.

Ohio won the MAC tournament by beating sixth-seeded Eastern Michigan 60–44 in the final. They lost to Arizona State in the first round NCAA tournament. Eastern Michigan, Ball State, Akron, Buffalo, Toledo, and Western Michigan all qualified for the WNIT.

== Preseason awards ==
The preseason coaches' poll and league awards were announced by the league office on October 29, 2014.

=== Preseason women's basketball coaches poll ===
(First place votes in parentheses)

==== East Division ====
1. Buffalo (8)
2. Bowling Green (3)
3. Akron
4. Ohio (1)
5. Miami
6. Kent State

==== West Division ====
1. Central Michigan (11)
2. Ball State (1)
3. Western Michigan
4. Toledo
5. Eastern Michigan
6. Northern Illinois

==== Tournament champs ====
Central Michigan (10), Ball State (1), Buffalo (1)

=== Honors ===
Honor	Recipient
Preseason All-MAC East	Sina King, Akron
Preseason All-MAC East	Erica Donovan, Bowling Green
Preseason All-MAC East	Mackenzie Loesing, Buffalo
Preseason All-MAC East	Kristen Sharkey, Buffalo
Preseason All-MAC East	Kiyanna Black, Ohio
Preseason All-MAC West	Nathalie Fontaine, Ball State
Preseason All-MAC West	Crystal Bradford, Central Michigan
Preseason All-MAC West	Cha Sweeney, Eastern Michigan
Preseason All-MAC West	Inma Zanoguera, Toledo
Preseason All-MAC West	Miracle Woods, Western Michigan

== Postseason ==
=== Postseason awards ===
1. Coach of the Year: Bob Boldon, Ohio
2. Player of the Year: Sina King, Akron
3. Freshman of the Year: Jay-Ann Bravo Harriott, Toledo
4. Defensive Player of the Year: Christa Baccas, Buffalo
5. Sixth Man of the Year: Mackenzie Loesing, Buffalo

=== Honors ===
Honor	Recipient
Postseason All-MAC First Team	Sina King, Akron, F
Postseason All-MAC First Team	Nathalie Fontaine, Ball State, F
Postseason All-MAC First Team	Amanda Corral, Northern Illinois, G
Postseason All-MAC First Team	Kiyanna Black, Ohio, G
Postseason All-MAC First Team	Inma Zanoguera, Toledo, G
Postseason All-MAC Second Team	Anita Brown, Akron, G
Postseason All-MAC Second Team	Kristen Sharkey, Buffalo, F
Postseason All-MAC Second Team	Crystal Bradford, Central Michigan, G/F
Postseason All-MAC Second Team	Cha Sweeney, Eastern Michigan, G
Postseason All-MAC Second Team	Miracle Woods, Western Michigan, F/C
Postseason All-MAC Third Team	Hannah Plybon, Akron, G
Postseason All-MAC Third Team	Jill Morrison, Ball State, G
Postseason All-MAC Third Team	Mackenzie Loesing, Buffalo, G
Postseason All-MAC Third Team	CiCi Shannon, Kent State, C
Postseason All-MAC Third Team	Quiera Lampkins, Ohio, F
Postseason All-MAC Honorable Mention	Deborah Hoekstra, Bowling Green, G
Postseason All-MAC Honorable Mention	Christa Baccas, Buffalo, C/F
Postseason All-MAC Honorable Mention	Da’Jourie Turner, Central Michigan, G
Postseason All-MAC Honorable Mention	Mariah Byard, Ohio, G
Postseason All-MAC Honorable Mention	Brenae Harris, Toledo, G
All-MAC Freshman Team	Kerri McMahan, Akron, G
All-MAC Freshman Team	Moriah Monaco, Ball State, G
All-MAC Freshman Team	Baleigh Reid, Miami, G
All-MAC Freshman Team	Kelly Smith, Northern Illinois, F
All-MAC Freshman Team	Jay-Ann Bravo-Harriott, Toledo, G

== See also ==
2014–15 Mid-American Conference men's basketball season
