= Kate Bruce (basketball) =

American collegiate basketball coach

Current position
- Title: Head coach
- Team: IU Indy
- Conference: Horizon League
- Record: 47–74 (.388)

Biographical details
- Education: Florida Gulf Coast University

Playing career
- 2005–2007: Florida Gulf Coast
- 2007–2008: Perrik Jumpers

Coaching career (HC unless noted)
- 2008–2009: Florida Gulf Coast (graduate assistant)
- 2009–2010: Florida Gulf Coast (assistant)
- 2010–2013: Youngstown State (assistant)
- 2013–2016: Ohio (assistant)
- 2016–2022: Walsh
- 2022–present: IU Indy

Head coaching record
- Overall: 181–117 (.607)

Kate Bruce (née Schrader) is an American women's basketball coach and former basketball player who has been the women's basketball head coach at IU Indy since 2022. She was the women's basketball head coach at Walsh for six seasons.

== Early life and education ==
From Fort Collins, Colorado, Bruce attended Florida Gulf Coast University where she played basketball. In 2007 she was an NCAA Division II All-American and helped the Eagles to 2007 NCAA Division II women's basketball tournament national final. While playing just two seasons she became the program's all-time leading scorer. She was inducted into the FGCU Athletics in 2023. She played professionally for one season in the Netherlands.

== Coaching career ==
Bruce began her coaching career as a graduate assistant at her alma mater under her former coach Karl Smesko in 2008 before being promoted to assistant coach the following season. In 2010 she was hired as an assistant by Bob Boldon at Youngstown State for three seasons. In 2013, She followed Boldon to Ohio. In her three seasons as an assistant there the Bobcats won back-to-back MAC regular season championships in 2015 and 2016 and won the 2015 MAC tournament.

=== Walsh ===
On September 20, 2016, she was named the head coach at Walsh University. She led the Cavaliers to a 134–43 record over six seasons and went to four straight NCAA Division II tournaments. In her final season she led them to the sweet 16 in the 2022 NCAA Division II women's basketball tournament.

=== IU Indy ===
On May 12, 2022, she was named the head coach at Indiana University Indianapolis. In three seasons she has led the Jaguars to a 33–57 overall record.

== Head coaching record ==
Record table
Season	Team	Overall	Conference	Standing	Postseason
Walsh (GLIAC) (2016–2017)
2016–17	Walsh	15–13	11–9	8th	
Walsh (G-MAC) (2017–2022)
2017–18	Walsh	21–9	17–5	T-2nd	
2018–19	Walsh	25–7	18–4	T-1st	
2019–20	Walsh	28–2	18–0	1st	
2020–21	Walsh	17–7	16–5	3rd	
2021–22	Walsh	28–5	20–2	2nd	
Walsh:		134–43 (.757)	100–25 (.800)		
IUPUI/IU Indy (Horizon League) (2022–present)
2022–23	IUPUI	17–13	13–7	T-3rd	
2023–24	IUPUI	7–23	5–15	10th	
2024–25	IU Indy	9–21	8–12	T-5th	
2025–26	IU Indy	14–17	9–11	7th	
IUPUI/IU Indy:		47–74 (.388)	35–45 (.438)		
Total:		181–117 (.607)			
National champion Postseason invitational champion Conference regular season champion Conference regular season and conference tournament champion Division regular season champion Division regular season and conference tournament champion Conference tournament champion

== Personal life ==
She and her husband, Jesse, have three children named Brenna, Laney and Evan.
