= 2005–06 Ohio Bobcats women's basketball team =

Intercollegiate basketball season

2005–06 Ohio Bobcats women's basketball
- Conference: Mid-American Conference
- East Division
- Record: 9–20 (5–11 MAC)
- Head coach: Lynn Bria (7th season)
- Home arena: Convocation Center

2005–06 Mid-American Conference women's basketball standings
	Conf.				Overall
Team	W		L	PCT	W		L	PCT
No. 23 Bowling Green †	16	–	0	1.000	28	–	2	.933
Kent State	12	–	4	.750	21	–	9	.700
Buffalo	5	–	11	.313	10	–	18	.357
Ohio	5	–	11	.313	9	–	20	.310
Miami (OH)	3	–	12	.200	8	–	20	.286
Akron	1	–	14	.067	5	–	23	.179
West
Eastern Michigan	15	–	1	.938	22	–	7	.759
Western Michigan	11	–	5	.688	13	–	14	.481
Ball State	9	–	7	.563	17	–	12	.586
Central Michigan	7	–	9	.438	16	–	12	.571
Northern Illinois	7	–	9	.438	12	–	17	.414
Toledo	4	–	12	.250	11	–	18	.379
† 2006 MAC tournament winner Rankings from AP poll

The 2005–06 Ohio Bobcats women's basketball team represented Ohio University during the 2005–06 NCAA Division I women's basketball season. The Bobcats, led by seventh year head coach Lynn Bria, in her final year, played their home games at the Convocation Center in Athens, Ohio as a member of the Mid-American Conference. They finished the season 9–20 and 5–11 in MAC play.

== Preseason ==
The preseason poll was announced by the league office on October 26, 2005. Ohio was picked fourth in the MAC East.

=== Preseason women's basketball poll ===
(First place votes in parentheses)

==== East Division ====
1. Bowling Green (17) 132
2. Kent State (6) 117
3. Miami 93
4. Ohio 68
5. Buffalo 40
6. Akron 33

==== West Division ====
1. Eastern Michigan (20) 132
2. Western Michigan (3) 99
3. Ball State 86
4. Toledo 83
5. Northern Illinois 44
6. Central Michigan 39

==== Tournament Champion ====
Bowling Green (15), Kent State (5), Eastern Michigan (4), Western Michigan (1)

== Schedule ==
Date time, TV	Rank^{#}	Opponent^{#}	Result	Record	Site (attendance) city, state
Non-conference regular season
Nov 18, 2005*		at South Carolina State	L 68–80	0–1	
Nov 19, 2005*		Tennessee State	W 74–69	1–1	
Nov 22, 2005*		Youngstown State	L 59–69	1–2	
Nov 25, 2005*		at East Carolina	L 68–71 ^{OT}	1–3	
Nov 26, 2005*		at UNC Greensboro	L 52–69	1–4	
Dec 3, 2005*		Western Illinois	L 59–69	1–5	
Dec 12, 2005*		Chicago State	W 65–57	2–5	
Dec 15, 2005*		at South Carolina	L 49–77	2–6	
Dec 18, 2005*		at UNC Wilmington	L 55–60	2–7	
Dec 22, 2005*		at Cleveland State	W 76–64	3–7	
Dec 30, 2005*		Duquesne	L 79–82 ^{OT}	3–8	
MAC regular season
Jan 8, 2006		Kent State	L 73–83	3–9 (0–1)	
Jan 11, 2006		Miami (OH)	W 56–43	4–9 (1–1)	
Jan 14, 2006		at Buffalo	W 72–62	5–9 (2–1)	
Jan 18, 2006		at Bowling Green	L 63–77	5–10 (2–2)	
Jan 21, 2006		Akron	W 63–55	6–10 (3–2)	
Jan 25, 2006		at Western Michigan	L 77–88	6–11 (3–3)	
Jan 28, 2006		at Northern Illinois	W 74–62	7–11 (4–3)	
Jan 31, 2006		Ball State	L 63–80	7–12 (4–4)	
Feb 4, 2006		at Central Michigan	L 48–64	7–13 (4–5)	
Feb 8, 2006		Eastern Michigan	L 56–62	7–14 (4–6)	
Feb 11, 2006		Toledo	L 49–81	7–15 (4–7)	
Feb 15, 2006		at Kent State	L 66–73 ^{OT}	7–16 (4–8)	
Feb 18, 2006		at Miami (OH)	L 56–60	7–17 (4–9)	
Feb 21, 2006		Buffalo	L 77–84	7–18 (4–10)	
Feb 25, 2006		Bowling Green	L 61–65	7–19 (4–11)	
Feb 28, 2006		at Akron	W 66–56	8–19 (5–11)	
MAC Tournament
Mar 4, 2006		Central Michigan	W 74–57	9–19	
Mar 8, 2006		vs. Eastern Michigan	L 66–76	9–20	
*Non-conference game. ^{#}Rankings from AP Poll. (#) Tournament seedings in parentheses. All times are in Eastern Time.

== Awards and honors ==
=== All-MAC Awards ===
Postseason All-MAC teams
Team	Player	Position	Year
All-MAC Honorable Mention	Simone Redd		So.
All-MAC Honorable Mention	Rachel Frederick		Fr.
All-MAC Freshman team	Rachel Frederick		Fr.
