= 2002 MAC women's basketball tournament =

- Classification: Division I
- Teams: 13
- Site: Gund Arena; Cleveland, Ohio
- Champions: Kent State
- Winning coach: Bob Lindsay
- MVP: Andrea Csaszar (Kent State)
- MAC women's basketball tournaments

2001–02 Mid-American Conference women's basketball standings
	Conf.				Overall
Team	W		L	PCT	W		L	PCT
Kent State †	13	–	3	.813	20	–	10	.667
Miami (OH)	11	–	5	.688	19	–	11	.633
Ohio	7	–	9	.438	13	–	16	.448
Bowling Green	6	–	10	.375	8	–	19	.296
Marshall	5	–	11	.313	8	–	19	.296
Buffalo	4	–	12	.250	9	–	18	.333
Akron	0	–	16	.000	1	–	27	.036
West
Ball State	13	–	3	.813	23	–	7	.767
Toledo	12	–	4	.750	17	–	11	.607
Western Michigan	11	–	5	.688	16	–	13	.552
Eastern Michigan	10	–	6	.625	16	–	11	.593
Northern Illinois	10	–	6	.625	17	–	12	.586
Central Michigan	2	–	14	.125	9	–	18	.333
† 2002 MAC tournament winner Rankings from AP poll

The 2002 Mid-American Conference women's basketball tournament was the post-season basketball tournament for the Mid-American Conference (MAC) 2001–02 college basketball season. The 2002 tournament was held March 2–9, 2002. Top-seeded Kent State won the championship over Ball State. Andrea Csaszar of Kent State was the MVP.

== Format ==
The top three seeds received byes into the quarterfinals. The first round was played at campus sites. All other rounds were held at Gund Arena.

== Bracket ==
First round March 2, 2003
8	Ohio	74
9	Bowling Green	68
4	Miami	80
13	Akron	60
5	Western Michigan	77
12	Central Michigan	67
7	Eastern Michigan	68
10	Marshall	49
6	Northern Illinois	72
11	Buffalo	41

Quarterfinals; March 6, 2003
1	Kent State	83
8	Ohio	63
4	Miami	77
5	Western Michigan	70
2	Ball State	83
7	Eastern Michigan	57
3	Toledo	48
6	Northern Illinois	58

Semifinals; March 8, 2003
1	Kent State	74
4	Miami	50
2	Ball State	77
6	Northern Illinois	59

Championship; March 9, 2003
1	Kent State	73
2	Ball State	59

== All-Tournament Team ==
Tournament MVP – Casey Rost, Western Michigan

Player	Team
Andrea Csaszar	Kent State
Valerie Zona	Kent State
Kate Miller	Kent State
Tamara Bowie	Ball State
Jennifer Youngblood	Northern Illinois
