= List of Ohio Bobcats women's basketball head coaches =

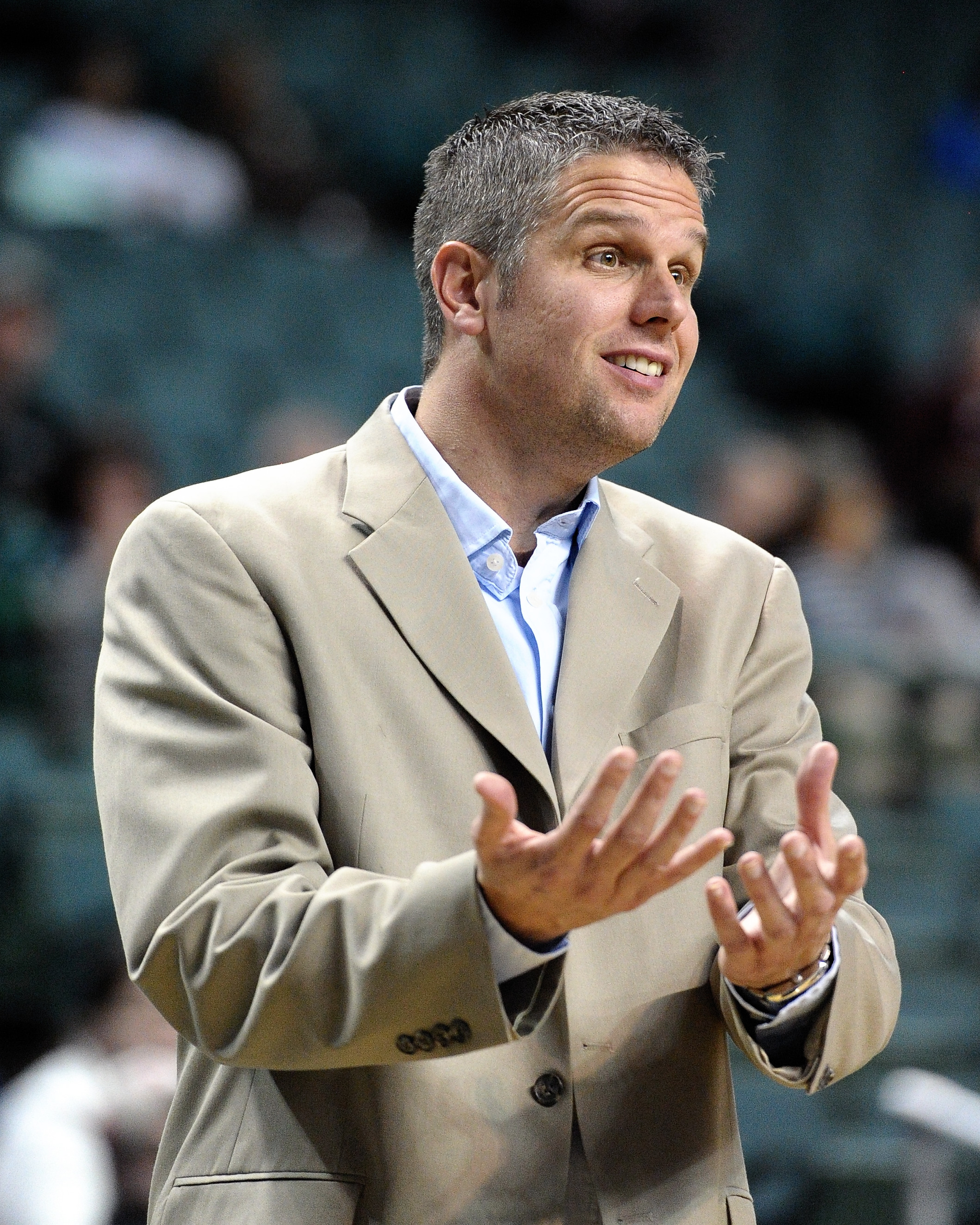
Bob Boldon is the current and all-time winningest head coach of the Ohio Bobcats.

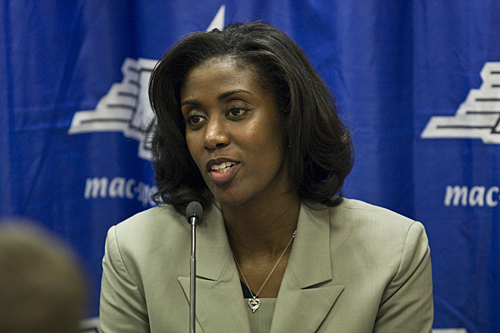
Sylvia Crawley coached Ohio for two seasons. She is the school's leader in win percentage.

This is a list of Ohio Bobcats women's basketball head coaches

Head coach	Period	W–L Record	Win %
Nancy Schaub	1973–1977	33–29	.532
Kathy Martin	1977–1978	5–8	.385
Gwen Hoover	1978–1981	27–40	.403
Becky DeStefano	1981–1984	38–43	.469
Amy Prichard	1984–1990	74–91	.448
Marsha Reall	1990–1999	123–126	.494
Lynn Bria	1999–2006	77–123	.385
Sylvia Crawley	2006–2008	38–25	.603
Semeka Randall	2008–2013	50–103	.327
Bob Boldon	2013–present	224–178	.557
TOTALS	1973–present	689–767	.473

Through 11/14/2026 Source: Ohio Basketball Media Guide
