= 2014–15 Ohio Bobcats women's basketball team =

Intercollegiate basketball season

2014–15 Ohio Bobcats women's basketball

MAC Regular Season Champions MAC Tournament Champions

NCAA Women's Tournament, 1st Round
- Conference: Mid-American Conference
- East Division
- Record: 27–5 (16–2 MAC)
- Head coach: Bob Boldon (2nd season)
- Assistant coaches: Kate Bruce; Tavares Jackson; Mary Evans
- Home arena: Convocation Center

2014–15 Mid-American Conference women's basketball standings
	Conf.				Overall
Team	W		L	PCT	W		L	PCT
Ohio†	16	–	2	.889	27	–	5	.844
Akron	12	–	6	.667	22	–	8	.733
Buffalo	11	–	7	.611	19	–	12	.613
Miami (OH)	4	–	14	.222	7	–	23	.233
Kent State	3	–	15	.167	5	–	25	.167
Bowling Green	2	–	16	.111	9	–	21	.300
West
Ball State	13	–	5	.722	17	–	13	.567
Eastern Michigan	11	–	7	.611	22	–	13	.629
Western Michigan	11	–	7	.611	20	–	12	.625
Toledo	10	–	8	.556	18	–	13	.581
Northern Illinois	8	–	10	.444	12	–	17	.414
Central Michigan	7	–	11	.389	13	–	18	.419
† 2015 MAC tournament winner As of 14 March 2015; Rankings from AP poll

The 2014–15 Ohio Bobcats women's basketball team represented Ohio University during the 2014–15 NCAA Division I women's basketball season. The Bobcats, led by second-year head coach Bob Boldon, played their home games at the Convocation Center in Athens, Ohio as a member of the Mid-American Conference. They finished the season 27–5 and 16–2 in MAC play. After winning the MAC regular season and beating sixth-seeded Eastern Michigan 60–44 in the MAC tournament final, the team was invited to the 2015 NCAA women's tournament, where they lost to Arizona State in the first round.

== Preseason ==
The preseason coaches' poll and league awards were announced by the league office on October 29, 2014. Ohio was picked fourth in the MAC East.

=== Preseason women's basketball coaches poll ===
(First place votes in parentheses)

==== East Division ====
1. Buffalo (8)
2. Bowling Green (3)
3. Akron
4. Ohio (1)
5. Miami
6. Kent State

==== West Division ====
1. Central Michigan (11)
2. Ball State (1)
3. Western Michigan
4. Toledo
5. Eastern Michigan
6. Northern Illinois

==== Tournament champs ====
Central Michigan (10), Ball State (1), Buffalo (1)

=== Preseason All-MAC ===
Preseason All-MAC teams
Team	Player	Position	Year
Preseason All-MAC East	Kiyanna Black	G	Jr.

== Roster ==
2015–16 Ohio Bobcats women's basketball team
Players
Coaches

Pos.	#	Name	Height	Year	Hometown
G	1	Mariah Harris	5 ft 11 in (1.8 m)	RS Jr	Springfield, OH
G	2	Mariah Byard	5 ft 10 in (1.78 m)	Sr	Mannington, WV
G	4	Kiyanna Black	5 ft 5 in (1.65 m)	Jr	Columbus, OH
G	5	Quiera Lampkins	5 ft 9 in (1.75 m)	So	Gahanna, OH
G	7	Adyn Bucher	—	So	Athens, OH
F	10	Lexie Baldwin	6 ft 1 in (1.85 m)	Jr	Hattiesburg, MS
F	11	Kelly Karlis	6 ft 2 in (1.88 m)	Fr	Medinah, IL
G	12	Yamonie Jenkins	5 ft 7 in (1.7 m)	So	Reynoldsburg, OH
G	14	Kat Yelle	5 ft 7 in (1.7 m)	RS Jr	Geneva, IL
F	15	Jasmine Weatherspoon	6 ft 2 in (1.88 m)	So	Columbus, OH
F	20	Tmisht Stinson	5 ft 10 in (1.78 m)	So	Hattiesburg, MS
F	22	Hannah Boesinger	5 ft 11 in (1.8 m)	So	Hudson, OH
F	42	Destini Cooper	6 ft 1 in (1.85 m)	So	Reynoldsburg, OH

Head coach

- Bob Boldon

Assistant coach(es)

- Katie Bruce
- Tavares Jackson
- Mary Evans

Legend

- (C) Team captain
- (S) Suspended
- (I) Ineligible
- (W) Walk-on
- Injured
- Current redshirt

Roster
Last update: May 29, 2016

== Schedule and results ==
Date time, TV	Rank^{#}	Opponent^{#}	Result	Record	Site (attendance) city, state
Non-conference regular season
November 14, 2014*		at Murray State	W 111–60	1–0	
November 17, 2014*		Wofford	W 84–37	2–0	
November 20, 2014*		Detroit	W 60–57	3–0	
November 25, 2014*		at Northern Kentucky	W 77–38	4–0	
November 30, 2014*		Manhattan	W 82–58	5–0	
December 3, 2014*		Morehead State	W 87–67	6–0	
December 6, 2014*		East Carolina	L 68–76	6–1	
December 15, 2014*		James Madison	L 62–69	6–2	
December 19, 2014*		vs. La Salle	W 74–63	7–2	
December 20, 2014*		vs. Massachusetts	W 59–52	8–2	
December 29, 2014*		Cleveland State	W 71–64	9–2	
MAC regular season
January 3, 2015		at Buffalo	W 61–50	10–2 (1-0)	
January 7, 2015		at Western Michigan	L 51–61	10–3 (1-1)	
January 10, 2015		Toledo	W 65–58	11–3 (2-1)	
January 14, 2015		at Eastern Michigan	W 82–59	12–3 (3-1)	
January 17, 2015		Central Michigan	W 71–51	13–3 (4-1)	
January 21, 2015		Northern Illinois	W 67–40	14–3 (5-1)	
January 24, 2015		at Ball State	W 60–53	15–3 (6-1)	
January 28, 2015		Akron	W 72–60	16–3 (7-1)	
January 31, 2015		at Central Michigan	W 74–66	17–3 (8-1)	
February 7, 2015		Kent State	W 58–44	18–2 (9-1)	
February 11, 2015		at Bowling Green	W 71–46	19–3 (10-1)	
February 14, 2015		at Miami (OH)	W 67–45	20–3 (11-1)	
February 18, 2015		Eastern Michigan	L 61–73	20–4 (11-2)	
February 21, 2015		Akron	W 77–55	21–4 (12-2)	
February 25, 2015		Buffalo	W 78–70	22–4 (13-2)	
February 28, 2015		Bowling Green	W 67–47	23–4 (14-2)	
March 4, 2015		Kent State	W 69–56	24–4 (15-2)	
March 7, 2015		Miami (OH)	W 75–60	25–4 (16-2)	
MAC Tournament
March 13, 2015		vs. Buffalo	W 63–55	26–4	
March 14, 2015		vs. Eastern Michigan	W 60–44	27–4	
NCAA tournament
March 21, 2015		vs. Arizona State	L 55–74	27–5	
*Non-conference game. ^{#}Rankings from AP Poll. (#) Tournament seedings in parentheses. All times are in Eastern.

== Awards and honors ==
=== Weekly awards ===
Weekly award honors
Honors	Player	Position	Date awarded	Source
MAC East Player of the Week	Quiera Lampkins	G	December 22	
MAC East Player of the Week	Kiyanna Black	G	February 2	
MAC East Player of the Week	Kiyanna Black	G	February 23	
MAC East Player of the Week	Kiyanna Black	G	March 22	

=== All-MAC awards ===
Postseason All-MAC teams
Team	Player	Position	Year
MAC Coach of the Year	Bob Boldon		
All-MAC 1st Team	Kiyanna Black	G	Jr.
All-MAC 3rd Team	Quiera Lampkins	G	So.
All-MAC Honorable Mention	Mariah Byard	G	Sr.

== See also ==
- 2014–15 Ohio Bobcats men's basketball team
