= Tamara Bowie =

American basketball player

Personal information
- Born: June 3, 1981 (age 45)
- Listed height: 183 cm (6 ft 0 in)
- Listed weight: 75 kg (165 lb)

Career information
- College: Ball State (1999–2003)
- WNBA draft: 2003: 3rd round, 36th overall pick
- Drafted by: Washington Mystics
- Position: Forward

Career history
- 2003: Washington Mystics
- 2006–2007: Grindavík
- 2007–2008: Hapoel Tel Aviv
- 2010–2011: WBC Neftokhimik Burgas

Career highlights
- Bulgarian League champion (2011); Úrvalsdeild Foreign Player of the Year (2007); Icelandic League All-Star (2007); Úrvalsdeild scoring champion (2007); Úrvalsdeild rebounds leader (2007); 2× MAC Player of the Year (2002, 2003); 3× First-team All-MAC (2001–2003); MAC All-Freshman Team (2000)
- Stats at Basketball Reference

Tamara Bowie (born June 3, 1981) is an American former professional basketball player. In 2007, she was named the Úrvalsdeild kvenna Foreign Player of the Year after leading the league in scoring and rebounds. She played professionally in Iceland, Latvia, Israel, Greece and Bulgaria, where she won the national championship in 2011.

== College career ==
Bowie played college basketball for the Ball State Cardinals from 1999 to 2003. She left the school as its all-time leading scorer with 2,091 career points, which ranks seventh all-time in Mid-American Conference history, and set the Ball State single-season scoring record with 618 points in the 2002–03 season. She was named the MAC Player of the Year recipient (2001–02 and 2002–03) becoming the only Cardinal to win the award multiple times. She was named Kodak/WBCA Honorable Mention All-America three times during her career.

=== Ball State statistics ===
Legend
GP	Games played	GS	Games started	MPG	Minutes per game
FG%	Field goal percentage	3P%	3-point field goal percentage	FT%	Free throw percentage
RPG	Rebounds per game	APG	Assists per game	SPG	Steals per game
BPG	Blocks per game	PPG	Points per game	**Bold**	Career high

Year	Team	GP	Points	FG%	3P%	FT%	RPG	APG	SPG	BPG	PPG
1999–00	Ball State	29	432	50.5%	37.8%	68.3%	7.4	1.4	1.6	1.3	14.9
2000–01	Ball State	28	512	**58.4%**	29.8%	78.3%	8.4	1.4	1.4	0.9	18.3
2001–02	Ball State	**32**	530	55.0%	32.3%	69.3%	7.2	1.5	1.7	1.0	16.6
2002–03	Ball State	30	**618**	55.8%	**47.5%**	**80.0%**	**8.4**	**2.6**	**1.8**	**1.9**	**20.6**
Career		119	2092	55.0%	36.6%	74.5%	7.8	1.7	1.6	1.3	17.6

== Professional career ==
Bowie signed with Grindavík in September 2006. On January 13, she participated in the Icelandic All-Star game, scoring 12 points. On January 17, 2007, she scored 36 points and grabbed a season high 27 rebounds in a victory against Keflavík. She left Grindavík for personal reasons in the playoffs after averaging 31.7 points in the first three games of Grindavík's best-of-five semi-finals series against Keflavík. After the season she was named the Úrvalsdeild Foreign Player of the Year. For the season she led the league in both scoring and rebounds with 30.5 points and 14.8 rebounds per game.

She spent the 2007–08 season with Hapoel Tel Aviv, averaging 24.9 points and 12.5 rebounds per game. In March 2008, she signed as a free agent with the Minnesota Lynx but did not end making the opening day roster.

She played with WBC Neftokhimik Burgas during the 2010–11 season, helping the team win the Bulgarian Women's Basketball Championship.
