= Mid-American Conference Tournament =

Mid-American Conference Championship or Mid-American Conference Tournament may refer to:

- MAC Championship Game, the college football championship
- Mid-American Conference men's basketball tournament, the men's basketball championship tournament
- Mid-American Conference women's basketball tournament, the women's basketball championship tournament
