= Mid-American Conference basketball tournament =

The phrase Mid-American Conference basketball tournament may refer to:

- Mid-American Conference men's basketball tournament
- Mid-American Conference women's basketball tournament
