= Ball State Cardinals basketball =

Ball State Cardinals basketball may refer to either of the basketball teams that represent Ball State University:

- Ball State Cardinals men's basketball
- Ball State Cardinals women's basketball
