= Kent State Golden Flashes basketball =

Kent State Golden Flashes basketball may refer to either of the basketball teams that represent Kent State University:

- Kent State Golden Flashes men's basketball
- Kent State Golden Flashes women's basketball
