= Mid-American Conference women's basketball tournament =

Postseason single-elimination tournament

- Conference basketball championship
- Sport: Basketball
- Conference: Mid-American Conference
- Number of teams: 8
- Format: Single-elimination tournament
- Current stadium: Rocket Arena
- Current location: Cleveland, Ohio
- Played: 1982–present
- Last contest: 2026
- Current champion: Miami RedHawks
- Most championships: Bowling Green Falcons (11)
- Official website: getsomemaction.com – Women's Basketball

The Mid-American Conference women's basketball tournament is the postseason single-elimination tournament for the NCAA Division I Mid-American Conference (MAC). The winner of the tournament receives the MAC's automatic bid to the NCAA Division I women's basketball tournament. As of the next MAC tournament in 2021, the top eight teams in conference play will qualify for the tournament. The tournament final (among other rounds) has been held in Cleveland since 2000, starting with Public Hall before moving to Rocket Arena in 2001 to match the men's basketball tournament, where it has been since.

== Format ==
On May 12, 2020, the MAC announced a series of changes to its competitive format in multiple sports in response to fallout from the COVID-19 pandemic; these changes took effect in the 2020–21 school year and will remain in place through at least 2023–24. With respect to men's and women's basketball, the MAC abandoned its divisional format for a single league table, increased the conference schedule from 18 to 20 games, and reduced the conference tournament field to 8. All qualifying teams will continue to play at Rocket Arena in Cleveland, and the men's and women's tournaments will continue to run concurrently.

Through the 2020 edition, canceled in progress due to COVID-19, the tournament involved all 12 conference members. In 2019 and 2020, the top four seeds received byes into the quarterfinals; all other teams started play in the first round at campus sites. The survivors of these games joined the top four seeds in Cleveland for the remainder of the tournament. This structure was used in the MAC men's tournament from 2016 to 2020.

From 2012 to 2018, the No. 1 and 2 seeds earned a "double-bye" to the semifinals, with the No. 3 and 4 seeds beginning tournament play in the quarterfinals. Teams seeded 5–12 had to play an additional two rounds, beginning with campus-site games in the first round. All other games were at the venue now known as Rocket Arena, which has served as the regular host for the men's tournament since 2000. When the MAC adopted this format, it abandoned a former practice of awarding the top two seeds to its divisional winners. Teams were (and still are) seeded based on conference record, regardless of their place in their division — though no division champion was seeded lower than fourth.

In the previous tournament format, teams were seeded per division by conference record using a series of specified tiebreakers when necessary. The top two seeds in each division received byes into the quarterfinals.

Starting in 2021 only the top eight teams qualify and the entire tournament has been played in Cleveland.

== Yearly results ==
From 2006 to 2009, the tournament was seeded per division (West, East) by conference record.

Year	Champion	Score	Runner-up	Tournament MVP	Location
1982	(1) Miami	58–56	(3) Northern Illinois	none	Irving Gymnasium
1983	(3) Central Michigan	78–73	(1) Miami	none	Millett Hall
1984	(1) Central Michigan	71–65	(3) Toledo	Latanga Cox, Central Michigan	Rockford MetroCentre
1985	(2) Western Michigan	73–63	(1) Central Michigan	Tracy Wells, Western Michigan	Centennial Hall
1986	(1) Ohio	92–85 (OT)	(3) Central Michigan	Caroline Mast, Ohio	Rockford MetroCentre
1987	(1) Bowling Green	63–62	(2) Central Michigan	Stephanie Coe, Bowling Green	Centennial Hall
1988	(1) Bowling Green	70–53	(2) Western Michigan	Jackie Motycka, Bowling Green	Centennial Hall (first round on-campus)
1989	(1) Bowling Green	90–51	(2) Toledo	Paulette Backstrom, Bowling Green	Centennial Hall (first round on-campus)
1990	(3) Bowling Green	84–63	(1) Miami	Angie Bonner, Bowling Green	Cobo Arena (first round on-campus)
1991	(1) Toledo	93–66	(2) Central Michigan	Dana Drew, Toledo	Cobo Arena (first round on-campus)
1992	(1) Toledo	78–57	(3) Kent State	Dana Drew, Toledo	Cobo Arena (first round on-campus)
1993	(1) Bowling Green	96–68	(3) Kent State	Lori Albers, Bowling Green	Battelle Hall (first round on-campus)
1994	(1) Bowling Green	74–63	(2) Toledo	Michelle Shade, Bowling Green	Battelle Hall (first round on-campus)
1995	(2) Toledo	79–65 (OT)	(4) Miami	Angela Drake, Toledo; Dana Drew, Toledo	Savage Hall (first round on-campus)
1996	(2) Toledo	73–66	(1) Kent State	Mimi Olson, Toledo	SeaGate Centre (first round on-campus)
1997	(1) Toledo	88–64	(2) Kent State	Mimi Olson, Toledo	SeaGate Centre (first round on-campus)
1998	(1) Kent State	64–56	(3) Toledo	Dawn Zerman, Kent State	SeaGate Centre (first round on-campus)
1999	(1) Toledo	65–50	(2) Kent State	Kim Knuth, Toledo	SeaGate Centre (first round on-campus)
2000	(1) Kent State	74–60	(3) Toledo	Julie Studer, Kent State	Public Auditorium (first round on-campus)
2001	(1) Toledo	74–65 (OT)	(2) Kent State	Kahli Carter, Toledo	Gund Arena (first round on-campus)
2002	(1) Kent State	73–59	(2) Ball State	Andrea Csaszar, Kent State	Gund Arena (first round on-campus)
2003	(4) Western Michigan	81–76	(3) Ball State	Casey Rost, Western Michigan	Gund Arena (first round on-campus)
2004	(2) Eastern Michigan	65–56	(4) Bowling Green	Ryan Coleman, Eastern Michigan	Gund Arena (first round on-campus)
2005	(1) Bowling Green	81–75	(2) Kent State	Kate Achter, Bowling Green	Gund Arena (first round on-campus)
2006	(1E) Bowling Green	64–38	(2E) Kent State	Ali Mann, Bowling Green	Quicken Loans Arena (first round on-campus)
2007	(1E) Bowling Green	67–53	(1W) Ball State	Carin Horne, Bowling Green	Quicken Loans Arena
2008	(2E) Miami	67–56	(3E) Ohio	Amanda Jackson, Miami	Quicken Loans Arena
2009	(1W) Ball State	55–51	(1E) Bowling Green	Tracy Pontius, Bowling Green	Quicken Loans Arena
2010	(1) Bowling Green	62–53	(2) Toledo	Lauren Prochaska, Bowling Green	Quicken Loans Arena (first round on-campus)
2011	(2) Bowling Green	51–46	(5) Eastern Michigan	Lauren Prochaska, Bowling Green	Quicken Loans Arena (first round on-campus)
2012	(3) Eastern Michigan	72–71	(5) Central Michigan	Tavelyn James, Eastern Michigan	Quicken Loans Arena (first round on-campus)
2013	(4) Central Michigan	86–68	(3) Akron	Crystal Bradford, Central Michigan	Quicken Loans Arena (first round on-campus)
2014	(3) Akron	79–68	(5) Ball State	Rachel Tecca, Akron	Quicken Loans Arena (first round on-campus)
2015	(1) Ohio	76–64	(6) Eastern Michigan	Kiyanna Black, Ohio	Quicken Loans Arena (first round on-campus)
2016	(8) Buffalo	73–71 (OT)	(2) Central Michigan	Stephanie Reid, Buffalo	Quicken Loans Arena (first round on-campus)
2017	(6) Toledo	82–71	(4) Northern Illinois	Mikaela Boyd, Toledo	Quicken Loans Arena (first round on-campus)
2018	(1) Central Michigan	96–91	(2) Buffalo	Reyna Frost, Central Michigan	Quicken Loans Arena (first round on-campus)
2019	(4) Buffalo	77–61	(2) Ohio	Cierra Dillard, Buffalo	Quicken Loans Arena (first round on-campus)
2020	Canceled due to the COVID-19 pandemic				Rocket Mortgage FieldHouse
2021	(2) Central Michigan	77–72	(1) Bowling Green	Micaela Kelly, Central Michigan	Rocket Mortgage FieldHouse
2022	(2) Buffalo	79–75	(5) Ball State	Dyaisha Fair, Buffalo	Rocket Mortgage FieldHouse
2023	(1) Toledo	73–58	(2) Bowling Green	Quinesha Lockett, Toledo	Rocket Mortgage FieldHouse
2024	(3) Kent State	78–60	(4) Buffalo	Shumate Katie, Kent State	Rocket Mortgage FieldHouse
2025	(1) Ball State	65–58	(2) Toledo	Ally Becki, Ball State	Rocket Arena
2026	(1) Miami	68–58	(6) Toledo	Amber Scalia, Miami	Rocket Arena
2027					Rocket Arena
2028					Rocket Arena
2029					Rocket Arena
2030					Rocket Arena

== Performance by school ==
School	Tenure	Championships	Championship years
Bowling Green	1982–present	11	1987, 1988, 1989, 1990, 1993, 1994, 2005, 2006, 2007, 2010, 2011
Toledo	1982–present	9	1991, 1992, 1995, 1996, 1997, 1999, 2001, 2017, 2023
Central Michigan	1982–present	5	1983, 1984, 2013, 2018, 2021
Kent State	1982–present	4	1998, 2000, 2002, 2024
Miami	1982–present	3	1982, 2008, 2026
Buffalo	1999–present	3	2016, 2019, 2022
Western Michigan	1982–present	2	1985, 2003
Eastern Michigan	1982–present	2	2004, 2012
Ohio	1982–present	2	1986, 2015
Ball State	1982–present	2	2009, 2025
Akron	1993–present	1	2014
Northern Illinois	1982–1986; 1998–present	0	—
UMass	2026–present	0	—
Marshall	1998–2005	0	—

Former conference members shaded in ██ silver

== See also ==
- Mid-American Conference men's basketball tournament
