= Fran Recchia =

American basketball player and coach

Current position
- Title: Head coach
- Team: Kent State
- Conference: MAC
- Record: 0–0 (–)

Biographical details
- Born: September 13, 1983 (age 43)
- Education: Virginia Tech

Coaching career (HC unless noted)
- 2005-06: Virginia Tech (GA)
- 2007–2010: William Byrd High School
- 2010–2012: Radford (asst.)
- 2012-13: Tusculum College (asst.)
- 2013–2016: Radford (asst.)
- 2016–2018: Kent State (asst.)
- 2018–2026: Kent State (assoc. HC)
- 2026–present: Kent State

Head coaching record
- Overall: 0–0 (–)

Frances Townsend Recchia (born September 13, 1983) is an American women's basketball head coach and former player. She is the current head coach of the Kent State University women's basketball team.

== Early life and education ==
Fran Recchia is from Flower Mound, Texas where she graduated from Edward S. Marcus High School. She earned a scholarship to play basketball at Virginia Tech under head coach Bonnie Henrickson where she was a guard from 2001 to 2005. She earned a bachelor's degree physical education from Virginia Tech in 2004. After her playing career was complete she was a graduate assistant under Beth Dunkenberger for one season with the Virginia Tech Hokies where she earned a master's degree in education in 2006.

== Coaching career ==
Her first head coaching job was at William Byrd High School beginning in 2007. Her first collegiate coaching job was as an assistant under Tajama Abraham Ngongba at Radford from 2010 through 2012. She served as an assistant at Tusculum College before returning to Radford as an assistant under new head coach Mike McGuire where she remained until 2016.

=== Kent State ===
From 2016 through 2026 she served as an assistant on Todd Starkey's staff at Kent State, becoming the associate head coach in 2018. The Golden Flashes improved by 13 games in her first season as an assistant as they won the East division of the MAC. They earned another East division title in 2020. In her later years under Starkey, Kent State won the 2024 MAC women's basketball tournament and advanced to the 2024 NCAA tournament.

On March 26, 2026, Starkey accepted the associate head coach position at Arizona and Recchia was promoted to head coach.

== Head coaching record ==
Record table
Season	Team	Overall	Conference	Standing	Postseason
Kent State Golden Flashes (Mid-American Conference) (2026–present)
2026–27	Kent State	0–0	0–0		
Kent State:		0–0 (–)	0–0 (–)		
Total:		0–0 (–)			
National champion Postseason invitational champion Conference regular season champion Conference regular season and conference tournament champion Division regular season champion Division regular season and conference tournament champion Conference tournament champion
