= Marsha Reall =

American basketball coach

Coaching career (HC unless noted)
- 1985–1986: Ball State
- 1986–1987: Purdue
- 1990–1999: Ohio

Head coaching record
- Overall: 305–186 (.621)

Accomplishments and honors

Awards
- 2× MAC Coach of the Year (1994, 1995)

Marsha Reall is an American former head coach of women's college basketball. She resigned after coaching one season at Purdue, to their then best ever record of 18–9. Reall started her coaching career at Saginaw Valley State University in 1979, becoming the first woman coach for their women's basketball program.

== Early life ==
Marsha Reall graduated from Ohio State University. She is from Mount Gilead, Ohio. Reall was an assistant coach for Ohio State University in the 1970s.

== Coaching career ==
=== Saginaw Valley State University ===
Reall began her coaching career at Saginaw Valley State University, becoming the first female coach for the women's basketball team. In the 1984–85 season, the Cardinals posted a 32–1 record, a record that still stands today. That team also holds the records for most points (2,753), most field goals made (1,163), and best field goal percentage (.485). Reall's coaching record at SVSU stands at 151–37.

=== Ball State University ===
Reall was the head coach for one season at Ball State University. She finished the season with a record of 13–14, at the time her only losing season ever. It was the best record for the team for the past decade. She was on a three-year contract, and the director of women's athletics at Ball State was disappointed to see her go, and hoped their next coach would stay at Ball State even if they are successful there. Purdue did not recruit Reall for long, with their associate athletic director saying "Two weeks ago, I didn't know Marsha Reall existed". She also said, "We don't have multi-year contracts, but I don't think that will be a problem."

=== Purdue University ===
Reall coached Purdue University's women's basketball team for one season, reaching a record of 18–9, the best year Purdue had to date. Her resignation came as a surprise. The associate athletic director, who was in charge of women's sports, said "I learned of Marsha's decision yesterday, and it came as a surprise. I know Marsha feels strongly she has to do this. She had a good, successful year, and we hate to see her do this."

=== Ohio University ===
She took over the head coaching job in Ohio University in 1990. She coached there for nine seasons, including a Mid-American Conference Championship in 1995, and was voted coach of the year twice. She had the most wins in program history until her total was surpassed by Bob Boldon during the 2019–2020 season. She finished her coaching career with a record of 123–126.

== Head coaching record ==
Record table
Season	Team	Overall	Conference	Standing	Postseason
Saginaw Valley State Cardinals (Great Lakes Intercollegiate Athletic Conference) (1979–1985)
1979–80	Saginaw Valley State	21–10	4–6		
1980–81	Saginaw Valley State	16–14	7–7		
1981–82	Saginaw Valley State	27–5	14–2		
1982–83	Saginaw Valley State	25–6	13–3		
1983–84	Saginaw Valley State	30–1	16–0		
1984–85	Saginaw Valley State	32–1	16–0		
Saginaw Valley State:		151–37 (.803)	70–18 (.795)		
Ball State Cardinals (Mid-American Conference) (1985–1986)
1985–86	Ball State	13–14	9–9		
Ball State:		13–14 (.481)	9–9		
Purdue Boilermakers (Big Ten Conference) (1986–1987)
1986–87	Purdue	18–9	10–8	5th	
Purdue:		18–9 (.667)	10–8 (.556)		
Ohio Bobcats (Mid-American Conference) (1990–1999)
1990–91	Ohio	10–18	6–10		
1991–92	Ohio	11–17	5–11		
1992–93	Ohio	13–14	10–8		
1993–94	Ohio	17–10	13–5		
1994–95	Ohio	23–7	15–3		
1995–96	Ohio	16–12	11–17		
1996–97	Ohio	12–15	9–9		
1997–98	Ohio	17–11	13–5		
1998–99	Ohio	4–22	2–14		
Ohio:		123–126 (.494)	84–82 (.506)		
Total:		305–186 (.621)			
National champion Postseason invitational champion Conference regular season champion Conference regular season and conference tournament champion Division regular season champion Division regular season and conference tournament champion Conference tournament champion
