= IU Indy Jaguars women's basketball =

2025–26 IU Indy Jaguars women's basketball team
- University: Indiana University Indianapolis
- Head coach: Kate Bruce (4th season)
- Location: Indianapolis, Indiana
- Arena: The Jungle (capacity: 1,215)
- Conference: Horizon League
- Nickname: Jaguars
- Colors: Red, gold, and black
- Student section: Red Zone

NCAA Division I tournament appearances
- 2022

Conference tournament champions
- 2020, 2022

Conference regular-season champions
- 2020, 2022

Uniforms
Home	Away

The IU Indy Jaguars women's basketball team is the women's basketball team that represents Indiana University Indianapolis in Indianapolis, IN, United States. The team currently competes in the Horizon League.

== History ==
IUPUI began play in 1976. As of the end of the 2019–20 season, they have an all-time record of 577–602. The Jaguars appeared in their first NCAA tournament in 2022 after having won the 2020 Horizon League women's basketball tournament to qualify for the 2020 NCAA tournament, which was cancelled due to the COVID-19 pandemic. The Jaguars also participated in the WNIT in 2013, 2014, 2016, 2017 and 2019, making the Second Round in 2014 and 2016.

IUPUI became known as IU Indy following the 2023–24 school year, after IUPUI was dissolved by the Indiana University and Purdue University systems.

== Postseason ==
=== NAIA Division I ===
The Jaguars made the NAIA Division I women's basketball tournament two times, with a combined record of 3–2.

Year	Seed	Round	Opponent	Result
1987	NR	First Round	#4 North Georgia	L, 70–86
1991	NR	First Round; Second Round; Quarterfinals; Semifinals	#3 Simon Fraser #14 Midland Lutheran #6 Wingate #2 SW Oklahoma State	W, 79–77; W, 99–79; W, 99–96; L, 49–69

=== NCAA tournament results ===
Year	Seed	Round	Opponent	Result
2020	Canceled due to the COVID-19 pandemic			
2022	#13	First Round	#4 Oklahoma	L 72–78
