= 2007 MAC women's basketball tournament =

Sports tournament

- Classification: Division I
- Teams: 12
- Site: Quicken Loans Arena; Cleveland, Ohio
- Champions: Bowling Green
- Winning coach: Curt Miller
- MVP: Carin Horne (Bowling Green)
- MAC women's basketball tournaments

2006–07 Mid-American Conference women's basketball standings
	Conf.				Overall
Team	W		L	PCT	W		L	PCT
No. 20 Bowling Green †	16	–	1	.941	29	–	3	.906
Kent State	11	–	5	.688	15	–	13	.536
Ohio	10	–	6	.625	18	–	12	.600
Miami (OH)	6	–	10	.375	12	–	18	.400
Buffalo	5	–	11	.313	10	–	19	.345
Akron	3	–	13	.188	10	–	19	.345
West
Ball State	13	–	3	.813	24	–	6	.800
Eastern Michigan	10	–	7	.588	16	–	13	.552
Northern Illinois	8	–	8	.500	19	–	12	.613
Western Michigan	6	–	10	.375	14	–	18	.438
Toledo	6	–	10	.375	11	–	19	.367
Central Michigan	3	–	13	.188	11	–	19	.367
† 2007 MAC tournament winner Rankings from AP poll

The 2007 Mid-American Conference women's basketball tournament was the post-season basketball tournament for the Mid-American Conference (MAC) 2006–07 college basketball season. The 2007 tournament was held March 4–10, 2007. Regular season champion Bowling Green won their third straight championship over West Division winner Ball State. Carin Horne of Bowling Green was the MVP.

== Format ==
The top two seeds in each division received byes into the quarterfinals. All rounds were held at Quicken Loans Arena.

== Bracket ==
First round Sunday, March 4
4W	Toledo	64
5E	Buffalo	49
3E	Ohio	55
6W	Central Michigan	51
4E	Miami	58
5W	Western Michigan	74
3W	Northern Illinois	69
6E	Akron	56

Quarterfinals; Tuesday, March 6
1E	Bowling Green	71
4W	Toledo	62
2W	Eastern Michigan	79
3E	Ohio	69
1W	Ball State	56
5W	Western Michigan	53
2E	Kent State	68
3W	Northern Illinois	72

Semifinals; Friday, March 9
1E	Bowling Green	71
2W	Eastern Michigan	57
1W	Ball State	83
3W	Northern Illinois	72

Final; Saturday, March 10
1E	Bowling Green	67
1W	Ball State	53

== All-Tournament Team ==
Tournament MVP – Carin Horne, Bowling Green

Player	Team
Stephanie Raymond	Northern Illinois
Julie DeMuth	Ball State
Kate Achter	Bowling Green
Ali Mann	Bowling Green
Carin Horne	Bowling Green
