= 2006 MAC women's basketball tournament =

- Classification: Division I
- Teams: 12
- Site: Quicken Loans Arena; Cleveland, Ohio
- Champions: Bowling Green
- Winning coach: Curt Miller
- MVP: Ali Mann (Bowling Green)
- MAC women's basketball tournaments

2005–06 Mid-American Conference women's basketball standings
	Conf.				Overall
Team	W		L	PCT	W		L	PCT
No. 23 Bowling Green †	16	–	0	1.000	28	–	2	.933
Kent State	12	–	4	.750	21	–	9	.700
Buffalo	5	–	11	.313	10	–	18	.357
Ohio	5	–	11	.313	9	–	20	.310
Miami (OH)	3	–	12	.200	8	–	20	.286
Akron	1	–	14	.067	5	–	23	.179
West
Eastern Michigan	15	–	1	.938	22	–	7	.759
Western Michigan	11	–	5	.688	13	–	14	.481
Ball State	9	–	7	.563	17	–	12	.586
Central Michigan	7	–	9	.438	16	–	12	.571
Northern Illinois	7	–	9	.438	12	–	17	.414
Toledo	4	–	12	.250	11	–	18	.379
† 2006 MAC tournament winner Rankings from AP poll

The 2006 Mid-American Conference women's basketball tournament was the post-season basketball tournament for the Mid-American Conference (MAC) 2005–06 college basketball season. The 2006 tournament was held March 4–11, 2006. Regular season champion Bowling Green won their second straight championship over Kent State. Ali Mann of Bowling Green was the MVP.

== Format ==
The top two seeds in each division received byes into the quarterfinals. The first round was played at campus sites. All other rounds were held at Quicken Loans Arena.

== Bracket ==
First round Saturday, March 4
4W	Northern Illinois	73
5E	Miami	65
3E	Buffalo	58
6W	Toledo	70
4E	Ohio	74
5W	Central Michigan	57
3W	Ball State	71
6E	Akron	46

Quarterfinals; Wednesday, March 8
1E	Bowling Green	73
4W	Northern Illinois	61
2W	Western Michigan	59
6W	Toledo	64
1W	Eastern Michigan	76
4E	Ohio	66
2E	Kent State	69
3W	Ball State	52

Semifinals; Friday, March 10
1E	Bowling Green	68
6W	Toledo	46
1W	Eastern Michigan	56
2E	Kent State	70

Final; Saturday, March 11
1E	Bowling Green	64
2E	Kent State	39

== All-Tournament Team ==
Tournament MVP – Ali Mann, Bowling Green

Player	Team
Lindsay Shearer	Kent State
Ryan Coleman	Eastern Michigan
Ali Mann	Bowling Green
Liz Honegegr	Bowling Green
Kate Achter	Bowling Green
