= 2003 MAC women's basketball tournament =

- Classification: Division I
- Teams: 13
- Site: Gund Arena; Cleveland, Ohio
- Champions: Western Michigan
- Winning coach: Ron Stewart
- MVP: Casey Rost (Western Michigan)
- MAC women's basketball tournaments

2002–03 Mid-American Conference women's basketball standings
	Conf.				Overall
Team	W		L	PCT	W		L	PCT
Miami (OH)	11	–	5	.688	17	–	12	.586
Kent State	10	–	6	.625	16	–	13	.552
Buffalo	9	–	7	.563	18	–	11	.621
Marshall	7	–	9	.438	12	–	17	.414
Ohio	5	–	11	.313	9	–	19	.321
Akron	1	–	15	.063	2	–	26	.071
West
Ball State	12	–	4	.750	20	–	9	.690
Toledo	12	–	4	.750	20	–	9	.690
Western Michigan †	10	–	6	.625	20	–	11	.645
Eastern Michigan	9	–	7	.563	13	–	16	.448
Northern Illinois	8	–	8	.500	12	–	16	.429
Bowling Green	5	–	11	.313	12	–	16	.429
Central Michigan	5	–	11	.313	11	–	17	.393
† 2003 MAC tournament winner Rankings from AP poll

The 2003 Mid-American Conference women's basketball tournament was the post-season basketball tournament for the Mid-American Conference (MAC) 2002–03 college basketball season. The 2003 tournament was held March 8–15, 2003. Western Michigan won the championship over Ball State. Casey Rost of Western Michigan was the MVP.

== Format ==
The top three seeds received byes into the quarterfinals. The first round was played at campus sites. All other rounds were held at Gund Arena.

== Bracket ==
First round March 8, 2003
8	Northern Illinois	58
9	Marshall	70
4	Western Michigan	101
13	Akron	60
5	Kent State	83
12	Ohio	60
7	Eastern Michigan	66
10	Bowling Green	54
6	Buffalo	72
11	Central Michigan	53

Quarterfinals; March 12, 2003
1	Toledo	80
9	Marshall	66
4	Western Michigan	87
5	Kent State	72
2	Miami	80
7	Eastern Michigan	66
3	Ball State	81
6	Buffalo	63

Semifinals; March 14, 2003
1	Toledo	57
4	Western Michigan	60
2	Miami	84
3	Ball State	93

Championship; March 15, 2003
4	Western Michigan	81
3	Ball State	76

== All-Tournament Team ==
Tournament MVP – Casey Rost, Western Michigan

Player	Team
Casey Rost	Western Michigan
Maria Jilian	Western Michigan
Tamara Bowie	Ball State
Kate Endress	Ball State
Karin Hoogendam	Toledo
