= Bob Boldon =

American basketball player & coach (b.1975)

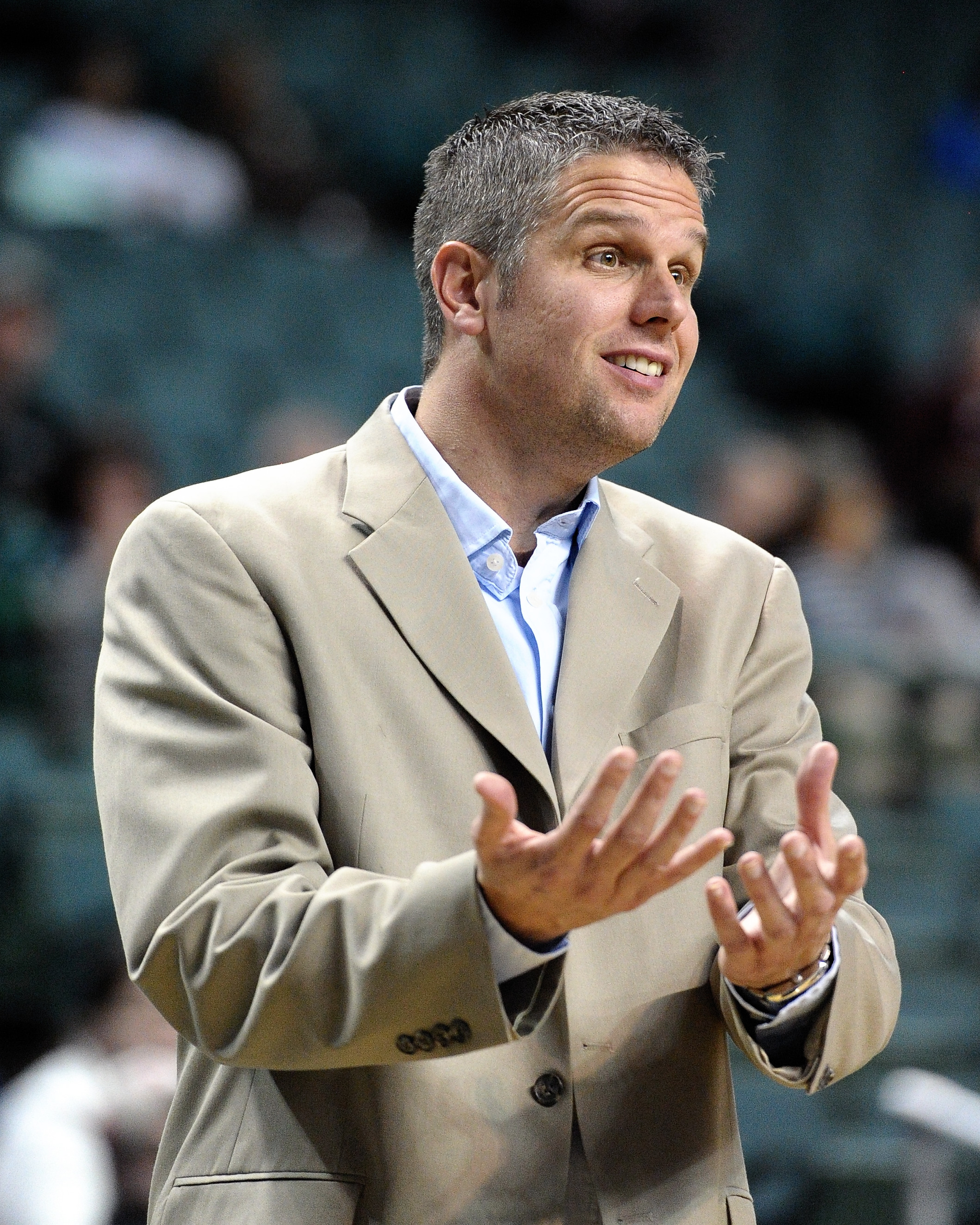
- Boldon in 2013

Current position
- Title: Head coach
- Team: Ohio
- Conference: MAC
- Record: 224–178 (.557)

Biographical details
- Born: May 1, 1975 (age 51); Louisville, Ohio, U.S.

Playing career
- 1993–1997: Walsh
- Position: Point guard

Coaching career (HC unless noted)
- 1997–1998: Walsh (assistant)
- 1998–1999: Wilmington (assistant)
- 1999–2001: IPFW (assistant)
- 2001–2002: Gannon (assistant)
- 2002–2004: Texas A&M-Corpus Christi (assistant)
- 2004–2006: Arkansas-Monticello
- 2006–2008: Akron (assistant)
- 2008–2009: Lambuth
- 2009–2010: Florida Gulf Coast (assistant)
- 2010–2013: Youngstown State
- 2013–present: Ohio

Head coaching record
- Overall: 321–265 (.548)
- Tournaments: 0–1 (NCAA Division I); 7–7 (WNIT); 8–7 (MAC)

Accomplishments and honors

Championships
- MAC tournament championship (2015)

Awards
- MAC Coach of the Year (2015); Horizon League Coach of the Year (2013)

Robert John Boldon (born May 1, 1975) is an American women's basketball coach and former basketball player. He is the current head women's basketball coach at Ohio University. He previously held the same position at Youngstown State University, Lambuth, and Arkansas-Monticello.

== Playing career ==
Boldon started at point guard for four years and led the Walsh Cavaliers to the NAIA Final Four in 1995–96. As a freshman, Boldon averaged 8.2 points and accumulated 163 assists. Over the next three years, Boldon was named First Team All-Mid-Ohio Conference each season, accumulating 204 assists and an average of 12.7 points as a sophomore, 222 assists and an average of 14.5 points as a junior, and 186 assists and an average of 14.3 points as a senior. During his junior season, Boldon led his team to the Mid-Ohio Conference championship and was named the MOC Player of the Year, first team NAIA All-American, and Mr. Hustle at the NAIA National Tournament. He was named NAIA Second Team All-American following his senior season. He is still Walsh's career assist leader with 775 and is fourth in career points with 1,694. In 2008, he was inducted into the Walsh Athletics Wall of Fame.

== Education and personal life ==
Boldon, a native of Louisville, Ohio, graduated from Walsh University in 1997 with a bachelor's degree in elementary education. He earned his master's degree in liberal studies from Indiana in 2003. Boldon is married and has four sons.

== Coaching career ==
He began his head coaching career at University of Arkansas at Monticello in the 2004–05 season and also served as the head coach of the women's basketball team at Lambuth University in 2008–09. Boldon also served as an assistant coach at Walsh, Wilmington, IPFW, Gannon, Texas A&M-Corpus Christi, Akron, and Florida Gulf Coast University.

=== Youngstown State ===
Boldon led Youngstown State to its biggest win increase ever under a first-year head coach in the 2010–11 campaign. Overall, the Penguins went 6–24 for the campaign for a six-win improvement from the previous year. In 2010, he led the Penguins their first victory in nearly two years. In his third year the Penguins won 23 games and finished second in the Horizon League. They qualified for the 2013 WNIT.

=== Ohio ===
He was announced as Ohio's head coach on March 28, 2013. He won MAC championships during his 2nd and 3rd seasons at Ohio. They won the 2015 MAC tournament and played in the NCAA tournament where they lost to Arizona State. He was named 2015 MAC Coach of the year. During the 2018–19 season his team won a school record 30 games and he became the leader in coaching wins in program history. Ohio played in the WNIT in 2016, 2017, 2019, 2021, 2022 and 2026.

== Head coaching record ==
Record table
Season	Team	Overall	Conference	Standing	Postseason
Arkansas-Monticello Cotton Blossoms (Gulf South Conference) (2004–2006)
2004–05	Arkansas-Monticello	15–14	8–8	T–3rd	
2005–06	Arkansas-Monticello	15–13	9–7	T–3rd	
Arkansas-Monticello:		30–27 (.526)	17–15 (.531)		
Lambuth Eagles (Independent) (2008–2009)
2008–09	Lambuth	29–7			
Lambuth:		29–7 (.806)			
Youngstown State Penguins (Horizon League) (2010–2013)
2010–11	Youngstown State	6–24	4–14	T-9th	
2011–12	Youngstown State	10–20	4–14	10th	
2012–13	Youngstown State	23–10	11–5	2nd	WNIT Second Round
Youngstown State:		39–54 (.419)	19–33 (.365)		
Ohio Bobcats (Mid-American Conference) (2013–present)
2013–14	Ohio	9–21	4–14	T-4th (East)	
2014–15	Ohio	27–5	16–2	1st (East)	NCAA first round
2015–16	Ohio	26–7	16–2	1st (East)	WNIT Third Round
2016–17	Ohio	22–10	12–6	2nd (East)	WNIT First Round
2017–18	Ohio	16–15	9–9	3rd East	
2018–19	Ohio	30–6	14–4	1st East	WNIT Quarterfinals
2019–20	Ohio	19–11	11–7	T-1st East	MAC Semifinals*
2020–21	Ohio	15–9**	11–6**	3rd	WNIT Regional consolation championship game
2021–22	Ohio	15–15	9–10	8th	WNIT First Round
2022–23	Ohio	6–23	4–14	T-11th	
2023–24	Ohio	11–19	8–10	T-6th	
2024–25	Ohio	6–23	4–14	T-10th	
2025–26	Ohio	18–14	11–7	5th	WNIT First Round
2026–27	Ohio	3–1	0–0		
Ohio:		224–178 (.557)	129–104 (.554)		
Total:		321–265 (.548)			
National champion Postseason invitational champion Conference regular season champion Conference regular season and conference tournament champion Division regular season champion Division regular season and conference tournament champion Conference tournament champion

* MAC tournament had to stop due to COVID-19 pandemic. ** Boldon missed one conference game due to a positive COVID-19 test. The team lost the game and the loss doesn’t count towards his record.
