= 2015 MAC women's basketball tournament =

- Classification: Division I
- Season: 2014–15
- Teams: 12
- Site: Quicken Loans Arena; Cleveland, Ohio
- Champions: Ohio
- Winning coach: Bob Boldon (1st title)
- MVP: Kiyanna Black (Ohio)
- Television: TWCS/ESPN3
- MAC women's basketball tournaments

2014–15 Mid-American Conference women's basketball standings
	Conf.				Overall
Team	W		L	PCT	W		L	PCT
Ohio†	16	–	2	.889	27	–	5	.844
Akron	12	–	6	.667	22	–	8	.733
Buffalo	11	–	7	.611	19	–	12	.613
Miami (OH)	4	–	14	.222	7	–	23	.233
Kent State	3	–	15	.167	5	–	25	.167
Bowling Green	2	–	16	.111	9	–	21	.300
West
Ball State	13	–	5	.722	17	–	13	.567
Eastern Michigan	11	–	7	.611	22	–	13	.629
Western Michigan	11	–	7	.611	20	–	12	.625
Toledo	10	–	8	.556	18	–	13	.581
Northern Illinois	8	–	10	.444	12	–	17	.414
Central Michigan	7	–	11	.389	13	–	18	.419
† 2015 MAC tournament winner As of 14 March 2015; Rankings from AP poll

The 2015 Mid-American Conference women's basketball tournament was the post-season basketball tournament for the Mid-American Conference (MAC) 2014–15 college basketball season. The 2015 tournament was held March 9–14, 2015. Top seed Ohio won the tournament by beating sixth-seeded Eastern Michigan 60–44 in the final. They lost to Arizona State in the first round NCAA tournament. Kiyanna Black of Ohio was the MVP.

== Format ==
First round games were held on campus sites at the higher seed on March 10. The remaining rounds were held at Quicken Loans Arena, between March 11–14. As with the previous tournaments, the top two seeds received byes into the semifinals, with the three and four seeds receiving a bye to the quarterfinals.

== Schedule ==
Game	Time*	Matchup^{#}	Television
First Round – Monday, March 9
1	5:30 PM	#12 Bowling Green at #5 Western Michigan	MACDN
2	6:30 PM	#9 Central Michigan at #8 Northern Illinois	ESPN3
3	7:00 PM	#11 Kent State at #6 Eastern Michigan	MACDN
4	7:00 PM	#10 Miami at #5 Toledo	BCSN
Second Round – Wednesday, March 11
5	12:00 PM	#5 Western Michigan vs. #9 Central Michigan	MACDN
6	2:30 PM	#6 Eastern Michigan vs. #7 Toledo	MACDN
Quarterfinals – Thursday, March 12
7	12:00 PM	#4 Buffalo vs. #5 Western Michigan	MACDN
8	2:30 PM	#3 Akron vs. #6 Eastern Michigan	MACDN
Semifinals – Friday, March 13
9	12:00 PM	#1 Ohio vs. #4 Buffalo	TWCS/ESPN3
10	2:30 PM	#2 Ball State vs. #6 Eastern Michigan	TWCS/ESPN3
Championship Game – Saturday, March 14
11	1:00 PM	#1 Ohio vs. #6 Eastern Michigan	TWCS/ESPN3
* Game times in ET. # Rankings denote tournament seed

== Bracket ==
First round Monday, March 9
5	Western Michigan	65
12	Bowling Green	42
8	Northern Illinois	44
9	Central Michigan	49
6	Eastern Michigan	70
11	Kent State	52
7	Toledo	62
10	Miami	47

Second round Wednesday, March 11
1	Ohio
(bye)
4	Buffalo
(bye)
5	Western Michigan	81
9	Central Michigan	68
2	Ball State
(bye)
3	Akron
(bye)
6	Eastern Michigan	74
7	Toledo	57

Quarterfinals; Thursday, March 12
1	Ohio
(bye)
4	Buffalo	63
5	Western Michigan	60
2	Ball State
(bye)
3	Akron	66
6	Eastern Michigan	95

Semifinals; Friday, March 13
1	Ohio	63
4	Buffalo	55
2	Ball State	65
6	Eastern Michigan	75

Championship; Saturday, March 14
1	Ohio	60
6	Eastern Michigan	44

All times listed are Eastern

== All-Tournament Team ==
Tournament MVP – Kiyanna Black, Ohio

Player	Team
Kristen Sharkey	Buffalo
Cha Sweeney	Eastern Michigan
Lexie Baldwin	Ohio
Kiyanna Black	Ohio
Mairah Byard	Ohio
