= Ohio Bobcats women's basketball =

2026–27 Ohio Bobcats women's basketball team
- University: Ohio University
- Athletic director: Slade Larscheid
- Head coach: Bob Boldon (12th season)
- Location: Athens, Ohio
- Arena: Convocation Center (capacity: 13,080)
- Conference: Mid-American Conference
- Nickname: Bobcats
- Colors: Hunter green and white

NCAA Division I tournament appearances
- 1986, 1995, 2015

Conference tournament champions
- 1986, 2015

Conference regular-season champions
- 1986, 1995, 2015, 2016

Conference division champions
- 2015, 2016, 2019, 2020

Uniforms
Home	Away	Alternate

The Ohio Bobcats women's basketball team is an intercollegiate varsity sports program of Ohio University. The team is a member of the Mid-American Conference East Division competing in Division I of the National Collegiate Athletic Association (NCAA). The Bobcats have played their home games in the Convocation Center since 1973.

== History ==
Ohio University's women’s basketball program began its unofficial debut in 1965. It was created by the Women’s Sports and Recreation Department (WRA) chapter of Ohio University. The team, led by Bev Smith, competed for 8 years before they became a part of the Women’s Intercollegiate Athletics (WICA) organization. This marked the beginning of funding from athletics as opposed to education.

Upon its official debut, the women’s basketball team played their first game in the 1973–74 season. The Bobcats have won three Mid-American Conference tournament titles in 1986, 1995, and 2015. They have been MAC regular season champions four times, most recently in the 2015–16 season. They have clinched a spot in the NCAA women's tournament three times, in which they have gone 0–3, most recently appearing in the 2014–15 season.

The Bobcats' most notable season came in 1985–86. The team went 24–2 in the regular season, with a 16–2 record in the MAC. They won their first MAC season and tournament titles, as well as setting eight school records that are still held as of 2016. Their coach, 23-year-old Amy Prichard, became the first Ohio head coach to be awarded the honor of the MAC Coach of the Year.

The Bobcats' current head coach is Bob Boldon. Boldon played college basketball at Walsh University from 1993–97. After debuting during the 2013–14 season, Boldon's team posted a record of 9–20. During his second season at Ohio University, he led the Bobcats to their first winning season since the 2007–08 season. Boldon led the team to the MAC championship, clinching a spot in the 2015 NCAA tournament. The team lost in the first round to Arizona State, by a score of 74–55. In the 2018-19 season the Bobcats won 30 games, being the first basketball team to do so between both Bobcat men's and women's programs.

== Seasonal Results ==
as of 11/18/2026

Mid-American Conference
Year	Overall Rec.	Conference Rec.
1973–74	10–5	NA
1974–75	12–5	NA
1975–76	3–12	NA
1976–77	8–7	NA
1977–78	5–8	NA
1978–79	11–8	NA
1979–80	10–12	NA
1980–81	6–20	NA
1981–82	9–16	3–7
1982–83	15–13	11–7
1983–84	14–14	13–5
1984–85	11–16	6–12
1985–86	26–3	16–2
1986–87	10–16	7–9
1987–88	10–18	5–11
1988–89	8–20	5–11
1989–90	9–18	3–13
1990–91	10–18	6–10
1991–92	11–17	5–11
1992–93	13–14	10–8
1993–94	17–10	13–5
1994–95	23–7	15–3
1995–96	16–12	11–7
1996–97	12–15	9–9
1997–98	17–11	13–5
1998–99	4–22	2–14
1999–00	11–17	6–10

Mid-American Conference
Year	Overall Rec.	Conference Rec.
2000–01	9–20	5–11
2001–02	13–16	7–8
2002–03	9–19	5–11
2003–04	13–15	7–9
2004–05	13–16	8–8
2005–06	9–20	5–11
2006–07	18–12	9–7
2007–08	20–13	10–6
2008–09	13–18	7–9
2009–10	8–22	4–12
2010–11	9–22	4–12
2011–12	14–18	6–10
2012–13	6–23	1–15
2013–14	9–21	4–14
2014–15	27–5	16–2
2015–16	26–7	16–2
2016–17	22–10	12–6
2017–18	16–15	9–9
2018–19	30–6	14–4
2019–20	19–11	11–7
2020–21	15–9	11–6
2021–22	15–15	9–10
2022–23	6–23	4–14
2023–24	11–19	8–10
2024–25	6–23	4–14
2025–26	18–14	11–7
2026–27	3–1	0–0

== Postseason results ==
=== NCAA tournament results ===
The Bobcats have appeared in three NCAA Tournaments. Their combined record is 0-3.

Year	Seed	Round	Opponent	Result
1986	#9	First Round	#8 Illinois	L 69-68
1995	#14	First Round	#3 Washington	L 73-57
2015	#14	First Round	#3 Arizona State	L 74-55

=== Women's National Invitation Tournament results ===
Ohio has been selected to participate in five Women's National Invitation Tournaments. Their combined record is 6-6.

Year	Round	Opponent	Result
2016	Round 1	Marshall	W 76–68
2016	Round 2	Virginia Tech	W 64-57
2016	Round 3	Temple	L 75-61
2017	Round 1	Penn State	L 74-65
2019	Round 1	High Point	W 81-74
2019	Round 2	Middle Tennessee	W 59-57
2019	Round 3	Western Kentucky	W 68-60
2019	Quarterfinals	Northwestern	L 61-58
2021	Round 1	Clemson	L 60-65
2021	Consolation bracket Semi-Finals	Fordham	W 81-64
2021	Consolation bracket Finals	UMass	L 71-95
2022	Round 1	South Dakota State	L 87-57
2026	Round 1	UMBC	L 62–58

== Coaching staff ==
Name	Position	Year	Alma mater
Bob Boldon	Head coach	2013	Walsh University Indiana University 1997, 2003
Tavares Jackson	Assistant coach	2013	University of Minnesota Crookston 2000
Chelsea Welch	Assistant coach	2022	Wright State University 2018
Kaylee Gregory Bambule	Assistant coach	2022	Ohio University 2021
Abby Garnett	Assistant coach	2024	Ohio University 2022
Ebony Pegus	Director of Basketball Operations	2021	Massachusetts

== Bobcat basketball traditions ==
Ohio is a tradition-rich school, and many of those traditions are associated with athletics events, especially basketball. Some Ohio traditions include:

- Rufus the Bobcat – The school mascot, a fierce yet friendly looking Bobcat that always sports an Ohio jersey with a number "1" on the back.
- Ohio Varsity Band – The pep band which performs at every basketball game.
- "Stand Up and Cheer" – Ohio's fight song
- "Alma Mater, Ohio" – Ohio's alma mater song

== All-time records ==
=== All-time coaching records ===
Head coach	Period	W-L record	Win pct.	W-L record in the MAC	Win pct.	MAC Regular season championships
Nancy Schaub	1973–1977	33–29	.532	0-0	–	N/a
Kathy Martin	1977–1978	5–8	.385	0-0	–	N/a
Gwen Hoover	1978–1981	27–40	.403	0-0	–	N/a
Becky DeStefano	1981–1984	38–43	.469	27-19	.587	0
Amy Prichard	1984–1990	74–91	.448	42-58	.420	1
Marsha Reall	1990–1999	123–126	.494	84-82	.506	1
Lynn Bria	1999–2006	77–123	.385	43-68	.387	0
Sylvia Crawley	2006–2008	38–25	.603	19-13	.594	0
Semeka Randall	2008–2013	50–103	.327	22-58	.275	0
Bob Boldon	2013–present	224–178	.557	129-104	.554	2
TOTALS	1973–present	689–767	.473	366-404	.475	4

Source: Ohio Basketball Media Guide

As of 11/18/2026

=== Top five winning coaches ===
Head coach	Year	Period	W-L record	W-L record in the MAC	Win pct.
Bob Boldon	2013–present	224–178	.557	129-104	.554
Marsha Reall	1990–1999	123–126	.494	84-82	.506
Lynn Bria	1999–2006	77–123	.385	43-68	.387
Amy Prichard	1984–1990	74–91	.448	42-58	.420
Semeka Randall	2008–2013	50–103	.327	22-58	.275

=== All-time MAC records ===
The Bobcats have won 2 Mid-American Conference tournament titles in 1986, and 2015 as well as 4 MAC regular-season titles in 1986, 1995, 2015, and 2016. At the end of the 2025–2026 MAC season, Ohio owns an all-time MAC record of 366–404 (.475) in 43 seasons of league competition. The following are the all members of the MAC past and present not counting the postseason play as of March 2026:

Opponent	W-L record	Win pct.	Year WBB joined the MAC
Akron	45–19	.710	1992
Ball State	40–28	.597	1981
Bowling Green	29–54	.346	1981
Buffalo	20–28	.429	1998
Central Michigan	32–36	.463	1981
Eastern Michigan	39–24	.607	1981
Kent State	34–51	.398	1981
Miami	39–51	.432	1981
Northern Illinois	25–21	.533	1981–1986,1997
Toledo	22–43	.333	1981
Western Michigan	34–30	.524	1981
Marshall	11–5	.688	1997–2005
Total	366–404	.475	
