= Kent State Golden Flashes women's basketball =

College basketball team

2026–27 Kent State Golden Flashes women's basketball team
- University: Kent State University
- Head coach: Fran Recchia (1st season)
- Location: Kent, Ohio
- Arena: Memorial Athletic and Convocation Center (capacity: 6,327)
- Conference: Mid-American
- Nickname: Golden Flashes
- Colors: Navy blue and gold

NCAA Division I tournament second round
- 1996

NCAA Division I tournament appearances
- 1982, 1996, 1998, 2000, 2002, 2024

Conference tournament champions
- 1998, 2000, 2002, 2024

Conference regular-season champions
- 1996, 1998, 1999, 2000, 2002

Conference division champions
- 1998, 1999, 2000, 2001, 2002, 2003, 2005, 2017, 2020

Uniforms
Home	Away	Alternate

The Kent State Golden Flashes women's basketball team represents Kent State University in Kent, Ohio, United States. The Golden Flashes compete in the Mid-American Conference and last played in the NCAA Division I women's basketball tournament in 2024. Founded in 1973 as a club team, the Kent State women's basketball team received varsity status in 1975 and played their first official game in January 1976. Through the 2023–24 season, the Flashes have six total appearances in the NCAA Division I women's basketball tournament along with four Mid-American Conference tournament championships, five MAC overall titles, and nine MAC East division titles. Home games are held at the Memorial Athletic and Convocation Center, which has been the team's home venue since 1977. The head coach is Fran Recchia, who was hired on March 16, 2026.

== History ==
Women's basketball has been played at Kent State University since shortly after the campus first opened in September 1913, when it was known as the Kent State Normal School. As a teacher training school, the university's early enrollment was predominately female and president John McGilvrey felt that physical activity was important, so four intramural women's basketball teams were organized in early 1914. This basic setup continued through the 1960s in various forms with both women's physical education and intramural sports housed at Wills Gymnasium, the school's original gym. Men's physical education and varsity athletics were moved to the new and larger Men's Physical Education Building in 1950.

The passage of Title IX in 1972 resulted first in the establishment of three club-level women's basketball teams in 1973. The current program received varsity status in 1975 and played their home games at Wills Gymnasium for the 1976 and 1976–77 seasons before moving to Memorial Gym for the 1977–78 season. The team's first official game was held January 17, 1976, a 72–56 loss to Ashland College at Wills Gym. The Flashes won their first game on January 31 with a 70–30 victory over John Carroll University and finished 5–6 in their inaugural varsity season after going 1–11 in their final club season. Judy Devine, who was also serving as assistant athletic director and director of the new women's athletic program, was the team's first head coach, holding the position for the first two seasons. She led the team to a 9–8 season in 1976–77 and finished 14–14 as head coach, being succeeded in 1977 by Laurel Wartluft.

Initially, the team competed in the Ohio Association of Intercollegiate Sports for Women (OAISW) as the Mid-American Conference did not sponsor women's sports until 1981. The OAISW did not include a league schedule, but did have a post-season tournament. In 1979, Kent State was 23–8, their first 20-win season, and finished third at the OAISW tournament. Kent State's best finish was the 1981 tournament, where they lost 67–62 to the Ohio State Buckeyes in the championship game to finish second in the state with a 24–10 record. The following season was the first for Mid-American Conference play as the NCAA began sponsoring women's athletics. Although the Flashes finished tied for third in the conference standings and finished third at the conference tournament, Kent State was the MAC representative for the inaugural NCAA Women's Division I tournament as both the MAC champion and runner-up that season were already committed to the Association for Intercollegiate Athletics for Women (AIAW) and rules prevented players from participating in both tournaments. The Flashes were seeded eighth in the 32-team field, falling to top-seed Southern California in the opening round.

Laurel Wartluft coached the team through the 1985–86 season, finishing with an overall record of 135–119 (.539) and 28–55 (.337) in the MAC. Wartluft led the team to three consecutive 20-win seasons from 1978–79 through 1980–81 and their first NCAA tournament appearance, but was unable to finish higher than seventh in the MAC after a tie for third place in 1982. She was succeeded by Richard Keast, who coached through the 1988–89 season, compiling an overall record of 33–50 (.398) and 18–30 (.375) in the MAC. Under Keast, the team's best season was his first year, going 15–13 overall and 8–8 for a fourth-place finish in MAC play.

=== Bob Lindsay ===
Following the 1988–89 season, Keast was succeeded by Bob Lindsay. Lindsay would go on to coach the team for the next 23 seasons, earning MAC records with 260 conference wins and 418 wins overall. Under Lindsay, Kent State was a regular MAC contender, as the team posted 15 consecutive winning seasons from 1990–91 through the 2006–07 season, including seven consecutive seasons of 20 wins or more from 1995–96 through 2001–02. Lindsay also led the team to five MAC regular-season, three MAC tournament, and seven MAC East Division titles, including six consecutive MAC East Division championships from 1998 to 2003. Kent State also made four NCAA appearances, had one WNIT bid, and played in seven consecutive MAC tournament championship games during Lindsay's tenure.

Kent State won their first MAC regular-season title in 1996, finishing 24–7 overall and 15–2 in MAC play. Despite a loss to Toledo in the MAC tournament Championship game, the Flashes were selected as an at-large team in the 1996 NCAA Division I women's basketball tournament, as a tenth seed. In the opening round of the tournament, the Flashes posted their first tournament win with a 72–68 upset win over seventh-seeded Texas A&M. The team fell to second-seeded and host Penn State in the second round.

The program's best season in MAC play was the 1997–98 season as they finished 23–7 overall and 18–0 in MAC play, the fourth team in MAC history to accomplish the feat. It was followed by a victory in the MAC tournament championship game over Toledo and an automatic bid to the NCAA tournament as a 13th seed. In the NCAA tournament, Kent State fell at fourth-seeded Iowa State, 79–76.

Following a 22–7 season in 1998–99 that featured a second-consecutive MAC East title, but a loss in the 1999 MAC Championship game, the Flashes set a program mark for wins by posting 25 wins in the 1999–2000 season, finishing 25–6 with a 15–1 record in MAC play. After a victory over Toledo in the 2000 MAC tournament championship game at Public Hall in Cleveland, the Flashes were seeded ninth in the NCAA tournament, where they fell to eighth-seeded Arizona 71–60 in Knoxville, Tennessee.

Kent State returned to the MAC tournament championship for a sixth consecutive year in 2001 following their fourth straight MAC East Division title, but fell to top-seeded Toledo in overtime at Gund Arena in Cleveland. The following season, the Flashes won their second MAC regular-season title, their fifth-straight divisional title, and made a seventh-consecutive appearance in the MAC tournament championship game, where they defeated the Ball State Cardinals at Gund Arena. The team advanced to the NCAA tournament as a 14th seed, falling at Kansas State in the opening round.

The Flashes won their six straight MAC East title in 2003, but finished 16–13 overall and failed to advance to the MAC tournament championship game for the first time since 1995. The 2003–04 team finished 19–10 overall and made the program's first appearance in the Women's National Invitation Tournament (WNIT), where they were defeated at St. Joseph's. They would return to the top of the MAC East in 2005 and to the MAC tournament championship game in 2005 and 2006, but fell to Bowling Green both years. Kent State returned to the postseason in 2010 and 2011 following 20-win seasons, earning bids to the 2010 and 2011 WNIT.

At the conclusion of the 2011–12 season where the team went 6–22 overall and 5–11 in the MAC, Bob Lindsay's contract was not renewed by the university. The season was the worst season for the program and for Lindsay since his first season in 1988–89 when the team was 5–22 overall and 5–11 in the MAC and was just the third losing season under Lindsay. Lindsay was "stunned" by the firing as were basketball analysts. Athletic director Joel Nielsen stated that the decision to not renew Lindsay's contract was not based on the results of the 2011–12 season, but did not specify details beyond saying he reviewed the "entire body of work." Lindsay finished at Kent State with an overall record of 416–256 (.620) and 260–120 (.684) in the MAC.

=== Danielle O'Banion ===
Kent State announced the hiring of Danielle O'Banion as head coach on April 18, 2012, under a four-year deal. Prior to coming to Kent, O'Banion has served on the coaching staff at Memphis as an assistant and later as associate head coach and had previously been on staff as an assistant for five seasons at Minnesota and one season at Harvard. She played collegiately at Boston College from 1997 to 2001. O'Banion and the team received national attention in 2014 for O'Banion's fight against cancer after she was diagnosed with Stage II Lymphoma in November. Women's basketball coaches from around the U.S. wore lime green in support.

The program continued to struggle, going 3–27 overall and 1–15 in MAC play during O'Banion's first season, followed by a 7–23 overall and 4–14 record in the MAC in 2013–14, and 5–25 overall and 3–15 in the MAC for 2014–15. After finishing the 2015–16 season 6–23 overall and 3–15 in MAC play, the university elected to not renew O'Banion's contract. She concluded her tenure at Kent State with an overall record of 21–98 and a MAC record of 11–59. Todd Starkey, who had previously been an assistant coach at Indiana, was hired April 19, 2016, as the program's sixth head coach.

=== Todd Starkey ===
In his first season as head coach, Todd Starkey led the team to a 19–13 overall record and 13–5 in conference play to win the MAC East division title, the program's first since 2005. The season ended with a loss in the opening round of the WNIT, Kent State's first post-season appearance since 2011. Starkey was honored as the MAC Coach of the Year, the first KSU women's basketball coach to win the award since Bob Lindsay in 1998 and third overall. Senior Larissa Lurken was named MAC Player of the Year, the program's sixth recipient of the award and first since 2006.

== MAC tournament ==
Kent State has won four Mid-American Conference women's basketball tournament titles, winning in 1998, 2000, 2002, and 2024. The team has made 12 total appearances in the MAC championship game, including seven consecutive from 1996 to 2002. They are 39–31 in the tournament through 2024.

Mid-American Conference women's basketball tournament
Year	Seed	Location	Round	Result
1982	4th	Irving Gymnasium · Muncie, Indiana	Quarterfinal	W 70–68 over (5) Bowling Green
1982	4th	Irving Gymnasium · Muncie, Indiana	Semifinal	L 77–70 to (1) Miami
1982	4th	Irving Gymnasium · Muncie, Indiana	Third Place	W 75–74 OT over (2) Eastern Michigan
1987	4th	Centennial Hall · Toledo, Ohio	Semifinal	L 71–66 to (1) Bowling Green
1988	6th	Millett Hall · Oxford, Ohio	First	L 80–73 to (3) Miami
1991	4th	Memorial Gym · Kent, Ohio	First	W 79–72 over (5) Miami
1991	4th	Cobo Arena Detroit	Semifinal	L 90–73 to (1) Toledo
1992	3rd	MAC Center · Kent, Ohio	Quarterfinal	W 86–75 over (6) Eastern Michigan
1992	3rd	Cobo Arena · Detroit	Semifinal	W 106–103 OT over (2) Bowling Green
1992	3rd	Cobo Arena · Detroit	Final	L 78–57 to (1) Toledo
1993	3rd	MAC Center · Kent, Ohio	Quarterfinal	W 71–57 over (6) Central Michigan
1993	3rd	Battelle Hall · Columbus, Ohio	Semifinal	W 79–69 over (2) Miami
1993	3rd	Battelle Hall · Columbus, Ohio	Final	L 96–68 to (1) Bowling Green
1994	4th	MAC Center · Kent, Ohio	Quarterfinal	W 74–65 over (5) Miami
1994	4th	Battelle Hall · Columbus, Ohio	Semifinal	L 70–61 to (1) Bowling Green
1995	5th	Millett Hall · Oxford, Ohio	Quarterfinal	L 77–71 to (4) Miami
1996	1st	MAC Center · Kent, Ohio	Quarterfinal	W 87–61 over (8) Ball State
1996	1st	SeaGate Centre · Toledo, Ohio	Semifinal	W 88–57 over (4) Ohio
1996	1st	SeaGate Centre · Toledo, Ohio	Final	L 73–66 to (2) Toledo
1997	2nd	MAC Center · Kent, Ohio	Quarterfinal	W 106–63 over (7) Central Michigan
1997	2nd	SeaGate Centre · Toledo, Ohio	Semifinal	W 90–80 over (3)Miami
1997	2nd	SeaGate Centre · Toledo, Ohio	Final	L 88–64 to (1) Toledo
1998	1st	MAC Center · Kent, Ohio	Quarterfinal	W 111–73 over (8) Ball State
1998	1st	SeaGate Centre · Toledo, Ohio	Semifinal	W 80–65 over (4) Ohio
1998	1st	SeaGate Centre · Toledo, Ohio	Final	W 64–56 over (3) Toledo
1999	2nd	MAC Center · Kent, Ohio	Quarterfinal	W 84–48 over (7) Buffalo
1999	2nd	SeaGate Centre · Toledo, Ohio	Semifinal	W 60–50 over (3) Western Michigan
1999	2nd	SeaGate Centre · Toledo, Ohio	Final	L 65–50 to (1) Toledo
2000	1st	Public Hall · Cleveland	Quarterfinal	W 71–68 over (6) Buffalo
2000	1st	Public Hall · Cleveland	Semifinal	W 96–94 OT over (5) Eastern Michigan
2000	1st	Public Hall · Cleveland	Final	W 71–60 over (3) Toledo
2001	2nd	Gund Arena · Cleveland	Quarterfinal	W 85–78 over (10) Ohio
2001	2nd	Gund Arena · Cleveland	Semifinal	W 86–70 over (6) Miami
2001	2nd	Gund Arena · Cleveland	Final	L 74–65 OT to (1) Toledo
2002	1st	Gund Arena · Cleveland	Quarterfinal	W 83–63 over (8) Ohio
2002	1st	Gund Arena · Cleveland	Semifinal	W 74–50 over (4) Miami
2002	1st	Gund Arena · Cleveland	Final	W 73–59 over (2) Ball State
2003	5th	MAC Center · Kent, Ohio	First	W 83–60 over (12) Ohio
2003	5th	Gund Arena · Cleveland	Quarterfinal	L 87–72 to (4) Western Michigan
2004	3rd	Gund Arena · Cleveland	Quarterfinal	L 64–58 to (6) Marshall
2005	2nd	Quicken Loans Arena · Cleveland	Quarterfinal	W 93–74 over (7) Ohio
2005	2nd	Quicken Loans Arena · Cleveland	Semifinal	W 73–57 over (3) Marshall
2005	2nd	Quicken Loans Arena · Cleveland	Final	L 81–75 to (1) Bowling Green
2006	2nd-E	Quicken Loans Arena · Cleveland	Quarterfinal	W 69–52 over (3W) Ball State
2006	2nd-E	Quicken Loans Arena · Cleveland	Semifinal	W 70–56 over (1W) Eastern Michigan
2006	2nd-E	Quicken Loans Arena · Cleveland	Final	L 64–39 to (1E) Bowling Green
2007	2nd-E	Quicken Loans Arena · Cleveland	Quarterfinal	L 72–68 to (3W) Northern Illinois
2008	5th-E	Quicken Loans Arena · Cleveland	First	W 75–67 over (4W) Northern Illinois
2008	5th-E	Quicken Loans Arena · Cleveland	Quarterfinal	L 85–57 to (1E) Bowling Green
2009	2nd-E	Quicken Loans Arena · Cleveland	Opening	L 66–54 to (6E) Buffalo
2010	3rd	Quicken Loans Arena · Cleveland	Quarterfinal	W 68–55 over (6) Central Michigan
2010	3rd	Quicken Loans Arena · Cleveland	Semifinal	L 51–49 to (2) Toledo
2011	4th	Quicken Loans Arena · Cleveland	Quarterfinal	L 69–65 to (5) Eastern Michigan
2012	9th	Convocation Center · Athens, Ohio	First	L 58–40 to (8) Ohio
2013	12th	Stroh Center · Bowling Green, Ohio	First	L 76–35 to (5) Bowling Green
2014	12th	Worthen Arena · Muncie, Indiana	First	L 73–38 to (5) Ball State
2015	11th	Convocation Center · Ypsilanti, Michigan	First	L 70–52 to (6) Eastern Michigan
2016	11th	Convocation Center · Ypsilanti, Michigan	First	L 73–60 to (6) Eastern Michigan
2017	3rd	Quicken Loans Arena · Cleveland	Quarterfinal	L 67–63 to (6) Toledo
2018	10th	Savage Arena · Toledo, Ohio	First	W 80–76 OT over (7) Toledo
2018	10th	Quicken Loans Arena · Cleveland	Quarterfinal	L 72–50 to (2) Buffalo
2019	5th	Memorial Athletic and Convocation Center · Kent, Ohio	First	W 86–62 over (12) Bowling Green
2019	5th	Rocket Mortgage FieldHouse · Cleveland	Quarterfinal	L 85–52 to (4) Buffalo
2020	3rd	Rocket Mortgage FieldHouse · Cleveland	Quarterfinal	W 72–66 over Buffalo
2020	3rd	Rocket Mortgage FieldHouse · Cleveland	Semifinal	vs. (7) Eastern Michigan‡
2021	5th	Rocket Mortgage FieldHouse · Cleveland	Quarterfinal	L 73–66 to (4) Buffalo
2023	4th	Rocket Mortgage FieldHouse · Cleveland	Quarterfinal	W 75–68 over (5) Northern Illinois
2023	4th	Rocket Mortgage FieldHouse · Cleveland	Semifinal	L 68–58 to (1) Toledo
2024	3rd	Rocket Mortgage FieldHouse · Cleveland	Quarterfinal	W 63–60 over (5) Northern Illinois
2024	3rd	Rocket Mortgage FieldHouse · Cleveland	Semifinal	W 65–50 over (2) Ball State
2024	3rd	Rocket Mortgage FieldHouse · Cleveland	Final	W 78–60 over (4) Buffalo
Totals: 12 finals appearances, 4 championships, 39–31 record in tournament

Championship game victories highlighted in ██ yellow; losses in ██ wheat

‡=game and remainder of 2020 MAC women's basketball tournament canceled due to coronavirus pandemic

== Postseason ==
=== NCAA tournament ===
Kent State has played in the NCAA Division I women's basketball tournament six times, making the 1996 tournament as an at-large team, with automatic bids to the 1982, 1998, 2000, 2002, and 2024 tournaments. Their combined record is 1–6, the win a 72–68 victory over Texas A&M in the opening round of the 1996 tournament.

NCAA Division I women's basketball tournament
Year	Seed	Arena	Location	Region	Round	Result
1982	8th	Stokely Athletic Center	Knoxville, Tennessee	Mideast	First	L 99–55 to (1) Southern California
1996	10th	Bryce Jordan Center	University Park, Pennsylvania	West	First	W 72–68 over (7) Texas A&M
1996	10th	Bryce Jordan Center	University Park, Pennsylvania	West	Second	L 66–43 to (2) Penn State
1998	13th	Hilton Coliseum	Ames, Iowa	Mideast	First	L 79–76 to (4) Iowa State
2000	9th	Thompson–Boling Arena	Knoxville, Tennessee	Mideast	First	L 73–61 to (8) Arizona
2002	14th	Bramlage Coliseum	Manhattan, Kansas	Mideast	First	L 93–65 to (3) Kansas State
2024	15th	Joyce Center	Notre Dame, Indiana	Albany 1	First	L 81–67 to (2) Notre Dame

=== Women's National Invitation tournament ===
Kent State has made six appearances in the Women's National Invitation Tournament (WNIT). Their record is 2–5.

Women's National Invitation Tournament
Year	Seed	Arena	Location	Region	Round	Result
2004		Alumni Memorial Fieldhouse	Philadelphia		First	L 61–51 to St. Joseph's
2010		Crisler Arena	Ann Arbor, Michigan	Region 4	First	L 69–34 to Michigan
2011		Palumbo Center	Pittsburgh	Region 2	First	L 64–56 to Duquesne
2017		Crisler Center	Ann Arbor, Michigan		First	L 67–60 to Michigan
2019		Kress Events Center	Green Bay, Wisconsin		First	W 64–59 over Green Bay
2019		Hinkle Fieldhouse	Indianapolis		Second	L 70–52 to Butler
2022		Beeghly Center	Youngstown, Ohio		First	W 68–59 over Youngstown State
2022		Savage Arena	Toledo, Ohio		Second	L 79–59 to Toledo

== Coaches ==
Name	Years	Seasons	Overall	MAC	Accomplishments
Judy Devine	1975–1977	2	14–14 (.500)	—	—
Laurel Wartluft	1977–1986	9	135–119 (.531)	28–55 (.337)	1 NCAA tournament appearance
Richard Keast	1986–1989	3	33–50 (.378)	18–30 (.375)	—
Bob Lindsay	1989–2012	23	418–256 (.620)	260–120 (.684)	4 NCAA tournament appearances 3 WNIT appearances 5 MAC regular-season championships 5 MAC tournament championships 7 MAC East Division titles
Danielle O'Banion	2012–2016	4	21–98 (.176)	11–59 (.157)	—
Todd Starkey	2016–present	8	143–88 (.619)	85–59 (.590)	1 NCAA tournament appearance 3 WNIT appearances 1 MAC tournament championship 2 MAC East Division titles

== Awards ==
MAC Player of the Year
Name	Year(s)
Mary Bukovac	1989
Amy Sherry	1996, 1997
Dawn Zerman	2000
Lindsay Shearer	2006
Larissa Lurken	2017
MAC Freshman of the Year
Judi Dum	1984
Jennifer Grandstaff	1985
Tracey Lynn	1991
Rachel Larson	1993
Dawn Zerman	1997
MAC Defensive Player of the Year
Dawn Zerman	1998, 1999, 2000
Malika Willoughby	2005, 2006
MAC Sixth Player Award
La'kia Stewart	2006

Academic All-MAC First Team
Name	Year
Cheryl Lackey	1987
Cheryl Lackey	1988
Lynelle Richer	1992
Kyle Lathwell	1995
Amy Sherry	1995
Cindy Weisman	1995
Amy Sherry	1996
Carrie Templin	1996
Carrie Templin	1997
Carrie Templin	1998
Dawn Zerman	1999
Alana Bader	2000
Liz Beggs	2000
Jamie Rubis	2000
Julie Studer	2000
Amanda Wolke	2000
Dawn Zerman	2000
Liz Beggs	2001
Julie Studer	2001
Kate Miller	2002
Jamie Rubis	2002
Christi Shibata	2002
Valerie Zona	2002
Christi Shibata	2003
Lindsay Shearer	2004
Lindsay Shearer	2005
Lindsay Shearer	2006
Kerrie James	2007
Kristin Peoples	2007
Anna Kowalska	2009
Trisha Krewson	2012
Trisha Krewson	2013
Larissa Lurken	2015
Cici Shannon	2015
Krista White	2015
Naddiyah Cross	2016
Tyra James	2016
Jordan Korinek	2016
Larissa Lurken	2016
Alexa Golden	2017
Jordan Korinek	2017
Larissa Lurken	2017
McKenna Stephens	2017
Paige Salisbury	2017
Zenobia Bess	2018
Alexa Golden	2018
Tyra James	2018
Jordan Korinek	2018
Ali Poole	2018
McKenna Stephens	2018
Alexa Golden	2019
Ali Poole	2019
Sydney Brinlee	2020
Asiah Dingle	2020
Mariah Modkins	2020
Annie Pavlansky	2020
Lindsey Thall	2020
Hannah Young	2020
Nila Blackford	2021
Clare Kelly	2021
Linsey Marchese	2021
Mariah Modkins	2021
Annie Pavlansky	2021
Katie Shumate	2021

MAC Coach of the Year
Name	Year(s)
Bob Lindsay	1996, 1998
Todd Starkey	2017

=== All-Americans ===
All-America
Name	Year	Team
Bonnie Beachy	1981	Basketball Weekly Honorable Mention
Judi Dum	1987	American Women's Sports Federation Second Team
Amy Sherry	1995	Women’s Basketball News First Team; Basketball Times Honorable Mention; Associated Press Honorable Mention
Amy Sherry	1996	Basketball Times Honorable Mention
Dawn Zerman	1999	Kodak Honorable Mention
Dawn Zerman	2000	Women’s Basketball News Third Team; Associated Press Honorable Mention; Kodak Honorable Mention
Lindsay Shearer	2006	Women’s Basketball News Third Team; Kodak Honorable Mention
Academic All-America
Carrie Templin	1996	Third
Carrie Templin	1997	Second
Carrie Templin	1998	Second
Kate Miller	2002	First
Lindsay Shearer	2004	Third
Lindsay Shearer	2005	Second
Lindsay Shearer	2006	First; Player of the Year
Jordan Korinek; Larissa Lurken	2017	Second
Jordan Korinek	2018	First

=== Retired numbers ===
Number	Name	Tenure
13	Bonnie Beachy	1978–82

== Facilities ==
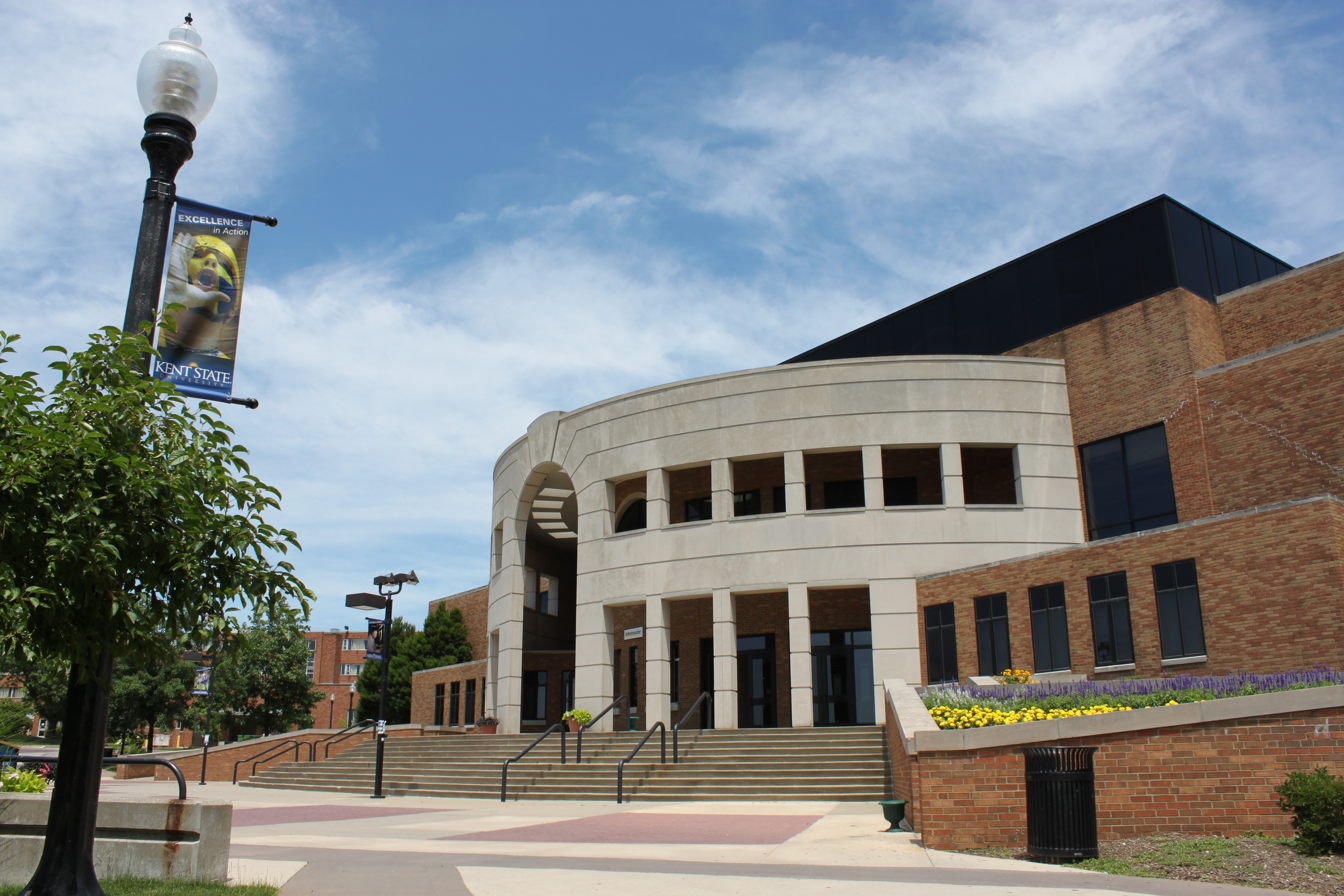
The MAC Center, the team's home since 1977

Home games are held in the 6,327-seat Memorial Athletic and Convocation Center, commonly known as the MAC Center, which is shared with the KSU men's basketball, wrestling, women's gymnastics, and women's volleyball teams. The MAC Center also houses the Kent State Athletic Department and has offices for all Kent State varsity athletic coaches. Additionally, the facility is used for commencement exercises, concerts, and other special events. The arena features a parquet floor and a central hanging scoreboard along with two video boards in opposite corners. It opened in 1950 and is the oldest arena the Mid-American Conference and 20th oldest in college basketball. The MAC Center has served as home of the Kent State women's basketball team since 1977.

For the team's first season in 1976, the Flashes played home games at Wills Gymnasium, which had previously served as the home of the men's basketball team from 1925 to 1950. By 1976, the seating capacity of Wills Gym had been reduced from the original 4,000 seats to around 100 and the building was in a dilapidated state. During the 1977 season, as part of the university complying with the requirements of Title IX, five of the seven scheduled home games were held at the MAC Center, then known as Memorial Gymnasium, with the remaining two at Wills. The first game played by the team in the MAC Center was on January 12, 1977, a season-opening 49–46 loss to Cleveland State. The Flashes recorded their first win at the MAC Center on February 2, 1977, a 64–62 win over Ashland. The team's final game at Wills was a 52–51 win over Wooster on February 12, 1977. Beginning in the 1977–78 season, all home games were moved to the MAC Center, which received its current name in 1992 following an extensive renovation. From 1997 through 2001, the team had a 43-game winning streak in the building, and posted a 50-game conference winning streak between 1996 and 2002. The record for largest crowd for a Kent State women's basketball game is 3,516, set on February 23, 2006, against the Miami RedHawks.

== Rivalries ==
Kent State vs. current Mid-American Conference teams through 2025–26
Team	Meetings	Wins–Losses	Percentage	Streak	First meeting
Akron	82	64–18	.780	W8	1976
Ball State	71	43–28	.606	L2	1979
Bowling Green	100	40–60	.400	W1	1976
Buffalo	61	37–24	.607	W1	1999
Central Michigan	71	38–33	.535	W1	1980
Eastern Michigan	77	49–28	.636	W9	1981
Massachusetts	6	1–5	.167	L5	1996
Miami	104	53–51	.510	L2	1976
Northern Illinois	51	32–19	.627	W2	1982
Ohio	98	61–37	.622	L1	1976
Toledo	87	36–51	.414	L1	1976
Western Michigan	66	38–28	.576	W4	1980
Kent State vs. non-conference rivals
Cleveland State	28	16–13	.552	L2	1976
Youngstown State	46	32–14	.696	W5	1976

The Golden Flashes' arch-rival is the Akron Zips from the University of Akron, a fellow member of the Mid-American Conference East Division and a traditional rival in multiple sports, located approximately 10 miles (16 km) southwest of Kent in Akron, Ohio. The Zips and Flashes first met during Kent State's final year as a club team and met for the first official time as varsity teams on February 14, 1976, at Memorial Hall in Akron during Kent State's first season as a varsity team. The Zips won the inaugural varsity meeting 73–67 and the two teams played in every successive season except for the 1982–83 and 1988–89 seasons. Akron joined the Mid-American Conference in 1992, giving the rivals two meetings per season.

For many years, the rivalry was one-sided in favor of the Golden Flashes. Following the 2008 games, both Kent State wins, the Flashes built a 43–4 lead in the series, which included a run from 1989 to 2008 where they won 23 of 24, among them five games where the Flashes had 100 or more points in the game. Akron won at James A. Rhodes Arena in 1998 to end a 15-game Kent State winning streak in the series that began in 1989. Kent State won the rematch in 1998 when the teams met in Kent to start an 18-game series winning streak that ended in 2009 with a Zips win in Akron. Between 2009 and 2016, the Zips took 11 of 16 meetings, including eight in a row before Kent State won both games in 2017. Akron won for the first time in the MAC Center since 1988 with a 77–71 win in 2013, ending a 20-game losing streak in the building. The win also marked the first time the Zips not only won consecutive games, but also swept the season meetings in the series. Through the 2025–26 season, the series stands at 64–18 in favor of Kent State. The game is also part of the multi-sport Wagon Wheel Challenge.

Kent State also had a long-standing rivalry with the Toledo Rockets during much of the 1990s and early 2000s as the teams were regularly in contention for the conference championship and met yearly in games with conference championship implications. The two teams consistently finished first and second in the mid-1990s with Kent State taking the regular-season titles over second-place Toledo in 1996, 1998, and 2000, and the Flashes finishing second to the Rockets in 1997 and 2001. Both teams split their meetings during the 1999 regular season and tied for the title. Kent State has played Toledo in the Mid-American Conference women's basketball tournament championship game seven times, the first in 1992 and then again for six consecutive seasons from 1996 through 2001. The Rockets have taken five of the seven championship game meetings and took four of the six from 1996 to 2001. Through 2025–26, Toledo leads the overall series 51–36.

Outside the Mid-American Conference, Kent State has played regional rivals Cleveland State and Youngstown State more frequently than any other teams, with both series dating back to 1976 during the Flashes' inaugural varsity season. Both the Vikings and Penguins are members of the Horizon League and play the Flashes on a semi-regular basis. Through the 2023–24 season, Kent State has played Cleveland State 29 times, with the most recent game in 2015. The Flashes lead the series 16–13 following a 60–49 Cleveland State win in Kent. The Flashes' series with Youngstown State spans 45 games and was last played in 2022. Kent State leads the series with YSU 32–14 following a 68–59 KSU win at Youngstown in the opening round of the 2022 Women's National Invitation Tournament.

== People ==
- June Daugherty, head coach of the Washington State Cougars women's basketball team. Daugherty served as an assistant coach for the Flashes from 1983 to 1985.
- Brenda Frese, head coach of the Maryland Terrapins women's basketball team since 2003, which won the 2006 NCAA National Championship. Frese began her coaching career as an assistant on the Kent State women's basketball team in 1993, and served as an assistant for the 1993–94 and 1994–95 seasons.
