= Eastern Michigan Eagles women's basketball =

Woman's basketball team of Eastern Michigan University

2026–27 Eastern Michigan Eagles women's basketball team
- University: Eastern Michigan University
- First season: 1977; 49 years ago
- Head coach: Sahar Nusseibeh (3rd season)
- Location: Ypsilanti, Michigan
- Arena: George Gervin GameAbove Center (capacity: 8,800)
- Conference: Mid-American
- Nickname: Eagles
- Colors: Green and white

NCAA Division I tournament appearances
- 2004, 2012

Conference tournament champions
- 2004, 2012

Conference regular-season champions
- 2004, 2012

Uniforms
Home	Away

The Eastern Michigan Eagles women's basketball team represents Eastern Michigan University, in Ypsilanti, Michigan, in women's basketball. At the team's establishment in 1977 the team was known as the Hurons, and it, along with all EMU teams, became known as the Eagles in 1991.

== Season-by-season record ==
As of the end of the 2015–16 season, the Eagles had a 550–563 record, with a 265–318 record in the Mid-American Conference, which they have played in since 1981. Suzy Merchant has the best record as coach, going 147–91 in nine years before stepping down as coach due to pregnancy four games into the 2006–07 season. The Eagles have won the West Division of the Mid-American conference five times, in 2004, 2006, 2008 and 2012. They won two MAC Tournament titles in that span, one in 2004 and the other in 2012, which are their only appearances in the NCAA Division I women's basketball tournament. In 2012, the Eagles defeated their rival, the Central Michigan Chippewas, 72–71 on a layup by Paige Reddit with only 1.5 seconds left on the game clock to win. They have also reached the WNIT in 2006, 2010, 2011, 2015, and 2016, with an appearance in the Women's Basketball Invitational in 2014.

Season	Record	Conference record	Coach
1976–77	13–8	--	Kathy Hart
1977–78	14–6	--	Kathy Hart
1978-78	11–11	--	Kathy Hart
1979–80	14–10	--	Kathy Hart
1980–81	15–12	--	Kathy Hart
1981–82	16–10	8–4	Kathy Hart
1982–83	13–14	9–9	Kathy Hart
1983–84	13–14	8–10	Kathy Hart
1984–85	11–14	9–9	Kathy Hart
1985–86	13–12	8–10	Kathy Hart
1986–87	13–13	8–8	Kathy Hart
1987–88	6–19	2–14	Cheryl Getz
1988–89	8–19	4–12	Cheryl Getz
1989–90	8–20	5–11	Cheryl Getz
1990–91	12–15	8–8	Cheryl Getz
1991–92	12–16	6–10	Cheryl Getz
1992–93	3–22	2–16	Dana Munk
1993–94	1–24	0–18	Paulette Stein
1994–95	4–22	1–17	Paulette Stein
1995–96	6–20	2–16	Paulette Stein
1996–97	8–18	5–13	Paulette Stein
1997–98	10–16	5–14	Paulette Stein
1998–99	14–13	8–8	Suzy Merchant
1999-00	16–14	8–8	Suzy Merchant
2000–01	16–12	9–7	Suzy Merchant
2001–02	18–11	10–6	Suzy Merchant
2002–03	13–16	9–7	Suzy Merchant
2003–04	22–8	12–4	Suzy Merchant
2004–05	23–8	11–5	Suzy Merchant
2005–06	22–8	15–1	Suzy Merchant
2006–07	16–13	11–5	Suzy Merchant and Shane Clipfell
2007–08	17–12	11–5	AnnMarie Gilbert
2008–09	8–21	4–12	AnnMarie Gilbert
2009–10	22–9	11–5	AnnMarie Gilbert
2010–11	24–13	10–6	AnnMarie Gilbert
2011–12	23–9	13–3	AnnMarie Gilbert
2012–13	8–22	6–10	Tory Verdi
2013–14	18–14	7–11	Tory Verdi
2014–15	24–13	11–7	Tory Verdi
2015–16	22–12	10–8	Tory Verdi
2016–17	6–25	1–17	Fred Castro
2017–18	11–20	6–12	Fred Castro
2018–19	14–17	6–12	Fred Castro
2019–20	16–15	9–9	Fred Castro
2020–21	10–10	7–7	Fred Castro
2021–22	7–20	4–16	Fred Castro
2022–23	15–15	7–11	Fred Castro
2023–24	7–22	3-15	Fred Castro
2024–25	2–27	1-17	Sahar Nusseibeh
2025–26	13–16	6–12	Sahar Nusseibeh

=== NCAA tournament results ===
Year	Seed	Round	Opponent	Result
2004	#14	First Round	#3 Boston College	L 56–58
2012	#12	First Round	#5 South Carolina	L 48–80

=== WNIT results ===
Year	Round	Opponent	Result
2006	Second Round	Indiana State	L 57-79
2010	First Round	Purdue	L 50-56
2011	First Round Second Round Regional Semifinals	Michigan UNC Wilmington Syracuse	W 67-59 W 63-54 L 63-72
2015	First Round Second Round Regional Semifinals	Drake Tulsa Southern Mississippi	W 80-70 W 69-59 L 65-76
2015	First Round Second Round	Saint Mary's TCU	W 74-73 L 81-85
