= Ball State Cardinals women's basketball =

2026–27 Ball State Cardinals women's basketball team
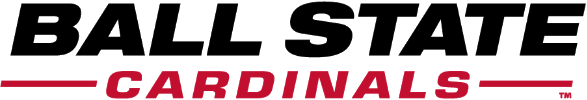
- University: Ball State University
- Head coach: Brady Sallee (15th season)
- Location: Muncie, Indiana
- Arena: Worthen Arena (capacity: 11,500)
- Conference: Mid-American
- Nickname: Cardinals
- Colors: Cardinal and white

NCAA Division I tournament second round
- 2009

NCAA Division I tournament appearances
- 2009, 2025

Conference tournament champions
- 2009, 2025

Conference regular-season champions
- 2002, 2003, 2025, 2026

Conference division champions
- 2002, 2003, 2007, 2008, 2009, 2015

Uniforms
Home	Away

The Ball State Cardinals women's basketball team represents the Ball State University in women's basketball. The school competes in the Mid-American Conference in Division I of the National Collegiate Athletic Association (NCAA). The Cardinals play home basketball games at Worthen Arena on the Ball State campus in Muncie, Indiana.

== Season-by-season record ==
As of the 2023–24 season, the Cardinals have a 665–708 record, with a 355–369 record in the Mid-American Conference. Ball State has won the Mid-American Conference women's basketball tournament twice, in 2009 and 2025, while finishing as runner-up in 2002, 2003, 2007, and 2014. In their first appearance in the NCAA Tournament, the Cardinals (ranked as a 12 seed) beat the 5th seeded Tennessee Lady Volunteers 71–55, the first ever loss for the Lady Vols in the first round. They lost in the second round to Iowa State 71–57.

They have won the MAC West Division in 2002, 2003, 2007, 2008, 2009, and 2015 while finishing as regular season champions in 2002, 2003, and 2025. They have made 11 appearances in the Women's National Invitation Tournament (2002, 2003, 2007, 2013, 2014, 2015, 2016, 2017, 2018, 2022, and 2023), with a WNIT Final 16 appearance in 2013 and a Second Round appearance in 2016, 2018, and 2023. On December 21, 2017, the Cardinals defeated Western Kentucky and remained undefeated in non-conference play for the first time in school history.

Season	Record	Conference record	Coach
1974–75	17–6	n/a	Rosalie DiBrezzo
1975–76	13–6	n/a	Rosalie DiBrezzo
1976–77	5–8	n/a	Debbie Powers
1977–78	7–6	n/a	Sue Tussey
1978–79	5–11	n/a	Debbie Powers
1979–80	6–13	n/a	Debbie Powers
1980–81	9–14	n/a	Debbie Powers
1981–82	8–14	3–4	Debbie Powers
1982–83	7–17	5–13	Karen Fitzpatrick
1983–84	4–21	2–16	Karen Fitzpatrick
1984–85	6–21	4–14	Karen Fitzpatrick
1985–86	13–14	9–9	Marsha Reall
1986–87	4–23	2–14	Ethel Gregory
1987–88	6–21	4–12	Ethel Gregory
1988–89	12–15	7–9	Ethel Gregory
1989–90	17–11	9–7	Ethel Gregory
1990–91	7–20	3–13	Ethel Gregory
1991–92	5–22	3–13	Ethel Gregory
1992–93	3–23	3–15	Robyn Markey
1993–94	6–20	4–14	Robyn Markey
1994–95	7–18	3–15	Robyn Markey
1995–96	6–20	3–15	Robyn Markey
1996–97	13–13	11–7	Robyn Markey
1997–98	10–16	7–11	Robyn Markey
1998–99	9–17	6–10	Robyn Markey
1999-00	16–13	8–8	Brenda Oldfield
2000–01	19–9	11–5	Brenda Oldfield
2001–02	24–8	13–3	Tracy Roller
2002–03	21–10	12–4	Tracy Roller
2003–04	13–16	7–9	Tracy Roller
2004–05	16–13	11–5	Tracy Roller
2005–06	17–12	9–7	Tracy Roller
2006–07	24–7	13–3	Tracy Roller
2007–08	15–15	11–5	Tracy Roller (3–7) and Lisa McDonald (12–8)
2008–09	26–9	14–2	Kelly Packard
2009–10	14–17	7–9	Kelly Packard
2010–11	9–21	4–12	Kelly Packard
2011–12	9–21	4–12	Kelly Packard
2012–13	17–16	12–4	Brady Sallee
2013–14	18–17	9–9	Brady Sallee
2014–15	17–14	13–5	Brady Sallee
2015–16	22–10	13–5	Brady Sallee
2016–17	21–11	14–4	Brady Sallee
2017–18	25–7	13–5	Brady Sallee
2018–19	8–23	3–15	Brady Sallee
2019–20	21–10	13–5	Brady Sallee
2020–21	14–11	12–8	Brady Sallee
2021–22	20–13	11–8	Brady Sallee
2022–23	26–9	14–4	Brady Sallee
2023–24	28–6	16–2	Brady Sallee
2024–25	27–8	16–2	Brady Sallee
2025–26	26–7	16–2	Brady Sallee
Overall	692–716	371–372	

== Postseason appearances ==
=== NCAA Division I Tournament appearances ===
Ball State has appeared in the NCAA Division I women's basketball tournament twice. Their record is 1–2.

Year	Seed	Round	Opponent	Result
2009	#12	First Round; Second Round	#5 Tennessee #4 Iowa State	W 71–55; L 57–71
2025	#12	First Round	#5 Ole Miss	L 83-65

=== WBIT ===
The Cardinals have appeared in the Women's Basketball Invitation Tournament once. Their record is 0–1.

Year	Seed	Round	Opponent	Result
2024	#4	First	Belmont	L 77–59

=== WNIT ===
The Cardinals have appeared in the Women's National Invitation Tournament eleven times. Their record is 7–11.

*- Overtime game

Year	Round	Opponent	Result
2002	First	Louisville	W 95–84
2002	Second	Valparaiso	L 77–69
2003	First	Indiana State	W 91–87 *
2003	Second	Missouri	L 88–77
2007	Round 2	Kentucky	L 85–82
2013	First	Minnesota	W 54–51
2013	Second	Northern Iowa	W 53–48
2013	Third	Kansas State	L 60–48
2014	Round 1	Northwestern	L 69–65
2015	Round 1	Middle Tennessee	L 69–58
2016	Round 1	Iowa	W 77–72
2016	Round 2	St. Louis	L 59–57
2017	Round 1	Indiana	L 71–58
2018	Round 1	Middle Tennessee	W 69–60
2018	Round 2	Purdue	L 77–72
2022	Round 1	Marquette	L 93–70
2023	Round 1	Belmont	W 101–86
2023	Round 2	Memphis	L 79–62
