= Western Michigan Broncos =

Intercollegiate sports teams of Western Michigan University

- University: Western Michigan University
- Nickname: Broncos
- NCAA: Division I (FBS)
- Conference: Mid-American (primary); MVC (men's soccer); NCHC (men's hockey)
- Athletic director: Alex Gary
- Location: Kalamazoo, Michigan
- Varsity teams: 15
- Football stadium: Waldo Stadium
- Basketball arena: University Arena
- Ice hockey arena: Lawson Arena
- Baseball stadium: Hyames Field
- Softball stadium: Ebert Field
- Soccer stadium: WMU Soccer Complex
- Colors: Brown and gold
- Mascot: Buster Bronco
- Website: wmubroncos.com
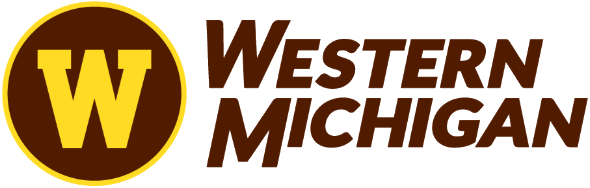

The Western Michigan Broncos are a National Collegiate Athletic Association (NCAA) Division I program representing Western Michigan University (WMU) in college athletics. They compete in the Mid-American Conference in men's baseball, basketball, football, and tennis, and women's basketball, golf, gymnastics, soccer, softball, cross country, track and field, tennis, and volleyball. Additionally, the men's ice hockey team competes in the National Collegiate Hockey Conference and the men's soccer team competes in the Missouri Valley Conference. The Broncos also have a flight team, the SkyBroncos, who have won the National Intercollegiate Flying Association (NIFA) National Championship award five times.

The Broncos have won three NCAA national championships. The men's cross country team won the Division I NCAA title in 1964 and 1965, and the ice hockey team won the Division I NCAA title in 2025.

Athletic facilities at Western Michigan include Waldo Stadium (football), University Arena (men's and women's basketball, volleyball), Lawson Arena (hockey), Hyames Field (baseball), Ebert Field (softball), Sorensen Courts/West Hills Athletic Club (men's and women's tennis), the Kanley Track (women's track and field), and the WMU Soccer Complex (men's and women's soccer).

The school's primary rival is Central Michigan University.

== History ==
WMU athletic teams were once known as the Hilltoppers, a reference to the school's location on top of Prospect Hill, but changed their nickname in 1939 to the Broncos to avoid confusion with teams of other schools such as the Western Kentucky Hilltoppers. John Gill, an assistant coach on the football team who later served as head coach, coined the new athletic nickname after approval for the name change was granted by the school's athletic board.

== Varsity sports ==
A member of the Mid-American Conference, Western Michigan sponsors teams in 6 men's and 9 women's NCAA sanctioned sports.

Western Michigan is a member of the Mid-American Conference

Men's sports	Women's sports
Baseball	Basketball
Basketball	Cross country
Football	Golf
Ice hockey (Note: The hockey team competes as a member of the National Collegiate Hockey Conference.)	Gymnastics
Soccer (Note: The men's soccer team competes as a member of the Missouri Valley Conference.)	Soccer
Tennis	Softball
	Tennis
	Track and field^{†}
	Volleyball
† – Track and field includes both indoor and outdoor.

=== Baseball ===
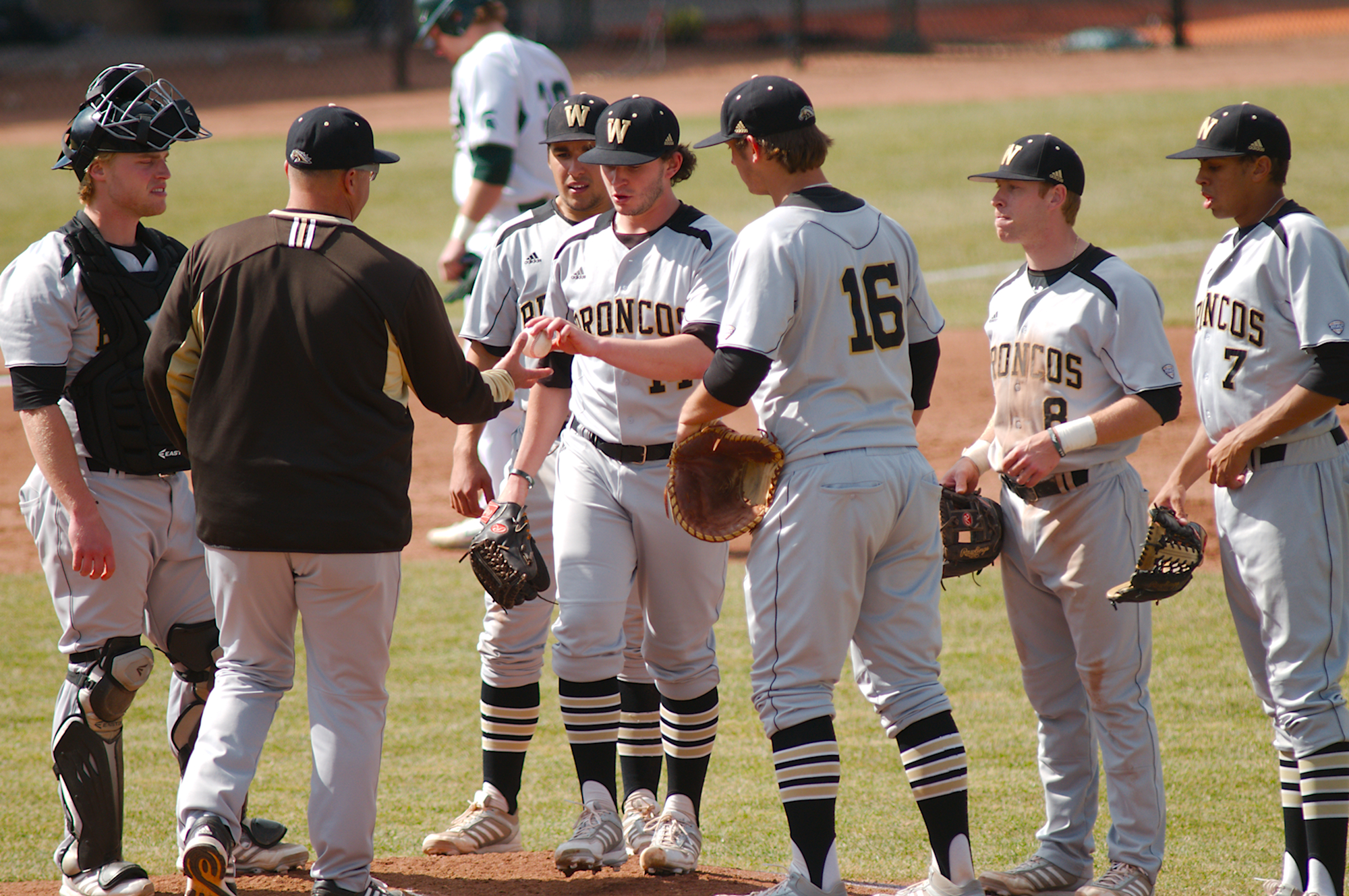
Broncos baseball coach Billy Gernon conducts a pitching change during a 2014 game against Michigan State

The baseball team has represented WMU since its first season in 1911, compiling an overall record of 1,822–1349–23 (.574) through 2012. They have appeared in the College World Series six times, most recently in 1963. In the 1955 College World Series, WMU finished as the NCAA runner-up, losing to Wake Forest 7–6 in the championship game.

WMU has won 15 Mid-American Conference Baseball championships, including 13 of 19 from 1949 to 1967 and most recently, the conference tournament in 2024.

The Broncos are coached by Billy Gernon.

=== Football ===
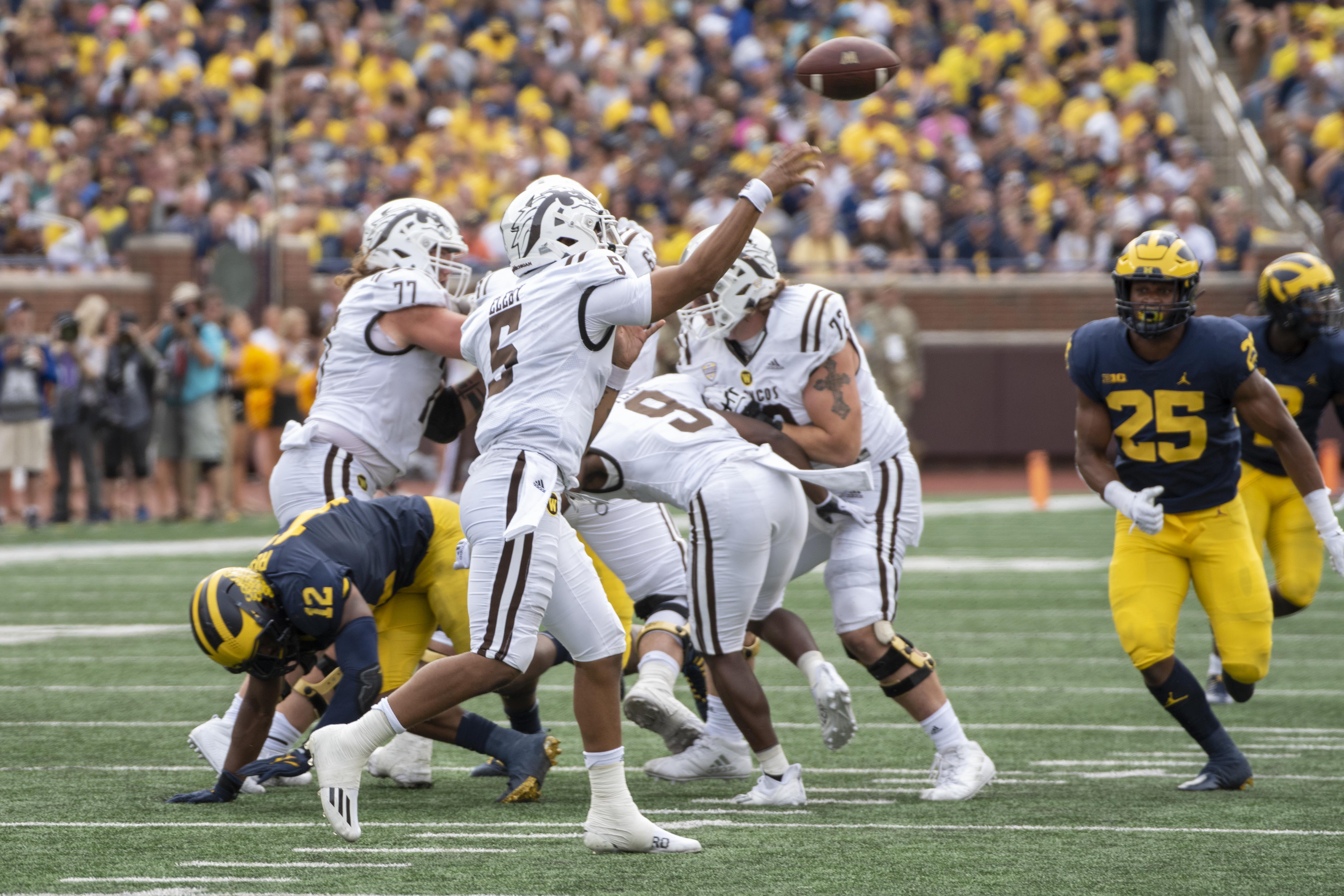
Kaleb Eleby throws a pass against the Michigan Wolverines, 2021

The Western Michigan Broncos football team represents Western Michigan University (WMU) in NCAA Division I Football Bowl Subdivision (FBS) competition. Based in Kalamazoo, Michigan, the team competes in the Mid-American Conference (MAC) and has been a member since 1948. The Broncos were established in 1906 and have developed a strong regional presence over the decades. They have claimed a total of four MAC championships—in 1966, 1976, 1988, and most recently in 2016 under head coach P.J. Fleck. Waldo Stadium, their home since 1939, has been the site of many memorable games and is known for its rowdy student section and intimate atmosphere.

Western Michigan's most historic season came in 2016 when the team completed a perfect 13–0 regular season, winning the MAC Championship and earning a spot in the Cotton Bowl Classic—one of the prestigious New Year’s Six bowl games. This marked the Broncos' first-ever appearance in a New Year’s Six bowl and brought national attention to the program. Although they fell to Wisconsin 24–16, the season is widely regarded as the pinnacle of Western Michigan football history. That year, P.J. Fleck's "Row the Boat" mantra became a symbol of the team’s unity and resilience, solidifying the 2016 Broncos as one of the greatest squads in MAC history.

Lance Taylor became WMU's head football coach in 2023. The Broncos bested the Miami University - Ohio Red Hawks 23 - 13 to win the MAC Championship at Ford Field on December 6, 2025.

=== Hockey ===
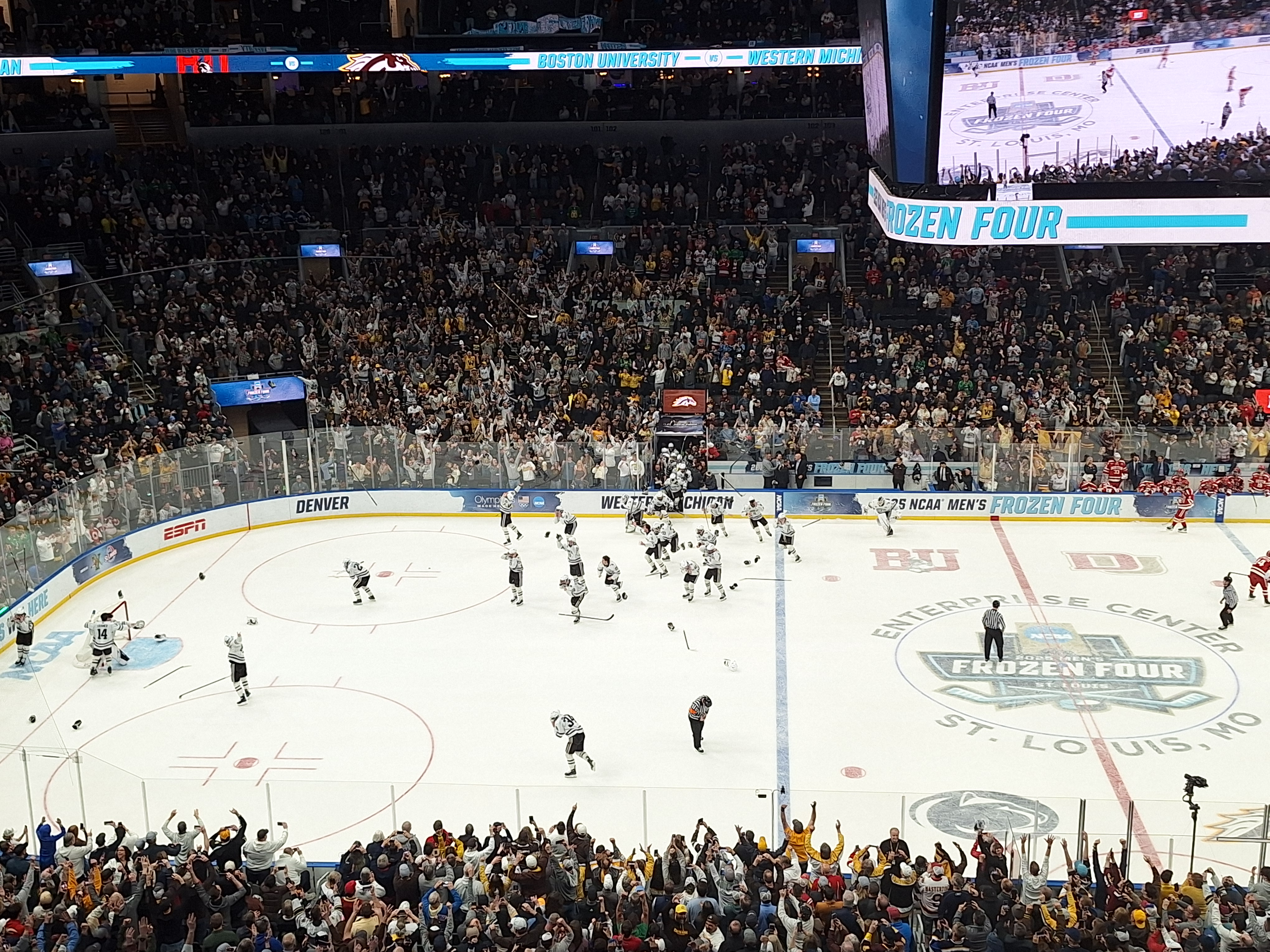
Western Michigan celebrates first-ever national championship

The Western Michigan Broncos men's ice hockey team, founded in 1973, represents Western Michigan University in NCAA Division I play and has grown into one of the nation's respected programs. Originally a member of the Central Collegiate Hockey Association (CCHA), the Broncos claimed their first CCHA Tournament Championship in 1986, earning their inaugural NCAA Tournament appearance. Now competing in the powerhouse National Collegiate Hockey Conference (NCHC), Western Michigan has made several NCAA Tournament appearances over the years, including a resurgence in the 2010s and 2020s under strong leadership. The pinnacle of the program's history came in 2025, when the Broncos captured their first NCAA National Championship defeating Boston University 6-2, a landmark achievement that cemented their status among college hockey’s elite.

=== Basketball ===
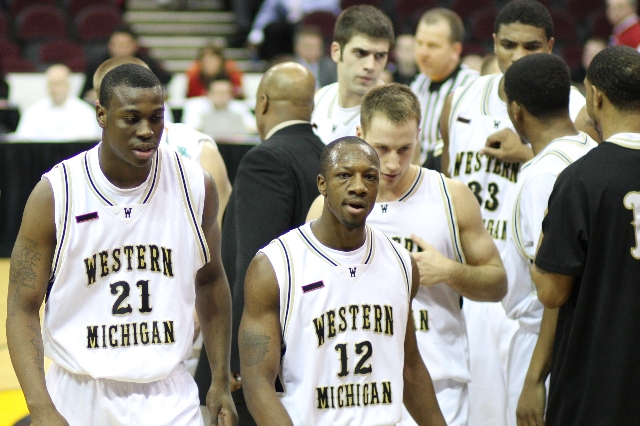
Western Michigan Broncos men's basketball team, 2008

The Western Michigan Broncos men's basketball team began play in the 1913-14 season coached by William H. Spaulding. Since 1957, they have played their home games at University Arena. They have made four appearances in the NCAA Division I tournament.

The Western Michigan Broncos women's basketball team began play in the 1967-68 season. They play their home games at University Arena. They have made two appearances in the NCAA Division I tournament.

=== Soccer (men's) ===
The men's soccer team won the MAC tournament championship in 2003 and 2022. They are coached by Chad Wiseman. A famous former player is Rob Friend, who transferred to the University of California, Santa Barbara's Men's Soccer program. He plays in Major League Soccer (MLS) for the LA Galaxy, as well as the Canadian National Team.

The Broncos moved men's soccer to the Missouri Valley Conference in 2023, following the MAC discontinuing sponsorship of men's soccer after the 2022 season.

=== Soccer (women's) ===
On November 9, 2013, Western Michigan women's soccer team won the Mid-American Conference tournament championship and a trip to the NCAA tournament. The MAC Championship is the second for the program, coming 10 years from the first one in 2003.

=== Softball ===
The Bronco softball team has appeared in three Women's College World Series, in 1980, 1981 and 1982.

=== Volleyball ===
The volleyball team has been competing at Western Michigan University since 1965. In that span, the team has won 10 MAC regular season championships (1982, 1983, 1984, 1985, 1986, 1987, 1988, 2000, 2008 and 2023) and 8 MAC tournament championships (1982, 1987, 1988, 1989, 2000, 2014, 2023 and 2024). Through the 2025 season, WMU's all-time overall record is 1132–810–9 (.583) and conference record is 470–232 (.670).

The Broncos are coached by Colleen Munson, who became the program's all-time winningest head coach with her 332nd career victory on November 21, 2021 in a MAC Tournament win over Toledo, passing Rob Buck (331-179-9). In her eighteen years at WMU, she has compiled a 417–252(.623) record, second only to Buck (.646), who also holds the Mid-American Conference career winning percentage record for in-conference matches (125-19, .868).

WMU won the MAC regular season championship the first eight seasons it was in existence without losing a match, compiling an 86–0 record.

In 2013, the Broncos went undefeated in the league (18–0) and went on to win the tournament championship. They defeated No.7 seeded Auburn in the first round of the 2023 NCAA Division I women's volleyball tournament before falling to No. 2 Louisville. In 2024, WMU won back-to-back MAC Tournament titles, becoming the first team since Ohio in 2009-10 to win the conference tournament in consecutive seasons.

==== NCAA tournament results ====
Season	Round	Seed	Rival	Result
1982	First round (28 teams)	–	at No. 12 BYU	L 3–0 (15–10, 15–7, 15–7)
1983	First round (28 teams)	–	vs. No. 7 Nebraska	W 3–1 (9–15, 15–12, 15–12, 15–8)
1983	Regional semifinal (16 teams)	–	at No. 10 Purdue	W 3–2 (15–3, 9–15, 15–9, 14–16, 15–10)
1983	Regional final (8 teams)	–	at No. 3 UCLA	L 3–0 (15–6, 15–8, 15–12)
1984	First round (28 teams)	–	at No. 12 Illinois State	W 3–1 (15–13, 9–15, 15–8, 17–15)
1984	Regional semifinal (16 teams)	–	at No. 7 Nebraska	L 1–3 (12–15, 10–15, 15–8, 7–15)
1985	First round (28 teams)	–	at No. 10 Illinois	L, 1–3 (9–15, 11–15, 15–12, 12–15)
1986	First round (32 teams)	–	at No. 19 Colorado State	W, 3–0 (16–14, 15–2, 15–12)
1986	Regional semifinal (16 teams)	–	at No. 12 Illinois	L, 0–3 (5–15, 10–15, 4–15)
1987	First round (32 teams)	–	at Oklahoma	W, 3–0 (15–3, 15–8, 15–9)
1987	Regional semifinal (16 teams)	–	at No. 7 Illinois	L, 2–3 (11–15, 15–9, 7–15, 15–12, 10–15)
1988	First round (32 teams)	–	at No. 7 Texas	L, 0–3 (10–15, 14–16, 3–15)
2000	First round (64 teams)	–	vs. Northern Iowa	L, 1–3 (14–16, 15–8, 7–15, 8–15)
2008	First round (64 teams)	–	at Dayton	W, 3–1 (21–25, 26–24, 25–23, 25–18)
2008	Second round (32 teams)	–	vs. No. 16 Tulane	W, 3–2 (20–25, 25–21, 13–25, 25–19, 15–12)
2008	Regional semifinals (16 teams)	–	at No. 1 Penn State	L, 0–3 (17–25, 12–25, 19–25)
2011	First round (64 teams)	–	vs. No. 11 Washington	L, 1–3 (13–25, 25–20, 22–25, 25–16)
2014	First round (64 teams)	–	vs. No. 4 Wisconsin	L, 0–3 (9–24, 24–26, 10–25)
2023	First round (64 teams)	–	vs. No. 7 Auburn	W 3–0 (25–18, 25–17, 25–19)
2023	Second round (32 teams)	–	at No. 2 Louisville	L 3–0 (26–24, 25–18, 25–22)
2024	First round (64 teams)	–	at No. 4 Purdue	L 3–0 (25–20 25–17, 25–19)

=== Other varsity sports ===
The men's cross country team won the NCAA Division I Championship in 1964 and 1965, and finished as national runners up in 1958. While the men's cross country and track program isn't currently active, as it was a casualty of cost-cutting measures by then President Judith Bailey in the 2003-04 school year, their accomplishments are recognized, and the 1964 and 1965 teams were inducted into the university's athletic hall of fame. The university did consider reinstating the men's program in 2009, after then President John Dunn agreed to offer a proposal to the Board of Trustees, pending a first year financial commitment of $300,000 and a willingness to support the program on a recurring basis through contributions and estate planning. One of the co-signers, and leading vocal proponents of the proposal, was former Broncos track coach George Dales, who coached the 1964, and 1965 national championship teams, the 1958 runner up team, and also lead the Broncos to a collective 9 MAC Championships from 1953 until his retirement from coaching in 1970. It was stated in November 2009, by then acting athletics director Kathy Beauregard, that even if the potential financial goals were met and further, the program was given approval by the Board of Trustees after a meeting with administration in December of that year, it would not be able to be reinstated by the 2010-11 school year. The school ended up not going through with the initiative as of 2025. Dales died in 2017, at the age of 96.

The women's gymnastics team won the MAC Championship in 1986, 1987, 2006, 2013 and 2024. The team was Co-Champions with Central Michigan University after tying scores in 2013.

In October 2007, the women's track and field sprint medley relay was ranked #1 in the NCAA by Track and Field News.

The men's tennis team has won both the MAC Championship and regular season championship a record 26 times, with their last MAC Championship coming in 2022 and first being in 1950. In 1999, the format of the MAC Men's Tennis Championship changed as the Mid-American Conference introduced East and West divisions. A new tournament was introduced switching from a Championship competition based around a cumulative school's score of won matches of individual players singles and doubles games; to a best of 4 games, single-elimination match tournament with rostered teams, with consolation matches to determine lower rankings. In first year of the new tournament, after besting the University of Toledo team in the First Round, and surpassing the team from Miami University, which hosted the tournament, in the Semifinal match; the Broncos beat the team from Ball State University in the inaugural Championship match, 4 games to 2. This performance won the Broncos their first MAC Men's Tennis Championship since 1981, and the first under the new tournament format for any member school of the MAC. Since 1999, they have won 14 MAC Championships, more than any other school in the Mid-American Conference.

== Awards ==
For the 2010–11 season, WMU was awarded the Cartwright Award, given to one MAC program each season for excellence in academics, athletics and citizenship. That same season, WMU won the Jacoby Trophy (most successful women's program) and finished second for the Reese Trophy (most successful men's program).

== Championships ==
=== NCAA Division I National Championships ===
Sport	Number of championships	Year
Cross Country (Men's)	2	1964, 1965
Hockey	1	2025

=== Mid-American Conference Regular Season & Tournament championships ===
- Baseball (16 total MAC & regular season championships)
  - Regular season championships (14): 1989 • 1967 • 1966 • 1963 • 1962 • 1961 • 1959 • 1958 • 1957 • 1955 • 1952 • 1951 • 1950 • 1949
  - Tournament (2): 2024 • 2016
- Basketball (Men's) (13)
  - Regular season championships (11): 2013–14 (West Division) • 2012–13 (West Division) • 2010–11 (West Division) • 2008–09 (West Division) • 2007–08 (West Division) • 2004–05 (West Division) • 2003–04 (West Division) • 1997–98 (West Division) • 1980–81 • 1975–76 • 1951–52
  - Tournament (2): 2014 • 2004
- Basketball (Women's) (3)
  - Regular season championship (1): 1999–2000 (West Division)
  - Tournament (2): 2003 • 1985
- Cross Country (Men's) (14)
  - MAC Championships (14): 1980 • 1979 • 1977 • 1976 • 1970 • 1968 • 1966 • 1963 • 1961 • 1960 • 1959 • 1958 • 1957 • 1948
- Cross Country (Women's) (4)
  - MAC Championships (4): 1993 • 1986 • 1985 • 1984
- Football (8)
  - MAC Conference Championships: 2025 • 2016 • 1988 • 1966 (Co-Champion)
  - MAC West Division Titles (1997-2023) (3): 2016 • 2015 (Co-West Division) • 2000 (Co-West Division) • 1999
- Golf (Men's) (1)
  - MAC Championships: 1949
- Gymnastics (4)
  - Regular season championships (3): 2023 • 2020 • 2006
  - MAC Championships (5): 2024 • 2013 (tied) • 2006 • 1987 • 1986
- Soccer (Men's) (1)
  - Regular season championship: None
  - Tournament (1): 2003
- Soccer (Women's) (8)
  - Regular season championship (3):: 2023 • 2024 • 2025
  - Tournament (5): 2003 • 2013 • 2015 • 2024 • 2025
- Softball (4)
  - Regular season championship (3): 2006 • 1984 (Western Division) • 1983 (Western Division)
  - Tournament (1): 2003
- Swimming and Diving (Men's) (2)
  - Regular season: 1964 • 1963
  - MAC Championships: None
- Tennis (Men's) (52)
  - Regular season championships (26): 2024 • 2022 • 2021 • 2019 • 2018 • 2016 • 2011 • 2009 • 2008 • 2007 • 2004 • 2000 (tied) • 1999 • 1981 • 1965 • 1964 (tied) • 1963 • 1962 • 1961 • 1960 • 1959 • 1958 • 1957 • 1956 (tied) • 1955 • 1954 • 1952 • 1950
  - Total MAC Championships (tournament & singles/doubles) (26): 2022 • 2019 • 2018 • 2016 • 2013 • 2012 • 2010 • 2009 • 2008 • 2007 • 2006 • 2004 • 2001 • 1999 • 1981 • 1965 • 1963 • 1962 • 1961 • 1960 • 1959 • 1958 • 1957 • 1955 • 1954 • 1952 • 1950
  - MAC Championship | Singles/Doubles (12): 1981 • 1965 • 1963 • 1962 • 1961 • 1960 • 1959 • 1958 • 1957 • 1955 • 1954 • 1952 • 1950
  - MAC Championship | Tournament (14): 2022 • 2019 • 2018 • 2016 • 2013 • 2012 • 2010 • 2009 • 2008 • 2007 • 2006 • 2004 • 2001 • 1999
- Tennis (Women's) (15)
  - Regular season championships (11): 2008 • 2007 • 2006 • 2005 • 2001 • 2000 • 1999 • 1997 • 1995 • 1990 • 1984
  - Tournament (4): 2007 • 2006 • 2000 • 1999
- Track and Field (Men's) (18)
  - Regular season championships (18): 1996 • 1995 • 1985 • 1980 • 1976 • 1971 • 1970 • 1969 • 1968 • 1966 • 1965 • 1964 • 1963 • 1962 • 1961 • 1960 • 1959 • 1958
  - Tournament: None
- Track and Field (Women's) (2)
  - Regular season championships (2): 1987 • 1985
  - Tournament: None
- Volleyball (15)
  - Regular season championships (11): 2009 (West Division) • 2008 (West Division) • 2007 (West Division) • 2000 (West Division) • 1988 • 1987 • 1986 • 1985 • 1984 • 1983 • 1982
  - Tournament (4): 2000 • 1989 • 1988 • 1987

=== CCHA tournament championships ===
- Ice Hockey (Men's) (2): 1986 • 2012

=== NCHC championships ===
- Ice Hockey (Men's) (2)
  - Regular season (1): 2025
  - Tournament (1): 2025

== Non-varsity sports ==
=== Synchronized skating ===
Although the sport of synchronized skating is not an official NCAA sport Western Michigan is home to an internationally competitive synchronized skating team, who have medaled at competitions around the world. The Bronco's synchronized skating program consists of a senior team, which competes internationally as well as a collegiate level team which is competitive among the top university and collegiate teams from around the United States. The team lost their athletic funding and Varsity status along with Men's Cross Country and Track & Field in the 2003–2004 competitive season, and became a Club sport.

=== Rugby ===
Founded in 1990, Western Michigan plays college rugby in the Mid-American Conference of Division 1AA. The Broncos reached the MAC semifinals in 2014. Recently, the men's rugby team qualified for the D1AA XV's Fall Playoff Nationals in 2017 and 2018. The Broncos play their home matches at Versluis Dickinson park in Kalamazoo, and are led by head coach Mark Allen.

=== Championships ===
United States Collegiate Ski and Snowboard Association (USCSSA) Championships

- Snowboard Team (Combined Men's and Women's)

2005

American Collegiate Hockey Association (ACHA) Division 2 Championships

- Ice Hockey (Men's)

1996

National Intercollegiate Flying Association (NIFA) National Championships

- SkyBroncos Precision Flight Team (5)

1947
1948
1983
1998
2002

United States Figure Skating Association (USFSA) National Championships

- Synchronized Skating – Collegiate division

2004
