= Western Michigan University SkyBroncos Precision Flight Team =

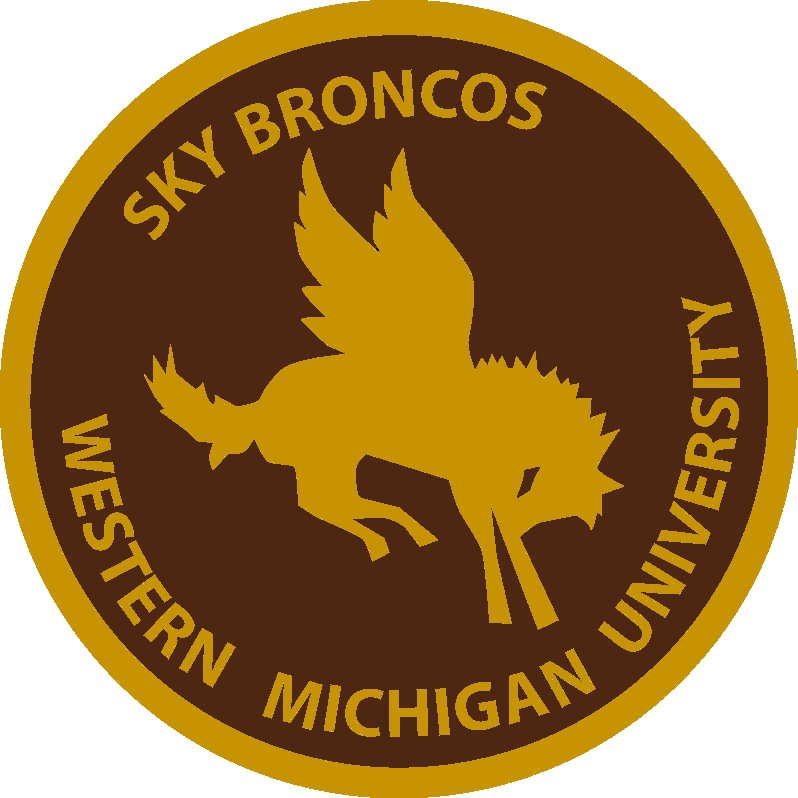
The Official logo of the Western Michigan University SkyBroncos Precision Flight Team

Western Michigan University's SkyBroncos Precision Flight Team is the official university-sanctioned flying team of Western Michigan University

Founded in 1946, the SkyBroncos compete in the NIFA (National Intercollegiate Flying Association) professional organization series of competitions as a forum of competing and learning for aviation students from colleges all around the United States. As of 2016, the SkyBroncos have won the NIFA National Championship award five times, and qualified for competition at the national level for twenty straight years. As of 2016, the SkyBroncos operate two Cessna 150 aircraft. These aircraft are used to compete in various NIFA flying events, including the Short-field Landing Event as well as the Power Off Landing Event. Some of the core competitive ground events are: Aircraft Recognition and Identification, E6B Manual Flight Computer Accuracy and S.C.A.N (Simulated Comprehensive Aircraft Navigation).

== History ==
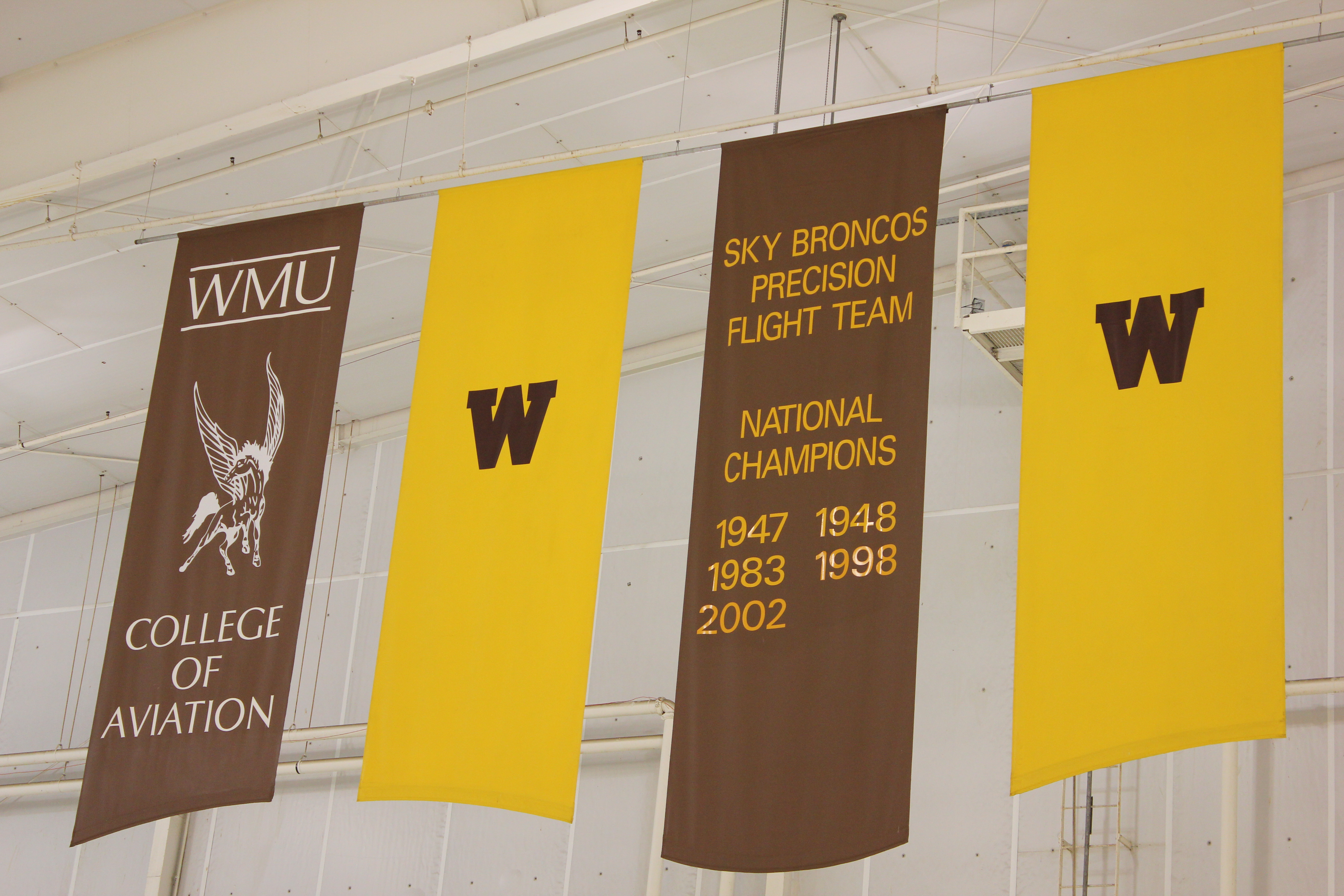
The National Championship banner for the SkyBroncos located in the main hangar at the College of Aviation in Battle Creek, Michigan

The SkyBroncos have roots dating back to 1946, starting as a flying club for aviators returning from World War II. In one of their first years competing, the team won the NIFA National Championship in 1947. The team went on to win the 1948 Championship as well, and have since won three more National trophies; 1983, 1998, and 2002.

== Purpose ==
The SkyBroncos compete within the realm of NIFA, and were founded to further knowledge in the aviation field.

Close to thirty schools attend the national competition each year. Prominent aviation schools include Embry-Riddle Aeronautical University, the University of North Dakota, Southern Illinois University of Carbondale, Ohio State University and Western Michigan University. The national competition is held at an airport close to a university with an active flight department. In one week of competition, the airport will host a few thousand aircraft operations, far more than for most any other week of the year.

== Aircraft ==
The SkyBroncos' two aircraft, N3258V and N6226K, a 1975 and 1976 model year Cessna 150 are both owned and maintained by Western Michigan University, however are operated solely by the SkyBroncos. Each aircraft is powered by a Continental Motors O-200 reciprocating engine. Lines of white paint are frequently applied to the tires of each aircraft to help identify where on the runway the aircraft touches down.

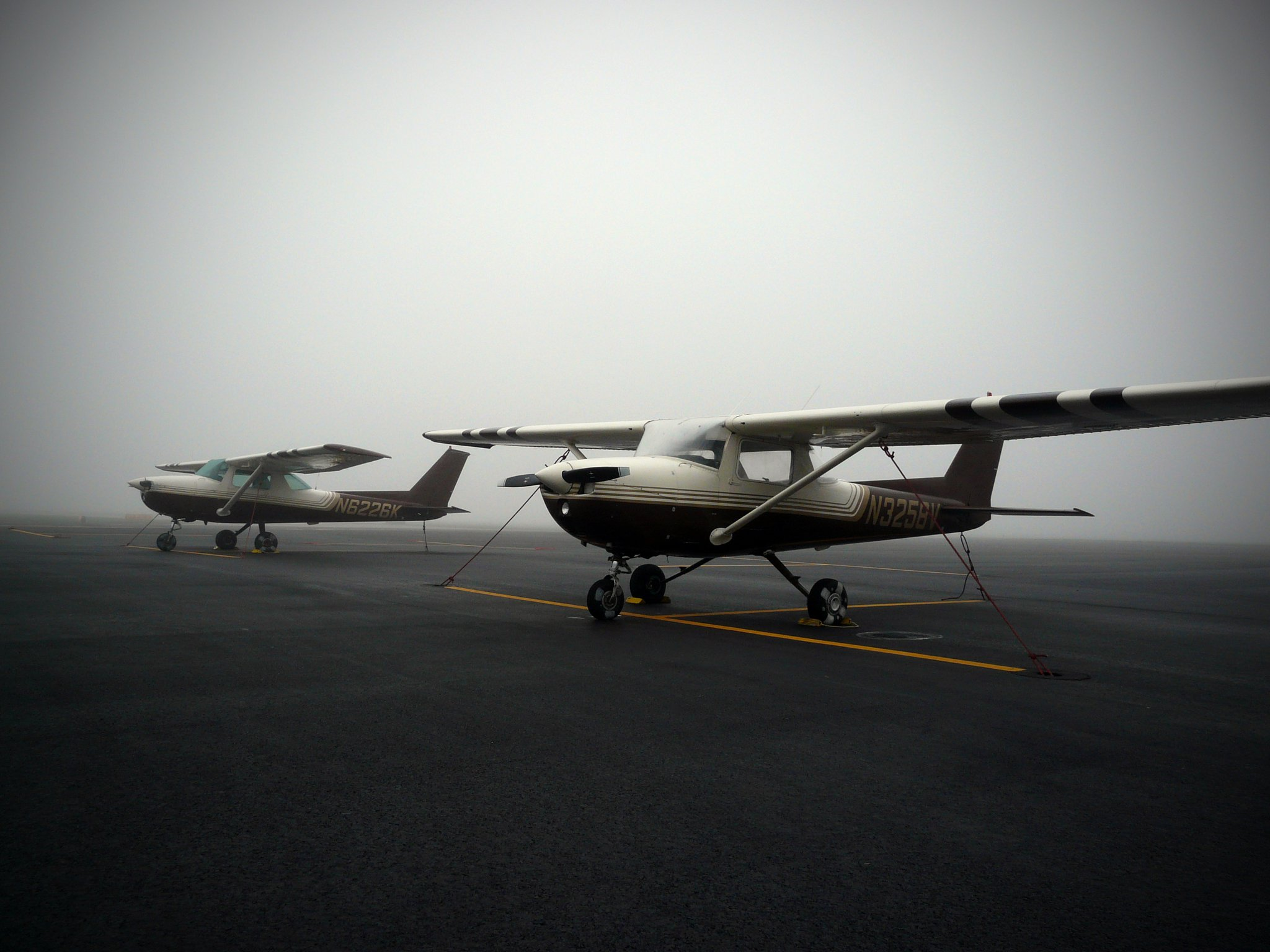
The two aircraft operated by the SkyBroncos, N3258V and N6226K

== Events ==
The SkyBroncos compete in multiple aviation related ground and flying events during each competition. The three main ground events in which the SkyBroncos compete in are: Aircraft Recognition and Identification, Computer Accuracy, and Simulated Comprehensive Aircraft Navigation.

== See also ==
- National Intercollegiate Flying Association
- Western Michigan Broncos
