= Ebert Field =

Softball field located in Kalamazoo, Michigan, US

- Interactive map of Ebert Field
- Location: On Oliver Street east of Business US 131 (Stadium Drive); Kalamazoo, Michigan
- Coordinates: 42°17′1.7″N 85°36′15.5″W
- Owner: Western Michigan University
- Operator: Western Michigan University
- Seating type: Bleacher seats
- Capacity: 400
- Surface: Grass
- Scoreboard: Electronic
- Field size: Left Field: 200 ft Center Field: 220 ft Right Field: 200 ft

Construction
- Renovated: 2000-01

Tenant
- Western Michigan Broncos softball (NCAA)

Ebert Field is a softball field located in Kalamazoo, Michigan, United States, and home to the Western Michigan University softball team. The field is named in honor of Fran Ebert, who started the WMU softball program in 1976. The stadium seats 400 fans in bleacher seating behind home plate and the first base side.

The field underwent extensive renovations in 2000 and 2001. The renovations improved the dugouts, wind screens, bullpen, and batting cage areas. A new scoreboard was also installed.
