= List of Mid-American Conference champions =

This article is a list of Mid-American Conference Champions. The Mid-American Conference sponsors 24 sports, 11 men's and 13 women's.

== Membership ==
Years listed are the calendar years in which membership began and ended. In the case of affiliate members, the first or last year of competition may differ from the start or end of membership.

=== Current members ===
- Ohio Bobcats (1947–present)
- Miami RedHawks (1948–present)
- Western Michigan Broncos (1948–present)
- Kent State Golden Flashes (1951–present)
- Toledo Rockets (1951–present)
- Bowling Green Falcons (1952–present)
- Central Michigan Chippewas (1972–present)
- Eastern Michigan Eagles (1972–present)
- Ball State Cardinals (1973–present)
- Northern Illinois Huskies (1973–1986, 1997–present; leaving in July 2026)
- Akron Zips (1992–present)
- Buffalo Bulls (1998–present)
- UMass Minutemen and Minutewomen (2025–present)

==== Affiliate members ====
- Appalachian State Mountaineers – Field hockey (2017–present)
- Bellarmine Knights – Field hockey (2021–present)
- Bloomsburg Huskies – Men's wrestling (2019–present)
- Clarion Golden Eagles – Men's wrestling (2019–present)
- Delaware Blue Hens – Women's rowing (2025–present)
- Detroit Mercy Titans – Women's lacrosse (2019–present)
- Edinboro Fighting Scots – Men's wrestling (2019–present)
- George Mason Patriots – Men's wrestling (2019–present)
- High Point Panthers – Women's rowing (2025–present)
- James Madison Dukes – Field hockey (2024–present)
- Lock Haven Bald Eagles – Men's wrestling (2019–present)
- Longwood Lancers – Field hockey (2014–present)
- Missouri State Lady Bears – Field hockey (2005–present)
- Rider Broncs – Men's wrestling (2019–present)
- Robert Morris Colonials – Women's lacrosse (2020–present)
- SIU Edwardsville Cougars – Men's wrestling (2018–present)
- Temple Owls – Women's rowing (2025–present)
- UIC Flames – Men's tennis (2023–present)
- Youngstown State Penguins – Women's lacrosse (2020–present)

==== Future affiliate members ====
- Sacramento State Hornets – Football (2026–future)

=== Former members ===
- Butler Bulldogs (1947–1950)
- Cincinnati Bearcats (1947–1953)
- Western Reserve Red Cats (1947–1955)
- Marshall Thundering Herd (1954–1969, 1997–2005)

==== Former affiliate members ====
- Binghamton Bearcats – Men's tennis (2014–2023)
- Chicago State Cougars – Men's tennis (2008–2013); men's soccer (2022–2023)
- Cleveland State Vikings – Men's wrestling (2019–2025)
- Evansville Purple Aces – Men's swimming and diving (2009–2024)
- Florida Atlantic Owls – Men's soccer (2008–2013)
- Hartwick Hawks – Men's soccer (2007–2014)
- IPFW Mastodons – Men's soccer (2005–2008), men's tennis (2002–2007)
- Kentucky Wildcats - Men's soccer (1995–2004)
- Louisville Cardinals – Field hockey (1994–2005)
- Missouri State Bears – Men's swimming & diving (2009–2024)
- Northern Iowa Panthers – Men's wrestling (2012–2017)
- Southern Illinois Salukis – Men's swimming and diving (2009–2024)
- Temple Owls – Football (2007–2012)
- UCF Golden Knights – Football (2002–2005)
- UMass Minutemen – Football (2012–2015); returned as full member in 2025
- Missouri Tigers – Men's wrestling (2012–2021)
- Old Dominion Monarchs – Wrestling (2013–2021)
- West Virginia Mountaineers – Men's soccer (2012–2021)
- SIU Edwardsville Cougars – Men's soccer (2017–2020)
- Valparaiso Beacons – Men's swimming (2022–2024) (Note: Valparaiso fields swimmers but no divers.)
- UIC Flames – Men's swimming and diving (2023–2024)

== Sports ==
=== Baseball ===
The baseball season begins in February and finishes with the conference tournament in May at Sprenger Stadium in Avon, Ohio.

| Year | | Regular season | Record | Tournament | Ref |
|---|---|---|---|---|---|
| 2026 | | Miami | 25–8 | Northern Illinois | |
| 2025 | | Miami, Kent State | 23–7 | Miami | |
| 2024 | | Bowling Green | 24–6 | Western Michigan | |
| 2023 | | Kent State | 24–6 | Ball State | |
| 2022 | | Ball State | 32–7 | Central Michigan | |
| 2021 | | Central Michigan | 20–4 | Central Michigan | |
| 2020 | | Season Cancelled | | | |
| 2019 | | Central Michigan | 22–5 | Central Michigan | |
| 2018 | | Kent State | 19–8 | Kent State | |
| 2017 | East | Kent State | 18–6 | Ohio | |
| 2017 | West | Central Michigan | 16–8 | Ohio | |
| 2016 | East | Kent State | 20–4 | Western Michigan | |
| 2016 | West | Ball State | 15–9 | Western Michigan | |
| 2015 | East | Kent State | 18–9 | Ohio | |
| 2015 | West | Central Michigan | 20–7 | Ohio | |
| 2014 | East | Miami | 18–9 | Kent State | |
| 2014 | West | Ball State | 22–4 | Kent State | |
| 2013 | East | Kent State | 20–7 | Bowling Green | |
| 2013 | West | Northern Illinois | 16–11 | Bowling Green | |
| 2012 | East | Kent State | 24–3 | Kent State | |
| 2012 | West | Toledo | 19–8 | Kent State | |
| 2011 | East | Kent State | 21–5 | Kent State | |
| 2011 | West | Central Michigan | 17–9 | Kent State | |
| 2010 | East | Bowling Green, Kent State | 18–9 | Kent State | |
| 2010 | West | Central Michigan | 20–7 | Kent State | |
| 2009 | East | Bowling Green | 18–8 | Kent State | |
| 2009 | West | Ball State | 14–10 | Kent State | |
| 2008 | East | Bowling Green, Kent State | 16–8 | Eastern Michigan | |
| 2008 | West | Eastern Michigan | 15–8 | Eastern Michigan | |
| 2007 | East | Kent State | 19–8 | Kent State | |
| 2007 | West | Eastern Michigan | 21–4 | Kent State | |
| 2006 | East | Kent State | 19–7 | Ball State | |
| 2006 | West | Central Michigan | 17–9 | Ball State | |
| 2005 | East | Miami | 17–5 | Miami | |
| 2005 | West | Ball State | 17–5 | Miami | |
| 2004 | East | Miami | 14–8 | Kent State | |
| 2004 | West | Central Michigan | 18–6 | Kent State | |
| 2003 | East | Kent State | 20–4 | Eastern Michigan | |
| 2003 | West | Ball State | 17–10 | Eastern Michigan | |
| 2002 | East | Bowling Green | 18–7 | Kent State | |
| 2002 | West | Eastern Michigan | 19–9 | Kent State | |
| 2001 | East | Bowling Green | 18–9 | Kent State | |
| 2001 | West | Ball State | 21–5 | Kent State | |
| 2000 | East | Kent State | 20–6 | Miami | |
| 2000 | West | Ball State, Central Michigan | 18–8 | Miami | |
| 1999 | East | Bowling Green | 21–10 | Bowling Green | |
| 1999 | West | Ball State | 25–6 | Bowling Green | |
| 1998 | East | Bowling Green | 17–10 | Bowling Green | |
| 1998 | West | Ball State | 23–8 | Bowling Green | |

| Year | | Regular season | Record | Tournament | Ref |
|---|---|---|---|---|---|
| 1997 | | Ohio | 22–9 | Ohio | |
| 1996 | | Kent State | 21–7 | Akron | |
| 1995 | | Bowling Green | 22–8 | Central Michigan | |
| 1994 | | Kent State | 18–7 | Central Michigan | |
| 1993 | | Central Michigan, Kent State | 22–10 | Kent State | |
| 1992 | | Kent State | 24–7 | Kent State | |
| 1991 | | Ohio | 20–11 | No tournament | |
| 1990 | | Central Michigan | 19–9 | No tournament | |
| 1989 | | Western Michigan | 23–6 | No tournament | |
| 1988 | | Central Michigan | 24–8 | No tournament | |
| 1987 | | Central Michigan | 23–7 | No tournament | |
| 1986 | | Central Michigan | 25–6 | No tournament | |
| 1985 | | Central Michigan | 23–9 | No tournament | |
| 1984 | | Central Michigan | 20–8 | No tournament | |
| 1983 | Eastern | Ohio | 10–4 | Miami | |
| 1983 | Western | Western Michigan | 8–4 | Miami | |
| 1982 | Eastern | Ohio | 10–5 | Eastern Michigan | |
| 1982 | Western | Western Michigan | 12–4 | Eastern Michigan | |
| 1981 | | Central Michigan | 13–3 | Eastern Michigan | |
| 1980 | | Central Michigan | 12–5 | | |
| 1979 | | Miami | 13–3 | | |
| 1978 | | Eastern Michigan | 12–3 | | |
| 1977 | | Central Michigan | 14–4 | | |
| 1976 | | Eastern Michigan | 12–3 | | |
| 1975 | | Eastern Michigan | 12–4 | | |
| 1974 | | Miami | 13–5 | | |
| 1973 | | Miami | 14–4 | | |
| 1972 | | Bowling Green | 6–2–1 | | |
| 1971 | | Ohio | 11–3 | | |
| 1970 | | Ohio | 14–1 | | |
| 1969 | | Ohio | 13–3 | | |
| 1968 | | Ohio | 9–0 | | |
| 1967 | | Western Michigan | 8–1 | | |
| 1966 | | Western Michigan | 8–1 | | |
| 1965 | | Ohio | 11–1 | | |
| 1964 | | Kent State, Ohio | 10–4 | Kent State * | |
| 1963 | | Western Michigan | 12–0 | | |
| 1962 | | Western Michigan | 9–0 | | |
| 1961 | | Western Michigan | 11–0 | | |
| 1960 | | Ohio | 8–1 | | |
| 1959 | | Ohio, Western Michigan | 8–2 | Western Michigan * | |
| 1958 | | Western Michigan | 10–0 | | |
| 1957 | | Western Michigan | 9–0 | | |
| 1956 | | Ohio | 7–2 | | |
| 1955 | | Western Michigan | 9–0 | | |
| 1954 | | Ohio | 8–1 | | |
| 1953 | | Ohio | 8–1 | | |
| 1952 | | Western Michigan | 8–0 | | |
| 1951 | | Western Michigan | 6–0 | | |
| 1950 | | Western Michigan | 9–1 | | |
| 1949 | | Western Michigan | 8–2 | | |
| 1948 | | Ohio | 7–2 | | |
| 1947 | | Ohio | 5–2 | | |

* One-game playoff winner. Prior to the conference tournament, regular season ties were broken with a one-game playoff.

=== Basketball (men's) ===
The men's basketball tournament is held in March at Rocket Arena in Cleveland. The tournament began in 1980 and has been held in Cleveland since 2000.

| Year | | Regular season | Record | Tournament | Ref |
|---|---|---|---|---|---|
| 2025–26 | | Miami | 18–0 | Akron | |
| 2024–25 | | Akron | 17–1 | Akron | |
| 2023–24 | | Toledo | 14–4 | Akron | |
| 2022–23 | | Toledo | 16–2 | Kent State | |
| 2021–22 | | Toledo | 17–3 | Akron | |
| 2020–21 | | Toledo | 15–4 | Ohio | |
| 2019–20 | East | Akron | 14–4 | Cancelled | |
| 2019–20 | West | Ball State, Northern Illinois | 11–7 | Cancelled | |
| 2018–19 | East | Buffalo | 16–2 | Buffalo | |
| 2018–19 | West | Toledo | 13–5 | Buffalo | |
| 2017–18 | East | Buffalo | 15–3 | Buffalo | |
| 2017–18 | West | Toledo | 13–5 | Buffalo | |
| 2016–17 | East | Akron | 14–4 | Kent State | |
| 2016–17 | West | Ball State, Western Michigan | 11–7 | Kent State | |
| 2015–16 | East | Akron | 13–5 | Buffalo | |
| 2015–16 | West | Ball State, Central Michigan | 10–8 | Buffalo | |
| 2014–15 | East | Buffalo, Kent State | 12–6 | Buffalo | |
| 2014–15 | West | Central Michigan | 12–6 | Buffalo | |
| 2013–14 | East | Buffalo | 13–5 | Western Michigan | |
| 2013–14 | West | Toledo, Western Michigan | 14–4 | Western Michigan | |
| 2012–13 | East | Akron, Ohio | 14–2 | Akron | |
| 2012–13 | West | Toledo, Western Michigan | 10–6 | Akron | |
| 2011–12 | East | Akron | 13–3 | Ohio | |
| 2011–12 | West | Eastern Michigan | 9–7 | Ohio | |
| 2010–11 | East | Kent State | 12–4 | Akron | |
| 2010–11 | West | Western Michigan | 11–5 | Akron | |
| 2009–10 | East | Kent State | 13–3 | Ohio | |
| 2009–10 | West | Central Michigan | 9–7 | Ohio | |
| 2008–09 | East | Bowling Green, Buffalo | 11–5 | Akron | |
| 2008–09 | West | Ball State, Central Michigan, Western Michigan | 7–9 | Akron | |
| 2007–08 | East | Kent State | 13–3 | Kent State | |
| 2007–08 | West | Western Michigan | 12–4 | Kent State | |
| 2006–07 | East | Akron | 13–3 | Miami | |
| 2006–07 | West | Toledo | 14–2 | Miami | |
| 2005–06 | East | Kent State | 15–3 | Kent State | |
| 2005–06 | West | Northern Illinois | 12–6 | Kent State | |
| 2004–05 | East | Miami | 12–6 | Ohio | |
| 2004–05 | West | Toledo, Western Michigan | 11–7 | Ohio | |
| 2003–04 | East | Kent State | 13–5 | Western Michigan | |
| 2003–04 | West | Western Michigan | 15–3 | Western Michigan | |
| 2002–03 | East | Kent State | 12–6 | Central Michigan | |
| 2002–03 | West | Central Michigan | 14–4 | Central Michigan | |
| 2001–02 | East | Kent State | 17–1 | Kent State | |
| 2001–02 | West | Ball State | 12–6 | Kent State | |
| 2000–01 | East | Kent State | 13–5 | Kent State | |
| 2000–01 | West | Central Michigan | 14–4 | Kent State | |
| 1999–00 | East | Bowling Green | 14–4 | Ball State | |
| 1999–00 | West | Ball State, Toledo | 11–7 | Ball State | |
| 1998–99 | East | Miami | 15–3 | Kent State | |
| 1998–99 | West | Toledo | 11–7 | Kent State | |
| 1997–98 | East | Akron | 13–5 | Eastern Michigan | |
| 1997–98 | West | Ball State, Western Michigan | 14–4 | Eastern Michigan | |

| Year | Regular season | Record | Tournament | Ref |
|---|---|---|---|---|
| 1996–97 | Bowling Green, Miami | 13–5 | Miami | |
| 1995–96 | Eastern Michigan | 14–4 | Eastern Michigan | |
| 1994–95 | Miami | 16–2 | Ball State | |
| 1993–94 | Ohio | 14–4 | Ohio | |
| 1992–93 | Ball State, Miami | 14–4 | Ball State | |
| 1991–92 | Miami | 13–3 | Miami | |
| 1990–91 | Eastern Michigan | 13–3 | Eastern Michigan | |
| 1989–90 | Ball State | 13–3 | Ball State | |
| 1988–89 | Ball State | 14–2 | Ball State | |
| 1987–88 | Eastern Michigan | 14–2 | Eastern Michigan | |
| 1986–87 | Central Michigan | 14–2 | Central Michigan | |
| 1985–86 | Miami | 16–2 | Ball State | |
| 1984–85 | Ohio | 14–4 | Ohio | |
| 1983–84 | Miami | 16–2 | Miami | |
| 1982–83 | Bowling Green | 15–3 | Ohio | |
| 1981–82 | Ball State | 12–4 | Northern Illinois | |
| 1980–81 | Ball State, Bowling Green, Northern Illinois, Toledo, Western Michigan | 10–6 | Ball State | |
| 1979–80 | Toledo | 14–2 | Toledo | |
| 1978–79 | Central Michigan, Toledo | 13–3 | Toledo * | |
| 1977–78 | Miami | 12–4 | | |
| 1976–77 | Central Michigan, Miami | 13–3 | Central Michigan * | |
| 1975–76 | Western Michigan | 15–1 | | |
| 1974–75 | Central Michigan | 10–4 | | |
| 1973–74 | Ohio | 9–3 | | |
| 1972–73 | Miami | 9–2 | | |
| 1971–72 | Ohio, Toledo | 7–3 | Ohio * | |
| 1970–71 | Miami | 9–1 | | |
| 1969–70 | Ohio | 9–1 | | |
| 1968–69 | Miami | 10–2 | | |
| 1967–68 | Bowling Green | 10–2 | | |
| 1966–67 | Toledo | 11–1 | | |
| 1965–66 | Miami | 11–1 | | |
| 1964–65 | Miami, Ohio | 11–1 | Ohio * | |
| 1963–64 | Ohio | 10–2 | | |
| 1962–63 | Bowling Green | 9–3 | | |
| 1961–62 | Bowling Green | 11–1 | | |
| 1960–61 | Ohio | 10–2 | | |
| 1959–60 | Ohio | 10–2 | | |
| 1958–59 | Bowling Green, Miami | 9–3 | Bowling Green * | |
| 1957–58 | Miami | 12–0 | | |
| 1956–57 | Miami | 11–1 | | |
| 1955–56 | Marshall | 10–2 | | |
| 1954–55 | Miami | 11–3 | | |
| 1953–54 | Toledo | 10–2 | | |
| 1952–53 | Miami | 10–2 | | |
| 1951–52 | Miami, Western Michigan | 9–3 | | |
| 1950–51 | Cincinnati | 7–1 | | |
| 1949–50 | Cincinnati | 10–0 | | |
| 1948–49 | Cincinnati | 9–1 | | |
| 1947–48 | Cincinnati | 7–2 | | |
| 1946–47 | Butler, Cincinnati | 6–2 | | |

* One-game playoff winner. Prior to the conference tournament, regular season ties were broken with a one-game playoff.

=== Basketball (women's) ===
The women's basketball tournament is held in March at Rocket Arena in Cleveland. The tournament was first held in 1982 and has been in Cleveland since 2000. It moved to Rocket Arena, then known as Quicken Loans Arena, in 2001.

| Year | | Regular season | Record | Tournament | Ref |
|---|---|---|---|---|---|
| 2025–26 | | Miami, Ball State | 16–2 | Miami | |
| 2024–25 | | Ball State | 16–2 | Ball State | |
| 2023–24 | | Toledo | 17–1 | Kent State | |
| 2022–23 | | Toledo | 16–2 | Toledo | |
| 2021–22 | | Toledo | 19–1 | Buffalo | |
| 2020–21 | | Bowling Green | 14–4 | Central Michigan | |
| 2019–20 | East | Kent State, Ohio | 11–7 | Cancelled | |
| 2019–20 | West | Central Michigan | 16–2 | Cancelled | |
| 2018–19 | East | Ohio | 14–4 | Buffalo | |
| 2018–19 | West | Central Michigan | 15–3 | Buffalo | |
| 2017–18 | East | Buffalo | 16–2 | Central Michigan | |
| 2017–18 | West | Central Michigan | 17–1 | Central Michigan | |
| 2016–17 | East | Kent State | 13–5 | Toledo | |
| 2016–17 | West | Central Michigan | 15–3 | Toledo | |
| 2015–16 | East | Ohio | 16–2 | Buffalo | |
| 2015–16 | West | Central Michigan | 14–4 | Buffalo | |
| 2014–15 | East | Ohio | 15–2 | Ohio | |
| 2014–15 | West | Ball State | 13–5 | Ohio | |
| 2013–14 | East | Bowling Green | 17–1 | Akron | |
| 2013–14 | West | Central Michigan | 16–2 | Akron | |
| 2012–13 | East | Akron | 12–4 | Central Michigan | |
| 2012–13 | West | Toledo | 15–1 | Central Michigan | |
| 2011–12 | East | Bowling Green | 14–2 | Eastern Michigan | |
| 2011–12 | West | Eastern Michigan, Toledo | 13–3 | Eastern Michigan | |
| 2010–11 | East | Bowling Green | 13–3 | Bowling Green | |
| 2010–11 | West | Toledo | 14–2 | Bowling Green | |
| 2009–10 | East | Bowling Green | 14–2 | Bowling Green | |
| 2009–10 | West | Toledo | 12–4 | Bowling Green | |
| 2008–09 | East | Bowling Green | 15–1 | Ball State | |
| 2008–09 | West | Ball State | 14–2 | Ball State | |
| 2007–08 | East | Bowling Green | 13–3 | Miami | |
| 2007–08 | West | Ball State, Eastern Michigan | 11–5 | Miami | |
| 2006–07 | East | Bowling Green | 15–1 | Bowling Green | |
| 2006–07 | West | Ball State | 13–3 | Bowling Green | |
| 2005–06 | East | Bowling Green | 16–0 | Bowling Green | |
| 2005–06 | West | Eastern Michigan | 15–1 | Bowling Green | |

| Year | | Regular season | Record | Tournament | Ref |
|---|---|---|---|---|---|
| 2004–05 | East | Kent State, Marshall | 12–4 | Bowling Green | |
| 2004–05 | West | Bowling Green | 13–3 | Bowling Green | |
| 2003–04 | East | Miami | 13–2 | Eastern Michigan | |
| 2003–04 | West | Eastern Michigan | 12–4 | Eastern Michigan | |
| 2002–03 | East | Miami | 11–5 | Western Michigan | |
| 2002–03 | West | Ball State, Toledo | 12–4 | Western Michigan | |
| 2001–02 | East | Kent State | 13–3 | Kent State | |
| 2001–02 | West | Ball State | 13–3 | Kent State | |
| 2000–01 | East | Kent State | 14–2 | Toledo | |
| 2000–01 | West | Toledo | 15–1 | Toledo | |
| 1999–00 | East | Kent State | 15–1 | Kent State | |
| 1999–00 | West | Western Michigan | 14–2 | Kent State | |
| 1998–99 | East | Kent State | 14–2 | Toledo | |
| 1998–99 | West | Toledo | 14–2 | Toledo | |
| 1997–98 | East | Kent State | 18–0 | Kent State | |
| 1997–98 | West | Toledo | 15–3 | Kent State | |
| 1996–97 | | Toledo | 16–2 | Toledo | |
| 1995–96 | | Kent State | 16–2 | Toledo | |
| 1994–95 | | Ohio, Toledo | 15–3 | Toledo | |
| 1993–94 | | Bowling Green | 17–1 | Bowling Green | |
| 1992–93 | | Bowling Green | 17–1 | Bowling Green | |
| 1991–92 | | Toledo | 15–1 | Toledo | |
| 1990–91 | | Toledo | 13–3 | Toledo | |
| 1989–90 | | Miami | 15–1 | Bowling Green | |
| 1988–89 | | Bowling Green | 16–0 | Bowling Green | |
| 1987–88 | | Bowling Green | 14–2 | Bowling Green | |
| 1986–87 | | Bowling Green | 16–0 | Bowling Green | |
| 1985–86 | | Ohio | 16–2 | Ohio | |
| 1984–85 | | Central Michigan | 15–3 | Western Michigan | |
| 1983–84 | | Central Michigan | 18–0 | Central Michigan | |
| 1982–83 | | Miami | 17–1 | Central Michigan | |
| 1981–82 | | Miami | 11–1 | Miami | |

=== Cross country (men's) ===
The men's cross country championship is held in late October or early November alongside the women's cross country championship.

| Year | MAC Championships | Ref |
|---|---|---|
| 2025 | Toledo | |
| 2024 | Toledo | |
| 2023 | Akron | |
| 2022 | Miami | |
| 2021 | Eastern Michigan | |
| 2020 | Eastern Michigan | |
| 2019 | Eastern Michigan | |
| 2018 | Miami | |
| 2017 | Eastern Michigan | |
| 2016 | Eastern Michigan | |
| 2015 | Eastern Michigan | |
| 2014 | Eastern Michigan | |
| 2013 | Eastern Michigan | |
| 2012 | Eastern Michigan | |
| 2011 | Eastern Michigan | |
| 2010 | Eastern Michigan | |
| 2009 | Kent State | |
| 2008 | Eastern Michigan | |
| 2007 | Eastern Michigan | |
| 2006 | Eastern Michigan | |

| Year | MAC Championships | Ref |
|---|---|---|
| 2005 | Eastern Michigan | |
| 2004 | Central Michigan | |
| 2003 | Central Michigan | |
| 2002 | Central Michigan | |
| 2001 | Eastern Michigan | |
| 2000 | Eastern Michigan | |
| 1999 | Central Michigan | |
| 1998 | Miami | |
| 1997 | Miami | |
| 1996 | Ohio | |
| 1995 | Bowling Green | |
| 1994 | Eastern Michigan | |
| 1993 | Eastern Michigan | |
| 1992 | Eastern Michigan | |
| 1991 | Eastern Michigan | |
| 1990 | Eastern Michigan | |
| 1989 | Central Michigan | |
| 1988 | Central Michigan | |
| 1987 | Ball State | |
| 1986 | Eastern Michigan | |

| Year | MAC Championships | Ref |
|---|---|---|
| 1985 | Miami | |
| 1984 | Miami | |
| 1983 | Miami | |
| 1982 | Central Michigan | |
| 1981 | Miami | |
| 1980 | Western Michigan | |
| 1979 | Western Michigan | |
| 1978 | Miami | |
| 1977 | Western Michigan | |
| 1976 | Western Michigan | |
| 1975 | Ball State | |
| 1974 | Eastern Michigan | |
| 1973 | Eastern Michigan | |
| 1972 | Miami | |
| 1971 | Miami | |
| 1970 | Western Michigan | |
| 1969 | Bowling Green | |
| 1968 | Western Michigan | |
| 1967 | Miami | |
| 1966 | Western Michigan | |

| Year | MAC Championships | Ref |
|---|---|---|
| 1965 | Miami | |
| 1964 | Ohio | |
| 1963 | Western Michigan | |
| 1962 | Ohio | |
| 1961 | Western Michigan | |
| 1960 | Western Michigan | |
| 1959 | Western Michigan | |
| 1958 | Western Michigan | |
| 1957 | Western Michigan | |
| 1956 | Miami | |
| 1955 | Miami | |
| 1954 | Miami | |
| 1953 | Miami | |
| 1952 | Miami | |
| 1951 | Miami | |
| 1950 | Miami | |
| 1949 | Miami | |
| 1948 | Western Michigan | |
| 1947 | Miami | |
| 1946 | Wayne State | |

=== Cross country (women's) ===
The women's cross country championship is held in late October or early November alongside the men's cross country championship.

| Year | MAC Championships | Ref |
|---|---|---|
| 2025 | Toledo | |
| 2024 | Toledo | |
| 2023 | Toledo | |
| 2022 | Toledo | |
| 2021 | Toledo | |
| 2020 | Northern Illinois | |
| 2019 | Eastern Michigan | |
| 2018 | Eastern Michigan | |
| 2017 | Eastern Michigan | |
| 2016 | Eastern Michigan | |
| 2015 | Eastern Michigan | |
| 2014 | Toledo | |
| 2013 | Miami | |

| Year | MAC Championships | Ref |
|---|---|---|
| 2012 | Toledo | |
| 2011 | Toledo | |
| 2010 | Toledo | |
| 2009 | Miami | |
| 2008 | Miami | |
| 2007 | Ohio | |
| 2006 | Ohio | |
| 2005 | Akron | |
| 2004 | Kent State | |
| 2003 | Ball State | |
| 2002 | Toledo | |

| Year | MAC Championships | Ref |
|---|---|---|
| 2001 | Toledo | |
| 2000 | Central Michigan | |
| 1999 | Akron | |
| 1998 | Bowling Green | |
| 1997 | Ohio | |
| 1996 | Bowling Green | |
| 1995 | Bowling Green | |
| 1994 | Ohio | |
| 1993 | Western Michigan | |
| 1992 | Ohio | |
| 1991 | Ohio | |

| Year | MAC Championships | Ref |
|---|---|---|
| 1990 | Ohio | |
| 1989 | Central Michigan, Ohio | |
| 1988 | Ohio | |
| 1987 | Ohio | |
| 1986 | Western Michigan | |
| 1985 | Western Michigan | |
| 1984 | Western Michigan | |
| 1983 | Bowling Green | |
| 1982 | Bowling Green | |
| 1981 | Bowling Green | |
| 1980 | Bowling Green | |

=== Field hockey ===
The field hockey tournament championship is hosted by the highest seed.

| Year | Regular season | Record | Tournament | Ref |
|---|---|---|---|---|
| 2025 | Miami, UMass | 8–1 | Miami | |
| 2024 | Appalachian State, James Madison, Miami | 7–1 | Miami | |
| 2023 | Miami, Appalachian State | 6–1 | Miami | |
| 2022 | Miami, Kent State | 6–1 | Miami | |
| 2021 | Miami, Kent State | 6–1 | Miami | |
| 2020-21 | Miami | 8–0 | Miami | |
| 2019 | Kent State, Miami | 5–1 | Miami | |
| 2018 | Miami | 6–0 | Miami | |
| 2017 | Miami | 6–0 | Miami | |
| 2016 | Miami, Kent State | 6–0 | Kent State | |
| 2015 | Miami, Kent State | 5–1 | Kent State | |
| 2014 | Central Michigan, Kent State | 5–1 | Kent State | |
| 2013 | Kent State | 4–1 | Miami | |
| 2012 | Miami | 6–0 | Miami | |
| 2011 | Ohio | 9–1 | Ohio | |
| 2010 | Miami, Kent State | 8–2 | Kent State | |
| 2009 | Kent State, Ohio | 8–2 | Ohio | |
| 2008 | Kent State | 9–1 | Kent State | |
| 2007 | Ohio | 9–1 | Ohio | |
| 2006 | Ohio | 8–2 | Ohio | |

| Year | Regular season | Record | Tournament | Ref |
|---|---|---|---|---|
| 2005 | Kent State | 8–2 | Central Michigan | |
| 2004 | Kent State, Louisville | 8–2 | Louisville | |
| 2003 | Kent State | 8–2 | Louisville | |
| 2002 | Central Michigan, Louisville | 7–3 | Kent State | |
| 2001 | Ohio | 9–1 | Ohio | |
| 2000 | Kent State | 10–0 | Kent State | |
| 1999 | Ball State, Kent State | 8–2 | Kent State | |
| 1998 | Ball State | 10–0 | Kent State | |
| 1997 | Ball State | 10–0 | Ball State | |
| 1996 | Ball State | 10–0 | Canceled | |
| 1995 | Ball State | 10–0 | Ball State | |
| 1994 | Ball State | 9–0 | Ball State | |
| 1993 | Ball State | 8–0 | Ball State | |
| 1992 | Kent State | 7–1 | Kent State | |
| 1991 | Ball State, Kent State | 7–1 | Kent State | |
| 1990 | Ball State | 4–1 | Central Michigan | |
| 1989 | Ball State | 5–0 | Ball State | |
| 1988 | Ball State, Kent State | 4–1 | Kent State | |
| 1987 | Ball State | 6–0 | Ohio | |
| 1986 | Ball State | 6–0 | Ball State | |
| 1985 | Ball State | 7–0 | Ball State | |
| 1984 | Ball State | 7–0 | Ball State | |
| 1983 | Regular season not held | | Ball State | |
| 1982 | Season not held | | | |
| 1981 | Miami, Ohio | 8–1 | No tournament | |

=== Football ===
The football championship game is held on the first weekend of December. Through the 2023 season, it pitted the East Division and West Division champions. The divisional alignment was scrapped after the 2023 season; since then, championship games have featured the top two teams in the conference standings (with tiebreakers employed as needed). From its inception in 1997 to 2003, it was held at the home field of the division champion with the best conference record (also with tiebreakers as needed). Since the 2004 edition, it has been held at Ford Field in Detroit.

| Year | | Regular season | Record | MAC Championship | Ref |
|---|---|---|---|---|---|
| 2025 | #1 | Western Michigan | 7–1 | Western Michigan | |
| 2025 | #2 | Miami | 6-2 | Western Michigan | |
| 2024 | #1 | Miami | 7–1 | Ohio | |
| 2024 | #2 | Ohio | 7–1 | Ohio | |
| 2023 | East | Miami | 7–1 | Miami | |
| 2023 | West | Toledo | 8–0 | Miami | |
| 2022 | East | Ohio | 7–1 | Toledo | |
| 2022 | West | Toledo | 5–3 | Toledo | |
| 2021 | East | Kent State | 6–2 | Northern Illinois | |
| 2021 | West | Northern Illinois | 6–2 | Northern Illinois | |
| 2020 | East | Buffalo | 5–0 | Ball State | |
| 2020 | West | Ball State | 5–1 | Ball State | |
| 2019 | East | Miami | 6–2 | Miami | |
| 2019 | West | Central Michigan | 6–2 | Miami | |
| 2018 | East | Buffalo | 7–1 | Northern Illinois | |
| 2018 | West | Northern Illinois | 6–2 | Northern Illinois | |
| 2017 | East | Akron | 6–2 | Toledo | |
| 2017 | West | Toledo | 7–1 | Toledo | |
| 2016 | East | Ohio | 6–2 | Western Michigan | |
| 2016 | West | Western Michigan | 8–0 | Western Michigan | |
| 2015 | East | Bowling Green | 7–1 | Bowling Green | |
| 2015 | West | Northern Illinois | 6–2 | Bowling Green | |
| 2014 | East | Bowling Green | 5–3 | Northern Illinois | |
| 2014 | West | Northern Illinois | 7–1 | Northern Illinois | |
| 2013 | East | Bowling Green | 7–1 | Bowling Green | |
| 2013 | West | Northern Illinois | 8–0 | Bowling Green | |
| 2012 | East | Kent State | 8–0 | Northern Illinois | |
| 2012 | West | Northern Illinois | 8–0 | Northern Illinois | |
| 2011 | East | Ohio | 6–2 | Northern Illinois | |
| 2011 | West | Northern Illinois, Toledo | 7–1 | Northern Illinois | |
| 2010 | East | Miami | 7–1 | Miami | |
| 2010 | West | Northern Illinois | 8–0 | Miami | |
| 2009 | East | Ohio, Temple | 7–1 | Central Michigan | |
| 2009 | West | Central Michigan | 8–0 | Central Michigan | |
| 2008 | East | Buffalo | 5–3 | Buffalo | |
| 2008 | West | Ball State | 8–0 | Buffalo | |
| 2007 | East | Bowling Green, Buffalo, Miami | 4–2 | Central Michigan | |
| 2007 | West | Ball State, Central Michigan | 4–1 | Central Michigan | |
| 2006 | East | Ohio | 7–1 | Central Michigan | |
| 2006 | West | Central Michigan | 7–1 | Central Michigan | |
| 2005 | East | Akron, Bowling Green, Miami | 5–3 | Akron | |
| 2005 | West | Northern Illinois, Toledo | 6–2 | Akron | |
| 2004 | East | Miami | 7–1 | Toledo | |
| 2004 | West | Northern Illinois, Toledo | 7–1 | Toledo | |
| 2003 | East | Miami | 8–0 | Miami | |
| 2003 | West | Bowling Green | 7–1 | Miami | |
| 2002 | East | Marshall | 7–1 | Marshall | |
| 2002 | West | Northern Illinois, Toledo | 7–1 | Marshall | |
| 2001 | East | Marshall | 6–0 | Toledo | |
| 2001 | West | Ball State, Northern Illinois, Toledo | 4–1 | Toledo | |
| 2000 | East | Akron, Marshall | 5–1 | Marshall | |
| 2000 | West | Toledo, Western Michigan | 4–1 | Marshall | |
| 1999 | East | Marshall | 8–0 | Marshall | |
| 1999 | West | Western Michigan | 6–2 | Marshall | |
| 1998 | East | Marshall, Miami | 7–1 | Marshall | |
| 1998 | West | Toledo | 6–2 | Marshall | |
| 1997 | East | Marshall | 7–1 | Marshall | |
| 1997 | West | Toledo | 7–1 | Marshall | |

| Year | Regular season | Record | MAC Championship | Ref |
|---|---|---|---|---|
| 1996 | Ball State | 7–1 | | |
| 1995 | Toledo | 7–0–1 | | |
| 1994 | Central Michigan | 8–1 | | |
| 1993 | Ball State | 7–0–1 | | |
| 1992 | Bowling Green | 8–0 | | |
| 1991 | Bowling Green | 8–0 | | |
| 1990 | Central Michigan, Toledo | 7–1 | | |
| 1989 | Ball State | 6–1–1 | | |
| 1988 | Western Michigan | 7–1 | | |
| 1987 | Eastern Michigan | 7–1 | | |
| 1986 | Miami | 6–2 | | |
| 1985 | Bowling Green | 9–0 | | |
| 1984 | Toledo | 7–1–1 | | |
| 1983 | Northern Illinois | 8–1 | | |
| 1982 | Bowling Green | 7–2 | | |
| 1981 | Toledo | 8–1 | | |
| 1980 | Central Michigan | 7–2 | | |
| 1979 | Central Michigan | 8–0–1 | | |
| 1978 | Ball State | 8–0 | | |
| 1977 | Miami | 5–0 | | |
| 1976 | Ball State | 4–1 | | |
| 1975 | Miami | 6–0 | | |
| 1974 | Miami | 5–0 | | |
| 1973 | Miami | 5–0 | | |
| 1972 | Kent State | 4–1 | | |
| 1971 | Toledo | 5–0 | | |
| 1970 | Toledo | 5–0 | | |
| 1969 | Toledo | 5–0 | | |
| 1968 | Ohio | 6–0 | | |
| 1967 | Ohio, Toledo | 5–1 | | |
| 1966 | Miami, Western Michigan | 5–1 | | |
| 1965 | Bowling Green, Miami | 5–1 | | |
| 1964 | Bowling Green | 5–1 | | |
| 1963 | Ohio | 5–1 | | |
| 1962 | Bowling Green | 5–0–1 | | |
| 1961 | Bowling Green | 5–1 | | |
| 1960 | Ohio | 6–0 | | |
| 1959 | Bowling Green | 6–0 | | |
| 1958 | Miami | 5–0 | | |
| 1957 | Miami | 5–0 | | |
| 1956 | Bowling Green | 5–0–1 | | |
| 1955 | Miami | 5–0 | | |
| 1954 | Miami | 4–0 | | |
| 1953 | Ohio | 5–0–1 | | |
| 1952 | Cincinnati | 3–0 | | |
| 1951 | Cincinnati | 3–0 | | |
| 1950 | Miami | 4–0 | | |
| 1949 | Cincinnati | 4–0 | | |
| 1948 | Miami | 4–0 | | |
| 1947 | Cincinnati | 3–1 | | |

=== Golf (men's) ===
The men's golf tournament is held annually in May. In 2018 it was held at Sycamore Hills Golf Club in Fort Wayne, Indiana.

| Year | Tournament | Ref |
|---|---|---|
| 2026 | Miami | |
| 2025 | Kent State | |
| 2024 | Ball State | |
| 2023 | Northern Illinois | |
| 2022 | Kent State | |
| 2021 | Kent State | |
| 2020 | Season Cancelled | |
| 2019 | Kent State, Eastern Michigan | |
| 2018 | Kent State | |
| 2017 | Kent State | |
| 2016 | Kent State | |
| 2015 | Miami | |
| 2014 | Kent State | |
| 2013 | Kent State | |
| 2012 | Kent State | |
| 2011 | Kent State | |
| 2010 | Kent State | |
| 2009 | Kent State | |
| 2008 | Eastern Michigan | |
| 2007 | Eastern Michigan | |
| 2006 | Kent State | |

| Year | Tournament | Ref |
|---|---|---|
| 2005 | Kent State | |
| 2004 | Toledo | |
| 2003 | Kent State | |
| 2002 | Toledo | |
| 2001 | Kent State | |
| 2000 | Kent State | |
| 1999 | Kent State | |
| 1998 | Kent State | |
| 1997 | Kent State | |
| 1996 | Miami | |
| 1995 | Kent State | |
| 1994 | Kent State | |
| 1993 | Kent State | |
| 1992 | Kent State, Miami | |
| 1991 | Miami | |
| 1990 | Miami | |
| 1989 | Miami | |
| 1988 | Miami | |
| 1987 | Miami | |
| 1986 | Ball State | |

| Year | Tournament | Ref |
|---|---|---|
| 1985 | Northern Illinois | |
| 1984 | Kent State | |
| 1983 | Bowling Green | |
| 1982 | Ball State | |
| 1981 | Miami | |
| 1980 | Ohio | |
| 1979 | Ohio | |
| 1978 | Bowling Green | |
| 1977 | Kent State | |
| 1976 | Northern Illinois | |
| 1975 | Ball State | |
| 1974 | Miami | |
| 1973 | Bowling Green | |
| 1972 | Bowling Green | |
| 1971 | Ohio | |
| 1970 | Miami | |
| 1969 | Ohio | |
| 1968 | Kent State | |
| 1967 | Ohio | |
| 1966 | Marshall | |

| Year | Tournament | Ref |
|---|---|---|
| 1965 | Ohio | |
| 1964 | Ohio, Toledo | |
| 1963 | Ohio | |
| 1962 | Marshall | |
| 1961 | Ohio | |
| 1960 | Ohio | |
| 1959 | Ohio | |
| 1958 | Ohio | |
| 1957 | Ohio | |
| 1956 | Bowling Green | |
| 1955 | Ohio | |
| 1954 | Kent State, Ohio | |
| 1953 | Ohio | |
| 1952 | Ohio | |
| 1951 | Ohio | |
| 1950 | Miami | |
| 1949 | Western Michigan | |
| 1948 | Miami | |
| 1947 | Wayne State | |

=== Golf (women's) ===
The women's golf tournament is held in April and rotates to different courses each year. In 2018 it was held at Naperville Country Club in Naperville, Illinois.

| Year | School | Ref |
|---|---|---|
| 2026 | Kent State | |
| 2025 | Kent State | |
| 2024 | Kent State | |
| 2023 | Kent State | |
| 2022 | Kent State | |
| 2021 | Kent State | |
| 2020 | Season Cancelled | |

| Year | School | Ref |
|---|---|---|
| 2019 | Kent State | |
| 2018 | Kent State | |
| 2017 | Kent State | |
| 2016 | Kent State | |
| 2015 | Kent State | |
| 2014 | Kent State | |
| 2013 | Kent State | |

| Year | School | Ref |
|---|---|---|
| 2012 | Kent State | |
| 2011 | Kent State | |
| 2010 | Kent State | |
| 2009 | Kent State | |
| 2008 | Kent State | |
| 2007 | Kent State | |
| 2006 | Kent State | |

| Year | School | Ref |
|---|---|---|
| 2005 | Kent State | |
| 2004 | Kent State | |
| 2003 | Kent State | |
| 2002 | Kent State | |
| 2001 | Kent State | |
| 2000 | Kent State | |
| 1999 | Kent State | |

=== Gymnastics ===
The gymnastics championship meet is rotated among the seven conference members who sponsor women's gymnastics.

| Year | Regular season | Record | MAC Championship | Ref |
|---|---|---|---|---|
| 2026 | Central Michigan | 6–0 | Central Michigan | |
| 2025 | Kent State | 6–0 | Central Michigan | |
| 2024 | Ball State, Kent State | 5–1 | Western Michigan | |
| 2023 | Ball State, Western Michigan | 5–1 | Central Michigan | |
| 2022 | Kent State, Central Michigan | 5–1 | Central Michigan | |
| 2021 | Ball State | 5–0 | Eastern Michigan | |
| 2020 | Western Michigan | 5–1 | Cancelled | |
| 2019 | Central Michigan | 6–0 | Northern Illinois | |
| 2018 | Central Michigan | 5–1 | Central Michigan | |
| 2017 | Eastern Michigan | 5–1 | Eastern Michigan | |
| 2016 | Kent State | 6–0 | Eastern Michigan | |
| 2015 | Central Michigan | 6–0 | Kent State | |
| 2014 | Kent State | 6–0 | Central Michigan | |
| 2013 | Kent State | 6–0 | Central Michigan, Western Michigan | |
| 2012 | Central Michigan | 6–0 | Central Michigan | |
| 2011 | Central Michigan | 6–0 | Central Michigan | |
| 2010 | Kent State | 6–0 | Central Michigan | |
| 2009 | Kent State | 6–0 | Kent State | |
| 2008 | Kent State | 6–0 | Kent State | |
| 2007 | Central Michigan, Kent State | 5–1 | Eastern Michigan | |
| 2006 | Kent State, Western Michigan | 5–1 | Western Michigan | |

| Year | Regular season | Record | MAC Championship | Ref |
|---|---|---|---|---|
| 2005 | Central Michigan | 6–0 | Kent State | |
| 2004 | Central Michigan | | Central Michigan | |
| 2003 | Central Michigan | | Central Michigan | |
| 2002 | Ball State | 3–3 | Ball State | |
| 2001 | | | Kent State | |
| 2000 | Central Michigan | | Central Michigan | |
| 1999 | Central Michigan | | Central Michigan | |
| 1998 | Central Michigan | | Central Michigan | |
| 1997 | | | Kent State | |
| 1996 | Kent State | 6–0 | Kent State | |
| 1995 | Central Michigan | | Central Michigan | |
| 1994 | | | Kent State | |
| 1993 | Central Michigan | | Central Michigan | |
| 1992 | Central Michigan | | Central Michigan | |
| 1991 | Central Michigan | | Central Michigan | |
| 1990 | Central Michigan | | Central Michigan | |
| 1989 | | | Kent State | |
| 1988 | | | Kent State | |
| 1987 | | | Western Michigan | |
| 1986 | | | Western Michigan | |
| 1985 | | | Bowling Green | |
| 1984 | | | Kent State | |
| 1983 | | | Bowling Green | |
| 1982 | | | Bowling Green | |
| 1981 | Kent State | 4–0 | Kent State | |

=== Lacrosse (women's) ===
The MAC began competing in Lacrosse for the 2021 season.

| Year | Regular season | Record | Tournament | Ref |
|---|---|---|---|---|
| 2026 | UMass | 7–0 | UMass | |
| 2025 | Akron, Eastern Michigan, Robert Morris | 4–2 | Akron | |
| 2024 | Central Michigan | 5–1 | Robert Morris | |
| 2023 | Kent State, Robert Morris | 7–1 | Central Michigan | |
| 2022 | Central Michigan, Youngstown State, Robert Morris | 8–2 | Central Michigan | |
| 2021 | Robert Morris | 10–0 | | |

=== Rowing (women's) ===
The MAC will hold its first rowing season in 2025–26, coinciding with the arrival of UMass as a full member. The Minutewomen are joined in MAC rowing by full members Eastern Michigan and Toledo, plus affiliates Delaware, High Point, and Temple.

| Year | Tournament | Ref |
|---|---|---|
| 2026 | Akron | |

=== Soccer (men's) ===
2022 season was the last sponsored season by the MAC.

| Year | Regular season | Record | Tournament | Ref |
|---|---|---|---|---|
| 2022 | Akron | 4–0–2 | Western Michigan | |
| 2021 | Northern Illinois | 4–0–2 | Northern Illinois | |
| 2020 | Season Cancelled | | | |
| 2019 | Akron | 4–0–1 | West Virginia | |
| 2018 | West Virginia | 5–0 | Akron | |
| 2017 | Western Michigan | 5–0 | Akron | |
| 2016 | Akron | 3–1–1 | Akron | |
| 2015 | Akron | 4–0–1 | Akron | |
| 2014 | Akron | 4–1 | Akron | |
| 2013 | Akron | 5–1 | Akron | |
| 2012 | Akron | 7–0 | Akron | |
| 2011 | Akron | 6–0 | Northern Illinois | |
| 2010 | Akron * | 6–0 | Akron | |

| Year | Regular season | Record | Tournament | Ref |
|---|---|---|---|---|
| 2009 | Akron | 6–0 | Akron | |
| 2008 | Akron | 6–0 | Akron | |
| 2007 | Akron | 4–0–1 | Akron | |
| 2006 | Akron, Northern Illinois | 4–1 | Northern Illinois | |
| 2005 | Akron | 5–0 | Akron | |
| 2004 | Kentucky | 4–1–1 | Akron | |
| 2003 | Kentucky | 6–0 | Western Michigan | |
| 2002 | Akron, Bowling Green | 4–1 | Akron | |
| 2001 | Kentucky | 6–0 | Kentucky | |
| 2000 | Akron, Bowling Green, Kentucky, Marshall | 4–2 | Kentucky | |
| 1999 | Akron | 6–0–1 | Kentucky | |
| 1998 | Akron | 7–0–1 | Akron | |
| 1997 | Akron | 5–1–1 | Bowling Green | |
| 1996 | Bowling Green | 5–0 | Bowling Green | |
| 1995 | Akron | 5–0 | Bowling Green | |
| 1994 | Miami | 4–0–1 | Miami | |
| 1993 | Akron | 5–0 | Not held | |

* Akron won the 2010 NCAA Men's Division I Soccer Tournament

=== Soccer (women's) ===
The women's soccer tournament begins in late October at campus sites. It concludes in early November at the highest remaining seed's home field.

| Year | | Regular season | Record | Tournament | Ref |
|---|---|---|---|---|---|
| 2025 | | Western Michigan | 10–1–1 | Western Michigan | |
| 2024 | | Western Michigan | 8–0–3 | Western Michigan | |
| 2023 | | Western Michigan | 8–0–3 | Ohio | |
| 2022 | | Buffalo | 7–0–4 | Buffalo | |
| 2021 | | Bowling Green | 8–2–1 | Bowling Green | |
| 2020-21 | East | Bowling Green | 5–1 | Bowling Green | |
| 2020-21 | West | Ball State | 6–2–1 | Bowling Green | |
| 2019 | | Bowling Green | 10–1 | Bowling Green | |
| 2018 | | Bowling Green | 10–1 | Bowling Green | |
| 2017 | East | Kent State | 9–2 | Toledo | |
| 2017 | West | Ball State | 8–1–2 | Toledo | |
| 2016 | East | Kent State | 8–1–2 | Kent State | |
| 2016 | West | Ball State | 9–1–1 | Kent State | |
| 2015 | East | Buffalo | 7–3–1 | Western Michigan | |
| 2015 | West | Ball State | 10–1 | Western Michigan | |
| 2014 | East | Buffalo | 9–0–2 | Buffalo | |
| 2014 | West | Eastern Michigan | 7–4 | Buffalo | |
| 2013 | East | Miami | 8–1–4 | Western Michigan | |
| 2013 | West | Western Michigan | 9–2–3 | Western Michigan | |
| 2013 | East | Miami | 8–1–4 | Western Michigan | |
| 2013 | West | Western Michigan | 9–2–3 | Western Michigan | |
| 2012 | East | Miami | 13–0–1 | Miami | |
| 2012 | West | Central Michigan | 11–3 | Miami | |
| 2011 | East | Kent State | 6–5–0 | Toledo | |
| 2011 | West | Toledo | 9–1–1 | Toledo | |
| 2010 | East | Miami | 5–4–2 | Central Michigan | |
| 2010 | West | Central Michigan, Toledo | 10–1–0 | Central Michigan | |

| Year | Regular season | Record | Tournament | Ref |
|---|---|---|---|---|
| 2009 | Central Michigan | 9–0–2 | Central Michigan | |
| 2008 | Toledo | 8–2–1 | Toledo | |
| 2007 | Ball State | 9–1–1 | Toledo | |
| 2006 | Ball State | 8–2–1 | Toledo | |
| 2005 | Bowling Green | 9–2 | Bowling Green | |
| 2004 | Kent State, Ohio | 7–2–3 | Bowling Green | |
| 2003 | Eastern Michigan, Kent State | 8–2–2 | Western Michigan | |
| 2002 | Miami | 11–1 | Miami | |
| 2001 | Ohio | 10–2 | Miami | |
| 2000 | Buffalo | 8–2–1 | Miami | |
| 1999 | Eastern Michigan | 8–1–2 | Eastern Michigan | |
| 1998 | Northern Illinois, Ohio | 9–1 | Northern Illinois | |
| 1997 | Northern Illinois | 6–1 | Northern Illinois | |

=== Softball ===
The softball tournament is held in May to determine the winner of the conference's automatic bid to the NCAA tournament. It has been held at various sites throughout the years. In 2008 the tournament returned to Firestone Stadium in Akron, Ohio where it was played from 2002 to 2005 after being played in 2006 and 2007 at Currie Stadium in Midland, Michigan. The first tournament was held in 1982 and the MAC added conference regular season play in 1983. From 1986 through 1995 the MAC did not have a conference tournament; the regular-season champion was awarded the league's bid to the NCAA tournament. In 1996 the tournament returned, but the championship game had to be suspended due to weather and once again the regular season champion won the automatic NCAA bid.

| Year | | Regular season | Record | Tournament | Ref |
|---|---|---|---|---|---|
| 2026 | | Akron | 21–6 | Akron | |
| 2025 | | Miami | 21–7 | Miami | |
| 2024 | | Miami | 26–1 | Miami | |
| 2023 | | Miami | 21–8 | Miami | |
| 2022 | | Miami | 24–5 | Miami | |
| 2021 | | Miami | 36–2 | Miami | |
| 2020 | | Season Cancelled | | | |
| 2019 | | Miami | 16–4 | Toledo | |
| 2018 | East | Ohio | 20–3 | Ohio | |
| 2018 | West | Ball State, Toledo | 16–7 | Ohio | |
| 2017 | East | Ohio | 17–7 | Kent State | |
| 2017 | West | Central Michigan | 18–5 | Kent State | |
| 2016 | East | Kent State | 16–7 | Ohio | |
| 2016 | West | Northern Illinois | 13–10 | Ohio | |
| 2015 | East | Kent State | 17–4 | Ball State | |
| 2015 | West | Ball State | 14–5 | Ball State | |
| 2014 | | Ball State | 12–4 | Ohio | |
| 2013 | | Ball State | 21–5 | Central Michigan | |
| 2012 | | Miami | 19–5 | Miami | |
| 2011 | East | Ohio | 12–8 | Western Michigan | |
| 2011 | West | Western Michigan | 14–6 | Western Michigan | |
| 2010 | East | Kent State | 18–5 | Ball State | |
| 2010 | West | Ball State | 17–5 | Ball State | |
| 2009 | East | Kent State | 15–6 | Miami | |
| 2009 | West | Ball State | 18–3 | Miami | |
| 2008 | East | Kent State | 20–2 | Kent State | |
| 2008 | West | Central Michigan | 14–7 | Kent State | |
| 2007 | East | Kent State | 15–3 | Eastern Michigan | |
| 2007 | West | Eastern Michigan | 12–5 | Eastern Michigan | |
| 2006 | East | Kent State | 16–5 | Kent State | |
| 2006 | West | Western Michigan | 18–4 | Kent State | |

| Year | | Regular season | Record | Tournament | Ref |
|---|---|---|---|---|---|
| 2005 | East | Marshall | 20–4 | Miami | |
| 2005 | West | Central Michigan | 16–6 | Miami | |
| 2004 | East | Kent State | 15–6 | Bowling Green | |
| 2004 | West | Central Michigan | 21–3 | Bowling Green | |
| 2003 | East | Marshall | 20–4 | Western Michigan | |
| 2003 | West | Western Michigan | 17–7 | Western Michigan | |
| 2002 | East | Akron | 18–6 | Central Michigan | |
| 2002 | West | Central Michigan | 23–1 | Central Michigan | |
| 2001 | East | Bowling Green | 19–5 | Central Michigan | |
| 2001 | West | Central Michigan | 20–4 | Central Michigan | |
| 2000 | East | Bowling Green, Marshall | 13–7 | Central Michigan | |
| 2000 | West | Northern Illinois | 19–3 | Central Michigan | |
| 1999 | East | Kent State | 18–6 | Central Michigan | |
| 1999 | West | Northern Illinois | 22–4 | Central Michigan | |
| 1998 | East | Akron | 23–5 | Ball State | |
| 1998 | West | Central Michigan | 22–5 | Ball State | |
| 1997 | | Central Michigan | 22–6 | Central Michigan | |
| 1996 | | Central Michigan | 26–6 | No tournament champion | |
| 1995 | | Ohio | 23–13 | No tournament | |
| 1994 | | Central Michigan | 23–11 | No tournament | |
| 1993 | | Bowling Green | 26–9 | No tournament | |
| 1992 | | Toledo | 27–4 | No tournament | |
| 1991 | | Central Michigan | 21–7 | No tournament | |
| 1990 | | Kent State | 20–4 | No tournament | |
| 1989 | | Toledo | 22–6 | No tournament | |
| 1988 | | Bowling Green | 24–8 | No tournament | |
| 1987 | | Central Michigan | 11–1 | No tournament | |
| 1986 | | Central Michigan | 16–2 | No tournament | |
| 1985 | | Toledo | 16–2 | Western Michigan | |
| 1984 | Eastern | Central Michigan | 8–2 | Central Michigan | |
| 1984 | Western | Western Michigan | 10–2 | Central Michigan | |
| 1983 | East | Miami | 7–3 | Central Michigan | |
| 1983 | West | Western Michigan | 9–3 | Central Michigan | |
| 1982 | | Tournament only | | Central Michigan | |

=== Swimming and diving (men's) ===
The MAC sponsored men's swimming & diving from 1952–53 through 2023–24. After that season, sponsorship of the sport transferred from the MAC to the Missouri Valley Conference (MVC). By that time, Ball State and Miami were the only full MAC members to sponsor men's swimming & diving; the remaining five teams that competed in the MAC were full MVC members.

| Year | MAC Championships | Ref |
|---|---|---|
| 2024 | Miami | |
| 2023 | Miami | |
| 2022 | Miami | |
| 2021 | Miami | |
| 2020 | Missouri State | |
| 2019 | Miami | |
| 2018 | Missouri State | |
| 2017 | Eastern Michigan | |
| 2016 | Eastern Michigan | |
| 2015 | Eastern Michigan | |
| 2014 | Missouri State | |
| 2013 | Eastern Michigan | |
| 2012 | Eastern Michigan | |
| 2011 | Buffalo | |
| 2010 | Eastern Michigan | |
| 2009 | Eastern Michigan | |
| 2008 | Eastern Michigan | |
| 2007 | Eastern Michigan | |
| 2006 | Miami | |
| 2005 | Eastern Michigan | |
| 2004 | Eastern Michigan | |
| 2003 | Eastern Michigan | |
| 2002 | Eastern Michigan | |
| 2001 | Eastern Michigan | |
| 2000 | Eastern Michigan | |
| 1999 | Miami | |
| 1998 | Eastern Michigan | |
| 1997 | Miami | |
| 1996 | Eastern Michigan | |
| 1995 | Eastern Michigan | |
| 1994 | Eastern Michigan | |
| 1993 | Eastern Michigan | |
| 1992 | Eastern Michigan | |
| 1991 | Eastern Michigan | |

| Year | MAC Championships | Ref |
|---|---|---|
| 1990 | Eastern Michigan | |
| 1989 | Eastern Michigan | |
| 1988 | Eastern Michigan | |
| 1987 | Eastern Michigan | |
| 1986 | Eastern Michigan | |
| 1985 | Eastern Michigan | |
| 1984 | Eastern Michigan | |
| 1983 | Eastern Michigan | |
| 1982 | Eastern Michigan | |
| 1981 | Eastern Michigan | |
| 1980 | Eastern Michigan | |
| 1979 | Kent State | |
| 1978 | Eastern Michigan | |
| 1977 | Kent State | |
| 1976 | Kent State | |
| 1975 | Miami | |
| 1974 | Kent State | |
| 1973 | Kent State | |
| 1972 | Kent State | |
| 1971 | Ohio | |
| 1970 | Ohio | |
| 1969 | Ohio | |
| 1968 | Miami | |
| 1967 | Miami | |
| 1966 | Ohio | |
| 1965 | Ohio | |
| 1964 | Western Michigan | |
| 1963 | Western Michigan | |
| 1962 | Bowling Green | |
| 1961 | Ohio | |
| 1960 | Bowling Green | |
| 1959 | Bowling Green | |
| 1958 | Bowling Green | |
| 1957 | Bowling Green | |
| 1956 | Bowling Green | |
| 1955 | Miami | |
| 1954 | Ohio | |
| 1953 | Ohio | |

=== Swimming and diving (women's) ===
| Year | MAC Championship | Ref |
|---|---|---|
| 2026 | Akron | |
| 2025 | Akron | |
| 2024 | Akron | |
| 2023 | Akron | |
| 2022 | Akron | |
| 2021 | Buffalo | |
| 2020 | Akron | |
| 2019 | Akron | |
| 2018 | Akron | |
| 2017 | Akron | |
| 2016 | Akron | |
| 2015 | Akron | |
| 2014 | Akron | |
| 2013 | Miami | |
| 2012 | Toledo | |
| 2011 | Ohio | |
| 2010 | Toledo | |
| 2009 | Miami | |
| 2008 | Ohio | |
| 2007 | Eastern Michigan | |
| 2006 | Eastern Michigan | |

| Year | MAC Championship | Ref |
|---|---|---|
| 2005 | Miami | |
| 2004 | Miami | |
| 2003 | Miami | |
| 2002 | Miami | |
| 2001 | Ohio | |
| 2000 | Ohio | |
| 1999 | Miami | |
| 1998 | Miami | |
| 1997 | Miami | |
| 1996 | Miami | |
| 1995 | Ohio | |
| 1994 | Ohio | |
| 1993 | Ohio | |
| 1992 | Ohio | |
| 1991 | Ohio | |
| 1990 | Ohio | |
| 1989 | Ohio | |
| 1988 | Miami | |
| 1987 | Miami | |
| 1986 | Miami | |
| 1985 | Miami | |
| 1984 | Miami | |
| 1983 | Miami | |
| 1982 | Miami | |
| 1981 | Bowling Green | |

=== Tennis (men's) ===
The men's tennis championships are held in April in Fort Wayne, Indiana.

| Year | Regular season | Record | Tournament | Ref |
|---|---|---|---|---|
| 2026 | Buffalo | 8–2 | Buffalo | |
| 2025 | Buffalo | 9–1 | Buffalo | |
| 2024 | Western Michigan | 8–2 | Toledo | |
| 2023 | Toledo | 8–2 | Toledo | |
| 2022 | Western Michigan | 9–1 | Western Michigan | |
| 2021 | Western Michigan | 9–0 | Not held | |
| 2020 | Season Cancelled | | | |
| 2019 | Western Michigan | 7–0 | Western Michigan | |
| 2018 | Western Michigan | 7–0 | Western Michigan | |
| 2017 | Buffalo | 7–0 | Buffalo | |
| 2016 | Western Michigan | 6–1 | Western Michigan | |
| 2015 | Northern Illinois | 4–1 | Buffalo | |
| 2014 | Northern Illinois | 4–0 | Ball State | |
| 2013 | Ball State | 5–0 | Western Michigan | |
| 2012 | Buffalo | 4–1 | Western Michigan | |
| 2011 | Western Michigan | 5–0 | Ball State | |
| 2010 | Buffalo | 5–0 | Western Michigan | |
| 2009 | Western Michigan | 5–0 | Western Michigan | |
| 2008 | Western Michigan | 5–0 | Western Michigan | |
| 2007 | Western Michigan | 5–0 | Western Michigan | |
| 2006 | Ball State | 5–0 | Western Michigan | |
| 2005 | Ball State | 5–0 | Ball State | |
| 2004 | Western Michigan | 5–0 | Western Michigan | |
| 2003 | Ball State | 5–0 | Ball State | |
| 2002 | Ball State, Bowling Green | | Ball State | |
| 2001 | Ball State | | Western Michigan | |
| 2000 | Ball State, Bowling Green, Western Michigan | 5–1 | Ball State | |
| 1999 | Western Michigan | | Western Michigan | |
| 1998 | Ball State | | Ball State | |
| 1997 | Ball State, Miami | | Miami | |
| 1996 | Miami | | Miami | |

| Year | Regular season | Record | Tournament | Ref |
|---|---|---|---|---|
| 1995 | Ball State, Miami | | Ball State | |
| 1994 | Ball State, Miami | | Miami | |
| 1993 | Ball State | | Ball State | |
| 1992 | Ball State | | Ball State | |
| 1991 | Ball State | | Ball State | |
| 1990 | Ball State | | Ball State | |
| 1989 | Ball State, Miami | | Ball State | |
| 1988 | Ball State | | Ball State | |
| 1987 | Ball State | | Ball State | |
| 1986 | Ball State | | Ball State | |
| 1985 | Ball State | | Ball State | |
| 1984 | Ball State | | Ball State | |
| 1983 | Miami | | Miami | |
| 1982 | Miami | | Miami | |
| 1981 | Western Michigan | | Western Michigan | |
| 1980 | Miami | | Miami | |
| 1979 | Miami | | Miami | |
| 1978 | Miami | | Miami | |
| 1977 | Miami | | Miami | |
| 1976 | Miami | | Miami | |
| 1975 | Miami | | Miami | |
| 1974 | Miami | | Miami | |
| 1973 | Toledo | | Toledo | |
| 1972 | Miami | | Miami | |
| 1971 | Toledo | | Toledo | |
| 1970 | Toledo | | Toledo | |
| 1969 | Toledo | | Toledo | |
| 1968 | Toledo | | Western Michigan | |
| 1967 | Toledo | | Toledo | |
| 1966 | Toledo | | Toledo | |
| 1965 | Western Michigan | | Western Michigan | |
| 1964 | Bowling Green, Miami, Western Michigan | | Bowling Green | |
| 1963 | Western Michigan | | Western Michigan | |
| 1962 | Western Michigan | | Western Michigan | |
| 1961 | Western Michigan | | Western Michigan | |
| 1960 | Western Michigan | | Western Michigan | |
| 1959 | Western Michigan | | Western Michigan | |
| 1958 | Western Michigan | | Western Michigan | |
| 1957 | Western Michigan | | Western Michigan | |
| 1956 | Miami, Western Michigan | | Miami | |
| 1955 | Western Michigan | | Western Michigan | |
| 1954 | Western Michigan | | Western Michigan | |
| 1953 | Miami | | Miami | |
| 1952 | Western Michigan | | Western Michigan | |
| 1951 | Cincinnati | | Cincinnati | |
| 1950 | Western Michigan | | Western Michigan | |
| 1949 | Cincinnati | | Cincinnati | |
| 1948 | Cincinnati | | Cincinnati | |
| 1947 | Cincinnati | | Cincinnati | |

=== Tennis (women's) ===
From 1981 to 1996 the conference champion was awarded based on points won at the MAC Individual Championships. The conference tournament changed to the current team format in 1997.

| Year | | Regular season | Record | MAC Championship | Ref |
|---|---|---|---|---|---|
| 2026 | | UMass | 7–1 | Toledo | |
| 2025 | East | Miami | 9–1 | Buffalo | |
| 2025 | West | Northern Illinois | 7–3 | Buffalo | |
| 2024 | East | Toledo | 9–1 | Toledo | |
| 2024 | West | Western Michigan | 7–3 | Toledo | |
| 2023 | East | Toledo | 10–0 | Ball State | |
| 2023 | West | Ball State | 7–1 | Ball State | |
| 2022 | East | Miami | 8–2 | Ball State | |
| 2022 | West | Ball State | 8–2 | Ball State | |

| Year | Regular season | Record | Tournament | Ref |
|---|---|---|---|---|
| 2021 | Ball State | 13–1 | Ball State | |
| 2020 | Season Cancelled | | | |
| 2019 | Miami | 6–1 | Miami | |
| 2018 | Buffalo | 8–0 | Buffalo | |
| 2017 | Ball State | 8–0 | Buffalo | |
| 2016 | Ball State | 7–1 | Ball State | |
| 2015 | Miami | 8–0 | Miami | |
| 2014 | Miami | 7–1 | Miami | |
| 2013 | Miami | 7–1 | Miami | |
| 2012 | Miami | 8–0 | Akron | |
| 2011 | Miami | 8–0 | Akron | |
| 2010 | Miami | 8–0 | Miami | |
| 2009 | Miami | 8–0 | Miami | |
| 2008 | Western Michigan | 8–0 | Buffalo | |
| 2007 | Western Michigan | 8–0 | Western Michigan | |
| 2006 | Western Michigan | | Western Michigan | |
| 2005 | Western Michigan | | Marshall | |
| 2004 | Marshall | | Marshall | |
| 2003 | Marshall | | Marshall | |
| 2002 | Marshall | | Marshall | |
| 2001 | Western Michigan | | Eastern Michigan | |
| 2000 | Marshall, Western Michigan | | Western Michigan | |
| 1999 | Western Michigan | | Western Michigan | |
| 1998 | Eastern Michigan | | Eastern Michigan | |
| 1997 | Western Michigan | | Western Michigan | |
| 1996 | Miami | | | |

| Year | Champion | Ref |
|---|---|---|
| 1995 | Western Michigan | |
| 1994 | Miami | |
| 1993 | Miami | |
| 1992 | Miami | |
| 1991 | Miami | |
| 1990 | Western Michigan | |
| 1989 | Miami | |
| 1988 | Miami | |
| 1987 | Miami | |
| 1986 | Miami | |
| 1985 | Miami | |
| 1984 | Miami, Western Michigan | |
| 1983 | Miami | |
| 1982 | Miami | |
| 1981 | Miami | |

=== Indoor track and field (men's) ===
The men's indoor track and field championships are held in February along with the women's championships.=

| Year | Champion | Ref |
|---|---|---|
| 2026 | Akron | |
| 2025 | Akron | |
| 2024 | Kent State | |
| 2023 | Eastern Michigan | |
| 2022 | Eastern Michigan | |
| 2021 | Eastern Michigan | |
| 2020 | Akron | |
| 2019 | Akron | |
| 2018 | Eastern Michigan | |
| 2017 | Akron | |

| Year | Champion | Ref |
|---|---|---|
| 2016 | Akron | |
| 2015 | Akron | |
| 2014 | Akron | |
| 2013 | Eastern Michigan | |
| 2012 | Akron | |
| 2011 | Akron | |
| 2010 | Eastern Michigan | |

| Year | Champion | Ref |
|---|---|---|
| 2009 | Kent State | |
| 2008 | Eastern Michigan | |
| 2007 | Eastern Michigan | |
| 2006 | Eastern Michigan | |
| 2005 | Central Michigan | |
| 2004 | Eastern Michigan | |
| 2003 | Eastern Michigan | |

| Year | Champion | Ref |
|---|---|---|
| 2002 | Eastern Michigan | |
| 2001 | Eastern Michigan | |
| 2000 | Eastern Michigan | |
| 1999 | Eastern Michigan | |
| 1998 | Eastern Michigan | |
| 1997 | Eastern Michigan | |
| 1996 | Eastern Michigan | |

=== Indoor track and field (women's) ===
The women's indoor track and field championships are held in February along with the men's championships. In 2010, they were held in Mount Pleasant, Michigan.

| Year | Tournament | Ref |
|---|---|---|
| 2026 | Kent State | |
| 2025 | Bowling Green | |
| 2024 | Eastern Michigan | |
| 2023 | Eastern Michigan | |
| 2022 | Akron | |
| 2021 | Northern Illinois | |
| 2020 | Eastern Michigan | |
| 2019 | Central Michigan | |
| 2018 | Eastern Michigan | |
| 2017 | Akron | |

| Year | Tournament | Ref |
|---|---|---|
| 2016 | Eastern Michigan | |
| 2015 | Eastern Michigan | |
| 2014 | Kent State | |
| 2013 | Kent State | |
| 2012 | Kent State | |
| 2011 | Eastern Michigan | |
| 2010 | Kent State | |

| Year | Tournament | Ref |
|---|---|---|
| 2009 | Akron | |
| 2008 | Akron | |
| 2007 | Akron | |
| 2006 | Akron | |
| 2005 | Akron | |
| 2004 | Central Michigan | |
| 2003 | Kent State | |

| Year | Tournament | Ref |
|---|---|---|
| 2002 | Central Michigan | |
| 2001 | Ball State | |
| 2000 | Eastern Michigan | |
| 1999 | Bowling Green | |
| 1998 | Ball State | |
| 1997 | Eastern Michigan | |
| 1996 | Ball State | |

=== Outdoor track and field (men's) ===
The Men's Outdoor Track and Field Championships are held each year in late May.

| Year | Champions | Ref |
|---|---|---|
| 2026 | Akron | |
| 2025 | Akron | |
| 2024 | Akron | |
| 2023 | Akron | |
| 2022 | Kent State | |
| 2021 | Miami | |
| 2020 | Season Cancelled | |
| 2019 | Akron | |
| 2018 | Eastern Michigan | |
| 2017 | Akron | |
| 2016 | Akron | |
| 2015 | Akron | |
| 2014 | Eastern Michigan | |
| 2013 | Akron | |
| 2012 | Akron | |
| 2011 | Akron | |
| 2010 | Eastern Michigan | |
| 2009 | Akron | |
| 2008 | Akron | |
| 2007 | Eastern Michigan | |
| 2006 | Central Michigan | |

| Year | Champions | Ref |
|---|---|---|
| 2005 | Central Michigan | |
| 2004 | Kent State | |
| 2003 | Central Michigan | |
| 2002 | Eastern Michigan | |
| 2001 | Eastern Michigan | |
| 2000 | Kent State | |
| 1999 | Eastern Michigan | |
| 1998 | Eastern Michigan | |
| 1997 | Eastern Michigan | |
| 1996 | Western Michigan | |
| 1995 | Western Michigan | |
| 1994 | Eastern Michigan | |
| 1993 | Miami | |
| 1992 | Eastern Michigan | |
| 1991 | Eastern Michigan | |
| 1990 | Eastern Michigan | |
| 1989 | Eastern Michigan | |
| 1988 | Eastern Michigan | |
| 1987 | Eastern Michigan | |
| 1986 | Eastern Michigan | |

| Year | Champions | Ref |
|---|---|---|
| 1985 | Western Michigan | |
| 1984 | Eastern Michigan | |
| 1983 | Eastern Michigan | |
| 1982 | Eastern Michigan | |
| 1981 | Miami | |
| 1980 | Western Michigan | |
| 1979 | Miami | |
| 1978 | Eastern Michigan | |
| 1977 | Eastern Michigan | |
| 1976 | Western Michigan | |
| 1975 | Kent State | |
| 1974 | Eastern Michigan | |
| 1973 | Kent State | |
| 1972 | Bowling Green | |
| 1971 | Western Michigan | |
| 1970 | Western Michigan | |
| 1969 | Western Michigan | |
| 1968 | Western Michigan | |
| 1967 | Miami | |
| 1966 | Western Michigan | |

| Year | Champions | Ref |
|---|---|---|
| 1965 | Miami | |
| 1964 | Western Michigan | |
| 1963 | Western Michigan | |
| 1962 | Western Michigan | |
| 1961 | Western Michigan | |
| 1960 | Western Michigan | |
| 1959 | Western Michigan | |
| 1958 | Western Michigan | |
| 1957 | Miami | |
| 1956 | Miami | |
| 1955 | Miami | |
| 1954 | Miami | |
| 1953 | Miami | |
| 1952 | Miami | |
| 1951 | Miami | |
| 1950 | Miami | |
| 1949 | Miami | |
| 1948 | Miami | |
| 1947 | Wayne State | |

=== Outdoor track and field (women's) ===
The Women's Outdoor Track and Field Championships are held each year in late May.

| Year | Champions | Ref |
|---|---|---|
| 2026 | Akron | |
| 2025 | Bowling Green | |
| 2024 | Kent State | |
| 2023 | Ball State | |
| 2022 | Akron | |
| 2021 | Kent State | |
| 2020 | Season Cancelled | |
| 2019 | Akron | |
| 2018 | Akron | |
| 2017 | Akron | |

| Year | Champions | Ref |
|---|---|---|
| 2016 | Eastern Michigan | |
| 2015 | Akron | |
| 2014 | Kent State | |
| 2013 | Kent State | |
| 2012 | Kent State | |
| 2011 | Kent State | |
| 2010 | Kent State | |
| 2009 | Akron | |
| 2008 | Akron | |
| 2007 | Akron | |
| 2006 | Akron | |
| 2005 | Kent State | |

| Year | Champions | Ref |
|---|---|---|
| 2004 | Central Michigan | |
| 2003 | Eastern Michigan | |
| 2002 | Kent State | |
| 2001 | Ball State | |
| 2000 | Ball State | |
| 1999 | Akron | |
| 1998 | Ball State | |
| 1997 | Eastern Michigan | |
| 1996 | Ball State | |
| 1995 | Eastern Michigan | |
| 1994 | Ohio | |
| 1993 | Eastern Michigan | |

| Year | Champions | Ref |
|---|---|---|
| 1992 | Eastern Michigan | |
| 1991 | Eastern Michigan | |
| 1990 | Eastern Michigan | |
| 1989 | Eastern Michigan | |
| 1988 | Eastern Michigan | |
| 1987 | Miami | |
| 1986 | Miami | |
| 1985 | Western Michigan | |
| 1984 | Ohio | |
| 1983 | Ohio | |
| 1982 | Eastern Michigan | |
| 1981 | Bowling Green | |

=== Volleyball ===
The volleyball tournament is played in November at campus sites.

| Year | | Regular season | Record | Tournament | Ref |
|---|---|---|---|---|---|
| 2025 | | Ball State | 17–1 | Toledo | |
| 2024 | | Bowling Green | 16–2 | Western Michigan | |
| 2023 | East | Bowling Green, Ohio | 13–5 | Western Michigan | |
| 2023 | West | Western Michigan | 18–0 | Western Michigan | |
| 2022 | East | Bowling Green | 15–3 | Bowling Green | |
| 2022 | West | Ball State | 15–3 | Bowling Green | |
| 2021 | East | Bowling Green | 16–2 | Ball State | |
| 2021 | West | Ball State | 17–1 | Ball State | |
| 2020 | East | Bowling Green | 20–1 | Bowling Green | |
| 2020 | West | Western Michigan | 17–4 | Bowling Green | |
| 2019 | East | Miami | 12–4 | Ball State | |
| 2019 | West | Ball State, Central Michigan | 11–5 | Ball State | |
| 2018 | East | Miami, Bowling Green | 13–3 | Eastern Michigan | |
| 2018 | West | Ball State | 12–4 | Eastern Michigan | |
| 2017 | East | Miami, Bowling Green | 13–3 | Miami | |
| 2017 | West | Ball State | 11–5 | Miami | |
| 2016 | East | Miami | 15–1 | Northern Illinois | |
| 2016 | West | Northern Illinois | 15–1 | Northern Illinois | |
| 2015 | | Northern Illinois | 14–2 | Ohio | |
| 2014 | | Ohio | 16–0 | Western Michigan | |
| 2013 | | Ohio | 17–2 | Ohio | |
| 2012 | | Bowling Green | 16–3 | Bowling Green | |
| 2011 | East | Ohio | 13–3 | Central Michigan | |
| 2011 | West | Northern Illinois | 14–2 | Central Michigan | |
| 2010 | East | Ohio | 10–6 | Ohio | |
| 2010 | West | Ball State | 14–2 | Ohio | |
| 2009 | East | Ohio | 15–1 | Ohio | |
| 2009 | West | Western Michigan | 13–3 | Ohio | |
| 2008 | East | Ohio | 13–3 | Ohio | |
| 2008 | West | Western Michigan | 14–2 | Ohio | |
| 2007 | East | Ohio | 15–1 | Miami | |
| 2007 | West | Western Michigan | 12–4 | Miami | |
| 2006 | East | Ohio | 16–0 | Ohio | |
| 2006 | West | Northern Illinois | 13–3 | Ohio | |

| Year | | Regular season | Record | Tournament | Ref |
|---|---|---|---|---|---|
| 2005 | East | Ohio | 16–0 | Ohio | |
| 2005 | West | Eastern Michigan | 14–2 | Ohio | |
| 2004 | East | Ohio | 16–0 | Ohio | |
| 2004 | West | Ball State | 12–4 | Ohio | |
| 2003 | East | Ohio | 15–1 | Ohio | |
| 2003 | West | Central Michigan | 11–5 | Ohio | |
| 2002 | East | Akron | 15–3 | Ball State | |
| 2002 | West | Ball State | 17–1 | Ball State | |
| 2001 | East | Bowling Green | 12–6 | Northern Illinois | |
| 2001 | West | northern Illinois | 15–3 | Northern Illinois | |
| 2000 | East | Bowling Green, Ohio | 12–6 | Western Michigan | |
| 2000 | West | Western Michigan | 17–1 | Western Michigan | |
| 1999 | East | Akron | 13–5 | Ball State | |
| 1999 | West | Ball State | 16–2 | Ball State | |
| 1998 | East | Miami | 15–3 | Miami or Northern Illinois | |
| 1998 | West | Ball State, Northern Illinois | 15–3 | Miami or Northern Illinois | |
| 1997 | East | Miami | 14–2 | Northern Illinois | |
| 1997 | West | Ball State, Northern Illinois | 14–2 | Northern Illinois | |
| 1996 | | Ball State, Miami | 15–2 | Miami | |
| 1995 | | Miami | 15–2 | Ball State | |
| 1994 | | Ball State | 17–0 | Ball State | |
| 1993 | | Ball State | 18–0 | Ball State | |
| 1992 | | Bowling Green | 17–1 | Ball State | |
| 1991 | | Bowling Green | 15–1 | Bowling Green | |
| 1990 | | Miami | 7–1 | Miami | |
| 1989 | | Bowling Green | 8–0 | Western Michigan | |
| 1988 | | Western Michigan | 8–0 | Western Michigan | |
| 1987 | | Western Michigan | 8–0 | Western Michigan | |
| 1986 | | Western Michigan | 16–0 | Not held | |
| 1985 | | Western Michigan | 18–0 | Not held | |
| 1984 | | Western Michigan | 18–0 | Not held | |
| 1983 | | Western Michigan | 18–0 | Not held | |
| 1982 | | Not held | | Western Michigan | |
| 1981 | | Not held | | Miami | |
| 1980 | | Not held | | Miami | |

=== Wrestling (men's) ===
The men's wrestling championship is rotated among the conference members.

No MAC member currently sponsors women's wrestling, which became an official NCAA championship sport in 2025–26. Kent State plans to add women's wrestling in 2027–28.

| Year | Regular season | Record | MAC Championship | Ref |
|---|---|---|---|---|
| 2026 | East: Rider; West: SIUE | 6–0; 5–1 | Rider | |
| 2025 | East: Lock Haven; West: Northern Illinois | 7–1; 6–0 | Lock Haven | |
| 2024 | East: Rider; West: Northern Illinois | 6–1; 5–1 | Central Michigan | |
| 2023 | East: Rider; West: Central Michigan | 6–1; 5–1 | Lock Haven | |
| 2022 | Central Michigan | 7–0 | Lock Haven | |
| 2021 | Missouri | 8–0 | Missouri | |
| 2020 | Missouri | 8–0 | Missouri | |
| 2019 | Missouri | 7–0 | Missouri | |
| 2018 | Missouri | 7–0 | Missouri | |
| 2017 | Northern Iowa | 8–0 | Missouri | |
| 2016 | Missouri | 8–0 | Missouri | |
| 2015 | Missouri | 8–0 | Missouri | |
| 2014 | Northern Iowa | 7–0 | Missouri | |
| 2013 | Central Michigan | 5–0 | Missouri | |
| 2012 | Central Michigan | 4–1 | Central Michigan | |
| 2011 | Central Michigan, Kent State, Ohio | 4–1 | Central Michigan | |
| 2010 | Central Michigan | 5–0 | Central Michigan | |
| 2009 | Kent State | 5–0 | Central Michigan | |
| 2008 | Central Michigan | 5–0 | Central Michigan | |
| 2007 | Central Michigan | 5–0 | Central Michigan | |
| 2006 | Central Michigan | | Central Michigan | |
| 2005 | Central Michigan | | Central Michigan | |
| 2004 | Central Michigan | | Central Michigan | |
| 2003 | Central Michigan, Kent State | | Central Michigan | |
| 2002 | Central Michigan | | Central Michigan | |
| 2001 | Central Michigan | | Ohio | |
| 2000 | Central Michigan | | Central Michigan | |
| 1999 | Central Michigan | | Central Michigan | |
| 1998 | | | Central Michigan | |
| 1997 | | | Ohio | |
| 1996 | | | Eastern Michigan | |
| 1995 | | | Ohio | |
| 1994 | | | Ohio | |
| 1993 | | | Ohio | |
| 1992 | | | Miami | |

| Year | Regular season | Record | MAC Championship | Ref |
|---|---|---|---|---|
| 1991 | | | Miami | |
| 1990 | | | Kent State | |
| 1989 | | | Kent State | |
| 1988 | | | Kent State | |
| 1987 | | | Central Michigan | |
| 1986 | | | Central Michigan | |
| 1985 | | | Northern Illinois | |
| 1984 | | | Miami | |
| 1983 | | | Toledo | |
| 1982 | | | Kent State | |
| 1981 | | | Kent State | |
| 1980 | | | Kent State | |
| 1979 | | | Kent State | |
| 1978 | | | Kent State | |
| 1977 | | | Kent State | |
| 1976 | | | Ohio | |
| 1975 | | | Ohio | |
| 1974 | | | Ohio | |
| 1973 | | | Ohio | |
| 1972 | | | Ohio | |
| 1971 | | | Ohio | |
| 1970 | | | Ohio | |
| 1969 | | | Toledo | |
| 1968 | | | Miami | |
| 1967 | | | Miami | |
| 1966 | | | Bowling Green | |
| 1965 | | | Miami | |
| 1964 | | | Miami | |
| 1963 | | | Toledo | |
| 1962 | | | Toledo | |
| 1961 | | | Miami | |
| 1960 | | | Bowling Green | |
| 1959 | | | Bowling Green | |
| 1958 | | | Kent State | |
| 1957 | | | Ohio | |
| 1956 | | | Ohio | |
| 1955 | | | Ohio | |
| 1954 | | | Toledo | |
| 1953 | | | Toledo | |
| 1952 | | | Toledo | |
