= Colorado Northwestern Community College =

Two-campus public college in Colorado, US

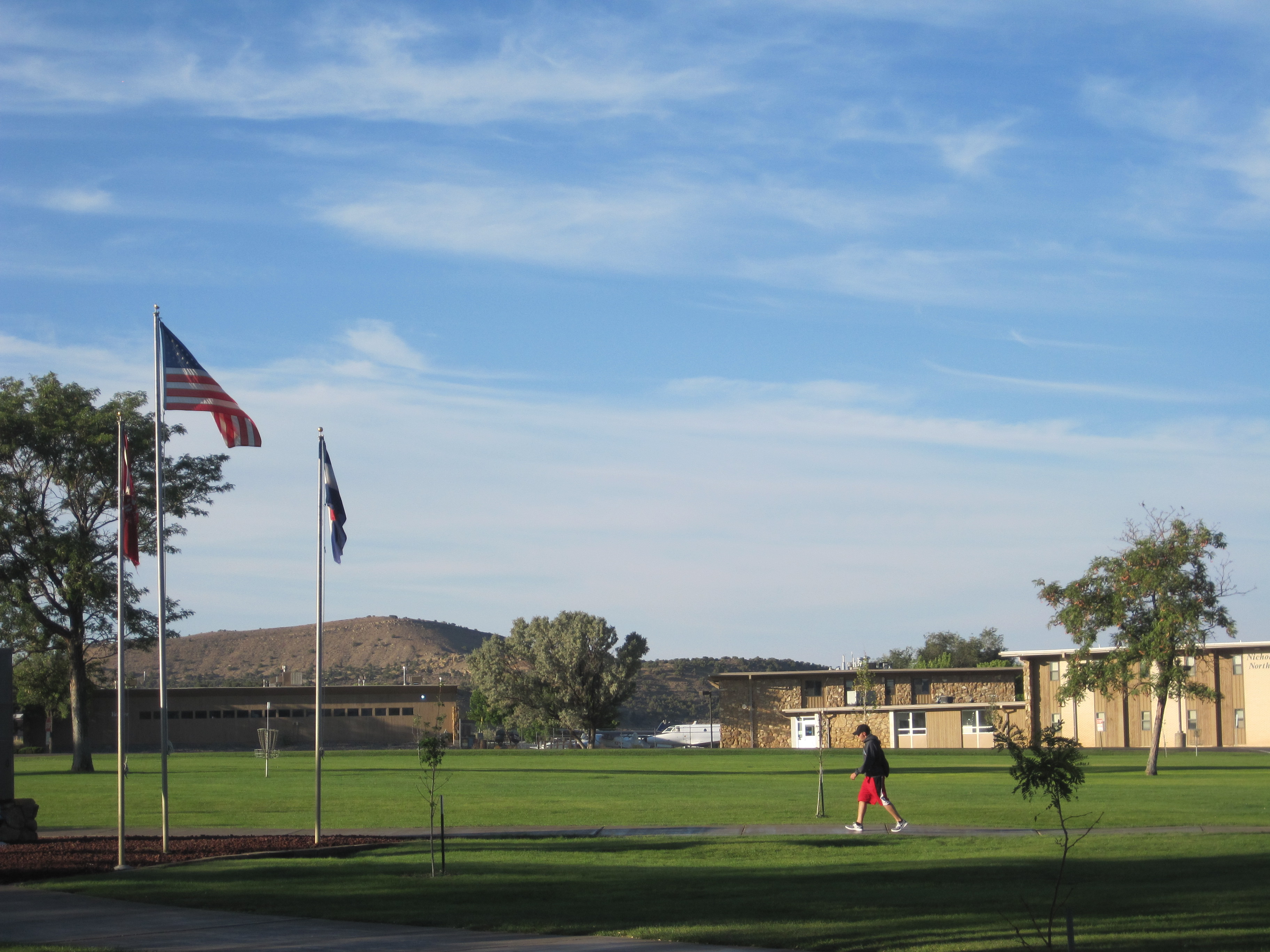
- CNCC Rangely
- Other name: CNCC
- Motto: Set Yourself Apart
- Type: Public community college
- Established: 1962; 64 years ago
- Affiliations: NJCAA, IHSA, NIRA, Phi Theta Kappa, NIFA.
- President: Lisa Jones
- Academic staff: 46 full-time faculty, numerous adjunct faculty
- Students: 1,271 (fall 2024)
- Location: Rangely and Craig, Colorado, plus online
- Newspaper: Spartan Times
- Colors: Red, White, Black
- Mascot: Spartan
- Website: www.cncc.edu

Colorado Northwestern Community College (CNCC) is a public community college with campuses in Rangely and Craig, Colorado, as well as academic centers in Meeker and Oak Creek, Colorado. The college participates in the National Intercollegiate Flying Association (NIFA) and the National Junior College Athletic Association (NJCAA).

== Rangely Campus ==
The Rangely Campus of CNCC, serving around 300 students, sits on a lush mesa overlooking the town of Rangely. Established in 1962 as “Rangely College,” it has earned a sterling reputation for its Dental Hygiene, Aviation, and Park Ranger Training Programs. Today, students describe the campus as a “mini university” complete with residence halls, a vibrant student life, and five NJCAA Division I athletic teams.

Outdoor activities and programs are available to students, including river rafting, ice climbing, camping, and even spelunking.

The local taxing district provides a 100% tuition buy-down to its residents and the college offers community education classes and seminars.

== Craig Campus ==
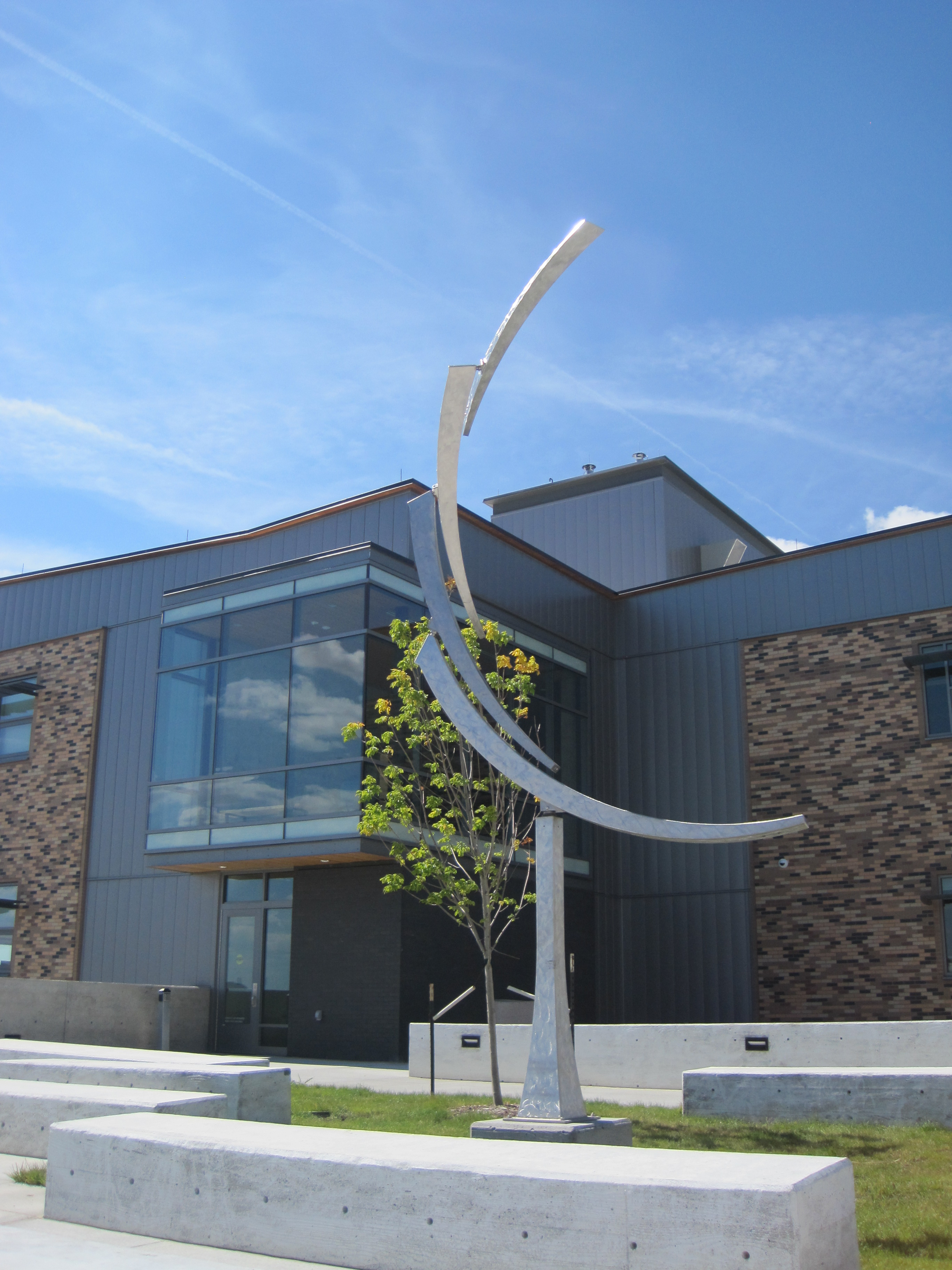
Craig Campus at CNCC

In 1985, Colorado Northwestern Community College extended its services to Craig, Colorado. A community of approximately 9,000, Craig is located 93 miles northeast of Rangely, 42 miles west of Steamboat Springs and 90 miles north of Rifle.

Originally, CNCC Craig offered classes throughout the community in facilities that were available at the time. In 1989 the Moffat County Affiliated Junior College district Board of Control purchased the Bell Tower Building.

In 2010, CNCC built a new campus in Craig. Located on 100 acres just north of the recently completed Memorial Hospital, CNCC-Craig Campus opened August 8, 2011. This 78,000 square foot building is LEED certified and is home to classrooms, laboratories, a virtual library, a Nursing program, Adult Learning Assistance Center and a student lounge. Adjacent to the building is a career technical center where students can receive training in Cosmetology, Massage Therapy, Mine Safety, and Automotive/Diesel Technology.
