= Kathy Beauregard =

Athletic director

Biographical details
- Born: May 17, 1957 (age 69); Kalamazoo, Michigan, U.S.
- Education: Hope College, Western Michigan University

Coaching career (HC unless noted)
- 1980–1988: Western Michigan

Administrative career (AD unless noted)
- 1989–1997: Western Michigan (associate AD)
- 1997–2021: Western Michigan

Head coaching record
- Overall: 76–51–2

Kathy Beauregard (born May 17, 1957) is the former director of athletics for Western Michigan University. She previously served as an associate athletic director at Western Michigan from 1989 to 1997, and as women's gymnastics head coach at Western Michigan from 1980 to 1988. Beauregard graduated from Hope College with a bachelor's degree in 1979, and from Western Michigan University with a master's degree in 1981. Beauregard's hiring of football coach P. J. Fleck in 2013 propelled the Broncos football team to its greatest successes in program history, culminating in a 13–1 record in 2016 and berth in the 2017 Cotton Bowl. Beauregard retired as athletic director at Western Michigan on December 31, 2021.

== Head coaching record ==
Record table
Season	Team	Overall	Conference	Standing	Postseason
Western Michigan Broncos (Mid-American Conference) (1980–1988)
1980	Western Michigan	7–6			
1981	Western Michigan	8–4			
1982	Western Michigan	5–8			
1983	Western Michigan	10–8			
1984	Western Michigan	5–4–2			
1985	Western Michigan	13–5			
1986	Western Michigan	6–7			
1987	Western Michigan	8–6			
1988	Western Michigan	14–3			
Western Michigan:		76–51–2			
Total:		76–51–2			
