= National Intercollegiate Flying Association =

The National Intercollegiate Flying Association (NIFA) is a professional organization that provides a forum of competition and learning for aviation students from colleges all around the United States.

== National championships ==
Year	Host		Champion	Score	Runner-up	Score	Third place	Score	Fourth place	Score
1975			USAF Academy	-		-		-		-
1976			Northeastern University	-		-		-		-
1977	Oklahoma State University		Southern Illinois University	-	Saint Louis University	-	San Jose State University	-	United States Air Force Academy	-
1978	Middle Tennessee State University		Southern Illinois University	30	University of North Dakota	25	Auburn University	23		-
1979	Northeast Louisiana University		Southern Illinois University	-	San Jose State University	-	Western Michigan University	-	Cochise College	-
1980	University of North Dakota			-		-		-		-
1981	Northeast Louisiana University		Southern Illinois University	-		-		-		-
1982	Palomar Community College		Southern Illinois University	-		-		-		-
1983	Western Michigan University		Western Michigan University	-		-		-		-
1984	United States Air Force Academy		Southern Illinois University	-		-		-		-
1985	Ohio State University		University of North Dakota	-		-		-		-
1986	Texas State Technical College		University of North Dakota	90	San Jose State University	49	Southern Illinois University	43	United States Air Force Academy	40
1987	Southern Illinois University		University of North Dakota	107	Oklahoma State University	58	Ohio State University	56	Nicholls State University	56
1988	Northeast Louisiana University		University of North Dakota	103	University of Illinois at Urbana–Champaign	93	Ohio State University	72	Western Michigan University	56
1989	University of North Dakota		University of North Dakota	88	Ohio State University	73	Embry–Riddle Aeronautical University, Prescott	54	University of Illinois at Urbana–Champaign	54
1990	University of Illinois at Urbana–Champaign		University of North Dakota	129	Ohio State University	103	University of Illinois at Urbana–Champaign	100	United States Air Force Academy	90
1991	Nicholls State University		University of North Dakota	112	Ohio State University	101	University of Illinois at Urbana–Champaign	64	United States Air Force Academy	56
1992	Northeast Louisiana University		Embry–Riddle Aeronautical University, Daytona Beach	77	Western Michigan University	75	United States Air Force Academy	66	University of Illinois at Urbana–Champaign	65
1993	Central Texas University		Embry–Riddle Aeronautical University, Prescott	167	United States Air Force Academy	69	Western Michigan University	65	University of North Dakota	62
1994	Saint Louis University		University of North Dakota	-	Western Michigan University	-	University of Illinois at Urbana–Champaign	-	Embry–Riddle Aeronautical University, Prescott	-
1995	Delta State University		University of North Dakota	115	Ohio State University	94	Western Michigan University	85	Embry–Riddle Aeronautical University, Daytona Beach	60
1996	Embry–Riddle Aeronautical University, Daytona Beach		University of North Dakota	121	Western Michigan University	112	Embry–Riddle Aeronautical University, Daytona Beach	101	United States Air Force Academy	78
1997	Western Michigan University		Embry–Riddle Aeronautical University, Prescott	94	University of North Dakota	91	Western Michigan University	82	Embry–Riddle Aeronautical University, Daytona Beach	45
1998	Kansas State		Western Michigan University	139	Embry–Riddle Aeronautical University, Prescott	83	University of North Dakota	78	Southern Illinois University	57
1999	Kansas State		Embry–Riddle Aeronautical University, Prescott	160	University of North Dakota	95	Western Michigan University	68	Southern Illinois University	67
2000	Delta State University		University of North Dakota	162	Western Michigan University	130	Embry–Riddle Aeronautical University, Prescott	101	Ohio State University	56
2001	University of North Dakota		University of North Dakota	124	Western Michigan University	112	Embry–Riddle Aeronautical University, Prescott	93	Southern Illinois University	71
2002	Ohio State University		Western Michigan University	134	Embry–Riddle Aeronautical University, Prescott	98	University of North Dakota	91	United States Air Force Academy	65
2003	University of North Dakota		Embry–Riddle Aeronautical University, Prescott	178	University of North Dakota	170	Western Michigan University	101	Southern Illinois University	44
2004	Middle Tennessee State University		University of North Dakota	124	Western Michigan University	99	Embry–Riddle Aeronautical University, Prescott	96	Southern Illinois University	70
2005	Kansas State University		Embry–Riddle Aeronautical University, Prescott	466	University of North Dakota	348	Western Michigan University	262	Southern Illinois University	225
2006	Ohio State University		University of North Dakota	366	Embry–Riddle Aeronautical University, Prescott	336	Western Michigan University	277	United States Air Force Academy	212
2007	Ohio State University		Embry–Riddle Aeronautical University, Prescott	440	University of North Dakota	351	Embry–Riddle Aeronautical University, Daytona Beach	318	Western Michigan University	239
2008	Middle Tennessee State University		Embry–Riddle Aeronautical University, Prescott	465	University of North Dakota	349	Embry–Riddle Aeronautical University, Daytona Beach	332	Western Michigan University	281
2009	Saint Louis University		University of North Dakota	469	Embry–Riddle Aeronautical University, Daytona Beach	398	Western Michigan University	291	Embry–Riddle Aeronautical University, Prescott	288
2010	Indiana State University		University of North Dakota	474	Embry–Riddle Aeronautical University, Daytona Beach	375	Embry–Riddle Aeronautical University, Prescott	294	Southern Illinois University	271
2011	Ohio State University		Southern Illinois University	414	University of North Dakota	405	Embry–Riddle Aeronautical University, Prescott	271	Western Michigan University	212
2012	Kansas State		Embry–Riddle Aeronautical University, Prescott	500	University of North Dakota	382	Southern Illinois University	319	Western Michigan University	268
2013	Ohio State University		Embry–Riddle Aeronautical University, Prescott	359	University of North Dakota	355	Southern Illinois University	293	Embry–Riddle Aeronautical University, Daytona Beach	226
2014	Ohio State University		Southern Illinois University(5)	349	Embry–Riddle Aeronautical University, Prescott	318	University of North Dakota	317	Western Michigan University	283
2015	Ohio State University		Southern Illinois University	430	University of North Dakota	395	Embry–Riddle Aeronautical University, Prescott	366	Western Michigan University	234
2016	Ohio State University		Embry–Riddle Aeronautical University, Prescott	471.50	Southern Illinois University	435	University of North Dakota	402	Ohio State University	339
2017	Ohio State University		Embry–Riddle Aeronautical University, Prescott	500	University of North Dakota	400	Southern Illinois University	261	Western Michigan University	283
2018	Indiana State University		Embry–Riddle Aeronautical University, Prescott	544	University of North Dakota	423	Southern Illinois University	273	Embry–Riddle Aeronautical University, Daytona Beach	197
2019	University of Wisconsin - Madison	University of North Dakota	484.5	Southern Illinois University	430	Embry-Riddle Aeronautical University, Prescott	308	LeTourneau University	290	
2020	EAA - Wittman Regional Airport	Event Cancelled due to COVID-19 Virus								
2021			Embry-Riddle Aeronautical University, Prescott							
2022			Embry-Riddle Aeronautical University, Prescott							
2023										
2024										
2025										
2026			Southern Illinois University							

== Current member clubs and schools ==
Region I – (CO, UT, and MT)

Metropolitan State University of Denver
Utah Valley University
Utah State University

AIMS Community College United States Air Force Academy Colorado Northwestern Community College Rocky Mountain College

Region II – (AZ, CA)

Cochise College Mt. San Antonio College San Jose State University

Embry-Riddle Aeronautical University - Prescott California Baptist University California Aeronautical University

Region III – (MI, OH)

Bowling Green State University
Kent State University
Ohio University
Ohio State University
Western Michigan University

Region IV – (OK, LA, and TX)

Central Texas College
Delta State University
Hinds Community College
Louisiana Tech University
LeTourneau University
Southeastern Oklahoma State University
Texas State Technical College – Waco
University of Louisiana at Monroe

Region V – (IA, MN, ND, SD, and WI)

Iowa State University
Minnesota State University, Mankato
University of Dubuque
University of North Dakota
University of Wisconsin–Madison

Region VI – (KS, MO, NE, and OK)

Kansas State University Polytechnic Campus
Oklahoma State University–Stillwater
Saint Louis University
Spartan College of Aeronautics and Technology
Southeastern Oklahoma State University
University of Central Missouri
University of Nebraska Omaha
University of Oklahoma

Region VII – (CT, DE, ME, MA, NH, NJ, NY, RI, and VT)

Bridgewater State University
Delaware State University
Dowling College
Farmingdale State College
Rensselaer Polytechnic Institute
Schenectady County Community College
United States Coast Guard Academy
United States Military Academy

Region VIII – (IL, IN, KY and TN)

Indiana State University
Lewis University
Middle Tennessee State University
Purdue University
Quincy University
Southern Illinois University Carbondale

Region IX – (AL, FL, and GA)

Auburn University
Broward College
Embry–Riddle Aeronautical University, Daytona Beach
Florida Institute of Technology
Florida Memorial University
Jacksonville University
Lynn University
Miami Dade College
Polk State College

Region X – (DC, MD, NC, SC, and VA)

Averett University
Elizabeth City State University
Caldwell Community College & Technical Institute
Guilford Technical Community College
Hampton University
Liberty University
United States Naval Academy
