= 2003–04 Mid-American Conference women's basketball season =

- League: NCAA Division I
- Sport: Basketball
- Number of teams: 13

Regular season
- Champions: Miami (OH)
- Season MVP: Casey Rost

Tournament
- Champions: Eastern Michigan
- Runners-up: Bowling Green
- Finals MVP: Ryan Coleman

Mid-American women's basketball seasons
- ← 2002–03 2004–05 →

2003–04 Mid-American Conference women's basketball standings
	Conf.				Overall
Team	W		L	PCT	W		L	PCT
Miami (OH)	13	–	2	.867	22	–	9	.710
Kent State	12	–	4	.750	18	–	11	.621
Marshall	8	–	8	.500	18	–	12	.600
Ohio	7	–	9	.438	13	–	15	.464
Buffalo	4	–	12	.250	6	–	21	.222
Akron	2	–	14	.125	7	–	21	.250
West
Eastern Michigan†	12	–	4	.750	22	–	7	.759
Bowling Green	11	–	5	.688	21	–	10	.677
Western Michigan	11	–	5	.688	18	–	12	.600
Toledo	8	–	7	.533	13	–	16	.448
Ball State	7	–	9	.438	14	–	15	.483
Northern Illinois	7	–	9	.438	11	–	16	.407
Central Michigan	1	–	15	.063	5	–	23	.179
† 2004 MAC tournament winner Rankings from AP poll

The 2003–04 Mid-American Conference women's basketball season began with practices in October 2003, followed by the start of the 2002–03 NCAA Division I women's basketball season in November. Conference play began in January 2004 and concluded in March 2004. Miami won the regular season title with a record of 13–2. Casey Rost of Western Michigan was MAC player of the year.

Second seeded Eastern Michigan won the MAC tournament over seventh seeded Bowling Green. Ryan Coleman of Eastern Michigan was the tournament MVP. Eastern Michigan lost to Kentucky in the first round of the NCAA tournament. Miami, Kent State, and Western Michigan played in the WNIT.

== Preseason Awards ==
The preseason poll was announced by the league office on October 22, 2003.

=== Preseason women's basketball poll ===
==== East Division ====
Kent State

==== West Division ====
Western Michigan

=== Honors ===
Honor	Recipient
Preseason All-MAC East	Jessica Kochendorfer, Buffalo
Preseason All-MAC East	Andrea Csaszar, Kent State
Preseason All-MAC East	Catie Knable, Marshall
Preseason All-MAC East	Sikeetha Shepard-Hall, Marshall
Preseason All-MAC East	Colleen Day, Miami
Preseason All-MAC West	Johna Goff, Ball State
Preseason All-MAC West	Ryan Coleman, Eastern Michigan
Preseason All-MAC West	Jennifer Youngblood, Northern Illinois
Preseason All-MAC West	Kelly Walker, Toledo
Preseason All-MAC West	Casey Rost, Western Michigan

== Postseason ==
=== Postseason Awards ===
1. Coach of the Year: Maria Fantanarosa, Miami
2. Player of the Year: Casey Rost, Western Michigan
3. Freshman of the Year: Ali Mann, Bowling Green
4. Defensive Player of the Year: Lindsay Austin, Bowling Green
5. Sixth Man of the Year: Sarah VanMetre, Eastern Michigan

=== Honors ===
Honor	Recipient
Postseason All-MAC First Team	Ryan Coleman, Eastern Michigan
Postseason All-MAC First Team	Colleen Day, Miami
Postseason All-MAC First Team	Kate Endress, Ball State
Postseason All-MAC First Team	Casey Rost, Western Michigan
Postseason All-MAC First Team	Lindsay Shearer, Kent State
Postseason All-MAC Second Team	Andrea Csaszar, Kent State
Postseason All-MAC Second Team	Nikki Knapp, Eastern Michigan
Postseason All-MAC Second Team	Kim Lancaster, Miami
Postseason All-MAC Second Team	Cindi Merrill, Miami
Postseason All-MAC Second Team	Stefanie Wenzel, Bowling Green
Postseason All-MAC Honorable Mention	Lindsay Austin, Bowling Green
Postseason All-MAC Honorable Mention	Marion Crandall, Eastern Michigan
Postseason All-MAC Honorable Mention	Johna Goff, Ball State
Postseason All-MAC Honorable Mention	Karin Hoogendam, Toledo
Postseason All-MAC Honorable Mention	Maria Jilian, Western Michigan
Postseason All-MAC Honorable Mention	Jessica Kochendorfer, Buffalo
Postseason All-MAC Honorable Mention	Ali Mann, Bowling Green
Postseason All-MAC Honorable Mention	Sikeetha Shepard-Hall, Marshall
Postseason All-MAC Honorable Mention	Kelly Walker, Toledo
Postseason All-MAC Honorable Mention	Jennifer Youngblood, Northern Illinois
All-MAC Freshman Team	Amanda Jackson, Miami
All-MAC Freshman Team	Ali Mann, Bowling Green
All-MAC Freshman Team	Carrie Moore, Western Michigan
All-MAC Freshman Team	Stephanie Raymond, Northern Illinois
All-MAC Freshman Team	Sarah VanMetre, Eastern Michigan

== See also ==
2003–04 Mid-American Conference men's basketball season
