= 2003–04 LSU Lady Tigers basketball team =

Intercollegiate basketball season

2003–04 LSU Lady Tigers basketball

NCAA Women's Tournament, Final Four
- Conference: Southeastern Conference

Ranking
- Coaches: No. 4
- AP: No. 19
- Record: 27–8 (10–4 SEC)
- Head coach: Sue Gunter (22nd season)
- Assistant coaches: Bob Starkey; Pokey Chatman; Carla Berry
- Home arena: Pete Maravich Assembly Center

The 2003–04 LSU Lady Tigers basketball team represented Louisiana State University during the 2003–04 NCAA Division I women's basketball season college basketball season. The Lady Tigers, were led by 22nd-year head coach Sue Gunter, played their home games at Pete Maravich Assembly Center, and were members of the Southeastern Conference. They finished the season 27–8, 10–4 in SEC play to finish second in the conference regular season standings. As the two seed in the SEC women's tournament, they lost in the semifinal round to Vanderbilt. They received an at-large bid to the NCAA women's tournament as the No. 4 seed in the West region. The Lady Tigers defeated Austin Peay, Maryland, No. 1 seed Texas, and Georgia to reach the first NCAA Final Four in program history. LSU was beaten in the National semifinals by Tennessee.

== Roster ==
2003–04 LSU Tigers women's basketball team
Players
Coaches

Pos.	#	Name	Height	Year	Previous school	Hometown
G	2	Temeka Johnson	5 ft 3 in (1.6 m)	Jr	Bonnabel	New Orleans, LA
G	10	Khaliah Mitchell	5 ft 11 in (1.8 m)	Fr	St. Mary's	New Orleans, LA
G	11	Amber Long	5 ft 6 in (1.68 m)	Fr	Dutch Fork	Irmo, SC
F	22	Florence Williams	6 ft 1 in (1.85 m)	Jr	Miami Edison	Miami, FL
G	24	Marian Whitfield	5 ft 9 in (1.75 m)	Fr	Glenn Hills	Augusta, GA
G	32	Scholanda Dorrell	5 ft 10 in (1.78 m)	So	Miami Edison	Miami, FL
G	33	Seimone Augustus	6 ft 1 in (1.85 m)	So	Capitol	Baton Rouge, LA
F	34	Wendlyn Jones	6 ft 1 in (1.85 m)	So	Blytheville	Blytheville, AR
F	42	Hanna Biernacka	6 ft 1 in (1.85 m)	Fr	Telge Emergi Club	Stockholm, Sweden
G	45	Doneeka Hodges	5 ft 9 in (1.75 m)	Sr	O. P. Walker	New Orleans, LA
C	50	Treynell Clavelle	6 ft 4 in (1.93 m)	So	Jeanerette	Jeanerette, LA
F	52	Tillie Willis	6 ft 3 in (1.91 m)	Sr	Cumberland Christian	Mableton, GA
C	55	Crystal White	6 ft 5 in (1.96 m)	Jr	Mount Clemens; Duke	Mount Clemens, MI

Head coach

- Sue Gunter

Assistant coach(es)

- Pokey Chatman (LSU)
- Bob Starkey
- Carla Berry

Legend

- (C) Team captain
- (S) Suspended
- (I) Ineligible
- (W) Walk-on
- Injured
- Current redshirt

Roster

== Schedule and results ==
Date time, TV	Rank^{#}	Opponent^{#}	Result	Record	Site (attendance) city, state
Regular season
Feb 29, 2004*	No. 15	vs. No. 2 Tennessee	L 62–85	22–6 (10–4)	Thompson–Boling Arena (20,090); Knoxville, TN
SEC Women's Tournament
Mar 5, 2004*	(2) No. 19	vs. (7) Ole Miss; Quarterfinals	W 79–66	23–6	Gaylord Entertainment Center (7,840); Nashville, TN
Mar 6, 2004*	(2) No. 19	vs. (3) No. 21 Vanderbilt; Semifinals	L 66–78	23–7	Gaylord Entertainment Center (10,443); Nashville, TN
NCAA Tournament
Mar 21, 2004*	(4 W) No. 19	vs. (13 W) Austin Peay; First round	W 83–66	24–7	Maravich Assembly Center (5,849); Baton Rouge, Louisiana
Mar 23, 2004*	(4 W) No. 19	vs. (5 W) Maryland; Second round	W 76–61	25–7	Maravich Assembly Center (6,192); Baton Rouge, Louisiana
Mar 27, 2004*	(4 W) No. 19	vs. (1 W) No. 4 Texas; Regional Semifinal – Sweet Sixteen	W 71–55	26–7	Bank of America Arena (4,620); Seattle, WA
Mar 29, 2004*	(4 W) No. 19	vs. (3 W) No. 16 Georgia; Regional Final – Elite Eight	W 62–60	27–7	Bank of America Arena (4,745); Seattle, WA
Apr 4, 2004*	(4 W) No. 19	vs. (1 MW) No. 2 Tennessee; National Semifinal – Final Four	L 50–52	27–8	New Orleans Arena (18,211); New Orleans, LA
*Non-conference game. ^{#}Rankings from AP Poll. (#) Tournament seedings in parentheses. W=West Region. All times are in Central Time.

== Rankings ==
2003–04 NCAA Division I women's basketball rankings
