= 2003–04 Minnesota Golden Gophers women's basketball team =

Intercollegiate basketball season

2003–04 Minnesota Golden Gophers women's basketball

Subway Basketball Classic champions, Junkanoo Jam champions, Cavalier Classic champions

NCAA Tournament, Final Four
- Conference: Big Ten Conference

Ranking
- Coaches: No. 13
- AP: No. 24
- Record: 25–9 (9–7 Big Ten)
- Head coach: Pam Borton (2nd season)
- Assistant coaches: Melissa McFerrin; Dave Stromme; Danielle O'Banion
- Home arena: Williams Arena

2003–04 Big Ten women's basketball standings
| | Conf. | | | | Overall |
| Team | W | | L | PCT | W | | L | PCT |
|---|---|---|---|---|---|---|---|---|
| No. 5 Penn State | 15 | – | 1 | .938 | 28 | – | 6 | .824 |
| No. 3 Purdue † | 14 | – | 2 | .875 | 29 | – | 4 | .879 |
| No. 21 Ohio State | 11 | – | 5 | .688 | 21 | – | 10 | .677 |
| No. 23 Michigan State | 10 | – | 6 | .625 | 22 | – | 9 | .710 |
| Iowa | 10 | – | 6 | .625 | 16 | – | 13 | .552 |
| No. 24 Minnesota | 9 | – | 7 | .563 | 25 | – | 9 | .735 |
| Michigan | 6 | – | 10 | .375 | 14 | – | 17 | .452 |
| Indiana | 4 | – | 12 | .250 | 12 | – | 17 | .414 |
| Illinois | 4 | – | 12 | .250 | 10 | – | 18 | .357 |
| Wisconsin | 4 | – | 12 | .250 | 10 | – | 17 | .370 |
| Northwestern | 1 | – | 15 | .063 | 8 | – | 20 | .286 |
† 2004 Big Ten tournament winner As of March 13, 2004; Rankings from AP Poll

The 2003–04 Minnesota Golden Gophers women's basketball team represented the University of Minnesota during the 2003–04 NCAA Division I women's basketball season. The Golden Gophers, led by second-year head coach Pam Borton, played their home games at Williams Arena as members of the Big Ten Conference. They finished the season 25–9, 9–7 in Big Ten play to finish in sixth place. They defeated Iowa in the quarterfinals of the Big Ten women's tournament before losing to Ohio State in the semifinals. They received an at-large bid to the NCAA women's tournament as the No. 7 seed in the Mideast region. There they defeated UCLA, Kansas State, Boston College, and Duke to reach the first Final Four in program history. In the National Semifinal round, they were beaten by eventual National champion UConn, 67–58.

== Roster ==
2003–04 Minnesota Golden Gophers women's basketball team
Players
Coaches

| Pos. | # | Name | Height | Year | Previous school | Hometown |
|---|---|---|---|---|---|---|
| G | 3 | Kelly Roysland | 5 ft 9 in (1.75 m) | Fr | Fosston H.S. | Fosston, Minnesota |
| C | 4 | Janel McCarville | 6 ft 2 in (1.88 m) | Jr | Stevens Point Senior High | Stevens Point, Wisconsin |
| G | 11 | Shannon Schonrock | 5 ft 6 in (1.68 m) | So | Blue Earth Area | Winnebago, Minnesota |
| G | 13 | Lindsay Whalen | 5 ft 9 in (1.75 m) | Sr | Hutchinson H.S. | Hutchinson, Minnesota |
| F | 20 | Leslie Hill | 5 ft 10 in (1.78 m) | Sr | George Washington | Chicago, Illinois |
| G/F | 22 | Shannon Bolden | 5 ft 11 in (1.8 m) | So | Marshall Senior High | Marshall, Minnesota |
| G/F | 23 | Tanisha Gilbert | 5 ft 11 in (1.8 m) | Jr | Champlin Park | Brooklyn Park, Minnesota |
| G | 24 | Lori Dimitroff | 5 ft 9 in (1.75 m) | Sr | Maple Grove (H.S.); St. Cloud State | Maple Grove, Minnesota |
| G | 31 | Hannah Garry | 5 ft 5 in (1.65 m) | So | Stewartville H.S. | Stewartville, Minnesota |
| G/F | 33 | Jamie Broback | 6 ft 3 in (1.91 m) | Fr | Eastview | Apple Valley, MN |
| F | 35 | Kadidja Andersson | 5 ft 11 in (1.8 m) | Sr | Brännkyrka Gymnasium | Stockholm, Sweden |
| C | 50 | Christina Collison | 6 ft 2 in (1.88 m) | So | Eden Prairie H.S. | Eden Prairie, Minnesota |
| F/C | 55 | Liz Podominick | 6 ft 2 in (1.88 m) | Fr | Lakeville North | Lakeville, MN |

Head coach

- Pam Borton (Ohio)

Assistant coach(es)

- Melissa McFerrin (Missouri)
- Dave Stromme (St. Olaf)
- Danielle O'Banion (Boston College)

Legend

- (C) Team captain
- (S) Suspended
- (I) Ineligible
- (W) Walk-on
- Injured
- Current redshirt

Roster

== Schedule and results ==
| Date time, TV | Rank^{#} | Opponent^{#} | Result | Record | Site city, state |
Non-conference regular season
| November 22, 2003* | No. 13 | Southern; Subway Basketball Classic – Semifinals | W 93–41 | 1–0 | Williams Arena; Minneapolis, Minnesota |
| November 23, 2003* | No. 13 | No. 16 Colorado; Subway Basketball Classic – Championship Game | W 95–61 | 2–0 | Williams Arena; Minneapolis, Minnesota |
| November 25, 2003* | No. 11 | at Drake | W 73–50 | 3–0 | Knapp Center; Des Moines, Iowa |
| November 28, 2003* | No. 11 | vs. Texas A&M; Junkanoo Jam (Freeport Division) – Semifinals | W 88–72 | 4–0 | St. George's Gymnasium; Freeport, The Bahamas |
| November 29, 2003* | No. 11 | vs. USC; Junkanoo Jam (Freeport Division) – Championship Game | W 84–51 | 5–0 | St. George's Gymnasium; Freeport, The Bahamas |
| December 04, 2003* | No. 9 | Creighton | W 82–71 | 6–0 | Williams Arena; Minneapolis, Minnesota |
| December 07, 2003* | No. 9 | at Kansas City | W 79–53 | 7–0 | Municipal Auditorium; Kansas City, Missouri |
| December 21, 2003* | No. 9 | Green Bay | W 75–55 | 8–0 | Williams Arena; Minneapolis, Minnesota |
| December 28, 2003* | No. 7 | vs. Georgia State; Cavalier Classic – Semifinals | W 81–52 | 9–0 | University Hall; Charlottesville, Virginia |
| December 29, 2003* | No. 7 | at Virginia; Cavalier Classic – Championship Game | W 73–53 | 10–0 | University Hall; Charlottesville, Virginia |
Big Ten regular season
| January 01, 2004 | No. 6 | Michigan | W 64–44 | 11–0 (1–0) | Williams Arena; Minneapolis, Minnesota |
| January 03, 2004*; 4:00 pm, CBS | No. 6 | South Carolina | W 63–53 | 12–0 | Williams Arena; Minneapolis, Minnesota |
| January 8, 2004 | No. 6 | at Northwestern | W 72–40 | 13–0 (2–0) | Welsh–Ryan Arena; Evanston, Illinois |
| January 11, 2004 | No. 6 | Iowa | W 74–59 | 14–0 (3–0) | Williams Arena; Minneapolis, Minnesota |
| January 15, 2004 | No. 6 | Illinois | W 74–59 | 15–0 (4–0) | Williams Arena; Minneapolis, Minnesota |
| January 18, 2004 | No. 6 | at No. 9 Purdue | L 56–65 | 15–1 (4–1) | Mackey Arena; West Lafayette, Indiana |
| January 22, 2004 | No. 9 | at No. 7 Penn State | L 56–75 | 15–2 (4–2) | Bryce Jordan Center; University Park, Pennsylvania |
| January 25, 2004 | No. 9 | No. 20 Michigan State | L 69–72 | 15–3 (4–3) | Williams Arena; Minneapolis, Minnesota |
| January 29, 2004 | No. 14 | Indiana | W 78–46 | 16–3 (5–3) | Williams Arena; Minneapolis, Minnesota |
| February 01, 2004 | No. 14 | at Wisconsin | W 59–48 | 17–3 (6–3) | Kohl Center; Madison, Wisconsin |
| February 08, 2004 | No. 13 | No. 5 Penn State | W 74–56 | 18–3 (7–3) | Williams Arena (14,363); Minneapolis, Minnesota |
| February 12, 2004 | No. 10 | at Ohio State | L 57–75 | 18–4 (7–4) | Value City Arena; Columbus, Ohio |
| February 15, 2004 | No. 10 | at Illinois | W 63–54 | 19–4 (8–4) | Assembly Hall; Champaign, Illinois |
| February 19, 2004 | No. 11 | at Iowa | L 61–81 | 19–5 (8–5) | Carver–Hawkeye Arena; Iowa City, Iowa |
| February 22, 2004 | No. 11 | Northwestern | W 73–46 | 20–5 (9–5) | Williams Arena; Minneapolis, Minnesota |
| February 26, 2004 | No. 12 | No. 25 Ohio State | L 62–76 | 20–6 (9–6) | Williams Arena; Minneapolis, Minnesota |
| February 29, 2004 | No. 12 | at Michigan | L 47–57 | 20–7 (9–7) | Crisler Arena; Ann Arbor, Michigan |
Big Ten Tournament
| March 04, 2004*; 9:00 pm, FSN Chicago | (6) No. 18 | vs. (11) Northwestern; First Round | W 68–47 | 21–7 | Conseco Fieldhouse; Indianapolis, Indiana |
| March 05, 2004*; 8:30 pm, FSN Chicago | (6) No. 18 | vs. (3) No. 22 Ohio State; Quarterfinals | L 50–58 | 21–8 | Conseco Fieldhouse; Indianapolis, Indiana |
NCAA Tournament
| March 21, 2004*; 2:30 pm, ESPN2 | (7 ME) No. 24 | (10 ME) UCLA; First Round | W 92–81 | 22–8 | Williams Arena; Minneapolis, Minnesota |
| March 23, 2004*; 9:00 pm, ESPN | (7 ME) No. 24 | (2 ME) No. 8 Kansas State; Second Round | W 80–61 | 23–8 | Williams Arena; Minneapolis, Minnesota |
| March 28, 2004*; 2:30 pm, ESPN2 | (7 ME) No. 24 | vs. (3 ME) No. 18 Boston College; Sweet Sixteen | W 76–63 | 24–8 | Constant Convocation Center; Norfolk, Virginia |
| March 30, 2004*; 7:00 pm, ESPN | (7 ME) No. 24 | vs. (1 ME) No. 1 Duke; Elite Eight | W 82–75 | 25–8 | Constant Convocation Center; Norfolk, Virginia |
| April 04, 2004; 9:33 pm, ESPN | (7 ME) No. 24 | (2 E) No. 6 UConn; Final Four | L 58–67 | 25–9 | New Orleans Arena (18,211); New Orleans, Louisiana |
*Non-conference game. ^{#}Rankings from AP Poll. (#) Tournament seedings in parentheses. All times are in Eastern Time. ME = Mid-East, E = East.

== Rankings ==
Ranking movements Legend: ██ Increase in ranking ██ Decrease in ranking т = Tied with team above or below
| | Week | | | | | | | | | | | | | | | | | | | |
| Poll | Pre | 1 | 2 | 3 | 4 | 5 | 6 | 7 | 8 | 9 | 10 | 11 | 12 | 13 | 14 | 15 | 16 | 17 | 18 | Final |
|---|---|---|---|---|---|---|---|---|---|---|---|---|---|---|---|---|---|---|---|---|
| AP | 13 | 13 | 11 | 9 | 9 | 9 | 7 | 6 | 6 | 6 | 9T | 14 | 13 | 10 | 11 | 12 | 18 | 22 | 24 | Not released |
| Coaches | 17 | 17 | 17 | 14 | 13 | 12 | 11 | 10 | 11 | 11 | 10 | 14 | 16 | 18 | 17 | 14 | 14 | 18 | 18 | 13 |

== See also ==
- 2003–04 Minnesota Golden Gophers men's basketball team
