= 2004 MAC women's basketball tournament =

- Classification: Division I
- Teams: 13
- Site: Gund Arena; Cleveland, Ohio
- Champions: Eastern Michigan
- Winning coach: Suzy Merchant
- MVP: Ryan Coleman (Eastern Michigan)
- MAC women's basketball tournaments

2003–04 Mid-American Conference women's basketball standings
	Conf.				Overall
Team	W		L	PCT	W		L	PCT
Miami (OH)	13	–	2	.867	22	–	9	.710
Kent State	12	–	4	.750	18	–	11	.621
Marshall	8	–	8	.500	18	–	12	.600
Ohio	7	–	9	.438	13	–	15	.464
Buffalo	4	–	12	.250	6	–	21	.222
Akron	2	–	14	.125	7	–	21	.250
West
Eastern Michigan†	12	–	4	.750	22	–	7	.759
Bowling Green	11	–	5	.688	21	–	10	.677
Western Michigan	11	–	5	.688	18	–	12	.600
Toledo	8	–	7	.533	13	–	16	.448
Ball State	7	–	9	.438	14	–	15	.483
Northern Illinois	7	–	9	.438	11	–	16	.407
Central Michigan	1	–	15	.063	5	–	23	.179
† 2004 MAC tournament winner Rankings from AP poll

The 2004 Mid-American Conference women's basketball tournament was the post-season basketball tournament for the Mid-American Conference (MAC) 2003–04 college basketball season. The 2004 tournament was held March 6–13, 2004. Eastern Michigan won the championship over Bowling Green. Ryan Coleman of Eastern Michigan was the MVP.

== Format ==
The top three seeds received byes into the quarterfinals. The first round was played at campus sites. All other rounds were held at Gund Arena.

== Bracket ==
First round March 5, 2004
8	Northern Illinois	71
9	Ball State	80
4	Bowling Green	89
13	Central Michigan	54
5	Western Michigan	89
12	Akron	67
7	Toledo	68
10	Ohio	65
6	Marshall	69
11	Buffalo	45

Quarterfinals; March 8, 2004
1	Miami	85
9	Ball State	71
4	Bowling Green	63
5	Western Michigan	62
2	Eastern Michigan	60
7	Toledo	47
3	Kent State	58
6	Marshall	64

Semifinals; March 12, 2004
1	Miami	74
4	Bowling Green	75
2	Eastern Michigan	75
3	Marshall	70

Championship; March 13, 2004
7	Bowling Green	56
2	Eastern Michigan	65
