= 2007–08 Mid-American Conference women's basketball season =

- League: NCAA Division I
- Sport: Basketball
- Teams: 12

Regular season
- Champions: Bowling Green
- Runners-up: Miami
- Season MVP: Kate Achter

Tournament
- Champions: Miami
- Runners-up: Ohio
- Finals MVP: Amanda Jackson

Mid-American women's basketball seasons
- ← 2006–07 2008–09 →

2007–08 Mid-American Conference women's basketball standings
| | Conf. | | | | Overall |
| Team | W | | L | PCT | W | | L | PCT |
|---|---|---|---|---|---|---|---|---|
| Bowling Green | 13 | – | 3 | .813 | 25 | – | 7 | .781 |
| Miami (OH)† | 12 | – | 4 | .750 | 23 | – | 10 | .697 |
| Ohio | 10 | – | 6 | .625 | 20 | – | 13 | .606 |
| Buffalo | 8 | – | 8 | .500 | 15 | – | 15 | .500 |
| Kent State | 5 | – | 11 | .313 | 9 | – | 21 | .300 |
| Akron | 2 | – | 14 | .125 | 7 | – | 24 | .226 |
West
| Eastern Michigan | 11 | – | 5 | .688 | 17 | – | 12 | .586 |
| Ball State | 11 | – | 5 | .688 | 15 | – | 15 | .500 |
| Western Michigan | 9 | – | 7 | .563 | 13 | – | 19 | .406 |
| Northern Illinois | 6 | – | 8 | .429 | 10 | – | 18 | .357 |
| Toledo | 5 | – | 10 | .333 | 14 | – | 16 | .467 |
| Central Michigan | 2 | – | 13 | .133 | 6 | – | 23 | .207 |
† 2008 MAC tournament winner Rankings from AP poll

The 2007–08 Mid-American Conference women's basketball season began with practices in October 2007, followed by the start of the 2007–08 NCAA Division I women's basketball season in November. Conference play began in January 2008 and concluded in March 2008. Bowling Green won the regular season title with a record of 13–3 by one game over Miami. Kate Achter of Bowling Green was named MAC player of the year.

Miami won the MAC tournament over Ohio. Amanda Jackson of Miami was the tournament MVP. Miami lost to Louisville in the first round of the NCAA tournament. Bowling Green played in the WNIT.

== Preseason awards ==
The preseason poll was announced by the league office on October 18, 2007.

=== Preseason women's basketball poll ===
(First place votes in parentheses)

==== East Division ====
1. Ohio
2. Bowling Green
3. Miami
4. Kent State
5. Buffalo
6. Akron

==== West Division ====
1. Ball State
2. Northern Illinois
3. Eastern Michigan
4. Western Michigan
5. Toledo
6. Central Michigan

=== Honors ===
| Honor | Recipient |
|---|---|
| Preseason All-MAC East | Kate Achter, Bowling Green |
| Preseason All-MAC East | Lauren Kohn, Ohio |
| Preseason All-MAC East | Amanda Jackson, Miami |
| Preseason All-MAC East | Sarah Tokodi, Akron |
| Preseason All-MAC East | Heather Turner, Buffalo |
| Preseason All-MAC West | Julie DeMuth, Ball State |
| Preseason All-MAC West | Tiera DeLaHoussaye, Western Michigan |
| Preseason All-MAC West | Porchia Green, Ball State |
| Preseason All-MAC West | Alyssa Pittman, Eastern Michigan |
| Preseason All-MAC West | Jessie Wilcox, Northern Illinois |

== Postseason ==
=== Postseason awards ===
1. Coach of the Year: Curt Miller, Bowling Green
2. Player of the Year: Kate Achter, Bowling Green
3. Freshman of the Year: Lauren Prochaska, Bowling Green
4. Defensive Player of the Year: Tiera DeLaHoussaye, Western Michigan
5. Sixth Man of the Year: Emily Maggert, Ball State

=== Honors ===
| Honor | Recipient |
|---|---|
| Postseason All-MAC First Team | Kate Achter, Guard, Bowling Green |
| Postseason All-MAC First Team | Tiera DeLaHoussaye, Guard, Western Michigan |
| Postseason All-MAC First Team | Porchia Green, Guard, Ball State |
| Postseason All-MAC First Team | Amanda Jackson, Guard, Miami |
| Postseason All-MAC First Team | Lauren Kohn, Forward, Ohio |
| Postseason All-MAC Second Team | Stephanie Bennett, Guard, Buffalo |
| Postseason All-MAC Second Team | Whitney Lowe, Forward, Northern Illinois |
| Postseason All-MAC Second Team | Lauren Prochaska, Guard, Bowling Green |
| Postseason All-MAC Second Team | Colleen Russell, Center, Eastern Michigan |
| Postseason All-MAC Second Team | Jenna Schone, Guard, Miami |
| Postseason All-MAC Third Team | Julie DeMuth, Forward, Ball State |
| Postseason All-MAC Third Team | Anna Kowalska, Center, Kent State |
| Postseason All-MAC Third Team | Britni Houghton, Forward, Central Michigan |
| Postseason All-MAC Third Team | Laura Markwood, Guard, Miami |
| Postseason All-MAC Third Team | Kara Murphy, Guard, Akron |
| Postseason All-MAC Honorable Mention | Chenel Harris, Guard, Kent State |
| Postseason All-MAC Honorable Mention | Alyssa Pittman, Guard, Eastern Michigan |
| Postseason All-MAC Honorable Mention | Lisa Rusche, Forward/Center, Ball State |
| Postseason All-MAC Honorable Mention | Tamesha Scotton, Guard, Toledo |
| Postseason All-MAC Honorable Mention | Heather Turner, Center/Forward, Buffalo |
| All-MAC Freshman Team | Chenel Harris, Guard, Kent State |
| All-MAC Freshman Team | Kara Murphy, Guard, Akron |
| All-MAC Freshman Team | Emily Maggert, Forward/Center, Ball State |
| All-MAC Freshman Team | Lauren Prochaska, Guard, Bowling Green |
| All-MAC Freshman Team | Keyla Snowden, Guard, Akron |

== See also ==
2007–08 Mid-American Conference men's basketball season
