= Sue Gunter =

American basketball coach (1939–2005)

Biographical details
- Born: May 22, 1939; Walnut Grove, Mississippi, U.S.
- Died: August 4, 2005 (aged 66); Baton Rouge, Louisiana, U.S.

Coaching career (HC unless noted)
- 1962–1964: Middle Tennessee
- 1964–1980: Stephen F. Austin
- 1982–2004: LSU

Head coaching record
- Overall: MTSU 44–0 (1.000); SFA 266–87 (.754); LSU 442–221 (.667); NCAA 708–308 (.697); All 752–308 (.709)

Accomplishments and honors

Championships
- 2× SEC tournament champion (1991, 2003); WNIT champion (1985)

Awards
- 2× SEC Coach of the Year (1997, 1999)
- Basketball Hall of Fame; Inducted in 2005
- Women's Basketball Hall of Fame
Medal record
Women's basketball
Assistant coach for United States
Olympic Games
Silver medal – second place	1976 Montreal	Team competition

Sue Gunter (May 22, 1939 – August 4, 2005) was an American women's college basketball coach. She is best known as the head coach of the Louisiana State University (LSU) Lady Tigers basketball team. Gunter was inducted into the Women's Basketball Hall of Fame in 2000.

== AAU and USA Basketball player ==
A fine player in her own right, Gunter played Amateur Athletic Union (AAU) basketball for Nashville Business College from 1958 to 1962 earning AAU All-America honors in 1960. She attended George Peabody College for Teachers (now part of Vanderbilt University), with Nera White. Gunter obtained both a bachelor's and a master's degree from Peabody in 1962. George Peabody did not have a women's basketball team, so she played for the AAU team in Nashville sponsored by Nashville Business College. She was also a member of the U.S. National Team, which competed against the Soviet Union, from 1960 to 1962.

== College coaching ==
Gunter began her coaching career at Middle Tennessee State University where she led the Blue Raiders to undefeated seasons in both of her years there (1962–1964). Gunter then had a very successful coaching stint at Stephen F. Austin State University (SFA) in Nacogdoches, Texas. While at SFA, Gunter led the LadyJacks to a 266-87 mark in 16 years as head coach (1964–1980). In addition, she led SFA to four top 10 national rankings, including top 5 final rankings in 1979 and 1980. While at SFA, Gunter coached four sports—women's basketball, softball, tennis and track. Her basketball teams went to five Association of Intercollegiate Athletics for Women (AIAW) playoffs, won four state titles, and earned a regional crown. In 1980, she stepped down as coach at SFA and moved into the position of Director of Women's Athletics where she served two years before returning to the coaching ranks at LSU.

In Gunter's 22 years as the head coach at LSU (1982–2004), the Lady Tigers played in 14 NCAA Tournaments and two WNITs. Gunter led LSU to one Final Four in 2004 and to the Elite Eight in 1986, 2000 and 2003. She led the Lady Tigers to a championship at the WNIT in 1985 and to SEC Tournament Championships in 1991 and 2003. In addition, Gunter directed LSU to 14 seasons of 20 or more wins, including one 30-win season.

Gunter took a medical leave of absence in the middle of the 2003-2004 season. She was later diagnosed as having emphysema and pneumonia. Assistant head coach Pokey Chatman, who had played for Gunter from 1987 to 1991 and had been an assistant since 1991 (the first year as a student assistant), became interim coach for the rest of the season. The Tigers went 15-5 under Chatman's watch and reached the Final Four for the first time in school history. However, LSU credits the entire season to Gunter. When it was apparent that Gunter would not be able to return, she formally announced her retirement on April 27 and Chatman was named her successor.

Gunter completed her career as the third winningest women's basketball coach in NCAA history (at the time) with an overall record of 708-308 (behind only Jody Conradt and Pat Summitt). Gunter's LSU record was 442-221, making her the winningest coach in school history. She completed her career among the leaders in several NCAA coaching categories: seasons coached (No. 1 - 40); games coached (No. 3 - 1,016); wins (No. 3 - 708); and 20-win seasons (No. 4 - 22).

=== Head coaching record ===
Record table
Season	Team	Overall	Conference	Standing	Postseason
Middle Tennessee Blue Raiders () (1962–1964)
1962–1964	Middle Tennessee	44-0			
Middle Tennessee:		44–0 (1.000)			
Stephen F. Austin Ladyjacks () (1964–1980)
1968–1969	Stephen F. Austin	6-4			
1969–70	Stephen F. Austin	12-2			
1970–71	Stephen F. Austin	19-9			
1971–72	Stephen F. Austin	19-7			
1972–73	Stephen F. Austin	21-6			AIAW Elite Eight
1973–74	Stephen F. Austin	27-7			AIAW Elite Eight
1974–75	Stephen F. Austin	32-8			AIAW Sweet Sixteen
1975–76	Stephen F. Austin	20-13			
1976–77	Stephen F. Austin	28-6			
1977–78	Stephen F. Austin	25-14			AIAW Elite Eight
1978–79	Stephen F. Austin	30-5			
1979–80	Stephen F. Austin	27-6			AIAW Elite Eight
Stephen F. Austin:		266–87 (.754)			
LSU Lady Tigers (Southeastern Conference) (1982–2004)
1982–83	LSU	20–7	6–2		
1983–84	LSU	23–7	5–3		NCAA Sweet Sixteen
1984–85	LSU	20–9	4–4		NWIT Champions
1985–86	LSU	27–6	6–3		NCAA Elite Eight
1986–87	LSU	20–8	6–3		NCAA 2nd Round
1987–88	LSU	18–11	6–3		NCAA 1st Round
1988–89	LSU	19–11	5–4		NCAA Sweet Sixteen
1989–90	LSU	21–9	4–5		NCAA 1st Round
1990–91	LSU	24–7	4–5		NCAA 2nd Round
1991–92	LSU	16–13	4–7		
1992–93	LSU	9–18	0–11		
1993–94	LSU	11–16	2–9		
1994–95	LSU	7–20	1–10		
1995–96	LSU	21–11	4–7		NWIT Third Place
1996–97	LSU	25–5	9–3		NCAA Sweet Sixteen
1997–98	LSU	19–13	7–7		WNIT Final Four
1998–99	LSU	22–8	11–3		NCAA Sweet Sixteen
1999–00	LSU	22–8	11–3		NCAA Elite Eight
2000–01	LSU	20–11	8–6		NCAA 2nd Round
2001–02	LSU	18–12	8–6		NCAA 2nd Round
2002–03	LSU	30–4	11–3		NCAA Elite Eight
2003–04	LSU	27–8*	10–4*		NCAA Final Four*
LSU:		442–221 (.667)	132–111 (.543)		
Total:		708-308 (.697)			
National champion Postseason invitational champion Conference regular season champion Conference regular season and conference tournament champion Division regular season champion Division regular season and conference tournament champion Conference tournament champion

* Gunter went on medical leave in the middle of the 2003-04 season. Assistant Pokey Chatman coached the final 20 games of the season, but LSU credits the entire season to Gunter.

== USA Basketball coaching ==
In 1980, the United States Olympic Team selected Gunter as the head women's basketball coach. Gunter guided her team to the title at the Olympic Qualifying Tournament prior to the Games, however, they did not compete for a gold medal due to the United States' boycott of the Olympic Games in Moscow.

Gunter shared success at the Olympics, however, as an assistant coach of the 1976 U.S. Team which captured the silver medal in Montreal. She has also served as head coach for the U.S. National Team three times in 1976, 1978 and 1980.

== Awards and honors ==
While at LSU, Gunter was named the SEC's Coach of the Year in 1997 and 1999. She was also the Converse Region IV Coach of the Year in 1983; the Basketball News National Coach of the Year in 1983; the Louisiana Coach of the Year in 1983, 1997, 2002, and 2003; the Carol Eckman Award recipient in 1994; and the Women's Basketball Coaches Association (WBCA) Regional Coach of the Year in 1999 and 2003.

In 2000, she was elected to the Women's Basketball Hall of Fame, located in Knoxville, Tennessee. On April 4, 2005, Gunter was elected into the Naismith Memorial Basketball Hall of Fame in Springfield, Massachusetts. She was enshrined posthumously in September 2005.

In 2005, Gunter, along with timber industrialist Roy O. Martin Jr., civil rights pioneer Andrew Young, musician Kix Brooks, and Louisiana State University football legend Paul Dietzel were named a "Louisiana Legend" by Louisiana Public Broadcasting.

Gunter died at her home in Baton Rouge on August 4, 2005, of respiratory problems and emphysema. She was 66.

== See also ==
- List of college women's basketball career coaching wins leaders
