= Pam Borton =

American women's college basketball coach

Biographical details
- Born: August 22, 1965 (age 61)

Coaching career (HC unless noted)
- 1993–1997: Vermont
- 2002–2014: Minnesota

Head coaching record
- Overall: 305–198

Accomplishments and honors

Championships
- 2004 Women's College Basketball Final Four Winningest basketball coach at the University of Minnesota Two-Time Naismith National Coach of the Year Nominee New England National Coach of the Year

Pam Borton (born August 22, 1965) is a former Final Four women's basketball coach, most recently at the University of Minnesota. She took over following the resignation of Brenda Frese in 2002.

As the head coach for the Gophers, she had a record of 236–152 and an overall career record as a head coach of 305–198. She is the winningest head coach in the program history at the University of Minnesota. Previously, Borton was the head coach at the University of Vermont from 1993 to 1997 and was an assistant at Boston College from 1998 to 2002, where she served as associate head coach for her last two seasons.

Borton led Minnesota to its first Final Four appearance in 2004, an elite eight, three straight Sweet 16’s numerous NCAA appearances.

== Head coaching record ==
Record table
Season	Team	Overall	Conference	Standing	Postseason
Vermont (America East Conference) (1993–1997)
1993–94	Vermont	19-11	9-5	3rd	NCAA First Round
1994–95	Vermont	11-16	9-7	5th	
1995–96	Vermont	18-11	13-5	2nd	
1996–97	Vermont	21-8	14-4	T-2nd	
Vermont:		69-46 (.600)	45-21 (.682)		
Minnesota (Big Ten Conference) (2002–present)
2002–03	Minnesota	25-6	12-4	T-2nd	NCAA Sweet 16
2003–04	Minnesota	25-9	9-7	6th	NCAA Final Four
2004–05	Minnesota	26-8	12-4	4th	NCAA Sweet 16
2005–06	Minnesota	19-10	11-5	T-3rd	NCAA First Round
2006–07	Minnesota	17-16	7-9	T-5th	WNIT Second Round
2007–08	Minnesota	20-12	11-7	T-3rd	NCAA First Round
2008–09	Minnesota	20-12	11-7	T-5th	NCAA Second Round
2009–10	Minnesota	13-17	6-12	11th	
2010–11	Minnesota	12-18	4-12	9th	
2011–12	Minnesota	19-17	6-10	8th	WBI Champions
2012–13	Minnesota	18-14	7-9	T-8th	WNIT First Round
2013–14	Minnesota	22-13	8-8	T-6th	WNIT Third Round
Minnesota:		236-152 (.608)	104-94 (.525)		
Total:		305-198 (.606)			
National champion Postseason invitational champion Conference regular season champion Conference regular season and conference tournament champion Division regular season champion Division regular season and conference tournament champion Conference tournament champion
