= 2009 MAC women's basketball tournament =

- Logo for the 2009 Mid-American Conference tournament
- Classification: Division I
- Teams: 12
- Site: Quicken Loans Arena; Cleveland, Ohio
- Champions: Ball State
- Winning coach: Kelly Packard
- MVP: Tracy Pontius (Bowling Green)
- MAC women's basketball tournaments

2008–09 Mid-American Conference women's basketball standings
	Conf.				Overall
Team	W		L	PCT	W		L	PCT
Bowling Green	15	–	1	.938	28	–	4	.875
Kent State	8	–	8	.500	19	–	10	.655
Miami (OH)	7	–	9	.438	16	–	15	.516
Ohio	7	–	9	.438	13	–	18	.419
Akron	6	–	10	.375	11	–	19	.367
Buffalo	2	–	14	.125	8	–	24	.250
West
Ball State †	14	–	2	.875	25	–	8	.758
Toledo	11	–	5	.688	18	–	13	.581
Northern Illinois	10	–	6	.625	15	–	15	.500
Central Michigan	9	–	7	.563	18	–	14	.563
Eastern Michigan	4	–	12	.250	8	–	21	.276
Western Michigan	3	–	13	.188	7	–	23	.233
† 2009 MAC tournament winner Rankings from AP poll

The 2009 Mid-American Conference women's basketball tournament was the post-season basketball tournament for the Mid-American Conference (MAC) 2008–2009 season. The winner of the tournament received the MAC's automatic bid into the 2009 NCAA Division I women's basketball tournament. Regular season west division winner Ball State won the tournament over east division winner Bowling Green. Tracy Pontius was the tournament MVP.

== Format ==
Each of the 12 women's basketball teams in the MAC receive a berth in the conference tournament. Teams are seeded per division by conference record with the following tie-breakers:

- Two-team tie:
1. Head-to-head competition
2. Division record (ten games)
3. Record vs. #1 team in division proceeding through the #6 team, if necessary
4. Non-division record (six games)
5. Record vs. #1 team in the opposite division proceeding through the #6 team, if necessary
6. Coin flip by the Commissioner
- Three-team tie:
1. Total won–lost record of games played among the tied teams
2. Division record (ten games)
3. Record vs. #1 team in division proceeding through the #6 team, if necessary
4. Non-division record (six games)
5. Record vs. #1 team in the opposite division proceeding through the #6 team, if necessary
6. Coin flip by the Commissioner

Note: Once a three-team tie has been reduced to two teams, the two-team tiebreakers go in effect. If there are multiple ties, the ties are broken from the top down (e.g. a tie for #3 will be broken before a tie for #5).

The top two seeds in each division receive byes into the Quarterfinals. All rounds were held at Quicken Loans Arena.

== Bracket ==
First round Wednesday, March 11
4W	Central Michigan	67
5E	Akron	69
3E	Ohio	68
6W	Western Michigan	57
4E	Miami	75
5W	Eastern Michigan	69
3W	Northern Illinois	52
6E	Buffalo	57

Quarterfinals; Friday, March 13
1E	Bowling Green	82
4W	Central Michigan	65
2W	Toledo	77
3E	Ohio	70
1W	Ball State	76
4E	Miami	51
2E	Kent State	54
6E	Buffalo	66

Semifinals; Saturday, March 14
1E	Bowling Green	79
2W	Toledo	66
1W	Ball State	68
6E	Buffalo	54

Final; Sunday, March 15
1E	Bowling Green	51
1W	Ball State	55

== All-Tournament Team ==
Tournament MVP – Tracy Pontius, Bowling Green

Player	Team
Emily Maggert	Ball State
Kourtney Brown	Buffalo
Tanika Mays	Toledo
Niki McCoy	Bowling Green
Tracy Pontius	Bowling Green
