= 2008–09 Mid-American Conference women's basketball season =

- League: NCAA Division I
- Sport: Basketball
- Teams: 12

Regular season
- Champions: Bowling Green
- Runners-up: Ball State
- Season MVP: Lauren Prochaska

Tournament
- Champions: Ball State
- Runners-up: Bowling Green
- Finals MVP: Tracy Pontius

Mid-American women's basketball seasons
- ← 2007–08 2009–10 →

2008–09 Mid-American Conference women's basketball standings
	Conf.				Overall
Team	W		L	PCT	W		L	PCT
Bowling Green	15	–	1	.938	28	–	4	.875
Kent State	8	–	8	.500	19	–	10	.655
Miami (OH)	7	–	9	.438	16	–	15	.516
Ohio	7	–	9	.438	13	–	18	.419
Akron	6	–	10	.375	11	–	19	.367
Buffalo	2	–	14	.125	8	–	24	.250
West
Ball State †	14	–	2	.875	25	–	8	.758
Toledo	11	–	5	.688	18	–	13	.581
Northern Illinois	10	–	6	.625	15	–	15	.500
Central Michigan	9	–	7	.563	18	–	14	.563
Eastern Michigan	4	–	12	.250	8	–	21	.276
Western Michigan	3	–	13	.188	7	–	23	.233
† 2009 MAC tournament winner Rankings from AP poll

The 2008–09 Mid-American Conference women's basketball season began with practices in October 2008, followed by the start of the 2008–09 NCAA Division I women's basketball season in November. Conference play began in January 2009 and concluded in March 2009. Bowling Green won the regular season title with a record of 15–1 by one game over Ball State. Lauren Prochaska of Bowling Green was named MAC player of the year.

West Division winner Ball State won the MAC tournament over Bowling Green. Tracy Pontius of Bowling Green was the tournament MVP. Ball State defeated defending national champion Tennessee in the first round of the NCAA tournament before losing to Iowa State in the second round. Bowling Green reached the third round the WNIT.

== Preseason awards ==
The preseason poll was announced by the league office on October 30, 2008.

=== Preseason women's basketball poll ===
(First place votes in parentheses)

==== East Division ====
1. Bowling Green
2. Miami
3. Kent State
4. Ohio
5. Buffalo
6. Akron

==== West Division ====
1. Ball State
2. Northern Illinois
3. Central Michigan
4. Western Michigan
5. Eastern Michigan
6. Toledo

=== Honors ===
Honor	Recipient
Preseason All-MAC East	Kara Murphy, Akron
Preseason All-MAC East	Lauren Prochaska, Bowling Green
Preseason All-MAC East	Anna Kowalska, Kent State
Preseason All-MAC East	Jenna Schone, Miami
Preseason All-MAC East	Chandra Myers, Ohio
Preseason All-MAC West	Porchia Green, Ball State
Preseason All-MAC West	Emily Maggert, Ball State
Preseason All-MAC West	Britni Houghton, Central Michigan
Preseason All-MAC West	Allie Clifton, Toledo
Preseason All-MAC West	Tiera DeLaHoussaye, Western Michigan

== Postseason ==
=== Postseason awards ===
1. Coach of the Year: Curt Miller, Bowling Green and Tricia Cullop, Toledo
2. Player of the Year: Lauren Prochaska, Bowling Green
3. Freshman of the Year: Brandie Baker, Central Michigan
4. Defensive Player of the Year: Porchia Green, Ball State
5. Sixth Man of the Year: Marke Freeman, Northern Illinois

=== Honors ===
Honor	Recipient
Postseason All-MAC First Team	Lauren Prochaska, Bowling Green
Postseason All-MAC First Team	Tracy Pontius, Bowling Green
Postseason All-MAC First Team	Kara Murphy, Akron
Postseason All-MAC First Team	Porchia Green, Ball State
Postseason All-MAC First Team	Anna Kowalska, Ball State
Postseason All-MAC Second Team	Kourtney Brown, Buffalo
Postseason All-MAC Second Team	Britni Houghton, Central Michigan
Postseason All-MAC Second Team	Jenna Schone, Miami
Postseason All-MAC Second Team	Lauren Hmiel, Ohio
Postseason All-MAC Second Team	Tanika Mays, Toledo
Postseason All-MAC Third Team	Danielle Gratton, Ball State
Postseason All-MAC Third Team	Emily Maggert, Ball State
Postseason All-MAC Third Team	Jessie Wilcox, Northern Illinois
Postseason All-MAC Third Team	Jennifer Bushby, Ohio
Postseason All-MAC Third Team	Tiera DeLaHoussaye, Western Michigan
Postseason All-MAC Honorable Mention	Angel Chan, Central Michigan
Postseason All-MAC Honorable Mention	Cassie Schrock, Eastern Michigan
Postseason All-MAC Honorable Mention	Jamilah Humes, Kent State
Postseason All-MAC Honorable Mention	Ebony Ellis, Northern Illinois
Postseason All-MAC Honorable Mention	Naama Shafir, Toledo
All-MAC Freshman Team	Brandie Baker, Central Michigan
All-MAC Freshman Team	Naama Shafir, Toledo
All-MAC Freshman Team	Kyle Baumgartner, Akron
All-MAC Freshman Team	Tavelyn James, Eastern Michigan
All-MAC Freshman Team	Miame Giden, Western Michigan

== See also ==
2008–09 Mid-American Conference men's basketball season
