= 2007–08 Ohio Bobcats women's basketball team =

Intercollegiate basketball season

2007–08 Ohio Bobcats women's basketball
- Conference: Mid-American Conference
- East Division
- Record: 20–13 (10–6 MAC)
- Head coach: Sylvia Crawley (2nd season)
- Home arena: Convocation Center

2007–08 Mid-American Conference women's basketball standings
	Conf.				Overall
Team	W		L	PCT	W		L	PCT
Bowling Green	13	–	3	.813	25	–	7	.781
Miami (OH)†	12	–	4	.750	23	–	10	.697
Ohio	10	–	6	.625	20	–	13	.606
Buffalo	8	–	8	.500	15	–	15	.500
Kent State	5	–	11	.313	9	–	21	.300
Akron	2	–	14	.125	7	–	24	.226
West
Eastern Michigan	11	–	5	.688	17	–	12	.586
Ball State	11	–	5	.688	15	–	15	.500
Western Michigan	9	–	7	.563	13	–	19	.406
Northern Illinois	6	–	8	.429	10	–	18	.357
Toledo	5	–	10	.333	14	–	16	.467
Central Michigan	2	–	13	.133	6	–	23	.207
† 2008 MAC tournament winner Rankings from AP poll

The 2007–08 Ohio Bobcats women's basketball team represented Ohio University during the 2007–08 NCAA Division I women's basketball season. The Bobcats, led by second year head coach Sylvia Crawley, played their home games at the Convocation Center in Athens, Ohio as a member of the Mid-American Conference. They finished the season 20–13 and 10–6 in MAC play. Ohio reached the MAC Tournament Final. After the season Crawley left to take the head coaching position at Boston College.

== Preseason ==
The preseason poll was announced by the league office on October 18, 2007. Ohio was picked first in the MAC East.

=== Preseason women's basketball poll ===
(First place votes in parentheses)

==== East Division ====
1. Ohio
2. Bowling Green
3. Miami
4. Kent State
5. Buffalo
6. Akron

==== West Division ====
1. Ball State
2. Northern Illinois
3. Eastern Michigan
4. Western Michigan
5. Toledo
6. Central Michigan

=== Preseason All-MAC ===
Preseason All-MAC teams
Team	Player	Position	Year
Preseason All-MAC East	Lauren Kohn		

== Schedule ==
Date time, TV	Rank^{#}	Opponent^{#}	Result	Record	Site (attendance) city, state
Non-conference regular season
Nov 10, 2007*		at Butler	L 58–59	0–1	
Nov 13, 2007*		South Alabama	L 59–73	0–2	
Nov 24, 2007*		Presbyterian	W 85–55	1–2	
Nov 26, 2007*		at Cleveland State	W 70–59	2–2	
Nov 30, 2007*		at vs. Utah Valley	L 81–83	2–3	
Dec 1, 2007*		vs. Hampton	W 70–64	3–3	
Dec 5, 2007*		at Pittsburgh	L 55–69	3–4	
Dec 10, 2007*		at Lehigh	W 67–53	4–4	
Dec 14, 2007*		Marshall	L 74–78	4–5	
Dec 16, 2007*		Robert Morris	W 75–70	5–5	
Dec 21, 2007*		at Michigan	L 64–69	5–6	
Dec 30, 2007*		Morehead State	W 76–54	6–6	
Jan 5, 2008*		at Navy	W 81–52	7–6	
MAC regular season
Jan 9, 2008		Kent State	L 68–74 ^{OT}	7–7 (0–1)	
Jan 12, 2008		at Bowling Green	L 45–60	7–8 (0–2)	
Jan 16, 2008		at Buffalo	W 74–64	8–8 (1–2)	
Jan 19, 2008		Miami (OH)	W 74–55	9–8 (2–2)	
Jan 22, 2008		Akron	W 78–64	10–8 (3–2)	
Jan 26, 2008		at Central Michigan	W 71–64	11–8 (4–2)	
Jan 30, 2008		Ball State	W 88–82 ^{OT}	12–8 (5–2)	
Feb 2, 2008		at Western Michigan	W 94–85	13–8 (6–2)	
Feb 9, 2008		Eastern Michigan	L 56–62	13–9 (6–3)	
Feb 13, 2008		Toledo	W 70–58	14–9 (7–3)	
Feb 20, 2008		at Akron	W 86–58	15–9 (8–3)	
Feb 23, 2008		Buffalo	L 63–67	15–10 (8–4)	
Feb 27, 2008		Bowling Green	L 67–82	15–11 (8–5)	
Mar 1, 2008		at Kent State	W 69–68	16–11 (9–5)	
Mar 3, 2008		at Northern Illinois	W 72–68	17–11 (10–5)	
Mar 5, 2008		at Miami (OH)	L 72–82 ^{OT}	17–12 (10–6)	
MAC Tournament
Mar 9, 2008		Central Michigan	W 68–65	18–12	
Mar 11, 2008		vs. Eastern Michigan	W 76–62	19–12	
Mar 14, 2008		vs. Bowling Green	W 68–66 ^{2OT}	20–12	
Mar 15, 2008		vs. Miami (OH)	L 56–67	20–13	
*Non-conference game. ^{#}Rankings from AP Poll. (#) Tournament seedings in parentheses. All times are in Eastern Time.

== Awards and honors ==
=== All-MAC Awards ===
Postseason All-MAC teams
Team	Player	Position	Year
All-MAC 1st team	Lauren Kohn		
