= 2007–08 Clemson Tigers women's basketball team =

Women's college basketball season

2007–08 Clemson Tigers women's basketball
- Conference: Atlantic Coast Conference
- Record: 12–19 (4–10 ACC)
- Head coach: Cristy McKinney (3rd season)
- Home arena: Littlejohn Coliseum

The 2007–08 Clemson Tigers women's basketball team represented Clemson University during the 2007–08 NCAA Division I women's basketball season. The Tigers were led by third year head coach Cristy McKinney. The Tigers, members of the Atlantic Coast Conference, played their home games at Littlejohn Coliseum.

== Schedule ==
Date time, TV	Rank^{#}	Opponent^{#}	Result	Record	Site city, state
November 9, 2007*		Maine	W 72–59	1–0	Littlejohn Coliseum; Clemson, South Carolina
November 11, 2007*		Western Carolina	L 53–62	1–1	Littlejohn Coliseum; Clemson, South Carolina
November 14, 2007*		Duquesne	W 80–72	2–1	Littlejohn Coliseum; Clemson, South Carolina
November 17, 2007*		at Chattanooga	L 55–65	2–2	McKenzie Arena; Chattanooga, Tennessee
November 20, 2007*		No. 25 Vanderbilt	L 56–74	2–3	Littlejohn Coliseum; Clemson, South Carolina
November 23, 2007*		vs. Rice; Coors Classic	W 62–59	3–3	Coors Events Center; Boulder, Colorado
November 24, 2007*		vs. Siena; Coors Classic	W 77–67	4–3	Coors Events Center; Boulder, Colorado
November 29, 2007*		at No. 20 Michigan State; ACC–Big Ten Women's Challenge	L 51–68	4–4	Breslin Student Events Center; East Lansing, Michigan
December 2, 2007*		at Arkansas	L 63–79	4–5	Bud Walton Arena; Fayetteville, Arkansas
December 5, 2007*		at Furman	W 58–52	5–5	Timmons Arena; Greenville, South Carolina
December 7, 2007*		James Madison	W 69–60	6–5	Littlejohn Coliseum; Clemson, South Carolina
December 16, 2007*		Charleston Southern	W 75–62	7–5	Littlejohn Coliseum; Clemson, South Carolina
December 18, 2007*		at Dayton	L 43–81	7–6	UD Arena; Dayton, Ohio
December 22, 2007*		South Carolina rivalry	L 43–64	7–7	Littlejohn Coliseum; Clemson, South Carolina
January 2, 2008*		at Charlotte	L 58–62	7–8	Dale F. Halton Arena; Charlotte, North Carolina
January 6, 2008		at No. 5 Maryland	L 46–110	7–9 (0–1)	Comcast Center; College Park, Maryland
January 10, 2008		Miami	L 61–66	7–10 (0–2)	Littlejohn Coliseum; Clemson, South Carolina
January 14, 2008		at Wake Forest	W 85–73	8–10 (1–2)	LJVM Coliseum; Winston-Salem, North Carolina
January 17, 2008		at Virginia Tech	W 84–73	9–10 (2–2)	Cassell Coliseum; Blacksburg, Virginia
January 20, 2008		Florida State	L 39–63	9–11 (2–3)	Littlejohn Coliseum; Clemson, South Carolina
January 28, 2008		Boston College	L 63–68	9–12 (2–4)	Littlejohn Coliseum; Clemson, South Carolina
January 31, 2008		at Georgia Tech	L 59–77	9–13 (2–5)	Alexander Memorial Coliseum; Atlanta, Georgia
February 3, 2008		Wake Forest	W 66–46	10–13 (3–5)	Littlejohn Coliseum; Clemson, South Carolina
February 7, 2008		at No. 3 North Carolina	L 47–79	10–14 (3–6)	Carmichael Arena; Chapel Hill, North Carolina
February 13, 2008		No. 12 Duke	L 54–83	10–15 (3–7)	Littlejohn Coliseum; Clemson, South Carolina
February 21, 2008		at Virginia	L 71–83	10–16 (3–8)	John Paul Jones Arena; Charlottesville, Virginia
February 24, 2008		Georgia Tech	L 58–74	10–17 (3–9)	Littlejohn Coliseum; Clemson, South Carolina
February 28, 2008		NC State	L 57–89	10–18 (3–10)	Littlejohn Coliseum; Clemson, South Carolina
March 1, 2008		at Florida State	W 72–70	11–18 (4–10)	Donald L. Tucker Civic Center; Tallahassee, Florida
ACC Tournament
March 6, 2008*		vs. NC State; ACC Tournament first round	W 65–60 ^{OT}	12–18 (4–10)	Greensboro Coliseum; Greensboro, North Carolina
March 7, 2008*		vs. No. 2 North Carolina; ACC Tournament quarterfinal	L 77–97	12–19 (4–10)	Greensboro Coliseum; Greensboro, North Carolina
*Non-conference game. ^{#}Rankings from AP Poll. (#) Tournament seedings in parentheses.
