= 2003–04 Tennessee Lady Volunteers basketball team =

2003–04 Tennessee Lady Volunteers basketball season

2003–04 Tennessee Lady Volunteers basketball

SEC regular season champions

NCAA tournament, Runner-up
- Conference: Southeastern Conference

Ranking
- Coaches: No. 2
- AP: No. 2
- Record: 31–4 (14–0 SEC)
- Head coach: Pat Summitt (30th season)
- Assistant coaches: Mickie DeMoss; Holly Warlick
- Home arena: Thompson–Boling Arena

The 2003–04 Tennessee Lady Volunteers basketball team represented the University of Tennessee as a member of the Southeastern Conference during the 2003–04 women's college basketball season. Coached by Pat Summitt, the Lady Volunteers played their home games at Thompson–Boling Arena in Knoxville, Tennessee. The team won the SEC regular season title, reached the National championship game of the NCAA tournament, and finished the season with a 31–4 record (14–0 SEC).

== Roster ==
2003–04 Tennessee Lady Volunteers women's basketball team
Players
Coaches

Pos.	#	Name	Height	Year	Previous school	Hometown
F	1	Sidney Spencer	6 ft 3 in (1.91 m)	Fr	Hoover	Hoover, AL
G	3	Tasha Butts	5 ft 11 in (1.8 m)	Sr	Baldwin	Milledgeville, GA
G	5	Shanna Zolman	5 ft 10 in (1.78 m)	So	Wawasee	Syracuse, IN
F	13	Dominique Redding	6 ft 1 in (1.85 m)	Fr
G	21	Loree Moore	5 ft 9 in (1.75 m)	Jr		Carson, CA
G/F	25	Brittany Jackson	6 ft 0 in (1.83 m)	Jr		Cleveland, TN
C	33	Ashley Robinson	6 ft 5 in (1.96 m)	Sr	South Grand Prairie	Grand Prairie, Texas
F	43	Shyra Ely	6 ft 2 in (1.88 m)	Jr	Ben Davis	Indianapolis, IN
C	50	Tye'sha Fluker	6 ft 5 in (1.96 m)	So	John Muir	Pasadena, CA

Head coach

- Pat Summitt

Assistant coach(es)

- Mickie DeMoss
- Holly Warlick

Legend

- (C) Team captain
- (S) Suspended
- (I) Ineligible
- (W) Walk-on
- Injured
- Current redshirt

Roster

== Schedule and results ==
Date time, TV	Rank^{#}	Opponent^{#}	Result	Record	Site city, state
Regular season
Nov 23, 2003*	No. 3	Chattanooga	W 83–52	1–0	Thompson–Boling Arena; Knoxville, Tennessee
Nov 30, 2003*	No. 3	No. 17 Notre Dame	W 83–59	2–0	Thompson–Boling Arena; Knoxville, Tennessee
Dec 7, 2003*	No. 3	No. 10 Louisiana Tech	W 85–65	3–0	Thompson–Boling Arena; Knoxville, Tennessee
Dec 11, 2003*	No. 2	Rutgers	W 59–49	4–0	Thompson–Boling Arena; Knoxville, Tennessee
Dec 14, 2003*	No. 2	at No. 6 Stanford	W 70–66 ^{OT}	5–0	Maples Pavilion; Stanford, California
Dec 17, 2003*	No. 2	at DePaul	W 98–89 ^{OT}	6–0	McGrath-Phillips Arena; Chicago, Illinois
Dec 21, 2003*	No. 2	at Oklahoma	W 71–55	7–0	Lloyd Noble Center; Norman, Oklahoma
Dec 28, 2003*	No. 2	No. 5 Texas	L 60–70	7–1	Thompson–Boling Arena; Knoxville, Tennessee
Dec 30, 2003*	No. 5	at George Washington	W 65–51	8–1	Charles E. Smith Center; Washington, D.C.
Jan 2, 2004*	No. 5	at No. 19 TCU	W 74–66	9–1	Daniel–Meyer Coliseum; Fort Worth, Texas
Jan 4, 2004	No. 5	Old Dominion	W 66–42	10–1	Thompson–Boling Arena; Knoxville, Tennessee
Jan 8, 2004	No. 5	Arkansas	W 83–44	11–1 (1–0)	Thompson–Boling Arena; Knoxville, Tennessee
Jan 11, 2004	No. 5	at Mississippi State	W 61–53	12–1 (2–0)	Humphrey Coliseum; Starkville, Mississippi
Jan 15, 2004	No. 5	at South Carolina	W 86–58	13–1 (3–0)	Colonial Center; Columbia, South Carolina
Jan 18, 2004	No. 5	Alabama	W 72–51	14–1 (4–0)	Thompson–Boling Arena; Knoxville, Tennessee
Jan 22, 2004	No. 2	Vanderbilt	W 79–54	15–1 (5–0)	Thompson–Boling Arena; Knoxville, Tennessee
Jan 24, 2004*	No. 2	at No. 1 Duke	W 72–69	16–1	Cameron Indoor Stadium; Durham, North Carolina
Jan 29, 2004	No. 1	at Kentucky	W 81–72	17–1 (6–0)	Rupp Arena; Lexington, Kentucky
Feb 1, 2004	No. 1	Auburn	W 68–61 ^{OT}	18–1 (7–0)	Thompson–Boling Arena; Knoxville, Tennessee
Feb 5, 2004*; 7:00 p.m., ESPN2	No. 1	No. 4 Connecticut	L 67–81	18–2	Thompson–Boling Arena (22,515); Knoxville, Tennessee
Feb 8, 2004	No. 1	South Carolina	W 72–58	19–2 (8–0)	Thompson–Boling Arena; Knoxville, Tennessee
Feb 12, 2004	No. 3	at No. 19 Georgia	W 70–67	20–2 (9–0)	Stegeman Coliseum; Athens, Georgia
Feb 15, 2004	No. 3	at Vanderbilt	W 94–88	21–2 (10–0)	Memorial Gymnasium; Nashville, Tennessee
Feb 19, 2004	No. 3	Florida	W 88–79	22–2 (11–0)	Thompson–Boling Arena; Knoxville, Tennessee
Feb 22, 2004	No. 3	at Ole Miss	W 85–69	23–2 (12–0)	Tad Smith Coliseum; Oxford, Mississippi
Feb 26, 2004	No. 2	at Arkansas	W 93–71	24–2 (13–0)	Bud Walton Arena; Fayetteville, Arkansas
Feb 29, 2004	No. 2	No. 15 LSU	W 85–62	25–2 (14–0)	Thompson–Boling Arena; Knoxville, Tennessee
SEC tournament
Mar 5, 2004*	(1) No. 1	vs. (8) Mississippi State; Quarterfinals	W 67–57	26–2	Gaylord Entertainment Center; Nashville, Tennessee
Mar 6, 2004*	(1) No. 1	vs. (2) No. 20 Georgia; Semifinals	L 66–68 ^{OT}	26–3	Gaylord Entertainment Center; Nashville, Tennessee
NCAA tournament
Mar 20, 2004*	(1 MW) No. 2	(16 MW) Colgate; First round	W 77–54	27–3	Tallahassee-Leon County Civic Center; Tallahassee, Florida
Mar 22, 2004*	(1 MW) No. 2	(8 MW) Florida State; Second round	W 79–59	28–3	Tallahassee-Leon County Civic Center; Tallahassee, Florida
Mar 28, 2004*	(1 MW) No. 2	(4 MW) No. 15 Baylor; Regional Semifinal – Sweet Sixteen	W 71–69	29–3	Lloyd Noble Center; Norman, Oklahoma
Mar 30, 2004*	(1 MW) No. 2	(6 MW) No. 10 Stanford; Regional Final – Elite Eight	W 62–60	30–3	Lloyd Noble Center; Norman, Oklahoma
Apr 4, 2004*; ESPN	(1 MW) No. 2	vs. (4 W) No. 19 LSU; National Semifinal – Final Four	W 52–50	31–3	New Orleans Arena; New Orleans, Louisiana
Apr 6, 2004*; 8:30 p.m., ESPN	(1 MW) No. 2	vs. (2 E) No. 6 Connecticut; National Championship	L 61–70	31–4	New Orleans Arena; New Orleans, Louisiana
*Non-conference game. ^{#}Rankings from AP Poll. (#) Tournament seedings in parentheses. MW=Midwest.

== Rankings ==
Ranking movements Legend: ██ Increase in ranking ██ Decrease in ranking
	Week																			
Poll	Pre	1	2	3	4	5	6	7	8	9	10	11	12	13	14	15	16	17	18	Final
AP	4	3	3	3	2	2	2	5	5	5	2	1	1	3	3	2	1	5	2	Not released
Coaches	2	2	5	5	5	4	5	5	5	5	4	4	3	3	3	3	3	4	4	2
