= 2008 MAC women's basketball tournament =

- Classification: Division I
- Teams: 12
- Site: Quicken Loans Arena; Cleveland, Ohio
- Champions: Miami
- Winning coach: Maria Fantanarosa
- MVP: Amanda Jackson (Miami)
- MAC women's basketball tournaments

2007–08 Mid-American Conference women's basketball standings
	Conf.				Overall
Team	W		L	PCT	W		L	PCT
Bowling Green	13	–	3	.813	25	–	7	.781
Miami (OH)†	12	–	4	.750	23	–	10	.697
Ohio	10	–	6	.625	20	–	13	.606
Buffalo	8	–	8	.500	15	–	15	.500
Kent State	5	–	11	.313	9	–	21	.300
Akron	2	–	14	.125	7	–	24	.226
West
Eastern Michigan	11	–	5	.688	17	–	12	.586
Ball State	11	–	5	.688	15	–	15	.500
Western Michigan	9	–	7	.563	13	–	19	.406
Northern Illinois	6	–	8	.429	10	–	18	.357
Toledo	5	–	10	.333	14	–	16	.467
Central Michigan	2	–	13	.133	6	–	23	.207
† 2008 MAC tournament winner Rankings from AP poll

The 2008 Mid-American Conference women's basketball tournament was the post-season basketball tournament for the Mid-American Conference (MAC) 2007–08 college basketball season. The 2008 tournament was held March 9–15, 2008. Miami won the championship over Ohio. Amanda Jackson of Miami was the MVP.

== Format ==
The top two seeds in each division received byes into the quarterfinals. All rounds were held at Quicken Loans Arena.

== Bracket ==
First round Sunday, March 9; Monday March 10
4W	Northern Illinois	67
5E	Kent State	75
3E	Ohio	68
6W	Central Michigan	65
4E	Buffalo	50
5W	Toledo	53
3W	Western Michigan	84
6E	Akron	54

Quarterfinals; Tuesday, March 11
1E	Bowling Green	85
5E	Kent State	57
2W	Eastern Michigan	62
3E	Ohio	76
1W	Ball State	60
5W	Toledo	65
2E	Miami	65
3W	Western Michigan	60

Semifinals; Friday, March 14
1E	Bowling Green	66
3E	Ohio	68
5W	Toledo	66
2E	Miami	70

Final; Saturday, March 15
3E	Ohio	56
2E	Miami	67

== All-Tournament Team ==
Tournament MVP – Amanda Jackson, Miami

Player	Team
Amanda Jackson	Miami
Laura Markwood	Miami
Lauren Hmiel	Ohio
Jennifer Poff	Ohio
Ta' Yani Clark	Toledo
Tara Breske	Bowling Green
