= 2006–07 Clemson Tigers women's basketball team =

Women's college basketball season

2006–07 Clemson Tigers women's basketball
- Conference: Atlantic Coast Conference
- Record: 12–18 (4–10 ACC)
- Head coach: Cristy McKinney (2nd season)
- Home arena: Littlejohn Coliseum

The 2006–07 Clemson Tigers women's basketball team represented Clemson University during the 2006–07 NCAA Division I women's basketball season. The Tigers were led by second year head coach Cristy McKinney. The Tigers, members of the Atlantic Coast Conference, played their home games at Littlejohn Coliseum.

== Schedule ==
Date time, TV	Rank^{#}	Opponent^{#}	Result	Record	Site city, state
November 11, 2006*		Arkansas	L 69–75	0–1	Littlejohn Coliseum; Clemson, South Carolina
November 13, 2006*		College of Charleston	W 64–42	1–1	Littlejohn Coliseum; Clemson, South Carolina
November 16, 2006*		Chattanooga	L 64–73	1–2	Littlejohn Coliseum; Clemson, South Carolina
November 20, 2006*		at South Carolina rivalry	L 48–80	1–3	Colonial Life Arena; Columbia, South Carolina
November 24, 2006*		vs. St. John’s; Dead River Company Classic	W 95–88	2–3	Alfond Arena; Orono, Maine
November 25, 2006*		at Maine; Dead River Company Classic	L 78–80	2–4	Alfond Arena; Orono, Maine
November 29, 2006*		Furman	W 67–62	3–4	Littlejohn Coliseum; Clemson, South Carolina
December 3, 2006*		at No. 12 Vanderbilt	L 63–82	3–5	Memorial Gymnasium; Nashville, Tennessee
December 6, 2006*		at James Madison	L 72–85	3–6	JMU Convocation Center; Harrisonburg, Virginia
December 10, 2006*		Kennesaw State	W 71–62	4–6	Littlejohn Coliseum; Clemson, South Carolina
December 17, 2006*		at Tennessee Tech	W 70–67	5–6	Eblen Center; Cookeville, Tennessee
December 19, 2006*		Dayton	W 77–69	6–6	Littlejohn Coliseum; Clemson, South Carolina
December 22, 2006*		Wofford	W 94–81	7–6	Littlejohn Coliseum; Clemson, South Carolina
December 29, 2006*		at Duquesne	W 77–74	8–6	A. J. Palumbo Center; Pittsburgh, Pennsylvania
January 2, 2007*		Charlotte	L 62–65	8–7	Littlejohn Coliseum; Clemson, South Carolina
January 5, 2007		at Wake Forest	W 73–57	9–7 (1–0)	LJVM Coliseum; Winston-Salem, North Carolina
January 7, 2007		Georgia Tech	L 57–63	9–8 (1–1)	Littlejohn Coliseum; Clemson, South Carolina
January 11, 2007		No. 2 North Carolina	L 65–100	9–9 (1–2)	Littlejohn Coliseum; Clemson, South Carolina
January 18, 2007		Florida State	L 60–61	9–10 (1–3)	Littlejohn Coliseum; Clemson, South Carolina
January 21, 2007		at Boston College	L 64–69	9–11 (1–4)	Conte Forum; Chestnut Hill, Massachusetts
January 25, 2007		No. 3 Maryland	L 62–76	9–12 (1–5)	Littlejohn Coliseum; Clemson, South Carolina
January 28, 2007		at Miami	W 79–69	10–12 (2–5)	BankUnited Center; Miami, Florida
February 5, 2007		at No. 1 Duke	L 53–105	10–13 (2–6)	Cameron Indoor Stadium; Durham, North Carolina
February 8, 2007		at NC State	L 52–65	10–14 (2–7)	Reynolds Coliseum; Raleigh, North Carolina
February 11, 2007		Virginia Tech	W 73–69	11–14 (3–7)	Littlejohn Coliseum; Clemson, South Carolina
February 15, 2007		Wake Forest	W 76–53	12–14 (4–7)	Littlejohn Coliseum; Clemson, South Carolina
February 19, 2007		at Georgia Tech	L 59–62	12–15 (4–8)	Alexander Memorial Coliseum; Atlanta, Georgia
February 22, 2007		at Florida State	L 61–73	12–16 (4–9)	Donald L. Tucker Civic Center; Tallahassee, Florida
February 25, 2007		Virginia	L 85–86	12–17 (4–10)	Littlejohn Coliseum; Clemson, South Carolina
ACC Tournament
March 1, 2007*		vs. Virginia; ACC Tournament first round	L 82–89	12–18 (4–10)	Greensboro Coliseum; Greensboro, North Carolina
*Non-conference game. ^{#}Rankings from AP Poll. (#) Tournament seedings in parentheses.
