= 2008–09 Clemson Tigers women's basketball team =

Women's college basketball season

2008–09 Clemson Tigers women's basketball
- Conference: Atlantic Coast Conference
- Record: 14–17 (2–12 ACC)
- Head coach: Cristy McKinney (4th season)
- Home arena: Littlejohn Coliseum

The 2008–09 Clemson Tigers women's basketball team represented Clemson University during the 2008–09 NCAA Division I women's basketball season. The Tigers were led by fourth year head coach Cristy McKinney. The Tigers, members of the Atlantic Coast Conference, played their home games at Littlejohn Coliseum.

== Schedule ==
Date time, TV	Rank^{#}	Opponent^{#}	Result	Record	Site city, state
November 14, 2008*		at Furman	L 68–82	0–1	Timmons Arena; Greenville, South Carolina
November 16, 2008*		Presbyterian	W 66–35	1–1	Littlejohn Coliseum; Clemson, South Carolina
November 19, 2008*		at South Carolina rivalry	W 52–45	2–1	Colonial Life Arena; Columbia, South Carolina
November 22, 2008*		Georgia State	L 75–82	2–2	Littlejohn Coliseum; Clemson, South Carolina
November 25, 2008*		Winthrop	W 76–68	3–2	Littlejohn Coliseum; Clemson, South Carolina
November 28, 2008*		vs. Kent State; Washington Husky Classic	W 68–53	4–2	Hec Edmundson Pavilion; Seattle, Washington
November 30, 2008*		at Washington; Washington Husky Classic	W 85–67	5–2	Hec Edmundson Pavilion; Seattle, Washington
December 4, 2008*		at Northwestern; ACC–Big Ten Women's Challenge	W 78–75 ^{OT}	6–2	Welsh–Ryan Arena; Evanston, Illinois
December 6, 2008*		Ohio	W 60–57	7–2	Littlejohn Coliseum; Clemson, South Carolina
December 15, 2008*		Chattanooga	W 79–74	8–2	Littlejohn Coliseum; Clemson, South Carolina
December 22, 2008*		vs. Georgia	W 67–50	8–3	Arena at Gwinnett Center; Duluth, Georgia
December 29, 2008*		Kennesaw State	W 78–65	9–3	Littlejohn Coliseum; Clemson, South Carolina
January 2, 2009*		Charlotte	L 51–58	9–4	Littlejohn Coliseum; Clemson, South Carolina
January 5, 2009		at Miami (FL)	W 74–68	10–4 (1–0)	BankUnited Center; Miami, Florida
January 8, 2009		No. 2 North Carolina	L 74–83	10–5 (1–1)	Littlejohn Coliseum; Clemson, South Carolina
January 11, 2009		at Florida State	L 54–80	10–6 (1–2)	Donald L. Tucker Civic Center; Tallahassee, Florida
January 15, 2009		No. 12 Maryland	L 56–65	10–7 (1–3)	Littlejohn Coliseum; Clemson, South Carolina
January 18, 2009		at Wake Forest	W 64–60	11–7 (2–3)	LJVM Coliseum; Winston-Salem, North Carolina
January 20, 2009*		Charleston Southern	W 85–60	12–7 (2–3)	Littlejohn Coliseum; Clemson, South Carolina
January 23, 2009		at Boston College	L 51–71	12–8 (2–4)	Conte Forum; Chestnut Hill, Massachusetts
January 26, 2009		No. 14 Virginia	L 67–75	12–9 (2–5)	Littlejohn Coliseum; Clemson, South Carolina
January 28, 2009		Virginia Tech	L 61–65	12–10 (2–6)	Littlejohn Coliseum; Clemson, South Carolina
February 1, 2009		at Georgia Tech	L 41–49	12–11 (2–7)	Alexander Memorial Coliseum; Atlanta, Georgia
February 4, 2009*		at Western Carolina	W 73–64	13–11 (2–7)	Ramsey Center; Cullowhee, North Carolina
February 8, 2009		Wake Forest	L 66–71	13–12 (2–8)	Littlejohn Coliseum; Clemson, South Carolina
February 13, 2009		at No. 4 Duke	L 53–77	13–13 (2–9)	Cameron Indoor Stadium; Durham, North Carolina
February 19, 2009		No. 11 Florida State	L 58–75	13–14 (2–10)	Littlejohn Coliseum; Clemson, South Carolina
February 22, 2009		Georgia Tech	L 54–89	13–15 (2–11)	Littlejohn Coliseum; Clemson, South Carolina
February 26, 2009		at NC State	L 43–69	13–16 (2–12)	Reynolds Coliseum; Raleigh, North Carolina
ACC Tournament
March 5, 2009*		vs. Georgia Tech; ACC Tournament first round	W 81–69	14–16 (2–12)	Greensboro Coliseum; Greensboro, North Carolina
March 6, 2009*		vs. No. 11 North Carolina; ACC Tournament quarterfinal	L 55–74	14–17 (2–12)	Greensboro Coliseum; Greensboro, North Carolina
*Non-conference game. ^{#}Rankings from AP Poll. (#) Tournament seedings in parentheses.
