= Cristy McKinney =

American basketball coach

Cristy McKinney (née Earnhardt, born July 13, 1957) is an American former women's basketball coach. She found most success as the head coach at Rice University from 1993 to 2005, posting a 216–138 record and winning two Western Athletic Conference Tournament championships. She also led the Owls to four Women's National Invitation Tournaments and two NCAA Tournaments. McKinney was inducted into Rice's Athletic Hall of Fame in 2013, and she remains the school's winningest coach.

McKinney played college basketball at NC State in the late 1970s under Hall of Famer Kay Yow, where she stills holds the freshman scoring record. Besides Rice, she was also the head coach at the University of Montevallo from 1984 to 1986, and at Clemson University from 2005 to 2010. At Clemson, her last head coaching job, she posted a record of 59–93 before resigning. She also served for years as an assistant coach at Western Kentucky University and at Elon University. In May 2018, McKinney announced her retirement from coaching after 36 years.

== Coaching career ==
=== Western Kentucky (first stint) ===
For her first coaching job, McKinney was hired as an assistant at Western Kentucky University in 1982. She would stay there initially for two years, until 1984.

=== Montevallo ===
For her first head coaching job, McKinney served as the head coach for two years at NAIA school Montevallo from 1984 to 1986. Over those two years, she posted a record of 27–28. She helped the Lady Eagles to a seven-win improvement and earned District Coach of the Year honors her second season.

=== Western Kentucky (second stint) ===
McKinney returned to serve as an assistant at Western Kentucky from 1986 to 1993. During that seven-year span, she helped Western Kentucky to a 169–47 record, seven NCAA appearances, three straight Sweet 16 appearances, and a Final Four appearance in 1992.

=== Rice ===
McKinney was next hired as the head coach at Rice University in 1993, where she would stay for the next twelve years. In 2000, Rice won its first ever conference championship and made its first ever NCAA tournament appearance, making it to the second round after upsetting 4th-seeded UCSB in the first round. In 2001, Rice posted a win over No. 6 Louisiana Tech, which remains the highest ranked opponent Rice has ever beaten. In 2005, her final season at the school, Rice won the WAC regular season and tournament championships, completed a 24–9 season, made its second ever NCAA tournament appearance, and McKinney was named WAC Coach of the Year.

=== Clemson ===
On April 18, 2005, McKinney was announced as the new head coach at Clemson University.

On March 10, 2010, McKinney resigned as head coach at Clemson, finishing with a 59–93 record.

=== Elon ===
On July 25, 2011, McKinney was hired as an assistant coach at Elon University, under new head coach Charlotte Smith. It would prove to be her last coaching job. In her seven seasons at Elon, McKinney helped the Phoenix to a 139–85 record, two CAA Tournament championships, and two NCAA Tournament appearances.

In May 2018, McKinney announced her retirement from coaching after 36 years.

== Personal life ==
McKinney earned a bachelor's degree in math education at NC State in 1979, and a master's degree in physical education at Western Carolina in 1982.

She was married to Robert McKinney for 25 years, before Robert died in September 2011.

== Head coaching record ==
=== College ===
Statistics overview
| Season | Team | Overall | Conference | Standing | Postseason |
|---|---|---|---|---|---|
Montevallo Falcons (NAIA Independent) (1984–1986)
| 1984–85 | Montevallo | 10–16 | | | |
| 1985–86 | Montevallo | 17–12 | | | |
| Montevallo: | | 27–28 (.491) | | | |
Rice Owls (Southwest Conference) (1993–1996)
| 1993–94 | Rice | 13–14 | 5–9 | 5th | |
| 1994–95 | Rice | 11–16 | 7–7 | 4th | |
| 1995–96 | Rice | 13–14 | 6–8 | 5th | |
Rice Owls (Western Athletic Conference) (1996–2005)
| 1996–97 | Rice | 16–11 | 11–5 | 5th | |
| 1997–98 | Rice | 21–9 | 11–3 | 2nd | WNIT Round 1 |
| 1998–99 | Rice | 20–12 | 9–5 | 5th | WNIT Round 3 |
| 1999–00 | Rice | 22–10 | 10–4 | 3rd | NCAA Division I Round of 32 |
| 2000–01 | Rice | 18–12 | 9–7 | 4th | |
| 2001–02 | Rice | 21–9 | 14–4 | 2nd | WNIT Round 1 |
| 2002–03 | Rice | 15–12 | 12–6 | 2nd | |
| 2003–04 | Rice | 22–10 | 16–2 | 2nd | WNIT Round 2 |
| 2004–05 | Rice | 24–9 | 14–4 | 1st | NCAA Division I Round of 64 |
| Rice: | | 216–138 (.610) | | | |
Clemson Tigers (Atlantic Coast Conference) (2005–2010)
| 2005–06 | Clemson | 8–21 | 2–12 | 11th | |
| 2006–07 | Clemson | 12–18 | 4–10 | 9th | |
| 2007–08 | Clemson | 12–19 | 4–10 | 9th | |
| 2008–09 | Clemson | 14–17 | 2–12 | 10th | |
| 2009–10 | Clemson | 13–18 | 4–10 | 10th | |
| Clemson: | | 59–93 (.388) | | | |
| Total: | | 302–260 (.537) | | | |
National champion Postseason invitational champion Conference regular season champion Conference regular season and conference tournament champion Division regular season champion Division regular season and conference tournament champion Conference tournament champion
