= 2003–04 Connecticut Huskies women's basketball team =

Intercollegiate basketball season

2003–04 Connecticut Huskies women's basketball

NCAA tournament National Champions Big East regular season champions
- Conference: Big East Conference

Ranking
- Coaches: No. 1
- AP: No. 3
- Record: 31–4 (14–2 Big East)
- Head coach: Geno Auriemma (19th season)
- Associate head coach: Chris Dailey
- Assistant coaches: Tonya Cardoza; Jamelle Elliott
- Home arena: Harry A. Gampel Pavilion

2003–04 Big East Conference women's basketball standings
	Conf.				Overall
Team	W		L	PCT	W		L	PCT
No. 6 Connecticut	14	–	2	.875	31	–	4	.886
No. 25 Villanova	12	–	4	.750	23	–	7	.767
Notre Dame	12	–	4	.750	21	–	11	.656
No. 18 Boston College †	11	–	5	.688	27	–	7	.794
Miami (FL)	11	–	5	.688	22	–	7	.759
Virginia Tech	10	–	6	.625	23	–	8	.742
West Virginia	10	–	6	.625	21	–	11	.656
Rutgers	10	–	6	.625	21	–	12	.636
Georgetown	7	–	9	.438	13	–	15	.464
Seton Hall	6	–	10	.375	15	–	15	.500
St. John's	4	–	12	.250	10	–	18	.357
Syracuse	3	–	13	.188	6	–	21	.222
Pittsburgh	2	–	14	.125	6	–	20	.231
Providence	0	–	16	.000	4	–	23	.148
† 2004 Big East Tournament winner As of April 7, 2004; Rankings from AP poll

The 2003–04 Connecticut Huskies women's basketball team represented the University of Connecticut in the 2003–2004 NCAA Division I basketball season. Coached by Geno Auriemma, the Huskies played their home games at the Hartford Civic Center in Hartford, Connecticut, and on campus at the Harry A. Gampel Pavilion in Storrs, Connecticut, and are a member of the Big East Conference. The Huskies won their fifth NCAA championship, and third consecutive, by defeating the Tennessee Lady Vols, 70–61.

== Roster ==
2003–04 Connecticut Huskies women's basketball team
Players
Coaches

Pos.	#	Name	Height	Year	Previous school	Hometown
G	2	Ashley Valley	5 ft 9 in (1.75 m)	Jr	Rice Memorial	Colchester, Vermont
G/F	3	Diana Taurasi (C)	6 ft 0 in (1.83 m)	Sr	Don Lugo	Chino, California
G	5	Maria Conlon	5 ft 9 in (1.75 m)	Sr	Seymour	Derby, Connecticut
G	12	Stacey Marron	5 ft 9 in (1.75 m)	Jr	La Cueva	Albuquerque, New Mexico
G	20	Morgan Valley	6 ft 0 in (1.83 m)	Sr	Rice Memorial	Colchester, Vermont
G	21	Nicole Wolff	6 ft 0 in (1.83 m)	So	Walpole	Walpole, Massachusetts
F	22	Ashley Battle	6 ft 0 in (1.83 m)	RS Jr	The Linsly School	Pittsburgh, Pennsylvania
F/C	23	Willnett Crockett	6 ft 2 in (1.88 m)	So	Narbonne	Harbor City, California
C	31	Jessica Moore (C)	6 ft 3 in (1.91 m)	RS Jr	Colony	Palmer, AK
G/F	33	Barbara Turner	6 ft 0 in (1.83 m)	So	East Technical	Cleveland, Ohio
G	43	Ann Strother	6 ft 2 in (1.88 m)	So	Highlands Ranch	Castle Rock, Colorado

Head coach

Geno Auriemma

Assistant coach(es)

Chris Dailey
Tonya Cardoza
Jamelle Elliott

Legend

- (C) Team captain
- (S) Suspended
- (I) Ineligible
- (W) Walk-on
- Injured
- Current redshirt

Roster
Last update: 2013-08-23

== Schedule and results ==
Date time, TV	Rank^{#}	Opponent^{#}	Result	Record	Site city, state
Non-Conference Regular Season
November 23, 2003*; 2:00 pm, CPTV	No. 1	Western Michigan	W 95–46	1–0	Gampel Pavilion (10,167); Storrs, Connecticut
November 25, 2003*; 7:00 pm, CPTV	No. 1	Florida State	W 81–53	2–0	Hartford Civic Center (16,294); Hartford, Connecticut
November 30, 2003*; 2:00 pm, CPTV	No. 1	Holy Cross	W 76–42	3–0	Hartford Civic Center (16,294); Hartford, Connecticut
December 02, 2003*; 7:30 pm, CPTV	No. 1	Siena	W 69–45	4–0	Gampel Pavilion (10,167); Storrs, Connecticut
December 05, 2003*; 8:00 pm, CPTV	No. 1	at Pepperdine	W 84–53	5–0	Firestone Fieldhouse (3,121); Malibu, California
December 07, 2003*; 2:00 pm, CPTV	No. 1	at USC	W 72–69	6–0	Los Angeles Memorial Sports Arena (6,172); Los Angeles, California
December 18, 2003*; 7:00 pm, CPTV	No. 1	Arizona State	W 81–55	7–0	Hartford Civic Center (16,294); Hartford, Connecticut
December 21, 2003*; 12:05 pm, CPTV	No. 1	at St. Joseph's	W 87–34	8–0	Alumni Memorial Fieldhouse (6,143); Philadelphia, Pennsylvania
December 29, 2003*; 7:00 pm, CPTV	No. 1	NC State	W 87–53	9–0	Hartford Civic Center (16,294); Hartford, Connecticut
January 03, 2004*; 2:00 pm, CBS	No. 1	No. 4 Duke	L 67–68	9–1	Hartford Civic Center (16.294); Hartford, Connecticut
Big East Regular Season
January 07, 2004; 7:00 pm, CPTV	No. 4	at West Virginia	W 82–57	10–1 (1–0)	WVU Coliseum (2,604); Morgantown, West Virginia
January 10, 2004; 12:00 pm, CPTV	No. 4	Georgetown	W 69–51	11–1 (2–0)	Gampel Pavilion (10,167); Storrs, Connecticut
January 13, 2004; 7:00 pm, CPTV	No. 4	at Notre Dame	L 51–66	11–2 (2–1)	Joyce Center (8,574); South Bend, Indiana
January 17, 2004; 12:00 pm, CPTV	No. 4	No. 22 Boston College	W 69–61	12–2 (3–1)	Hartford Civic Center (16,294); Hartford, Connecticut
January 19, 2004; 2:00 pm, ESPN2	No. 5	Rutgers	W 72–47	13–2 (4–1)	Hartford Civic Center (16,294); Hartford, Connecticut
January 24, 2004; 3:00 pm, YES	No. 5	at Seton Hall	W 71–63	14–2 (5–1)	Walsh Gymnasium (2,600); South Orange, New Jersey
January 27, 2004; 7:00 pm, CPTV	No. 4	at No. 23 Virginia Tech	W 68–50	15–2 (6–1)	Cassell Coliseum (7,211); Blacksburg, Virginia
January 31, 2004; 12:00 pm, CPTV	No. 4	St. John's	W 82–49	16–2 (7–1)	Gampel Pavilion (10,167); Storrs, Connecticut
February 05, 2004*; 7:00 pm, ESPN2	No. 4	at No. 1 Tennessee	W 81–67	17–2	Thompson–Boling Arena (22,515); Knoxville, Tennessee
February 08, 2004; 2:00 pm, CPTV	No. 4	No. 22 Miami (FL)	W 83–65	18–2 (8–1)	Gampel Pavilion (10,167); Storrs, Connecticut
February 11, 2004; 7:00 pm, CPTV	No. 2	at Syracuse	W 82–38	19–2 (9–1)	Manley Field House (3,442); Syracuse, New York
February 14, 2004; 7:00 pm, MSG/FSNE	No. 2	at Rutgers	W 66–43	20–2 (10–1)	Louis Brown Athletic Center (7,734); New Brunswick, New Jersey
February 17, 2004; 7:00 pm, CPTV	No. 2	Pittsburgh	W 97–42	21–2 (11–1)	Hartford Civic Center (16,294); Hartford, Connecticut
February 21, 2004; 12:00 pm, NESN	No. 2	at No. 23 Boston College	W 81–60	22–2 (12–1)	Conte Forum (8,606); Chestnut Hill, Massachusetts
February 25, 2004; 7:30 pm, CPTV	No. 1	Providence	W 79–38	23–2 (13–1)	Gampel Pavilion (10,167); Storrs, Connecticut
February 28, 2004; 8:05 pm, CPTV	No. 1	at Villanova	L 56–59	23–3 (13–2)	Finneran Pavilion (6,500); Villanova, Pennsylvania
March 02, 2004; 7:30 pm, CPTV	No. 4	West Virginia	W 100–72	24–3 (14–2)	Gampel Pavilion (10,167); Storrs, Connecticut
Big East Tournament
March 07, 2004*; 2:00 pm, CPTV	(1) No. 4	(8) Virginia Tech; Quarterfinals	W 48–34	25–3	Hartford Civic Center (10,833); Hartford, Connecticut
March 08, 2004*; 6:00 pm, ESPN2	(1) No. 3	(5) No. 23 Boston College; Semifinals	L 70–73	25–4	Hartford Civic Center (–); Hartford, Connecticut
NCAA Tournament
March 21, 2004*; 9:20 pm, ESPN2	(2 E) No. 3	vs. (15 E) Penn; First Round	W 91–55	26–4	The Arena at Harbor Yard (9,091); Bridgeport, Connecticut
March 23, 2004*; 9:00 pm, ESPN2	(2 E) No. 3	vs. (7 E) No. 22 Auburn; Second Round	W 79–53	27–4	The Arena at Harbor Yard (9,091); Bridgeport, Connecticut
March 27, 2004*; 2:30 pm, ESPN	(2 E) No. 3	(11 E) UC Santa Barbara; Sweet Sixteen	W 63–55	28–4	Hartford Civic Center (14,253); Hartford, Connecticut
March 29, 2004*; 7:00 pm, ESPN	(2 E) No. 3	(1 E) No. 5 Penn State; Elite Eight	W 66–49	29–4	Hartford Civic Center (14,855); Hartford, Connecticut
April 04, 2004*; 9:33 pm, ESPN	(2 E) No. 3	vs. (7 ME) No. 24 Minnesota; Final Four	W 67–58	30–4	New Orleans Arena (18,211); New Orleans, Louisiana
April 06, 2004*; 8:39 pm, ESPN	(2 E) No. 3	vs. (1 MW) No. 2 Tennessee; National Championship Game	W 70–61	31–4	New Orleans Arena (18,211); New Orleans
*Non-conference game. ^{#}Rankings from AP Poll. (#) Tournament seedings in parentheses. All times are in Eastern Time. E = East, ME = Mid-East, MW = Mid-West.

== Rankings ==
Ranking movements Legend: ██ Increase in ranking ██ Decrease in ranking
	Week																			
Poll	Pre	1	2	3	4	5	6	7	8	9	10	11	12	13	14	15	16	17	18	Final
AP	1	1	1	1	1	1	1	1	4	4	5	4	4	2	2	1	4	3	6	Not released
Coaches	5	5	4	2	2	2	2	2	2	2	2	2	1	1	1	1	1	1	2	1

== Awards and honors ==
- Diana Taurasi, Big East Conference Women's Basketball Player of the Year
- Diana Taurasi, Tournament Most Outstanding Player
- Diana Taurasi, Naismith Award

== Huskies of Honor induction ==
On December 29, 2013, the University of Connecticut inducted two women's basketball team, the National Championship winning teams of 2002–03 and 2003–04 into the Huskies of Honor.

== Team players drafted into the WNBA ==
Round	Pick	Player	NBA club
1	1	Diana Taurasi	Phoenix Mercury
