= 2008–09 Ohio Bobcats women's basketball team =

Intercollegiate basketball season

2008–09 Ohio Bobcats women's basketball
- Conference: Mid-American Conference
- East Division
- Record: 13–18 (7–9 MAC)
- Head coach: Semeka Randall (1st season)
- Home arena: Convocation Center

2008–09 Mid-American Conference women's basketball standings
| | Conf. | | | | Overall |
| Team | W | | L | PCT | W | | L | PCT |
|---|---|---|---|---|---|---|---|---|
| Bowling Green | 15 | – | 1 | .938 | 28 | – | 4 | .875 |
| Kent State | 8 | – | 8 | .500 | 19 | – | 10 | .655 |
| Miami (OH) | 7 | – | 9 | .438 | 16 | – | 15 | .516 |
| Ohio | 7 | – | 9 | .438 | 13 | – | 18 | .419 |
| Akron | 6 | – | 10 | .375 | 11 | – | 19 | .367 |
| Buffalo | 2 | – | 14 | .125 | 8 | – | 24 | .250 |
West
| Ball State † | 14 | – | 2 | .875 | 25 | – | 8 | .758 |
| Toledo | 11 | – | 5 | .688 | 18 | – | 13 | .581 |
| Northern Illinois | 10 | – | 6 | .625 | 15 | – | 15 | .500 |
| Central Michigan | 9 | – | 7 | .563 | 18 | – | 14 | .563 |
| Eastern Michigan | 4 | – | 12 | .250 | 8 | – | 21 | .276 |
| Western Michigan | 3 | – | 13 | .188 | 7 | – | 23 | .233 |
† 2009 MAC tournament winner Rankings from AP poll

The 2008–09 Ohio Bobcats women's basketball team represented Ohio University during the 2008–09 NCAA Division I women's basketball season. The Bobcats, led by first year head coach Semeka Randall, played their home games at the Convocation Center in Athens, Ohio as a member of the Mid-American Conference. They finished the season 13–18 and 7–9 in MAC play.

== Preseason ==
The preseason poll was announced by the league office on October 30, 2008. Ohio was picked fourth in the MAC East

=== Preseason women's basketball poll ===
(First place votes in parentheses)

==== East Division ====
1. Bowling Green
2. Miami
3. Kent State
4. Ohio
5. Buffalo
6. Akron

==== West Division ====
1. Ball State
2. Northern Illinois
3. Central Michigan
4. Western Michigan
5. Eastern Michigan
6. Toledo

=== Preseason All-MAC ===
Preseason All-MAC teams
| Team | Player | Position | Year |
|---|---|---|---|
| Preseason All-MAC East | Chandra Myers | | |

== Schedule ==
| Date time, TV | Rank^{#} | Opponent^{#} | Result | Record | Site (attendance) city, state |
Non-conference regular season
| Nov 14, 2008* | | at Navy | W 63–48 | 1–0 | |
| Nov 16, 2008* | | at Morehead State | L 52–56 | 1–1 | |
| Nov 24, 2008* | | at Memphis | L 69–72 | 1–2 | |
| Nov 28, 2008* | | vs. South Carolina | L 34–43 | 1–3 | |
| Nov 29, 2008* | | vs. Fordham | L 51–55 | 1–4 | |
| Dec 4, 2008* | | at Presbyterian | W 68–37 | 2–4 | |
| Dec 6, 2008* | | at Clemson | L 57–60 | 2–5 | |
| Dec 13, 2008* | | at Marshall | W 67–53 | 3–5 | |
| Dec 19, 2008* | | Cleveland State | W 76–66 | 4–5 | |
| Dec 21, 2008* | | at Syracuse | L 62–67 | 4–6 | |
| Dec 29, 2008* | | at South Alabama | L 64–68 | 4–7 | |
| Jan 3, 2009* | | No. 18 Florida | L 56–74 | 4–8 | |
MAC regular season
| Jan 7, 2009 | | at Buffalo | W 84–81 ^{OT} | 5–8 (1–0) | |
| Jan 10, 2009 | | Bowling Green | L 52–62 | 5–9 (1–1) | |
| Jan 14, 2009 | | Akron | W 65–60 ^{OT} | 6–9 (2–1) | |
| Jan 17, 2009 | | at Kent State | L 74–78 ^{OT} | 6–10 (2–2) | |
| Jan 21, 2009 | | at Miami (OH) | W 66–53 | 7–10 (3–2) | |
| Jan 24, 2009 | | Northern Illinois | L 59–67 | 7–11 (3–3) | |
| Jan 31, 2009 | | Central Michigan | L 65–72 | 7–12 (3–4) | |
| Feb 4, 2009 | | at Eastern Michigan | W 52–41 | 8–12 (4–4) | |
| Feb 8, 2009 | | at Toledo | L 51–60 | 8–13 (4–5) | |
| Feb 11, 2009 | | Western Michigan | L 56–74 | 8–14 (4–6) | |
| Feb 14, 2009 | | at Ball State | L 72–80 | 8–15 (4–7) | |
| Feb 17, 2009* | | Utah Valley | W 83–74 | 9–15 | |
| Feb 21, 2009 | | Buffalo | W 80–77 | 10–15 (5–7) | |
| Feb 25, 2009 | | Kent State | W 68–58 | 11–15 (6–7) | |
| Feb 28, 2009 | | Miami (OH) | W 60–48 | 12–15 (7–7) | |
| Mar 4, 2009 | | at Akron | L 57–58 | 12–16 (7–8) | |
| Mar 7, 2009 | | at No. 25 Bowling Green | L 64–79 | 12–17 (7–9) | |
MAC Tournament
| Mar 11, 2009 | | Western Michigan | W 68–57 | 13–17 | |
| Mar 13, 2009 | | vs. Toledo | L 70–77 | 13–18 | |
*Non-conference game. ^{#}Rankings from AP Poll. (#) Tournament seedings in parentheses. All times are in Eastern Time.

== Awards and honors ==
=== All-MAC Awards ===
Postseason All-MAC teams
| Team | Player | Position | Year |
|---|---|---|---|
| All-MAC Second team | Lauren Hmiel | G | |
| All-MAC Third team | Jennifer Bushby | G | Jr. |
