= 2004 SEC women's basketball tournament =

American college basketball postseason tournament

- Classification: Division I
- Teams: 12
- Site: Gaylord Entertainment Center; Nashville, TN
- Champions: Vanderbilt (4 title)
- Winning coach: Melanie Balcomb (3 title)
- MVP: Carla Thomas (Vanderbilt)
- Attendance: 39,214

The 2004 Southeastern Conference women's basketball tournament was the postseason women's basketball tournament for the Southeastern Conference (SEC) held at the Gaylord Entertainment Center in Nashville, Tennessee, from March 4–7, 2004. The Vanderbilt Commodores won the tournament and earned an automatic bid to the 2004 NCAA Division I women's basketball tournament.

== Seeds ==
All teams in the conference participated in the tournament. Teams were seeded by their conference record.

Seed	School	Conference record	Overall record	Tiebreaker
1	Tennessee^{‡†}	14–0	31–4	
2	LSU^{†}	10–4	27–8	
3	Auburn^{†}	9–5	22–9	
4	Florida^{†}	8–6	19–11	3–0 vs. Georgia/Vanderbilt
5	Georgia	8–6	25–10	1–2 vs. Florida/Vanderbilt
6	Vanderbilt	8–6	26–8	0–3 vs. Georgia/Florida
7	Ole Miss	7–7	17–14	2–0 vs. Mississippi State
8	Mississippi State	7–7	14–15	0–2 vs. Ole Miss
9	Arkansas	5–9	16–12	
10	Alabama	4–10	12–16	
11	Kentucky	3–11	11–17	
12	South Carolina	1–13	10–18	
‡ – SEC regular season champions, and tournament No. 1 seed. † – Received a bye in the conference tournament. Overall records include all games played in the SEC Tournament.

== Schedule ==
Game	Matchup^{#}	Score
First Round – Wed, Mar 4
1	No. 5 Georgia vs. No. 12 South Carolina	73–42
2	No. 8 Mississippi State vs. No. 9 Arkansas	79–74
3	No. 7 Ole Miss vs. No. 10 Alabama	63–56
4	No. 6 Vanderbilt vs. No. 11 Kentucky	60–41
Quarterfinal – Thu, Mar 5
5	No. 3 Auburn vs. No. 6 Vanderbilt	74–76
6	No. 4 Florida vs. No. 5 Georgia	72–76
7	No. 2 LSU vs. No. 7 Ole Miss	79–66
8	No. 1 Tennessee vs. No. 8 Mississippi State	67–57
Semifinal – Fri, Mar 6
9	No. 2 LSU vs. No. 6 Vanderbilt	66–78
10	No. 1 Tennessee vs. No. 5 Georgia	66–68
Championship – Sat, Mar 7
11	No. 5 Georgia vs. No. 6 Vanderbilt	56–62
# – Rankings denote tournament seed

== Bracket ==
First round Wed, Mar 4
8	Mississippi State	79
9	Arkansas	74
5	Georgia	73
12	South Carolina	42
7	Ole Miss	63
10	Alabama	56
6	Vanderbilt	60
11	Kentucky	41

Quarterfinals; Thu, Mar 5
1	Tennessee	67
8	Mississippi State	57
4	Florida	72
5	Georgia	76
2	LSU	79
7	Ole Miss	66
3	Auburn	74
6	Vanderbilt	76

Semifinals; Fri, Mar 6
1	Tennessee	66
5	Georgia	68
2	LSU	66
6	Vanderbilt	78

Championship; Sat, Mar 7
5	Georgia	56
6	Vanderbilt	62
