= Amanda Jackson =

American-Armenian basketball player

Personal information
- Born: June 27, 1985 (age 40) Springfield, Ohio, U.S.
- Listed height: 1.75 m (5 ft 9 in)

Career information
- High school: South High School
- College: Miami University
- WNBA draft: 2008: undrafted
- Playing career: 2008–2015
- Position: Shooting guard

Career history
- 2008–2009: Sport Alges Dafundo
- 2009: CB Puig d'en Valls
- 2010: Hatis Yerevan
- 2010–2011: Saint-Amand Hainaut Basket
- 2011: France – LFB
- 2012: Elitzur Ramla
- 2012–2014: Saint-Amand Hainaut Basket
- 2014–2015: Energa Toruń

Career highlights
- MAC Tournament MVP (2008); 2x First-team All-MAC (2007, 2008); MAC All-Freshman Team (2004)

Amanda Michelle Jackson (born June 27, 1985) is an American-Armenian female basketball player. Jackson played college basketball for the Miami Redhawks at Miami University. She led the Redhawks to their first NCAA tournament and as of 2016, ranks second as their all-time leading scorer. She was inducted into the Springfield City School District Athletic Hall of Fame in 2018.

== Miami (Ohio) statistics ==
Legend
GP	Games played	GS	Games started	MPG	Minutes per game
FG%	Field goal percentage	3P%	3-point field goal percentage	FT%	Free throw percentage
RPG	Rebounds per game	APG	Assists per game	SPG	Steals per game
BPG	Blocks per game	PPG	Points per game	**Bold**	Career high

Year	Team	GP	Points	FG%	3P%	FT%	RPG	APG	SPG	BPG	PPG
2003–04	Miami (Ohio)	31	391	**43.3%**	**34.3%**	82.4%	3.4	2.2	**2.7**	**0.2**	12.6
2004–05	Miami (Ohio)	27	353	36.1%	18.2%	77.9%	4.6	2.6	2.2	0.1	13.1
2005–06	Miami (Ohio)	1	8	37.5%	0.0%	66.7%	2.0	–	1.0	–	8.0
2006–07	Miami (Ohio)	30	515	39.4%	33.8%	83.6%	**4.7**	2.9	2.7	0.1	17.2
2007–08	Miami (Ohio)	**33**	**712**	39.4%	29.5%	**84.5%**	4.4	**3.1**	2.7	0.1	**21.6**
Career		122	1979	39.4%	29.6%	82.6%	4.2	2.7	2.6	0.1	16.2

== Professional career ==
After college, Jackson signed with the Chicago Sky's on a WNBA training camp contract but failed to yield a professional contract. She then turned to play basketball internationally.
