= 2003–04 NCAA Division I women's basketball rankings =

- Season: 2003–04
- NCAA Tournament: 2004
- Preseason No. 1: Connecticut (AP) Duke (Coaches)
- NCAA Tournament Champions: Connecticut
NCAA Division I women's basketball rankings


Two human polls comprise the 2003–04 NCAA Division I women's basketball rankings, the AP Poll and the Coaches Poll, in addition to various publications' preseason polls. The AP poll is currently a poll of sportswriters, while the USA Today Coaches' Poll is a poll of college coaches. The AP conducts polls weekly through the end of the regular season and conference play, while the Coaches poll conducts a final, post-NCAA tournament poll as well.

== Legend ==
–	No votes
(#)	Ranking

== AP Poll ==
Team	10-Nov	17-Nov	24-Nov	1-Dec	8-Dec	15-Dec	22-Dec	29-Dec	5-Jan	12-Jan	19-Jan	26-Jan	2-Feb	9-Feb	16-Feb	23-Feb	1-Mar	8-Mar	15-Mar
Duke	2	4	4	4	3	3	4	4	1	1	1	2	2	4	4	3	2	1	1
Tennessee	4	3	3	3	2	2	2	5	5	5	2	1	1	3	3	2	1	5	2
Purdue	7	5	8	7	8	8	6	7	10	9	8	6	6	5	5	4	6	6	3
Texas	3	2	2	2	5	5	5	3	3	3	3T	3	3	1	1	5	3	2	4
Penn St.	8	9	7	8	7	6	10	10	9	8	7	5	5	8	7	6	5	4	5
UConn	1	1	1	1	1	1	1	1	4	4	5	4	4	2	2	1	4	3	6
Louisiana Tech	12	11	12	10	12	12	8	8	8	12	11	9	8	6	6	7	7	7	7
Kansas St.	5	8	9	12	11	11	11	11	11	10	9T	12	10	9	8	9	8	8	8
Houston	–	–	–	–	–	–	–	–	–	–	25	–	–	25	21	17	11	11	9
Stanford	6	6	6	6	6	7	9	9	7	7	6	8	7	11	10	10	12	12	10
Oklahoma	21	21	19	16	14	13	15	15	15	15T	15	20	–	–	24	23	17	19	11
North Carolina	14	14	13	13	16	15	14	14	13	13	13	10	12	15	16	11	10	9	12
Vanderbilt	–	–	–	–	–	–	–	24	–	–	–	24	–	–	–	24	21	15	13
Texas Tech	10	7	5	5	4	4	3	2	2	2	3T	7	9	7	9	8	9	10	14
Baylor	–	–	–	–	–	–	–	–	24	24	19	16	17	18	19	16	14	14	15
Georgia	11	10	10	11	10	10	12	12	12	11	17	19	16	19	18	19	20	16	16
Colorado	20	T16	20	17	17	14	13	13	14	15T	14	11	11	12	13	14	13	13	17
Boston College	–	–	–	–	23	25	25	22	20	22	24	–	–	–	23	–	–	23	18
LSU	9	12	18	18	18	16	17	17	17	14	12	15	14	16	15	15	15	17	19
TCU	24	23	23	21	19	22	19	19	19	18	21	21	18	22	17	13	16	18	20
Ohio St.	17	T16	14	14	13	18	18	18	22	–	–	–	–	–	–	25	22	20	21
Auburn	22	25	25	25	24	23	20	21	21	20	22	22	19	14	14	18	19	21	22
Michigan St.	–	–	–	24	25	24	24	23	23	25	20	18	20	17	20	22	25	24	23
Minnesota	13	13	11	9	9	9	7	6	6	6	9T	14	13	10	11	12	18	22	24
Villanova	–	–	–	–	–	–	–	–	–	19	23	–	–	–	–	–	23	25	25
Arizona	23	22	21	–	–	–	–	–	–	–	–	–	–	24	–	–	–	–	–
DePaul	–	–	–	–	–	–	22	20	18	17	16	13	15	13	12	20	24	–	–
Florida	–	–	–	–	–	–	–	–	–	–	–	–	24	20	–	–	–	–	–
Miami (FL)	–	–	–	–	–	–	–	–	25	21	18	17	22	–	22	21	–	–	–
Missouri St.	–	–	–	–	–	–	–	–	–	–	–	–	25	23	–	–	–	–	–
Nebraska	–	–	–	–	–	–	–	–	–	–	–	25	–	–	–	–	–	–	–
Notre Dame	15	20	17	–	–	–	–	–	–	–	–	–	23	–	–	–	–	–	–
Oregon	–	24	24	20	22	21	–	–	–	–	–	–	–	–	–	–	–	–	–
Rutgers	16	15	15	22	–	–	–	–	–	–	–	–	–	–	–	–	–	–	–
UC Santa Barbara	18	18	16	15	15	20	21	–	–	–	–	–	–	–	–	–	–	–	–
Utah	19	19	22	19	21	19	23	25	–	–	–	–	–	–	25	–	–	–	–
Virginia	25	–	–	–	–	–	–	–	–	–	–	–	–	–	–	–	–	–	–
Virginia Tech	–	–	–	23	20	17	16	16	16	23	–	23	21	21	–	–	–	–	–

== USA Today Coaches poll ==
Team	PS	25-Nov	2-Dec	9-Dec	16-Dec	23-Dec	30-Dec	6-Jan	13-Jan	20-Jan	27-Jan	3-Feb	10-Feb	17-Feb	24-Feb	3-Mar	10-Mar	17-Mar	9-Apr
UConn	5	4	2	2	2	2	2	2	2	2	2	1	1	1	1	1	1	2	1
Tennessee	2	5	5	5	4	5	5	5	5	4	4	3	3	3	3	3	4	4	2
Texas	11	16	16	21	21	15	18	20	18	16	13	12	11	11	10	7	7	5	3
Duke	1	1	1	1	1	1	1	1	1	1	1	2	2	2	2	2	2	1	4
LSU	4	3	3	3	3	3	3	3	3	6	5	4	4	4	4	5	3	3	5
Texas Tech	13	11	10	10	10	10	9	8	7	7	8	8	8	9	8	10	9	8	6
Purdue	7	6	6	6	6	6	6	7	8	11	9	9	9	10	12	12	11	10	7
Villanova	–	–	–	–	–	–	–	–	25	24	21	22	20	20	17	18	14	12	8
Louisiana Tech	10	14	13	16	17	17	15	13	12	12	10	10	10	7	6	6	6	6	9
Kansas St.	3	2	7	7	7	4	4	4	4	3	3	5	5	5	5	4	5	7	10
Georgia	9	9	17	20	20	22	–	–	–	–	20	18	16	16	16	19	19	20	11
Penn St.	14	13	12	12	15	16	14	16	15	15	15	14	12	13	15	15	16	16	12
Minnesota	17	17	14	13	12	11	10	11	11	10	14	16	18	17	14	14	18	18	13
Stanford	6	7	4	4	5	7	7	5	5	5	7	7	6	8	9	8	8	9	14
North Carolina	15	12	15	14	13	13	12	9	10	9	6	6	7	6	7	9	10	11	15
Mississippi St.	23	19	19	15	14	14	17	15	14	13	12	11	14	12	11	11	12	13	16
Boston College	20	19	20	18	18	19	22	24	22	25	25	20	22	22	21	23	–	–	17
South Carolina	–	–	22	19	19	18	16	12	13	14	16	15	15	15	13	13	13	15	18
Colorado	–	–	–	–	–	–	25	23	–	–	–	–	–	–	–	–	–	–	19
Vanderbilt	8	8	8	9	8	8	11	14	16	17	17	19	19	19	18	16	15	14	20
Notre Dame	12	10	9	8	11	12	13	17	20	23	24	–	–	–	–	–	–	–	21
UC Santa Barbara	–	–	–	–	–	23	23	21	19	21	19	17	17	18	19	17	17	17	22
New Mexico	–	–	–	–	25	–	–	–	–	–	–	–	–	–	–	–	–	–	23
Green Bay	–	–	–	–	–	24	21	19	17	18	23	23	21	21	22	22	21	19	24
Arkansas	16	15	11	11	9	9	8	10	9	7	11	13	13	14	19	21	20	21	25
Arizona	–	–	–	24	24	21	20	18	21	19	22	25	23	24	24	24	22	22	–
BYU	–	–	22	23	23	–	–	–	–	–	–	–	–	–	–	–	–	–	–
Cincinnati	21	25	–	25	–	–	–	–	–	–	–	–	–	–	–	–	–	–	–
Colorado St.	24	–	–	–	–	–	–	–	–	–	–	–	–	–	–	–	–	–	–
DePaul	–	–	–	–	–	25	24	25	24	20	–	–	–	–	–	–	–	–	–
George Washington	–	24	21	22	22	–	–	–	–	–	–	–	–	–	–	–	–	25	–
Iowa St.	18	18	24	–	–	–	–	–	–	–	–	–	–	–	–	–	–	–	–
Liberty	–	–	–	–	–	–	–	–	–	–	–	–	–	–	–	–	25	–	–
Ohio St.	–	–	–	–	–	–	–	–	–	–	–	–	24	–	–	–	24	23	–
Oklahoma	25	22	18	17	16	20	19	22	23	22	18	21	–	–	–	–	–	–	–
Old Dominion	22	–	–	–	–	–	–	–	–	–	–	–	–	–	–	–	–	–	–
Rutgers	–	–	–	–	–	–	–	–	–	–	–	–	25	23	23	20	23	24	–
TCU	19	21	25	–	–	–	–	–	–	–	–	–	–	–	–	–	–	–	–
Utah	–	–	–	–	–	–	–	–	–	–	–	–	–	–	25	25	–	–	–
Virginia	–	23	–	–	–	–	–	–	–	–	–	–	–	–	–	–	–	–	–
Washington	–	–	–	–	–	–	–	–	–	–	–	24	–	25	–	–	–	–	–
