= 2004 NCAA Division I women's basketball tournament =

American college basketball tournament

- Teams: 64
- Finals site: New Orleans Arena, New Orleans, Louisiana
- Champions: Connecticut Huskies (5th title, 5th title game, 8th Final Four)
- Runner-up: Tennessee Volunteers (11th title game, 15th Final Four)
- Semifinalists: Minnesota Golden Gophers (1st Final Four); LSU Tigers (1st Final Four)
- Winning coach: Geno Auriemma (5th title)
- MOP: Diana Taurasi (Connecticut)

The 2004 NCAA Division I women's basketball tournament began on March 20 and concluded on April 6 when Connecticut won a third consecutive national championship, becoming only the second school in history to accomplish such a feat. The Final Four was held at the New Orleans Arena in New Orleans, Louisiana, on April 4–6 and was hosted by Tulane University. UConn, coached by Geno Auriemma, defeated archrivals Tennessee, coached by Pat Summitt, 81–67 in the championship game. UConn's Diana Taurasi was named Most Outstanding Player for the second consecutive year.

== Tournament records ==
- Final Four appearances – Connecticut appeared in their fifth consecutive Final Four, tied for the longest such streak, with LSU (2004–08)
- Rebounds – Janel McCarville, Minnesota recorded 75 rebounds, the most ever recorded in an NCAA tournament. This record would be broken in 2018 when Mississippi State's Teaira McCowan recorded 109 rebounds.
- Assists – Temeka Johnson, LSU, recorded 50 assists, the most ever recorded in an NCAA tournament

== Qualifying teams – automatic ==
Sixty-four teams were selected to participate in the 2004 NCAA Tournament. Thirty-one conferences were eligible for an automatic bid to the 2004 NCAA tournament.

Automatic bids
		Record		
Qualifying school	Conference	Regular season	Conference	Seed
Austin Peay State University	Ohio Valley Conference	23–7	14–2	13
Boston College	Big East	25–6	11–5	3
University of Tennessee at Chattanooga	Southern Conference	28–2	20–0	10
Colgate University	Patriot League	21–9	10–4	16
Duke University	ACC	27–3	15–1	1
Eastern Michigan University	MAC	22–7	12–4	14
University of Wisconsin–Green Bay	Horizon League	23–7	13–3	14
Hampton University	MEAC	17–10	14–4	16
University of Houston	Conference USA	27–3	13–1	3
Liberty University	Big South Conference	25–6	14–0	14
Lipscomb University	Atlantic Sun Conference	20–11	14–6	15
Louisiana Tech University	WAC	27–2	17–1	5
Loyola Marymount University	West Coast Conference	24–5	13–1	13
University of Maine	America East	25–6	17–1	13
Marist College	MAAC	20–10	13–5	14
Middle Tennessee State University	Sun Belt Conference	23–7	10–4	13
Missouri State University	Missouri Valley Conference	28–3	16–2	12
University of Montana	Big Sky Conference	27–4	14–0	12
University of New Mexico	Mountain West	23–7	12–2	12
Northwestern State University	Southland	24–6	14–2	16
University of Oklahoma	Big 12	23–8	9–7	3
Old Dominion University	Colonial	25–6	17–1	8
University of Pennsylvania	Ivy League	17–10	11–3	15
Purdue University	Big Ten	27–3	14–2	2
Southern University	SWAC	17–12	12–6	16
St. Francis (PA)	Northeast Conference	25–5	18–0	15
Stanford University	Pac-10	24–6	14–4	6
Temple University	Atlantic 10	21–9	14–2	11
University of California, Santa Barbara	Big West Conference	25–6	17–1	11
Valparaiso University	Mid-Continent	20–11	11–5	15
Vanderbilt University	SEC	24–7	8–6	2

== Qualifying teams – at-large ==
Thirty-three additional teams were selected to complete the sixty-four invitations.

At-large bids
		Record		
Qualifying school	Conference	Regular season	Conference	Seed
University of Arizona	Pacific-10	24–8	14–4	9
Auburn University	Southeastern	21–8	9–5	7
Baylor University	Big 12	24–8	10–6	4
University of Colorado at Boulder	Big 12	22–7	11–5	6
University of Connecticut	Big East	25–4	14–2	2
DePaul University	Conference USA	22–6	10–4	9
University of Florida	Southeastern	18–10	8–6	5
The George Washington University	Atlantic 10	22–7	14–2	8
University of Georgia	Southeastern	22–9	8–6	3
University of Iowa	Big Ten	16–12	10–6	9
Kansas State University	Big 12	24–5	14–2	2
Louisiana State University	Southeastern	23–7	10–4	4
Marquette University	Conference USA	21–9	9–5	9
University of Maryland	Atlantic Coast	17–12	8–8	12
University of Miami	Big East	22–6	11–5	5
Michigan State University	Big Ten	21–8	10–6	8
University of Minnesota	Big Ten	21–8	9–7	7
University of Mississippi (Ole Miss)	Southeastern	17–13	7–7	10
University of Missouri	Big 12	17–12	7–9	11
University of North Carolina	Atlantic Coast	24–6	12–4	4
North Carolina State University	Atlantic Coast	17–14	8–8	10
University of Notre Dame	Big East	19–10	12–4	5
Ohio State University	Big Ten	20–9	11–5	6
Pennsylvania State University	Big Ten	25–5	15–1	1
Rutgers University	Big East	21–11	10–6	7
Texas Christian University	Conference USA	24–6	11–3	6
University of Tennessee	Southeastern	26–3	14–0	1
University of Texas at Austin	Big 12	28–4	14–2	1
Texas Tech University	Big 12	24–7	10–6	4
University of California, Los Angeles	Pacific-10	17–12	11–7	10
Villanova University	Big East	22–6	12–4	7
Virginia Tech	Big East	22–7	10–6	8
West Virginia University	Big East	21–10	10–6	11

== Bids by conference ==
Thirty-one conferences earned an automatic bid. In twenty-three cases, the automatic bid was the only representative from the conference. Thirty-three additional at-large teams were selected from eight of the conferences.

Bids	Conference	Teams
8	Big East	Boston College, Connecticut, Miami FL, Notre Dame, Rutgers, Villanova, Virginia Tech, West Virginia
7	Big 12	Oklahoma, Baylor, Colorado, Kansas St., Missouri, Texas, Texas Tech
7	Southeastern	Vanderbilt, Auburn, Florida, Georgia, LSU, Ole Miss, Tennessee
6	Big Ten	Purdue, Iowa, Michigan St., Minnesota, Ohio St., Penn St.
4	Atlantic Coast	Duke, Maryland., North Carolina, North Carolina St.
4	Conference USA	Houston, DePaul, Marquette, TCU
3	Pacific-10	Stanford, Arizona, UCLA
2	Atlantic 10	Temple, George Washington
1	America East	Maine
1	Atlantic Sun	Lipscomb
1	Big Sky	Montana
1	Big South	Liberty
1	Big West	UC Santa Barb.
1	Colonial	Old Dominion
1	Horizon	Green Bay
1	Ivy	Penn
1	Metro Atlantic	Marist
1	Mid-American	Eastern Mich.
1	Mid-Continent	Valparaiso
1	Mid-Eastern	Hampton
1	Missouri Valley	Missouri St.
1	Mountain West	New Mexico
1	Northeast	St. Francis Pa.
1	Ohio Valley	Austin Peay
1	Patriot	Colgate
1	Southern	Chattanooga
1	Southland	Northwestern St.
1	Southwestern	Southern U.
1	Sun Belt	Middle Tenn.
1	West Coast	Loyola Marymount
1	Western Athletic	Louisiana Tech

== First and second rounds ==
2004 NCAA NCAA first and second round venues

In 2004, the field remained at 64 teams. The teams were seeded, and assigned to four geographic regions, with seeds 1-16 in each region. In Round 1, seeds 1 and 16 faced each other, as well as seeds 2 and 15, seeds 3 and 14, seeds 4 and 13, seeds 5 and 12, seeds 6 and 11, seeds 7 and 10, and seeds 8 and 9. Sixteen sites for the first two rounds were determined approximately a year before the team selections and seedings were completed, following a practice established in 2003.

The following table lists the region, host school, venue and the sixteen first and second round locations:

Region	Rnd	Host	Venue	City	State
East	1&2	University of Notre Dame	Edmund P. Joyce Center	Notre Dame	Indiana
East	1&2	University of California, Santa Barbara	UC Santa Barbara Events Center	Santa Barbara	California
East	1&2	Virginia Tech	Cassell Coliseum	Blacksburg	Virginia
East	1&2	Fairfield University	Bridgeport Arena at Harbor Yard	Bridgeport	Connecticut
Mideast	1&2	University of Montana	Dahlberg Arena	Missoula	Montana
Mideast	1&2	Ohio State University	St. John Arena	Columbus	Ohio
Mideast	1&2	Duke University	Cameron Indoor Stadium	Durham	North Carolina
Mideast	1&2	University of Minnesota	Williams Arena	Minneapolis	Minnesota
Midwest	1&2	University of New Mexico	The Pit (arena)	Albuquerque	New Mexico
Midwest	1&2	Arizona State University	Wells Fargo Arena	Tempe	Arizona
Midwest	1&2	University of Tennessee at Chattanooga	McKenzie Arena	Chattanooga	Tennessee
Midwest	1&2	Florida State University	Tallahassee-Leon County Civic Center	Tallahassee	Florida
West	1&2	University of Texas	Frank Erwin Center	Austin	Texas
West	1&2	Louisiana State University	LSU Assembly Center (Pete Maravich Assembly Center)	Baton Rouge	Louisiana
West	1&2	Iowa State University	Hilton Coliseum	Ames	Iowa
West	1&2	Temple University	Liacouras Center	Philadelphia	Pennsylvania

== Regionals and Final Four ==
2004 NCAA regionals and Final Four

The Regionals, named for the general location, were held from March 27 to March 30 at these sites:

- Midwest Regional Lloyd Noble Center, Norman, Oklahoma (Host: University of Oklahoma)
- West Regional Hec Edmundson Pavilion, Seattle (Host: University of Washington)
- East Regional Hartford Civic Center, Hartford, Connecticut (Host: Big East Conference)
- Mideast Regional Ted Constant Convocation Center, Norfolk, Virginia (Host: Old Dominion University)

Each regional winner advanced to the Final Four held April 4 and April 6 in New Orleans at the New Orleans Arena (Host: Tulane University)

== Bids by state ==
The sixty-four teams came from thirty-two states, plus Washington, D.C. Tennessee had the most teams with six bids. Eighteen states did not have any teams receiving bids.

NCAA Women's basketball Tournament invitations by state 2004

Bids	State	Teams
6	Tennessee	Austin Peay, Chattanooga, Lipscomb, Middle Tenn., Vanderbilt, Tennessee
5	Texas	Houston, Baylor, TCU, Texas, Texas Tech
4	California	Loyola Marymount, Stanford, UC Santa Barb., UCLA
4	Louisiana	Louisiana Tech, Northwestern St., Southern U., LSU
4	Pennsylvania	Penn, Temple, Penn St., Villanova St. Francis Pa.
4	Virginia	Hampton, Liberty, Old Dominion, Virginia Tech
3	Indiana	Purdue, Valparaiso, Notre Dame
3	New York	Colgate, Marist,
3	North Carolina	Duke, North Carolina, North Carolina St.
2	Florida	Florida, Miami FL
2	Michigan	Eastern Mich., Michigan St.
2	Missouri	Missouri St., Missouri
2	Wisconsin	Green Bay, Marquette
1	Alabama	Auburn
1	Arizona	Arizona
1	Colorado	Colorado
1	Connecticut	Connecticut
1	District of Columbia	George Washington
1	Georgia	Georgia
1	Illinois	DePaul
1	Iowa	Iowa
1	Kansas	Kansas St.
1	Maine	Maine
1	Maryland	Maryland.
1	Massachusetts	Boston College
1	Minnesota	Minnesota
1	Mississippi	Ole Miss
1	Montana	Montana
1	New Jersey	Rutgers
1	New Mexico	New Mexico
1	Ohio	Ohio St.
1	Oklahoma	Oklahoma
1	West Virginia	West Virginia

== Brackets ==
Data Source

=== East Region – Hartford, Connecticut ===
First round March 20 and 21
1	Penn State	79
16	Hampton	42
Blacksburg, Virginia
8	Virginia Tech	89
9	Iowa	76
5	Notre Dame	69*
12	Missouri State	65
South Bend, Indiana
4	North Carolina	62
13	Middle Tennessee	67
6	Colorado	49
11	UC Santa Barbara	76
Santa Barbara, California
3	Houston	62
14	Green Bay	47
7	Auburn	79
10	NC State	59
Bridgeport, Connecticut
2	Connecticut	91
15	Pennsylvania	55

Second round March 22 and 23
1	Penn State	61
8	Virginia Tech	48
5	Notre Dame	59
13	Middle Tennessee	46
11	UC Santa Barbara	56
3	Houston	52
7	Auburn	53
2	Connecticut	79

Regional semifinals March 27
1	Penn State	55
5	Notre Dame	49
11	UC Santa Barbara	57
2	Connecticut	63

Regional finals March 29
1	Penn State	49
2	Connecticut	66

=== Mideast Region – Norfolk, Virginia ===
First round March 20 and 21
1	Duke	103
16	Northwestern State	51
Durham, North Carolina
8	Old Dominion	64
9	Marquette	67
5	Louisiana Tech	81
12	Montana	77
Missoula, Montana
4	Texas Tech	60
13	Maine	50
6	Ohio State	73
11	West Virginia	67
Columbus, Ohio
3	Boston College	58
14	Eastern Michigan	56
7	Minnesota	92
10	UCLA	81
Minneapolis, Minnesota
2	Kansas State	71
15	Valparaiso	63

Second round March 22 and 23
1	Duke	76
9	Marquette	67
5	Louisiana Tech	81
4	Texas Tech	64
6	Ohio State	48
3	Boston College	63
7	Minnesota	80
2	Kansas State	61

Regional semifinals March 28
1	Duke	63
5	Louisiana Tech	49
3	Boston College	63
7	Minnesota	76

Regional finals March 30
1	Duke	75
7	Minnesota	82

=== Midwest Region – Norman, Oklahoma ===
First round March 20 and 21
1	Tennessee	77
16	Colgate	54
Tallahassee, Florida
8	George Washington	46
9	DePaul	83
5	Florida	68
12	New Mexico	56
Albuquerque, New Mexico
4	Baylor	71
13	Loyola Marymount	60
6	Stanford	68
11	Missouri	44
Tempe, Arizona
3	Oklahoma	58
14	Marist	45
7	Rutgers	69
10	Chattanooga	74
Chattanooga, Tennessee
2	Vanderbilt	76
15	Lipscomb	45

Second round March 22 and 23
1	Tennessee	79
9	DePaul	59
5	Florida	76
4	Baylor	91
6	Stanford	68
3	Oklahoma	43
10	Chattanooga	44
2	Vanderbilt	60

Regional semifinals March 28
1	Tennessee	71
4	Baylor	69
6	Stanford	57
2	Vanderbilt	55

Regional finals March 30
1	Tennessee	62
6	Stanford	60

=== West Region – Seattle ===
First round March 20 and 21
1	Texas	92
16	Southern	57
Austin, Texas
8	Michigan State	72
9	Arizona	60
5	Miami (FL)	85
12	Maryland	86
Baton Rouge, Louisiana
4	LSU	83
13	Austin Peay	66
6	TCU	70
11	Temple	57
Philadelphia
3	Georgia	78
14	Liberty	53
7	Villanova	66
10	Ole Miss	63
Ames, Iowa
2	Purdue	78
15	Saint Francis	59

Second round March 22 and 23
1	Texas	80
8	Michigan State	61
12	Maryland	61
4	LSU	76
6	TCU	71
3	Georgia	85
7	Villanova	42
2	Purdue	60

Regional semifinals March 27
1	Texas	55
4	LSU	71
3	Georgia	66
2	Purdue	64

Regional finals March 29
4	LSU	62
3	Georgia	60

=== Final Four – New Orleans ===
National semifinals April 4
E2	Connecticut	67
ME7	Minnesota	58
MW1	Tennessee	52
W4	LSU	50

National championship April 6
E2	Connecticut	70
MW1	Tennessee	61

E-East; ME-Mideast; MW-Midwest; W-West.

== Record by conference ==
Conference	# of Bids	Record	Win %	Sweet Sixteen	Elite Eight	Final Four	Championship Game
Big East	8	12-7	63.2%	3	1	1	1
SEC	7	16-7	69.6%	4	3	2	1
Big 12	7	7-7	50.0%	2	0	0	0
Big Ten	6	11-6	64.7%	3	2	1	0
ACC	4	4-4	50.0%	1	1	0	0
Conference USA	4	4-4	50.0%	0	0	0	0
Pac-10	3	3-3	50.0%	1	1	0	0
Atlantic 10	2	0-2	0.0%	0	0	0	0
Big West Conference	1	2-1	66.7%	1	0	0	0
WAC	1	2-1	66.7%	1	0	0	0
Southern Conference	1	1-1	50.0%	0	0	0	0
Sun Belt Conference	1	1-1	50.0%	0	0	0	0

Nineteen conferences went 0-1: America East, Atlantic Sun Conference, Big Sky Conference, Big South Conference Colonial, Horizon League, Ivy League, MAAC, MAC, Summit League, MEAC, Missouri Valley Conference, Mountain West, Northeast Conference, Ohio Valley Conference, Patriot League, Southland, SWAC, and West Coast Conference

== All-Tournament team ==
- Diana Taurasi, Connecticut
- Jessica Moore, Connecticut
- Ann Strother, Connecticut
- Janel McCarville, Minnesota
- Shanna Zolman Tennessee

== Game officials ==
- Scott Yarbrough (semifinal)
- Sally Bell (semifinal)
- Tina Napier (semifinal)
- Melissa Barlow (semifinal)
- Greg Small (semifinal)
- Bill Titus (semifinal)
- Dee Kantner (final)
- Melissa Barlow (final)
- Bryan Enterline (final)

== See also ==
- NCAA Women's Division I Basketball Championship
- 2004 NCAA Division I men's basketball tournament
- 2004 NAIA Division I men's basketball tournament
