= 2012–13 Mid-American Conference women's basketball season =

- League: NCAA Division I
- Sport: Basketball
- Teams: 12

Regular season
- Champions: Toledo
- Season MVP: Rachel Tecca

Tournament
- Champions: Central Michigan
- Runners-up: Akron
- Finals MVP: Crystal Bradford

Mid-American women's basketball seasons
- ← 2011–12 2013–14 →

2012–13 Mid-American Conference women's basketball standings
	Conf.				Overall
Team	W		L	PCT	W		L	PCT
Akron	12	–	4	.750	23	–	9	.719
Bowling Green	11	–	5	.688	22	–	10	.688
Miami (OH)	10	–	6	.625	19	–	12	.613
Buffalo	8	–	8	.500	12	–	20	.375
Ohio	1	–	15	.063	6	–	23	.207
Kent State	1	–	15	.063	3	–	27	.100
West
Toledo	15	–	1	.938	27	–	3	.900
Central Michigan†	12	–	4	.750	21	–	11	.656
Ball State	12	–	4	.750	15	–	15	.500
Western Michigan	6	–	10	.375	11	–	20	.355
Eastern Michigan	6	–	10	.375	8	–	22	.267
Northern Illinois	2	–	14	.125	7	–	23	.233
† 2013 MAC tournament winner Rankings from AP poll

The 2012–13 Mid-American Conference women's basketball season began with practices in October 2012, followed by the start of the 2012–13 NCAA Division I women's basketball season in November. Conference play began in January 2013 and concluded in March 2013. Toledo won the regular season title with a record of 15–1 by three games over Ball State, Akron, and Central Michigan. Rachel Tecca of Akron was named MAC player of the year.

Fourth seeded Central Michigan won the MAC tournament over third seeded Akron. Crystal Bradford of Central Michigan was the tournament MVP. Central Michigan lost to Oklahoma in the first round of the NCAA tournament. Toledo, Akron, Bowling Green, Miami and Ball State played in the WNIT.

== Preseason awards ==
The preseason poll and league awards were announced by the league office on October 30, 2012.

=== Preseason women's basketball poll ===
(First place votes in parentheses)

==== East Division ====
1. Miami (16)
2. Bowling Green (13)
3. Akron (1)
4. Ohio
5. Kent State
6. Buffalo

==== West Division ====
1. Toledo (24)
2. Central Michigan (6)
3. Eastern Michigan
4. Northern Illinois
5. Western Michigan
6. Ball State

==== Tournament champs ====
Toledo (16), Central Michigan (12), Bowling Green (2)

=== Honors ===
Honor	Recipient
Preseason All-MAC East	Rachel Tecca, Akron
Preseason All-MAC East	Alexis Rogers, Bowling Green
Preseason All-MAC East	Courtney Osborn, Miami
Preseason All-MAC East	Chrissy Steffen, Bowling Green
Preseason All-MAC East	Kristen Olowinski, Miami
Preseason All-MAC West	Crystal Bradford, Central Michigan
Preseason All-MAC West	Natachia Watkins, Eastern Michigan
Preseason All-MAC West	Naama Shafir, Toledo
Preseason All-MAC West	Andola Dortch, Toledo
Preseason All-MAC West	Yolanda Richardson, Toledo

== Postseason ==
=== Postseason awards ===
1. Coach of the Year: Tricia Cullop, Toledo
2. Player of the Year: Rachel Tecca, Akron
3. Freshman of the Year: Nathalie Fontaine, Ball State
4. Defensive Player of the Year: Andola Dortch, Toledo
5. Sixth Man of the Year: Shanee' Jackson, Ball State

=== Honors ===
Honor	Recipient
Postseason All-MAC First Team	Rachel Tecca, Akron, F
Postseason All-MAC First Team	Crystal Bradford, Central Michigan, G/F
Postseason All-MAC First Team	Courtney Osborn, Miami, G
Postseason All-MAC First Team	Andola Dortch, Toledo, G
Postseason All-MAC First Team	Naama Shafir, Toledo, G
Postseason All-MAC Second Team	Nathalie Fontaine, Ball State, G
Postseason All-MAC Second Team	Alexis Rogers, Bowling Green, C
Postseason All-MAC Second Team	Chrissy Steffen, Bowling Green, G
Postseason All-MAC Second Team	Kirsten Olowinski, Miami F
Postseason All-MAC Second Team	Yolanda Richardson, Toledo, C
Postseason All-MAC Third Team	Sina King, Akron, G/F
Postseason All-MAC Third Team	Hanna Luburgh, Akron, G
Postseason All-MAC Third Team	Brandy Woody, Ball State, G
Postseason All-MAC Third Team	Jessica Green, Central Michigan, G
Postseason All-MAC Third Team	Inma Zanoguera, Toledo, G/F
Postseason All-MAC Honorable Mention	Christa Baccas, Buffalo, F/C
Postseason All-MAC Honorable Mention	Mackenzie Loesing, Buffalo, G
Postseason All-MAC Honorable Mention	Brandie Baker, Central Michigan, G/F
Postseason All-MAC Honorable Mention	Jessica Schroll, Central Michigan, G/F
Postseason All-MAC Honorable Mention	Marquisha Harris, Western Michigan, F
All-MAC Freshman Team	Nathalie Fontaine, Ball State, G
All-MAC Freshman Team	Mackenzie Loesing, Buffalo, G
All-MAC Freshman Team	Bianca Cage, Eastern Michigan, G
All-MAC Freshman Team	Kiyanna Black, Ohio, G
All-MAC Freshman Team	Miracle Woods, Western Michigan, C

== See also ==
2012–13 Mid-American Conference men's basketball season
