= 2021 MAC women's basketball tournament =

- Classification: Division I
- Season: 2020–21
- Teams: 8
- Quarterfinals site: Quicken Loans Arena; Cleveland, Ohio
- Semifinals site: Quicken Loans Arena; Cleveland, Ohio
- Finals site: Quicken Loans Arena; Cleveland, Ohio
- Champions: Central Michigan (5th title)
- Winning coach: Heather Oesterle (1st title)
- MVP: Micaela Kelly (Central Michigan)
- Television: CBSSN, ESPN+
- MAC women's basketball tournaments

2020–21 Mid-American Conference women's basketball standings
	Conf.				Overall
Team	W		L	PCT	W		L	PCT
Bowling Green	14	–	4	.778	20	–	5	.800
Central Michigan†	13	–	6	.684	17	–	8	.680
Ohio	11	–	6	.647	14	–	8	.636
Buffalo	11	–	6	.647	15	–	9	.625
Kent State	10	–	6	.625	11	–	9	.550
Ball State	12	–	8	.600	14	–	11	.560
Northern Illinois	10	–	8	.556	12	–	12	.500
Eastern Michigan	7	–	7	.500	10	–	10	.500
Toledo	8	–	12	.400	12	–	12	.500
Western Michigan	5	–	14	.263	6	–	15	.286
Akron	4	–	14	.222	7	–	14	.333
Miami (OH)	3	–	17	.150	4	–	20	.167
† 2021 MAC tournament winner As of July 7, 2024; Rankings from AP poll

The 2021 MAC women's basketball tournament was the postseason basketball tournament that ended the 2020–21 college basketball season in the Mid-American Conference. Due to the ongoing COVID-19 pandemic, the entire tournament was held at Rocket Mortgage FieldHouse, in Cleveland, Ohio between March 10 and 13. The MAC Women's Tournament champion received the conference's automatic bid into the 2021 NCAA tournament. Central Michigan won the conference tournament championship game 77–72 over Bowling Green. Micaela Kelly was named the tournament's Most Valuable Player.

== Format ==
Unlike the 2020 MAC women's basketball tournament only the top 8 finishing teams qualified and all games were played on a neutral court.

== Seeds ==
Seed	School	Conference record	Division	Tiebreaker
1	Bowling Green	14-4	20-5	
2	Central Michigan	13-6	17-8	
3	Ohio	11-6	14-8	
4	Buffalo	11–6	15–9	
5	Kent State	10-6	11-9	
6	Ball State	12-8	15-9	
7	Northern Illinois	10–8	12–12	
8	Eastern Michigan	7–7	10-10	

== Schedule ==
Game	Time	Matchup	Score	Television
First round – Monday March 11 – Campus sites
Quarterfinals – Wednesday March 10 – Rocket Mortgage FieldHouse, Cleveland, OH
1	11:00 pm	No. 8 Eastern Michigan vs. No. 1 Bowling Green	47-63	ESPN+
2	1:45 pm	No. 5 Kent State vs. No. 4 Buffalo	66-73	ESPN+
3	4:25 pm	No. 7 Northern Illinois vs. No. 2 Central Michigan	69-83	ESPN+
4	6:50 pm	No. 6 Ball State vs. No. 3 Ohio	54–72	ESPN+
Semifinals – Friday March 12 – Rocket Mortgage FieldHouse, Cleveland, OH
5	10:00 am	No. 1 Bowling Green vs. No. 4 Buffalo	80-67	ESPN+
6	12:45 pm	No. 2 Central Michigan vs. No. 3 Ohio	100-92, OT	ESPN+
Championship – Saturday March 13 – Rocket Mortgage FieldHouse, Cleveland, OH
7	11:00 am	No. 1 Bowling Green vs. No. 2 Central Michigan	72-77	CBSSN
Game times in ET. Rankings denote tournament seed

== Bracket ==
Quarterfinals
1	Bowling Green	63
8	Eastern Michigan	47
4	Buffalo	73
5	Kent State	66
2	Central Michigan	83
7	Northern Illinois	69
3	Ohio	61
6	Ball State	59

Semifinals
1	Bowling Green	80
4	Buffalo	82
2	Central Michigan	100
3	Ohio	92

Championship
1	Bowling Green	72
2	Central Michigan	77

== See also ==
2021 MAC men's basketball tournament
