= 2020–21 Ball State Cardinals women's basketball team =

Intercollegiate basketball season

2020–21 Ball State Cardinals women's basketball
- Conference: Mid-American Conference
- West Division
- Head coach: Brady Sallee (7th season)
- Assistant coaches: Audrey McDonald-Spencer; Roman Tubner; Bri Kulas
- Home arena: Worthen Arena

2020–21 Mid-American Conference women's basketball standings
	Conf.				Overall
Team	W		L	PCT	W		L	PCT
Bowling Green	14	–	4	.778	20	–	5	.800
Central Michigan†	13	–	6	.684	17	–	8	.680
Ohio	11	–	6	.647	14	–	8	.636
Buffalo	11	–	6	.647	15	–	9	.625
Kent State	10	–	6	.625	11	–	9	.550
Ball State	12	–	8	.600	14	–	11	.560
Northern Illinois	10	–	8	.556	12	–	12	.500
Eastern Michigan	7	–	7	.500	10	–	10	.500
Toledo	8	–	12	.400	12	–	12	.500
Western Michigan	5	–	14	.263	6	–	15	.286
Akron	4	–	14	.222	7	–	14	.333
Miami (OH)	3	–	17	.150	4	–	20	.167
† 2021 MAC tournament winner As of July 7, 2024; Rankings from AP poll

The 2020–21 Ball State Cardinals women's basketball team represented Ball State University during the 2020–21 NCAA Division I women's basketball season. The Cardinals, led by ninth-year head coach Brady Sallee, played their home games at Worthen Arena in Muncie, Indiana as members of the West Division of the Mid-American Conference (MAC).

== Schedule ==
Date time, TV	Rank^{#}	Opponent^{#}	Result	Record	Site (attendance) city, state
Non-conference regular season
November 25, 2020*; 6:30 p.m., ESPN3		at Milwaukee	W 67–56	0–1	Klotsche Center; Milwaukee, WI
November 30, 2020*; 7:00 p.m., ESPN3		IUPUI	L 49–73	0–2	Worthen Arena (75); Muncie, IN
December 2, 2020; 6:00 p.m., ESPN+		Eastern Michigan	L 58–77	0–3 (0–1)	Worthen Arena (45); Muncie, IN
December 5, 2020*; 3:00 p.m., WKUSportsTV		at Western Kentucky	W 58–54	1–3	E. A. Diddle Arena (537); Bowling Green, KY
December 14, 2020*; 6:30 p.m., ESPN+		at Bellarmine	W 98–42	2–3	Freedom Hall (274); Louisville, KY
MAC regular season
December 20, 2020; 2:00 p.m., ESPN+		at Akron	W 67–60	3–3 (1–1)	James A. Rhodes Arena (15); Akron, OH
January 2, 2021; 7:00 p.m., ESPN+		Bowling Green	L 55–89	3–4 (1–2)	Worthen Arena (82); Muncie, IN
January 6, 2021; 7:00 p.m., ESPN+		Toledo	W 93–78	4–4 (2–2)	Worthen Arena (72); Muncie, IN
January 9, 2021; 12:00 p.m., ESPN+		at Kent State	L 61–70	4–5 (2–3)	MAC Center; Kent, OH
January 13, 2021; 6:00 p.m., ESPN+		at Ohio	W 88–85 ^{OT}	5–5 (3–3)	Convocation Center; Athens, OH
January 16, 2021; 5:00 p.m., ESPN+		Buffalo	Postponed due to COVID-19 issues		John E. Worthen Arena; Muncie, IN
January 20, 2021; 7:00 p.m.		Northern Illinois	Postponed due to COVID-19 issues		John E. Worthen Arena; Muncie, IN
January 23, 2021; 12:00 p.m.		at Eastern Michigan	W 68–64	6–5 (4–3)	Convocation Center; Ypsilanti, MI
January 27, 2021; 7:00 p.m.		Miami (OH)	W 85–82	7–5 (5–3)	John E. Worthen Arena (64); Muncie, IN
January 30, 2021; 2:00 p.m.		at Western Michigan	W 78–71	8–5 (6–3)	University Arena; Kalamazoo, MI
February 3, 2021; 5:00 p.m.		at Central Michigan	W 69–66	9–5 (7–3)	McGuirk Arena; Mount Pleasant, MI
February 6, 2021; 4:00 p.m.		Akron	L 84–89 ^{OT}	9–6 (7–4)	Worthen Arena (89); Muncie, IN
February 8, 2021; 2:00 p.m.		Northern Illinois; Rescheduled from January 20	L 74–78	9–7 (7–5)	Worthen Arena (51); Muncie, IN
February 10, 2021; 7:00 p.m.		Ohio	L 66–88	9–8 (7–6)	Worthen Arena (70); Muncie, IN
February 13, 2021; 1:00 p.m.		at Miami (OH)	W 79–77	10–8 (8–6)	Millett Hall; Oxford, OH
February 17, 2021; 5:00 p.m.		at Buffalo	W 76–63	11–8 (9–6)	Alumni Arena; Buffalo, NY
February 20, 2021; 1:00 p.m.		Buffalo; Rescheduled from January 16	L 76–83	11–9 (9–7)	Worthen Arena (65); Muncie, IN
February 24, 2021; 7:00 p.m.		at Northern Illinois	W 82–79	12–9 (10–7)	NIU Convocation Center (38); DeKalb, IL
February 27, 2021; 12:00 p.m.		at Toledo	W 88–77	13–9 (11–7)	Savage Arena; Toledo, OH
March 3, 2021; 7:00 p.m.		Central Michigan	L 81–87	13–10 (11–8)	Worthen Arena (86); Muncie, IN
March 6, 2021; 1:00 p.m.		Western Michigan	W 76–69	14–10 (12–8)	Worthen Arena (132); Muncie, IN
MAC women's tournament
March 10, 2021; 6:45 p.m.	(6)	vs. (3) Ohio; Quarterfinals	L 59–61	14–11	Rocket Mortgage FieldHouse; Cleveland, OH
*Non-conference game. ^{#}Rankings from AP poll. (#) Tournament seedings in parentheses. All times are in Eastern.

== See also ==
- 2020–21 Ball State Cardinals men's basketball team
