= 2019–20 Mid-American Conference women's basketball season =

- League: NCAA Division I
- Sport: Basketball
- Teams: 12

Regular season
- Champions: Central Michigan
- Runners-up: Ball State
- Season MVP: Micaela Kelly

Tournament

Mid-American women's basketball seasons
- ← 2018–19 2020–21 →

2019–20 Mid-American Conference women's basketball standings
	Conf.				Overall
Team	W		L	PCT	W		L	PCT
East
Kent State	11	–	7	.611	19	–	11	.633
Ohio	11	–	7	.611	19	–	11	.633
Buffalo	9	–	9	.500	19	–	12	.613
Akron	8	–	10	.444	15	–	15	.500
Miami (OH)	4	–	14	.222	11	–	20	.355
Bowling Green	3	–	15	.167	10	–	21	.323
West
Central Michigan	16	–	2	.889	23	–	7	.767
Ball State	13	–	5	.722	21	–	10	.677
Western Michigan	10	–	8	.556	18	–	13	.581
Eastern Michigan	9	–	9	.500	16	–	15	.516
Toledo	7	–	11	.389	14	–	17	.452
Northern Illinois	7	–	11	.389	11	–	19	.367
† 2020 MAC tournament winner Rankings from AP poll

The 2019–20 Mid-American Conference women's basketball season began with practices in October 2019, followed by the start of the 2019–20 NCAA Division I women's basketball season in November. Conference play began in January 2020 and concluded in March 2020. Central Michigan its fourth straight regular season title with a record of 15-1 by three games over Ball State. Micaela Kelly of Central Michigan was named MAC player of the year.

Central Michigan and Ball State were upset in the quarter-finals of the MAC tournament by ninth-seeded Toledo and seventh-seeded Eastern Michigan. They were joined in the semi-finals by Ohio and Kent State. However, the remainder of the tournament was cancelled due to the concerns over the coronavirus pandemic.

== Preseason Awards ==
The preseason coaches' poll and league awards were announced by the league office on October 30, 2019.

=== Preseason women's basketball coaches poll ===
(First place votes in parentheses)

==== East Division ====
1. Ohio (12) 72
2. Buffalo 56
3. Kent State 50
4. Miami 32
5. Akron 28
6. Bowling Green 14

==== West Division ====
1. Central Michigan 60 (4)
2. Northern Illinois 59 (4)
3. Toledo 50 (2)
4. Eastern Michigan 35 (1)
5. Ball State 30 (1)
6. Western Michigan 18

==== Tournament Champs ====
Ohio (10), Buffalo (1), Northern Illinois (1)

=== Honors ===
Honor	Recipient
Preseason All-MAC East	Erica Johnson, Ohio, R-Sophomore, Forward
Preseason All-MAC East	Summer Hemphill, Buffalo, Senior, Forward
Preseason All-MAC East	Lauren Dickerson, Miami, Senior, Guard
Preseason All-MAC East	Megan Carter, Kent State, R-Senior, Guard
Preseason All-MAC East	CeCe Hooks, Ohio, Junior, Guard
Preseason All-MAC West	Courtney Woods, Northern Illinois, R-Senior, Guard/Forward
Preseason All-MAC West	Micaela Kelly, Central Michigan, Junior, Guard
Preseason All-MAC West	Oshlynn Brown, Ball State, Junior, Forward
Preseason All-MAC West	Corrione Cardwell, Eastern Michigan, R-Junior, Guard
Preseason All-MAC West	Breanna Mobley, Western Michigan, R-Senior, Forward
Preseason All-MAC West	Nakiah Black, Toledo, Junior, Guard

== Postseason ==
=== Postseason Awards ===
1. Coach of the Year: Heather Oesterle, Central Michigan
2. Player of the Year: Micaela Kelly, Central Michigan
3. Freshman of the Year: Dyaisha Fair, Buffalo
4. Defensive Player of the Year: Cece Hooks, Ohio
5. Sixth Man of the Year: Gabrielle Bird, Central Michigan

=== Honors ===
Honor	Recipient
Postseason All-MAC First Team	Oshlynn Brown, Ball State
Postseason All-MAC First Team	Micaela Kelly, Central Michigan
Postseason All-MAC First Team	Courtney Woods, Northern Illinois
Postseason All-MAC First Team	Cece Hooks, Ohio
Postseason All-MAC First Team	Erica Johnson, Ohio
Postseason All-MAC Second Team	Dyaisha Fair, Buffalo
Postseason All-MAC Second Team	Molly Davis, Central Michigan
Postseason All-MAC Second Team	Areanna Combs, Eastern Michigan
Postseason All-MAC Second Team	Peyton Scott, Miami
Postseason All-MAC Second Team	Chelby Koker, NIU
Postseason All-MAC Third Team	Haliegh Reinoehl, Akron
Postseason All-MAC Third Team	Theresa Onwuka, Buffalo
Postseason All-MAC Third Team	Kyra Bussell, Central Michigan
Postseason All-MAC Third Team	Savannah Kluesner, Miami
Postseason All-MAC Third Team	Jordan Walker, Western Michigan
Postseason All-MAC Honorable Mention	Jordyn Dawson, Akron
Postseason All-MAC Honorable Mention	Angela Perry, Bowling Green
Postseason All-MAC Honorable Mention	Megan Carter, Kent State
Postseason All-MAC Honorable Mention	Katie Shumate, Kent State
Postseason All-MAC Honorable Mention	Amani Burke, Ohio
All-MAC Defensive Team	Theresa Onwuka, Buffalo
All-MAC Defensive Team	Micaela Kelly, Central Michigan
All-MAC Defensive Team	Areanna Combs, Eastern Michigan
All-MAC Defensive Team	Lindsey Thall, Kent State
All-MAC Defensive Team	Cece Hooks, Ohio, Sr. Guard
All-MAC Freshman Team	Sydney Freeman, Ball State
All-MAC Freshman Team	Dyaisha Fair, Buffalo
All-MAC Freshman Team	Molly Davis, Central Michigan
All-MAC Freshman Team	Katie Shumate, Kent State
All-MAC Freshman Team	Nila Blackford, Kent State
All-MAC Freshman Team	Peyton Scott, Miami

== See also ==
2019–20 Mid-American Conference men's basketball season
