= Heather Oesterle =

American basketball player and coach (born 1979)

Current position
- Title: Assistant coach
- Team: Stanford
- Conference: ACC

Biographical details
- Born: October 12, 1979 (age 47); Mason, Michigan, U.S.

Playing career
- 1998–2002: Michigan
- Position: Forward/Guard

Coaching career (HC unless noted)
- 2002–2003: Stanford (asst.)
- 2003–2008: Miami (OH) (asst.)
- 2008–2010: Northern Illinois (asst.)
- 2010–2012: Central Michigan (asst.)
- 2012–2019: Central Michigan (AHC)
- 2019–2023: Central Michigan
- 2023–2024: Notre Dame (SPD)
- 2024–present: Stanford (asst.)

Head coaching record
- Overall: 50–63 (.442)

Accomplishments and honors

Championships
- MAC regular season (2020); MAC West Division (2020)

Awards
- MAC Coach of the Year (2020)

Heather Oesterle (born October 12, 1979) is an American former collegiate basketball player who is currently an assistant coach for the Stanford Cardinal women's basketball team. Previously, she was the head coach of the Central Michigan and the strategic program director of Notre Dame women's basketball teams. Oesterle was named CMU's head women's basketball coach in July, 2019, succeeding her long-time mentor Sue Guevara. Oesterle served for nine seasons on Guevara's staff at CMU, helping lead the program to unprecedented heights including three Mid-American Conference championships, two MAC Tournament titles, and five MAC West Division crowns. She earned her bachelor's degree in kinesiology from Michigan in 2002 and her master's degree in sports studies from Miami in 2008.

== Playing career ==
She played four years under head coach Sue Guevara at Michigan from 1998 to 2002.

=== Michigan statistics ===
Legend
GP	Games played	GS	Games started	MPG	Minutes per game
FG%	Field goal percentage	3P%	3-point field goal percentage	FT%	Free throw percentage
RPG	Rebounds per game	APG	Assists per game	SPG	Steals per game
BPG	Blocks per game	PPG	Points per game	**Bold**	Career high

Year	Team	GP	Points	FG%	3P%	FT%	RPG	APG	SPG	BPG	PPG
1998–99	Michigan	21	80	33.3%	14.3%	79.2%	2.2	0.7	0.9	0.1	3.8
1999–00	Michigan	27	111	**42.1%**	**41.4%**	**86.4%**	2.3	1.3	0.5	0.3	4.1
2000–01	Michigan	27	**188**	38.1%	34.0%	70.4%	**4.8**	**2.6**	**1.3**	**0.4**	**7.0**
2001–02	Michigan	27	103	31.9%	22.6%	76.0%	4.0	2.2	1.2	0.2	3.8
Career		102	482	36.5%	28.7%	76.0%	3.4	1.8	1.0	0.3	4.7

== Coaching career ==
Early in her coaching career she was an assistant at Stanford before coming to the MAC as assistant at Miami (OH) and Northern Illinois. She joined Guevara's staff at Central Michigan in 2012 where she remained until Guevara's retirement.

=== Central Michigan ===
On July 12, 2019, Oesterle was announced as the new head coach of the Central Michigan women's basketball program. In her first season the Chippewas won the regular season championship with a 15–1 MAC record. They were upset in the MAC tournament prior to its cancellation due to the COVID-19 pandemic and their hopes in the postseason were dashed by the cancellation of the NCAA tournament In 2021, her team won the MAC tournament with a 77–72 win over Bowling Green. They lost to Iowa in the first round of the NCAA tournament. After seasons with single digit wins in her final two years she was fired April 6, 2023.

=== Notre Dame ===
On September 7, 2023, Oesterle was announced as Notre Dame's strategic program director.

=== Return to Stanford ===
On April 25, 2024, Oesterle returned to Stanford as an assistant coach on Kate Paye's staff.

== Head coaching record ==
=== College ===
Record table
Season	Team	Overall	Conference	Standing	Postseason
Central Michigan Chippewas (Mid-American Conference) (2019–2023)
2019–20	Central Michigan	22–5	15–1	1st (West)	Postseason cancelled due to COVID-19
2020–21	Central Michigan	18–9	13–6	2nd	NCAA first round
2021–22	Central Michigan	4–25	2–18	12th	
2022–23	Central Michigan	6–23	4–14	T–11th	
Central Michigan:		50–62 (.446)	34–39 (.466)		
Total:		50–62 (.446)			
National champion Postseason invitational champion Conference regular season champion Conference regular season and conference tournament champion Division regular season champion Division regular season and conference tournament champion Conference tournament champion
