= 2011–12 Mid-American Conference women's basketball season =

- League: NCAA Division I
- Sport: Basketball
- Teams: 12

Regular season
- Champions: Bowling Green
- Season MVP: Tavelyn James

Tournament
- Champions: Eastern Michigan
- Runners-up: Central Michigan
- Finals MVP: Tavelyn James

Mid-American women's basketball seasons
- ← 2010–11 2012–13 →

2011–12 Mid-American Conference women's basketball standings
	Conf.				Overall
Team	W		L	PCT	W		L	PCT
Bowling Green	14	–	2	.875	24	–	6	.800
Miami (OH)	11	–	5	.688	21	–	9	.700
Akron	7	–	9	.438	14	–	18	.438
Ohio	6	–	10	.375	14	–	18	.438
Kent State	5	–	11	.313	6	–	21	.222
Buffalo	4	–	12	.250	9	–	22	.290
West
Eastern Michigan†	13	–	3	.813	23	–	8	.742
Toledo	13	–	3	.813	21	–	9	.700
Central Michigan	8	–	8	.500	20	–	15	.571
Northern Illinois	6	–	10	.375	14	–	17	.452
Western Michigan	5	–	11	.313	8	–	22	.267
Ball State	4	–	12	.250	9	–	21	.300
† 2012 MAC tournament winner Rankings from AP poll

The 2011–12 Mid-American Conference women's basketball season began with practices in October 2011, followed by the start of the 2011–12 NCAA Division I women's basketball season in November. Conference play began in January 2012 and concluded in March 2012. Bowling Green won the regular season title with a record of 14–2 by one game over Eastern Michigan and Toledo. Tavelyn James of Eastern Michigan was named MAC player of the year.

Third seeded Eastern won the MAC tournament over fifth seeded Central Michigan. Tavelyn James of Eastern Michigan was the tournament MVP. Eastern Michigan lost to South Carolina in the first round of the NCAA tournament. Bowling Green, Central Michigan, Miami, and Toledo played in the WNIT.

== Preseason awards ==
The preseason poll and league awards were announced by the league office on November 1, 2011.

=== Preseason women's basketball poll ===
(First place votes in parentheses)

==== East Division ====
1. Bowling Green
2. Miami
3. Akron
4. Kent State
5. Ohio
6. Buffalo

==== West Division ====
1. Toledo
2. Central Michigan
3. Eastern Michigan
4. Northern Illinois
5. Ball State
6. Western Michigan

==== Tournament champs ====
Toledo

=== Honors ===
Honor	Recipient
Preseason All-MAC East	Rachel Tecca, Akron
Preseason All-MAC East	Chrissy Steffen, Bowling Green
Preseason All-MAC East	Courtney Osborn, Miami
Preseason All-MAC East	Kirsten Olowinski, Miami
Preseason All-MAC East	Tenishia Benson, Ohio
Preseason All-MAC West	Brandi Baker, Central Michigan
Preseason All-MAC West	Niki DiGuilio, Central Michigan
Preseason All-MAC West	Tavelyn James, Eastern Michigan
Preseason All-MAC West	Naama Shafir, Toledo
Preseason All-MAC West	Miame Giden, Western Michigan

== Postseason ==
=== Postseason awards ===
1. Coach of the Year: Curt Miller, Bowling Green
2. Player of the Year: Tavelyn James, Eastern Michigan
3. Freshman of the Year: Claire Jakubicek, Northern Illinois
4. Defensive Player of the Year: Andola Dortch, Toledo
5. Sixth Man of the Year: Jalisa Olive, Central Michigan

=== Honors ===
Honor	Recipient
Postseason All-MAC First Team	Alexis Rogers, Bowling Green, Forward
Postseason All-MAC First Team	Brittany Hedderson, Buffalo, Guard
Postseason All-MAC First Team	Tavelyn James, Eastern Michigan, Guard
Postseason All-MAC First Team	Courtney Osborn, Miami, Guard
Postseason All-MAC First Team	Tenishia Benson, Ohio, Guard
Postseason All-MAC Second Team	Sina King, Akron, Forward
Postseason All-MAC Second Team	Jessica Slagle, Bowling Green, Point Guard
Postseason All-MAC Second Team	Chrissy Steffen, Bowling Green, Guard
Postseason All-MAC Second Team	Andola Dortch, Toledo, Guard
Postseason All-MAC Second Team	Yolanda Richardson, Toledo Center
Postseason All-MAC Third Team	Paige Redditt, Eastern Michigan, Guard
Postseason All-MAC Third Team	Natachia Watkins, Eastern Michigan, Guard
Postseason All-MAC Third Team	Kirsten Olowinski, Miami, Forward
Postseason All-MAC Third Team	Maggie Boyer, Miami, Guard
Postseason All-MAC Third Team	Courtney Ingersoll, Toledo, Guard
Postseason All-MAC Honorable Mention	Taylor Ruper, Akron, Guard
Postseason All-MAC Honorable Mention	Taylor Johnson, Central Michigan, Forward
Postseason All-MAC Honorable Mention	Crystal Bradford, Central Michigan, Guard/Forward
Postseason All-MAC Honorable Mention	Diamon Beckford, Kent State, Forward
Postseason All-MAC Honorable Mention	Marquisha Harris, Western Michigan, F
All-MAC Freshman Team	Jasmine Matthews, Bowling Green, Guard
All-MAC Freshman Team	Crystal Bradford, Central Michigan, Guard/Forward
All-MAC Freshman Team	Jessica Green, Central Michigan, Guard
All-MAC Freshman Team	Jasmine Bracey, Central Michigan, Center
All-MAC Freshman Team	Claire Jakubicek, Northern Illinois, Forward

== See also ==
2011–12 Mid-American Conference men's basketball season
