= 2012 MAC women's basketball tournament =

- Classification: Division I
- Teams: 12
- Site: Quicken Loans Arena; Cleveland, Ohio
- Champions: Eastern Michigan
- Winning coach: AnnMarie Gilbert
- MVP: Tavelyn James (Eastern Michigan)
- MAC women's basketball tournaments

2011–12 Mid-American Conference women's basketball standings
	Conf.				Overall
Team	W		L	PCT	W		L	PCT
Bowling Green	14	–	2	.875	24	–	6	.800
Miami (OH)	11	–	5	.688	21	–	9	.700
Akron	7	–	9	.438	14	–	18	.438
Ohio	6	–	10	.375	14	–	18	.438
Kent State	5	–	11	.313	6	–	21	.222
Buffalo	4	–	12	.250	9	–	22	.290
West
Eastern Michigan†	13	–	3	.813	23	–	8	.742
Toledo	13	–	3	.813	21	–	9	.700
Central Michigan	8	–	8	.500	20	–	15	.571
Northern Illinois	6	–	10	.375	14	–	17	.452
Western Michigan	5	–	11	.313	8	–	22	.267
Ball State	4	–	12	.250	9	–	21	.300
† 2012 MAC tournament winner Rankings from AP poll

The 2012 Mid-American Conference women's basketball tournament was the post-season basketball tournament for the Mid-American Conference (MAC) 2011–12 college basketball season. The 2012 tournament was held March 3–10, 2012. Second seeded Eastern Michigan won the championship over fifth seeded Central Michigan. Tavelyn James of Eastern Michigan was the MVP.

== Format ==
First round games were held on campus sites at the higher seed on March 3. The remaining rounds were held at Quicken Loans Arena, between March 7–10. The top two seeds received byes into the semifinals, with the three and four seeds receiving a bye to the quarterfinals.

== Seeds ==
Seed	School	Conference record	Division
1#	Bowling Green	14–2	East
2#	Eastern Michigan	13–3	West
3†	Toledo	13–3	West
4†	Miami	11–5	East
5	Central Michigan	8–8	East
6	Akron	7–9	East
7	Northern Illinois	6–10	West
8	Ohio	6–10	East
9	Kent State	5–11	West
10	Western Michigan	5–11	West
11	Buffalo	4–12	East
12	Ball State	4–12	West
† – Received a Bye to quarterfinals. # - Received a bye to the semifinals Overall record are as of the end of the regular season.

== Bracket ==
First round Saturday, March 3
5	Central Michigan	86
12	Ball State	62
8	Ohio	58
9	Kent State	40
6	Akron	96
11	Buffalo	82
7	Northern Illinois	68
10	Western Michigan	51

Second round Wednesday, March 7
1	Bowling Green
(bye)
4	Miami
(bye)
5	Central Michigan	58
8	Ohio	55
2	Ball State
(bye)
3	Toledo
(bye)
6	Akron	60
7	Northern Illinois	61

Quarterfinals; Thursday, March 9
1	Bowling Green
(bye)
4	Miami	64
5	Central Michigan	78
2	Eastern Michigan
(bye)
3	Toledo	72
6	Northern Illinois	62

Semifinals; Friday, March 9
1	Bowling Green	66
4	Central Michigan	69
2	Eastern Michigan	59
3	Toledo	57

Championship; Saturday, March 10
5	Central Michigan	71
3	Eastern Michigan	72

== All-Tournament Team ==
Tournament MVP – Tavelyn James, Bowling Green

Player	Team
Taylor Johnson	Central Michigan
Crystal Bradford	Central Michigan
Jas'Mine Bracey	Central Michigan
Natachia Watkins	Eastern Michigan
Tavelyn James	Eastern Michigan
