= 2020–21 Mid-American Conference women's basketball season =

- League: NCAA Division I
- Sport: Basketball
- Teams: 12

Regular season
- Champions: Bowling Green
- Runners-up: Central Michigan
- Season MVP: CeCe Hooks

Tournament
- Champions: Central Michigan
- Runners-up: Bowling Green
- Finals MVP: Micaela Kelly

Mid-American women's basketball seasons
- ← 2019–20 2021–22 →

2020–21 Mid-American Conference women's basketball standings
	Conf.				Overall
Team	W		L	PCT	W		L	PCT
Bowling Green	14	–	4	.778	20	–	5	.800
Central Michigan†	13	–	6	.684	17	–	8	.680
Ohio	11	–	6	.647	14	–	8	.636
Buffalo	11	–	6	.647	15	–	9	.625
Kent State	10	–	6	.625	11	–	9	.550
Ball State	12	–	8	.600	14	–	11	.560
Northern Illinois	10	–	8	.556	12	–	12	.500
Eastern Michigan	7	–	7	.500	10	–	10	.500
Toledo	8	–	12	.400	12	–	12	.500
Western Michigan	5	–	14	.263	6	–	15	.286
Akron	4	–	14	.222	7	–	14	.333
Miami (OH)	3	–	17	.150	4	–	20	.167
† 2021 MAC tournament winner As of July 7, 2024; Rankings from AP poll

The 2020–21 Mid-American Conference women's basketball season began with practices in October 2020, followed by the start of the 2020–21 NCAA Division I women's basketball season in November. Conference play began in January 2021 and concluded in March 2021. In a season limited due to the ongoing COVID-19 pandemic, Bowling Green won the MAC regular season championship with a conference record of 14–4. Ohio's Cece Hooks was named MAC player of the year. Second seeded Central Michigan won the MAC tournament with a 77–72 win over Bowling Green. Micaela Kelly was named the tournament MVP. With the automatic bid, Central Michigan was the only MAC school to qualify for the NCAA tournament where they lost to Iowa in the first round. Bowling Green and Ohio accepted bids to the WNIT. Both lost in the first round.

== Preseason Awards ==
The preseason coaches' poll and league awards were announced by the league office on November 19, 2020.

=== Preseason women's basketball coaches poll ===
(First place votes in parentheses)

1. Central Michigan (10) 142
2. Ohio 128
3. Ball State (1) 119
4. Buffalo (1) 108
5. Eastern Michigan 94
6. Kent State 88
7. Toledo 71
8. Northern Illinois 42
9. Miami 41
10. Akron 39
11. Bowling Green 38
12. Western Michigan 28

Tournament Champion: Central Michigan (6), Ohio (3), Buffalo (1), Ball State (1), EMU (1)

=== Honors ===
Honor	Recipient
Preseason All-MAC First Team	Oshlynn Brown, Ball State
Preseason All-MAC First Team	Dyaisha Fair, Buffalo
Preseason All-MAC First Team	Micaela Kelly, Central Michigan
Preseason All-MAC First Team	Cece Hooks, Ohio
Preseason All-MAC First Team	Erica Johnson, Ohio
Preseason All-MAC Second Team	Jordyn Dawson, Akron
Preseason All-MAC Second Team	Summer Hemphill, Buffalo
Preseason All-MAC Second Team	Molly Davis, Central Michigan
Preseason All-MAC Second Team	Kyra Bussell, Central Michigan
Preseason All-MAC Second Team	Areanna Combs, Eastern Michigan

== Postseason ==
=== Postseason Awards ===
1. Coach of the Year: Robyn Fralick, Bowling Green
2. Player of the Year: Cece Hooks, Ohio
3. Freshman of the Year: Lexi Fleming, Bowling Green
4. Defensive Player of the Year: Cece Hooks, Ohio
5. Sixth Player of the Year: Janae Poisson, NIU

=== Honors ===
Honor	Recipient
Postseason All-MAC First Team	Oshlynn Brown, Ball State
Postseason All-MAC First Team	Dyaisha Fair, Buffalo
Postseason All-MAC First Team	Micaela Kelly, Central Michigan
Postseason All-MAC First Team	Molly Davis, Central Michigan
Postseason All-MAC First Team	Cece Hooks, Ohio
Postseason All-MAC Second Team	Lexi Fleming, Bowling Green
Postseason All-MAC Second Team	Areanna Combs, Eastern Michigan
Postseason All-MAC Second Team	Nila Blackford, Kent State
Postseason All-MAC Second Team	Peyton Scott, Miami
Postseason All-MAC Second Team	Chelby Koker, NIU
Postseason All-MAC Third Team	Jordyn Dawson, Akron
Postseason All-MAC Third Team	Kadie Hempfling, Bowling Green
Postseason All-MAC Third Team	Ce'Nara Skanes, Eastern Michigan
Postseason All-MAC Third Team	Erica Johnson, Ohio
Postseason All-MAC Third Team	Quinesha Lockett, Toledo
Postseason All-MAC Honorable Mention	Sydney Freeman, Ball State
Postseason All-MAC Honorable Mention	Katie Shumate, Kent State
Postseason All-MAC Honorable Mention	Lindsey Thall, Kent State
Postseason All-MAC Honorable Mention	Gabby Burris, Ohio
Postseason All-MAC Honorable Mention	Reilly Jacobson, Western Michigan
Postseason All-MAC Honorable Mention	Taylor Williams, Western Michigan
All-MAC Defensive Team	Nyla Hampton, Bowling Green
All-MAC Defensive Team	Dyaisha Fair, Buffalo
All-MAC Defensive Team	Micaela Kelly, Central Michigan
All-MAC Defensive Team	Areanna Combs, Eastern Michigan
All-MAC Defensive Team	Lindsey Thall, Kent State
All-MAC Defensive Team	Cece Hooks, Ohio Sr. Guard
All-MAC Freshman Team	Lexi Fleming, Bowling Green
All-MAC Freshman Team	Nyla Hampton, Bowling Green
All-MAC Freshman Team	Cheyenne McEvans, Buffalo
All-MAC Freshman Team	Madi Mace, Ohio
All-MAC Freshman Team	Taylor Williams, Western Michigan, Toledo

== See also ==
2020–21 Mid-American Conference men's basketball season
