= 2011–12 Ohio Bobcats women's basketball team =

Intercollegiate basketball season

2011–12 Ohio Bobcats women's basketball
- Conference: Mid-American Conference
- East Division
- Record: 14–18 (6–10 MAC)
- Head coach: Semeka Randall (4th season)
- Assistant coach: Skyler Young
- Home arena: Convocation Center

2011–12 Mid-American Conference women's basketball standings
	Conf.				Overall
Team	W		L	PCT	W		L	PCT
Bowling Green	14	–	2	.875	24	–	6	.800
Miami (OH)	11	–	5	.688	21	–	9	.700
Akron	7	–	9	.438	14	–	18	.438
Ohio	6	–	10	.375	14	–	18	.438
Kent State	5	–	11	.313	6	–	21	.222
Buffalo	4	–	12	.250	9	–	22	.290
West
Eastern Michigan†	13	–	3	.813	23	–	8	.742
Toledo	13	–	3	.813	21	–	9	.700
Central Michigan	8	–	8	.500	20	–	15	.571
Northern Illinois	6	–	10	.375	14	–	17	.452
Western Michigan	5	–	11	.313	8	–	22	.267
Ball State	4	–	12	.250	9	–	21	.300
† 2012 MAC tournament winner Rankings from AP poll

The 2011–12 Ohio Bobcats women's basketball team represented Ohio University during the 2011–12 NCAA Division I women's basketball season. The Bobcats, led by fourth year head coach Semeka Randall, played their home games at the Convocation Center in Athens, Ohio as a member of the Mid-American Conference. They finished the season 14–18 and 6–10 in MAC play.

== Preseason ==
The preseason poll and league awards were announced by the league office on November 1, 2011. Ohio was picked fifth in the MAC East.

=== Preseason women's basketball poll ===
(First place votes in parentheses)

==== East Division ====
1. Bowling Green
2. Miami
3. Akron
4. Kent State
5. Ohio
6. Buffalo

==== West Division ====
1. Toledo
2. Central Michigan
3. Eastern Michigan
4. Northern Illinois
5. Ball State
6. Western Michigan

==== Tournament champs ====
Toledo

=== Preseason All-MAC ===
Preseason All-MAC teams
Team	Player	Position	Year
Preseason All-MAC East	Tenishia Benson	G	Sr.

== Schedule ==
Date time, TV	Rank^{#}	Opponent^{#}	Result	Record	Site (attendance) city, state
Non-conference regular season
Nov 13, 2011*		at Morehead State	L 57–62	0–1	
Nov 19, 2011*		Marshall	W 68–56	1–1	
Nov 23, 2011*		Belmont	W 65–51	2–1	
Nov 26, 2011*		Chicago State	W 65–37	3–1	
Nov 30, 2011*		UNC Wilmington	L 51–56	3–2	
Dec 3, 2011*		at Duquesne	L 60–83	3–3	
Dec 5, 2011*		at Cleveland State	L 56–66	3–4	
Dec 9, 2011*		Youngstown State	L 47–55	3–5	
Dec 11, 2011*		San Francisco	W 63–53	4–5	
Dec 13, 2011*		Niagara	W 50–40	5–5	
Dec 18, 2011*		vs. Oklahoma	L 57–89	5–6	
Dec 19, 2011*		vs. Xavier	W 80–75 ^{2OT}	6–6	
Dec 20, 2011*		vs. Syracuse	L 70–81	6–7	
Dec 29, 2011*		George Mason	W 75–59	7–7	
MAC regular season
Jan 4, 2012		Buffalo	W 73–64	8–7 (1–0)	
Jan 7, 2012		at Kent State	L 65–68	8–8 (1–1)	
Jan 12, 2012		at Bowling Green	L 49–61	8–9 (1–2)	
Jan 15, 2012		Miami (OH)	L 47–67	8–10 (1–3)	
Jan 19, 2012		Akron	W 72–71 ^{OT}	9–10 (2–3)	
Jan 22, 2012		Toledo	L 33–52	9–11 (2–4)	
Jan 25, 2012		at Central Michigan	L 53–67	9–12 (2–5)	
Jan 28, 2012		at Western Michigan	W 72–59	10–12 (3–5)	
Feb 1, 2012		Eastern Michigan	L 53–63	10–13 (3–6)	
Feb 4, 2012		at Northern Illinois	L 46–50	10–14 (3–7)	
Feb 11, 2012		Ball State	W 76–57	11–14 (4–7)	
Feb 14, 2012		at Akron	L 65–71	11–15 (4–8)	
Feb 18, 2012		Kent State	W 51–45	12–15 (5–8)	
Feb 22, 2012		Bowling Green	W 60–56	13–15 (6–8)	
Feb 25, 2012		at Buffalo	L 56–61	13–16 (6–9)	
Feb 28, 2012		at Miami (OH)	L 49–51	13–17 (6–10)	
MAC Tournament
Mar 3, 2012		Kent State	W 58–40	14–17	
Mar 7, 2012		vs. Central Michigan	L 55–58	14–18	
*Non-conference game. ^{#}Rankings from AP Poll. (#) Tournament seedings in parentheses. All times are in Eastern Time.

== Awards and honors ==
=== All-MAC Awards ===
Postseason All-MAC teams
Team	Player	Position	Year
All-MAC 1st team	Tenishia Benson	G	Sr.
