= 2019–20 Ball State Cardinals women's basketball team =

Intercollegiate basketball season

2019–20 Ball State Cardinals women's basketball
- Conference: Mid-American Conference
- West Division
- Record: 21–10 (13–5 MAC)
- Head coach: Brady Sallee (8th season)
- Assistant coaches: Audrey McDonald-Spencer; Ryan Patterson; Bri Kulas
- Home arena: Worthen Arena

2019–20 Mid-American Conference women's basketball standings
| | Conf. | | | | Overall |
| Team | W | | L | PCT | W | | L | PCT |
|---|---|---|---|---|---|---|---|---|
East
| Kent State | 11 | – | 7 | .611 | 19 | – | 11 | .633 |
| Ohio | 11 | – | 7 | .611 | 19 | – | 11 | .633 |
| Buffalo | 9 | – | 9 | .500 | 19 | – | 12 | .613 |
| Akron | 8 | – | 10 | .444 | 15 | – | 15 | .500 |
| Miami (OH) | 4 | – | 14 | .222 | 11 | – | 20 | .355 |
| Bowling Green | 3 | – | 15 | .167 | 10 | – | 21 | .323 |
West
| Central Michigan | 16 | – | 2 | .889 | 23 | – | 7 | .767 |
| Ball State | 13 | – | 5 | .722 | 21 | – | 10 | .677 |
| Western Michigan | 10 | – | 8 | .556 | 18 | – | 13 | .581 |
| Eastern Michigan | 9 | – | 9 | .500 | 16 | – | 15 | .516 |
| Toledo | 7 | – | 11 | .389 | 14 | – | 17 | .452 |
| Northern Illinois | 7 | – | 11 | .389 | 11 | – | 19 | .367 |
† 2020 MAC tournament winner Rankings from AP poll

The 2019–20 Ball State Cardinals women's basketball team represented Ball State University during the 2019–20 NCAA Division I women's basketball season. The Cardinals, led by eighth-year head coach Brady Sallee, played their home games at Worthen Arena as members of the West Division of the Mid-American Conference.

== Roster ==
2019–20 Ball State Cardinals women's basketball team
Players
Coaches

| Pos. | # | Name | Height | Year | Previous school | Hometown |
|---|---|---|---|---|---|---|
| G | 0 | Arbrie Benson | 5 ft 10 in (1.78 m) | Sr | Omaha Benson | Chicago, IL |
| G | 1 | Abi Haynes | 5 ft 6 in (1.68 m) | So | Lincoln | Vincennes, IN |
| G | 2 | Katie Helgason | 5 ft 7 in (1.7 m) | Jr | Greenfield Central | Greenfield, IN |
| G | 5 | Maliah Howard-Bass | 5 ft 9 in (1.75 m) | Jr | Columbus North | Columbus, IN |
| F | 10 | Thelma Dís Ágústsdóttir | 6 ft 0 in (1.83 m) | So | Keflavík | Reykjanesbær, Iceland |
| G | 11 | Sydney Freeman | 5 ft 8 in (1.73 m) | Fr | Central Noble | Albion, IN |
| F | 13 | Anna Gamarra | 6 ft 3 in (1.91 m) | Fr | Segle XXI | Barcelona, Spain |
| F | 21 | Blake Smith | 6 ft 3 in (1.91 m) | So | Carmel | Carmel, IN |
| G | 22 | Estel Puiggros | 5 ft 9 in (1.75 m) | Fr | Segle XXI | Manresa, Spain |
| G | 23 | Gabby Smith | 5 ft 9 in (1.75 m) | So | Bolingbrook | Bolingbrook, IL |
| G | 24 | Jasmin Samz | 5 ft 9 in (1.75 m) | GS | Wausaw | Wausau, WI |
| G | 30 | Anna Clephane | 5 ft 10 in (1.78 m) | RS Fr | Scott | Taylor Mill, KY |
| F | 32 | Oshlyn Brown | 6 ft 1 in (1.85 m) | Jr | Chillicothe | Chillicothe, OH |
| F | 34 | Aliyah Walker | 5 ft 11 in (1.8 m) | Jr | Brownsburg | Indianapolis, IN |
| F | 42 | Annie Rauch | 6 ft 3 in (1.91 m) | Fr | Hilliard Darby | Hilliar, OH |

Head coach

- Brady Sallee (Thomas More)

Assistant coach(es)

- Audrey McDonald-Spencer (Ball State)
- Ryan Patterson (Malone)
- Bri Kulas (Missouri)

Legend

- (C) Team captain
- (S) Suspended
- (I) Ineligible
- (W) Walk-on
- Injured
- Current redshirt

Roster

== Schedule ==
| Date time, TV | Rank^{#} | Opponent^{#} | Result | Record | Site (attendance) city, state |
Non-conference regular season
| November 5, 2019*; 7:00 pm, ESPN3 | | at IUPUI | L 48–65 | 0–1 | IUPUI Gymnasium (612); Indianapolis, IN |
| November 12, 2019*; 7:00 pm, YouTube | | at Purdue Fort Wayne | W 83–52 | 1–1 | Hilliard Gates Sports Center (559); Fort Wayne, IN |
| November 16, 2019*; 2:00 pm, Bearcats TV | | at Cincinnati | L 56–63 | 1–2 | Fifth Third Arena (960); Cincinnati, OH |
| November 20, 2019*; 2:00 pm, ESPN+ | | Xavier | W 70–49 | 2–2 | Worthen Arena (4,235); Muncie, IN |
| November 23, 2019*; 1:00 pm, ESPN3 | | Butler | W 74–70 | 3–2 | Worthen Arena (4,192); Muncie, IN |
| November 28, 2019*; 4:00 pm | | vs. Lehigh; Women's Basketball Bahamas Hoopfest Thanksgiving Classic | W 54–52 | 4–2 | Baha Mar Convention, Arts & Entertainment Center; Nassau, Bahamas |
| November 29, 2019*; 7:00 pm | | vs. Wisconsin; Women's Basketball Bahamas Hoopfest Thanksgiving Classic | L 56–67 | 4–3 | Baha Mar Convention, Arts & Entertainment Center (200); Nassau, Bahamas |
| December 7, 2019*; 3:30 pm, ESPN+ | | Western Kentucky | L 86–91 ^{OT} | 4–4 | Worthen Arena (4,733); Muncie, IN |
| December 18, 2019*; 6:30 pm | | vs. Loyola Marymount; Lobo Invitational | W 77–72 | 5–4 | Dreamstyle Arena; Alburqueque, NM |
| December 19, 2019*; 7:00 pm | | vs. Providence; Lobo Invitational | W 52–51 | 6–4 | Dreamstyle Arena; Albuquerque, NM |
| December 20, 2019*; 9:00 pm, Mountain West Network | | at New Mexico; Lobo Invitational | W 70–57 | 7–4 | Dreamstyle Arena (4,728); Albuquerque, NM |
| December 30, 2019*; 7:00 pm, ESPN3 | | Urbana | W 84–49 | 8–4 | Worthen Arena (947); Muncie, IN |
MAC regular season
| January 4, 2020; 1:00 pm, ESPN+ | | Kent State | W 66–62 | 9–4 (1–0) | Worthen Arena (1,105); Muncie, IN |
| January 8, 2020; 7:00 pm, ESPN+ | | at Bowling Green | W 86–80 ^{OT} | 10–4 (2–0) | Stroh Center (1,172); Bowling Green, OH |
| January 11, 2020; 1:00 pm, ESPN3 | | Eastern Michigan | W 59–54 | 11–4 (3–0) | Worthen Arena (1,228); Muncie, IN |
| January 15, 2020; 7:00 pm, ESPN+ | | at Central Michigan | L 39–66 | 11–5 (3–1) | McGuirk Arena; Mount Pleasant, MI |
| January 18, 2020; 1:00 pm, ESPN+ | | at Ohio | L 71–79 | 11–6 (3–2) | Convocation Center (541); Athens, OH |
| January 22, 2020; 1:00 pm, ESPN+ | | Buffalo | W 69–65 | 12–6 (4–2) | Worthen Arena (1,010); Muncie, IN |
| January 25, 2020; 1:00 pm, ESPN3 | | Miami (OH) | W 80–63 | 13–6 (5–2) | Worthen Arena (1,315); Muncie, IN |
| January 29, 2020; 7:00 pm, ESPN+ | | at Kent State | L 68–69 | 13–7 (5–3) | Memorial Athletic and Convocation Center (1,521); Kent, OH |
| February 1, 2020; 3:30 pm, ESPN3 | | Western Michigan | W 68–65 | 14–7 (6–3) | Worthen Arena (5,238); Muncie, IN |
| February 8, 2020; 1:00 pm, ESPN+ | | Akron | W 60–52 | 15–7 (7–3) | Worthen Arena (1,002); Muncie, IN |
| February 12, 2020; 7:00 pm, ESPN+ | | at Toledo | W 60–58 | 16–7 (8–3) | Savage Arena (3,179); Toledo, OH |
| February 15, 2020; 2:00 pm, ESPN3 | | at Buffalo | W 69–58 | 17–7 (9–3) | Alumni Arena (1,415); Buffalo, NY |
| February 19, 2020; 7:00 pm, ESPN+ | | Northern Illinois | W 97–89 | 18–7 (10–3) | Worthen Arena (1,334); Muncie, IN |
| February 22, 2020; 12:00 pm, ESPN+ | | at Eastern Michigan | L 58–61 | 18–8 (10–4) | Convocation Center (966); Ypsilanti, MI |
| February 26, 2020; 7:00 pm, ESPN3 | | Toledo | W 66–60 | 19–8 (11–4) | Worthen Arena (875); Muncie, IN |
| February 29, 2020; 1:00 pm, ESPN3 | | Central Michigan | W 67–62 | 20–8 (12–4) | Worthen Arena (1,812); Muncie, IN |
| March 4, 2020; 7:00 pm, ESPN+ | | at Northern Illinois | L 62–70 | 20–9 (12–5) | Convocation Center (564); DeKalb, IL |
| March 7, 2020; 2:00 pm, ESPN3 | | at Western Michigan | W 64–63 ^{OT} | 21–9 (13–5) | University Arena (825); Kalamazoo, MI |
MAC Women's Tournament
| Mar 7, 2020 approx. 5:00 pm, ESPN+ | (2) | vs. (7) Eastern Michigan; Quarterfinals | L 63–64 | 21–10 | Rocket Mortgage FieldHouse (960); Cleveland, OH |
*Non-conference game. ^{#}Rankings from AP Poll. (#) Tournament seedings in parentheses. All times are in Eastern Time.

== See also ==
- 2019–20 Ball State Cardinals men's basketball team
