= 2019–20 Ohio Bobcats women's basketball team =

Intercollegiate basketball season

2019–20 Ohio Bobcats women's basketball
- Conference: Mid-American Conference
- East Division
- Record: 19–11 (11–7 MAC)
- Head coach: Bob Boldon (7th season)
- Assistant coaches: Tavares Jackson; Steph Haas; Marwan Miller
- Home arena: Convocation Center

2019–20 Mid-American Conference women's basketball standings
	Conf.				Overall
Team	W		L	PCT	W		L	PCT
East
Kent State	11	–	7	.611	19	–	11	.633
Ohio	11	–	7	.611	19	–	11	.633
Buffalo	9	–	9	.500	19	–	12	.613
Akron	8	–	10	.444	15	–	15	.500
Miami (OH)	4	–	14	.222	11	–	20	.355
Bowling Green	3	–	15	.167	10	–	21	.323
West
Central Michigan	16	–	2	.889	23	–	7	.767
Ball State	13	–	5	.722	21	–	10	.677
Western Michigan	10	–	8	.556	18	–	13	.581
Eastern Michigan	9	–	9	.500	16	–	15	.516
Toledo	7	–	11	.389	14	–	17	.452
Northern Illinois	7	–	11	.389	11	–	19	.367
† 2020 MAC tournament winner Rankings from AP poll

The 2019–20 Ohio Bobcats women's basketball team represented Ohio University during the 2019–20 NCAA Division I women's basketball season. The Bobcats, led by seventh-year head coach Bob Boldon, played their home games at the Convocation Center in Athens, Ohio as a member of the Mid-American Conference (MAC).

They finished the season 19–11, 11–7 in MAC play. They advanced to the semifinal game of the MAC women's tournament before the tournament was cancelled due to the start of the COVID-19 pandemic.

== Offseason ==
=== Departures ===
Departures
Name	Number	Pos.	Height	Year	Hometown	Reason
Dominique Doseck	10	G	5' 8"	Senior	Athens, OH	Graduated, exhausted eligibility
Olivia Bower	13	F	6' 1"	Senior	Bowerston, OH	Graduated, exhausted eligibility
Hannah Thome	21	F	6' 1"	RS-Junior	Chagrin Falls, OH	Graduated
Kendall Jessing	54	F	6' 0"	Senior	Sylvania, OH	Graduated, exhausted eligibility

=== Incoming transfers ===
Incoming transfers
Name	Number	Pos.	Height	Year	Hometown	Reason
Maddie Bazelak	22	G	6' 0"	Redshirt Senior	Kettering, OH	Transferred from Duquesne (volleyball). Will have one year of eligibility remaining
Jasmine Hale	23	G	5' 8"	Sophomore	Cincinnati, OH	Transferred from Wisconsin. Will have three years of eligibility remaining

=== 2019 recruiting class ===
Recruiting class
Name	Number	Pos.	Height	High school	Hometown
Ella Pope	44	F	5' 11"	Timpview	Orem, UT
Peyton Guice	11	F	5' 11"	Westerville South	Westerville, OH
Madi Mace	33	G	5' 11"	Parkersburg	Parkersburg, WV

== Preseason ==
The preseason coaches' poll and league awards were announced by the league office on October 30, 2019. Ohio was unanimously picked to finish first in the MAC East.

=== Preseason women's basketball coaches poll ===
(First-place votes in parentheses)

==== East Division ====
1. Ohio (12) 72
2. Buffalo 56
3. Kent State 50
4. Miami 32
5. Akron 28
6. Bowling Green 14

==== West Division ====
1. Central Michigan 60 (4)
2. Northern Illinois 59 (4)
3. Toledo 50 (2)
4. Eastern Michigan 35 (1)
5. Ball State 30 (1)
6. Western Michigan 18

==== Tournament Champs ====
Ohio (10), Buffalo (1), Northern Illinois (1)

=== Preseason All-MAC ===
Preseason All-MAC teams
Team	Player	Position	Year
Preseason All-MAC East	Cece Hooks	G	Jr.
Preseason All-MAC East	Erica Johnson	G	R-So.

=== Award watch lists ===
Preseason award honors
Honors	Player	Position	Year	Source
Nancy Lieberman Award	Cece Hooks	G	Jr.	

== Roster ==
2019–20 Ohio Bobcats women's basketball team
Players
Coaches

Pos.	#	Name	Height	Year	Previous school	Hometown
G	1	Cece Hooks	5 ft 8 in (1.73 m)	Jr	Thurgood Marshall	Dayton, OH
G	2	Katie Barker	5 ft 10 in (1.78 m)	RS Jr	Cary-Grove	Cary, IL
G	3	Amani Burke	5 ft 9 in (1.75 m)	RS Sr	Eastmoor Academy	Columbus, OH
G	4	Erica Johnson	5 ft 11 in (1.8 m)	RS So	Mansfield Senior	Mansfield, OH
G	5	Caitlyn Kroll	5 ft 10 in (1.78 m)	RS So	Bridgeport; Saint Francis (PA)	Bridgeport, OH
G	13	Kaylee Bambule	5 ft 8 in (1.73 m)	RS So	Montini Catholic	Plainfield, IL
F	20	Abby Garnett	6 ft 1 in (1.85 m)	RS Fr	Golden	Golden, CO
G	25	Hunter Rogan (W)	5 ft 8 in (1.73 m)	Jr	Urbana	Urbana, OH
F	32	Deesh Beck	5 ft 9 in (1.75 m)	So	Grand Rapids Christian	Grand Rapids, MI
F	35	Alexandra Antonova	6 ft 2 in (1.88 m)	RS Fr	Teays Valley	Moscow, Russia
G	22	Maddie Bazelak	6 ft 0 in (1.83 m)	RS Sr	Teays Valley	Kettering, OH
G	23	Jasmine Hale	5 ft 8 in (1.73 m)	So	West Clemont	Cincinnati, OH
F	41	Gabby Burris	5 ft 11 in (1.8 m)	Jr	Liberty Union	Baltimore, OH
F	44	Ella Pope	5 ft 11 in (1.8 m)	Fr	Timpview	Orem, UT
G	11	Peyton Guice	5 ft 11 in (1.8 m)	Fr	Westerville South	Westerville, OH
G	33	Madi Mace	5 ft 11 in (1.8 m)	Fr	Parkersburg	Parkersburg, WV

Head coach

- Bob Boldon (Walsh)

Assistant coach(es)

- Tavares Jackson (Minnesota)
- Steph Haas (Florida Gulf Coast)
- Marwan Miller (Franklin (OH))

Legend

- (C) Team captain
- (S) Suspended
- (I) Ineligible
- (W) Walk-on
- Injured
- Current redshirt

Roster
Last update: February 13, 2025

== Schedule ==
Date time, TV	Rank^{#}	Opponent^{#}	Result	Record	Site (attendance) city, state
Exhibition
November 2, 2019*; 3:30 p.m.		Walsh	W 83–77		Convocation Center; Athens, OH
Non-conference regular season
November 5, 2019*; 8:00 p.m., ACCNX		at No. 21 Syracuse	L 54–66	0–1	Carrier Dome (1,297); Syracuse, NY
November 10, 2019*; 1:00 p.m.		American	W 81–69	1–1	Convocation Center (451); Athens, OH
November 13, 2019*; 7:00 p.m., ESPN+		Marshall	W 67–51	2–1	Convocation Center (552); Athens, OH
November 17, 2019*; 2:00 p.m.		at Ohio State	W 74–68	3–1	Value City Arena (5,213); Columbus, OH
November 23, 2019*; 1:00 p.m.		Incarnate Word	W 78–42	4–1	Convocation Center (572); Athens, OH
November 18, 2018*; 1:00 p.m.		vs. Pittsburgh	W 72–50	5–1	Ocean Center (263); Daytona Beach, FL
November 30, 2019*; 11:00 a.m.		vs. Butler	L 55–60	5–2	Ocean Center (125); Daytona Beach, FL
December 7, 2019*; 1:00 p.m., HFTV		IUPUI	W 70–64	6–2	Convocation Center (384); Athens, OH
December 15, 2019*; 2:00 p.m., HFTV		at TCU	L 72–79	6–3	Schollmaier Arena (1730); Fort Worth, TX
December 18, 2019*; 7:00 p.m., LHN		at Texas	L 60–73	6–4	Frank Erwin Center (3,012); Austin, TX
December 29, 2019*; 4:00 p.m.		at Chattanooga	W 70–58	7–4	McKenzie Arena (2,350); Chattanooga, TN
MAC regular season
January 4, 2020; 1:00 p.m.		Northern Illinois	W 87–67	8–4 (1–0)	Convocation Center (448); Athens, OH
January 8, 2020; 7:00 p.m.		Central Michigan	L 71–73	8–5 (1–1)	Convocation Center (640); Athens, OH
January 11, 2020; 2:00 p.m.		at Buffalo	W 76–65	9–5 (2–1)	Alumni Arena (2,634); Amherst, NY
January 15, 2020; 7:00 p.m.		at Western Michigan	L 72–73	9–6 (2–2)	University Arena (650); Kalamazoo, MI
January 18, 2020; 1:00 p.m.		Ball State	W 79–71	10–6 (3–2)	Convocation Center (541); Athens, OH
January 22, 2020; 6:00 p.m.		at Northern Illinois	W 85–79	11–6 (4–2)	Convocation Center (350); DeKalb, IL
January 25, 2020; 1:00 p.m.		Bowling Green	W 79–69	12–6 (5–2)	Convocation Center (980); Athens, OH
January 29, 2020; 7:00 p.m.		Akron	W 70–57	13–6 (6–2)	Convocation Center (556); Athens, OH
February 1, 2020; 1:00 p.m.		at Central Michigan	L 90–92 ^{OT}	13–7 (6–3)	McGuirk Arena (2,173); Mount Pleasant, MI
February 5, 2020; 7:00 p.m.		at Eastern Michigan	W 75–65	14–7 (7–3)	Convocation Center (1,013); Ypsilanti, MI
February 8, 2020; 1:00 p.m.		Kent State	W 63–57	15–7 (8–3)	Convocation Center (1,056); Athens, OH
February 15, 2020; 1:00 p.m.		at Miami (OH)	W 84–70	16–7 (9–3)	Millett Hall (1,418); Oxford, OH
February 19, 2020; 7:00 p.m.		Toledo	W 86–58	17–7 (10–3)	Convocation Center (691); Athens, OH
February 22, 2020; 1:00 p.m.		at Akron	L 76–79	17–8 (10–4)	James A. Rhodes Arena (1,424); Akron, OH
February 26, 2020; 7:00 p.m.		at Bowling Green	L 68–82	17–9 (10–5)	Stroh Center (1,047); Bowling Green, OH
February 29, 2020; 1:00 p.m.		Buffalo	L 62–63	17–10 (10–6)	Convocation Center (943); Athens, OH
Mar 4, 2020; 7:00 p.m.		at Kent State	L 77–81	17–11 (10–7)	MAC Center (1,637); Kent, OH
Mar 7, 2020; 1:00 p.m.		Miami (OH)	W 92–78	18–11 (11–7)	Convocation Center (699); Athens, OH
MAC Tournament
Mar 11, 2020; 2:30 p.m.	(4)	vs. (5) Western Michigan; Quarterfinals	W 84–75	19–11	Rocket Mortgage FieldHouse; Cleveland, OH
*Non-conference game. ^{#}Rankings from AP poll. (#) Tournament seedings in parentheses. All times are in Eastern.

== Awards and honors ==
=== Weekly awards ===
Weekly award honors
Honors	Player	Position	Date awarded	Source
MAC East player of the week	Erica Johnson	G	November 12	
MAC East player of the week	Amani Burke	G	December 3	
MAC East player of the week	Amani Burke	G	December 17	
MAC East player of the week	Cece Hooks	G	January 21	
MAC East player of the week	Erica Johnson	G	January 28	
MAC East player of the week	Cece Hooks	G	February 4	
MAC East player of the week	Erica Johnson	G	February 11	
MAC East player of the week	Erica Johnson	G	February 18	
MAC East player of the week	Cece Hooks	G	February 25	

=== All-MAC Awards ===
Postseason All-MAC teams
Award	Player	Position	Year
MAC defensive player of the year	Cece Hooks	G	Jr.
MAC 1st team	Cece Hooks	G	Jr.
MAC 1st team	Erica Johnson	G	R-So.
MAC honorable mention	Amani Burke	G	Sr.

== See also ==
- 2019–20 Ohio Bobcats men's basketball team
