= 2019–20 Buffalo Bulls women's basketball team =

Intercollegiate basketball season

2019–20 Buffalo Bulls women's basketball
- Conference: Mid-American Conference
- East Division
- Record: 19-12 (9-9 MAC)
- Head coach: Felisha Legette-Jack (8th season)
- Assistant coaches: Cherie Cordoba; Khyreed Carter; Kristen Sharkey
- Home arena: Alumni Arena

2019–20 Mid-American Conference women's basketball standings
	Conf.				Overall
Team	W		L	PCT	W		L	PCT
East
Kent State	11	–	7	.611	19	–	11	.633
Ohio	11	–	7	.611	19	–	11	.633
Buffalo	9	–	9	.500	19	–	12	.613
Akron	8	–	10	.444	15	–	15	.500
Miami (OH)	4	–	14	.222	11	–	20	.355
Bowling Green	3	–	15	.167	10	–	21	.323
West
Central Michigan	16	–	2	.889	23	–	7	.767
Ball State	13	–	5	.722	21	–	10	.677
Western Michigan	10	–	8	.556	18	–	13	.581
Eastern Michigan	9	–	9	.500	16	–	15	.516
Toledo	7	–	11	.389	14	–	17	.452
Northern Illinois	7	–	11	.389	11	–	19	.367
† 2020 MAC tournament winner Rankings from AP poll

The 2019–20 Buffalo Bulls women's basketball team represented the University at Buffalo during the 2019–20 NCAA Division I women's basketball season. The Bulls, led by eighth-year head coach Felisha Legette-Jack, played their home games at Alumni Arena as members of the East Division of the Mid-American Conference. They finished the season 19–12, 9–9 in MAC play. Buffalo won the MAC conference tournament championship game over Ohio, 77–61. Cierra Dillard was named the tournament's Most Valuable Player. With that win, they earned an automatic trip to the NCAA women's tournament, where they upset Rutgers in the first round before losing to Connecticut in the second round.

== Previous season ==
The Bulls finished the 2018–19 season 29–6, 16–2 in MAC play to win the MAC East Division. They advanced to the championship game of the Mid-American Conference women's basketball tournament, where they lost to Central Michigan. They received an at-large bid to the NCAA women's tournament, where they upset South Florida in the first round to win their first NCAA tournament win in school history. They then defeated Florida State in the second round to advance to the Sweet Sixteen for the first time in school history, where they lost to South Carolina. They finished with 29 wins, the most in school history.

== Offseason ==
=== Departures ===
Name	Number	Pos.	Height	Year	Hometown	Reason for departure
Stephanie Reid	1	G	5'6"	Senior	Melbourne, Australia	Graduated
Liisa Ups	3	G	5'9"	Senior	Wollongong, Australia	Graduated
Katherine Ups	5	G	5'9"	Senior	Wollongong, Australia	Graduated
Mariah Suchan	21	F	6'1"	Senior	Wichita, KS	Graduated
Cassie Oursler	31	G	6'3"	Senior	Grand Island, NY	Graduated

== Roster ==
2018–19 Buffalo Bulls women's basketball team
Players
Coaches

Pos.	#	Name	Height	Year	Previous school	Hometown
F	0	Summer Hemphill	6 ft 1 in (1.85 m)	Jr	Cardinal O'Hara	Buffalo, NY
G	2	Finess Dickson	5 ft 6 in (1.68 m)	RS Fr	Homewood-Flossmoor	South Holland, IL
G	4	Airiel Dickson	5 ft 10 in (1.78 m)	Fr	Homewood-Flossmoor	South Holland, IL
C	5	Zena Elias	6 ft 2 in (1.88 m)	Fr	Countryside	Clearwater, FL
G	10	Hanna Hall	5 ft 3 in (1.6 m)	So	Lincoln Prep	Hamilton, ON
G	11	Theresa Onwuka	5 ft 10 in (1.78 m)	Jr	Lake Forest Academy	Asaba, Nigeria
F	12	Courtney Wilkins	6 ft 1 in (1.85 m)	Sr	Haileybury College	Melbourne, Australia
G	13	Autumn Jones	5 ft 8 in (1.73 m)	Sr	Lawrence North; Pensacola State	Indianapolis, IN
G	15	Oceane Kounkou	6 ft 0 in (1.83 m)	Fr	Dawson College	Gatineau, QC
G	22	Ayoleka Sodade	5 ft 9 in (1.75 m)	Sr	Holy Names Catholic	Windsor, ON
F	23	Keowa Walters	6 ft 3 in (1.91 m)	Fr	Vaughan	Toronto, ON
G	24	Cierra Dillard	5 ft 9 in (1.75 m)	RS Sr	Gates Chili; Massachusetts	Rochester, NY
F	25	Adebola Adeyeye	6 ft 2 in (1.88 m)	Fr	The Rock School	Brampton, ON
F	30	Marissa Hamilton	5 ft 11 in (1.8 m)	So	Ellicottville Central	Great Valley, NY
F	32	Brittany Morrison	5 ft 9 in (1.75 m)	Sr	St. Joseph Academy	North Ridgeville, OH
F	33	Alexis Adams	6 ft 0 in (1.83 m)	Fr	South Brunswick	Monmouth Junction, NJ

Head coach

- Felisha Legette-Jack (Syracuse)

Assistant coach(es)

- Cherie Cordoba (UNLV)
- Khyreed Carter (Michigan State)
- Kristen Sharkey (Buffalo)

Legend

- (C) Team captain
- (S) Suspended
- (I) Ineligible
- (W) Walk-on
- Injured
- Current redshirt

Roster
Last update: November 26, 2018

== Schedule ==
Date time, TV	Rank^{#}	Opponent^{#}	Result	Record	High points	High rebounds	High assists	Site (attendance) city, state
Exhibition
November 1, 2018*; 7:00 p.m., ESPN+		Bloomsburg	W 94–53	–	27 – C. Dillard	9 – K. Walters	7 – C. Dillard	Alumni Arena; Buffalo, NY
Non-conference regular season
November 11, 2018*; 1:00 p.m.		at UMES	W 69–63	1–0	23 – C. Dillard	6 – B. Morrison	4 – C. Dillard	Hytche Athletic Center (1,147); Princess Anne, MD
November 11, 2018*; 5:00 p.m., ESPN+		Niagara	W 88–61	2–0	25 – C. Dillard	7 – C. Wilkins	5 – H. Hall	Alumni Arena (1,636); Buffalo, NY
November 18, 2018*; 5:00 p.m.		at No. 3 Oregon	L 82–102	2–1	32 – C. Dillard	7 – K. Walters	7 – H. Hall	Matthew Knight Arena (5,205); Eugene, OR
November 23, 2018*; 5:00 p.m.		vs. Georgetown; South Point Thanksgiving Shootout	W 73–64	3–1	33 – C. Dillard	6 – Tied	8 – C. Dillard	South Point Events Center; Las Vegas, NV
November 24, 2018*; 5:00 p.m.		vs. South Dakota State; South Point Thanksgiving Shootout	W 61–55	4–1	20 – C. Dillard	9 – C. Dillard	10 – H. Hall	South Point Events Center (477); Las Vegas, NV
December 1, 2018*; 1:00 p.m.		at Central Connecticut	W 82–69	5–1	27 – C. Dillard	16 – B. Morrison	2 – Tied	William H. Detrick Gymnasium; New Britain, CT
December 4, 2018*; 7:00 p.m.		at Canisius	W 84–66	6–1	25 – C. Dillard	5 – M. Hamilton	10 – C. Dillard	Koessler Athletic Center (826); Buffalo, NY
December 7, 2018*; 2:00 p.m., ESPN+		at Dayton	L 59–72	6–2	21 – C. Dillard	9 – A. Adeyeye	5 – C. Dillard	UD Arena (1,279); Dayton, OH
December 18, 2018*; 7:00 p.m.		at Dartmouth	W 75–69	7–2	26 – C. Dillard	14 – S. Hemphill	5 – C. Dillard	Leede Arena (383); Hanover, NH
December 21, 2018*; 12:00 p.m., ESPN+		No. 8 Stanford	L 55–62	7–3	21 – C. Dillard	13 – T. Onwuka	3 – Tied	Alumni Arena (3,412); Buffalo, NY
December 23, 2018*; 2:30 p.m., ESPN+		St. Bonaventure	W 90–43	8–3	26 – C. Dillard	8 – A. Adeyeye	6 – C. Dillard	Alumni Arena (1,994); Buffalo, NY
MAC regular season
January 5, 2019; 2:00 p.m., ESPN3		Ohio	L 71–74 ^{OT}	8–4 (0–1)	15 – C. Dillard	10 – S. Hemphill	7 – C. Dillard	Alumni Arena (2,116); Buffalo, NY
January 9, 2019; 7:00 pm, ESPN+		at Eastern Michigan	W 91–84 ^{OT}	9–4 (1–1)	43 – C. Dillard	9 – Tied	5 – C. Dillard	Convocation Center (1,114); Ypsilanti, MI
January 12, 2019; 2:00 p.m., ESPN+		at Miami (OH)	W 66–59	10–4 (2–1)	26 – C. Dillard	11 – T. Onwuka	10 – C. Dillard	Millett Hall (315); Oxford, OH
January 16, 2019; 7:00 pm, ESPN3		Ball State	W 77–65	11–4 (3–1)	21 – C. Dillard	10 – S. Hemphill	7 – C. Dillard	Alumni Arena (1,615); Buffalo, NY
January 19, 2019; 2:00 pm, ESPN3		at Western Michigan	W 61–59	12–4 (4–1)	19 – S. Hemphill	11 – S. Hemphill	3 – Tied	University Arena (730); Kalamazoo, MI
January 23, 2019; 7:00 pm, ESPN3		Akron	W 91–72	13–4 (5–1)	25 – C. Dillard	12 – S. Hemphill	7 – C. Dillard	Alumni Arena (1,492); Buffalo, NY
January 26, 2019; 2:00 pm, ESPN+		Northern Illinois	W 93–64	14–4 (6–1)	26 – C. Dillard	14 – S. Hemphill	11 – C. Dillard	Alumni Arena (2,174); Buffalo, NY
February 2, 2019; 1:00 pm, ESPN3		at Central Michigan	L 65–76	14–5 (6–2)	25 – C. Dillard	7 – S. Hemphill	2 – 3 tied	McGuirk Arena (2,228); Mount Pleasant, MI
February 6, 2019; 7:00 pm, ESPN+		Toledo	W 73–63	15–5 (7–2)	19 – S. Hemphill	7 – S. Hemphill	9 – C. Dillard	Alumni Arena (1,507); Buffalo, NY
February 9, 2019; 1:00 pm, ESPN3		Kent State	W 75–66	16–5 (8–2)	31 – C. Dillard	12 – S. Hemphill	11 – C. Dillard	Alumni Arena (2,385); Buffalo, NY
February 13, 2019; 7:00 pm, ESPN+		at Bowling Green	L 72–78	16–6 (8–3)	26 – C. Dillard	11 – S. Hemphill	6 – C. Dillard	Stroh Center (1,154); Bowling Green, OH
February 16, 2019; 2:00 pm, ESPN3		Central Michigan	L 95–100	16–7 (8–4)	29 – C. Dillard	9 – Tied	7 – C. Dillard	Alumni Arena (3,369); Buffalo, NY
February 20, 2019; 7:00 pm, ESPN3		at Ball State; Rescheduled from January 30	W 97–58	17–7 (9–4)	24 – S. Hemphill	10 – S. Hemphill	6 – C. Dillard	Worthen Arena (1,036); Muncie, IN
February 23, 2019; 7:00 pm, ESPN3		at Akron	L 59–70	17–8 (9–5)	23 – C. Dillard	11 – C. Dillard	3 – C. Dillard	James A. Rhodes Arena (479); Akron, OH
February 27, 2019; 7:00 pm, ESPN+		at Ohio	W 73–43	18–8 (10–5)	35 – C. Dillard	18 – S. Hemphill	5 – H. Hall	Convocation Center; Athens, OH
March 2, 2019; 2:00 pm, ESPN3		Miami (OH)	W 86–61	19–8 (11–5)	31 – C. Dillard	15 – S. Hemphill	8 – C. Dillard	Alumni Arena (3,509); Buffalo, NY
March 6, 2019; 7:00 pm, ESPN+		Bowling Green	W 75–61	20–8 (12–5)	27 – C. Dillard	16 – S. Hemphill	5 – F. Dickson	Alumni Arena (1,764); Buffalo, NY
March 9, 2019; 2:00 pm, ESPN+		at Kent State	L 53–62	20–9 (12–6)	18 – 2 tied	8 – 2 tied	2 – C. Dillard	MAC Center (1,731); Kent, OH
MAC Women's Tournament
March 13, 2019; 2:30 pm, ESPN+	(4)	vs. (5) Kent State; Quarterfinals	W 85–52	21–9	22 – C. Dillard	9 – S. Hemphill	5 – H. Hall	Quicken Loans Arena; Cleveland, OH
March 15, 2019; 11:00 am, ESPN+	(4)	vs. (1) Central Michigan; Semifinals	W 82–77	22–9	30 – C. Dillard	9 – S. Hemphill	7 – C. Dillard	Quicken Loans Arena; Cleveland, OH
March 16, 2019; 11:00 am, CBSSN	(4)	vs. (2) Ohio; Championship Game	W 77–61	23–9	22 – C. Dillard	21 – S. Hemphill	7 – H. Hall	Quicken Loans Arena (2,765); Cleveland, OH
NCAA Women's Tournament
Mar 22, 2019*; 4:30 pm, ESPN2	(10 A)	vs. (7 A) Rutgers; First Round	W 82–71	24–9	23 – S. Hemphill	7 – S. Hemphill	8 – H. Hall	Harry A. Gampel Pavilion; Storrs, CT
Mar 24, 2019*; 7:00 pm, ESPN	(10 A)	at (2 A) No. 2 Connecticut; Second Round	L 72–84	24–10	29 – C. Dillard	10 – B. Morrison	7 – C. Dillard	Harry A. Gampel Pavilion (6,390); Storrs, CT
*Non-conference game. ^{#}Rankings from AP Poll. (#) Tournament seedings in parentheses. A=Albany Regional. All times are in Eastern Time.

== Rankings ==
+ Regular season polls	Poll	Pre- season	Week 2	Week 3	Week 4	Week 5	Week 6	Week 7	Week 8	Week 9	Week 10	Week 11	Week 12	Week 13	Week 14	Week 15	Week 16	Week 17	Week 18	Week 19	Final
AP	RV	RV																			
Coaches																					

Legend
	Increase in ranking
	Decrease in ranking
	Not ranked previous week
(RV)	Received votes

== See also ==
- 2018–19 Buffalo Bulls men's basketball team
