= Central Michigan Chippewas basketball =

Central Michigan Chippewas basketball may refer to either of the basketball teams that represent Central Michigan University:

- Central Michigan Chippewas men's basketball
- Central Michigan Chippewas women's basketball
