= 2012–13 Ohio Bobcats women's basketball team =

Intercollegiate basketball season

2012–13 Ohio Bobcats women's basketball
- Conference: Mid-American Conference
- East Division
- Record: 6–23 (1–15 MAC)
- Head coach: Semeka Randall (5th season)
- Home arena: Convocation Center

2012–13 Mid-American Conference women's basketball standings
	Conf.				Overall
Team	W		L	PCT	W		L	PCT
Akron	12	–	4	.750	23	–	9	.719
Bowling Green	11	–	5	.688	22	–	10	.688
Miami (OH)	10	–	6	.625	19	–	12	.613
Buffalo	8	–	8	.500	12	–	20	.375
Ohio	1	–	15	.063	6	–	23	.207
Kent State	1	–	15	.063	3	–	27	.100
West
Toledo	15	–	1	.938	27	–	3	.900
Central Michigan†	12	–	4	.750	21	–	11	.656
Ball State	12	–	4	.750	15	–	15	.500
Western Michigan	6	–	10	.375	11	–	20	.355
Eastern Michigan	6	–	10	.375	8	–	22	.267
Northern Illinois	2	–	14	.125	7	–	23	.233
† 2013 MAC tournament winner Rankings from AP poll

The 2012–13 Ohio Bobcats women's basketball team represented Ohio University during the 2012–13 NCAA Division I women's basketball season. The Bobcats, led by fifth year head coach Semeka Randall in her final year at the helm, played their home games at the Convocation Center in Athens, Ohio as a member of the Mid-American Conference. They finished the season 6–23 and 1–15 in MAC play. After the season Randall was fired.

== Preseason ==
The preseason poll and league awards were announced by the league office on October 30, 2012. Ohio was picked fourth in the MAC East

=== Preseason women's basketball poll ===
(First place votes in parentheses)

==== East Division ====
1. Miami (16)
2. Bowling Green (13)
3. Akron (1)
4. Ohio
5. Kent State
6. Buffalo

==== West Division ====
1. Toledo (24)
2. Central Michigan (6)
3. Eastern Michigan
4. Northern Illinois
5. Western Michigan
6. Ball State

==== Tournament champs ====
Toledo (16), Central Michigan (12), Bowling Green (2)

== Schedule ==
Date time, TV	Rank^{#}	Opponent^{#}	Result	Record	Site (attendance) city, state
Non-conference regular season
Nov 13, 2012*		Cleveland State	W 63–56	1–0	
Nov 17, 2012*		at Minnesota	L 40–85	1–1	
Nov 18, 2012*		vs. UNLV	L 51–60	1–2	
Nov 25, 2012*		Duquesne	L 55–62	1–3	
Nov 29, 2012*		Massachusetts	L 61–65	1–4	
Dec 2, 2012*		Detroit	L 53–65	1–5	
Dec 6, 2012*		Eastern Kentucky	W 69–58	2–5	
Dec 9, 2012*		Morehead State	W 79–72 ^{OT}	3–5	
Dec 15, 2012*		at Marshall	W 55–48	4–5	
Dec 19, 2012*		at Manhattan	L 49–58	4–6	
Dec 21, 2012*		at LIU Brooklyn	L 54–63	4–7	
Jan 5, 2013*		at Xavier	W 68–62	5–7	
MAC regular season
Jan 10, 2013		Akron	L 54–81	5–8 (0–1)	
Jan 13, 2013		at Buffalo	L 36–73	5–9 (0–2)	
Jan 17, 2013		at Miami (OH)	L 56–78	5–10 (0–3)	
Jan 20, 2013		Bowling Green	L 41–67	5–11 (0–4)	
Jan 23, 2013		Central Michigan	L 48–77	5–12 (0–5)	
Jan 26, 2013		at Ball State	L 46–77	5–13 (0–6)	
Jan 31, 2013		at Toledo	L 42–61	5–14 (0–7)	
Feb 3, 2013		Kent State	L 55–57	5–15 (0–8)	
Feb 6, 2013		Northern Illinois	L 52–73	5–16 (0–9)	
Feb 9, 2013		at Eastern Michigan	L 57–64	5–17 (0–10)	
Feb 16, 2013		Western Michigan	L 53–62	5–18 (0–11)	
Feb 20, 2013		at Kent State	W 61–55	6–18 (1–11)	
Feb 23, 2013		Buffalo	L 35–56	6–19 (1–12)	
Feb 28, 2013		at Akron	L 82–98	6–20 (1–13)	
Mar 3, 2013		at Bowling Green	L 52–73	6–21 (1–14)	
Mar 6, 2013		Miami (OH)	L 61–66	6–22 (1–15)	
MAC Tournament
Mar 9, 2013		at Miami (OH)	L 61–83	6–23	
*Non-conference game. ^{#}Rankings from AP Poll. (#) Tournament seedings in parentheses. All times are in Eastern Time.

== Awards and honors ==
=== All-MAC Awards ===
Postseason All-MAC teams
Team	Player	Position	Year
All-MAC Freshman team	Kiyanna Black	G	Fr.
