= 2020–21 Ohio Bobcats women's basketball team =

Intercollegiate basketball season

2020–21 Ohio Bobcats women's basketball

WNIT, WNIT Regional consolation championship game
- Conference: Mid-American Conference
- Record: 15-9 (11-6 MAC)
- Head coach: Bob Boldon (8th season)
- Assistant coaches: Tavares Jackson; Steph Haas; Marwan Miller
- Home arena: Convocation Center

2020–21 Mid-American Conference women's basketball standings
	Conf.				Overall
Team	W		L	PCT	W		L	PCT
Bowling Green	14	–	4	.778	20	–	5	.800
Central Michigan†	13	–	6	.684	17	–	8	.680
Ohio	11	–	6	.647	14	–	8	.636
Buffalo	11	–	6	.647	15	–	9	.625
Kent State	10	–	6	.625	11	–	9	.550
Ball State	12	–	8	.600	14	–	11	.560
Northern Illinois	10	–	8	.556	12	–	12	.500
Eastern Michigan	7	–	7	.500	10	–	10	.500
Toledo	8	–	12	.400	12	–	12	.500
Western Michigan	5	–	14	.263	6	–	15	.286
Akron	4	–	14	.222	7	–	14	.333
Miami (OH)	3	–	17	.150	4	–	20	.167
† 2021 MAC tournament winner As of July 7, 2024; Rankings from AP poll

The 2020–21 Ohio Bobcats women's basketball team represented Ohio University during the 2020–21 NCAA Division I women's basketball season. The Bobcats, led by eighth-year head coach Bob Boldon, played their home games at the Convocation Center in Athens, Ohio as a member of the Mid-American Conference.

This season was played during the ongoing COVID-19 pandemic. As a result, schedules were shortened and consolidated, and most games were played without general fan attendance.

Ohio opened the non-conference slate of games with a win over Liberty and upset of national power Notre Dame. They were named NCAA Team of the Week for their first week effort.

They finished the season 15-10, 11-6 in MAC play. They finished 3rd overall in the MAC. They advanced to the semi-finals of the MAC women's tournament, where they lost to Central Michigan. They received an at-large bid to the WNIT, where they lost to Clemson, defeated Fordham, and lost to Massachusetts. Ohio was led by their point guard Cece Hooks, who was named MAC player of the year.

== Offseason ==
=== Departures ===
Departures
Name	Number	Pos.	Height	Year	Hometown	Reason for departure
Katie Barker	2	G	5'10	RS junior	Cary, Illinois	Graduated
Amani Burke	3	G	5'9	RS senior	Cary, Illinois	Graduated, exhasted eligibility

=== 2020 recruiting class ===
Recruiting class
Name	Number	Pos.	Height	High school	Hometown
Kate Dennis	14	G	6'1	Guilford	Rockford, Illinois
Kendall Hale	22	G	5'8	West Clemont	Cincinnati, Ohio

== Preseason ==
Ohio was picked second in the MAC preseason poll. Cece Hooks and Erica Johnson were named to the preseason first team all-conference.

=== Preseason rankings ===
MAC preseason poll
Predicted finish	Team	Votes (1st place)
1	Central Michigan	142 (10)
2	Ohio	128
3	Ball State	119 (1)
4	Buffalo	108 (1)
5	Eastern Michigan	94
6	Kent State	88
7	Toledo	71
8	Northern Illinois	42
9	Miami	41
10	Akron	39
11	Bowling Green	38
12	Western Michigan	28

MAC Tournament Champion: Central Michigan (6), Ohio (3), Buffalo (1), Ball State (1), EMU (1) Source

=== Preseason All-MAC ===
Preseason All-MAC teams
Team	Player	Position	Year
Preseason All-MAC 1st team	Cece Hooks	G	Sr.
Preseason All-MAC 1st team	Erica Johnson	G	R-Jr.

=== Award watch lists ===
Preseason award honors
Honors	Player	Position	Year	Source
Nancy Lieberman Award	Cece Hooks	G	Sr.	
Cheryl Miller Award	Erica Johnson	G	R-Jr.	
Becky Hammon Award	Cece Hooks	G	Sr.	
Becky Hammon Award	Erica Johnson	G	R-Jr.	

== Roster ==
2020–21 Ohio Bobcats women's basketball team
Players
Coaches

Pos.	#	Name	Height	Year	Previous school	Hometown
G	1	Cece Hooks	5 ft 8 in (1.73 m)	Sr	Thurgood Marshall	Dayton, OH
G	4	Erica Johnson	5 ft 11 in (1.8 m)	RS Jr	Mansfield Senior	Mansfield, OH
G	5	Caitlyn Kroll	5 ft 10 in (1.78 m)	RS Jr	Bridgeport; Saint Francis (PA)	Bridgeport, OH
G	13	Kaylee Bambule	5 ft 8 in (1.73 m)	RS Jr	Montini Catholic	Plainfield, IL
F	20	Abby Garnett	6 ft 1 in (1.85 m)	RS So	Golden	Golden, CO
G	25	Hunter Rogan (W)	5 ft 8 in (1.73 m)	Sr	Urbana	Urbana, OH
F	21	Deesh Beck	5 ft 9 in (1.75 m)	Jr	Grand Rapids Christian	Grand Rapids, MI
F	35	Alexandra Antonova	6 ft 2 in (1.88 m)	RS So	Teays Valley	Moscow, Russia
F	41	Gabby Burris	5 ft 11 in (1.8 m)	Sr	Liberty Union	Baltimore, OH
G	23	Jasmine Hale	5 ft 8 in (1.73 m)	Jr	West Clemont	Cincinnati, OH
F	44	Ella Pope	5 ft 11 in (1.8 m)	RS Fr	Timpview	Orem, UT
G	11	Peyton Guice	5 ft 11 in (1.8 m)	So	Westerville South	Westerville, OH
G	3	Madi Mace	5 ft 11 in (1.8 m)	RS Fr	Parkersburg	Parkersburg, WV
G	14	Kate Dennis	6 ft 1 in (1.85 m)	Fr	Guilford	Rockford, IL
G	22	Kendall Hale	5 ft 8 in (1.73 m)	Fr	West Clemont	Cincinnati, OH

Head coach

- Bob Boldon (Walsh)

Assistant coach(es)

- Tavares Jackson (Minnesota)
- Steph Haas (Florida Gulf Coast)
- Marwan Miller (Franklin (OH))

Legend

- (C) Team captain
- (S) Suspended
- (I) Ineligible
- (W) Walk-on
- Injured
- Current redshirt

Roster

== Schedule ==
Date time, TV	Rank^{#}	Opponent^{#}	Result	Record	Site (attendance) city, state
Non-conference regular season
Nov 25, 2020*; 1:00 pm		Liberty	W 76-72	1-0	Convocation Center; Athens, OH
Nov 27, 2020*; 12:00 pm		No. 22 Notre Dame	W 86-85	2-0	Convocation Center; Athens, OH
MAC regular season
Dec 11, 2020; 2:00 pm		at Kent State	L 80-84	2-1 (0-1)	MAC Center; Kent, OH
Dec 16, 2020; 6:00 pm		at Northern Illinois	W 77-67	3-1 (1-1)	Convocation Center; DeKalb, IL
Dec 21, 2020*; 12:00 pm		West Virginia	L 79-88	3-2	WVU Coliseum; Morgantown, WV
Jan 2, 2021; 1:00 pm		Central Michigan	L 87-90	3-3 (1–2)	Convocation Center; Athens, OH
Jan 6, 2021; 5:30 pm		at Miami (OH)	W 72-63	4-3 (2-2)	Millett Hall; Oxford, OH
Jan 9, 2021; 1:00 pm		Toledo	W 85-66	5-3 (3-2)	Convocation Center; Athens, OH
Jan 13, 2021; 6:00 pm		Ball State	L 86-88 ^{OT}	5-4 (3-3)	Convocation Center; Athens, OH
Jan 16, 2021; 1:00 pm		at Central Michigan	W 93-84	6-4 (4-3)	McGuirk Arena; Mount Pleasant, MI
Jan 20, 2021; 6:00 pm		Buffalo	W 84-81	7-4 (5-3)	Convocation Center; Athens, OH
Jan 23, 2021; 12:00 pm		at Western Michigan	W 69-63	8-4 (6-3)	University Arena; Kalamazoo, MI
Jan 27, 2021; 7:00 pm		at Eastern Michigan	L 66-69	8-5 (6-4)	Convocation Center; Ypsilanti, MI
Jan 30, 2021; 1:00 pm		Akron	W 85-55	9-5 (7-4)	Convocation Center; Athens, OH
Feb 3, 2021; 6:00 pm		Kent State	W 85-70	10-5 (8-4)	Convocation Center; Athens, OH
Feb 6, 2021; 12:00 pm		at Bowling Green	L 53-69	10-6 (8-5)	Stroh Center; Bowling Green, OH
Feb 10, 2021; 7:00 pm		at Ball State	W 88-66	11-6 (9-5)	Worthen Arena; Muncie, IN
Feb 13, 2021; 12:00 pm		Western Michigan	W 674-52	12-6 (10-5)	Convocation Center; Athens, OH
Mar 3, 2021; 6:00 pm		at Akron	L 67-71	12-7 (10-6)	James A. Rhodes Arena; Akron, OH
Mar 6, 2021; 1:00 pm		Miami (OH)	W 84-70	13-7 (11-6)	Convocation Center; Athens, OH
MAC Tournament
Mar 10, 2021; 6:50 pm	(3)	vs. (6) Ball State; Quarterfinals	W 61-59	14-7	Rocket Mortgage FieldHouse; Cleveland, OH
Mar 12, 2021; 12:30 pm	(3)	vs. (2) Central Michigan; Quarterfinals	L 92-100 ^{OT}	14-8	Rocket Mortgage FieldHouse; Cleveland, OH
WNIT
Mar 19, 2021*; 2:00 pm		vs. Clemson; First Round – Charlotte Regional	W 65-60	14-9	Bojangles Coliseum; Charlotte, NC
Mar 20, 2021*; 11:00 am		vs. Fordham; Consolation Round – Charlotte Regional	L 81-84	15-9	Bojangles Coliseum; Charlotte, NC
Mar 22, 2021*; 4:00 pm		vs. Massachusetts; Consolation Final – Charlotte Regional	L 71-95	15-10	Bojangles Coliseum; Charlotte, NC
*Non-conference game. ^{#}Rankings from AP Poll. (#) Tournament seedings in parentheses. All times are in Eastern Time.

== Awards and honors ==
=== Weekly awards ===
Weekly award honors
Honors	Player	Position	Date awarded	Source
MAC Player of the Week	Cece Hooks	G	December 1	
MAC Player of the Week	Cece Hooks	G	January 12	
MAC Player of the Week	Cece Hooks	G	January 26	
MAC Player of the Week	Cece Hooks	G	February 2	
MAC Player of the Week	Cece Hooks	G	March 8	

=== Midseason awards watchlists ===
Midseason award honors
Honors	Player	Position	Year	Source
Becky Hammon Award	Cece Hooks	G	Sr.	
Becky Hammon Award	Erica Johnson	G	R-Jr.	

=== All-MAC awards ===
Postseason All-MAC teams
Award	Player	Position	Year
MAC Player of the Year	Cece Hooks	G	Sr.
MAC Defensive Player of the Year	Cece Hooks	G	Sr.
MAC 1st Team	Cece Hooks	G	Sr.
MAC 3rd Team	Erica Johnson	G	R-Jr.
MAC Honorable Mention	Gabby Burris	F	Sr.
MAC Freshman Team	Madi Mace	G	R-Fr.
MAC Defensive Team	Cece Hooks	G	Sr.

=== National awards ===
National award honors
Honor	Player	Position	Source
Honorable Mention All-American	Cece Hooks	G	

== Rankings ==
Ranking movements Legend: ██ Increase in ranking ██ Decrease in ranking — = Not ranked RV = Received votes
	Week																				
Poll	Pre	1	2	3	4	5	6	7	8	9	10	11	12	13	14	15	16	17	18	19	Final
AP	—	RV	RV	—	—	—	—	—	—	—	—	—	—	—	—	—	—	—	—	—	Not released
Coaches	—	—^	RV	—	—	—	—	—	—	—	—	—	—	—	—	—	—	—	—	—	

*AP does not release post-NCAA Tournament rankings.
^Coaches do not release a Week 1 poll.
