= 2013 MAC women's basketball tournament =

- Classification: Division I
- Season: 2012–13
- Teams: 12
- Site: Quicken Loans Arena; Cleveland, Ohio
- Champions: Central Michigan
- Winning coach: Sue Guevara
- MVP: Crystal Bradford (Central Michigan)
- MAC women's basketball tournaments

2012–13 Mid-American Conference women's basketball standings
	Conf.				Overall
Team	W		L	PCT	W		L	PCT
Akron	12	–	4	.750	23	–	9	.719
Bowling Green	11	–	5	.688	22	–	10	.688
Miami (OH)	10	–	6	.625	19	–	12	.613
Buffalo	8	–	8	.500	12	–	20	.375
Ohio	1	–	15	.063	6	–	23	.207
Kent State	1	–	15	.063	3	–	27	.100
West
Toledo	15	–	1	.938	27	–	3	.900
Central Michigan†	12	–	4	.750	21	–	11	.656
Ball State	12	–	4	.750	15	–	15	.500
Western Michigan	6	–	10	.375	11	–	20	.355
Eastern Michigan	6	–	10	.375	8	–	22	.267
Northern Illinois	2	–	14	.125	7	–	23	.233
† 2013 MAC tournament winner Rankings from AP poll

The 2013 Mid-American Conference women's basketball tournament was the post-season basketball tournament for the Mid-American Conference (MAC) 2012–13 college basketball season. The 2013 tournament was held March 9–16, 2013. Fourth seeded Central Michigan won the championship over third seeded Akron. Crystal Bradford of Central Michigan was the MVP.

== Format ==
First round games were held on campus sites at the higher seed on March 9. The remaining rounds were held at Quicken Loans Arena, between March 13–16. The top two seeds received byes into the semifinals, with the three and four seeds receiving a bye to the quarterfinals.

== Seeds ==
Seed	School	Conference record	Division
1#	Toledo	15–1	West
2#	Ball State	12–4	West
3†	Akron	12–4	East
4†	Central Michigan	12–4	West
5	Bowling Green	11–5	East
6	Miami	10–6	East
7	Buffalo	8–8	East
8	Eastern Michigan	6–10	West
9	Western Michigan	6–10	West
10	Northern Illinois	2–14	West
11	Ohio	1–15	East
12	Kent State	1–15	East
† – Received a Bye to quarterfinals. # - Received a bye to the semifinals Overall record are as of the end of the regular season.

== Bracket ==
First round Saturday, March 9
5	Bowling Green	76
12	Kent State	35
8	Eastern Michigan	72
9	Western Michigan	80
6	Miami	83
11	Ohio	61
7	Buffalo	56
10	Northern Illinois	46

Second round Wednesday, March 13
1	Toledo
(bye)
4	Central Michigan
(bye)
5	Bowling Green	55
9	Western Michigan	53
2	Ball State
(bye)
3	Akron
(bye)
6	Miami	70
7	Buffalo	82

Quarterfinals; Thursday, March 14
1	Toledo
(bye)
4	Central Michigan	81
5	Bowling Green	48
2	Ball State
(bye)
3	Akron	83
7	Buffalo	79

Semifinals; Friday, March 15
1	Toledo	61
4	Central Michigan	66
2	Ball State	61
3	Akron	70

Championship; Saturday, March 16
4	Central Michigan	86
3	Akron	68

== All-Tournament Team ==
Tournament MVP – Crystal Bradford, Central Michigan

Player	Team
Jessica Schroll	Central Michigan
Crystal Bradford	Central Michigan
Brandie Baker	Central Michigan
Hanna Luburgh	Akron
Rachel Tecca	Akron
