= Micaela Kelly =

American basketball player (born 1998)

No. [1] – BelgiumRoyal Castors Braine
- Title: Guard
- League: Top Division Women

Personal information
- Born: July 2, 1998 (age 28) [Detroit][Michigan]
- Listed height: 5 ft 7 in (1.70 m)
- Listed weight: 160 lb (73 kg)

Career information
- High school: Martin Luther King (Detroit, Michigan)
- College: Central Michigan (2016–2021)
- WNBA draft: 2021: 2nd round, 21st overall pick
- Drafted by: Connecticut Sun
- Playing career: 2021–Currently playing
- Position: Guard

Career history
- 2021: Antalya Gunesi
- 2021–2022: Breiðablik
- 2022: Detroit Queens

Career highlights
- MAC Tournament MVP (2021); MAC Player of the Year (2020); 2× First-team All-MAC (2020, 2021); 2× MAC All-Defensive team (2020, 2021); MAC All-Freshman Team (2018)
- Stats at Basketball Reference

Michaela Lynn Kelly (born July 2, 1998) is an American basketball player and coach. She played college basketball for Central Michigan before being drafted playing professionally in Turkey and Iceland. Kelly was drafted in the second round of the 2021 WNBA draft by the Connecticut Sun of the Women's National Basketball Association.

== Early life ==
Kelly was born in Detroit, Michigan. She played basketball for The Cooper elementary cougars A.L Holmes Eagles and Detroit King High School. She was named to the All-Detroit High School Girls Basketball first team in 2016.

== College career ==
Kelly attended Central Michigan University. She led CMU to a Mid-American Conference title and an NCAA tournament berth. She is the second player in program history in terms of points with 2,173. She was an MAC Player of the Year in 2019–20. Her senior year, she averaged 23.9 points and 4.9 assists. She graduated in 2021 with a degree in community development.

== Professional career ==
Kelly announced in March 2021 that she would forgo a year of eligibility to declare for the WNBA Draft. She is the second player from Central Michigan to be selected.

After starting the season with Antalya Gunesi in Turkey, Kelly signed with Breiðablik of the Icelandic Úrvalsdeild in November 2021, replacing Chelsey Shumpert. On February 13, 2022, she scored a season high 39 points in a win against Haukar. On February 19, 2022, the Indiana Fever announced that they have signed Kelly to a training camp contract despite she still being under contract with Breiðablik where she was averaging 23.7 points, 8.8 rebounds and 5.4 assists per game. She was waived by the Fever on 20 April.

== Coaching career ==
In August 2022, Kelly joined the coaching staff of Central Michigan women's basketball team as the program's director of player development.

== Statistics ==
=== College ===
Ratios
| Year | Team | GP | FG% | 3P% | FT% | RBG | APG | BPG | SPG | PPG |
|---|---|---|---|---|---|---|---|---|---|---|
| 2016–17 | Central Michigan | Did not play per NCAA transfer rules | | | | | | | | |
| 2017–18 | Central Michigan | 35 | 50.0% | 38.9% | 71.1% | 4.34 | 3.51 | 0.40 | 1.23 | 11.54 |
| 2018–19 | Central Michigan | 33 | 49.3% | 41.7% | 81.0% | 4.27 | 3.85 | 0.15 | 1.55 | 14.58 |
| 2019–20 | Central Michigan | 30 | 42.8% | 35.5% | 80.9% | 6.47 | 4.93 | 0.33 | 1.77 | 21.47 |
| 2020–21 | Central Michigan | 27 | 48.8% | 35.7% | 80.5% | 4.85 | 4.26 | 0.22 | 2.19 | 23.85 |
| Career | | 125 | 47.3% | 37.6% | 78.9% | 4.94 | 4.10 | 0.28 | 1.65 | 17.38 |

Totals
| Year | Team | GP | FG | FGA | 3P | 3PA | FT | FTA | REB | A | BK | ST | PTS |
|---|---|---|---|---|---|---|---|---|---|---|---|---|---|
| 2016–17 | Central Michigan | Did not play per NCAA rules | | | | | | | | | | | |
| 2017–18 | Central Michigan | 35 | 148 | 296 | 44 | 113 | 64 | 90 | 152 | 123 | 14 | 43 | 404 |
| 2018–19 | Central Michigan | 33 | 174 | 353 | 65 | 156 | 68 | 84 | 141 | 127 | 5 | 51 | 481 |
| 2019–20 | Central Michigan | 30 | 219 | 512 | 75 | 211 | 131 | 162 | 194 | 148 | 10 | 53 | 644 |
| 2020–21 | Central Michigan | 27 | 233 | 477 | 71 | 199 | 107 | 133 | 131 | 115 | 6 | 59 | 644 |
| Career | | 125 | 774 | 1638 | 255 | 679 | 370 | 469 | 618 | 513 | 35 | 206 | 2173 |
