= Bri Kulas =

American professional women's basketball player

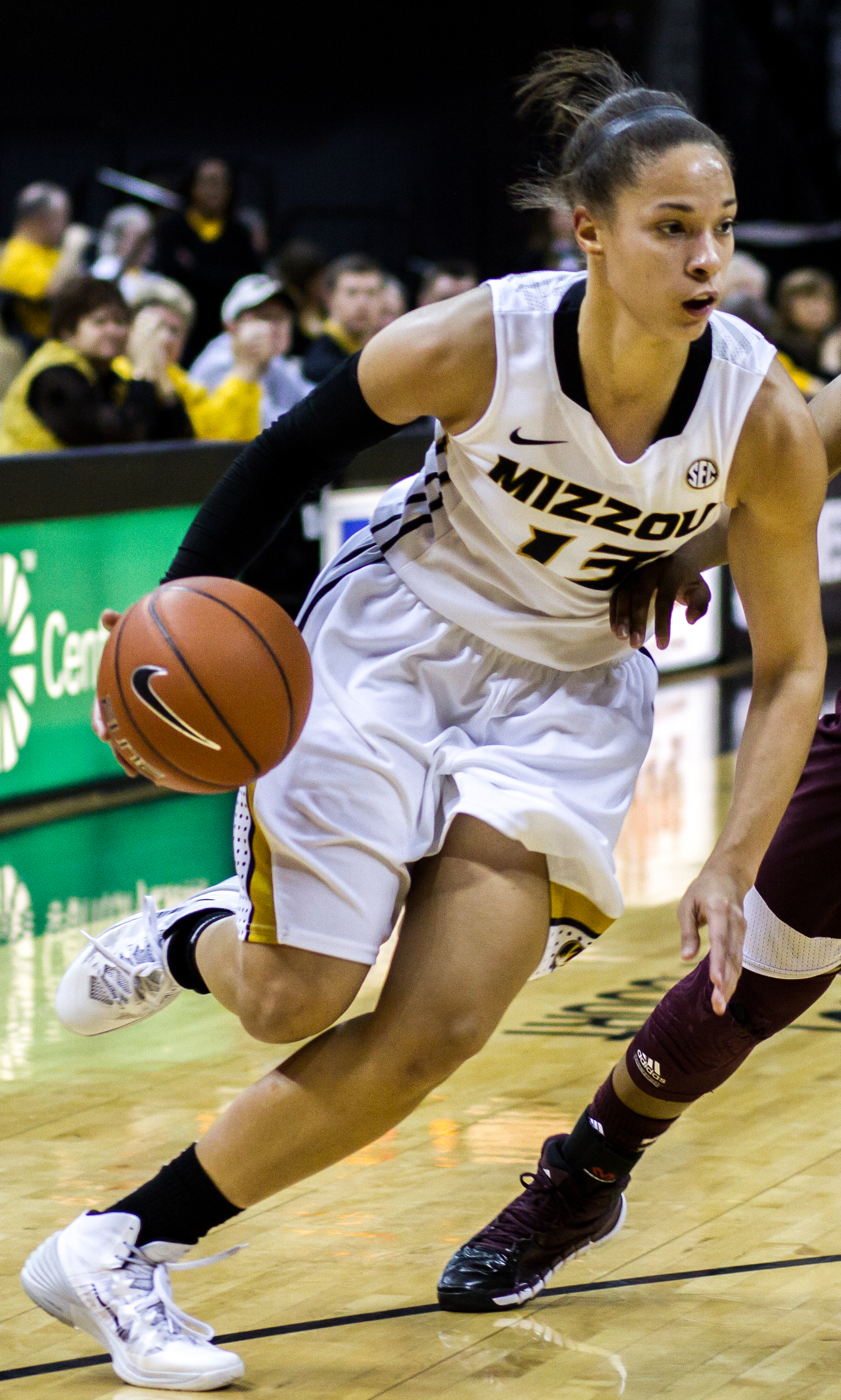
- Bri Kulas with Missouri in 2014

Personal information
- Born: June 2, 1992 (age 34) Shawnee Mission, Kansas
- Listed height: 6 ft 1 in (1.85 m)

Career information
- High school: Shawnee Mission North (Overland Park, Kansas)
- College: Kansas State (2010–2011); Johnson County CC (2011–2012); Missouri (2012–2014)
- WNBA draft: 2014: 3rd round, 28th overall pick
- Drafted by: San Antonio Stars
- Playing career: 2014–present
- Position: Forward

Career highlights
- First-team All-SEC (2014)
- Stats at Basketball Reference

Brianna Kulas (born June 2, 1992) is an American professional women's basketball player originally drafted with the San Antonio Stars of the WNBA in 2014. In her career, Kulas has played for the Kansas State Wildcats, Johnson County Cavaliers and Missouri Tigers. She was cut after attending training.

== Biography ==
=== Early life ===
Kulas was born on June 2, 1992, the daughter of Greg Jordan and Kelly Williams in Shawnee Mission, Kansas. She attended and graduated from Shawnee Mission North High School where she played basketball starting with her freshman year on junior varsity. There she earned a Sporting News honorable-mention All-American honors. Coming off her junior year she committed to Kansas State where she had been offered her only scholarship opportunity.

=== Playing career ===
After a season of receiving limited playing time with the Wildcats, Kulas transferred to Johnson County Community College in 2011. As a sophomore, she led the Cavaliers in scoring and was recognized as an NJCAA Division II All-American. In her two years at Missouri, she led the Tigers in scoring in her junior and senior years and scored over a thousand points overall. In her last season with Missouri, Kulas ranked second in the Southeastern Conference in scoring and led Missouri in scoring in 18 games. Kulas was drafted by the San Antonio Stars in the fourth selection of the third round (28th overall) at the culmination of her final year at Missouri. She was eventually cut by the team after attending training in May.

Kulas signed with CB Islas Canarias of the Liga Femenina de Baloncesto in July 2014.

== Career statistics ==
Legend
GP	Games played	GS	Games started	MPG	Minutes per game	RPG	Rebounds per game
APG	Assists per game	SPG	Steals per game	BPG	Blocks per game	PPG	Points per game
TO	Turnovers per game	FG%	Field-goal percentage	3P%	3-point field-goal percentage	FT%	Free-throw percentage
**Bold**	Career best	°	League leader

=== College ===
Year	Team	GP	GS	MPG	FG%	3P%	FT%	RPG	APG	SPG	BPG	TO	PPG
2012–13	Missouri	**32**	**32**	**30.0**	41.1	**46.2**	73.0	6.5	1.7	**0.7**	0.3	**2.3**	13.8
2013–14	Missouri	31	30	28.6	**43.5**	45.1	**83.2**	**6.7**	**2.0**	0.5	**0.5**	3.0	**18.3**
**Career**		63	62	29.3	42.4	45.6	78.6	6.6	1.8	0.6	0.4	2.7	16
Statistics retrieved from Sports-Reference.
