= Crystal Bradford =

American basketball player (born 1993)

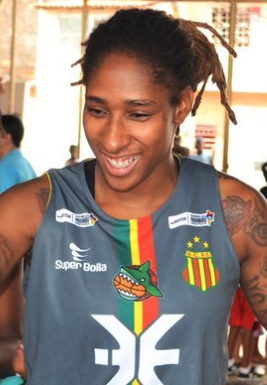
- Bradford in Brazil (2015)

Free agent
- Position: Guard

Personal information
- Born: November 1, 1993 (age 33) Detroit, Michigan, U.S.
- Listed height: 6 ft 0 in (1.83 m)
- Listed weight: 170 lb (77 kg)

Career information
- High school: Inkster (Inkster, Michigan)
- College: Central Michigan (2011–2015)
- WNBA draft: 2015: 1st round, 7th overall pick
- Drafted by: Los Angeles Sparks

Career history
- 2015: Los Angeles Sparks
- 2016: Vimpelin Veto
- 2017: Flint Lady Monarchs
- 2017–2018: Elitzur Holon
- 2018–2019: Bnot Hertzeliya
- 2020–2011: Beşiktaş JK
- 2021: Ramat Hasharon
- 2021: Atlanta Dream
- 2021–2022: AZS Poznań
- 2022–2023: Uni Girona CB
- 2023: Los Angeles Sparks
- 2023: Athletes Unlimited League
- 2025: Las Vegas Aces

Career highlights
- GWBA champion (2017); GWBA Finals MVP (2017); MAC Player of the Year (2014); MAC Defensive Player of the Year (2014); Mid-American Conference Tournament MVP (2013); 2× First-team All-MAC (2013, 2014); MAC All-Freshman Team (2012)
- Stats at Basketball Reference
Medals
Women's basketball
Representing United States
World University Games
Gold medal – first place	2013 Kazan	Team

Crystal Bradford (born November 1, 1993) is an American professional basketball player who is currently a free agent. A star college player at Central Michigan University, she made history being the first player in the CMU program to ever be drafted to the WNBA. She was drafted seventh overall by the Los Angeles Sparks in the 2015 WNBA draft.

== Early life ==
Crystal Bradford attended Inkster High School.

== College career ==
Bradford finished her college career as CMU's all-time leader in points (2,006), rebounds (1,140), made field goals (805), and blocks (177). She was the first CMU player to be drafted in the WNBA draft.

== Professional career ==
=== United States ===
Bradford was drafted by the Los Angeles Sparks with the 7th pick in the 2015 WNBA draft. She appeared in 15 games during the 2015 season, averaging 2.7 points per game.

During the summer of 2017, she played for the Flint Lady Monarchs of the Global Women's Basketball Association, helping the team win the GWBA title while being named the Finals MVP.

In April 2021, Bradford signed with the Atlanta Dream. On 24 August 2021, Bradford sustained a Jones fracture in her right foot and missed the remainder of the season. For the season, she averaged 8.8 points and 3.8 rebounds. In October 2021, it was reported that the Dream would not resign Bradford after footage of her involvement in a fight outside of a club in Atlanta in May 2021 circulated on social media.

In February 2022, Bradford signed with the Chicago Sky.

In May 2023, Bradford was waived by the Los Angeles Sparks after one preseason game. She scored 4 points against the Phoenix Mercury on May 12, 2023.

On February 21, 2025, Bradford signed a training camp contract with the Las Vegas Aces. On June 11, she was waived by the Aces.

=== Overseas ===
In January 2016, Bradford signed with Vimpelin Veto of the Naisten Korisliiga. In 11 games she averaged 15.8 points and 10.1 rebounds per game.

She played for Israel club Elitzur Holon during the 2017–2018 season. In 26 games, she averaged 19.6 points, 13.7 rebounds, 4.3 assists, and 1.5 steals, helping Elitzur to both league and Cup finals.

In May 2018, Bradford signed with Bnot Hertzeliya. In 23 games for the club, she averaged 22.1 points and 14.5 rebounds.

During the 2020–21 season, she played first played for Beşiktaş JK where she averaged 20.2 points, 10.9 rebounds, 3.8 assists, and 2.0 steals in 19 games. She later signed with Ramat Hasharon, where she averaged 19.3 points, 9.8 rebounds, 3.5 assists, and 2.5 steals in 11 games.

In May 2021, Bradford signed to play for the Basket Liga Kobiet club AZS Poznań for the 2021–22 season.

=== Athletes Unlimited ===
Bradford appeared in Athletes Unlimited Pro Basketball in 2023, finishing 7th on the season. In 2024, she finished 3rd on the leaderboard.

== Career statistics ==
Legend
GP	Games played	GS	Games started	MPG	Minutes per game	RPG	Rebounds per game
APG	Assists per game	SPG	Steals per game	BPG	Blocks per game	PPG	Points per game
TO	Turnovers per game	FG%	Field-goal percentage	3P%	3-point field-goal percentage	FT%	Free-throw percentage
**Bold**	Career best	°	League leader

=== WNBA ===
Stats current through game on June 7, 2025

WNBA regular season statistics
Year	Team	GP	GS	MPG	FG%	3P%	FT%	RPG	APG	SPG	BPG	TO	PPG
2015	Los Angeles	15	1	9.5	.278	.231	**.714**	1.3	0.5	0.4	0.1	**0.3**	2.7
2016	Did not play (injury)												
2017	Did not appear in league												
2018	Did not appear in league												
2019	Did not play (waived)												
2020	Did not appear in league												
2021	Atlanta	**24**	**9**	**18.3**	**.429**	**.358**	.462	**3.8**	**1.5**	**1.2**	**0.4**	2.3	**8.8**
2025	Las Vegas	4	0	6.0	.333	.000	—	1.3	0.3	0.5	0.0	**0.3**	1.0
**Career**	3 years, 3 teams	39	10	14.9	.396	.327	.500	2.8	1.1	0.9	0.3	0.7	6.5

=== College ===
NCAA statistics
Year	Team	GP	GS	MPG	FG%	3P%	FT%	RPG	APG	SPG	BPG	TO	PPG
2011–12	Central Michigan	32	19	26.2	.420	.254	.510	8.4	2.4	2.2	**1.8**	**3.0**	14.2
2012–13	Central Michigan	**33**	**24**	28.2	**.432**	.309	.593	9.9	3.0	2.3	**1.8**	3.5	16.1
2013–14	Central Michigan	29	20	31.9	.408	**.323**	.516	**12.2**	**4.6**	**2.7**	1.3	3.8	**20.3**
2014–15	Central Michigan	22	19	**33.0**	.400	.252	**.667**	8.6	3.5	2.5	1.0	3.7	19.6
**Career**		116	82	29.5	.415	.292	.562	9.8	3.3	2.4	1.5	3.5	17.3
