= 2020 MAC women's basketball tournament =

- Classification: Division I
- Season: 2019–20
- Teams: 12
- First round site: Campus sites
- Quarterfinals site: Rocket Mortgage FieldHouse; Cleveland, Ohio
- Semifinals site: Rocket Mortgage FieldHouse; Cleveland, Ohio
- Finals site: Rocket Mortgage FieldHouse; Cleveland, Ohio
- Television: CBSSN, ESPN+
- MAC women's basketball tournaments

2019–20 Mid-American Conference women's basketball standings
	Conf.				Overall
Team	W		L	PCT	W		L	PCT
East
Kent State	11	–	7	.611	19	–	11	.633
Ohio	11	–	7	.611	19	–	11	.633
Buffalo	9	–	9	.500	19	–	12	.613
Akron	8	–	10	.444	15	–	15	.500
Miami (OH)	4	–	14	.222	11	–	20	.355
Bowling Green	3	–	15	.167	10	–	21	.323
West
Central Michigan	16	–	2	.889	23	–	7	.767
Ball State	13	–	5	.722	21	–	10	.677
Western Michigan	10	–	8	.556	18	–	13	.581
Eastern Michigan	9	–	9	.500	16	–	15	.516
Toledo	7	–	11	.389	14	–	17	.452
Northern Illinois	7	–	11	.389	11	–	19	.367
† 2020 MAC tournament winner Rankings from AP poll

The 2020 MAC women's basketball tournament was the postseason women's basketball tournament for the Mid-American Conference (MAC). The tournament's first-round games were held on campus sites at the higher seed on March 9, followed by the quarterfinals at Rocket Mortgage FieldHouse in Cleveland on March 11. The remaining rounds were to be held at Rocket Mortgage FieldHouse on March 13 and 14, and the champion was to receive the MAC's automatic bid to the NCAA tournament. Just prior to the first scheduled men's quarterfinal game on March 12, the conference announced that the remainder of both the men's and women's tournaments were canceled in response to concerns over the coronavirus pandemic. Later that day, the National Collegiate Athletic Association (NCAA) announced that all winter and spring sports championships were canceled.

== Schedule ==
Game	Time	Matchup	Score	Television
First round – Monday, March 9
1	7:00 pm	No. 9 Toledo vs. No. 8 Akron	63–59	ESPN+
2	7:00 pm	No. 12 Bowling Green at No. 5 Western Michigan	47–84	ESPN+
3	7:00 pm	No. 10 Northern Illinois vs. No. 7 Eastern Michigan	69–76	ESPN+
4	5:00 pm	No. 11 Miami at No. 6 Buffalo	72–87	ESPN+
Quarterfinals – Wednesday, March 11
5	Noon	No. 9 Toledo vs. No. 1 Central Michigan	78–69	ESPN+
6	2:30 pm	No. 5 Western Michigan vs. No. 4 Ohio	75–84	ESPN+
7	5:00 pm	No. 7 Eastern Michigan vs. No. 2 Ball State	64–63	ESPN+
8	7:30 pm	No. 3 Kent State vs. No. 6 Buffalo	72–66	ESPN+
Semifinals – Friday, March 13
9		No. 9 Toledo vs. No. 4 Ohio	Cancelled	
10		No. 7 Eastern Michigan vs. No. 3 Kent State	Cancelled	
Championship – Saturday, March 14
11		Game 9 winner vs. Game 10 winner	Cancelled	
Game times in ET. Rankings denote tournament seed

== Bracket ==
First round March 9
8	Akron	59
9	Toledo	63
5	Western Michigan	84
12	Bowling Green	47
7	Eastern Michigan	76
10	Northern Illinois	69
6	Buffalo	87
11	Miami	72

Quarterfinals; March 11
1	Central Michigan	69
9	Toledo	78
4	Ohio	84
5	Western Michigan	75
2	Ball State	63
7	Eastern Michigan	64
3	Kent State	72
6	Buffalo	66

Semifinals; March 13
9	Toledo
4	Ohio
7	Eastern Michigan
3	Kent State

Championship; March 14

== See also ==
- 2020 MAC men's basketball tournament
