= Central Michigan Chippewas women's basketball =

2026–27 Central Michigan Chippewas women's basketball team
- University: Central Michigan University
- Head coach: Kristin Haynie (4th season)
- Location: Mount Pleasant, Michigan
- Arena: McGuirk Arena (capacity: 5,300)
- Conference: Mid-American
- Nickname: Chippewas
- Colors: Maroon and gold
- Student section: Wildside

NCAA Division I tournament Sweet Sixteen
- 2018

NCAA Division I tournament appearances
- 1983, 1984, 2013, 2018, 2019, 2021

Conference tournament champions
- 1983, 1984, 2013, 2018, 2021

Conference regular-season champions
- 1984, 1985, 2017, 2018, 2019, 2020

Conference division champions
- 2014, 2016, 2017, 2018, 2019, 2020

Uniforms
Home	Away

The Central Michigan Chippewas women's basketball team is the intercollegiate women's basketball program representing Central Michigan University. The school competes in the Mid-American Conference (MAC) in Division I of the National Collegiate Athletic Association (NCAA). The Chippewas play home basketball games at the McGuirk Arena on the campus in Mount Pleasant, Michigan.

== History ==
The first season of Central Michigan women's basketball was the 1967–68 season. As of the 2023–24 season, the Chippewas have a 748–720 overall record with a 360–347 record in the MAC. The Chippewas have won 6 MAC regular season titles and 5 MAC division titles. They have won the Mid-American Conference women's basketball tournament in 1983, 1984, and 2013, while finishing runner-up in 1985, 1986, 1987, 1991, 2012, and 2016.

Season	Coach	Record	Conference record
1969–70	Fran Koenig	3–2	n/a
1970–71	Fran Koenig	7–4	n/a
1971–72	Fran Koenig	8–5	n/a
1972–73	Fran Koenig	4–6	n/a
1973–74	Fran Koenig	4–7	n/a
1974–75	Marcy Weston	10–7	n/a
1975–76	Marcy Weston	11–12	n/a
1976–77	Ro DiBrezzo	12–14	n/a
1977–78	Ro DiBrezzo	13–8	n/a
1978–79	Ro DiBrezzo	10–7	n/a
1979–80	Ro DiBrezzo	19–8	n/a
1980–81	Jane Cwayna	10–16	n/a
1981–82	Laura Golden	11–18	2–7 (10th)
1982–83	Laura Golden	21–9	12–6 (3rd)
1983–84	Laura Golden	27–3	18–0 (1st)
1984–85	Donita Davenport	19–10	15–3 (1st)
1985–86	Donita Davenport	18–11	13–5 (T-2nd)
1986–87	Donita Davenport	17–11	11–5 (2nd)
1987–88	Donita Davenport	16–13	11–5 (4th)
1988–89	Donita Davenport	11–18	7–9 (T-5th)
1989–90	Donita Davenport	14–14	7–9 (5th)
1990–91	Donita Davenport	21–8	11–5 (2nd)
1991–92	Donita Davenport	16–12	9–7 (4th)
1992–93	Donita Davenport	15–12	10–8 (T-5th)
1993–94	Donita Davenport	11–16	8–10 (7th)
1994–95	Donita Davenport	8–19	6–12 (7th)
1995–96	Donita Davenport	5–21	2–16 (9th)
1996–97	Fran Voll	11–16	7–11 (7th)
1997–98	Fran Voll	10–17	7–11 (T-2nd in West)
1998–99	Fran Voll	11–16	7–9 (T-4th in West)
1999-00	Fran Voll	9–19	6–10 (5th in West)
2000–01	Fran Voll (2–6); Ina Nicosia (2–18)	4–24	1–15 (7th in West)
2001–02	Eileen Kleinfelter	10–18	2–14 (6th in West)
2002–03	Eileen Kleinfelter	11–17	5–11 (T-6th in west)
2003–04	Eileen Kleinfelter	5–23	1–15 (7th in West)
2004–05	Eileen Kleinfelter	10–18	4–12 (T-6th in West)
2005–06	Eileen Kleinfelter	16–12	7–9 (T-4th in West)
2006–07	Eileen Kleinfelter	11–19	3–13 (6th in West)
2007–08	Sue Guevara	7–22	2–13 (6th in West)
2008–09	Sue Guevara	18–14	9–7 (4th in West)
2009–10	Sue Guevara	12–18	8–8 (3rd in West)
2010–11	Sue Guevara	20–11	11–5 (2nd in West)
2011–12	Sue Guevara	20–16	8–8 (3rd in West)
2012–13	Sue Guevara	21–12	12–4 (2nd in West)
2013–14	Sue Guevara	20–12	16–2 (1st in West)
2014–15	Sue Guevara	13–18	7–11 (6th in West)
2015–16	Sue Guevara	22–11	14–4 (1st in West)
2016–17	Sue Guevara	23–9	15–3 (1st in West)
2017–18	Sue Guevara	30–5	17–1 (1st in West)
2018–19	Sue Guevara	25–8	15–3 (1st in West)
2019–20	Heather Oesterle	22–5	15–1 (1st)
2020–21	Heather Oesterle	18–9	13–6 (2nd)
2021–22	Heather Oesterle	4–25	2–18 (12th)
2022–23	Heather Oesterle	6–23	4–14 (t-11th)
2023–24	Kristin Haynie	6–22	4–14 (11th)
2024–25	Kristin Haynie	14–17	9–9 (7th)

== NCAA tournament results ==
Year	Seed	Round	Opponent	Result
1983	#6	First Round	#3 Maryland	L 71–94
1984	#7	First Round	#2 Alabama	L 70–78
2013	#11	First Round	#6 Oklahoma	L 73–78
2018	#11	First Round; Second Round; Sweet Sixteen	#6 LSU #3 Ohio State #2 Oregon	W 78–69; W 95–78; L 68–83
2019	#8	First Round	#9 Michigan State	L 88–89
2021	#12	First Round	#5 Iowa	L 72–87
