= 2013–14 Kansas State Wildcats women's basketball team =

Intercollegiate basketball season

2013–14 Kansas State Wildcats women's basketball
- Conference: Big 12 Conference
- Record: 11–19 (5–13 Big 12)
- Head coach: Deb Patterson (18th season)
- Assistant coaches: Kamie Ethridge; Kelly Moylan; Shalee Lehning
- Home arena: Bramlage Coliseum

2013–14 Big 12 Conference women's basketball standings
	Conf.				Overall
Team	W		L	PCT	W		L	PCT
No. 5 Baylor †	16	–	2	.889	32	–	5	.865
No. 7 West Virginia	16	–	2	.889	30	–	5	.857
Texas	11	–	7	.611	22	–	12	.647
No. 21 Oklahoma State	11	–	7	.611	25	–	9	.735
Iowa State	9	–	9	.500	20	–	11	.645
Oklahoma	9	–	9	.500	18	–	15	.545
TCU	8	–	10	.444	18	–	15	.545
Kansas	5	–	13	.278	13	–	19	.406
Kansas State	5	–	13	.278	11	–	19	.367
Texas Tech	0	–	18	.000	6	–	24	.200
† 2014 Big 12 Tournament winner Rankings from AP poll

The 2013–14 Kansas State Wildcats women's basketball team represented Kansas State University in the 2013–14 NCAA Division I women's basketball season. This was head coach Deb Patterson's eighteenth season at Kansas State. They played their home games at Bramlage Coliseum in Manhattan, Kansas and were members of the Big 12 Conference. They finished the season with a record of 11–19 overall, 5–13 in Big 12 play for a tie to finish in eighth place. They lost in the first round of the 2014 Big 12 Conference women's basketball tournament to in-state rival Kansas.

== Roster ==
2013–14 Kansas State Wildcats women's basketball team
Players
Coaches

Pos.	#	Name	Height	Year	Previous school	Hometown
F	0	Jessica Sheble	6 ft 3 in (1.91 m)	Fr	Olathe North	Olathe, KS
G	1	Haley Texada	5 ft 7 in (1.7 m)	Jr	Wakeland	Frisco, TX
F	2	Erica Young	6 ft 3 in (1.91 m)	Fr	Tampa Bay Tech	Tampa, FL
F	4	Katya Leick	6 ft 1 in (1.85 m)	RS Sr	Park; Nebraska	Grey Cloud Township, MN
G	10	Leticia Romero	5 ft 8 in (1.73 m)	Fr	I.E.S. Joaquin Artiles	Las Palmas, Spain
G/F	11	Chantay Caron	5 ft 11 in (1.8 m)	Sr	Free State	Lawrence, KS
G	12	Kelly Thomson	5 ft 10 in (1.78 m)	RS Fr	Riley County	Riley, KS
G	15	Heidi Brown	5 ft 11 in (1.8 m)	Jr	Southwestern Heights	Plains, KS
G	20	Bri Craig	5 ft 10 in (1.78 m)	So	Lincoln Northeast	Lincoln, NE
F	21	Ashlynn Knoll	5 ft 11 in (1.8 m)	Sr	Happy; Seward County CC	Canyon, TX
F	22	Breanna Lewis	6 ft 5 in (1.96 m)	Fr	Riverside	Milwaukee, WI
G	23	Ashia Woods	5 ft 11 in (1.8 m)	Jr	Wichita Collegiate	Wichita, KS
G	24	Kindred Wesemann	5 ft 5 in (1.65 m)	Fr	Pleasant Hill	Pleasant Hill, MO
F	25	Stacey Malone	6 ft 1 in (1.85 m)	RS Fr	Robert E. Lee	Tyler, TX
G	32	Jai Murphy	5 ft 9 in (1.75 m)	Fr	Brentwood Academy	Nashville, TN

Head coach

- Deb Patterson (Rockford)

Assistant coach(es)

- Kamie Ethridge (Texas)
- Kelly Moylan (Kansas State)
- Shalee Lehning (Kansas State)

Legend

- (C) Team captain
- (S) Suspended
- (I) Ineligible
- (W) Walk-on
- Injured
- Current redshirt

== Schedule and results ==
Date time, TV	Rank^{#}	Opponent^{#}	Result	Record	Site (attendance) city, state
Exhibition
10/28/2013*; 7:00 pm, Metro Sports		Washburn	W 85–64	–	Bramlage Coliseum (3,617); Manhattan, KS
11/01/2013*; 5:45 pm, K-StateHD.TV		Alaska Anchorage	W 73–65	–	Bramlage Coliseum (3,924); Manhattan, KS
Regular Season
11/08/2013*; 5:45 pm, K-StateHD.TV		Tennessee State	W 89–53	1–0	Bramlage Coliseum (3,284); Manhattan, KS
11/10/2013*; 12:30 pm, K-StateHD.TV		Charlotte	W 73–65	2–0	Bramlage Coliseum (3,780); Manhattan, KS
11/16/2013*; 3:00 pm		at UTEP	L 39–84	2–1	Don Haskins Center (1,061); El Paso, TX
11/20/2013*; 7:00 pm, Metro Sports		Wichita State	L 46–69	2–2	Bramlage Coliseum (3,914); Manhattan, KS
11/28/2013*; 3:15 pm		vs. SMU; Junkanoo Jam	L 57–68	2–3	St. George High School Gymnasium (N/A); Freeport, BAH
11/29/2013*; 4:45 pm		vs. Virginia; Junkanoo Jam	W 49–46	3–3	St. George High School Gymnasium (N/A); Freeport, BAH
12/07/2013*; 2:20 pm, FCS		Grambling State	W 83–50	4–3	Bramlage Coliseum (3,947); Manhattan, KS
12/15/2013*; 1:00 pm, FCS		UC Santa Barbara	W 73–64	5–3	Bramlage Coliseum (3,758); Manhattan, KS
12/21/2013*; 3:00 pm		at Hampton	L 75–86 ^{2OT}	5–4	Hampton Convocation Center (587); Hampton, VA
12/28/2013*; 6:30 pm		vs. NC State; Surf and Slam Classic	L 60–77	5–5	Viejas Arena (422); San Diego, CA
12/30/2013*; 5:30 pm		vs. UC Riverside; Surf and Slam Classic	W 74–42	6–5	Viejas Arena (261); San Diego, CA
01/02/2014; 7:00 pm, FSKC		No. 9 Baylor	L 63–92	6–6 (0–1)	Bramlage Coliseum (3,942); Manhattan, KS
01/05/2014; 2:00 pm, LHN		at Texas	L 53–67	6–7 (0–2)	Frank Erwin Center (2,994); Austin, TX
01/08/2014; 7:00 pm, FCS		No. 15 Oklahoma State	L 51–58	6–8 (0–3)	Bramlage Coliseum (3,793); Manhattan, KS
01/11/2014; 7:00 pm, SSTV		at Oklahoma	L 50–61	6–9 (0–4)	Lloyd Noble Center (5,700); Norman, OK
01/14/2014; 7:00 pm		at Texas Tech	W 72–65	7–9 (1–4)	United Spirit Arena (3,686); Lubbock, TX
01/18/2014; 7:00 pm, FSKC		No. 13 Iowa State	W 80–74	8–9 (2–4)	Bramlage Coliseum (8,221); Manhattan, KS
01/22/2014; 7:00 pm		at No. 10 Baylor	L 48–71	8–10 (2–5)	Ferrell Center (6,471); Waco, TX
01/25/2014; 7:00 pm, FSN		Kansas; Sunflower Showdown	L 64–71	8–11 (2–6)	Bramlage Coliseum (6,337); Manhattan, KS
01/29/2014; 7:00 pm, FSKC		Oklahoma	W 86–78	9–11 (3–6)	Bramlage Coliseum (4,306); Manhattan, KS
02/01/2014; 8:00 pm		at No. 23 Iowa State	L 65–84	9–12 (3–7)	Hilton Coliseum (11,480); Ames, IA
02/08/2014; 1:00 pm		at No. 18 West Virginia	L 44–84	9–13 (3–8)	WVU Coliseum (4,112); Morgantown, WV
02/12/2014; 7:00 pm, FSKC		Texas	L 63–69	9–14 (3–9)	Bramlage Coliseum (4,098); Manhattan, KS
02/15/2014; 2:00 pm, FCS		Texas Tech	W 60–54	10–14 (4–9)	Bramlage Coliseum (4,933); Manhattan, KS
02/19/2014; 7:00 pm, FSSW+		at TCU	L 44–64	10–15 (4–10)	Daniel–Meyer Coliseum (2,347); Ft. Worth, TX
02/22/2014; 7:00 pm, FCS		No. 13 West Virginia	L 40–61	10–16 (4–11)	Bramlage Coliseum (4,452); Manhattan, KS
02/26/2014; 7:00 pm		at Kansas; Sunflower Showdown	W 76–68	11–16 (5–11)	Allen Fieldhouse (3,588); Lawrence, KS
03/01/2014; 2:00 pm		at No. 15 Oklahoma State	L 62–67	11–17 (5–12)	Gallagher-Iba Arena (3,748); Stillwater, OK
03/03/2014; 7:00 pm, FSMW		TCU	L 46–51	11–18 (5–13)	Bramlage Coliseum (4,010); Manhattan, KS
2014 Big 12 Conference women's basketball tournament
03/07/2014; 6:00 pm, FCS		vs. Kansas; First Round	L 84–87	11–19	Chesapeake Energy Arena (N/A); Oklahoma City, OK
*Non-conference game. ^{#}Rankings from AP Poll / Coaches' Poll. (#) Tournament seedings in parentheses. All times are in Central Time.

== See also ==
- 2013–14 Kansas State Wildcats men's basketball team
