= 2013–14 Texas Tech Lady Raiders basketball team =

Intercollegiate basketball season

2013–14 Texas Tech Lady Raiders basketball
- Conference: Big 12 Conference
- Record: 6–24 (0–18 Big 12)
- Head coach: Candi Whitaker (1st season)
- Assistant coaches: Matt Corkery; Brett Schneider; Damitria Buchanan
- Home arena: United Spirit Arena

2013–14 Big 12 Conference women's basketball standings
	Conf.				Overall
Team	W		L	PCT	W		L	PCT
No. 5 Baylor †	16	–	2	.889	32	–	5	.865
No. 7 West Virginia	16	–	2	.889	30	–	5	.857
Texas	11	–	7	.611	22	–	12	.647
No. 21 Oklahoma State	11	–	7	.611	25	–	9	.735
Iowa State	9	–	9	.500	20	–	11	.645
Oklahoma	9	–	9	.500	18	–	15	.545
TCU	8	–	10	.444	18	–	15	.545
Kansas	5	–	13	.278	13	–	19	.406
Kansas State	5	–	13	.278	11	–	19	.367
Texas Tech	0	–	18	.000	6	–	24	.200
† 2014 Big 12 Tournament winner Rankings from AP poll

The 2013–14 Texas Tech Lady Raiders basketball team represented Texas Tech University in the 2013–14 college basketball season. It was head coach Candi Whitaker's first season at Texas Tech. The Lady Raiders, were members of the Big 12 Conference and played their home games at the United Spirit Arena. They finished with the season with a record of 6–24 overall, 0–18 in Big 12 play to finish in last place. They lost in the first round to TCU in the 2014 Big 12 women's basketball tournament.

== Rankings ==
Regular season polls
Poll	Pre- Season	Week 1	Week 2	Week 3	Week 4	Week 5	Week 6	Week 7	Week 8	Week 9	Week 10	Week 11	Week 12	Week 13	Week 14	Week 15	Week 16	Week 17	Week 18	Final
AP																				
Coaches																				

Legend
	Increase in ranking
	Decrease in ranking
	No change
(RV)	Received votes
(NR)	Not ranked

== Before the season ==
=== Departures ===
Name	Number	Pos.	Height	Year	Hometown	Notes
Chynna Brown	0	G	5'8"	Senior	Dallas, Texas	Graduated
Christine Hyde	5	G	5'10"	Senior	Brampton, Ontario, Canada	Graduated
Casey Morris	15	G	5'9"	Senior	Fairfield, California	Graduated
Monique Smalls	23	G	5'6"	Senior	The Woodlands, Texas	Graduated
Mary Bokenkamp	24	G	5'9"	Senior	Parker, Colorado	Graduated

=== Recruiting ===
Recruiting information will be posted as soon as it is made available on the Texas Tech website.

== 2013–14 media ==
=== Television & Radio information ===
Select Lady Raiders games will be shown on FSN affiliates throughout the season, including FSSW, FSSW+, and FCS Atlantic, Central, and Pacific. All games will be broadcast on the Lady Raiders Radio Network on either KLZK or KJTV.

== Roster ==
2013–14 Texas Tech Lady Raiders women's basketball team
Players
Coaches

Pos.	#	Name	Height	Year	Previous school	Hometown
G	2	Ivonne Cook-Taylor	5 ft 8 in (1.73 m)	RS Fr	Terra Nova	San Francisco, Calif.
G	3	Minta Spears	5 ft 10 in (1.78 m)	RS Fr	Bullard	Bullard, Texas
G	4	Jamaika Hughes	5 ft 10 in (1.78 m)	Fr	Kennedale	Fort Worth, Texas
G	5	Diamond Lockhart	5 ft 5 in (1.65 m)	Fr	Red Oak	Red Oak, Texas
G	12	Amber Battle	5 ft 9 in (1.75 m)	Jr	Cibola	Albuquerque, N.M.
F/C	13	Kellyn Schneider	6 ft 5 in (1.96 m)	So	Monterey	Lubbock, Texas
G	23	Jasmine Caston	5 ft 10 in (1.78 m)	Fr	Plano East	Plano, Texas
G	24	Audrisa Harrison	5 ft 10 in (1.78 m)	Jr	Coldspring	Point Blank, Texas
C	31	Haley Schneider	6 ft 5 in (1.96 m)	Sr	Monterey	Lubbock, Texas
F/C	33	Shauntal Nobles	6 ft 3 in (1.91 m)	RS Sr	Northwest	Haslet, Texas
F	41	Kelsi Baker	6 ft 0 in (1.83 m)	Sr	John Horn	Mesquite, Texas
F	42	Jackie Patterson	6 ft 1 in (1.85 m)	Sr	Frisco Wakeland	Frisco, Texas

Head coach

Candi Whitaker

Assistant coach(es)

Matt Corkery
Brett Schneider
Damitria Buchanan

Legend

- (C) Team captain
- (S) Suspended
- (I) Ineligible
- (W) Walk-on
- Injured
- Current redshirt

Roster
Last update: 2013-08-16

== Schedule ==
Date time, TV	Opponent	Result	Record	Site (attendance) city, state
Exhibition
11/04/2013*; 7:00 pm	Angelo State	W 73–51	-	United Spirit Arena (1,586); Lubbock, TX
Non-conference regular season
11/10/2013*; 4:00 pm, FSSW	Texas–Pan American	W 70–48	1–0	United Spirit Arena (3,400); Lubbock, TX
11/13/2013*; 7:00 pm	New Mexico	W 64–56	2–0	United Spirit Arena (3,345); Lubbock, TX
11/17/2013*; 2:00 pm	Arizona State	L 77–85	2–1	United Spirit Arena (3,413); Lubbock, TX
11/23/2013*; 2:00 pm	Grambling State	W 86–68	3–1	United Spirit Arena (3,369); Lubbock, TX
11/29/2013*; 9:30 am	vs. Michigan; Barclays Women's Invitational	L 71–82	3–2	Barclays Center (N/A); Brooklyn, NY
11/30/2013*; 6:30 pm	vs. Rutgers; Barclays Women's Invitational	L 52–61	3–3	Barclays Center (N/A); Brooklyn, NY
12/04/2013*; 7:00 pm, FCS	Arkansas–Pine Bluff	W 58–50	4–3	United Spirit Arena (3,410); Lubbock, TX
12/15/2013*; 1:00 pm, P12N	at Arizona	L 56–65	4–4	McKale Center (1,294); Tucson, AZ
12/20/2013*; 6:00 pm	Jacksonville; World Vision Challenge	W 62–48	5–4	United Spirit Arena (3,914); Lubbock, TX
12/21/2013*; 2:00 pm	Florida Atlantic; World Vision Challenge	W 76–63	6–4	United Spirit Arena (4,328); Lubbock, TX
12/22/2013*; 2:00 pm	Abilene Christian; World Vision Challenge	L 57–58	6–5	United Spirit Arena (4,089); Lubbock, TX
Big 12 Regular Season
01/02/2014; 6:30 pm	Oklahoma	L 38–68	6–6 (0–1)	United Spirit Arena (4,413); Lubbock, TX
01/05/2014; 2:00 pm, FSSW	TCU	L 54–65	6–7 (0–2)	United Spirit Arena (4,016); Lubbock, TX
01/08/2014; 7:00 pm	at No. 11 Iowa State	L 48–74	6–8 (0–3)	Hilton Coliseum (7,089); Ames, IA
01/11/2014; 7:00 pm	at Kansas	L 46–67	6–9 (0–4)	Allen Fieldhouse (2,063); Manhattan, KS
01/14/2014; 7:00 pm, FSSW+	Kansas State	L 65–72	6–10 (0–5)	United Spirit Arena (3,686); Lubbock, TX
01/18/2014; 12:00 pm	at No. 11 Oklahoma State	L 56–82	6–11 (0–6)	Gallagher-Iba Arena (2,626); Stillwater, OK
01/22/2014; 6:30 pm	No. 18 West Virginia	L 51–70	6–12 (0–7)	United Spirit Arena (3,757); Lubbock, TX
01/25/2014; 7:00 pm, FSSW+	No. 20 Iowa State	L 76–85 ^{OT}	6–13 (0–8)	United Spirit Arena (3,937); Lubbock, TX
01/29/2014; 7:00 pm	at No. 9 Baylor	L 43–92	6–14 (0–9)	Ferrell Center (6,736); Waco, TX
02/01/2014; 4:00 pm, FSSW	Kansas	L 62–70	6–15 (0–10)	United Spirit Arena (3,833); Lubbock, TX
02/05/2014; 7:00 pm, LHN	at Texas	L 55–81	6–16 (0–11)	Frank Erwin Center (3,311); Austin, TX
02/08/2014; 12:00 pm, FSN	at TCU	L 57–72	6–17 (0–12)	Daniel-Meyer Coliseum (2,511); Ft. Worth, TX
02/12/2014; 6:30 pm	No. 7 Baylor	L 58–75	6–18 (0–13)	United Spirit Arena (4,390); Lubbock, TX
02/15/2014; 7:00 pm	at Kansas State	L 54–60	6–19 (0–14)	Bramlage Coliseum (4,933); Manhattan, KS
02/23/2014; 2:00 pm, FSN	No. 12 Oklahoma State	L 62–63	6–20 (0–15)	United Spirit Arena (4,726); Lubbock, TX
02/26/2014; 6:00 pm	at No. 11 West Virginia	L 37–69	6–21 (0–16)	WVU Coliseum (1,820); Morgantown, WV
03/01/2014; 2:00 pm	Texas	L 64–67	6–22 (0–17)	United Spirit Arena (4,021); Lubbock, TX
03/03/2014; 7:00 pm	at Oklahoma	L 32–87	6–23 (0–18)	Lloyd Noble Center (4,578); Norman, OK
Big 12 tournament
03/07/2014; 8:30 pm, FCS	vs. TCU; First Round	L 59–74	6–24	Chesapeake Energy Arena (4,579); Oklahoma City, OK
*Non-conference game. ^{#}Rankings from AP Poll. (#) Tournament seedings in parentheses. All times are in Central Time.

== See also ==
- Texas Tech Lady Raiders basketball
- 2013–14 Texas Tech Red Raiders basketball team
