= 2013–14 TCU Horned Frogs women's basketball team =

Intercollegiate basketball season

2013–14 TCU Horned Frogs women's basketball

WNIT, First Round
- Conference: Big 12 Conference
- Record: 18–15 (8–10 Big 12)
- Head coach: Jeff Mittie (15th season)
- Assistant coaches: Brian Ostermann; Ebony Gilliam; Chris Johnson
- Home arena: Daniel–Meyer Coliseum

2013–14 Big 12 Conference women's basketball standings
	Conf.				Overall
Team	W		L	PCT	W		L	PCT
No. 5 Baylor †	16	–	2	.889	32	–	5	.865
No. 7 West Virginia	16	–	2	.889	30	–	5	.857
Texas	11	–	7	.611	22	–	12	.647
No. 21 Oklahoma State	11	–	7	.611	25	–	9	.735
Iowa State	9	–	9	.500	20	–	11	.645
Oklahoma	9	–	9	.500	18	–	15	.545
TCU	8	–	10	.444	18	–	15	.545
Kansas	5	–	13	.278	13	–	19	.406
Kansas State	5	–	13	.278	11	–	19	.367
Texas Tech	0	–	18	.000	6	–	24	.200
† 2014 Big 12 Tournament winner Rankings from AP poll

The 2013–14 TCU Horned Frogs women's basketball team represented Texas Christian University in the 2013–14 NCAA Division I women's basketball season. This is head coach Jeff Mittie's fifteenth season at TCU. They played their home games at Daniel–Meyer Coliseum in Fort Worth, Texas and were members of the Big 12 Conference. They finished the season with a record of 18–15 overall, 8–10 in Big 12 play for a finish in seventh place. They lost in the quarterfinals in the 2014 Big 12 Conference women's basketball tournament to West Virginia. They were invited to the 2014 Women's National Invitation Tournament, where they lost in the first round to Colorado.

== Roster ==
2013–14 TCU Horned Frogs women's basketball team
Players
Coaches

Pos.	#	Name	Height	Year	Previous school	Hometown
G	2	Alexann Yancey	5 ft 8 in (1.73 m)	RS Sr	Plano West; Oklahoma	Plano, Texas
G/F	3	Veja Hamilton	5 ft 10 in (1.78 m)	Fr	Klein Collins	Spring, Texas
F	4	Chelsea Prince	5 ft 11 in (1.8 m)	Jr	Dunbar	Ft. Worth, Texas
G	5	Meagan Henson	5 ft 0 in (1.52 m)	Sr	Christian Heritage Academy	Yukon, Oklahoma
C	13	Klara Bradshaw	6 ft 6 in (1.98 m)	Fr	Rains	Emory, Texas
G	14	Zahna Medley	5 ft 6 in (1.68 m)	So	Springfield	Springfield, Illinois
G/F	15	Jada Butts	5 ft 8 in (1.73 m)	Fr	Lewisville	Lewisville, Texas
C	21	Latricia Lovings	6 ft 3 in (1.91 m)	Sr	Paschal	Ft. Worth, Texas
G	23	AJ Alix	5 ft 6 in (1.68 m)	Fr	Bellaire	Bellaire, Texas
G	24	Natalie Ventress	5 ft 10 in (1.78 m)	Jr	North Crowley	Ft. Worth, Texas
F	25	Janay Keys	6 ft 1 in (1.85 m)	Fr	Lamar	Arlington, Texas
F	32	Caitlin Diaz	6 ft 1 in (1.85 m)	So	Tomball	Houston, Texas
G	33	Donielle Breaux	5 ft 10 in (1.78 m)	Jr	Elkins; Kansas	Missouri City, Texas
G	34	Alexia Standish	5 ft 8 in (1.73 m)	Jr	Colleyville Heritage; Texas A&M	Colleyville, Texas
C	55	Carol Willie	6 ft 2 in (1.88 m)	Fr	Cypress	Houston, Texas

Head coach

- Jeff Mittie (Missouri Western)

Assistant coach(es)

- Brian Ostermann (UW–La Crosse)
- Ebony Gilliam (TCU)
- Chris Johnson (Houston Baptist)

Legend

- (C) Team captain
- (S) Suspended
- (I) Ineligible
- (W) Walk-on
- Injured
- Current redshirt

== Schedule and results ==
Date time, TV	Rank^{#}	Opponent^{#}	Result	Record	Site (attendance) city, state
Exhibition
11/04/2013*; 7:00 pm		Southern Arkansas	W 76–45	–	Daniel-Meyer Coliseum (540); Ft. Worth, Texas
Non-Conference Games
11/09/2013*; 7:00 pm		Louisiana-Monroe	W 86–47	1–0	Daniel-Meyer Coliseum (2,010); Ft. Worth, Texas
11/13/2013*; 7:00 pm		at SMU	L 68–72 ^{OT}	1–1	Curtis Culwell Center (438); Garland, Texas
11/16/2013*; 7:00 pm		Texas State	W 63–50	2–1	Daniel-Meyer Coliseum (2,001); Ft. Worth, Texas
11/18/2013*; 7:00 pm, FCS		Grambling State	W 95–64	3–1	Daniel-Meyer Coliseum (2,294); Ft. Worth, Texas
11/26/2013*; 6:30 pm		vs. Florida Gulf Coast; Hardwood Tournament of Hope	W 68–47	4–1	Puerto Vallarta International Convention Center (100); Puerto Vallarta, MX
11/27/2013*; 6:30 pm		vs. South Dakota State; Hardwood Tournament of Hope	L 52–57	4–2	Puerto Vallarta International Convention Center (N/A); Puerto Vallarta, MX
11/28/2013*; 6:30 pm		vs. Purdue; Hardwood Tournament of Hope	L 68–75	4–3	Puerto Vallarta International Convention Center (N/A); Puerto Vallarta, MX
12/04/2013*; 7:00 pm, FCS		Stephen F. Austin	W 60–52	5–3	Daniel-Meyer Coliseum (1,954); Ft. Worth, Texas
12/15/2013*; 4:00 pm, FSSW		Texas–Pan American	W 73–47	6–3	Daniel-Meyer Coliseum (1,844); Ft. Worth, Texas
12/18/2013*; 7:00 pm, FCS		Abilene Christian	W 82–55	7–3	Daniel-Meyer Coliseum (2,063); Ft. Worth, Texas
12/20/2013*; 7:00 pm		Sam Houston State	W 78–46	8–3	Daniel-Meyer Coliseum (1,789); Ft. Worth, Texas
12/28/2013*; 7:00 pm		Prairie View A&M	W 76–47	9–3	Daniel-Meyer Coliseum (1,859); Ft. Worth, Texas
Conference Games
01/02/2014; 7:00 pm		No. 14 Iowa State	L 49–71	9–4 (0–1)	Daniel-Meyer Coliseum (2,062); Ft. Worth, Texas
01/05/2014; 2:00 pm, FSSW		at Texas Tech	W 65–54	10–4 (1–1)	United Spirit Arena (4,016); Lubbock, Texas
01/08/2014; 7:00 pm		Kansas	W 52–50	11–4 (2–1)	Daniel-Meyer Coliseum (1,887); Ft. Worth, Texas
01/11/2014; 7:00 pm		at No. 7 Baylor	L 46–80	11–5 (2–2)	Ferrell Center (7,894); Waco, Texas
01/14/2014; 7:00 pm, FCS		at No. 11 Oklahoma State	L 53–65	11–6 (2–3)	Gallagher-Iba Arena (2,352); Stillwater, Oklahoma
01/19/2014; 1:00 pm, FSSW		Texas	W 54–48	12–6 (3–3)	Daniel-Meyer Coliseum (2,672); Ft. Worth, Texas
01/25/2014; 7:00 pm, SSTV		at Oklahoma	L 52–63	12–7 (3–4)	Lloyd Noble Center (5,301); Norman, Oklahoma
01/29/2014; 7:00 pm		Oklahoma State	L 48–49	12–8 (3–5)	Daniel-Meyer Coliseum (2,133); Ft. Worth, Texas
02/01/2014; 7:00 pm		No. 20 West Virginia	L 62–66	12–9 (3–6)	Daniel-Meyer Coliseum (2,029); Ft. Worth, Texas
02/05/2014; 7:00 pm		at No. 23 Iowa State	W 61–60	13–9 (4–6)	Hilton Coliseum (10,028); Ames, Iowa
02/08/2014; 12:00 pm, FSN		Texas Tech	W 72–57	14–9 (5–6)	Daniel-Meyer Coliseum (2,511); Ft. Worth, Texas
02/12/2014; 7:00 pm, ESPN3		at Kansas	L 53–62	14–10 (5–7)	Allen Fieldhouse (1,504); Manhattan, Kansas
02/16/2014; 12:00 pm		at No. 13 West Virginia	L 57–61	14–11 (5–8)	WVU Coliseum (6,161); Morgantown, West Virginia
02/19/2014; 7:00 pm, FSSW+		Kansas State	W 64–44	15–11 (6–8)	Daniel-Meyer Coliseum (2,347); Ft. Worth, Texas
02/22/2014; 11:00 am, FSSW		Baylor	L 46–69	15–12 (6–9)	Daniel-Meyer Coliseum (3,372); Ft. Worth, Texas
02/25/2014; 7:30 pm, LHN		at Texas	L 50–62	15–13 (6–10)	Frank Erwin Center (2,691); Austin, Texas
03/01/2014; 7:00 pm, FSSW+		Oklahoma	W 76–66	16–13 (7–10)	Daniel-Meyer Coliseum (2,406); Ft. Worth, Texas
03/03/2014; 7:00 pm, FSMW		at Kansas State	W 51–46	17–13 (8–10)	Bramlage Coliseum (4,010); Manhattan, Kansas
2014 Big 12 Conference women's basketball tournament
03/07/2014; 8:30 pm, FCS		vs. Texas Tech; First Round	W 75–59	18–13	Chesapeake Energy Arena (4,579); Oklahoma City
03/08/2014; 6:00 pm, FSN		vs. West Virginia; Quarterfinals	L 59–67	18–14	Chesapeake Energy Arena (N/A); Oklahoma City
WNIT
03/19/2014*; 8:00 pm		at Colorado; First Round	L 71–78	18–15	Coors Events Center (789); Boulder, Colorado
*Non-conference game. ^{#}Rankings from AP Poll / Coaches' Poll. (#) Tournament seedings in parentheses. All times are in Central Time.

== See also ==
- 2013–14 TCU Horned Frogs basketball team
