= 2014 Big 12 Conference women's basketball tournament =

- Classification: Division I
- Season: 2013–14
- Teams: 10
- Site: Chesapeake Energy Arena; Oklahoma City, Oklahoma
- Champions: Baylor (6th title)
- Winning coach: Kim Mulkey (6th title)
- MVP: Nina Davis (Baylor)
- Attendance: 24,387 (overall); 4,710 (championship)
- Television: FCS, FSN, FS1

2013–14 Big 12 Conference women's basketball standings
	Conf.				Overall
Team	W		L	PCT	W		L	PCT
No. 5 Baylor †	16	–	2	.889	32	–	5	.865
No. 7 West Virginia	16	–	2	.889	30	–	5	.857
Texas	11	–	7	.611	22	–	12	.647
No. 21 Oklahoma State	11	–	7	.611	25	–	9	.735
Iowa State	9	–	9	.500	20	–	11	.645
Oklahoma	9	–	9	.500	18	–	15	.545
TCU	8	–	10	.444	18	–	15	.545
Kansas	5	–	13	.278	13	–	19	.406
Kansas State	5	–	13	.278	11	–	19	.367
Texas Tech	0	–	18	.000	6	–	24	.200
† 2014 Big 12 Tournament winner Rankings from AP poll

The 2014 Big 12 Conference women's basketball tournament was the postseason women's basketball tournament for the Big 12 Conference, held from March 7 to 10 in Oklahoma City at Chesapeake Energy Arena.

The 2014 tournament is already guaranteed to make history as for the first time ever, every game will be televised nationally.

== Seeds ==
2014 Big 12 Conference women's basketball tournament seeds
Seed	School	Conf.	Over.	Tiebreaker
1	‡ – Baylor	16-2	26-4	2-0 vs. Texas
2	† – West Virginia	16-2	27-3	1-1 vs. Texas
3	# – Texas	11-7	20-10	2-0 vs. Oklahoma State
4	# – Oklahoma State	11-7	22-7	0-2 vs. Texas
5	# – Iowa State	9-9	20-9	RPI of 34
6	# – Oklahoma	9-9	18-13	RPI of 47
7	TCU	8-10	17-13	
8	Kansas	5-13	12-18	
9	Kansas State	5-15	11-18	
10	Texas Tech	0-18	6-23	
‡ – Big 12 regular season champions (tie), and tournament No. 1 seed. † – Big 12 regular season champions (tie), and received a single-bye in the conference tournament. # – Received a single-bye in the conference tournament. Overall records include all games played in the Big 12 Tournament.

== Schedule ==
Session	Game	Time	Matchup	Television	Attendance
First round – Friday, March 7
1	1	6:02 pm	#8 Kansas 87 vs #9 Kansas State 84 ^{OT}	FCS	4,579
1	2	8:52 pm	#7 TCU 75 vs #10 Texas Tech 59	FCS	4,579
Quarterfinals – Saturday, March 8
2	3	11:02 am	#4 Oklahoma State 67 vs #5 Iowa State 57	FSN	4,882
2	4	1:32 pm	#1 Baylor 81 vs #8 Kansas 47	FSN	4,882
3	5	6:02 pm	#2 West Virginia 67 vs #7 TCU 59	FSN	5,262
3	6	8:32 pm	#3 Texas 82 vs #6 Oklahoma 72	FSN	5,262
Semifinals – Sunday, March 9
4	7	2:02 pm	#1 Baylor 65 vs #4 Oklahoma State 61	FS1	4,954
4	8	4:32 pm	#2 West Virginia 67 vs #3 Texas 60	FS1	4,954
Final – Monday, March 10
5	9	8:02 pm	#1 Baylor 74 vs #2 West Virginia 71	FS1	4,710
Game times in CT. #-Rankings denote tournament seed

== Tournament ==
First round Friday, March 7
8	Kansas	87*
9	Kansas State	84
7	TCU	75
10	Texas Tech	59

Quarterfinals; Saturday, March 8
1	Baylor	81
8	Kansas	47
4	Oklahoma State	67
5	Iowa State	57
3	Texas	82
6	Oklahoma	72
2	West Virginia	67
7	TCU	59

Semifinals; Sunday, March 9
1	Baylor	65
4	Oklahoma State	61
3	Texas	60
2	West Virginia	67

Finals; Monday, March 10
1	Baylor	74
2	West Virginia	71

* – Denotes overtime

== All-Tournament team ==
Most Outstanding Player – Nina Davis, Baylor

Player	Team
Nina Davis	Baylor
Odyssey Sims	Baylor
Asya Bussie	West Virginia
Bria Holmes	West Virginia
Zahna Medley	TCU

== See also ==
- 2014 Big 12 Conference men's basketball tournament
- 2014 NCAA Women's Division I Basketball Tournament
- 2013–14 NCAA Division I women's basketball rankings
