= 2013–14 Baylor Lady Bears basketball team =

Intercollegiate basketball season

2013–14 Baylor Lady Bears basketball

Big 12 Tournament champions Big 12 regular season co-champions Athletes in Action champions

NCAA tournament, Elite Eight
- Conference: Big 12 Conference

Ranking
- Coaches: No. 6
- AP: No. 5
- Record: 32–5 (16–2 Big 12)
- Head coach: Kim Mulkey (13th season)
- Assistant coaches: Bill Brock; Sytia Messer; Toyelle Wilson
- Home arena: Ferrell Center

2013–14 Big 12 Conference women's basketball standings
	Conf.				Overall
Team	W		L	PCT	W		L	PCT
No. 5 Baylor †	16	–	2	.889	32	–	5	.865
No. 7 West Virginia	16	–	2	.889	30	–	5	.857
Texas	11	–	7	.611	22	–	12	.647
No. 21 Oklahoma State	11	–	7	.611	25	–	9	.735
Iowa State	9	–	9	.500	20	–	11	.645
Oklahoma	9	–	9	.500	18	–	15	.545
TCU	8	–	10	.444	18	–	15	.545
Kansas	5	–	13	.278	13	–	19	.406
Kansas State	5	–	13	.278	11	–	19	.367
Texas Tech	0	–	18	.000	6	–	24	.200
† 2014 Big 12 Tournament winner Rankings from AP poll

The 2013–14 Baylor Lady Bears basketball team represented Baylor University in the 2013–14 NCAA Division I women's basketball season. The Lady Bears, led by Hall of Famer head coach Kim Mulkey, played their home games at the Ferrell Center in Waco, Texas and were members of the Big 12 Conference.

They finished the season with a record of 32–5 overall, 16–2 in Big 12 play to share the regular season title with West Virginia. They won the 2014 Big 12 Conference women's basketball tournament to earn a trip to the 2014 NCAA Division I women's basketball tournament, where they defeated Western Kentucky in first round, California in the 2nd round, and Kentucky in the Sweet Sixteen before losing to Notre Dame in the Elite Eight.

== Before the season ==
=== Departures ===
Name	Number	Pos.	Height	Year	Hometown	Notes
Kimetria Hayden	1	G	6'0"	Senior	Dallas, TX	Graduated
Jordan Madden	3	G	6'0"	Senior	Lepanto, AR	Graduated
Destiny Williams	10	F	6'1"	RS Senior	Benton Harbor, Michigan	Graduated
Brooklyn Pope	32	F	6'1"	Graduate Senior	Fort Worth, TX	Graduated
Brittney Griner	42	F	6'8"	Senior	Houston, TX	Graduated; Entered 2013 WNBA draft; Drafted #1 by Phoenix Mercury

=== Recruiting ===
Name	Pos.	Height	Year	Hometown	Notes
Breanna Hayden	G	5'8"	Freshman	Dallas, TX	High School Graduate
Nina Davis	F	5'11"	Freshman	Memphis, TN	High School Graduate
Imani Wright	G	5'9"	Freshman	Hooks, TX	High School Graduate
Ieshia Small	G	6'0"	Freshman	Tallahassee, FL	High School Graduate
Khadijiah Cave	P	6'2"	Freshman	Augusta, GA	High School Graduate

== Roster ==
2013–14 Baylor Bears women's basketball team
Players
Coaches

Pos.	#	Name	Height	Year	Previous school	Hometown
G	0	Odyssey Sims	5 ft 8 in (1.73 m)	Sr	MacArthur	Irving, TX
G	1	Breanna Hayden	5 ft 8 in (1.73 m)	Fr	Madison	Dallas, TX
G	2	Niya Johnson	5 ft 8 in (1.73 m)	So	P.K. Yonge Development Research	Gainesville, FL
F	3	Chardonae Fuqua'	6 ft 0 in (1.83 m)	So	Hoover	Birmingham, AL
F	11	Mariah Chandler	6 ft 2 in (1.88 m)	GS	Southwest Atlanta Christian	Atlanta, GA
G	12	Alexis Prince	6 ft 1 in (1.85 m)	So	Edgewater	Orlando, FL
F	13	Nina Davis	6 ft 0 in (1.83 m)	So	Hoover	Birmingham, AL
G	14	Makenzie Robertson	5 ft 9 in (1.75 m)	Jr	Midway	McGregor, TX
G	20	Imani Wright	5 ft 9 in (1.75 m)	Fr	Liberty-Eylau	Hooks, TX
C	22	Sune Agbuke	6 ft 4 in (1.93 m)	Jr	Cornerstone Christian	San Antonio, TX
G	24	Ieshia Small	6 ft 0 in (1.83 m)	Fr	Florida	Tallahassee, FL
C	44	Kristina Higgins	6 ft 5 in (1.96 m)	Fr	Chapin	El Paso, TX
C	55	Khadijiah Cave	6 ft 2 in (1.88 m)	Fr	Lucy Laney	Augusta, GA

Head coach

- Kim Mulkey (Louisiana Tech)

Assistant coach(es)

- Bill Brock (SE Oklahoma State)
- Sytia Messer (Arkansas)
- Toyelle Wilson (Manhattan)

Legend

- (C) Team captain
- (S) Suspended
- (I) Ineligible
- (W) Walk-on
- Injured
- Current redshirt

Roster
Last update: 2013-08-13

== Rankings ==
Regular season polls
Poll	Pre- season	Week 2	Week 3	Week 4	Week 5	Week 6	Week 7	Week 8	Week 9	Week 10	Week 11	Week 12	Week 13	Week 14	Week 15	Week 16	Week 17	Week 18	Week 19	Final
AP	10	9	9	9	9	9	9	9	9	7	7	12	9	7	7	6	6	9	7	5
Coaches	10	9	9	9	9	9	9	9	9	7	7	10	7	6	4	5	5	9	6	6

Legend
	Increase in ranking
	Decrease in ranking
	No change
(RV)	Received votes
(NR)	Not ranked

== Schedule ==
Date time, TV	Rank^{#}	Opponent^{#}	Result	Record	Site (attendance) city, state
Exhibition
10/30/2013*; 7:00 pm	No. 10	Palm Beach Atlantic	W 111–52	–	Ferrell Center (6,311); Waco, TX
11/05/2013*; 7:00 pm	No. 10	Oklahoma City	W 91–49	–	Ferrell Center (6,194); Waco, TX
Non-conference Regular Season
11/09/2013*; 7:00 pm	No. 10	Grambling State	W 110–55	1–0	Ferrell Center (6,639); Waco, TX
11/14/2013*; 7:00 pm	No. 9	Nicholls State	W 111–58	2–0	Ferrell Center (6,333); Waco, TX
11/18/2013*; 7:00 pm, FSSW+	No. 9	Rice	W 79–46	3–0	Ferrell Center (6,516); Waco, TX
11/21/2013*; 7:00 pm	No. 9	Savannah State; Athletes in Action Classic	W 99–31	4–0	Ferrell Center (7,072); Waco, TX
11/22/2013*; 7:00 pm	No. 9	Northwestern State; Athletes in Action Classic	W 88–54	5–0	Ferrell Center (6,622); Waco, TX
11/23/2013*; 7:00 pm	No. 9	UTSA; Athletes in Action Classic	W 92–62	6–0	Ferrell Center (7,068); Waco, TX
12/03/2013*; 7:00 pm	No. 9	San Jose State	W 113–73	7–0	Ferrell Center (5,916); Waco, TX
12/06/2013*; 6:30 pm, ESPN3	No. 9	vs. No. 5 Kentucky	L 130–133 ^{4OT}	7–1	AT&T Stadium (N/A); Arlington, TX
12/15/2013*; 2:00 pm	No. 9	Houston Baptist	W 100–57	8–1	Ferrell Center (6,372); Waco, TX
12/18/2013*; 6:00 pm, FSSW+	No. 9	Ole Miss	W 87–80	9–1	Ferrell Center (6,723); Waco, TX
12/28/2013*; 7:00 pm	No. 9	McNeese State	W 82–57	10–1	Ferrell Center (6,927); Waco, TX
Big 12 Regular Season
01/02/2014; 7:00 pm	No. 9	at Kansas State	W 92–63	11–1 (1–0)	Bramlage Coliseum (3,942); Manhattan, KS
01/05/2014; 3:00 pm, FSN	No. 9	Kansas	W 75–55	12–1 (2–0)	Ferrell Center (6,381); Waco, TX
01/08/2014; 6:00 pm	No. 7	at West Virginia	W 78–62	13–1 (3–0)	WVU Coliseum (2,791); Morgantown, WV
01/11/2014; 7:00 pm	No. 7	TCU	W 80–46	14–1 (4–0)	Ferrell Center (7,984); Waco, TX
Non-conference Regular Season
01/13/2014*; 6:00 pm, ESPN2	No. 7	No. 1 Connecticut	L 55–66	14–2	Ferrell Center (9,145); Waco, TX
Big 12 Regular Season
01/19/2014; 2:00 pm, ESPN3	No. 7	at Kansas	L 60–76	14–3 (4–1)	Allen Fieldhouse (3,514); Manhattan, KS
01/22/2014; 7:00 pm	No. 12	Kansas State	W 71–48	15–3 (5–1)	Ferrell Center (6,471); Waco, TX
01/26/2014; 3:00 pm, FSN	No. 12	at No. 8 Oklahoma State	W 69–66 ^{OT}	16–3 (6–1)	Gallagher-Iba Arena (4,953); Stillwater, OK
01/29/2014; 7:00 pm, FSSW+	No. 9	Texas Tech	W 92–43	17–3 (7–1)	Ferrell Center (6,736); Waco, TX
02/01/2014; 6:30 pm, FSSW	No. 9	Texas	W 87–73	18–3 (8–1)	Ferrell Center (7,793); Waco, TX
02/03/2014; 3:00 pm, ESPN2	No. 7	at Oklahoma	W 81–67	19–3 (9–1)	Lloyd Noble Center (5,221); Norman, OK
02/09/2014; 3:00 pm, ESPN2	No. 7	No. 12 Oklahoma State	W 81–64	20–3 (10–1)	Ferrell Center (7,113); Waco, TX
02/12/2014; 6:30 pm	No. 7	at Texas Tech	W 75–58	21–3 (11–1)	United Spirit Arena (4,390); Lubbock, TX
02/16/2014; 12:00 pm, FS1	No. 7	at Texas	W 72–56	22–3 (12–1)	Frank Erwin Center (5,804); Austin, TX
02/19/2014; 7:00 pm, FCS Central	No. 6	Iowa State	W 89–51	23–3 (13–1)	Ferrell Center (6,758); Waco, TX
02/22/2014; 7:00 pm	No. 6	at TCU	W 69–46	24–3 (14–1)	Daniel-Meyer Coliseum (3,372); Ft. Worth, TX
02/24/2014; 6:00 pm, FS1	No. 6	Oklahoma	W 96–89	25–3 (15–1)	Ferrell Center (6,808); Waco, TX
03/02/2014; 1:00 pm, FS1	No. 6	No. 11 West Virginia	L 69–71	25–4 (15–2)	Ferrell Center (8,242); Waco, TX
03/04/2014; 7:00 pm, Cyclones.tv	No. 9	at Iowa State	W 70–54	26–4 (16–2)	Hilton Coliseum (10,539); Ames, IA
2014 Big 12 women's basketball tournament
03/08/2014; 1:30 pm, FSN	No. 9	vs. Kansas; Quarterfinals	W 81–47	27–4	Chesapeake Energy Arena (4,882); Oklahoma City, OK
03/09/2014; 2:00 pm, FS1	No. 9	vs. No. 18 Oklahoma State; Semifinals	W 65–61	28–4	Chesapeake Energy Arena (N/A); Oklahoma City, OK
03/10/2014; 8:00 pm, FS1	No. 7	vs. No. 5 West Virginia; Championship Game	W 74–71	29–4	Chesapeake Energy Arena (4,710); Oklahoma City, OK
2014 Women's NCAA tournament
03/22/2014*; 5:30 pm, ESPN2	No. 5	Western Kentucky; First Round	W 87–74	30–4	Ferrell Center (6,207); Waco, TX
03/24/2014*; 8:15 pm, ESPN2	No. 5	No. 24 California; Second Round	W 75–56	31–4	Ferrell Center (5,648); Waco, TX
03/29/2014*; 11:00 am, ESPN	No. 5	vs. No. 10 Kentucky; Sweet Sixteen	W 90–72	32–4	Edmund P. Joyce Center (N/A); South Bend, IN
03/31/2014*; 6:00 pm, ESPN	No. 5	at No. 2 Notre Dame; Elite Eight	L 69–88	32–5	Edmund P. Joyce Center (8,774); South Bend, IN
*Non-conference game. ^{#}Rankings from AP Poll. (#) Tournament seedings in parentheses. All times are in Central Time.

== See also ==
- 2013–14 Baylor Bears basketball team
