= 2013–14 Kansas Jayhawks women's basketball team =

Intercollegiate basketball season

2013–14 Kansas Jayhawks women's basketball
- Conference: Big 12 Conference
- Record: 13–19 (5–13 Big 12)
- Head coach: Bonnie Henrickson (10th season)
- Assistant coaches: Katie O'Connor; Mahogany Green; Shay Robinson
- Home arena: Allen Fieldhouse

2013–14 Big 12 Conference women's basketball standings
	Conf.				Overall
Team	W		L	PCT	W		L	PCT
No. 5 Baylor †	16	–	2	.889	32	–	5	.865
No. 7 West Virginia	16	–	2	.889	30	–	5	.857
Texas	11	–	7	.611	22	–	12	.647
No. 21 Oklahoma State	11	–	7	.611	25	–	9	.735
Iowa State	9	–	9	.500	20	–	11	.645
Oklahoma	9	–	9	.500	18	–	15	.545
TCU	8	–	10	.444	18	–	15	.545
Kansas	5	–	13	.278	13	–	19	.406
Kansas State	5	–	13	.278	11	–	19	.367
Texas Tech	0	–	18	.000	6	–	24	.200
† 2014 Big 12 Tournament winner Rankings from AP poll

The 2013–14 Kansas Jayhawks women's basketball team represented the University of Kansas in the 2013–14 NCAA Division I women's basketball season. It was head coach Bonnie Henrickson's tenth season at Kansas. Home games were played at Allen Fieldhouse in Lawrence. They finished the season with a record of 13–19 overall, and their Big 12 Conference record was 5–13 for a tie to finish in eighth place. They lost in the quarterfinals in the 2014 Big 12 women's basketball tournament to Baylor.

== Roster ==
2013–14 Kansas Jayhawks women's basketball team
Players
Coaches

Pos.	#	Name	Height	Year	Previous school	Hometown
G	0	Alisa Boyd	6 ft 1 in (1.85 m)	Jr	Renaissance	Detroit, MI
G	1	Lamaria Cole	5 ft 6 in (1.68 m)	So	Rudder	Bryan, TX
G	2	Dakota Gonzales	6 ft 0 in (1.83 m)	Fr	Highland	Pocatello, ID
G	3	Dylan Gonzales	6 ft 0 in (1.83 m)	Fr	Highland	Pocatello, ID
F	4	Jada Brown	6 ft 0 in (1.83 m)	Fr	Centennial	Las Vegas, NV
F	5	Catherine (Bunny) Williams	6 ft 1 in (1.85 m)	Jr	Duncanville	Duncanville, TX
F	15	Chelsea Gardner	6 ft 3 in (1.91 m)	Jr	DeSoto	DeSoto, TX
G	24	Charlicia (Cece) Harper	5 ft 8 in (1.73 m)	Sr	Madison	San Antonio, TX
F	25	Caelynn Manning-Allen	6 ft 4 in (1.93 m)	Fr	Curie	Chicago, IL
G	32	Keyla Morgan	5 ft 8 in (1.73 m)	Fr	Long Beach Poly	Rancho Dominguez, CA
G	42	Natalie Knight	5 ft 7 in (1.7 m)	Jr	Olathe South	Olathe, KS
G	54	Markisha Hawkins	5 ft 9 in (1.75 m)	Sr	North Little Rock	Little Rock, AR

Head coach

- Bonnie Henrickson (St. Cloud State)

Assistant coach(es)

- Katie O'Connor (Virginia Tech)
- Mahogany Green (Cleveland State)
- Shay Robinson (Central Florida)

Legend

- (C) Team captain
- (S) Suspended
- (I) Ineligible
- (W) Walk-on
- Injured
- Current redshirt

== Schedule and results ==
Date time, TV	Rank^{#}	Opponent^{#}	Result	Record	Site (attendance) city, state
Exhibition
10/30/2013*; 8:00 pm, x-JTV		Pittsburg State	W 85–54	-	Allen Fieldhouse (1,386); Lawrence, KS
11/03/2013*; 2:00 pm, JTV		Emporia State	W 61–53	-	Allen Fieldhouse (2,120); Lawrence, KS
Non-Conference Games
11/10/2013*; 2:00 pm, JTV		Oral Roberts	W 84–62	1–0	Allen Fieldhouse (1,477); Lawrence, KS
11/13/2013*; 7:00 pm, JTV		SIU Edwardsville	W 72–56	2–0	Allen Fieldhouse (1,381); Lawrence, KS
11/17/2013*; 4:00 pm, JTV		Creighton	W 74–66	3–0	Allen Fieldhouse (1,668); Lawrence, KS
11/20/2013*; 7:00 pm		at Minnesota	L 59–70	3–1	Williams Arena (3,455); Monneapolis, MN
11/28/2013*; 2:30 pm		vs. Central Michigan; Paradise Jam tournament	W 68–63	4–1	Sports and Fitness Center (486); St. Thomas, VI
11/29/2013*; 2:30 pm		vs. Xavier; Paradise Jam Tournament	L 59–64	4–2	Sports and Fitness Center (302); St. Thomas, VI
11/30/2013*; 2:30 pm		vs. No. 2 Duke; Paradise Jam Tournament	L 40–73	4–3	Sports and Fitness Center (N/A); St. Thomas, VI
12/04/2013*; 7:00 pm, JTV		Arkansas	L 53–64	4–4	Allen Fieldhouse (1,338); Lawrence, KS
12/12/2013*; 7:00 pm, JTV		Texas Southern	W 105–78	5–4	Allen Fieldhouse (1,725); Lawrence, KS
12/15/2013*; 2:00 pm, JTV		Purdue	L 68–71	5–5	Allen Fieldhouse (1,495); Lawrence, KS
12/22/2013*; 7:00 pm, JTV		Tulsa	W 82–78	6–5	Allen Fieldhouse (1,145); Lawrence, KS
12/29/2013*; 2:00 pm, JTV		Yale	W 79–63	7–5	Allen Fieldhouse (2,187); Lawrence, KS
01/02/2014; 7:00 pm, JTV		West Virginia	L 55–65	7–6 (0–1)	Allen Fieldhouse (1,333); Lawrence, KS
01/05/2014; 3:00 pm, FSN		at No. 7 Baylor	L 55–75	7–7 (0–2)	Ferrell Center (6,381); Waco, TX
01/08/2014; 7:00 pm		TCU	L 50–52	7–8 (0–3)	Daniel-Meyer Coliseum (1,887); Ft. Worth, TX
01/11/2014; 7:00 pm, JTV		at Texas Tech	W 67–46	8–8 (1–3)	Allen Fieldhouse (2,063); Lawrence, KS
01/15/2014; 7:00 pm, LHN		at Texas	L 58–70	8–9 (1–4)	Frank Erwin Center (2,625); Austin, TX
01/19/2014; 2:00 pm, JTV		No. 7 Baylor	W 76–60	9–9 (2–4)	Allen Fieldhouse (3,514); Lawrence, KS
01/22/2014; 7:00 pm, JTV		No. 8 Oklahoma State	L 55–64	9–10 (2–5)	Allen Fieldhouse (1,784); Lawrence, KS
01/25/2014; 1:00 pm, FSN		at Kansas State; Sunflower Showdown	W 71–64	10–10 (3–5)	Bramlage Coliseum (6,337); Manhattan, KS
01/28/2014; 7:00 pm, JTV		Texas	L 55–80	10–11 (3–6)	Allen Fieldhouse (1,797); Lawrence, KS
02/01/2014; 4:00 pm		at Texas Tech	W 70–62	11–11 (4–6)	United Spirit Arena (3,833); Lubbock, TX
02/05/2014; 7:00 pm, FSSW+		at No. 12 Oklahoma State	L 74–76	11–12 (4–7)	Gallagher-Iba Arena (2,344); Stillwater, OK
02/09/2014; 2:00 pm, JTV		Oklahoma	L 71–81	11–13 (4–8)	Allen Fieldhouse (5,418); Manhattan, KS
02/12/2014; 7:00 pm, JTV		TCU	W 62–53	12–13 (5–8)	Allen Fieldhouse (1,504); Manhattan, KS
02/15/2014; 6:00 pm, MC22		Iowa State	L 69–72	12–14 (5–9)	Hilton Coliseum (11,988); Ames, IA
02/22/2014; 7:00 pm, SSTV		at Oklahoma	L 61–64	12–15 (5–10)	Lloyd Noble Center (7,554); Norman, OK
02/26/2014; 7:00 pm, JTV		Kansas State; Sunflower Showdown	L 68–76	12–16 (5–11)	Allen Fieldhouse (3,588); Manhattan, KS
03/01/2014; 7:00 pm, FSN		Iowa State	L 79–87	12–17 (5–12)	Allen Fieldhouse (2,334); Manhattan, KS
03/04/2014; 7:00 pm		at No. 7 West Virginia	L 60–67	12–18 (5–13)	WVU Coliseum (5,052); Morgantown, WV
Big 12 tournament
03/07/2014; 6:00 pm, FCS		vs. Kansas State; First Round	W 87–84 ^{OT}	13–18	Chesapeake Energy Arena (N/A); Oklahoma City, OK
03/08/2014; 1:30 pm, FSN		vs. No. 9 Baylor; Quarterfinals	L 47–81	13–19	Chesapeake Energy Arena (4,882); Oklahoma City, OK
*Non-conference game. ^{#}Rankings from AP Poll / Coaches' Poll. (#) Tournament seedings in parentheses. All times are in Central Time.

x- All JTV games will air on Metro Sports, ESPN3 and local affiliates.

== See also ==
- 2013–14 Kansas Jayhawks men's basketball team
