= 2013–14 Texas Longhorns women's basketball team =

Intercollegiate basketball season

2013–14 Texas Longhorns women's basketball

NCAA tournament, second round
- Conference: Big 12 Conference
- Record: 22–12 (11–7 Big 12)
- Head coach: Karen Aston (2nd season)
- Assistant coaches: Travis Mays; Jalie Mitchell; George Washington
- Home arena: Frank Erwin Center

2013–14 Big 12 Conference women's basketball standings
	Conf.				Overall
Team	W		L	PCT	W		L	PCT
No. 5 Baylor †	16	–	2	.889	32	–	5	.865
No. 7 West Virginia	16	–	2	.889	30	–	5	.857
Texas	11	–	7	.611	22	–	12	.647
No. 21 Oklahoma State	11	–	7	.611	25	–	9	.735
Iowa State	9	–	9	.500	20	–	11	.645
Oklahoma	9	–	9	.500	18	–	15	.545
TCU	8	–	10	.444	18	–	15	.545
Kansas	5	–	13	.278	13	–	19	.406
Kansas State	5	–	13	.278	11	–	19	.367
Texas Tech	0	–	18	.000	6	–	24	.200
† 2014 Big 12 Tournament winner Rankings from AP poll

The 2013–14 Texas Longhorns women's basketball team represented the University of Texas at Austin in the 2013–14 college basketball season. It was head coach Karen Aston's second season at Texas. The Longhorns were members of the Big 12 Conference and played their home games at the Frank Erwin Center. They finished the season with a record of 22–12 overall, 11–7 in Big 12 play for a tie for a third-place finish. They lost in the semifinals of the 2014 Big 12 Conference women's basketball tournament to West Virginia. They were invited to the 2014 NCAA Division I women's basketball tournament, where they defeated Penn in the first round before getting defeated by Maryland in the second round.

== Rankings ==
Regular season polls
Poll	Pre- Season	Week 1	Week 2	Week 3	Week 4	Week 5	Week 6	Week 7	Week 8	Week 9	Week 10	Week 11	Week 12	Week 13	Week 14	Week 15	Week 16	Week 17	Week 18	Final
AP	RV	RV																		
Coaches	NR	NR																		

Legend
	Increase in ranking
	Decrease in ranking
	No change
(RV)	Received votes
(NR)	Not ranked

== Before the season ==
=== Departures ===
Name	Number	Pos.	Height	Year	Hometown	Notes
Kayla Brewer	0	F	6'1"	Senior	Jacksonville, Florida	Graduated
Chelsea Bass	11	G	5'10"	Junior	Houston, TX	Retired from basketball due to injuries
Nadia Taylor	42	G	5'8"	Senior	Humble, Texas	Graduated
Cokie Reed	45	P	6'4"	Senior	Waco, Texas	Retired from basketball due to injuries; Graduated

=== Recruiting ===
Name	Pos.	Height	Year	Hometown	Notes
Krystle Henderson	G	5'5"	Junior	Dallas, TX	Transfer from Trinity Valley Community College
Nekia Jones	F	5'11"	Freshman	Beaumont, TX	High School Graduate
Kelsey Lang	C	6'5"	Freshman	The Woodlands, Texas	High School Graduate
Brianna Taylor	G	5'9"	Freshman	Houston, TX	High School Graduate
Lilley Vander Zee	C	6'4"	Freshman	Granbury, TX	High School Graduate

== 2013–14 media ==
=== Television and radio information ===
Most University of Texas home games will be shown on the Longhorn Network, and select games will be available through FSN affiliates. Women's basketball games will also be carried on the radio via KVET.

== Roster ==
2013–14 Texas Longhorns women's basketball team
Players
Coaches

Pos.	#	Name	Height	Year	Previous school	Hometown
G	1	Empress Davenport	5 ft 7 in (1.7 m)	So	Duncanville	Duncanville, TX
G	2	Celina Rodrigo	5 ft 8 in (1.73 m)	RS So	Hillgrove	Marietta, GA
F	3	Nneka Enemkpali	6 ft 1 in (1.85 m)	Jr	Pflugerville	Pflugerville, TX
G	4	Krystle Henderson	5 ft 4 in (1.63 m)	Jr	Dallas Skyline	Dallas, TX
G	5	Ashley Roberts	5 ft 8 in (1.73 m)	RS Sr	Duncanville	Duncanville, TX
G	20	Brianna Taylor	5 ft 9 in (1.75 m)	Fr	Spring Dekaney	Houston, TX
F	21	Nekia Jones	5 ft 11 in (1.8 m)	Fr	Ozen	Beaumont, TX
F	23	GiGi Mazionyte	6 ft 2 in (1.88 m)	Sr	Palangos Sport School	Palanga, Lithuania
G	24	Chassidy Fussell	5 ft 10 in (1.78 m)	Sr	Obion County	Troy, TN
G	32	Brady Sanders	5 ft 11 in (1.8 m)	So	Godley	Joshua, TX
C	34	Imani Boyette	6 ft 7 in (2.01 m)	So	Windward	Los Angeles, CA
C	40	Kelsey Lang	6 ft 5 in (1.96 m)	Fr	The Woodlands	the Woodlands, TX
C	41	Lilley Vander Zee	6 ft 4 in (1.93 m)	Fr	Granbury	Granbury, TX
F	44	Anne Marie Hartung	6 ft 3 in (1.91 m)	Sr	Bowling Green	Bowling Green, MO

Head coach

- Karen Aston (Little Rock)

Assistant coach(es)

- Travis Mays (Texas)
- Jalie Mitchell (North Texas)
- George Washington (Abilene Christian)

Legend

- (C) Team captain
- (S) Suspended
- (I) Ineligible
- (W) Walk-on
- Injured
- Current redshirt

== Schedule ==
Date time, TV	Rank^{#}	Opponent^{#}	Result	Record	Site (attendance) city, state
Exhibition
10/31/2013*; 7:00 pm, LHN		Midwestern State	W 119–75	–	Frank Erwin Center (N/A); Austin, TX
Non-conference regular season
11/10/2013*; 2:00 pm, LHN		UTSA	W 63–42	1–0	Frank Erwin Center (2,534); Austin, TX
11/13/2013*; 7:00 pm, LHN		Texas State	W 96–42	2–0	Frank Erwin Center (2,627); Austin, TX
11/19/2013*; 8:00 pm		at New Mexico	W 67–52	3–0	The Pit (6,083); Albuquerque, NM
11/23/2013*; 12:30 pm, FSN		No. 6 Stanford	L 54–63	3–1	Frank Erwin Center (3,909); Austin, TX
11/28/2013*; 7:15 pm		vs. Syracuse; Paradise Jam tournament	L 65–77	3–2	Sports and Fitness Center (N/A); Saint Thomas, USVI
11/29/2013*; 5:00 pm		vs. No. 12 Texas A&M; Paradise Jam Tournament	W 69–58	4–2	Sports and Fitness Center (N/A); Saint Thomas, USVI
11/30/2013*; 5:00 pm		vs. Memphis; Paradise Jam Tournament	W 65–36	5–2	Sports and Fitness Center (N/A); Saint Thomas, USVI
12/04/2013*; 7:00 pm, LHN		Arkansas–Little Rock	W 60–26	6–2	Frank Erwin Center (2,969); Austin, TX
12/08/2013*; 12:00 pm, FSSO		at No. 3 Tennessee	L 61–75	6–3	Thompson-Boling Arena (11,659); Knoxville, TN
12/15/2013*; 2:00 pm, LHN		Sam Houston State	W 109–48	7–3	Frank Erwin Center (2,838); Austin, TX
12/20/2013*; 7:00 pm, LHN		Northwestern State	W 90–60	8–3	Frank Erwin Center (2,584); Austin, TX
12/28/2013*; 2:00 pm, LHN		Idaho	W 87–58	9–3	Frank Erwin Center (3,119); Austin, TX
Big 12 Regular Season
01/02/2014; 7:00 pm		at No. 11 Oklahoma State	L 61–67	9–4 (0–1)	Gallagher-Iba Arena (3,244); Stillwater, OK
01/05/2014; 2:00 pm, LHN		Kansas State	W 67–53	10–4 (1–1)	Frank Erwin Center (2,994); Austin, TX
01/08/2014; 11:00 am, LHN		Oklahoma	W 79–74 ^{OT}	11–4 (2–1)	Frank Erwin Center (6,111); Austin, TX
01/12/2014; 11:00 am, FSN		at West Virginia	L 49–56 ^{OT}	11–5 (2–2)	WVU Coliseum (3,597); Morgantown, WV
01/15/2014; 7:00 pm, LHN		Kansas	W 70–58	12–5 (3–2)	Frank Erwin Center (2,625); Austin, TX
01/19/2014; 2:00 pm, FSSW		at TCU	L 48–54	12–6 (3–3)	Daniel-Meyer Coliseum (2,672); Fort Worth, TX
01/25/2014; 3:00 pm, LHN		No. 18 West Virginia	W 66–63	13–6 (4–3)	Frank Erwin Center (3,812); Austin, TX
01/28/2014; 7:00 pm, ESPN3		at Kansas	W 80–55	14–6 (5–3)	Allen Fieldhouse (1,797); Lawrence, KS
02/01/2014; 6:30 pm, FSSW		at No. 9 Baylor	L 73–87	14–7 (5–4)	Ferrell Center (7,793); Waco, TX
02/05/2014; 7:00 pm, LHN		Texas Tech	W 88–51	15–7 (6–4)	Frank Erwin Center (3,311); Austin, TX
02/09/2014; 2:00 pm, FS1		Iowa State	W 71–64	16–7 (7–4)	Frank Erwin Center (3,443); Austin, TX
02/12/2014; 7:00 pm, FSMW		at Kansas State	W 69–63	17–7 (8–4)	Bramlage Coliseum (4,098); Manhattan, KS
02/16/2014; 12:00 pm, FS1		No. 4 Baylor	L 56–72	17–8 (8–5)	Frank Erwin Center (5,804); Austin, TX
02/19/2014; 6:30 pm, FSN		at Oklahoma	L 63–64	17–9 (8–6)	Lloyd Noble Center (6,224); Norman, OK
02/22/2014; 7:00 pm		at Iowa State	L 64–81	17–10 (8–7)	Hilton Coliseum (13,187); Ames, IA
02/25/2014; 7:30 pm, LHN		TCU	W 62–50	18–10 (9–7)	Frank Erwin Center (2,691); Austin, TX
03/01/2014; 2:00 pm		at Texas Tech	W 67–64	19–10 (10–7)	United Spirit Arena (4,021); Lubbock, TX
03/04/2014; 7:00 pm, LHN		No. 18 Oklahoma State	W 65–58	20–10 (11–7)	Frank Erwin Center (2,748); Austin, TX
2014 Big 12 women's basketball tournament
03/08/2014; 8:30 pm, FSN		vs. Oklahoma; Quarterfinals	W 82–72	21–10	Chesapeake Energy Arena (5,262); Oklahoma City, OK
03/09/2014; 4:30 pm, FS1		vs. No. 7 West Virginia; Semifinals	L 60–67	21–11	Chesapeake Energy Arena (4,954); Oklahoma City, OK
NCAA women's tournament
03/23/2014*; 2:00 pm, ESPN		vs. Penn; First Round	W 79–61	22–11	Comcast Center (5,733); College Park, MD
03/25/2014*; 6:00 pm, ESPN2		at No. 11 Maryland; Second Round	L 64–69	22–12	Comcast Center (4,042); College Park, MD
*Non-conference game. ^{#}Rankings from AP Poll. (#) Tournament seedings in parentheses. All times are in Central Time.

== See also ==
- Texas Longhorns women's basketball
