= Nina Davis =

Nina Davis may refer to:

- Nina Salaman (1877–1925), née Davis, British Jewish poet, translator, and social activist
- Nina Davis (basketball) (born 1994), American basketball player
