= 2013–14 Oklahoma Sooners women's basketball team =

Intercollegiate basketball season

2013–14 Oklahoma Sooners women's basketball

NCAA Women's Tournament, first round
- Conference: Big 12
- Record: 18–15 (9–9 Big 12)
- Head coach: Sherri Coale (18th season)
- Assistant coaches: Jan Ross (18th season); Pam DeCosta (5th season); Chad Thrailkill (12th season)
- Home arena: Lloyd Noble Center

2013–14 Big 12 Conference women's basketball standings
	Conf.				Overall
Team	W		L	PCT	W		L	PCT
No. 5 Baylor †	16	–	2	.889	32	–	5	.865
No. 7 West Virginia	16	–	2	.889	30	–	5	.857
Texas	11	–	7	.611	22	–	12	.647
No. 21 Oklahoma State	11	–	7	.611	25	–	9	.735
Iowa State	9	–	9	.500	20	–	11	.645
Oklahoma	9	–	9	.500	18	–	15	.545
TCU	8	–	10	.444	18	–	15	.545
Kansas	5	–	13	.278	13	–	19	.406
Kansas State	5	–	13	.278	11	–	19	.367
Texas Tech	0	–	18	.000	6	–	24	.200
† 2014 Big 12 Tournament winner Rankings from AP poll

The 2013–14 Oklahoma Sooners women's basketball team represented the University of Oklahoma in the 2013–14 NCAA Division I women's basketball season. The Sooners were led by Sherri Coale in her eighteenth season. The team played its home games at the Lloyd Noble Center in Norman, Oklahoma as a member of the Big 12 Conference. They finished the season with a record 18–15 overall, 9–9 in Big 12 for a tie to finish in fifth place. They lost in the quarterfinals of the 2014 Big 12 women's basketball tournament to Texas. They were invited to the 2014 NCAA Division I women's basketball tournament, where they lost in the first round to DePaul.

== Roster ==
2013–14 Oklahoma Sooners women's basketball team
Players
Coaches

Pos.	#	Name	Height	Year	Previous school	Hometown
G	24	Campbell, Sharane	5 ft 10 in (1.78 m)	Jr	Star Spencer	Spencer, Okla.
G	25	Carter, Gioya	5 ft 9 in (1.75 m)	Fr	Carl Albert	Midwest City, Okla.
F	31	Durrett, Portia	6 ft 1 in (1.85 m)	Sr	Walters State	Louisville, Ky.
G	2	Edwards, T'ona	5 ft 5 in (1.65 m)	Fr	Northeast Academy	Spencer, Okla.
G	3	Ellenberg, Aaryn	5 ft 7 in (1.7 m)	Sr	Bishop Gorman	Las Vegas, Nev.
F	43	Gibbs, Felisha	6 ft 2 in (1.88 m)	Fr	Earle	Earle, Ark.
C	4	Griffin, Nicole	6 ft 6 in (1.98 m)	Sr	Vincent	Milwaukee, Wis.
G	10	Hook, Morgan	5 ft 10 in (1.78 m)	Sr	Rogers	Lowell, Ark.
F	22	Kellogg, Shaya	6 ft 2 in (1.88 m)	Fr	Ames	Ames, Iowa
G	1	Kornet, Nicole	6 ft 1 in (1.85 m)	So	Liberty Christian	Lantana, Texas
G	20	Little, Peyton	5 ft 11 in (1.8 m)	RS Fr	Wylie	Abilene, Texas
G	23	Manning, Maddie	6 ft 2 in (1.88 m)	RS Fr	Ankeny	Ankeny, Iowa
F	42	Williams, Kaylon	6 ft 3 in (1.91 m)	RS So	Midwest City	Midwest City, Okla.
G	11	Wyatt, Derica	5 ft 10 in (1.78 m)	Fr	Franklin Road Academy	Brentwood, Tenn.

Head coach

Sherri Coale

Assistant coach(es)

Jan Ross
Pam DeCosta
Chad Thrailkill

Legend

- (C) Team captain
- (S) Suspended
- (I) Ineligible
- (W) Walk-on
- Injured
- Current redshirt

Roster
Last update: 2013-08-16

== Schedule ==
Date time, TV	Rank^{#}	Opponent^{#}	Result	Record	Site (attendance) city, state
Exhibition
11/02/2013*; 7:00 pm, FSSW+/FCSC	No. 11	Cameron	W 102–48	–	Lloyd Noble Center (4,784); Norman, OK
11/05/2013*; 7:00 pm, FSSW+/FCSC	No. 11	Central Oklahoma	W 96–37	–	Lloyd Noble Center (4,685); Norman, OK
Non-conference Regular Season
11/08/2013*; 7:00 pm	No. 11	Stetson; Preseason WNIT First round	W 78–60	1–0	Lloyd Noble Center (4,716); Norman, OK
11/10/2013*; 2:00 pm, FSOK/FCSC	No. 11	Wichita State; Preseason WNIT Second round	W 89–70	2–0	Lloyd Noble Center (4,698); Norman, OK
11/14/2013*; 7:00 pm, FSSW+/FCSC	No. 11	No. 25 Gonzaga; Preseason WNIT semifinals	W 82–78	3–0	Lloyd Noble Center (4,736); Norman, OK
11/17/2013*; 3:00 pm, CBSSN	No. 11	No. 5 Louisville; Preseason WNIT championship game	L 92–97 ^{OT}	3–1	Lloyd Noble Center (7,358); Norman, OK
11/20/2013*; 7:00 pm, FSOK/FCSA	No. 11	UT Arlington	W 99–46	4–1	Lloyd Noble Center (4,581); Norman, OK
11/24/2013*; 3:00 pm, P12N	No. 10	at UCLA	L 76–82	4–2	Pauley Pavilion (1,503); Los Angeles, CA
12/01/2013*; 12:00 pm, FS2	No. 18	Creighton	W 80–52	5–2	Lloyd Noble Center (5,066); Norman, OK
12/04/2013*; 6:30 pm, FSOK/FCSP	No. 17	Western Illinois	W 97–80	6–2	Lloyd Noble Center (4,432); Norman, OK
12/08/2013*; 3:00 pm, FS1	No. 17	No. 2 Duke	L 85–94	6–3	Lloyd Noble Center (6,878); Norman, OK
12/15/2013*; 2:00 pm, FSOK/FCSA	No. 20	Maryland Eastern Shore	W 105–46	7–3	Lloyd Noble Center (4,686); Norman, OK
12/18/2013*; 6:00 pm	No. 20	at Fairfield	W 79–51	8–3	Webster Bank Arena (795); Fairfield, CT
12/21/2013*; 6:00 pm	No. 20	at Marist	L 69–76	8–4	McCann Field House (1,904); Poughkeepsie, NY
12/29/2013*; 2:00 pm, FSOK/FCSC	No. 25	Samford	W 66–35	9–4	Lloyd Noble Center (5,755); Norman, OK
Big 12 Regular Season
01/02/2014; 6:30 pm		at Texas Tech	W 68–38	10–4 (1–0)	United Spirit Arena (4,413); Lubbock, TX
01/05/2014; 1:00 pm, FSOK/FCSC	No. 25	No. 14 Iowa State	L 75–82 ^{OT}	10–5 (1–1)	Lloyd Noble Center (6,207); Norman, OK
01/08/2014; 11:00 am, LHN		at Texas	L 74–79 ^{OT}	10–6 (1–2)	Frank Erwin Center (6,111); Austin, TX
01/11/2014; 6:00 pm, FSSW+/FCSC		at Kansas State	W 61–50	11–6 (2–2)	Lloyd Noble Center (5,700); Norman, OK
01/18/2014; 1:00 pm		at West Virginia	L 63–77	11–7 (2–3)	WVU Coliseum (3,841); Morgantown, WV
01/21/2014; 6:00 pm, FS1		at No. 20 Iowa State	W 75–54	12–7 (3–3)	Hilton Coliseum (10,121); Ames, IA
01/25/2014; 7:00 pm, FCSP		TCU	W 63–52	13–7 (4–3)	Lloyd Noble Center (5,301); Norman, OK
01/29/2014; 7:00 pm, FSKC/FCSP		at Kansas State	L 78–86	13–8 (4–4)	Bramlage Coliseum (4,306); Manhattan, KS
02/01/2014; 2:00 pm, FSN		No. 11 Oklahoma State	W 81–74	14–8 (5–4)	Lloyd Noble Center (7,394); Norman, OK
02/03/2014; 6:00 pm, ESPN2		No. 7 Baylor	L 67–81	14–9 (5–5)	Lloyd Noble Center (5,221); Norman, OK
02/09/2014; 2:00 pm, ESPN3		at Kansas	W 81–71	15–9 (6–5)	Allen Fieldhouse (5,418); Lawrence, KS
02/13/2014; 6:00 pm, FS1		No. 13 West Virginia	L 75–76	15–10 (6–6)	Lloyd Noble Center (4,803); Norman, OK
02/16/2014; 12:00 pm, ESPN2		at No. 12 Oklahoma State	L 57–73	15–11 (6–7)	Gallagher-Iba Arena (4,622); Stillwater, OK
02/19/2014; 6:30 pm, FSN		Texas	W 64–63	16–11 (7–7)	Lloyd Noble Center (6,224); Norman, OK
02/22/2014; 7:00 pm, SSTV		Kansas	W 64–61	17–11 (8–7)	Lloyd Noble Center (7,554); Norman, OK
02/24/2014; 6:00 pm, FS1		at No. 6 Baylor	L 89–96	17–12 (8–8)	Ferrell Center (6,808); Waco, TX
03/01/2014; 7:00 pm, FSSW+		at TCU	L 66–76	17–13 (8–9)	Daniel-Meyer Coliseum (2,406); Fort Worth, TX
03/03/2014; 7:00 pm, SSTV		Texas Tech	W 87–32	18–13 (9–9)	Lloyd Noble Center (4,578); Norman, OK
Big 12 tournament
03/08/2014; 8:30 pm, FSN		vs. Texas; Quarterfinals	L 72–82	18–14	Chesapeake Energy Arena (5,262); Oklahoma City, OK
NCAA tournament
03/22/2014*; 12:30 pm, ESPN2		vs. No. 23 DePaul; First Round	L 100–104	18–15	Cameron Indoor Stadium (3,013); Durham, NC
*Non-conference game. ^{#}Rankings from AP Poll. (#) Tournament seedings in parentheses. All times are in Central Time.

x- Sooner Sports Television (SSTV) is aired locally on Fox Sports. However the contract allows games to air on various affiliates. Those affiliates are FSSW, FSSW+, FSOK, FSOK+, and FCS Atlantic, Central, and Pacific.

== See also ==
2013–14 Oklahoma Sooners men's basketball team
