= 2013–14 West Virginia Mountaineers women's basketball team =

American college basketball season

2013–14 West Virginia Mountaineers women's basketball

Rainbow Wahine Classic Champions Big 12 Regular Season Co-Champions

NCAA Women's Basketball, second round
- Conference: Big 12 Conference

Ranking
- Coaches: No. 7
- AP: No. 7
- Record: 30–5 (16–2 Big 12)
- Head coach: Mike Carey (13th season)
- Assistant coaches: Lester Rowe (3rd season); Ken Griffin (1st season); Sharrona Reaves (1st season)
- Home arena: WVU Coliseum

2013–14 Big 12 Conference women's basketball standings
	Conf.				Overall
Team	W		L	PCT	W		L	PCT
No. 5 Baylor †	16	–	2	.889	32	–	5	.865
No. 7 West Virginia	16	–	2	.889	30	–	5	.857
Texas	11	–	7	.611	22	–	12	.647
No. 21 Oklahoma State	11	–	7	.611	25	–	9	.735
Iowa State	9	–	9	.500	20	–	11	.645
Oklahoma	9	–	9	.500	18	–	15	.545
TCU	8	–	10	.444	18	–	15	.545
Kansas	5	–	13	.278	13	–	19	.406
Kansas State	5	–	13	.278	11	–	19	.367
Texas Tech	0	–	18	.000	6	–	24	.200
† 2014 Big 12 Tournament winner Rankings from AP poll

The 2013–14 West Virginia Mountaineers women's basketball team represented West Virginia University during the 2013–14 NCAA Division I women's basketball season. The Mountaineers were coached by thirteenth year head coach Mike Carey and played their home games at WVU Coliseum. They finished with a record of 30–5 overall, 16–2 in Big 12 play to share the Big 12 regular season champions with Baylor. They lost in the 2014 Big 12 Conference women's basketball tournament to Baylor. They were invited to the 2014 NCAA Division I women's basketball tournament, where they defeated Albany in the first round before losing to LSU in the second round.

== Roster ==
2013–14 West Virginia Mountaineers women's basketball team
Players
Coaches

Pos.	#	Name	Height	Year	Previous school	Hometown
C	20	Asya Bussie	6 ft 4 in (1.93 m)	Sr	Seton Keough	Randallstown, Md.
G	1	Christal Caldwell	5 ft 9 in (1.75 m)	Sr	Florida	Charlotte, N.C.
G	12	Darius Faulk	5 ft 9 in (1.75 m)	So	Nazareth Regional	New York, N.Y.
F	5	Averee Fields	6 ft 1 in (1.85 m)	Jr	Calloway County	Murray, Ky.
G	4	Brooke Hampton	5 ft 9 in (1.75 m)	Sr	Colts Neck	Colts Neck, N.J.
F	14	Jess Harlee	6 ft 1 in (1.85 m)	Sr	Fallston	Bel Air, Md.
G	23	Bria Holmes	6 ft 1 in (1.85 m)	So	James Hillhouse	New Haven, Conn.
F	32	Crystal Leary	6 ft 2 in (1.88 m)	Jr	Lake Taylor	Norfolk, Va.
C	15	Lanay Montgomery	6 ft 5 in (1.96 m)	RS Fr	Academy of the Holy Cross	Pittsburgh, Pa.
G	2	Taylor Palmer	5 ft 9 in (1.75 m)	Sr	Mount Vernon	Mount Vernon, N.Y.
G	22	Linda Stepney	5 ft 7 in (1.7 m)	Jr	Lake Taylor	Norfolk, Va.

Head coach

Mike Carey

Assistant coach(es)

Lester Rowe
Ken Griffin
Sharrona Reaves

Legend

- (C) Team captain
- (S) Suspended
- (I) Ineligible
- (W) Walk-on
- Injured
- Current redshirt

Roster
Last update: 2013-08-12

== Schedule and results ==
Date time, TV	Rank^{#}	Opponent^{#}	Result	Record	Site (attendance) city, state
Exhibition
11/01/2013*; 4:00 pm		Concord	W 101–26	–	WVU Coliseum (3,176); Morgantown, WV
Non-Conference Games
11/08/2013*; 5:30 pm, WV Media		Ohio State	L 61–70	0–1	WVU Coliseum (3,513); Morgantown, WV
11/15/2013*; 9:30 pm		vs. Ole Miss; Rainbow Wahine Classic	W 86–56	1–1	Stan Sheriff Center (N/A); Honolulu, HI
11/16/2013*; 5:00 pm		vs. Washington State; Rainbow Wahine Classic	W 88–66	2–1	Stan Sheriff Center (N/A); Honolulu, HI
11/17/2013*; 10:00 pm, OC Sports		at Hawaiʻi; Rainbow Wahine Classic	W 59–56	3–1	Stan Sheriff Center (1,723); Honolulu, HI
11/24/2013*; 4:00 pm		Virginia	W 68–58	4–1	WVU Coliseum (2,014); Morgantown, WV
11/30/2013*; 4:35 pm		at Youngstown State	W 85–58	5–1	Beeghly Center (871); Youngstown, OH
12/03/2013*; 7:00 pm		Coppin State	W 88–56	6–1	WVU Coliseum (831); Morgantown, WV
12/07/2013*; 2:00 pm		Fairleigh Dickinson	W 94–47	7–1	WVU Coliseum (1,553); Morgantown, WV
12/14/2013*; 1:00 pm, WV Media		vs. Marshall; Chesapeake Energy Capital Classic	W 82–51	8–1	Charleston Civic Center (1,565); Charleston, WV
12/18/2013*; 7:00 pm		Delaware State	W 109–47	9–1	WVU Coliseum (1,181); Morgantown, WV
12/21/2013*; 2:00 pm		at Duquesne	W 88–80	10–1	A. J. Palumbo Center (521); Pittsburgh, PA
12/29/2013*; 7:00 pm		Elon	W 89–56	11–1	WVU Coliseum (1,924); Morgantown, WV
Conference Games
01/02/2014; 8:00 pm, ESPN3		at Kansas	W 65–55	12–1 (1–0)	Allen Fieldhouse (1,333); Lawrence, KS
01/04/2014; 7:00 pm, FS1		at No. 11 Oklahoma State	W 71–67	13–1 (2–0)	Gallagher-Iba Arena (3,036); Stillwater, OK
01/08/2014; 7:00 pm		No. 7 Baylor	L 62–78	13–2 (2–1)	WVU Coliseum (2,791); Morgantown, WV
01/12/2014; 12:00 pm, FSN		Texas	W 56–49	14–2 (3–1)	WVU Coliseum (3,597); Morgantown, WV
01/15/2014; 8:00 pm		at No. 20 Iowa State	W 73–59	15–2 (4–1)	Hilton Coliseum (9,824); Ames, IA
01/18/2014; 2:00 pm		Oklahoma	W 77–63	16–2 (5–1)	WVU Coliseum (3,841); Morgantown, WV
01/22/2014; 7:30 pm	No. 18	at Texas Tech	W 70–51	17–2 (6–1)	United Spirit Arena (3,757); Lubbock, TX
01/25/2014; 4:00 pm, LHN	No. 18	at Texas	L 63–66	17–3 (6–2)	Frank Erwin Center (3,812); Austin, TX
01/29/2014; 7:00 pm	No. 20	No. 23 Iowa State	W 67–56	18–3 (7–2)	WVU Coliseum (1,229); Morgantown, WV
02/01/2014; 8:00 pm	No. 20	at TCU	W 66–62	19–3 (8–2)	Daniel–Meyer Coliseum (2,029); Fort Worth, TX
02/08/2014; 2:00 pm	No. 17	Kansas State	W 84–44	20–3 (9–2)	WVU Coliseum (4,803); Morgantown, WV
02/13/2014; 7:00 pm, FS1	No. 13	at Oklahoma	W 76–75	21–3 (10–2)	Lloyd Noble Center (4,803); Norman, OK
02/16/2014; 1:00 pm	No. 13	TCU	W 61–57	22–3 (11–2)	WVU Coliseum (6,161); Morgantown, WV
02/19/2014; 7:00 pm	No. 13	No. 12 Oklahoma State	W 77–45	23–3 (12–2)	WVU Coliseum (2,087); Morgantown, WV
02/22/2014; 6:00 pm, FCS Pacific	No. 13	at Kansas State	W 61–40	24–3 (13–2)	Bramlage Coliseum (4,452); Manhattan, KS
02/26/2014; 7:00 pm	No. 11	Texas Tech	W 69–37	25–3 (14–2)	WVU Coliseum (1,820); Morgantown, WV
03/02/2014; 2:00 pm, FS1	No. 11	at No. 6 Baylor	W 71–69	26–3 (15–2)	Ferrell Center (8,242); Waco, TX
03/04/2014; 7:00 pm	No. 7	Kansas	W 67–60	27–3 (16–2)	WVU Coliseum (5,052); Morgantown, WV
2014 Big 12 Conference women's basketball tournament
03/08/2014; 7:00 pm, FSN	No. 7	vs. TCU; Quarterfinals	W 67–59	28–3	Chesapeake Energy Arena (N/A); Oklahoma City, OK
03/09/2014; 5:30 pm, FS1	No. 7	vs. Texas; Semifinals	W 67–60	29–3	Chesapeake Energy Arena (4,954); Oklahoma City, OK
03/10/2014; 9:00 pm, FS1	No. 5	vs. No. 7 Baylor; Championship	L 71–74	29–4	Chesapeake Energy Arena (4,710); Oklahoma City, OK
2014 NCAA women's tournament
03/23/2014*; 3:30 pm, ESPN	No. 7	vs. Albany; First Round	W 76–61	30–4	Maravich Center (2,833); Baton Rouge, LA
03/25/2014*; 9:45 pm, ESPN2	No. 7	at LSU; Second Round	L 67–76	30–5	Maravich Center (2,186); Baton Rouge, LA
*Non-conference game. ^{#}Rankings from AP Poll. (#) Tournament seedings in parentheses. All times are in Eastern Time.

== See also ==
- 2013–14 West Virginia Mountaineers men's basketball team
