= 2013–14 Iowa State Cyclones women's basketball team =

Intercollegiate basketball season

2013–14 Iowa State Cyclones women's basketball

NCAA Tournament West Region 7 Seed, first round
- Conference: Big 12 Conference

Ranking
- Coaches: No. 23
- Record: 20–11 (9–9 Big 12)
- Head coach: Bill Fennelly (19th season)
- Assistant coaches: Jodi Steyer; Billy Fennelly; Latoja Schaben
- Home arena: Hilton Coliseum

2013–14 Big 12 Conference women's basketball standings
	Conf.				Overall
Team	W		L	PCT	W		L	PCT
No. 5 Baylor †	16	–	2	.889	32	–	5	.865
No. 7 West Virginia	16	–	2	.889	30	–	5	.857
Texas	11	–	7	.611	22	–	12	.647
No. 21 Oklahoma State	11	–	7	.611	25	–	9	.735
Iowa State	9	–	9	.500	20	–	11	.645
Oklahoma	9	–	9	.500	18	–	15	.545
TCU	8	–	10	.444	18	–	15	.545
Kansas	5	–	13	.278	13	–	19	.406
Kansas State	5	–	13	.278	11	–	19	.367
Texas Tech	0	–	18	.000	6	–	24	.200
† 2014 Big 12 Tournament winner Rankings from AP poll

The 2013–14 Iowa State Cyclones women's basketball team represented Iowa State University in the 2013–14 NCAA Division I women's basketball season. This was head coach Bill Fennelly's 19th season at Iowa State. The Cyclones were members of the Big 12 Conference and played their home games at the Hilton Coliseum. The Cyclones earned their 14th NCAA tournament appearance. They finished the season with a record of 20–11 overall, 9–9 in Big 12 play for a tie to finish in fifth place. They lost in the quarterfinals of the 2014 Big 12 Conference women's basketball tournament to Oklahoma State. They were invited to the 2014 NCAA Division I women's basketball tournament, where they lost to Florida State in the first round.

== Radio ==
All Cyclones games were carried on the Iowa State Cyclone Radio Network. Not all affiliates carried women's basketball, and some affiliates only carried select games.

== Roster ==
2013–14 Iowa State Cyclones women's basketball team
Players
Coaches

Pos.	#	Name	Height	Year	Previous school	Hometown
G	2	Lexi Albrecht	5 ft 10 in (1.78 m)	Fr	Carroll Kuemper	Carroll, IA
G	4	Nikki Moody	5 ft 8 in (1.73 m)	Jr	Euless Trinity	Euless, TX
F	5	Hallie Christofferson	6 ft 3 in (1.91 m)	Sr	Exira	Hamlin, IA
G	11	Jadda Buckley	5 ft 8 in (1.73 m)	RS Fr	Mason City	Mason City, IA
G	12	Seanna Johnson	5 ft 10 in (1.78 m)	Fr	DeLaSalle	Brooklyn Park, MN
G	15	Nicole "Kidd" Blaskowsky	5 ft 7 in (1.7 m)	So	Austin	Sugar Land, TX
G/F	22	Brynn Williamson	5 ft 11 in (1.8 m)	Jr	Staley	Kansas City, MO
G	23	Ashley Hagedorn	5 ft 9 in (1.75 m)	Sr	DMACC; I-K-M Manning	Irwin, IA
G	24	Elly Arganbright	5 ft 6 in (1.68 m)	Sr	Panorama	Panora, IA
G/F	32	Fallon Ellis	5 ft 11 in (1.8 m)	Jr	Westbury Christian	Missouri City, TX
F/C	34	Madison Baier	6 ft 4 in (1.93 m)	So	South Tama	Tama, IA
F	35	Jordan Jensen	6 ft 2 in (1.88 m)	Fr	Mountain View	Gilbert, AZ

Head coach

- Bill Fennelly (William Penn)

Assistant coach(es)

- Jodi Steyer (Colorado State)
- Billy Fennelly (Iowa State)
- Latoja Schaben (Toledo)

Legend

- (C) Team captain
- (S) Suspended
- (I) Ineligible
- (W) Walk-on
- Injured
- Current redshirt

Roster

== Schedule ==
Date time, TV	Rank^{#}	Opponent^{#}	Result	Record	Site (attendance) city, state
Exhibition
11/03/2013*; 12:00 pm, Cyclones.tv		Wayne State	W 76–52	–	Hilton Coliseum (10,036); Ames, IA
11/06/2013*; 7:00 pm, Cyclones.tv		Carthage	W 78–49	–	Hilton Coliseum (9,586); Ames, IA
Regular Season
11/10/2013*; 5:00 pm, Cyclones.tv	No. 23	North Dakota	W 84–55	1–0	Hilton Coliseum (10,072); Ames, IA
11/13/2013*; 7:00 pm, Cyclones.tv	No. 22	South Dakota	W 88–72	2–0	Hilton Coliseum (9,628); Ames, IA
11/21/2013*; 6:00 pm	No. 22	at Cincinnati	W 78–42	3–0	Fifth Third Arena (609); Cincinnati, OH
11/24/2013*; 2:05 pm, MC-22	No. 22	at Drake	W 89–47	4–0	Knapp Center (3,241); Des Moines, IA
11/29/2013*; 9:30 pm	No. 23	vs. Eastern Washington; South Point Shootout	W 88–60	5–0	South Point Arena (N/A); Paradise, NV
11/30/2013*; 9:30 pm	No. 23	vs. Auburn; South Point Shootout	W 68–57	6-0	South Point Arena (413); Paradise, NV
12/04/2013*; 7:00 pm, Cyclones.tv	No. 20	Northern Iowa	W 83–55	7–0	Hilton Coliseum (9,932); Ames, IA
12/08/2013*; 2:00 pm, Cyclones.tv	No. 20	Cal State Fullerton	W 79–52	8–0	Hilton Coliseum (10,996); Ames, IA
12/12/2013*; 7:00 pm, Cyclones.tv	No. 17	No. 21 Iowa; Iowa Corn Cy-Hawk Series	W 83–70	9–0	Hilton Coliseum (11,543); Ames, IA
12/28/2013*; 3:30 pm, Cyclones.tv	No. 14	Holy Cross; Cyclone Challenge	W 72–50	10–0	Hilton Coliseum (7,758); Ames, IA
12/29/2013*; 3:30 pm, Cyclones.tv	No. 14	William & Mary; Cyclone Challenge	W 85–65	11–0	Hilton Coliseum (7,127); Ames, IA
01/02/2014; 7:00 pm	No. 14	at TCU	W 71–49	12–0 (1–0)	Daniel–Meyer Coliseum (2,062); Ft. Worth, TX
01/05/2014; 5:00 pm, FCSC	No. 14	No. 25 Oklahoma	W 82–75 ^{OT}	13–0 (2–0)	Lloyd Noble Center (6,207); Norman, OK
01/08/2014; 7:00 pm, Cyclones.tv	No. 11	Texas Tech	W 74–48	14–0 (3–0)	Hilton Coliseum (7,089); Ames, IA
01/11/2014; 6:00 pm, Cyclones.tv	No. 11	No. 15 Oklahoma State	L 62–69	14–1 (3–1)	Hilton Coliseum (10,505); Ames, IA
01/15/2014; 7:00 pm, Cyclones.tv	No. 13	West Virginia	L 59–73	14–2 (3–2)	Hilton Colisuem (9,824); Ames, IA
01/18/2014; 7:00 pm, FCSP	No. 13	at Kansas State	L 74–80	14–3 (3–3)	Bramlage Coliseum (8,221); Manhattan, KS
01/21/2014; 6:00 pm, FS1	No. 20	Oklahoma	L 54–75	14–4 (3–4)	Hilton Coliseum (10,121); Ames, IA
01/25/2014; 7:00 pm, FSSW+	No. 20	at Texas Tech	W 85–76 ^{OT}	15-4 (4–4)	United Spirit Arena (3,937); Lubbock, TX
01/29/2014; 7:00 pm	No. 23	at No. 20 West Virginia	L 56–67	15–5 (4–5)	WVU Coliseum (1,229); Morgantown, WV
02/01/2014; 8:00 pm, Cyclones.tv	No. 23	Kansas State	W 84–65	16–5 (5–5)	Hilton Coliseum (11,480); Ames, IA
02/05/2014; 7:00 pm, Cyclones.tv		TCU	L 60–61	16–6 (5–6)	Hilton Coliseum (10,028); Ames, IA
02/09/2014; 1:00 pm, FS1		at Texas	L 64–71	16–7 (5–7)	Frank Erwin Center (3,443); Austin, TX
02/15/2014; 6:00 pm, Cyclones.tv		Kansas	W 72–69	17–7 (6–7)	Hilton Coliseum (11,988); Ames, IA
02/19/2014; 7:00 pm, FCS		at No. 6 Baylor	L 51–89	17–8 (6–8)	Ferrell Center (6,758); Waco, TX
02/22/2014; 7:00 pm, Cyclones.tv		Texas	W 81–64	18–8 (7–8)	Hilton Coliseum (13,187); Ames, IA
02/26/2014; 7:00 pm, FSOK+		at No. 15 Oklahoma State	W 86–69	19–8 (8–8)	Gallagher-Iba Arena (2,179); Stillwater, OK
03/01/2014; 7:00 pm, FSN		at Kansas	W 87–79	20–8 (9–8)	Allen Fieldhouse (2,334); Manhattan, KS
03/04/2014; 7:00 pm, Cyclones.tv		Baylor	L 54–70	20–9 (9–9)	Hilton Coliseum (10,539); Ames, IA
Big 12 tournament
03/08/2014; 11:00 am, FSN		vs. No. 18 Oklahoma State; Quarterfinals	L 57-67	20–10	Chesapeake Energy Arena (N/A); Oklahoma City, OK
NCAA tournament
03/22/2014*; 3:00 pm, ESPN2		Florida State; First Round	L 44–55	20–11	Hilton Coliseum (N/A); Ames, IA
*Non-conference game. ^{#}Rankings from AP Poll. (#) Tournament seedings in parentheses. All times are in Central Time. For NCAA tournament, number in parentheses is seed, letter indicates region.

== Rankings ==
Ranking movement Legend: ██ Improvement in ranking. ██ Decrease in ranking. ██NR = Not ranked. RV = Receiving votes.
Poll	Pre- Season	Week 2	Week 3	Week 4	Week 5	Week 6	Week 7	Week 8	Week 9	Week 10	Week 11	Week 12	Week 13	Week 14	Week 15	Week 16	Week 17	Week 18	Week 19	Final
AP	23	22	22	23	20	17	15	14	14	11	13	20	23	RV	NR	NR	NR	NR	NR	NR
Coaches	20	18	16	15	12	11	11	10	10	9	11	17	21	23	RV	23	24	21	23	23
