= 2013–14 Oklahoma State Cowgirls basketball team =

Intercollegiate basketball season

2013–14 Oklahoma State Cowgirls basketball

NCAA Women's Tournament, Sweet Sixteen
- Conference: Big 12 Conference

Ranking
- Coaches: No. 18
- AP: No. 21
- Record: 25–9 (11–7 Big 12)
- Head coach: Jim Littell (3rd season)
- Assistant coaches: Bill Annan (6th season); Shannon Gage (1st season); Richard Henderson (1st season)
- Home arena: Gallagher-Iba Arena

2013–14 Big 12 Conference women's basketball standings
	Conf.				Overall
Team	W		L	PCT	W		L	PCT
No. 5 Baylor †	16	–	2	.889	32	–	5	.865
No. 7 West Virginia	16	–	2	.889	30	–	5	.857
Texas	11	–	7	.611	22	–	12	.647
No. 21 Oklahoma State	11	–	7	.611	25	–	9	.735
Iowa State	9	–	9	.500	20	–	11	.645
Oklahoma	9	–	9	.500	18	–	15	.545
TCU	8	–	10	.444	18	–	15	.545
Kansas	5	–	13	.278	13	–	19	.406
Kansas State	5	–	13	.278	11	–	19	.367
Texas Tech	0	–	18	.000	6	–	24	.200
† 2014 Big 12 Tournament winner Rankings from AP poll

The 2013–14 Oklahoma State Cowgirls basketball team represented Oklahoma State University in the 2013–14 college basketball season. It was head coach Jim Littell's third season at Oklahoma State. The Cowgirls, were members of the Big 12 Conference and played their home games at the Gallagher-Iba Arena. They finished the season with a 25–9 overall, 11–7 in Big 12 play for a tie to finish in third place. They lost in the semifinals in the 2014 Big 12 Conference women's basketball tournament to Baylor. They were invited to the 2014 NCAA Division I women's basketball tournament, where they defeated Florida Gulf Coast in the first round, Purdue in the second round before losing to Notre Dame in the sweet sixteen.

== Roster ==
2013–14 Oklahoma State Cowgirls women's basketball team
Players
Coaches

Pos.	#	Name	Height	Year	Previous school	Hometown
G	0	Roshunda Johnson	5 ft 7 in (1.7 m)	Fr	Parkview	Little Rock, AR
G	1	Brittany Atkins	5 ft 10 in (1.78 m)	RS Fr	Lincoln College Prep	Kansas City, MO
G	3	Tiffany Bias	5 ft 6 in (1.68 m)	Sr	Central	Andover, KS
F	4	Liz Donohoe	6 ft 0 in (1.83 m)	RS Jr	Edmond North	Edmond, OK
G	5	Diana Omozee	5 ft 11 in (1.8 m)	Fr	Pflugerville	Pflugerville, TX
G	11	Lakota Beatty	5 ft 8 in (1.73 m)	Fr	Anadarko	Anadarko, OK
F	12	Brianne Coffman	6 ft 3 in (1.91 m)	Fr	Jarrell	Jarrell, TX
G	14	Austyn Iven	5 ft 5 in (1.65 m)	Fr	Stillwater	Stillwater, OK
G	15	Courtney Chelf	5 ft 8 in (1.73 m)	Fr	Enid	Enid, OK
G	22	Brittney Martin	6 ft 0 in (1.83 m)	So	Syracuse (Utah)	Syracuse, UT
C	25	Marisha Wallace	6 ft 2 in (1.88 m)	Jr	Midwest City	Midwest City, OK
C	31	Kendra Suttles	6 ft 1 in (1.85 m)	Sr	Lawton	Lawton, OK
G	35	Kamri Anderson	5 ft 10 in (1.78 m)	Sr	Booker T. Washington	Tulsa, OK
F	45	Katelyn Loecker	6 ft 0 in (1.83 m)	Fr	McPherson	McPherson, KS
C	55	LaShawn Jones	6 ft 3 in (1.91 m)	Jr	Putnam City	Oklahoma City, OK

Head coach

- Jim Littell (Southwestern (KS))

Assistant coach(es)

- Bill Annan (Kansas State)
- Shannon Gage (Missouri State)
- Richard Henderson (Oklahoma State)

Legend

- (C) Team captain
- (S) Suspended
- (I) Ineligible
- (W) Walk-on
- Injured
- Current redshirt

Roster
Last update: 2013-10-23

== Schedule and results ==
Date time, TV	Rank^{#}	Opponent^{#}	Result	Record	Site (attendance) city, state
Exhibition
10/29/2013*; 7:00 pm	No. 21	East Central	W 87–56	–	Gallagher-Iba Arena (1,657); Stillwater, OK
11/04/2013*; 7:00 pm	No. 21	Northeastern State	W 84–47	–	Gallagher-Iba Arena (2,267); Stillwater, OK
Non-conference regular season
11/08/2013*; 11:00 am	No. 21	Lamar	W 83–56	1–0	Gallagher-Iba Arena (2,923); Stillwater, OK
11/10/2013*; 1:00 pm	No. 21	UT Arlington	W 74–35	2–0	Gallagher-Iba Arena (2,280); Stillwater, OK
11/16/2013*; 12:00 pm	No. 20	Northern Colorado	W 87–51	3–0	Gallagher-Iba Arena (2,260); Stillwater, OK
11/18/2013*; 7:00 pm	No. 20	Idaho State	W 74–45	4–0	Gallagher-Iba Arena (2,147); Stillwater, OK
11/22/2013*; 7:00 pm	No. 20	USC	W 82–51	5–0	Gallagher-Iba Arena (2,414); Stillwater, OK
11/26/2013*; 6:00 pm	No. 19	UMass Lowell	W 103–52	6–0	Gallagher-Iba Arena (2,202); Stillwater, OK
12/01/2013*; 2:00 pm	No. 19	North Texas	W 95–47	7–0	Gallagher-Iba Arena (2,225); Stillwater, OK
12/14/2013*; 3:30 pm	No. 14	vs. South Florida; All-College Basketball Classic	W 75–56	8–0	Chesapeake Energy Arena (7,047); Oklahoma City, OK
12/19/2013*; 1:00 pm	No. 13	vs. Michigan State; Puerto Rico Classic	W 63–57	9–0	Coliseo Guillermo Angulo Carolina (200); San Juan, PR
12/21/2013*; 4:00 pm	No. 13	vs. Georgia Tech; Puerto Rico Classic	W 68–60	10–0	Coliseo Guillermo Angulo Carolina (200); San Juan, PR
12/29/2013*; 2:00 pm	No. 11	Texas-Pan American	W 90–48	11–0	Gallagher-Iba Arena (2,706); Stillwater, OK
Conference Regular Season
01/02/2014; 7:00 pm	No. 11	Texas	W 67–61	12–0 (1–0)	Gallagher-Iba Arena (3,244); Stillwater, OK
01/04/2014; 6:00 pm, FS1	No. 11	West Virginia	L 67–71	12–1 (1–1)	Gallagher-Iba Arena (3,036); Stillwater, OK
01/08/2014; 7:00 pm, FCS	No. 15	at Kansas State	W 58–51	13–1 (2–1)	Bramlage Coliseum (3,793); Manhattan, KS
01/11/2014; 6:00 pm, Cyclones.tv	No. 15	at Iowa State	W 69–62	14–1 (3–1)	Hilton Coliseum (10,505); Ames, IA
01/14/2014; 7:00 pm, FCS	No. 11	at TCU	W 65–53	15–1 (4–1)	Gallagher-Iba Arena (2,352); Stillwater, OK
01/18/2014; 12:00 pm, FSOK	No. 11	Texas Tech	W 82–56	16–1 (5–1)	Gallagher-Iba Arena (2,626); Stillwater, OK
01/22/2014; 7:00 pm, ESPN3	No. 8	at Kansas	W 64–56	17–1 (6–1)	Allen Fieldhouse (1,784); Lawrence, KS
01/26/2014; 3:00 pm, FSSW	No. 8	No. 12 Baylor	L 66–69 ^{OT}	17–2 (6–2)	Gallagher-Iba Arena (4,953); Stillwater, OK
01/29/2014; 7:00 pm	No. 11	at TCU	W 49–48	18–2 (7–2)	Daniel-Meyer Coliseum (2,133); Ft. Worth, TX
02/01/2014; 2:00 pm, FSSW	No. 11	at Oklahoma	L 74–81	18–3 (7–3)	Lloyd Noble Center (8,521); Noble, OK
02/05/2014; 7:00 pm, FSSW+	No. 12	Kansas	W 76–74	19–3 (8–3)	Gallagher-Iba Arena (2,344); Stillwater, OK
02/09/2014; 3:00 pm, ESPN2	No. 12	at No. 7 Baylor	L 64–81	19–4 (8–4)	Ferrell Center (7,113); Waco, TX
02/16/2014; 12:00 pm, ESPN2	No. 12	Oklahoma	W 73–57	20–4 (9–4)	Gallagher-Iba Arena (4,622); Stillwater, OK
02/19/2014; 4:00 pm	No. 12	at No. 13 West Virginia	L 45–77	20–5 (9–5)	WVU Coliseum (2,087); Morgantown, WV
02/23/2014; 7:00 pm, FSOK	No. 12	at Texas Tech	W 63–62	21–5 (10–5)	United Spirit Arena (4,726); Lubbock, TX
02/26/2014; 7:00 pm, FSSW+	No. 15	Iowa State	L 69–86	21–6 (10–6)	Gallagher-Iba Arena (2,179); Stillwater, OK
03/01/2014; 2:00 pm	No. 15	Kansas State	W 67–62	22–6 (11–6)	Gallagher-Iba Arena (3,748); Stillwater, OK
03/03/2014; 7:00 pm, LHN	No. 18	at Texas	L 58–65	22–7 (11–7)	Frank Erwin Center (2,748); Lubbock, TX
Big 12 tournament
03/08/2014; 11:30 am, FSN	No. 18	vs. Iowa State; Quarterfinals	W 67–57	23–7	Chesapeake Energy Arena (N/A); Oklahoma City, OK
03/09/2014; 2:00 pm, FS1	No. 18	vs. No. 9 Baylor; Semifinals	L 61–65	23–8	Chesapeake Energy Arena (N/A); Oklahoma City, OK
NCAA tournament
03/22/2014*; 10:00 am, ESPN2	No. 21	vs. Florida Gulf Coast; First Round	W 61–60 ^{OT}	24–8	Mackey Arena (N/A); West Lafayette, IN
03/24/2014*; 8:00 pm, ESPN2	No. 21	at No. 17 Purdue; Second Round	W 73–66	25–8	Mackey Arena (3,082); West Lafayette, IN
03/29/2014*; 1:30 pm, ESPN	No. 21	at No. 2 Notre Dame; Sweet Sixteen	L 72–89	25–9	Edmund P. Joyce Center (8,774); Sound Bend, IN
*Non-conference game. ^{#}Rankings from AP Poll. (#) Tournament seedings in parentheses. All times are in Central Time.

== See also ==
- 2013–14 Oklahoma State Cowboys basketball team
