= Deb Patterson =

US basketball coach & administrator (b.1957)

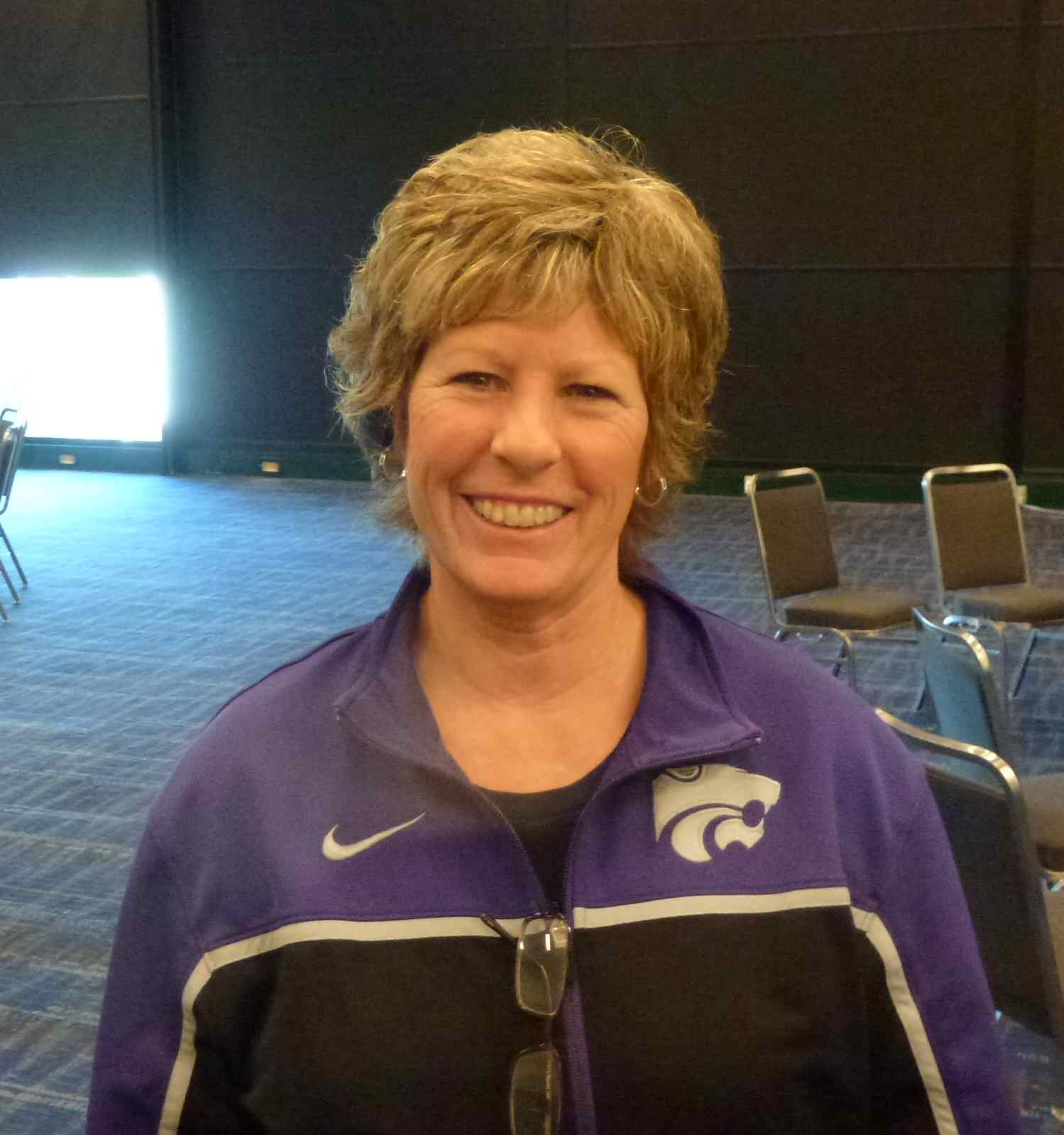

Biographical details
- Born: October 30, 1957 (age 69)

Playing career
- 1975–1979: Rockford

Coaching career (HC unless noted)
- 1982–1986: Hononegah HS
- 1986–1991: Northern Illinois (Asst.)
- 1991–1992: Southern Illinois (Asst.)
- 1992–1996: Vanderbilt (Asst.)
- 1997–1998: USA Basketball (Asst.)
- 1996–2014: Kansas State
- 2014–2019: Northern Colorado (Asst.)
- 2019–present: Washington State (Dir of Player Personnel and Program Analytics.)

Head coaching record
- Overall: 350–226 (.608)

Accomplishments and honors

Championships
- 2× Big 12 regular season championships (2003, 2008)

Awards
- 2× Big 12 Coach of the Year (2002, 2008)
Medal record
Women's basketball
Assistant Coach for United States
FIBA World Championship for Women
Gold medal – first place	1998 Berlin	Team competition
Assistant Coach for United States
World University Games
Gold medal – first place	1997 Marsala	Team competition

Deb Patterson (born August 30, 1957) is currently the director of player personnel and program analytics for the Washington State women's basketball team. Patterson is the former women's basketball program head coach at Kansas State. She was relieved of her coaching duties on March 9, 2014. She is the school's all-time winningest head coach record, with 350 wins.

A native of Rockford, Illinois, Patterson graduated from Rockford West High School then attended Rockford College, where she was a member of the Rockford College Hall of Fame after playing field hockey from 1975 to 1979. Although she never played basketball in college, she later went on to coach basketball.

== Collegiate coaching career ==
Patterson served as an assistant coach at Vanderbilt, and Southern Illinois.

Patterson was hired as the head coach at Kansas State prior to the 1996–97 basketball season. In the 2002 season, her team went 29–5, establishing school records for wins and winning percentage. At one point Kansas State was ranked 2nd in the nation, which was the highest ranking in school history.

The 2004 team went 24–8 including 12–4 in the conference, and finished ranked 16th in the nation in the AP poll. In the 2005 season, Patterson led the Wildcats to a WNIT championship win. The team's 24–10 team marked the fifth consecutive 20 win season under coach Patterson.

In 2008, Patterson led the Wildcats to a Big 12 Conference regular-season championship, after finishing in last place in 2007. Her worst to first accomplishment earned her the Big 12 coach of the year award. The Wildcats went on to lose their first game in the 2008 Big 12 women's basketball tournament against Iowa State, 66–65 in Overtime.

The ten largest crowds in school history for Kansas State women's basketball all occurred during her tenure.

== USA Basketball ==
In 1997, Patterson was named an assistant coach of the USA representative to the World University Games, held in Marsala, Sicily, Italy. The USA team had not won gold in this biennial event since 1991. This year, the USA team would be dominant, with easy victories in all but one contest. After winning their first three contests by no fewer than 38 points, the USA team faced Russia. The game had five ties and 13 lead changes. Connecticut's Nykesha Sales led the scoring of the USA team with 17 points, hitting connective baskets in the second half to give the USA a lead it would not give up. The USA went on to win the game 78–70. The USA went on to win the two medal rounds games, with a 100–82 victory over Cuba to give the USA team the gold medal.

In 1998, Patterson was named an assistant coach of the USA National Team, under head coach Nell Fortner. The USA team competed in the World Championships held in three cities in Germany, including Berlin, Germany. The USA team won all six of the preliminary round games, with most games in double-digit margins. The one exception was the opening round game against Japan, which the USA team won 95–89. In the quarterfinals, the USA team beat Slovakia 89–62. In the semifinal matchup against Brazil, the USA team was behind by ten points in the first half, but came back and won by 14 points. The championship game was a rematch against Russia, a team the USA had defeated by 36 points in the preliminary round. However, the gold medal game would unfold very differently. The USA team was behind most of the game, with a nine-point deficit at halftime. When there were under two minutes to play, the USA was still behind, but Ruthie Bolton hit a three-pointer to give the USA team a one-point lead. After the Russians tied the game, Bolton hit another three to give the USA team a lead they would not relinquish. The USA team won 71–65 to win the gold medal.

== Head coaching record ==
Record table
Season	Team	Overall	Conference	Standing	Postseason
Kansas State Wildcats (Big 12 Conference) (1996–present)
1996–97	Kansas State	19–12	9–7	T-5th	NCAA First Round
1997–98	Kansas State	11–17	4–12	T-9th	
1998–99	Kansas State	16–14	7–9	8th	WNIT Second Round
1999–00	Kansas State	13–17	6–10	8th	
2000–01	Kansas State	12–16	2–14	T-11th	
2001–02	Kansas State	26–8	11–5	T-3rd	NCAA Sweet Sixteen
2002–03	Kansas State	29–5	14–2	2nd	NCAA Second Round
2003–04	Kansas State	25–6	14–2	1st	NCAA Second Round
2004–05	Kansas State	24–8	12–4	3rd	NCAA Second Round
2005–06	Kansas State	24–10	8–8	T-6th	WNIT Champions
2006–07	Kansas State	19–15	4–12	T-11th	WNIT Final Four
2007–08	Kansas State	22–10	13–3	1st	NCAA Second Round
2008–09	Kansas State	25–8	10–6	5th	NCAA Second Round
2009–10	Kansas State	14–18	5–11	T-8th	
2010–11	Kansas State	21–11	10–6	T-3rd	NCAA First Round
2011–12	Kansas State	20–14	9–9	T-4th	NCAA 2nd Round
2012–13	Kansas State	19–18	5–13	8th	WNIT Final Four
2013–14	Kansas State	11–19	5–13	8th	
Kansas State:		350–226 (.608)	148–146 (.509)		
Total:		350–226 (.608)			
National champion Postseason invitational champion Conference regular season champion Conference regular season and conference tournament champion Division regular season champion Division regular season and conference tournament champion Conference tournament champion
