= Nina Davis (basketball) =

American basketball player (born 1994)

Middle Tennessee Blue Raiders
- Position: Forward

Personal information
- Born: December 7, 1994 (age 31) Memphis, Tennessee, U.S.
- Listed height: 5 ft 11 in (1.80 m)

Career information
- High school: Central (Memphis, Tennessee)
- College: Baylor (2013–2017)
- WNBA draft: 2017: undrafted

Career history

Coaching
- 2020–present: Middle Tennessee (assistant)

Career highlights
- Second-team All-American – AP (2016); 2× WBCA Coaches' All-American (2015, 2016); 2× All-American - USBWA (2015, 2016); Big 12 Player of the Year (2015); First-team All-American – AP (2015); 2× Big 12 Tournament Most Outstanding Player (2014, 2015); Big 12 Freshman of the Year (2014); 3× First-team All-Big 12 (2014-2016); Big 12 All-Freshman team (2014)
Medals
Women's basketball
Representing United States
2015 Summer Universiade
Gold medal – first place	2015 Gwangju	Team

Nina Davis (born December 7, 1994) is an American basketball player. Davis represented the United States at the 2015 Summer Universiade. Davis was awarded the Big 12 Conference Women's Basketball Player of the Year as a sophomore at Baylor. Despite scoring over 2,000 points and grabbing over 1,000 rebounds during her career, Davis went undrafted in the 2017 WNBA draft. In February 2019, Central High School retired her jersey number (13).

== Baylor statistics ==
Legend
GP	Games played	GS	Games started	MPG	Minutes per game
FG%	Field goal percentage	3P%	3-point field goal percentage	FT%	Free throw percentage
RPG	Rebounds per game	APG	Assists per game	SPG	Steals per game
BPG	Blocks per game	PPG	Points per game	**Bold**	Career high

Year	Team	GP	Points	FG%	3P%	FT%	RPG	APG	SPG	BPG	PPG
2013–14	Baylor	37	555	**59.5%**	0.0%	68.5%	**8.9**	1.2	**1.5**	0.4	15.0
2014–15	Baylor	37	**779**	58.4%	0.0%	69.6%	8.3	1.6	1.3	**0.7**	**21.1**
2015–16	Baylor	**38**	619	54.8%	**37.5%**	67.7%	6.1	1.6	1.0	0.4	16.3
2016–17	Baylor	37	480	56.3%	0.0%	**70.7%**	5.6	**1.8**	1.1	0.4	13.0
Career		149	2433	57.2%	27.3%	69.1%	7.2	1.6	1.2	0.5	16.3
