= 2013–14 NCAA Division I women's basketball rankings =

- Season: 2013–14
- NCAA Tournament: 2014
- Preseason No. 1: Connecticut
- NCAA Tournament Champions: Connecticut
NCAA Division I women's basketball rankings


Two human polls make up the 2013–14 NCAA Division I women's basketball rankings, the AP Poll and the Coaches Poll, in addition to various publications' preseason polls.

== Legend ==
	Increase in ranking
	Decrease in ranking
	Not ranked previous week
Italics	Number of first place votes
(#-#)	Win–loss record
т	Tied with team above or below also with this symbol

== AP Poll ==
This poll is compiled by sportswriters across the nation. In Division I men's and women's college basketball, the AP Poll is largely just a tool to compare schools throughout the season and spark debate, as it has no bearing on postseason play.

	Preseason Oct. 31	Week 2 Nov. 11	Week 3 Nov. 18	Week 4 Nov. 25	Week 5 Dec. 2	Week 6 Dec. 9	Week 7 Dec. 16	Week 8 Dec. 23	Week 9 Dec. 30	Week 10 Jan. 6	Week 11 Jan. 13	Week 12 Jan. 20	Week 13 Jan. 27	Week 14 Feb. 3	Week 15 Feb. 10	Week 16 Feb. 17	Week 17 Feb. 24	Week 18 Mar. 3	Week 19 Mar. 10	
1.	Connecticut (36)	Connecticut (1-0) (35)	Connecticut (4-0) (36)	Connecticut (8-0) (36)	Connecticut (9-0) (36)	Connecticut (10-0) (36)	Connecticut (10-0) (36)	Connecticut (12-0) (36)	Connecticut (13-0) (36)	Connecticut (15-0) (36)	Connecticut (17-0) (36)	Connecticut (19-0) (36)	Connecticut (21-0) (36)	Connecticut (23-0) (36)	Connecticut (25-0) (36)	Connecticut (26-0) (36)	Connecticut (28-0) (36)	Connecticut (30-0) (36)	Connecticut (33-0) (36)	1.
2.	Duke	Duke (1-0) (1)	Duke (3-0)	Duke (5-0)	Duke (8-0)	Duke (10-0)	Duke (10-0)	Notre Dame (10-0)	Notre Dame (11-0)	Notre Dame (13-0)	Notre Dame (15-0)	Notre Dame (16-0)	Notre Dame (18-0)	Notre Dame (21-0)	Notre Dame (23-0)	Notre Dame (24-0)	Notre Dame (27-0)	Notre Dame (29-0)	Notre Dame (32-0)	2.
3.	Stanford	Stanford (1-0)	Tennessee (4-0)	Tennessee (5-0)	Tennessee (7-0)	Tennessee (8-0)	Tennessee (9-0)	Duke (12-1)	Duke (12-1)	Duke (14-1)	Duke (16-1)	Duke (18-1)	Duke (20-1)	Stanford (21-1)	Duke (22-2)	Louisville (25-2)	Louisville (27-2)	Louisville (28-2)	Louisville (30-3)	3.
4.	Tennessee	Tennessee (1-0)	Louisville (4-0)	Louisville (6-0)	Notre Dame (6-0)	Notre Dame (8-0)	Notre Dame (9-0)	Stanford (10-1)	Stanford (11-1)	Stanford (13-1)	Stanford (15-1)	Stanford (16-1)	Stanford (18-1)	Louisville (22-1)	Louisville (23-2)	South Carolina (23-2)	South Carolina (25-2)	Stanford (28-2)	Tennessee (27-5)	4.
5.	Louisville	Louisville (1-0)	Notre Dame (3-0)	Notre Dame (4-0)	Kentucky (8-0)	Kentucky (9-0)	Kentucky (11-0)	Tennessee (10-1)	Tennessee (11-1)	Louisville (15-1)	Louisville (16-1)	Louisville (18-1)	Louisville (20-1)	Duke (21-2)	South Carolina (22-2)	Stanford (24-2)	Stanford (26-2)	South Carolina (26-3)	West Virginia (29-3)	5.
6.	Notre Dame	Notre Dame (1-0)	Stanford (3-1)	Stanford (4-1)	Stanford (7-1)	Stanford (7-1)	Stanford (8-1)	Kentucky (11-1)	Kentucky (12-1)	Maryland (13-1)	Maryland (14-1)	Maryland (16-1)	North Carolina (17-3)	South Carolina (20-2)	Stanford (22-2)	Baylor (22-3)	Baylor (24-3)	Tennessee (24-5)	Stanford (29-3)	6.
7.	Kentucky	Kentucky (2-0)	Kentucky (4-0)	Kentucky (6-0)	Louisville (7-1)	Louisville (9-1)	Louisville (10-1)	Louisville (12-1)	Louisville (13-1)	Baylor (12-1)	Baylor (14-1)	North Carolina (16-3)	South Carolina (18-2)	Baylor (18-3)	Baylor (20-3)	Duke (22-3)	Duke (24-4)	West Virginia (26-3)	Baylor (28-4)	7.
8.	Maryland	Maryland (2-0)	Maryland (2-1)	Maryland (4-1)	Maryland (7-1)	Maryland (8-1)	Maryland (10-1)	Maryland (10-1)	Maryland (12-1)	Tennessee (12-2)	South Carolina (16-1)	Oklahoma State (16-1)	Maryland (16-2)	Tennessee (18-4)	Tennessee (19-4)	Maryland (20-4)	Penn State (21-5)	Maryland (24-5)	South Carolina (27-4)	8.
9.	Cal	Baylor (1-0)	Baylor (2-0)	Baylor (6-0)	Baylor (6-0)	Baylor (7-1)	Baylor (8-1)	Baylor (9-1)	Baylor (10-1)	Kentucky (13-2)	North Carolina (14-3)	Kentucky (15-3)	Baylor (16-3)	Penn State (17-4)	Maryland (19-4)	Penn State (20-5)	Maryland (22-5)	Baylor (25-4)	Duke (27-6)	9.
10.	Baylor	Cal (1-1)	Oklahoma (3-1)	Nebraska (5-0)	Penn State (5-1)	South Carolina (9-0)	South Carolina (9-0)	North Carolina (11-2)	North Carolina (11-2)	South Carolina (14-1)	Kentucky (14-3)	South Carolina (17-2)	Tennessee (16-4)	Maryland (17-4)	NC State (21-3)	Tennessee (20-5)	Tennessee (22-5)	Duke (25-5)	Kentucky (24-8)	10.
11.	Oklahoma	Oklahoma (2-0)	Nebraska (4-0)	North Carolina (4-1)	Colorado (6-0)	Colorado (8-0)	Colorado (9-0)	Oklahoma State (10-0)	Oklahoma State (11-0)	Iowa State (13=0)	Oklahoma State (14-1)	Tennessee (14-3)	Oklahoma State (17-2)	Arizona State (19-3)	Penn State (18-5)	North Carolina (20-6)	West Virginia (24-3)	Penn State (22-6)	Maryland (24-6)	11.
12.	North Carolina	North Carolina (1-0)	North Carolina (2-1)	Texas A&M (3-0)	South Carolina (7-0)	Penn State (6-2)	LSU (8-1)	Colorado (9-1)	Colorado (10-1)	LSU (12-2)	Tennessee (13-3)	Baylor (14-3)	Penn State (15-4)	Oklahoma State (18-3)	Oklahoma State (19-4)	Oklahoma State (20-4)	Kentucky (20-7)	Kentucky (22-7)	North Carolina (24-9)	12.
13.	Penn State	Penn State (2-0)	Texas A&M (3-0)	Penn State (3-1)	LSU (6-1)	LSU (7-1)	Oklahoma State (8-0)	South Carolina (11-1)	South Carolina (12-1)	North Carolina (12-3)	Iowa State (14-1)	Penn State (13-4)	Kentucky (16-4)	North Carolina (17-5)	West Virginia (20-3)	West Virginia (22-3)	NC State (23-5)	North Carolina (22-8)	Nebraska (25-6)	13.
14.	Dayton	LSU (2-0)	Penn State (2-1)	Colorado (4-0)	Oklahoma State (7-0)	Oklahoma State (7-0)	North Carolina (8-2)	Iowa State (9-0)	Iowa State (11-0)	Penn State (10-3)	LSU (13-3)	Arizona State (15-2)	LSU (16-4)	NC State (19-3)	Texas A&M (18-6)	NC State (22-4)	North Carolina (21-7)	NC State (24-6)	Penn State (22-7)	14.
15.	LSU	Nebraska (1-0)	LSU (2-1)	LSU (4-1)	Nebraska (6-1)	North Carolina (7-2)	Iowa State (9-0)	Penn State (8-3)	Penn State (9-3)	Oklahoma State (12-1)	Cal (12-3)	LSU (14-4)	Arizona State (17-3)	Kentucky (17-5)	Arizona State (20-4)	Kentucky (19-6)	Oklahoma State (21-5)	Texas A&M (23-7)	Texas A&M (24-8)	15.
16.	Texas A&M	Texas A&M (0-0)	Colorado (2-0)	Purdue (4-0)	Purdue (5-1)	Georgia (8-0)	Georgia (10-0)	LSU (9-2)	LSU (9-2)	Nebraska (11-2)	Penn State (11-4)	Vanderbilt (16-3)	Vanderbilt (16-4)	LSU (17-5)	Vanderbilt (17-5)	Texas A&M (20-6)	Nebraska (20-5)	Nebraska (22-6)	NC State (25-7)	16.
17.	Nebraska	Colorado (0-0)	Cal (2-2)	South Carolina (6-0)	Oklahoma (5-2)	Iowa State (8-0)	Penn State (7-3)	Purdue (9-2)	Purdue (10-2)	Colorado (11-2)	Florida State (14-2)	Texas A&M (15-4)	Texas A&M (16-5)	West Virginia (19-3)	North Carolina (17-6)	Nebraska (19-5)	Texas A&M (21-7)	Purdue (21-7)	Purdue (21-8)	17.
18.	Purdue	Purdue (1-0)	Purdue (3-0)	Oklahoma (4-2)	North Carolina (6-2)	Purdue (6-2)	Purdue (7-2)	Nebraska (9-2)	Nebraska (10-2)	Florida State (13-1)	Nebraska (12-3)	West Virginia (16-2)	NC State (18-3)	Vanderbilt (17-5)	Kentucky (17-6)	Cal (18-7)	Cal (20-7)	Oklahoma State (22-6)	Gonzaga (27-4)	18.
19.	Colorado	Michigan State (1-0)	South Carolina (4-0)	Oklahoma State (5-0)	Georgia (8-0)	Nebraska (7-2)	Nebraska (8-2)	Georgia (11-1)	Georgia (12-1)	Cal (10-3)	Arizona State (14-2)	Cal (12-4)	Purdue (14-5)	Texas A&M (17-6)	LSU (18-6)	LSU (18-7)	Purdue (20-7)	Michigan State (21-8)	Iowa (26-8)	19.
20.	Michigan State	Oklahoma State (2-0)	Oklahoma State (3-0)	Cal (3-2)	Iowa State (6-0)	Oklahoma (6-3)	Oklahoma (7-3)	Syracuse (11-1)	Syracuse (11-1)	NC State (14-1)	NC State (15-2)	Iowa State (14-3)	West Virginia (17-3)	Gonzaga (20-3)	Gonzaga (22-3)	Arizona State (20-6)	Arizona State (22-6)	Cal (21-8)	Michigan State (22-9)	20.
21.	Oklahoma State	South Carolina (2-0)	Michigan State (2-1)	Michigan State (4-1)	Cal (5-2)	Iowa (10-1)	Cal (7-2)	Iowa (11-2)	Florida State (12-1)	Purdue (10-3)	Colorado (11-4)	Nebraska (13-4)	Cal (14-5)	Middle Tennessee (18-3)	Nebraska (17-5)	Purdue (18-7)	Michigan State (18-8)	Gonzaga (26-4)	Oklahoma State (23-8)	21.
22.	South Carolina	Iowa State (1-0)	Iowa State (2-0)	Georgia (5-0)	Syracuse (8-0)	Cal (6-2)	Iowa (10-2)	Florida State (11-1)	Iowa (12-2)	Indiana (14-0)	Purdue (11-4)	Purdue (13-5)	Gonzaga (18-3)	Nebraska (15-5)	Cal (16-7)	St. John's (19-5)	Gonzaga (24-4)	Middle Tennessee (25-4)	Middle Tennessee (26-4)	22.
23.	Iowa State	Dayton (1-1)	Georgia (3-0)	Iowa State (4-0)	Texas A&M (4-2)	Gonzaga (7-1)	Syracuse (8-1)	Cal (7-3)	Cal (8-3)	Arizona State (12-2)	Rutgers (13-2)	NC State (16-3)	Florida State (15-5) т	Cal (14-7)	Purdue (17-7)	Michigan State (17-8)	Middle Tennessee (23-4)	Iowa (23-7)	DePaul (25-6)	23.
24.	Georgia	Georgia (1-0)	Gonzaga (2-1)	Gonzaga (3-1)	Gonzaga (4-1)	Texas A&M (6-2)	Florida State (8-1)	Gonzaga (10-2)	Arizona State (10-1)	San Diego (15-0)	Vanderbilt (14-3)	Florida State (14-4)	Iowa State (15-4) т	Michigan State (15-7)	St. John's (18-5)	Gonzaga (23-4)	Rutgers (20-6)	Rutgers (21-7)	Cal (21-9)	24.
25.	Gonzaga	Gonzaga (2-0)	DePaul (2-0)	DePaul (3-0)	Iowa (8-1)	Syracuse (8-1)	Gonzaga (8-2)	Oklahoma (8-4)	Oklahoma (9-4)	Georgia (12-3)	Texas A&M (13-4)	Gonzaga (16-3)	Middle Tennessee (17-3)	Purdue (15-7)	Michigan State (16-8)	Rutgers (20-5)	Iowa (21-7)	DePaul (23-6)	Bowling Green (27-3)	25.
	Preseason Oct. 31	Week 2 Nov. 11	Week 3 Nov. 18	Week 4 Nov. 25	Week 5 Dec. 2	Week 6 Dec. 9	Week 7 Dec. 16	Week 8 Dec. 23	Week 9 Dec. 30	Week 10 Jan. 6	Week 11 Jan. 13	Week 12 Jan. 20	Week 13 Jan. 27	Week 14 Feb. 3	Week 15 Feb. 10	Week 16 Feb. 17	Week 17 Feb. 24	Week 18 Mar. 3	Week 19 Mar. 10	
		None	Dropped: Dayton (2-2)	None	Dropped: Michigan State (5-2); DePaul (3-2)	None	Dropped: Texas A&M (6-3)	None	Dropped: Gonzaga (10-3)	Dropped: Syracuse (11-3); Iowa (12-4); Oklahoma (10-5)	Dropped: Indiana (14-1); San Diego (15-2); Georgia (12-5)	Dropped: Colorado (11-6); Rutgers (13-4)	Dropped: Nebraska (13-5)	Dropped: Florida State (15-6); Iowa State (16-5)	Dropped: Middle Tennessee (19-4)	Dropped: Vanderbilt (17-8)	Dropped: LSU (18-9); St. John's (19-7)	Dropped: Arizona State (22-8)	Dropped: Rutgers (22-9)	

== USA Today Coaches Poll ==
The Coaches Poll is the second oldest poll still in use after the AP Poll. It is compiled by a rotating group of 32 college Division I head coaches. The Poll operates by Borda count. Each voting member ranks teams from 1 to 25. Each team then receives points for their ranking in reverse order: Number 1 earns 25 points, number 2 earns 24 points, and so forth. The points are then combined and the team with the highest points is then ranked #1; second highest is ranked #2 and so forth. Only the top 25 teams with points are ranked, with teams receiving first place votes noted the quantity next to their name. The maximum points a single team can earn is 800.

	Preseason Oct. 31	Week 2 Nov. 12	Week 3 Nov. 19	Week 4 Nov. 26	Week 5 Nov. 3	Week 6 Dec. 10	Week 7 Dec. 17	Week 8 Dec. 24	Week 9 Dec. 31	Week 10 Jan. 7	Week 11 Jan. 14	Week 12 Jan. 21	Week 13 Jan. 28	Week 14 Feb. 4	Week 15 Feb. 11	Week 16 Feb. 18	Week 17 Feb. 25	Week 18 Mar. 4	Week 19 Mar. 11	Final Apr. 9	
1.	Connecticut (32)	Connecticut (2-0) (32)	Connecticut (4-0) (32)	Connecticut (8-0) (32)	Connecticut (9-0) (32)	Connecticut (10-0) (32)	Connecticut (10-0) (32)	Connecticut (12-0) (32)	Connecticut (13-0) (32)	Connecticut (15-0) (32)	Connecticut (18-0) (32)	Connecticut (19-0) (32)	Connecticut (21-0) (32)	Connecticut (23-0) (32)	Connecticut (25-0) (32)	Connecticut (26-0) (31)	Connecticut (28-0) (31)	Connecticut (31-0) (31)	Connecticut (34-0) (31)	Connecticut (40-0) (32)	1.
2.	Duke	Duke (1-0)	Duke (3-0)	Duke (5-0)	Duke (8-0)	Duke (10-0)	Duke (10-0)	Notre Dame (10-0)	Notre Dame (11-0)	Notre Dame (13-0)	Notre Dame (15-0)	Notre Dame (17-0)	Notre Dame (19-0)	Notre Dame (21-0)	Notre Dame (23-0)	Notre Dame (25-0) (1)	Notre Dame (27-0) (1)	Notre Dame (29-0) (1)	Notre Dame (32-0) (1)	Notre Dame 37-1	2.
3.	Stanford	Tennessee (2-0)	Louisville (4-0)	Louisville (6-0)	Tennessee (7-0)	Tennessee (8-0)	Tennessee (9-0)	Duke (12-1)	Duke (12-1)	Duke (14-1)	Duke (16-1)	Duke (18-1)	Duke (20-1)	Stanford (21-1)	Louisville (23-2)	Louisville (25-2)	Louisville (27-2)	Stanford (28-2)	Tennessee (27-5)	Stanford (33-4)	3.
4.	Tennessee	Louisville (2-0)	Tennessee (4-0)	Tennessee (5-0)	Stanford (7-1)	Notre Dame (8-0) т	Notre Dame (9-0)	Stanford (10-1)	Stanford (11-1)	Stanford (13-1)	Stanford (15-1)	Stanford (17-1)	Stanford (19-1)	Louisville (22-1)	Baylor (20-3)	Stanford (24-2)	Stanford (26-2)	Louisville (28-3)	Louisville (30-4)	Maryland (28-7)	4.
5.	Louisville	Stanford (1-1)	Stanford (3-1)	Stanford (4-1)	Notre Dame (6-0)	Stanford (7-1) т	Stanford (9-1)	Tennessee (10-1)	Tennessee (11-1)	Louisville (15-1)	Louisville (16-1)	Louisville (18-1)	Louisville (20-1)	Duke (21-2)	Stanford (22-2)	Baylor (22-3)	Baylor (25-3) т	Maryland (24-5)	Stanford (29-3)	Louisville (33-5)	5.
6.	Maryland	Notre Dame (2-0)	Notre Dame (3-0)	Notre Dame (4-0)	Kentucky (8-0)	Kentucky (9-0)	Kentucky (11-0)	Kentucky (11-1)	Kentucky (12-1)	Maryland (13-1)	Maryland (14-1)	Maryland (16-1)	North Carolina (17-3)	Baylor (19-3)	South Carolina (22-2)	South Carolina (23-2)	South Carolina (25-2) т	Tennessee (24-5)	Baylor (29-4)	Baylor (32-5)	6.
7.	Notre Dame	Maryland (2-0)	Kentucky (4-0)	Kentucky (6-0)	Louisville (7-1)	Louisville (9-1)	Louisville (10-1)	Louisville (12-1)	Louisville (13-1)	Baylor (12-1)	Baylor (14-2)	North Carolina (16-3)	Baylor (16-3)	South Carolina (20-2)	Duke (22-3)	Duke (23-3)	Maryland (22-5)	South Carolina (26-3)	West Virginia (29-4)	North Carolina (27-10)	7.
8.	Kentucky	Kentucky (2-0)	Maryland (2-1)	Maryland (5-1)	Maryland (7-1)	Maryland (9-1)	Maryland (10-1)	Maryland (10-1)	Maryland (12-1)	Tennessee (12-2)	South Carolina (16-1)	Kentucky (15-3)	South Carolina (18-2)	Tennessee (18-4)	Tennessee (20-4)	North Carolina (20-6)	Duke (24-4)	West Virginia (26-3)	South Carolina (27-4)	Tennessee (29-6)	8.
9.	Cal	Baylor (1-0)	Baylor (3-0)	Baylor (6-0)	Baylor (6-0)	Baylor (7-1)	Baylor (8-1)	Baylor (9-1)	Baylor (10-1)	Iowa State (13-0)	North Carolina (14-3)	Oklahoma State (16-1)	Maryland (16-3)	Maryland (17-4)	Maryland (19-4)	Maryland (20-5)	Tennessee (22-5)	Baylor (25-4)	Maryland (24-6)	South Carolina (29-5)	9.
10.	Baylor	Nebraska (2-0)	Nebraska (3-0)	Nebraska (5-0)	South Carolina (8-0)	South Carolina (9-0)	South Carolina (9-0)	Iowa State (9-0)	Iowa State (11-0)	Kentucky (13-2)	Tennessee (13-3)	Baylor (14-3)	Tennessee (16-4)	Penn State (17-4)	North Carolina (18-6)	Tennessee (20-5)	West Virginia (24-3)	Duke (22-5)	Duke (27-6)	Texas A&M (27-9)	10.
11.	North Carolina	Cal (1-1)	Texas A&M (3-0)	Texas A&M (3-0)	Penn State (5-1)	Iowa State (8-0)	Iowa State (9-0)	North Carolina (11-2)	North Carolina (11-2)	South Carolina (14-1)	Iowa State (14-1)	South Carolina (17-2)	Oklahoma State (17-2)	North Carolina (17-5)	Penn State (18-5)	Penn State (20-5)	North Carolina (21-7)	Penn State (22-6)	Kentucky (24-8)	Kentucky (26-9)	11.
12.	Nebraska	Texas A&M (1-0)	North Carolina (2-1)	North Carolina (4-1)	Iowa State (6-0)	Penn State (6-2)	LSU (8-1)	South Carolina (11-1)	South Carolina (12-1)	North Carolina (12-3)	Kentucky (14-3)	Tennessee (14-4)	Kentucky (16-4)	Oklahoma State (18-3)	Oklahoma State (19-4)	Oklahoma State (20-4)	Penn State (21-6)	North Carolina (22-8)	Nebraska (25-6)	West Virginia (30-5)	12.
13.	Texas A&M	Oklahoma (2-0)	Oklahoma (3-1)	South Carolina (7-0)	Nebraska (6-1)	LSU (7-1)	North Carolina (9-2)	Oklahoma State (10-0)	Oklahoma State (11-0)	LSU (12-2)	Oklahoma State (14-1)	Penn State (13-4)	Penn State (15-4)	Kentucky (17-5)	NC State (21-3)	Texas A&M (20-6)	Nebraska (21-5)	Kentucky (22-7)	North Carolina (24-9)	Duke (28-7)	13.
14.	Oklahoma	North Carolina (1-1)	South Carolina (4-0)	Penn State (3-1)	LSU (6-1)	North Carolina (7-2)	Colorado (9-0)	Colorado (9-1)	Colorado (10-1)	Nebraska (11-2)	LSU (13-3)	LSU (14-4)	LSU (16-4)	LSU (17-5)	Texas A&M (18-6)	West Virginia (22-3)	Oklahoma State (21-5)	Texas A&M (23-7)	Texas A&M (24-8)	Penn State (24-8)	14.
15.	Penn State	Penn State (2-0)	Penn State (2-1)	Iowa State (4-0)	Oklahoma (5-2)	Colorado (8-0)	Georgia (10-0)	Nebraska (9-2)	Nebraska (10-2)	Penn State (10-3)	Cal (12-3)	Texas A&M (15-4)	Texas A&M (16-5)	Gonzaga (20-3)	Gonzaga (22-3)	Kentucky (19-6)	Kentucky (20-7)	Nebraska (22-6)	Penn State (22-7)	Oklahoma State (25-9)	15.
16.	Dayton	LSU (2-0)	Iowa State (4-0)	Oklahoma (4-2)	North Carolina (6-2)	Nebraska (7-2)	Oklahoma State (8-0)	LSU (9-2)	LSU (10-2)	Oklahoma State (12-1)	Nebraska (12-3)	Cal (13-4)	Purdue (15-5)	Arizona State (19-3)	West Virginia (20-3)	NC State (22-4)	Texas A&M (21-7)	Purdue (21-7)	Gonzaga (28-4)	DePaul (29-7)	16.
17.	LSU	South Carolina (2-0)	Cal (2-2)	LSU (4-1)	Colorado (6-0)	Georgia (8-0)	Nebraska (8-2)	Penn State (8-3)	Penn State (9-3)	Florida State (13-1)	Penn State (11-4)	Iowa State (14-3)	Gonzaga (18-3)	NC State (19-3)	LSU (18-6)	Nebraska (19-5)	NC State (23-5)	NC State (24-6)	NC State (25-7)	Nebraska (26-7)	17.
18.	Michigan State	Iowa State (1-0)	LSU (2-1)	Michigan State (4-1)	Georgia (8-0)	Oklahoma State (7-0)	Penn State (7-3)	Georgia (11-1)	Georgia (12-1)	Colorado (11-2)	Florida State (14-2)	Nebraska (13-4)	Vanderbilt (16-4)	Texas A&M (17-6)	Kentucky (17-6)	LSU (18-7)	Cal (20-7)	Oklahoma State (22-7)	Oklahoma State (23-8)	BYU (28-7)	18.
19.	Colorado	Colorado (0-0)	Michigan State (2-1)	Colorado (4-0)	Oklahoma State (7-0)	Oklahoma (6-3)	Oklahoma (7-3)	Purdue (9-2)	Purdue (10-2)	Cal (10-3)	Purdue (11-4)	Vanderbilt (16-3)	Cal (14-5)	Vanderbilt (17-5)	Nebraska (17-5)	Cal (18-7)	Purdue (20-7)	Gonzaga (26-4)	Purdue (21-8)	Purdue (22-9)	19.
20.	Iowa State	Michigan State (0-1)	Colorado (2-0)	Cal (3-2)	Texas A&M (4-2)	Texas A&M (6-2)	Cal (7-2)	Florida State (11-1)	Florida State (12-1)	Purdue (10-3)	Colorado (11-4)	Purdue (13-5)	Arizona State (17-3)	West Virginia (19-3)	Vanderbilt (17-6)	Gonzaga (23-4)	Gonzaga (24-4)	Cal (21-8)	Middle Tennessee (26-4)	California (22-10)	20.
21.	South Carolina	Dayton (1-1)	Georgia (3-0)	Georgia (5-0)	Cal (5-2)	Cal (6-2)	Purdue (7-2)	Gonzaga (10-2)	Cal (8-3)	Georgia (12-3)	NC State (15-2) т	West Virginia (16-2)	Iowa State (15-4)	Nebraska (15-5)	Arizona State (20-4)	Purdue (18-7)	Dayton (20-5)	Iowa State (20-8)	Cal (21-9)	NC State (25-8)	21.
22.	Georgia	Georgia (1-0)	Purdue (3-0)	Purdue (4-0)	Purdue (5-1)	Gonzaga (7-1)	Gonzaga (9-2)	Cal (7-3)	Oklahoma (9-4)	Oklahoma (10-5)	Texas A&M (13-4) т	Gonzaga (16-3)	NC State (18-3)	Cal (14-7)	Cal (16-7)	Dayton (18-5)	Arizona State (22-6)	Middle Tennessee (25-4)	DePaul (26-6)	Gonzaga (29-5)	22.
23.	Purdue	Purdue (1-0)	Oklahoma State (4-0)	Oklahoma State (5-0)	Syracuse (8-0)	Purdue (6-2)	Florida State (9-10)	Syracuse (11-1)	Iowa (12-2)	NC State (14-1)	Gonzaga (14-3)	Arizona State (15-3)	Nebraska (13-5)	Iowa State (16-5)	Purdue (17-7)	Iowa State (17-7)	LSU (18-9)	Michigan State (21-8)	Iowa State (20-10)	Michigan State (23-10)	23.
24.	Oklahoma State	Oklahoma State (2-0)	Dayton (2-2)	Gonzaga (3-1)	Gonzaga (5-1)	Iowa (10-1)	Texas A&M (6-3)	Oklahoma (8-4)	Syracuse (11-2)	San Diego (15-0)	Arizona State (14-2)	NC State (16-3)	West Virginia (17-3)	Purdue (15-7)	Wichita State (20-2)	Arizona State (20-6)	Iowa State (18-8)	Dayton (21-6)	Michigan State (22-9)	LSU (21-13)	24.
25.	UCLA	Vanderbilt (2-0)	Gonzaga (2-1)	DePaul (3-0)	Michigan State (5-2)	Florida State (8-1)	Iowa (10-2)	Iowa (11-2)	Arizona State (11-1)	Arkansas (14-1)	Vanderbilt (14-3)	Florida State (14-4)	Florida State (15-5)	Middle Tennessee (18-3)	Dayton (15-5)	Vanderbilt (17-8)	Middle Tennessee (23-4)	DePaul (23-6)	Iowa (26-8)	Oregon State (24-11)	25.
	Preseason Oct. 31	Week 2 Nov. 12	Week 3 Nov. 19	Week 4 Nov. 26	Week 5 Nov. 3	Week 6 Dec. 10	Week 7 Dec. 17	Week 8 Dec. 24	Week 9 Dec. 31	Week 10 Jan. 7	Week 11 Jan. 14	Week 12 Jan. 21	Week 13 Jan. 28	Week 14 Feb. 4	Week 15 Feb. 11	Week 16 Feb. 18	Week 17 Feb. 25	Week 18 Mar. 4	Week 19 Mar. 11	Final Apr. 9	
		Dropped: UCLA (1-1)	Dropped: Vanderbilt (3-1)	Dropped: Dayton (2-3)	Dropped: DePaul (3-2)	Dropped: Syracuse (8-1), Michigan State (5-4)	None	Dropped: Texas A&M (7-4)	Dropped: Gonzaga (11-3)	Dropped: Iowa (12-4); Syracuse (11-3); Arizona State (12-2)	Dropped: Georgia (12-5); Oklahoma (11-6); San Diego (15-2); Arkansas (14-3)	Dropped: Colorado (11-6)	None	Dropped: Florida State (15-6)	Dropped: Iowa State (16-7); Middle Tennessee (19-4)	Dropped: Wichita State (21-3)	Dropped: Vanderbilt (18-9)	Dropped: Arizona State (22-8); LSU (18-11)	Dropped: Dayton (23-7)	Dropped: Middle Tennessee (29-5); Iowa State (20-11); Iowa (27-9)	

== See also ==
- 2013–14 NCAA Division I men's basketball rankings
