= Brooks Donald-Williams =

American college basketball coach (born 1978)

Brooks Williams
Biographical details
- Born: January 16, 1978 (age 48); Jennings, Louisiana, U.S.
- Education: Mississippi State University

Coaching career (HC unless noted)
- 2000–2003: Arkansas–Little Rock (Asst.)
- 2003–2004: Memphis (Asst.)
- 2004–2007: Southern Miss (Asst.)
- 2007–2016: McNeese State
- 2016–2019: Alabama (Asst.)
- 2019–2023: Louisiana–Monroe
- 2024–2025: Southern Miss (Asst.)
- 2025–2026: Alabama (AHC/RC.)

Head coaching record
- Overall: 178–224 (.443)

Accomplishments and honors

Championships
- 2010–11 Southland Conference Regular Season Champion; 2011 Southland Conference Tournament Champion; 2012 Southland Conference Tournament Champion

Awards
- 2010 Toys for Tots of Southwest Louisiana Influential Person of the Year; 2011 Southland Conference Coach of the Year; 2013 McNeese State President's Award

Brooks Donald-Williams (born January 16, 1978) is an American basketball coach who was the associate head coach of the Alabama Crimson Tide women's basketball team. She was previously the head coach of the Louisiana–Monroe Warhawks women's basketball team from 2019 to 2023.

== Career ==
She was previously the head coach of the McNeese State Cowgirls basketball team, and an assistant women's basketball coach for Alabama. On April 11, 2019, Donald-Williams was named the head women's basketball coach at the University of Louisiana at Monroe. On March 7, 2023 she stepped down.

Donald-Williams was hired as the associate head coach for the Southern Miss Lady Eagles basketball team on May 14, 2024.

== Head coaching record ==
Record table
Season	Team	Overall	Conference	Standing	Postseason
McNeese State Cowgirls (Southland Conference) (2007–2016)
2007–08	McNeese State	10–21	8–8	T–2nd	
2008–09	McNeese State	14–16	6–10	7th	
2009–10	McNeese State	7–22	3–13	T–10th	
2010–11	McNeese State	26–7	15–1	1st	NCAA First Round
2011–12	McNeese State	26–8	13–3	2nd	NCAA First Round
2012–13	McNeese State	21–15	11–7	T–4th	WBI Runner Up
2013–14	McNeese State	19–14	10–8	7th	WBI First Round
2014–15	McNeese State	18–14	11–7	5th	WBI Second Round
2015–16	McNeese State	20–13	11–7	5th	WBI Second Round
McNeese State:		161–130 (.553)	88–64 (.579)		
Louisiana–Monroe Warhawks (Sun Belt Conference) (2019–2023)
2019–20	Louisiana–Monroe	3–26	1–17		
2020–21	Louisiana–Monroe	3–20	1–15		
2021–22	Louisiana–Monroe	4–25	0–14	12th	
2022–23	Louisiana–Monroe	7–23	3–15	T–13th	
Louisiana–Monroe:		17–94 (.153)	5–61 (.076)		
Total:		178–224 (.443)			
National champion Postseason invitational champion Conference regular season champion Conference regular season and conference tournament champion Division regular season champion Division regular season and conference tournament champion Conference tournament champion
