= 2013–14 Oral Roberts Golden Eagles women's basketball team =

Intercollegiate basketball season

2013–14 Oral Roberts Golden Eagles women's basketball
- Conference: Southland Conference
- Record: 9–20 (8–10 Southland)
- Head coach: Misti Cussen (2nd season)
- Assistant coaches: Bojan Jankovic (4th season); Royce Samuels (2nd season); Kyron Stokes (1st season)
- Home arena: Mabee Center

2013–14 Southland Conference women's basketball standings
	Conf.				Overall
Team	W		L	PCT	W		L	PCT
Lamar	13	–	5	.722	18	–	13	.581
Stephen F. Austin	13	–	5	.722	23	–	13	.639
Central Arkansas	12	–	6	.667	18	–	12	.600
Northwestern State†	11	–	7	.611	21	–	13	.618
Nicholls State	11	–	7	.611	17	–	14	.548
Texas A&M-CC	11	–	7	.611	18	–	12	.600
Abilene Christian*	8	–	6	.571	18	–	12	.600
McNeese State	10	–	8	.556	19	–	14	.576
Oral Roberts	8	–	10	.444	9	–	20	.310
Houston Baptist	8	–	10	.444	12	–	17	.414
Sam Houston State	8	–	10	.444	13	–	16	.448
Southeastern Louisiana	7	–	11	.389	8	–	22	.267
Incarnate Word*	2	–	12	.143	8	–	19	.296
New Orleans**	0	–	18	.000	0	–	29	.000
† 2014 Southland tournament winner As of March 22, 2014 *ineligible for postseason play due to Div. I transition **ineligible for postseason play due to APR penalties Rankings from AP poll

The 2013–14 Oral Roberts Golden Eagles women's basketball team represented Oral Roberts University during the 2013–14 NCAA Division I women's basketball season. The Golden Eagles were led by 2nd year head coach Misti Cussen and played their home games at the Mabee Center. The 2013–14 season was the Golden Eagles' final season in the Southland Conference. Beginning with the 2014–15 season, the Golden Eagles will once again be competing in The Summit League after a two-year period as members of the Southland Conference.

== Roster ==
Number	Name	Position	Height	Year	Hometown
0	Atoe' Jackson	Guard	5–9	Junior	Los Angeles, California
1	Kaylan Mayberry	Guard	5–6	Freshman	Tulsa, Oklahoma
2	Teana Ogden	Guard	5–5	Freshman	Denton, Texas
3	Alexus Wilson	Guard	5–9	Freshman	Muskogee, Oklahoma
4	Dorottya Balla	Forward	6–1	Freshman	Pécs, Hungary
5	April Glisson	Guard	5–9	Freshman	Sapulpa, Oklahoma
11	Jenni Bryan	Guard	5–9	Redshirt Junior	Coweta, Oklahoma
12	Christian Key	Guard	5–10	Senior	Tulsa, Oklahoma
13	Tysia Manuel	Forward	5–10	Junior	Marietta, Oklahoma
14	Carolina Lopez	Center	6–2	Junior	Cali, Colombia
23	Bernadett Balla	Forward	6–2	Junior	Pécs, Hungary
24	Noora Jaervikanges	Guard	6–0	Freshman	Helsinki, Finland
42	Sarah Shelton	Center	6–3	Redshirt Senior	Fort Worth, Texas

== Schedule ==
Date time, TV	Rank^{#}	Opponent^{#}	Result	Record	Site (attendance) city, state
Regular Season
11/08/2013*; 12:00 pm		USAO; TTCU Best Field trip Ever	W 89–68	1–0	Mabee Center (3,673); Tulsa, OK
11/10/2013*; 2:00 pm, ESPN3		at Kansas	L 62–84	1–1	Allen Fieldhouse (1,477); Lawrence, KS
11/13/2013*; 7:00 pm, RazorVision		at Arkansas	L 33–91	1–2	Bud Walton Arena (1,211); Fayeteeville, AR
11/22/2013*; 7:00 pm		Navy	L 64–89	1–3	Mabee Center (1,102); Tulsa, OK
11/26/2013*; 7:00 pm, Hurricane Vision		at Tulsa; PSO Mayors Cup	L 58–72	1–4	Reynolds Center (1,477); Tulsa, OK
11/30/2013*; 3:00 pm		Arkansas–Little Rock	L 51–53	1–5	Mabee Center (769); Tulsa, OK
12/04/2013*; 7:00 pm, Mizzou Network		at Missouri	L 64–86	1–6	Mizzou Arena (802); Columbia, MO
12/16/2013*; 11:00 am		at Northwestern	L 54–84	1–7	Welsh-Ryan Arena (5,271); Evanston, IL
12/18/2013*; 12:00 pm, MU Tube		at Marquette	L 71–79 ^{OT}	1–8	BMO Harris Bradley Center (3,804); Milwaukee, WI
12/29/2013*; 2:00 pm, BTDN		at No. 15 Nebraska	L 53–89	1–9	Pinnacle Bank Arena (5,811); Lincoln, NE
01/02/2014; 5:00 pm		Houston Baptist	W 85–73	2–9 (1–0)	Mabee Center (813); Tulsa, OK
01/04/2014; 3:00 pm		Texas A&M–Corpus Christi	L 53–58	2–10 (1–1)	Mabee Center (1,127); Tulsa, OK
01/11/2014; 3:00 pm		Central Arkansas	W 70–60	3–10 (2–1)	Mabee Center (1,067); Tulsa, OK
01/16/2014; 5:30 pm		at Abilene Christian	L 56–70	3–11 (2–2)	Moody Coliseum (816); Abilene, TX
01/18/2014; 2:00 pm		at Incarnate Word	L 64–67	3–12 (2–3)	McDermott Convocation Center (386); San Antonio, TX
01/23/2014; 5:00 pm, ESPN3		Stephen F. Austin	W 64–55	4–12 (3–3)	Mabee Center (670); Tulsa, OK
01/25/2014; 12:30 pm		Northwestern State	W 62–51	5–12 (4–3)	Mabee Center (664); Tulsa, OK
01/30/2014; 5:30 pm, ESPN3		at Nicholls State	L 60–71	5–13 (4–4)	Stopher Gym (525); Thibodaux, LA
02/01/2014; 1:00 pm		at McNeese State	L 57–73	5–14 (4–5)	Burton Coliseum (1,101); Lake Charles, LA
02/06/2014; 5:00 pm		New Orleans	W 93–62	6–14 (5–5)	Mabee Center (1,094); Tulsa, OK
02/08/2014; 4:00 pm		Southeastern Louisiana	W 81–78	7–14 (6–5)	Mabee Center (1,243); Tulsa, OK
02/13/2014; 5:00 pm		at Houston Baptist	L 75–84	7–15 (6–6)	Sharp Gymnasium (524); Houston, TX
02/15/2014; 1:00 pm		at Texas A&M–Corpus Christi	L 53–61	7–16 (6–7)	American Bank Center (1,255); Corpus Christi, TX
02/22/2014; 2:00 pm		at Central Arkansas	L 54–62	7–17 (6–8)	Farris Center (724); Conway, AR
02/27/2014; 5:00 pm		Lamar	W 84–78	8–17 (7–8)	Mabee Center (718); Tulsa, OK
03/01/2014; 1:00 pm		Sam Houston State	W 80–50	9–17 (8–8)	Mabee Center (502); Tulsa, OK
03/06/2014; 6:00 pm		at Stephen F. Austin	L 52–72	9–18 (8–9)	William R. Johnson Coliseum (2,720); Nacogdoches, TX
03/08/2014; 1:00 pm		at Northwestern State	L 49–71	9–19 (8–10)	Prather Coliseum (1,431); Natchitoches, LA
2014 Southland Conference women's basketball tournament
03/13/2014; 1:00 pm	(8)	vs. (5) Nicholls State; First Round	L 66–77	9–20	Leonard E. Merrill Center (N/A); Katy, TX
*Non-conference game. ^{#}Rankings from AP Poll. (#) Tournament seedings in parentheses. All times are in Central Time.

== See also ==
- 2013–14 Oral Roberts Golden Eagles men's basketball team
