= 2013–14 Central Arkansas Sugar Bears basketball team =

Intercollegiate basketball season

2013–14 Central Arkansas Sugar Bears basketball
- Conference: Southland Conference
- Record: 18–12 (12–6 Southland)
- Head coach: Sandra Rushing (2nd season)
- Assistant coaches: Rusty Laverentz (1st season); Kaci Bailey (1st season); Destinee Rogers (1st season)
- Home arena: Farris Center

2013–14 Southland Conference women's basketball standings
	Conf.				Overall
Team	W		L	PCT	W		L	PCT
Lamar	13	–	5	.722	18	–	13	.581
Stephen F. Austin	13	–	5	.722	23	–	13	.639
Central Arkansas	12	–	6	.667	18	–	12	.600
Northwestern State†	11	–	7	.611	21	–	13	.618
Nicholls State	11	–	7	.611	17	–	14	.548
Texas A&M-CC	11	–	7	.611	18	–	12	.600
Abilene Christian*	8	–	6	.571	18	–	12	.600
McNeese State	10	–	8	.556	19	–	14	.576
Oral Roberts	8	–	10	.444	9	–	20	.310
Houston Baptist	8	–	10	.444	12	–	17	.414
Sam Houston State	8	–	10	.444	13	–	16	.448
Southeastern Louisiana	7	–	11	.389	8	–	22	.267
Incarnate Word*	2	–	12	.143	8	–	19	.296
New Orleans**	0	–	18	.000	0	–	29	.000
† 2014 Southland tournament winner As of March 22, 2014 *ineligible for postseason play due to Div. I transition **ineligible for postseason play due to APR penalties Rankings from AP poll

The 2013–14 Central Arkansas Sugar Bears basketball team represented the University of Central Arkansas during the 2013–14 NCAA Division I women's basketball season. The Bears were led by second-year head coach Sandra Rushing and play their home games at the Farris Center. They were members of the Southland Conference.

== Roster ==
Number	Name	Position	Height	Year	Hometown
0	Kelsey McClure	Guard	5–8	Freshman	Muskogee, Oklahoma
1	Terai Sadler	Forward	5–10	Junior	Waitara, New Zealand
2	Micah Rice	Guard	5–8	Senior	Little Rock, Arkansas
3	Kelsei Ewings	Guard	5–5	Junior	West Point, Mississippi
5	Jameka Watkins	Guard	5–6	Sophomore	England, Arkansas
10	Brianna Mullins	Guard	5–6	Freshman	Rosston, Arkansas
20	Tyisha Amos	Forward	5–10	Junior	Forest, Mississippi
22	Maggie Proffitt	Guard	5–7	Freshman	Columbus, Mississippi
23	Brittany Agee	Forward	5–11	Junior	Bessemer, Alabama
24	Peyton Herrell	Center	6–2	Freshman	Jessieville, Arkansas
25	Raquel Logan	Forward	6–1	Freshman	West Memphis, Arkansas
50	Courtney Duever	Center	6–1	Senior	Austin, Texas

== Schedule ==
Date time, TV	Rank^{#}	Opponent^{#}	Result	Record	Site (attendance) city, state
Regular season
11/08/2013*; 5:30 pm		Alcorn State	W 71–39	1–0	Farris Center (879); Conway, AR
11/10/2013*; 2:00 pm		at Ole Miss	W 66–63	2–0	Tad Smith Coliseum (590); Oxford, MS
11/14/2013*; 5:30 pm		Central Baptist	W 98–36	3–0	Farris Center (845); Conway, AR
11/18/2013*; 7:00 pm		at Indiana	L 53–80	3–1	Assembly Hall (1,711); Bloomington, IN
11/23/2013*; 12:00 pm		Louisiana–Monroe	W 63–56 ^{OT}	4–1	Farris Center (N/A); Conway, AR
11/26/2013*; 6:00 pm		at Jacksonville State	W 58–54	5–1	Pete Mathews Coliseum (426); Jacksonville, AL
11/30/2013*; 7:00 pm, Peay Nation Sports TV Network		Austin Peay	L 60–81	5–2	Dunn Center (475); Clarksville, TN
12/02/2013*; 5:30 pm		Southern Illinois	L 37–39	5–3	Farris Center (238); Conway, AR
12/16/2013*; 5:00 pm		at Southern Miss	L 60–71	5–4	Farris Center (405); Conway, AR
12/21/2013*; 2:00 pm		Arkansas State	L 61–73	5–5	Farris Center (495); Conway, AR
12/30/2013*; 2:00 pm		Philander Smith College	W 85–57	6–5	Farris Center (389); Conway, AR
01/02/2014; 5:30 pm		Texas A&M–Corpus Christi	W 66–62	7–5 (1–0)	Farris Center (622); Conway, AR
01/04/2014; 2:00 pm		Houston Baptist	W 67–54	8–5 (2–0)	Farris Center (550); Conway, AR
01/11/2014; 3:00 pm		at Oral Roberts	L 60–70	8–6 (2–1)	Mabee Center (1,067); Tulsa, OK
01/16/2014; 5:30 pm		at Incarnate Word	W 60–40	9–6 (3–1)	McDermott Convocation Center (752); San Antonio, TX
01/18/2014; 1:00 pm		at Abilene Christian	W 67–54	10–6 (4–1)	Moody Coliseum (318); Abilene, TX
01/23/2014; 5:30 pm		Northwestern State	W 73–61	11–6 (5–1)	Farris Center (1,158); Conway, AR
01/25/2014; 2:00 pm		Stephen F. Austin	W 65–42	12–6 (6–1)	Farris Center (1,215); Conway, AR
01/30/2014; 5:30 pm		at McNeese State	W 65–50	13–6 (7–1)	Burton Coliseum (1,003); Lake Charles, LA
02/01/2014; 1:00 pm		at Nicholls State	L 60–69	13–7 (7–2)	Stopher Gym (343); Thibodaux, LA
02/06/2014; 5:30 pm		Southeastern Louisiana	W 80–70	14–7 (8–2)	Farris Center (1,088); Conway, AR
02/08/2014; 2:00 pm, ESPN3		New Orleans	W 62–30	15–7 (9–2)	Farris Center (881); Conway, AR
02/13/2014; 5:00 pm		at Texas A&M–Corpus Christi	L 42–45	15–8 (9–3)	American Bank Center (1,721); Corpus Christi, TX
02/15/2014; 3:00 pm		at Houston Baptist	W 57–55	16–8 (10–3)	Sharp Gymnasium (526); Houston, TX
02/22/2014; 2:00 pm		Oral Roberts	W 62–54	17–8 (11–3)	Farris Center (724); Conway, AR
02/27/2014; 5:30 pm		Sam Houston State	W 54–49	18–8 (12–3)	Farris Center (2,154); Conway, AR
03/01/2014; 2:00 pm		Lamar	L 53–56	18–9 (12–4)	Farris Center (1,312); Conway, AR
03/06/2014; 5:30 pm		at Northwestern State	L 45–77	18–10 (12–5)	Prather Coliseum (1,431); Natchitoches, LA
03/08/2014; 4:00 pm		at Stephen F. Austin	L 41–61	18–11 (12–6)	William R. Johnson Coliseum (3,661); Nacogdoches, TX
2014 Southland Conference women's basketball tournament
03/14/2014; 1:30 pm	(3)	vs. (7) McNeese State; Quarterfinals	L 62–66	18–12	Leonard E. Merrell Center (709); Katy, TX
*Non-conference game. ^{#}Rankings from AP Poll. (#) Tournament seedings in parentheses. All times are in Central Time.

== See also ==
- 2013–14 Central Arkansas Bears basketball team
