= 2013–14 Houston Baptist Huskies women's basketball team =

Intercollegiate basketball season

2013–14 Houston Baptist Huskies women's basketball
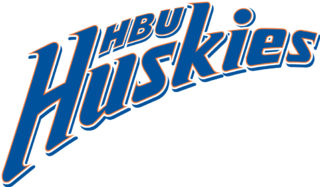
- Conference: Southland Conference
- Record: 12–17 (8–10 Southland)
- Head coach: Donna Finnie (1st season)
- Assistant coaches: Ben Chase (1st season); Lauren Tippert (1st season)
- Home arena: Sharp Gymnasium

2013–14 Southland Conference women's basketball standings
	Conf.				Overall
Team	W		L	PCT	W		L	PCT
Lamar	13	–	5	.722	18	–	13	.581
Stephen F. Austin	13	–	5	.722	23	–	13	.639
Central Arkansas	12	–	6	.667	18	–	12	.600
Northwestern State†	11	–	7	.611	21	–	13	.618
Nicholls State	11	–	7	.611	17	–	14	.548
Texas A&M-CC	11	–	7	.611	18	–	12	.600
Abilene Christian*	8	–	6	.571	18	–	12	.600
McNeese State	10	–	8	.556	19	–	14	.576
Oral Roberts	8	–	10	.444	9	–	20	.310
Houston Baptist	8	–	10	.444	12	–	17	.414
Sam Houston State	8	–	10	.444	13	–	16	.448
Southeastern Louisiana	7	–	11	.389	8	–	22	.267
Incarnate Word*	2	–	12	.143	8	–	19	.296
New Orleans**	0	–	18	.000	0	–	29	.000
† 2014 Southland tournament winner As of March 22, 2014 *ineligible for postseason play due to Div. I transition **ineligible for postseason play due to APR penalties Rankings from AP poll

The 2013–14 Houston Baptist Huskies women's basketball team represented Houston Baptist University in the 2013–14 college basketball season. This was head coach Donna Finnie's first season as head coach at HBU. The Huskies played their home games at the Sharp Gymnasium and are members of the Southland Conference.

== Media ==
All Houston Baptist games was broadcast online live by Legacy Sports Network (LSN) with audio for all road games and video for all home games.

== Roster ==
2013–14 Houston Baptist Huskies women's basketball team
Players
Coaches

Pos.	#	Name	Height	Year	Previous school	Hometown
G	3	Heidi Sihvola	5 ft 8 in (1.73 m)	Fr	Makelanrinne	Helsinki, Finland
F	5	Soraya Page	6 ft 0 in (1.83 m)	Fr	Matthew Flinders	Mountain Creek, Queensland, Australia
G	10	Devyn Weymouth	5 ft 7 in (1.7 m)	Jr	Lincoln	Stockton, CA
G	11	Tayler Jefferson	5 ft 4 in (1.63 m)	Jr	North Shore	Houston, TX
G	12	Wiebke Bruns	5 ft 10 in (1.78 m)	Jr	Gustav-Heinemann Secondary	Muelheim, Germany
G	13	Emely Lopez	5 ft 8 in (1.73 m)	Fr	Westbury	Houston, TX
F	14	Erin McGarrachan	6 ft 0 in (1.83 m)	Jr	St. Maurice's; UTEP	Cumbermauld, Scotland
F	20	Shanice Steenholdt	6 ft 0 in (1.83 m)	Jr	Roswell	Roswell, NM
G	21	Rachel Arthur	5 ft 7 in (1.7 m)	So	Atascocita	Humble, TX
F	23	Anna Strickland	6 ft 1 in (1.85 m)	So	The Woodlands; Harding	The Woodlands, TX
G	24	Meghan Shank	5 ft 8 in (1.73 m)	So	Ventura	Ventura, CA
F	25	Monet Neal	5 ft 10 in (1.78 m)	So	William Howard Taft	San Antonio, TX
G	33	Maisie Elston	5 ft 10 in (1.78 m)	Jr	Barking Abbey	Rochford, England
G	35	Ekemini Essien	5 ft 9 in (1.75 m)	So	Dallas Lutheran	Carrollton, TX
F	42	Ashleigh Nwanguma	6 ft 1 in (1.85 m)	So	Cinco Ranch	Katy, TX

Head coach

- Donna Finnie (Heriot–Watt)

Assistant coach(es)

- Ben Chase (Emerson)
- Lauren Tippet (Sam Houston State)

Legend

- (C) Team captain
- (S) Suspended
- (I) Ineligible
- (W) Walk-on
- Injured
- Current redshirt

== Schedule and results ==
Date time, TV	Opponent	Result	Record	Site (attendance) city, state
Exhibition
11/03/2013*; 2:00 pm, LSN	UT Tyler	W 93–56	-	Sharp Gymnasium (356); Houston, TX
Regular Season
11/08/2013*; 7:00 pm, LSN	UT Arlington	W 72–60	1–0	Sharp Gymnasium (628); Houston, TX
11/14/2013*; 7:00 pm	at Texas Southern	L 70–82	1–1	Health and Physical Education Arena (582); Houston, TX
11/16/2013*; 6:30 pm, LSN	Southern Utah	W 88–77	2–1	Sharp Gymnasium (347); Houston, TX
11/19/2013*; 5:30 pm, BSN	at Sam Houston State	L 68–85	2–2	Bernard Johnson Coliseum (642); Huntsville, TX
11/22/2013*; 6:00 pm	at Jackson State	L 50–74	2–3	Williams Assembly Center (214); Jackson, MS
11/25/2013*; 7:05 pm	at South Alabama	W 54–51	3–3	Mitchell Center (307); Mobile, AL
12/03/2013*; 7:30 pm, LSN	Texas–Pan American	L 74–76	3–4	Sharp Gymnasium (290); Houston, TX
12/15/2013*; 2:00 pm	at Baylor	L 57–100	3–5	Ferrell Center (6,372); Waco, TX
12/19/2013*; 2:00 pm	at Cal State Bakersfield	L 61–81	3–6	Icardo Center (154); Bakersfield, CA
12/21/2013*; 2:00 pm, BigWest.TV	at UC Davis	L 58–63 ^{OT}	3–7	The Pavilion (802); Davis, CA
12/28/2013*; 2:00 pm, LSN	Huston–Tillotson	W 99–48	4–7	Sharp Gymnasium (260); Houston, TX
01/02/2014; 2:30 pm	at Oral Roberts	L 73–85	4–8 (0–1)	Mabee Center (813); Tulsa, OK
01/04/2014; 2:00 pm	at Central Arkansas	L 54–67	4–9 (0–2)	Farris Center (550); Conway, AR
01/09/2014; 5:00 pm, LSN	Stephen F. Austin	L 60–71	4–10 (0–3)	Sharp Gymnasium (624); Houston, TX
01/11/2014; 3:00 pm, LSN	Northwestern State	W 67–56	5–10 (1–3)	Sharp Gymnasium (220); Houston, TX
01/16/2014; 5:30 pm	at Nicholls State	W 66–61	6–10 (2–3)	Stopher Gym (311); Thibodaux, LA
01/18/2014; 2:00 pm, ESPN3	at McNeese State	L 62–66	6–11 (2–4)	Burton Coliseum (1,161); Lake Charles, LA
01/23/2014; 5:00 pm, LSN	New Orleans	W 66–54	7–11 (3–4)	Sharp Gymnasium (219); Houston, TX
01/25/2014; 3:00 pm, LSN	Southeastern Louisiana	L 84–85 ^{2OT}	7–12 (3–5)	Sharp Gymnasium (375); Houston, TX
01/30/2014; 5:30 pm	at Lamar	W 76–66	8–12 (4–5)	Montagne Center (891); Beaumont, TX
02/01/2014; 2:00 pm	at Sam Houston State	W 63–62	9–12 (5–5)	Bernard Johnson Coliseum (843); Huntsville, TX
02/06/2014; 5:30 pm	at Abilene Christian	L 70–82	9–13 (5–6)	Moody Coliseum (897); Abilene, TX
02/08/2014; 2:00 pm	at Incarnate Word	W 70–65	10–13 (6–6)	McDermott Convocation Center (375); San Antonio, TX
02/13/2014; 5:00 pm, LSN	Oral Roberts	W 84–75	11–13 (7–6)	Sharp Gymnasium (524); Houston, TX
02/15/2014; 3:00 pm, LSN	Central Arkansas	L 55–57	11–14 (7–7)	Sharp Gymnasium (526); Houston, TX
02/22/2014; 3:00 pm, LSN	Texas A&M–Corpus Christi	L 62–74	11–15 (7–8)	Sharp Gymnasium (303); Houston, TX
03/01/2014; 12:00 pm	at Texas A&M–Corpus Christi	L 65–90	11–16 (7–9)	American Bank Center (1,002); Corpus Christi, TX
03/06/2014; 5:00 pm, LSN	Nicholls State	L 69–73	11–17 (7–10)	Sharp Gymnasium (820); Houston, TX
03/08/2014; 3:00 pm, LSN	McNeese State	W 77–67	12–17 (8–10)	Sharp Gymnasium (416); Houston, TX
*Non-conference game. ^{#}Rankings from AP Poll. (#) Tournament seedings in parentheses. All times are in Central.

== See also ==
2013–14 Houston Baptist Huskies men's basketball team
