= 2013–14 McNeese State Cowgirls basketball team =

Intercollegiate basketball season

2013–14 McNeese State Cowgirls basketball

2014 Women's Basketball Invitational, 1st Round
- Conference: Southland Conference
- Record: 19–14 (10–8 Southland)
- Head coach: Brooks Donald-Williams (7th season)
- Assistant coaches: Kacie Cryer (3rd season); Benjamin Law (1st season); Tyria Snow (1st season)
- Home arena: Burton Coliseum; Sudduth Coliseum

2013–14 Southland Conference women's basketball standings
	Conf.				Overall
Team	W		L	PCT	W		L	PCT
Lamar	13	–	5	.722	18	–	13	.581
Stephen F. Austin	13	–	5	.722	23	–	13	.639
Central Arkansas	12	–	6	.667	18	–	12	.600
Northwestern State†	11	–	7	.611	21	–	13	.618
Nicholls State	11	–	7	.611	17	–	14	.548
Texas A&M-CC	11	–	7	.611	18	–	12	.600
Abilene Christian*	8	–	6	.571	18	–	12	.600
McNeese State	10	–	8	.556	19	–	14	.576
Oral Roberts	8	–	10	.444	9	–	20	.310
Houston Baptist	8	–	10	.444	12	–	17	.414
Sam Houston State	8	–	10	.444	13	–	16	.448
Southeastern Louisiana	7	–	11	.389	8	–	22	.267
Incarnate Word*	2	–	12	.143	8	–	19	.296
New Orleans**	0	–	18	.000	0	–	29	.000
† 2014 Southland tournament winner As of March 22, 2014 *ineligible for postseason play due to Div. I transition **ineligible for postseason play due to APR penalties Rankings from AP poll

The 2013–14 McNeese State Cowgirls basketball team represented McNeese State University during the 2013–14 NCAA Division I women's basketball season. The Cowgirls were led by seventh year head coach Brooks Donald-Williams, played their home games at Burton Coliseum, with three home games at Sudduth Coliseum. They are members of the Southland Conference. At the conclusion of the 2014 Southland Conference women's basketball tournament the Cowgirls received an invitation to compete in the 2014 Women's Basketball Invitational tournament.

== Roster ==
Number	Name	Position	Height	Year	Hometown
1	Allison Baggett	Guard	5–9	Sophomore	Iota, Louisiana
3	Jayln Johnson	Guard	5–5	Sophomore	Jennings, Louisiana
12	Alaina Verden	Guard	5–9	Junior	Houma, Louisiana
21	Mercedes Rogers	Forward	6–0	Freshman	Crowley, Louisiana
22	Hannah Cupit	Guard	5–8	Freshman	Sulphur, Louisiana
23	Amber Donnes	Guard	5–9	Freshman	Hammond, Louisiana
24	Hailey Jenkins	Guard	5–9	Freshman	Ben Wheeler, Texas
25	Diamond Willis	Guard/Forward	6–1	Freshman	Shreveport, Louisiana
30	Cecilia Okoye	Forward	6–1	Senior	Mansfield, Texas
32	Arianna James	Forward	5–10	Senior	Reno, Nevada
33	Victoria Rachal	Guard	5–7	Freshman	Natchitoches, Louisiana
34	Talisa Boyd	Forward	6–0	Junior	Natchitoches, Louisiana
45	NeTanya Jones	Center	6–4	Junior	Oakdale, Louisiana

== Schedule ==
Date time, TV	Opponent	Result	Record	Site (attendance) city, state
Regular Season
11/08/2013*; 7:00 pm	Wiley College	W 88–69	1–0	Burton Coliseum (631); Lake Charles, LA
11/11/2013*; 7:00 pm	at Tulane	L 49–74	1–1	Devlin Fieldhouse (812); New Orleans, LA
11/14/2013*; 7:00 pm	Rice	W 65–54	2–1	Burton Coliseum (719); Lake Charles, LA
11/19/2013*; 7:00 pm	at Texas Southern	L 55–71	2–2	Health and Physical Education Arena (521); Houston, TX
11/27/2013*; 1:00 pm	at Fairleigh Dickinson	W 69–62	3–2	Rothman Center (135); Teaneck, NJ
11/29/2013*; 1:00 pm	at LIU Brooklyn; LIU Brooklyn Turkey Classic	W 71–57	4–2	Steinberg Wellness Center (203); Brooklyn, NY
11/30/2013*; 3:30 pm	vs. Georgia Tech; LIU Brooklyn Turkey Classic	L 60–69	4–3	Steinberg Wellness Center (175); Brooklyn, NY
12/11/2013*; 7:00 pm	Louisiana–Monroe	W 78–63	5–3	Burton Coliseum (457); Lake Charles, LA
12/17/2013*; 7:00 pm	Louisiana Tech	W 63–51	6–3	Burton Coliseum (394); Lake Charles, LA
12/19/2013*; 7:00 pm	SUNO	W 77–67	7–3	Burton Coliseum (332); Lake Charles, LA
12/28/2013*; 7:00 pm	at Baylor	L 57–82	7–4	Ferrell Center (6,927); Waco, Texas
01/02/2014; 5:30 pm	Southeastern Louisiana	L 65–82	7–5 (0–1)	Burton Coliseum (1,063); Lake Charles, LA
01/04/2014; 1:00 pm	New Orleans	W 82–59	8–5 (1–1)	Burton Coliseum (573); Lake Charles, LA
01/09/2014; 5:30 pm	at Sam Houston State	W 59–55	9–5 (2–1)	Bernard Johnson Coliseum (345); Huntsville, TX
01/11/2014; 4:00 pm	at Lamar	L 58–72	9–6 (2–2)	Montagne Center (872); Beaumont, TX
01/16/2014; 5:30 pm	Texas A&M–Corpus Christi	W 79–51	10–6 (3–2)	Burton Coliseum (537); Lake Charles, LA
01/18/2014; 1:00 pm, ESPN3	Houston Baptist	W 66–62	11–6 (4–2)	Burton Coliseum (1,161); Lake Charles, LA
01/21/2014; 5:30 pm	Nicholls State	L 63–71	11–7 (4–3)	Sudduth Coliseum (723); Lake Charles, LA
01/30/2014; 5:30 pm	Central Arkansas	L 50–65	11–8 (4–4)	Sudduth Coliseum (1,003); Lake Charles, LA
02/01/2014; 1:00 pm	Oral Roberts	W 73–57	12–8 (5–4)	Sudduth Coliseum (1,101); Lake Charles, LA
02/06/2014; 5:30 pm, ESPN3	Northwestern State	W 59–57	13–8 (6–4)	Prather Coliseum (1,531); Natchitoches, LA
02/08/2014; 4:00 pm	at Stephen F. Austin	L 49–69	13–9 (6–5)	William R. Johnson Coliseum (2,028); Nacogdoches, TX
02/13/2014; 5:00 pm	at Southeastern Louisiana	W 75–61	14–9 (7–5)	University Center (542); Hammond, LA
02/16/2014; 2:00 pm	at New Orleans	W 84–54	15–9 (8–5)	Lakefront Arena (691); New Orleans, LA
02/22/2014; 1:00 pm	at Nicholls State	L 66–76	15–10 (8–6)	Stopher Gym (421); Thibodaux, LA
02/27/2014; 5:30 pm	Incarnate Word	W 92–37	16–10 (9–6)	Burton Coliseum (523); Lake Charles, LA
03/01/2014; 1:00 pm	Abilene Christian	W 71–64	17–10 (10–6)	Burton Coliseum (571); Lake Charles, LA
03/06/2014; 5:00 pm	at Texas A&M–Corpus Christi	L 69–74	17–11 (10–7)	American Bank Center (819); Corpus Christi, TX
03/08/2014; 3:00 pm	at Houston Baptist	L 67–77	17–12 (10–8)	Sharp Gymnasium (416); Houston, TX
2014 Southland Conference women's basketball tournament
03/13/2014; 1:30 pm	vs. Texas A&M–Corpus Christi; 2014 Southland Conference women's basketball tournament	W 78–73	18–12	Leonard E. Merrill Center (416); Katy, TX
03/14/2014; 1:30 pm	vs. Central Arkansas; 2014 Southland Conference women's basketball tournament	W 66–62	19–12	Leonard E. Merrill Center (709); Katy, TX
03/15/2014; 2:30 pm	vs. Stephen F. Austin; 2014 Southland Conference women's basketball tournament	L 54–80	19–13	Leonard E. Merrill Center (1,183); Katy, TX
2014 Women's Basketball Invitational
03/20/2014; 6:00 pm	vs. Northern Kentucky; 2014 Women's Basketball Invitational	L 72–84	19–14	The Bank of Kentucky Center (612); Highland Heights, KY
*Non-conference game. ^{#}Rankings from AP Poll. (#) Tournament seedings in parentheses. All times are in Central Time.

== See also ==
2013–14 McNeese State Cowboys basketball team
