= 2013–14 Southeastern Louisiana Lady Lions basketball team =

Intercollegiate basketball season

2013–14 Southeastern Louisiana Lady Lions basketball
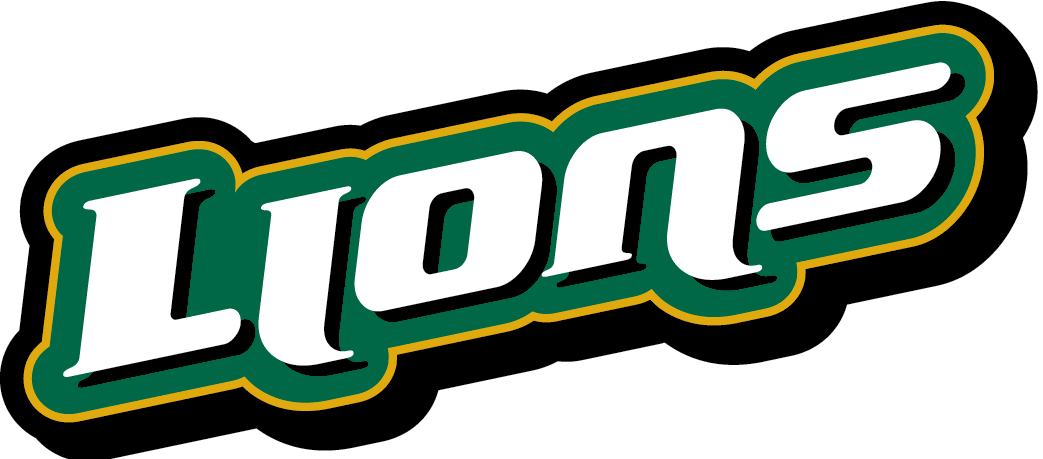
- Conference: Southland Conference
- Record: 8–22 (7–11 Southland)
- Head coach: Lori Davis Jones (11th season)
- Assistant coach: Eric Dumas (9th season)
- Home arena: University Center

2013–14 Southland Conference women's basketball standings
	Conf.				Overall
Team	W		L	PCT	W		L	PCT
Lamar	13	–	5	.722	18	–	13	.581
Stephen F. Austin	13	–	5	.722	23	–	13	.639
Central Arkansas	12	–	6	.667	18	–	12	.600
Northwestern State†	11	–	7	.611	21	–	13	.618
Nicholls State	11	–	7	.611	17	–	14	.548
Texas A&M-CC	11	–	7	.611	18	–	12	.600
Abilene Christian*	8	–	6	.571	18	–	12	.600
McNeese State	10	–	8	.556	19	–	14	.576
Oral Roberts	8	–	10	.444	9	–	20	.310
Houston Baptist	8	–	10	.444	12	–	17	.414
Sam Houston State	8	–	10	.444	13	–	16	.448
Southeastern Louisiana	7	–	11	.389	8	–	22	.267
Incarnate Word*	2	–	12	.143	8	–	19	.296
New Orleans**	0	–	18	.000	0	–	29	.000
† 2014 Southland tournament winner As of March 22, 2014 *ineligible for postseason play due to Div. I transition **ineligible for postseason play due to APR penalties Rankings from AP poll

The 2013–14 Southeastern Louisiana Lady Lions basketball team represented Southeastern Louisiana University during the 2013–14 NCAA Division I women's basketball season. The Lady Lions were led by tenth-year head coach Lori Davis Jones and played their home games at the University Center. They were members of the Southland Conference. The Lady Lions entered the season with only one assistant coach after Bob Austin was hired as the head coach at LSU-Alexandria.

== Roster ==
Number	Name	Position	Height	Year	Hometown
2	Aja Gibson	Forward	6–1	RS senior	Somerville, Tennessee
3	Peaches Anderson	Guard	5–8	Sophomore	Meridian, Michigan
4	Annessa De La Cruz	Guard	5–9	Junior	Los Angeles, California
11	Elizabeth Styles	Guard	5–3	Junior	Savannah, Georgia
13	Erica Hernandez	Guard	5–9	Sophomore	Floresville, Texas
20	Dani Fielder	Forward	5–11	Freshman	Houston, Texas
22	Chey Stewart	Forward	6–1	Freshman	Wylie, Texas
23	Jameika Hoskins	Guard	5–10	Senior	Aberdeen, Mississippi
24	Symone Miller	Guard	5–4	Junior	Gonzales, Louisiana
33	Adrina LaVern	Forward	5–10	Junior	Anchorage, Alaska
42	Nanna Pool	Forward	6–1	Sophomore	Magnolia, Mississippi

== Schedule ==
Date time, TV	Opponent	Result	Record	Site (attendance) city, state
Exhibition
11/26/2013*; 5:00 pm	William Carey	W 81–59	-	University Center (N/A); Hammond, LA
Regular season
11/08/2013*; 7:00 pm	Mobile (AL)	W 79–68	1–0	University Center (451); Hammond, LA
11/11/2013*; 5:30 pm	at Southern	L 56–63	1–1	F. G. Clark Center (312); Baton Rouge, LA
11/15/2013*; 7:00 pm	at Louisiana–Monroe	L 77–87	1–2	Fant–Ewing Coliseum (922); Monroe, LA
11/19/2013*; 7:00 pm	at Tulane	L 52–80	1–3	Devlin Fieldhouse (618); New Orleans, LA
11/22/2013*; 5:00 pm	at Ole Miss	L 69–96	1–4	Tad Smith Coliseum (6,267); Oxford, MS
11/29/2013*; 11:00 am	vs. Middle Tennessee; Gulf Coast Showcase	L 71–88	1–5	Germain Arena (N/A); Estero, FL
11/30/2013*; 12:00 pm	vs. NC State; Gulf Coast Showdown	L 59–87	1–6	Germain Arena (N/A); Estero, FL
12/01/2013*; 8:30 am	vs. Grand Canyon; Gulf Coast Showdown	L 57–62	1–7	Germain Arena (N/A); Estero, FL
12/04/2013*; 7:00 pm	at SMU	L 39–82	1–8	Moody Coliseum (366); University Park, TX
12/15/2013*; 3:00 pm	at UTEP	L 65–87	1–9	Don Haskins Center (1,024); El Paso, TX
12/20/2013*; 7:00 pm	at Mississippi State	L 57–109	1–10	Humphrey Coliseum (2,017); Starkville, MS
12/29/2013*; 5:00 pm	at Louisiana–Lafayette	L 53–66	1–11	Cajundome (287); Lafayette, LA
01/02/2014; 5:30 pm	at McNeese State	W 82–65	2–11 (1–0)	Burton Coliseum (1,063); Lake Charles, LA
01/04/2014; 1:00 pm	at Nicholls State	L 55–84	2–12 (1–1)	Stopher Gym (228); Thibodaux, LA
01/09/2014; 5:00 pm	Incarnate Word	W 67–55	3–12 (2–1)	University Center (327); Hammond, LA
01/16/2014; 5:00 pm	Sam Houston State	L 85–86	3–13 (2–2)	University Center (268); Hammond, LA
01/18/2014; 2:00 pm	Lamar	W 67–62	4–13 (3–2)	University Center (467); Hammond, LA
01/23/2014; 5:00 pm	at Texas A&M–Corpus Christi	L 54–83	4–14 (3–3)	American Bank Center (1,194); Corpus Christi, TX
01/25/2014; 3:00 pm	at Houston Baptist	W 85–84 ^{2OT}	5–14 (4–3)	Sharp Gymnasium (375); Houston, TX
01/30/2014; 5:00 pm	New Orleans	W 84–55	6–14 (5–3)	University Center (369); Hammond, LA
02/06/2014; 5:30 pm	at Central Arkansas	L 78–81	6–15 (5–4)	Farris Center (1,243); Conway, AR
02/08/2014; 4:00 pm	at Oral Roberts	L 78–81	6–16 (5–5)	Mabee Center (1,243); Tulsa, OK
02/13/2014; 5:00 pm	McNeese State	L 61–75	6–17 (5–6)	University Center (542); Hammond, LA
02/15/2014; 2:00 pm	Nicholls State	W 68–66	7–17 (6–6)	University Center (517); Hammond, LA
02/20/2014; 5:30 pm	at New Orleans	W 76–59	8–17 (7–6)	Lakefront Arena (492); New Orleans, LA
02/27/2014; 5:00 pm, ESPN3	Northwestern State	L 58–73	8–18 (7–7)	University Center (512); Hammond, LA
03/01/2014; 2:00 pm	Stephen F. Austin	L 79–92	8–19 (7–8)	University Center (312); Hammond, LA
03/03/2014; 1:00 pm	Abilene Christian	L 82–96	8–20 (7–9)	University Center (230); Hammond, LA
03/06/2014; 5:30 pm	at Sam Houston State	L 73–93	8–21 (7–10)	Bernard Johnson Coliseum (456); Huntsville, TX
03/08/2014; 4:00 pm	at Lamar	L 77–92	8–22 (7–11)	Montagne Center (824); Beaumont, TX
*Non-conference game. ^{#}Rankings from AP Poll. (#) Tournament seedings in parentheses. All times are in Central Time.

== See also ==
- 2013–14 Southeastern Louisiana Lions basketball team
