= 2013–14 Incarnate Word Cardinals women's basketball team =

Intercollegiate basketball season

2013–14 Incarnate Word Cardinals women's basketball

2013 PSN Sports Challenge, Champion
- Conference: Southland Conference
- Record: 8–19 (2–12 Southland (1st Year of Transition))
- Head coach: Kate Henderson (1st- Interim season)
- Assistant coaches: Christian Mueller (1st season); Jamie Nash (1st season); Brittany Hardy (1st season)
- Home arena: McDermott Convocation Center

2013–14 Southland Conference women's basketball standings
	Conf.				Overall
Team	W		L	PCT	W		L	PCT
Lamar	13	–	5	.722	18	–	13	.581
Stephen F. Austin	13	–	5	.722	23	–	13	.639
Central Arkansas	12	–	6	.667	18	–	12	.600
Northwestern State†	11	–	7	.611	21	–	13	.618
Nicholls State	11	–	7	.611	17	–	14	.548
Texas A&M-CC	11	–	7	.611	18	–	12	.600
Abilene Christian*	8	–	6	.571	18	–	12	.600
McNeese State	10	–	8	.556	19	–	14	.576
Oral Roberts	8	–	10	.444	9	–	20	.310
Houston Baptist	8	–	10	.444	12	–	17	.414
Sam Houston State	8	–	10	.444	13	–	16	.448
Southeastern Louisiana	7	–	11	.389	8	–	22	.267
Incarnate Word*	2	–	12	.143	8	–	19	.296
New Orleans**	0	–	18	.000	0	–	29	.000
† 2014 Southland tournament winner As of March 22, 2014 *ineligible for postseason play due to Div. I transition **ineligible for postseason play due to APR penalties Rankings from AP poll

The 2013–14 Incarnate Word Cardinals women's basketball team represented the University of the Incarnate Word during the 2013–14 NCAA Division I women's basketball season. The Cardinals were led by first year head coach Kate Henderson, acting as Interim head coach, and played their home games at McDermott Convocation Center. They were new members of the Southland Conference.

2013–14 was year 1 of a 4-year transitional period for Incarnate Word from D2 to D1. During year 1 they only played conference opponents once, with the exception of Abilene Christian. They were classified as a D2 school for scheduling purposes. Since Abilene Christian was also transitioning, they played them twice. Incarnate Word could not win the regular season basketball title for the 2013–14 season.

In years 2–4 Incarnate Word will be classified as a D1 school for scheduling purposes. They will increase the number of conference games to a regular schedule, and they can win the regular season conference title. However Incarnate Word cannot participate in the conference tourney until the 2017–18 season, at which time they will also be able to enter the NCAA tournament, should they win the conference. Incarnate Word is eligible to participate in the WBI or WNIT should they be invited.

== Audio Streaming ==
All Incarnate Word games were broadcast on KUIW Radio, and they provided streaming of all non-televised home games shown via UIW TV.

== Roster ==
Number	Name	Position	Height	Year	Hometown
2	Rose Whitehead	Center	6–2	Senior	Grapevine, Texas
4	Ifunanya Mora	Guard/Forward	5–9	Senior	Grand Prairie, Texas
5	Anita Kaduru	Guard	5–7	Freshman	Sugarland, Texas
10	Natalie Hessong	Guard	5–9	Freshman	Corpus Christi, Texas
11	Alyssa Ward	Guard	5–8	Freshman	Palmetto, Florida
13	Katie Novak	Guard	5–9	Senior	Homer Glen, Illinois
15	Michelle Hale	Forward	5–10	Senior	Albuquerque, New Mexico
20	Joslinn Douglass	Guard	5–2	Senior	Austin, Texas
21	Cheyenne Berry	Guard	5–9	Senior	Lytle, Texas
24	Kosisio Mora	Guard/Forward	5–9	Senior	Grand Prairie, Texas
32	Brianna Birmingham	Forward	6–0	Junior	Battle Creek, Michigan
34	Shelby Leinneweber	Center	6–1	Freshman	Floresville, Texas

== Schedule ==
Date time, TV	Opponent	Result	Record	Site (attendance) city, state
Regular Season
11/09/2013*; 12:00 pm	Wayland Baptist	W 81–73	1–0	McDermott Convocation Center (256); San Antonio, TX
11/14/2013*; 7:00 pm	at UT Arlington	W 52–48	2–0	College Park Center (663); Arlington, TX
11/16/2013*; 2:00 pm	vs. Texas Wesleyan; St. Thomas Tournament	W 84–73	3–0	Jerabeck Athletic Center (N/A); Houston, TX
11/17/2013*; 2:00 pm	at St. Thomas (Houston); St. Thomas Tournament	W 71–67	4–0	Jerabeck Athletic Center (N/A); Houston, TX
11/20/2013*; 5:30 pm	Our Lady of the Lake	W 99–73	5–0	McDermott Convocation Center (169); San Antonio, TX
11/23/2013*; 1:00 pm	at Wiley College	L 71–83	5–1	Alumni Gymnasium (348); Marshall, TX
11/29/2013*; 5:00 pm	at West Texas A&M; Lady Buff Classic	L 51–71	5–2	First United Bank Center (851); Canyon, TX
11/30/2013*; 12:00 pm	vs. Angelo State; Lady Buff Classic	L 43–58	5–3	First United Bank Center (183); Canyon, TX
12/10/2013*; 7:00 pm	at Arkansas–Little Rock	L 34–82	5–4	Jack Stephens Center (1,023); Little Rock, AR
12/18/2013*; 5:30 pm	St. Thomas (Houston)	W 67–50	6–4	McDermott Convocation Center (156); San Antonio, TX
12/21/2013*; 2:00 pm	at Angelo State	L 51–60	6–5	Stephens Arena (280); San Angelo, TX
01/03/2014*; 7:00 pm	at Rice	L 57–72	6–6	Tudor Fieldhouse (393); Houston, TX
01/09/2014; 5:00 pm	at Southeastern Louisiana	L 55–67	6–7 (0–1)	University Center (327); Hammond, LA
01/11/2014; 4:00 pm	at New Orleans	W 67–38	7–7 (1–1)	Lakefront Arena (432); New Orleans, LA
01/16/2014; 5:30 pm	Central Arkansas	L 40–60	7–8 (1–2)	McDermott Convocation Center (752); San Antonio, TX
01/18/2014; 2:00 pm	Oral Roberts	W 67–64	8–8 (2–2)	McDermott Convocation Center (386); San Antonio, TX
01/23/2014; 5:30 pm	Sam Houston State	L 51–60	8–9 (2–3)	McDermott Convocation Center (332); San Antonio, TX
01/25/2014; 2:00 pm	Lamar	L 69–76	8–10 (2–4)	McDermott Convocation Center (375); San Antonio, TX
01/30/2014; 5:30 pm	at Northwestern State	L 66–72	8–11 (2–5)	Prather Coliseum (1,031); Natchitoches, LA
02/01/2014; 4:00 pm	at Stephen F. Austin	L 59–79	8–12 (2–6)	William R. Johnson Coliseum (1,197); Nacogdoches, TX
02/06/2014; 5:30 pm	Texas A&M–Corpus Christi	L 56–60	8–13 (2–7)	McDermott Convocation Center (316); San Antonio, TX
02/08/2014; 2:00 pm	Houston Baptist	L 65–70	8–14 (2–8)	McDermott Convocation Center (375); San Antonio, TX
02/13/2014; 5:30 pm, ESPN3	Abilene Christian	L 67–73	8–15 (2–9)	McDermott Convocation Center (456); San Antonio, TX
02/22/2014*; 2:00 pm	NJIT	L 48–57	8–16	McDermott Convocation Center (225); San Antonio, TX
02/27/2013; 5:30 pm	at McNeese State	L 37–92	8–17 (2–10)	Burton Coliseum (523); Lake Charles, LA
03/01/2014; 1:00 pm	at Nicholls State	L 64–76	8–18 (2–11)	Stopher Gym (305); Thibodaux, LA
03/08/2014; 1:00 pm	at Abilene Christian	L 79–90	8–19 (2–12)	Moody Coliseum (1,382); Abilene, TX
*Non-conference game. ^{#}Rankings from AP Poll. (#) Tournament seedings in parentheses. All times are in Central Time.

== See also ==
- 2013–14 Incarnate Word Cardinals men's basketball team
