= 2013–14 New Orleans Privateers women's basketball team =

Intercollegiate basketball season

2013–14 New Orleans Privateers women's basketball
- Conference: Southland Conference
- Record: 0–29 (0–18 Southland)
- Head coach: Keeshawn Davenport (3rd season)
- Assistant coaches: Alpha English (3rd season); Tamika Collins (2nd season)
- Home arena: Lakefront Arena

2013–14 Southland Conference women's basketball standings
	Conf.				Overall
Team	W		L	PCT	W		L	PCT
Lamar	13	–	5	.722	18	–	13	.581
Stephen F. Austin	13	–	5	.722	23	–	13	.639
Central Arkansas	12	–	6	.667	18	–	12	.600
Northwestern State†	11	–	7	.611	21	–	13	.618
Nicholls State	11	–	7	.611	17	–	14	.548
Texas A&M-CC	11	–	7	.611	18	–	12	.600
Abilene Christian*	8	–	6	.571	18	–	12	.600
McNeese State	10	–	8	.556	19	–	14	.576
Oral Roberts	8	–	10	.444	9	–	20	.310
Houston Baptist	8	–	10	.444	12	–	17	.414
Sam Houston State	8	–	10	.444	13	–	16	.448
Southeastern Louisiana	7	–	11	.389	8	–	22	.267
Incarnate Word*	2	–	12	.143	8	–	19	.296
New Orleans**	0	–	18	.000	0	–	29	.000
† 2014 Southland tournament winner As of March 22, 2014 *ineligible for postseason play due to Div. I transition **ineligible for postseason play due to APR penalties Rankings from AP poll

The 2013–14 New Orleans Privateers women's basketball team represented the University of New Orleans during the 2013–14 NCAA Division I women's basketball season. The Privateers were led by third year head coach Keeshawn Davenport and played their home games at Lakefront Arena. The 2013–14 season was the Privateers' initial season as a member of the Southland Conference.

== Roster ==
Number	Name	Position	Height	Year	Hometown
1	Jewel Angelo	Guard	5–11	Freshman	Manvel, Texas
3	Samantha Gray	Guard	5–4	Senior	Quitman, Louisiana
4	Ariele Davis	Guard	5–8	Freshman	Alexandria, Louisiana
14	Raven Coleman	Guard	6–0	Freshman	Marrero, Louisiana
20	Dasia Batiste	Guard	5–7	Freshman	Houston, Texas
21	Octavia Wilson	Guard	5–9	Freshman	Nicholasville, Kentucky
22	Mathilde Fogelstrom	Forward/Center	6–2	Sophomore	Copenhagen, Denmark
23	Jordan Carr	Guard	5–7	Junior	Raleigh, North Carolina
25	Melissa Jensen	Forward	6–1	RS Junior	Aarhus, Denmark
30	BriAnna Shavers	Forward	6–0	Freshman	Carrollton, Texas
31	Dannisha Jackson	Guard/Forward	5–10	Junior	Shreveport, Louisiana
32	Danielle Davis	Guard	5–8	Sophomore	Oakton, Virginia
33	Hayley Alexander	Guard	5–7	Sophomore	Long Beach, New York
35	Yasmin Taylor	Guard	5–10	Sophomore	Metairie, Louisiana
40	Amber Clay	Forward	6–1	Senior	Blytheville, Arkansas

== Schedule ==
Date time, TV	Rank^{#}	Opponent^{#}	Result	Record	Site (attendance) city, state
Regular Season
11/08/2013*; 6:00 pm		Tulane	L 46–81	0–1	Devlin Fieldhouse (1,227); New Orleans, LA
11/14/2013*; 7:00 pm		Grambling State	L 52–76	0–2	Lakefront Arena (341); New Orleans, LA
11/17/2013*; 3:00 pm		at Mississippi State	L 38–111	0–3	Humphrey Coliseum (2,251); Starkville, MS
11/23/2013*; 1:30 pm		Jacksonville State	L 51–54	0–4	Lakefront Arena (1,894); New Orleans, LA
11/29/2013*; 6:30 pm		at Louisiana Tech	L 39–69	0–5	Thomas Assembly Center (1,217); Rustin, LA
12/05/2013*; 7:00 pm		at Jackson State	L 50–72	0–6	Williams Assembly Center (N/A); Jackson, MS
12/07/2013*; 1:00 pm		at Murray State	L 47–88	0–7	CFSB Center (480); Murray, KY
12/14/2013*; 4:15 pm		Louisiana–Lafayette	L 42–71	0–8	Lakefront Arena (339); New Orleans, LA
12/16/2013*; 5:30 pm		vs. No. 14 North Carolina; Carolinas Challenge	L 41–124	0–9	Myrtle Beach Convention Center (N/A); Myrtle Beach, SC
12/21/2013*; 2:00 pm		at Southern Miss	L 61–83	0–10	Reed Green Coliseum (947); Hattiesburg, MS
12/28/2013*; 4:00 pm		at Utah Valley	L 49–89	0–11	UCCU Center (184); Orem, UT
01/02/2014; 5:30 pm		at Nicholls State	L 40–89	0–12 (0–1)	Stopher Gym (359); Thibodaux, LA
01/04/2013; 5:30 pm		at McNeese State	L 59–82	0–13 (0–2)	Burton Coliseum (573); Lake Charles, LA
01/09/2014; 5:30 pm		Abilene Christian	L 44–88	0–14 (0–3)	Lakefront Arena (583); New Orleans, LA
01/11/2014; 4:00 pm		Incarnate Word	L 38–67	0–15 (0–4)	Lakefront Arena (432); New Orleans, LA
01/16/2014; 5:30 pm, ESPN3		Lamar	L 53–80	0–16 (0–5)	Lakefront Arena (438); New Orleans, LA
01/18/2014; 4:00 pm		Sam Houston State	L 47–78	0–17 (0–6)	Lakefront Arena (458); New Orleans, LA
01/23/2014; 5:00 pm		at Houston Baptist	L 54–66	0–18 (0–7)	Sharp Gymnasium (219); Houston, TX
01/25/2014; 4:00 pm		at Texas A&M–Corpus Christi	L 44–97	0–19 (0–8)	American Bank Center (1,810); Corpus Christi, TX
01/30/2014; 5:00 pm		at Southeastern Louisiana	L 55–84	0–20 (0–9)	University Center (369); Hammond, LA
02/06/2014; 5:00 pm		at Oral Roberts	L 62–93	0–21 (0–10)	Mabee Center (1,094); Tulsa, OK
02/08/2014; 2:00 pm, ESPN3		at Central Arkansas	L 30–62	0–22 (0–11)	Farris Center (881); Conway, AR
02/13/2014; 5:30 pm		Nicholls State	L 45–63	0–23 (0–12)	Lakefront Arena (718); New Orleans, LA
02/16/2014; 2:00 pm		McNeese State	L 54–84	0–24 (0–13)	Lakefront Arena (691); New Orleans, LA
02/20/2014; 5:30 pm		Southeastern Louisiana	L 59–76	0–25 (0–14)	Lakefront Arena (492); New Orleans, LA
02/27/2014; 5:30 pm		Stephen F. Austin	L 36–68	0–26 (0–15)	Lakefront Arena (524); New Orleans, LA
03/02/2014; 4:00 pm		Northwestern State	L 48–51	0–27 (0–16)	Lakefront Arena (305); New Orleans, LA
03/06/2014; 5:30 pm		at Lamar	L 51–83	0–28 (0–17)	Montagne Center (890); Beaumont, TX
03/08/2014; 2:00 pm		at Sam Houston State	L 56–87	0–29 (0–18)	Bernard Johnson Coliseum (456); Huntsville, TX
*Non-conference game. ^{#}Rankings from AP Poll. (#) Tournament seedings in parentheses. All times are in Central Time.

== See also ==
- 2013–14 New Orleans Privateers men's basketball team
