= 2013–14 Northwestern State Lady Demons basketball team =

Intercollegiate basketball season

2013–14 Northwestern State Lady Demons basketball

2014 Southland Conference women's basketball tournament

2014 NCAA Division I women's basketball tournament, 1st Round
- Conference: Southland Conference
- Record: 21–13 (11–7 Southland)
- Head coach: Brooke Stoehr & Scott Stoehr (2nd season)
- Assistant coaches: Learie Sandy (1st season); Kasondra Foreman (1st season)
- Home arena: Prather Coliseum

2013–14 Southland Conference women's basketball standings
	Conf.				Overall
Team	W		L	PCT	W		L	PCT
Lamar	13	–	5	.722	18	–	13	.581
Stephen F. Austin	13	–	5	.722	23	–	13	.639
Central Arkansas	12	–	6	.667	18	–	12	.600
Northwestern State†	11	–	7	.611	21	–	13	.618
Nicholls State	11	–	7	.611	17	–	14	.548
Texas A&M-CC	11	–	7	.611	18	–	12	.600
Abilene Christian*	8	–	6	.571	18	–	12	.600
McNeese State	10	–	8	.556	19	–	14	.576
Oral Roberts	8	–	10	.444	9	–	20	.310
Houston Baptist	8	–	10	.444	12	–	17	.414
Sam Houston State	8	–	10	.444	13	–	16	.448
Southeastern Louisiana	7	–	11	.389	8	–	22	.267
Incarnate Word*	2	–	12	.143	8	–	19	.296
New Orleans**	0	–	18	.000	0	–	29	.000
† 2014 Southland tournament winner As of March 22, 2014 *ineligible for postseason play due to Div. I transition **ineligible for postseason play due to APR penalties Rankings from AP poll

The 2013–14 Northwestern State Lady Demons basketball team represented Northwestern State University during the 2013–14 NCAA Division I women's basketball season. The Demons, led by second-year co-head coaches Brooke Stoehr and Scott Stoehr, played their home games at Prather Coliseum and were members of the Southland Conference. As champions of the 2014 Southland Conference women's basketball tournament, the Lady Demons received the conference automatic bid to the 2014 NCAA Division I women's basketball tournament.

== Roster ==
Number	Name	Position	Height	Year	Hometown
1	Amy Staha	Guard	5–10	Freshman	Pflugerville, Texas
2	Emily Spector	Guard/forward	5–10	Freshman	Keller, Texas
3	Keisha Lee	Guard	5–5	Sophomore	Denham Springs, Louisiana
11	Breanna Fuller	Post	6–2	Sophomore	Huntsville, Texas
12	Chelsea Rogers	Guard	5–9	Junior	Ruston, Louisiana
13	Janelle Perez	Guard	5–2	Sophomore	El Paso, Texas
14	Meredith Graf	Guard	5–8	Senior	Natchitoches, Louisiana
15	Presley Owens	Forward	6–1	Junior	Vancleave, Mississippi
20	Arianne Ausmer	Guard	5–5	Junior	Pass Christian, Mississippi
24	Jasmine Bradley	Guard	5–8	Junior	Pass Christian, Mississippi
30	Beatrice Attura	Guard	5–7	Freshman	Frisco, Texas
31	Trudy Armstead	Forward	6–1	Senior	Dallas, Texas
32	Breonna O'Conner	Guard	5–7	Freshman	Ville Platte, Louisiana
34	Kourtney Pennywell	Forward	5–10	Freshman	Shreveport, Louisiana
50	Robin Richardson	Guard	5–9	Freshman	Independence, Louisiana

== Media ==
Select Lady Demon basketball games were available through a Northwestern feed at Demons Showcase. Many opponents had a live audio stream available to listen to the games live that were not aired on Demons Showcase. NSU TV also broadcast most of the Lady Demons wins, tape-delayed.

== Schedule ==
Date time, TV	Rank^{#}	Opponent^{#}	Result	Record	Site (attendance) city, state
Regular season
11/08/2013*; 5:30 pm		Southern Arkansas	W 77–53	1–0	Prather Coliseum (1,131); Natchitoches, LA
11/13/2013*; 7:00 pm		Houston	W 74–70	2–0	Prather Coliseum (603); Natchitoches, LA
11/21/2013*; 5:00 pm		vs. UTSA; Athletes in Action Classic	L 49–62	2–1	Ferrell Center (7,072); Waco, TX
11/22/2013*; 7:00 pm		at Baylor; Athletes in Action Classic	L 54–88	2–2	Ferrell Center (6,622); Waco, TX
11/23/2013*; 5:00 pm		vs. Savannah State; Athletes in Action Classic	W 77–56	3–2	Ferrell Center (7,068); Waco, TX
12/02/2013*; 7:00 pm		Jackson State	W 71–52	4–2	Prather Coliseum (303); Natchitoches, LA
12/07/2013*; 2:00 pm		at Arkansas	L 53–74	4–3	Bud Walton Arena (1,331); Fayetteville, AR
12/11/2013*; 6:00 pm		at Louisiana Tech	L 40–74	4–4	Thomas Assembly Center (N/A); Ruston, LA
12/17/2013*; 7:00 pm		Arkansas-Monticello	W 63–40	5–4	Prather Coliseum (612); Natchitoches, LA
12/20/2013*; 7:00 pm, LONG		at Texas	L 60–90	5–5	Frank Erwin Center (2,584); Austin, TX
12/28/2013*; 12:00 pm		vs. New Mexico State; UTSA Holiday Classic	W 73–63	6–5	Convocation Center (508); San Antonio, TX
12/29/2013*; 12:00 pm		vs. North Dakota State; UTSA Holiday Classic	W 57–50	7–5	Convocation Center (N/A); San Antonio, TX
01/02/2014; 5:30 pm		Sam Houston State	W 78–59	8–5 (1–0)	Prather Coliseum (903); Natchitoches, LA
01/04/2014; 1:00 pm		Lamar	L 79–84	8–6 (1–1)	Prather Coliseum (731); Natchitoches, LA
01/09/2014; 5:00 pm		at Texas A&M–Corpus Christi	W 65–59	9–6 (2–1)	American Bank Center (1,220); Corpus Christi, TX
01/11/2014; 3:00 pm		at Houston Baptist	L 56–67	9–7 (2–2)	Sharp Gymnasium (220); Houston, TX
01/16/2014; 5:30 pm		Stephen F. Austin	W 66–54	10–7 (3–2)	Prather Coliseum (1,031); Natchitoches, LA
01/23/2014; 5:30 pm		at Central Arkansas	L 61–73	10–8 (3–3)	Farris Center (1,158); Conway, AR
01/25/2014; 12:30 pm		Oral Roberts	L 51–62	10–9 (3–4)	Mabee Center (664); Tulsa, OK
01/30/2014; 5:30 pm		Incarnate Word	W 72–66	11–9 (4–4)	Prather Coliseum (1,031); Natchitoches, LA
02/01/2014; 1:00 pm		Abilene Christian	W 67–62	12–9 (5–4)	Prather Coliseum (1,031); Natchitoches, LA
02/06/2014; 5:30 pm, ESPN3		McNeese State	L 57–59	12–10 (5–5)	Prather Coliseum (1,531); Natchitoches, LA
02/08/2014; 1:00 pm		Nicholls State	W 76–60	13–10 (6–5)	Prather Coliseum (1,164); Natchitoches, LA
02/13/2014; 5:30 pm		at Sam Houston State	L 53–57	13–11 (6–6)	Bernard Johnson Coliseum (456); Huntsville, TX
02/15/2014; 4:00 pm		at Lamar	W 67–60	14–11 (7–6)	Montagne Center (759); Beaumont, TX
02/22/2014; 4:00 pm		at Stephen F. Austin	L 51–68	14–12 (7–7)	William R. Johnson Coliseum (3,671); Nacogdoches, TX
02/27/2014; 5:00 pm, ESPN3		at Southeastern Louisiana	W 73–59	15–12 (8–7)	University Center (512); Hammond, LA
03/01/2014; 4:00 pm		at New Orleans	W 51–48	16–12 (9–7)	Lakefront Arena (305); New Orleans, LA
03/06/2014; 5:30 pm		Central Arkansas	W 77–45	17–12 (10–7)	Prather Coliseum (1,431); Natchitoches, LA
03/08/2014; 1:00 pm		Oral Roberts	W 71–49	18–12 (11–7)	Prather Coliseum (1,431); Natchitoches, LA
2014 Southland Conference women's basketball tournament
03/14/2014; 11:00 am, SLC Digital	(4)	vs. (5) Nicholls State; Quarterfinals	W 69–65	19–12	Leonard E. Merrell Center (709); Katy, TX
03/15/2014; 12:00 pm, ESPN3	(4)	vs. (1) Lamar; Semifinals	W 61–60	20–12	Leonard E. Merrell Center (N/A); Katy, TX
03/16/2014; 12:00 pm, CBSSN	(4)	vs. (2) Stephen F. Austin; Championship Game	W 62–44	21–12	Leonard E. Merrell Center (806); Katy, TX
2014 NCAA Division I women's basketball tournament
03/22/2014; 3:00 pm, ESPN2	(16)	at (1) No. 3 Tennessee; First round	L 46–70	21–13	Thompson-Boling Arena (7,128); Knoxville, TN
*Non-conference game. ^{#}Rankings from AP Poll. (#) Tournament seedings in parentheses. All times are in Central Time..

== See also ==
- 2013–14 Northwestern State Demons basketball team
