= 2013–14 Texas Southern Lady Tigers basketball team =

Intercollegiate basketball season

2013–14 Texas Southern Lady Tigers basketball
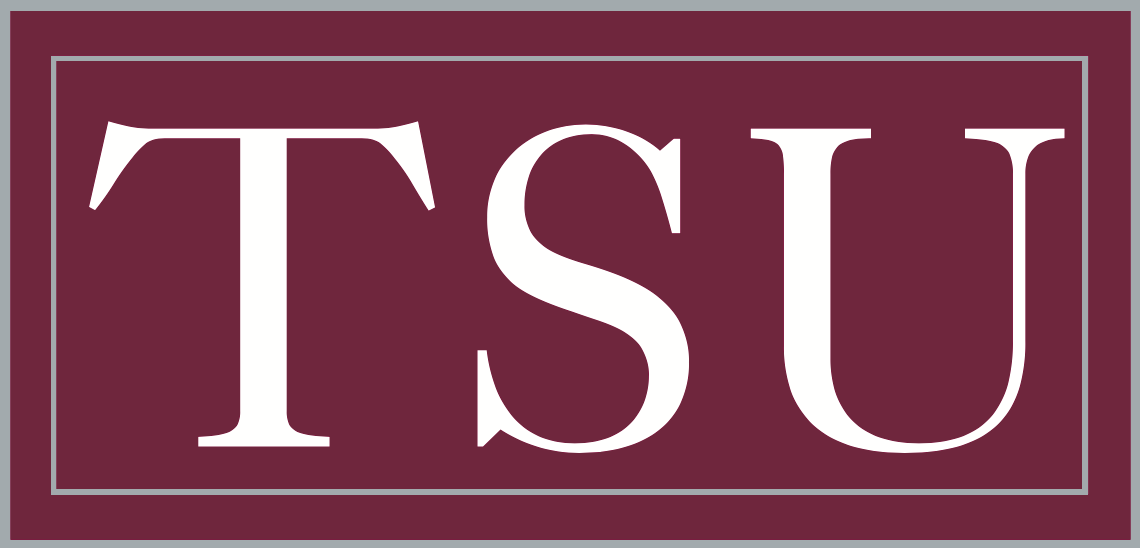

WNIT, First Round
- Conference: Southwestern Athletic Conference
- Record: 20–13 (15–3 SWAC)
- Head coach: Johnetta Hayes (1st season)
- Assistant coaches: Tony Greene; Jaye Nayreau; Twila Stokes
- Home arena: Health and Physical Education Arena

2013–14 SWAC women's basketball standings
	Conf.				Overall
Team	W		L	PCT	W		L	PCT
Southern	16	–	2	.889	20	–	8	.714
Texas Southern	15	–	3	.833	20	–	13	.606
Jackson State	12	–	6	.667	15	–	15	.500
Prairie View A&M†	11	–	7	.611	14	–	18	.438
Alabama State	9	–	9	.500	16	–	14	.533
Mississippi Valley State	8	–	10	.444	9	–	21	.300
Grambling State	7	–	11	.389	11	–	20	.355
Alcorn State	7	–	11	.389	8	–	22	.267
Alabama A&M	3	–	15	.167	6	–	24	.200
Arkansas-Pine Bluff	2	–	16	.111	3	–	26	.103
† 2014 SWAC tournament winner As of 10:03, 1 April 2014 (UTC); Rankings from AP poll

The 2013–14 Texas Southern Lady Tigers basketball team represented Texas Southern University during the 2013–14 NCAA Division I women's basketball season. The Tigers, led by first year head coach Johnetta Hayes, played their home games at the Health and Physical Education Arena and were members of the Southwestern Athletic Conference. The Tigers would make their first ever Tournament final and qualify for their second straight WNIT. The Tigers would finish the season 20–13.

== Roster ==
Number	Name	Position	Height	Year	Hometown
1	Brianna Sidney	Guard	5–9	Sophomore	Brooklyn, New York
2	Tashara Jones	Guard	5–8	Freshman	Pensacola, Florida
3	Dana Jones	Forward	6–1	RS Junior	Gulfport, Mississippi
4	Miracle Davis	Guard	5–9	Junior	Tulsa, Oklahoma
12	Morgan Simmons	Forward	6–1	Junior	La Marque, Texas
22	Sarah Williams	Guard	5–5	Junior	Roanoke, Virginia
24	Kiana Ingram	Guard	5–8	Freshman	Sugar Land, Texas
25	Jazzmin Parker	Guard	5–10	Junior	Houston, Texas
32	Ashley Ferguson	Forward	6–2	Freshman	Arlington, Texas
40	Crystal Anyiam	Center	6–3	Senior	Allen, Texas
44	Alexus Johnson	Forward	6–2	RS Freshman	Denver, Colorado

== Schedule ==
Date time, TV	Opponent	Result	Record	Site (attendance) city, state
Regular Season
11/08/2013*; 11:30 am	at Tulsa	W 88–80	1–0	Reynolds Center (1,171); Tulsa, OK
11/11/2013*; 7:00 pm	at Rice	L 54–61	1–1	Tudor Fieldhouse (484); Houston, TX
11/14/2013*; 7:00 pm	Houston Baptist	W 82–70	2–1	Health and Physical Education Arena (582); Houston, TX
11/19/2013*; 7:00 pm	McNeese State	W 71–55	3–1	Health and Physical Education Arena (521); Houston, TX
11/23/2013*; 2:00 pm	at Nicholls State	L 70–79	3–2	Stopher Gym (90); Thibodaux, LA
11/29/2012*; 5:30 pm	vs. No. 8 Maryland; San Juan Shootout	L 59–100	3–3	Mario Morales Coliseu (N/A); Guaynabo, Puerto Rico
11/30/2013*; 5:30 pm	vs. UIC; San Juan Shootout	L 66–70	3–4	Mario Morales Coliseu (N/A); Guaynabo, Puerto Rico
12/12/2013*; 7:00 pm, ESPN3	at Kansas	L 78–105	3–5	Allen Fieldhouse (1,725); Lawrence, KS
12/15/2013*; 1:00 pm, KSMO	at UMKC	L 79–80	3–6	Swinney Recreation Center (455); Kansas City, MO
12/19/2013*; 4:00 pm	Texas A&M–Corpus Christi	L 69–71	3–7	Health and Physical Education Arena (287); Houston, TX
12/29/2013*; 2:00 pm	at UTEP	L 61–87	3–8	Don Haskins Center (1,505); El Paso, TX
01/04/2014; 3:00 pm	Alcorn State	W 69–44	4–8 (1–0)	Health and Physical Education Arena (582); Houston, TX
01/06/2014; 5:00 pm	Southern	L 68–70	4–9 (1–1)	Health and Physical Education Arena (824); Houston, TX
01/11/2014; 5:30 pm	Prairie View A&M	W 63–59	5–9 (2–1)	Health and Physical Education Arena (4,524); Houston, TX
01/18/2014; 5:30 pm	at Grambling State	W 77–63	6–9 (3–1)	Fredrick C. Hobdy Assembly Center (1,513); Grambling, LA
01/20/2014; 5:30 pm	at Jackson State	W 73–48	7–9 (4–1)	Williams Assembly Center (219); Jackson, MS
01/25/2014; 3:00 pm	Mississippi Valley State	W 65–55	8–9 (5–1)	Health and Physical Education Arena (471); Houston, TX
01/27/2014; 5:00 pm	Arkansas–Pine Bluff	W 75–51	9–9 (6–1)	Health and Physical Education Arena (724); Houston, TX
02/01/2014; 4:00 pm	Alabama A&M	W 66–61	10–9 (7–1)	Elmore Gymnasium (1,456); Normal, AL
02/03/2014; 5:30 pm	at Alabama State	W 83–74	11–9 (8–1)	Dunn–Oliver Acadome (1,024); Montgomery, AL
02/08/2014; 5:00 pm	at Prairie View A&M	W 74–70	12–9 (9–1)	William Nicks Building (3,900); Prairie View, TX
02/15/2014; 3:00 pm	Grambling State	W 84–76	13–9 (10–1)	Health and Physical Education Arena (1,874); Houston, TX
02/17/2014; 5:30 pm	Jackson State	W 61–54	14–9 (11–1)	Health and Physical Education Arena (1,024); Houston, TX
02/22/2014; 3:00 pm	at Mississippi Valley State	W 66–56	15–9 (12–1)	Harrison HPER Complex (1,298); Itta Bena, MS
02/24/2014; 5:30 pm	at Arkansas–Pine Bluff	W 67–64	16–9 (13–1)	K. L. Johnson Complex (1,988); Pine Bluff, AR
03/01/2014; 3:00 pm	Alabama State	L 57–65	16–10 (13–2)	Health and Physical Education Arena (526); Houston, TX
03/03/2014; 5:30 pm	Alabama A&M	W 81–72	17–10 (14–2)	Health and Physical Education Arena (892); Houston, TX
03/06/2014; 5:30 pm	at Alcorn State	W 67–64	18–10 (15–2)	Davey Whitney Complex (573); Lorman, MS
03/08/2014; 3:00 pm	at Southern	L 66–71	18–11 (15–3)	F. G. Clark Center (1,043); Baton Rouge, LA
2014 SWAC women's basketball tournament
03/12/2014; 10:00 am	vs. Grambling State	W 82–74	19–11	Toyota Center (N/A); Houston, TX
03/14/2014; 12:00 pm	vs. Jackson State	W 79–77	20–11	Toyota Center (N/A); Houston, TX
03/15/2014; 12:00 pm, ESPN3	vs. Prairie View A&M	L 58–63	20–12	Toyota Center (N/A); Houston, TX
2014 Women's National Invitation Tournament
03/20/2014; 7:00 pm	at SMU	L 72–84	20–13	Moody Coliseum (369); University Park, TX
*Non-conference game. ^{#}Rankings from AP Poll. (#) Tournament seedings in parentheses. All times are in Central Time.

== See also ==
2013–14 Texas Southern Tigers basketball team
