= 2013–14 Stephen F. Austin Ladyjacks basketball team =

Intercollegiate basketball season

2013–14 Stephen F. Austin Ladyjacks basketball

Southland Conference regular season co-champions

2014 Women's Basketball Invitational, Runner-up
- Conference: Southland Conference
- Record: 23–13 (13–5 Southland)
- Head coach: Brandon Schneider (4th season)
- Assistant coaches: Andy Majors (4th season); Jodi Greve (4th season); Jamila Ganter (1st season)
- Home arena: William R. Johnson Coliseum

2013–14 Southland Conference women's basketball standings
	Conf.				Overall
Team	W		L	PCT	W		L	PCT
Lamar	13	–	5	.722	18	–	13	.581
Stephen F. Austin	13	–	5	.722	23	–	13	.639
Central Arkansas	12	–	6	.667	18	–	12	.600
Northwestern State†	11	–	7	.611	21	–	13	.618
Nicholls State	11	–	7	.611	17	–	14	.548
Texas A&M-CC	11	–	7	.611	18	–	12	.600
Abilene Christian*	8	–	6	.571	18	–	12	.600
McNeese State	10	–	8	.556	19	–	14	.576
Oral Roberts	8	–	10	.444	9	–	20	.310
Houston Baptist	8	–	10	.444	12	–	17	.414
Sam Houston State	8	–	10	.444	13	–	16	.448
Southeastern Louisiana	7	–	11	.389	8	–	22	.267
Incarnate Word*	2	–	12	.143	8	–	19	.296
New Orleans**	0	–	18	.000	0	–	29	.000
† 2014 Southland tournament winner As of March 22, 2014 *ineligible for postseason play due to Div. I transition **ineligible for postseason play due to APR penalties Rankings from AP poll

The 2013–14 Stephen F. Austin Ladyjacks basketball team represented Stephen F. Austin University during the 2013–14 NCAA Division I women's basketball season. The Ladyjacks were led by fourth year head coach Brandon Schneider and played their home games at the William R. Johnson Coliseum. They are members of the Southland Conference. The Ladyjacks were Southland Conference regular season co-champions with Lamar and were runner-up in the 2014 Southland Conference women's basketball tournament. They closed out post-season play as Runner-up in the 2014 Women's Basketball Invitational.

== Roster ==
Number	Name	Position	Height	Year	Hometown
0	Alexis Fatheree	Guard/Forward	5–9	Freshman	Richmond, Texas
1	Brittney Matthew	Guard	5–7	Junior	Houston, Texas
3	Kali Jerrell	Guard	5–5	Senior	Austin, Texas
5	Porsha Roberts	Center	6–2	Junior	Waco, Texas
10	Brentney Branch	Guard	5–6	Freshman	Webster, Texas
12	Taylor Ross	Guard	5–6	Freshman	Pflugerville, Texas
20	Antoinette Carter	Forward	6–0	Senior	Brentwood, Tennessee
21	Daylyn Harris	Forward	5–10	Junior	Livingston, Texas
23	Paulletta Powell	Guard	5–8	Sophomore	Port Arthur, Texas
24	Victoria Pena	Guard	5–7	Sophomore	Edinburg, Texas
31	Tierany Henderson	Forward	5–11	Junior	Austin, Texas
32	Destiny Bragman	Center	6–2	Junior	Albuquerque, New Mexico
34	LaNesha Middleton	Forward	5–10	Sophomore	Stillwater, Oklahoma
55	Adrienne Lewis	Center	6–1	Freshman	DeSoto, Texas

== Schedule ==
Date time, TV	Rank^{#}	Opponent^{#}	Result	Record	Site (attendance) city, state
Regular Season
11/08/2013*; 7:00 pm		at No. 15 LSU; Preseason WNIT	L 58–86	0–1	Pete Maravich Assembly Center (2,290); Baton Rouge, LA
11/15/2013*; 7:00 pm		Stetson; Preseason WNIT	L 77–84	0–2	William R. Johnson Coliseum (1,090); Nacogdoches, TX
11/16/2013*; 4:00 pm		Georgia State; Preseason WNIT	W 66–60	1–2	William R. Johnson Coliseum (N/A); Nacogdoches, TX
11/20/2013*; 7:00 pm		at Arizona	W 60–56	2–2	McKale Center (1,057); Tucson, AZ
11/23/2013*; 6:00 pm		SMU	L 69–81	2–3	William R. Johnson Coliseum (712); Nacogdoches, TX
11/30/2013*; 12:00 pm		vs. Prairie View A&M; David Jones Memorial Classic	W 76–70	3–3	Hofheinz Pavilion (522); Houston, TX
12/01/2013*; 1:00 pm		vs. Kent State; David Jones Memorial Classic	L 52–54	3–4	Hofheinz Pavilion (458); Houston, TX
12/04/2013*; 7:00 pm, FCS Central		at TCU	L 52–60	3–5	Daniel-Meyer Coliseum (1,954); Ft. Worth, TX
12/08/2013*; 2:00 pm		at Louisiana–Monroe	L 83–85	3–6	Fant–Ewing Coliseum (828); Monroe, LA
12/15/2013*; 2:00 pm		Grambling State	W 92–55	4–6	William R. Johnson Coliseum (376); Nacogdoches, TX
12/19/2013*; 7:00 pm		Henderson State	W 72–56	5–6	William R. Johnson Coliseum (356); Nacogdoches, TX
12/30/2013*; 6:00 pm		Texas A&M–Commerce	W 101–59	6–6	William R. Johnson Coliseum (432); Nacogdoches, TX
01/02/2014; 6:00 pm		Lamar	W 64–43	7–6 (1–0)	William R. Johnson Coliseum (528); Nacogdoches, TX
01/04/2014; 4:00 pm		Sam Houston State	W 89–59	8–6 (2–0)	William R. Johnson Coliseum (587); Nacogdoches, TX
01/09/2014; 5:00 pm, LSN		at Houston Baptist	W 71–60	9–6 (3–0)	Sharp Gymnasium (624); Houston, TX
01/11/2014; 4:00 pm		at Texas A&M–Corpus Christi	W 58–51	10–6 (4–0)	American Bank Center (N/A); Corpus Christi, TX
01/16/2014; 5:30 pm		at Northwestern State	L 54–66	11–7 (4–1)	Prather Coliseum (1,031); Natchitoches, LA
01/23/2014; 5:00 pm, ESPN3		at Oral Roberts	L 55–64	11–8 (4–2)	Mabee Center (670); Tulsa, OK
01/25/2014; 2:00 pm		at Central Arkansas	L 42–65	11–9 (4–3)	Farris Center (1,215); Conway, AR
01/30/2014; 6:00 pm		Abilene Christian	W 64–48	12–9 (5–3)	William R. Johnson Coliseum (2,836); Nacogdoches, TX
02/01/2014; 4:00 pm		Incarnate Word	W 79–59	13–9 (6–3)	William R. Johnson Coliseum (1,197); Nacogdoches, TX
02/06/2014; 6:00 pm		Nicholls State	L 74–75 ^{2OT}	13–10 (6–4)	William R. Johnson Coliseum (2,108); Nacogdoches, TX
02/08/2014; 4:00 pm		McNeese State	W 69–49	14–10 (7–4)	William R. Johnson Coliseum (2,028); Nacogdoches, TX
02/13/2014; 5:30 pm		at Lamar	L 73–75	14–11 (7–5)	Montagne Center (960); Beaumont, TX
02/15/2014; 1:30 pm, ESPN3		at Sam Houston State	W 58–52	15–11 (8–5)	Bernard Johnson Coliseum (856); Huntsville, TX
02/22/2014; 4:00 pm		Northwestern State	W 68–51	16–11 (9–5)	William R. Johnson Coliseum (3,671); Nacogdoches, TX
02/27/2014; 5:30 pm		at New Orleans	W 63–36	17–11 (10–5)	Lakefront Arena (524); New Orleans, LA
03/01/2014; 2:00 pm		at Southeastern Louisiana	W 92–79	18–11 (11–5)	University Center (312); Hammond, LA
03/06/2013; 6:00 pm		Oral Roberts	W 72–52	19–11 (12–5)	William R. Johnson Coliseum (2,720); Nacogdoches, TX
03/08/2014; 4:00 pm		Central Arkansas	W 61–41	20–11 (13–5)	William R. Johnson Coliseum (3,661); Nacogdoches, TX
2014 Southland Conference women's basketball tournament
03/15/2014; 2:30 pm, ESPN3	(2)	vs. (7) McNeese State; Semifinals	W 80–54	21–11	Leonard E. Merrill Center (1,183); Katy, TX
03/16/2014; 12:00 pm, CBSSN	(2)	vs. (4) Northwestern State; Championship Game	L 44–62	20–12	Leonard E. Merrell Center (806); Katy, TX
2014 Women's Basketball Invitational
03/20/2014; 7:00 pm	(4W)	(5W) Texas State; First Round	W 59–51	21–12	William R. Johnson Coliseum (559); Nacogdoches, TX
03/22/2014; 7:00 pm	(4W)	(8W) Boise State; Quarterfinals	W 80–59	22–12	William R. Johnson Coliseum (421); Nacogdoches, TX
03/27/2014; 7:00 pm	(4W)	(2W) College of Charleston; Semi-finals	W 78–74	23–12	TD Arena (609); Charleston, SC
03/29/2014; 3:00 pm	(4W)	(4E) UIC; Championship Game	L 64–73	23–13	UIC Pavilion (286); Chicago, IL
*Non-conference game. ^{#}Rankings from AP Poll. (#) Tournament seedings in parentheses. All times are in Central Time.

== See also ==
2013–14 Stephen F. Austin Lumberjacks basketball team
