= 2014 SWAC women's basketball tournament =

- Classification: Division I
- Season: 2013–14
- Teams: 10
- Site: Toyota Center; Houston, Texas
- Television: ESPN3

2013–14 SWAC women's basketball standings
	Conf.				Overall
Team	W		L	PCT	W		L	PCT
Southern	16	–	2	.889	20	–	8	.714
Texas Southern	15	–	3	.833	20	–	13	.606
Jackson State	12	–	6	.667	15	–	15	.500
Prairie View A&M†	11	–	7	.611	14	–	18	.438
Alabama State	9	–	9	.500	16	–	14	.533
Mississippi Valley State	8	–	10	.444	9	–	21	.300
Grambling State	7	–	11	.389	11	–	20	.355
Alcorn State	7	–	11	.389	8	–	22	.267
Alabama A&M	3	–	15	.167	6	–	24	.200
Arkansas-Pine Bluff	2	–	16	.111	3	–	26	.103
† 2014 SWAC tournament winner As of 10:03, 1 April 2014 (UTC); Rankings from AP poll

The 2014 SWAC women's basketball tournament took place March 11–15, 2014, at the Toyota Center in Houston, Texas. The tournament champion will receive the Southwestern Athletic Conference's automatic bid to the 2014 NCAA Women's Division I Basketball Championship.

== Format ==
All 10 teams were eligible and able to compete in the 2014 Women's Basketball Tournament, unlike the men's bracket where only 6 teams were eligible until the SWAC adjusted the league's postseason ban. Seeds 1-6 received a bye into the quarterfinals. Rather than use the traditional 10-team scheduling format, where one full day was devoted to men's quarterfinals and the other to the women's quarterfinals, the SWAC decided to protect their top 2-seeds by giving them days off between matches. The tournament began with two quarterfinals on Tuesday featuring 7/10 and 8/9. The winner of these two matches moved on to play the 1 (vs. 8/9) and 2 (vs. 7/10) seeds on Wednesday. The 3 vs. 6 and 4 vs. 5 matches did not take place until Thursday. The quarterfinal winners would meet in the semifinals on Friday, and the championship game took place Saturday. The championship game aired live on ESPN3 and then aired tape delayed on ESPNU Sunday.

== Seeds ==
2014 SWAC Women's Basketball Tournament seeds
Seed	School	Conference Record	Overall Record (End of Regular season)	Tiebreaker
1.	Southern	16-2	19-7	
2.	Texas Southern	15-3	18-11	
3.	Jackson State	12-6	14-14	
4.	Prairie View A&M	11-7	11-17	
5.	Alabama State	9-9	16-13	
6.	Mississippi Valley State	8-10	9-20	
7.	Alcorn State	7-11	8-21	1-1 vs. Southern
8.	Grambling State	7-11	10-19	0-2 vs. Southern
9.	Alabama A&M	3-15	5-23	
10.	Arkansas-Pine Bluff	2-16	3-25	

== Bracket ==
First round Tuesday, March 11
8	Alcorn State	62
9	Alabama A&M	64
7	Grambling State	83
10	Arkansas-Pine Bluff	81

Quarterfinals; Wednesday, March 12 & Thursday, March 13
1	Southern	80
9	Alabama A&M	66
4	Prairie View A&M	71
5	Alabama State	61
2	Texas Southern	82
7	Grambling State	74
3	Jackson State	74
6	Mississippi Valley State	68

Semifinals; Friday, March 14
1	Southern	43
4	Prairie View A&M	72
2	Texas Southern	79
3	Jackson State	77

Championship game Saturday, March 15; ESPN3
4	Prairie View A&M	63
2	Texas Southern	58

All times listed are Central
