= 2014 Southland Conference women's basketball tournament =

- Classification: Division I
- Season: 2013–14
- Teams: 8
- Site: Merrell Center; Katy, Texas
- Champions: Northwestern State
- MVP: Trudy Armstead (Northwestern State)
- Television: SLC Digital/ESPN3/CBSSN

2013–14 Southland Conference women's basketball standings
	Conf.				Overall
Team	W		L	PCT	W		L	PCT
Lamar	13	–	5	.722	18	–	13	.581
Stephen F. Austin	13	–	5	.722	23	–	13	.639
Central Arkansas	12	–	6	.667	18	–	12	.600
Northwestern State†	11	–	7	.611	21	–	13	.618
Nicholls State	11	–	7	.611	17	–	14	.548
Texas A&M-CC	11	–	7	.611	18	–	12	.600
Abilene Christian*	8	–	6	.571	18	–	12	.600
McNeese State	10	–	8	.556	19	–	14	.576
Oral Roberts	8	–	10	.444	9	–	20	.310
Houston Baptist	8	–	10	.444	12	–	17	.414
Sam Houston State	8	–	10	.444	13	–	16	.448
Southeastern Louisiana	7	–	11	.389	8	–	22	.267
Incarnate Word*	2	–	12	.143	8	–	19	.296
New Orleans**	0	–	18	.000	0	–	29	.000
† 2014 Southland tournament winner As of March 22, 2014 *ineligible for postseason play due to Div. I transition **ineligible for postseason play due to APR penalties Rankings from AP poll

The 2014 Southland Conference women's basketball tournament, a part of the 2013–14 NCAA Division I women's basketball season, took place March 13–16, 2014 at the Merrell Center in Katy, Texas. The winner of the tournament, the Northwestern State Lady Demons, received the Southland Conference's automatic bid to the 2014 NCAA tournament.

== Seeds & Regular Season Standings ==
Only the Top 8 teams advanced to the Southland Conference tournament. If a team ineligible for the NCAA Tourney finished in the top 8, their seed fell to the next eligible team. Abilene Christian and Incarnate Word were ineligible for post-season play as they were in the first year of a 4-year transition from Division II to Division I. They won't be eligible for the Southland tourney until 2018. New Orleans was ineligible due to low APR scores. This chart shows all the teams records and standings and explains why teams advanced to the conference tourney or finished in certain tiebreaking positions. This was the final season Oral Roberts was part of the Southland field. They returned to the Summit League for the 2014-15 athletic season.

2014 Southland Conference women's basketball tournament seeds
Seed	School	Conference Record	Overall Record (End of Regular Season)	Tiebreaker
1.	Lamar	13–5	18–11	1–0 vs. Central Arkansas
2.	Stephen F. Austin	13–5	19–11	1–1 vs. Central Arkansas
3.	Central Arkansas	12–6	18–11	
4.	Northwestern State	11–7	18–12	2–0 vs. Nich & A&M-CC
5.	Nicholls State	11–7	16–13	2–1 vs. NW St & A&M-CC
6.	Texas A&M-Corpus Christi	11–7	18–11	1–2 vs. NW St & Nich
7.	Abilene Christian	8–6	18–12	D1 transitioning, ineligible for NCAA Tourney
8.	McNeese State	10–8	17–12	
9.	Oral Roberts	8–10	9–19	2–1 vs. SHSU & HBU
10.	Houston Baptist	8–10	12–17	1–1 vs. ORU & SHSU
11.	Sam Houston State	8–10	13–16	1–2 vs. ORU & HBU
12.	Southeastern Louisiana	7–11	8–22	
13.	Incarnate Word	2–12	8–19	D1 transitioning, ineligible for NCAA Tourney
14.	New Orleans	0–18	0–29	Low APR, ineligible for NCAA Tourney

== Bracket ==
First round Thursday, March 13; SLC Digital
5	Nicholls State	77
8	Oral Roberts	66
6	Texas A&M-Corpus Christi	73
7	McNeese State	78

Quarterfinals; Friday, March 14; SLC Digital
4	Northwestern State	69
5	Nicholls State	65
3	Central Arkansas	62
7	McNeese State	66

Semifinals; Saturday, March 15; ESPN3
1	Lamar	60
4	Northwestern State	61
2	Stephen F. Austin	80
7	McNeese State	54

Championship Game; Sunday, March 16; CBSSN
4	Northwestern State	62
2	Stephen F. Austin	44

== See also ==
- 2014 Southland Conference men's basketball tournament
- Southland Conference women's basketball tournament
