= 2013–14 Nicholls State Colonels women's basketball team =

Intercollegiate basketball season

2013–14 Nicholls State Colonels women's basketball
- Conference: Southland Conference
- Record: 17–14 (11–7 Southland)
- Head coach: DoBee Plaisance (6th season)
- Assistant coaches: Justin Payne (3rd season); Mark Beason (2nd season)
- Home arena: Stopher Gym

2013–14 Southland Conference women's basketball standings
	Conf.				Overall
Team	W		L	PCT	W		L	PCT
Lamar	13	–	5	.722	18	–	13	.581
Stephen F. Austin	13	–	5	.722	23	–	13	.639
Central Arkansas	12	–	6	.667	18	–	12	.600
Northwestern State†	11	–	7	.611	21	–	13	.618
Nicholls State	11	–	7	.611	17	–	14	.548
Texas A&M-CC	11	–	7	.611	18	–	12	.600
Abilene Christian*	8	–	6	.571	18	–	12	.600
McNeese State	10	–	8	.556	19	–	14	.576
Oral Roberts	8	–	10	.444	9	–	20	.310
Houston Baptist	8	–	10	.444	12	–	17	.414
Sam Houston State	8	–	10	.444	13	–	16	.448
Southeastern Louisiana	7	–	11	.389	8	–	22	.267
Incarnate Word*	2	–	12	.143	8	–	19	.296
New Orleans**	0	–	18	.000	0	–	29	.000
† 2014 Southland tournament winner As of March 22, 2014 *ineligible for postseason play due to Div. I transition **ineligible for postseason play due to APR penalties Rankings from AP poll

The 2013–14 Nicholls State Colonels women's basketball team represented Nicholls State University during the 2013–14 NCAA Division I women's basketball season. The Colonels, led by third year head coach DoBee Plaisance, played their home games at Stopher Gym and are members of the Southland Conference.

== Roster ==
Number	Name	Position	Height	Year	Hometown
0	Emani White	Guard	5–4	Sophomore	New Orleans, Louisiana
1	Jovana Mandic	Center	6–4	Junior	Knin, Croatia
2	Shay Arnick	Center	6–2	Junior	Dallas, Texas
3	Elexus Allen	Forward	6–1	Freshman	San Antonio, Texas
5	Hope Pawlowski	Guard	5–7	Sophomore	Orlando, Florida
10	KK Babin	Guard	5–4	Senior	Gonzales, Louisiana
12	Jenny Nash	Guard	5–10	Junior	Houston, Texas
21	Syleida Ellis	Forward	5–9	Junior	Shreveport, Louisiana
23	Jasmine Scott	Forward	6–1	Senior	Baton Rouge, Louisiana
24	Taylor Morrison	Guard	5–8	Freshman	Baton Rouge, Louisiana
32	LiAnn McCarthy	Forward	5–11	Senior	New Orleans, Louisiana
33	Bianca Harvey	Guard	5–8	Sophomore	Donaldsonville, Louisiana
40	Marina Lilly	Center	6–3	Freshman	Dallas, Texas
55	JonMarie Guillory	Center	6–1	Junior	Lake Charles, Louisiana

== Schedule ==
Date time, TV	Rank^{#}	Opponent^{#}	Result	Record	Site (attendance) city, state
Regular Season
11/08/2013*; 1:00 pm		SUNO	W 91–58	1–0	Stopher Gym (452); Thibodaux, LA
11/14/2013*; 7:00 pm		at Baylor	L 58–111	1–1	Ferrell Center (6,333); Waco, TX
11/20/2013*; 6:00 pm		at South Alabama	W 68–60	2–1	Mitchell Center (513); Mobile, AL
11/23/2013*; 2:00 pm		Texas Southern	W 79–70	3–1	Stopher Gym (90); Thibodaux, LA
11/26/2013*; 9:00 pm		at Georgetown; Great Alaska Shootout	L 55–67	3–2	Sullivan Arena (3,724); Anchorage, AK
11/27/2013*; 5:30 pm		vs. UC Riverside; Great Alaska Shootout	L 64–74	3–3	Sullivan Arena (3,726); Anchorage, AK
12/02/2013*; 6:00 pm		at Louisiana Tech	W 80–78	4–3	Thomas Assembly Center (211); Ruston, LA
12/17/2013*; 11:00 am		at Texas A&M	L 39–73	4–4	Reed Arena (7,188); College Station, TX
12/20/2013*; 2:00 pm		vs. Bethune-Cookman; Hatters Classic	W 73–56	5–4	Edmunds Center (99); DeLand, FL
12/21/2013*; 12:00 pm		at Stetson; Hatters Classic	L 65–74	5–5	Edmunds Center (210); DeLand, FL
12/29/2013*; 2:00 pm		at Southern Miss	L 66–84	5–6	Reed Green Coliseum (960); Hattiesburg, MS
01/02/2014; 5:30 pm		New Orleans	W 89–40	6–6 (1–0)	Stopher Gym (359); Thibodaux, LA
01/04/2014; 1:00 pm		Southeastern Louisiana	W 84–55	7–6 (2–0)	Stopher Gym (228); Thibodaux, LA
01/09/2014; 5:30 pm		at Lamar	L 68–82	7–7 (2–1)	Montagne Center (752); Beaumont, TX
01/11/2014; 1:30 pm		at Sam Houston State	L 50–51	7–8 (2–2)	Bernard Johnson Coliseum (371); Huntsville, TX
01/16/2014; 5:30 pm		Houston Baptist	L 61–66	7–9 (2–3)	Stopher Gym (311); Thibodaux, LA
01/18/2014; 1:00 pm		Texas A&M–Corpus Christi	W 67–60	8–9 (3–3)	Stopher Gym (243); Thibodaux, LA
01/21/2014; 5:30 pm		at McNeese State	W 71–63	9–9 (4–3)	Sudduth Coliseum (723); Lake Charles, LA
01/30/2014; 5:30 pm, ESPN3		Oral Roberts	W 71–60	10–9 (5–3)	Stopher Gym (525); Thibodaux, LA
02/01/2014; 1:00 pm		Central Arkansas	W 69–60	11–9 (6–3)	Stopher Gym (343); Thibodaux, LA
02/06/2014; 6:00 pm		at Stephen F. Austin	W 75–74 ^{2OT}	12–9 (7–3)	William R. Johnson Coliseum (2,108); Nacogdoches, TX
02/08/2014; 1:00 pm		at Northwestern State	L 60–76	12–10 (7–4)	Prather Coliseum (1,164); Natchitoches, LA
02/13/2014; 5:30 pm		at New Orleans	W 63–45	13–10 (8–4)	Lakefront Arena (718); New Orleans, LA
02/15/2014; 2:00 pm		at Southeastern Louisiana	L 66–68	13–11 (8–5)	University Center (517); Hammond, LA
02/22/2014; 1:00 pm		McNeese State	W 76–66	14–11 (9–5)	Stopher Gym (421); Thibodaux, LA
02/27/2014; 2:00 pm		Abilene Christian	L 62–78	14–12 (9–6)	Stopher Gym (105); Thibodaux, LA
03/01/2014; 1:00 pm		Incarnate Word	W 76–64	15–12 (10–6)	Stopher Gym (305); Thibodaux, LA
03/06/2014; 5:00 pm		at Houston Baptist	W 73–69	16–12 (11–6)	Sharp Gymnasium (820); Houston, TX
03/08/2014; 12:00 pm		at Texas A&M–Corpus Christi	L 55–59	16–13 (11–7)	American Bank Center (1,236); Corpus Christi, TX
2014 Southland Conference women's basketball tournament
03/13/2014; 11:00 pm	(5)	vs. (8) Oral Roberts; First round	W 77–66	17–13	Leonard E. Merrill Center (N/A); Katy, TX
03/14/2014; 11:00 pm	(5)	vs. (4) Northwestern State; Quarterfinals	L 65–69	17–14	Leonard E. Merrill Center (N/A); Katy, TX
*Non-conference game. ^{#}Rankings from AP Poll. (#) Tournament seedings in parentheses. All times are in Central Time.

== See also ==
- 2013–14 Nicholls State Colonels men's basketball team
