= 2013–14 Sam Houston State Bearkats women's basketball team =

Intercollegiate basketball season

2013–14 Sam Houston State Bearkats women's basketball
- Conference: Southland Conference
- Record: 13–16 (8–10 Southland)
- Head coach: Brenda Welch-Nichols (8th season)
- Assistant coaches: Jamene Caldwell (8th season); Leslie Reinecker (5th season); Jaime Gonzales (1st season)
- Home arena: Bernard Johnson Coliseum

2013–14 Southland Conference women's basketball standings
	Conf.				Overall
Team	W		L	PCT	W		L	PCT
Lamar	13	–	5	.722	18	–	13	.581
Stephen F. Austin	13	–	5	.722	23	–	13	.639
Central Arkansas	12	–	6	.667	18	–	12	.600
Northwestern State†	11	–	7	.611	21	–	13	.618
Nicholls State	11	–	7	.611	17	–	14	.548
Texas A&M-CC	11	–	7	.611	18	–	12	.600
Abilene Christian*	8	–	6	.571	18	–	12	.600
McNeese State	10	–	8	.556	19	–	14	.576
Oral Roberts	8	–	10	.444	9	–	20	.310
Houston Baptist	8	–	10	.444	12	–	17	.414
Sam Houston State	8	–	10	.444	13	–	16	.448
Southeastern Louisiana	7	–	11	.389	8	–	22	.267
Incarnate Word*	2	–	12	.143	8	–	19	.296
New Orleans**	0	–	18	.000	0	–	29	.000
† 2014 Southland tournament winner As of March 22, 2014 *ineligible for postseason play due to Div. I transition **ineligible for postseason play due to APR penalties Rankings from AP poll

The 2013–14 Sam Houston State Bearkats women's basketball team represented Sam Houston State University during the 2013–14 NCAA Division I women's basketball season. The Bearkats, led by seventh year head coach Brenda Welch-Nichols, played their home games at the Bernard Johnson Coliseum and are members of the Southland Conference.

== Roster ==
Number	Name	Position	Height	Year	Hometown
1	Sally Clavelle	Guard	5–8	Junior	New Orleans, Louisiana
3	Jasmine Johnson	Guard	5–7	Senior	Missouri City, Texas
4	Jasmin Anderson	Guard	5–7	Sophomore	Shreveport, Louisiana
5	Morghen Day	Guard	5–6	Freshman	Rockwall, Texas
10	Jasmine Robinson	Forward	6–1	Junior	Fort Worth, Texas
11	Taylor Dorsey	Guard	5–6	Freshman	Fort Worth, Texas
12	Angela Beadle	Post	6–3	Junior	Austin, Texas
14	Clarke Davis	Forward	6–0	RS Senior	Mansfield, Texas
15	Summer Fife	Guard	5–11	Junior	Fort Worth, Texas
21	Jazmin Wiley	Guard	5–11	Junior	Fort Worth, Texas
23	Amanda Barnes	Guard	5–5	Sophomore	Arlington, Texas
24	Kristina Smith	Guard	5–6	Freshman	Mesquite, Texas
32	Maggie Lorenz	Forward	6–3	Junior	Harvey, North Dakota
33	Nyha Carter	Forward	5–10	Senior	League City, Texas

== Schedule ==
Date time, TV	Opponent	Result	Record	Site (attendance) city, state
Exhibition
11/02/2013*; 6:00 pm, BSN	Mary Hardin–Baylor	W 99–44	–	Bernard Johnson Coliseum (N/A); Huntsville, TX
Regular Season
11/08/2013*; 11:00 am, Razor Vision	at Arkansas	L 45–81	0–1	Bud Walton Arena (4,122); Fayetteville, AR
11/10/2013*; 2:00 pm, Trojan Tracker	at Arkansas–Little Rock	L 65–69	0–2	Jack Stephens Center (1,286); Little Rock, AR
11/15/2013*; 11:30 am, BSN	Louisiana–Lafayette	W 83–73	1–2	Bernard Johnson Coliseum (756); Huntsville, TX
11/19/2013*; 5:30 pm, BSN	Houston Baptist	W 85–68	2–2	Bernard Johnson Coliseum (648); Huntsville, TX
11/22/2013*; 11:00 am, BSN	Texas A&M–Commerce	W 85–64	3–2	Bernard Johnson Coliseum (2,457); Huntsville, TX
11/26/2013*; 7:00 pm	at Rice	W 79–74 ^{OT}	4–2	Tudor Fieldhouse (427); Houston, TX
11/29/2013*; 1:00 pm	at UMKC; Plaza Lights Classic	W 78–76	5–2	Swinney Recreation Center (257); Kansas City, MO
11/30/2013*; 1:00 pm	vs. UAB; Plaza Lights Classic	L 59–70	5–3	Swinney Recreation Center (134); Kansas City, MO
12/05/2013*; 6:30 pm, BSN	Wichita State	L 47–64	5–4	Bernard Johnson Coliseum (646); Huntsville, TX
12/15/2013*; 2:00 pm, LONG	at Texas	L 48–109	5–5	Frank Erwin Center (2,838); Austin, TX
12/20/2013*; 5:00 pm	at TCU	L 46–78	5–6	Daniel-Meyer Coliseum (1,789); Ft. Worth, TX
01/02/2014; 5:30 pm	at Northwestern State	L 59–78	5–7 (0–1)	Prather Coliseum (903); Natchitoches, LA
01/04/2014; 4:00 pm, Lumberjack TV	at Stephen F. Austin	L 59–89	5–8 (0–2)	William R. Johnson Coliseum (587); Nacogdoches, TX
01/09/2014; 5:30 pm, BSN	McNeese State	L 55–59	5–9 (0–3)	Bernard Johnson Coliseum (345); Huntsville, TX
01/11/2014; 1:30 pm, BSN	Nicholls State	W 51–50	6–9 (1–3)	Bernard Johnson Coliseum (371); Huntsville, TX
01/16/2014; 5:00 pm	at Southeastern Louisiana	W 86–85 ^{OT}	7–9 (2–3)	University Center (268); Hammond, LA
01/18/2014; 4:00 pm	at New Orleans	W 78–47	8–9 (3–3)	Lakefront Arena (458); New Orleans, LA
01/23/2014; 5:30 pm	at Incarnate Word	W 60–51	9–9 (4–3)	McDermott Convocation Center (332); San Antonio, TX
01/25/2014; 1:00 pm, ESPN3	at Abilene Christian	L 67–73	9–10 (4–4)	Moody Coliseum (1,250); Abilene, TX
01/30/2014; 5:30 pm, BSN	Texas A&M–Corpus Christi	W 79–76	10–10 (5–4)	Bernard Johnson Coliseum (1,531); Huntsville, TX
02/01/2014; 1:30 pm, BSN	Houston Baptist	L 62–63	10–11 (5–5)	Bernard Johnson Coliseum (843); Huntsville, TX
02/08/2014; 1:30 pm, BSN	Lamar	L 45–70	10–12 (5–6)	Bernard Johnson Coliseum (586); Huntsville, TX
02/13/2014; 5:30 pm, BSN	Northwestern State	W 57–53	11–12 (6–6)	Bernard Johnson Coliseum (456); Huntsville, TX
02/15/2014; 1:30 pm, ESPN3	Stephen F. Austin	L 52–58	11–13 (6–7)	Bernard Johnson Coliseum (856); Huntsville, TX
02/22/2014; 4:00 pm	at Lamar	L 64–81	11–14 (6–8)	Montagne Center (819); Beaumont, TX
02/27/2014; 5:30 pm	at Central Arkansas	L 49–54	11–15 (6–9)	Farris Center (2,154); Conway, AR
03/02/2014; 1:00 pm	at Oral Roberts	L 50–80	11–16 (6–10)	Mabee Center (502); Tulsa, OK
03/06/2014; 5:30 pm, BSN	Southeastern Louisiana	W 93–73	12–16 (7–10)	Bernard Johnson Coliseum (456); Huntsville, TX
03/08/2014; 1:30 pm, BSN	New Orleans	W 87–56	13–16 (8–10)	Bernard Johnson Coliseum (456); Huntsville, TX
*Non-conference game. ^{#}Rankings from AP Poll. (#) Tournament seedings in parentheses. All times are in Central Time.

== See also ==
2013–14 Sam Houston State Bearkats men's basketball team
