= 2013–14 Texas A&M–Corpus Christi Islanders women's basketball team =

Intercollegiate basketball season

2013–14 Texas A&M–Corpus Christi Islanders women's basketball
- Conference: Southland Conference
- Record: 18–12 (11–7 Southland)
- Head coach: Royce Chadwick (2nd season)
- Assistant coaches: Roxanne White (2nd season); Darren Brunson (2nd season); Geoff Grawn (12th season)
- Home arena: American Bank Center; Dugan Wellness Center

2013–14 Southland Conference women's basketball standings
	Conf.				Overall
Team	W		L	PCT	W		L	PCT
Lamar	13	–	5	.722	18	–	13	.581
Stephen F. Austin	13	–	5	.722	23	–	13	.639
Central Arkansas	12	–	6	.667	18	–	12	.600
Northwestern State†	11	–	7	.611	21	–	13	.618
Nicholls State	11	–	7	.611	17	–	14	.548
Texas A&M-CC	11	–	7	.611	18	–	12	.600
Abilene Christian*	8	–	6	.571	18	–	12	.600
McNeese State	10	–	8	.556	19	–	14	.576
Oral Roberts	8	–	10	.444	9	–	20	.310
Houston Baptist	8	–	10	.444	12	–	17	.414
Sam Houston State	8	–	10	.444	13	–	16	.448
Southeastern Louisiana	7	–	11	.389	8	–	22	.267
Incarnate Word*	2	–	12	.143	8	–	19	.296
New Orleans**	0	–	18	.000	0	–	29	.000
† 2014 Southland tournament winner As of March 22, 2014 *ineligible for postseason play due to Div. I transition **ineligible for postseason play due to APR penalties Rankings from AP poll

The 2013–14 Texas A&M–Corpus Christi Islanders women's basketball team represented Texas A&M University–Corpus Christi in the 2013–14 NCAA Division I women's basketball season. This was head coach Royce Chadwick's second season at Texas A&M–Corpus Christi. The Islanders are members of the Southland Conference and played their home games at the American Bank Center and the Dugan Wellness Center.

== Media ==
Video streaming of all non-televised home games and audio for all road games was available at GoIslanders.com.

== Roster ==
Number	Name	Position	Height	Year	Hometown
1	Jasmine Shaw	Guard	5–7	Senior	Cincinnati, Ohio
2	Shola Adebayo	Guard	5–8	Junior	Oklahoma City, Oklahoma
3	Ashley Darley	Guard	5–6	Senior	Corpus Christi, Texas
4	Camesha Davis	Forward/Guard	6–1	Freshman	DeSoto, Texas
5	Alissa Campanero	Guard	5–4	Junior	San Diego, California
10	Shay Weaver	Guard	5–8	Junior	Arlington, Texas
11	Kassie Jones	Guard	5–7	Freshman	Lufkin, Texas
15	Brittany Mbamalu	Guard	5–8	Freshman	Houston, Texas
21	Lexy Harris	Forward	6–1	Junior	Houston, Texas
22	Ashanti Plummer	Forward	6–2	Sophomore	Manhattan, New York
23	Brandi Huff	Forward	6–0	Senior	Rockport, Texas
24	Daoshi Davis	Forward	6–1	Freshman	Port Arthur, Texas
25	Rua Jua' Terry	Guard	5–7	Freshman	Louisville, Kentucky
33	Taryn Gregory	Guard	5–6	Senior	Channelview, Texas

== Schedule and results ==
Date time, TV	Rank^{#}	Opponent^{#}	Result	Record	Site (attendance) city, state
Exhibition
11/03/2013*; 4:00 pm		Texas A&M International	W 76–50	–	Dugan Wellness Center (N/A); Corpus Christi, TX
Regular Season
11/08/2013*; 4:30 pm		Western Illinois; Emerald Beach Islanders Classic	W 66–60 ^{OT}	1–0	Dugan Wellness Center (540); Corpus Christi, TX
11/09/2013*; 4:30 pm		Fairfield; Emerald Beach Islanders Classic	L 55–58	1–1	Dugan Wellness Center (402); Corpus Christi, TX
11/14/2013*; 7:00 pm		Southern Utah	L 67–74	1–2	Dugan Wellness Center (N/A); Corpus Christi, TX
11/19/2013*; 6:00 pm		at Belmont	W 72–62	2–2	Curb Event Center (557); Nashville, TN
11/21/2013*; 6:00 pm		at Tennessee State	W 76–74	3–2	Gentry Complex (518); Nashville, TN
11/27/2013*; 7:00 pm		at Texas State	W 68–60	4–2	Strahan Coliseum (929); San Marcos, TX
12/05/2013*; 7:00 pm		UTSA	L 50–55 ^{OT}	4–3	American Bank Center (880); Corpus Christi, TX
12/08/2013*; 2:00 pm		Texas-Pan American	W 68–54	5–3	American Bank Center (1,348); Corpus Christi, TX
12/19/2013*; 4:00 pm		at Texas Southern	W 71–69	6–3	H&PE Arena (287); Houston, TX
12/21/2013*; 2:00 pm		at UT Arlington	L 64–75	6–4	College Park Center (1,137); Arlington, TX
12/30/2013*; 7:00 pm		Huston–Tillotson	W 84–64	7–4	American Bank Center (901); Corpus Christi, TX
01/02/2014; 5:30 pm		at Central Arkansas	L 62–66	7–5 (0–1)	Farris Center (622); Conway, AR
01/04/2014; 3:00 pm		at Oral Roberts	W 58–53	8–5 (1–1)	Mabee Center (1,127); Tulsa, OK
01/09/2014; 5:00 pm		Northwestern State	L 59–65	8–6 (1–2)	American Bank Center (1,220); Corpus Christi, TX
01/11/2014; 4:00 pm		Stephen F. Austin	L 51–58	8–7 (1–3)	American Bank Center (1,295); Corpus Christi, TX
01/16/2014; 5:30 pm		at McNeese State	L 51–79	8–8 (1–4)	Burton Coliseum (537); Lake Charles, LA
01/18/2014; 12:00 pm		at Nicholls State	L 60–67	8–9 (1–5)	Stopher Gym (243); Thibodaux, LA
01/23/2014; 5:00 pm		Southeastern Louisiana	W 83–54	9–9 (2–5)	Dugan Wellness Center (1,194); Corpus Christi, TX
01/25/2014; 4:00 pm		New Orleans	W 97–44	10–9 (3–5)	American Bank Center (1,810); Corpus Christi, TX
01/30/2014; 5:30 pm		at Sam Houston State	L 74–78	10–10 (3–6)	Bernard Johnson Coliseum (1,531); Huntsville, TX
02/01/2014; 4:00 pm, ESPN3		at Lamar	L 82–87	10–11 (3–7)	Montagne Center (808); Beaumont, TX
02/06/2014; 5:30 pm		at Incarnate Word	W 60–56	11–11 (4–7)	McDermott Convocation Center (316); San Antonio, TX
02/08/2014; 1:00 pm		at Abilene Christian	W 74–71	12–11 (5–7)	Moody Coliseum (1,025); Abilene, TX
02/13/2014; 5:00 pm		Central Arkansas	W 45–42	13–11 (6–7)	American Bank Center (1,721); Corpus Christi, TX
02/15/2014; 1:00 pm		Oral Roberts	W 61–53	14–11 (7–7)	American Bank Center (1,255); Corpus Christi, TX
02/22/2014; 5:00 pm		at Houston Baptist	W 74–62	15–11 (8–7)	Sharp Gymnasium (303); Houston, TX
03/01/2014; 12:00 pm		Houston Baptist	W 90–65	16–11 (9–7)	American Bank Center (1,002); Corpus Christi, TX
03/06/2014; 5:00 pm		McNeese State	W 74–69	17–11 (10–7)	American Bank Center (819); Corpus Christi, TX
03/08/2014; 12:00 pm		Nicholls State	W 59–55	18–11 (11–7)	American Bank Center (1,236); Corpus Christi, TX
Southland Conference tournament
03/13/2014; 1:30 pm	(6)	vs. (7) McNeese State; First Round	L 73–78	18–12	Leonard E. Merrill Center (819); Katy, TX
*Non-conference game. ^{#}Rankings from AP Poll. (#) Tournament seedings in parentheses. All times are in Central Time.

== See also ==
- 2013–14 Texas A&M–Corpus Christi Islanders men's basketball team
