= 2013–14 Prairie View A&M Lady Panthers basketball team =

American college basketball season

2013–14 Prairie View A&M Lady Panthers basketball
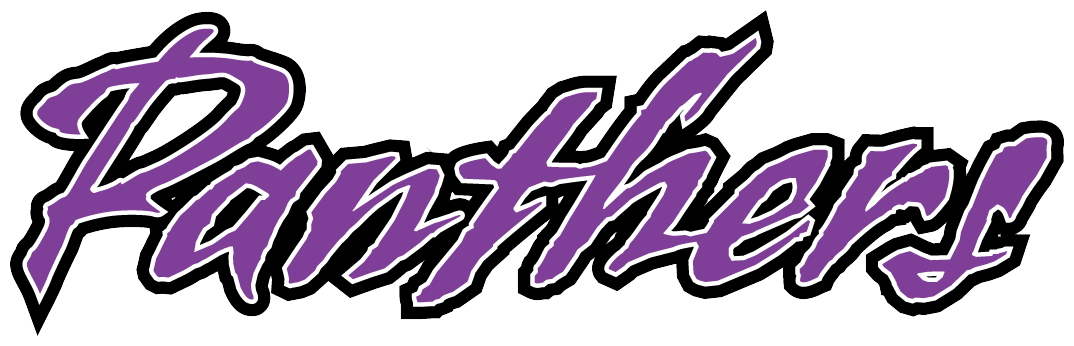

2014 SWAC Tournament Champions

NCAA Women's Tournament, first round
- Conference: Southwestern Athletic Conference
- Record: 14–18 (11–7 SWAC)
- Head coach: Dawn Brown (1st (Interim) season)
- Assistant coaches: India Elliott (2nd season); Tron Griffin (2nd season); Damon Moore (1st season)
- Home arena: William Nicks Building

2013–14 SWAC women's basketball standings
	Conf.				Overall
Team	W		L	PCT	W		L	PCT
Southern	16	–	2	.889	20	–	8	.714
Texas Southern	15	–	3	.833	20	–	13	.606
Jackson State	12	–	6	.667	15	–	15	.500
Prairie View A&M†	11	–	7	.611	14	–	18	.438
Alabama State	9	–	9	.500	16	–	14	.533
Mississippi Valley State	8	–	10	.444	9	–	21	.300
Grambling State	7	–	11	.389	11	–	20	.355
Alcorn State	7	–	11	.389	8	–	22	.267
Alabama A&M	3	–	15	.167	6	–	24	.200
Arkansas-Pine Bluff	2	–	16	.111	3	–	26	.103
† 2014 SWAC tournament winner As of 10:03, 1 April 2014 (UTC); Rankings from AP poll

The 2013–14 Prairie View A&M Lady Panthers basketball team represented Prairie View A&M University during the 2013–14 NCAA Division I women's basketball season. The Panthers, led by first year interim head coach Dawn Brown, played their home games at the William Nicks Building and were members of the Southwestern Athletic Conference. They finished the season with a record of 14–18 overall, 11–7 in SWAC play. They won the 2014 SWAC women's basketball tournament. They earned an automatic bid to the 2014 NCAA Division I women's basketball tournament, where they lost in the first round to Connecticut.

== Roster ==
Number	Name	Position	Height	Year	Hometown
0	LaReahn Washington	Guard	5–8	Senior	Houston, Texas
1	Jeanette Jackson	Guard	5–7	Junior	Las Vegas, Nevada
2	Shamiya Brooks	Center	6–4	Sophomore	West Point, Georgia
3	Alexus Parker	Guard	5–10	Freshman	Savannah, Georgia
5	Shaneece Stephens	Guard	5–9	Junior	Port St. Lucie, Florida
10	Precious Roberts	Guard	5–9	Junior	Fernandina Beach, Florida
11	Gabrielle Scott	Guard	5–7	RS Sophomore	Vancleave, Mississippi
12	Michaela Burton	Guard	5–9	Senior	Houston, Texas
13	Taylor Overshown	Guard	5–10	Sophomore	Houston, Texas
20	Cameron Vaughn	Forward	5–10	Junior	Xenia, Ohio
22	Larissa Scott	Forward	6–0	Junior	Cypress, Texas
33	Tonisha Lacey	Center	6–3	Senior	Oakland, California
44	Asha Hampton-Finch	Forward	6–3	Junior	San Antonio, Texas

== Schedule ==
Date time, TV	Rank^{#}	Opponent^{#}	Result	Record	Site (attendance) city, state
Regular Season
11/08/2013*; 7:00 pm		Rice	L 63–77	0–1	William Nicks Building (1,786); Prairie View, TX
11/13/2013*; 7:00 pm		at No. 16 Texas A&M	L 27–76	0–2	Reed Arena (4,053); College Station, TX
11/17/2013*; 6:00 pm		at Florida State	L 37–88	0–3	Donald L. Tucker Center (1,848); Tallahassee, FL
11/30/2013*; 12:00 pm		vs. Stephen F. Austin; David Jones Memorial Classic	L 70–76	0–4	Hofheinz Pavilion (522); Houston, TX
12/01/2013*; 3:30 pm		at Houston; David Jones Memorial Classic	L 46–74	0–5	Hofheinz Pavilion (621); Houston, TX
12/06/2013*; 7:00 pm		at FIU	L 52–77	0–6	U.S. Century Bank Arena (453); Miami, FL
12/14/2013*; 2:00 pm, ESPN3		vs. James Madison; St. John's Chartwells Holiday Classic	L 50–79	0–7	Carnesecca Arena (1,011); Queens, NY
12/15/2013*; 12:00 pm, ESPN3		vs. Drexel; St. John's Chartwells Holiday Classic	L 45–53	0–8	Carnesecca Arena (N/A); Queens, NY
12/18/2013*; 12:00 pm		at Central Michigan	L 66–90	0–9	McGuirk Arena (3,793); Mount Pleasant, MI
12/28/2013*; 7:00 pm		at TCU	L 47–76	0–10	Daniel-Meyer Coliseum (1,859); Ft. Worth, TX
01/04/2014; 3:00 pm		Southern	L 74–88	0–11 (0–1)	William Nicks Building (347); Prairie View, TX
01/06/2014; 5:30 pm		Alcorn State	W 71–68	1–11 (1–1)	William Nicks Building (337); Prairie View, TX
01/11/2014; 5:30 pm		at Texas Southern	L 59–63	1–12 (1–2)	Health and Physical Education Arena (4,524); Houston, TX
01/18/2014; 3:00 pm		at Jackson State	L 82–83	1–13 (1–3)	Williams Assembly Center (314); Jackson, MS
01/20/2014; 5:30 pm		at Grambling State	W 72–61	2–13 (2–3)	Fredrick C. Hobdy Assembly Center (1,347); Grambling, LA
01/25/2014; 3:00 pm		Arkansas–Pine Bluff	W 75–62	3–13 (3–3)	William Nicks Building (829); Prairie View, TX
01/27/2014; 5:30 pm		Mississippi Valley State	W 77–59	4–13 (4–3)	William Nicks Building (1,139); Prairie View, TX
02/01/2014; 3:00 pm		at Alabama State	W 58–47	5–13 (5–3)	Dunn–Oliver Acadome (523); Montgomery, AL
02/03/2013; 5:00 pm		at Alabama A&M	W 68–60	6–13 (6–3)	Elmore Gymnasium (821); Normal, AL
02/08/2014; 5:00 pm		Texas Southern	L 70–74	6–14 (6–4)	William Nicks Building (3,900); Prairie View, TX
02/15/2014; 3:00 pm		Jackson State	W 92–76	7–14 (7–4)	William Nicks Building (606); Prairie View, TX
02/17/2014; 5:30 pm		Grambling State	W 82–75	8–14 (8–4)	William Nicks Building (1,557); Prairie View, TX
02/22/2014; 3:00 pm		at Mississippi Valley State	W 80–67	9–14 (9–4)	Harrison HPER Complex (2,440); Itta Bena, MS
02/24/2014; 5:30 pm		at Arkansas–Pine Bluff	W 73–70	10–14 (10–4)	K. L. Johnson Complex (344); Pine Bluff, AR
03/01/2014; 3:00 pm		Alabama A&M	W 98–77	11–14 (11–4)	William Nicks Building (1,043); Prairie View, TX
03/03/2014; 5:30 pm		Alabama State	L 78–81	11–15 (11–5)	William Nicks Building (1,049); Prairie View, TX
03/06/2014; 5:30 pm		at Southern	L 56–69	11–16 (11–6)	F. G. Clark Center (547); Baton Rouge, LA
03/08/2014; 3:00 pm		at Alcorn State	L 48–55	11–17 (11–7)	Davey Whitney Complex (N/A); Lorman, MS
2014 SWAC Basketball Tournament
03/13/2014; 5:30 pm		vs. Alabama State; Quarterfinals	W 71–61	12–17	Toyota Center (N/A); Houston, TX
03/14/2014; 6:00 pm		vs. Southern; Semifinals	W 72–43	13–17	Toyota Center (N/A); Houston, TX
03/15/2014; 12:00 pm, ESPN3		vs. Texas Southern; Championship	W 63–58	14–17	Toyota Center (N/A); Houston, TX
2014 NCAA tournament
03/23/2014*; 7:05 pm, ESPN		at No. 1 Connecticut; First Round	L 44–87	14–18	Gampel Pavilion (5,018); Storrs, CT
*Non-conference game. ^{#}Rankings from AP Poll. (#) Tournament seedings in parentheses. All times are in Central Time.

== See also ==
2013–14 Prairie View A&M Panthers basketball team
