= 2013–14 Lamar Lady Cardinals basketball team =

Intercollegiate basketball season

2013–14 Lamar Lady Cardinals basketball

Southland Conference regular season co-champions

WNIT First Round vs. Southern Mississippi, L 60–75
- Conference: Southland Conference
- Record: 18–13 (13–5 Southland)
- Head coach: Robin Harmony (1st season)
- Assistant coaches: Randy Schneider (1st season); Candace Walker (1st season)
- Home arena: Montagne Center (Capacity: 10,080)

2013–14 Southland Conference women's basketball standings
	Conf.				Overall
Team	W		L	PCT	W		L	PCT
Lamar	13	–	5	.722	18	–	13	.581
Stephen F. Austin	13	–	5	.722	23	–	13	.639
Central Arkansas	12	–	6	.667	18	–	12	.600
Northwestern State†	11	–	7	.611	21	–	13	.618
Nicholls State	11	–	7	.611	17	–	14	.548
Texas A&M-CC	11	–	7	.611	18	–	12	.600
Abilene Christian*	8	–	6	.571	18	–	12	.600
McNeese State	10	–	8	.556	19	–	14	.576
Oral Roberts	8	–	10	.444	9	–	20	.310
Houston Baptist	8	–	10	.444	12	–	17	.414
Sam Houston State	8	–	10	.444	13	–	16	.448
Southeastern Louisiana	7	–	11	.389	8	–	22	.267
Incarnate Word*	2	–	12	.143	8	–	19	.296
New Orleans**	0	–	18	.000	0	–	29	.000
† 2014 Southland tournament winner As of March 22, 2014 *ineligible for postseason play due to Div. I transition **ineligible for postseason play due to APR penalties Rankings from AP poll

The 2013–14 Lamar Lady Cardinals basketball team represented Lamar University during the 2013–14 NCAA Division I women's basketball season. The Lady Cardinals, led by first year head coach Robin Harmony, played their home games at the Montagne Center and are members of the Southland Conference. The Lady Cardinals finished the season tied for the Southland Conference regular season championship with Stephen F. Austin. The Lady Cardinals were the Number One seed in the conference tournament because of the conference tie-breaker. After falling to Northwestern Louisiana in the Conference tournament final game, the Lady Cardinals received and invitation to the WNIT. The Lady Cardinals played the Southern Mississippi Golden Eagles in Hattiesburg, MS.

Gia Ayers and Dominique Edwards were named to Southland Conference All-Conference teams. Ayers was named to the First team. Edwards was named as a member of the Second Team.

Two Lady Cardinal basketball players were named to the Southland Conference All-Academic team. Dominique Edwards was named to the First Team while JaMeisha Edwards was named to the conference Second Team.

== Roster ==
Number	Name	Position	Height	Year	Hometown
1	Gia Ayers	Guard	5–7	Senior	Bryan, Texas
3	Chantelle Brockett	Center	6–1	Junior	Geelong, Victoria, Australia
4	Joann Lira	Guard	5–4	Freshman	Houston, Texas
10	Bethany Cox	Forward	5–11	Freshman	Glenpool, Oklahoma
15	Caroline Adesulu	Forward	6–1	Junior	Arlington, Texas
20	JaMeisha Edwards	Guard	5–5	Sophomore	Crockett, Texas
21	Kensha'dra Smith	Guard	5–7	Freshman	West Palm Beach, Florida
22	Francesca Bellatin	Guard/Forward	6–0	Senior	Lima, Peru
23	Micarah Malone	Forward	5–10	Freshman	Houston, Texas
24	Alice Robinson	Forward	5–10	Senior	Bossier City, Louisiana
25	Dominique Edwards	Forward	5–11	Junior	Grand Prairie, Texas
32	Shauna Long	Guard	5–4	Junior	Fort Yates, North Dakota
33	Kiandra Bowers	Post	5–11	Freshman	West Palm Beach, Florida

== Schedule ==
Date time, TV	Opponent	Result	Record	Site (attendance) city, state
Regular Season
11/08/2013*; 11:00 am	at Oklahoma State	L 56–83	0–1	Gallagher-Iba Arena (2,923); Stillwater, OK
11/11/2013*; 7:00 pm	Our Lady of the Lake	W 94–60	1–0	Montagne Center (332); Beaumont, TX
11/14/2013*; 7:00 pm	at UTSA	W 63–59	2–1	Convocation Center (524); San Antonio, TX
11/17/2013*; 2:00 pm	Tulsa	L 67–68	2–2	Montagne Center (683); Beaumont, TX
11/20/2013*; 7:00 pm	at Louisiana–Lafayette	W 68–60	3–2	Cajundome (364); Lafayette, LA
11/25/2013*; 6:00 pm	at SMU	L 79–82	3–3	Curtis Culwell Center (345); Garland, TX
11/29/2013*; 2:00 pm	vs. Milwaukee; Aggie Hotel Encanto Thanksgiving Classic	W 75–63	4–3	Pan American Center (350); Las Cruces, NM
11/30/2013*; 12:00 pm	Northern Illinois; Aggie Hotel Encanto Thanksgiving Classic	L 52–79	4–4	Pan American Center (N/A); Las Cruces, NM
12/15/2013*; 12:05 pm	Missouri State	L 60–87	4–5	JQH Arena (2,624); Springfield, MO
12/18/2013*; 6:00 pm	Texas State	W 68–55	5–5	Montagne Center (738); Beaumont, TX
12/29/2013*; 2:00 pm	Rice	L 64–67	5–6	Montagne Center (608); Beaumont, TX
01/02/2014; 6:00 pm	at Stephen F. Austin	L 43–64	5–7 (0–1)	William R. Johnson Coliseum (528); Nacogdoches, TX
01/04/2014; 1:00 pm	at Northwestern State	W 84–79	6–7 (1–1)	Prather Coliseum (731); Natchitoches, LA
01/09/2014; 5:30 pm	Nicholls State	W 82–68	7–7 (2–1)	Montagne Center (752); Beaumont, TX
01/11/2014; 4:00 pm	McNeese State; Battle of the Border	W 72–58	8–7 (3–1)	Montagne Center (872); Beaumont, TX
01/16/2014; 5:30 pm, ESPN3	at New Orleans	W 80–53	9–7 (4–1)	Lakefront Arena (438); New Orleans, LA
01/18/2014; 2:00 pm	at Southeastern Louisiana	L 62–67	9–8 (4–2)	University Center (467); Hammond, LA
01/23/2014; 5:30 pm	at Abilene Christian	W 85–83	10–8 (5–2)	Moody Coliseum (623); Abilene, TX
01/25/2013; 2:00 pm	at Incarnate Word	W 76–69	11–8 (6–2)	McDermott Convocation Center (375); San Antonio, TX
01/30/2014; 5:30 pm	Houston Baptist	L 66–76	11–9 (6–3)	Montagne Center (891); Beaumont, TX
02/01/2014; 4:00 pm, ESPN3	Texas A&M-Corpus Christi	W 87–72	12–9 (7–3)	Montagne Center (808); Beaumont, TX
02/08/2014; 2:00 pm	at Sam Houston State	W 70–45	13–9 (8–3)	Bernard Johnson Coliseum (586); Huntsville, TX
02/13/2014; 5:30 pm	Stephen F. Austin	W 75–73	14–9 (9–3)	Montagne Center (960); Beaumont, TX
02/15/2014; 4:00 pm	Northwestern State	L 60–67	14–10 (9–4)	Montagne Center (759); Beaumont, TX
02/22/2014; 4:00 pm	Sam Houston State	W 81–64	15–10 (10–4)	Montagne Center (819); Beaumont, TX
02/27/2014; 5:00 pm	at Oral Roberts	L 78–84	15–11 (10–5)	Mabee Center (718); Tulsa, OK
03/01/2014; 2:00 pm	at Central Arkansas	W 56–53	16–11 (11–5)	Farris Center (1,312); Conway, AR
03/06/2014; 5:30 pm	New Orleans	W 83–51	17–11 (12–5)	Montagne Center (890); Beaumont, TX
03/08/2014; 4:00 pm	Southeastern Louisiana	W 92–77	18–11 (13–5)	Montagne Center (824); Beaumont, TX
Southland Conference Tournament
03/15/2014; 12:00 pm, ESPN3	vs. Northwestern State; Semifinals	L 60–61	18–12	Leonard E. Merrell Center (N/A); Katy, TX
Women's National Invitational Tournament (WNIT)
03/20/2014; 7:00 pm	vs. Southern Miss; First Round	L 60–75	18–13	Reed Green Coliseum (882); Hattiesburg, MS
*Non-conference game. ^{#}Rankings from AP Poll. (#) Tournament seedings in parentheses. All times are in Central Time.

== See also ==
2013–14 Lamar Cardinals basketball team
