= 2013–14 Abilene Christian Wildcats women's basketball team =

Intercollegiate basketball season

2013–14 Abilene Christian Wildcats women's basketball
- Conference: Southland Conference
- Record: 18–12 (8–6 Southland (1st Year of Transition))
- Head coach: Julie Goodenough (2nd season)
- Assistant coach: Kendra Hassell (1st season)
- Home arena: Moody Coliseum

2013–14 Southland Conference women's basketball standings
| | Conf. | | | | Overall |
| Team | W | | L | PCT | W | | L | PCT |
|---|---|---|---|---|---|---|---|---|
| Lamar | 13 | – | 5 | .722 | 18 | – | 13 | .581 |
| Stephen F. Austin | 13 | – | 5 | .722 | 23 | – | 13 | .639 |
| Central Arkansas | 12 | – | 6 | .667 | 18 | – | 12 | .600 |
| Northwestern State† | 11 | – | 7 | .611 | 21 | – | 13 | .618 |
| Nicholls State | 11 | – | 7 | .611 | 17 | – | 14 | .548 |
| Texas A&M-CC | 11 | – | 7 | .611 | 18 | – | 12 | .600 |
| Abilene Christian* | 8 | – | 6 | .571 | 18 | – | 12 | .600 |
| McNeese State | 10 | – | 8 | .556 | 19 | – | 14 | .576 |
| Oral Roberts | 8 | – | 10 | .444 | 9 | – | 20 | .310 |
| Houston Baptist | 8 | – | 10 | .444 | 12 | – | 17 | .414 |
| Sam Houston State | 8 | – | 10 | .444 | 13 | – | 16 | .448 |
| Southeastern Louisiana | 7 | – | 11 | .389 | 8 | – | 22 | .267 |
| Incarnate Word* | 2 | – | 12 | .143 | 8 | – | 19 | .296 |
| New Orleans** | 0 | – | 18 | .000 | 0 | – | 29 | .000 |
† 2014 Southland tournament winner As of March 22, 2014 *ineligible for postseason play due to Div. I transition **ineligible for postseason play due to APR penalties Rankings from AP poll

The 2013–14 Abilene Christian Wildcats women's basketball team represented Abilene Christian University during the 2013–14 NCAA Division I women's basketball season. The Wildcats were led by second-year head coach Julie Goodenough and played their home games at the Moody Coliseum. They were new members of the Southland Conference. Since this was the first year of a four-year transition phase from D2 to D1, Abilene Christian could not participate in the Southland Tournament nor the NCAA Tournament. They played each conference foe only once, with the exception of Incarnate Word. The Wildcats would have been able to participate in the WNIT or WBI tournaments if they had been invited.

== Roster ==
| Number | Name | Position | Height | Year | Hometown |
|---|---|---|---|---|---|
| 2 | Katelyn Goodman | Guard | 5–8 | Freshman | Abilene, Texas |
| 10 | Jessica Elkins | Guard | 5–10 | Freshman | Houston, Texas |
| 12 | Whitney West | Guard | 5–7 | Sophomore | Portland, Texas |
| 15 | Alexis Mason | Guard | 5–9 | Freshman | McKinney, Texas |
| 21 | Cemetra Jenkins | Guard | 5–4 | Sophomore | Mesquite, Texas |
| 23 | Suzzy Dimba | Forward | 5–11 | Freshman | Lubbock, Texas |
| 24 | Brianne Jolivet | Forward | 5–9 | Freshman | Houston, Texas |
| 25 | Chelsea Ngo | Guard | 5–5 | Freshman | Houston, Texas |
| 30 | Renata Marquez | Forward | 5–8 | Senior | Conroe, Texas |
| 32 | Lizzy Dimba | Forward | 5–11 | Freshman | Lubbock, Texas |
| 33 | Sydney Shelstead | Forward | 6–3 | Freshman | Mineral Wells, Texas |
| 34 | Erin Maxwell | Center | 6–4 | Freshman | Cedar Hill, Texas |

== Schedule ==
| Date time, TV | Opponent | Result | Record | Site (attendance) city, state |
Regular season
| 11/08/2013*; 7:00 pm | Texas Lutheran | W 111–73 | 1–0 | Moody Coliseum (608); Abilene, TX |
| 11/11/2013*; 7:00 pm | Wayland Baptist | W 79–59 | 2–0 | Moody Coliseum (411); Abilene, TX |
| 11/14/2013*; 7:00 pm | Angelo State | W 87–41 | 3–0 | Moody Coliseum (441); Abilene, TX |
| 11/19/2013*; 7:00 pm | Northwood | W 105–44 | 4–0 | Moody Coliseum (319); Abilene, TX |
| 11/23/2013*; 7:30 pm | at North Texas; North Texas Tournament | L 50–64 | 4–1 | The Super Pit (680); Denton, TX |
| 11/24/2013*; 3:00 pm | vs. Grand Canyon; North Texas Tournament | L 57–70 | 4–2 | The Super Pit (127); Denton, TX |
| 11/27/2013*; 7:00 pm | at UT Arlington | W 79–72 | 5–2 | College Park Center (781); Arlington, TX |
| 12/03/2013*; 5:30 pm | Texas A&M–Commerce | W 92–64 | 6–2 | Moody Coliseum (1,223); Abilene, TX |
| 12/14/2013*; 2:00 pm | at Tulsa | L 61–81 | 6–3 | Reynolds Center (407); Tulsa, OK |
| 12/17/2013*; 5:30 pm | Texas Wesleyan | W 93–69 | 7–3 | Moody Coliseum (216); Abilene, TX |
| 12/18/2013*; 7:00 pm, FCS | at TCU | L 55–82 | 7–4 | Daniel-Meyer Coliseum (2,063); Ft. Worth, TX |
| 12/20/2013*; 8:00 pm | vs. Florida Atlantic; Travelers Invitational | L 63–67 | 7–5 | United Spirit Arena (3,419); Lubbock, TX |
| 12/21/2013*; 12:00 pm | Jacksonville; Travelers invitational | W 76–72 | 8–5 | United Spirit Arena (N/A); Lubbock, TX |
| 12/22/2013*; 2:00 pm | Texas Tech; Travelers invitational | W 58–57 | 9–5 | United Spirit Arena (4,089); Lubbock, TX |
| 01/04/2014*; 4:00 pm | at UTSA | L 58–63 | 9–6 | Convocation Center (448); San Antonio, TX |
| 01/09/2014; 5:30 pm | at New Orleans | W 88–44 | 10–6 (1–0) | Lakefront Arena (583); New Orleans, LA |
| 01/16/2014; 5:30 pm | Oral Roberts | W 70–56 | 11–6 (2–0) | Moody Coliseum (816); Abilene, TX |
| 01/18/2014; 1:00 pm | Central Arkansas | L 54–67 | 11–7 (2–1) | Moody Coliseum (318); Abilene, TX |
| 01/23/2014; 5:30 pm | Lamar | L 83–85 | 11–8 (2–2) | Moody Coliseum (623); Abilene, TX |
| 01/25/2014; 1:00 pm, ESPN3 | Sam Houston State | W 73–67 | 12–8 (3–2) | Moody Coliseum (1,250); Abilene, TX |
| 01/30/2014; 6:00 pm | at Stephen F. Austin | L 48–64 | 12–9 (3–3) | William R. Johnson Coliseum (2,836); Nacogdoches, TX |
| 02/01/2014; 1:00 pm | at Northwestern State | L 72–76 | 12–10 (3–4) | Prather Coliseum (1,031); Natchitoches, LA |
| 02/06/2014; 5:30 pm | Houston Baptist | W 82–70 | 13–10 (4–4) | Moody Coliseum (897); Abilene, TX |
| 02/08/2014; 1:00 pm | Texas A&M–Corpus Christi | L 71–74 | 13–11 (4–5) | Moody Coliseum (1,025); Abilene, TX |
| 02/13/2014; 5:30 pm, ESPN3 | at Incarnate Word | W 73–67 | 14–11 (5–5) | McDermott Convocation Center (456); San Antonio, TX |
| 02/18/2014*; 5:30 pm | Arlington Baptist | W 108–56 | 15–11 | Moody Coliseum (1,018); Abilene, TX |
| 02/27/2014; 2:00 pm | at Nicholls State | W 78–62 | 16–11 (6–5) | Stopher Gym (105); Thibodaux, LA |
| 03/01/2014; 1:00 pm | at McNeese State | L 64-71 | 16–12 (6–6) | Burton Coliseum (571); Lake Charles, LA |
| 03/03/2014; 1:00 pm | at Southeastern Louisiana | W 96-82 | 17–12 (7–6) | University Center (230); Hammond, LA |
| 03/08/2014; 1:00 pm | Incarnate Word | W 90-79 | 18–12 (8–6) | Moody Coliseum (1,382); Abilene, TX |
*Non-conference game. ^{#}Rankings from AP Poll. (#) Tournament seedings in parentheses. All times are in Central Time.

== See also ==
- 2013–14 Abilene Christian Wildcats men's basketball team
