= 2014 Women's Basketball Invitational =

American women's college basketball tournament

- Season: 2013–14
- Teams: 16
- Champions: UIC

The 2014 Women's Basketball Invitational (WBI) was a single-elimination tournament of 16 National Collegiate Athletic Association (NCAA) Division I teams that did not participate in the 2014 NCAA Division I women's basketball tournament or 2014 WNIT. The field of 16 was announced on March 17, 2014. All games were hosted by the higher seed throughout the tournament, unless the higher seed's arena was unavailable. The championship game was hosted by the school with the higher end of the season RPI. The tournament was won by the UIC Flames of the University of Illinois Chicago.

== Bracket ==
=== West Region ===
1st Round; March 19–20
1	Grand Canyon	51
8	Boise State	52
4	Stephen F. Austin	59
5	Texas State	51
2	Charleston	85
7	USC Upstate	71
3	Northern Kentucky	84
6	McNeese State	72

Quarterfinals; March 22–23
8	Boise State	59
4	Stephen F. Austin	80
2	Charleston	60
3	Northern Kentucky	54

Semi-finals; March 27
4	Stephen F. Austin	78
2	Charleston	74

=== East Region ===
1st Round; March 19–20
1	Eastern Michigan	78
8	Evansville	65
4	UIC	84
5	IPFW	71
2	Bucknell	47
7	Maine	77
3	Bryant	86
6	Fairfield	90

Quarterfinals; March 22–23
1	Eastern Michigan	91
4	UIC	93
7	Maine	50
6	Fairfield	63

Semi-finals; March 27
4	UIC	74
6	Fairfield	44

*#7 Maine will host #2 Bucknell in First round.

=== WBI Championship Game ===
Championship Game; March 29
4W	Stephen F. Austin	64
4E	UIC	73

== See also ==
- 2014 NCAA Division I women's basketball tournament
- 2014 Women's National Invitation Tournament
- Women's Basketball Invitational
