= 2013–14 Cal State Bakersfield Roadrunners women's basketball team =

Intercollegiate basketball season

2013–14 Cal State Bakersfield Roadrunners women's basketball
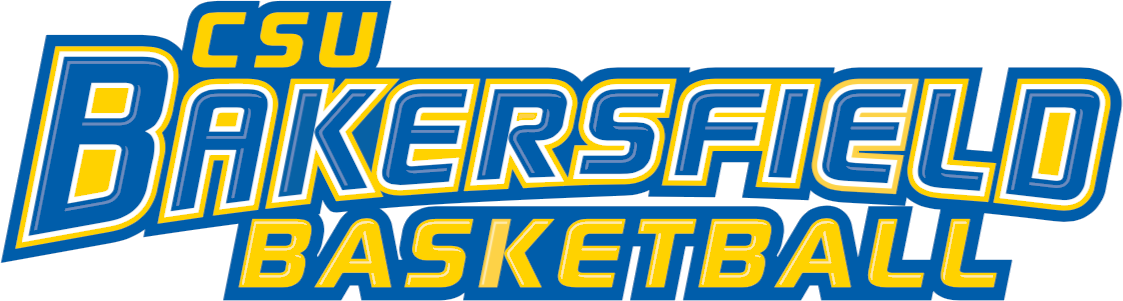

WNIT, First Round
- Conference: Western Athletic Conference
- Record: 19–12 (12–4 WAC)
- Head coach: Greg McCall (3rd season)
- Assistant coaches: Tasha Burnett (3rd season); Zack Grasmick (3rd season); Xavier Johnson (1st season)
- Home arena: Icardo Center

2013–14 WAC women's basketball standings
	Conf.				Overall
Team	W		L	PCT	W		L	PCT
Idaho†	15	–	1	.938	25	–	9	.735
Cal State Bakersfield	12	–	4	.750	19	–	12	.613
Grand Canyon*	10	–	6	.625	21	–	9	.700
Seattle U	9	–	7	.563	16	–	16	.500
Texas-Pan American	8	–	8	.500	14	–	16	.467
New Mexico State	7	–	9	.438	11	–	20	.355
UMKC	7	–	9	.438	11	–	19	.367
Utah Valley	4	–	12	.250	7	–	23	.233
Chicago State	0	–	16	.000	3	–	27	.100
† 2014 WAC tournament winner As of March 22, 2014 * Grand Canyon ineligible for WAC Basketball Tournament as part of reclassification from Division II; Rankings from AP poll

The 2013–14 Cal State Bakersfield Roadrunners women's basketball team represented California State University, Bakersfield during the 2013–14 NCAA Division I women's basketball season. The Roadrunners were led by third year head coach Greg McCall and played their home games at the Icardo Center. The Roadrunners competed as members of the Western Athletic Conference. The Roadrunners would finish second in the WAC regular season and qualify for the 2014 WNIT.

== Roster ==
Number	Name	Position	Weight	Year	Hometown
1	Alyssa Shannon	Guard	5–2	Sophomore	Bakersfield, California
2	Brittany Sims	Forward	6–3	Freshman	Fresno, California
3	Shaquita Smith	Guard	6–0	Junior	Salt Lake City, Utah
3	Javonte Maynor	Guard	5–5	Junior	Buffalo, New York
4	Melissa Sweat	Guard	5–11	Senior	Bakersfield, California
5	Batabe Zempare	Forward	6–2	Sophomore	Accra, Ghana
11	Brooklynn Hinkens	Guard	5–5	Junior	Lake Tapps, Washington
13	Dajy Vines	Forward	5–9	Redshirt Junior	Oxnard, California
15	Erika Williams	Guard	6–0	Redshirt Freshman	Fresno, California
20	Tyler Collins	Forward	6–1	Redshirt Sophomore	Birmingham, Alabama
21	Nichole Walker	Guard	5–5	Redshirt Freshman	Bakersfield, California
22	Marilyn Naderhoff	Guard	5–8	Redshirt Junior	Santee, California
23	Miranda Williamson	Forward	6–2	Freshman	San Diego, California
31	Brianna Jorgsensen	Center	6–3	Freshman	South Jordan, Utah
34	Janae Coffee	Center	6–4	Redshirt Junior	Fresno, California
44	Tyonna Outland	Guard	5–8	Redshirt Junior	Compton, California

== Schedule ==
Date time, TV	Opponent	Result	Record	Site (attendance) city, state
Regular Season
11/09/2013*; 7:00 pm	at Oregon	L 91–131	0–1	Matthew Knight Arena (1,026); Eugene, OR
11/11/2013*; 7:00 pm	at Oregon St.	L 49–80	0–2	Gill Coliseum (1,042); Corvallis, OR
11/20/2013*; 7:00 pm	Concordia-Irvine	W 84–79	1–2	Icardo Center (521); Bakersfield, CA
11/23/2013*; 4:00 pm, MW Net	at UNLV	L 74–76	1–3	Cox Pavilion (1,007); Las Vegas, NV
11/30/2013*; 1:00 pm	Nebraska–Omaha	W 69–65	2–3	Icardo Center (252); Bakersfield, CA
12/03/2013*; 7:00 pm, BigWest.tv	at UC Riverside	L 66–85	2–4	UC Riverside Student Recreation Center (223); Riverside, CA
12/07/2013*; 5:00 pm, BigWest.tv	at Cal Poly	L 54–63	2–5	Mott Gym (451); San Luis Obispo, CA
12/11/2013*; 7:00 pm, USF TV	at San Francisco	W 85–70	3–5	War Memorial Gymnasium (222); San Francisco, CA
12/15/2013*; 2:00 pm	at Cal	L 51–70	3–6	Haas Pavilion (1,836); Berkeley, CA
12/19/2013*; 7:07 pm	Houston Baptist	W 81–61	4–6	Icardo Center (154); Bakersfield, CA
12/30/2013*; 7:00 pm	Fresno Pacific	W 81–49	5–6	Icardo Center (228); Bakersfield, CA
01/02/2014*; 7:00 pm	at Cal State Northridge	W 74–73 ^{OT}	6–6	Matadome (347); Northridge, CA
01/04/2014; 2:00 pm	at Utah Valley	W 61–59	7–6 (1–0)	UCCU Center (219); Orem, UT
01/09/2014; 6:00 pm	at Grand Canyon	L 64–78	7–7 (1–1)	GCU Arena (517); Phoenix, AZ
01/16/2014; 7:00 pm	Seattle	W 80–78	8–7 (2–1)	Icardo Center (483); Bakersfield, CA
01/18/2014; 3:00 pm	Idaho	L 69–96	8–8 (2–2)	Icardo Center (227); Bakersfield, CA
01/23/2014; 5:00 pm	at Chicago State	W 90–59	9–8 (3–2)	Emil and Patricia Jones Convocation Center (263); Chicago, IL
01/25/2014; 12:00 pm	at UMKC	W 87–80	10–8 (4–2)	Swinney Recreation Center (696); Kansas City, MO
01/30/2014; 7:00 pm	New Mexico State	W 86–63	11–8 (5–2)	Icardo Center (374); Bakersfield, CA
02/01/2014; 1:00 pm	Texas–Pan American	W 82–74	12–8 (6–2)	Icardo Center (325); Bakersfield, CA
02/08/2014; 1:00 pm	Grand Canyon	W 77–70	13–8 (7–2)	Icardo Center (345); Bakersfield, CA
02/13/2014; 6:00 pm	at Idaho	W 79–60	14–8 (8–2)	Cowan Spectrum (789); Moscow, ID
02/15/2014; 4:00 pm	at Seattle	L 67–74	14–9 (8–3)	Connolly Center (335); Seattle, WA
02/20/2014; 7:00 pm	UMKC	W 97–91	15–9 (9–3)	Icardo Center (275); Bakersfield, CA
02/22/2014; 1:00 pm	Chicago State	W 99–58	16–9 (10–3)	Icardo Center (213); Bakersfield, CA
02/27/2014; 5:00 pm	at Texas-Pan American	L 62–84	16–10 (10–4)	UTPA Fieldhouse (487); Edinburg, TX
03/01/2014; 5:00 pm	at New Mexico State	W 96–90	17–10 (11–4)	Pan American Center (455); Las Cruces, NM
03/08/2014; 1:00 pm	Utah Valley	W 66–51	18–10 (12–4)	Icardo Center (358); Bakersfield, CA
2014 WAC tournament
03/12/2014; 8:30 pm	vs. Utah Valley; Quarterfinals	W 65–63	19–10	Orleans Arena (623); Paradise, NV
03/14/2014; 2:30 pm	vs. New Mexico State; Semifinals	L 79–84	19–11	Orleans Arena (897); Paradise, NV
2014 WNIT
03/21/2014*; 6:00 pm	at Saint Mary's; 1st Round	L 68–75	19–12	McKeon Pavilion (250); Moraga, CA
*Non-conference game. ^{#}Rankings from AP Poll. (#) Tournament seedings in parentheses. All times are in Pacific Time.

== See also ==
- Cal State Bakersfield Roadrunners women's basketball
  - 2015–16 Cal State Bakersfield Roadrunners women's basketball team
- 2013–14 Cal State Bakersfield Roadrunners men's basketball team
