= 2013–14 Seattle Redhawks women's basketball team =

Intercollegiate basketball season

2013–14 Seattle Redhawks women's basketball

2013 Delta Dental Thanksgiving Classic Champions
- Conference: Western Athletic Conference
- Record: 16–16 (9–7 WAC)
- Head coach: Joan Bonvicini (5th season)
- Assistant coaches: Kristen O'Neill (5th season); Shaquala Williams (2nd season); Derek Liebert (1st season)
- Home arena: Connolly Center

2013–14 WAC women's basketball standings
| | Conf. | | | | Overall |
| Team | W | | L | PCT | W | | L | PCT |
|---|---|---|---|---|---|---|---|---|
| Idaho† | 15 | – | 1 | .938 | 25 | – | 9 | .735 |
| Cal State Bakersfield | 12 | – | 4 | .750 | 19 | – | 12 | .613 |
| Grand Canyon* | 10 | – | 6 | .625 | 21 | – | 9 | .700 |
| Seattle U | 9 | – | 7 | .563 | 16 | – | 16 | .500 |
| Texas-Pan American | 8 | – | 8 | .500 | 14 | – | 16 | .467 |
| New Mexico State | 7 | – | 9 | .438 | 11 | – | 20 | .355 |
| UMKC | 7 | – | 9 | .438 | 11 | – | 19 | .367 |
| Utah Valley | 4 | – | 12 | .250 | 7 | – | 23 | .233 |
| Chicago State | 0 | – | 16 | .000 | 3 | – | 27 | .100 |
† 2014 WAC tournament winner As of March 22, 2014 * Grand Canyon ineligible for WAC Basketball Tournament as part of reclassification from Division II; Rankings from AP poll

The 2013–14 Seattle Redhawks women's basketball team represented Seattle University during the 2013–14 NCAA Division I women's basketball season. The Redhawks, led by fifth-year head coach Joan Bonvicini, played their home games at the Connolly Center and were members of the Western Athletic Conference. The Redhawks claimed the #3 seed in the WAC and advanced to their second consecutive WAC Championship game. The Redhawks finished the season 16–16, 9–7 in the conference.

== Roster ==
| # | Name | Height | Position | Class | Hometown |
|---|---|---|---|---|---|
| 1 | Sylvia Shephard | 5'10" | G | Senior | Alta Loma, California |
| 2 | Kaylee Best | 5'8" | G | Freshman | Seattle, Washington |
| 10 | Makenna Clark | 5'6" | G | Junior | Lake Tapps, Washington |
| 11 | Tatiana Howard | 6'2" | C/F | Freshman | Gardena, California |
| 12 | Claire Metoyer | 5'9" | G | Freshman | DeSoto, Texas |
| 14 | Ashley Ward | 5'11" | F | Senior | Irvine, California |
| 15 | Catherine Perez | 6'1" | F | Sophomore | Palo Alto, California |
| 20 | Kim Flournoy | 5'9" | G | Redshirt sophomore | San Diego, California |
| 23 | Renee Dillard-Brown | 6'1" | F | Junior | Seattle, WA |
| 24 | Alexis Montgomery | 5'10" | G | Freshman | Beaverton, Oregon |
| 31 | Taelor Ross | 6'2" | C | Sophomore | Vancouver, WA |
| 32 | Kristen Stoffel | 5'11" | G | Sophomore | Mill Creek, WA |
| 41 | Kacie Sowell | 6'2" | F | Senior | Ventura, California |
| 45 | Wilma Afunugo | 6'0" | F/C | Freshman | Plano, Texas |

== Schedule ==
| Date time, TV | Opponent | Result | Record | Site (attendance) city, state |
Exhibition
| 11/02/2013*; 1:00 pm | Central Washington | W 91–60 | - | Connolly Center (150); Seattle, WA |
Regular season
| 11/08/2013*; 7:00 pm | Pepperdine | L 73–84 | 0–1 | Connolly Center (506); Seattle, WA |
| 11/12/2013*; 7:00 pm | Washington State | L 72–81 | 0–2 | Connolly Center (307); Seattle, WA |
| 11/19/2013*; 7:00 pm | at Washington | L 60–82 | 0–3 | Alaska Airlines Arena (1,567); Seattle, WA |
| 11/22/2013*; 8:00 pm, Watch Big Sky | at Portland State | W 80–68 | 1–3 | Stott Center (553); Portland, OR |
| 11/24/2013*; 4:00 pm | at Portland | L 63–70 | 1–4 | Chiles Center (318); Portland, OR |
| 11/29/2013*; 7:00 pm | Coastal Carolina; Delta Dental Thanksgiving Tournament | W 84–53 | 2–4 | Connolly Center (360); Seattle, WA |
| 11/30/2013*; 6:30 pm | Cornell; Delta Dental Thanksgiving Tournament | W 52–49 | 3–4 | Connolly Center (230); Seattle, WA |
| 12/04/2013*; 6:00 pm | Oregon | L 100–105 | 3–5 | KeyArena (648); Seattle, WA |
| 12/08/2013*; 2:00 pm | at San Diego | L 56–79 | 3–6 | Jenny Craig Pavilion (144); San Diego, CA |
| 12/14/2013*; 2:00 pm | Montana State | W 74–63 | 4–6 | Connolly Center (236); Seattle, WA |
| 12/19/2013*; 7:00 pm | at Loyola Marymount | W 72–70 | 5–6 | Gersten Pavilion (430); Los Angeles, CA |
| 12/21/2013*; 6:00 pm, BigWest.TV | at Cal State Fullerton | L 53–55 | 5–7 | Titan Gym (157); Fullerton, CA |
| 12/28/2013*; 2:00 pm, BigWest.TV | at UC Santa Barbara | L 75–78 | 5–8 | The Thunderdome (419); Santa Barbara, CA |
| 01/02/2014; 5:00 pm | at Chicago State | W 85–58 | 6–8 (1–0) | Emil and Patricia Jones Convocation Center (329); Chicago, IL |
| 01/04/2014; 12:00 pm | at UMKC | L 65–77 | 6–9 (1–1) | Swinney Recreation Center (329); Kansas City, MO |
| 01/09/2014; 7:00 pm | New Mexico State | W 61–51 | 7–9 (2–1) | Connolly Center (378); Seattle, WA |
| 01/11/2014; 4:00 pm | Texas–Pan American | W 84–62 | 8–9 (3–1) | Connolly Center (148); Seattle, WA |
| 01/16/2014; 7:00 pm | at Cal State Bakersfield | L 78–80 | 8–10 (3–2) | Icardo Center (483); Bakersfield, CA |
| 01/18/2014; 2:00 pm | at Utah Valley | W 75–67 | 9–10 (4–2) | PE Building (202); Orem, UT |
| 01/25/2014; 4:00 pm | Grand Canyon | W 89–68 | 10–10 (5–2) | Connolly Center (358); Seattle, WA |
| 02/01/2014; 2:00 pm | Idaho | L 59–77 | 10–11 (5–3) | Connolly Center (460); Seattle, WA |
| 02/06/2014; 5:00 pm | at Texas-Pan American | W 75–68 | 11–11 (6–3) | UTPA Fieldhouse (324); Edinburg, TX |
| 02/08/2014; 6:00 pm, ESPN3 | at New Mexico State | L 81–86 | 11–12 (6–4) | Pan American Center (375); Las Cruces, NM |
| 02/13/2014; 7:00 pm | Utah Valley | W 69–65 | 12–12 (7–4) | Connolly Center (276); Seattle, WA |
| 02/15/2014; 4:00 pm | Cal State Bakersfield | W 74–67 | 13–12 (8–4) | Connolly Center (335); Seattle, WA |
| 02/20/2014; 6:00 pm | at Grand Canyon | L 66–72 | 13–13 (8–5) | GCU Arena (450); Phoenix, AZ |
| 03/01/2014; 2:00 pm | at Idaho | L 57–60 | 13–14 (8–6) | Cowan Spectrum (1,054); Moscow, ID |
| 03/06/2014; 7:00 pm | UMKC | L 71–73 ^{OT} | 13–15 (8–7) | Connolly Center (262); Seattle, WA |
| 03/08/2014; 4:00 pm | Chicago State | W 75–63 | 14–15 (9–7) | Connolly Center (634); Seattle, WA |
2014 WAC tournament
| 03/12/2014; 6:00 pm | vs. UMKC; Quarterfinals | W 81–76 | 15–15 | Orleans Arena (N/A); Paradise, NV |
| 03/14/2014; 2:30 pm | vs. Cal State Bakersfield; Semifinals | W 84–79 | 16–15 | Orleans Arena (897); Paradise, NV |
| 03/15/2014; 1:00 pm, ESPNU | vs. Idaho; Championship | L 67–75 | 16–16 | Orleans Arena (588); Paradise, NV |
*Non-conference game. ^{#}Rankings from AP Poll. (#) Tournament seedings in parentheses. All times are in Pacific Time.

== See also ==
- 2013–14 Seattle Redhawks men's basketball team
