= 2013–14 Chicago State Cougars women's basketball team =

Intercollegiate basketball season

2013–14 Chicago State Cougars women's basketball
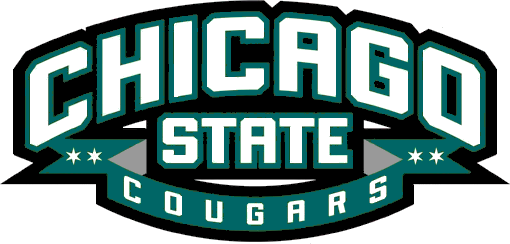
- Conference: Western Athletic Conference
- Record: 3–27 (0–16 WAC)
- Head coach: Angela Jackson (11th season)
- Assistant coaches: Renada Blackburn (8th season); Gloria Bradley (1st season); Loretta Soria (1st season)
- Home arena: Emil and Patricia Jones Convocation Center

2013–14 WAC women's basketball standings
	Conf.				Overall
Team	W		L	PCT	W		L	PCT
Idaho†	15	–	1	.938	25	–	9	.735
Cal State Bakersfield	12	–	4	.750	19	–	12	.613
Grand Canyon*	10	–	6	.625	21	–	9	.700
Seattle U	9	–	7	.563	16	–	16	.500
Texas-Pan American	8	–	8	.500	14	–	16	.467
New Mexico State	7	–	9	.438	11	–	20	.355
UMKC	7	–	9	.438	11	–	19	.367
Utah Valley	4	–	12	.250	7	–	23	.233
Chicago State	0	–	16	.000	3	–	27	.100
† 2014 WAC tournament winner As of March 22, 2014 * Grand Canyon ineligible for WAC Basketball Tournament as part of reclassification from Division II; Rankings from AP poll

The 2013–14 Chicago State Cougars women's basketball team represented Chicago State University during the 2013–14 college basketball season. The Cougars, led by eleventh year head coach Angela Jackson, played their home games at the Emil and Patricia Jones Convocation Center as new members of the Western Athletic Conference. The Cougars finished the season winless in WAC play.

== Roster ==
Number	Name	Position	Weight	Year	Hometown
2	Tierra Williams	Guard	5–7	Junior	Detroit, Michigan
4	Sarah Amamlou	Guard	5–6	Freshman	Copenhagen, Denmark
5	Paris Williams	Forward	6–0	Junior	Saint Louis, Missouri
11	Konner Harris	Guard	5–9	Freshman	Sidney, Ohio
12	Chanel Wilson-Stewart	Center	6–3	Junior	Hillside, Illinois
20	Cailin Knox	Guard	5–9	Freshman	Martinsville, Indiana
21	Jasmine Sanders	Guard	5–4	Sophomore	Country Club Hills, Illinois
25	Layne Murphy	Forward	6–2	Sophomore	Country Club Hills, Illinois
30	Jessica Cerda	Guard	5–10	Freshman	Streamwood, Illinois
33	Jasmine Wood	Forward	6–1	Sophomore	Lansing, Michigan
42	Jakeisha Wells	Forward	6–3	Sophomore	Chicago, Illinois
44	Jaliria Wells	Forward	6–2	Freshman	Chicago, Illinois
54	Tashuna Brown	Forward	6–1	Junior	New York City, New York

== Schedule and results ==
Date time, TV	Opponent	Result	Record	Site (attendance) city, state
Regular Season
11/09/2013*; 2:00 pm, CSU TV	Indiana Institute of Technology	W 74–51	1–0	Emil and Patricia Jones Convocation Center (369); Chicago, IL
11/13/2013*; 6:30 pm, BTND	at Northwestern	L 33–64	1–1	Welsh-Ryan Arena (375); Evanston, IL
11/16/2013*; 1:00 pm	at Miami (OH)	L 39–55	1–2	Millett Hall (406); Oxford, OH
11/18/2013*; 7:00 pm	at Nebraska–Omaha	L 62–76	1–3	Lee & Helene Sapp Fieldhouse (356); Omaha, NE
11/23/2013*; 2:00 pm, CSU TV	IUPUI	L 47–68	1–4	Emil and Patricia Jones Convocation Center (381); Chicago, IL
11/26/2013*; 7:00 pm, CSU TV	Purdue Calumet	L 62–68	1–5	Emil and Patricia Jones Convocation Center (279); Chicago, IL
12/01/2013*; 2:00 pm, CSU TV	Western Michigan	L 49–67	1–6	Emil and Patricia Jones Convocation Center (242); Chicago, IL
12/06/2013*; 3:30 pm	vs. Valparaiso; Toledo Invitational	L 50–74	1–7	Savage Arena (N/A); Toledo, OH
12/07/2013*; 1:00 pm	vs. Detroit; Toledo Invitational	L 64–85	1–8	Savage Arena (N/A); Toledo, OH
12/20/2013*; 6:00 pm	at Southern Illinois	W 55–51	2–8	SIU Arena (405); Carbondale, IL
12/29/2013*; 2:00 pm, CSU TV	Wright State	L 62–84	2–9	Emil and Patricia Jones Convocation Center (235); Chicago, IL
12/31/2013*; 2:00 pm, CSU TV	Loyola	L 63–77	2–10	Emil and Patricia Jones Convocation Center (316); Chicago, IL
01/02/2014; 7:00 pm, CSU TV	Seattle	L 58–85	2–11 (0–1)	Emil and Patricia Jones Convocation Center (202); Chicago, IL
01/04/2014; 2:00 pm, CSU TV	Idaho	L 42–92	2–12 (0–2)	Emil and Patricia Jones Convocation Center (200); Chicago, IL
01/08/2014*; 7:00 pm, CSU TV	Indiana Northwest	W 68–50	3–12	Emil and Patricia Jones Convocation Center (212); Chicago, IL
01/11/2014; 2:00 pm	at UMKC	L 60–83	3–13 (0–3)	Municipal Auditorium (380); Kansas City, MO
01/16/2014; 7:00 pm	at New Mexico State	L 61–82	3–14 (0–4)	Pan American Center (942); Las Cruces, NM
01/18/2014; 7:00 pm	at Texas–Pan American	L 44–66	3–15 (0–5)	UTPA Fieldhouse (382); Edinburg, TX
01/23/2014; 7:00 pm, CSU TV	Cal State Bakersfield	L 59–90	3–16 (0–6)	Emil and Patricia Jones Convocation Center (263); Chicago, IL
01/25/2014; 2:00 pm, CSU TV	Utah Valley	L 46–72	3–17 (0–7)	Emil and Patricia Jones Convocation Center (211); Chicago, IL
01/30/2014; 8:00 pm, Cox7	at Grand Canyon	L 53–84	3–18 (0–8)	GCU Arena (581); Phoenix, AZ
02/08/2014; 2:00 pm, CSU TV	UMKC	L 52–84	3–19 (0–9)	Emil and Patricia Jones Convocation Center (201); Chicago, IL
02/13/2014; 7:00 pm, CSU TV	Texas–Pan American	L 52–75	3–20 (0–10)	Emil and Patricia Jones Convocation Center (207); Chicago, IL
02/15/2014; 2:00 pm, CSU TV	New Mexico State	L 64–74	3–21 (0–11)	Emil and Patricia Jones Convocation Center (230); Chicago, IL
02/20/2014; 8:00 pm	at Utah Valley	L 62–84	3–22 (0–12)	UCCU Center (191); Orem, UT
02/22/204; 3:00 pm	at Cal State Bakersfield	L 58–99	3–23 (0–13)	Icardo Center (213); Bakersfield, CA
03/01/2014; 2:00 pm, CSU TV	Grand Canyon	L 38–69	3–24 (0–14)	Emil and Patricia Jones Convocation Center (230); Chicago, IL
03/06/2014; 8:00 pm	at Idaho	L 41–91	3–25 (0–15)	Cowan Spectrum (501); Moscow, ID
03/08/2014; 6:00 pm	at Seattle	L 63–75	3–26 (0–16)	Connolly Center (634); Seattle, WA
2014 WAC women's basketball tournament
03/12/2014; 2:00 pm	vs. Idaho; Quarterfinals	L 43–84	3–27	Orleans Arena (N/A); Las Vegas, NV
*Non-conference game. ^{#}Rankings from AP Poll. (#) Tournament seedings in parentheses. All times are in Central.

== See also ==
- 2013–14 Chicago State Cougars men's basketball team
