= 2013–14 New Mexico State Aggies women's basketball team =

Intercollegiate basketball season

2013–14 New Mexico State Aggies women's basketball
- Conference: Western Athletic Conference
- Record: 11–20 (7–9 WAC)
- Head coach: Mark Trakh (3rd season)
- Assistant coaches: Tamara Inoue (3rd season); Aarika Hughes (3rd season); Erica Sanchez (1st season)
- Home arena: Pan American Center

2013–14 WAC women's basketball standings
	Conf.				Overall
Team	W		L	PCT	W		L	PCT
Idaho†	15	–	1	.938	25	–	9	.735
Cal State Bakersfield	12	–	4	.750	19	–	12	.613
Grand Canyon*	10	–	6	.625	21	–	9	.700
Seattle U	9	–	7	.563	16	–	16	.500
Texas-Pan American	8	–	8	.500	14	–	16	.467
New Mexico State	7	–	9	.438	11	–	20	.355
UMKC	7	–	9	.438	11	–	19	.367
Utah Valley	4	–	12	.250	7	–	23	.233
Chicago State	0	–	16	.000	3	–	27	.100
† 2014 WAC tournament winner As of March 22, 2014 * Grand Canyon ineligible for WAC Basketball Tournament as part of reclassification from Division II; Rankings from AP poll

The 2013–14 New Mexico State Aggies women's basketball team represented New Mexico State University during the 2013–14 NCAA Division I women's basketball season. The Aggies, led by third year head coach Mark Trakh, played their home games at the Pan American Center and were members of the Western Athletic Conference. They came into the season as the most senior member of the WAC and as the defending WAC Conference Tournament Champions. The Aggies would finish the season at 11–20 and claim the 5-seed in the WAC Tournament.

== Roster ==
Number	Name	Position	Height	Year	Hometown
2	Audra Jones	Center	6–5	Freshman	Orland, California
3	Vanessa Garner	Guard	5–8	Freshman	Milpitas, California
4	Sasha Weber	Guard	6–0	Sophomore	Lacey, Washington
10	Simone Ruedin	Guard	5–8	Junior	Eltham, Victoria, Australia
11	Danesia Williamson	Guard	5–6	Junior	San Diego, California
12	Tamera William	Guard	5–9	Freshman	Las Vegas, Nevada
15	Jasmine Rutledge	Guard	6–0	Senior	Manhattan Beach, California
20	Brandee Walton	Forward	5–11	Freshman	Surprise, Arizona
22	Tyler Ellis	Forward	6–2	Freshman	Antelope, California
23	Abby Scott	Guard	6–1	Sophomore	Madras, Oregon
24	Brianna Freeman	Forward	6–1	Freshman	Killeen, Texas
33	September Offutt	Forward	6–2	Junior	Pomona, California
35	Moriah Mack	Guard	5–8	Freshman	San Antonio, Texas
43	Elena Holguin	Guard	5–8	Redshirt Sophomore	Las Cruces, New Mexico

== Schedule ==
Date time, TV	Rank^{#}	Opponent^{#}	Result	Record	Site (attendance) city, state
Exhibition
11/02/2013*; 6:00 pm		Western New Mexico	W 75–60	–	Pan American Center (400); Las Cruces, NM
Regular Season
11/12/2013*; 7:05 pm		at UTEP; The Battle of I-10	L 69–94	0–1	Don Haskins Center (1,505); El Paso, TX
11/14/2013*; 6:00 pm, Aggie Vision		Boise State	W 98–68	1–1	Pan American Center (352); Las Cruces, NM
11/16/2013*; 2:00 pm, LMUSN		at Loyola Marymount	L 64–81	1–2	Gersten Pavilion (670); Los Angeles, CA
11/18/2013*; 6:00 pm, BigWest.TV		at Cal Poly	L 64–72	1–3	Mott Gym (426); San Luis Obispo, CA
11/21/2013*; 1:00 pm		Eastern New Mexico	W 88–56	2–3	Pan American Center (172); Las Cruces, NM
11/29/2013*; 11:00 am		Northern Illinois; Aggie Hotel Encanto Thanksgiving Classic	W 77–73	3–3	Pan American Center (N/A); Las Cruces, NM
11/30/2013*; 1:00 pm		Milwaukee; Aggie Hotel Encanto Thanksgiving Classic	L 81–84	3–4	Pan American Center (247); Las Cruces, NM
12/03/2013*; 6:00 pm, Aggie Vision		UTEP; The Battle of I-10	L 61–80	3–5	Pan American Center (514); Las Cruces, NM
12/07/2013*; 7:00 pm, MW Net		at New Mexico; Rio Grande Rivalry	L 55–65	3–6	The Pit (6,392); Albuquerque, NM
12/18/2013*; 7:00 pm, BigWest.TV		at UC Irvine	L 52–75	3–7	Bren Events Center (299); Irvine, CA
12/23/2013*; 6:00 pm, BigWest.TV		at Cal State Fullerton	L 52–63	3–8	Titan Gym (220); Fullerton, CA
12/28/2013*; 11:00 am		vs. Northwestern State; UTSA Holiday Classic	L 63–73	3–9	Convocation Center (N/A); San Antonio, TX
12/29/2013*; 11:00 am		vs. UTSA; UTSA Holiday Classic	L 56–65	3–10	Convocation Center (491); San Antonio, TX
01/04/2014; 6:00 pm, Aggie Vision		Grand Canyon	W 66–63	4–10 (1–0)	Pan American Center (350); Las Cruces, NM
01/09/2014; 7:00 pm		at Seattle	L 51–61	4–11 (1–1)	Connolly Center (378); Seattle, WA
01/11/2014; 2:00 pm		at Idaho	L 51–79	4–12 (1–2)	Cowan Spectrum (415); Moscow, ID
01/16/2014; 6:00 pm, Aggie Vision		Chicago State	W 82–61	5–12 (2–2)	Pan American Center (942); Las Cruces, NM
01/18/2014; 6:00 pm, Aggie Vision		UMKC	W 106–77	6–12 (3–2)	Pan American Center (556); Las Cruces, NM
01/25/2014; 7:00 pm		at Texas–Pan American	L 61–66	6–13 (3–3)	UTPA Fieldhouse (432); Edinburg, TX
01/30/2014; 7:00 pm		at Cal State Bakersfield	L 63–86	6–14 (3–4)	Icardo Center (374); Bakersfield, CA
02/01/2014; 3:00 pm		at Utah Valley	W 83–78 ^{OT}	7–14 (4–4)	PE Building (317); Orem, UT
02/06/2014; 6:00 pm, Aggie Vision		Idaho	L 66–75	7–15 (4–5)	Pan American Center (487); Las Cruces, NM
02/08/2014; 6:00 pm, Aggie Vision		Seattle	W 86–81	8–15 (5–5)	Pan American Center (375); Las Cruces, NM
02/13/2014; 7:00 pm		at UMKC	L 84–92	8–16 (5–6)	Swinney Recreation Center (568); Kansas City, MO
02/15/2014; 2:00 pm		at Chicago State	W 74–64	9–16 (6–6)	Emil and Patricia Jones Convocation Center (230); Chicago, IL
02/20/2014; 6:00 pm, Aggie Vision		Texas–Pan American	W 83–71	10–16 (7–6)	Pan American Center (571); Las Cruces, NM
02/27/2014; 6:00 pm, Aggie Vision		Utah Valley	L 81–87	10–17 (7–7)	Pan American Center (410); Las Cruces, NM
03/01/2014; 6:00 pm		Cal State Bakersfield	L 90–96	10–18 (7–8)	Pan American Center (455); Las Cruces, NM
03/06/2014; 7:00 pm		at Grand Canyon	L 56–66	10–19 (7–9)	GCU Arena (563); Phoenix, AZ
2014 WAC women's basketball tournament
03/13/2014; 3:30 pm		vs. UT Pan American; Quarterfinals	W 86–74	11–19	Orleans Arena (563); Paradise, NV
03/14/2014; 1:00 pm		vs. Idaho; Semifinals	L 65–75	11–20	Orleans Arena (N/A); Paradise, NV
*Non-conference game. ^{#}Rankings from AP Poll. (#) Tournament seedings in parentheses. All times are in Mountain Time.

== See also ==
- 2013–14 New Mexico State Aggies men's basketball team
