= 2013–14 Grand Canyon Antelopes women's basketball team =

Intercollegiate basketball season

2013–14 Grand Canyon Antelopes women's basketball
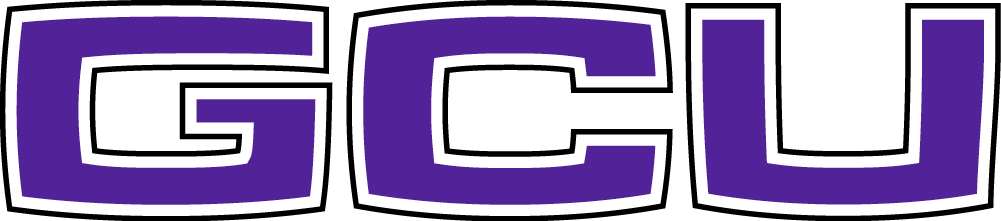

2014 North Texas Tournament Champions 2014 Warhawk Classic Champions
- Conference: Western Athletic Conference
- Record: 21–9 (10–6 WAC)
- Head coach: Trent May (7th season)
- Assistant coaches: Cory Cole (5th season); Erin Scholz (1st season); Milee Karre (3rd season)
- Home arena: GCU Arena

2013–14 WAC women's basketball standings
| | Conf. | | | | Overall |
| Team | W | | L | PCT | W | | L | PCT |
|---|---|---|---|---|---|---|---|---|
| Idaho† | 15 | – | 1 | .938 | 25 | – | 9 | .735 |
| Cal State Bakersfield | 12 | – | 4 | .750 | 19 | – | 12 | .613 |
| Grand Canyon* | 10 | – | 6 | .625 | 21 | – | 9 | .700 |
| Seattle U | 9 | – | 7 | .563 | 16 | – | 16 | .500 |
| Texas-Pan American | 8 | – | 8 | .500 | 14 | – | 16 | .467 |
| New Mexico State | 7 | – | 9 | .438 | 11 | – | 20 | .355 |
| UMKC | 7 | – | 9 | .438 | 11 | – | 19 | .367 |
| Utah Valley | 4 | – | 12 | .250 | 7 | – | 23 | .233 |
| Chicago State | 0 | – | 16 | .000 | 3 | – | 27 | .100 |
† 2014 WAC tournament winner As of March 22, 2014 * Grand Canyon ineligible for WAC Basketball Tournament as part of reclassification from Division II; Rankings from AP poll

The 2013–14 Grand Canyon Antelopes women's basketball team represented Grand Canyon University, during the 2013–14 college basketball season. It was head coach Trent May's seventh season at Grand Canyon. The Antelopes competed as new members of the Western Athletic Conference and played their home games at GCU Arena. This was year 1 of a four-year transition period from D2 to Division I. As a result, the Antelopes were classified as a D2 team for the 2013–14 season. The Antelopes weren't eligible to make the D1 or D2 basketball tournaments and did not participate in this season's WAC basketball tournament. However the Antelopes could have competed in the WNIT or WBI tournaments if they were invited. The Antelopes finished the season third in the WAC and were invited to participate in the WBI.

== Roster ==
2013–14 Grand Canyon Antelopes women's basketball team
Players
Coaches

| Pos. | # | Name | Height | Year | Previous school | Hometown |
|---|---|---|---|---|---|---|
| G | 1 | Justine Johnson | 5 ft 6 in (1.68 m) | Sr | Gilbert; Weber State | Mesa, AZ |
| G | 10 | August Touchard | 5 ft 6 in (1.68 m) | Fr | JSerra Catholic | Newport Beach, CA |
| G | 11 | Madison Craig | 5 ft 8 in (1.73 m) | So | Foothill; Ohlone College | Pleasanton, CA |
| G | 12 | Erica Paskell | 5 ft 10 in (1.78 m) | Sr | Grapevine; UT Arlington | Grapevine, TX |
| G | 15 | Courtney Haynes | 5 ft 6 in (1.68 m) | Jr | Centennial; Louisiana Tech | Las Vegas, NV |
| G | 20 | Kaitlyn Petersen | 5 ft 7 in (1.7 m) | Jr | Mission Viejo; Gonzaga; Cal State Northridge | Mission Viejo, CA |
| C | 22 | Jasmine Grayson | 6 ft 2 in (1.88 m) | Sr | Fairfax; Cal State Fullerton | Los Angeles, CA |
| G/F | 23 | Judy Jones | 5 ft 9 in (1.75 m) | Sr | Wossman; UT San Antonio | Monroe, LA |
| G | 24 | Astrea Reed | 5 ft 8 in (1.73 m) | Fr | Sandia | Albuquerque, NM |
| F | 32 | Johnna Brown | 6 ft 0 in (1.83 m) | Sr | Centennial; Dixie State | Las Vegas, NV |
| C | 40 | Tori Morris | 6 ft 2 in (1.88 m) | Fr | Bishop O'Connell | Herndon, VA |
| F | 44 | Jenna Pearson | 6 ft 0 in (1.83 m) | Sr | Gilbert Christian | Gilbert, AZ |
| F | 45 | Deanna Daniels | 5 ft 10 in (1.78 m) | Sr | Centennial; Dixie State; Pima CC | Las Vegas, NV |
| C | 50 | Asha McDonnell | 6 ft 4 in (1.93 m) | Sr | Serra; Salt Lake CC | San Diego, CA |

Head coach

- Trent May (Southern Nazarene)

Assistant coach(es)

- Cory Cole (Oklahoma Christian)
- Erin Scholz (Colorado)
- Milee Karre (Grand Canyon)

Legend

- (C) Team captain
- (S) Suspended
- (I) Ineligible
- (W) Walk-on
- Injured
- Current redshirt

== Schedule and results ==
| Date time, TV | Rank^{#} | Opponent^{#} | Result | Record | Site (attendance) city, state |
Exhibition
| November 2, 2013*; 2:00 pm | | Eastern New Mexico | W 65–44 | - | GCU Arena (N/A); Phoenix, AZ |
Regular season
| 11/09/2013*; 2:00 pm | | Western State | W 92–35 | 1–0 | GCU Arena (485); Phoenix, AZ |
| 11/19/2013*; 7:00 pm | | Western New Mexico | W 79–52 | 2–0 | GCU Arena (458); Phoenix, AZ |
| 11/23/2013*; 10:00 am | | vs. Bethune-Cookman; North Texas Tournament | W 57–45 | 3–0 | The Super Pit (43); Denton, TX |
| 11/24/2013*; 3:00 pm | | vs. Abilene Christian; North Texas Tournament | W 70–57 | 4–0 | The Super Pit (127); Denton, TX |
| 11/26/2013*; 4:00 pm | | at North Texas; North Texas Tournament | W 67–65 ^{OT} | 5–0 | The Super Pit (718); Denton, TX |
| 11/29/2013*; 4:00 pm | | vs. Mississippi St. Gulf Coast Showcase | L 62–71 | 5–1 | Germain Arena (N/A); Estero, FL |
| 11/30/2013*; 12:30 pm | | vs. UCLA; Gulf Coast Showcase | L 60–62 | 5–2 | Germain Arena (N/A); Estero, FL |
| 12/01/2013*; 7:30 am | | vs. Southeastern Louisiana; Gulf Coast Showcase | W 62–57 | 6–2 | Germain Arena (N/A); Estero, FL |
| 12/10/2013*; 12:00 pm, MW Net | | at Nevada | W 75–55 | 7–2 | Lawlor Events Center (4,307); Reno, NV |
| 12/13/2013*; 6:00 pm | | at Tulsa; Warhawk Classic | W 82–72 | 8–2 | Fant–Ewing Coliseum (828); Monroe, LA |
| 12/14/2013*; 6:00 pm | | vs. East Carolina; Warhawk Classic | W 86–76 | 9–2 | Fant–Ewing Coliseum (834); Monroe, LA |
| 12/23/2013*; 1:00 pm | | Hawaii | W 54–51 | 10–2 | GCU Arena (1,056); Phoenix, AZ |
| 12/28/2013*; 2:00 pm | | LIU Brooklyn | W 72–63 | 11–2 | GCU Arena (347); Phoenix, Az |
| 01/02/2014; 6:00 pm | | at Texas–Pan American | L 58–60 | 11–3 (0–1) | UTPA Fieldhouse (748); Edinburg, TX |
| 01/04/2014; 6:00 pm, ESPN3 | | at New Mexico State | L 63–66 | 11–4 (0–2) | Pan American Center (350); Las Cruces, NM |
| 01/09/2014; 7:00 pm | | Cal State Bakersfield | W 78–64 | 12–4 (1–2) | GCU Arena (517); Phoenix, AZ |
| 01/11/2014; 2:00 pm | | Utah Valley | W 88–51 | 13–4 (2–2) | GCU Arena (404); Phoenix, AZ |
| 01/23/2014; 7:00 pm | | at Idaho | L 54–58 | 13–5 (2–3) | Cowan Spectrum (623); Moscow, ID |
| 01/25/2014; 5:00 pm | | at Seattle | L 68–89 | 13–6 (2–4) | Connolly Center (358); Seattle, WA |
| 01/30/2014; 7:00 pm, Cox7 | | Chicago State | W 84–53 | 14–6 (3–4) | GCU Arena (581); Phoenix, AZ |
| 02/01/2014; 2:00 pm | | UMKC | W 74–63 | 15–6 (4–4) | GCU Arena (533); Phoenix, AZ |
| 02/06/2014; 7:00 pm | | at Utah Valley | W 66–63 | 16–6 (5–4) | UCCU Center (190); Orem, UT |
| 02/08/2014; 2:00 pm | | at Cal State Bakersfield | L 70–77 | 16–7 (5–5) | Icardo Center (345); Bakersfield, CA |
| 02/20/2014; 7:00 pm | | Seattle | W 72–66 | 17–7 (6–5) | GCU Arena (450); Phoenix, AZ |
| 02/22/2014; 2:00 pm | | Idaho | L 54–68 | 17–8 (6–6) | GCU Arena (304); Phoenix, AZ |
| 02/27/2014; 6:00 pm | | at UMKC | W 67–63 | 18–8 (7–6) | Swinney Recreation Center (549); Kansas City, MO |
| 03/01/2014; 1:00 pm | | at Chicago State | W 69–38 | 19–8 (8–6) | Emil and Patricia Jones Convocation Center (230); Chicago, IL |
| 03/06/2014; 7:00 pm | | New Mexico State | W 66–56 | 20–8 (9–6) | GCU Arena (563); Phoenix, AZ |
| 03/08/2014; 2:00 pm | | Texas-Pan American | W 77–55 | 21–8 (10–6) | GCU Arena (575); Phoenix, AZ |
2014 WBI
| 03/08/2014; 2:00 pm | | Boise State | L 51–52 | 21–9 | GCU Arena (276); Phoenix, AZ |
*Non-conference game. ^{#}Rankings from AP Poll. (#) Tournament seedings in parentheses. All times are in Mountain Standard Time.

== See also ==
2013–14 Grand Canyon Antelopes men's basketball team
