= 2013–14 Weber State Wildcats women's basketball team =

Intercollegiate basketball season

2013–14 Weber State Wildcats women's basketball
- Conference: Big Sky Conference
- Record: 7–22 (3–17 Big Sky)
- Head coach: Bethann Ord (2nd season)
- Assistant coaches: Penny Jones (2nd season); Devan Newman (2nd season); Brett Vana (1st season)
- Home arena: Dee Events Center

2013–14 Big Sky women's basketball standings
	Conf.				Overall
Team	W		L	PCT	W		L	PCT
North Dakota†	15	–	5	.750	22	–	10	.688
Southern Utah	15	–	5	.750	23	–	10	.697
Montana	14	–	6	.700	23	–	11	.676
Eastern Washington	12	–	8	.600	16	–	14	.533
Idaho State	11	–	9	.550	14	–	17	.452
Montana State	10	–	10	.500	15	–	15	.500
Sacramento State	10	–	10	.500	18	–	12	.600
Northern Colorado	8	–	12	.400	14	–	15	.483
Northern Arizona	6	–	14	.300	9	–	20	.310
Portland State	6	–	14	.300	8	–	21	.276
Weber State	3	–	17	.150	7	–	22	.241
† 2014 Big Sky tournament winner As of 10:03, 1 April 2014 (UTC); Rankings from AP poll

The 2013–14 Weber State Wildcats women's basketball team represented Weber State University during the 2013–14 NCAA Division I women's basketball season. The Wildcats were led by second year head coach Bethann Ord and played their home games at the Dee Events Center. They were members of the Big Sky Conference.

== Radio broadcasts ==
All Wildcats games will be heard on KWCR with Tyson Ewing and M Brandon Garside calling the action. All home games and conference road games will also be streamed with video live online through Watch Big Sky.

== Roster ==
2013–14 Weber State Wildcats women's basketball team
Players
Coaches

Pos.	#	Name	Height	Year	Previous school	Hometown
G	1	Laura Palmere	5 ft 11 in (1.8 m)	Sr	Mullen; Denver	Lakewood, CO
G	2	Deeshyra Thomas	5 ft 6 in (1.68 m)	Fr	Clackamas	Clasckamas, OR
F	3	Jalen Carpenter	6 ft 1 in (1.85 m)	So	Bremerton	Bremerton, WA
G	4	Elizabeth Mounier	5 ft 10 in (1.78 m)	Fr	Oak Christian	West Hills, CA
G	5	Brianna Averette	5 ft 5 in (1.65 m)	Jr	Central	Louisville, KY
G	11	Xojian Harry	5 ft 11 in (1.8 m)	Jr	Viewmont	Bountiful, UT
F	10	Ana Stankovic	6 ft 0 in (1.83 m)	So	Architectural Technical School, Belgrande	Serbia
C	12	Zakiyyah Shahid-Martin	6 ft 2 in (1.88 m)	Jr	DuPont Manual	Louisville, KY
G	14	Taysia Gray	5 ft 8 in (1.73 m)	So	Stafford Senior	Stafford, VA
G	15	Carlee Lough	5 ft 11 in (1.8 m)	Jr	Fairview	Boulder, CO
G	21	Desiree Ramos	5 ft 7 in (1.7 m)	So	Hunter	West Valley, UT
F	22	Kalie Matthews	6 ft 0 in (1.83 m)	RS So	Sandra Day O'Connor	Glendale, AZ
C	23	Tinisha Toussaint	6 ft 2 in (1.88 m)	RS So	Desert View	Phoeniz, AZ
F	25	Megan Tanner	5 ft 11 in (1.8 m)	RS Jr	Bonneville; College of Southern Idaho	South Ogden, UT
F	32	Amandah Hughes	5 ft 11 in (1.8 m)	Sr	Gateway	Aurora, CO
G	34	Regina Okoye	5 ft 10 in (1.78 m)	So	El Dorado	Albuquerque, NM

Head coach

- Bethann Ord (UMBC)

Assistant coach(es)

- Penny Jones (West Florida)
- Devan Newman (Louisville)
- Brett Vana (Lake Erie)

Legend

- (C) Team captain
- (S) Suspended
- (I) Ineligible
- (W) Walk-on
- Injured
- Current redshirt

Roster
Last update: 2013-10-11

== Schedule ==
Date time, TV	Opponent	Result	Record	Site (attendance) city, state
Exhibition
10/31/2013*; 4:00 pm, Watch Big Sky	Adams State	W 75–46	–	Dee Events Center (N/A); Ogden, UT
Regular Season
11/08/2013*; 3:00 pm, Watch Big Sky	Walla Walla	W 107–25	1–0	Dee Events Center (523); Ogden, UT
11/11/2013*; 5:00 pm, Watch Big Sky	Montana-Western	W 77–57	2–0	Dee Events Center (557); Ogden, UT
11/15/2013*; 5:00 pm	at Seton Hall	L 61–78	2–1	Prudential Center (553); South Orange, NJ
11/17/2013*; 11:00 am, Patriot League Network	at Army	L 51–57	2–2	Christl Arena (530); West Point, NY
11/26/2013*; 5:00 pm, Watch Big Sky	Air Force	W 81–69	3–2	Dee Events Center (1,373); Ogden, UT
12/01/2013*; 2:00 pm, USD TV	at San Diego	L 55–75	3–3	Jenny Craig Pavilion (312); San Diego, CA
12/07/2013*; 2:00 pm, Watch Big Sky	Utah Valley	W 79–64	4–3	Dee Events Center (575); Ogden, UT
12/10/2013*; 7:00 pm, Watch Big Sky	BYU	L 85–90	4–4	Dee Events Center (855); Ogden, UT
12/22/2013*; 2:00 pm, MW Net	at Colorado State	L 54–59	4–5	Moby Arena (985); Ft. Collins, CO
01/02/2014; 7:00 pm, Watch Big Sky	at Eastern Washington	L 67–78	4–6 (0–1)	Reese Court (335); Cheney, WA
01/04/2014; 1:00 pm, Watch Big Sky	at Portland State	L 60–66	4–7 (0–2)	Stott Center (471); Portland, OR
01/09/2014; 12:00 pm, Watch Big Sky	Northern Colorado	L 49–68	4–8 (0–3)	Dee Events Center (1,251); Ogden, UT
01/11/2014; 2:00 pm, Watch Big Sky	North Dakota	L 72–83	4–9 (0–4)	Dee Events Center (578); Ogden, UT
01/16/2014; 7:00 pm, Watch Big Sky	at Southern Utah	L 64–76	4–10 (0–5)	Centrum Arena (864); Cedar City, UT
01/20/2014; 7:00 pm, Watch Big Sky	at Idaho State	L 58–60	4–11 (0–6)	Reed Gym (1,139); Pocatello, ID
01/23/2014; 7:00 pm, Watch Big Sky	at Montana State	L 71–87	4–12 (0–7)	Worthington Arena (1,330); Bozeman, MT
01/25/2014; 2:00 pm, Watch Big Sky	at Montana	L 52–68	4–13 (0–8)	Dahlberg Arena (3,097); Missoula, MT
01/30/2014; 7:00 pm, Watch Big Sky	at Northern Arizona	L 87–96	4–14 (0–9)	Dee Events Center (624); Ogden, UT
02/01/2014; 2:00 pm, Watch Big Sky	Sacramento State	L 104–111	4–15 (0–10)	Dee Events Center (812); Ogden, UT
02/06/2014; 6:00 pm, Watch Big Sky	at North Dakota	L 55–68	4–16 (0–11)	Betty Engelstad Sioux Center (1,637); Grand Forks, ND
02/08/2014; 2:00 pm, Watch Big Sky	at Northern Colorado	L 63–70	4–17 (0–12)	Butler–Hancock Sports Pavilion (663); Greeley, CO
02/15/2014; 2:00 pm, Watch Big Sky	Southern Utah	L 64–80	4–18 (0–13)	Dee Events Center (720); Ogden, UT
02/17/2014; 7:00 pm, Watch Big Sky	Idaho State	W 84–71	5–18 (1–13)	Dee Events Center (615); Ogden, UT
02/20/2014; 7:00 pm, Watch Big Sky	Montana	W 56–54	6–18 (2–13)	Dee Events Center (657); Ogden, UT
02/22/2014; 2:00 pm, Watch Big Sky	Montana State	L 71–75	6–19 (2–14)	Dee Events Center (775); Ogden, UT
02/27/2014; 8:00 pm, Watch Big Sky	at Sacramento State	L 60–76	6–20 (2–15)	Colberg Court (573); Sacramento, CA
03/01/2014; 2:00 pm, Watch Big Sky	at Northern Arizona	W 74–73	7–20 (3–15)	Walkup Skydome (645); Flagstaff, AZ
03/06/2014; 7:00 pm, Watch Big Sky	Portland State	L 60–62	7–21 (3–16)	Dee Events Center (512); Ogden, UT
03/08/2014; 2:00 pm, Watch Big Sky	Eastern Washington	L 60–68	7–22 (3–17)	Dee Events Center (622); Ogden, UT
*Non-conference game. ^{#}Rankings from AP Poll. (#) Tournament seedings in parentheses. All times are in Mountain Time.

== See also ==
- 2013–14 Weber State Wildcats men's basketball team
