= 2013–14 Texas–Pan American Broncs women's basketball team =

Intercollegiate basketball season

2013–14 Texas–Pan American Broncs women's basketball
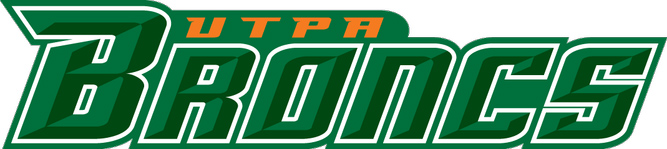
- Conference: Western Athletic Conference
- Record: 14–16 (8–8 WAC)
- Head coach: Larry Tidwell (1st season)
- Assistant coaches: John Ishee (1st season); Anthony Anderson (1st season); Hannah Burleson (1st season)
- Home arena: UTPA Fieldhouse

2013–14 WAC women's basketball standings
	Conf.				Overall
Team	W		L	PCT	W		L	PCT
Idaho†	15	–	1	.938	25	–	9	.735
Cal State Bakersfield	12	–	4	.750	19	–	12	.613
Grand Canyon*	10	–	6	.625	21	–	9	.700
Seattle U	9	–	7	.563	16	–	16	.500
Texas-Pan American	8	–	8	.500	14	–	16	.467
New Mexico State	7	–	9	.438	11	–	20	.355
UMKC	7	–	9	.438	11	–	19	.367
Utah Valley	4	–	12	.250	7	–	23	.233
Chicago State	0	–	16	.000	3	–	27	.100
† 2014 WAC tournament winner As of March 22, 2014 * Grand Canyon ineligible for WAC Basketball Tournament as part of reclassification from Division II; Rankings from AP poll

The 2013–14 Texas–Pan American Broncs women's basketball team represented the University of Texas–Pan American during the 2013–14 NCAA Division I women's basketball season. It was head coach Larry Tidwell's first season at UTPA. The Broncs played their home games at the UTPA Fieldhouse and were new members of the Western Athletic Conference. The Broncs would finish the season as the 4-seed in the WAC Tournament and finish the year 14–16 overall.

== Roster ==
2013–14 UTPA Broncs women's basketball team
Players
Coaches

Pos.	#	Name	Height	Year	Previous school	Hometown
G/F	1	Jasmine Thompson	5 ft 8 in (1.73 m)	Jr	Bronzeville Scholastic	Chicago, IL
G	2	Alexandria Hill	5 ft 7 in (1.7 m)	So	Bolingbrook	Plainfield, IL
G	3	Tonisha Walker	5 ft 6 in (1.68 m)	Jr	Gardner Edgerton; Cowley County CC	Gardner, KS
F	5	Micheline Mercelita	5 ft 11 in (1.8 m)	Fr	Edinburg	Edinburg, TX
F	10	Brianna Sifford	5 ft 9 in (1.75 m)	Jr	DeSoto; Western Texas	DeSoto, TX
G	11	Shawnte' Goff	5 ft 8 in (1.73 m)	Fr	Copperas Cove	Copperas Cove, TX
G/F	12	Alyssa Sanchez	5 ft 5 in (1.65 m)	Fr	Hidalgo	Hidalgo, TX
G	14	T'Ondria Nolen	5 ft 7 in (1.7 m)	Jr	Wichita Northwest; Cowley County CC	Wichita, KS
G	15	KaeLynn Boyd	5 ft 5 in (1.65 m)	So	Hahnville	Boutte, LA
F	20	Cherrell Price	5 ft 11 in (1.8 m)	Jr	Carl Albert; Seminole State	Midwest City, OK
F	21	Brittany Bush	6 ft 1 in (1.85 m)	Jr	Moline; Cowley County CC	Moline, IL
G/F	22	Jada Bennett	5 ft 10 in (1.78 m)	RS So	Sherman; North Florida	Sherman, TX
G	23	LeQuita Garner	5 ft 7 in (1.7 m)	Sr	Whitney Young Magnet	Chicago, IL
G	24	Rickell Preston	5 ft 10 in (1.78 m)	So	Hidelberg; Hahnville	Killona, LA
F	25	Cha'zaye Wright	5 ft 8 in (1.73 m)	Jr	DeSoto; McLennan CC	DeSoto, TX
F/C	32	Taylor Cyphers	6 ft 2 in (1.88 m)	So	Wichita Heights	Wichita, KS
G	33	Emily Azubell	5 ft 9 in (1.75 m)	Fr	Robert Vela	Edinburg, TX
F	40	Khiani Clark	5 ft 10 in (1.78 m)	Fr	Round Rock Westwood	Austin, TX

Head coach

- Larry Tidwell (Austin College)

Assistant coach(es)

- John Ishee (Southern Miss)
- Anthony Anderson (FIU)
- Hannah Burleson (Texas A&M–Corpus Christi)

Legend

- (C) Team captain
- (S) Suspended
- (I) Ineligible
- (W) Walk-on
- Injured
- Current redshirt

== Schedule and results ==
Date time, TV	Opponent	Result	Record	Site (attendance) city, state
Regular Season
11/08/2013*; 5:00 pm	Schreiner	W 87–46	1–0	UTPA Fieldhouse (918); Edinburg, TX
11/10/2013*; 4:00 pm, FSSW/FCS Central	at Texas Tech	L 48–70	1–1	United Spirit Arena (3,400); Lubbock, TX
11/19/2013*; 7:00 pm	Texas Lutheran	W 80–37	2–1	UTPA Fieldhouse (682); Edinburg, TX
11/21/2013*; 7:00 pm	VCU	L 57–67	2–2	UTPA Fieldhouse (443); Edinburg, TX
11/29/2013*; 6:00 pm	vs. Norfolk State; UTSA Classic	W 50–36	3–2	Convocation Center (377); San Antonio, TX
11/30/2013*; 10:00 pm	vs. Northern Iowa; UTSA Classic	W 70–47	4–2	Convocation Center (275); San Antonio, TX
12/03/2013*; 5:30 pm, LSN	at Houston Baptist	W 76–74	5–2	Sharp Gymnasium (290); Houston, TX
12/08/2013*; 2:00 pm	at Texas A&M–Corpus Christi	L 54–68	5–3	American Bank Center (1,348); Corpus Christi, TX
12/15/2013*; 4:00 pm, FSSW	at TCU	L 47–73	5–4	Daniel–Meyer Coliseum (1,844); Ft. Worth, TX
12/18/2013*; 7:00 pm	UT Arlington	W 75–63	6–4	UTPA Fieldhouse (723); Edinburg, TX
12/21/2013*; 1:00 pm	vs. Nebraska–Omaha; Wichita State Winter Classic	L 61–73	6–5	Charles Koch Arena (1,321); Wichita, KS
12/22/2013*; 2:30 pm	at Wichita State; Wichita State Winter Classic	L 40–69	6–6	Charles Koch Arena (1,337); Wichita, KS
12/29/2013*; 2:00 pm	at No. 11 Oklahoma State	L 48–90	6–7	Gallagher-Iba Arena (2,706); Stillwater, OK
01/02/2014; 7:00 pm	Grand Canyon	W 60–58	7–7 (1–0)	UTPA Fieldhouse (748); Edinburg, TX
01/09/2014; 8:00 pm	at Idaho	L 65–76	7–8 (1–1)	Cowan Spectrum (405); Moscow, ID
01/11/2014; 6:00 pm	at Seattle	L 62–84	7–9 (1–2)	Connolly Center (148); Seattle, WA
01/16/2014; 7:00 pm	UMKC	W 65–50	8–9 (2–2)	UTPA Fieldhouse (302); Edinburg, TX
01/18/2014; 7:00 pm	Chicago State	W 66–44	9–9 (3–2)	UTPA Fieldhouse (382); Edinburg, TX
01/25/2014; 7:00 pm	New Mexico State	W 66–61	10–9 (4–2)	UTPA Fieldhouse (432); Edinburg, TX
01/30/2014; 8:00 pm	at Utah Valley	W 64–54	11–9 (5–2)	UCCU Center (138); Orem, UT
02/01/2014; 3:00 pm	at Cal State Bakersfield	L 74–82	11–10 (5–3)	Icardo Center (325); Bakersfield, CA
02/06/2014; 7:00 pm	Seattle	L 68–75 ^{OT}	11–11 (5–4)	UTPA Fieldhouse (324); Edinburg, TX
02/08/2014; 9:00 pm	Idaho	L 52–85	11–12 (5–5)	UTPA Fieldhouse (404); Edinburg, TX
02/13/2014; 7:00 pm	at Chicago State	W 75–52	12–12 (6–5)	Emil and Patricia Jones Convocation Center (207); Chicago, IL
02/15/2014; 2:00 pm	at UMKC	L 84–87	12–13 (6–6)	Swinney Recreation Center (826); Kansas City, MO
02/20/2014; 7:00 pm, ESPN3	at New Mexico State	L 71–83	12–14 (6–7)	Pan American Center (571); Las Cruces, NM
02/27/2014; 7:00 pm	Cal State Bakersfield	W 84–62	13–14 (7–7)	UTPA Fieldhouse (487); Edinburg, TX
03/01/2014; 7:00 pm	Utah Valley	W 55–46	14–14 (8–7)	UTPA Fieldhouse (398); Edinburg, TX
03/08/2014; 3:00 pm	at Grand Canyon	L 55–75	14–15 (8–8)	GCU Arena (575); Phoenix, AZ
2014 WAC tournament
03/12/2014; 4:30 pm	vs. New Mexico State; Quarterfinals	L 74–86	14–16	Orleans Arena (563); Paradise, NV
*Non-conference game. ^{#}Rankings from AP Poll. (#) Tournament seedings in parentheses. All times are in Central.

== See also ==
2013–14 Texas–Pan American Broncs men's basketball team
