= 2013–14 Eastern Washington Eagles women's basketball team =

Intercollegiate basketball season

2013–14 Eastern Washington Eagles women's basketball
- Conference: Big Sky Conference
- Record: 16–14 (12–8 Big Sky)
- Head coach: Wendy Schuller (13th season)
- Assistant coaches: Steve Lowe (3rd season); Jessica Huntington (2nd season)
- Home arena: Reese Court

2013–14 Big Sky women's basketball standings
	Conf.				Overall
Team	W		L	PCT	W		L	PCT
North Dakota†	15	–	5	.750	22	–	10	.688
Southern Utah	15	–	5	.750	23	–	10	.697
Montana	14	–	6	.700	23	–	11	.676
Eastern Washington	12	–	8	.600	16	–	14	.533
Idaho State	11	–	9	.550	14	–	17	.452
Montana State	10	–	10	.500	15	–	15	.500
Sacramento State	10	–	10	.500	18	–	12	.600
Northern Colorado	8	–	12	.400	14	–	15	.483
Northern Arizona	6	–	14	.300	9	–	20	.310
Portland State	6	–	14	.300	8	–	21	.276
Weber State	3	–	17	.150	7	–	22	.241
† 2014 Big Sky tournament winner As of 10:03, 1 April 2014 (UTC); Rankings from AP poll

The 2013–14 Eastern Washington Eagles women's basketball team represented Eastern Washington University during the 2013–14 NCAA Division I women's basketball season. The Eagles, were led by thirteenth year head coach Wendy Schuller and played their home games at Reese Court. They were members of the Big Sky Conference. They finished the season 16–14, 12–8 in Big Sky for a finish in fourth place. They lost in the quarterfinals of the 2014 Big Sky Conference women's basketball tournament to Idaho State.

== Roster ==
Number	Name	Position	Height	Year	Hometown
4	Kylie Huerta	Guard	5–1	Junior	Covington, Washington
11	Cece Pearl	Forward	5–11	Redshirt Freshman	Peoria, Arizona
12	Hanna Mack	Center	6–4	Sophomore	Eugene, Oregon
13	Lexie Nelson	Guard	5–6	Redshirt Junior	Butte, Montana
20	Tisha Phillips	Guard	5–9	Redshirt Freshman	Lapwai, Idaho
22	Kayleigh Ryan	Guard/Forward	5–10	Redshirt Sophomore	Lynden, Washington
24	Miranda Mielke	Guard	5–5	Sophomore	Davenport, Washington
25	Hayley Hodgins	Guard	5–10	Redshirt Sophomore	Pasco, Washington
32	Aubrey Ashenfelter	Guard	6–0	Senior	Portland, Oregon
33	Marly Anderson	Center	6–2	Freshman	Portland, Oregon
34	Jade Redmon	Guard	5–7	Freshman	Spokane, Washington
35	Haley Shaner	Forward	5–11	Freshman	Sacramento, California
42	Melissa Williams	Forward	6–1	Junior	Camas, Washington
54	Laura Hughes	Center	6–2	Senior	West Richland, Washington
55	Bethany Montgomery	Guard	5–9	Freshman	Tacoma, Washington

== Schedule ==
Date time, TV	Opponent	Result	Record	Site (attendance) city, state
Regular season
11/01/2013*; 6:00 pm, Watch Big Sky	Master's College	W 87–74	-	Reese Court (387); Cheney, WA
Regular season
11/08/2013*; 5:15 pm, Pilots TV	at Portland	L 65–68	0–1	Chiles Center (302); Portland, OR
11/16/2013*; 1:00 pm, Watch Big Sky	SMU	L 70–75	0–2	Reese Court (604); Cheney, WA
11/20/2013*; 6:00 pm, SWX	at No. 24 Gonzaga	L 58–78	0–3	McCarthey Athletic Center (5,375); Spokane, WA
11/29/2013*; 7:30 pm	vs. Iowa State; South Point Shootout	L 60–88	0–4	South Point Arena (N/A); Paradise, NV
11/30/2013*; 5:00 pm	vs. Butler; South Point Shootout	L 51–74	0–5	South Point Arena (N/A); Paradise, NV
12/06/2013*; 6:00 pm, Watch Big Sky	Cal State Northridge	W 73–53	1–5	Reese Court (628); Cheney, WA
12/14/2013*; 2:00 pm, Watch Big Sky	Idaho	W 85–84	2–5	Reese Court (635); Cheney, WA
12/17/2013*; 6:00 pm, Watch Big Sky	Northwest University	W 90–48	3–5	Reese Court (442); Cheney, WA
12/21/2013*; 2:00 pm, Watch Big Sky	Boise State	W 81–66	4–5	Reese Court (321); Cheney, WA
12/29/2013; 2:00 pm, Watch Big Sky	Portland State	L 74–86	4–6 (0–1)	Reese Court (329); Cheney, WA
01/02/2014; 6:00 pm, Watch Big Sky	Weber State	W 78–67	5–6 (1–1)	Reese Court (335); Cheney, WA
01/04/2014; 2:00 pm, Watch Big Sky	Idaho State	W 67–55	6–6 (2–1)	Reese Court (438); Cheney, WA
01/09/2014; 6:00 pm, Watch Big Sky	at Montana	L 64–81	6–7 (2–2)	Dahlberg Arena (3,113); Missoula, MT
01/11/2014; 1:00 pm, Watch Big Sky	at Montana State	L 74–78	6–8 (2–3)	Worthington Arena (1,436); Bozeman, MT
01/16/2014; 6:00 pm, Watch Big Sky	Northern Arizona	W 92–68	7–8 (3–3)	Reese Court (687); Cheney, WA
01/18/2014; 2:00 pm, Watch Big Sky	Sacramento State	W 78–65	8–8 (4–3)	Reese Court (708); Cheney, WA
01/25/2014; 1:00 pm, Watch Big Sky	at Southern Utah	L 61–62	8–9 (4–4)	Centrum Arena (445); Cedar City, UT
01/30/2014; 5:00 pm, Watch Big Sky	at North Dakota	L 60–82	8–10 (4–5)	Betty Engelstad Sioux Center (1,401); Grand Forks, ND
02/01/2014; 1:00 pm, Watch Big Sky	at Northern Colorado	W 52–51	9–10 (5–5)	Butler–Hancock Sports Pavilion (685); Greeley, CO
02/06/2014; 6:00 pm, Watch Big Sky	Montana State	W 81–66	10–10 (6–5)	Reese Court (693); Cheney, WA
02/08/2014; 2:00 pm, Watch Big Sky	Montana	W 71–61	11–10 (7–5)	Reese Court (1,118); Cheney, WA
02/13/2014; 7:00 pm, Watch Big Sky	at Sacramento State	W 79–73	12–10 (8–5)	Colberg Court (423); Sacramento, CA
02/15/2014; 5:30 pm, Watch Big Sky	at Northern Arizona	L 78–86	12–11 (8–6)	Walkup Skydome (612); Flagstaff, AZ
02/20/2014; 6:00 pm, Watch Big Sky	Southern Utah	W 59–54	13–11 (9–6)	Reese Court (463); Cheney, WA
02/24/2014; 7:00 pm, Watch Big Sky	at Portland State	W 61–60	14–11 (10–6)	Stott Center (465); Portland, OR
02/27/2014; 6:00 pm, Watch Big Sky	Northern Colorado	W 61–60	15–11 (11–6)	Reese Court (465); Cheney, WA
03/01/2014; 2:00 pm, Watch Big Sky	North Dakota	L 57–61	15–12 (11–7)	Reese Court (603); Cheney, WA
03/06/2014; 7:00 pm, Watch Big Sky	at Idaho State	L 62–86	15–13 (11–8)	Reed Gym (1,050); Pocatello, ID
03/08/2014; 1:00 pm, Watch Big Sky	at Weber State	W 68–60	16–13 (12–8)	Dee Events Center (622); Ogden, UT
Big Sky Women's tournament
03/13/2014; 5:30 pm, Watch Big Sky	vs. Idaho State; Quarterfinals	L 65–70 ^{OT}	16–14	Betty Engelstad Sioux Center (977); Grand Forks, ND
*Non-conference game. ^{#}Rankings from AP Poll. (#) Tournament seedings in parentheses. All times are in Pacific Time.

== See also ==
2013–14 Eastern Washington Eagles men's basketball team
