= 2013–14 UMKC Kangaroos women's basketball team =

Intercollegiate basketball season

2013–14 UMKC Kangaroos women's basketball
- Conference: Western Athletic Conference
- Record: 11–19 (7–9 WAC)
- Head coach: Marsha Frese (2nd season)
- Assistant coaches: Shannon Baugh (1st season); Meredith Doyle (3rd season); Danielle Gratton (2nd season)
- Home arena: Swinney Recreation Center

2013–14 WAC women's basketball standings
	Conf.				Overall
Team	W		L	PCT	W		L	PCT
Idaho†	15	–	1	.938	25	–	9	.735
Cal State Bakersfield	12	–	4	.750	19	–	12	.613
Grand Canyon*	10	–	6	.625	21	–	9	.700
Seattle U	9	–	7	.563	16	–	16	.500
Texas-Pan American	8	–	8	.500	14	–	16	.467
New Mexico State	7	–	9	.438	11	–	20	.355
UMKC	7	–	9	.438	11	–	19	.367
Utah Valley	4	–	12	.250	7	–	23	.233
Chicago State	0	–	16	.000	3	–	27	.100
† 2014 WAC tournament winner As of March 22, 2014 * Grand Canyon ineligible for WAC Basketball Tournament as part of reclassification from Division II; Rankings from AP poll

The 2013–14 UMKC Kangaroos women's basketball team represented the University of Missouri–Kansas City during the 2013–14 NCAA Division I women's basketball season. The Kangaroos were led by coach Marsha Frese. They played their home games at the Swinney Recreation Center. UMKC entered the season as new members of the Western Athletic Conference and finished in sixth place in the conference.

== Roster ==
Number	Name	Position	Height	Year	Hometown
1	Kim Nezianya	Forward	6–0	Redshirt Senior	Carrollton, Texas
2	Audrey Thrasher	Forward	5–11	Junior	Macon, Missouri
4	Kelsey Barnwell	Guard	5–8	Sophomore	Kansas, Oklahoma
11	Justice Collins	Guard	5–8	Freshman	Springfield, Illinois
12	Lexis Hardiek	Guard	5–7	Junior	Hill City, Kansas
13	Taylor Leathers	Forward	6–0	Sophomore	Overland Park, Kansas
15	Eilise O'Connor	Guard	5–8	Senior	San Francisco, California
20	Calli White	Guard	5–7	Freshman	Fort Smith, Arkansas
21	Grace Mitchell	Forward	6–1	Freshman	Plano, Texas
23	Lauren Dudding	Guard	5–9	Sophomore	Lubbock, Texas
24	Taylor Strickland	Forward	6–0	Freshman	Springdale, Arkansas
34	Hailey Houser	Center	6–3	Senior	Kansas City, Missouri
42	Jordan Evans	Forward	6–2	Sophomore	Tulsa, Oklahoma

== Schedule ==
Date time, TV	Opponent	Result	Record	Site (attendance) city, state
Exhibition
11/02/2013*; 2:00 pm	Rockhurst	W 95–69	–	Swinney Recreation Center (627); Kansas City, MO
Regular Season
11/09/2013*; 7:30 pm	at North Texas	L 70–77	0–1	The Super Pit (374); Denton, TX
11/14/2013*; 6:30 pm	at Southeast Missouri State	L 74–76	0–2	Show Me Center (513); Cape Girardeau, MO
11/16/2013*; 4:00 pm	at SIU Edwardsville	L 76–79	0–3	Vadalabene Center (N/A); Edwardsville, IL
11/20/2013*; 7:00 pm, KSMO	Toledo	L 81–96	0–4	Swinney Recreation Center (761); Kansas City, MO
11/26/2013*; 7:00 pm	at Missouri	L 69–78	0–5	Mizzou Arena (1,228); Columbia, MO
11/29/2013*; 1:00 pm	Sam Houston State; Plaza Lights Classic	L 76–78	0–6	Swinney Recreation Center (257); Kansas City, MO
11/30/2013*; 3:30 pm	Eastern Illinois; Plaza Lights Classic	W 69–62	1–6	Swinney Recreation Center (189); Kansas City, MO
12/04/2013*; 6:00 pm	Maryville	W 83–79	2–6	Swinney Recreation Center (N/A); Kansas City, MO
12/07/2013*; 11:00 am	at Eastern Michigan	L 66–75	2–7	EMU Convocation Center (185); Ypsilanti, MI
12/15/2013*; 1:00 pm, KSMO	Texas Southern	W 80–79	3–7	Swinney Recreation Center (455); Kansas City, MO
12/18/2013*; 9:00 pm	at San Francisco	W 70–62	4–7	War Memorial Gymnasium (583); San Francisco, CA
12/21/2013*; 4:00 pm	at San Jose State	L 76–81	4–8	San Jose State Event Center (1,388); San Jose, CA
12/29/2013*; 2:00 pm	Western Illinois	L 74–80	4–9	Swinney Recreation Center (591); Kansas City, MO
01/02/2014; 7:00 pm	Idaho	L 64–81	4–10 (0–1)	Swinney Recreation Center (609); Kansas City, MO
01/04/2014; 2:00 pm	Seattle	W 77–65	5–10 (1–1)	Swinney Recreation Center (329); Kansas City, MO
01/11/2014; 2:00 pm	Chicago State	W 83–60	6–10 (2–1)	Municipal Auditorium (380); Kansas City, MO
01/16/2014; 7:00 pm	at Texas–Pan American	L 50–65	6–11 (2–2)	UTPA Fieldhouse (302); Edinburg, TX
01/18/2014; 7:00 pm, ESPN3	at New Mexico State	L 77–106	6–12 (2–3)	Pan American Center (556); Las Cruces, NM
01/23/2014; 7:00 pm	Utah Valley	W 83–66	7–12 (3–3)	Swinney Recreation Center (359); Kansas City, MO
01/25/2014; 2:00 pm	Cal State Bakersfield	L 80–87	7–13 (3–4)	Swinney Recreation Center (696); Kansas City, MO
02/01/2014; 2:00 pm	Grand Canyon	L 63–74	7–14 (3–5)	GCU Arena (533); Phoenix, AZ
02/08/2014; 2:00 pm	at Chicago State	W 84–52	8–14 (4–5)	Emil and Patricia Jones Convocation Center (201); Chicago, IL
02/13/2014; 7:00 pm	New Mexico State	W 94–82	9–14 (5–5)	Swinney Recreation Center (568); Kansas City, MO
02/15/2014; 2:00 pm	Texas–Pan American	W 87–84	10–14 (6–5)	Swinney Recreation Center (826); Kansas City, MO
02/20/2014; 9:00 pm	at Cal State Bakersfield	L 91–97	10–15 (6–6)	Icardo Center (275); Bakersfield, CA
02/22/2014; 4:00 pm	at Utah Valley	L 43–49	10–16 (6–7)	UCCU Center (322); Orem, UT
02/27/2014; 7:00 pm	Grand Canyon	L 63–67	10–17 (6–8)	Swinney Recreation Center (549); Kansas City, MO
03/06/2014; 9:00 pm	at Seattle	W 73–71 ^{OT}	11–17 (7–8)	Connolly Center (262); Seattle, WA
03/08/2014; 3:00 pm	at Idaho	L 63–70	11–18 (7–9)	Cowan Spectrum (751); Moscow, ID
2014 WAC women's basketball tournament
03/12/2014; 8:00 pm	vs. Quarterfinals	L 76–81	11–19	Orleans Arena (N/A); Paradise, NV
*Non-conference game. ^{#}Rankings from AP Poll. (#) Tournament seedings in parentheses. All times are in Central Time.

== See also ==
2013–14 UMKC Kangaroos men's basketball team
