= 2014 Big Sky Conference women's basketball tournament =

- Classification: Division I
- Season: 2013–14
- Teams: 7
- Site: Betty Engelstad Sioux Center; Grand Forks, ND
- Champions: North Dakota (1st Big Sky title)

2013–14 Big Sky women's basketball standings
	Conf.				Overall
Team	W		L	PCT	W		L	PCT
North Dakota†	15	–	5	.750	22	–	10	.688
Southern Utah	15	–	5	.750	23	–	10	.697
Montana	14	–	6	.700	23	–	11	.676
Eastern Washington	12	–	8	.600	16	–	14	.533
Idaho State	11	–	9	.550	14	–	17	.452
Montana State	10	–	10	.500	15	–	15	.500
Sacramento State	10	–	10	.500	18	–	12	.600
Northern Colorado	8	–	12	.400	14	–	15	.483
Northern Arizona	6	–	14	.300	9	–	20	.310
Portland State	6	–	14	.300	8	–	21	.276
Weber State	3	–	17	.150	7	–	22	.241
† 2014 Big Sky tournament winner As of 10:03, 1 April 2014 (UTC); Rankings from AP poll

The 2014 Big Sky Conference women's basketball tournament ran from March 14 to 16, 2014. The champion of the tournament will receive an automatic bid to the 2014 NCAA tournament.

== Format ==
Unlike most Division I conference tournaments in basketball, the Big Sky tournament does not involve all of the conference's teams. With the addition of North Dakota and Southern Utah to the conference for the 2012–13 season, expanding the number of teams from 9 to 11, the tournament expanded from six teams to seven. As in previous years, qualifying is based on overall conference record. The number of teams that fail to qualify also increased by one, going from three to four. All tournament games will be played at the site of the regular-season champion. The women's tournament remains with a Thursday-Friday-Saturday format. The field will be re-seeded after the first round so the #1 seed played will play the lowest remaining seed, while the highest remaining seeds will face off in the other semifinal.

== Bracket ==
Quarterfinals; Thursday, March 13
4	Eastern Washington	65
5	Idaho State	70
2	Southern Utah	86
7	Sacramento State	78
3	Montana	75
6	Montana State	66

Semifinals (re-seeded); Friday, March 14
1	North Dakota	78
5	Idaho State	53
2	Southern Utah	69
3	Montana	73

Championship; Saturday, March 15
1	North Dakota	72
3	Montana	55
