= 2014 WAC women's basketball tournament =

2014 Western Athletic Conference women's basketball tournament
- Classification: Division I
- Season: 2013–14
- Teams: 8
- Television: ESPNU

2013–14 WAC women's basketball standings
	Conf.				Overall
Team	W		L	PCT	W		L	PCT
Idaho†	15	–	1	.938	25	–	9	.735
Cal State Bakersfield	12	–	4	.750	19	–	12	.613
Grand Canyon*	10	–	6	.625	21	–	9	.700
Seattle U	9	–	7	.563	16	–	16	.500
Texas-Pan American	8	–	8	.500	14	–	16	.467
New Mexico State	7	–	9	.438	11	–	20	.355
UMKC	7	–	9	.438	11	–	19	.367
Utah Valley	4	–	12	.250	7	–	23	.233
Chicago State	0	–	16	.000	3	–	27	.100
† 2014 WAC tournament winner As of March 22, 2014 * Grand Canyon ineligible for WAC Basketball Tournament as part of reclassification from Division II; Rankings from AP poll

The 2014 WAC women's basketball tournament was held on March 12–15, 2014, at the Orleans Arena in Paradise, Nevada. This was the third consecutive year the WAC Tournament took place in Vegas.

== Format ==
Grand Canyon did not compete in the 2014 men's basketball tournament. As a D2 to D1 transitioning school, they were ineligible to compete in the NCAA tournament until the 2018 season. They could not win the conference tournament since the winner gets an automatic bid to the NCAA Tournament. However, Grand Canyon would be eligible to win the regular season title and was eligible to compete in the WNIT or WBI should they be invited.
8 teams competed in the 2014 tournament in a traditional single-elimination style tournament, with 1 playing 8, 2 playing 7, 3 playing 6, and 4 playing 5 on Wednesday, March 12. The winners met in the semifinals on Friday, March 14. The championship aired Saturday, March 15.

== Seeds ==
2014 WAC Women's Basketball Tournament seeds
Seed	School	Conference Record	Overall Record (End of Regular season)	Tiebreaker
1.	Idaho	15-1	22-8	
2.	Cal State Bakersfield	12-4	17-10	
3.	Seattle	9-7	14-15	
4.	UT Pan American	8-8	14-15	
5.	New Mexico State	7-9	10-19	1-1 vs. Grand Canyon
6.	UMKC	7-9	11-18	0-2 vs. Grand Canyon
7.	Utah Valley	4-12	7-22	
8.	Chicago State	0-16	3-26	

== Schedule ==
Session	Game	Time*	Matchup^{#}
Quarterfinals – Wednesday, March 13
1	1	12:00 PM	#1 Idaho vs. #8 Chicago State
1	2	2:30 PM	#4 UT Pan American vs. #5 New Mexico State
2	3	6:00 PM	#3 Seattle vs. #6 UMKC
2	4	8:30 PM	#2 Cal State Bakersfield vs. #7 Utah Valley
Semifinals – Friday, March 14
3	5	12:00 PM	#1 Idaho vs. #5 New Mexico State
3	6	2:30 PM	#3 Seattle vs. #2 Cal State Bakersfield
Championship Game – Saturday, March 15
4	8	1:00 PM	#1 Idaho vs. Game 6 winner
*Game Times in PT. #-Rankings denote tournament seeding.

== Bracket ==
Quarterfinals; Wednesday, March 13
1	Idaho	84
8	Chicago State	43
4	UT Pan American	74
5	New Mexico State	86
2	Cal State Bakersfield	65
7	Utah Valley	63
3	Seattle	81
6	UMKC	76

Semifinals; Friday, March 14
1	Idaho	75
5	New Mexico State	65
2	Cal State Bakersfield	79
3	Seattle	84

Championship; Saturday, March 15
1	Idaho	75
3	Seattle	67

== Game summaries ==
Game Summaries will be added once the tournament bracket is finalized.

== All tournament conference team ==
Name	School	Pos.	Year	Ht.	Hometown
