= 2013–14 Montana Lady Griz basketball team =

Intercollegiate basketball season

2013–14 Montana Lady Griz basketball

Lady Griz Classic Champions

WNIT, Second Round
- Conference: Big Sky Conference
- Record: 23–11 (14–6 Big Sky)
- Head coach: Robin Selvig (36th season)
- Assistant coaches: Shannon Schweyen (22nd season); Trish Duce (20th season); Sonya Rogers (1st season)
- Home arena: Dahlberg Arena

2013–14 Big Sky women's basketball standings
| | Conf. | | | | Overall |
| Team | W | | L | PCT | W | | L | PCT |
|---|---|---|---|---|---|---|---|---|
| North Dakota† | 15 | – | 5 | .750 | 22 | – | 10 | .688 |
| Southern Utah | 15 | – | 5 | .750 | 23 | – | 10 | .697 |
| Montana | 14 | – | 6 | .700 | 23 | – | 11 | .676 |
| Eastern Washington | 12 | – | 8 | .600 | 16 | – | 14 | .533 |
| Idaho State | 11 | – | 9 | .550 | 14 | – | 17 | .452 |
| Montana State | 10 | – | 10 | .500 | 15 | – | 15 | .500 |
| Sacramento State | 10 | – | 10 | .500 | 18 | – | 12 | .600 |
| Northern Colorado | 8 | – | 12 | .400 | 14 | – | 15 | .483 |
| Northern Arizona | 6 | – | 14 | .300 | 9 | – | 20 | .310 |
| Portland State | 6 | – | 14 | .300 | 8 | – | 21 | .276 |
| Weber State | 3 | – | 17 | .150 | 7 | – | 22 | .241 |
† 2014 Big Sky tournament winner As of 10:03, 1 April 2014 (UTC); Rankings from AP poll

The 2013–14 Montana Lady Griz basketball team represented the University of Montana during the 2013–14 NCAA Division I women's basketball season. The Lady Griz, led by thirty-sixth year head coach Robin Selvig, played their home games at Dahlberg Arena and were members of the Big Sky Conference. They finished the season 23–11, 14–6 in Big Sky play to finish in third place. They advanced to the championship game of the 2014 Big Sky Conference women's basketball tournament where they lost to North Dakota. They were invited to the Women's National Invitation Tournament where they defeated Washington State in the first round before losing to San Diego in the second round.

== Before the season ==
=== Departures ===
| Name | Pos. | Height | Hometown | Notes |
|---|---|---|---|---|
| Alyssa Smith | F | 6'0" | Monroe, WA | Graduated; signed to play professionally in Romania |
| Kenzie De Boer | G | 5'11" | Lynden, WA | Graduated |
| Katie Baker | F | 6'0" | Coeur d'Alene, ID | Graduated; Signed to play professionally in Luxembourg |
| Alexandra Hurley | F | 6'0" | Anaconda, MT | Graduated |

=== New additions ===
4 members signed letters-of-intent to join the Lady Griz team for the 2013–14 season.

| Name | Pos. | Height | Hometown | High School |
|---|---|---|---|---|
| Jade Redmon | G | 5'8" | Spokane, WA | Mead |
| Bethany Montgomery | G | 5'9" | Tacoma, WA | Wilson |
| Haley Shaner | F | 6'0" | Sacramento, CA | West Campus |
| Marly Anderson | C | 6'3" | Hillsboro, OR | Glencoe |

== Roster ==
| Number | Name | Position | Height | Year | Hometown |
|---|---|---|---|---|---|
| 2 | Torry Hill | Guard | 5–7 | Senior | Anaconda, Montana |
| 3 | Haley Vining | Guard | 5–7 | Redshirt Sophomore | Great Falls, Montana |
| 5 | McCalle Feller | Guard | 5–10 | Sophomore | Lewistown, Montana |
| 10 | Kayleigh Valley | Forward | 5–11 | Freshman | Spokane, Washington |
| 11 | Rachel Staudacher | Forward | 6–1 | Redshirt Freshman | Bothell, Washington |
| 12 | Kellie Cole | Guard | 5–9 | Redshirt Junior | Bozeman, Montana |
| 13 | Alycia Sims | Forward/Center | 6–3 | Freshman | Stevensville, Montana |
| 20 | Hannah Doran | Guard | 5–11 | Redshirt Sophomore | Corvallis, Oregon |
| 22 | Mekayala Isaak | Forward/Center | 6–2 | Freshman | Bend, Oregon |
| 24 | Carly Selvig | Forward | 6–2 | Redshirt Junior | Glendive, Montana |
| 30 | Molly Klinker | Forward | 6–0 | Redshirt Freshman | Fairfield, Montana |
| 31 | Jordan Sullivan | Forward | 6–2 | Senior | Sidney, Montana |
| 32 | Maggie Rickman | Forward | 6–0 | Junior | Helena, Montana |
| 33 | DJ Reinhardt | Guard | 5–7 | Redshirt Freshman | Missoula, Montana |
| 42 | Shanae Gilham | Guard | 5–10 | Sophomore | Browning, Montana |

== Schedule ==
| Date time, TV | Rank^{#} | Opponent^{#} | Result | Record | Site (attendance) city, state |
Exhibition
| 10/28/2013*; 7:00 pm, Watch Big Sky | | Montana State-Billings | W 69–65 | – | Dahlberg Arena (2,454); Missoula, MT |
| 11/07/2013*; 7:00 pm, Watch Big Sky | | Montana-Western | W 67–46 | – | Dahlberg Arena (2,360); Missoula, MT |
Regular Season
| 11/10/2013*; 2:00 pm, Watch Big Sky | | Montana State–Northern | W 76–49 | 1–0 | Dahlberg Arena (2,410); Missoula, MT |
| 11/18/2013*; 7:00 pm, Watch Big Sky | | Portland | W 68–61 | 2–0 | Dahlberg Arena (2,666); Missoula, MT |
| 11/27/2013*; 6:00 pm | | at Denver | W 84–58 | 3–0 | Magness Arena (383); Denver, CO |
| 11/29/2013*; 2:00 pm, LMUSN | | vs. North Dakota State; Loyola Marymount Tournament | L 53–70 | 3–1 | Gersten Pavilion (302); Los Angeles, CA |
| 11/30/2013*; 2:00, LMUSN | | at Loyola Marymount; Loyola Marymount Tournament | W 49–47 | 4–1 | Gersten Pavilion (437); Los Angeles, CA |
| 12/06/2013*; 8:00 pm, Watch Big Sky | | Idaho; 33rd Lady Griz Classic semifinals | W 59–56 | 5–1 | Dahlberg Arena (2,578); Missoula, MT |
| 12/07/2013*; 8:00 pm, Watch Big Sky | | UC Irvine; 33rd Lady Griz Classic championship | W 71–48 | 6–1 | Dahlberg Arena (2,593); Missoula, MT |
| 12/14/2013*; 7:00 pm, Watch Big Sky | | Temple | L 52–61 | 6–2 | Dahlberg Arena (2,649); Missoula, MT |
| 12/17/2013*; 7:00 pm, MW Net | | at Wyoming | L 65–79 | 6–3 | Arena-Auditorium (2,898); Laramie, WY |
| 01/02/2014; 6:30 pm, Watch Big Sky | | at Northern Arizona | W 87–67 | 7–3 (1–0) | Walkup Skydome (217); Flagstaff, AZ |
| 01/04/2014; 3:00 pm, Watch Big Sky | | at Sacramento State | L 81–91 | 7–4 (1–1) | Colberg Court (524); Sacramento, CA |
| 01/09/2014; 7:00 pm, Watch Big Sky | | Eastern Washington | W 81–64 | 8–4 (2–1) | Dahlberg Arena (3,113); Missoula, MT |
| 01/11/2014; 2:00 pm, Watch Big Sky | | Portland State | W 94–58 | 9–4 (3–1) | Dahlberg Arena (3,012); Missoula, MT |
| 01/16/2014; 7:00 pm, Watch Big Sky | | at North Dakota | L 57–62 | 9–5 (3–2) | Betty Engelstad Sioux Center (1,409); Grand Forks, ND |
| 01/18/2014; 2:00 pm, Watch Big Sky | | at Northern Colorado | L 54–57 | 9–6 (3–3) | Butler–Hancock Sports Pavilion (767); Greeley, CO |
| 01/23/2014; 7:00 pm, Watch Big Sky | | Idaho State | W 67–48 | 10–6 (4–3) | Dahlberg Arena (3,035); Missoula, MT |
| 01/25/2014; 2:00 pm, Watch Big Sky | | Weber State | W 68–52 | 11–6 (5–3) | Dahlberg Arena (3,097); Missoula, MT |
| 02/01/2014; 2:00 pm, Watch Big Sky | | Southern Utah | W 81–73 | 12–6 (6–3) | Dahlberg Arena (2,966); Missoula, MT |
| 02/03/2014; 7:00 pm | | Montana State | W 84–79 ^{OT} | 13–6 (7–3) | Dahlberg Arena (3,448); Missoula, MT |
| 02/06/2014; 8:00 pm, Watch Big Sky | | at Portland State | W 65–55 | 14–6 (8–3) | Stott Center (211); Portland, OR |
| 02/08/2014; 3:00 pm, Watch Big Sky | | at Eastern Washington | L 61–71 | 14–7 (8–4) | Reese Court (1,118); Cheney, WA |
| 02/13/2014; 7:00 pm, Watch Big Sky | | Northern Colorado | W 61–55 | 15–7 (9–4) | Dahlberg Arena (3,039); Missoula, MT |
| 02/15/2014; 2:00 pm, Watch Big Sky | | North Dakota | W 52–49 | 16–7 (10–4) | Dahlberg Arena (3,456); Missoula, MT |
| 02/20/2014; 7:00 pm, Watch Big Sky | | at Weber State | L 54–56 | 16–8 (10–5) | Dee Events Center (657); Ogden, UT |
| 02/22/2014; 2:00 pm, Watch Big Sky | | at Idaho State | W 76–67 | 17–8 (11–5) | Reed Gym (1,230); Pocatello, ID |
| 02/26/2014; 7:00 pm, Watch Big Sky | | at Southern Utah | L 49–69 | 17–9 (11–6) | Centrum Arena (1,292); Cedar City, UT |
| 03/03/2014; 7:00 pm, Max Media | | at Montana State | W 72–65 | 18–9 (12–6) | Worthington Arena (2,004); Bozeman, MT |
| 03/06/2014; 7:00 pm, Watch Big Sky | | Sacramento State | W 87–76 | 19–9 (13–6) | Dahlberg Arena (3,814); Missoula, MT |
| 03/08/2014; 2:00 pm, Watch Big Sky | | Northern Arizona | W 83–66 | 20–9 (14–6) | Dahlberg Arena (3,614); Missoula, MT |
2014 Big Sky tournament
| 03/13/2013; 4:00 pm | | vs. Montana State; Quarterfinals | W 75–66 | 21–9 | Betty Engelstad Sioux Center (952); Grand Forks, ND |
| 03/14/2013; 6:30 pm | | vs. Southern Utah; Semifinals | W 73–69 | 22–9 | Betty Engelstad Sioux Center (1,409); Grand Forks, ND |
| 03/15/2013; 2:00 pm | | vs. North Dakota; Championship Game | L 55–72 | 22–10 | Betty Engelstad Sioux Center (1,937); Grand Forks, ND |
2014 WNIT
| 03/19/2013*; 7:00 pm | | Washington State; First Round | W 90–78 | 23–10 | Dahlberg Arena (2,125); Missoula, MT |
| 03/24/2013*; 7:00 pm | | San Diego; Second Round | L 57–60 | 23–11 | Dahlberg Arena (3,240); Missoula, MT |
*Non-conference game. ^{#}Rankings from AP Poll. (#) Tournament seedings in parentheses. All times are in Mountain Time.

== See also ==
2013–14 Montana Grizzlies basketball team
