= Marsha Frese =

American basketball coach (born 1972)

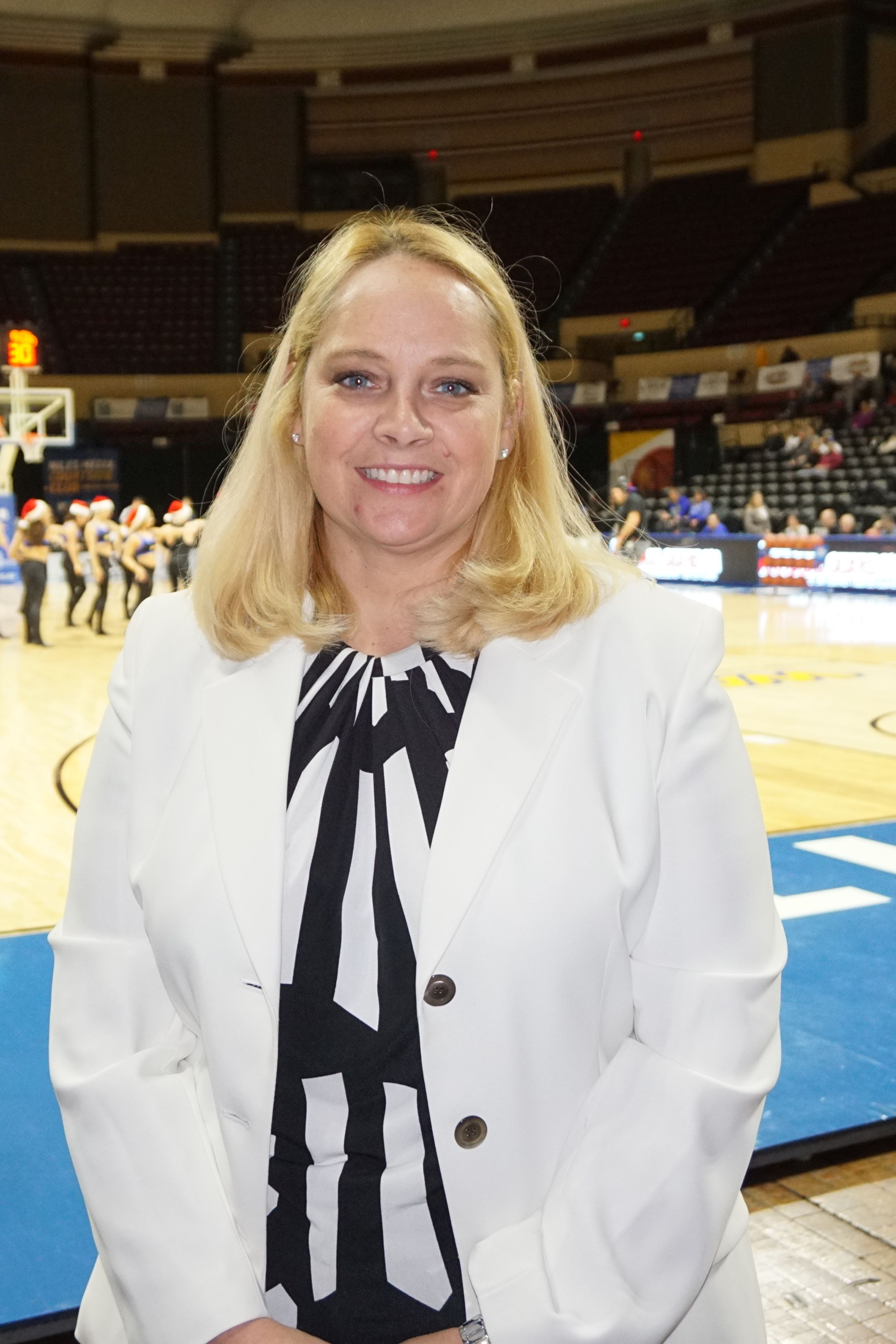

Current position
- Title: Assistant coach
- Team: Georgia Tech
- Conference: ACC

Biographical details
- Born: March 2, 1972 (age 54); Cedar Rapids, Iowa, U.S.

Playing career
- 1990–1994: Rice
- Position: Guard

Coaching career (HC unless noted)
- 1999–2001: Ball State (asst.)
- 2001–2002: Minnesota (asst.)
- 2002–2003: Maryland (asst.)
- 2003–2007: Illinois (assoc. HC)
- 2007–2008: Ball State (asst.)
- 2010–2012: Northern Illinois (assoc. HC)
- 2012–2017: UMKC
- 2020–2022: San Diego State (asst.)
- 2022–2025: Loyola Chicago (asst.)
- 2025–present: Georgia Tech (asst.)

Head coaching record
- Overall: 36–82

Marsha Kay Frese-Elliott (born March 2, 1972) is an American college basketball coach, most recently working as an assistant coach for Boston College. She had previously been the head women's basketball coach at UMKC.

== Playing career ==
Frese played basketball at Washington High School in Cedar Rapids, Iowa. She was the leading scorer in the state in both 1989 and 1990. In 1988 she helped lead the team to the Iowa state title. Based on her accomplishments she was named Miss Iowa basketball in 1990 by USA Today and the Gatorade Circle of Champions.

Frese attended Rice University, where she played basketball all four years. Frese set the Rice school record for the best three point field-goal percentage in a season and ranked sixth in history and three-pointers made. She graduated in 1995 with a bachelor of arts degree in communication.

== Broadcast career ==
After graduation, Frese was the first female sports anchor for KALB-TV in Alexandria, Louisiana. She also worked as a color commentator for the radio broadcasts of Rice University and Louisiana College.

== Coaching career ==
Frese started her career as an assistant coach at Ball State where her sister Brenda Frese was the head coach. She served in that position for two seasons, from 1999 through 2001. When Brenda (at the time Brenda Oldfield) was named head coach of Minnesota, Marsha joined the staff as an assistant coach. Her emphasis was on recruiting, and she helped attract the 15th best recruiting class in the country. On the court, the Gophers posted the biggest turnaround in the nation following 8–20 record with a 22–8 record improving their wins by 14.

Brenda then accepted the head coaching position at Maryland and Marsha joined her for the initial season 2002–03. Marsha again concentrated on recruiting and help Maryland sign one of the best recruiting classes in the country which would go on to win the national championship. After one year at Maryland, Marsha chose to go to Illinois to be an assistant coach for Hall of Fame coach Theresa Grentz. After four years at Illinois, two as an assistant coach and two as the associate head coach, Marsha returned to Ball State as an assistant coach. The head coach of Ball State, Tracy Roller had been an assistant on the Ball State staff when Marsha last work there.

Marsha spent a year as an assistant at Ball State and then left coaching for two years, working as a financial advisor while raising her family. Then she became the associate head coach and recruiting coordinator for Northern Illinois University under Kathi Bennett, the head coach. She stayed in that position for two years before accepting the head coaching job at UMKC where she remained until 2017.

In 2012, Frese inherited a team that had graduated 7 seniors the season before. In 2013, UMKC moved to the Western Athletic Conference and Athletic Director Tim Hall left for the same position at the University of Maryland, Baltimore County.

The 2014–2015 season proved a challenging one as the Roos welcomed a freshman recruiting class of 7. While highly ranked the class, went through the expected growing pains and finished 6-23 overall. By season's end the UMKC freshmen ranked #1 in the country in minutes played, points scored and rebounds among all Division 1 teams. Off the court, UMKC was tops again academically posting the highest GPA in Division 1 basketball for the second consecutive season.

2015-2016 showed the true growth of the highly ranked class of Roos, finishing with a 10–18 record and 5–9 finish in WAC play. Poised for a breakout year in 2016–2017 season, UMKC growth stalled with injuries to starters for a combined 18 games, and an epilepsy diagnosis to All-Conference selection Aries Washington. Frese's contract was not renewed after the conclusion of the 2016-2017 season.

In 2017, she was named an assistant coach for Boston College but resigned in the summer, citing personal reasons.

== Head coaching record ==
Record table
Season	Team	Overall	Conference	Standing	Postseason
UMKC Kangaroos (Summit League) (2012–2013)
2012–13	UMKC	9–21	5–11	8th	
UMKC Kangaroos (Western Athletic Conference) (2013–present)
2013–14	UMKC	11–19	7–9	T–6th	
2014–15	UMKC	6–24	4–10	7th	
2015–16	UMKC	10–18	5–9	6th	
2016–17	UMKC	10–19	4–10	6th	
UMKC:		47–101 (.318)	25–49 (.338)		
Total:		47–101 (.318)			
