= 2013–14 Utah Valley Wolverines women's basketball team =

Intercollegiate basketball season

2013–14 Utah Valley Wolverines women's basketball
- Conference: Western Athletic Conference
- Record: 7–23 (4–12 WAC)
- Head coach: Cathy Nixon (18th season)
- Assistant coaches: Curtis Condie (1st season); Terry Parker (4th season); Walter Hopkins (1st season)
- Home arena: UCCU Center; PE Building

2013–14 WAC women's basketball standings
	Conf.				Overall
Team	W		L	PCT	W		L	PCT
Idaho†	15	–	1	.938	25	–	9	.735
Cal State Bakersfield	12	–	4	.750	19	–	12	.613
Grand Canyon*	10	–	6	.625	21	–	9	.700
Seattle U	9	–	7	.563	16	–	16	.500
Texas-Pan American	8	–	8	.500	14	–	16	.467
New Mexico State	7	–	9	.438	11	–	20	.355
UMKC	7	–	9	.438	11	–	19	.367
Utah Valley	4	–	12	.250	7	–	23	.233
Chicago State	0	–	16	.000	3	–	27	.100
† 2014 WAC tournament winner As of March 22, 2014 * Grand Canyon ineligible for WAC Basketball Tournament as part of reclassification from Division II; Rankings from AP poll

The 2013–14 Utah Valley Wolverines women's basketball team represented Utah Valley University in the 2013–14 college basketball season. Cathy Nixon entered the season as head coach for the 18th consecutive season. The Wolverines played their home games at the UCCU Center and the PE Building as new members of the WAC.

== Roster ==
2013–14 Utah Valley Wolverines women's basketball team
Players
Coaches

Pos.	#	Name	Height	Year	Previous school	Hometown
F	3	Karlee Kartchner	6 ft 0 in (1.83 m)	RS Fr	Mountain Crest	Hyrum, UT
G	4	Ashley Baugh	6 ft 1 in (1.85 m)	Fr	American Fork	American Fork, UT
G	5	Georgia Agnew	5 ft 9 in (1.75 m)	Fr	Salem Hills	Hamilton, New Zealand
F	11	Makaily Worthington	6 ft 0 in (1.83 m)	Fr	Queen Creek	Queen Creek, AZ
F	12	Rebecca MaWhinney	6 ft 1 in (1.85 m)	Fr	Wasatch	Midway, UT
G	13	Ashley Klemz	5 ft 8 in (1.73 m)	Jr	Centennial	Las Vegas, NV
F	14	Mika Pinner	6 ft 1 in (1.85 m)	Jr	Mountain View; Western Wyoming CC	Orem, UT
G	20	Katie Kuklok	5 ft 10 in (1.78 m)	RS So	Poway; San Diego	Poway, CA
G	21	Rhiah Spooner-Knight	5 ft 10 in (1.78 m)	Fr	Sacred Heart Girls' College	Hamilton, New Zealand
F	22	Kyra Prause	5 ft 9 in (1.75 m)	Sr	Arlington	Arlington, WA
G	23	Tina Doughty	5 ft 10 in (1.78 m)	Jr	Granbury; New Mexico	Granbury, TX
G	33	Whitney Jenkins	5 ft 9 in (1.75 m)	Sr	Skyline	Salt Lake City, UT
C	40	Sam Loggins	6 ft 5 in (1.96 m)	So	Mountain View	Boise, ID

Head coach

- Cathy Nixon (BYU)

Assistant coach(es)

- Jason Glover (Grand Canyon)
- Liz Darger (BYU)
- Walter Hopkins (Nevada)

Legend

- (C) Team captain
- (S) Suspended
- (I) Ineligible
- (W) Walk-on
- Injured
- Current redshirt

== Schedule and results ==
Date time, TV	Opponent	Result	Record	Site (attendance) city, state
Exhibition
11/01/2017*; 7:00 pm, UVU Digital	Adams State	W 85–50	-	PE Building (N/A); Orem, UT
Regular Season
11/08/2013*; 4:00 pm, UVUtv	Nevada	L 67–79	0–1	UCCU Center (389); Orem, UT
11/09/2013*; 7:05 pm, UVU Digital	Walla Walla	W 114–27	1–1	UCCU Center (181); Orem, UT
11/14/2013*; 5:00 pm	at George Mason	L 64–82	1–2	Patriot Center (329); Fairfax, VA
11/16/2013*; 7:00 pm	at Longwood	L 57–59	1–3	Willett Hall (797); Farmville, VA
11/21/2013*; 7:00 pm, Watch Big Sky	at Southern Utah	L 63–74	1–4	Centrum Arena (664); Cedar City, UT
11/27/2013*; 1:00 pm, UVU Digital	Sacramento State	L 84–87	1–5	UCCU Center (210); Orem, UT
11/30/2013*; 3:00 pm, UVU Digital	Northern Arizona	L 60–80	1–6	UCCU Center (189); Orem, UT
12/05/2013*; 5:30 pm, MW Net	at Boise State	L 60–63	1–7	Taco Bell Arena (5,083); Boise, ID
12/07/2013*; 2:00 pm, Watch Big Sky	at Weber State	L 64–79	1–8	Dee Events Center (575); Ogden, UT
12/11/2013*; 7:00 pm, P12 Digital	at Utah	L 70–81	1–9	Huntsman Center (649); Salt Lake City, UT
12/14/2013*; 3:00 pm, UVU Digital	Santa Clara	L 61–64	1–10	PE Building (156); Orem, UT
12/20/2013*; 3:00 pm, UVU Digital	Idaho State	W 59–56	2–10	UCCU Center (234); Orem, UT
12/28/2013*; 3:00 pm, UVU Digital	New Orleans	W 84–49	3–10	UCCU Center (184); Orem, UT
01/04/2014; 3:00 pm, UVU Digital	Cal State Bakersfield	L 59–61	3–11 (0–1)	UCCU Center (219); Orem, UT
01/11/2014; 2:00 pm, GCU Showcase	at Grand Canyon	L 51–88	3–12 (0–2)	GCU Arena (404); Phoenix, AZ
01/16/2014; 7:00 pm, UVU Digital	Idaho	L 55–96	3–13 (0–3)	UCCU Center (184); Orem, UT
01/18/2014; 3:00 pm, UVU Digital	Seattle	L 67–75	3–14 (0–4)	PE Building (202); Orem, UT
01/23/2014; 6:00 pm	at UMKC	L 66–83	3–15 (0–5)	Swinney Recreation Center (359); Kansas City, MO
01/25/2014; 1:00 pm, CSU-TV	at Chicago State	W 72–46	4–15 (1–5)	Emil and Patricia Jones Convocation Center (211); Chicago, IL
01/30/2014; 7:00 pm, UVU Digital	Texas–Pan America	L 54–64	4–16 (1–6)	UCCU Center (138); Orem, UT
02/01/2014; 3:00 pm, UVU Digital	New Mexico State	L 78–83 ^{OT}	4–17 (1–7)	PE Building (317); Orem, UT
02/06/2014; 7:00 pm, UVU Digital	Grand Canyon	L 63–66	4–18 (1–8)	UCCU Center (190); Orem, UT
02/13/2014; 8:00 pm	at Seattle	L 65–69	4–19 (1–9)	Connolly Center (276); Seattle, WA
02/15/2014; 3:00 pm	at Idaho	L 61–69	4–20 (1–10)	Cowan Spectrum (967); Moscow, ID
02/20/2014; 7:00 pm, UVU Digital	Chicago State	W 84–62	5–20 (2–10)	UCCU Center (191); Orem, UT
02/22/2014; 3:00 pm, UVU Digital	UMKC	W 49–43	6–20 (3–10)	UCCU Center (322); Orem, UT
02/27/2014; 6:00 pm, ESPN3	at New Mexico State	W 87–81	7–20 (4–10)	Pan American Center (410); Las Cruces, NM
03/01/2014; 6:00 pm	at Texas-Pan American	L 46–55	7–21 (4–11)	UTPA Fieldhouse (398); Edinburg, TX
03/08/2014; 2:00 pm	at Cal State Bakersfield	L 51–66	7–22 (4–12)	Icardo Center (358); Bakersfield, CA
2014 WAC women's basketball tournament
03/12/2014; 9:30 pm	vs. Cal State Bakersfield; Quarterfinals	L 63–65 ^{OT}	7–23	Orleans Arena (623); Paradise, NV
*Non-conference game. ^{#}Rankings from AP Poll. (#) Tournament seedings in parentheses.

== See also ==
2013–14 Utah Valley Wolverines men's basketball team
