= 2013–14 Southern Utah Thunderbirds women's basketball team =

Intercollegiate basketball season

2013–14 Southern Utah Thunderbirds women's basketball

WNIT, Second Round
- Conference: Big Sky Conference
- Record: 18–8 (12–5 Big Sky)
- Head coach: JR Payne (5th season)
- Assistant coaches: Toriano Towns (5th season); Jill Mahoney (2nd season)
- Home arena: Centrum Arena

2013–14 Big Sky women's basketball standings
	Conf.				Overall
Team	W		L	PCT	W		L	PCT
North Dakota†	15	–	5	.750	22	–	10	.688
Southern Utah	15	–	5	.750	23	–	10	.697
Montana	14	–	6	.700	23	–	11	.676
Eastern Washington	12	–	8	.600	16	–	14	.533
Idaho State	11	–	9	.550	14	–	17	.452
Montana State	10	–	10	.500	15	–	15	.500
Sacramento State	10	–	10	.500	18	–	12	.600
Northern Colorado	8	–	12	.400	14	–	15	.483
Northern Arizona	6	–	14	.300	9	–	20	.310
Portland State	6	–	14	.300	8	–	21	.276
Weber State	3	–	17	.150	7	–	22	.241
† 2014 Big Sky tournament winner As of 10:03, 1 April 2014 (UTC); Rankings from AP poll

The 2013–14 Southern Utah Thunderbirds women's basketball team represented Southern Utah University during the 2013–14 NCAA Division I women's basketball season. The T–Birds were led by fifth year head coach JR Payne and played their home games at the Centrum Arena. They were members of the Big Sky Conference.

== Roster ==
2013–14 Southern Utah Thunderbirds women's basketball team
Players
Coaches

Pos.	#	Name	Height	Year	Previous school	Hometown
G	2	Mary Klapperich	6 ft 1 in (1.85 m)	Fr	Colony	Wasilla, AK
G	3	Desiree Jackson	5 ft 10 in (1.78 m)	RS Jr	Vista del Lago	Moreno Valley, CA
G	4	Ashleigh Munns	5 ft 9 in (1.75 m)	So	SEEVIC College	Basildon, Essex, England
G	5	Andrea Jones	5 ft 5 in (1.65 m)	Sr	Dobson	Mesa, AZ
G	10	DJ Norman	5 ft 9 in (1.75 m)	Jr	Linn-Mar	Marion, IA
F	12	Marissa Robbins	5 ft 11 in (1.8 m)	Sr	Stansbury Park; Salt Lake CC	Lake Point, UT
F	15	Carli Moreland	6 ft 1 in (1.85 m)	Sr	Legacy	Broomfield, CO
F	20	Lori Parkinson	6 ft 1 in (1.85 m)	So	Cyprus	West Valley, UT
G/F	21	Maylinn Smith	5 ft 9 in (1.75 m)	Sr	Mesquite; Grand Canyon	Mesa, AZ
G	23	Hailey Mandelko	5 ft 8 in (1.73 m)	Jr	Lexington	Lexington, NE
G	24	Madison Wright	5 ft 10 in (1.78 m)	Fr	Gonzaga Prep	Spokane, WA
F	43	Jessica Richardson	5 ft 11 in (1.8 m)	Fr	Kaysville	Kaysville, UT
G	45	Marquelle Funk	6 ft 0 in (1.83 m)	So	Lone Peak	Highland, UT
C	52	Brenna Gates	6 ft 4 in (1.93 m)	Jr	Lindhurst	Olivehurst, CA

Head coach

- JR Payne (Saint Mary's)

Assistant coach(es)

- Toriano Towns (Saint Mary's)
- Jill Mahoney (Grand Canyon)

Legend

- (C) Team captain
- (S) Suspended
- (I) Ineligible
- (W) Walk-on
- Injured
- Current redshirt

Roster
Last update: 2013-10-12

== Schedule ==
Date time, TV	Rank^{#}	Opponent^{#}	Result	Record	Site (attendance) city, state
Exhibition
10/30/2013*; 7:30 pm, Watch Big Sky		Dixie State	W 90-69	–	Centrum Arena (N/A); Cedar City, UT
11/02/2013*; 7:30 pm, Watch Big Sky		Western State	W 92-49	–	Centrum Arena (N/A); Cedar City, UT
Regular Season
11/08/2013*; 7:00 pm		at Boise State	W 90-86	1-0	Taco Bell Arena (5,663); Boise, ID
11/14/2013*; 6:00 pm		at Texas A&M–Corpus Christi	W 74–67	2–0	Dugan Wellness Center (480); Corpus Christi, TX
11/16/2013*; 5:30 pm, LSN		at Houston Baptist	L 77–88	2–1	Sharp Gymnasium (347); Houston, TX
11/21/2013*; 7:00 pm, Watch Big Sky		at Utah Valley	W 74–63	3–1	Centrum Arena (664); Cedar City, UT
11/23/2013*; 5:00 pm, Watch Big Sky		Westminster	W 68–65	4–1	Centrum Arena (567); Cedar City, UT
11/29/2013*; 2:30 pm		vs. Georgia Tech; LIU Tournament	L 60–85	4–2	Steinberg Wellness Center (204); Brooklyn, NY
11/30/2013*; 12:00, Watch Big Sky		at LIU Brooklyn; LIU Tournament	W 57–44	5–2	Steinberg Wellness Center (175); Brooklyn, NY
12/16/2013*; 7:00 pm, Watch Big Sky		Arizona Christian	W 101–44	6–2	Centrum Arena (404); Cedar City, UT
12/19/2013; 7:00 pm, Watch Big Sky		at Northern Colorado	W 75–63	7–2 (1–0)	Butler–Hancock Sports Pavilion (357); Greeley, CO
12/29/2013*; 2:00 pm		at No. 12 Colorado	L 59–75	7–3	Coors Events Center (2,094); Boulder, CO
01/02/2014; 5:00 pm, Watch Big Sky		at North Dakota	L 68–71	7–4 (1–1)	Betty Engelstad Sioux Center (1,480); Grand Forks, ND
01/11/2014; 3:00 pm, Watch Big Sky		at Sacramento State	W 97–79	8–4 (2–1)	Colberg Court (708); Sacramento, CA
01/13/2014; 6:30 pm, FSAZ		at Northern Arizona	L 77–82	8–5 (2–2)	Walkup Skydome (449); Flagstaff, AZ
01/16/2014; 7:00 pm, Watch Big Sky		Weber State	W 76–64	9–5 (3–2)	Centrum Arena (864); Cedar City, UT
01/18/2014; 2:00 pm, Watch Big Sky		Idaho State	L 65–69	9–6 (3–3)	Centrum Arena (464); Cedar City, UT
01/23/2014; 7:00 pm, Watch Big Sky		Portland State	W 69–60	10–6 (4–3)	Centrum Arena (598); Cedar City, UT
01/25/2014; 2:00 pm, Watch Big Sky		Eastern Washington	W 62–61	11–6 (5–3)	Centrum Arena (445); Cedar City, UT
01/30/2014; 7:00 pm, Watch Big Sky		at Montana State	W 87–81	12–6 (6–3)	Worthington Arena (1,232); Bozeman, MT
02/01/2014; 2:00 pm, Watch Big Sky		at Montana	L 73–81	12–7 (6–4)	Dahlberg Arena (2,966); Missoula, MT
02/08/2014; 7:00 pm, Watch Big Sky		Sacramento State	W 93–74	13–7 (7–4)	Centrum Arena (462); Cedar City, UT
02/10/2014; 7:00 pm, Watch Big Sky		Northern Arizona	W 93–59	14–7 (8–4)	Centrum Arena (501); Cedar City, UT
02/13/2014; 7:00 pm, Watch Big Sky		at Idaho State	W 70–66	15–7 (9–4)	Reed Gym (975); Pocatello, ID
02/15/2014; 2:00 pm, Watch Big Sky		at Weber State	W 80–64	16–7 (10–4)	Dee Events Center (720); Ogden, UT
02/20/2014; 7:00 pm, Watch Big Sky		at Eastern Washington	L 54–59	16–8 (10–5)	Reese Court (463); Cheney, WA
02/22/2014; 3:00 pm, Watch Big Sky		at Portland State	W 86–79	17–8 (11–5)	Stott Center (1,500); Portland, OR
02/26/2014; 7:00 pm, Watch Big Sky		Montana	W 69–49	18–8 (12–5)	Centrum Arena (1,292); Cedar City, UT
03/01/2014; 2:00 pm, Watch Big Sky		Montana State	W 70–60	19–8 (13–5)	Centrum Arena (711); Cedar City, UT
03/06/2014; 5:00 pm, Watch Big Sky		North Dakota	W 73–53	20–8 (14–5)	Centrum Arena (711); Cedar City, UT
03/08/2014; 7:30 pm, Watch Big Sky		Northern Colorado	W 63–48	21–8 (15–5)	Centrum Arena (1,045); Cedar City, UT
Big Sky tournament
03/13/2014; 1:30 pm, Watch Big Sky	(2)	vs. (7) Sacramento State; Quarterfinals	W 86–78	22–8	Betty Engelstad Sioux Center (921); Grand Forks, ND
03/14/2014; 6:30 pm, Watch Big Sky	(2)	vs. (3) Montana; Semifinals	L 69–73	22–9	Betty Engelstad Sioux Center (1,409); Grand Forks, ND
2014 WNIT
03/20/2014*; 7:00 pm, Watch Big Sky		at Colorado State; First Round	W 71–56	23–9	Moby Arena (1,550); Fort Collins, CO
03/22/2014*; 7:00 pm, Watch Big Sky		at Colorado; Second Round	L 68–79	23–10	Coors Events Center (854); Boulder, CO
*Non-conference game. ^{#}Rankings from AP Poll. (#) Tournament seedings in parentheses. All times are in Mountain Time.

== See also ==
- 2013–14 Southern Utah Thunderbirds basketball team
