= 2013–14 Idaho Vandals women's basketball team =

Intercollegiate basketball season

2013–14 Idaho Vandals women's basketball

WAC Regular Season & Tournament Champions

NCAA Women's Tournament, first round
- Conference: Western Athletic Conference
- Record: 25–9 (15–1 WAC)
- Head coach: Jon Newlee (6th season)
- Assistant coaches: Jordan Green (3rd season); Christa Stanford (6th season); Kristi Zeller (3rd season)
- Home arena: Cowan Spectrum

2013–14 WAC women's basketball standings
	Conf.				Overall
Team	W		L	PCT	W		L	PCT
Idaho†	15	–	1	.938	25	–	9	.735
Cal State Bakersfield	12	–	4	.750	19	–	12	.613
Grand Canyon*	10	–	6	.625	21	–	9	.700
Seattle U	9	–	7	.563	16	–	16	.500
Texas-Pan American	8	–	8	.500	14	–	16	.467
New Mexico State	7	–	9	.438	11	–	20	.355
UMKC	7	–	9	.438	11	–	19	.367
Utah Valley	4	–	12	.250	7	–	23	.233
Chicago State	0	–	16	.000	3	–	27	.100
† 2014 WAC tournament winner As of March 22, 2014 * Grand Canyon ineligible for WAC Basketball Tournament as part of reclassification from Division II; Rankings from AP poll

The 2013–14 Idaho Vandals women's basketball team represented the University of Idaho during the 2013–14 NCAA Division I women's basketball season. The Vandals, led by sixth year head coach Jon Newlee, played their home games at the Cowan Spectrum and were members of the Western Athletic Conference. It was Idaho's final season in the WAC as they will join the Big Sky Conference for the 2014–15 season. The Vandals would win the WAC championship and participate in the NCAA Tournament.

== Roster ==
Number	Name	Position	Height	Year	Hometown
1	Christina Salvatore	Guard	5–11	Sophomore	Anaheim, California
2	Karlee Wilson	Guard	5–4	Freshman	Lewiston, Idaho
4	Brooke Reilly	Post	6–1	Freshman	Spokane, Washington
10	Stacey Barr	Guard	5–8	Junior	Melbourne, Australia
11	Janelle Chow	Guard	5–8	Redshirt Senior	Mercer Island, Washington
12	Nejra Solo	Post	6–5	Freshman	Zenica, Bosnia
13	Ali Forde	Post	6–2	Sophomore	Woodinville, Washington
14	Maren Austgulen	Post	6–0	Junior	Bergen, Norway
20	Addie Schivo	Guard	5–6	Senior	San Francisco, California
32	Agueda Trujillo Fernandez	Guard	6–0	Freshman	Manacor, Spain
33	Alyssa Charlston	Post	6–1	Senior	Sammamish, Washington
35	Connie Ballestro	Guard	5–9	Sophomore	Orange, California

== Schedule ==
Date time, TV	Rank^{#}	Opponent^{#}	Result	Record	Site (attendance) city, state
Regular Season
11/08/2013*; 6:00 pm		at No. 25 Gonzaga; Preseason WNIT	L 56–64	0–1	McCarthey Athletic Center (5,607); Spokane, WA
11/15/2013*; 3:00 pm		vs. Mount St. Mary's; Preseason WNIT	W 81–63	1–1	Joseph J. Gentile Arena (N/A); Chicago, IL
11/16/2013*; 4:30 pm		at Loyola; Preseason WNIT	W 62–60	2–1	Joseph J. Gentile Arena (305); Chicago, IL
11/23/2013*; 2:00 pm		UC Irvine	W 68–63	3–1	Cowan Spectrum (300); Moscow, ID
11/26/2013*; 6:00 pm, USD TV		at San Diego	L 64–74	3–2	Jenny Craig Pavilion (312); San Diego, CA
11/29/2013*; 5:00 pm, MWN		at Nevada; John Ascuaga's Nugget Classic	W 88–77	4–2	Lawlor Events Center (1,252); Reno, NV
11/30/2013*; 8:00 pm		vs. No. 20 Cal; John Ascuaga's Nugget Classic	L 55–59	4–3	Lawlor Events Center (N/A); Reno, NV
12/03/2013*; 6:00 pm		Carroll College	W 67–39	5–3	Cowan Spectrum (429); Moscow, ID
12/06/2013*; 6:00 pm, Watch Big Sky		at Montana; Lady Griz Classic	L 56–59	5–4	Dahlberg Arena (2,578); Missoula, MT
12/07/2013*; 5:00 pm, Watch Big Sky		vs. Appalachian State; Lady Griz Classic	W 83–60	6–4	Dahlberg Arena (638); Missoula, MY
12/11/2013*; 6:00 pm		Lewis & Clark	W 84–53	7–4	Cowan Spectrum (725); Moscow, ID
12/14/2013*; 2:00 pm, Watch Big Sky		at Eastern Washington	L 84–85	7–5	Reese Court (635); Cheney, WA
12/21/2013*; 2:00 pm		Wyoming	L 64–72	7–6	Cowan Spectrum (405); Moscow, ID
12/28/2013*; 2:00 pm, LONG		at Texas	L 58–87	7–7	Frank Erwin Center (3,119); Austin, TX
01/02/2014; 5:00 pm		at UMKC	W 81–64	8–7 (1–0)	Swinney Recreation Center (609); Kansas City, MO
01/04/2014; 12:00 pm, CSU TV		at Chicago State	W 92–42	9–7 (2–0)	Emil and Patricia Jones Convocation Center (200); Chicago, IL
01/09/2014; 6:00 pm		Texas–Pan American	W 76–65	10–7 (3–0)	Cowan Spectrum (405); Moscow, ID
01/11/2014; 2:00 pm		New Mexico State	W 79–51	11–7 (4–0)	Cowan Spectrum (415); Moscow, ID
01/16/2014; 6:00 pm		at Utah Valley	W 96–55	12–7 (5–0)	UCCU Center (184); Orem, UT
01/18/2014; 2:00 pm		at Cal State Bakersfield	W 96–69	13–7 (6–0)	Icardo Center (227); Bakersfield, CA
01/23/2014; 6:00 pm		Grand Canyon	W 58–54	14–7 (7–0)	Cowan Spectrum (623); Moscow, ID
02/01/2014; 7:00 pm		at Seattle	W 77–59	15–7 (8–0)	Connolly Center (460); Seattle, WA
02/06/2014; 6:00 pm, ESPN3		at New Mexico State	W 75–66	16–7 (9–0)	Pan American Center (487); Las Cruces, NM
02/08/2014; 5:00 pm		at Texas–Pan American	W 85–52	17–7 (10–0)	UTPA Fieldhouse (404); Edinburg, TX
02/13/2014; 6:00 pm		Cal State Bakersfield	L 60–79	17–8 (10–1)	Cowan Spectrum (789); Moscow, ID
02/15/2014; 2:00 pm		Utah Valley	W 69–61	18–8 (11–1)	Cowan Spectrum (967); Moscow, ID
02/22/2014; 2:00 pm		at Grand Canyon	W 68–54	19–8 (12–1)	GCU Arena (304); Phoenix, AZ
03/01/2014; 2:00 pm		Seattle	W 60–57	20–8 (13–1)	Cowan Spectrum (1,054); Moscow, ID
03/06/2014; 6:00 pm		Chicago State	W 91–41	21–8 (14–1)	Cowan Spectrum (501); Moscow, ID
03/08/2014; 2:00 pm		UMKC	W 70–63	22–8 (15–1)	Cowan Spectrum (751); Moscow, ID
WAC tournament
03/12/2014; 12:00 pm		vs. Chicago State; Quarterfinals	W 84–43	23–8	Orleans Arena (N/A); Paradise, NV
03/14/2014; 12:00 pm		vs. New Mexico State; Semifinals	W 75–65	24–8	Orleans Arena (N/A); Paradise, NV
03/15/2014; 1:00 pm, ESPNU		vs. Seattle; Championship	W 75–67	25–8	Orleans Arena (588); Paradise, NV
NCAA tournament
03/23/2014; 2:30 pm, ESPN/ESPN3		vs. Louisville; 1st Round	L 42–88	25–9	Carver-Hawkeye Arena (5,799); Iowa City, IA
*Non-conference game. ^{#}Rankings from AP Poll. (#) Tournament seedings in parentheses. All times are in Pacific Time.

== See also ==
2013–14 Idaho Vandals men's basketball team
