= 2013–14 University of North Dakota women's basketball team =

Intercollegiate basketball season

2013–14 University of North Dakota women's basketball

Big Sky regular season & tournament champions

NCAA women's tournament, first round
- Conference: Big Sky Conference
- Record: 22–10 (15–5 Big Sky)
- Head coach: Travis Brewster (2nd season)
- Assistant coaches: Brent Pollari; Val Sussex; Mallory Youngblut
- Home arena: Betty Engelstad Sioux Center

2013–14 Big Sky women's basketball standings
	Conf.				Overall
Team	W		L	PCT	W		L	PCT
North Dakota†	15	–	5	.750	22	–	10	.688
Southern Utah	15	–	5	.750	23	–	10	.697
Montana	14	–	6	.700	23	–	11	.676
Eastern Washington	12	–	8	.600	16	–	14	.533
Idaho State	11	–	9	.550	14	–	17	.452
Montana State	10	–	10	.500	15	–	15	.500
Sacramento State	10	–	10	.500	18	–	12	.600
Northern Colorado	8	–	12	.400	14	–	15	.483
Northern Arizona	6	–	14	.300	9	–	20	.310
Portland State	6	–	14	.300	8	–	21	.276
Weber State	3	–	17	.150	7	–	22	.241
† 2014 Big Sky tournament winner As of 10:03, 1 April 2014 (UTC); Rankings from AP poll

The 2013–14 University of North Dakota women's basketball team represented the University of North Dakota during the 2013–14 NCAA Division I women's basketball season. They were led by second-year head coach Travis Brewster and played their home games at the Betty Engelstad Sioux Center. They were members of the Big Sky Conference. They finished the season 22–10, 15–5 in Big Sky play to win the Big Sky regular season. They were also champions of the Big Sky Women's Basketball Tournament for the first time in program history, to earn an automatic trip to the 2014 NCAA Division I women's basketball tournament, where they lost in the first round to Texas A&M.

== Roster ==
Number	Name	Position	Height	Year	Hometown
1	Leah Szabla	Guard	5–9	Freshman	Brooklyn Park, Minnesota
2	Mia Loyd	Forward	5–11	Sophomore	Minneapolis, Minnesota
3	Katie Klapprodt	Guard	5–3	RS freshman	Rapid City, South Dakota
4	Siri Burck	Guard	6–0	Freshman	Fargo, North Dakota
5	Samantha Roscoe	Forward	6–3	Freshman	Perth, Western Australia
10	Makailah Dyer	Guard	5–9	Freshman	Madison, Wisconsin
13	Madi Buck	Forward	6–0	Senior	Bismarck, North Dakota
15	Kelsey Knox	Guard	5–7	Sophomore	Platte City, Missouri
21	Ellie Ripplinger	Guard	5–5	Freshman	Grand Forks, North Dakota
22	Josie Dillon	Forward	6–1	Sophomore	Plymouth, Minnesota
23	Emily Evers	Center	6–5	Junior	Grand Forks, North Dakota
32	Katie Houdek	Forward	6–1	Senior	Grafton, North Dakota
34	Megan Lauck	Forward	6–1	Senior	Shoreview, Minnesota
35	Erin O'Toole	Center	6–3	Freshman	Plymouth, Minnesota
40	Ellen Kiser	Center	6–2	RS freshman	Juda, Wisconsin
52	Allyssa Wall	Center	6–4	Senior	North Sioux City, South Dakota

== Schedule ==
Date time, TV	Rank^{#}	Opponent^{#}	Result	Record	Site (attendance) city, state
Exhibition
11/02/2013*; 2:00 pm		Minnesota Crookston	W 85–66	–	Betty Engelstad Sioux Center (1,770); Grand Forks, ND
11/05/2013*; 7:00 pm		Memidji State	W 78–66	–	Betty Engelstad Sioux Center (1,320); Grand Forks, ND
Regular season
11/10/2013*; 5:00 pm, Cyclones.tv		at No. 20 Iowa State	L 55–84	0–1	Hilton Coliseum (10,072); Ames, IA
11/12/2013*; 7:00 pm		at Northern Iowa	L 56–61	0–2	McLeod Center (2,103); Cedar Falls, IA
11/17/2013*; 2:00 pm, Midco SN		South Dakota	W 65–61	1–2	Betty Engelstad Sioux Center (1,429); Grand Forks, ND
11/26/2013*; 7:00 pm		Jamestown	W 93–56	2–2	Betty Engelstad Sioux Center (1,372); Grand Forks, ND
12/04/2013*; 11:00 am		at Milwaukee	W 78–66	3–2	Klotsche Center (3,500); Milwaukee, WI
12/08/2013*; 2:00 pm		at Minnesota	L 44–46	3–3	Williams Arena (3,568); Minneapolis, MN
12/14/2013*; 2:00 pm, Midco SN		North Dakota State	W 88–83	4–3	Betty Engelstad Sioux Center (2,261); Grand Forks, ND
12/18/2013*; 7:00 pm		Mayville State	W 71–62	5–3	Betty Engelstad Sioux Center (1,352); Grand Forks, ND
12/21/2013; 2:00 pm		at Northern Colorado	W 68–65	6–3 (1–0)	Butler–Hancock Sports Pavilion (581); Greeley, CO
12/28/2013*; 2:00 pm		at No. 21 Iowa	L 62–88	6–4	Carver-Hawkeye Arena (4,209); Iowa City, IA
01/02/2014; 6:00 pm, Midco SN		Southern Utah	W 71–68	7–4 (2–0)	Betty Engelstad Sioux Center (1,480); Grand Forks, ND
01/04/2014; 2:00 pm, Midco SN		Northern Colorado	W 63–51	8–4 (3–0)	Betty Engelstad Sioux Center (1,389); Grand Forks, ND
01/09/2014; 8:00 pm		at Idaho State	W 48–47	9–4 (4–0)	Holt Arena (856); Pocatello, ID
01/11/2014; 3:00 pm		at Weber State	W 83–72	10–4 (5–0)	Dee Events Center (578); Ogden, UT
01/16/2014; 7:00 pm		Montana	W 62–57	11–4 (6–0)	Betty Englestad Sioux Center (1,409); Grand Forks, ND
01/18/2014; 2:00 pm		Montana State	L 65–76	11–5 (6–1)	Betty Englestad Sioux Center (1,639); Grand Forks, ND
01/23/2014; 9:00 pm		at Sacramento State	L 104–110	11–6 (6–2)	Colberg Court (408); Sacramento, CA
01/25/2014; 7:30 pm, FSAZ		at Northern Arizona	W 91–83	12–6 (7–2)	Walkup Skydome (574); Flagstaff, AZ
01/30/2014; 7:00 pm		Eastern Washington	W 82–60	13–6 (8–2)	Betty Englestad Sioux Center (1,401); Grand Forks, ND
02/01/2014; 2:00 pm		Portland State	W 69–44	14–6 (9–2)	Betty Englestad Sioux Center (1,567); Grand Forks, ND
02/06/2014; 7:00 pm		Weber State	W 68–55	15–6 (10–2)	Betty Englestad Sioux Center (1,637); Grand Forks, ND
02/08/2014; 2:00 pm		Idaho State	W 64–59 ^{OT}	16–6 (11–2)	Betty Engelstad Sioux Center (1,847); Grand Forks, ND
02/13/2014; 8:00 pm		at Montana State	L 67–78	16–7 (11–3)	Worthington Arena (N/A); Bozeman, MT
02/15/2014; 3:00 pm		at Montana	L 49–52	16–8 (11–4)	Dahlberg Arena (3,456); Missoula, MT
02/20/2014; 7:00 pm		Northern Arizona	W 71–41	17–8 (12–4)	Betty Engelstad Sioux Center (1,407); Grand Forks, ND
02/22/2014; 2:00 pm, Midco SN		Sacramento State	W 87–57	18–8 (13–4)	Betty Engelstad Sioux Center (1,572); Grand Forks, ND
02/27/2014; 9:00 pm		at Portland State	W 73–52	19–8 (14–4)	Stott Center (489); Portland, OR
03/01/2014; 4:00 pm		at Eastern Washington	W 61–57	20–8 (15–4)	Reese Court (603); Cheney, WA
03/06/2014; 6:00 pm		at Southern Utah	L 53–73	20–9 (15–5)	Centrum Arena (711); Cedar City, UT
Big Sky tournament
03/14/2014; 5:00 pm		vs. Idaho State; Semifinals	W 78–53	21–9	Betty Englestad Sioux Center (1,404); Grand Forks, ND
03/15/2014; 3:00 pm		vs. Montana; Championship	W 72–55	22–9	Betty Englestad Sioux Center (1,937); Grand Forks, ND
NCAA tournament
03/23/2014*; 7:00 pm, ESPN2		at Texas A&M; First Round	L 55–70	22–10	Reed Arena (6,075); College Station, TX
*Non-conference game. ^{#}Rankings from AP Poll. (#) Tournament seedings in parentheses. All times are in Central Time.
