= Lake Tapps, Washington =

Unincorporated community & CDP in Washington, United States

- Unincorporated community Census designated place
- Interactive map of Lake Tapps, Washington
- Coordinates: 47°13′50.4″N 122°10′10.2″W
- Country: United States
- State: Washington
- County: Pierce
- Named for: Lake Tapps

Area
  - Total: 13.0 sq mi (34 km^{2})
  - Land: 12.255 sq mi (31.74 km^{2})
  - Water: 0.745 sq mi (1.93 km^{2})
- Elevation: 541 ft (165 m)

Population (2020)
  - Total: 12,962
  - Density: 1,057.7/sq mi (408.38/km^{2})
- Time zone: UTC-8 (PST)
  - Summer (DST): UTC-7 (PDT)
- Area code(s): 360, 564
- FIPS code: 53-37920
- GNIS feature ID: 2584996

Lake Tapps is an unincorporated community and census-designated place (CDP) in Pierce County, Washington, United States.

== Demographics ==
Historical population
Census	Pop.	Note	%±
2010	11,859		—
2020	12,962		9.3%
U.S. Decennial Census; 2000 2010

Lake Tapps first appeared as a census designated place in the 2010 U.S. census.

=== Racial and ethnic composition ===
Lake Tapps CDP, Washington – Racial and ethnic composition Note: the US Census treats Hispanic/Latino as an ethnic category. This table excludes Latinos from the racial categories and assigns them to a separate category. Hispanics/Latinos may be of any race.
Race / Ethnicity (NH = Non-Hispanic)	Pop 2010	Pop 2020	% 2010	% 2020
White alone (NH)	10,574	10,443	89.16%	80.57%
Black or African American alone (NH)	70	120	0.59%	0.93%
Native American or Alaska Native alone (NH)	65	104	0.55%	0.80%
Asian alone (NH)	239	427	2.02%	3.29%
Native Hawaiian or Pacific Islander alone (NH)	28	53	0.24%	0.41%
Other race alone (NH)	20	51	0.17%	0.39%
Mixed race or Multiracial (NH)	329	958	2.77%	7.39%
Hispanic or Latino (any race)	534	806	4.50%	6.22%
Total	11,859	12,962	100.00%	100.00%
