= 2013–14 UTSA Roadrunners women's basketball team =

Intercollegiate basketball season

2013–14 UTSA Roadrunners women's basketball
- Conference: Conference USA
- Record: 14–17 (4–12 C-USA)
- Head coach: Lubomyr Lichonczak (1st season)
- Assistant coaches: Kristen Holt; Nicole Dunson; Deidra Johnson
- Home arena: Convocation Center

2013–14 Conference USA women's basketball standings
	Conf.				Overall
Team	W		L	PCT	W		L	PCT
No. 22 Middle Tennessee†	15	–	1	.938	29	–	5	.853
Southern Miss	13	–	3	.813	27	–	7	.794
UTEP	12	–	4	.750	29	–	8	.784
Tulane	11	–	5	.688	20	–	11	.645
East Carolina	10	–	6	.625	22	–	9	.710
Charlotte	9	–	7	.563	15	–	16	.484
Old Dominion	9	–	7	.563	18	–	16	.529
UAB	7	–	9	.438	16	–	15	.516
Florida Atlantic	6	–	10	.375	16	–	14	.533
Tulsa	6	–	10	.375	12	–	16	.429
Rice	6	–	10	.375	13	–	17	.433
FIU	6	–	10	.375	15	–	18	.455
North Texas	6	–	10	.375	12	–	18	.400
Louisiana Tech	5	–	11	.313	12	–	20	.375
UTSA	4	–	12	.250	14	–	17	.452
Marshall	3	–	13	.188	11	–	20	.355
† 2014 C-USA tournament winner As of 10:03, 1 April 2014 (UTC); Rankings from AP poll

The 2013–14 UTSA Roadrunners women's basketball team represented the University of Texas at San Antonio during the 2013–14 NCAA Division I women's basketball season. The Roadrunners, led by first-year head coach Lubomyr Lichonczak, played their home games at the Convocation Center and were first-year members of Conference USA.

== Roster ==
Number	Name	Position	Height	Year	Hometown
1	Miki Turner	Guard	5–7	Senior	Houston, Texas
2	Mathilde Hergott	Guard/forward	5–10	Sophomore	Jonage, France
5	Alana Heard	Guard	5–6	Freshman	Missouri City, Texas
10	Kamra King	Guard	5–6	Junior	Norman, Oklahoma
12	Niaga Mitchell-Cole	Guard/forward	5–10	Sophomore	San Antonio, Texas
21	Akunna Elonu	Forward	5–9	Sophomore	Houston, Texas
23	McKenzie Adams	Forward	6–3	Senior	Schertz, Texas
24	Ashley Spaletta	Guard	5–9	Junior	Magnolia, Arkansas
25	Taylor Williams	Forward	6–2	Freshman	Katy, Texas
30	Tesha Smith	Center	6–1	Freshman	San Antonio, Texas
32	Dwanisha Tate	Guard	5–9	Freshman	Arlington, Texas
33	Mannasha Bell	Forward	5–11	Sophomore	Fort Smith, Arkansas
34	Ashley Stephens	Center	6–3	Freshman	Kyle, Texas
35	Destiny Means	Forward/center	6–1	Freshman	Duncanville, Texas
45	Haylee Beard	Guard/forward	5–9	Freshman	Ozark, Missouri

== Schedule ==
Date time, TV	Rank^{#}	Opponent^{#}	Result	Record	Site (attendance) city, state
Regular season
11/10/2013*; 2:00 pm, LONG		at Texas	L 42–63	0–1	Frank Erwin Center (2,534); Austin, TX
11/14/2013*; 7:00 pm		Lamar	L 59–63	0–2	Convocation Center (524); San Antonio, TX
11/17/2013*; 5:00 pm		UT Arlington	W 74–56	1–2	Convocation Center (507); San Antonio, TX
11/21/2013*; 5:00 pm		vs. Northwestern State; Athletes in Action Classic	W 62–49	2–2	Ferrell Center (7,072); Waco, TX
11/22/2013*; 5:00 pm		vs. Savannah State; Athletes in Action Classic	L 50–51	2–3	Ferrell Center (6,445); Waco, TX
11/23/2013*; 7:00 pm		at No. 9 Baylor; Athletes in Action Classic	L 62–92	2–4	Ferrell Center (7,068); Waco, TX
11/29/2013*; 8:00 pm		Northern Iowa; UTSA Thanksgiving Classic	W 63–55	3–4	Convocation Center (314); San Antonio, TX
11/30/2013*; 8:00 pm		Norfolk State; UTSA Thanksgiving Classic	W 72–63 ^{OT}	4–4	Convocation Center (100); San Antonio, TX
12/05/2013*; 7:00 pm		at Texas A&M-Corpus Christi	W 55–50 ^{OT}	5–4	American Bank Center (880); Corpus Christi, TX
12/22/2013*; 1:00 pm		at Texas State	W 86–83	6–4	Strahan Coliseum (987); San Marcos, TX
12/28/2013*; 2:00 pm		North Dakota State; UTSA Holiday Classic	W 79–68	7–4	Convocation Center (508); San Antonio, TX
12/29/2013*; 2:00 pm		New Mexico State; UTSA Holiday Classic	W 65–56	8–4	Convocation Center (491); San Antonio, TX
01/04/2014*; 4:00 pm		Abilene Christian	W 63–58	9–4	Convocation Center (448); San Antonio, TX
01/08/2014; 7:00 pm		Tulsa	L 62–73	9–5 (0–1)	Convocation Center (406); San Antonio, TX
01/11/2014; 4:00 pm, FSN		at Southern Miss	L 55–70	9–6 (0–2)	Reed Green Coliseum (1,240); Hattiesburg, MS
01/15/2014; 7:00 pm		Charlotte	W 61–60	10–6 (1–2)	Convocation Center (608); San Antonio, TX
01/18/2014; 2:00 pm		at North Texas	W 58–56	11–6 (2–2)	The Super Pit (346); Denton, TX
01/22/2014; 7:00 pm		at Middle Tennessee	L 41–60	11–7 (2–3)	Murphy Center (3,205); Murfreesboro, TN
01/25/2014; 7:00 pm		UTEP	L 56–67	11–8 (2–4)	Convocation Center (568); San Antonio, TX
02/01/2014; 6:00 pm		at Louisiana Tech	L 50–71	11–9 (2–5)	Thomas Assembly Center (648); Ruston, LA
02/05/2014; 7:00 pm		FIU	L 40–53	11–10 (2–6)	Convocation Center (413); San Antonio, TX
02/08/2014; 4:00 pm		Tulane	L 54–68	11–11 (2–7)	Convocation Center (910); San Antonio, TX
02/12/2014; 7:00 pm		at UAB	L 56–79	11–12 (2–8)	Bartow Arena (202); Birmingham, AL
02/15/2014; 2:00 pm		at Rice	W 63–61	12–12 (3–8)	Tudor Fieldhouse (743); Houston, TX
02/20/2014; 7:00 pm		East Carolina	W 61–60	13–12 (4–8)	Convocation Center (528); San Antonio, TX
02/22/2014; 7:00 pm		Old Dominion	L 57–67	13–13 (4–9)	Convocation Center (745); San Antonio, TX
02/26/2014; 8:00 pm		at UTEP	L 65–78	13–14 (4–10)	Don Haskins Center (4,003); El Paso, TX
03/01/2014; 4:00 pm		Florida Atlantic	L 69–71	13–15 (4–11)	FAU Arena (502); Boca Raton, FL
03/05/2014; 6:00 pm		at Marshall	L 76–81	13–16 (4–12)	Cam Henderson Center (314); Huntington, WV
C-USA Tournament
03/11/2014; 8:30 pm	(15)	vs. (10) Tulsa; First Round	W 90–89	14–16	Don Haskins Center (942); El Paso, TX
03/12/2014; 8:30 pm	(15)	vs. (7) Old Dominion; Second Round	L 74–79	14–17	Don Haskins Center (1,624); El Paso, TX
*Non-conference game. ^{#}Rankings from AP Poll. (#) Tournament seedings in parentheses. All times are in Central Time.

== See also ==
- 2013–14 UTSA Roadrunners men's basketball team
