= 2013–14 Louisiana–Monroe Warhawks women's basketball team =

American college basketball season

2013–14 Louisiana–Monroe Warhawks women's basketball
- Conference: Sun Belt Conference
- Record: 11–20 (7–11 Sun Belt)
- Head coach: Mona Martin (19th season)
- Assistant coaches: Eun Jung Ok; Gerline Guillaume; Keith Ferguson; Tim Gibson
- Home arena: Fant–Ewing Coliseum

2013–14 Sun Belt Conference women's basketball standings
	Conf.				Overall
Team	W		L	PCT	W		L	PCT
Arkansas State	14	–	4	.778	22	–	12	.647
Western Kentucky †^	13	–	5	.722	24	–	9	.727
Arkansas–Little Rock	12	–	6	.667	18	–	12	.600
Texas State	12	–	6	.667	16	–	16	.500
Troy	8	–	10	.444	12	–	18	.400
Georgia State	8	–	10	.444	12	–	19	.387
Louisiana–Lafayette	7	–	11	.389	14	–	16	.467
Louisiana–Monroe	7	–	11	.389	11	–	20	.355
South Alabama	6	–	12	.333	8	–	20	.286
Texas–Arlington	3	–	15	.167	4	–	25	.138
† 2014 Sun Belt Tournament winner^ NCAA Tournament invited As of 10:03, 1 April 2014 (UTC); Rankings from AP poll

The 2013–14 Louisiana-Monroe Warhawks women's basketball team represented the University of Louisiana at Monroe during the 2013–14 NCAA Division I women's basketball season. The Warhawks, led by 19th year head coach Mona Matin. The Warhawks played their home games at the Fant–Ewing Coliseum and were members of the Sun Belt Conference.

== Roster ==
2013–14 Louisiana–Monroe Warhawks women's basketball team
Players
Coaches

Pos.	#	Name	Height	Year	Previous school	Hometown
C	3	Alayshia Hunter	6 ft 1 in (1.85 m)	So	Ellison HS	Killeen, Texas
G	4	Journee Beard	5 ft 6 in (1.68 m)	Fr	St. Michael HS	Baton Rouge, La.
G	10	Jade Wharton	5 ft 7 in (1.7 m)	Jr	ASA Junior College	Wilmington, Del.
G	12	Alexar Tugler	5 ft 10 in (1.78 m)	Sr	Carroll HS	Monroe, La.
G	15	Ashley Aune	5 ft 8 in (1.73 m)	So	Sacred Heart HS	Church Point, La.
F	20	Ashleigh Simmons	6 ft 1 in (1.85 m)	Sr	Hawkins HS	Hawkins, Texas
G	21	Elexar Tugler	5 ft 9 in (1.75 m)	Sr	Carroll HS	Monroe, La.
G	22	Jasmine Shaw	5 ft 11 in (1.8 m)	Sr	Marcus HS	Flower Mound, Texas
G	23	Aleesha Coulter	5 ft 8 in (1.73 m)	Jr	Cloud County CC	Auckland, New Zealand
G	24	Jasmine Taylor	5 ft 9 in (1.75 m)	So	Denton HS	Denton, Texas
F	32	Christina Gray	5 ft 9 in (1.75 m)	Jr	Winnfield HS	Winnfield, La.
C	34	Sharnice Brooks	6 ft 2 in (1.88 m)	Jr	Bastrop HS	Bastrop, La.
C	40	Tyler Holley	6 ft 2 in (1.88 m)	Jr	Crowley HS	Fort Worth, Texas
F	44	Whitney Wilson	6 ft 0 in (1.83 m)	Jr	Lon Morris Junior College	Seattle

Head coach

Mona Martin

Assistant coach(es)

Eun Jung Ok
Keith Ferguson
Gerline Guillaume

Legend

- (C) Team captain
- (S) Suspended
- (I) Ineligible
- (W) Walk-on
- Injured
- Current redshirt

Roster
Last update: 2013-10-05

== Schedule ==
Date time, TV	Rank^{#}	Opponent^{#}	Result	Record	Site (attendance) city, state
Regular Season
11/09/2013*; 7:00 pm		at TCU	L 47-86	0–1	Daniel–Meyer Coliseum (2,010); Fort Worth, Texas
11/11/2013*; 7:00 pm		Louisiana College	W 92-52	1-1	Fant–Ewing Coliseum (401); Monroe, Louisiana
11/15/2013*; 7:00 pm		Southeastern Louisiana	W 87-77	2-1	Fant–Ewing Coliseum (922); Monroe, Louisiana
11/23/2013*; 12:00 pm		at Central Arkansas	L 56-63 ^{OT}	2-2	Farris Center (549); Conway, Arkansas
11/26/2013*; 5:30 pm		at Ole Miss	L 72-78	2-3	Tad Smith Coliseum (6,511); Oxford, Mississippi
12/08/2013*; 2:00 pm		Stephen F. Austin	W 85-83	3-3	Fant–Ewing Coliseum (828); Monroe, Louisiana
12/11/2013*; 7:00 pm		at McNeese State	L 63-78	3-4	Burton Coliseum (457); Lake Charles, Louisiana
12/13/2013*; 7:30 pm		Grand Canyon; Warhawk Classic	L 72-82	3-5	Fant–Ewing Coliseum (828); Monroe, Louisiana
12/14/2013*; 5:00 pm		Alcorn State; Warhawk Classic	W 92-54	4-5	Fant–Ewing Coliseum (834); Monroe, Louisiana
12/19/2013*; 4:30 pm		vs. Washington; Duel in the Desert	L 77-81	4-6	Cox Pavilion (826); Paradise, Nevada
12/20/2013*; 2:00 pm		vs. Pittsburgh; Duel in the Desert	L 61-76	4-7	Cox Pavilion (753); Paradise, Nevada
12/21/2013*; 4:30 pm		vs. DePaul; Duel in the Desert	L 57-79	4-8	Cox Pavilion (862); Paradise, Nevada
Conference Schedule
01/04/2014; 2:00 pm		Louisiana–Lafayette	L 49-68	4-9 (0-1)	Fant–Ewing Coliseum (1,482); Monroe, Louisiana
01/08/2014; 7:30 pm		at UT-Arlington	W 84-67	5-9 (1-1)	College Park Center (636); Arlington, Texas
01/11/2014; 2:00 pm		Texas State	W 78-52	6-9 (2-1)	Fant–Ewing Coliseum (1,106); Monroe, Louisiana
01/16/2014; 5:15 pm		at Troy	W 83-72	7-9 (3-1)	Trojan Arena (532); Troy, Alabama
01/18/2014; 5:00 pm, ESPN3/Sun Belt Network		at South Alabama	L 70-72	7-10 (3-2)	Mitchell Center (2,385); Mobile, Alabama
01/22/2014; 7:00 pm		Western Kentucky	L 73-77	7-11 (3-3)	Fant–Ewing Coliseum (960); Monroe, Louisiana
01/25/2014; 2:00 pm		Georgia State	L 66-77	7-12 (3-4)	Fant–Ewing Coliseum (1,682); Monroe, Louisiana
01/29/2014; 7:00 pm		Arkansas State	L 68-80	7-13 (3-5)	Fant–Ewing Coliseum (912); Monroe, Louisiana
02/01/2014; 5:00 pm		at Louisiana-Lafayette	W 66-59	8-13 (4-5)	Cajundome (715); Lafayette, Louisiana
02/05/2014; 7:00 pm		at Texas State	L 70-75	8-14 (4-6)	Strahan Coliseum (1,255); San Marcos, Texas
02/12/2014; 7:05 pm		UT-Arlington	W 70-65	9-14 (5-6)	Fant–Ewing Coliseum (954); Monroe, Louisiana
02/15/2014; 12:00 pm		Arkansas-Little Rock	L 47-63	9-15 (5-7)	Fant–Ewing Coliseum (-); Monroe, Louisiana
02/19/2014; 6:00 pm		at Georgia State	L 77-85	9-16 (5-8)	GSU Sports Arena (427); Atlanta, Georgia
02/22/2014; 2:00 pm, ESPN3		at Western Kentucky	L 63-92	9-17 (5-9)	E. A. Diddle Arena (1,176); Bowling Green, Kentucky
02/26/2014; 7:00 pm		South Alabama	W 76-70	10-17 (6-9)	Fant–Ewing Coliseum (921); Monroe, Louisiana
03/01/2014; 2:00 pm		Troy	W 91-87	11-17 (7-9)	Fant–Ewing Coliseum (-); Monroe, Louisiana
03/05/2014; 7:05 pm		at Arkansas State	L 57-107	11-18 (7-10)	Convocation Center (1,076); Jonesboro, Arkansas
03/08/2014; 4:30 pm		at Arkansas-Little Rock	L 62-72	11-19 (7-11)	Jack Stephens Center (4,437); Little Rock, Arkansas
2014 Sun Belt Conference Tournament
03/12/2014; 12:00 pm		vs. Arkansas State; First Round	L 69-78	11-20 (7-12)	Lakefront Arena (499); New Orleans, Louisiana
*Non-conference game. ^{#}Rankings from AP Poll. (#) Tournament seedings in parentheses. All times are in Central Time.

== See also ==
2013–14 Louisiana–Monroe Warhawks men's basketball team
