= 2013–14 UTEP Miners women's basketball team =

Intercollegiate basketball season

2013–14 UTEP Miners women's basketball

WNIT, Runners Up
- Conference: Conference USA
- Record: 29–8 (12–4 C-USA)
- Head coach: Keitha Adams (13th season)
- Assistant coaches: Ewa Laskowska; Bill Damuth
- Home arena: Don Haskins Center

2013–14 Conference USA women's basketball standings
	Conf.				Overall
Team	W		L	PCT	W		L	PCT
No. 22 Middle Tennessee†	15	–	1	.938	29	–	5	.853
Southern Miss	13	–	3	.813	27	–	7	.794
UTEP	12	–	4	.750	29	–	8	.784
Tulane	11	–	5	.688	20	–	11	.645
East Carolina	10	–	6	.625	22	–	9	.710
Charlotte	9	–	7	.563	15	–	16	.484
Old Dominion	9	–	7	.563	18	–	16	.529
UAB	7	–	9	.438	16	–	15	.516
Florida Atlantic	6	–	10	.375	16	–	14	.533
Tulsa	6	–	10	.375	12	–	16	.429
Rice	6	–	10	.375	13	–	17	.433
FIU	6	–	10	.375	15	–	18	.455
North Texas	6	–	10	.375	12	–	18	.400
Louisiana Tech	5	–	11	.313	12	–	20	.375
UTSA	4	–	12	.250	14	–	17	.452
Marshall	3	–	13	.188	11	–	20	.355
† 2014 C-USA tournament winner As of 10:03, 1 April 2014 (UTC); Rankings from AP poll

The 2013–14 UTEP Miners women's basketball team represented the University of Texas at El Paso during the 2013–14 NCAA Division I women's basketball season. The Miners, led by 13th year head coach Keitha Adams, played their home games at the Don Haskins Center and were members of Conference USA. They finished the season with a record of 29–8 overall, 12–4 in C-USA play for a third-place finish. They lost in the semifinals in the 2014 Conference USA women's basketball tournament to Southern Miss. They were invited to the 2014 Women's National Invitation Tournament, where they defeated Arkansas State in the first round, St. Mary's in the second round, Colorado in the third round, Washington in the quarterfinals and South Dakota State in the semifinals before losing to Rutgers in the championship game.

== Roster ==
Number	Name	Position	Height	Year	Hometown
2	Cameasha Turner	Guard	5–9	Sophomore	Dallas, Texas
3	Kelli Willingham	Guard	5–6	Senior	DeSoto, Texas
4	Irene Gari	Forward/Guard	6–1	Sophomore	Oliva, Spain
5	Kayla Thornton	Forward	6–1	Senior	El Paso, Texas
10	Stacie Telles	Guard	5–7	Junior	El Paso, Texas
12	Sparkle Taylor	Guard	5–10	Freshman	Flint, Michigan
13	Marissa Rodriguez	Guard	5–7	Junior	San Antonio, Texas
14	Kristine Vitola	Center	6–4	RS Senior	Riga, Latvia
15	Agata Dobrowolska	Forward	6–3	Sophomore	Lublin, Poland
24	Jenzel Nash	Guard	5–7	RS Sophomore	Houston, Texas
25	Anete Kirsteine	Guard	5–11	Sophomore	Riga, Latvia
30	Johni Welles	Forward	6–0	Junior	Phoenix, Arizona
32	Chrishauna Parker	Guard	5–10	Junior	Houston, Texas
33	Anzhelika Moiseychenko	Forward	6–0	Freshman	Krasnoyarsk Krai, Russia
34	Marta Oledzka	Forward	6–6	Junior	Lapy, Poland

== Schedule ==
Date time, TV	Rank^{#}	Opponent^{#}	Result	Record	Site (attendance) city, state
Exhibition
11/02/2013*; 4:30 pm		St. Mary's	W 81–51	-	Don Haskins Center (936); El Paso, TX
Regular Season
11/08/2013*; 7:05 pm		UT Permian Basin	W 75–58	1–0	Don Haskins Center (910); El Paso, TX
11/12/2013*; 7:05 pm		New Mexico State; The Battle of I-10	W 94–69	2–0	Don Haskins Center (1,505); El Paso, TX
11/16/2013*; 2:00 pm		Kansas State	W 84–39	3–0	Don Haskins Center (1,061); El Paso, TX
11/22/2013*; 7:05 pm		Northern Arizona	W 92–43	4–0	Don Haskins Center (N/A); El Paso, TX
11/27/2013*; 7:05 pm		Northern Colorado	W 63–40	5–0	Don Haskins Center (1,088); El Paso, TX
11/30/2013*; 7:05 pm		Texas State	W 73–60	6–0	Don Haskins Center (1,353); El Paso, TX
12/03/2013*; 7:05 pm, ESPN3		at New Mexico State; The Battle of I-10	W 80–61	7–0	Pan American Center (514); Las Cruces, NM
12/07/2013*; 4:30 pm		SMU	W 76–71	8–0	Don Haskins Center (2,387); El Paso, TX
12/15/2013*; 2:00 pm		Southeastern Louisiana	W 87–65	9–0	Don Haskins Center (1,024); El Paso, TX
12/20/2013*; 3:00 pm		vs. Georgia Tech; Puerto Rico Classic	L 77–102	9–1	Roberto Clemente Coliseum (287); San Juan, Puerto Rico
12/21/2013*; 12:30 pm		vs. Belmont; Puerto Rico Classic	W 88–74	10–1	Roberto Clemente Coliseum (312); San Juan, Puerto Rico
12/29/2013*; 2:00 pm		Texas Southern	W 87–61	11–1	Don Haskins Center (1,505); El Paso, TX
01/02/2014*; 5:00 pm		at Texas A&M	L 58–74	11–2	Reed Arena (4,052); College Station, TX
01/08/2014; 6:00 pm		at UAB	W 85–76	12–2 (1–0)	Bartow Arena (246); Birmingham, AL
01/11/2014; 1:30 pm		Tulsa	W 97–66	13–2 (2–0)	Don Haskins Center (2,405); El Paso, TX
01/15/2014; 6:00 pm		at Middle Tennessee	L 58–69	13–3 (2–1)	Murphy Center (3,724); Murfreesboro, TN
01/18/2014; 7:05 pm		Charlotte	L 86–92	13–4 (2–2)	Don Haskins Center (2,503); El Paso, TX
01/22/2014; 7:05 pm		Southern Miss	W 86–85 ^{OT}	14–4 (3–2)	Don Haskins Center (1,532); El Paso, TX
01/25/2014; 3:00 pm		at UTSA	W 67–56	15–4 (4–2)	Convocation Center (568); San Antonio, TX
01/29/2014; 7:05 pm		Marshall	W 77–50	16–4 (5–2)	Don Haskins Center (1,256); El Paso, TX
02/01/2014; 12:00 pm		at Tulane	W 86–72	17–4 (6–2)	Devlin Fieldhouse (764); New Orleans, LA
02/05/2014; 7:05 pm		Louisiana Tech	W 85–75	18–4 (7–2)	Don Haskins Center (N/A); El Paso, TX
02/08/2014; 7:05 pm		FIU	W 83–62	19–4 (8–2)	Don Haskins Center (5,102); El Paso, TX
02/15/2014; 5:00 pm		at Old Dominion	W 65–55	20–4 (9–2)	Ted Constant Convocation Center (3,972); Norfolk, VA
02/19/2014; 6:00 pm		at North Texas	L 64–73	20–5 (9–3)	The Super Pit (349); Denton, TX
02/22/2014; 7:05 pm		East Carolina	W 81–74	21–5 (10–3)	Don Haskins Center (5,568); El Paso, TX
02/26/2014; 7:05 pm		UTSA	W 78–65	22–5 (11–3)	Don Haskins Center (4,003); El Paso, TX
03/01/2014; 10:00 am, FSN		at Rice	W 72–57	23–5 (12–3)	Tudor Fieldhouse (562); Houston, TX
03/05/2014; 5:00 pm		at Florida Atlantic	L 62–98	23–6 (12–4)	FAU Arena (508); Boca Raton, FL
2014 Conference USA women's basketball tournament
03/13/2014; 5:00 pm		Louisiana Tech; Quarterfinals	W 81–72	24–6	Memorial Gym (N/A); El Paso, TX
03/14/2014; 11:00 am		Southern Miss; Semifinals	L 70–84	24–7	Don Haskins Center (3,244); El Paso, TX
2014 Women's National Invitation Tournament
03/21/2014*; 7:00 pm		Arkansas State; First Round	W 84–74	25–7	Don Haskins Center (4,500); El Paso, TX
03/24/2014*; 7:00 pm		Saint Mary's; Second Round	W 76–64	26–7	Don Haskins Center (4,703); El Paso, TX
03/28/2014*; 7:00 pm		Colorado; Third Round	W 68–60	27–7	Don Haskins Center (8,234); El Paso, TX
03/31/2014*; 7:00 pm		Washington; Quarterfinals	W 70–63	28–7	Don Haskins Center (10,227); El Paso, TX
04/02/2014*; 7:00 pm		South Dakota State; Semifinals	W 66–63	29–7	Don Haskins Center (12,222); El Paso, TX
04/05/2014*; 1:00 pm, CBSSN		Rutgers; Championship Game	L 54–56	29–8	Don Haskins Center (12,222); El Paso, TX
*Non-conference game. ^{#}Rankings from AP Poll. (#) Tournament seedings in parentheses. All times are in Mountain Time.

== See also ==
2013–14 UTEP Miners basketball team
