= 2014 Conference USA women's basketball tournament =

- Classification: Division I
- Season: 2013–14
- Teams: 16
- Site: Memorial Gym; Don Haskins Center; El Paso, Texas
- Television: CBS Sports Network

2013–14 Conference USA women's basketball standings
	Conf.				Overall
Team	W		L	PCT	W		L	PCT
No. 22 Middle Tennessee†	15	–	1	.938	29	–	5	.853
Southern Miss	13	–	3	.813	27	–	7	.794
UTEP	12	–	4	.750	29	–	8	.784
Tulane	11	–	5	.688	20	–	11	.645
East Carolina	10	–	6	.625	22	–	9	.710
Charlotte	9	–	7	.563	15	–	16	.484
Old Dominion	9	–	7	.563	18	–	16	.529
UAB	7	–	9	.438	16	–	15	.516
Florida Atlantic	6	–	10	.375	16	–	14	.533
Tulsa	6	–	10	.375	12	–	16	.429
Rice	6	–	10	.375	13	–	17	.433
FIU	6	–	10	.375	15	–	18	.455
North Texas	6	–	10	.375	12	–	18	.400
Louisiana Tech	5	–	11	.313	12	–	20	.375
UTSA	4	–	12	.250	14	–	17	.452
Marshall	3	–	13	.188	11	–	20	.355
† 2014 C-USA tournament winner As of 10:03, 1 April 2014 (UTC); Rankings from AP poll

The 2014 Conference USA women's basketball tournament is the postseason women's basketball tournament for Conference USA that was held from March 11–15, 2014 in El Paso, Texas. The three rounds took place at the Memorial Gym while the semifinals and championship took place at Don Haskins Center.

== Schedule ==
Game	Time*	Matchup^{#}	Television	Attendance
First round – Tuesday, March 11
1	11:00 am	#16 Marshall vs #9 Florida Atlantic	C-USA DN	
2	1:30 pm	#13 FIU vs #12 Rice	C-USA DN	
3	5:00 pm	#14 Louisiana Tech vs. #11 North Texas	C-USA DN	
4	7:30 pm	#15 UTSA vs. #10 Tulsa	C-USA DN	
Second round – Wednesday, March 12
5	11:00 am	#8 UAB vs #16 Marshall	C-USA DN	
6	1:30 pm	#5 East Carolina vs #13 FIU	C-USA DN	
7	5:00 pm	#6 Charlotte vs #14 Louisiana Tech	C-USA DN	
8	7:30 pm	#7 Old Dominion vs. #15 UTSA	C-USA DN	
Quarterfinals – Thursday, March 13
9	11:00 am	#1 Middle Tennessee vs Game 5 winner	C-USA DN	
10	1:30 pm	#4 Tulane vs Game 6 winner	C-USA DN	
11	5:00 pm	#3 UTEP vs Game 7 winner	C-USA DN	
12	7:30 pm	#2 Southern Miss vs Game 8 winner	C-USA DN	
Semifinals – Friday, March 14
13	9:00 am	Game 9 winner vs Game 10 winner	CBSSN	
14	11:30 am	Game 11 winner vs Game 12 winner	CBSSN	
Championship – Saturday, March 15
15	6:00 pm	Game 13 winner vs. Game 14 winner	CBSSN	
*Game times in MT. #-Rankings denote tournament seed

== Bracket ==
First round Tuesday, March 11
9	Florida Atlantic	73
16	Marshall	80
12	Rice	65
13	FIU	85
10	Tulsa	89
15	UTSA	90
11	North Texas	59
14	Louisiana Tech	77

Second round Wednesday, March 12
1	Middle Tennessee
(bye)
8	UAB	79
16	Marshall	63
4	Tulane
(bye)
5	East Carolina	75
13	FIU	87
2	Southern Miss
(bye)
7	Old Dominion	79
15	UTSA	74
3	UTEP
(bye)
6	Charlotte	55
14	Louisiana Tech	64

Quarterfinals; Thursday, March 13
1	Middle Tennessee	69
8	UAB	59
4	Tulane	55
13	FIU	69
2	Southern Miss	83
7	Old Dominion	64
3	UTEP	81
14	Louisiana Tech	72

Semifinals; Friday, March 14
1	Middle Tennessee	64
13	FIU	57
2	Southern Miss	84
3	UTEP	70

Championship; Saturday, March 15
1	Middle Tennessee	84
2	Southern Miss	55

All times listed were Mountain
