= 2013–14 Rice Owls women's basketball team =

Intercollegiate basketball season

2013–14 Rice Owls women's basketball
- Conference: Conference USA
- Record: 13–17 (6–10 C-USA)
- Head coach: Greg Williams (8th season)
- Assistant coaches: Jae Kingi-Cross; Shane Laflin; Bianca Smith
- Home arena: Tudor Fieldhouse

2013–14 Conference USA women's basketball standings
	Conf.				Overall
Team	W		L	PCT	W		L	PCT
No. 22 Middle Tennessee†	15	–	1	.938	29	–	5	.853
Southern Miss	13	–	3	.813	27	–	7	.794
UTEP	12	–	4	.750	29	–	8	.784
Tulane	11	–	5	.688	20	–	11	.645
East Carolina	10	–	6	.625	22	–	9	.710
Charlotte	9	–	7	.563	15	–	16	.484
Old Dominion	9	–	7	.563	18	–	16	.529
UAB	7	–	9	.438	16	–	15	.516
Florida Atlantic	6	–	10	.375	16	–	14	.533
Tulsa	6	–	10	.375	12	–	16	.429
Rice	6	–	10	.375	13	–	17	.433
FIU	6	–	10	.375	15	–	18	.455
North Texas	6	–	10	.375	12	–	18	.400
Louisiana Tech	5	–	11	.313	12	–	20	.375
UTSA	4	–	12	.250	14	–	17	.452
Marshall	3	–	13	.188	11	–	20	.355
† 2014 C-USA tournament winner As of 10:03, 1 April 2014 (UTC); Rankings from AP poll

The 2013–14 Rice Owls women's basketball team represented Rice University during the 2013–14 NCAA Division I women's basketball season. The Owls, led by eighth-year head coach Greg Williams, played their home games at the Tudor Fieldhouse and were members of Conference USA. They finished the season with a record of 13–17 overall, 6–10 in C-USA play for a three-way tie for ninth place. They lost in the first round of the 2014 Conference USA women's basketball tournament to FIU.

== Roster ==
Number	Name	Position	Height	Year	Hometown
0	Breion Allen	Guard	5–9	Sophomore	Hoover, Alabama
3	Maya Hawkins	Guard	5–6	Freshman	Mansfield, Texas
5	Reem Moussa	Guard	5–5	Junior	Coppell, Texas
15	Megan Shafer	Forward	6–0	Junior	The Woodlands, Texas
21	Nakachi Maduka	Guard	5–11	Junior	Arlington, Texas
22	Maya Adetula	Guard	5–10	Junior	Mansfield, Texas
24	Elena Gumbs	Guard	5–5	Sophomore	Cibolo, Texas
30	Jessica Kuster	Forward	6–2	Senior	San Antonio, Texas
31	Christal Porter	Post	6–0	Junior	Germantown, Tennessee
32	Alyssa Lang	Post	6–1	Sophomore	Rockwall, Texas
33	Jasmine Goodwine	Forward	6–1	Freshman	Killeen, Texas
40	Megan Palmer	Forward	6–1	Sophomore	Katy, Texas
44	Adaeze Obinnah	Post	6–1	Sophomore	Aurora, Colorado

== Schedule ==
Date time, TV	Rank^{#}	Opponent^{#}	Result	Record	Site (attendance) city, state
Regular season
11/08/2013*; 7:00 pm		at Prairie View A&M	W 77–63	1–0	William Nicks Building (1,786); Prairie View, TX
11/11/2013*; 7:00 pm		Texas Southern	W 61–54	2–0	Tudor Fieldhouse (484); Houston, TX
11/14/2013*; 7:00 pm		at McNeese State	L 54–65	2–1	Burton Coliseum (719); Lake Charles, LA
11/18/2013*; 7:00 pm, FSSW+		at No. 9 Baylor	L 46–79	2–2	Ferrell Center (6,516); Waco, TX
11/21/2013*; 7:00 pm		Southern	W 77–64	3–2	Tudor Fieldhouse (288); Houston, TX
11/23/2013*; 6:30 pm		at No. 21 Michigan State	L 68–81	3–3	Breslin Student Events Center (5,850); East Lansing, MI
11/26/2013*; 7:00 pm		Sam Houston State	L 74–79 ^{OT}	3–4	Tudor Fieldhouse (427); Houston, TX
11/29/2013*; 6:00 pm		vs. Samford; Omni Hotels Classic	W 57–52	4–4	Coors Events Center (2,302); Boulder, CO
11/30/2013*; 8:30 pm		at Colorado; Omni Hotels Classic	L 58–75	4–5	Coors Events Center (2,171); Boulder, CO
12/05/2013*; 7:00 pm		Texas State	W 74–61	5–5	Tudor Fieldhouse (333); Houston, TX
12/20/2013*; 1:00 pm		vs. Houston; Lone Star Showcase	L 54–67	5–6	Tudor Fieldhouse (311); Houston, TX
12/29/2013*; 2:00 pm		at Lamar	W 67–64	6–6	Montagne Center (608); Beaumont, TX
01/03/2014*; 7:00 pm		Incarnate Word	W 72–57	7–6	Tudor Fieldhouse (393); Houston, TX
01/08/2014; 5:00 pm		at Florida International	W 59–41	8–6 (1–0)	U.S. Century Bank Arena (409); Miami, FL
01/11/2014; 4:00 pm		at Florida Atlantic	L 68–97	8–7 (1–1)	FAU Arena (435); Boca Raton, FL
01/15/2014; 7:00 pm		Louisiana Tech	W 82–68	9–7 (2–1)	Tudor Fieldhouse (426); Houston, TX
01/18/2014; 2:00 pm		Marshall	W 74–68	10–7 (3–1)	Tudor Fieldhouse (550); Houston, TX
01/22/2014; 6:00 pm		at East Carolina	L 47–53	10–8 (3–2)	Williams Arena at Minges Coliseum (794); Greenville, NC
01/25/2014; 6:00 pm		at Charlotte	L 53–58	10–9 (3–3)	Dale F. Halton Arena (928); Charlotte, NC
01/29/2014; 7:00 pm		Tulane	L 55–62	10–10 (3–4)	Tudor Fieldhouse (402); Houston, TX
02/01/2014; 2:00 pm		Southern Miss	L 58–74	10–11 (3–5)	Tudor Fieldhouse (498); Houston, TX
02/08/2014; 2:00 pm		at No. 25 Middle Tennessee	L 54–65	10–12 (3–6)	Murphy Center (4,209); Murfreesboro, TN
02/12/2014; 7:00 pm		at Tulsa	W 75–59	11–12 (4–6)	Reynolds Center (486); Tulsa, OK
02/15/2014; 2:00 pm		UTSA	L 61–63	11–13 (4–7)	Tudor Fieldhouse (743); Houston, TX
02/19/2014; 7:00 pm		Old Dominion	L 49–85	11–14 (4–8)	Tudor Fieldhouse (261); Houston, TX
02/22/2014; 6:00 pm		at Louisiana Tech	W 61–56	12–14 (5–8)	Thomas Assembly Center (674); Ruston, LA
02/26/2014; 7:00 pm		North Texas	L 52–66	12–15 (5–9)	Tudor Fieldhouse (334); Houston, TX
03/01/2014; 11:00 am, FSN		UTEP	L 57–72	12–16 (5–10)	Tudor Fieldhouse (562); Houston, TX
03/05/2014; 7:00 pm		at UAB	W 61–51	13–16 (6–10)	Bartow Arena (334); Birmingham, AL
2014 Conference USA women's basketball tournament
03/11/2014; 2:30 pm		vs. FIU; First Round	L 65–85	13–17	Memorial Gym (1,842); El Paso, TX
*Non-conference game. ^{#}Rankings from AP Poll. (#) Tournament seedings in parentheses. All times are in Central Time.

== See also ==
- 2013–14 Rice Owls men's basketball team
