= 2013–14 Old Dominion Monarchs women's basketball team =

Intercollegiate basketball season

2013–14 Old Dominion Monarchs women's basketball

WNIT, Second Round
- Conference: Conference USA
- Record: 18–16 (9–7 C-USA)
- Head coach: Karen Barefoot (3rd season)
- Assistant coaches: Richard Fortune; Jim Corrigan
- Home arena: Ted Constant Convocation Center

2013–14 Conference USA women's basketball standings
	Conf.				Overall
Team	W		L	PCT	W		L	PCT
No. 22 Middle Tennessee†	15	–	1	.938	29	–	5	.853
Southern Miss	13	–	3	.813	27	–	7	.794
UTEP	12	–	4	.750	29	–	8	.784
Tulane	11	–	5	.688	20	–	11	.645
East Carolina	10	–	6	.625	22	–	9	.710
Charlotte	9	–	7	.563	15	–	16	.484
Old Dominion	9	–	7	.563	18	–	16	.529
UAB	7	–	9	.438	16	–	15	.516
Florida Atlantic	6	–	10	.375	16	–	14	.533
Tulsa	6	–	10	.375	12	–	16	.429
Rice	6	–	10	.375	13	–	17	.433
FIU	6	–	10	.375	15	–	18	.455
North Texas	6	–	10	.375	12	–	18	.400
Louisiana Tech	5	–	11	.313	12	–	20	.375
UTSA	4	–	12	.250	14	–	17	.452
Marshall	3	–	13	.188	11	–	20	.355
† 2014 C-USA tournament winner As of 10:03, 1 April 2014 (UTC); Rankings from AP poll

The 2013–14 Old Dominion Monarchs women's basketball team represented Old Dominion University during the 2013–14 NCAA Division I women's basketball season. The Monarchs, led by third year head coach Karen Barefoot, played their home games at Ted Constant Convocation Center and were first-year members of Conference USA.

The Monarchs finished the season 18–16, 9–7 in C-USA play to finish in a two-way tie for sixth place. They advanced to the semifinals of the C-USA women's tournament where they lost to WKU. They were invited to the Women's National Invitation Tournament where they defeated Navy in the first round before losing to Auburn in the second round.

== Roster ==
2013–14 Old Dominion Monarchs women's basketball team
Players
Coaches

Pos.	#	Name	Height	Year	Previous school	Hometown
G	0	Stephanie Gardner	5 ft 7 in (1.7 m)	Sr	Glassboro HS	Glassboro, New Jersey
F	1	Shae Kelley	6 ft 1 in (1.85 m)	Jr	Denver East HS	Denver, Colorado
G	2	Michelle Brandao	5 ft 10 in (1.78 m)	Sr	Polytechnic Institute of Coimbra	Ponte de Lima, Portugal
F	3	Chelisa Painter	6 ft 1 in (1.85 m)	RS Jr	Indian River HS	Chesapeake, Virginia
G	4	Becca Allison	5 ft 8 in (1.73 m)	RS Sr	Portobello HS	Edinburgh, Scotland
G	11	Ashley Betz-White	5 ft 4 in (1.63 m)	RS So	Trinity HS	Mechanicsburg, Pennsylvania
F	14	Annika Holopainen	6 ft 1 in (1.85 m)	RS Fr	Makelanrinteen Lukio	Helsinki, Finland
C	23	Ije Ajemba	6 ft 3 in (1.91 m)	Fr	Parkdale HS	Lanham, Maryland
G	24	LaQuanda Younger	5 ft 10 in (1.78 m)	So	Warwick HS	Newport News, Virginia
F	25	Jennie Simms	6 ft 0 in (1.83 m)	RS Fr	Riverdale Baptist School	Accokeek, Maryland
F	32	Tiffany Minor	6 ft 0 in (1.83 m)	Jr	Maret School	Upper Marlboro, Maryland
F	34	Odegua Oigbokie	6 ft 1 in (1.85 m)	Fr	Ridgeway HS	Memphis, Tennessee
F	40	Destinee Young	6 ft 1 in (1.85 m)	Fr	Hoffman Estates HS	Hoffman Estates, Illinois
F	53	Shakeva Richards	6 ft 2 in (1.88 m)	Sr	Spalding HS	Griffin, Georgia

Head coach

- Karen Barefoot (Christopher Newport)

Assistant coach(es)

- Richard Fortune
- Jim Corrigan

Legend

- (C) Team captain
- (S) Suspended
- (I) Ineligible
- (W) Walk-on
- Injured
- Current redshirt

Roster
Last update: February 12, 2024

== Schedule ==
Date time, TV	Rank^{#}	Opponent^{#}	Result	Record	Site (attendance) city, state
Non-conference regular season
November 9, 2013*; 2:00 p.m.		Delaware State	W 97–67	1–0	Ted Constant Center; Norfolk, VA
November 11, 2013*; 7:00 p.m.		Virginia Tech	L 61–73	1–1	Ted Constant Center; Norfolk, VA
November 17, 2013*; 2:00 p.m.		Radford	W 56–37	2–1	Ted Constant Center; Norfolk, VA
November 22, 2013*; 8:00 p.m.		at Ohio State; Basketball Hall of Fame Challenge	L 60–75	2–2	Value City Arena (5,335); Columbus, OH
November 23, 2013*; 6:00 p.m.		vs. Bowling Green; Basketball Hall of Fame Challenge	L 58–77	2–3	Value City Arena; Columbus, OH
November 24, 2013*; 1:00 p.m.		vs. Marist; Basketball Hall of Fame Challenge	L 82–87 ^{OT}	2–4	Value City Arena; Columbus, OH
December 1, 2013*; 12:15 p.m.		vs. Boston University; Basketball Hall of Fame Challenge	W 62–56	3–4	MassMutual Center; Springfield, MA
December 4, 2013*; 11:00 a.m.		UMass Lowell	W 90–57	4–4	Ted Constant Center; Norfolk, VA
December 7, 2013*; 7:00 p.m.		Maryland Eastern Shore	W 82–57	5–4	Ted Constant Center; Norfolk, VA
December 15, 2013*; 2:00 p.m.		at Pittsburgh	L 49–63	5–5	Petersen Events Center (1,054); Pittsburgh, PA
December 21, 2013*; 2:00 p.m.		at William & Mary; Rivalry	W 60–49	6–5	Kaplan Arena; Williamsburg, VA
December 30, 2013*; 6:00 p.m.		at VCU; Rivalry	L 68–81	6–6	Siegel Center; Richmond, VA
January 2, 2014*; 6:30 p.m.		at No. 3 Duke	L 63–87	6–7	Cameron Indoor Stadium (4,450); Durham, NC
January 5, 2014*; 2:00 p.m.		North Carolina Central	W 68–44	7–7	Ted Constant Center; Norfolk, VA
C-USA regular season
January 8, 2014; 7:00 p.m.		at Charlotte	L 59–80	7–8 (0–1)	Dale F. Halton Arena; Charlotte, NC
January 11, 2014; 2:00 p.m.		Tulane	L 62–92	7–9 (0–2)	Ted Constant Center; Norfolk, VA
January 15, 2014; 8:00 p.m.		at Southern Miss	W 92–82	8–9 (1–2)	Reed Green Coliseum; Hattiesburg, MS
January 18, 2014; 7:00 p.m.		Florida Atlantic	W 80–44	9–9 (2–2)	Ted Constant Center; Norfolk, VA
January 22, 2014; 7:00 p.m.		UAB	L 64–80	9–10 (2–3)	Ted Constant Center; Norfolk, VA
January 25, 2014; 5:00 p.m., COX 114		at Middle Tennessee	L 49–62	9–11 (2–4)	Murphy Center (3,806); Murfreesboro, TN
January 30, 2014; 2:00 p.m.		at East Carolina	L 63–64	9–12 (2–5)	Williams Arena; Greenville, NC
February 1, 2014; 7:00 p.m.		Marshall	W 65–52	10–12 (3–5)	Ted Constant Center; Norfolk, VA
February 5, 2014; 7:00 p.m.		Tulsa	W 65–53	11–12 (4–5)	Ted Constant Center; Norfolk, VA
February 8, 2014; 3:00 p.m.		at North Texas	L 52–68	11–13 (4–6)	The Super Pit (578); Denton, TX
February 15, 2014; 7:00 p.m., COX 11		UTEP	L 55–65	11–14 (4–7)	Ted Constant Center (3,972); Norfolk, VA
February 19, 2014; 8:00 p.m.		at Rice	W 85–49	12–14 (5–7)	Tudor Fieldhouse (261); Houston, TX
February 22, 2014; 8:00 p.m.		at UTSA	W 68–57	13–14 (6–7)	Convocation Center (745); San Antonio, TX
February 26, 2014; 7:00 p.m.		Louisiana Tech	W 75–64	14–14 (7–7)	Ted Constant Center; Norfolk, VA
March 1, 2014; 6:00 p.m.		at FIU	W 72–56	15–14 (8–7)	FIU Arena; Miami, FL
March 5, 2014; 7:00 p.m.		East Carolina	W 87–78	16–14 (9–7)	Ted Constant Center; Norfolk, VA
C-USA tournament
March 12, 2014; 7:30 p.m., C-USA DN	(7)	vs. (15) UTSA; Quarterfinals	W 79–74	17–14	Don Haskins Center (1,624); El Paso, TX
March 13, 2014; 7:30 p.m., C-USA DN	(7)	vs. (2) Southern Miss; Second round	L 64–83	17–15	Don Haskins Center (N/A); El Paso, TX
WNIT
March 20, 2014*; 7:00 p.m.		Navy; First round	W 68–60	18–15	Ted Constant Center; Norfolk, VA
March 24, 2014*; 7:00 p.m.		at Auburn; Second round	L 59–82	18–16	Auburn Arena; Auburn, AL
*Non-conference game. ^{#}Rankings from AP Poll. (#) Tournament seedings in parentheses. All times are in Eastern Time.

- Source: Old Dominion Athletics

== See also ==
- 2013–14 Old Dominion Monarchs men's basketball team
