= 2013–14 North Texas Mean Green women's basketball team =

American college basketball season

2013–14 North Texas Mean Green women's basketball
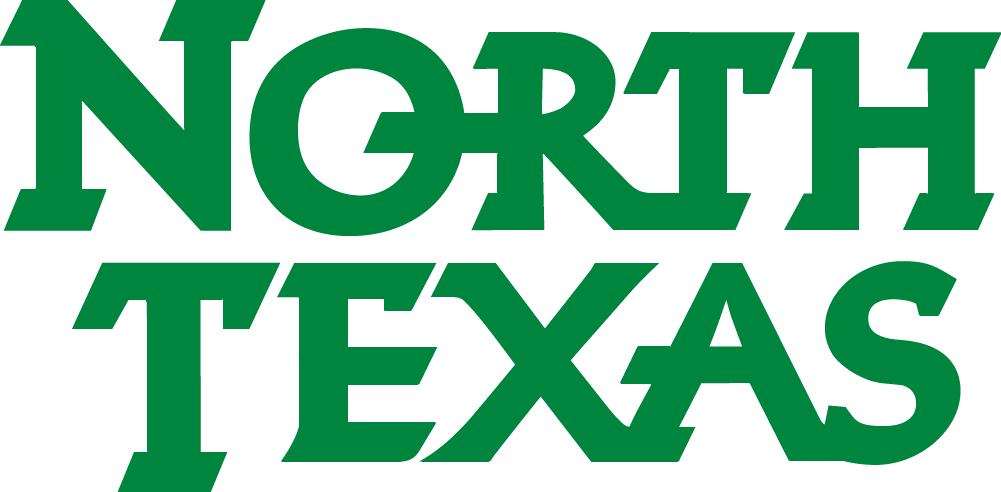
- Conference: Conference USA
- Record: 12–18 (6–10 C-USA)
- Head coach: Mike Petersen (2nd season)
- Assistant coaches: Ashley Davis (2nd season); Wesley Brooks (3rd season); Karen Blair (1st season)
- Home arena: The Super Pit

2013–14 Conference USA women's basketball standings
	Conf.				Overall
Team	W		L	PCT	W		L	PCT
No. 22 Middle Tennessee†	15	–	1	.938	29	–	5	.853
Southern Miss	13	–	3	.813	27	–	7	.794
UTEP	12	–	4	.750	29	–	8	.784
Tulane	11	–	5	.688	20	–	11	.645
East Carolina	10	–	6	.625	22	–	9	.710
Charlotte	9	–	7	.563	15	–	16	.484
Old Dominion	9	–	7	.563	18	–	16	.529
UAB	7	–	9	.438	16	–	15	.516
Florida Atlantic	6	–	10	.375	16	–	14	.533
Tulsa	6	–	10	.375	12	–	16	.429
Rice	6	–	10	.375	13	–	17	.433
FIU	6	–	10	.375	15	–	18	.455
North Texas	6	–	10	.375	12	–	18	.400
Louisiana Tech	5	–	11	.313	12	–	20	.375
UTSA	4	–	12	.250	14	–	17	.452
Marshall	3	–	13	.188	11	–	20	.355
† 2014 C-USA tournament winner As of 10:03, 1 April 2014 (UTC); Rankings from AP poll

The 2013–14 North Texas Mean Green women's basketball team represented the University of North Texas during the 2013–14 NCAA Division I women's basketball season. The Mean Green, led by second year head coach Mike Petersen, played their home games at The Super Pit, also known as UNT Coliseum, and were first year members of Conference USA. They finished the season 12–18 overall, 6–10 in C-USA for a 5 way tie for a ninth place finish. They lost in the first round in the 2014 Conference USA women's basketball tournament to Louisiana Tech.

== Roster ==
Number	Name	Position	Height	Year	Hometown
0	Hannah Christian	Guard	5–7	Senior	Aledo, Texas
1	Ash'Lynne Evans	Forward	5–11	Senior	Everman, Texas
3	Briesha Wynn	Forward	6–0	Junior	Fort Worth, Texas
4	Laura McCoy	Guard	5–7	Senior	Flower Mound, Texas
5	Eboniey Jeter	Forward	6–0	RS Freshman	Killeen, Texas
13	Janis Peterson	Guard	6–1	Junior	San Francisco, California
14	Candice Adams	Guard	5–8	Freshman	Cedar Hill, Texas
20	Terra Ellison	Guard	5–11	Freshman	The Colony, Texas
21	Joh'Vonna Darrington	Forward	6–1	Junior	Oklahoma City, Oklahoma
22	BreAnna Dawkins	Guard	5–6	Junior	Cedar Hill, Texas
23	Acheil Tac	Forward	6–1	Sophomore	Garland, Texas
24	Taylor Hooker	Guard	5–10	Junior	Arlington, Texas
32	Desiree Nelson	Guard	5–10	Senior	Copperas Cove, Texas
33	Alexis Hyder	Forward	5–11	Sophomore	Copperas Cove, Texas
34	Kiara Davis	Guard	5–10	RS Freshman	Fort Worth, Texas

== Schedule ==
Date time, TV	Rank^{#}	Opponent^{#}	Result	Record	Site (attendance) city, state
Regular Season
11/09/2013*; 7:30 pm		UMKC	W 77–70	1–0	The Super Pit (374); Denton, TX
11/11/2013*; 7:00 pm		Texas A&M	L 48–67	1–1	The Super Pit (1,791); Denton, TX
11/20/2013*; 7:00 pm		at Houston	L 61–66	1–2	Hofheinz Pavilion (563); Houston, TX
11/23/2013*; 7:30 pm		Abilene Christian; North Texas Tournament	W 64–50	2–2	The Super Pit (680); Denton, TX
11/24/2013*; 5:00 pm		Bethune-Cookman; North Texas Tournament	W 82–49	3–2	The Super Pit (388); Denton, TX
11/26/2013*; 5:00 pm		Grand Canyon	L 65–67 ^{OT}	3–3	The Super Pit (718); Denton, TX
12/01/2013*; 2:00 pm		at Oklahoma State	L 47–95	3–4	Gallagher-Iba Arena (2,225); Stillwater, OK
12/04/2013*; 7:30 pm		at UT Arlington	W 70–55	4–4	College Park Center (673); Arlington, TX
12/15/2013*; 3:00 pm, Watch Big Sky		at Northern Colorado	L 69–75	4–5	Butler–Hancock Sports Pavilion (317); Greeley, CO
12/17/2013*; 7:00 pm		at Denver	W 93–74	5–5	Magness Arena (1,300); Denver, CO
12/21/2013*; 12:00 pm		SMU	L 79–84	5–6	The Super Pit (854); Denton, TX
12/29/2013*; 2:00 pm		Missouri State	L 79–85	5–7	The Super Pit (454); Denton, TX
01/04/2014*; 5:00 pm		Cameron	W 69–41	6–7	The Super Pit (560); Denton, TX
01/08/2014; 7:00 pm		at Middle Tennessee	L 42–86	6–8 (0–1)	Murphy Center (3,201); Murfreesboro, TN
01/11/2014; 6:00 pm		at Charlotte	L 59–61	6–9 (0–2)	Dale F. Halton Arena (876); Charlotte, NC
01/15/2014; 7:00 pm		Marshall	W 63–50	7–9 (1–2)	The Super Pit (552); Denton, TX
01/18/2014; 2:00 pm		UTSA	L 56–58	7–10 (1–3)	The Super Pit (346); Denton, TX
01/22/2014; 5:00 pm		at FIU	W 66–59	8–10 (2–3)	U.S. Century Bank Arena (395); Miami, FL
01/25/2014; 4:00 pm		at Florida Atlantic	L 69–82	8–11 (2–4)	FAU Arena (528); Boca raton, FL
01/29/2014; 7:00 pm		Tulsa	L 63–79	8–12 (2–5)	The Super Pit (632); Denton, TX
02/01/2014; 2:00 pm		UAB	W 66–58	9–12 (3–5)	The Super Pit (513); Denton, TX
02/05/2014; 7:00 pm		at Tulane	L 55–56	9–13 (3–6)	Devlin Fieldhouse (1,067); New Orleans, LA
02/08/2014; 2:00 pm		Old Dominion	W 68–52	10–13 (4–6)	The Super Pit (578); Denton, TX
02/15/2014; 4:00 pm		at East Carolina	L 49–56	10–14 (4–7)	Williams Arena at Minges Coliseum (1,712); Greenville, NC
02/19/2014; 7:00 pm		UTEP	L 63–74	11–14 (5–7)	The Super Pit (349); Denton, TX
02/22/2014; 2:00 pm		at Tulsa	L 43–63	11–15 (5–8)	Reynolds Center (677); Tulsa, OK
02/26/2014; 7:00 pm		at Rice	W 66–52	12–15 (6–8)	Tudor Fieldhouse (334); Houston, TX
03/01/2014; 2:00 pm		Louisiana Tech	L 54–67	12–16 (6–9)	The Super Pit (876); Denton, TX
03/05/2014; 7:00 pm		Southern Miss	L 77–80	12–17 (6–10)	The Super Pit (798); Denton, TX
2014 C-USA Tournament
03/11/2014; 6:00 pm		vs. Louisiana Tech; First Round	L 59–77	12–18	Memorial Gym (N/A); El Paso, TX
*Non-conference game. ^{#}Rankings from AP Poll. (#) Tournament seedings in parentheses. All times are in Central Time.

== See also ==
- 2013–14 North Texas Mean Green men's basketball team
