= 2013–14 Louisiana–Lafayette Ragin' Cajuns women's basketball team =

Intercollegiate basketball season

2013–14 Louisiana–Lafayette Ragin' Cajuns women's basketball

Sun Belt Tournament, First round (L, Western Kentucky 61-67)
- Conference: Sun Belt Conference
- Record: 14–16 (7–11 Sun Belt)
- Head coach: Garry Brodhead (2nd season)
- Assistant coaches: Deacon Jones; Sallie Guillory; Jennifer Sullivan
- Home arena: Earl K. Long Gymnasium

2013–14 Sun Belt Conference women's basketball standings
	Conf.				Overall
Team	W		L	PCT	W		L	PCT
Arkansas State	14	–	4	.778	22	–	12	.647
Western Kentucky †	13	–	5	.722	24	–	9	.727
Arkansas–Little Rock	12	–	6	.667	18	–	12	.600
Texas State	12	–	6	.667	16	–	16	.500
Troy	8	–	10	.444	12	–	18	.400
Georgia State	8	–	10	.444	12	–	19	.387
Louisiana–Lafayette	7	–	11	.389	14	–	16	.467
Louisiana–Monroe	7	–	11	.389	11	–	20	.355
South Alabama	6	–	12	.333	8	–	20	.286
Texas–Arlington	3	–	15	.167	4	–	25	.138
† 2014 Sun Belt tournament winner

The 2013–14 Louisiana–Lafayette Ragin' Cajuns women's basketball team represented the University of Louisiana at Lafayette during the 2013–14 NCAA Division I women's basketball season. The Ragin' Cajuns were led by second-year head coach Gary Broadhead; they played their double-header home games at the Cajundome with other games at the Earl K. Long Gymnasium, which is located on campus. They were members in the Sun Belt Conference. They finished the season 14–16, 7–11 in Sun Belt play to finish in a two-way tie for seventh place. They were eliminated in the first round of the Sun Belt women's tournament.

== Previous season ==
The Ragin' Cajuns finished the 2013–14 season 10–21, 3–17 in Sun Belt play to finish in a two-way tie for tenth place in the conference. They made it to the 2013 Sun Belt Conference women's basketball tournament, losing in the quarterfinal game by a score of 57–61 to the Western Kentucky Hilltoppers. They were not invited to any other postseason tournament.

== Roster ==
2014–15 Louisiana–Lafayette Ragin' Cajuns women's basketball team
Players
Coaches

Pos.	#	Name	Height	Year	Previous school	Hometown
G	1	Brooklyn Arceneaux	5 ft 9 in (1.75 m)	RS So	St. Thomas More HS	Lafayette, LA
G	3	Robbie Brown	5 ft 8 in (1.73 m)	Jr	St. Thomas More HS	Lafayette, LA
G/F	4	Melody Williams	5 ft 10 in (1.78 m)	Fr	Thesa	Fort Worth, TX
G	5	Braile Fields	5 ft 9 in (1.75 m)	Fr	Leesville HS	Augusta, GA
G	10	Kia Wilridge	5 ft 5 in (1.65 m)	So	St. Thomas More HS	Crowley, LA
G	11	Jaylyn Gordon	5 ft 5 in (1.65 m)	Fr	West St. John HS	Edgard, LA
G/F	14	Adrienne Prejean	5 ft 9 in (1.75 m)	So	Lafayette HS	Lafayette, LA
F	21	Jasmin Mills	6 ft 1 in (1.85 m)	So	Assumption HS	Belle Rose, LA
F	22	Gabby Alexander	5 ft 11 in (1.8 m)	Fr	Bogalusa HS	Bogalusa, LA
G	24	Keke Veal	5 ft 6 in (1.68 m)	So	St. Thomas More HS	Opelousas, LA
G	25	Sylvana Okde	5 ft 6 in (1.68 m)	So	Westbury Christian School	Houston, TX
F	32	Jeremica Edwards	5 ft 10 in (1.78 m)	Fr	Warren Easton HS	New Orleans, LA

Head coach

- Gary Broadhead (Louisiana)

Assistant coach(es)

- Deacon Jones (Louisiana)
- Sallie Guillory (Louisiana)
- Jennifer Sullivan (Memphis)

Legend

- (C) Team captain
- (S) Suspended
- (I) Ineligible
- (W) Walk-on
- Injured
- Current redshirt

Roster
Last update: March 23, 2019

== Schedule and results ==
Date time, TV	Rank^{#}	Opponent^{#}	Result	Record	High points	High rebounds	High assists	Site (attendance) city, state
Exhibition
10/30/2013*; 7:00 pm		Loyola-New Orleans	W 77-65		16 – Okde	9 – Benjamin	6 – Gordon	Earl K. Long Gymnasium (456); Lafayette, LA
11/04/2013*; 5:00 pm		Centenary	W 103-27		21 – Mills	15 – Mills	5 – Veal	Cajundome (402); Lafayette, LA
Non-conference regular season
11/08/2013*; 7:00 pm		Nebraska-Omaha	W 80-68	1–0	20 – Mills	14 – Benjamin	4 – Gordon	Cajundome (879); Lafayette, LA
11/11/2013*; 7:00 pm		Southern-New Orleans	W 72-62	2-0	16 – Mills	11 – Mills	4 – Gordon	Cajundome (361); Lafayette, LA
11/15/2013*; 11:30 am		at Sam Houston State	L 73-86	2-1	17 – Veal	6 – Mills	5 – Veal	Bernard Johnson Coliseum (756); Huntsville, TX
11/20/2013*; 7:00 pm		Lamar	L 60-68	2-2	14 – Veal	9 – Benjamin	4 – Gordon	Cajundome (364); Lafayette, LA
11/25/2013*; 7:00 pm		at Jackson State	W 81-64	3-2	18 – Veal	6 – Tied	4 – Veal	Williams Assembly Center (195); Jackson, MS
12/01/2013*; 2:00 pm		Xavier (LA)	W 62-54	4-2	19 – Okde	11 – Prejean	4 – Gordon	Cajundome (508); Lafayette, LA
12/04/2013*; 7:00 pm		at Mississippi State	L 51-78	4-3	10 – Gordon	9 – Prejean	2 – Veal	Humphrey Coliseum (2,516); Starkville, MS
12/07/2013*; 5:00 pm		at Louisiana Tech	L 44-51	4-4	11 – Gordon	8 – Tied	3 – Brown	Thomas Assembly Center; Ruston, LA
12/14/2013*; 4:00 pm		at New Orleans	W 71-42	5-4	11 – Gordon	8 – Edwards	4 – Gordon	Lakefront Arena (339); New Orleans, LA
12/19/2013*; 7:00 pm		Alcorn State	W 63-50	6-4	13 – Okde	11 – Mills	2 – Okde	Earl K. Long Gymnasium (269); Lafayette, LA
12/29/2013*; 5:00 pm		Southeastern Louisiana	W 66-53	7-4	18 – Veal	9 – Mills	3 – Veal	Cajundome (287); Lafayette, LA
Sun Belt regular season
01/04/2014; 2:00 pm		at Louisiana–Monroe	W 68-49	8-4 (1-0)	23 – Okde	7 – Arceneaux	3 – Veal	Fant-Ewing Coliseum; Monroe, LA
01/08/2014; 7:00 pm		Texas State	L 53-65	8-5 (1-1)	15 – Okde	5 – Arceneaux	3 – Veal	Cajundome (312); Lafayette, LA
01/11/2014; 7:00 pm		Texas–Arlington	W 66-64	9-5 (2-1)	20 – Okde	10 – Brown	5 – Wilridge	Cajundome (269); Lafayette, LA
01/15/2014; 7:05 pm		at South Alabama	W 65-60	10-5 (3-1)	19 – Arceneaux	11 – Wilridge	3 – Gordon	Mitchell Center (521); Mobile, AL
01/18/2014; 5:15 pm		at Troy	L 75-87	10-6 (3-2)	22 – Okde	11 – Arceneaux	6 – Wilridge	Trojan Arena (369); Troy, AL
01/23/2014; 5:00 pm		Georgia State	L 67-72	10-7 (3-3)	16 – Arceneaux	9 – Arceneaux	6 – Brown	Cajundome (469); Lafayette, LA
01/25/2014; 5:00 pm		Western Kentucky	L 63-68	10-8 (3-4)	16 – Okde	6 – Mills	2 – Brown	Cajundome (511); Lafayette, LA
01/29/2014; 7:00 pm		at Arkansas–Little Rock	L 60-74	10-9 (3-5)	19 – Arceneaux	7 – Arceneaux	2 – Wilridge	Jack Stephens Center (2,039); Little Rock, AR
02/01/2014; 5:00 pm		Louisiana-Monroe	L 59-66	10-10 (3-6)	15 – Wilridge	8 – Arceneaux	1 – Arceneaux	Cajundome (715); Lafayette, LA
02/06/2014; 12:00 pm		at UT Arlington	L 54-73	10-11 (3-7)	13 – Gordon	6 – Arceneaux	4 – Gordon	College Park Center (1,896); Arlington, TX
02/08/2014; 2:00 pm		at Texas State	L 64-70	10-12 (3-8)	15 – Gordon	8 – Arceneaux	1 – Gordon	Strahan Coliseum; San Marcos, TX
02/12/2014; 7:00 pm		Arkansas–Little Rock	L 57-63	10-13 (3–9)	17 – Okde	6 – Wilridge	4 – Wilridge	Cajundome (269); Lafayette, LA
02/15/2014; 5:00 pm		Arkansas State; Think Pink Game	W 77-76	11-13 (4-9)	22 – Alexander	5 – Brown	2 – Alexander	Cajundome (369); Lafayette, LA
02/19/2014; 7:00 pm		Troy	W 62-57	12-13 (5-9)	17 – Arceneaux	8 – Gordon	7 – Wilridge	Cajundome (284); Lafayette, LA
02/22/2014; 5:00 pm		at Georgia State	W 67-63	13-13 (6-9)	19 – Arceneaux	5 – Arceneaux	3 – Arceneaux	GSU Sports Arena; Atlanta, GA
03/02/2014; 5:15 pm, ESPN3		South Alabama	W 68-61 ^{OT}	14-13 (7-9)	17 – Wilridge	9 – Alexander	5 – Wilridge	Cajundome (396); Lafayette, LA
03/05/2014; 7:00 pm		at Western Kentucky	L 71-80	14-14 (7-10)	21 – Wilridge	5 – Arceneaux	3 – Gordon	E. A. Diddle Arena (1,322); Bowling Green, KY
03/08/2014; 3:05 pm		at Arkansas State	L 49-90	14-15 (7-11)	25 – Gordon	9 – Arceneaux	4 – Wilridge	First National Bank Arena (1,533); Jonesboro, AR
Sun Belt Women's Tournament (0–1)
03/12/2014; 6:00 pm	(7)	vs. (2) Western Kentucky; First Round	L 61-67	14-16	21 – Okde	5 – Arceneaux	5 – Gordon	Lakefront Arena; New Orleans, LA
*Non-conference game. ^{#}Rankings from AP Poll. (#) Tournament seedings in parentheses. All times are in Central Time.

== See also ==
- 2013–14 Louisiana–Lafayette Ragin' Cajuns men's basketball team
