= 2013–14 Middle Tennessee Blue Raiders women's basketball team =

Intercollegiate basketball season

2013–14 Middle Tennessee Blue Raiders women's basketball

Gulf Coast Showcase Champions Conference USA Regular Season & Tournament Champions

NCAA Women's Basketball, first round
- Conference: Conference USA
- Record: 29–4 (15–1 C-USA)
- Head coach: Rick Insell (9th season)
- Assistant coaches: Kim Brewton; Alysha Clark; Mariska Harris
- Home arena: Murphy Center

2013–14 Conference USA women's basketball standings
	Conf.				Overall
Team	W		L	PCT	W		L	PCT
No. 22 Middle Tennessee†	15	–	1	.938	29	–	5	.853
Southern Miss	13	–	3	.813	27	–	7	.794
UTEP	12	–	4	.750	29	–	8	.784
Tulane	11	–	5	.688	20	–	11	.645
East Carolina	10	–	6	.625	22	–	9	.710
Charlotte	9	–	7	.563	15	–	16	.484
Old Dominion	9	–	7	.563	18	–	16	.529
UAB	7	–	9	.438	16	–	15	.516
Florida Atlantic	6	–	10	.375	16	–	14	.533
Tulsa	6	–	10	.375	12	–	16	.429
Rice	6	–	10	.375	13	–	17	.433
FIU	6	–	10	.375	15	–	18	.455
North Texas	6	–	10	.375	12	–	18	.400
Louisiana Tech	5	–	11	.313	12	–	20	.375
UTSA	4	–	12	.250	14	–	17	.452
Marshall	3	–	13	.188	11	–	20	.355
† 2014 C-USA tournament winner As of 10:03, 1 April 2014 (UTC); Rankings from AP poll

The 2013–14 Middle Tennessee Blue Raiders women's basketball team represented Middle Tennessee State University during the 2013–14 NCAA Division I women's basketball season. The Blue Raiders, led by 8th-year head coach Rick Insell, play their home games at the Murphy Center and are first year members of Conference USA. They were regular season champions of Conference USA and also won the Conference USA tournament to earn an automatic trip to the 2014 NCAA Division I women's basketball tournament, where they lost in the first round to Oregon State.

== Roster ==
Number	Name	Position	Height	Year	Hometown
2	Janay Brinkley	Guard	5–8	Senior	Pasadena, Maryland
3	Ty Petty	Guard	5–7	Freshman	Murfreesboro, Tennessee
5	Shanice Cason	Guard	5–6	Junior	Murfreesboro, Tennessee
10	MacKenzie Sells	Guard	5–10	Sophomore	Livingston, Tennessee
11	Cheyenne Parker	Forward	6–4	Senior	Queens, New York
21	Ebony Rowe	Forward	6–1	Senior	Lexington, Kentucky
23	Lauren March	Forward	6–2	RS senior	Lewisburg, Tennessee
24	China Dow	Guard	5-8	Freshman	Louisville, Kentucky
30	Caya Williams	Forward	6-1	Freshman	Mount Juliet, Tennessee
31	TiAnna Porter	Forward	6–2	RS sophomore	Paris, Tennessee
32	Caroline Warden	Guard	5–7	Sophomore	Gainesboro, Tennessee
34	Olivia Jones	Forward	5–10	Freshman	Murfreesboro, Tennessee
42	KeKe Stewart	Center	6–1	Senior	Oak Ridge, Tennessee
44	Shy Copney	Guard	5–9	Freshman	Johnson City, Tennessee
50	Janiece Johnson	Center	6–7	Senior	Washington, D.C.
52	Laken Leonard	Guard	5–10	Senior	Whitleyville, Tennessee

== Schedule ==
Date time, TV	Rank^{#}	Opponent^{#}	Result	Record	Site (attendance) city, state
Exhibition
10/29/2013*; 6:30 pm		UAH	W 77–60	-	Murphy Center (1,758); Murfreesboro, TN
11/01/2013*; 6:30 pm		Freed-Hardeman at Middle Tennessee	W 85–53	-	Murphy Center (1,475); Murfreesboro, TN
Regular season
11/08/2013*; 7:00 pm, WUXP		No. 4 Tennessee	L 57–67	0–1	Murphy Center (11,227); Murfreesboro, TN
11/15/2013*; 7:00 pm		Miami	W 61–55	1–1	BankUnited Center (850); Coral Gabes, FL
11/19/2013*; 7:00 pm		at Arkansas	L 51–66	1–2	Bud Walton Arena (1,086); Fayetteville, AR
11/24/2013*; 7:00 pm, WUXP		No. 7 Kentucky	L 72–84	1–3	Murphy Center (4,822); Murfreesboro, TN
11/29/2013*; 11:30 am		vs. Southeastern Louisiana; Gulf Coast Showcase quarterfinals	W 88–74	2–3	Germain Arena (N/A); Estero, FL
11/30/2013*; 6:00 pm		vs. Wright State; Gulf Coast Showcase semifinals	W 69–62	3–3	Germain Arena (136); Estero, FL
12/01/2013*; 5:00 pm		vs. Mississippi State; Gulf Coast Showcase championship	W 62–48	4–3	Germain Arena (317); Estero, FL
12/04/2013*; 11:00 am, Peay Nation TV		at Austin Peay	W 69–43	5–3	Dunn Center (1,421); Clarksville, TN
12/12/2013*; 11:00 am		Kennesaw State	W 68–32	6–3	Murphy Center (10,028); Murfreesboro, KY
12/16/2013*; 6:00 pm		at UCF	W 63–51	7–3	CFE Arena (348); Orlando, FL
12/18/2013*; 6:00 pm		at South Florida	W 68–62	8–3	USF Sun Dome (1,161); Tampa, FL
12/21/2013*; 1:00 pm, WUXP		South Dakota State	W 59–44	9–3	Murphy Center (3,035); Murfreesboro, TN
12/29/2013*; 1:00 pm		at Clemson	W 76–51	10–3	Littlejohn Coliseum (614); Clemson, SC
01/02/2014*; 7:00 pm		Tennessee Tech	W 84–53	11–3	Murphy Center (2,912); Murfreesboro, TN
01/08/2014; 7:00 pm		North Texas	W 86–42	12–3 (1–0)	Murphy Center (3,201); Murfreesboro, TN
01/11/2014; 5:00 pm		at Louisiana Tech	W 68–51	13–3 (2–0)	Thomas Assembly Center (4,236); Ruston, LA
01/15/2014; 7:00 pm		UTEP	W 69–58	14–3 (3–0)	Murphy Center (3,724); Murfreesboro, TN
01/18/2014; 4:00 pm		at UAB	W 61–55	15–3 (4–0)	Bartow Arena (761); Birmingham, AL
01/22/2014; 7:00 pm		UTSA	W 60–41	16–3 (5–0)	Murphy Center (3,205); Murfreesboro, TN
01/25/2014; 4:00 pm, WNAB		Old Dominion	W 62–49	17–3 (6–0)	Murphy Center (3,806); Murfreesboro, TN
02/01/2014; 12:30 pm	No. 25	at Tulsa	W 67–57	18–3 (7–0)	Reynolds Center (1,177); Tulsa, OK
02/05/2014; 7:00 pm	No. 21	at Southern Miss	L 56–68	18–4 (7–1)	Reed Green Coliseum (1,258); Hattiesburg, MS
02/08/2014; 2:00 pm	No. 21	Rice	W 65–54	19–4 (8–1)	Murphy Center (4,209); Murfreesboro, TN
02/12/2014; 5:00 pm		at Florida International	W 65–58	20–4 (9–1)	U.S. Century Bank Arena (366); Miami, FL
02/15/2014; 11:00 am, SPSO		at Florida Atlantic	W 83–77	21–4 (10–1)	FAU Arena (569); Boca Raton, FL
02/19/2014; 7:00 pm		Marshall	W 75–36	22–4 (11–1)	Murphy Center (3,032); Murfreesboro, TN
02/22/2014; 3:00 pm, SPSO		Charlotte	W 48–46	23–4 (12–1)	Murphy Center (3,227); Murfreesboro, TN
02/26/2014; 6:00 pm	No. 23	at East Carolina	W 70–59	24–4 (13–1)	Williams Arena at Minges Coliseum (902); Greenville, NC
03/01/2014; 7:00 pm	No. 22	UAB	W 64–52	25–4 (14–1)	Murphy Center (6,307); Murfreesboro, TN
03/05/2014; 7:00 pm	No. 22	at Tulane	W 71–44	26–4 (15–1)	Devlin Fieldhouse (848); New Orleans, LA
Conference USA Tournament
03/13/2014; 12:00 pm	No. 22	vs. UAB; Quarterfinals	W 69–59	27–4	Memorial Gym (2,401); El Paso, TX
03/14/2014; 10:00 am, CBSSN	No. 22	vs. FIU; Semifinals	W 64–57	28–4	Don Haskins Center (3,244); El Paso, TX
03/15/2014; 7:00 pm, CBSSN	No. 22	vs. Southern Miss; Championship	W 84–55	29–4	Don Haskins Center (4,883); El Paso, TX
NCAA tournament
03/23/2014*; 7:00 pm, ESPN2	No. 22	vs. Oregon State; First Round	L 36–55	29–5	Alaska Airlines Arena (2,214); Seattle, WA
*Non-conference game. ^{#}Rankings from AP Poll. (#) Tournament seedings in parentheses. All times are in Central Time.
