= 2013–14 Texas–Arlington Mavericks women's basketball team =

Intercollegiate basketball season

2013–14 Texas–Arlington Mavericks women's basketball
- Conference: Sun Belt Conference
- Record: 4–25 (3–15 Sun Belt)
- Head coach: Krista Gerlich (1st season)
- Assistant coaches: Kristin Cole; Ashley Crawford; Talby Justus
- Home arena: College Park Center

2013–14 Sun Belt Conference women's basketball standings
| | Conf. | | | | Overall |
| Team | W | | L | PCT | W | | L | PCT |
|---|---|---|---|---|---|---|---|---|
| Arkansas State | 14 | – | 4 | .778 | 22 | – | 12 | .647 |
| Western Kentucky † | 13 | – | 5 | .722 | 24 | – | 9 | .727 |
| Arkansas–Little Rock | 12 | – | 6 | .667 | 18 | – | 12 | .600 |
| Texas State | 12 | – | 6 | .667 | 16 | – | 16 | .500 |
| Troy | 8 | – | 10 | .444 | 12 | – | 18 | .400 |
| Georgia State | 8 | – | 10 | .444 | 12 | – | 19 | .387 |
| Louisiana–Lafayette | 7 | – | 11 | .389 | 14 | – | 16 | .467 |
| Louisiana–Monroe | 7 | – | 11 | .389 | 11 | – | 20 | .355 |
| South Alabama | 6 | – | 12 | .333 | 8 | – | 20 | .286 |
| Texas–Arlington | 3 | – | 15 | .167 | 4 | – | 25 | .138 |
† 2014 Sun Belt tournament winner

The 2013–14 Texas–Arlington Mavericks women's basketball team represented the University of Texas at Arlington during the 2013–14 NCAA Division I women's basketball season. The Mavericks, led by first year head coach Krista Gerlich, play their home games at the College Park Center as first year members of the Sun Belt Conference.

== Roster ==
| Number | Name | Position | Height | Year | Hometown |
|---|---|---|---|---|---|
| 3 | Malaika Green | Guard | 5–4 | Senior | Coppell, Texas |
| 4 | Jordan Holub | Guard | 5–5 | Sophomore | San Antonio, Texas |
| 10 | Krioni Bruce | Guard | 5–9 | Junior | Mesquite, Texas |
| 11 | Thalia Pope | Guard | 5–11 | Junior | Wichita, Kansas |
| 12 | Chauntandra Williams | Guard | 5–8 | Junior | Lufkin, Texas |
| 15 | Taylor Caspers | Center | 6–1 | Sophomore | Fairfield, California |
| 21 | Briana Walkers | Forward | 6–1 | Senior | Fort Worth, Texas |
| 22 | Laila Suleiman | Guard | 5–3 | Senior | Yukon, Oklahoma |
| 23 | Morgan Hunt | Forward | 6–2 | RS Junior | Colleyville, Texas |
| 24 | Amara Wainwright | Guard | 5–7 | Junior | Sacramento, California |
| 25 | Allyson Te'o | Forward | 6–2 | Freshman | Fort Worth, Texas |
| 30 | Takiyah Langford | Forward | 5–11 | Sophomore | Arlington, Texas |
| 32 | Allea Harris | Guard | 5–7 | Freshman | Argyle, Texas |
| 44 | Desherra Nwanguma | Center | 6–3 | Senior | Katy, Texas |

== Schedule ==
| Date time, TV | Rank^{#} | Opponent^{#} | Result | Record | Site (attendance) city, state |
Regular Season
| 11/08/2013*; 7:00 pm, LSN | | at Houston Baptist | L 60–72 | 0–1 | Sharp Gymnasium (628); Houston, TX |
| 11/10/2013*; 1:00 pm | | at Oklahoma State | L 35–74 | 0–2 | Gallagher-Iba Arena (2,280); Stillwater, OK |
| 11/14/2013*; 7:30 pm | | Incarnate Word | L 48–52 | 0–3 | College Park Center (663); Arlington, TX |
| 11/17/2013*; 5:00 pm | | at UTSA | L 56–74 | 0–4 | Convocation Center (507); San Antonio, TX |
| 11/20/2013*; 7:00 pm, FCS Atlantic | | at No. 11 Oklahoma | L 46–99 | 0–5 | Lloyd Noble Center (4,581); Arlington, TX |
| 11/24/2013*; 1:00 pm | | VCU | L 63–74 ^{OT} | 0–6 | College Park Center (622); Arlington, TX |
| 11/27/2013*; 7:30 pm | | Abilene Christian | L 72–79 | 0–7 | College Park Center (781); Arlington, TX |
| 12/04/2013*; 7:30 pm | | North Texas | L 55–70 | 0–8 | College Park Center (673); Arlington, TX |
| 12/14/2013*; 11:30 am | | at Northern Arizona | L 65–85 | 0–9 | Walkup Skydome (464); Flagstaff, AZ |
| 12/18/2013*; 7:00 pm | | at Texas-Pan American | L 63–75 | 0–10 | UTPA Fieldhouse (723); Edinburg, TX |
| 12/21/2013*; 3:30 pm | | Texas A&M–Corpus Christi | W 75–64 | 1–10 | College Park Center (1,137); Arlington, TX |
| 01/02/2014; 5:00 pm | | Arkansas State | L 62–66 | 1–11 (0–1) | College Park Center (N/A); Arlington, TX |
| 01/04/2014; 7:30 pm | | Arkansas–Little Rock | L 57–64 | 1–12 (0–2) | College Park Center (1,875); Arlington, TX |
| 01/08/2014; 7:30 pm | | Louisiana–Monroe | L 67–84 | 1–13 (0–3) | College Park Center (636); Arlington, TX |
| 01/11/2014; 4:15 pm | | at Louisiana–Lafayette | L 64–66 | 1–14 (0–4) | Cajundome (269); Lafayette, LA |
| 01/15/2014; 7:00 pm | | at Texas State | L 60–68 | 1–15 (0–5) | Strahan Coliseum (1,142); San Marcos, TX |
| 01/22/2014; 7:30 pm | | Troy | L 62–85 | 1–16 (0–6) | College Park Center (471); Arlington, TX |
| 01/25/2014; 5:00 pm | | South Alabama | L 72–73 ^{OT} | 1–17 (0–7) | College Park Center (N/A); Arlington, TX |
| 01/29/2014; 7:00 pm | | at WKU | L 46–59 | 1–18 (0–8) | E. A. Diddle Arena (808); Bowling Green, KY |
| 02/01/2014; 11:00 am | | at Georgia State | W 67–51 | 2–18 (1–8) | GSU Sports Arena (1,896); Atlanta, GA |
| 02/06/2014; 12:00 pm | | Louisiana–Lafayette | W 73–54 | 3–18 (2–8) | College Park Center (1,896); Arlington, TX |
| 02/12/2014; 7:00 pm | | at Louisiana–Monroe | L 65–70 | 3–19 (2–9) | Fant–Ewing Coliseum (954); Monroe, LA |
| 02/15/2014; 5:00 pm | | Texas State | L 48–54 | 3–20 (2–10) | College Park Center (N/A); Arlington, TX |
| 02/19/2014; 7:05 pm | | at Arkansas State | L 47–73 | 3–21 (2–11) | Convocation Center (1,017); Jonesboro, AR |
| 02/22/2014; 4:30 pm | | at Arkansas–Little Rock | L 60–69 | 3–22 (2–12) | Jack Stephens Center (N/A); Little Rock, AR |
| 02/26/2014; 7:30 pm | | Georgia State | W 85–72 | 4–22 (3–12) | College Park Center (380); Arlington, TX |
| 03/01/2014; 5:00 pm | | WKU | L 70–94 | 4–23 (3–13) | College Park Center (1,835); Arlington, TX |
| 03/05/2014; 7:00 pm | | at Troy | L 72–88 | 4–24 (3–14) | Trojan Arena (453); Troy, AL |
| 03/08/2014; 5:00 pm | | at South Alabama | L 57–60 ^{OT} | 4–25 (3–15) | Mitchell Center (N/A); Mobile, AL |
*Non-conference game. ^{#}Rankings from AP Poll. (#) Tournament seedings in parentheses. All times are in Central Time.

== See also ==
2013–14 Texas–Arlington Mavericks men's basketball team
