= 2013–14 Texas State Bobcats women's basketball team =

Intercollegiate basketball season

2013–14 Texas State Bobcats women's basketball

2014 Women's Basketball Invitational, first round
- Conference: Sun Belt Conference
- Record: 16–16 (12–6 Sun Belt)
- Head coach: Zenarae Antoine (3rd season)
- Assistant coaches: Sue Serafini; Chandra Dorsey; Katie Paganelli
- Home arena: Strahan Coliseum

2013–14 Sun Belt Conference women's basketball standings
	Conf.				Overall
Team	W		L	PCT	W		L	PCT
Arkansas State	14	–	4	.778	22	–	12	.647
Western Kentucky †	13	–	5	.722	24	–	9	.727
Arkansas–Little Rock	12	–	6	.667	18	–	12	.600
Texas State	12	–	6	.667	16	–	16	.500
Troy	8	–	10	.444	12	–	18	.400
Georgia State	8	–	10	.444	12	–	19	.387
Louisiana–Lafayette	7	–	11	.389	14	–	16	.467
Louisiana–Monroe	7	–	11	.389	11	–	20	.355
South Alabama	6	–	12	.333	8	–	20	.286
Texas–Arlington	3	–	15	.167	4	–	25	.138
† 2014 Sun Belt tournament winner

The 2013–14 Texas State Bobcats women's basketball team represented Texas State University–San Marcos during the 2013–14 NCAA Division I women's basketball season. The Bobcats, led by third year head coach Zenrae Antoine, played their home games at Strahan Coliseum and were first year members of the Sun Belt Conference.

== Roster ==
Number	Name	Position	Height	Year	Hometown
0	Kaylan Martin	Guard	5–6	Senior	Pflugerville, Texas
1	Ayriel Anderson	Guard	5–3	Sophomore	Irving, Texas
10	Meghan Braeuer	Guard	5–7	Junior	Belton, Texas
12	Rochelle Vasquez	Guard	5–9	Freshman	McKinney, Texas
21	Kileah Mays	Center	6–2	RS Sophomore	Dallas, Texas
24	Raven Burns	Guard	5–7	Sophomore	Houston, Texas
25	Jasmine Baugus	Forward	5–10	Senior	Killeen, Texas
31	Correy Moyer	Forward	6–0	Freshman	Verdigris, Oklahoma
32	Kaitlin Walla	Guard	5–9	Freshman	Georgetown, Texas
34	Carrie Kirchner	Center	6–4	Freshman	Leander, Texas
35	Erin Peoples	Guard	6–0	Sophomore	Little Rock, Arkansas
42	Jacqueline Jeffcoat	Forward	6–2	RS Junior	Dallas, Texas
45	Ashley Ezeh	Center	6–1	Senior	Houston, Texas

== Schedule ==
Date time, TV	Rank^{#}	Opponent^{#}	Result	Record	Site (attendance) city, state
Regular Season
11/08/2013*; 7:00 pm		Huston–Tillotson	W 73–45	1–0	Strahan Coliseum (1,198); San Marcos, TX
11/13/2013*; 7:00 pm, LONG		at Texas	L 42–96	1–1	Frank Erwin Center (2,627); Austin, TX
11/16/2013*; 7:00 pm		at TCU	L 50–63	1–2	Daniel-Meyer Coliseum (2,001); Ft. Worth, TX
11/23/2013*; 1:00 pm		Hampton	L 63–72	1–3	Strahan Coliseum (909); San Marcos, TX
11/27/2013*; 7:00 pm		Texas A&M–Corpus Christi	L 60–68	1–4	Strahan Coliseum (929); San Marcos, TX
11/30/2013*; 7:05 pm		at UTEP	L 60–73	1–5	Don Haskins Center (1,353); El Paso, TX
12/05/2013*; 7:05 pm		at Rice	L 61–74	1–6	Tudor Fieldhouse (333); Houston, TX
12/15/2013*; 2:00 pm		Houston	W 70–63	2–6	Strahan Coliseum (935); San Marcos, TX
12/18/2013*; 6:00 pm		at Lamar	L 55–68	2–7	Montagne Center (738); Beaumont, TX
12/22/2013*; 1:00 pm		UTSA	L 83–86	2–8	Strahan Coliseum (987); San Marcos, TX
12/29/2013*; 2:00 pm		St. Thomas	W 85–45	3–8	Strahan Coliseum (858); San Marcos, TX
01/02/2014; 5:00 pm		Arkansas–Little Rock	W 42–35	4–8 (1–0)	Strahan Coliseum (N/A); San Marcos, TX
01/04/2014; 2:00 pm		Arkansas State	L 71–87	4–9 (1–1)	Strahan Coliseum (N/A); San Marcos, TX
01/08/2014; 7:00 pm		at Louisiana–Lafayette	W 65–53	5–9 (2–1)	Cajundome (312); Lafayette, LA
01/11/2014; 2:00 pm		at Louisiana–Monroe	L 52–78	5–10 (2–2)	Fant–Ewing Coliseum (1,106); Monroe, LA
01/15/2014; 7:00 pm		UT Arlington	W 68–60	6–10 (3–2)	Strahan Coliseum (1,142); San Marcos, TX
01/22/2014; 7:00 pm		at Arkansas–Little Rock	L 70–77	6–11 (3–3)	Jack Stephens Center (1,139); Little Rock, AR
01/25/2014; 2:00 pm		Troy	L 82–87 ^{OT}	7–11 (4–3)	Strahan Coliseum (N/A); San Marcos, TX
02/01/2014; 4:30 pm, ESPN3		at WKU	W 72–63	8–11 (5–3)	E. A. Diddle Arena (2,849); Bowling Green, KY
02/05/2014; 7:00 pm		Louisiana–Monroe	W 75–70	9–11 (6–3)	Strahan Coliseum (1,255); San Marcos, TX
02/08/2014; 2:00 pm		Louisiana–Lafayette	W 70–64	10–11 (7–3)	Strahan Coliseum (N/A); San Marcos, TX
02/15/2014; 5:00 pm		at UT Arlington	W 54–49	11–11 (8–3)	College Park Center (N/A); Arlington, TX
02/17/2014; 7:00 pm		at Georgia State	L 69–82	11–12 (8–4)	GSU Sports Arena (1,759); Atlanta, GA
02/19/2014; 7:00 pm		South Alabama	W 63–61	12–12 (9–4)	Strahan Coliseum (1,374); San Marcos, TX
02/22/2014; 3:05 pm		at Arkansas State	L 55–74	12–13 (9–5)	Convocation Center (1,357); Jonesboro, AR
02/26/2014; 7:00 pm		WKU	L 45–75	12–14 (9–6)	Strahan Coliseum (1,360); San Marcos, TX
03/01/2014; 2:00 pm, KNVA		Georgia State	W 54–47	13–14 (10–6)	Strahan Coliseum (2,002); San Marcos, TX
03/05/2014; 7:05 pm		at South Alabama	W 64–60	14–14 (11–6)	Mitchell Center (297); Mobile, AL
03/08/2014; 5:15 pm		at Troy	W 95–92	15–14 (12–6)	Trojan Arena (877); Troy, AL
2014 Sun Belt Tournament
03/12/2014; 2:30 pm	(4)	vs. (5) Georgia State; Quarterfinals	W 78–44	16–14	Lakefront Arena (N/A); New Orleans, LA
03/14/2014; 12:00 pm	(4)	vs. (1) Arkansas State; Semifinals	L 48–59	16–15	Lakefront Arena (N/A); New Orleans, LA
2014 Women's Basketball Invitational
03/20/2014; 7:00 pm	(5W)	at (4W) Stephen F. Austin; First Round	L 51–59	16–16	William R. Johnson Coliseum (559); Nacogdoches, TX
*Non-conference game. ^{#}Rankings from AP Poll. (#) Tournament seedings in parentheses. All times are in Central Time.

== See also ==
2013–14 Texas State Bobcats men's basketball team
