= 2013–14 Georgia State Panthers women's basketball team =

Intercollegiate basketball season

2013–14 Georgia State Panthers women's basketball
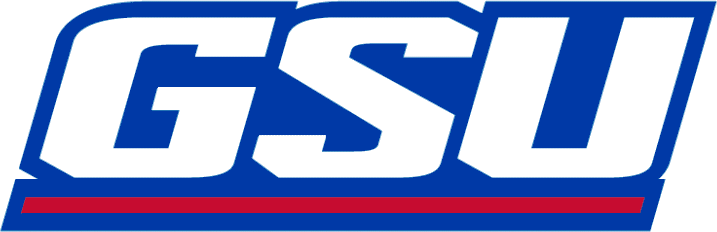
- Conference: Sun Belt Conference
- Record: 12–16 (8–8 Sun Belt)
- Head coach: Sharon Baldwin-Tener (4th season)
- Assistant coaches: Johnathon Barbaree (3rd season); Adrienne Shuler (4th season); Jocelyn Wyatt (4th season)
- Home arena: GSU Sports Arena (Capacity: 4,500)

2013–14 Sun Belt Conference women's basketball standings
	Conf.				Overall
Team	W		L	PCT	W		L	PCT
Arkansas State	14	–	4	.778	22	–	12	.647
Western Kentucky †	13	–	5	.722	24	–	9	.727
Arkansas–Little Rock	12	–	6	.667	18	–	12	.600
Texas State	12	–	6	.667	16	–	16	.500
Troy	8	–	10	.444	12	–	18	.400
Georgia State	8	–	10	.444	12	–	19	.387
Louisiana–Lafayette	7	–	11	.389	14	–	16	.467
Louisiana–Monroe	7	–	11	.389	11	–	20	.355
South Alabama	6	–	12	.333	8	–	20	.286
Texas–Arlington	3	–	15	.167	4	–	25	.138
† 2014 Sun Belt tournament winner

The 2013–14 Georgia State Panthers women's basketball team represented Georgia State University in the 2013–14 NCAA Division I women's basketball season. The Panthers, coached by Sharon Baldwin-Tener, were a member of the Sun Belt Conference, and played their home games on campus at the GSU Sports Arena.

== Season notes ==
- The 2013–14 season represented the first year of play in the Sun Belt Conference.

== 2013–14 roster ==
2013–14 Georgia State Panthers women's basketball team
Players
Coaches

Pos.	#	Name	Height	Year	Previous school	Hometown
G/F	2	Miranda Smith	5 ft 9 in (1.75 m)	Jr	Patrick Henry	Roanoke, Virginia
F/C	4	Maryam Dogo	6 ft 2 in (1.88 m)	RS Jr	Lamar Community College	Kaduna, Nigeria
G	5	Alisha Andrews	4 ft 11 in (1.5 m)	RS Jr	Redan High School	Stone Mountain, Ga.
G	10	Kendra Long	5 ft 9 in (1.75 m)	Sr	Benjamin Elijah Mays High School	Atlanta, Ga
F/C	11	Ashanti Groover	6 ft 2 in (1.88 m)	Fr	Bartow High School	Bartow, Florida
G	12	Ashlee Cole	5 ft 8 in (1.73 m)	So	Forest Park High School	Ellenwood, Ga.
C	13	Brittany Logan	6 ft 4 in (1.93 m)	Jr	Georgia Perimeter College	Decatur, Ga.
G	20	Kayla Nolan	5 ft 8 in (1.73 m)	Jr	Duluth High School	Duluth, Ga.
F	21	Morgan Jackson	6 ft 0 in (1.83 m)	So	East Hall High School	Gainesville, Ga.
F/C	22	Jamila Mayfield	6 ft 4 in (1.93 m)	Fr	Howard	Macon, Ga.
G	23	Ashley Watson	5 ft 6 in (1.68 m)	Jr	Archbishop Mitty High School	San Jose, California
G	24	Gaby Moss	5 ft 8 in (1.73 m)	So	T. C. Williams High School	Alexandria, Virginia
F/C	32	Haley Gerrin	6 ft 2 in (1.88 m)	Fr	Habersham Central High School	Clarksville, Ga.

Head coach

Sharon Baldwin-Tener

Assistant coach(es)

Johnathon Barbaree
Adrienne Shuler
Jocelyn Wyatt

Legend

- (C) Team captain
- (S) Suspended
- (I) Ineligible
- (W) Walk-on
- Injured
- Current redshirt

Roster
Last update: 2014-10-06

== 2013–14 schedule ==
Date time, TV	Rank^{#}	Opponent^{#}	Result	Record	Site (attendance) city, state
Regular Season
November 8*; 8:00 pm		at Tennessee–Martin; Preseason WNIT	L 80–84	0–1	Skyhawk Arena (2,173); Martin, Tennessee
November 1*; 6:00 pm		vs. North Carolina A&T; Preseason WNIT	L 49–74	0–2	William R. Johnson Coliseum (N/A); Nacogdoches, Texas
November 14*; 5:00 pm		at Stephen F. Austin; Preseason WNIT	L 60–66	0–3	William R. Johnson Coliseum (N/A); Nacogdoches, Texas
November 19*; 6:00 pm		UCF	L 77–85	0–4	GSU Sports Arena (734); Atlanta
November 23*; 7:30 pm		at Western Carolina	L 61–74	0–5	Ramsey Center (557); Cullowhee, North Carolina
November 27*; 12:00 pm		Belmont	W 87–84	1–5	GSU Sports Arena (494); Atlanta
November 29*; 2:00 pm		Jacksonville State; Georgia State Invitational	W 65–63	2–5	GSU Sports Arena (614); Atlanta
December 1*; 2:30 pm		No. 22 Georgia; Georgia State Invitational	L 58–70	2–6	GSU Sports Arena (608); Atlanta
December 3*; 7:00 pm		at Kennesaw State	W 60–54	3–6	KSU Convocation Center (614); Kennesaw, Georgia
December 8*; 12:00 pm		at Kent State	W 56–55	4–6	Memorial Athletic and Convocation Center (373); Kent, Ohio
December 18*; 8:30 pm		at San Jose State	L 81–95	4–7	Event Center Arena (131); San Jose, California
December 20*; 10:00 pm		at Santa Clara	L 68–87	4–8	Stephen Schott Stadium (394); Santa Clara, California
January 2; 4:30 pm		Troy	W 85–77	5–8 (1–0)	GSU Sports Arena (689); Atlanta
January 4; 3:00 pm		at South Alabama	L 57–65	5–9 (1–1)	Mitchell Center (2,244); Mobile, Alabama
January 8; 12:30 pm		at WKU	L 59–80	5–10 (2–1)	E. A. Diddle Arena (2,692); Bowling Green, Kentucky
January 14; 8:00 pm		at Arkansas State	W 76–74	6–10 (2–2)	Convocation Center (Arkansas State University) (855); Jonesboro, Arkansas
January 18; 12:00 pm		Arkansas–Little Rock	W 61–59	7–10 (3–2)	GSU Sports Arena (537); Atlanta
January 23; 6:00 pm		at Louisiana–Lafayette	W 72–67	8–10 (4–2)	Earl K. Long Gymnasium (469); Lafayette, Louisiana
January 25; 3:00 pm		at Louisiana–Monroe	W 77–66	9–10 (5–2)	Fant–Ewing Coliseum (NR); Monroe, Louisiana
January 30; 4:30 pm		South Alabama	W 63–55	10–10 (6–2)	GSU Sports Arena (575); Atlanta
February 1; 6:00 pm, Sun Belt Network		Texas–Arlington	L 51–67	10–11 (6–3)	GSU Sports Arena (NR); Atlanta
February 8; 12:00 pm		Arkansas State	L 75–80	10–12 (6–4)	GSU Sports Arena (613); Atlanta
February 15; 8:30 pm		at Troy	L 90–111	10–13 (6–5)	Trojan Arena (1124); Troy, Alabama
February 17; 5:00 pm		Texas State	W 82–69	11–13 (7–5)	GSU Sports Arena (1759); Atlanta
February 19; 7:00 pm		Louisiana–Monroe	W 85–77	12–13 (8–5)	GSU Sports Arena (427); Atlanta
February 22; 12:00 pm, Sun Belt Network		Louisiana–Lafayette	L 63–67	12–14 (8–6)	GSU Sports Arena (2890); Atlanta
February 26; 8:30 pm		at Texas–Arlington	L 72–85	12–15 (8–7)	College Park Center (380); Arlington, Texas
March 1; 3:00 pm		at Texas State	L 47–54	12–16 (8–8)	Strahan Coliseum (NR); San Marcos, Texas
March 8; 12:00 pm		WKU	L 63–79	12–17 (8–9)	GSU Sports Arena (3870); Atlanta, Georgia
2014 Sun Belt Tournament
March 12; 2:30 pm		vs. Texas State; Sun Belt Conference tournament	L 44–78	12–18	Lakefront Arena (499); New Orleans
*Non-conference game. ^{#}Rankings from AP Poll. (#) Tournament seedings in parentheses. All times are in Eastern Time.
