= 2014 Sun Belt Conference women's basketball tournament =

- Classification: Division I
- Season: 2013–14
- Teams: 8
- Site: Lakefront Arena; New Orleans, Louisiana
- Champions: Western Kentucky (9th title)
- Winning coach: Michelle Clark-Heard (1st title)
- MVP: Chastity Gooch (Western Kentucky)
- Television: Sun Belt Network, ESPN3

2013–14 Sun Belt Conference women's basketball standings
	Conf.				Overall
Team	W		L	PCT	W		L	PCT
Arkansas State	14	–	4	.778	22	–	12	.647
Western Kentucky †	13	–	5	.722	24	–	9	.727
Arkansas–Little Rock	12	–	6	.667	18	–	12	.600
Texas State	12	–	6	.667	16	–	16	.500
Troy	8	–	10	.444	12	–	18	.400
Georgia State	8	–	10	.444	12	–	19	.387
Louisiana–Lafayette	7	–	11	.389	14	–	16	.467
Louisiana–Monroe	7	–	11	.389	11	–	20	.355
South Alabama	6	–	12	.333	8	–	20	.286
Texas–Arlington	3	–	15	.167	4	–	25	.138
† 2014 Sun Belt tournament winner

The 2014 Sun Belt Conference women's basketball tournament was the postseason women's basketball tournament for the Sun Belt Conference beginning on March 12, 2014, and ending on March 15, 2014, in New Orleans, Louisiana at the Lakefront Arena.

== Seeds ==
2014 Sun Belt women's basketball tournament seeds and results
Seed	School	Conf.	Over.	Tiebreaker
1	‡Arkansas State	14–4	20–10	
2	Western Kentucky	13–5	21–8	
3	Arkansas-Little Rock	12–6	17–11	
4	Texas State	12–6	15–14	
5	Troy	8–10	12–17	
6	Georgia State	8–10	12–18	
7	Louisiana-Lafayette	7–11	14–15	
8	Louisiana-Monroe	7–11	11–19	
‡ – Sun Belt Conference regular season champions.

== Schedule ==
Game	Time*	Matchup^{#}	Score	Television
Quarterfinals – Wednesday, March 12
1	12:00 pm	#1 Arkansas State vs. #8 Louisiana-Monroe	78–69	
2	2:30 pm	#4 Texas State vs. #5 Georgia State	78–44	
3	6:00 pm	#2 Western Kentucky vs. #7 Louisiana-Lafayette	67–61	
4	8:30 pm	#3 Arkansas-Little Rock vs. #6 Troy	66–54	
Semifinals – Friday, March 14
5	12:00 pm	#1 Arkansas State vs. #4 Texas State	59–48	Sun Belt Network
6	2:30 pm	#2 Western Kentucky vs. #3 Arkansas-Little Rock	66–62	Sun Belt Network
Championship Game – Saturday, March 15
7	8:00 pm	#1 Arkansas State vs. #2 Western Kentucky	60–61	ESPN3
*Game Times in CT. # – Rankings denote tournament seed

== Bracket ==
Quarterfinals; Wednesday, March 12
1	Arkansas State	78
8	Louisiana-Monroe	69
4	Texas State	78
5	Georgia State	44
2	Western Kentucky	67
7	Louisiana-Lafayette	61
3	Arkansas-Little Rock	66
6	Troy	54

Semifinals; Friday, March 14
1	Arkansas State	59
4	Texas State	48
2	Western Kentucky	66
3	Arkansas-Little Rock	62

Championship; Saturday, March 15
1	Arkansas State	60
2	Western Kentucky	61

== See also ==
2014 Sun Belt Conference men's basketball tournament
