= Big 12 Conference women's basketball tournament =

Collegiate basketball tournament in the United States

- Conference basketball championship
- The Big 12 Conference Women's Basketball Championship logo
- Sport: Basketball
- Conference: Big 12 Conference
- Number of teams: 16
- Format: Single-elimination tournament
- Current stadium: T-Mobile Center
- Current location: Kansas City, Missouri
- Played: 1997-present
- Last contest: 2026
- Current champion: West Virginia
- Most championships: Baylor Bears (10)
- TV partner: ESPN
- Official website: Big12Sports.com Women's Basketball

Sponsors
- Phillips 66 (1997-present)

Host stadiums
- Municipal Auditorium (1997-2002, 2005, 2008, 2010-2012, 2020-2023); Cox Convention Center (2007, 2009); Reunion Arena (2003, 2004, 2006); American Airlines Center (2013, 2015); Chesapeake Energy Arena (2014, 2016–2019); T-Mobile Center (2024–2031)

Host locations
- Kansas City, Missouri (1997-2002, 2005, 2008, 2010-2012, 2020-2031); Oklahoma City, Oklahoma (2007, 2009, 2014, 2016-2019); Dallas, Texas (2003, 2004, 2006, 2013, 2015)

Former logo

The Big 12 Conference women's basketball tournament is the championship women's basketball tournament in the Big 12 Conference. The tournament is set to be held at the T-Mobile Center in Kansas City, Missouri until 2031. Due to a major conference realignment that significantly impacted the Big 12, the 2025 women's tournament was the first tournament with 16 teams participating. At the beginning of the 2024–25 season, Arizona, Arizona State, Colorado, and Utah joined the conference. The tournament is sponsored by Phillips 66. The Tournament has been held every year since 1997, except in 2020 when it was cancelled due to the coronavirus pandemic.

All sixteen teams will participate in the tournament. The top eight teams will receive a first round bye and the top four teams will receive a double bye, automatically advancing them into the quarterfinals. Seeding is based on regular season records, ties will be broken using a tiebreaker system, with the first tiebreaker being best record in head-to-head matchups then the 2nd tiebreaker being head-to-head record against each team in the conference beginning with the first place team and working down.

The championship game will be played on a Sunday, unless BYU advances to the final thus pushing the championship game to a Monday finish

== Champions ==
Tournament champions receive an automatic bid to the year's NCAA Women's Division I Basketball Championship. Numbers in parentheses refer to each team's finish/seed in the tournament for that year.

Year	Champion	Runner-up	Most Outstanding Player	Location	Attendance
1997	(3) Colorado 54	(5) Kansas State 44	Andria Jones, Kansas State	Municipal Auditorium • Kansas City, Missouri	18,700
1998	(1) Texas Tech 71	(3) Kansas 53	Alicia Thompson, Texas Tech	Municipal Auditorium • Kansas City, Missouri	18,774
1999	(1) Texas Tech 73	(2) Iowa State 59	Angie Braziel, Texas Tech	Municipal Auditorium • Kansas City, Missouri	30,968
2000	(1) Iowa State 75	(6) Texas 65	Edwina Brown, Texas	Municipal Auditorium • Kansas City, Missouri	29,961
2001	(3) Iowa State 68	(1) Oklahoma 65	Angie Welle, Iowa State	Municipal Auditorium • Kansas City, Missouri	31,831
2002	(1) Oklahoma 84	(2) Baylor 69	Stacey Dales, Oklahoma	Municipal Auditorium • Kansas City, Missouri	32,953
2003	(1) Texas 67	(3) Texas Tech 57	Stacy Stephens, Texas	Reunion Arena • Dallas, Texas	35,619
2004	(6) Oklahoma 66	(1) Texas 47	Dionnah Jackson, Oklahoma	Reunion Arena • Dallas, Texas	34,851
2005	(1) Baylor 68	(3) Kansas State 55	Sophia Young, Baylor	Municipal Auditorium • Kansas City, Missouri	26,929
2006	(1) Oklahoma 72	(2) Baylor 61	Courtney Paris, Oklahoma	Reunion Arena • Dallas, Texas	25,551
2007	(1) Oklahoma 67	(5) Iowa State 60	Courtney Paris, Oklahoma	Cox Convention Center • Oklahoma City, Oklahoma	48,990
2008	(4) Texas A&M 64	(3) Oklahoma State 59	Takia Starks, Texas A&M	Municipal Auditorium • Kansas City, Missouri	24,190
2009	(2) Baylor 72	(4) Texas A&M 63	Jessica Morrow, Baylor	Cox Convention Center • Oklahoma City, Oklahoma	35,515
2010	(4) Texas A&M 74	(3) Oklahoma 67	Danielle Adams, Texas A&M	Municipal Auditorium • Kansas City, Missouri	25,412
2011	(1) Baylor 61	(2) Texas A&M 58	Brittney Griner, Baylor	Municipal Auditorium • Kansas City, Missouri	25,400
2012	(1) Baylor 73	(3) Texas A&M 50	Brittney Griner, Baylor	Municipal Auditorium • Kansas City, Missouri	22,833
2013	(1) Baylor 75	(2) Iowa State 47	Brittney Griner, Baylor	American Airlines Center • Dallas, Texas	35,183
2014	(1) Baylor 74	(2) West Virginia 71	Nina Davis, Baylor	Chesapeake Energy Arena • Oklahoma City, Oklahoma	24,387
2015	(1) Baylor 75	(6) Texas 64	Nina Davis, Baylor	American Airlines Center • Dallas, Texas	21,155
2016	(1) Baylor 79	(2) Texas 63	Alexis Jones, Baylor	Chesapeake Energy Arena • Oklahoma City, Oklahoma	20,672
2017	(6) West Virginia 77	(1) Baylor 66	Tynice Martin, West Virginia	Chesapeake Energy Arena • Oklahoma City, Oklahoma	17,369
2018	(1) Baylor 77	(2) Texas 69	Kalani Brown, Baylor	Chesapeake Energy Arena • Oklahoma City, Oklahoma	17,854
2019	(1) Baylor 67	(2) Iowa State 49	Kalani Brown, Baylor	Chesapeake Energy Arena • Oklahoma City, Oklahoma	16,823
2020	Canceled due to COVID-19				
2021	(1) Baylor 76	(2) West Virginia 50	NaLyssa Smith, Baylor	Municipal Auditorium • Kansas City, Missouri	3,783
2022	(3) Texas 67	(1) Baylor 58	Rori Harmon, Texas	Municipal Auditorium • Kansas City, Missouri	20,415
2023	(3) Iowa State 67	(1) Texas 58	Ashley Joens, Iowa State	Municipal Auditorium • Kansas City, Missouri	25,385
2024	(2) Texas 70	(4) Iowa State 53	Madison Booker, Texas	T-Mobile Center • Kansas City, Missouri	33,128
2025	(1) TCU 64	(2) Baylor 59	Hailey Van Lith, TCU	T-Mobile Center • Kansas City, Missouri	39,188
2026	(2) West Virginia 62	(1) TCU 53	Jordan Harrison, West Virginia	T-Mobile Center • Kansas City, Missouri	39,066
2027				T-Mobile Center • Kansas City, Missouri	
2028				T-Mobile Center • Kansas City, Missouri	
2029				T-Mobile Center • Kansas City, Missouri	
2030				T-Mobile Center • Kansas City, Missouri	
2031				T-Mobile Center • Kansas City, Missouri	

=== By school ===
Tournament record by school through the 2024 tournament. Former conference members as of the upcoming 2024–25 season are in italics. Arizona, Arizona State, and Utah will play their first Big 12 seasons in 2024–25.

School	Appearances	W	L	Pct.	Titles	Title Years
Baylor	27	49	16	.754	11	2005, 2009, 2011, 2012, 2013, 2014, 2015, 2016, 2018, 2019, 2021
Colorado	15	8	14	.364	1	1997
Iowa State	27	33	24	.579	3	2000, 2001, 2023
Kansas	27	15	27	.357	0	
Kansas State	27	23	27	.460	0	
Missouri	16	7	16	.304	0	
Nebraska	15	8	15	.348	0	
Oklahoma	27	28	23	.549	4	2002, 2004, 2006, 2007
Oklahoma State	27	18	27	.400	0	
TCU	12	8	11	.421	1	2025
Texas	27	36	24	.600	3	2003, 2022, 2024
Texas A&M	16	15	14	.517	2	2008, 2010
Texas Tech	27	19	25	.432	2	1998, 1999
West Virginia	11	12	10	.545	1	2017

== Championship game results by team ==
Appearances	School	Wins	Losses	Last Appearance
15	Baylor	11	4	2025
6	Oklahoma	4	2	2010
9	Texas	3	6	2024
8	Iowa State	3	5	2024
5	Texas A&M	2	3	2012
4	West Virginia	2	2	2026
3	Texas Tech	2	1	2003
2	TCU	1	1	2026
2	Kansas State	0	2	2005
1	Colorado	1	0	1997
1	Oklahoma State	0	1	2008
1	Kansas	0	1	1998

- Arizona, Arizona State, BYU, Cincinnati, Houston, UCF and Utah have not made an appearance in the championship game.
- Schools highlighted in pink are former Big 12 members.

== See also ==
- Southwest Conference women's basketball tournament
- Big 12 men's basketball tournament
- NCAA Division I women's basketball tournament
