= Big 12 Conference Women's Basketball Player of the Year =

Big 12 Women's Basketball Player of the Year
- Awarded for: the most outstanding basketball player in the Big 12 Conference
- Country: United States
- Presented by: Phillips 66
- First award: 1997
- Currently held by: Olivia Miles, TCU

The Big 12 Conference Women's Basketball Player of the Year is a basketball award given to the Big 12 Conference's most outstanding player. The award was first given following the 1996–97 season, the first year of conference competition but three years after the conference's official formation. As with the corresponding men's award, it is selected by the league's head coaches, who are not allowed to vote for their own players.

Five players have won the award more than once. Stacey Dales of Oklahoma, Nicole Ohlde of Kansas State, and NaLyssa Smith of Baylor have won twice, and Courtney Paris of Oklahoma and Brittney Griner of Baylor have won three times. Only the two three-time winners (Paris and Griner) and 2015 recipient Nina Davis of Baylor have won as sophomores. The first shared award went to Madison Booker of Texas and Skylar Vann of Oklahoma in 2024, with Booker being the first freshman to be so honored.

Three players, all from Baylor, have won a major end-of-season national award in the year that they won the Big 12 award. Griner won all three major national awards (Naismith Award, Wade Trophy, and Wooden Award) in both 2012 and 2013, and Odyssey Sims and Smith were Wade Trophy recipients, respectively in 2014 and 2021.

== Key ==
†	Co-Players of the Year
*	Awarded a national player of the year award that same season: Wade Trophy (1977–78 to present); Naismith College Player of the Year (1982–83 to present); John R. Wooden Award (2003–04 to present)
Player (X)	Denotes the number of times the player has been awarded the Big 12 Player of the Year award at that point

== Winners ==
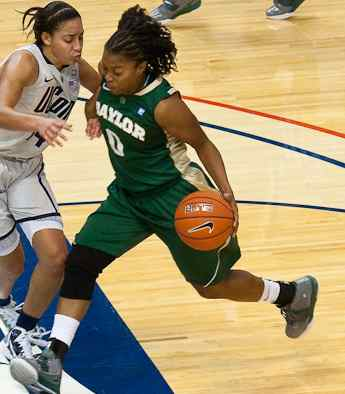
Baylor's Odyssey Sims (with ball) won the Wade Trophy along with the Big 12 award in 2014.

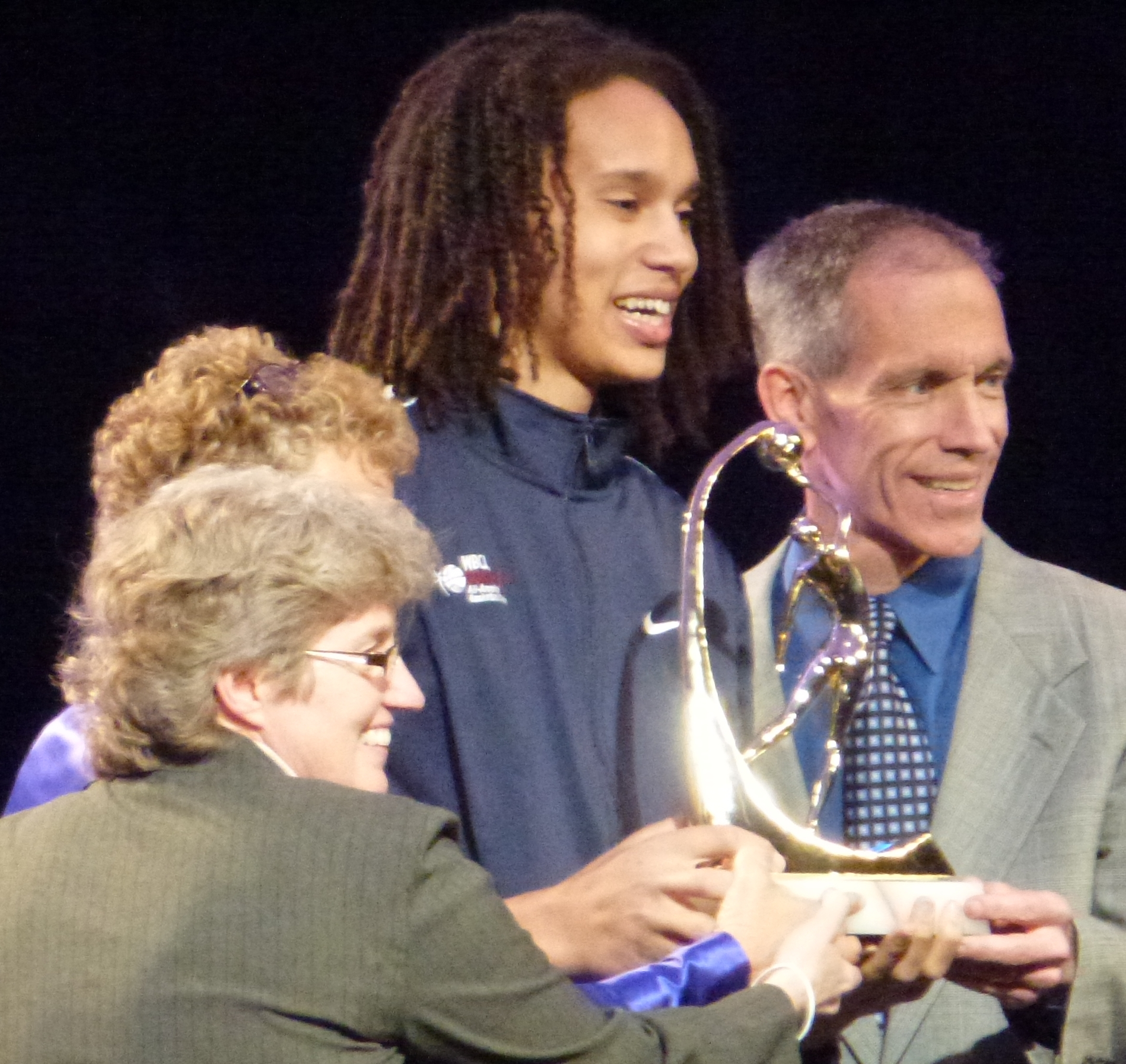
Baylor's Brittney Griner, one of two three-time winners, was the consensus National Player of the Year when she won the award in both 2012 and 2013.

Season	Player	School	Position	Class	Reference
1996–97	Tamecka Dixon	Kansas	G	Senior	
1997–98	Alicia Thompson	Texas Tech	C	Senior	
1998–99	Angie Braziel	Texas Tech	C	Senior	
1999–2000	Phylesha Whaley	Oklahoma	F	Senior	
2000–01	Stacey Dales	Oklahoma	G	Junior	
2001–02	Stacey Dales (2)	Oklahoma	G	Senior	
2002–03	Nicole Ohlde	Kansas State	F/C	Junior	
2003–04	Nicole Ohlde (2)	Kansas State	F/C	Senior	
2004–05	Kendra Wecker	Kansas State	F	Senior	
2005–06	Sophia Young	Baylor	F	Senior	
2006–07	Courtney Paris	Oklahoma	C	Sophomore	
2007–08	Courtney Paris (2)	Oklahoma	C	Junior	
2008–09	Courtney Paris (3)	Oklahoma	C	Senior	
2009–10	Kelsey Griffin	Nebraska	F	Senior	
2010–11	Brittney Griner	Baylor	C	Sophomore	
2011–12	Brittney Griner* (2)	Baylor	C	Junior	
2012–13	Brittney Griner* (3)	Baylor	C	Senior	
2013–14	Odyssey Sims*	Baylor	G	Senior	
2014–15	Nina Davis	Baylor	F	Sophomore	
2015–16	Brittney Martin	Oklahoma State	G	Senior	
2016–17	Brooke McCarty-Williams	Texas	G	Junior	
2017–18	Kalani Brown	Baylor	C	Junior	
2018–19	Bridget Carleton	Iowa State	G	Senior	
2019–20	Lauren Cox	Baylor	F	Senior	
2020–21	NaLyssa Smith*	Baylor	F	Junior	
2021–22	NaLyssa Smith (2)	Baylor	F	Senior	
2022–23	Ashley Joens	Iowa State	G/F	Senior (5th-year) (Note: The NCAA did not count the 2020–21 season, heavily impacted by COVID-19, against the eligibility of any basketball player. Joens chose to take advantage of this extra season of eligibility in 2022–23.)	
2023–24^{†}	Madison Booker	Texas	F	Freshman	
2023–24^{†}	Skylar Vann	Oklahoma	F	Senior	
2024–25	Hailey Van Lith	TCU	G	Senior (5th-year)	
2025–26	Olivia Miles	TCU	G	Senior (5th-year)	

== Winners by school ==
School (year joined) (Note: Reflects the calendar year in which the school joined the Big 12.)	Winners	Years (Note: Reflects the calendar year in which the basketball season ends.)
Baylor (1996)	10	2006, 2011, 2012, 2013, 2014, 2015, 2018, 2020, 2021, 2022
Oklahoma (1996) (Note: Oklahoma and Texas left for the SEC in 2024.)	7	2000, 2001, 2002, 2007, 2008, 2009, 2024†
Kansas State (1996)	3	2003, 2004, 2005
Iowa State (1996)	2	2019, 2023
Texas (1996)	2	2017, 2024†
TCU (2012)	2	2025, 2026
Texas Tech (1996)	2	1998, 1999
Kansas (1996)	1	1997
Nebraska (1996) (Note: Nebraska left in 2011 to join the Big Ten.)	1	2010
Oklahoma State (1996)	1	2016
Arizona (2024)	0	—
Arizona State (2024)	0	—
BYU (2023)	0	—
Cincinnati (2023)	0	—
Colorado (1996/2024) (Note: Colorado left in 2011 to join what is now known as the Pac-12, but rejoined the Big 12 in 2024.)	0	—
Houston (2023)	0	—
Missouri (1996) (Note: Missouri and Texas A&M left in 2012 to join the SEC.)	0	—
Texas A&M (1996)	0	—
UCF (2023)	0	—
Utah (2024)	0	—
West Virginia (2012)	0	—
