= 1998 Big 12 Conference women's basketball tournament =

- Classification: Division I
- Teams: 12
- Site: Municipal Auditorium; Kansas City, Missouri
- Champions: Texas Tech (1st title)
- Winning coach: Marsha Sharp (1st title)
- MVP: Alicia Thompson (Texas Tech)
- Attendance: 18,774 (overall); 5,800 (championship)
- Television: Metro Sports, FSN

1997–98 Big 12 Conference women's basketball standings
	Conf.				Overall
Team	W		L	PCT	W		L	PCT
No. 6 Texas Tech †	15	–	1	.938	26	–	5	.839
No. 24 Iowa State	12	–	4	.750	25	–	8	.758
Kansas	11	–	5	.688	23	–	9	.719
Nebraska	11	–	5	.688	23	–	10	.697
Oklahoma State	10	–	6	.625	20	–	11	.645
Baylor	10	–	6	.625	20	–	11	.645
Texas	7	–	9	.438	12	–	15	.444
Colorado	5	–	11	.313	12	–	16	.429
Oklahoma	4	–	12	.250	8	–	19	.296
Texas A&M	4	–	12	.250	9	–	19	.321
Kansas State	4	–	12	.250	11	–	17	.393
Missouri	3	–	13	.188	11	–	16	.407
† 1998 Big 12 Tournament winner Rankings from AP poll

The 1998 Big 12 Conference women's basketball tournament was held March 3–7, 1998, at Municipal Auditorium in Kansas City, MO.

Number 1 seed Texas Tech defeated number 3 seed Kansas 71–53 to win their first championship and receive the conference's automatic bid to the 1998 NCAA tournament.

== Seeding ==
The Tournament consisted of a 12 team single-elimination tournament with the top 4 seeds receiving a bye.

1998 Big 12 Conference women's basketball tournament seeds
Seed	School	Conf.	Over.	Tiebreaker
1	Texas Tech ‡#	15–1	26–5	
2	Iowa State #	12–4	25–8	
3	Kansas #	11–5	23–9	
4	Nebraska #	11–5	23–10	
5	Oklahoma State	10–6	20–11	
6	Baylor	10–6	20–11	
7	Texas	7–9	12–15	
8	Colorado	5–11	12–16	
9	Oklahoma	4–12	8–19	
10	Texas A&M	4–12	9–19	
11	Kansas State	4–12	11–17	
12	Missouri	3–13	11–16	
‡ – Big 12 Conference regular season champions, and tournament No. 1 seed. # – Received a single-bye in the conference tournament. Overall records include all games played in the Big 12 Conference tournament.

== Schedule ==
Session	Game	Time	Matchup	Television	Attendance
First round – Tuesday, March 3
1	1	12:00 pm	#8 Colorado 71 vs #9 Oklahoma 66		1,560
1	2	2:20 pm	#5 Oklahoma State 67 vs #12 Missouri 48		1,560
2	3	6:00 pm	#10 Texas A&M 98 vs #7 Texas 74		2,162
2	4	8:20 pm	#11 Kansas State 71 vs #6 Baylor 66 ^{OT}		2,162
Quarterfinals – Wednesday, March 4
3	5	12:00 pm	#1 Texas Tech 80 vs #8 Colorado 49	Metro Sports	1,700
3	6	2:20 pm	#5 Oklahoma State 83 vs #4 Nebraska 69	Metro Sports	1,700
4	7	6:00 pm	#2 Iowa State 88 vs #10 Texas A&M 68	Metro Sports	4,052
4	8	8:20 pm	#3 Kansas 50 vs #11 Kansas State 46	Metro Sports	4,052
Semifinals – Thursday, March 5
5	9	5:00 pm	#1 Texas Tech 53 vs #5 Oklahoma State 49	FSN	3,500
5	10	7:20 pm	#3 Kansas 70 vs #2 Iowa State 65	FSN	3,500
Final – Saturday, March 7
6	11	7:00 pm	#1 Texas Tech 71 vs #3 Kansas 53	FSN	5,800
Game times in CT. #-Rankings denote tournament seed

== Tournament ==
First round Tuesday, March 3
8	Colorado	71
9	Oklahoma	66
5	Oklahoma State	67
12	Missouri	48
6	Baylor	66
11	Kansas State	71 (OT)
7	Texas	74
10	Texas A&M	98

Quarterfinals; Wednesday, March 4
1	Texas Tech	84
8	Colorado	49
4	Nebraska	69
5	Oklahoma State	83
3	Kansas	50
11	Kansas State	46
2	Iowa State	88
10	Texas A&M	68

Semifinals; Thursday, March 5
1	Texas Tech	53
5	Oklahoma State	49
3	Kansas	70
2	Iowa State	65

Finals; Saturday, March 7
1	Texas Tech	71
3	Kansas	53

== All-Tournament team ==
Most Outstanding Player – Alicia Thompson, Texas Tech

Player	Team
Alicia Thompson	Texas Tech
Angie Braziel	Texas Tech
Stacy Frese	Iowa State
Lynn Pride	Kansas
Cheri Edwards	Oklahoma State

== See also ==
- 1998 Big 12 Conference men's basketball tournament
- 1998 NCAA Division I women's basketball tournament
- 1997–98 NCAA Division I women's basketball rankings
