= 1999 Big 12 Conference women's basketball tournament =

- Classification: Division I
- Teams: 12
- Site: Municipal Auditorium; Kansas City, Missouri
- Champions: Texas Tech (2nd title)
- Winning coach: Marsha Sharp (2nd title)
- MVP: Angie Braziel (Texas Tech)
- Attendance: 30,968 (overall); 8,127 (championship)
- Television: Metro Sports, FSN

1998–99 Big 12 Conference women's basketball standings
	Conf.				Overall
Team	W		L	PCT	W		L	PCT
No. 6 Texas Tech †	14	–	2	.875	30	–	4	.882
No. 19 Iowa State	12	–	4	.750	25	–	8	.758
Kansas	11	–	5	.688	23	–	10	.697
Texas	10	–	6	.625	16	–	12	.571
Nebraska	8	–	8	.500	21	–	12	.636
Oklahoma	8	–	8	.500	15	–	14	.517
Baylor	8	–	8	.500	17	–	14	.548
Kansas State	7	–	9	.438	16	–	14	.533
Colorado	7	–	9	.438	15	–	14	.517
Missouri	5	–	11	.313	13	–	15	.464
Oklahoma State	4	–	12	.250	13	–	15	.464
Texas A&M	2	–	14	.125	7	–	20	.259
† 1999 Big 12 Tournament winner Rankings from AP poll

The 1999 Big 12 Conference women's basketball tournament was held March 2–6, 1999, at Municipal Auditorium in Kansas City, MO.

Number 1 seed Texas Tech defeated 2 seed Iowa State 73–59 to win their 2nd championship and receive the conference's automatic bid to the 1999 NCAA tournament.

== Seeding ==
The Tournament consisted of a 12 team single-elimination tournament with the top 4 seeds receiving a bye.

1999 Big 12 Conference women's basketball tournament seeds
Seed	School	Conf.	Over.	Tiebreaker
1	Texas Tech ‡#	14–2	30–4	
2	Iowa State #	12–4	25–8	
3	Kansas #	11–5	23–10	
4	Texas #	10–6	16–12	
5	Nebraska	8–8	21–12	
6	Oklahoma	8–8	15–14	
7	Baylor	8–8	17–14	
8	Kansas State	7–9	16–14	
9	Colorado	7–9	15–14	
10	Missouri	5–11	13–15	
11	Oklahoma State	4–12	13–15	
12	Texas A&M	2–14	7–20	
‡ – Big 12 Conference regular season champions, and tournament No. 1 seed. # – Received a single-bye in the conference tournament. Overall records include all games played in the Big 12 Conference tournament.

== Schedule ==
Session	Game	Time	Matchup	Television	Attendance
First round – Tuesday, March 2
1	1	12:00 pm	#8 Kansas State 55 vs #9 Colorado 51		2,946
1	2	2:20 pm	#5 Nebraska 82 vs #12 Texas A&M 71		2,946
2	3	6:00 pm	#10 Missouri 60 vs #7 Baylor 55		3,264
2	4	8:20 pm	#11 Oklahoma State 70 vs #6 Oklahoma 56		3,264
Quarterfinals – Wednesday, March 3
3	5	12:00 pm	#1 Texas Tech 74 vs #8 Kansas State 55	Metro Sports	5,264
3	6	2:27 pm	#5 Nebraska 60 vs #4 Texas 55	Metro Sports	5,264
4	7	6:00 pm	#2 Iowa State 63 vs #10 Missouri 44	Metro Sports	5,137
4	8	8:20 pm	#3 Kansas 59 vs #11 Oklahoma State 53	Metro Sports	5,137
Semifinals – Thursday, March 4
5	9	5:00 pm	#1 Texas Tech 77 vs #5 Nebraska 59	FSN	6,230
5	10	7:30 pm	#2 Iowa State 79 vs #3 Kansas 64	FSN	6,230
Final – Saturday, March 6
6	11	7:00 pm	#1 Texas Tech 73 vs #2 Iowa State 59	FSN	8,127
Game times in CT. #-Rankings denote tournament seed

== Tournament ==
First round Tuesday, March 2
8	Kansas State	55
9	Colorado	51
5	Nebraska	82
12	Texas A&M	71
6	Oklahoma	56
11	Oklahoma State	70
7	Baylor	55
10	Missouri	60

Quarterfinals; Wednesday, March 3
1	Texas Tech	74
8	Kansas State	55
4	Texas	55
5	Nebraska	60
3	Kansas	59
11	Oklahoma State	53
2	Iowa State	63
10	Missouri	44

Semifinals; Thursday, March 4
1	Texas Tech	77
5	Nebraska	59
3	Kansas	64
2	Iowa State	79

Finals; Saturday, March 6
1	Texas Tech	73
2	Iowa State	59

== All-Tournament team ==
Most Outstanding Player – Angie Braziel, Texas Tech

Player	Team
Angie Braziel	Texas Tech
Stacy Frese	Iowa State
Megan Taylor	Iowa State
Rene Hanebutt	Texas Tech
Julie Lake	Texas Tech

== See also ==
- 1999 Big 12 Conference men's basketball tournament
- 1999 NCAA Division I women's basketball tournament
- 1998–99 NCAA Division I women's basketball rankings
