= 1997 Big 12 Conference women's basketball tournament =

- Classification: Division I
- Teams: 12
- Site: Municipal Auditorium; Kansas City, Missouri
- Champions: Colorado (1st title)
- Winning coach: Ceal Barry (1st title)
- MVP: Andria Jones (Kansas State)
- Attendance: 18,700 (overall); 7,152 (championship)
- Television: FSN

1996–97 Big 12 Conference women's basketball standings
	Conf.				Overall
Team	W		L	PCT	W		L	PCT
No. 11 Kansas	14	–	2	.875	25	–	6	.806
No. 14 Texas	12	–	4	.750	22	–	8	.733
No. 18 Colorado †	12	–	4	.750	23	–	9	.719
No. 17 Texas Tech	11	–	5	.688	20	–	9	.690
Kansas State	9	–	7	.563	19	–	12	.613
Iowa State	9	–	7	.563	17	–	12	.586
Nebraska	8	–	8	.500	19	–	9	.679
Oklahoma State	7	–	9	.438	15	–	12	.556
Baylor	7	–	9	.438	15	–	13	.536
Missouri	3	–	13	.188	10	–	20	.333
Texas A&M	3	–	13	.188	9	–	18	.333
Oklahoma	1	–	15	.063	5	–	22	.185
† 1997 Big 12 Tournament winner Rankings from AP poll

The 1997 Big 12 Conference women's basketball tournament was held March 4–8, 1997, at Municipal Auditorium in Kansas City, MO.

Number 3 seed Colorado defeated number 5 seed Kansas State 54–44 to win their first championship and receive the conference's automatic bid to the 1997 NCAA tournament.

== Seeding ==
The Tournament consisted of a 12 team single-elimination tournament with the top 4 seeds receiving a bye.

1997 Big 12 Conference women's basketball tournament seeds
Seed	School	Conf.	Over.	Tiebreaker
1	Kansas ‡#	14–2	25–6	
2	Texas #	12–4	22–8	
3	Colorado #	12–4	23–9	
4	Texas Tech #	11–5	20–9	
5	Kansas State	9–7	19–12	
6	Iowa State	9–7	17–12	
7	Nebraska	8–8	19–9	
8	Oklahoma State	7–9	15–12	
9	Baylor	7–9	15–13	
10	Missouri	3–13	10–20	
11	Texas A&M	3–13	9–18	
12	Oklahoma	1–15	5–22	
‡ – Big 12 Conference regular season champions, and tournament No. 1 seed. # – Received a single-bye in the conference tournament. Overall records include all games played in the Big 12 Conference tournament.

== Schedule ==
Session	Game	Time	Matchup	Television	Attendance
First round – Tuesday, March 4
1	1	12:00 pm	#9 Baylor 68 vs #8 Oklahoma State 62		1,124
1	2	2:30 pm	#5 Kansas State 81 vs #12 Oklahoma 56		1,124
2	3	6:00 pm	#7 Nebraska 62 vs #10 Missouri 58		1,768
2	4	8:30 pm	#6 Iowa State 53 vs #11 Texas A&M 41		1,768
Quarterfinals – Wednesday, March 5
3	5	12:00 pm	#1 Kansas 66 vs #9 Baylor 54		2,421
3	6	2:20 pm	#5 Kansas State 76 vs #4 Texas Tech 68		2,421
4	7	6:00 pm	#2 Texas 74 vs #7 Nebraska 68		2,670
4	8	8:20 pm	#3 Colorado 56 vs #6 Iowa State 39		2,670
Semifinals – Thursday, March 6
5	9	5:00 pm	#5 Kansas State 73 vs #1 Kansas 58	FSN	3,565
5	10	7:30 pm	#3 Colorado 64 vs #2 Texas 50	FSN	3,565
Final – Saturday, March 8
6	11	7:00 pm	#3 Colorado 54 vs #5 Kansas State 44	FSN	7,152
Game times in CT. #-Rankings denote tournament seed

== Tournament ==
First round Tuesday, March 4
8	Oklahoma State	62
9	Baylor	68
5	Kansas State	81
12	Oklahoma	56
6	Iowa State	53
11	Texas A&M	41
7	Nebraska	62
10	Missouri	58

Quarterfinals; Wednesday, March 5
1	Kansas	66
9	Baylor	54
4	Texas Tech	68
5	Kansas State	76
3	Colorado	56
6	Iowa State	39
2	Texas	74
7	Nebraska	68

Semifinals; Thursday, March 6
1	Kansas	58
5	Kansas State	73
3	Colorado	64
2	Texas	50

Finals; Saturday, March 8
5	Kansas State	44
3	Colorado	55

== All-Tournament team ==
Most Outstanding Player – Andria Jones, Kansas State

Player	Team
Andria Jones	Kansas State
La Shena Graham	Colorado
Brit Jacobson	Kansas State
Tamecka Dixon	Kansas
Erin Scholz	Colorado

== See also ==
- 1997 Big 12 Conference men's basketball tournament
- 1997 NCAA Division I women's basketball tournament
- 1996–97 NCAA Division I women's basketball rankings
