= 2001 Big 12 Conference women's basketball tournament =

Basketball Tournament

- Classification: Division I
- Teams: 12
- Site: Municipal Auditorium; Kansas City, Missouri
- Champions: Iowa State (2nd title)
- Winning coach: Bill Fennelly (2nd title)
- MVP: Angie Welle (Iowa State)
- Attendance: 31,831 (overall); 8,153 (championship)
- Television: CSSW, FSN

2000–01 Big 12 Conference women's basketball standings
	Conf.				Overall
Team	W		L	PCT	W		L	PCT
No. 7 Oklahoma	15	–	1	.938	28	–	6	.824
No. 13 Texas Tech	13	–	3	.813	25	–	7	.781
No. 8 Iowa State †	12	–	4	.750	27	–	6	.818
No. 20 Colorado	11	–	5	.688	22	–	9	.710
Missouri	10	–	6	.625	22	–	10	.688
No. 23 Baylor	9	–	7	.563	21	–	9	.700
Texas	7	–	9	.438	20	–	13	.606
Oklahoma State	6	–	10	.375	16	–	15	.516
Kansas	5	–	11	.313	12	–	17	.414
Nebraska	4	–	12	.250	12	–	18	.400
Kansas State	2	–	14	.125	12	–	16	.429
Texas A&M	2	–	14	.125	12	–	16	.429
† 2001 Big 12 Tournament winner Rankings from AP poll

The 2001 Big 12 Conference women's basketball tournament was held March 6–10, 2001, at Municipal Auditorium in Kansas City, MO.

Number 3 seed Iowa State defeated number 1 seed Oklahoma 68–65 to win their 2nd championship and receive the conference's automatic bid to the 2001 NCAA tournament.

== Seeding ==
The Tournament consisted of a 12 team single-elimination tournament with the top 4 seeds receiving a bye.

2001 Big 12 Conference women's basketball tournament seeds
Seed	School	Conf.	Over.	Tiebreaker
1	Oklahoma ‡#	15–1	28–6	
2	Texas Tech #	13–3	25–7	
3	Iowa State #	12–4	27–6	
4	Colorado #	11–5	22–9	
5	Missouri	10–6	22–10	
6	Baylor	9–7	21–9	
7	Texas	7–9	20–13	
8	Oklahoma State	6–10	16–15	
9	Kansas	5–11	12–17	
10	Nebraska	4–12	12–18	
11	Kansas State	2–14	12–16	
12	Texas A&M	2–14	12–16	
‡ – Big 12 Conference regular season champions, and tournament No. 1 seed. # – Received a single-bye in the conference tournament. Overall records include all games played in the Big 12 Conference tournament.

== Schedule ==
Session	Game	Time	Matchup	Television	Attendance
First round – Tuesday, March 6
1	1	12:00 pm	#9 Kansas 66 vs #8 Oklahoma State 56	CSSW	6,077
1	2	2:20 pm	#5 Missouri 75 vs #12 Texas A&M 65	CSSW	6,077
2	3	6:00 pm	#7 Texas 77 vs #10 Nebraska 60	CSSW	2,454
2	4	8:20 pm	#6 Baylor 60 vs #11 Kansas State 44	CSSW	2,454
Quarterfinals – Wednesday, March 7
3	5	12:00 pm	#1 Oklahoma 80 vs #9 Kansas 61	CSSW	3,221
3	6	2:20 pm	#4 Colorado 83 vs #5 Missouri 72	CSSW	3,221
4	7	6:00 pm	#2 Texas Tech 71 vs #7 Texas 58	CSSW	6,408
4	8	8:20 pm	#3 Iowa State 73 vs #6 Baylor 48	CSSW	6,408
Semifinals – Thursday, March 8
5	9	5:00 pm	#1 Oklahoma 102 vs #4 Colorado 93	FSN	5,518
5	10	7:30 pm	#3 Iowa State 73 vs #2 Texas Tech 62	FSN	5,518
Final – Saturday, March 10
6	11	7:00 pm	#3 Iowa State 68 vs #1 Oklahoma 65	FSN	8,153
Game times in CT. #-Rankings denote tournament seed

== Tournament ==
First round Tuesday, March 6
8	Oklahoma State	56
9	Kansas	66
5	Missouri	75
12	Texas A&M	65
6	Baylor	60
11	Kansas State	44
7	Texas	77
10	Nebraska	60

Quarterfinals; Wednesday, March 7
1	Oklahoma	80
9	Kansas	61
4	Colorado	83
5	Missouri	72
3	Iowa State	73
6	Baylor	48
2	Texas Tech	71
7	Texas	58

Semifinals; Thursday, March 8
1	Oklahoma	102
4	Colorado	93
3	Iowa State	73
2	Texas Tech	62

Finals; Saturday, March 10
1	Oklahoma	65
3	Iowa State	68

== All-Tournament team ==
Most Outstanding Player – Angie Welle, Iowa State

Player	Team
Angie Welle	Iowa State
Megan Taylor	Iowa State
Lindsey Wilson	Iowa State
Stacey Dales	Oklahoma
Rosalind Ross	Oklahoma

== See also ==
- 2001 Big 12 Conference men's basketball tournament
- 2001 NCAA Division I women's basketball tournament
- 2000–01 NCAA Division I women's basketball rankings
