= 2007 Big 12 Conference women's basketball tournament =

- Classification: Division I
- Teams: 12
- Site: Cox Convention Center; Oklahoma City, Oklahoma
- Champions: Oklahoma (4th title)
- Winning coach: Sherri Coale (4th title)
- MVP: Courtney Paris (Oklahoma)
- Attendance: 48,990 (overall); 12,413 (championship)
- Television: Cox Cable, FSN

2006–07 Big 12 Conference women's basketball standings
| | Conf. | | | | Overall |
| Team | W | | L | PCT | W | | L | PCT |
|---|---|---|---|---|---|---|---|---|
| No. 16 Texas A&M | 13 | – | 3 | .813 | 25 | – | 7 | .781 |
| No. 9 Oklahoma † | 13 | – | 3 | .813 | 28 | – | 5 | .848 |
| No. 19 Baylor | 11 | – | 5 | .688 | 26 | – | 8 | .765 |
| Nebraska | 10 | – | 6 | .625 | 22 | – | 10 | .688 |
| No. 24 Iowa State | 10 | – | 6 | .625 | 26 | – | 9 | .743 |
| Oklahoma State | 8 | – | 8 | .500 | 20 | – | 11 | .645 |
| Texas | 6 | – | 10 | .375 | 18 | – | 14 | .563 |
| Colorado | 6 | – | 10 | .375 | 13 | – | 17 | .433 |
| Texas Tech | 6 | – | 10 | .375 | 15 | – | 16 | .484 |
| Missouri | 5 | – | 11 | .313 | 17 | – | 14 | .548 |
| Kansas | 4 | – | 12 | .250 | 11 | – | 20 | .355 |
| Kansas State | 4 | – | 12 | .250 | 19 | – | 15 | .559 |
† 2007 Big 12 Tournament winner Rankings from AP poll

The 2007 Big 12 Conference women's basketball championship, known for sponsorship reasons as the 2007 Phillips 66 Big 12 Women's Basketball Championship, was the 2007 edition of the Big 12 Conference's championship tournament. The tournament was held at the Cox Convention Center in Oklahoma City from 6 March until 10 March 2007. The Quarterfinals, Semifinals, and Finals were televised on FSN. The championship game, held on March 10, 2007, featured the Oklahoma Sooners and the Iowa State Cyclones. The Sooners won 67–60.

== Seeding ==
2007 Big 12 Conference women's basketball tournament seeds
| Seed | School | Conf. | Over. | Tiebreaker |
| 1 | Texas A&M ‡# | 13–3 | 25–7 | |
| 2 | Oklahoma c# | 13–3 | 28–5 | |
| 3 | Baylor # | 11–5 | 26–8 | |
| 4 | Nebraska # | 10–6 | 22–10 | |
| 5 | Iowa State | 10–6 | 26–9 | |
| 6 | Oklahoma State | 8–8 | 20–11 | |
| 7 | Texas | 6–10 | 18–14 | |
| 8 | Colorado | 6–10 | 13–17 | |
| 9 | Texas Tech | 6–10 | 15–16 | |
| 10 | Missouri | 5–11 | 17–14 | |
| 11 | Kansas | 4–12 | 11–20 | |
| 12 | Kansas State | 4–12 | 19–15 | |
‡ – Big 12 Conference regular season champions, and tournament No. 1 seed. c – Big 12 Conference regular season co-champion, not tournament No. 1 seed. # – Received a single-bye in the conference tournament. Overall records include all games played in the Big 12 Conference tournament.

== Schedule ==
| Session | Game | Time | Matchup | Television | Attendance |
First Round – Tuesday, March 6
| 1 | 1 | 12:00 pm | #8 Colorado 71 vs #9 Texas Tech 67 | Cox Cable | 4,710 |
| 1 | 2 | 2:30 pm | #5 Iowa State 57 vs #12 Kansas State 45 | Cox Cable | 4,710 |
| 2 | 3 | 6:00 pm | #7 Texas 70 vs #10 Missouri 57 | Cox Cable | 5,768 |
| 2 | 4 | 8:30 pm | #11 Kansas 67 vs #6 Oklahoma State 59 | Cox Cable | 5,768 |
Quarterfinals – Wednesday, March 7
| 3 | 5 | 12:00 pm | #1 Texas A&M 62 vs #8 Colorado 45 | FSN | 5,787 |
| 3 | 6 | 2:30 pm | #5 Iowa State 79 vs #4 Nebraska 76 ^{OT} | FSN | 5,787 |
| 4 | 7 | 6:00 pm | #2 Oklahoma 67 vs #7 Texas 58 | FSN | 10,210 |
| 4 | 8 | 8:30 pm | #3 Baylor 71 vs #11 Kansas 54 | FSN | 10,210 |
Semifinals – Thursday, March 8
| 5 | 9 | 6:00 pm | #5 Iowa State 57 vs #1 Texas A&M 51 | FSN | 10,102 |
| 5 | 10 | 8:30 pm | #2 Oklahoma 78 vs #3 Baylor 64 | FSN | 10,102 |
Final – Saturday, March 10
| 6 | 11 | 6:00 pm | #2 Oklahoma 67 vs #5 Iowa State 60 | FSN | 12,413 |
Game times in CT. #-Rankings denote tournament seed

== Tournament bracket ==
First Round (March 6)
8 | Colorado | 71
9 | Texas Tech | 67
5 | Iowa State | 57
12 | Kansas State | 45
7 | Texas | 70
10 | Missouri | 57
6 | Oklahoma State | 62
11 | Kansas | 71

Second Round (March 7)
1 | Texas A&M | 62
8 | Colorado | 45
4 | Nebraska | 76
5 | Iowa State (OT) | 79
2 | Oklahoma | 67
7 | Texas | 58
3 | Baylor | 71
11 | Kansas | 54

Semifinals (March 8)
1 | Texas A&M | 51
5 | Iowa State | 57
2 | Oklahoma | 78
3 | Baylor | 64

Finals (March 10)
5 | Iowa State | 60
2 | Oklahoma | 67

== See also ==
- 2007 Big 12 Conference men's basketball tournament
- 2007 NCAA Women's Division I Basketball Tournament
- 2006–07 NCAA Division I women's basketball rankings
