= Big 12 basketball tournament =

The phrase Big 12 basketball tournament may refer to:

- Big 12 men's basketball tournament
- Big 12 women's basketball tournament
