= 2006 Big 12 Conference women's basketball tournament =

- Classification: Division I
- Teams: 12
- Site: Reunion Arena; Dallas, Texas
- Champions: Oklahoma (3rd title)
- Winning coach: Sherri Coale (3rd title)
- MVP: Courtney Paris (Oklahoma)
- Attendance: 25,551 (overall); 10,673 (championship)
- Television: FSN

2005–06 Big 12 Conference women's basketball standings
	Conf.				Overall
Team	W		L	PCT	W		L	PCT
No. 7 Oklahoma †	16	–	0	1.000	31	–	5	.861
No. 10 Baylor	12	–	4	.750	26	–	7	.788
No. 20 Texas A&M	11	–	5	.688	23	–	9	.719
Missouri	10	–	6	.625	21	–	10	.677
Texas Tech	9	–	7	.563	15	–	14	.517
Nebraska	8	–	8	.500	19	–	13	.594
Kansas State	8	–	8	.500	24	–	10	.706
Texas	7	–	9	.438	13	–	15	.464
Iowa State	7	–	9	.438	18	–	13	.581
Kansas	5	–	11	.313	17	–	13	.567
Colorado	3	–	13	.188	9	–	21	.300
Oklahoma State	0	–	16	.000	6	–	22	.214
† 2006 Big 12 Tournament winner Rankings from AP poll

The 2006 Big 12 Conference women's basketball championship, known for sponsorship reasons as the 2006 Phillips 66 Big 12 Women's Basketball Championship, was the 2006 edition of the Big 12 Conference's championship tournament. The tournament was held at the Reunion Arena in Dallas from 7 March until 10 March 2006. The Quarterfinals, Semifinals, and Finals were televised on the ESPN family of networks. The championship game, held on March 10, 2006, featured the number 1 seeded Oklahoma Sooners, and the number 2 seeded Baylor Bears. Oklahoma won this contest by a 72-61 score.

== Seeding ==
2006 Big 12 Conference women's basketball tournament seeds
Seed	School	Conf.	Over.	Tiebreaker
1	Oklahoma ‡#	16–0	31–5	
2	Baylor #	12–4	26–7	
3	Texas A&M #	11–5	23–9	
4	Missouri #	10–6	21–10	
5	Texas Tech	9–7	15–14	
6	Nebraska	8–8	19–13	
7	Kansas State	8–8	24–10	
8	Texas	7–9	13–15	
9	Iowa State	7–9	18–13	
10	Kansas	5–11	17–13	
11	Colorado	3–13	9–21	
12	Oklahoma State	0–16	6–22	
‡ – Big 12 Conference regular season champions, and tournament No. 1 seed. # – Received a single-bye in the conference tournament. Overall records include all games played in the Big 12 Conference tournament.

== Schedule ==
Session	Game	Time	Matchup	Television	Attendance
First Round – Tuesday, March 7
1	1	12:00 pm	#9 Iowa State 72 vs #8 Texas 68		1,820
1	2	2:30 pm	#5 Texas Tech 61 vs #12 Oklahoma State 42		1,820
2	3	6:00 pm	#7 Kansas State 72 vs #10 Kansas 52		1,423
2	4	8:30 pm	#6 Nebraska 67 vs #11 Colorado 59		1,423
Quarterfinals – Wednesday, March 8
3	5	12:00 pm	#1 Oklahoma 78 vs #9 Iowa State 74	FSN	4,358
3	6	2:30 pm	#4 Missouri 81 vs #5 Texas Tech 75	FSN	4,358
4	7	6:00 pm	#2 Baylor 79 vs #7 Kansas State 74 ^{OT}	FSN	3,065
4	8	8:30 pm	#3 Texas A&M 73 vs #6 Nebraska 64	FSN	3,065
Semifinals – Thursday, March 9
5	9	6:00 pm	#1 Oklahoma 75 vs #4 Missouri 54	FSN	4,212
5	10	8:30 pm	#2 Baylor 53 vs #3 Texas A&M 52	FSN	4,212
Final – Saturday, March 11
6	11	6:00 pm	#1 Oklahoma 72 vs #2 Baylor 61	FSN	10,673
Game times in CT. #-Rankings denote tournament seed

== Tournament bracket ==
First Round (March 7)
8	Texas	68
9	Iowa State	72
5	Texas Tech	61
12	Oklahoma State	42
7	Kansas State	72
10	Kansas	52
6	Nebraska	67
11	Colorado	59

Quarterfinals (March 8)
1	Oklahoma	78
9	Iowa State	74
4	Missouri	81
5	Texas Tech	75
2	Baylor	79
7	Kansas State (OT)	74
3	Texas A&M	73
6	Nebraska	64

Semifinals (March 9)
1	Oklahoma	78
4	Missouri	54
2	Baylor	53
2	Texas A&M	52

Finals (March 10)
1	Oklahoma	72
2	Baylor	62

== See also ==
- 2006 Big 12 Conference men's basketball tournament
- 2006 NCAA Women's Division I Basketball Tournament
- 2005–06 NCAA Division I women's basketball rankings
