= 2004 Big 12 Conference women's basketball tournament =

- Classification: Division I
- Teams: 12
- Site: Reunion Arena; Dallas, Texas
- Champions: Oklahoma (2nd title)
- Winning coach: Sherri Coale (2nd title)
- MVP: Dionnah Jackson (Oklahoma)
- Attendance: 34,851 (overall); 8,226 (championship)
- Television: FSN

2003–04 Big 12 Conference women's basketball standings
	Conf.				Overall
Team	W		L	PCT	W		L	PCT
No. 4 Texas	14	–	2	.875	30	–	5	.857
No. 8 Kansas State	14	–	2	.875	25	–	6	.806
No. 17 Colorado	11	–	5	.688	22	–	8	.733
No. 14 Texas Tech	10	–	6	.625	25	–	8	.758
No. 15 Baylor	10	–	6	.625	26	–	9	.743
No. 11 Oklahoma †	9	–	7	.563	24	–	9	.727
Missouri	7	–	9	.438	17	–	13	.567
Nebraska	7	–	9	.438	18	–	12	.600
Iowa State	7	–	9	.438	18	–	15	.545
Oklahoma State	3	–	13	.188	8	–	20	.286
Texas A&M	2	–	14	.125	9	–	19	.321
Kansas	2	–	14	.125	9	–	19	.321
† 2004 Big 12 Tournament winner Rankings from AP poll

The 2004 Big 12 women's basketball championship, known for sponsorship reasons as the 2004 Phillips 66 Big 12 Women's Basketball Championship, was the 2004 edition of the Big 12 Conference's championship tournament. The tournament was held at the Reunion Arena in Dallas from 9 March until 13 March 2004. The Quarterfinals, Semifinals, and Finals were televised on the ESPN family of networks. The championship game, held on March 12, 2004, featured the number 1 seeded Texas Longhorns, and the sixth seeded Oklahoma Sooners. Oklahoma won the tournament by posting a 66-47 victory over the Longhorns.

== Seeding ==
2004 Big 12 Conference women's basketball tournament seeds
Seed	School	Conf.	Over.	Tiebreaker
1	Texas ‡#	14–2	30–5	
2	Kansas State c#	14–2	25–6	
3	Colorado #	11–5	22–8	
4	Texas Tech #	10–6	25–8	
5	Baylor	10–6	26–9	
6	Oklahoma	9–7	24–9	
7	Missouri	7–9	17–13	
8	Nebraska	7–9	18–12	
9	Iowa State	7–9	18–15	
10	Oklahoma State	3–13	8–20	
11	Texas A&M	2–14	9–19	
12	Kansas	2–14	9–19	
‡ – Big 12 Conference regular season champions, and tournament No. 1 seed. c – Big 12 Conference regular season co-champion, not tournament No. 1 seed. # – Received a single-bye in the conference tournament. Overall records include all games played in the Big 12 Conference tournament.

== Schedule ==
Session	Game	Time	Matchup	Television	Attendance
First Round – Tuesday, March 9
1	1	12:00 pm	#9 Iowa State 63 vs #8 Nebraska 52		5,739
1	2	2:30 pm	#5 Baylor 86 vs #12 Kansas 71		5,739
2	3	6:00 pm	#7 Missouri 75 vs #10 Oklahoma State 52		2,624
2	4	8:30 pm	#6 Oklahoma 60 vs #11 Texas A&M 47		2,624
Quarterfinals – Wednesday, March 10
3	5	12:00 pm	#1 Texas 64 vs #9 Iowa State 54	FSN	8,771
3	6	2:30 pm	#5 Baylor 80 vs #4 Texas Tech 72	FSN	8,771
4	7	6:00 pm	#2 Kansas State 79 vs #7 Missouri 58	FSN	3,326
4	8	8:30 pm	#6 Oklahoma 63 vs #3 Colorado 56	FSN	3,326
Semifinals – Thursday, March 11
5	9	6:00 pm	#1 Texas 63 vs #5 Baylor 59	FSN	6,165
5	10	8:30 pm	#6 Oklahoma 78 vs #2 Kansas State 66	FSN	6,165
Final – Saturday, March 13
6	11	6:00 pm	#6 Oklahoma 66 vs #1 Texas 47	FSN	8,226
Game times in CT. #-Rankings denote tournament seed

== Tournament bracket ==
First Round (March 9)
8	Nebraska	52
9	Iowa State	63
5	Baylor	86
12	Kansas	71
7	Missouri	75
10	Oklahoma State	52
6	Oklahoma	60
11	Texas A&M	47

Quarterfinals (March 10)
1	Texas	64
9	Iowa State	54
4	Texas Tech	72
5	Baylor	80
2	Kansas State	79
7	Missouri	58
3	Colorado	56
6	Oklahoma	63

Semifinals (March 11)
1	Texas	63
5	Baylor	59
6	Oklahoma	78
2	Kansas State	66

Finals (March 13)
1	Texas	47
6	Oklahoma	66

== All-Tournament Team ==
Most Outstanding Player – Dionnah Jackson, Oklahoma

Player	Team
Dionnah Jackson	Oklahoma
Sophia Young	Baylor
Tiffany Jackson	Texas
Caton Hill	Oklahoma
Maria Villarroel	Oklahoma

== See also ==
- 2004 Big 12 Conference men's basketball tournament
- 2004 NCAA Women's Division I Basketball Tournament
- 2003–04 NCAA Division I women's basketball rankings
