= Courtney Paris =

American basketball player and coach (born 1987)

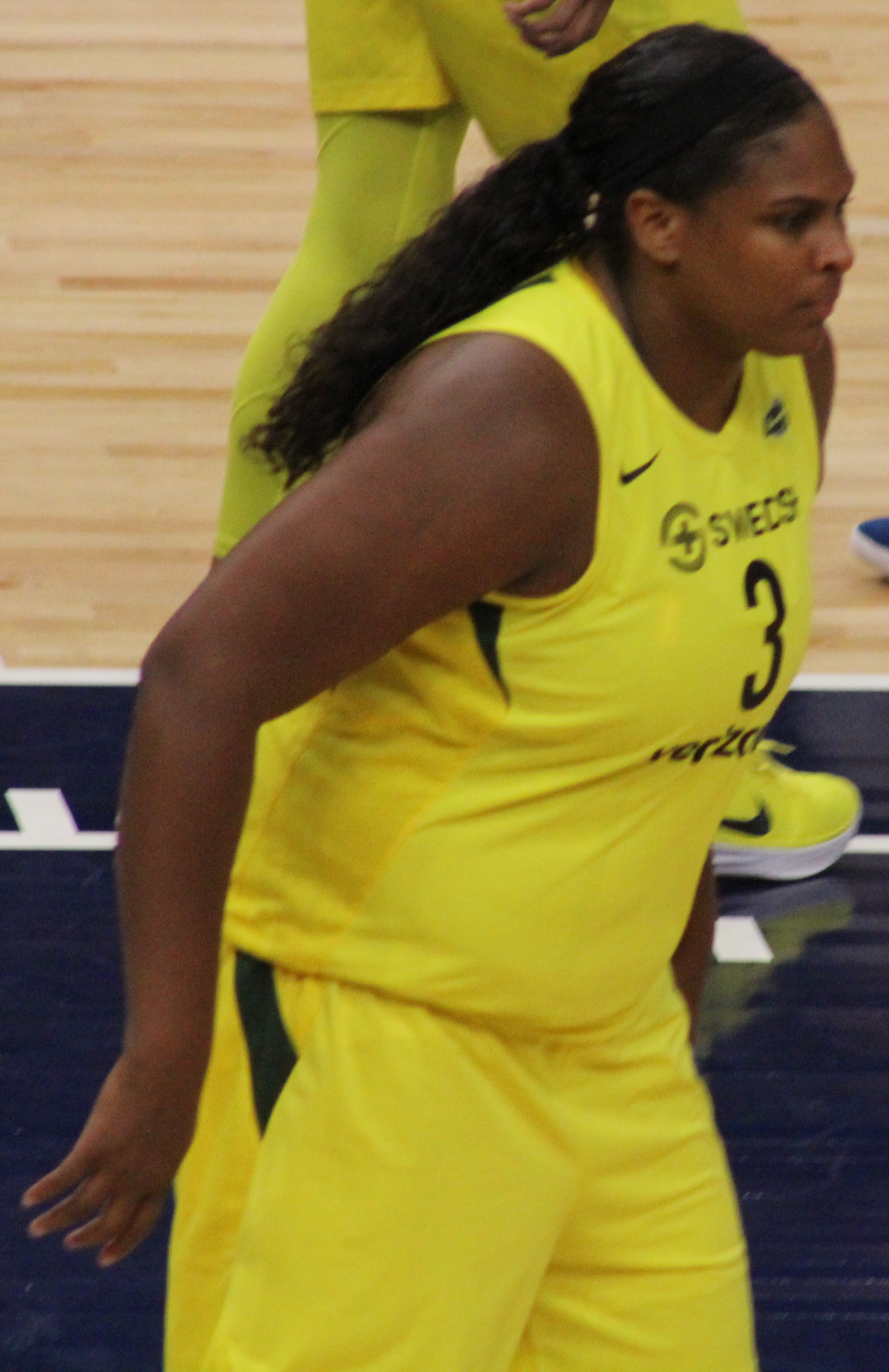
- Paris in 2018

New York Liberty
- Title: Assistant coach
- League: WNBA

Personal information
- Born: September 21, 1987 (age 39) San Jose, California, U.S.
- Listed height: 6 ft 4 in (1.93 m)
- Listed weight: 250 lb (113 kg)

Career information
- High school: Piedmont (Piedmont, California)
- College: Oklahoma (2005–2009)
- WNBA draft: 2009: 1st round, 7th overall pick
- Drafted by: Sacramento Monarchs
- Playing career: 2009–2020
- Position: Center
- Coaching career: 2020–present

Career history

Playing
- 2009: Sacramento Monarchs
- 2009–2010: Maccabi Bnot Ashdod
- 2010–2011: Rivas Ecopolis
- 2011–2012: Atlanta Dream
- 2012–2017: Tulsa Shock / Dallas Wings
- 2012–2013: Adana ASKİ SK
- 2013–2014: Mersin BB
- 2015–2017: Hatay BB
- 2018–2019: Seattle Storm

Coaching
- 2020–2021: Oklahoma (assistant)
- 2023–2024: Dallas Wings (assistant)
- 2025: Chicago Sky (assistant)
- 2026–present: New York Liberty (assistant)

Career highlights
- WNBA champion (2018); WNBA Commissioner's Cup Champion (2026); 2× WNBA rebounding champion (2014, 2015); 2× WNBA Peak Performer (2014, 2015); Senior CLASS Award (2009); AP Player of the Year (2007); 4× First-team All-American – AP (2006–2009); 4× All-American – Kodak/State Farm Coaches', USBWA(2006–2009); 3× Big 12 Player of the Year (2007–2009); 3× Big 12 Defensive Player of the Year (2006–2008); 2× Big 12 Tournament Most Outstanding Player (2006, 2007); 4× First-team All-Big 12 (2006–2009); 4× Big 12 All-Defensive Team (2006–2009); USBWA National Freshman of the Year (2006); Big 12 Freshman of the Year (2006); Big 12 All-Freshman Team (2006); 2× NCAA season rebounding leader (2006, 2008); Naismith Prep Player of the Year (2005); McDonald's All-American Game MVP (2005)
- Stats at WNBA.com
- Stats at Basketball Reference
Medals
Women's basketball
Representing the United States
FIBA Under-19 World Cup
Gold medal – first place	2005 Tunisia	Team
FIBA Under-18 Americas Championship
Gold medal – first place	2004 Puerto Rico	Team

Courtney Paris (born September 21, 1987) is an American professional basketball coach and former player who is currently an assistant coach for the New York Liberty of the Women's National Basketball Association (WNBA). She is best known for her accomplishments during her college career at the University of Oklahoma, where she holds career averages of 21.4 points and 15.3 rebounds per game. She holds the NCAA record for most consecutive double-doubles at 112. During her senior season in 2009, Paris received considerable media attention when she announced that she would pay back her tuition to the University of Oklahoma if the Sooners did not win the 2009 NCAA Women's Division I Basketball Tournament. She would lead Oklahoma to the Final Four before falling short to eventual national runner-up Louisville.

Paris was selected seventh overall by the now-defunct Sacramento Monarchs in the 2009 WNBA draft. Over 10 seasons in the league, she played for the Monarchs, Atlanta Dream, Tulsa Shock (later the Dallas Wings), and Seattle Storm.

== Early life ==
Paris was born in San Jose, California.

Paris' twin sister Ashley Paris is also a basketball player. In addition to being a twin, Paris has four brothers: Wayne, David, Austin and Brandon. She has two half-brothers (Bubba's sons) William III and Christian. Her parents are Lynne Gray and former NFL player William "Bubba" Paris.

Paris transferred from Modesto Christian High School to Piedmont High School in Piedmont, California, at the start of the 2002–2003 year. Paris was named a WBCA All-American. She participated in the 2005 WBCA High School All-America Game, where she scored three points. Paris chose Oklahoma over UConn, California, Texas, UCLA, and Syracuse.

== College career ==
Paris is the only player in NCAA history, male or female, to have 700 points, 500 rebounds, and 100 blocks in a season. In 2005–06, Paris set the women's NCAA record for rebounds in a single season, with 539. She holds the NCAA record for most consecutive double-doubles at 112 games, a streak which ended on February 2, 2009, against Pat Summitt and the Tennessee Lady Volunteers; however, Oklahoma won the game, denying Summitt her 1000th career victory. On February 8, 2009, Paris broke the record for most career NCAA Division I rebounds, formerly held by Wanda Ford of Drake. In the Sooners' victory in the semifinals of the Oklahoma City Regional in the 2009 NCAA Tournament against Pitt on March 29, she became the first player in U.S. college basketball history—regardless of sex, governing body, or division—with 2,500 points and 2,000 rebounds in her career.

Paris also became the first freshman named to the Associated Press All-American team in 2006, and again made the team in 2007. In April 2007, Paris was named the 2007 Associated Press Women's basketball player of the year. She is the first sophomore ever to win the AP Player of the year award. She won All-American honors again her junior year, and as a senior she became the first four-time first-team All-American in women's basketball history. She also won the Lowe's Senior CLASS Award, recognizing her as the nation's top senior women's basketball player.

At Oklahoma, Paris majored in journalism.

Paris had announced that if Oklahoma did not win the NCAA championship in 2009, her final year, she would repay her scholarship — worth about $64,000 in out-of-state tuition — to the university. She said that without a championship, "I don’t feel like I’ve earned it.”

On Sunday April 5, 2009, Oklahoma lost to the Louisville Cardinals 61–59. In a post-game interview with ESPN, Paris was asked if she would make do on her promise to repay her $64,000 basketball scholarship. She replied that she would but that it would take her some time. A week later, the university said that she did not have to repay her scholarship.

== Professional career ==
Paris was selected by the Sacramento Monarchs at No. 7 pick in the 2009 WNBA draft and her sister was drafted to the Los Angeles Sparks.

On December 14, 2009, the WNBA held a dispersal draft for the Monarchs' players. Paris was taken with the fourth pick by the Chicago Sky. On May 12, 2010, Paris was waived by the Sky.

On February 8, 2011, she signed a free agent contract with the Los Angeles Sparks and on June 2, she was waived.

Paris signed with the Tulsa Shock in 2012. She led the WNBA in rebounding averaging 10.2 per game in 2014 and 9.3 per game in 2015.

On February 2, 2018, Paris signed a multi-year contract with the Seattle Storm.

== National team career ==
Paris was a member of the USA Women's U18 team which won the gold medal at the FIBA Americas Championship in Mayaguez, Puerto Rico. The event was held in August 2004, when the USA team defeated Puerto Rico to win the championship. Paris was the second leading scorer for the team, averaging 15.8 points per game.

Paris continued with the team as it became the U19 team, and competed in the 2005 U19 World Championships in Tunis, Tunisia. The USA team won all eight games, winning the gold medal. Paris was the third leading scorer for the team, averaging 12.1 points per game and tied for the lead in rebounding with 7.0 rebounds per game.

== Coaching career ==
In May 2020, Paris returned to her alma mater, the University of Oklahoma, as an assistant coach for the women’s basketball team under head coach Sherri Coale.

In January 2023, Paris joined the coaching staff of the Dallas Wings in the WNBA, serving as an assistant coach under head coach Latricia Trammell.

In December 2024, Paris joined the coaching staff of the Chicago Sky, serving as an assistant coach under head coach Tyler Marsh. She left the team after the 2025 season.

== Career statistics ==
Legend
GP	Games played	GS	Games started	MPG	Minutes per game	RPG	Rebounds per game
APG	Assists per game	SPG	Steals per game	BPG	Blocks per game	PPG	Points per game
TO	Turnovers per game	FG%	Field-goal percentage	3P%	3-point field-goal percentage	FT%	Free-throw percentage
**Bold**	Career best	°	League leader

=== WNBA ===
==== Regular season ====
Year	Team	GP	GS	MPG	FG%	3P%	FT%	RPG	APG	SPG	BPG	TO	PPG
2009	Sacramento	33	6	13.4	51.5	0.0	**72.7**	4.1	0.7	0.3	0.3	0.6	4.8
2010	Did not play (waived)												
2011	Atlanta	28	0	9.6	51.9	0.0	51.6	3.1	0.4	0.3	0.4	**0.3**	3.4
2012	Atlanta	4	0	7.3	50.0	0.0	0.0	2.0	0.0	0.5	0.5	**0.3**	1.5
2012	Tulsa	23	0	9.8	54.5	0.0	39.1	3.3	0.5	0.3	0.4	0.6	3.5
2013	Tulsa	23	2	12.0	46.1	0.0	66.7	4.1	0.5	0.3	0.7	0.5	3.8
2014	Tulsa	**34**	**34**	**27.6**	**57.4**	0.0	49.3	**10.2**	1.1	**0.8**	1.1	1.1	**9.2**
2015	Tulsa	**34**	**34**	25.0	48.6	0.0	42.5	9.3	**1.3**	0.4	**1.2**	1.0	6.6
2016	Dallas	**34**	32	24.3	54.8	0.0	55.6	8.0	1.1	0.4	0.9	0.8	7.7
2017	Dallas	20	8	13.7	55.9	0.0	50.0	3.7	0.7	0.4	0.6	1.0	4.2
2018	Seattle	**34**	0	10.6	53.3	0.0	52.9	3.9	0.6	0.2	0.3	0.4	2.1
2019	Seattle	30	0	6.3	40.0	0.0	42.9	1.7	0.4	0.3	0.1	**0.3**	0.5
Career	10 years, 4 teams	297	116	15.8	52.8	0.0	51.4	5.4	0.7	0.4	0.6	0.7	4.7

==== Playoffs ====
Year	Team	GP	GS	MPG	FG%	3P%	FT%	RPG	APG	SPG	BPG	TO	PPG
2011	Atlanta	**5**	0	3.6	50.0	0.0	50.0	1.0	0.0	0.4	0.2	0.4	0.6
2015	Tulsa	2	**2**	**21.0**	45.5	0.0	25.0	**7.5**	**1.0**	**1.0**	0.0	1.5	5.5
2017	Dallas	1	0	16.0	80.0	0.0	**100.0**	6.0	**1.0**	0.0	**2.0**	**0.0**	**9.0**
2018	Seattle	4	0	3.8	0.0	0.0	0.0	2.0	0.5	0.0	0.0	**0.0**	0.0
2019	Seattle	2	0	4.5	**100.0**	0.0	0.0	0.5	1.0	0.0	0.0	0.5	1.0
Career	5 years, 3 teams	14	2	7.1	50.0	0.0	42.9	2.5	0.5	0.3	0.2	0.4	1.8

=== College ===
Legend
GP	Games played	GS	Games started	MPG	Minutes per game	FG%	Field goal percentage	3P%	3-point field goal percentage
FT%	Free throw percentage	RPG	Rebounds per game	APG	Assists per game	SPG	Steals per game	BPG	Blocks per game
TO	Turnovers per game	PPG	Points per game	**Bold**	Career high	*	Led Division I

Year	Team	GP	Points	FG%	3P%	FT%	RPG	APG	SPG	BPG	PPG
2005–06	Oklahoma	36	**788**	**61.4**	.000	48.1	*15.0	1.7	**1.1**	3.3	21.9
2006–07	Oklahoma	33	775	57.0	.000	57.4	**15.9**	1.7	1.0	3.4	**23.5**°
2007–08	Oklahoma	31	578	56.1	.000	57.1	*15.0	1.5	0.9	**3.5**	18.6
2008–09	Oklahoma	**37**	588	56.5	.000	**57.7**	13.6	1.5	0.9	2.9	15.9
Career		137	2,729	57.9	.000	54.7	14.8	1.6	1.0	3.3	19.9

== See also ==
- List of NCAA Division I women's basketball players with 2,500 points and 1,000 rebounds
