= Ashley Paris =

American basketball player (born 1987)

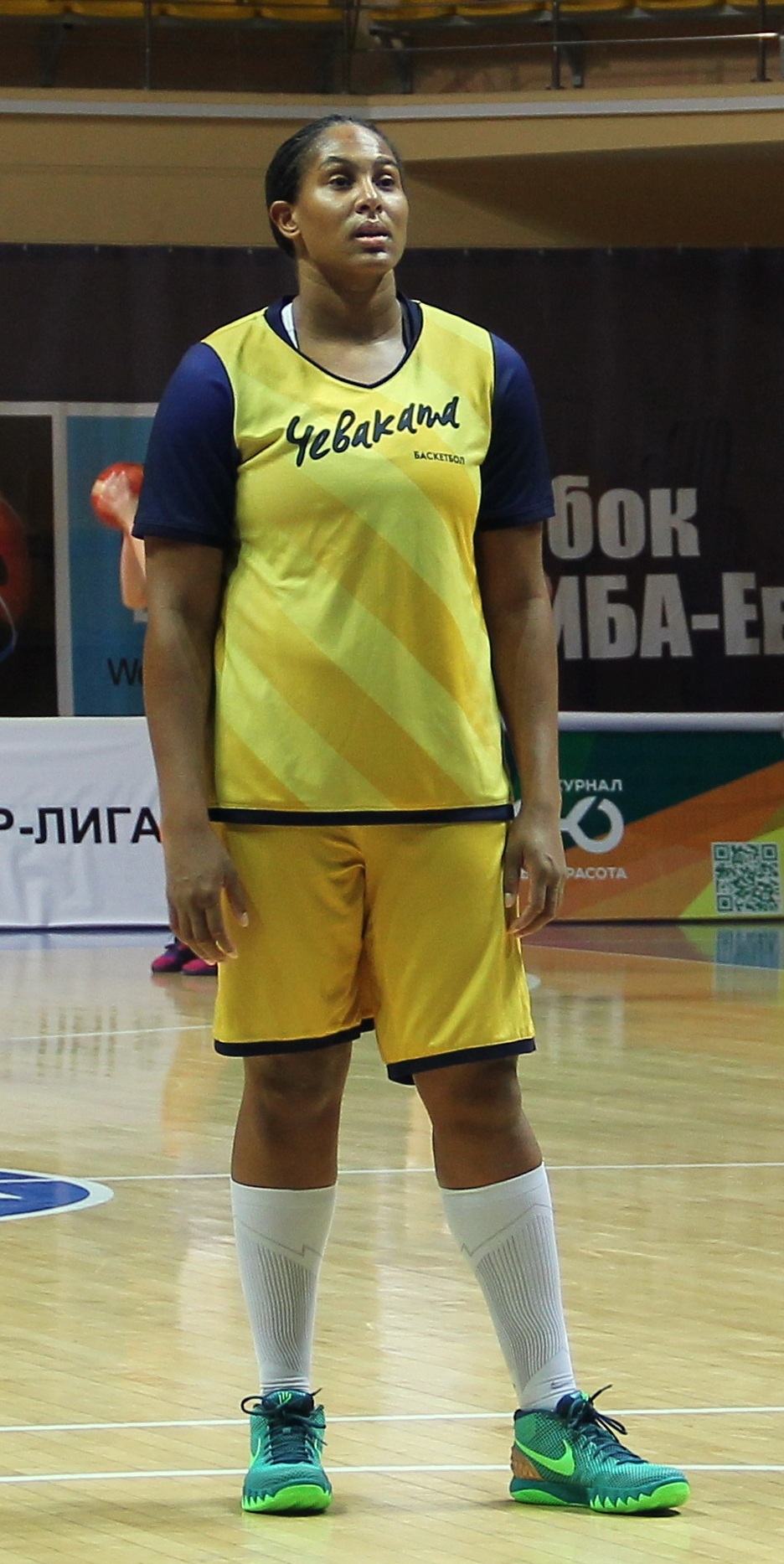

Personal information
- Born: September 21, 1987 (age 39) San Jose, California, U.S.
- Listed height: 6 ft 3 in (1.91 m)

Career information
- High school: Piedmont (Piedmont, California)
- College: Oklahoma (2005–2009)
- WNBA draft: 2009: 2nd round, 22nd overall pick
- Drafted by: Los Angeles Sparks
- Position: Forward

Career highlights
- First-team All-Big 12 (2009); McDonald's All-American (2005)
- Stats at Basketball Reference

Ashley Paris (born September 21, 1987) is an American basketball player. She is the twin sister of former WNBA center Courtney Paris, who last played for the Seattle Storm and is currently an assistant coach for the Dallas Wings. She has been nationally recognized for her basketball achievements at the University of Oklahoma. She was selected on April 9, 2009 with 22nd overall pick in the 2009 WNBA draft by the Los Angeles Sparks.

== High school ==
Paris played for Modesto Christian High School in Modesto, California and then transferred to Piedmont High School in Piedmont, California, where she was named a WBCA All-American. She participated in the 2005 WBCA High School All-America Game, where she scored eight points.

== College ==
On May 21, 2006, she was named a 2006 USA U20 National Team finalist. She chose the University of Oklahoma over such schools as Texas, UConn, Cal and Syracuse. Ashley and twin sister Courtney helped the Sooners go undefeated in the Big 12 during the 2005–2006 season, in which they went on to win the Big 12 Championship. In 2007 Ashley became a starter on the University of Oklahoma Women’s Basketball team along with sister Courtney. That year she received Big 12 Honorable Mention as well as making the All-Big 12 Academic First Team. She was a communications major and graduated in Spring 2009.

== Oklahoma statistics ==
Legend
GP	Games played	GS	Games started	MPG	Minutes per game
FG%	Field goal percentage	3P%	3-point field goal percentage	FT%	Free throw percentage
RPG	Rebounds per game	APG	Assists per game	SPG	Steals per game
BPG	Blocks per game	PPG	Points per game	**Bold**	Career high

Year	Team	GP	Points	FG%	3P%	FT%	RPG	APG	SPG	BPG	PPG
2005–06	Oklahoma	36	212	47.2	–	49.0	6.7	1.0	0.4	0.6	5.9
2006–07	Oklahoma	33	245	47.7	–	**63.8**	6.8	1.5	0.4	**1.0**	7.4
2007–08	Oklahoma	31	350	53.8	14.3	59.1	7.9	**1.7**	0.6	0.9	11.3
2008–09	Oklahoma	**37**	**466**	**52.1**	**20.0**	62.4	**9.6**	1.6	**0.8**	0.9	**12.6**
Career	Oklahoma	137	1273	50.8	14.3	59.7	7.8	1.5	0.5	0.8	9.3

=== WNBA ===
Paris was drafted in the WNBA draft with the 22nd overall pick in the second round, 14 spots after her twin sister Courtney Paris. Paris was drafted by the Los Angeles Sparks. The Sparks announced that they decided to waive Paris on June 4, one day before the 11-man roster deadline on June 5. Although she was waived by the Sparks, she did manage to play in a preseason game. She wore the number 54 at the forward position. She scored 1 point which came at the free throw line. She played eight minutes for the Sparks in her only WNBA "game". In March 2010 she was signed to a training camp contract by the Phoenix Mercury, and in March 2011 to a similar contract by the Atlanta Dream. On March 2, 2015 Paris signed a training camp contract by the San Antonio Stars.

== Personal life ==
She is the twin sister of fellow WNBA player Courtney Paris. The twins are the daughters of Lynne Gray and former NFL player William "Bubba" Paris. She also has four brothers named Wayne, David, Austin, and Brandon and two half-brothers (Bubba's sons) William III and Christian.
