= Alicia Thompson =

American basketball player (born 1976)

Personal information
- Born: July 30, 1976 (age 50) Big Lake, Texas, U.S.
- Listed height: 6 ft 1 in (1.85 m)
- Listed weight: 180 lb (82 kg)

Career information
- High school: Reagan County (Big Lake, Texas)
- College: Texas Tech (1994–1998)
- WNBA draft: 1998: 1st round, 9th overall pick
- Drafted by: New York Liberty
- Playing career: 1999–2005
- Position: Forward
- Number: 43

Career history
- 1998: New York Liberty
- 2000–2002: Indiana Fever
- 2004–2005: Seattle Storm

Career highlights
- WNBA champion (2004); Kodak All-American (1998); All-American – USBWA (1998); First-team All-American – AP (1998); Big 12 Player of the Year (1998); Big 12 Tournament Most Outstanding Player (1998); 2× First-team All-Big 12 (1997, 1998)
- Stats at WNBA.com
- Stats at Basketball Reference
Medals
Women;s basketball
Representing United States
Jones Cup
Silver medal – second place	1997 Taipei	Team competition

Alicia Rachelle Thompson (born July 30, 1976) is an American former WNBA basketball player for the Seattle Storm. She was raised in Big Lake, Texas and attended high school at Reagan County High School where she excelled in basketball, shot put and discus throw. She was recruited by Texas Tech while still in high school and became Tech's 2nd all-time leading rebounder and scorer, scoring 2,156 points throughout her college career. Also excelling in track and proficiency in the discus throw, Thompson was voted Kodak All-American in her senior year and went on to be voted as the Big Twelve Player of the Year. Thompson honed her basketball skills as a Lady Raider and was drafted by New York Liberty in the 1st round, as 9th overall pick. Her determination and tenacity propelled her to achieve an outstanding career in basketball. During her six-year career in the WNBA, she also played for the Indiana Fever and the Seattle Storm. While starting for the Indiana Fever, Thompson scored a single game high of 22 points and collecting 15 rebounds. During her time playing for the Seattle Storm Thompson had the best season of her career, averaging 10.0 points, 5.1 rebounds and shooting 51.4% from the field, Thompson ranks in the WNBA's top five. While playing for the Seattle Storm in 2004, the team defeated the Connecticut Sun winning them the first Championship in 25 years highlighting her career as a professional basketball player. Since retiring from the WNBA Thompson has played professional basketball in Spain, Italy, Israel, and Turkey.

Thompson was inducted into the Texas Tech Athletics Hall of Fame on November 1, 2008.

== Career statistics ==
Legend
GP	Games played	GS	Games started	MPG	Minutes per game	RPG	Rebounds per game
APG	Assists per game	SPG	Steals per game	BPG	Blocks per game	PPG	Points per game
TO	Turnovers per game	FG%	Field-goal percentage	3P%	3-point field-goal percentage	FT%	Free-throw percentage
**Bold**	Career best	°	League leader

=== WNBA career statistics ===
==== Regular season ====
Year	Team	GP	GS	MPG	FG%	3P%	FT%	RPG	APG	SPG	BPG	TO	PPG
1998	New York	19	0	6.6	23.1	**100.0**	63.2	1.3	0.2	0.1	0.1	0.4	1.6
2000	Indiana	**31**	**26**	**25.5**	**51.4**	45.0	71.4	**5.1**	**1.3**	**0.8**	0.1	1.7	**10.0**
2001	Indiana	22	7	17.3	43.7	39.5	73.9	2.9	1.1	0.4	**0.3**	1.0	8.5
2002	Indiana	18	2	17.4	35.8	24.1	70.6	2.3	0.8	0.4	0.1	1.0	5.4
2004	Seattle	23	2	7.9	44.4	18.8	50.0	1.0	0.4	0.3	0.0	**0.3**	2.3
2005	Seattle	30	1	11.0	39.5	31.8	**75.0**	1.5	0.5	0.1	0.1	0.6	2.8
Career	6 years, 3 teams	143	38	14.9	43.7	35.1	70.6	2.5	0.7	0.4	0.1	0.9	5.3

==== Playoffs ====
Year	Team	GP	GS	MPG	FG%	3P%	FT%	RPG	APG	SPG	BPG	TO	PPG
2002	Indiana	1	0	2.0	**100.0**	0.0	0.0	0.0	0.0	0.0	0.0	0.0	2.0
2004	Seattle	**8**	0	**10.4**	45.5	**50.0**	**100.0**	1.9	**0.8**	**0.3**	**0.1**	0.9	**4.9**
2005	Seattle	1	0	10.0	25.0	0.0	0.0	**3.0**	0.0	0.0	0.0	0.0	2.0
Career	3 years, 2 teams	10	0	9.5	44.7	46.2	100.0	1.8	0.6	0.2	0.1	0.7	4.3

=== College ===
Year	Team	GP	GS	MPG	FG%	3P%	FT%	RPG	APG	SPG	BPG	TO	PPG
1994–95	Texas Tech	**35**	-	-	**55.5**	0.0	56.6	3.0	0.4	0.3	0.1	-	5.6
1995–96	Texas Tech	32	-	-	**46.9**	**35.7**	64.3	9.2	**2.4**	0.8	**0.6**	-	17.4
1996–97	Texas Tech	29	-	-	48.4	34.9	**70.1**	**9.6**	1.4	**1.6**	0.4	-	**23.7**°
1997–98	Texas Tech	31	-	-	54.3	16.7	69.6	8.9	2.0	1.4	0.5	-	23.2°
**Career**		127	-	-	50.4	29.6	66.8	7.5	1.5	1.0	0.4	-	17.0
Statistics retrieved from Sports-Reference.

Career Highlights

- Ranked in WNBA's top five, shooting 51.4% from field in 2000
- WNBA Championship win with the Seattle Storm defeating the Connecticut Sun 2004
- Averaged career-highs of 10.0 ppg and 5.1 rpg in 2000
- Scored career-high 22 points and grabbed career-high 15 rebounds vs. ORL on 6/3/00
- Finished her collegiate career with 2,156 points, which ranked second on Texas Tech's all-time scoring list behind Carolyn Thompson

See more at: https://web.archive.org/web/20150109123357/http://www.wnba.com/playerfile/alicia_thompson/index.html?nav=page

== USA Basketball ==
Thompson competed with USA Basketball as a member of the 1997 Jones Cup Team that won the silver medal in Taipei. Several of the games were close, with the USA team winning four games by six points or fewer, including an overtime game in the semifinal match against Japan. The gold medal game against South Korea was also close, but the USA fell 76–71 to claim the silver medal for the event. Thompson averaged 3.5 points per game.

Alicia Thompson had her best success with Storm Coach Anne Donovan. While playing for Donovan in Indiana in 2000, Thompson had the best season of her career, averaging 10.0 points and 5.1 rebounds and shooting 51.4% from the field to rank in the WNBA's top five. Thompson spent three seasons in Indiana and one in New York before joining the Storm for 2004. She averaged 2.3 points and 1.0 rebounds during the regular season, but boosted those averages to 4.9 points and 1.9 rebounds in the playoffs and hit several key three-pointers. After averaging 2.8 points per game in 2005, Thompson announced her retirement on Sep. 8, 2005. She has continued to work with the Storm as an ambassador for the Stormin' the Sound off-season community program.
