= Sherri Coale =

American basketball coach (born 1965)

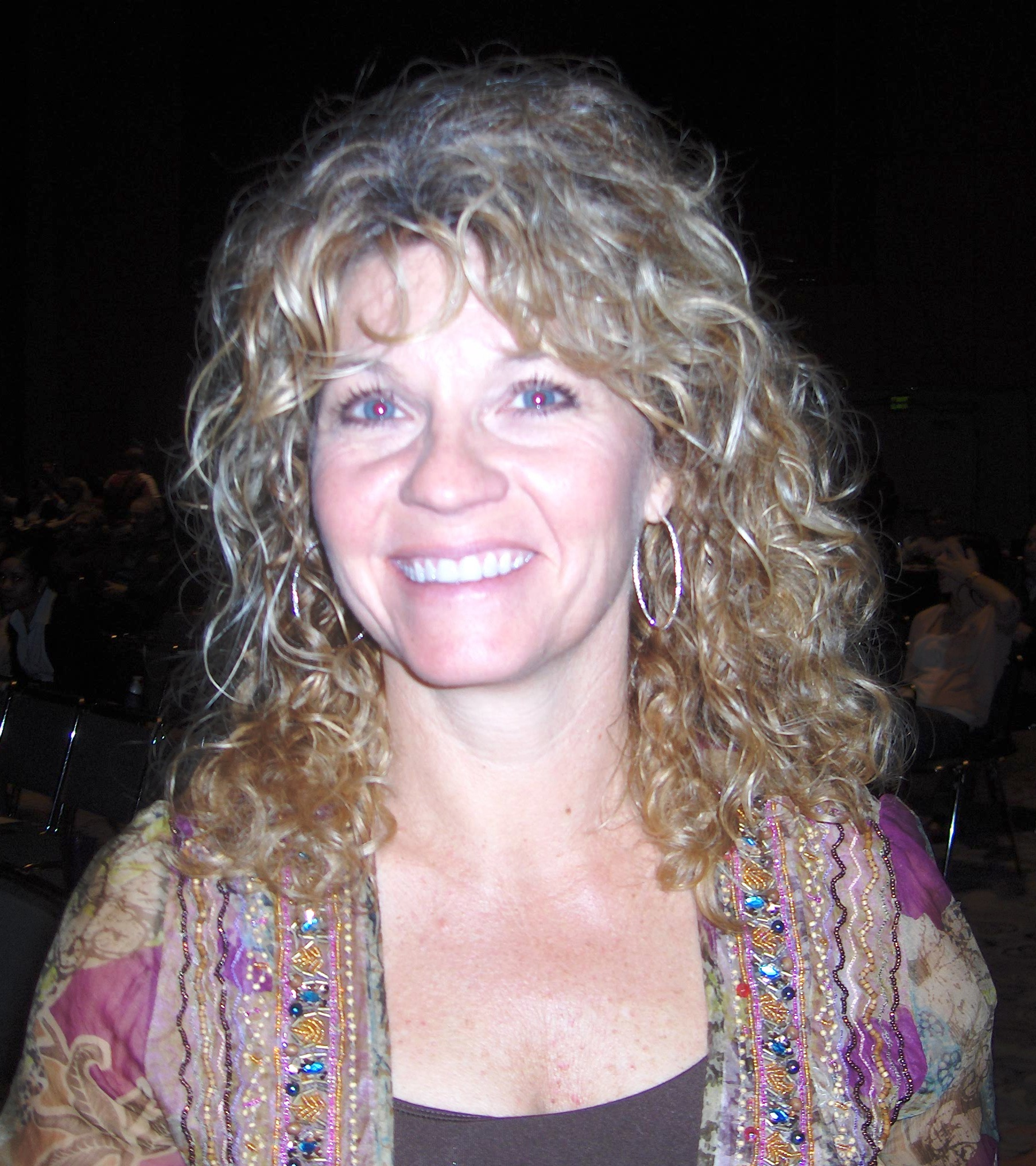

Biographical details
- Born: January 19, 1965 (age 61); Healdton, Oklahoma, U.S.

Playing career
- 1983–1987: Oklahoma Christian

Coaching career (HC unless noted)
- 1990–1996: Norman HS
- 1996–2021: Oklahoma

Head coaching record
- Overall: 513–294 (.636)

Accomplishments and honors

Championships
- 3× NCAA Regional—Final Four (2002, 2009, 2010); 6× Big 12 regular season championships (2000–2002, 2006, 2007, 2009); 4× Big 12 Tournament championships (2002, 2004, 2006, 2007)

Awards
- Oklahoma Women's Hall of Fame
- Women's Basketball Hall of Fame
Medal record
Women's basketball
Assistant coach for United States
FIBA Under-19 World Championship
Bronze medal – third place	2001 Brno	Team competition
Head coach for United States
World University Games
Gold medal – first place	2013 Kazan	Team competition

Sherri Kay Coale (née Buben; Born on January 19, 1965) is an American retired college basketball coach. She was the head coach of the University of Oklahoma Sooners women's basketball team for 25 years, from 1996 to 2021. Coale was inducted into the Women's Basketball Hall of Fame in 2016.

== Personal ==
Coale grew up in Healdton, Oklahoma and married Dane Scott Coale (born 1964) on June 20, 1987. The couple has two children, son Colton (born 1992) and daughter Chandler (born 1996). Coale has one brother, Jack. Their parents are Beverly Stash and Joe Buben.

Coale completed her undergraduate studies at Oklahoma Christian College in Oklahoma City, where she graduated summa cum laude in 1987. She played on the school's Lady Eagles basketball team as a guard.

Coale was inducted into the Oklahoma Women's Hall of Fame in 2007.

Coale is also a columnist for The Purcell Register.

== Coaching career ==
Coale accepted the Oklahoma position in 1996. She went directly from a high school squad (having coached the previous six years at the local Norman High School) to an NCAA Division I team. Inheriting a team in turmoil at Oklahoma, within four years, Coale had the Sooners back in the NCAA Tournament. She brought the Sooners into the national spotlight in 2002 when her team went all the way to the national championship game, losing to undefeated Connecticut.

In 2005–2006, Coale's Sooners went 16–0 in Big 12 play and became the second Big 12 basketball team, men's or women's, to go undefeated in conference play. The University of Kansas men's basketball team went undefeated in Big 12 play in the 2001–2002 season. In 2009 and 2010, Coale led the Sooners back to the NCAA Tournament Final Four in back-to-back seasons, losing tight games to Louisville and Stanford in the semifinals.

Coale announced her retirement at the conclusion of the 2020–21 season.

== USA Basketball ==
Coale was named as assistant coach of the USA team which would compete at the Junior World Championship in Brno, Czech Republic during July 2001. The team won their first five games, including a record setting win against Mali. The 97–27 final score represented the largest margin of victory by a USA team in Junior World Championship history. The preliminary round results qualified the team for the medal rounds, where they faced the host team, the Czech Republic. With a home crowd cheering them on, the Czech team held a nine-point lead with just over six minutes to go. The USA team cut the lead down to three points with seconds to go, and good defense gave the ball back to the USA. However, the USA was called for an offensive foul, and lost possession. The Czech Republic team won 92–88, and went on to beat Russia 82–80 to win the gold medal. The USA team beat Australia 77–72 to win the bronze medal. Diana Taurasi was the leading scorer for the US with 19.3 points per game, while Alana Beard was close behind with 18.0 points per game. Nicole Powell was the leading rebounder for the US, with seven rebounds per game.

== Head coaching record ==
Record table
Season	Team	Overall	Conference	Standing	Postseason
Oklahoma Sooners (Big 12 Conference) (1996–2021)
1996–97	Oklahoma	5–22	1–15	12th	
1997–98	Oklahoma	8–19	2–12	T–9th	
1998–99	Oklahoma	15–14	8–8	T–5th	WNIT Second Round
1999–2000	Oklahoma	25–8	13–3	T–1st	NCAA Sweet 16
2000–01	Oklahoma	28–6	15–1	1st	NCAA Sweet 16
2001–02	Oklahoma	32–4	14–2	1st	NCAA Runner-Up
2002–03	Oklahoma	19–13	9–7	T–5th	NCAA first round
2003–04	Oklahoma	24–9	9–7	6th	NCAA second round
2004–05	Oklahoma	17–13	8–8	T–6th	NCAA first round
2005–06	Oklahoma	31–5	16–0	1st	NCAA Sweet 16
2006–07	Oklahoma	28–5	13–3	T–1st	NCAA Sweet 16
2007–08	Oklahoma	22–9	11–5	T–3rd	NCAA second round
2008–09	Oklahoma	32–5	15–1	1st	NCAA Final Four
2009–10	Oklahoma	27–11	11–5	T–2nd	NCAA Final Four
2010–11	Oklahoma	23–12	10–6	3rd	NCAA Sweet 16
2011–12	Oklahoma	21–13	11–7	T–2nd	NCAA second round
2012–13	Oklahoma	24–11	11–8	T–3rd	NCAA Sweet 16
2013–14	Oklahoma	18–15	9–9	T–5th	NCAA first round
2014–15	Oklahoma	21–12	13–5	2nd	NCAA second round
2015–16	Oklahoma	22–11	11–7	T–4th	NCAA second round
2016–17	Oklahoma	23–10	13–5	3rd	NCAA second round
2017–18	Oklahoma	16–15	11–7	T–3rd	NCAA first round
2018–19	Oklahoma	8–22	4–14	T-8th	
2019–20	Oklahoma	12–18	5–13	9th	
2020–21	Oklahoma	12–12	9–9	6th	
Oklahoma:		513–294 (.636)	250–154 (.619)		
Total:		513–294 (.636)			
National champion Postseason invitational champion Conference regular season champion Conference regular season and conference tournament champion Division regular season champion Division regular season and conference tournament champion Conference tournament champion
