= Angie Braziel =

American basketball player (born 1976)

Personal information
- Born: September 18, 1976 (age 50) Odessa, Texas, U.S.
- Listed height: 6 ft 2 in (1.88 m)

Career information
- High school: Permian (Odessa, Texas)
- College: South Plains College; Texas Tech
- WNBA draft: 1999: 4th round, 45th overall pick
- Drafted by: Charlotte Sting
- Position: Forward

Career highlights
- All-American – USBWA (1999); Second-team All-American – AP (1999); Big 12 Player of the Year (1999); Big 12 Tournament Most Outstanding Player (1999); First-team All-Big 12 (1999)
- Stats at Basketball Reference
Medals
Women's basketball
Representing United States
Jones Cup
Gold medal – first place	1998 Taipei, Taiwan	Team competition

Angie Braziel (born September 18, 1976) is an American former Women's National Basketball Association (WNBA) player who played two seasons with the Charlotte Sting and one with the Indiana Fever from 1999 to 2001. Her career began at Texas Tech, where she scored 1,131 points in three seasons. After several injuries and at one point three operations in the span of a year, Braziel retired and returned to west Texas to coach girls' basketball in public schools.

== USA Basketball ==
Braziel was named to the team representing the US at the 1998 William Jones Cup competition in Taipei, Taiwan. Braziel was the leading scorer, with 14 points, in the 67–40 win over Thailand, which sent the team to the gold medal game. She averaged 5.4 points per game over the five games.

== Career statistics ==
=== WNBA ===
Legend
GP	Games played	GS	Games started	MPG	Minutes per game	RPG	Rebounds per game
APG	Assists per game	SPG	Steals per game	BPG	Blocks per game	PPG	Points per game
TO	Turnovers per game	FG%	Field-goal percentage	3P%	3-point field-goal percentage	FT%	Free-throw percentage
**Bold**	Career best	°	League leader

==== Regular season ====
Year	Team	GP	GS	MPG	FG%	3P%	FT%	RPG	APG	SPG	BPG	TO	PPG
1999	Charlotte	7	0	5.9	**50.0**	0.0	**83.3**	1.6	**0.4**	0.3	0.0	**0.3**	3.4
2000	Charlotte	22	3	9.2	38.8	0.0	68.4	1.5	0.2	0.2	0.0	0.8	2.3
2001	Indiana	**23**	0	**14.8**	43.5	0.0	77.1	**3.3**	0.3	**0.4**	**0.6**	0.9	**5.5**
Career	3 years, 2 teams	52	3	11.3	42.7	0.0	75.8	2.3	0.3	0.3	0.3	0.8	3.9

==== Playoffs ====
Year	Team	GP	GS	MPG	FG%	3P%	FT%	RPG	APG	SPG	BPG	TO	PPG
1999	Charlotte	4	0	4.8	40.0	0.0	50.0	0.8	0.0	0.0	0.3	0.0	2.3
Career	1 year, 1 team	4	0	4.8	40.0	0.0	50.0	0.8	0.0	0.0	0.3	0.0	2.3

=== College ===
Year	Team	GP	GS	MPG	FG%	3P%	FT%	RPG	APG	SPG	BPG	TO	PPG
1997–98	Texas Tech	31	-	-	**51.4**	0.0	60.1	6.5	1.1	0.9	1.7	-	14.2
1998–99	Texas Tech	**34**	-	-	50.3	0.0	**61.8**	**8.7**	**1.9**	**1.2**	**1.9**	-	**20.3**°
**Career**		65	-	-	50.7	0.0	61.1	7.6	1.5	1.0	1.8	-	17.4
Statistics retrieved from Sports-Reference.
