= Oklahoma Sooners women's basketball =

Women's college basketball team

2026–27 Oklahoma Sooners women's basketball team
- University: University of Oklahoma
- First season: 1974 (52 years ago)
- Athletic director: Roger Denny
- Head coach: Jennie Baranczyk (6th season)
- Location: Norman, Oklahoma
- Arena: Lloyd Noble Center (capacity: 12,000)
- Conference: SEC
- Nickname: Sooners
- Colors: Crimson and cream

NCAA Division I tournament runner-up
- 2002
Other NCAA Division I tournament results
Final Four	2002, 2009, 2010
Elite Eight	2002, 2009, 2010
Sweet Sixteen	1986, 2000, 2001, 2002, 2006, 2007, 2009, 2010, 2011, 2013, 2025, 2026
Appearances	1986, 1995, 2000, 2001, 2002, 2003, 2004, 2005, 2006, 2007, 2008, 2009, 2010, 2011, 2012, 2013, 2014, 2015, 2016, 2017, 2018, 2022, 2023, 2024, 2025, 2026

Conference tournament champions
- 2002, 2004, 2006, 2007

Conference regular-season champions
- 2001, 2002, 2006, 2007, 2009, 2023, 2024

Uniforms
Home	Away

The Oklahoma Sooners women's basketball team represents the University of Oklahoma (OU) and competes in NCAA Division I as members of the Southeastern Conference (SEC).

== History ==
OU women's basketball began during the 1974–75 academic year. In March 1990, Oklahoma officials released a statement saying that the women's basketball program was to be dropped, after many years of sub-par performance and low attendance. Many people voiced their complaints, and eight days later, OU reinstated the program. At the time, the average attendance per game was 65 people. In 1996, Oklahoma hired former Norman High School women's basketball coach Sherri Coale to the same position at the university. The Sooner women's basketball team developed in years since to status as a leader in attendance across the nation. The Sooners averaged attendance of 6,851 in 2011–12 at home games, and the support for the sport led to Oklahoma hosting first- and second-round games in the Women's NCAA Basketball Championships at Lloyd Noble Center in Norman. The Sooners also set a record on February 2, 2009, when they played host to the number 13 Tennessee Lady Volunteers, led by coach Pat Summit, who was trying to get career victory 1,000, something that no other coach had done before. The attendance for that game, which was held at the Ford Center in Oklahoma City, was close to 13,000 as well as setting a record for the most watched women's basketball game in history. The Sooners led the Big 12 Conference in attendance as well. As with the men's team, they call Lloyd Noble Center home.

The program gained national prominence during the 2002 post-season when they advanced to the national title game and lost to the University of Connecticut Huskies. In the 2005–06 season, the Sooners were led by their coach Sherri Coale and the nationally known sophomore twins Courtney and Ashley Paris, daughters of former San Francisco 49ers offensive tackle Bubba Paris, to the third round of the national tournament. The team also won the Big 12 regular-season championship (with a 16–0 conference record) and the Big 12 Tournament. They became the first Big 12 women's basketball team to remain undefeated throughout conference play.

In the 2008–09 season, the Sooners made it to the Final Four of the 2009 NCAA Division I women's basketball tournament. They advanced through the Oklahoma City Regional, where they enjoyed considerable home court advantage, as Norman and Oklahoma City are separated by fewer than 20 miles.

The 2010–11 and 2011–12 seasons failed to result in regional championships and NCAA Final Four appearances. Playing through rigorous non-conference schedules and a rugged Big 12 slate, the Sooners received No. 6 seeds each of the two years. The 10–11 team advanced through the Charlottesville, Virginia, first and second round site with a win over nearby James Madison University and an upset win over the University of Miami Hurricanes. The season came to an abrupt halt in Dayton, Ohio, in the Sweet Sixteen, with the team falling to No. 2 seed Notre Dame, which steamrolled to a national championship appearance that year. The 11–12 team failed to make it past the No. 3 seed St. John's Red Storm in a 74–70 defeat in front of several thousand Sooner fans in Norman, Oklahoma. St. Johns lost in the Sweet Sixteen to the Duke Blue Devils in Fresno, California.

Oklahoma City hosted an NCAA regional in March 2013.

The 2012–13 Sooners missed graduating senior Jelena Serena, but retained the rest of the team. Adding to the corps were two National Top 20 recruits, Maddie Manning and Nicole Kornet, and Sooners Jasmine Hartman and Lyndsey Cloman rejoined the active roster. Both Hartman and Cloman sat out the entire 2011–12 season with injuries.

== Conference affiliations ==
Prior to joining the SEC, Oklahoma has played in the Big Eight and the Big 12 conferences. The Sooners joined the Big 12 in 1996 when the Big Eight and four members of the Southwest Conference created the Big 12. Oklahoma has been affiliated with the following conferences:

Conference	Years	Reason left
Big Eight Conference	1982–1996	Conference dissolved
Big 12 Conference	1996–2024	Joined SEC
Southeastern Conference	2024–present	

== Coaches ==
Since its formation in 1974, the team has been led by nine different head coaches. Since 2021, Jennie Baranczyk has served as the head coach of the program.

== Championships ==
=== Conference regular season ===
Season	Coach	Conference	Overall record	Conference record
1985–86	Maura McHugh	Big Eight	24–7	10–4
1999–2000§	Sherri Coale	Big 12	25–8	13–3
2000–01	Sherri Coale	Big 12	28–6	15–1
2001–02	Sherri Coale	Big 12	32–4	14–2
2005–06	Sherri Coale	Big 12	31–5	16–0
2006–07§	Sherri Coale	Big 12	28–5	13–3
2008–09	Sherri Coale	Big 12	32–5	15–1
2022–23§	Jennie Baranczyk	Big 12	26–7	14–4
2023–24	Jennie Baranczyk	Big 12	23–10	15–3
Conference regular season championships			9

§ – Conference co-champions

=== Conference tournament championships ===
Year	Coach	Opponent	Score	Site	Conference	Overall record	Conference record
2002	Sherri Coale	Baylor	84–69	Kansas City, Missouri	Big 12	32–4	14–2
2004	Sherri Coale	Texas	66–47	Dallas, Texas	Big 12	24–9	9–7
2006	Sherri Coale	Baylor	72–61	Dallas, Texas	Big 12	31–5	16–0
2007	Sherri Coale	Iowa State	67–60	Oklahoma City, OK	Big 12	28–5	13–3
Conference tournament championships							4

== NCAA tournament history ==
The Sooners reached the NCAA tournament and Sweet Sixteen for the first time in 1986. In 1995, Oklahoma made their second trip to the tourney, falling in the second round.

After another break, the Sooners made their third appearance in the 1999–2000 season, and have since become a mainstay in the tournament, entering the field of 64 every year since. In that period, the Sooners have reached three Final Four appearances, which is tied for 9th in NCAA women's basketball history. Since 2002, the Sooners' first appearance, their three appearances ties them for fifth, behind Tennessee (six), Connecticut (five), Stanford (five) and Louisiana State (five).

== NCAA tournament results ==
The Sooners have appeared in the NCAA Division I women's basketball tournament 26 times. They have a record of 40–26.

Year	Seed	Round	Opponent	Result
1986	(4)	Second Round; Sweet Sixteen	(5) Vanderbilt (1) Texas	W 86–67; L 59−85
1995	(7)	First Round; Second Round	(10) Loyola (MD) (2) Louisiana Tech	W 90−55; L 36–48
2000	(5)	First Round; Second Round; Sweet Sixteen	(12) BYU (4) Purdue (1) Connecticut	W 86–81; W 76–74; L 80–102
2001	(2)	First Round; Second Round; Sweet Sixteen	(15) Oral Roberts (10) Stanford (6) Washington	W 70–64; W 67–50; L 67–84
2002	(1)	First Round; Second Round; Sweet Sixteen; Elite Eight; Final Four; Title Game	(16) Hartford (9) Villanova (4) Texas Tech (3) Colorado (1) Duke (1) Connecticut	W 84–52; W 66–53; W 72–62; W 94–60; W 86–71; L 70–82
2003	(10)	First Round	(7) George Washington	L 61–71
2004	(3)	First Round; Second Round	(14) Marist (6) Stanford	W 58−45; L 43–68
2005	(8)	First Round	(9) Arizona	L 69–72
2006	(2)	First Round; Second Round; Sweet Sixteen	(15) Pepperdine (7) BYU (3) Stanford	W 78–66; W 86–70; L 74–88
2007	(3)	First Round; Second Round; Sweet Sixteen	(14) SE Missouri State (6) Marquette (7) Ole Miss	W 74–60; W 78–47; L 82–90
2008	(4)	First Round; Second Round	(13) Illinois State (5) Notre Dame	W 69−61; L 75–79 (OT)
2009	(1)	First Round; Second Round; Sweet Sixteen; Elite Eight; Final Four	(16) Prairie View A&M (9) Georgia Tech (4) Pittsburgh (6) Purdue (3) Louisville	W 76–47; W 69–50; W 70–59; W 74–68; L 59–61
2010	(3)	First Round; Second Round; Sweet Sixteen; Elite Eight; Final Four	(14) South Dakota State (11) Arkansas–Little Rock (2) Notre Dame (4) Kentucky (1) Stanford	W 68–57; W 60–44; W 77–72 (OT); W 88–68; L 66–73
2011	(6)	First Round; Second Round; Sweet Sixteen	(11) James Madison (3) Miami (FL) (2) Notre Dame	W 86–72; W 88–83; L 53–78
2012	(6)	First Round; Second Round	(11) Michigan (3) St. John's	W 88−67; L 70–74
2013	(6)	First Round; Second Round; Sweet Sixteen	(11) Central Michigan (3) UCLA (2) Tennessee	W 78–73; W 85–72; L 59–74
2014	(10)	First Round	(7) DePaul	L 100–104
2015	(5)	First Round; Second Round	(12) Quinnipiac (4) Stanford	W 111−84; L 76–86
2016	(6)	First Round; Second Round	(11) Purdue (3) Kentucky	W 61−45; L 58–79
2017	(6)	First Round; Second Round	(11) Gonzaga (3) Washington	W 75−62; L 82–108
2018	(12)	First Round	(5) DePaul	L 79–90
2022	(4)	First Round; Second Round	(13) IUPUI (5) Notre Dame	W 78–72; L 64–108
2023	(5)	First Round; Second Round	(13) Portland (4) UCLA	W 85–63; L 73–82
2024	(5)	First Round; Second Round	(12) Florida Gulf Coast (4) Indiana	W 73–70; L 68–75
2025	(3)	First Round; Second Round; Sweet Sixteen	(14) Florida Gulf Coast (6) Iowa (2) Connecticut	W 81–58; W 96–62; L 59–82
2026	(4)	First Round; Second Round; Sweet Sixteen	(13) Idaho (5) Michigan State (1) South Carolina	W 89–59; W 77–71; L 68–94

=== NCAA tournament seeding history ===
The following lists the years in which the Sooners have been seeded in the NCAA tournament.

Years →	'86	'95	'00	'01	'02	'03	'04	'05	'06	'07	'08	'09	'10	'11	'12	'13	'14	'15	'16	'17	'18	'22	'23	'24	'25	'26
Seeds →	4	7	5	2	1	10	3	8	2	3	4	1	3	6	6	6	10	5	6	6	12	4	5	5	3	4
