= Kansas State Wildcats women's basketball =

Kansas State Wildcats
2026–27 Kansas State Wildcats women's basketball team
- University: Kansas State University
- Athletic director: Gene Taylor
- Head coach: Jeff Mittie (13th season)
- Location: Manhattan, Kansas
- Arena: Bramlage Coliseum (capacity: 11,000)
- Conference: Big 12
- Nickname: Wildcats
- Colors: Royal purple and white
- All-time record: 1043–664 (.616)

NCAA Division I tournament Elite Eight
- 1982
Other NCAA Division I tournament results
Sweet Sixteen	1982, 1983, 1984, 2002, 2025
Appearances	1982, 1983, 1984, 1987, 1997, 2002, 2003, 2004, 2005, 2008, 2009, 2011, 2012, 2016, 2017, 2019, 2022, 2024, 2025

AIAW tournament quarterfinals
- 1977
Other AIAW tournament results
Second round	1973, 1974, 1975, 1977, 1979, 1980
Appearances	1973, 1974, 1975, 1977, 1979, 1980

Conference tournament champions
- 1976, 1977, 1982, 1984

Conference regular-season champions
- Kansas State Conference; 1972, 1973, 1974, 1975, 1976, 1977, 1978, 1979; Big Eight Conference; 1983, 1984, 1987; Big 12 Conference; 2004, 2008

WNIT champions
- 2006

Uniforms
Home	Away	Alternate

The Kansas State Wildcats women's basketball is the program that is an intercollegiate basketball part of the Kansas State Wildcats. The program is offically classified in the NCAA Division I level, and the team currently competes in the Big 12 Conference.

The team has been invited to 22 NCAA and AIAW tournaments (second-most among Big 12 teams), and was crowned champion of the 2006 Women's National Invitation Tournament. Kansas State is in the top 20 all-time for wins among Division I programs.

The team's head coach is Jeff Mittie. He was hired before the 2014–2015 season, after spending the prior fifteen seasons at TCU.

== History ==
Kansas State began offering women's basketball as an organized intercollegiate sport in the 1968–1969 school year, under head coach Judy Akers. Because the NCAA did not sponsor women's sports until 1982, the governing bodies for women's basketball in the earliest years were the Commission on Intercollegiate Athletics for Women (CIAW) and the AIAW.

The Big Eight Conference likewise did not sponsor women's basketball in its earliest years, so Kansas State competed against the University of Kansas, Wichita State, and other state schools for the "Kansas State Conference" championship. Kansas State won eight straight Kansas Conference titles, from 1972 to 1979. The Big Eight Conference began offering a mid-season basketball tournament in the 1975–1976 season, and then began sponsoring a regular season competition in 1982–1983. Kansas State won the first two Big Eight tournament titles, in 1976 and 1977, and then won the first two Big Eight regular season titles, in 1983 and 1984.

The longest-tenured and winningest head coach in team history is Deb Patterson. Patterson spent eighteen years at Kansas State and compiled a 350–226 (.608) record. She won two Big 12 Conference titles (2004 and 2008) and a WNIT title (2006). Before Patterson, the winningest coach at Kansas State was Judy Akers, the first coach in program history, who compiled a 206–94 (.687) record. Akers also captured eight Kansas State Conference titles (1972–1979) and the first two titles in the Big Eight Conference after it began sponsoring women's basketball (1976 and 1977 mid-season tournaments).

== Postseason history ==
=== NCAA tournament results ===
Kansas State has appeared in the NCAA Division I women's basketball tournament nineteen times. They have a record of 17–19.

Year	Seed	Round	Opponent	Result
1982	#4	First round Sweet Sixteen; Elite Eight	#5 Stephen F. Austin #1 Old Dominion #2 Cheyney	W 78–75; W 76–67; L 93–71
1983	#3	First round Sweet Sixteen	#6 Illinois State #2 Texas	W 91–72; L 73–70 ^{OT}
1984	#3	First round	#6 Northeast Louisiana	L 78–73
1987	#9	First round	#8 Northwestern	L 62–61
1997	#10	First round	#7 Saint Joseph's	L 70–52
2002	#3	First round Second round Sweet Sixteen	#14 Kent State #6 Arkansas #7 Old Dominion	W 93–65; W 82–68; L 82–62
2003	#3	First round Second round	#14 Harvard #11 Notre Dame	W 79–69; L 59–53
2004	#2	First round Second round	#15 Valparaiso #7 Minnesota	W 71–63; L 80–61
2005	#4	First round Second round	#13 Bowling Green #5 Vanderbilt	W 70–60; L 63–60
2008	#5	First round Second round	#12 Chattanooga #4 Louisville	W 69–59; L 80–63
2009	#5	First round Second round	#12 Drexel #4 Vanderbilt	W 68–44; L 74–61
2011	#8	First round	#9 Purdue	L 53–45
2012	#8	First round Second round	#9 Princeton #1 Connecticut	W 67–64; L 72–26
2016	#9	First round Second round	#8 George Washington #1 South Carolina	W 56–51; L 73–47
2017	#7	First round Second round	#10 Drake #2 Stanford	W 67–54; L 69–48
2019	#9	First round	#8 Michigan	L 84–54
2022	#9	First round Second round	#8 Washington State #1 NC State	W 50–40; L 89–57
2024	#4	First round Second round	#13 Portland #5 Colorado	W 78–65; L 63–50
2025	#5	First round Second round Sweet Sixteen	#12 Fairfield #4 Kentucky #1 USC	W 85–41; W 80–79 ^{OT} L 61–67

=== NCAA Tournament seeding history ===
Years →	'82	'83	'84	'87	'97	'02	'03	'04	'05	'08	'09	'11	'12	'16	'17	'19	'22	'24	'25
Seeds→	4	3	3	9	10	3	3	2	4	5	5	8	8	9	7	9	9	4	5

=== WNIT results ===
Kansas State has appeared in the Women's National Invitation Tournament eight times, including the first tournament held, in 1969. Kansas State won the tournament in 2006 and reached the semifinals (final four) again in 2007 and 2013.

Year	Round	Opponent	Result
1969	First round	Wayland Baptist	L 76–21
1970	First round	Wayland Baptist	L 61–43
1999	First round Second round	Creighton; Arkansas State	W 71–60; L 83–70
2006	Second round Third Round; Quarterfinals; Semifinals; Championship	Idaho State; Fresno State; Nebraska; Western Kentucky; Marquette	W 88–68; W 64–61; W 77–63; W 57–56 ^{OT} W 77–65
2007	Second round Third Round; Quarterfinals; Semifinals	Southern Illinois; Illinois; Auburn; Wyoming	W 72–46; W 66–51; W 67–54; L 89–79 ^{3OT}
2013	First round Second round Third Round; Fourth Round; Semifinals	Texas Southern; Illinois State; Ball State; Illinois; Utah	W 72–44; W 57–48; W 60–48; W 66–48; L 54–46 ^{OT}
2015	First round Second round	Akron; Missouri	W 86–68; L 67–48
2018	First round Second round Third Round	Saint Louis; Utah; UC Davis	W 75–61; W 74–57; L 69–71
2023	First round Second round Super 16	Wichita State; Wyoming; Washington	W 90–56; W 71–55; L 48–55

=== AIAW tournament results ===
The Wildcats appeared in six AIAW tournaments prior to the creation of the NCAA tournament. In 1971, Kansas State also appeared in the even earlier tournament sponsored by the Commission on Intercollegiate Athletics for Women (CIAW), advancing to the Elite Eight.

The Wildcats had a combined record of 7–10.

Year	Round	Opponent	Result
1973	First round Consolation first round Consolation second round Consolation third round	Southern Connecticut; Long Beach State; East Carolina; South Carolina	L, 52–56; W, 49–43; W, 47–46; W, 69–57
1974	First round Consolation first round	Immaculata; Wayland Baptist	L, 40–50; L, 34–49
1975	First round Consolation first round Consolation second round Consolation third round	Immaculata; Boise State; Ohio State; William Penn	L, 54–63; W, 65–37; W, 61–51; L, 43–54
1977	First round Quarterfinals; Consolation second round	Utah; Tennessee; Tennessee Tech	W, 70–32; L, 69–81; L, 58–68
1979	First round Consolation round	Old Dominion; Valdosta State	L, 75–96; L, 92–104
1980	First round Second round	Boston University; Tennessee	W, 72–68; L, 64–84

== Notable Wildcat players and coaches ==
- Judy Akers — 2003 KSU Hall of Fame Inductee
- Brittany Chambers
- Kamie Ethridge — KSU assistant coach, now head coach at Washington State
- Olga Firsova
- Priscilla Gary-Sweeney — 1998 KSU Hall of Fame Inductee
- Marlies Gipson
- Lynn Hickey — 2004 KSU Hall of Fame Inductee
- Lynn Holzman — West Coast Conference commissioner, 2014–present
- Laurie Koehn
- Ayoka Lee — Set NCAA Division I scoring record with 61 points on January 23, 2022
- Shalee Lehning
- Breanna Lewis
- Megan Mahoney
- Nicole Ohlde
- Shanele Stires
- Kendra Wecker
- Leann Wilcox, first scholarship player in program history, contestant on Squid Game: The Challenge (player 302)

=== Draft history ===
WNBA Draft Picks
Round	Pick	Overall	Player	Year
1st	4th	4th	Kendra Wecker	2005
1st	6th	6th	Nicole Ohlde	2004
1st	13th	13th	Olga Firsova	2000
2nd	10th	22nd	Brittany Chambers	2013
2nd	11th	23rd	Breanna Lewis	2017
2nd	12th	25th	Shalee Lehning	2009
3rd	1st	26th	Serena Sundell	2025
3rd	8th	34th	Megan Mahoney	2005
4th	8th	56th	Shanele Stires	2000

== Head coaches ==
- Judy Akers (1968–1979)
- Lynn Hickey (1979–1984)
- Matilda Mossman (1984–1989)
- Gaye Griffin (1989–1990)
- Susan Yow (1990–1993)
- Brian Agler (1993–1996)
- Jack Hartman (1996; coached final seven games)
- Deb Patterson (1996–2014)
- Jeff Mittie (2014–present)

== Year by year results ==
- The Big Eight Conference began sponsoring a mid-season tournament in the 1975–1976 season, but no regular season competition until 1982–1983. Kansas State competed for "Kansas State Conference" regular season titles in the years before the Big Eight began offering regular season competition.

Season	Team	Overall	Conference	Standing	Postseason	Coaches' poll	AP poll
Judy Akers (Independent, Kansas State Conference/Big 8) (1968–1979)
1968–69	Judy Akers	11–3	–		NWIT Eighth place		
1969–70	Judy Akers	10–7	–		CIAW Quarterfinals, NWIT Seventh place		
1970–71	Judy Akers	12–12	–		CIAW Tenth place		
1971–72	Judy Akers	17–5	–	1st	AIAW Region VI		
1972–73	Judy Akers	20–6	–	1st	AIAW Ninth place		
1973–74	Judy Akers	21–9	–	1st	AIAW Region VI		
1974–75	Judy Akers	24–9	–	1st	AIAW Sixth place		
1975–76	Judy Akers	28–6	6–0	1st	AIAW Region VI		
1976–77	Judy Akers	23–12	–	1st	AIAW Quarterfinals		20
1977–78	Judy Akers	20–14	–	1st	AIAW Region VI		
1978–79	Judy Akers	20–11	–	1st	AIAW South Sectional		
Judy Akers:		206–94	–				
Lynn Hickey (Independent/Big 8) (1979–1984)
1979–80	Lynn Hickey	26–9	–		AIAW Sixteen (Play-In)		13
1980–81	Lynn Hickey	23–11	–		AIAW Region VI		
1981–82	Lynn Hickey	26–6	–		NCAA Quarterfinals		14
1982–83	Lynn Hickey	25–7	12–2	1st	NCAA Sixteen		17
1983–84	Lynn Hickey	25–6	12–2	T-1st	NCAA First round		7
Lynn Hickey:		125–39	24–4				
Matilda Mossman (Big 8) (1984–1990)
1984–85	Matilda Mossman	16–13	6–8				
1985–86	Matilda Mossman	16–13	6–8				
1986–87	Matilda Mossman	22–9	9–5	T-1st	NCAA First round		
1987–88	Matilda Mossman	8–20	1–13				
1988–89	Matilda Mossman	18–11	7–7	3rd			
1989	Matilda Mossman	3–2	–				
Matilda Mossman:		83–68	29–41				
Gaye Griffin (Big 8) (1989–1990)
1989–90	Gaye Griffin	17–8	10–4				
Gaye Griffin:		17–8	10–4				
Susan Yow (Big 8) (1990–1993)
1990–91	Susan Yow	16–11	8–6				
1991–92	Susan Yow	5–23	2–12				
1992–93	Susan Yow	10–17	1–13				
Susan Yow:		31–51	11–31				
Brian Agler (Big 8) (1993–1996)
1993–94	Brian Agler	13–14	5–9				
1994–95	Brian Agler	14–13	6–8				
1995–96	Brian Agler	11–12	3–7				
Brian Agler:		38–39	14–24				
Jack Hartman (Big 8) (1996–1997)
1996	Jack Hartman	3–4	2–2				
Jack Hartman:		3–4	2–2				
Deb Patterson (Big 12) (1996–2014)
1996–97	Deb Patterson	19–12	9–7	T-5th	NCAA First round		
1997–98	Deb Patterson	11–17	4–12	T-9th			
1998–99	Deb Patterson	16–14	7–9	T-8th	WNIT Second round		
1999–00	Deb Patterson	13–17	6–10	8th			
2000–01	Deb Patterson	12–16	2–14	T-11th			
2001–02	Deb Patterson	26–8	11–5	T-3rd	NCAA Sixteen	10	11
2002–03	Deb Patterson	29–5	14–2	2nd	NCAA Second round	10	8
2003–04	Deb Patterson	25–6	14–2	T-1st	NCAA Second round	15	8
2004–05	Deb Patterson	24–8	12–4	T-3rd	NCAA Second round	19	16
2005–06	Deb Patterson	24–10	8–8	T-6th	WNIT Champions		
2006–07	Deb Patterson	19–15	4–12	T-11th	WNIT Semifinals		
2007–08	Deb Patterson	22–10	13–3	1st	NCAA Second round	21	16
2008–09	Deb Patterson	25–8	10–6	5th	NCAA Second round	20	21
2009–10	Deb Patterson	14–18	5–11	T-8th			
2010–11	Deb Patterson	21–11	10–6	T-3rd	NCAA First round		
2011–12	Deb Patterson	20–14	9–9	T-4th	NCAA Second round		
2012–13	Deb Patterson	19–18	5–13	T-8th	WNIT Semifinals		
2013–14	Deb Patterson	11–19	5–13	T-8th			
Deb Patterson:		350–226	148–147				
Jeff Mittie (Big 12) (2014–present)
2014–15	Jeff Mittie	19–14	7–11	T–7th	WNIT Second round		
2015–16	Jeff Mittie	19–13	8–10	T–6th	NCAA second round		
2016–17	Jeff Mittie	23–11	11–7	4th	NCAA second round	24	
2017–18	Jeff Mittie	18–15	7–11	T–7th	WNIT Third Round		
2018–19	Jeff Mittie	21–11	11–7	4th	NCAA first round		
2019-20	Jeff Mittie	16–13	10–8	T–4th	Cancelled due to COVID-19		
2020-21	Jeff Mittie	9–18	3–15	10th			
2021-22	Jeff Mittie	20–13	9–9	6th	NCAA second round		
2022-23	Jeff Mittie	19–17	5–13	9th	WNIT Super 16		
2023-24	Jeff Mittie	26–8	13–5	3rd	NCAA second round	19	18
2024-25	Jeff Mittie	27–7	13–5	T-4th	NCAA Sweet Sixteen	19	18
2025-26	Jeff Mittie	6–6	0–0				
Jeff Mittie:		223–148	97–101				
Total:		1076–677	335–355				
National champion Postseason invitational champion Conference regular season champion Conference regular season and conference tournament champion Division regular season champion Division regular season and conference tournament champion Conference tournament champion

== Series records ==
=== Record vs. Big 12 opponents ===
Kansas State vs.	Overall record	at Manhattan	at Opponent's Venue	at neutral site	Last 5 meetings	Last 10 meetings	Current streak
Arizona	KSU, 1–0	KSU, 1–0	0–0	0–0	KSU, 1–0	KSU, 1–0	W 1
Arizona State	ASU, 3–2	KSU, 1–0	ASU, 1–0	ASU, 2–1	ASU, 3–2	ASU, 3–2	W 1
Baylor	BU, 44–12	BU, 14–6	BU, 19–2	BU, 11–4	BAY, 3–2	BU, 7–3	L 1
BYU	KSU, 5–0	KSU, 2–0	KSU, 2–0	KSU, 1–0	KSU, 5–0	KSU, 5–0	W 5
Cincinnati	KSU, 3–0	KSU, 1–0	KSU, 2–0	0–0	KSU, 3–0	KSU, 3–0	W 3
Colorado	tied, 35–35	KSU, 18–14	CU, 17–13	tied, 4–4	KSU, 3–2	KSU, 7–3	L 2
Houston	KSU, 4–0	KSU, 2–0	KSU, 2–0	0–0	KSU, 4–0	KSU, 4–0	W 4
Iowa State	KSU, 55–50	KSU, 29–19	ISU, 29–18	ISU, 8–2	ISU, 3–2	ISU, 8–2	L 1
Kansas	KSU, 82–51	KSU, 40–16	KSU, 34–29	KSU, 8–6	KSU, 4–1	KSU, 6–4	W 2
Oklahoma State	KSU, 43–38	KSU, 24–11	OSU, 21–14	OSU, 6–4	KSU, 3–2	tied, 5–5	L 1
TCU	tied, 12–12	KSU, 8–4	TCU, 7–4	TCU, 1–0	KSU, 4–1	KSU, 6–4	W 2
Texas Tech	KSU, 29–17	KSU, 13–6	KSU, 12–9	KSU, 4–2	KSU, 3–2	KSU, 6–4	W 3
UCF	KSU, 4–0	KSU, 2–0	KSU, 1–0	KSU, 1–0	KSU, 4–0	KSU, 4–0	W 4
Utah	tied, 4–4	tied, 2–2	UU, 2–1	KSU, 1–0	UU, 3–2	tied, 4–4	W 2
West Virginia	WVU, 20–9	WVU, 8–4	WVU, 9–3	WVU, 3–2	WVU, 3–2	WVU, 7–3	L 2
*As of 3/21/2025

=== Record vs. former Big 12 opponents ===
Kansas State vs.	Overall record	at Manhattan	at Opponent's Venue	at neutral site	Last 5 meetings	Last 10 meetings	Current streak	Last meeting
Missouri	KSU, 46–39	KSU, 27–11	MU, 23–13	KSU, 6–4	MU, 3–2	KSU, 6–4	W 1	12/9/2023
Nebraska	KSU, 46–33	KSU, 27–10	NU, 21–13	KSU, 6–2	NU, 3–2	tied, 5–5	W 2	2/19/2011
Oklahoma	OU, 45–32	KSU, 19–17	OU, 25–10	tied, 3–3	OU, 4–1	OU, 7–3	L 1	1/31/2024
Texas	UT, 33–18	UT, 12–10	UT, 17–5	UT, 4–3	UT, 4–1	UT, 9–1	L 2	3/11/2024
Texas A&M	KSU, 13–9	KSU, 7–2	KSU, 5–4	TAM, 3–1	TAM, 3–2	TAM, 6–4	L 2	12/19/2012
*As of 3/21/2025

== See also ==
- Kansas State Wildcats men's basketball
