= Nebraska Cornhuskers women's basketball =

University of Nebraska–Lincoln women's basketball team

2026–27 Nebraska Cornhuskers women's basketball team
- University: University of Nebraska–Lincoln
- Founded: 1975; 51 years ago
- Athletic director: Troy Dannen
- Head coach: Amy Williams (11th season)
- Location: Lincoln, Nebraska
- Arena: Pinnacle Bank Arena (capacity: 15,000)
- Conference: Big Ten
- Nickname: Cornhuskers
- Colors: Scarlet and cream

NCAA Division I tournament Sweet Sixteen
- 2010, 2013

NCAA Division I tournament appearances
- 1988, 1993, 1996, 1998, 1999, 2000, 2007, 2008, 2010, 2012, 2013, 2014, 2015, 2018, 2022, 2024, 2025, 2026

Conference tournament champions
- 2014

Conference regular-season champions
- 1988, 2010

Uniforms
Home	Away

The Nebraska Cornhuskers women's basketball is the team that competes as part of NCAA Division I, representing the University of Nebraska–Lincoln as they are a member in the Big Ten Conference. Nebraska has played their home games at Pinnacle Bank Arena since its construction in 2013.

The program became a varsity sport in 1975 and has since made seventeen appearances in the NCAA Division I tournament, reaching the Sweet Sixteen twice. Connie Yori set most Nebraska coaching records in her fourteen seasons as head coach, leading the Cornhuskers to a record-breaking 32–2 season in 2009–10. Three Cornhuskers were named first-team All-Americans and two have competed in the Summer Olympic Games. The team has been coached by Amy Williams since 2016.

== History ==
=== Early years ===
Nebraska's women's basketball history began shortly after the rules of basketball were published by James Naismith – in March 1898, Louise Pound captained NU against a team from Council Bluffs in the school's first women's athletic competition. Pound remained influential after graduating, managing a varsity squad that faced opposition from across the Midwest over the next decade. Despite its popularity throughout the school and region, university administration ended the program in 1910 because it felt athletic competition was "inadvisable" for women's health. NU did not officially sponsor another women's sport for sixty years.

The university established several women's club teams in the early 1970s that became varsity programs after the 1972 enactment of Title IX. Volunteer head coach George Nicodemus led Nebraska's first varsity season of women's basketball competition, finishing 22–9 and reaching the second round of the 1975 AIAW Tournament. Nicodemus departed after two years; his replacement, Marcia Walker, resigned midway through the 1977–78 season after conflicts with players and administration. Nebraska hired Lorrie Gallagher, a California native who brought four starters from Feather River College. The hard-nosed coach spent two years in Lincoln and led the Cornhuskers to back-to-back twenty-three-win seasons, a school record until 2010.

Nebraska struggled through Colleen Matsuhara and Kelly Hill's three-year tenures, making a single postseason appearance and failing to place higher than fourth in the new Big Eight regular season (prior to 1982–83, the Big Eight held a midseason tournament but did not sponsor a regular-season championship).

=== First national success ===
NU hired twenty-nine-year-old Angela Beck in 1986 and within two years reached its first NCAA Division I tournament. Beck's early teams were led by Omaha native Maurtice Ivy, who became the program's first 2,000-point scorer during a 1988 Big Eight championship run. Karen Jennings broke most of Ivy's scoring records in the early 1990s, twice being named Big Eight player of the year and winning the Wade Trophy as the country's best player in 1992–93. She led Nebraska to its first men's or women's NCAA basketball tournament victory in 1993 and was a member of the inaugural Nebraska Athletic Hall of Fame class.

Beck resigned after the 1996–97 season to coach the San Jose Lasers of the short-lived American Basketball League. NU hired veteran head coach Paul Sanderford, five years removed from taking Western Kentucky to the national championship game. Sanderford's hiring stirred controversy amid an administrative push to hire more female coaches, and his initial base salary of $120,000 was significantly more than his predecessor earned. After reaching three consecutive NCAA tournaments, Sanderford's program suffered back-to-back losing seasons and the unexpected exit of three high-profile players in 2002. Months later, he announced his immediate resignation for health reasons, undergoing a heart operation the same week.

Athletic director Bill Byrne led a brief coaching search that ended with the hiring of Connie Yori from nearby Creighton. A depleted Nebraska roster struggled through Yori's first season, finishing 8–20 and last in the Big 12.

=== Reaching new heights ===
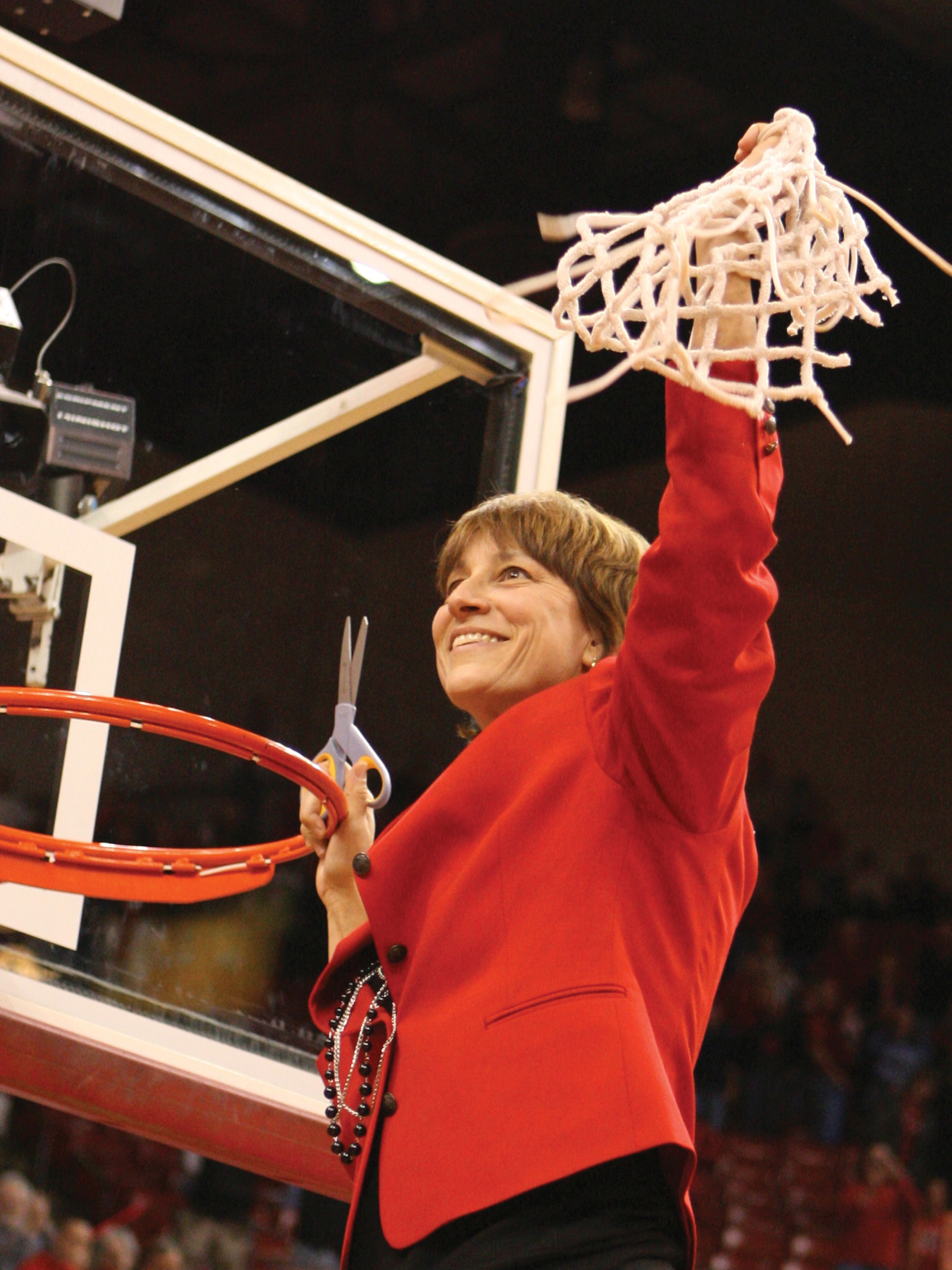
Connie Yori, Nebraska's all-time winningest coach, led the Cornhuskers to a 32–2 season in 2009–10

Yori steadily built Nebraska into a national contender, beginning a stretch of seven consecutive postseason berths with a WNIT appearance in 2004, highlighted by a triple-overtime win over eventual national champion Baylor. Kiera Hardy and sophomore Kelsey Griffin led NU back to the NCAA tournament in 2007. Yori's rebuild culminated in a 2009–10 season that ranks as the best in school history. NU started 30–0 and became the first Big 12 men's or women's basketball team to complete an undefeated regular season. Nebraska celebrated its Big 12 title, clinched days prior, in front of the first sellout crowd at the Bob Devaney Sports Center in program history. The Cornhuskers reached the regional semifinals for the first time, but were upset by Kentucky to finish 32–2. Griffin, returning from a medical redshirt, was a national player of the year finalist and Yori was named national coach of the year.

Nebraska missed the postseason the year after Griffin's graduation, but followed with four consecutive seasons of at least twenty wins. Jordan Hooper led Nebraska in its first three seasons in the Big Ten, earning first-team All-America honors in 2013–14, the same season NU won its first conference tournament.

=== Big Ten consistency ===
In February 2016, athletic director Shawn Eichorst ordered an administrative officer to be present at every women's basketball team event following allegations against Yori. She resigned two months later, with Eichorst concluding Yori had mistreated her players and fostered a "negative, dysfunctional culture" that included asking support staff to testify on her behalf in court. She departed after fourteen seasons with eighty-nine more wins than any coach before her.

Days later, Nebraska hired Amy Williams, a program alumnus who played guard under Beck and Sanderford. Williams began her head coaching career at NAIA Rogers State, starting the program from scratch, later winning two Summit League championships and the 2016 WNIT with South Dakota. After a 7–22 debut season, Williams led NU to the NCAA tournament in 2018 and was named the Big Ten's coach of the year. The Cornhuskers went just 13–13 in a COVID-19 shortened 2020–21 season, but were invited to the WNIT in the first of six consecutive postseason appearances. NU reached the Big Ten championship game in 2024 and defeated Texas A&M in the opening round for its first NCAA tournament win in over a decade.

== Conference affiliations ==
- Independent (1975–1982) (Note: The Big Eight held a midseason tournament each season from 1975–76 to 1981–82, but did not sponsor a regular-season championship until 1982–83.)
- Big Eight Conference (1982–1996)
- Big 12 Conference (1996–2011)
- Big Ten Conference (2011–present)

== Coaches ==
=== Coaching history ===
No.	Coach	Tenure	Overall	Conference
1	George Nicodemus	1975–1977	42–25 (.627)	
2	Marcia Walker	1977–1978	11–18 (.379)	
3	Lorrie Gallagher	1978–1980	46–30 (.605)	
4	Colleen Matsuhara	1980–1983	46–44 (.511)	5–9 (.357)
5	Kelly Hill	1983–1986	37–47 (.440)	15–27 (.357)
6	Angela Beck	1986–1996	191–128 (.599)	80–76 (.513)
7	Paul Sanderford	1997–2002	88–69 (.561)	37–43 (.463)
8	Connie Yori	2002–2016	280–166 (.628)	121–107 (.531)
9	Amy Williams	2016–present	165–123 (.564)	79–80 (.497)

=== Coaching staff ===
Name	Position	First year	Alma mater
Amy Williams	Head coach	2016	Nebraska
Julian Assibey	Assistant coach	2023	William Penn
Taylor Edwards	Assistant coach	2025	Montana State Billings
Brad Fischer	Assistant coach	2026	Wisconsin–La Crosse
Jessica Keller	Assistant coach	2022	Quincy
Tandem Mays	Assistant coach	2016	Tulsa

== Venues ==
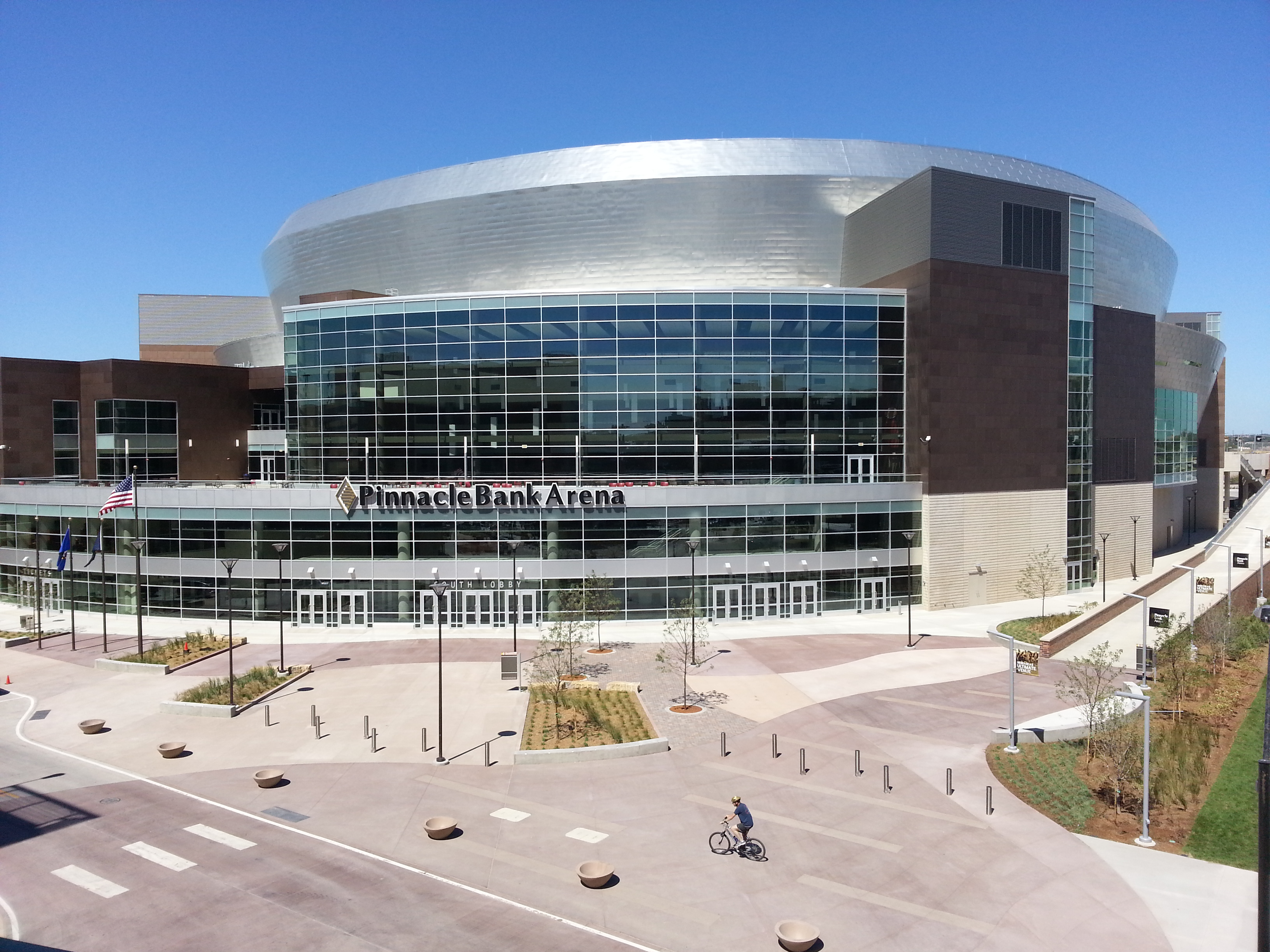
Nebraska has played at Pinnacle Bank Arena since 2013

Nebraska played its first season as a varsity program at the NU Coliseum before spending nearly four decades at the NU Sports Complex (later the Bob Devaney Sports Center). The Cornhuskers won an arena-record twenty-nine consecutive games at the Devaney Center from December 1986 to January 1989.

Nebraska moved to Pinnacle Bank Arena in 2013. It has a listed capacity of 15,000 for women's basketball games. The team has ranked in the top twenty-five nationally in home attendance each year since moving to Pinnacle Bank Arena.

Pinnacle Bank Arena hosted third- and fourth-round games in the 2014 NCAA Division I tournament, which featured eventual national champion Connecticut. Fourth-seeded Nebraska was upset by BYU in the second round and did not play on its home court.

== Championships and awards ==
=== Conference championships ===
Regular season

- Big Eight: 1987–88
- Big 12: 2009–10

Tournament

- Big Ten: 2013–14

=== Individual awards ===
- Wade Trophy: Karen Jennings (1993)
- National coach of the year: Connie Yori (2009–10)
- Conference player of the year: Maurtice Ivy (1987–88), Karen Jennings (1991–92, 1992–93), Kelsey Griffin (2009–10), Jordan Hooper (2013–14)
- Conference freshman / newcomer of the year: Kim Harris (1987–88), Karen Jennings (1989–90), Meggan Yedsena (1990–91), Keasha Cannon (2001–02), Jelena Spiric (2004–05), Jessica Shepard (2015–16), Alexis Markowski (2021–22), Natalie Potts (2023–24)
- Conference coach of the year: Angela Beck (1987–88), Connie Yori (2009–10, 2012–13, 2013–14), Amy Williams (2017–18)

=== First-team All-Americans ===
- Karen Jennings – 1992–93
- Kelsey Griffin – 2009–10
- Jordan Hooper – 2013–14

=== Retired numbers ===
No.	Player	Position	Tenure	Retired (Note: The year the player's jersey was retired by the university.)
23	Kelsey Griffin	F	2005–2010	2014
30	Maurtice Ivy	G	1984–1988	2011
35	Jordan Hooper	F	2010–2014	2024
51	Karen Jennings	F	1989–1993	1994

== NCAA Division I tournament results ==
Nebraska has appeared in eighteen NCAA Division I tournaments with a record of 10–18.

Year	Seed	Round	Opponent	Result
1988	5 W	Second round	(4 W) USC	L 100–82
1993	6 W	First round Second round	(11 W) San Diego (3 W) USC	W 81–58; L 78–60
1996	9 W	First round	(8 W) Colorado State	L 66–62
1998	9 E	First round Second round	(8 E) New Mexico (1 E) Old Dominion	W 76–59; L 75–60
1999	11 W	First round	(6 W) Kentucky	L 98–92
2000	12 ME	First round	(5 ME) Boston College	L 93–76
2007	9	First round	(8) Temple	L 64–61
2008	8	First round Second round	(9) Xavier (1) Maryland	W 61–58; L 76–64
2010	1	First round Second round Regional semifinals	(16) Northern Iowa (8) UCLA (4) Kentucky	W 83–44; W 83–70; L 76–67
2012	6	First round	(11) Kansas	L 57–49
2013	6	First round Second round Regional semifinals	(11) Chattanooga (3) Texas A&M (2) Duke	W 72–59; W 74–63; L 53–45
2014	4	First round Second round	(13) Fresno State (12) BYU	W 74–55; L 80–76
2015	9	First round	(8) Syracuse	L 72–69
2018	10	First round	(7) Arizona State	L 73–62
2022	8	First round	(9) Gonzaga	L 68–55
2024	6	First round Second round	(11) Texas A&M (3) Oregon State	W 61–59; L 61–51
2025	10	First round	(7) Louisville	L 63–58
2026	11	First four First round	(11) Richmond (6) Baylor	W 75–56; L 62–67

== After Nebraska ==
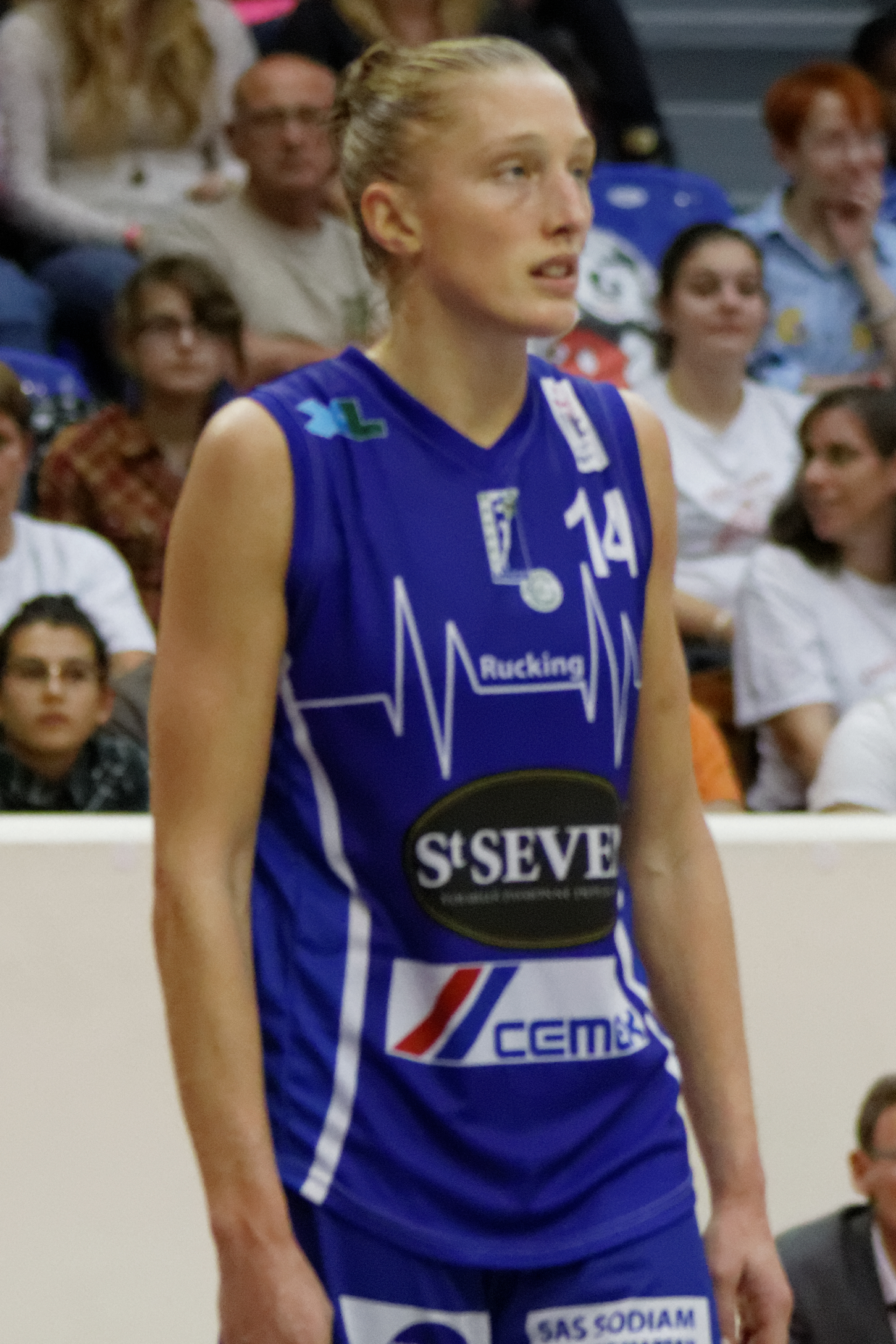
Danielle Page won a bronze medal with Serbia in Rio de Janeiro at the 2016 Summer Olympics

=== Olympians ===
Olympiad	City	Player	Country	Finish
2012 (XXX)	(United Kingdom) London	Chelsea Aubry (Note: Aubry also represented Canada in the qualifying round of the 2008 Summer Olympics.)	Canada	Quarterfinal
2016 (XXXI)	(Brazil) Rio de Janeiro	Danielle Page	Serbia	(bronze) Third place

=== WNBA players ===
- Nicole Kubik – 2000–2001
- Anna DeForge – 2000–2009; Two-time WNBA All-Star
- Danielle Page – 2008
- Kelsey Griffin – 2010–2014; WNBA All-Rookie Team
- Lindsey Moore – 2013–2014; WNBA champion with Minnesota Lynx
- Jordan Hooper – 2014–2017
- Yvonne Turner – 2017–2023
- Jaz Shelley - 2023
