= 2011 Big 12 Conference women's basketball tournament =

- Classification: Division I
- Teams: 12
- Site: Municipal Auditorium; Kansas City, Missouri
- Champions: Baylor (3rd title)
- Winning coach: Kim Mulkey (3rd title)
- MVP: Brittney Griner (Baylor)
- Attendance: 25,400 (overall); 4,250 (championship)
- Television: Metro Sports, FSN

2010–11 Big 12 Conference women's basketball standings
	Conf.				Overall
Team	W		L	PCT	W		L	PCT
No. 3 Baylor †	15	–	1	.938	34	–	3	.919
No. 7 Texas A&M	13	–	3	.813	33	–	5	.868
No. 21 Oklahoma	10	–	6	.625	23	–	12	.657
Kansas State	10	–	6	.625	21	–	11	.656
Iowa State	9	–	7	.563	22	–	11	.667
Texas Tech	8	–	8	.500	22	–	11	.667
Texas	7	–	9	.438	19	–	14	.576
Kansas	6	–	10	.375	21	–	13	.618
Colorado	6	–	10	.375	18	–	16	.529
Missouri	5	–	11	.313	13	–	18	.419
Oklahoma State	4	–	12	.250	17	–	15	.531
Nebraska	3	–	13	.188	13	–	18	.419
† 2011 Big 12 Tournament winner Rankings from AP poll

The 2011 Big 12 Conference women's basketball tournament, known for sponsorship reasons as the 2011 Phillips 66 Big 12 Women's Basketball Championship, was the 2011 edition of the Big 12 Conference's championship tournament. The tournament was held at the Municipal Auditorium in Kansas City from 8 March until 12 March 2011. The Quarterfinals, Semifinals, and Finals were televised on Fox Sports Net. The championship game, held on March 12, 2011, featured the number 1 seeded Baylor Lady Bears, and the number 2 seeded Texas A&M Aggies. Baylor won the contest by a 61-58 margin.

== Seeding ==
2011 Big 12 Conference women's basketball tournament seeds
Seed	School	Conf.	Over.	Tiebreaker
1	Baylor ‡#	15–1	34–3	
2	Texas A&M #	13–3	33–5	
3	Oklahoma #	10–6	23–12	
4	Kansas State #	10–6	21–11	
5	Iowa State	9–7	22–11	
6	Texas Tech	8–8	22–11	
7	Texas	7–9	19–14	
8	Kansas	6–10	21–13	
9	Colorado	6–10	18–16	
10	Missouri	5–11	13–18	
11	Oklahoma State	4–12	17–15	
12	Nebraska	3–13	13–18	
‡ – Big 12 Conference regular season champions, and tournament No. 1 seed. # – Received a single-bye in the conference tournament. Overall records include all games played in the Big 12 Conference tournament.

== Schedule ==
Session	Game	Time	Matchup	Television	Attendance
First round – Tuesday, March 8
1	1	11:00 am	#8 Kansas 71 vs #9 Colorado 45	Metro Sports	4,415
1	2	1:30 pm	#5 Iowa State 69 vs #12 Nebraska 61	Metro Sports	4,415
2	3	5:00 pm	#7 Texas 79 vs #10 Missouri 66	Metro Sports	3,257
2	4	7:30 pm	#6 Texas Tech 75 vs #11 Oklahoma State 52	Metro Sports	3,257
Quarterfinals – Wednesday, March 9
3	5	11:00 am	#1 Baylor 86 vs #8 Kansas 51	FSN	4,584
3	6	1:30 pm	#4 Kansas State 56 vs #5 Iowa State 53	FSN	4,584
4	7	5:00 pm	#2 Texas A&M 77 vs #7 Texas 50	FSN	4,042
4	8	7:30 pm	#3 Oklahoma 71 vs #6 Texas Tech 69	FSN	4,042
Semifinals – Thursday, March 10
5	9	12:00 pm	#1 Baylor 86 vs #4 Kansas State 53	FSN	4,852
5	10	2:30 pm	#2 Texas A&M 81 vs #3 Oklahoma 68	FSN	4,852
Final – Friday, March 11
6	11	11:00 am	#1 Baylor 61 vs #2 Texas A&M 58	FSN	4,250
Game times in CT. #-Rankings denote tournament seed

== Tournament bracket ==
- Times listed are Central Standard Time zone.

First round (March 8)
8	Kansas	71
9	Colorado	45
5	Iowa State	69
12	Nebraska	61
7	Texas	79
10	Missouri	66
6	Texas Tech	75
11	Oklahoma State	52

Quarterfinals (March 9)
1	Baylor	86
8	Kansas	51
4	Kansas State	56
5	Iowa State	53
2	Texas A&M	77
7	Texas	50
3	Oklahoma	71
6	Texas Tech	69

Semifinals (March 11)
1	Baylor	86
4	Kansas State	53
2	Texas A&M	81
3	Oklahoma	68

Championship (March 12)
1	Baylor	61
2	Texas A&M	58

== All-Tournament team ==
Most Outstanding Player – Brittney Griner, Baylor

Player	Team
Brittney Griner	Baylor
Melissa Jones	Baylor
Danielle Robinson	Oklahoma
Danielle Adams	Texas A&M
Tyra White	Texas A&M

== See also ==
- 2011 Big 12 Conference men's basketball tournament
- 2011 NCAA Women's Division I Basketball Tournament
- 2010–11 NCAA Division I women's basketball rankings
