= 2010–11 Texas A&M Aggies women's basketball team =

Intercollegiate basketball season

2010–11 Texas A&M Aggies women's basketball

NCAA tournament National Champions
- Conference: Big 12 Conference
- Record: 33–5 (13–3 Big 12)
- Head coach: Gary Blair
- Assistant coach: Vic Schaefer
- Home arena: Reed Arena

2010–11 Big 12 women's basketball standings
	Conf.				Overall
Team	W		L	PCT	W		L	PCT
#3 Baylor†	15	–	1	.938	34	–	3	.919
#8 Texas A&M	13	–	3	.813	33	–	5	.868
#21 Oklahoma	10	–	6	.625	23	–	12	.657
Kansas State	10	–	6	.625	21	–	11	.656
Iowa State	9	–	7	.563	22	–	11	.667
Texas Tech	8	–	8	.500	22	–	11	.667
Texas	7	–	9	.438	19	–	14	.576
Kansas	6	–	10	.375	21	–	13	.618
Colorado	6	–	10	.375	18	–	16	.529
Missouri	5	–	11	.313	13	–	18	.419
Oklahoma State	4	–	17	.190	15	–	11	.577
Nebraska	3	–	13	.188	13	–	18	.419
† 2011 Big 12 Tournament winner As of April 4, 2011; Rankings from AP Poll

The 2010–11 Texas A&M Aggies women's basketball team represented Texas A&M University in the 2010–2011 NCAA Division I women's basketball season. The Aggies were coached by Gary Blair. They won the 2011 NCAA Division I women's basketball tournament, the first national title for the school in women's basketball.

== Roster ==
2010–11 Texas A&M Aggies women's basketball team
Players
Coaches

Pos.	#	Name	Height	Year	Previous school	Hometown
G	1	Catherine Snow	5 ft 7 in (1.7 m)	Sr	Troy	Temple, TX
C	3	Kelsey Bone	6 ft 4 in (1.93 m)	So	Dulles	Houston, TX
G	4	Sydney Carter	5 ft 6 in (1.68 m)	Jr	DeSoto	DeSoto, TX
G/F	5	Kristi Bellock	6 ft 1 in (1.85 m)	So	John Curtis Christian	St. Rose, LA
G/F	12	Cierra Windham	6 ft 0 in (1.83 m)	So	Norco	Corona, CA
G	14	Kristen Grant	5 ft 9 in (1.75 m)	Fr	Lamar	Arlington, TX
G	15	Maryann Baker	5 ft 10 in (1.78 m)	Sr	Bishop Lynch	Dallas, TX
G	20	Tyra White	6 ft 0 in (1.83 m)	Jr	Hickman Mills	Kansas City, MO
F	21	Adaora Elonu	6 ft 1 in (1.85 m)	Jr	Alief Elsik	Houston, TX
F/C	23	Danielle Adams	6 ft 1 in (1.85 m)	Sr	Lee's Summit	Kansas City, MO
G	25	Skylar Collins	5 ft 9 in (1.75 m)	Jr	Cedar Hill	Cedar Hill, TX
G	32	Adrienne Pratcher	5 ft 7 in (1.7 m)	So	East	Memphis, TN
C	34	Karla Gilbert	6 ft 5 in (1.96 m)	Fr	A&M Consolidated	College Station, TX
F	40	Kelsey Assarian	6 ft 1 in (1.85 m)	Jr	Barron Collier	Naples, FL
G	51	Sydney Colson	5 ft 8 in (1.73 m)	Sr	Westside	Houston, TX

Head coach

Gary Blair (Texas Tech)

Assistant coach(es)

- Vic Schaefer (Texas A&M)
- Kelly Bond-White (Illinois)
- Johnnie Harris (Arkansas Baptist)

Legend

- (C) Team captain
- (S) Suspended
- (I) Ineligible
- (W) Walk-on
- Injured
- Current redshirt

Roster

== 2011 NCAA Tournament ==
The team advanced through the tournament, defeating number one seeds Baylor and Stanford en route to the championship against Notre Dame. The Aggies won the game 76–70.

== See also ==
- 2011 NCAA Division I women's basketball tournament
