= 2010–11 Stanford Cardinal women's basketball team =

Intercollegiate basketball season

2010–11 Stanford Cardinal women's basketball

Pacific-10 Champion Pacific-10 tournament champion

NCAA Final Four, L 62–63 vs. Texas A&M
- Conference: Pacific-10 Conference

Ranking
- Coaches: No. 2
- AP: No. 2
- Record: 33–3 (18–0 Pac-10)
- Head coach: Tara VanDerveer (25th season)
- Assistant coaches: Amy Tucker Associate Head Coach (26th season); Bobbie Kelsey Assistant Coach (4th season); Kate Paye Assistant Coach (4th season)
- Home arena: Maples Pavilion

The 2010–11 Stanford Cardinal women's basketball team represented Stanford University in the 2010–11 NCAA Division I women's basketball season. The Cardinal, coached by Tara VanDerveer, and a member of the Pacific-10 Conference, won the conference's regular-season and tournament titles and advanced to the Final Four of the 2011 NCAA Division I women's basketball tournament.

== Schedule ==
Date time, TV	Rank^{#}	Opponent^{#}	Result	Record	Site city, state
Pre-Season Schedule
November 6* no	No. 3	Vanguard	W 116–65		Maples Pavilion; Stanford, California
November 9* no	No. 3	UC San Diego	W 100–52		Maples Pavilion; Stanford, California
Non-conference regular season Schedule
November 14* no	No. 3	Rutgers	W 63–50	1–0	Maples Pavilion; Stanford, California
November 19* no	No. 3	at Utah	W 62–53	2–0	Jon M. Huntsman Center; Salt Lake City, Utah
November 21* no	No. 3	at Gonzaga	W 84–78	3–0	McCarthey Athletic Center; Spokane, Washington
November 26* no	No. 3	South Carolina	W 70–32	4–0	Maples Pavilion; Stanford, California
November 28* no	No. 2	No. 16 Texas	W 93–78	5–0	Maples Pavilion; Stanford, California
December 12* no	No. 3	Fresno State	W 77–40	6–0	Maples Pavilion; Stanford, California
December 16* no	No. 3	at DePaul	L 71–91	6–1	McGrath–Phillips Arena; Chicago, Illinois
December 19* no	No. 3	at Tennessee; Rivalry	L 72–82	6–2	Thompson–Boling Arena; Knoxville, Tennessee
December 22* no	No. 8	at San Francisco	W 100–45	7–2	War Memorial Gymnasium; San Francisco, California
December 28* no	No. 9	Xavier	W 89–52	8–2	Maples Pavilion; Stanford, California
December 30* no	No. 9	No. 1 Connecticut	W 71–59	9–2	Maples Pavilion; Stanford, California
Pacific-10 Conference regular season Schedule
January 2 no	No. 9	at California	W 78–45	10–2 (1–0 Pac-10)	Haas Pavilion; Berkeley, California
January 6 no	No. 4	Arizona	W 87–54	11–2 (2–0 Pac-10)	Maples Pavilion; Stanford, California
January 8 no	No. 4	Arizona State	W 82–35	12–2 (3–0 Pac-10)	Maples Pavilion; Stanford, California
January 14 no	No. 4	at Washington	W 80–51	13–2 (4–0 Pac-10)	Bank of America Arena; Seattle, Washington
January 16 no	No. 4	at Washington State	W 94–50	14–2 (5–0 Pac-10)	Beasley Coliseum; Pullman, Washington
January 20 no	No. 4	No. 8 UCLA	W 64–38	15–2 (6–0 Pac-10)	Maples Pavilion; Stanford, California
January 22 no	No. 4	USC	W 95–51	16–2 (7–0 Pac-10)	Maples Pavilion; Stanford, California
January 27 no	No. 4	at Oregon	W 91–56	17–2 (8–0 Pac-10)	Matthew Knight Arena; Eugene, Oregon
January 29 no	No. 4	at Oregon State	W 74–44	18–2 (9–0 Pac-10)	Gill Coliseum; Corvallis, Oregon
February 3 no	No. 4	at Arizona State	W 72–54	19–2 (10–0 Pac-10)	Wells Fargo Arena; Tempe, Arizona
February 5 no	No. 4	at Arizona	W 91–61	20–2 (11–0 Pac-10)	McKale Center; Tucson, Arizona
February 10 no	No. 3	Washington State	W 100–59	21–2 (12–0 Pac-10)	Maples Pavilion; Stanford, California
February 12 no	No. 3	Washington	W 62–52	22–2 (13–0 Pac-10)	Maples Pavilion; Stanford, California
February 18 no	No. 3	at USC	W 78–64	23–2 (14–0 Pac-10)	Galen Center; Los Angeles, California
February 20 no	No. 3	at No. 9 UCLA	W 67–53	24–2 (15–0 Pac-10)	Pauley Pavilion; Los Angeles, California
February 20 no	No. 2	Oregon State	W 73–37	25–2 (16–0 Pac-10)	Maples Pavilion; Stanford, California
February 26 no	No. 2	Oregon	W 99–60	26–2 (17–0 Pac-10)	Maples Pavilion; Stanford, California
March 3 no	No. 2	California	W 75–51	27–2 (18–0 Pac-10)	Maples Pavilion; Stanford, California
*Non-conference game. ^{#}Rankings from AP Poll. (#) Tournament seedings in parentheses. All times are in Pacific Time.

== Postseason ==
=== Pac-10 Basketball Tournament ===
Date time, TV	Rank^{#}	Opponent^{#}	Result	Record	Site city, state
Pacific-10 Conference tournament
March 11 no	No. 2	vs. Arizona	W 100–71	28–2	Staples Center; Los Angeles, California
March 13; 2:30 pm, no	No. 2	vs. No. 7 UCLA	W 64–55	29–2	Staples Center; Los Angeles, California
*Non-conference game. ^{#}Rankings from AP Poll. (#) Tournament seedings in parentheses. All times are in Pacific Time.

=== NCAA basketball tournament ===
Date time, TV	Rank^{#}	Opponent^{#}	Result	Record	Site city, state
NCAA tournament
March 19* no	No. 2	vs. UC Davis; First round	W 86–59	30–2	Maples Pavilion; Stanford, California
March 21* no	No. 2	vs. St. John's; Second Round	W 75–49	31–2	Maples Pavilion; Stanford, California
March 26* no	No. 2	vs. No. 14 North Carolina; Regional semifinals - Sweet Sixteen	W 72–65	32–2	McCarthey Athletic Center; Spokane, Washington
March 28*; 6:00 pm, no	No. 2	vs. No. 20 Gonzaga; Regional final - Elite Eight	W 83–60	33–2	McCarthey Athletic Center; Spokane, Washington
April 3* no	No. 2	vs. No. 8 Texas A&M; Semifinals - Final Four	L 62–63	33–3	Conseco Fieldhouse; Indianapolis, Indiana
*Non-conference game. ^{#}Rankings from AP Poll. (#) Tournament seedings in parentheses. All times are in Pacific Time.

== Team players drafted into the WNBA ==
Round	Pick	Player	WNBA club

== See also ==
- 2010–11 NCAA Division I women's basketball season
