= Brittney Griner =

American basketball player (born 1990)

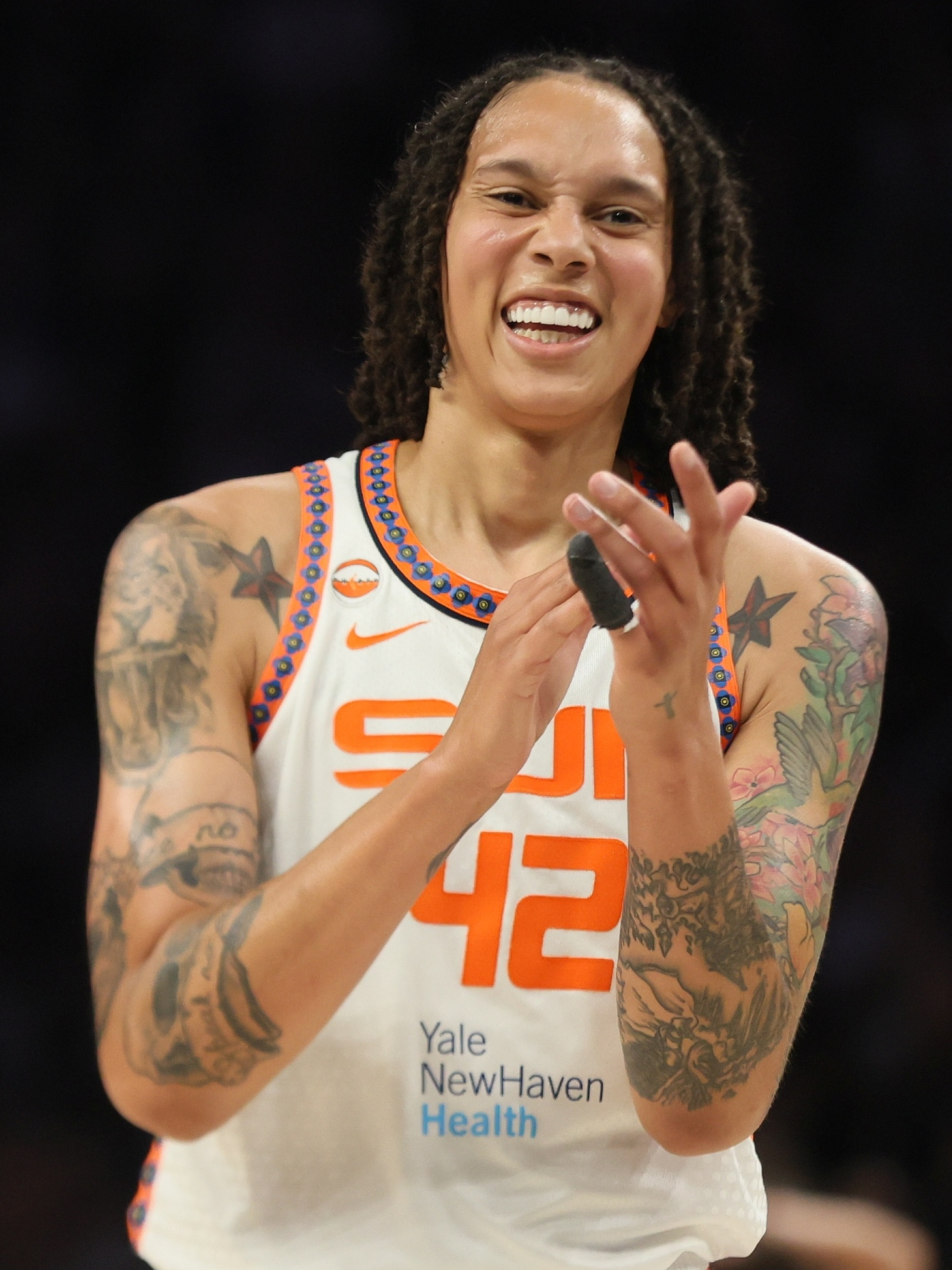
- Griner with the Connecticut Sun in 2026

Personal information
- Born: October 18, 1990 (age 36) Houston, Texas, U.S.
- Listed height: 6 ft 9 in (206 cm)
- Listed weight: 219 lb (99 kg)

Career information
- High school: Nimitz (Houston, Texas)
- College: Baylor (2009–2013)
- WNBA draft: 2013: 1st round, 1st overall pick
- Drafted by: Phoenix Mercury
- Playing career: 2013–present
- Position: Center
- Number: 42

Career history
- 2013–2024: Phoenix Mercury
- 2013–2014: Zhejiang Golden Bulls
- 2014–2015: Beijing Great Wall
- 2015–2022: UMMC Ekaterinburg
- 2025: Phantom BC
- 2025: Atlanta Dream
- 2026: Vinyl BC
- 2026: Connecticut Sun

Career highlights
- WNBA champion (2014); 10× WNBA All-Star (2013–2015, 2017–2019, 2021–2024); 2× WNBA scoring champion (2017, 2019); 8× WNBA blocks leader (2013–2019, 2021); 2× WNBA Peak Performer (2017, 2019); 3× All-WNBA First Team (2014, 2019, 2021); 3× All-WNBA Second Team (2015, 2017, 2018); 2× WNBA Defensive Player of the Year (2014, 2015); 3× WNBA All-Defensive First Team (2014, 2015, 2018); 4× WNBA All-Defensive Second Team (2016, 2017, 2019, 2021); WNBA All-Rookie Team (2013); WNBA 25th Anniversary Team (2021); 3× Russian National League champion (2015–2017); 4× EuroLeague champion (2016, 2018, 2019, 2021); Russian Cup winner (2017); NCAA champion (2012); NCAA Tournament MOP (2012); 2× Naismith College Player of the Year (2012, 2013); 2× Wade Trophy Player of the Year (2012, 2013); 2× John R. Wooden Award (2012, 2013); 2× AP Player of the Year (2012, 2013); 2× USBWA National Player of the Year (2012, 2013); Honda Sports Award (2012); Honda-Broderick Cup (2012); 3× WBCA Defensive Player of the Year (2011–2013); 3× All-American – USBWA, State Farm/WBCA Coaches' (2011–2013); 3× First-team All-American – AP (2011–2013); Second-team All-American – AP (2010); 3× Big 12 Player of the Year (2011–2013); 4× Big 12 Defensive Player of the Year (2010–2013); 3× Big 12 Tournament MOP (2011, 2012, 2013); 4× First-team All-Big 12 (2010–2013); 4× Big 12 All-Defensive Team (2010–2013); USBWA National Freshman of the Year (2010); Big 12 Freshman of the Year (2010); Big 12 All-Freshman Team (2010); McDonald's All-American (2009); WBCA High School Player of the Year (2009); Texas Miss Basketball (2009)
- Stats at WNBA.com
- Stats at Basketball Reference
Medals
Women's basketball
Representing the United States
Olympic Games
Gold medal – first place	2016 Rio de Janeiro	Team
Gold medal – first place	2020 Tokyo	Team
Gold medal – first place	2024 Paris	Team
World Cup
Gold medal – first place	2014 Turkey
Gold medal – first place	2018 Spain

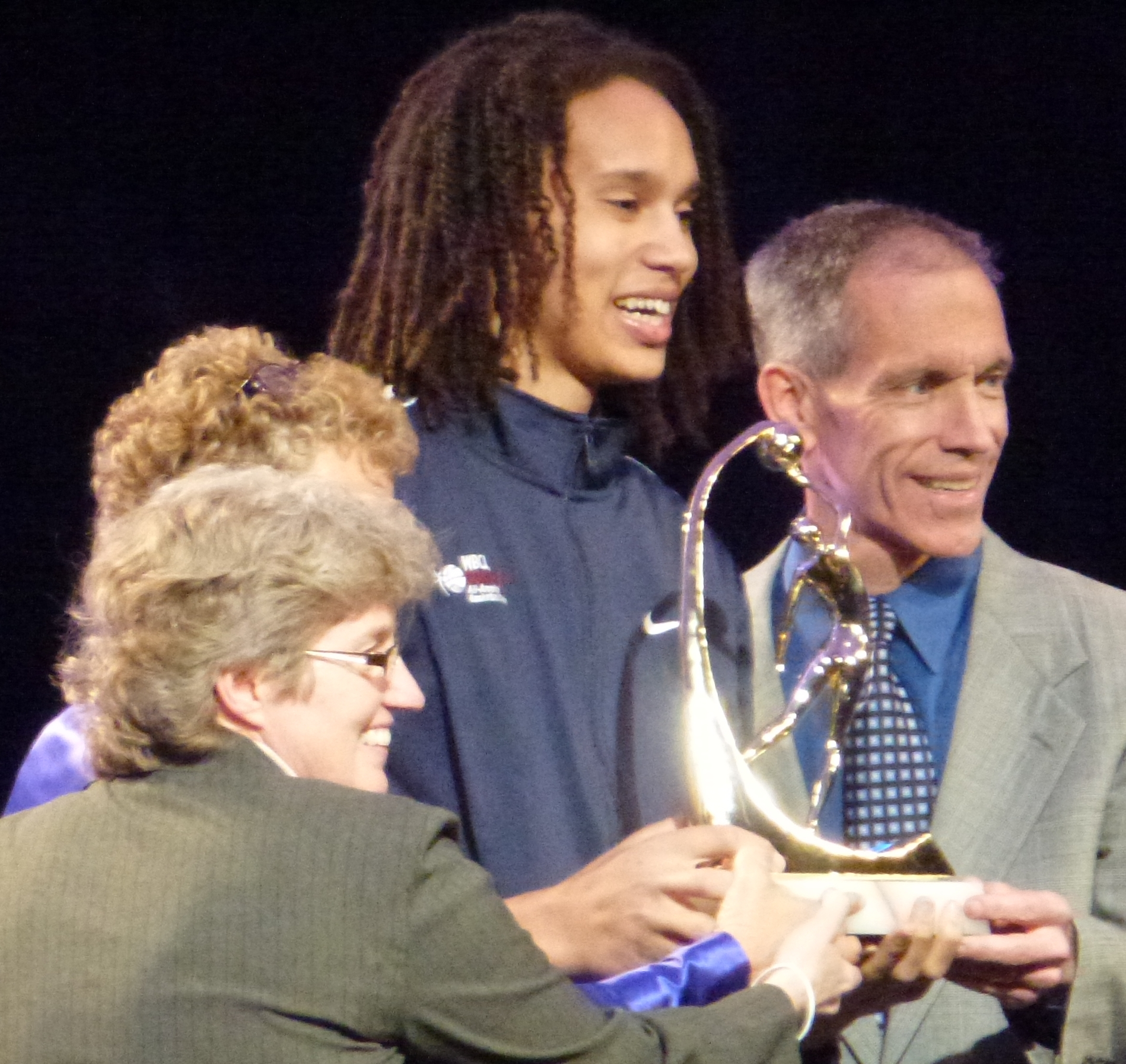
Griner accepting Wade Trophy at the WBCA Awards show in Denver Colorado 2012

Brittney Yvette Griner (/ˈɡraɪnər/; born October 18, 1990) is an American professional basketball player in the Women's National Basketball Association (WNBA) and for Unrivaled. She is a three-time Olympic gold medalist with the U.S. women's national basketball team and a six-time WNBA All-Star. Griner was named one of the 100 most influential people in the world by Time magazine in 2023.

In 2009, Griner was named the nation's No. 1 high school women's basketball player by Rivals.com. She was selected to the 2009 All-American basketball team. She played college basketball for the Baylor Lady Bears in Waco, Texas. She had a breakout junior year in 2012, as the three-time All-American was named the AP Player of the Year, the Most Outstanding Player of the Final Four, led Baylor in winning the National Championship, and won the Best Female Athlete ESPY Award. Griner is also the only NCAA basketball player to both score 2,000 points and block 500 shots.

Professionally, Griner was selected as the first overall pick in 2013 WNBA draft by the Phoenix Mercury, with whom she won the 2014 WNBA championship. Standing 6 ft 9 in (206 cm) tall, Griner wears a men's U.S. size 17 shoe and has an arm span of 87.5 in (222 cm).

Griner led the U.S. national women's basketball team to victory at the Rio Olympics in 2016. Griner was named to the national team for the 2020 Olympics (held in 2021 in Tokyo), where she won her second gold medal. She won her third consecutive gold medal with Team USA at the 2024 Olympics in France. She is also a two-time FIBA Women's World Cup winner with Team USA (2014 and 2018).

In February 2022, Griner was arrested on smuggling charges by Russian customs officials after hash oil, illegal in Russia, was found in her luggage. She had been playing basketball with the Russian Premier League during the WNBA off-season. U.S. officials stated that she was "wrongfully detained". Griner was sentenced to nine years in prison in August, but was released in December in a prisoner exchange for Russian arms dealer Viktor Bout.

== Early life ==
Griner was born October 18, 1990, in Houston, Texas, the daughter of Raymond Griner, a Harris County deputy sheriff and two-tour Vietnam War veteran, and Sandra Griner. She has three older siblings, D, Shkera and Pier.

Griner attended Nimitz High School in Houston. In addition to lettering in basketball throughout high school, she played varsity volleyball as a freshman. Starting in her sophomore year, Griner practiced with the boys' basketball team, and worked with a Nimitz football coach to develop her leg strength in preparation for learning to dunk. During her junior season, a YouTube video featuring her dunks was watched more than 6.6 million times, leading to a meeting with Shaquille O'Neal.

During her senior year, Griner led the Nimitz Cougars to the Texas 5A girls basketball state championship game, where Nimitz lost 52–43 to Mansfield Summit High School. Griner dunked 52 times in 32 games as a senior, setting a single-game record of seven dunks against Aldine High School. Houston mayor Bill White declared May 7, 2009, Brittney Griner Day. On November 11, 2008, she recorded 25 blocks in a game against Houston Alief Hastings, the most ever recorded by a female in a high school game in the U.S. In her 2008–09 season, she recorded 318 blocks, a single-season record.

Griner was named a WBCA All-American and participated in the 2009 WBCA High School All-America Game, leading the team by scoring 20 points and collecting 9 rebounds.

== College career ==
Griner played college basketball at Baylor University in Waco, Texas. As a freshman, Griner's 223 blocked shots set the all-time single-season record, establishing her as one of the greatest shot blockers in women's basketball history. On December 16, 2009, Griner recorded Baylor's first triple-double with 34 points, 13 rebounds, and Big 12 Conference record 11 blocked shots. In January 2010, she became only the seventh player to dunk during a women's college basketball game, and only the second woman to dunk twice in a single college game, making the second and third dunks of her college career in a lopsided 99–18 victory against Texas State University.

On March 3, 2010, Griner and Texas Tech player Jordan Barncastle were battling for position near the lane. As a foul was being called on Barncastle, Griner took two steps forward and threw a right-handed roundhouse punch which broke Barncastle's nose. Griner was then ejected from the game. Lady Bears coach Kim Mulkey then imposed another one-game suspension in addition to the one-game suspension mandated by NCAA rules.

Baylor entered the 2010 NCAA Tournament as a 4th seed, and knocked off top-seeded Tennessee in the Sweet 16. On March 22, Griner set an NCAA tournament record with 14 blocked shots in a 49–33 win against the Georgetown Hoyas. In the Elite Eight, Baylor defeated Duke 51–48, and Griner blocked 9 shots, totaling 35 for the tournament, a new NCAA Women's Tournament record. Duke's Alison Bales had held the previous record of 30 blocks in the 2006 NCAA Women's Tournament. Baylor reached the Final Four, before losing to eventual-champion UConn, 70–50. Griner was named an AP Second Team All-American.

As a sophomore, Griner received First Team All-American honors after averaging 23 points a game, including a career-high 40 points against Green Bay in the Sweet 16. Her sophomore season ended with a 48-56 loss to the eventual national champion and conference rival, Texas A&M University.

In her junior season, Griner averaged 23.2 points, 9.4 rebounds and 5 blocks per game. She blocked more shots than any other Division I women's team that season. Griner was named AP Player of the Year and The 2012 Premier Player of Women's College Basketball.

On April 3, 2012, Griner led Baylor with 26 points, 13 rebounds and 5 blocked shots to win the Division I Women's Basketball Championship, 80–61 over Notre Dame. Griner was named the Final Four's Most Outstanding Player. Baylor finished its undefeated season with 40 wins, the most in NCAA history.

After winning the championship on April 3, 2012, Griner decided to withdraw her candidacy for a roster spot on the 2012 U.S. Olympic women's basketball team. A month later Griner broke her wrist after jumping off her skateboard when she was going down a ramp.

Her college career came to an end in the 2013 NCAA women's basketball tournament when Baylor lost to the University of Louisville Cardinals during her senior year, in the Sweet 16. She later received her bachelor's degree in education in 2019.

== Professional career ==
=== WNBA ===
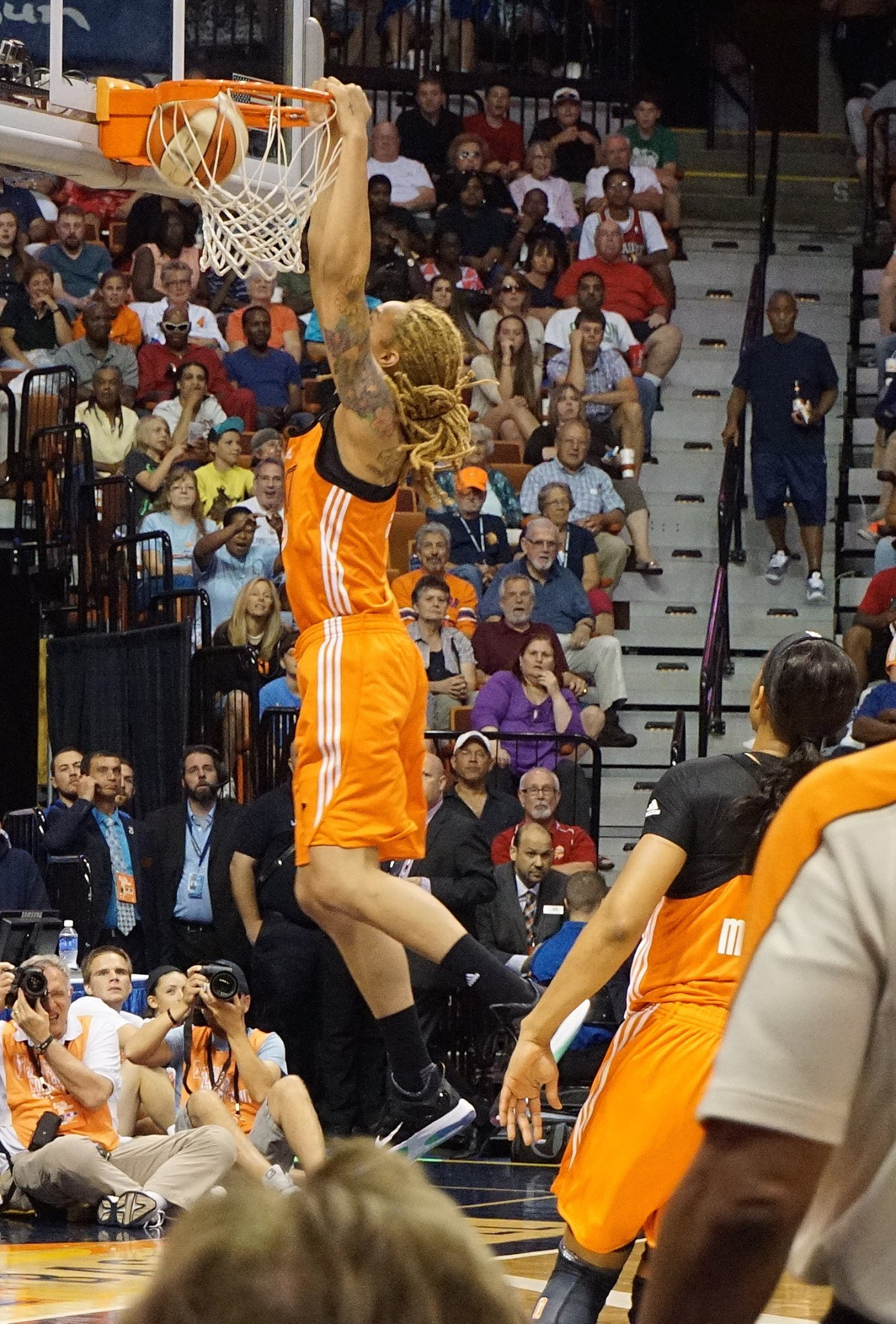
Griner dunking at the 2015 WNBA All-Star game held at the Mohegan Sun in Uncasville, Connecticut

The only female WNBA players surpassing Griner's height of 6 feet 9 inches (2.06 m), also that of fellow center Liz Cambage of Australia, have been the late Margo Dydek of Poland, at 7 feet 2 inches (2.18 m), Bernadett Határ of Hungary, at 6 feet 10.5 inches (2.096 m) and Han Xu of China at 6 feet 10 inches (2.08 m). As of 2026, this makes Griner the second-tallest active WNBA player, trailing only Han.

==== 2013 ====
In the 2013 WNBA draft, the Phoenix Mercury selected Griner as the first overall pick. In her debut on May 27, 2013, against Chicago Sky, Griner tied the WNBA dunk record, recording two dunks to equal Candace Parker's career total. She thus became the third WNBA player to dunk and first to do so twice in one game. She was a dominant defensive force in the league over the season, averaging 3.0 blocks per game. Griner was named a WNBA All-Star, but missed the 2013 WNBA All-Star Game with a right knee injury, and was replaced by Tina Thompson.

In April 2013, Dallas Mavericks owner Mark Cuban said he would consider drafting Griner to the NBA, and Griner expressed interest in the opportunity, but no offer to try out was extended by the team.

==== 2014 ====
In the 2014 season, Griner's stats would improve, as she averaged 15.6 points per game, 8.0 rebounds per game and 3.7 blocks per game. On June 29, 2014, Griner had set a WNBA record with 11 blocks in a regular season game win against the Tulsa Shock, along with 21 points and 8 rebounds. On August 24, 2014, Griner became the first WNBA player to dunk in a playoff game when she helped the Mercury defeat the Los Angeles Sparks, 93–68, at Staples Center.

The 2014 season would be a historic season for the Mercury with the combination of Brittney Griner, Diana Taurasi and Candice Dupree as the dominant Big 3 to carry the team plus the arrival of new head coach Sandy Brondello, the Mercury finished 29–5, setting the WNBA record for most wins in a regular season. They made it all the way to the WNBA finals and swept the Chicago Sky 3 games to 0, to capture the Mercury's third championship in franchise history. During the series, Griner set WNBA finals records in game 1 for most blocks in a game (8) and most blocks in a quarter (5).

==== 2015 ====
In the 2015 season, despite missing the first seven games due to a suspension stemming from her domestic violence case, Griner would have the most prolific defensive season in WNBA history, averaging a career high and WNBA record 4.0 blocks per game, surpassing Margo Dydek's record back in the 1998 season. Although the Mercury were playing without their all-star guard Diana Taurasi (who sat out the season to play overseas), the Mercury still made it to the playoffs. In the 2015 playoffs, Griner set a WNBA playoff record with 11 blocks (along with 18 points and 8 rebounds) in a game 1 victory against the Tulsa Shock, whom she also had 11 blocks against in a regular season game the year before. The Mercury advanced to the second round where they were swept by the Minnesota Lynx who won the championship that year.

==== 2016 ====
In the 2016 season, with the return of Diana Taurasi, the Mercury had a more successful playoff run. En route to the playoffs, Griner averaged 14.5 points per game, 6.5 rebounds per game and 3.1 blocks per game as the Mercury finished 16–18. During the season, Griner had recorded the sixth triple-double in WNBA history in a win against the Atlanta Dream where she had 27 points, 10 rebounds and 10 blocks. With the WNBA's new playoff format in effect, the Mercury were the number 8 seed in the league as they faced the Indiana Fever in the first round.

The Mercury upset the Fever in the first round elimination game, as Griner had 18 points, 8 rebounds and 3 blocks. In the second round elimination game, the Mercury defeated the number 3 seeded New York Liberty, Griner had 22 points 10 rebounds and 4 blocks in the win. The Mercury advanced to the semifinals (the last round before the WNBA finals) against the championship defending Minnesota Lynx in a best-of-5 series but would get swept 3–0.

==== 2017 ====
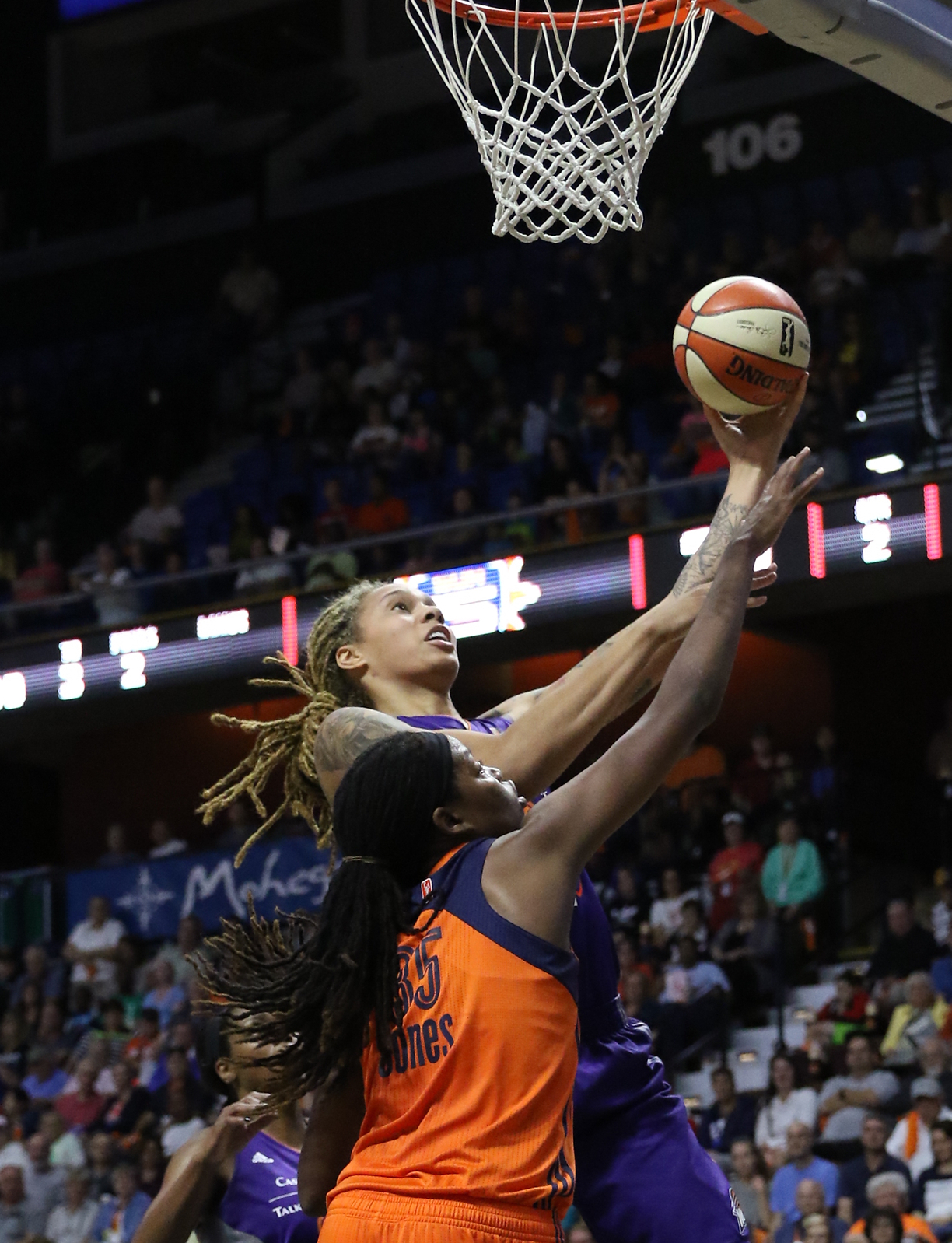
Griner performing a layup in 2017

On March 12, 2017, Griner re-signed with the Mercury to a multi-year deal once her rookie contract expired. In 2017, Griner would have the best season of her career thus far. On June 7, 2017, Griner scored a career-high 38 points along with 9 rebounds in a 98–90 overtime win against the Indiana Fever. Griner would miss 8 games of the season and the 2017 WNBA All-Star Game due to an ankle and knee injury (replaced by Rebekkah Brunson), but finished off the season leading the league in scoring with 21.9 points per game and also led the league in blocks for the fifth consecutive season.

The Mercury finished with an 18–16 record as the number 5 seed. In the first round elimination game, the Mercury defeated the Seattle Storm 79–69, advancing to the second round. Griner scored 23 points along with 11 rebounds and 3 blocks in the win. In the second round elimination game, the Mercury defeated the Connecticut Sun 88–83 and advanced to the semi-finals. Griner scored 26 points along with 9 rebounds in the win. In the semi-finals, the Mercury were eliminated by the Los Angeles Sparks in a 3-game sweep.

==== 2018 ====
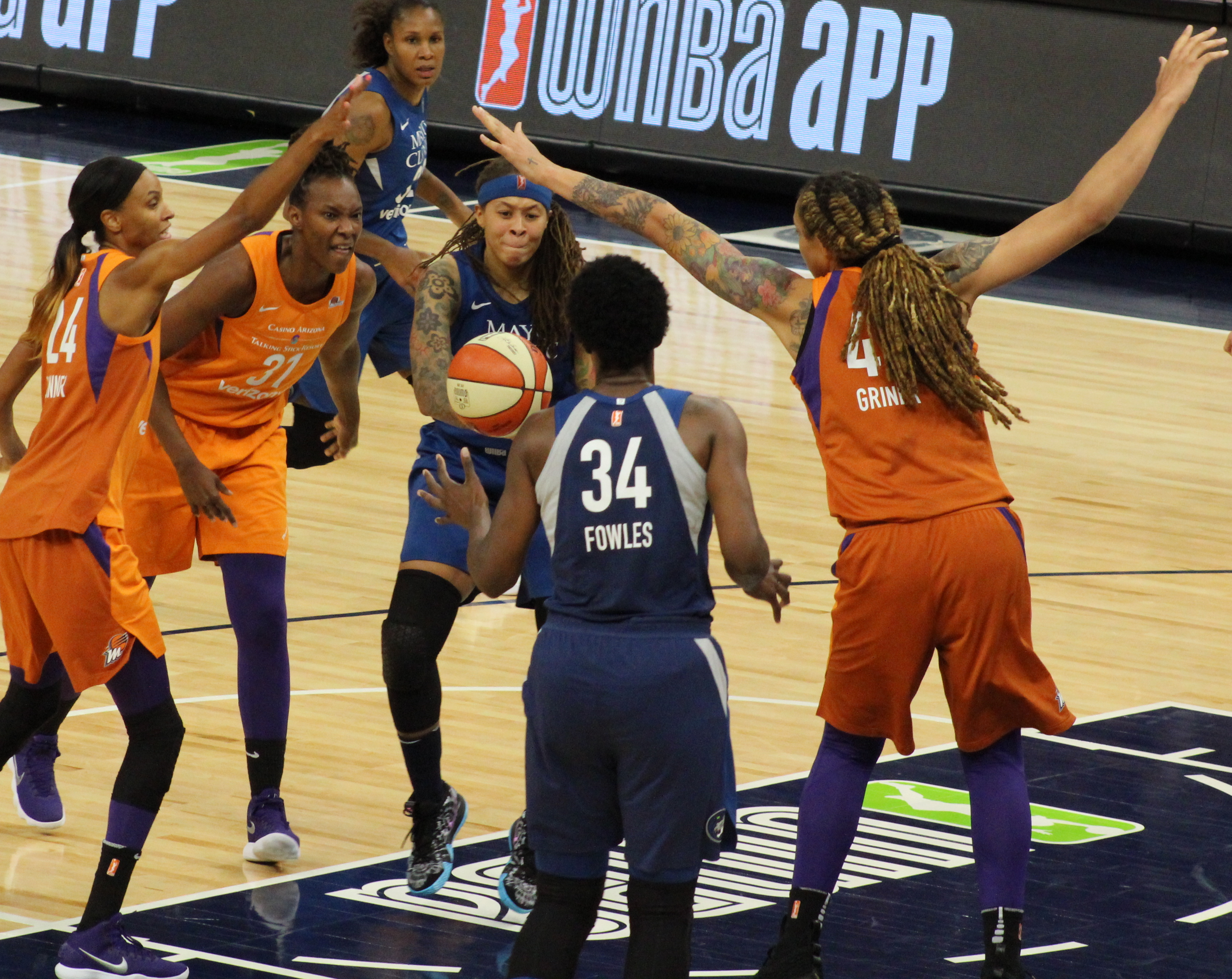
Griner and the Mercury guarding Seimone Augustus of the Minnesota Lynx in 2018

In 2018, Griner played all 34 games for the third time in her career. She was voted into the 2018 WNBA All-Star Game, making it her fifth all-star game appearance. On August 18, 2018, Griner scored a season-high 33 points along with 18 rebounds and 7 blocks in a 104–95 victory over the Atlanta Dream. This season was also her first season shooting from beyond the arc. Griner also led the league in blocks for the sixth consecutive year. The Mercury finished off the season 20–14 with the number 5 seed in the league.

In the first round elimination game, the Mercury defeated the Dallas Wings 101–83. Griner scored 17 points in the win. In the second round elimination game, the Mercury defeated the Connecticut Sun 96–86, advancing to the semi-finals for the third year in a row, they would face off against the Seattle Storm. Down 2–0, the Mercury came back to tie up the series 2–2. In game 5, the Mercury lost 94–84, ending their season.

==== 2019 ====
In 2019, Griner would be voted into the 2019 WNBA All-Star Game, making it her sixth career all-star game appearance. On August 25, 2019, Griner scored a season-high 34 points in a 94–86 loss to the Chicago Sky. By the end of the season, Griner led the league in the scoring for the second time in her career and would continue to lead the league in blocks for the seventh straight season. The Mercury finished with a 15–19 record and the number 8 seed and were eliminated 105–76 by the Chicago Sky in the first round elimination game. Griner left in the second half of the game with a knee injury.

==== 2020 ====
The 2020 season was delayed and shortened to 22 games in a bubble at IMG Academy due to the COVID-19 pandemic. After 12 games played, Griner left the bubble for undisclosed personal reasons. Without Griner, the Mercury finished 13–9 as the number 5 seed. They would make it as far as the second round where they lost to the Minnesota Lynx in the elimination game.

==== 2021 ====
In 2021 during the regular season, the Mercury were the 4th seed in the Western Conference, going 19-13, with Griner averaging 20.5 points, 9.5 rebounds, 2.7 assists, and 32.8 minutes per game in the season, while playing 30 of 36 games. She scored the most points in the playoffs, 240 points, helping the Mercury beat the New York Liberty, Seattle Storm, the first seed Las Vegas Aces and helping the Mercury reach the WNBA finals, where they lost to the Chicago Sky in 4 games.

==== 2023 ====
Griner missed the entire 2022 season because she was incarcerated on drug charges in Russia. She was released in December as part of a prisoner swap between the United States and Russia.

In 2023 Griner performed well, and was named a starter in the 2023 WNBA All-Star Game. The Mercury finished in last place with a 9-31 record. She appeared in 31 of the team's 40 games, averaging 17.5 points per game and 6.3 rebounds per game.

==== 2025 ====
It was reported on January 28, 2025 that Griner would be signing a one-year contract with the Atlanta Dream in the free agency off season.

==== 2026 ====
On April 10, 2026, Griner signed a one-year, seven-figure contract with the Connecticut Sun.

=== Overseas ===
Griner has played overseas in the WNBA off-season. In the 2013–14 off-season, she played in China for the Zhejiang Golden Bulls of the WCBA where she signed a four-month contract for $600,000, which was 12 times the amount she made in her rookie season with the Mercury. She was named as the MVP of the 2014 WCBA All-Star Game. In the 2014–15 off-season, she played in China for the Beijing Great Wall of the WCBA. Beijing Great Wall finished the season as the runner-up in the playoff.

In the 2014–15 and 2015–16 off-seasons, Griner played in Russia for UMMC Ekaterinburg with teammate Diana Taurasi, winning back-to-back championships.

In August 2016, Griner re-signed with UMMC Ekaterinburg for the 2016–17 off-season. In 2017, she re-signed once again with UMMC Ekaterinburg for the 2017–18 off-season, and in 2018, she returned to UMMC Ekaterinburg for a fifth stint in the 2018–19 off-season.

=== Unrivaled ===
On October 2, 2024, it was announced that Griner would appear and play in the inaugural season of Unrivaled, the women's 3-on-3 basketball league founded by Napheesa Collier and Breanna Stewart. She played for the Phantom in the 2025 Unrivaled season. On March 3, Griner recorded the first dunk in Unrivaled history.

On November 5, 2025, it was announced that Griner had been drafted by Vinyl BC for the 2026 Unrivaled season.

== National team career ==
In September 2011, Griner spent two weeks playing under coach Geno Auriemma for the U.S. national team as part of its European training tour. Griner was the only college player in the group. She averaged 12.8 points and 7.3 rebounds a game with the U.S. team in Europe.

Griner was the sole player still playing in college on the 2012 U.S. Olympic women's basketball team finalists roster. Excluding Griner, the average age on the finalists roster was approximately 30 years, while Griner was 22 years old at the time of the Olympics. Griner decided in April 2012 not to participate in the 2012 Olympics due to family illness and her school schedule.

In 2016, she played for the U.S. Olympic women's basketball team at the Summer Olympics and earned her first Olympic gold medal as they beat Spain 101–72 in the final, becoming one of 11 players who have earned an Olympic gold medal, FIBA World Cup gold medal, WNBA title, an NCAA title, joining Sue Bird, Swin Cash, Tamika Catchings, Cynthia Cooper, Asjha Jones, Maya Moore, Breanna Stewart, Sheryl Swoopes, Diana Taurasi, and Kara Wolters on the list.

Griner was selected for her second Olympics in 2021, going undefeated and winning the gold medal as part of Team USA.

In June 2024, Griner was again named to the US women's Olympic team to compete at the 2024 Summer Olympics in France. She contributed four points to help the United States defeat France 67–66 in the final, earning Griner her third consecutive Olympic gold medal and the United States' eighth consecutive gold medal. During the medal ceremony when the U.S. national anthem was played, Griner would get emotional at the event, thinking she wouldn't even be here again following her previous arrest in Russia back in 2022.

== Honors ==
Along with being selected as the number-one high school player in the country by Rivals.com, Griner was featured on the cover of ESPN's Rise magazine, and was selected by the Women's Basketball Coaches Association as the 2009 State Farm/WBCA High School Player of the Year. Griner also won the 2013 ESPY Award for best female college athlete. She was the 2012 winner of the Honda Sports Award for basketball and the overall Honda-Broderick Cup winner for all sports.

She was the 2012 recipient of the Wade Trophy, presented to the best female NCAA Division I basketball player who embodies the "Spirit of Margaret Wade". She was the winner of the Ann Meyers Drysdale Award, in 2012, and again in 2013. The award is given by the U.S. Basketball Writers Association to the nation's top Division I women's player.

Among other accolades, Griner is credited with bringing the women's game more attention due to her ability to dunk. She holds the NCAA record for dunks in a career with 18 total dunks. She passed Candace Parker as the all-time NCAA women's dunks leader.

- 2009—WBCA High School Coaches' All-America Team
- 2011—WBCA NCAA Division I Defensive Player of the Year
- 2012—WBCA NCAA Division I Defensive Player of the Year
- 2013—WBCA NCAA Division I Defensive Player of the Year
- 2014—FIBA World Championship All-Star Five

In 2014, Griner was included as part of The Advocate's annual "40 under 40" list.

The WNBA included Griner in The W25, a list of the best players of the league's first 25 years.

She was also named one of ESPNW's Impact 25 in 2014.

In February 2024, Baylor University retired Griner's No. 42 jersey in a ceremony preceding a game versus Texas Tech.

== Personal life and activism ==
In an interview with SI.com on February 11, 2013, Griner publicly came out as a lesbian. She also revealed in the interview that she was bullied as a child, explaining, "It's hard. Just being picked on for being different. Just being bigger, my sexuality, everything." She said she is very passionate about working with children in order to bring attention to the issue of bullying, particularly against LGBT people. Griner had previously come out to her parents in high school, which her father did not accept gracefully, forcing her to live with an assistant coach for six weeks during her senior year. She later wrote a memoir with Sue Hovey addressing bullying and self-acceptance, In My Skin: My Life On and Off the Basketball Court, published in 2014.

In a 2019 interview with People, Griner stated, "People tell me I'm going to break the barrier and trailblaze. I just kind of look at it like, I'm just trying to help out, I'm just trying to make it not as tough for the next generation." In 2013, Griner was featured on the cover of ESPN Magazine. She appeared in "The Taboo Issue". She is pictured holding a snake, which is her favorite animal because they are "misunderstood". She stated, "You just have to look at it in a different way."

Her endorsement deal with Nike was the first time the company had signed such a deal with an openly gay athlete. Griner continues to push back on traditional gender roles as she regularly models clothes branded as "menswear" for Nike. Nike spokesman Brian Strong said of signing Griner, "We can't get into specifics, but it's safe to say we jumped at the opportunity to work with her because she breaks the mold."

In 2020, Griner, along with teammate Brianna Turner, called for the WNBA to stop playing the United States national anthem before the games. She made her remarks after Mercury players refused to take the floor during a pre-season game in Bradenton, Florida. Griner said she was protesting the killing of Breonna Taylor as part of the wider George Floyd protests. She said later during a media teleconference, "I honestly feel we should not play the national anthem during our season. I think we should take that much of a stand." She said she does not believe that the national anthem should be played at sporting events.

Since her release from detention in Russia in December 2022, Griner has championed the return of others detained in foreign countries; she has also stated her experiences of being detained in a Russian jail have led her to appreciate the "uniquely American freedoms" citizens of her country take for granted or overlook. As such, she resumed standing for the national anthem beginning with the 2023 season.

On February 17, 2025, Griner cancelled a speaking engagement for a cannabis leadership summit at the Gaylord National Resort & Convention Center in National Harbor, Maryland, after a piece of duct tape with the words "Gay Baby Jail" written on it was found near her hotel room, which she perceived to be a threat. According to detectives at the Prince George's County Police Department, the words "Gay Baby Jail" was an apparent video game reference, and may have been connected to a large anime and video game convention that had recently taken place at the event center.

=== Previous marriage and disorderly conduct case ===
On August 14, 2014, Griner got engaged to fellow WNBA player Glory Johnson. On April 22, 2015, they were both arrested on charges of assault and disorderly conduct after police responded to a fight between the two in their suburban home in Phoenix, Arizona. Both had sustained minor injuries. Despite this incident, they married the following month on May 8, 2015, in Phoenix. On May 15, 2015, the WNBA suspended Griner and Johnson for seven games each after Griner pleaded guilty to disorderly conduct charges. Griner was also required to complete 26 weeks of domestic violence counseling.

On June 4, 2015, Griner and Johnson revealed that Johnson was pregnant with twins, conceived with Johnson's eggs through in vitro fertilization. The following day, and after less than a month of marriage, Griner filed for an annulment of the marriage citing fraud and duress; the annulment was denied. Johnson gave birth to twin girls on October 12, 2015, 16 weeks premature. Griner was ordered to pay child support to Johnson. The couple's divorce was finalized in June 2016.

=== Marriage ===
Griner became engaged to Cherelle Watson in August 2018, and they married in June 2019. In 2024, Griner and Watson announced a pregnancy. In July 2024, Watson gave birth to their son. In July 2026, Griner filed for divorce, citing that the marriage was "irretrievably broken" with "no hope of reconciliation."

== 2022 arrest and imprisonment in Russia ==
On February 17, 2022, Griner was arrested on drug smuggling charges in Russia. She was detained at Sheremetyevo International Airport after the Federal Customs Service found she was carrying vaporizer cartridges containing less than a gram of hash oil. In Arizona, she had been prescribed medicinal cannabis, which is illegal in Russia.

Some U.S. officials expressed concern that Russia may have been using Griner as leverage in response to the international sanctions imposed against Russia for its invasion of Ukraine. The former Pentagon official Evelyn Farkas expressed concern that Griner could be used as a "high-profile hostage" by Russia. In May 2022, the U.S. State Department stated that they had determined Griner was being "wrongfully detained". On May 15, 2022, it was reported that the United States and Russia would consider a prisoner swap, with Russia exchanging Griner for arms dealer Viktor Bout, who had served 10 years of a 25-year federal prison sentence in the United States, on charges of conspiracy to kill American citizens and officials, delivery of anti-aircraft missiles, and providing aid to a terrorist organization.

=== Trial, sentencing, imprisonment, and release ===
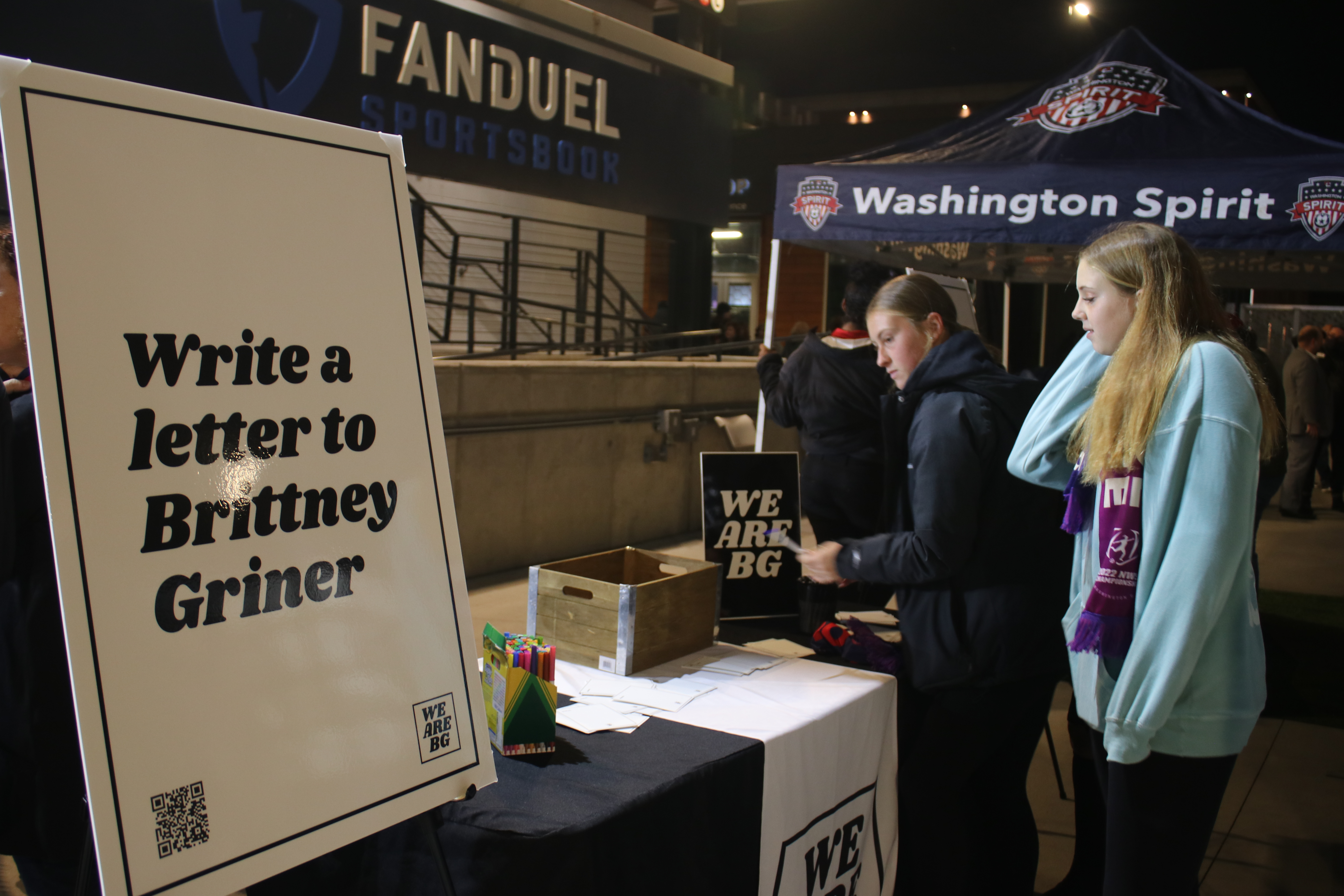
Fans at the 2022 NWSL Championship were invited to write letters to Griner.

On the second day of her trial, July 7, 2022, Griner pleaded guilty (Note: Under Russian law, Griner's guilty plea was only an admission of guilt, and did not end her trial; the court still had to prove there was sufficient evidence she committed the crime independent of her guilty plea.) but said she had no intent to break the law. She asked to give testimony to the court.

On August 4, 2022, the court found Griner guilty and sentenced her to nine years in prison and a fine of 1 million rubles (US$16,301), even though the standard sentence for possession of no more than 2 grams of hash oil is 15 days. On November 17, Griner's lawyers said that she had been transferred to IK-2, a female penal colony in the town of Yavas in the region of Mordovia. Previously, she had been held at an undisclosed location.

Griner's family enlisted the help of Bring Our Families Home to appeal for her release. On December 8, 2022, she was released by Russia in a 1-for-1 prisoner swap for Viktor Bout. At the same time as the exchange, Russia deported another American, Sarah Krivanek, detained for a domestic violence dispute.

== Career statistics ==
=== WNBA ===
Legend
GP	Games played	GS	Games started	MPG	Minutes per game	RPG	Rebounds per game
APG	Assists per game	SPG	Steals per game	BPG	Blocks per game	PPG	Points per game
TO	Turnovers per game	FG%	Field-goal percentage	3P%	3-point field-goal percentage	FT%	Free-throw percentage
**Bold**	Career best	°	League leader

†	Denotes season(s) in which Griner won a WNBA championship
‡	WNBA record

==== Regular season ====
WNBA regular season statistics
Year	Team	GP	GS	MPG	FG%	3P%	FT%	RPG	APG	SPG	BPG	TO	PPG
2013	Phoenix	27	27	25.9	.556	—	.724	6.3	1.0	0.4	3.0°	1.7	14.5
2014^{†}	Phoenix	34	**34**	30.7	.578	—	.802	8.0	1.6	0.6	3.7°	1.9	15.6
2015	Phoenix	26	26	30.7	.565	—	.773	8.1	1.3	0.3	**4.0**‡	2.1	15.1
2016	Phoenix	34	**34**	29.2	.548	—	.831	6.5	1.0	0.3	3.1°	2.0	14.5
2017	Phoenix	26	26	31.5	.577	—	.812	7.6	1.9	0.6	2.5°	2.4	**21.9**
2018	Phoenix	34	**34**	32.6	.544	.250	.800	7.7	2.1	0.5	2.6°	2.3	20.5
2019	Phoenix	31	31	**32.8**	.564	.333	.808	7.2	2.4	**0.7**	2.0°	2.4	20.7°
2020	Phoenix	12	12	31.8	.497	.000	.809	7.5	**3.0**	0.3	1.8	2.5	17.7
2021	Phoenix	30	30	**32.8**	.575	.444	**.846**	**9.5**	2.7	0.4	1.9°	2.2	20.5
2022	Did not appear in league (detained abroad)												
2023	Phoenix	31	31	27.6	**.579**°	.111	.772	6.3	2.2	0.5	1.6	2.1	17.5
2024	Phoenix	30	30	28.7	**.579**°	**.500**	.777	6.6	2.3	0.5	1.5	1.8	17.8
2025	Atlanta	**39**	25	20.8	.518	.263	.765	5.2	0.8	0.1	1.2	**1.5**	9.8
2026	Connecticut	18	18	25.3	.527	.250	.672	5.8	2.5	0.4	1.8	1.8	13.2
**Career**	13 years, 3 teams	372	358	29.1	.557	.328	.792	7.1	1.8	0.5	2.4	2.1	16.6
**Career**	All-Star	7	5	15.5	.593	.176	.500	7.1	0.9	0.3	1.4	0.9	15.1

==== Playoffs ====
WNBA playoff statistics
Year	Team	GP	GS	MPG	FG%	3P%	FT%	RPG	APG	SPG	BPG	TO	PPG
2013	Phoenix	5	5	26.6	.533	—	.556	6.4	0.2	0.2	0.8	1.6	10.6
2014^{†}	Phoenix	7	7	31.0	.627	—	**.920**	6.0	1.6	0.4	3.4°	1.8	16.7
2015	Phoenix	4	4	29.7	.583	—	.885	8.0	1.3	**0.7**	**4.5**°	2.0	16.3
2016	Phoenix	5	5	31.2	**.643**	—	.813	6.0	1.6	0.6	2.2	2.2	13.4
2017	Phoenix	5	5	**36.8**	.407	—	.795	7.0	2.0	0.6	1.6	2.4	20.2
2018	Phoenix	7	7	36.4	.631	—	.750	8.0	**3.1**	**0.7**	2.2	1.7	21.6
2019	Phoenix	1	1	13.8	.375	—	—	3.0	0.0	0.0	1.0	1.0	6.0
2021	Phoenix	**11**	**11**	35.1	.562	.000	.800	**8.4**	3.0	0.4	1.6	2.1	**21.8**
2024	Phoenix	2	2	29.5	.520	**.500**	.700	5.5	0.0	0.5	2.0	2.0	17.0
2025	Atlanta	3	0	10.7	.400	.000	.667	1.0	1.3	0.0	0.3	**0.7**	4.7
**Career**	10 years, 2 teams	50	47	31.1	.556	.167	.801	6.7	1.9	0.5	2.1	1.9	17.0

=== College ===
†	NCAA championship
‡	NCAA record

Year	Team	GP	GS	MPG	FG%	3P%	FT%	RPG	APG	SPG	BPG	TO	PPG
2009–10	Baylor	35	35	33.5	.503	.000	.684	8.5	1.0	0.5	6.4	2.8	18.4
2010–11	Baylor	37	37	31.8	.543	.500	.777	7.8	1.4	0.4	4.6	2.1	23.0
2011–12†	Baylor	40	40	32.7	.609	.500	.800	9.5	1.6	0.6	5.2	1.7	23.2
2012–13	Baylor	36	36	30.3	.607	.000	.712	9.4	2.4	0.7	4.1	1.9	23.8
Career		148	148	32.0	.569	.400	.747	8.8	1.6	0.5	5.1	1.4	22.2

Year	Rebounds		Blocks		Points		Notable stats.
Year	Total	Season high	Total	Season high	Total	Season high	Notable stats.
2009–10	297	21	223‡	14	644	34	‡NCAA record for blocks in a season
2010–11	290	15	170	10	852	40	
2011–12†	379	15	206	9	929	45	
2012–13	339	15	149	7	858	50	
Career	1,305		748‡		3,283		‡NCAA record for career blocks (men and women)

== Books ==
- Griner, Brittney; Hovey, Sue (April 8, 2014). In My Skin: My Life On and Off the Basketball Court. New York: Dey Street Books (HarperCollins). ISBN 9780062309341. OCLC 858354857. Archived from the original on August 21, 2014.
- Griner, Brittney; Burford, Michelle (May 7, 2024). Coming Home. New York: Alfred A. Knopf. ISBN 9780593801345. OCLC 1428734880. Archived from the original on May 4, 2024.

== See also ==
- List of NCAA Division I basketball career triple-doubles leaders
- List of American people imprisoned in Russia

== Notes ==
Awards and achievements
Preceded by Lindsey Vonn	Best Female Athlete ESPY Award; 2012	Succeeded by Serena Williams
