= WBCA Defensive Player of the Year =

- Awarded for: The best female Division I defensive basketball player in the United States
- Country: United States
- Presented by: WBCA
- First award: 2007
- Currently held by: Lauren Betts, UCLA
- Website: Official website

The WBCA NCAA Division I Defensive Player of the Year is awarded by the Women's Basketball Coaches Association to the best defensive player in NCAA Division I women's basketball. The winner is selected from among the winners of the defensive player of the year award for each individual conference. If any individual conference does not have such an award, the conference can nominate a player to be considered for the countrywide award. The award has been given annually since 2007 and is chosen by a WBCA selection committee.

== Winners ==
Season	Player	School	Source(s)
2006–07	Lindsey Harding	Duke	
2007–08	Sylvia Fowles	LSU	
2008–09	Jennifer Risper	Vanderbilt	
2009–10	Monica Wright	Virginia	
2010–11	Brittney Griner	Baylor	
2011–12	Brittney Griner (2)	Baylor	
2012–13	Brittney Griner (3)	Baylor	
2013–14	Stefanie Dolson	UConn	
2014–15	Elizabeth Williams	Duke	
2015–16	Moriah Jefferson	UConn	
2016–17	Gabby Williams	UConn	
2017–18	Kia Nurse	UConn	
2018–19	Teaira McCowan	Mississippi State	
2019–20	DiDi Richards	Baylor	
2020–21	Natasha Mack	Oklahoma State	
2021–22	Veronica Burton	Northwestern	
2022–23	Cameron Brink	Stanford	
2023–24	Kamilla Cardoso	South Carolina	
2024–25	Lauren Betts	UCLA	
2025–26	Hannah Hidalgo	Notre Dame	

== See also ==
- List of sports awards honoring women
