= Baylor Bears women's basketball =

Women's college basketball team

Baylor Bears
2026–27 Baylor Bears women's basketball team
- University: Baylor University
- First season: 1974 (51 years ago)
- Head coach: Nicki Collen (6th season)
- Location: Waco, Texas
- Arena: Foster Pavilion (capacity: 7,500)
- Conference: Big 12 Conference
- Nickname: Bears
- Colors: Green and gold

NCAA Division I tournament champions
- 2005, 2012, 2019
Other NCAA Division I tournament results
Final Four	2005, 2010, 2012, 2019
Elite Eight	2005, 2010, 2011, 2012, 2014, 2015, 2016, 2017, 2019, 2021
Sweet Sixteen	2004, 2005, 2006, 2009, 2010, 2011, 2012, 2013, 2014, 2015, 2016, 2017, 2018, 2019, 2021, 2024
Appearances	2001, 2002, 2004, 2005, 2006, 2007, 2008, 2009, 2010, 2011, 2012, 2013, 2014, 2015, 2016, 2017, 2018, 2019, 2021, 2022, 2023, 2024, 2025, 2026

AIAW tournament quarterfinals
- 1976, 1977
Other AIAW tournament results
Second round	1976, 1977
Appearances	1976, 1977

Conference tournament champions
- 2005, 2009, 2011, 2012, 2013, 2014, 2015, 2016, 2018, 2019, 2021

Conference regular-season champions
- 2005, 2011, 2012, 2013, 2014, 2015, 2016, 2017, 2018, 2019, 2020, 2021, 2022

Uniforms
Home	Away	Alternate

The Baylor Bears women's basketball team represents Baylor University in Waco, Texas, in NCAA Division I women's basketball competition. They currently compete in the Big 12 Conference. The team plays its home games in the Foster Pavilion. Before the 2021–22 season, the team had been known as the "Lady Bears", but on September 3, 2021, the school officially announced that women's basketball had dropped "Lady" from its nickname. At the same time, soccer and volleyball, the other two Baylor women's teams that were still using "Lady" in their nicknames, also abandoned that usage.

The then-Lady Bears went undefeated at 40–0 to become the 2012 NCAA Division I National Champions in Women's College Basketball.

== History ==
=== Olga Fallen years (1974–1979) ===
Olga joined the faculty of Baylor University in 1956 and served as an assistant professor of physical education through 1997. She developed Baylor's women's athletic program from its beginning within the physical education department in 1959 and from 1972 to 1979, served as the coordinator of women's athletics. She was inducted into the Baylor Athletic Hall of Fame in 1999. Under her coaching the softball team, advanced to the AIAW regional tournament in 1978 and 1979. The Bearette basketball team posted a five-year record of 143–50 and earned two consecutive bids to the national AIAW tournament in 1976 and 1977, rated fifth and seventh in the nation those years.

=== Sonja Hogg years (1994–2000) ===
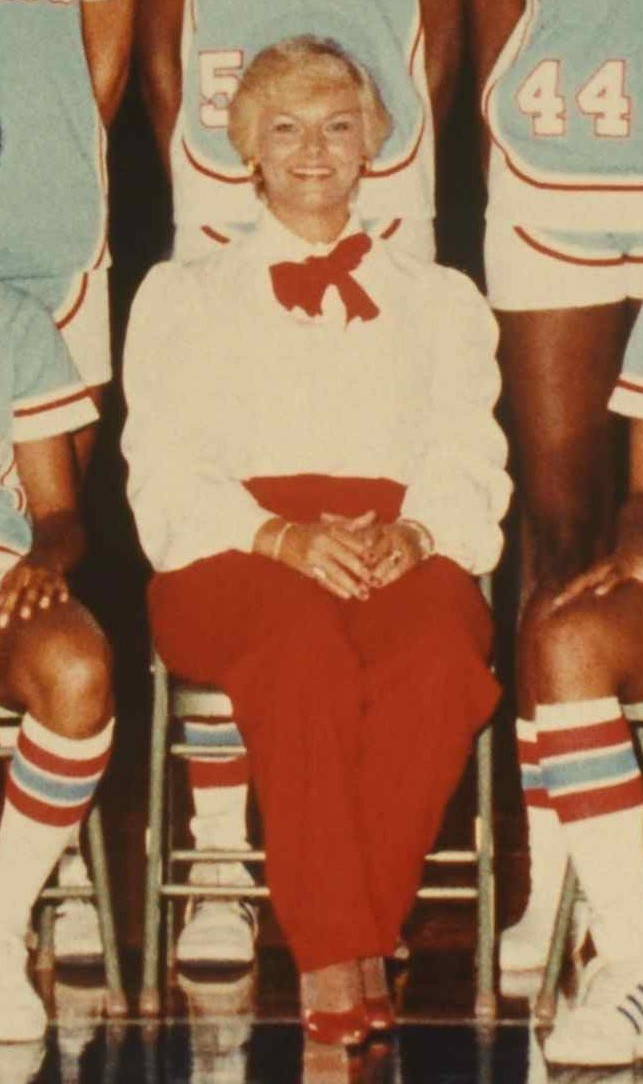
Sonja Hogg

Record table
Season	Team	Overall	Conference	Standing	Postseason
Baylor Lady Bears (Southwest Conference) (1994–1996)
1994–1995	Baylor	13–14	4–10	7th	
1995–1996	Baylor	11–19	3–11	7th	
Baylor Lady Bears (Big 12 Conference) (1996–2000)
1996–1997	Baylor	15–13	7–9	T-8th	
1997–1998	Baylor	20–11	10–6	T–5th	WNIT Finals
1998–1999	Baylor	17–14	8–8	T-5th	WNIT
1999–2000	Baylor	7–20	2–14	12th	
Baylor:		83–91 (.477)	34–58 (.370)		
Total:		83–91 (.477)			
National champion Postseason invitational champion Conference regular season champion Conference regular season and conference tournament champion Division regular season champion Division regular season and conference tournament champion Conference tournament champion

=== Kim Mulkey years (2000–2021) ===
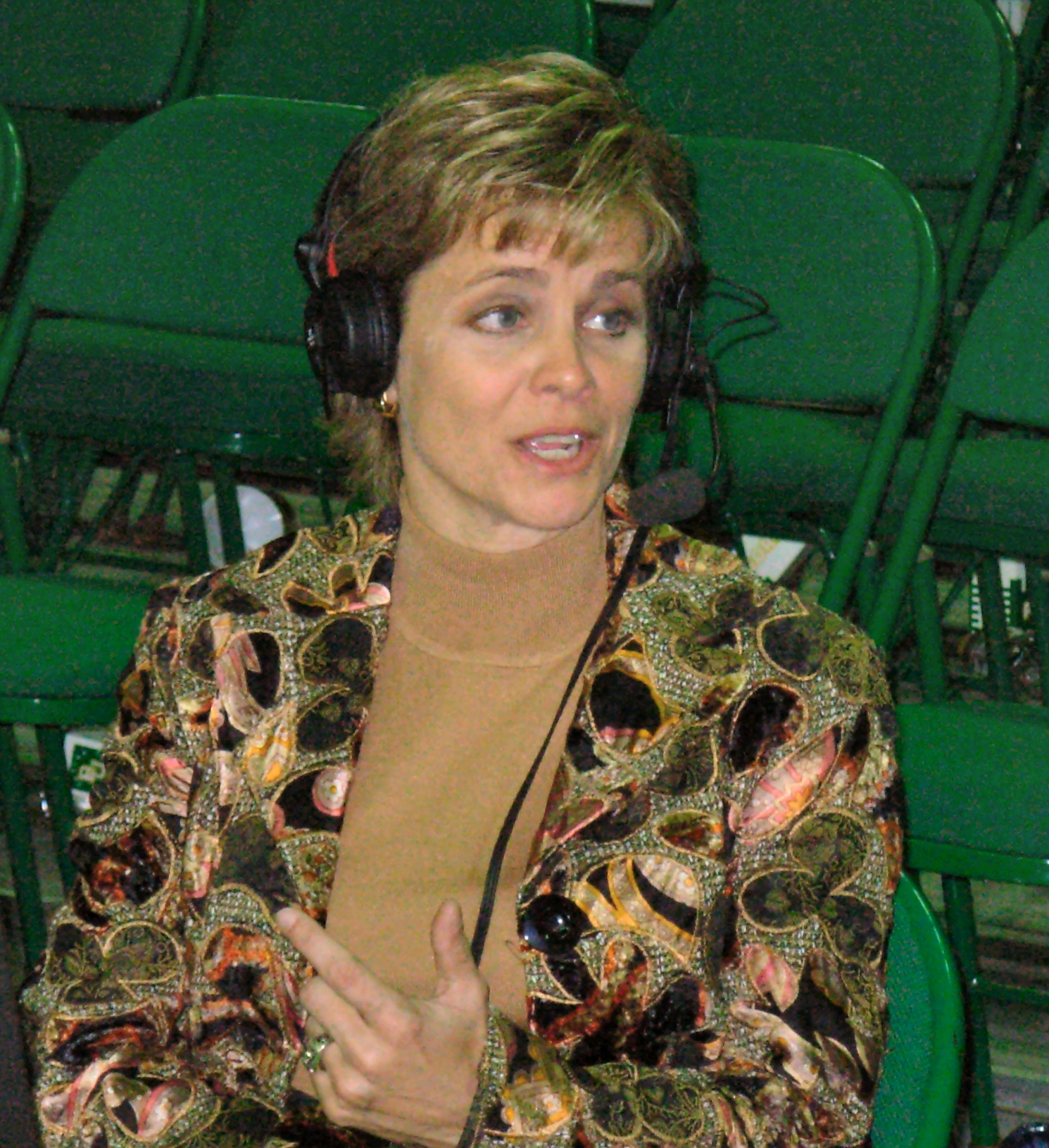
Kim Mulkey

In 2000, Kim Mulkey took over a Baylor program that had made the WNIT Finals in 1998 and made a return trip to the WNIT in 1999. In her first season at Baylor she led the Lady Bears program to its first NCAA tournament bid. The Lady Bears have now (as of 2019) put together 19 consecutive 20-win seasons and only once has the team lost more than 10 games in a season. The rise of the Baylor program under Mulkey was capped off in 2005 with a national title. This made her the fourth person to have won NCAA Division I basketball titles as a player and a head coach (after Joe B. Hall, Bob Knight and Dean Smith) and the first woman to do so. The Lady Bears also captured the 2012 title with an undefeated season and the 2019 title. Mulkey departed the program for LSU in 2021.

Record table
Season	Team	Overall	Conference	Standing	Postseason
Baylor Lady Bears (Big 12 Conference) (2000–2021)
2000–2001	Baylor	21–9	9–7	6th	NCAA First Round
2001–2002	Baylor	27–6	12–4	2nd	NCAA Second Round
2002–2003	Baylor	24–11	8–8	7th	WNIT Runner-up
2003–2004	Baylor	26–9	10–6	T–4th	NCAA Sweet Sixteen
2004–2005	Baylor	33–3	14–2	1st	NCAA Champions
2005–2006	Baylor	26–7	12–4	2nd	NCAA Sweet Sixteen
2006–2007	Baylor	26–8	11–5	3rd	NCAA Second Round
2007–2008	Baylor	25–7	12–4	2nd	NCAA Second Round
2008–2009	Baylor	29–6	12–4	2nd	NCAA Sweet Sixteen
2009–2010	Baylor	27–10	9–7	6th	NCAA Final Four
2010–2011	Baylor	34–3	15–1	1st	NCAA Elite Eight
2011–2012	Baylor	40–0	18–0	1st	NCAA Champions
2012–2013	Baylor	34–2	18–0	1st	NCAA Sweet Sixteen
2013–2014	Baylor	32–5	16–2	1st	NCAA Elite Eight
2014–2015	Baylor	33–4	16–2	1st	NCAA Elite Eight
2015–2016	Baylor	36–2	17–1	1st	NCAA Elite Eight
2016–2017	Baylor	33–4	17–1	1st	NCAA Elite Eight
2017–2018	Baylor	33–2	18–0	1st	NCAA Sweet Sixteen
2018–2019	Baylor	37–1	18–0	1st	NCAA Champions
2019–2020	Baylor	28–2	17–1	1st	tournament canceled
2020–2021	Baylor	28–3	17–1	1st	NCAA Elite Eight
Baylor:		632–104 (.859)	296–60 (.831)		
Total:		632–104			
National champion Postseason invitational champion Conference regular season champion Conference regular season and conference tournament champion Division regular season champion Division regular season and conference tournament champion Conference tournament champion

=== Nicki Collen era (2021–present) ===
Nicki Collen, previously 2018 WNBA Coach of the Year WNBA's Atlanta Dream, replaced Mulkey as head coach after the latter's departure for LSU.

Record table
Season	Team	Overall	Conference	Standing	Postseason
Baylor Bears (Big 12 Conference) (2021–present)
2021–22	Baylor	28–7	15–3	1st	NCAA Second Round
2022–23	Baylor	20–13	10–8	T–4th	NCAA Second Round
2023–24	Baylor	26–8	12–6	T-4th	NCAA Sweet Sixteen
2024–25	Baylor	28–8	15–3	2nd	NCAA Second Round
2025–26	Baylor	25-9	13-5	3rd	NCAA Second Round
Baylor:		127-45 (.756)	65–25 (.741)		
Total:		127-45			
National champion Postseason invitational champion Conference regular season champion Conference regular season and conference tournament champion Division regular season champion Division regular season and conference tournament champion Conference tournament champion

=== National Championships ===
Year	Coach	Opponent	Score	Record
2005	Kim Mulkey	Michigan St. Spartans	84–62	33–3
2012	Kim Mulkey	Notre Dame Fighting Irish	80–61	40–0
2019	Kim Mulkey	Notre Dame Fighting Irish	82–81	37–1
National Championships			3	

=== Conference Championships ===
Year	Overall Record	Conference Record	Coach	Conference
2005	33–3	14–2	Kim Mulkey	Big 12 Conference
2011	34–3	15–1	Kim Mulkey	Big 12 Conference
2012	40–0	18–0	Kim Mulkey	Big 12 Conference
2013	34–2	18–0	Kim Mulkey	Big 12 Conference
2014	32–5	16–2	Kim Mulkey	Big 12 Conference
2015	33–4	16–2	Kim Mulkey	Big 12 Conference
2016	36–2	17–1	Kim Mulkey	Big 12 Conference
2017	33–4	16–2	Kim Mulkey	Big 12 Conference
2018	33–2	18–0	Kim Mulkey	Big 12 Conference
2019	37–1	18–0	Kim Mulkey	Big 12 Conference
2020	28–2	17–1	Kim Mulkey	Big 12 Conference
2021	28–3	17–1	Kim Mulkey	Big 12 Conference
2022	28–7	15–3	Nicki Collen	Big 12 Conference
Totals	13			

== Conference honors and awards ==
Southwest Conference Player of the Year

- Mary Lowry (1993–94)

Big 12 Coach of the Year

- Kim Mulkey (2005, 2011, 2012, 2013, 2015, 2018, 2019)

Big 12 Player of the Year

- Sophia Young (2005)
- Brittney Griner (2011, 2012, 2013)
- Odyssey Sims (2014)
- Nina Davis (2015)
- Kalani Brown (2018)
- NaLyssa Smith (2021, 2022)

Big 12 Freshman of the Year

- Brittney Griner (2010)
- Odyssey Sims (2011)
- Nina Davis (2014)
- Darianna Littlepage-Buggs (2023)

Big 12 Newcomer of the Year

- Nicole Palmer (1997)
- Sheila Lambert (2001)
- Bernice Mosby (2007)
- Destiny Williams (2011)
- Alexis Jones (2016)
- Te'a Cooper (2020)
- DiJonai Carrington (2021)
- Jordan Lewis (2022)

Big 12 Defensive Player of the Year

- Abiola Wabara (2006)
- Brittney Griner (2010, 2011, 2012, 2013)
- Odyssey Sims (2014)
- Lauren Cox (2018, 2019)
- DiDi Richards (2020)

Big 12 Sixth Woman Award

- Melissa Jones (2009)
- Destiny Williams (2013)
- Khadijiah Cave (2015)
- Lauren Cox (2017)
- Queen Egbo (2020)
- DiJonai Carrington (2021)

Big 12 Tournament Most Outstanding Player

- Sophia Young (2005)
- Jessica Morrow (2009)
- Brittney Griner (2011, 2012, 2013)
- Nina Davis (2014, 2015)
- Alexis Jones (2016)
- Kalani Brown (2018, 2019)
- NaLyssa Smith (2021)

== National honors and awards ==
USBWA National Freshman of the Year

- Brittney Griner – 2009–10
- Odyssey Sims – 2010–11

Elite 90 Award

- Lindsay Palmer – 2010, 2012

Wade Trophy

- Brittney Griner – 2011–12, 2012–13
- Odyssey Sims – 2013–14
- NaLyssa Smith – 2020–21

Naismith College Player of the Year

- Brittney Griner – 2011–12, 2012–13

Frances Pomeroy Naismith Award

- Sheila Lambert – 2001–02
- Odyssey Sims – 2013–14

WBCA Defensive Player of the Year

- Brittney Griner – 2010–11, 2011–12
- DiDi Richards – 2019–20

NCAA basketball tournament Most Outstanding Player

- Sophia Young – 2005
- Brittney Griner – 2012
- Chloe Jackson – 2019

Nancy Lieberman Award – Nation's top collegiate point guard

- Odyssey Sims – 2013–14

Naismith Defensive Player of the Year Award

- DiDi Richards – 2019–20

== All-time series records against current & former Big 12 members ==
- As of Fall 2021

Baylor vs. the Big 12*
Baylor vs.	Overall Record	at Waco	at Opponent's Venue	at Neutral Site	Last 5 Meetings	Last 10 Meetings	Current Streak	Since Beginning of Big 12
Colorado	BU, 12–8	BU, 6–2	tie, 5–5	tie, 1–1	BU, 5–2	BU, 8–2	W 8	BU, 12–5
Iowa State	BU, 30–9	BU, 16–2	BU, 10–6	BU, 4–1	BU, 5–0	BU, 9–1	L 2	BU, 30–9
Kansas	BU, 34–8	BU, 17–2	BU, 13–5	BU, 4–1	BU, 5–0	BU, 10-0	W 15	BU, 34–6
Kansas State	BU, 40–8	BU, 17–1	BU, 14–3	BU, 10–3	BU, 5–0	BU, 10–0	W 36	BU, 40–7
Missouri	BU, 16–5	BU, 9–1	BU, 5–3	BU, 2–1	BU, 4–1	BU, 8–2	W 3	BU, 15–4
Nebraska	BU, 10–6	BU, 6–2	BU, 4–3	NU, 0–1	BU, 3–2	BU, 7–3	W 1	BU, 10–6
Oklahoma	BU, 32–25	BU, 16–9	BU, 15-12	OU, 1–5	BU, 5–0	BU, 10–0	W 12	BU, 32–22
Oklahoma State	BU, 45–11	BU, 25–2	BU, 15–9	BU, 5–0	BU, 5–0	BU, 10–0	W 10	BU, 44–11
Texas	UT, 59-45	UT, 23-24	UT, 27-17	UT, 5–6	BU, 5-0	BU 10–0	W 11	BU, 39–17
Texas A&M	BU, 50–36	BU, 26–13	A&M, 17–18	BU, 7–4	BU, 4–1	BU, 8–2	W 3	BU, 31–7
TCU	BU, 42–5	BU, 19–2	BU, 20–3	BU, 2–0	BU, 5–0	BU, 10–0	W 31	BU, 21–0
Texas Tech	BU, 49–47	BU, 21-20	TT, 17-25	BU, 11–2	BU, 5–0	BU, 10–0	W 24	BU, 41–20
WVU	BU, 20–3	BU, 9–1	BU, 9–0	tied, 2–2	BU, 5–0	BU, 9–1	W 9	BU, 20–2
*Updated through the end of the 2018–19 season.

ALL-TIME BIG 12 WINS (REGULAR SEASON) AS OF 2018–2019

289 – Baylor (.753),

240 – Oklahoma (.625),

232 – Texas (.604),

221 – Iowa State (.576),

192 – Kansas State (.500),

182 – Texas Tech (.474),

152 – Oklahoma State (.396),

126 – Kansas (.328),

71 – West Virginia (.563),

50 – TCU (.397)

== Year by year results ==
Conference tournament winners noted with # Source

Season	Team	Overall	Conference	Standing	Postseason	Coaches' poll	AP poll
Olga Fallen (Independent) (1974–1979)
1974–75	Olga Fallen	30–11	–		AIAW State Playoffs		
1975–76	Olga Fallen	31–6	–		AIAW Quarterfinals		
1976–77	Olga Fallen	32–12	–		AIAW Fifth Place		12
1977–78	Olga Fallen	33–8	–		AIAW Regional Playoffs		
1978–79	Olga Fallen	17–13	–		AIAW State Playoffs		
Olga Fallen:		143–50	–				
Pam Bowers (Independent, Southwest) (1979–1994)
1979–80	Pam Bowers	4–24	–				
1980–81	Pam Bowers	29–11	–		NWIT Eighth Place		
1981–82	Pam Bowers	16–11	–				
Southwest Conference
1982–83	Pam Bowers	16–14	4–4	T-5th			
1983–84	Pam Bowers	15–12	9–7	T-4th			
1984–85	Pam Bowers	12–14	7–9	T-5th			
1985–86	Pam Bowers	6–21	4–12	7th			
1986–87	Pam Bowers	8–20	5–11	T-6th			
1987–88	Pam Bowers	10–20	3–13	T-8th			
1988–89	Pam Bowers	3–23	1–15	9th	includes forfeit loss to Texas Tech		
1989–90	Pam Bowers	4–23	1–15	9th			
1990–91	Pam Bowers	9–17	3–13	8th			
1991–92	Pam Bowers	11–17	3–11	8th			
1992–93	Pam Bowers	12–16	6–8	5th			
1993–94	Pam Bowers	13–14	4–10	7th			
Pam Bowers:		168–257	50–128				
Sonya Hogg (Southwest, Big 12) (1994–2000)
1994–95	Sonya Hogg	13–14	4–10	7th			
1995–96	Sonya Hogg	11–19	3–11	7th			
Big 12 Conference
1996–97	Sonya Hogg	15–13	7–9	T-8th (Big 12)			
1997–98	Sonya Hogg	20–11	6–10	T-5th	WNIT Finals		
1998–99	Sonya Hogg	17–14	8–8	T-5th	WNIT Sixteen		
1999–2000	Sonya Hogg	7–20	2–14	12th			
Sonya Hogg:		83–91	30–62				
Kim Mulkey (Big 12) (2000–2021)
2000–01	Kim Mulkey	21–9	9–7	6th	NCAA First Round		
2001–02	Kim Mulkey	27–6	12–4	2nd	NCAA Second Round	7	14
2002–03	Kim Mulkey	24–11	8–8	7th	WNIT Finals		
2003–04	Kim Mulkey	26–9	10–6	T-4th	NCAA Sweet Sixteen	15	11
2004–05	Kim Mulkey	33–3	14–2	1st	NCAA Champions	5	1
2005–06	Kim Mulkey	26–7	12–4	2nd	NCAA Sweet Sixteen	10	14
2006–07	Kim Mulkey	26–8	11–5	3rd	NCAA Second Round	19	19
2007–08	Kim Mulkey	25–7	12–4	2nd	NCAA Second Round	12	17
2008–09	Kim Mulkey	29–6	12–4	2nd	NCAA Sweet Sixteen	5	6
2009–10	Kim Mulkey	27–10	9–7	T-6th	NCAA Final Four	14	4
2010–11	Kim Mulkey	34–3	15–1	1st	NCAA Elite Eight	3	5
2011–12	Kim Mulkey	40–0	18–0	1st	NCAA Champions	1	1
2012–13	Kim Mulkey	34–2	18–0	1st	NCAA Sweet Sixteen	1	4
2013–14	Kim Mulkey	32–5	16–2	T-1st	NCAA Elite Eight	5	6
2014–15	Kim Mulkey	33–4	16–2	1st	NCAA Elite Eight	5	5
2015–16	Kim Mulkey	36–2	17–1	1st	NCAA Elite Eight	4	4
2016–17	Kim Mulkey	33–4	17–1	1st	NCAA Elite Eight	5	6
2017–18	Kim Mulkey	33–2	18–0	1st	NCAA Sweet Sixteen	2	
2018–19	Kim Mulkey	37–1	18–0	1st	NCAA Champions	1	1
2019–20	Kim Mulkey	28–2	17–1	1st	Cancelled due to COVID-19 Pandemic	2	3
2020–21	Kim Mulkey	28–3	17–1	1st	NCAA Elite Eight	5	5
Kim Mulkey:		632–104	296–60				
Nicki Collen (Big 12) (2021–present)
2021–22	Nicki Collen	28–6	15–3	1st	NCAA Second Round	11	7
2022–23	Nicki Collen	20–12	10–8	T–4th	NCAA Second Round		
2023–24	Nicki Collen	26–8	12–6	T–4th	NCAA Sweet Sixteen	13	15
2024–26	Nicki Collen	28–8	15–3	2nd	NCAA Second Round	18	18
2025–26	Nicki Collen	25–9	13–5	3rd	NCAA Second Round	21	23
Nicki Collen:		127–45	65–25				
Total:		1,103–510					
National champion Postseason invitational champion Conference regular season champion Conference regular season and conference tournament champion Division regular season champion Division regular season and conference tournament champion Conference tournament champion

== Postseason results ==
=== NCAA Division I ===
The Bears have appeared in 24 tournaments, with a record of 59–21.

Year	Seed	Round	Opponent	Result
2001	#8	First Round	#9 Arkansas	L 59–68
2002	#2	First Round; Second Round	#15 Bucknell #7 Drake	W 80–56; L 72–76
2004	#4	First Round; Second Round; Sweet Sixteen	#13 Loyola Marymount #5 Florida #1 Tennessee	W 71–60; W 91–76; L 69–71
2005	#2	First Round; Second Round; Sweet Sixteen; Elite Eight; Final Four; Title Game	#15 Illinois State #10 Oregon #3 Minnesota #1 North Carolina #1 LSU #1 Michigan State	W 91–70; W 69–46; W 64–57; W 72–63; W 68–57; W 84–62
2006	#3	First Round; Second Round; Sweet Sixteen	#14 Northern Arizona #11 New Mexico #2 Maryland	W 74–56; W 87–67; L 63–82
2007	#5	First Round; Second Round	#12 Chattanooga #4 NC State	W 68–55; L 72–78 (OT)
2008	#3	First Round; Second Round	#14 Fresno State #6 Pittsburgh	W 68–55; L 72–78 (OT)
2009	#2	First Round; Second Round; Sweet Sixteen	#15 UTSA #7 South Dakota State #3 Louisville	W 87–82 (OT); W 60–58; L 39–56
2010	#4	First Round; Second Round; Sweet Sixteen; Elite Eight; Final Four	#13 Fresno State #5 Georgetown #1 Tennessee #2 Duke #1 Connecticut	W 69–55; W 49–33; W 77–62; W 51–48; L 50–70
2011	#1	First Round; Second Round; Sweet Sixteen; Elite Eight	#16 Prairie View A&M #9 West Virginia #5 Green Bay #2 Texas A&M	W 66–30; W 82–68; W 86–76; L 46–58
2012	#1	First Round; Second Round; Sweet Sixteen; Elite Eight; Final Four; Title Game	#16 UC Santa Barbara #9 Florida #4 Georgia Tech #2 Tennessee #1 Stanford #1 Notre Dame	W 81–40; W 76–57; W 83–68; W 77–58; W 59–47; W 80–61
2013	#1	First Round; Second Round; Sweet Sixteen	#16 Prairie View A&M #8 Florida State #5 Louisville	W 82–40; W 85–47; L 81–82
2014	#2	First Round; Second Round; Sweet Sixteen; Elite Eight	#15 Western Kentucky #7 California #3 Kentucky #1 Notre Dame	W 87–74; W 75–56; W 90–72; L 69–88
2015	#2	First Round; Second Round; Sweet Sixteen; Elite Eight	#15 Northwestern State #10 Arkansas #3 Iowa #1 Notre Dame	W 77–36; W 73–44; W 81–66; L 68–77
2016	#1	First Round; Second Round; Sweet Sixteen; Elite Eight	#16 Idaho #9 Auburn #5 Florida State #2 Oregon State	W 89–59; W 84–52; W 78–58; L 57–60
2017	#1	First Round; Second Round; Sweet Sixteen; Elite Eight	#16 Texas Southern #9 California #4 Louisville #2 Mississippi State	W 119–30; W 86–46; W 97–63; L 85–94 (OT)
2018	#2	First Round; Second Round; Sweet Sixteen	#15 Grambling State #7 Michigan #3 Oregon State	W 96–46; W 80–58; L 67–72
2019	#1	First Round; Second Round; Sweet Sixteen; Elite Eight; Final Four; Title Game	#16 Abilene Christian #8 California #4 South Carolina #2 Iowa #2 Oregon #1 Notre Dame	W 95–38; W 102–63; W 93–68; W 85–53; W 72–67; W 82–81
2021	#2	First Round; Second Round; Sweet Sixteen; Elite Eight	#15 Jackson State #7 Virginia Tech #6 Michigan #1 UConn	W 101–52; W 90–48; W 78–75 (OT); L 67–69
2022	#2	First Round; Second Round	#15 Hawaii #10 South Dakota	W 89–49; L 47–67
2023	#7	First Round; Second Round	#10 Alabama #2 UConn	W 78–74; L 58–77
2024	#5	First Round; Second Round; Sweet Sixteen	#12 Vanderbilt #4 Virginia Tech #1 USC	W 80–63; W 75–72; L 70–74
2025	#4	First Round; Second Round	#13 Grand Canyon #5 Ole Miss	W 73–60; L 63–69
2026	#6	First Round; Second Round	#11 Nebraska #3 Duke	W 67–62; L 48–69

=== NCAA Tournament Seeding History ===
The following lists where the Bears have been seeded in the NCAA tournament.

Years →	'01	'02	'04	'05	'06	'07	'08	'09	'10	'11	'12	'13	'14	'15	'16	'17	'18	'19	'21	'22	'23	'24	'25	'26
Seeds →	8	2	4	2	3	5	3	2	4	1	1	1	2	2	1	1	2	1	2	2	7	5	4	6

=== AIAW Division I ===
The Lady Bears made two appearances in the AIAW National Division I basketball tournament, with a combined record of 5–3.

Year	Round	Opponent	Result
1976	First Round; Quarterfinals; Consolation Second Round	Southern Connecticut; Delta State; Tennessee Tech	W, 76–72; L, 57–97; L, 78–89
1977	First Round; Quarterfinals; Consolation Second Round; Consolation Third Round; Fifth Place Game	Saint Joseph's; LSU; Missouri; Utah; Southern Connecticut	W, 85–75; L, 64–71; W, 85–75; W, 77–52; W, 71–69

Preceded by Connecticut Huskies women's basketball	Last NCAA team to finish the year undefeated or unbeaten in any sport April 3, 2012	Succeeded by Minnesota Golden Gophers women's ice hockey
