= Tyra White =

American basketball player

Personal information
- Born: March 23, 1989 (age 37) Kansas City, Missouri, U.S.
- Listed height: 6 ft 0 in (1.83 m)

Career information
- High school: Hickman Mills (Kansas City, Missouri)
- College: Texas A&M (2007–2012)
- WNBA draft: 2012: 2nd round, 16th overall pick
- Drafted by: Los Angeles Sparks
- Position: Guard

Career highlights
- NCAA champion (2011); 2× First-team All-Big 12 (2011, 2012); McDonald's All-American (2007)
- Stats at Basketball Reference

Tyra Marie White (born Match 23, 1989) is a basketball player who was drafted by the Los Angeles Sparks. She played college basketball for Texas A&M University.

== Texas A&M statistics ==
Legend
GP	Games played	GS	Games started	MPG	Minutes per game
FG%	Field goal percentage	3P%	3-point field goal percentage	FT%	Free throw percentage
RPG	Rebounds per game	APG	Assists per game	SPG	Steals per game
BPG	Blocks per game	PPG	Points per game	**Bold**	Career high

Year	Team	GP	Points	FG%	3P%	FT%	RPG	APG	SPG	BPG	PPG
2007-08	Texas A&M	1	-	-	-	-	-	-	-	-	-
2008-09	Texas A&M	34	178	39.5	26.3	60.0	2.4	0.3	0.4	0.2	5.2
2009-10	Texas A&M	34	359	**52.7**	38.4	**68.8**	4.1	1.2	0.7	0.2	10.6
2010-11	Texas A&M	**38**	**526**	49.4	**39.3**	62.4	5.1	1.7	**1.1**	0.4	**13.8**
2011-12	Texas A&M	32	419	41.2	26.2	58.8	**5.6**	**1.7**	1.0	**0.6**	13.1
Career totals	Texas A&M	139	1482	46.2	34.0	61.7	4.3	1.2	0.8	0.4	10.7
