= 2010–11 Baylor Lady Bears basketball team =

Intercollegiate basketball season

2010–11 Baylor Lady Bears basketball

Big 12 Tournament champions Big 12 regular season champions World Vision Classic champions Sunsplash Shootout champions

NCAA tournament, Elite Eight
- Conference: Big 12 Conference

Ranking
- Coaches: No. 3
- AP: No. 3
- Record: 34–3 (15–1 Big 12)
- Head coach: Kim Mulkey
- Assistant coaches: Bill Brock; Leon Barmore; Damion McKinney
- Home arena: Ferrell Center

2010–11 Big 12 women's basketball standings
	Conf.				Overall
Team	W		L	PCT	W		L	PCT
#3 Baylor†	15	–	1	.938	34	–	3	.919
#8 Texas A&M	13	–	3	.813	33	–	5	.868
#21 Oklahoma	10	–	6	.625	23	–	12	.657
Kansas State	10	–	6	.625	21	–	11	.656
Iowa State	9	–	7	.563	22	–	11	.667
Texas Tech	8	–	8	.500	22	–	11	.667
Texas	7	–	9	.438	19	–	14	.576
Kansas	6	–	10	.375	21	–	13	.618
Colorado	6	–	10	.375	18	–	16	.529
Missouri	5	–	11	.313	13	–	18	.419
Oklahoma State	4	–	17	.190	15	–	11	.577
Nebraska	3	–	13	.188	13	–	18	.419
† 2011 Big 12 Tournament winner As of April 4, 2011; Rankings from AP Poll

The 2010–11 Baylor Lady Bears women's basketball team were coached by Kim Mulkey. The Bears were a member of the Big 12 Conference.

== Preseason ==
Date	Location	Opponent	Bears Points	Opp. Points	Record
Nov. 1	Waco, Texas	St. Edwards	89	46	1-0
Nov. 5	Waco, Texas	Texas A&M-International	107	26	2-0

== Roster ==
Number	Name	Height	Position	Class
0	Odyssey Sims	5-9	Guard	Freshman
1	Kimetria Hayden	5-11	Guard	Sophomore
3	Jordan Madden	6-0	Guard	Sophomore
4	Whitney Zachariason	6-2	Forward	Senior
5	Melissa Jones	5-11	Guard	Senior
10	Destiny Williams	6-1	Forward	Sophomore
15	Shanay Washington	6-1	Guard	Sophomore
20	Terran Condrey	5-7	Guard	Junior
24	Ashley Field	6-2	Center	Junior
25	Lindsay Palmer	5-10	Guard	Junior
32	Brooklyn Pope	6-1	Forward/Guard	Redshirt Junior
42	Brittney Griner	6-8	Center	Sophomore
44	Mariah Chandler	6-2	Forward	Sophomore

== Schedule ==
- The Bears will participate in several notable events.

Date time, TV	Rank^{#}	Opponent^{#}	Result	Record	Site (attendance) city, state
Regular season
2010/11/12*; 6:30 p.m.	No. 2	Florida International; World Vision Classic	W 83-36	1-0 (0-0)	Ferrell Center (7,020); Waco, Texas
2010/11/13*; 12:00 p.m.	No. 2	Montana State; World Vision Classic	W 93-56	2-0 (0-0)	Ferrell Center (6,131); Waco, Texas
2010/11/14*; 2:30 p.m.	No. 2	Rice; World Vision Classic	W 95-51	3-0 (0-0)	Ferrell Center (6,723); Waco, Texas
2010/11/16*; 5:00 p.m., ESPN2	No. 2	No. 1 Connecticut; Tipoff Classic	W 65-64	3-1 (0-0)	XL Center (12,628); Hartford, CT
2010/11/19*; 7:00 p.m.	No. 2	No. 25 Michigan State	W 78-52	4-1 (0-0)	Ferrell Center (7,467); Waco, Texas
2010/11/23*; 7:00 p.m.	No. 2	Texas Southern	W 100-43	5-1 (0-0)	Ferrell Center (6,291); Waco, Texas
2010/11/26*; 7:00 p.m.	No. 2	Liberty	W 81-42	6-1 (0-0)	Ferrell Center (6,492); Waco, Texas
2010/11/28*; 2:00 p.m.	No. 2	Southeastern Louisiana	W 106-41	7-1 (0-0)	Ferrell Center (6,015); Waco, Texas
2010/12/1*; 7:00 p.m.	No. 2	No. 16 Notre Dame	W 76-65	8-1 (0-0)	Ferrell Center (7,239); Waco, Texas
2010/12/5*; 1:00 p.m., FSN Southwest	No. 2	Minnesota	W 103-56	9-1 (0-0)	Ferrell Center (6,581); Waco, Texas
2010/12/14*; 6:00 p.m., ESPN2	No. 2	No. 6 Tennessee	W 65-54	10-1 (0-0)	Ferrell Center (10,569); Waco, Texas
2010/12/20*; 7:15 p.m.	No. 2	Clemson; Sunsplash Shootout	W 82-40	11-1 (0-0)	Kendall Isaacs Gym (335); Nassau, Bahamas
2010/12/21*; 7:15 p.m.	No. 2	No. 23 Syracuse; Sunsplash Shootout	W 77-43	12-1 (0-0)	Kendall Isaacs Gym (199); Nassau, Bahamas
2010/12/30*; 7:00 p.m.	No. 2	Texas-Pan American	W 101-55	13-1 (0-0)	Ferrell Center (6800); Waco, Texas
2011/1/8; 11:00 a.m., FSN	No. 1	No. 16 Iowa State	W 70-58	14-1 (1-0)	Ferrell Center (7780); Waco, Texas
2011/1/2; 7:00 p.m.	No. 1	Texas	W 87-72	15-1 (2-0)	Frank Erwin Center (6,517); Austin, Texas
2011/1/15; 7:00 p.m.	No. 1	Oklahoma State	W 70-39	16-1 (3-0)	Ferrell Center (9,038); Waco, Texas
2011/1/19; 7:00 p.m., Sunflower	No. 1	Kansas	W 76-37	17-1 (4-0)	Allen Fieldhouse (1,486); Lawrence, Kansas
2011/1/22; 7:30 p.m.	No. 1	No. 25 Texas Tech	W 64-51	18-1 (5-0)	Ferrell Center (10,379); Waco, Texas
2011/1/30; 12:00 p.m., FSN	No. 1	No. 6 Texas A&M	W 63-60	19-1 (6-0)	Reed Arena (13,162); College Station, Texas
2011/2/2; 7:00 p.m.	No. 1	No. 13 Oklahoma	W 92-70	20-1 (7-0)	Ferrell Center (7,814); Waco, Texas
2011/2/6; 1:00 p.m., ESPNU	No. 1	Oklahoma State	W 84-57	21-1 (8-0)	Gallagher-Iba Arena (2,471); Stillwater, Oklahoma
2011/2/9; 7:05 p.m.	No. 1	Nebraska	W 69-48	22-1 (9-0)	Bob Devaney Sports Center (6,102); Lincoln, Nebraska
2011/2/12; 12:30 p.m., FSN	No. 1	Texas	W 96-68	23-1 (10-0)	Ferrell Center (10,295); Waco, Texas
2011/2/14; 8:30 p.m., ESPN2	No. 1	No. 5 Texas A&M	W 67-58	24-1 (11-0)	Ferrell Center (10,299); Waco, Texas
2011/2/19; 12:30 p.m., FSN Southwest	No. 1	Texas Tech	L 45-56	24-2 (11-1)	United Spirit Arena (10,201); Lubbock, Texas
2011/2/23; 7:00 p.m.	No. 3	Kansas State	W 75-48	25-2 (12-1)	Ferrell Center (7,820); Waco, Texas
2011/2/27; 4:00 p.m., ESPN2	No. 3	No. 16 Oklahoma	W 82-81	26-2 (13-1)	Lloyd Noble Center (9,858); Norman, Oklahoma
2011/3/2; 7:00 p.m.	No. 3	Missouri	W 84-52	27-2 (14-1)	Ferrell Center (8,995); Waco, Texas
2011/3/5; 3:00 p.m.	No. 3	Colorado	W 81-59	28-2 (15-1)	Coors Events Center (6,012); Boulder, Colorado
Big 12 Tournament
2011/3/9; 11:00 a.m., FSN	No. 3	Kansas; Big 12 Quarterfinals	W 86-51	29-2 (15-1)	Municipal Auditorium (4,584); Kansas City, Missouri
2011/3/11; 12:00 p.m., FSN	No. 3	Kansas State; Big 12 Semifinals	W 86-53	30-2 (15-1)	Municipal Auditorium (4,852); Kansas City, Missouri
2011/3/12; 11:00 a.m., FSN	No. 3	No. 8 Texas A&M; Big 12 Finals	W 61-58	31-2 (15-1)	Municipal Auditorium (4,250); Kansas City, Missouri
2011 NCAA tournament
2011/3/20; 6:40 p.m., ESPN2	No. 3	Prairie View A&M	W 66-30	32-2 (15-1)	Ferrell Center (8,368); Waco, Texas
2011/3/22; 8:30 p.m., ESPN2	No. 3	West Virginia	W 82-68	33-2 (15-1)	Ferrell Center (8,436); Waco, Texas
2011/3/27; 5:30 p.m., ESPN2	No. 3	No. 13 Green Bay	W 86-76	34-2 (15-1)	American Airlines Center (9,522); Dallas, Texas
2011/3/29; 8:00 p.m., ESPN	No. 3	No. 8 Texas A&M	L 46-58	34-3 (15-1)	American Airlines Center (11,508); Dallas, Texas
*Non-conference game. ^{#}Rankings from AP Poll. (#) Tournament seedings in parentheses. All times are in Central Time.

== Player stats ==
Player	Games Played	Minutes	Field Goals	Three Pointers	Free Throws	Rebounds	Assists	Blocks	Steals	Points

== Postseason ==
Baylor received a #1 seed in the Dallas region. They defeated Prairie View A&M at home in the Ferrell Center, 66-30 and West Virginia 82-68, to advance to their sixth Sweet Sixteen in the last eight seasons. They beat 5th seeded Green Bay 86-76 in Dallas. They played Texas A&M for the fourth time in 2011 and were defeated by a 58-46 score.

== Awards and honors ==
- Brittney Griner, 2011 WBCA National Defensive Player of the Year
- Brittney Griner, Finalist, 2011 Wooden Award

=== All-Americans ===
- Brittney Griner, AP All-American first-team
- Melissa Jones, AP All-American honorable mention
- Odyssey Sims, AP All-American first-team honorable mention

== Team players drafted into the WNBA ==
Round	Pick	Player	WNBA club
