= 2011 NCAA Division I women's basketball tournament =

2011 basketball tournament

- Teams: 64
- Finals site: Conseco Fieldhouse, Indianapolis, Indiana
- Champions: Texas A&M Aggies (1st title, 1st title game, 1st Final Four)
- Runner-up: Notre Dame Fighting Irish (2nd title game, 3rd Final Four)
- Semifinalists: Connecticut Huskies (12th Final Four); Stanford Cardinal (10th Final Four)
- Winning coach: Gary Blair (1st title)
- MOP: Danielle Adams (Texas A&M)

The 2011 NCAA Division I women's basketball tournament began on March 19, 2011, and concluded on April 5, 2011. The Texas A&M Aggies won the championship, defeating the Notre Dame Fighting Irish 76–70 in the final held at Conseco Fieldhouse in Indianapolis.

The tournament was also notable for a historic run by Gonzaga that ultimately ended in the final of the Spokane Region. With the help of two games on their home court and a regional held less than two miles away, the #11-seeded Bulldogs became the lowest seed ever to make a regional final in the history of the women's tournament.

Coincidentally, #11 seed VCU reached the men's Final Four, the third #11 to advance that far since the men's tournament expanded to 64 teams in 1985.

LSU, which reached five consecutive Final Fours from 2004 to 2008, did not qualify for the first time since 1998.

== Tournament procedure ==
Sixty-four teams entered the 2011 tournament. Thirty automatic bids were extended to the champions of conference tournaments, with a 31st going to the regular season champion of the Ivy League. The remaining 33 bids were "at-large", with selections extended by the NCAA Selection Committee.

The tournament was split into four regional tournaments, and each region had teams seeded from 1 to 16, with the committee ostensibly making every region as comparable to the others as possible. The top-seeded team in each region plays the #16 team, the #2 team plays the #15, etc. (meaning where the two seeds add up to 17, that team will be assigned to play another).

The Selection Committee also seeded the entire field from 1 to 64.

== 2Schedule and venues ==
There were 64 teams in the tournament, placed in a seeded bracket with four regions. Thirty-two teams received automatic bids – thirty-one of which were their conference tournament champions; the other was for the Ivy League regular-season champion. An additional 32 teams were given at-large bids by the selection committee on the basis of their body of work during the regular season. Unlike the men's tournament, there was no "First Four" round.

2011 NCAA subregionals

First and second rounds (subregionals)

Subregionals were played from March 19 through March 22.

The following 16 sites were used for first and second-round games:

- The Pit, University of New Mexico, Albuquerque, New Mexico
- Auburn Arena, Auburn University, Auburn, Alabama
- John Paul Jones Arena, University of Virginia, Charlottesville, Virginia
- Cintas Center, Xavier University, Cincinnati, Ohio
- Comcast Center, University of Maryland, College Park, College Park, Maryland
- St. John Arena, Ohio State University, Columbus, Ohio
- Cameron Indoor Stadium, Duke University, Durham, North Carolina
- Thompson-Boling Arena, University of Tennessee, Knoxville, Tennessee
- Jon M. Huntsman Center, University of Utah, Salt Lake City, Utah
- McCarthey Athletic Center, Gonzaga University, Spokane, Washington
- CenturyTel Center, Bossier City, Louisiana (host: Louisiana Tech University)
- Maples Pavilion, Stanford University, Palo Alto, California
- Harry A. Gampel Pavilion, University of Connecticut, Storrs, Connecticut
- Bryce Jordan Center, Pennsylvania State University, University Park, Pennsylvania
- Ferrell Center, Baylor University, Waco, Texas
- INTRUST Bank Arena, Wichita, Kansas (host: Wichita State University)
2011 NCAA regionals and Final Four

Regional semifinals and finals (Sweet Sixteen and Elite Eight)

The regionals, named for the city rather than the region of geographic importance since 2005, which were held from March 26 to 29, were held at these sites:

- Dayton Regional, University of Dayton Arena, Dayton, Ohio
- Spokane Regional, Spokane Veterans Memorial Arena, Spokane, Washington (host: Washington State University)
- Dallas Regional, American Airlines Center, Dallas, Texas (host Big 12 Conference)
- Philadelphia Regional, Liacouras Center, Temple University, Philadelphia, Pennsylvania

NOTES: 1. Unless noted, all sites are on campus.
2. This marked the first time since the NCAA started pre-determining subregional sites that one city hosted both a sub-regional and regional final as Spokane served as a host city twice in the same tournament.

National semifinals and championship (Final Four and national championship)

- April 3 and 5
  - Bankers Life Fieldhouse, Indianapolis, Indiana (hosts: Horizon League and Indiana University – Purdue University Indianapolis)

This was the second time that Indianapolis hosted a Women's Final Four Basketball tournament; the prior times were in 2005 as per the NCAA's policy of hosting one of each of the men's and women's Final Four every five years in the home city of the NCAA offices.

== Tournament records ==
- Field goals—Maya Moore attempted 30 field goals in the semifinal against Notre Dame, the most ever attempted in a Final Four game.
- Free throws—Texas A&M completed ten out of ten free throw attempts, tied for the highest percentage free throw shooting by a team in an NCAA Tournament game (minimum-nine attempts).
- Free throws—Marquette completed zero free throws in a game against Texas, tied for the fewest free throws completed in an NCAA Tournament game.
- Field goals—Nicole Griffin, Oklahoma, hit 15 of 19 field goal attempts, the highest field goal completion percentage for an individual in an NCAA Tournament.

== Qualifying teams – automatic ==
Sixty-four teams were selected to participate in the 2011 NCAA Tournament. Thirty-one conferences were eligible for an automatic bid to the 2011 NCAA tournament. Tennessee continued its record of being present at every NCAA Tournament since the NCAA began sanctioning women's sports in the 1981–82 school year.

Automatic bids
| | | Record | | |
| Qualifying school | Conference | Regular season | Conference | Seed |
|---|---|---|---|---|
| Arkansas–Little Rock | Sun Belt | 23–7 | 14–2 | 12 |
| Baylor | Big 12 | 31–2 | 15–1 | 1 |
| Bowling Green | MAC | 28–4 | 13–3 | 12 |
| UC Davis | Big West | 24–8 | 10–6 | 16 |
| UCF | C-USA | 22–10 | 12–4 | 13 |
| Connecticut | Big East | 32–1 | 16–0 | 1 |
| Duke | ACC | 29–3 | 12–2 | 2 |
| Fresno State | WAC | 25–7 | 14–2 | 12 |
| Gardner–Webb | Big South | 23–10 | 11–5 | 14 |
| Gonzaga | West Coast | 28–4 | 14–0 | 11 |
| Green Bay | Horizon | 32–1 | 18–0 | 5 |
| Hampton | MEAC | 26–6 | 15–1 | 13 |
| Hartford | America East | 17–15 | 11–5 | 16 |
| James Madison | Colonial | 26–7 | 16–2 | 11 |
| Marist | MAAC | 30–2 | 18–0 | 10 |
| McNeese State | Southland | 26–6 | 15–1 | 15 |
| Montana | Big Sky | 18–14 | 10–6 | 14 |
| Navy | Patriot | 20–11 | 10–4 | 14 |
| Northern Iowa | Missouri Valley | 27–5 | 17–1 | 13 |
| Ohio State | Big Ten | 22–9 | 10–6 | 4 |
| Prairie View A&M | SWAC | 21–11 | 14–4 | 16 |
| Princeton | Ivy | 24–4 | 13–1 | 12 |
| Saint Francis (PA) | Northeast | 22–11 | 14–4 | 13 |
| Samford | Southern | 25–7 | 15–5 | 14 |
| South Dakota State | Summit | 19–13 | 12–6 | 15 |
| Stanford | Pac-10 | 29–2 | 18–0 | 1 |
| Stetson | Atlantic Sun | 20–12 | 14–7 | 16 |
| Tennessee | SEC | 31–2 | 16–0 | 1 |
| Tennessee–Martin | Ohio Valley | 21–10 | 14–4 | 15 |
| Utah | Mountain West | 18–16 | 7–9 | 15 |
| Xavier | Atlantic 10 | 28–2 | 14–0 | 2 |

== Qualifying teams – at-large ==
Thirty-three additional teams were selected to complete the sixty-four invitations.

At-large bids
| | | Record | | |
| Qualifying school | Conference | Regular season | Conference | Seed |
|---|---|---|---|---|
| Arizona State | Pac-10 | 20–10 | 11–7 | 7 |
| Dayton | Atlantic 10 | 21–11 | 9–5 | 11 |
| DePaul | Big East | 27–6 | 13–3 | 3 |
| Florida State | ACC | 23–7 | 11–3 | 3 |
| Georgetown | Big East | 23–8 | 9–7 | 5 |
| Georgia | SEC | 21–10 | 10–6 | 6 |
| Georgia Tech | ACC | 23–10 | 9–5 | 5 |
| Houston | C-USA | 26–5 | 16–0 | 8 |
| Iowa | Big Ten | 22–8 | 10–6 | 6 |
| Iowa State | Big 12 | 22–10 | 9–7 | 7 |
| Kansas State | Big 12 | 21–10 | 10–6 | 8 |
| Kentucky | SEC | 24–8 | 11–5 | 4 |
| Louisiana Tech | WAC | 24–7 | 15–1 | 10 |
| Louisville | Big East | 20–12 | 10–6 | 7 |
| Marquette | Big East | 23–8 | 10–6 | 8 |
| Maryland | ACC | 23–7 | 9–5 | 4 |
| Miami | ACC | 27–4 | 12–2 | 3 |
| Michigan State | Big Ten | 26–5 | 13–3 | 4 |
| Middle Tennessee | Sun Belt | 23–7 | 14–2 | 11 |
| North Carolina | ACC | 25–8 | 8–6 | 5 |
| Notre Dame | Big East | 26–7 | 13–3 | 2 |
| Oklahoma | Big 12 | 21–11 | 10–6 | 6 |
| Penn State | Big Ten | 24–9 | 11–5 | 6 |
| Purdue | Big Ten | 20–11 | 9–7 | 9 |
| Rutgers | Big East | 19–12 | 11–5 | 7 |
| St. John's | Big East | 21–10 | 9–7 | 9 |
| Temple | Atlantic 10 | 23–8 | 13–1 | 10 |
| Texas | Big 12 | 19–13 | 7–9 | 9 |
| Texas A&M | Big 12 | 27–5 | 13–3 | 2 |
| Texas Tech | Big 12 | 22–10 | 8–8 | 8 |
| UCLA | Pac-10 | 27–4 | 16–2 | 3 |
| Vanderbilt | SEC | 20–11 | 10–6 | 10 |
| West Virginia | Big East | 23–9 | 8–8 | 9 |

== Tournament seeds ==
Philadelphia RegionalLiacouras Center, Philadelphia, Pennsylvania
| Seed | School | Conference | Record | Berth type |
|---|---|---|---|---|
| 1 | Connecticut | Big East | 32–1 | Automatic |
| 2 | Duke | ACC | 29–3 | Automatic |
| 3 | DePaul | Big East | 27–6 | At-large |
| 4 | Maryland | ACC | 23–7 | At-large |
| 5 | Georgetown | Big East | 23–8 | At-large |
| 6 | Penn State | Big Ten | 24–9 | At-large |
| 7 | Iowa State | Big 12 | 22–10 | At-large |
| 8 | Kansas State | Big 12 | 21–10 | At-large |
| 9 | Purdue | Big Ten | 20–11 | At-large |
| 10 | Marist | MAAC | 30–2 | Automatic |
| 11 | Dayton | Atlantic 10 | 21–11 | At-large |
| 12 | Princeton | Ivy | 24–4 | Automatic |
| 13 | Saint Francis (PA) | Northeast | 22–11 | Automatic |
| 14 | Navy | Patriot | 20–11 | Automatic |
| 15 | Tennessee-Martin | Ohio Valley | 21–10 | Automatic |
| 16 | Hartford | America East | 17–15 | Automatic |

Spokane RegionalSpokane Veterans Memorial Arena, Spokane, Washington
| Seed | School | Conference | Record | Berth type |
|---|---|---|---|---|
| 1 | Stanford | Pac-10 | 29–2 | Automatic |
| 2 | Xavier | Atlantic 10 | 28–2 | Automatic |
| 3 | UCLA | Pac-10 | 27–4 | At-large |
| 4 | Kentucky | SEC | 24–8 | At-large |
| 5 | North Carolina | ACC | 25–8 | At-large |
| 6 | Iowa | Big Ten | 22–8 | At-large |
| 7 | Louisville | Big East | 20–12 | At-large |
| 8 | Texas Tech | Big 12 | 22–10 | At-large |
| 9 | St. John's | Big East | 21–10 | At-large |
| 10 | Vanderbilt | SEC | 20–11 | At-large |
| 11 | Gonzaga | West Coast | 28–4 | Automatic |
| 12 | Fresno State | WAC | 25–7 | Automatic |
| 13 | Hampton | MEAC | 26–6 | Automatic |
| 14 | Montana | Big Sky | 18–14 | Automatic |
| 15 | South Dakota State | Summit | 19–13 | Automatic |
| 16 | UC Davis | Big West | 24–8 | Automatic |

Dayton RegionalUniversity of Dayton Arena, Dayton, Ohio
| Seed | School | Conference | Record | Berth type |
|---|---|---|---|---|
| 1 | Tennessee | SEC | 31–2 | Automatic |
| 2 | Notre Dame | Big East | 26–7 | At-large |
| 3 | Miami (FL) | ACC | 27–4 | At-large |
| 4 | Ohio State | Big Ten | 22–9 | Automatic |
| 5 | Georgia Tech | ACC | 23–10 | At-large |
| 6 | Oklahoma | Big 12 | 21–11 | At-large |
| 7 | Arizona State | Pac-10 | 20–10 | At-large |
| 8 | Marquette | Big East | 23–8 | At-large |
| 9 | Texas | Big 12 | 19–13 | At-large |
| 10 | Temple | Atlantic 10 | 23–8 | At-large |
| 11 | James Madison | CAA | 26–7 | Automatic |
| 12 | Bowling Green | MAC | 28–4 | Automatic |
| 13 | UCF | Conference USA | 22–10 | Automatic |
| 14 | Gardner-Webb | Big South | 23–10 | Automatic |
| 15 | Utah | Mountain West | 18–16 | Automatic |
| 16 | Stetson | Atlantic Sun | 20–12 | Automatic |

Dallas RegionalAmerican Airlines Center, Dallas, Texas
| Seed | School | Conference | Record | Berth type |
|---|---|---|---|---|
| 1 | Baylor | Big 12 | 31–2 | Automatic |
| 2 | Texas A&M | Big 12 | 27–5 | At-large |
| 3 | Florida State | ACC | 23–7 | At-large |
| 4 | Michigan State | Big Ten | 26–5 | At-large |
| 5 | Green Bay | Horizon | 32–1 | Automatic |
| 6 | Georgia | SEC | 21–10 | At-large |
| 7 | Rutgers | Big East | 19–12 | At-large |
| 8 | Houston | Conference USA | 26–5 | At-large |
| 9 | West Virginia | Big East | 23–9 | At-large |
| 10 | Louisiana Tech | WAC | 24–7 | At-large |
| 11 | Middle Tennessee | Sun Belt | 23–7 | At-large |
| 12 | Arkansas-Little Rock | Sun Belt | 23–7 | Automatic |
| 13 | Northern Iowa | Missouri Valley | 27–5 | Automatic |
| 14 | Samford | Southern | 25–7 | Automatic |
| 15 | McNeese State | Southland | 26–6 | Automatic |
| 16 | Prairie View A&M | SWAC | 21–11 | Automatic |

== Bids by conference ==
Thirty-one conferences earned an automatic bid. In twenty-one cases, the automatic bid was the only representative from the conference. Thirty-three additional at-large teams were selected from ten of the conferences.

| Bids | Conference | Teams |
|---|---|---|
| 9 | Big East | Connecticut, DePaul, Georgetown, Louisville, Marquette, Notre Dame, Rutgers, St. John's, West Virginia |
| 7 | Big 12 | Baylor, Iowa State, Kansas State, Oklahoma, Texas, Texas A&M, Texas Tech |
| 6 | ACC | Duke, Florida State, Georgia Tech, Maryland, Miami, North Carolina |
| 5 | Big Ten | Ohio State, Iowa, Michigan State, Penn State, Purdue |
| 4 | SEC | Tennessee, Georgia, Kentucky, Vanderbilt |
| 3 | Atlantic 10 | Xavier, Dayton, Temple |
| 3 | Pac-10 | Stanford, Arizona State, UCLA |
| 2 | C-USA | UCF, Houston |
| 2 | Sun Belt | Arkansas–Little Rock, Middle Tennessee |
| 2 | WAC | Fresno State, Louisiana Tech |
| 1 | America East | Hartford |
| 1 | Atlantic Sun | Stetson |
| 1 | Big Sky | Montana |
| 1 | Big South | Gardner-Webb |
| 1 | Big West | UC Davis |
| 1 | Colonial | James Madison |
| 1 | Horizon | Green Bay |
| 1 | Ivy | Princeton |
| 1 | MAAC | Marist |
| 1 | MAC | Bowling Green |
| 1 | MEAC | Hampton |
| 1 | Missouri Valley | Northern Iowa |
| 1 | Mountain West | Utah |
| 1 | Northeast | Saint Francis (PA) |
| 1 | Ohio Valley | Tennessee–Martin |
| 1 | Patriot | Navy |
| 1 | Southern | Samford |
| 1 | Southland | McNeese State |
| 1 | Summit | South Dakota State |
| 1 | SWAC | Prairie View |
| 1 | West Coast | Gonzaga |

== Bids by state ==
The sixty-four teams came from thirty states, plus Washington, D.C. Texas had the most teams with six bids. Twenty states did not have any teams receiving bids.

NCAA women's basketball tournament invitations by state 2011

| Bids | State | Teams |
|---|---|---|
| 6 | Texas | Baylor, Prairie View, Houston, Texas, Texas A&M, Texas Tech |
| 4 | California | Fresno State, Stanford, UC Davis, UCLA |
| 4 | Florida | Stetson, UCF, Florida State, Miami |
| 4 | Ohio | Bowling Green, Ohio State, Xavier, Dayton |
| 4 | Tennessee | Tennessee, Tennessee–Martin, Middle Tennessee, Vanderbilt |
| 3 | Iowa | Northern Iowa, Iowa, Iowa State |
| 3 | Pennsylvania | Penn State, Saint Francis (PA), Temple |
| 3 | North Carolina | Duke, Gardner-Webb, North Carolina |
| 2 | Connecticut | Connecticut, Hartford |
| 2 | Georgia | Georgia, Georgia Tech |
| 2 | Indiana | Notre Dame, Purdue |
| 2 | Kentucky | Kentucky, Louisville |
| 2 | Louisiana | McNeese State, Louisiana Tech |
| 2 | Maryland | Navy, Maryland |
| 2 | New Jersey | Princeton, Rutgers |
| 2 | New York | Marist, St. John's |
| 2 | Virginia | Hampton, James Madison |
| 2 | Wisconsin | Green Bay, Marquette |
| 1 | Alabama | Samford |
| 1 | Arizona | Arizona State |
| 1 | Arkansas | Arkansas–Little Rock |
| 1 | District of Columbia | Georgetown |
| 1 | Illinois | DePaul |
| 1 | Kansas | Kansas State |
| 1 | Michigan | Michigan State |
| 1 | Montana | Montana |
| 1 | Oklahoma | Oklahoma |
| 1 | South Dakota | South Dakota State |
| 1 | Utah | Utah |
| 1 | Washington | Gonzaga |
| 1 | West Virginia | West Virginia |

== Brackets ==
* – Denotes overtime period
Unless otherwise noted, all times listed are Eastern Daylight Time (UTC-04).

=== Philadelphia Region ===
First round March 19–20
1 | Connecticut | 75
16 | Hartford | 39
Storrs, CT
8 | Kansas State | 45
9 | Purdue | 53
5 | Georgetown | 65
12 | Princeton | 49
College Park, MD
4 | Maryland | 70
13 | Saint Francis | 48
6 | Penn State | 75
11 | Dayton | 66
University Park, PA
3 | DePaul | 56
14 | Navy | 43
7 | Iowa State | 64
10 | Marist | 74
Durham, NC
2 | Duke | 90
15 | Tennessee–Martin | 45

Second round March 21–22
1 | Connecticut | 64
9 | Purdue | 40
5 | Georgetown | 79
4 | Maryland | 57
6 | Penn State | 73
3 | DePaul | 75
10 | Marist | 66
2 | Duke | 71

Regional semifinals March 27
1 | Connecticut | 68
5 | Georgetown | 63
3 | DePaul | 63
2 | Duke | 70

Regional Finals; March 29
1 | Connecticut | 75
2 | Duke | 40

=== Dayton Region ===
First round March 19–20
1 | Tennessee | 99
16 | Stetson | 34
Knoxville, TN
8 | Marquette | 68
9 | Texas | 65
5 | Georgia Tech | 69
12 | Bowling Green | 58
Columbus, OH
4 | Ohio State | 80
13 | UCF | 69
6 | Oklahoma | 86
11 | James Madison | 72
Charlottesville, VA
3 | Miami (FL) | 80
14 | Gardner–Webb | 62
7 | Arizona State | 45
10 | Temple | 63
Salt Lake City, UT
2 | Notre Dame | 67
15 | Utah | 54

Second round March 21–22
1 | Tennessee | 79
8 | Marquette | 70
5 | Georgia Tech | 60
4 | Ohio State | 67
6 | Oklahoma | 88
3 | Miami (FL) | 83
10 | Temple | 64
2 | Notre Dame | 77

Regional semifinals March 26
1 | Tennessee | 85
4 | Ohio State | 75
6 | Oklahoma | 53
2 | Notre Dame | 78

Regional Finals; March 28
1 | Tennessee | 59
2 | Notre Dame | 73

=== Spokane Region ===
First round March 19–20
1 | Stanford | 86
16 | UC Davis | 59
Stanford, CA
8 | Texas Tech | 50
9 | St. John's | 55
5 | North Carolina | 82
12 | Fresno State | 68
Albuquerque, NM
4 | Kentucky | 66*
13 | Hampton | 62
6 | Iowa | 86
11 | Gonzaga | 92
Spokane, WA
3 | UCLA | 55
14 | Montana | 47
7 | Louisville | 81
10 | Vanderbilt | 62
Cincinnati, OH
2 | Xavier | 72
15 | South Dakota State | 56

Second round March 21–22
1 | Stanford | 75
9 | St. John's | 49
5 | North Carolina | 86
4 | Kentucky | 74
11 | Gonzaga | 89
3 | UCLA | 75
7 | Louisville | 85
2 | Xavier | 75

Regional semifinals March 26
1 | Stanford | 72
5 | North Carolina | 65
11 | Gonzaga | 76
7 | Louisville | 69

Regional Finals; March 28
1 | Stanford | 83
11 | Gonzaga | 60

=== Dallas Region ===
First round March 20
1 | Baylor | 66
16 | Prairie View A&M | 30
Waco, TX
8 | Houston | 73
9 | West Virginia | 78
5 | Green Bay | 59
12 | Arkansas–Little Rock | 55
Wichita, KS
4 | Michigan State | 69
13 | Northern Iowa | 66
6 | Georgia | 56
11 | Middle Tennessee | 41
Auburn, AL
3 | Florida State | 76
14 | Samford | 46
7 | Rutgers | 76
10 | Louisiana Tech | 51
Bossier City, LA
2 | Texas A&M | 87
15 | McNeese State | 47

Second round March 22
1 | Baylor | 82
9 | West Virginia | 68
5 | Green Bay | 65
4 | Michigan State | 56
6 | Georgia | 61
3 | Florida State | 59
7 | Rutgers | 48
2 | Texas A&M | 70

Regional semifinals March 27
1 | Baylor | 86
5 | Green Bay | 76
6 | Georgia | 38
2 | Texas A&M | 79

Regional Finals; March 29
1 | Baylor | 46
2 | Texas A&M | 58

=== Final Four – Indianapolis, Indiana ===
National semifinals April 3
P1 | Connecticut | 63
DT2 | Notre Dame | 72
S1 | Stanford | 62
DL2 | Texas A&M | 63

National Championship Game; April 5
DT2 | Notre Dame | 70
DL2 | Texas A&M | 76

== Record by conference ==
| Conference | # of bids | Record | Win % | Round of 32 | Sweet Sixteen | Elite Eight | Final Four | Championship game |
|---|---|---|---|---|---|---|---|---|
| Big East | 9 | 19–9 | .679 | 9 | 5 | 2 | 2 | 1 |
| Big 12 | 7 | 11–6 | .647 | 3 | 3 | 2 | 1 | 1 |
| ACC | 6 | 9–6 | .600 | 6 | 2 | 1 | – | – |
| Big Ten | 5 | 5–5 | .500 | 4 | 1 | – | – | – |
| SEC | 4 | 6–4 | .600 | 3 | 2 | 1 | – | – |
| Pac-10 | 3 | 5–3 | .625 | 2 | 1 | 1 | 1 | – |
| Atlantic 10 | 3 | 2–3 | .400 | 2 | – | – | – | – |
| Conference USA | 2 | 0–2 | .000 | – | – | – | – | – |
| Sun Belt | 2 | 0–2 | .000 | – | – | – | – | – |
| WAC | 2 | 0–2 | .000 | – | – | – | – | – |
| Horizon | 1 | 2–1 | .500 | 1 | 1 | – | – | – |
| West Coast | 1 | 3–1 | .750 | 1 | 1 | 1 | – | – |
| MAAC | 1 | 1–1 | .500 | 1 | – | – | – | – |

Eighteen conferences went 0–1: the America East, Atlantic Sun, Big Sky, Big South, Big West, Colonial, Ivy League, MEAC, MAC, Missouri Valley, Mountain West, Northeast, Ohio Valley, Patriot, Southern, Southland, SWAC and the Summit.

== All-Tournament team ==
- Danielle Adams, Texas A&M
- Skylar Diggins, Notre Dame
- Maya Moore, Connecticut
- Tyra White, Texas A&M
- Devereaux Peters, Notre Dame

== Game officials ==
- Lisa Jones (semifinal)
- Felicia Grinter (semifinal)
- Denise Brooks (semifinal)
- Lisa Mattingly (semifinal)
- Cameron Inouye (semifinal)
- Susan Blauch (semifinal)
- Dee Kantner (final)
- Tina Napier (final)
- Michael Price (final)

== Media coverage ==
=== Television ===
ESPN had US television rights to all games during the tournament. For the first and second round, ESPN aired select games nationally on ESPN or ESPNU. All other games were aired regionally on ESPN2 and streamed online via ESPN3. Most of the nation got whip-around coverage during this time, which allowed ESPN to rotate between the games and focus the nation on the one that was the closest. The regional semifinals were split between ESPN and ESPN2, and ESPN aired the regional finals, national semifinals, and championship match.

==== Studio host & analysts ====
- Trey Wingo (host)
- Kara Lawson (analyst)
- Carolyn Peck (analyst)

==== Commentary teams ====
First & second rounds Saturday/Monday

- Jon Sciambi and Stephen Bardo – Columbus, OH
- Dave Flemming and Kayte Christensen – Durham, NC
- Dave O'Brien and Debbie Antonelli – Knoxville, TN
- Justin Kutcher and Brenda VanLengen – University Park, PA
- Clay Matvick and Tamika Raymond – Albuquerque, NM
- Holly Rowe and Sean Farnham – Salt Lake City, UT
- Marc Kestecher and Krista Blunk – Spokane, WA
- Dave Pasch and Mary Murphy – Stanford, CA

Sweet Sixteen & Elite Eight Saturday/Monday

- Dave Flemming, Rebecca Lobo, and Todd Harris – Dayton, OH
- Dave Pasch, Debbie Antonelli, and Heather Cox – Spokane, WA

Final Four

- Dave O'Brien, Doris Burke, Rebecca Lobo, and Holly Rowe – Indianapolis, IN

First & second rounds Sunday/Tuesday

- Beth Mowins and Rosalyn Gold-Onwude – Charlottesville, VA
- Bob Wischusen and Brooke Weisbrod – Cincinnati, OH
- Bob Picozzi and Rebecca Lobo – College Park, MD
- Mark Jones and Doris Burke – Storrs, CT
- Cara Capuano and LaChina Robinson – Auburn, AL
- Carter Blackburn and Fran Fraschilla – Shreveport, LA
- Pam Ward and Stephanie White – Waco, TX
- Dan McLaughlin and Abby Waner – Wichita, KS

Sweet Sixteen & Elite Eight Sunday/Tuesday

- Dave O'Brien, Doris Burke, and Holly Rowe – Philadelphia, PA
- Pam Ward, Stephanie White, and Beth Mowins – Dallas, TX

Championship

- Dave O'Brien, Doris Burke, Rebecca Lobo, and Holly Rowe – Indianapolis, IN

== See also ==
- NCAA Women's Division I Basketball Championship
- 2011 NCAA Women's Division II basketball tournament
- 2011 Women's National Invitation Tournament
- 2011 Women's Basketball Invitational
- 2011 NCAA Division I men's basketball tournament
- 2011 NAIA Division I men's basketball tournament
- 2011 NAIA Division II men's basketball tournament
