= Audi Crooks =

American basketball player (born 2004)

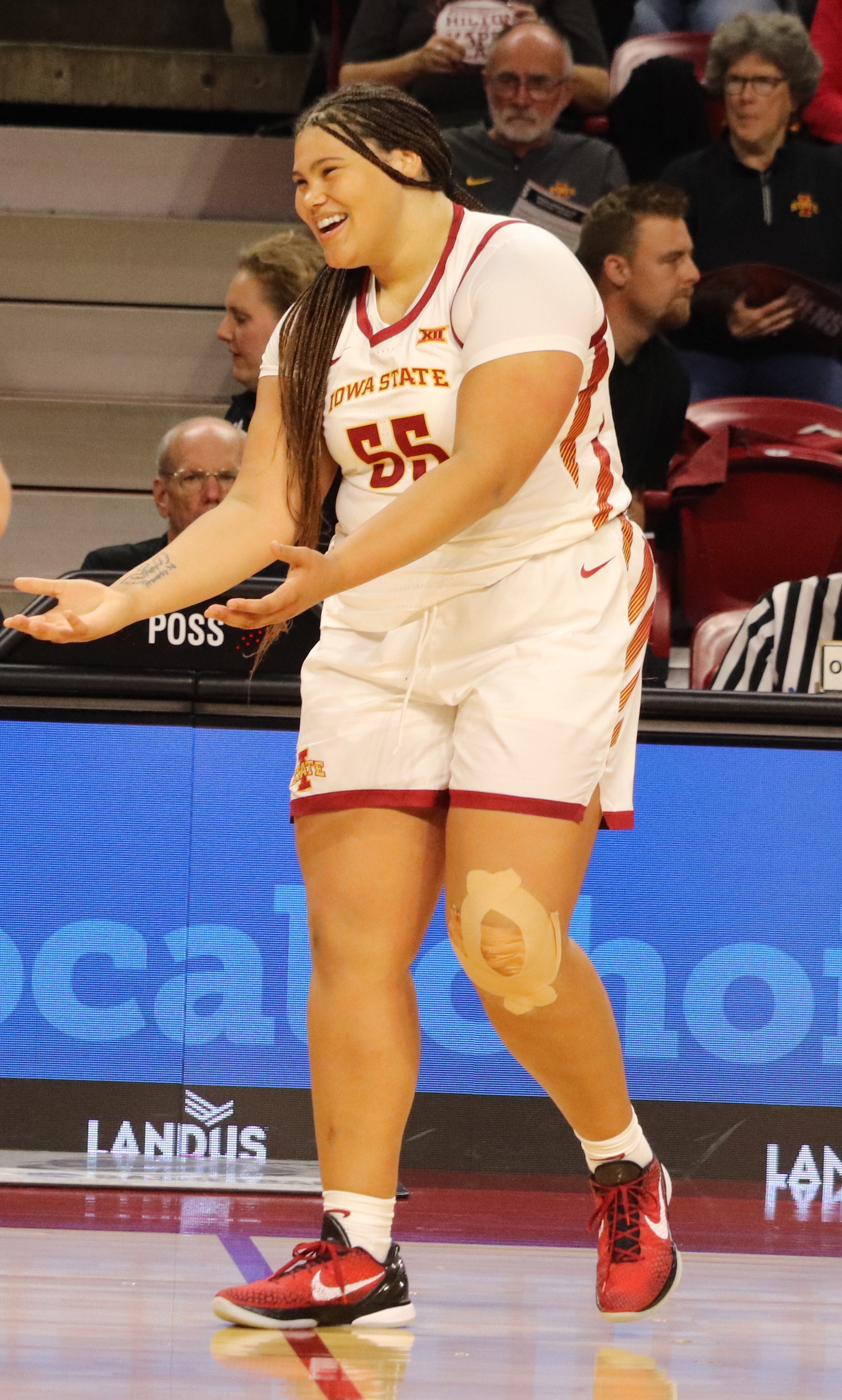
- Crooks with the Iowa State Cyclones in 2024.

No. 55 – Oklahoma State Cowgirls
- Position: Center
- League: Big 12 Conference

Personal information
- Born: December 13, 2004 (age 21)
- Listed height: 6 ft 3 in (1.91 m)

Career information
- High school: Bishop Garrigan (Algona, Iowa)
- College: Iowa State (2023–2026); Oklahoma State (2026–present)

Career highlights
- Second-team All-American – AP, USBWA (2026); Third-team All-American – USBWA (2025); 3× First-team All-Big 12 (2024–2026); Big 12 All-Freshman Team (2024); Iowa Miss Basketball (2023)
Medals
Women's basketball
Representing United States
FIBA AmeriCup
Gold medal – first place	2025 Chile

Audi Rae Crooks (born December 13, 2004) is an American college basketball player for the Oklahoma State Cowgirls of the Big 12 Conference. She plays the center position.

Crooks attended Bishop Garrigan High School in her hometown of Algona, Iowa, where she won back-to-back state titles and was named Iowa Miss Basketball as a senior. A four-star recruit, she left as the state's all-time leader in field goals made, as well as the state tournament's all-time leader in points and rebounds. Crooks also won four state titles in track and field, including three straight in the shot put.

As a freshman at Iowa State, Crooks scored 40 points against Maryland in the first round of the 2024 NCAA tournament, setting a new single-game tournament record for freshmen. She was an All-Big 12 Conference first team selection and received an All-American honorable mention recognition from the Associated Press.

== High school career ==
Crooks attended Bishop Garrigan High School in Algona, Iowa, where she starred on the school's basketball team. As a freshman, she averaged 23.2 points and 11.9 rebounds per game and broke state freshman records in points scored (626) and field goals made (270) while helping Bishop Garrigan achieve a 25–2 record. Crooks also set a new school record for single-season field goal percentage (70.7), which was previously held by her mother. Crooks scored a season-high 40 points in a 73–33 win over Humboldt, shooting 17-for-23 from the field. At the Class 1A state tournament, Crooks was named team captain of the all-tournament team after averaging 25.3 points and 15 rebounds per game. Bishop Garrigan lost the title game against two-time defending champions Newell-Fonda, with Crooks recording 34 points and 17 rebounds in the defeat. She was ultimately named Class 1A Player of the Year and first-team all-state. Crooks and Molly Joyce were the first pair of freshman teammates in state history to make the all-state first team.

As a sophomore, Crooks averaged 20.7 points, 10.6 rebounds, and 4.0 blocks per game, leading the Golden Bears to another 25–2 record. She led the state in made field goals (224) while shooting 70.4 percent from the field, once again earning first-team all-state honors. Bishop Garrigan entered the state tournament as the top seed but lost to Newell-Fonda again in the final, with Crooks adding 25 points and 10 rebounds in the championship game. As a junior, Crooks recorded 23.5 points, 12.5 rebounds and 3.3 blocks per game while shooting 72.2 percent from the field. She also scored a school-record 44 points in a win over North Union. Crooks earned first-team all-state honors for the third consecutive year after leading Bishop Garrigan to a 25–3 record and its first-ever Class 1A state title. She recorded 15 points and 13 rebounds in the title game against MMCRU, becoming the state tournament's all-time leading rebounder in only nine games. Crooks was named the Iowa female athlete of the year by The Des Moines Register.

As a senior, Crooks averaged 32.9 points, 13.3 rebounds, 2.4 assists, and 2.8 blocks per game, breaking the single-season state scoring record while shooting 75.2 percent from the field. She was named Iowa Miss Basketball, the Des Moines Register All-Iowa Girls Basketball Player of the year, and earned first-team all-state honors for the fourth time, after leading the Bears to a 26–1 record and their second consecutive state title. In the quarterfinals of the Class 1A state tournament, Crooks tallied 42 points on 20-of-25 shooting, along with 14 rebounds and three blocks, to help beat Martensdale-St Marys 67–44. Her 42 points broke the single-game 1A tournament scoring record and made her the state tournament's all-time leading scorer across all classes. Crooks recorded 26 points on 10-of-11 shooting and 10 rebounds and led Bishop Garrigan to a 73–39 blowout win over Remsen St. Mary's in the semifinals. In the championship game, a 68–57 victory over Newell-Fonda, she broke her own tournament record by scoring 49 points on 21-of-27 shooting, along with 16 rebounds and three blocks. Crooks was named team captain of the all-tournament team after she averaged 27.6 points and 13.3 rebounds per game, breaking the records for total points (117) and rebounds (45) in a single tournament. The Des Moines Register called it "the most dominant state tournament run in Iowa 5-on-5 history". Crooks also finished as the state tournament's all-time leader in points (332) and rebounds (160).

Crooks led Bishop Garrigan to an 101–8 record in her four years on the team. She recorded 2,734 points and 1,339 rebounds in her high school career, finishing third all-time in state history in both categories. Crooks also set the all-time mark in field goals made (1,195) and finished second in field goal percentage (72.4). She also competed on the Amateur Athletic Union (AAU) circuit for CY Select Wolves. Aside from basketball, Crooks won four state titles in track and field. She captured the Class 1A state title in the shot put as a sophomore after her freshman season was canceled due to the COVID-19 pandemic. Crooks repeated the feat as a junior, breaking the Class 1A record with a throw of 45 ft 1 in (13.74 m), and won the discus throw state title the following day. As a senior, she became the first athlete in Class 1A history to win three consecutive state titles in the shot put. Crooks also played volleyball at Bishop Garrigan, earning first- and second-team all-conference honors during her junior and senior seasons, respectively.

=== Recruiting ===
Crooks was rated as a four-star recruit and was considered among the best high school prospects of the 2023 class. She was ranked as the no. 42 overall recruit by Prep Girls Hoops, as well as no. 57 by ESPN. Crooks received her first Division I offer from Illinois State in July 2020. By that September she had received offers from all four Division I programs in Iowa (Iowa, Iowa State, Northern Iowa, and Drake) as well as Maryland. The following year, Crooks received offers from Minnesota, Michigan State, Wisconsin, Kansas State, Mississippi State, Penn State and Oklahoma. She committed to Iowa State on April 14, 2022. Crooks was reportedly "vigorously" recruited by Iowa State head coach Bill Fennelly. She signed her National Letter of Intent on November 9, joining one of the highest-ranked recruiting classes in program history.

== College career ==
=== Iowa State ===
You’re kind of fascinated because... you don’t almost ever see a player with her frame who can move like she can move who has the feet and the hands she has. She’s kind of effective using her size and embracing her size and physicality that she has.

— Rebecca Lobo on Crooks during her freshman season

Crooks entered her freshman season as Iowa State's backup center behind Isnelle Natabou, and made her collegiate debut on November 6, 2023, recording eight points and five rebounds in a 82–55 win over Butler. In her second game, on November 12, she led her team in scoring with 23 points on 7-of-9 shooting in an 85–73 loss to Drake. It was the most points scored off the bench by an Iowa State player since Kidd Blaskowsky in 2014. Crooks was named a starter for the first time ahead of the Cyclones' game against Syracuse on November 25 after having averaged a team-high 16.8 points per game through the first four games of the season. In her first career start, she posted 23 points and four rebounds on 10-of-12 shooting in an 81–69 defeat to the Orange.

Crooks registered her first double-double during Iowa State's in-state rivalry matchup against AP No. 4 Iowa on December 6, tallying 15 points and 10 rebounds despite being double- and triple-teamed. She also made her first career three-point shot in the second quarter of the 67–58 loss. Crooks earned praise from Iowa coach Lisa Bluder, who called her a "great player" following the game, as well as analyst and former player Rebecca Lobo, who compared her to four-time WNBA All-Star Natalie Williams. On December 17, Crooks recorded 21 points and nine rebounds on nine-of-10 shooting to lead the Cyclones to a 105–68 blowout win over Troy. One day later, she was named the Big 12 Conference Freshman of the Week. Crooks scored 21 points to go with seven rebounds in their conference opener, a 76–68 win against Oklahoma State on December 31, and was named the Big 12 Freshman of the Week for the second time in three weeks. On January 10, 2024, Crooks recorded 22 points and 11 rebounds to help Iowa State overcome a 19-point deficit en route to a 74–64 upset victory over AP No. 24 West Virginia. Three days later she scored 23 points, including the game-winning basket, to lead her team to another comeback win, this time overcoming a 13-point deficit to upset AP No. 4 Baylor 66–63. It was the first time since 2009–2010 that the Cyclones had beaten ranked opponents in consecutive games. Crooks was named the Big 12 Player of the Week, becoming the first Iowa State freshman to ever win the award.

On January 24, Crooks tallied 25 points and eight rebounds in a 60–58 defeat to Kansas. Three days later, she scored 25 points and grabbed a season-high 16 rebounds in an 84–78 loss to AP No. 24 West Virginia. Crooks earned Big 12 Freshman of the Week honors for the third time that season. In her next game, on January 31, Crooks posted 29 points and eight rebounds in a 78–67 win over Oklahoma State, setting the program single-game freshman record with 14 made field goals. On February 14, she recorded 20 points, nine rebounds, and a season-high three steals in a 96–93 double overtime victory over AP No. 7 Kansas State. Three days later, Crooks scored 24 points in an 81–60 loss to AP No. 5 Texas. In her next game, on February 21, she tallied 25 points and 12 rebounds on nine-of-11 shooting in a 76–64 win over Houston. On February 24, Crooks scored 18 points and grabbed nine rebounds in a 74–49 victory over BYU. During the first quarter of the game, she set the Cyclone single-season freshman scoring record, surpassing Megan Taylor's 460 points mark set in 1997–98. Crooks was recognized as the Big 12 Player and Freshman of the Week for her performances against Houston and BYU, becoming the first player in program history to sweep both awards in the same week. In their final regular season game, Crooks posted 22 points and 10 rebounds on nine-of-10 shooting to lead the Cyclones to a 76–60 win over Cincinnati. She was a unanimous first-team all-Big 12 selection by the league's coaches, becoming the first freshman in program history to earn the honor.

Crooks helped Iowa State achieve a runner-up finish at the Big 12 Conference tournament. She contributed 23 points, including the game-winning basket, in their 67–62 win over AP No. 17 Baylor in the quarterfinals, followed by a 25-point, nine-rebound performance in an 85–68 victory over AP No. 17 Oklahoma in the semifinals. However, the Cyclones suffered a 70–53 defeat to Texas in the championship game; Crooks recorded 25 points and nine rebounds in the loss and was named to the all-tournament team. In the first round of the NCAA tournament, she posted a career-high 40 points, 12 rebounds, and two blocks on 18-of-20 shooting in a 93–86 comeback win over Maryland after having trailed by 20 points. Her 40-point outing gave her the fourth-most points in a game in program history – only behind Lindsey Wilson, Ashley Joens, and Tonya Burns – as well as the most ever by a freshman. Crooks also surpassed the program record for field goals made in a single season, which was previously set by Bridget Carleton in 2018–19, and tied the single-game record. In the second round, she recorded 10 points and eight rebounds before fouling out in an 87–81 overtime loss to Stanford. As a freshman, Crooks averaged 19.2 points and 7.8 rebounds per game on 65.5 percent shooting. She set the program single-season record for field goals made (158), as well as program single-season freshman records for points (635) and free throws made (114). Crooks was named an honorable mention All-American by the Associated Press (AP) – the first freshman in program history to earn the accolade.

As a junior in November 2025, she set a new record for points scored in one Iowa State basketball game, scoring 43 points despite only playing approximately twenty minutes and, according to herself, not feeling well.

=== Oklahoma State ===
After the 2025–26 season, Crooks was one of nine players to seek a transfer out of Iowa State and became one of the most coveted players in the transfer portal. She announced on April 19, 2026, that she had committed to Oklahoma State, remaining in the Big 12 Conference with a team featuring an overhauled roster.

== Career statistics ==
Legend
GP	Games played	GS	Games started	MPG	Minutes per game	RPG	Rebounds per game
APG	Assists per game	SPG	Steals per game	BPG	Blocks per game	PPG	Points per game
TO	Turnovers per game	FG%	Field-goal percentage	3P%	3-point field-goal percentage	FT%	Free-throw percentage
**Bold**	Career best	°	League leader

=== College ===
Audi Crooks college statistics
Year	Team	GP	GS	MPG	FG%	3P%	FT%	RPG	APG	SPG	BPG	TO	PPG
2023–24	Iowa State	33	29	26.2	57.7	**31.3**	65.5	**7.8**	1.0	**0.5**	0.5	**2.5**	19.2
2024–25	Iowa State	**35**	**35**	**29.1**	**60.5°**	0.0	**68.4**	7.5	**1.5**	0.3	**0.7**	2.8	**23.4**°
Career		68	64	27.6	59.2	17.2	67.2	7.6	1.3	0.4	0.6	2.6	21.4
Statistics retrieved from Sports-Reference.

== Personal life ==
Crooks comes from an athletic family. Her father, Jimmie Crooks, starred at Fort Dodge Senior High School before playing college basketball at Mankato State and Southern Nazarene. Crooks visited him every weekend in Fort Dodge until he died in 2021; she later got a tattoo on her right arm in his memory. Her mother, Michelle Cook (née Vitzthum), is one of the all-time leading scorers for the Bishop Garrigan basketball team. Crooks grew up playing basketball against her mother on a hoop in their driveway in Algona and honors both of her parents by wearing their No. 55 jersey. Her uncle, Matt Vitzthum, is the head coach at the University of South Dakota.

Crooks participated in jazz choir and played trumpet in the school band at Bishop Garrigan. She also played drums in church. She had learned to play from her father when she was a child. As a freshman at Iowa State, Crooks admitted to playing the drums at Hilton Coliseum when left unattended by the band. "I just mess around before practice. Music is fun for me," she said. As of 2024, Crooks is majoring in criminal justice and sociology.

=== Business interests ===
In March 2024, Crooks signed a multiyear Name, Image and Likeness (NIL) deal with ClaimDOC, a medical claim auditing company based in West Des Moines, Iowa, and was featured in an advertisement at the Des Moines International Airport.

On July 21, 2025, Crooks was signed by Unrivaled, a 3x3 basketball league, to NIL deals as part of "The Future is Unrivaled Class of 2025".
