= List of Iowa State Cyclones head basketball coaches =

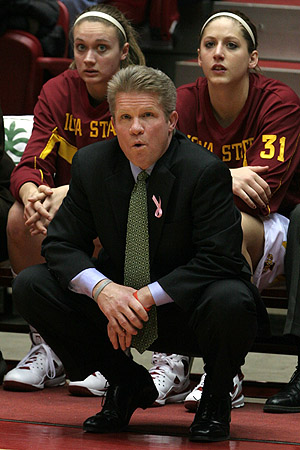
Bill Fennelly, the current head coach of the women's team

The Iowa State Cyclones men's basketball and women's basketball programs compete at the Division I level of the National Collegiate Athletic Association (NCAA), representing Iowa State University in the Big 12 Conference.

The men's program has been led by 20 head coaches since its organization in 1908. In its 102 years, the team has played over 2300 games and made thirteen appearances in the NCAA Tournament, including a Final Four appearance in 1944. Johnny Orr is the all-time leader in games coached and wins. Fred Hoiberg is the all-time leader in winning percentage. Statistically, Ken Trickey has been the least successful coach of the Cyclone men, with a winning percentage of .245. The current men's coach is T. J. Otzelberger, who was hired in June 2021.

The women's team has been led by six head coaches since it was organized in 1974. During its 38 seasons, the Cyclone women have played over 1,000 games and made ten appearances at the NCAA Tournament, including two Elite Eight appearances. Current head coach, Bill Fennelly, is the all-time leader in games coached, wins, and winning percentage. Theresa Becker, statistically, is the least successful women's coach, with a winning percentage of .222.

== Key ==
General
#	Number of coaches (Note: A running total of the number of coaches of the Cyclones. Thus, any coach who has two or more separate terms as head coach is counted only once.)
CCs	Conference championships
*	Conference-tournament champion
^	Regular-season champion
†	Elected to the Naismith Memorial Basketball Hall of Fame

Overall
GC	Games coached
OW	Wins
OL	Losses
O%	Winning percentage

Conference
CW	Wins
CL	Losses
C%	Winning percentage

Post-season
PW	Wins
PL	Losses

== Coaches ==
Statistics are correct as of the end of the 2009–10 men's and women's college basketball season.

=== Men's ===
#	Name	Term	GC	OW	OL	O%	CW	CL	C%	PW	PL	CCs	National awards
1	Clyde Williams	1908-1911	49	20	29	.408	17—	24—	.415	—	—	—	—
2	Homer C. Hubbard	1911–1915	61	21	40	.344	15	23	.395	—	—	—	—
3	H. H. Walters	1915–1919	65	27	38	.415	12	26	.316	—	—	—	—
4	Punk Berryman	1919–1920	18	6	12	.333	2	10	.167			—	—
5	Maury Kent	1920–1921	18	10	8	.556	6	8	.429	—	—	—	—
6	Bill Chandler	1921–1928	125	39	86	.312	31	77	.287	—	—	—	—
7	Louis Menze	1928–1947	319	166	153	.520	82	108	.432	1	2	2 - 1935^, 1941^, 1944^, 1945^ (all Big Six)	—
8	Clayton Sutherland	1947–1954	152	63	89	.414	23	49	.319	—	—	—	—
9	Bill Strannigan	1954–1959	115	69	46	.600	32	42	.432	-	-	1 – 1955* (Big Seven)	—
10	Glen Anderson	1959–1971	303	142	161	.469	77	91	.458	-	-	1 – 1959* (Big 8)	—
11	Maury John	1971-1973	57	32	25	.561	12	16	.429	0-	0-	—Left team after (4-1) Gus Guydon 11-10 Interim	—
12	Ken Trickey	1973-1976	53	13	40	.245	7	21	.250	-	-	—	—
13	Lynn Nance	1976-1980	108	44	64	.407	23	33	.411	—	—	—	—
14	Johnny Orr	1980-1994	418	218	200	.522	79	117	.403	3	7	—	—
15	Tim Floyd	1994-1998	128	81	47	.633	35	33	.515	4	3	1 - 1996*	—
16	Larry Eustachy	1998-2003	160	102	58	.638	43	37	.538	4	3	3 - 2000^*, 2001^,	AP National Coach of the Year (2000), Henry Iba Award (2000)
17	Wayne Morgan	2003-2006	94	55	39	.585	22	26	.458	4	2	—	—
18	Greg McDermott	2006–2010	127	59	68	.465	18	46	.281	—	—	—	—
19	Fred Hoiberg	2010–2015	171	115	56	.673	49	39	.557	4	5	2 - 2014*, 2015*	—
20	Steve Prohm	2015–2021	136	83	53	.610	35	37	.486	3	2	2 - 2017*, 2019*	—
21	T. J. Otzelberger	2021–present	125	87	38	.696	36	27	.531	4	3	1 - 2024*	—

=== Women's ===
#	Name	Term	GC	OW	OL	O%	CW	CL	C%	PW	PL	CCs
1	Gloria Crosby	1974	16	8	8	.500	—	—	—	—	—	—
2	Lynn Wheeler	1975–1980	161	80	81	.497	—	—	—	—	—	—
3	Deb Oing	1981–1984	111	31	80	.279	3	23	.115	—	—	—
4	Pam Wettig	1985–1992	221	100	121	.452	35	76	.315	—	—	—
5	Theresa Becker	1993–1995	81	18	63	.222	5	37	.119	—	—	—
6	Bill Fennelly	1996–present	453	310	143	.684	133	89	.599	—	—	2 — 2000*^, 2001*
