= Iowa Miss Basketball =

State basketball award

Each year the Miss Iowa Basketball award is given to the person chosen as the best senior high school girls' basketball player in the state of Iowa, in the United States.

The award has been given since 1981. Winners were chosen by the Iowa Newspaper Association at the time of its annual All-State selections until 2018. The Iowa Print Sports Writers Association now selects the award using the same format. From 1990 to 1993, two awards were given, one for a 5-on-5 player and one for a 6-on-6 player, when girls in Iowa played in the two systems based on division. Prior to 1990 award winners played 6-on-6 basketball, and since 1993, award winners have played 5-on-5 basketball.

Voting is done on a points system. Each voter selects first, second, and third-place votes. A player receives five points for each first-place vote, three points for each second-place vote, and one point for a third-place vote. The player who receives the most points receives the award.

== Award winners ==
Year	Player	High school	College	Notes
2025	Libby Fandel	Xavier	Kansas	
2024	Callie Levin	Solon	University of Iowa (2024-2026); University of Northern Iowa (2026-present)	Career high school stats: 1,984 points, 535 rebounds, 412 assists and 417 steals (22 PPG, 6.9 RPG, 4.5 APG, 4.8 SPG as a senior); Career and single-season 3-point record holder at Solon High School (records previously held by Solon alum and All-Big Ten Iowa Hawkeye Lindsey Meder). Ranked #1 PG in Iowa (class of 2024) by Prep Girls Hoops; Ranked #26 Guard in the U.S. (#100 overall) by Jr. All-Star Basketball. 2024 McDonald’s All-America Nominee; 2024 USA TODAY Iowa Basketball Player of the Year; 2024 SB Live/Sports Illustrated Iowa Basketball Player of the Year; 2024 Cedar Rapids Gazette All-Area Player of the Year; 2024 Class 3A State Champion, 2024 3A State All-Tournament Team, 2024 3A State Tournament Top Producer Award (27 pts, 5 assists, 7 rebounds in 3A championship game). 4x IBCA 1st Team All-State (three years in 3A and one year in 4A); 3x IPSWA 1st Team All-State (1x 2nd Team All-State as a freshman); 4x Unanimous 1st Team All-Conference (WaMaC East); 4x WaMaC East Conference Player of the Year; 4x IBCA All-Region (three times in 3A and once in 4A); 4x IGCA S.E. Iowa All-District (three times in 3A and once in 4A); 4x Des Moines Register All-Iowa Team (3x 1st Team and 2024 Elite Team; 4x Cedar Rapids Gazette All-Area Team.
2023	Audi Crooks	Bishop Garrigan	Iowa State University	1st-team 1A All-State in 2020, 2012, 2022, and 2023. As a freshman, she averaged 23.2 points and 11.9 rebounds per game and broke state freshman records in points scored (626) and field goals made (270) while helping Bishop Garrigan achieve a 25–2 record. Crooks scored a state-record 889 points in her senior season, a tournament record 117 points, while also breaking records for points in a game (49), career tourney points (332) and career tourney rebounds (160). She is the third-all-time leading scorer (2,734) and rebounds (1,339). Crooks ranks second all-time in career field goal percentage at .724 (1195 of 1649 from the floor). Crooks also finished with the most made field goals (1195) of any player.
2022	Hannah Stuelke	Cedar Rapids Washington	University of Iowa	1st-team 5A All-State in 2020, 2021, 2022. Iowa Gatorade Player-of-the-Year in 2022. High school career statistics: 1,793 points and 853 rebounds. As a senior, she averaged 29.1 points per game while also averaging 10.3 rebounds, 3.4 assists, 2.1 steals and 1.2 blocks.
2021	Katie Dinnebier	Waukee High School	Drake University	1st-team 5A All-State in 2020, 2021. Iowa Gatorade Player-of-the-Year in 2021.
2020	Caitlin Clark	Dowling (West Des Moines)	University of Iowa	1st-team 5A All-State in 2018, 2019, 2020. Iowa Gatorade Player-of-the-Year in 2019, 2020
2019	Zoey Young	Valley (West Des Moines)	Maryland	USA Today Iowa Player of the Year. MaxPreps 2018–19 High School Girls Basketball All-American Team
2018	Ashley Joens	Iowa City High School	Iowa State University	High school career statistics: 2,178 points. As a senior she averaged 30.7 points and 11.4 rebounds per game.
2017	Elle Ruffridge	Pocahontas Area High School	Missouri State University	For her career, Ruffridge finished atop the state's career scoring (2,951), made three-pointers (466) and assists (802) charts. She was named all-state in all four years.
2016	Makenzie Meyer	Mason City High School	University of Iowa	High school career statistics: 1,590 points, over 500 rebounds, and over 100 assists. IGHSAU 2017 Jack North Award winner.
2015	Nicole Miller	North Linn, Troy Mills	Drake University	High school career statistics: 2,207 points
2014	Alexis Conaway	MOC-Floyd Valley	Iowa State	High school career statistics: 1,902 points, 776 rebounds, 455 steals, 294 assists. State tournament single game record 46 points set in 2014. Chose volleyball at Iowa State over basketball.
2013	Ally Disterhoft	Iowa City West	University of Iowa	Iowa Gatorade Player of the Year 2013. McDonald's All-American nominee. ESPN HoopGurlz Top 100 recruit Three-time All-Big Ten performer and first-team selection as a senior, leading scorer in University of Iowa Women's Basketball history with 2,102 points.
2012	Jessie Pauley	OA-BCIG High School, Ida Grove	Northern Iowa	
2011	Kiah Stokes	Linn-Mar	UConn	2011 McDonald's, Parade Magazine, WBCA All-American; Iowa's 2010 Gatorade State Player of the Year
2010	Carli Tritz	Bishop Heelan, Sioux City	Creighton	
2009	Amanda Zimmerman	Ballard, Huxley	Iowa State University	McDonald's All-America nominee
2008	Jennifer Jorgensen	Southeast Webster-Grand, Burnside	University of the Pacific, Grand View University	3 time All-American at Grand View, 3 time all Midwest Collegiate Conference first team selection, 2 time MCC Player of the Year. 2012 Cosida Academic All American of the Year. 2012 NAIA Division II National Women's Basketball Player of the Year, 2708 Career Points for SEW-Grand, 1184 rebounds, 621 assists. Scored 2034 points in 3 seasons at Grand View after leaving Pacific
2007	Kelsey Bolte	Battle Creek-Ida Grove	Iowa State University	Iowa Gatorade Player of the Year 2007, WBCA High School All-American 2007
2006	Shellie Mosman	Carroll	Iowa State University	McDonald's All-America nominee
2005	Wendy Ausdemore	Tri-Center, Neola	University of Iowa	
2004	Jamie Boyd	Underwood	University of Kansas	
2003	Deb Remmerde	Rock Valley	Northwestern College (Iowa)	133 consecutive free throws in 2006 are the most at any level of organized basketball
2002	Linda Sayavongchanh	Des Moines Lincoln	Drake University	Assistant coach for Creighton women's basketball. Former assistant at University of North Dakota
2001	Stephanie Rich	Washington	University of Wisconsin	Head Girls Basketball Coach at Williamsburg High School in Williamsburg, IA.
2000	Anne O'Neil	Cedar Rapids Kennedy	Illinois, Iowa State	2005 Iowa State Female Athlete of the Year. Finished her career as ISU's all-time leader in free throw percentage. Sacramento Monarchs (WNBA) 2006.
1999	Nina Smith	Waterloo West	University of Wisconsin, Iowa State University	1999 High School Player of the Year (USA Today, Parade Magazine)
1998	Sara Stribe	Carroll	Drake University	Played volleyball at Iowa State
1997	Randi Peterson	Cedar Falls	University of Iowa	Coach at University of Minnesota Morris (2004–2006). Head Coach Coe College
1996	Tammi Blackstone	Cherokee	Drake University	High School All-American (Nike, Parade, Street & Smith). Missouri Valley Conference Women's Basketball All-Centennial – 35 Greatest Players
1995	Amy Herrig	Dubuque Senior	University of Iowa	In 1995 she was a first-team Parade Magazine All-American, USA Today All-USA High School Girls' Basketball Team and a second-team Street & Smith's All-American. Blue Star Index named her the second best post player in the nation and eighth best player overall. Utah Starzz (WNBA) (2000–2002)
1994	Alison Lucy	Treynor	University of Missouri	
1993 (5)	Karen Schulte	Cedar Rapids Jefferson	Drake University	
1993 (6)	Lisa Brinkmeyer	Hubbard–Radcliffe	Drake University	Girls' basketball administrator for the Iowa Girls High School Athletic Union
1992 (5)	Kate Galligan	Cedar Rapids Jefferson	Nebraska	Ranks second on the Husker all-time list with 145 made three-pointers in her four-year career
1992 (6)	Missy Miller	Colo-Nesco	Creighton University	
1991 (5)	Barb Franke	Cedar Falls	Wisconsin	UW Hall of Fame 2005
1991 (6)	Stacey Paskert	Emmetsburg	Creighton University	
1990 (5)	Michelle Nason	Iowa City High School	Bradley University	Associate head coach at Marquette University
1990 (6)	Shelby Petersen	Graettinger	University of South Dakota	First-team All-American in 1993. Named Academic All-NCC in 1992-93 and All-NCC in 1992-93. Mayer averaged 13.9 points in 107 games, Inducted into the Coyote Sports Hall of Fame in 2007.
1989	Molly Goodenbour	Waterloo West	Stanford	Played professionally. Currently coach at California State University, Dominguez Hills
1988	Molly Tideback	Waterloo Columbus	UCLA, University of Iowa	Played professionally in the WNBA and in Europe
1987	Lynne Lorenzen	Ventura	Iowa State	Naismith Prep Player of the Year Award 1987. All-time leading scorer in United States prep basketball history. Scored 100 points in a game
1986	Jenni Fitzgerald	North Scott, Eldridge	Drake University	Assistant coach, women's basketball, University of Iowa
1985	Kris Huffman	Fort Dodge	Northern Iowa	Head Women's Basketball Coach, DePauw University; NCAA Champions 2007
1984	Roxanne Wellner	Vinton-Shellsburg		1984 National High School Athletic Association's Girls Basketball All American Team
1983				
1982	Lisa Becker	Cedar Rapids Jefferson	Iowa	Played on USA Women's R. William Jones Cup Team in 1985. Mother of Michael Porter, Jr.
1981	Connie Yori	Ankeny	Creighton	Head coach for women's basketball at Nebraska from 2002 to 2016. Naismith College Coach of the Year in 2009–10.

=== Schools with multiple winners ===
School	Number of Awards	Years
Cedar Rapids Jefferson	3	1993, 1992, 1982
Battle Creek-Ida Grove	2	2012, 2007
Carroll	2	2006, 1998
Cedar Falls	2	1991, 1997
Iowa City High School	2	1990, 2018
