= Landen Akers =

American football player (born 1997)

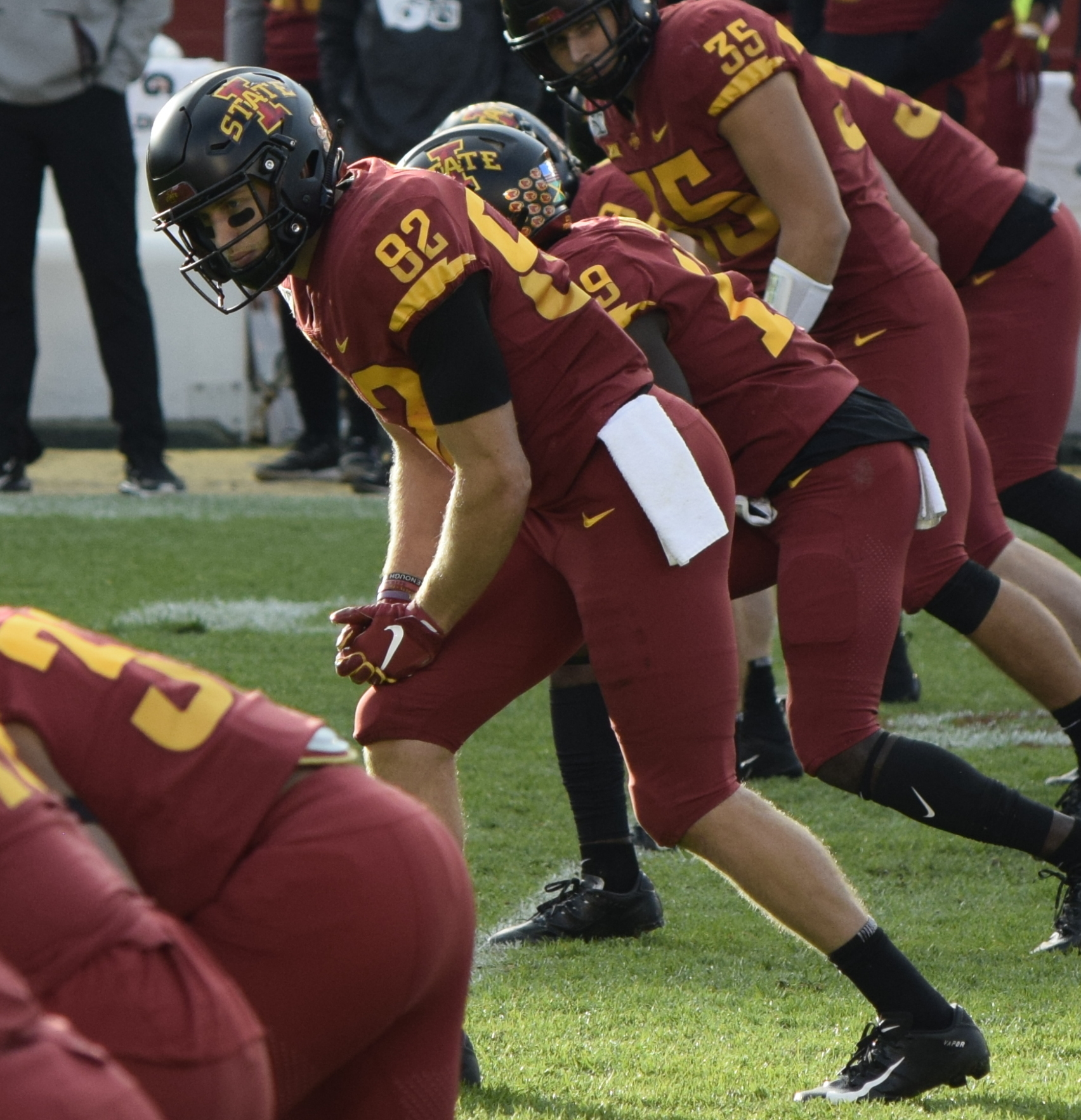
- Akers with the Iowa State Cyclones in 2019

Profile
- Position: Wide receiver

Personal information
- Born: July 7, 1997 (age 29); Cedar Rapids, Iowa, U.S.
- Listed height: 6 ft 0 in (1.83 m)
- Listed weight: 191 lb (87 kg)

Career information
- High school: Washington (Cedar Rapids, Iowa)
- College: Iowa State (2016–2020)
- NFL draft: 2021: undrafted

Career history
- Los Angeles Rams (2021); San Antonio Brahmas (2023); Houston Roughnecks (2024)*; San Antonio Brahmas (2024)
- * Offseason or practice squad member only

Awards and highlights
- Super Bowl champion (LVI)
- Stats at Pro Football Reference

Landen Akers (born July 7, 1997) is an American professional football wide receiver. He played college football at Iowa State.

== Early life ==
Akers grew up in Cedar Rapids, Iowa, and attended Washington High School, where he played baseball and football and ran track. He was named second-team Class 4A All-State as a senior after gaining 1,320 all-purpose yards and scoring 11 total touchdowns.

== College career ==
Akers was a member of the Iowa State Cyclones for six seasons, greyshirting his first year at the school redshirting the next season. As a senior, he caught 18 passes for 269 yards with one touchdown. Akers finished his college career with 38 receptions for 593 yards and one touchdown in 48 games played.

== Professional career ==
Pre-draft measurables
Height	Weight	Arm length	Hand span	40-yard dash	10-yard split	20-yard split	20-yard shuttle	Three-cone drill	Vertical jump	Broad jump	Bench press
5 ft 11 5/8 in (1.82 m)	189 lb (86 kg)	32 in (0.81 m)	9 1/8 in (0.23 m)	4.53 s	1.60 s	2.58 s	4.40 s	7.17 s	39.0 in (0.99 m)	10 ft 7 in (3.23 m)	14 reps
All values from Pro Day

=== Los Angeles Rams ===
Akers was signed by the Los Angeles Rams as an undrafted free agent on May 14, 2021. He was waived during final roster cuts on August 31, 2021, but was signed to the team's practice squad the next day. Akers was elevated to the active roster on November 28, 2021, for the team's Week 12 game against the Green Bay Packers. Akers won his first Super Bowl ring when the Rams defeated the Cincinnati Bengals in Super Bowl LVI.

On February 15, 2022, Akers signed a reserve/future contract with the Rams. He was waived on August 30, 2022.

=== San Antonio Brahmas (first stint) ===
On November 17, 2022, Akers was drafted by the San Antonio Brahmas of the XFL. He was placed on the reserve list by the team on February 21, 2023, and activated on March 21.

=== Houston Roughnecks ===
On August 9, 2023, Akers was traded to the Houston Roughnecks. The Roughnecks brand was transferred to the Houston Gamblers when the XFL and United States Football League merged to create the United Football League (UFL).

=== San Antonio Brahmas (second stint) ===
On January 15, 2024, Akers was selected by the Brahmas in the seventh round of the Super Draft portion during the 2024 UFL dispersal draft. He signed with the team on January 31.
