= 2024–25 Iowa State Cyclones women's basketball team =

Iowa State University basketball team roster

2024–25 Iowa State Cyclones women's basketball

NCAA tournament, First Round
- Conference: Big 12 Conference
- Record: 23–12 (12–6 Big 12)
- Head coach: Bill Fennelly (30th season)
- Associate head coach: Jodi Steyer
- Assistant coaches: Latoja Schaben; Billy Fennelly
- Home arena: Hilton Coliseum

2024–25 Big 12 Conference women's basketball standings
	Conf.				Overall
Team	W		L	PCT	W		L	PCT
No. 6 TCU †	16	–	2	.889	34	–	4	.895
No. 14 Baylor	15	–	3	.833	28	–	8	.778
No. 17 Oklahoma State	14	–	4	.778	25	–	7	.781
No. 16 West Virginia	13	–	5	.722	25	–	8	.758
No. 19 Kansas State	13	–	5	.722	28	–	8	.778
Utah	13	–	5	.722	22	–	9	.710
Iowa State	12	–	6	.667	23	–	12	.657
Arizona	10	–	8	.556	19	–	14	.576
Colorado	9	–	9	.500	21	–	13	.618
Cincinnati	7	–	11	.389	15	–	14	.517
Kansas	6	–	12	.333	16	–	14	.533
BYU	4	–	14	.222	13	–	17	.433
UCF	4	–	14	.222	12	–	18	.400
Texas Tech	4	–	14	.222	19	–	18	.514
Arizona State	3	–	15	.167	10	–	22	.313
Houston	1	–	17	.056	5	–	25	.167
† 2025 Big 12 tournament winner Rankings from AP poll

The 2024–25 Iowa State Cyclones women's basketball team represented Iowa State University during the 2024–25 NCAA Division I women's basketball season. The Cyclones, led by thirtieth-year head coach Bill Fennelly, played their home games at the Hilton Coliseum in Ames, Iowa as members of the Big 12 Conference.

== Previous season ==
The Cyclones finished the 2023–24 season 21–12, 12–6 in Big 12 play, to finish in a tie for fourth place. As No. 4 seed in the Big 12 women's tournament, they defeated Baylor in the quarterfinals and Oklahoma in the semifinals before losing to Texas in the championship game. They received an at-large bid to the NCAA tournament as a 7th seed in the Portland Region 4 where they defeated Maryland in the first round before losing an overtime thriller to Stanford in the second round.

== Offseason ==
=== Departures ===
Iowa State departures
Name	Number	Pos.	Height	Year	Hometown	Reason for departure
Isnelle Natabou	0	C	6' 5"	Junior	Česká Lípa, Czech Republic	Transferred to FIU
Jalynn Bristow	1	F	6' 2"	Freshman	Holliday, TX	Transferred to Texas Tech
Shantavia Dawkins	4	G	5' 7"	(redshirt) Sophomore	Brampton, ON	Transferred to Dayton
Nyamer Diew	5	F	6' 2"	Senior	Marshall, MN	Transferred to Colorado
Mary Kate King	12	G	5' 3"	Junior	Dubuque, IA	Transferred to Hawaii Pacific
Hannah Belanger	13	G	5' 8"	Graduate student	Grafton, IA	Graduated

=== Incoming ===
Iowa State incoming transfers
Name	Num	Pos.	Height	Year	Hometown	Previous school
Lily Hanford	6	G	6' 2"	Junior	DePere, WI	Oregon State
Lilly Taulelei	9	C/F	6' 3"	Sophomore	Wellington, New Zealand	UMass
Mackenzie Hare	12	G	5' 9"	Junior	Naperville, IL	Marquette
Sydney Harris	25	G/F	6' 1"	Junior	Edwardsville, IL	TCU

==== Recruiting ====
College recruiting information
Name	Hometown	School	Height	Weight	Commit date
Aili Tanke; G	Johnston, IA	Johnston High School	5 ft 10 in (1.78 m)	N/A	
Aili Tanke; G	Recruit ratings: ESPN: (91)				
Overall recruit ranking:
Note: In many cases, Scout, Rivals, 247Sports, On3, and ESPN may conflict in their listings of height and weight.; In these cases, the average was taken. ESPN grades are on a 100-point scale.; Sources: "2024 Player Commits". ESPN. Archived from the original on November 27, 2024.

== Roster ==
2024–25 Iowa State Cyclones women's basketball team
Players
Coaches

Pos.	#	Name	Height	Year	Previous school	Hometown
G	2	Arianna Jackson	5 ft 9 in (1.75 m)	So	Roosevelt	Des Moines, IA
F	3	Alisa Williams	6 ft 2 in (1.88 m)	RS So	LSU	Denton, TX
G	6	Lily Hansford	6 ft 2 in (1.88 m)	Jr	Oregon State	DePere, WI
F/C	9	Lilly Taulelei	6 ft 3 in (1.91 m)	So	UMass	Wellington, New Zealand
G	11	Emily Ryan	5 ft 11 in (1.8 m)	GS	Central Plains	Claflin, KS
G	12	Mackenzie Hare	5 ft 9 in (1.75 m)	Jr	Marquette	Naperville, IL
G	22	Reagan Wilson	5 ft 8 in (1.73 m)	Fr	Noblesville	Noblesville, IN
G	23	Kelsey Joens	5 ft 10 in (1.78 m)	So	West Liberty	Iowa City, IA
F	24	Addy Brown	6 ft 2 in (1.88 m)	So	Derby	Derby, KS
G/F	25	Sydney Harris	6 ft 1 in (1.85 m)	Jr	TCU	Edwardsville, IL
G	32	Aili Tanke	5 ft 11 in (1.8 m)	Fr	Johnston	Johnston, IA
C	55	Audi Crooks	6 ft 3 in (1.91 m)	So	Bishop Garrigan	Algona, IA

Head coach

- Bill Fennelly (William Penn)

Assistant coach(es)

- Jodi Steyer (Colorado State)
- Latoja Schaben (Toledo)
- Billy Fennelly (Iowa State)

Legend

- (C) Team captain
- (S) Suspended
- (I) Ineligible
- (W) Walk-on
- Injured
- Current redshirt

Roster
Last update: December 15, 2024

== Schedule and results ==
Date time, TV	Rank^{#}	Opponent^{#}	Result	Record	High points	High rebounds	High assists	Site (attendance) city, state
Exhibition
October 30, 2024*; 6:30 p.m.	No. 8	Thomas More	W 105–53		20 – Crooks	10 – Williams	7 – Brown	Hilton Coliseum (9,931); Ames, IA
Non-conference regular season
November 4, 2024*; 11:00 a.m., ESPN+	No. 8	Chicago State	W 96–56	1–0	20 – Brown	9 – Brown	6 – Ryan	Hilton Coliseum (9,983); Ames, IA
November 7, 2024*; 6:30 p.m., ESPN+	No. 8	Indiana State	W 64–42	2–0	16 – Crooks	10 – Brown	7 – Ryan	Hilton Coliseum (9,992); Ames, IA
November 10, 2024*; 2:00 p.m., ESPN+	No. 8	Southern	W 84–56	3–0	21 – Brown	11 – Crooks	10 – Ryan	Hilton Coliseum (10,097); Ames, IA
November 14, 2024*; 6:30 p.m., ESPN+	No. 8	St. Thomas	W 80–47	4–0	26 – Crooks	8 – Crooks	13 – Ryan	Hilton Coliseum (9,951); Ames, IA
November 20, 2024*; 6:00 p.m., ESPN+	No. 8	at Northern Iowa	L 75–87	4–1	22 – Crooks	12 – Brown	6 – Ryan	McLeod Center (5,304); Cedar Falls, IA
November 24, 2024*; 2:00 p.m., ESPN+	No. 8	Drake	W 80–78	5–1	33 – Crooks	8 – Brown	12 – Ryan	Hilton Coliseum (10,368); Ames, IA
November 28, 2024*; 12:30 p.m., FOX	No. 15	vs. No. 4 South Carolina; Fort Myers Tip-Off Island Division	L 36–76	5–2	13 – Crooks	9 – Crooks	3 – Brown	Suncoast Credit Union Arena (2,122); Fort Myers, FL
November 30, 2024*; 12:30 p.m., WSN	No. 15	vs. Middle Tennessee; Fort Myers Tip-Off Island Division	W 75–59	6–2	21 – Crooks	8 – Brown	7 – Ryan	Suncoast Credit Union Arena (1,913); Fort Myers, FL
December 3, 2024*; 6:30 p.m., ESPN+	No. 20	USC Upstate	W 92–35	7–2	15 – Crooks	13 – Crooks	5 – Crooks	Hilton Coliseum (9,949); Ames, IA
December 8, 2024*; 12:00 p.m., ESPN+	No. 20	Central Michigan	W 82–56	8–2	19 – Crooks	10 – Crooks	6 – Ryan	Hilton Coliseum (10,103); Ames, IA
December 11, 2024*; 8:00 p.m., FS1	No. 18	at No. 21 Iowa; Rivalry/Iowa Corn Cy-Hawk Series	L 69–75	8–3	31 – Crooks	10 – Crooks	7 – Ryan	Carver–Hawkeye Arena (14,998); Iowa City, IA
December 15, 2024*; 5:00 p.m., ESPN+	No. 18	Eastern Illinois	W 87–55	9–3	30 – Crooks	11 – Brown	7 – Ryan	Hilton Coliseum (10,122); Ames, IA
December 17, 2024*; 7:30 p.m., FS1		vs. No. 4 UConn; Basketball Hall of Fame Women's Showcase	L 68–101	9–4	22 – Crooks	6 – Crooks	6 – tied	Mohegan Sun Arena (6,812); Uncasville, CT
Big 12 Conference regular season
December 21, 2024; 4:00 p.m., ESPN2		at Oklahoma State	L 75–81	9–5 (0–1)	28 – Crooks	11 – Crooks	8 – Brown	Gallagher-Iba Arena (3,003); Stillwater, OK
January 1, 2025; 2:00 p.m., ESPN+		Kansas	W 78–64	10–5 (1–1)	33 – Crooks	11 – Brown	6 – Ryan	Hilton Coliseum (10,807); Ames, IA
January 5, 2025; 5:30 p.m., ESPN2		Utah	L 67–75	10–6 (1–2)	29 – Crooks	8 – Crooks	8 – Brown	Hilton Coliseum (9,251); Ames, IA
January 8, 2025; 7:30 p.m., ESPN+		at Arizona State	W 90–83	11–6 (2–2)	20 – Crooks	9 – Brown	4 – Tied	Desert Financial Arena (1,640); Tempe, AZ
January 11, 2025; 3:00 p.m., ESPN+		at Arizona	W 79–58	12–6 (3–2)	24 – Harris	8 – Brown	6 – Brown	McKale Center (7,246); Tucson, AZ
January 14, 2025; 6:30 p.m., ESPN+		Texas Tech	W 71–58	13–6 (4–2)	28 – Crooks	9 – Crooks	6 – Ryan	Hilton Coliseum (9,137); Ames, IA
January 19, 2025; 12:00 p.m., FOX		at No. 20 West Virginia	L 68–82	13–7 (4–3)	19 – Brown	7 – Brown	7 – Brown	WVU Coliseum (4,444); Morgantown, WV
January 22, 2025; 6:30 p.m., ESPN+		BYU	W 82–59	14–7 (5–3)	24 – Crooks	8 – Jackson	9 – Brown	Hilton Coliseum (9,701); Ames, IA
January 25, 2025; 4:00 p.m., ESPN+		UCF	W 90–56	15–7 (6–3)	22 – Crooks	11 – Crooks	11 – Ryan	Hilton Coliseum (10,326); Ames, IA
January 30, 2025; 7:30 p.m., ESPN		at No. 11 Kansas State	L 79–87 ^{OT}	15–8 (6–4)	28 – Crooks	11 – Crooks	9 – Ryan	Bramlage Coliseum (5,497); Manhattan, KS
February 2, 2025; 3:00 p.m., FS1		No. 9 TCU	L 69–82	15–9 (6–5)	31 – Brown	6 – Tied	6 – Ryan	Hilton Coliseum (10,331); Ames, IA
February 5, 2025; 5:30 p.m., ESPN+		at Cincinnati	W 72–52	16–9 (7–5)	18 – Crooks	13 – Brown	7 – Brown	Fifth Third Arena (1,841); Cincinnati, OH
February 8, 2025; 5:00 p.m., ESPN+		Colorado	W 86–56	17–9 (8–5)	33 – Crooks	12 – Crooks	11 – Brown	Hilton Coliseum (10,081); Ames, IA
February 15, 2025; 4:00 p.m., ESPN+		at Kansas	W 86–56	18–9 (9–5)	25 – Crooks	9 – Tied	10 – Brown	Allen Fieldhouse (4,613); Lawrence, KS
February 19, 2025; 6:30 p.m., ESPN+		Houston	W 64–53	19–9 (10–5)	13 – Joens	12 – Brown	6 – Brown	Hilton Coliseum (9,047); Ames, IA
February 22, 2025; 1:30 p.m., FOX		at No. 19 Baylor	L 52–67	19–10 (10–6)	14 – Crooks	10 – Brown	7 – Brown	Foster Pavilion (4,707); Waco, TX
February 25, 2025; 6:00 p.m., ESPN+		at UCF	W 98–73	20–10 (11–6)	29 – Crooks	9 – Brown	4 – Tied	Addition Financial Arena (1,873); Orlando, FL
March 2, 2025; 3:00 p.m., ESPN2		No. 14 Kansas State	W 85–63	21–10 (12–6)	36 – Crooks	10 – Tied	10 – Ryan	Hilton Coliseum (10,728); Ames, IA
Big 12 Conference tournament
March 6, 2025; 5:30 p.m., ESPN+	(7)	vs. (15) Arizona State; Second Round	W 96–88	22–10	41 – Brown	7 – Crooks	9 – Ryan	T-Mobile Center; Kansas City, MO
March 7, 2025; 5:30 p.m., ESPN+	(7)	vs. (2) No. 17 Baylor; Quarterfinals	L 63–69	22–11	32 – Crooks	6 – Crooks	7 – Brown	T-Mobile Center; Kansas City, MO
NCAA tournament
March 19, 2025; 6:00 p.m., ESPNU	(11 B3)	vs. (11 B3) Princeton; First Four	W 68–63	23–11	27 – Crooks	7 – Tied	8 – Brown	Joyce Center (819); Notre Dame, IN
March 21, 2025; 10:30 a.m., ESPN2	(11 B3)	vs. (6 B3) Michigan; First round	L 74–80	23–12	28 – Crooks	9 – Brown	10 – Brown	Joyce Center; Notre Dame, IN
*Non-conference game. ^{#}Rankings from AP poll. (#) Tournament seedings in parentheses. All times are in Central.

== Rankings ==
Ranking movements Legend: ██ Increase in ranking ██ Decrease in ranking — = Not ranked RV = Received votes
	Week																				
Poll	Pre	1	2	3	4	5	6	7	8	9	10	11	12	13	14	15	16	17	18	19	Final
AP	8	8	8	15	20	18	RV	—	—	—	—	—	—	—	—	—	—	—	—	—	Not released
Coaches	9	8	8	15	19	17	23	RV	—	—	—	—	—	—	—	—	—	RV	RV	RV	

== See also ==
- 2024–25 Iowa State Cyclones men's basketball team
