= Tonya Burns =

American basketball player and coach

No. 42 – Iowa State Cyclones
- Position: Center
- League: Big Eight Conference

Personal information
- Listed height: 6 ft 2 in (1.88 m)

Career information
- High school: Leo High School (Leo, Indiana)
- College: Iowa State (1981–1985)

Career highlights
- First-team All-Big Eight (1985)

Tonya Burns-Sheehan (née Burns, known as Tonya Burns-Cohrs from 1991 to the 2020s (Note: Burns married John Frederick Cohrs in 1991 and was known as Burns-Cohrs as late as 2020.)) is an American former basketball player and coach. After a noted high school career in Indiana, she starred for the Iowa State Cyclones from 1981 to 1985 and was the first women's basketball player at Iowa State to have her number retired. After an attempt to play professionally in the National Women's Basketball Association, which never played a regular-season game, she became a high school basketball coach and physical education teacher in her native Indiana.

== Playing career ==
Tonya Burns grew up shooting baskets with her father and brother at her childhood home in Cedarville, Indiana. She played softball, volleyball, and track, later recalling that Indiana—which in the 1970s was still phasing in women's sports at the high school level—offered little more than intramurals, which did not include basketball for girls.

At Leo High School, Burns averaged 17 points and 11 rebounds a game in her final two seasons as the first girl in school history to surpass 1,000 career points. In her senior season of 1980–81, the team was expected to contend for a state championship, but Burns sprained her ankle; she instead watched from the bench as Leo was upset before making the tournament in Indianapolis. She was named to the Indiana girls All-Star basketball team.

In March 1981, Burns signed a letter of intent to play for the Iowa State Cyclones. Iowa State's coach at the time, Deb Oing, hailed from Indiana. The switch from high school to college, with its taller players, led her to become less of a scorer and more of a rebounder in her first season. She set a new school rebounding record in her freshman year of 1981–82 with 213, averaging 11.3 points per game, and was selected to play at the National Sports Festival.

In her sophomore year of 1982–83, Burns set a new Iowa State season scoring record with 460. The team had a 5–6 beginning to its campaign. Burns paced the Cyclones in points and rebounds; in the lone win of the first five games, a double-overtime win over Oklahoma State, she posted a career-high 29 points.

Burns was Iowa State's lone representative to the all–Big Eight team in her junior season of 1983–84, earning second-team honors even as the Cyclones finished 4–23 and 0–14 in league play. She scored her 1,000th career point in a 42-point, 18-rebound performance on January 18, 1984, as Iowa State lost to Nebraska; later that month, she became the all-time leading rebounder in program history. During the offseason, she participated in tryouts for the U.S. Olympic basketball team, missing an early cut.

For the 1984–85 season, Pam Wettig replaced Oing as coach. On November 24, 1984, Burns surpassed Pat Hodgson to become the all-time leading point-scorer in ISU history. The team finished the regular season at 12–15 and 3–11 in Big Eight play. In spite of losing in the first round of the Big Eight conference tournament, the team posted its best season since 1977–78. After the season, Burns was named to the first team all–Big Eight and became the first Iowa State woman athlete to have her number retired, in possession of 31 school records. Her 1,789 points stood as the Iowa State high mark until she was surpassed by Jayme Olson on March 16, 1998; Olson became the second Cyclone women's basketball player to have her number retired in 2004. After graduation, Burns continued to pursue her education degree at Iowa State.

Burns signed to play for the Virginia Express of the National Women's Basketball Association (NWBA), a new professional league, in September 1986. The Express and several other NWBA teams held exhibitions, but the financially strapped league never played a single regular-season game. She later attempted to try out for the WNBA a decade later, but tryouts were scrapped due to a collective bargaining dispute.

Burns-Cohrs was inducted into the Iowa State Cyclones Hall of Fame in 2000 and the Indiana Basketball Hall of Fame in 2010.

== Coaching ==
Beginning in the mid-1980s, Burns became a high school basketball coach in northeast Indiana. She coached North Side High School in Fort Wayne for 13 years before spending another 13 at Woodlan Junior/Senior High School, compiling 219 wins in her 26 seasons. Burns-Cohrs left coaching after the 2012–13 season to focus on being a physical education teacher at Woodlan.
