= Wes Washpun =

American basketball player (born 1993)

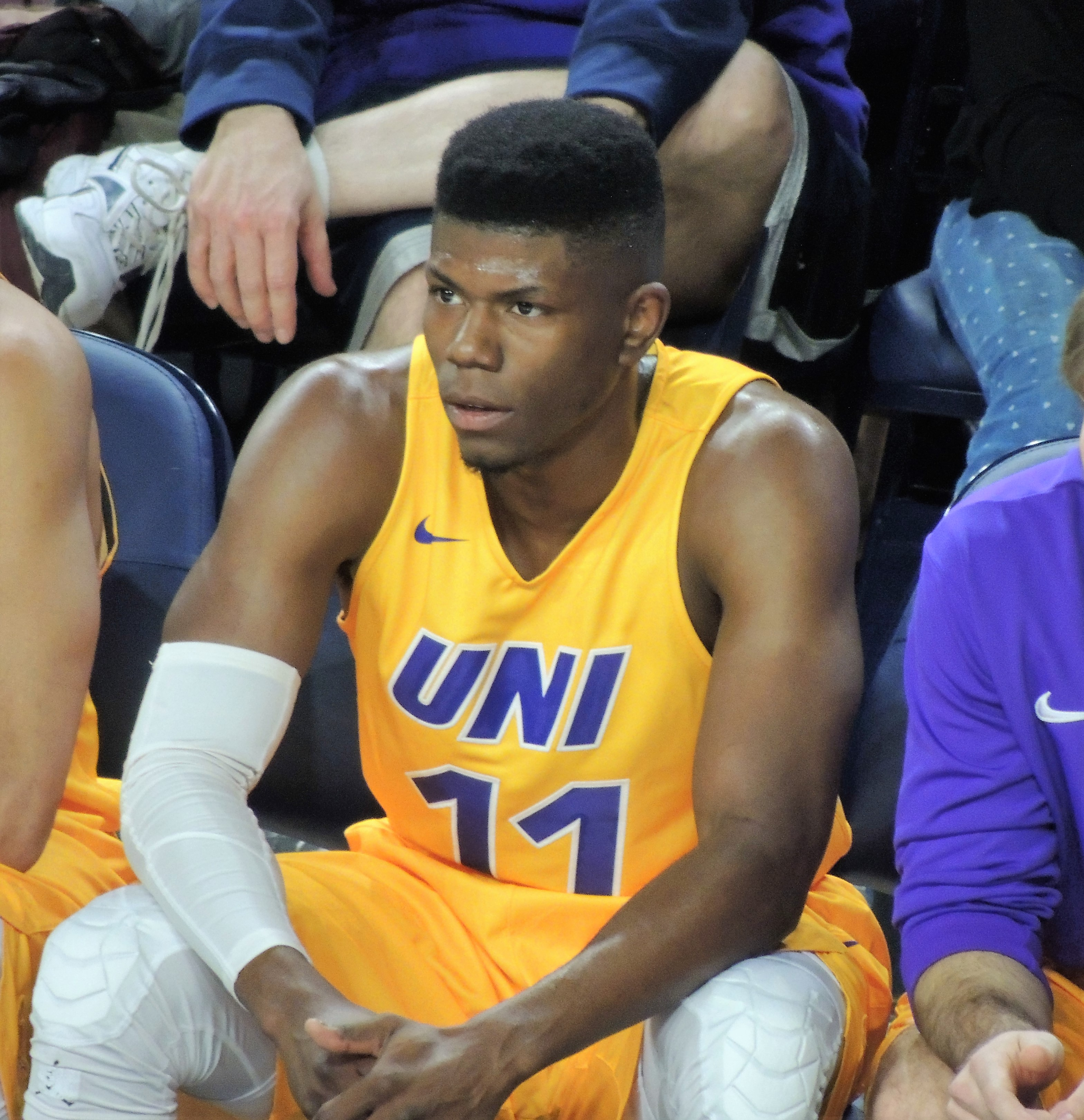
- Washpun at Northern Iowa

Rapid București
- Position: Point guard
- League: Liga Națională

Personal information
- Born: March 26, 1993 (age 33) Cedar Rapids, Iowa, U.S.
- Listed height: 6 ft 1 in (1.85 m)
- Listed weight: 175 lb (79 kg)

Career information
- High school: Washington (Cedar Rapids, Iowa)
- College: Tennessee (2011–2012); Northern Iowa (2013–2016)
- NBA draft: 2016: undrafted
- Playing career: 2016–present

Career history
- 2016: MHP Riesen Ludwigsburg
- 2016–2018: Iowa Energy/Wolves
- 2019–2021: Ventspils
- 2021: Larisa
- 2021–2022: Astoria Bydgoszcz
- 2022: Ostioneros de Guaymas
- 2023: Ylli
- 2023: Oliveirense Basquetebol
- 2024–2026: Porto
- 2026–present: Rapid București

Career highlights
- Portuguese League champion (2026); Portuguese Supercup winner (2024); Portuguese Cup winner (2025); Second-team All-MVC (2016); MVC Sixth Man of the Year (2015); MVC Newcomer of the Year (2014); MVC All-Newcomer Team (2014); MVC tournament MVP (2016)

Wesley Lamar Washpun (born March 26, 1993) is an American professional basketball player for Rapid București of the Liga Națională. He played college basketball for the Tennessee Volunteers and Northern Iowa Panthers.

== High school career ==
Washpun played for Washington High School in Cedar Rapids, Iowa under coach Brad Metzger. As a senior, he set a single-season steals school record with 92 and averaged 18 points, 5.4 rebounds, 4.0 assists, 3.7 steals and 2.1 blocks leading the Warriors to a 17–9 record and to the Class 4A tournament quarterfinals, where Washpun scored a team-high 23 points. This earned him first-team Class 4A All-State honors from the Iowa Newspaper Association.

== College career ==
After turning down a recruiting offer from Iowa, Washpun decided to attend the University of Tennessee where he averaged 0.9 points, 1.3 rebounds and 1.4 assists in 17 games. After his freshman season, he transferred to Northern Iowa. As a senior, he averaged 16.3 points on 51.4% shooting from the floor while leading the Panthers during a noteworthy NCAA Tournament run, upsetting No. 6 seed Texas before losing to Texas A&M in the second round.

After graduating, Washpun had the fourth most assists in school history and scored 1,035 points during his three-year career with the Panthers. He also set the school's all-time single assist record as a senior with 190 assists.

== Professional career ==
After going undrafted in the 2016 NBA draft, Washpun joined the Los Angeles Clippers for the 2016 NBA Summer League. On July 10, 2016, Washpun signed with MHP Riesen Ludwigsburg of the German Bundesliga. On December 5, he left the team after averaging 5.4 points, 2.8 rebounds and 3.2 assists in 15 games. On December 26, he was acquired by the Iowa Energy of the NBA Development League.

In the 2017–18 season, Washpun averaged 6.6 points, 2.1 rebounds, and 2.0 assists per game in 43 games with Iowa.

On August 7, 2019, he has signed with BK Ventspils.

On January 30, 2021, Washpun signed with Greek club Larisa.

On October 18, 2021, he has signed with Astoria Bydgoszcz of the PLK.

== Personal life ==
The son of Troy and Angie Washpun and brother of D'Angelo he majored in family services. His father played college basketball at the University of Wyoming.
