= Hannah Stuelke =

American basketball player

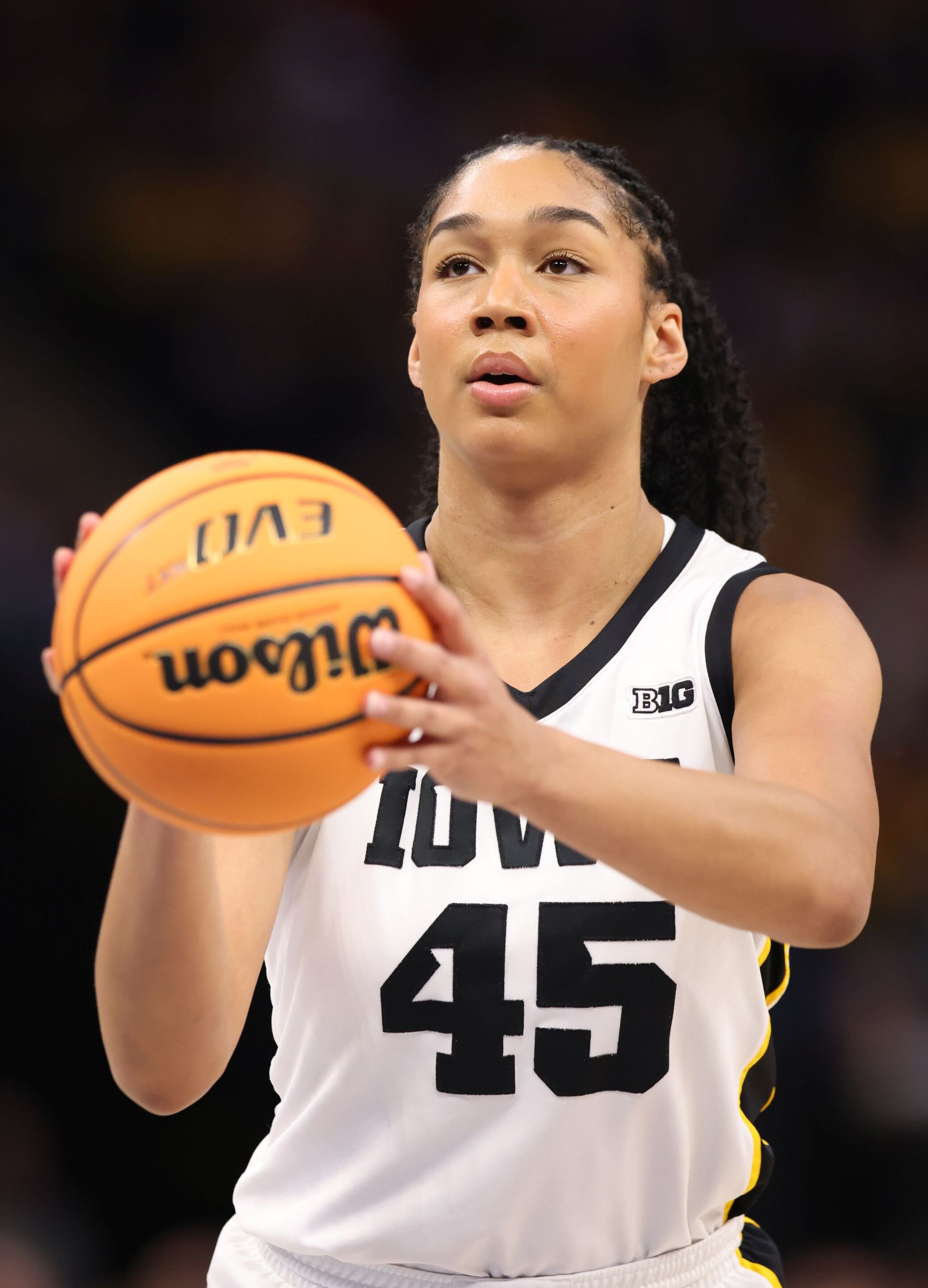
- Stuelke with Iowa in 2024

No. 45 – Logiman Broni
- Position: Forward
- League: Italian Serie A1 women's basketball league

Personal information
- Born: July 10, 2003 (age 23) Cedar Rapids, Iowa, U.S.
- Listed height: 6 ft 2 in (1.88 m)

Career information
- High school: Washington (Cedar Rapids, Iowa)
- College: Iowa (2022–2026)
- WNBA draft: 2026: undrafted

Career highlights
- 2× Second-team All-Big Ten (2024, 2026); Big Ten Sixth Player of the Year (2023); Iowa Miss Basketball (2022)
Medals
Women's basketball
Representing the United States
FIBA AmeriCup
Gold medal – first place	2025 Chile

Hannah Stuelke (born July 10, 2003) is an American basketball player for the Serie A1 side Broni Italian team and most recently played for the Iowa Hawkeyes of the Big Ten Conference.

== Early life and high school career ==
Stuelke began playing basketball at a young age. She played high school basketball for Washington High School in Cedar Rapids, Iowa, where she set the school record for career points, and was named first-team all-state three times. She led the team in scoring as a freshman and committed to Iowa that spring. She averaged a double-double in points and rebounds over her high school career. She was named Iowa Miss Basketball in 2022 after leading the state with 29.1 points per game. She also lettered in high school volleyball and track and field. She played for Nike Girls EYBL (NIKE) team All Iowa Attack.

== College career ==
Stuelke was named the Big Ten Sixth Player of the Year in her freshman season at Iowa in 2022–23, coming in for forwards Monika Czinano and McKenna Warnock. As a sophomore, she scored a career-high 47 points against Penn State on February 8, 2024. She scored 25 points in the 2024 Big Ten championship game. In the 2024 NCAA Division I Women's Basketball Tournament she was named to the Final Four All-Tournament Team.

== Career statistics ==
Legend
GP	Games played	GS	Games started	MPG	Minutes per game	RPG	Rebounds per game
APG	Assists per game	SPG	Steals per game	BPG	Blocks per game	PPG	Points per game
TO	Turnovers per game	FG%	Field-goal percentage	3P%	3-point field-goal percentage	FT%	Free-throw percentage
**Bold**	Career best	°	League leader

=== College ===
Year	Team	GP	GS	MPG	FG%	3P%	FT%	RPG	APG	SPG	BPG	TO	PPG
2022–23	Iowa	**37**	0	13.0	61.0	16.7	46.0	3.9	0.6	0.5	0.1	1.1	6.5
2023–24	Iowa	35	**32**	24.5	**62.7**	**50.0**	62.9	6.6	1.2	0.7	**0.5**	1.7	**14.0**
2024–25	Iowa	32	32	27.5	49.8	11.8	**67.5**	7.7	2.2	0.9	0.4	**2.3**	12.7
2025–26	Iowa	32	32	**30.5**	53.6	22.2	55.4	**9.0**	**2.9**	**1.3**	0.4	2.0	13.4
**Career**		136	96	23.5	56.3	22.5	59.5	6.7	1.7	0.8	0.4	1.7	11.5
Statistics retrieved from Sports-Reference.
