= Washington High School (Cedar Rapids, Iowa) =

Public secondary school in Cedar Rapids, Iowa, United States

George Washington High School

Location
- 2205 Forest Drive Southeast; Cedar Rapids, Iowa 52403; United States; 41°59′48″N 91°37′52″W

Information
- Type: Public secondary
- Established: 1956
- School district: Cedar Rapids Community School District
- Principal: Ian LeMaster
- Staff: 76.61 (FTE)
- Grades: 9–12
- Enrollment: 1,233 (2023–2024)
- Student to teacher ratio: 16.09
- Colors: Red and Blue
- Mascot: Warrior (official name: Wally Warrior)
- Newspaper: The Surveyor
- Yearbook: The Monument
- Affiliation: Mississippi Valley Conference
- Website: washington.crschools.us

Washington High School (officially George Washington High School) is a public high school in Cedar Rapids, in the U.S. state of Iowa. Built in 1956, it is named in honor of the oldest high school in Cedar Rapids.

== History ==
Built in 1855, the original Washington High School—not yet known by that name—opened in 1857. In 1869, it narrowed from a general school to a high school. Originally called "the schoolhouse," the "Cedar Rapids graded school," and the "second ward school", it received its current name in 1875 when all the Cedar Rapids schools were named for presidents. The oldest building was called Washington School. In 1887, Abbie S. Abbott began her 34-year tenure as Washington High School principal. The school was expanded in 1910 to help deal with overcrowding, but the expanded room from the addition did not suffice for long. The nearby vocational school Grant School was converted to a regular high school to reduce the burden. Deteriorating conditions at the original structure led to its abandonment in 1935. Four junior high schools in the area, which had been expanded in preparation, were converted to joint junior and senior high schools.

September 3, 1957, was the first day of school at new Washington. Washington began with grades 10-12 and became a four-year high school in 1987.

During the 1956–57 school year, students voted on colors for the new school and selected red and blue with white trim. They also picked the “Warrior” as Washington's mascot.

In 1961, 17,625 square feet (1,637.4 m^{2}) of classroom space were added to the south end of the building—12 classrooms. In 1971, the area under the library was enclosed to provide new office space for the counselors. In 1990, a new gymnasium was built to accommodate the increasing number of recognition assemblies.

In 2003, a large wing of six classrooms and six science laboratories was added to the southwest corner of the building. At the same time, a new band room was completed and the entire original music area was remodeled to house the growing vocal and string orchestra programs.

The first principal, Fred J. Kluss, had been principal at Roosevelt before coming to Washington in 1957. Kluss was succeeded as principal by Don Birdsell, who served for three years. Robert O. Fitzsimmons became principal in 1962. Donald G. Nau took over as principal in the middle of the 1966–67 school year. Ralph Plagman was principal from 1981 to 2016. Ralph Plagman resigned in 2016, with Dr. Carlos Grant taking up the job as interim. John Cline was hired as principal on April 19, 2017. After the 2020 school year, John Cline resigned from the job and moved back to North Carolina. The international pandemic and his deep marital issues were cited as the reasons for his resignation.

In the spring semester of 2017, transgender student Jeffrey Abraham was elected as President of the class of 2020. Abraham is cited as the first transgender president in the state of Iowa. Under his class presidency, thousands of dollars were raised for the school. His three years as president, culminated in an inspiring speech he gave for the graduating class on may 29, 2020. The commencement speech was recorded and broadcast live on Youtube, due to the in-person commencement ceremony being canceled in the wake of the Covid-19 pandemic.

In December 2017, a former substitute teacher at the school, Mary Elizabeth Haglin, was convicted of sexual exploitation by a school employee, an aggravated misdemeanor. She had a sexual relationship with 17-year-old student from 2015 to June 2016. An appeal, on May 2, 2018, upheld the ruling of 90 days jail sentence, the appeal delaying the start of her sentence until October 2018.

== Art gallery ==
In 2007 Washington High School opened an art gallery to feature the works of famous Washington alumni. The gallery includes works by Grant Wood and Marvin Cone, who both graduated in 1910 at the "old Washington" school. The gallery's centerpiece is Kanesville, a mural Wood painted in 1927.

== Extracurricular activities ==
=== Athletics ===
The Warriors compete in the Mississippi Valley Conference in the following sports:

- Cross Country
- Volleyball
- Football
  - 2 State Runner-Ups (2003, 2014)
  - 9 District Championships (1973, 1974, 1976, 1994, 2002, 2003, 2007, 2014, 2015)
  - 29 Playoff Appearances (1973, 1974, 1976, 1978, 1979, 1980, 1981, 1982, 1984, 1985, 1987, 1993, 1994, 1999, 2002, 2003, 2005, 2007, 2008, 2009, 2010, 2011, 2013, 2014, 2015, 2016, 2017, 2021, 2022)
- Basketball
  - 3-time Boys' State Champions (pre-IHSAA: 1914, 1916, 1922)
- Wrestling
  - 1921 State Champions (pre-IHSAA)
  - 1970 Class 3A State Champions
- Swimming
- Track and Field
- Soccer
- Softball
- Baseball
- Tennis
  - 5-time Boys' Class 2A State Champions (1983, 1987, 1990, 1994, 1996)
- Bowling

== Notable alumni ==
- Katie Abrahamson-Henderson - women's basketball head coach, University of Georgia
- Landen Akers - UFL wide receiver, San Antonio Brahmas
- Adrian Arrington - NFL wide receiver
- Alanna Arrington - fashion model
- Frank Baker - NFL wide receiver
- Rob Bruggeman - NFL center
- Arthur A. Collins - inventor
- Ross Colton - American professional ice hockey center, Colorado Avalanche
- Marvin Cone - painter and art professor
- Keenan Davis - American football player
- Don DeFore - actor
- Sidney Dietch - pianist and voice teacher
- Paul Engle - poet
- Brenda Frese - women's basketball head coach, University of Maryland
- Izaah Knox Iowa State Senator
- Erik Koch MMA fighter
- John Lipsky, economist
- Bob Netolicky - professional basketball player; member ABA All-Time Team
- George Nissen - developer of modern trampoline
- Tyler Olson - Iowa State Representative from 65th District
- AJ Puk - MLB pitcher
- Beardsley Ruml - academic
- Sami Scheetz - Iowa state representative from District 78
- William L. Shirer - author
- Henry C. Spencer - businessman
- Hannah Stuelke - NCAA college basketball player, Iowa Hawkeyes
- Carl Van Vechten - writer
- Dedric Ward - coach and wide receiver in NFL
- Wes Washpun - professional basketball player
- Grant Wood - painter
