= National Women's Basketball Association =

1986 basketball league in the United States

The National Women's Basketball Association (NWBA) was an American women's basketball league that intended to play its first full regular season in 1986–87. Headquartered in Lake Wylie, South Carolina—a suburb of Charlotte, North Carolina—and owned by Howard Hanson, the league planned to start with eight teams, primarily in the Southeastern United States. It struggled to sign marquee players because of concerns about its amateur status and consequent effects on Olympic eligibility, and ticket sales were slow. While several exhibitions were held, a key financial backer failed to fulfill his commitment, and no regular-season games were played. The league, indebted, formally canceled the season by the end of 1986.

== Announcement ==
The formation of the league was unveiled in April 1986. Its owner, Howard Hanson, declared that the league would avoid the financial pitfalls that doomed two prior attempts—the Women's American Basketball Association and Women's Basketball League—by controlling costs. The eight teams would be centrally owned by the league for several years, and the teams would pay salaries of $10,000 to $18,000 to their twelve players. Games would be played on weekends only in a regular season extending from November through May. There would be an all-star game in January and playoffs in May, with all eight teams qualifying.

In early June, the league held a territorial draft, assigning players to teams based on their college locations in a process similar to that used by the United States Football League. The concept was to draw fans based on players who had played college basketball in the same general area. Cheryl Miller was selected first overall, but Miller—who became aware of the NWBA only by reading newspaper reports—refused to play in the new league because she could make more from commercial endorsement deals than the $18,000 maximum salary. With no coaches formally hired, the draft was conducted by the league office. Kim Boatman of The Knoxville News-Sentinel criticized the draft as evincing unfamiliarity with women's college basketball, noting that many talented players were ignored and that the Southeastern Conference was underrepresented. Later that month, the league held tryouts in Charlotte; Orange County, California; Hartford, Connecticut; and Tulsa, Oklahoma, to search for players.

Several teams moved or changed names in the planning stages. The Cincinnati Tiger-Cats had been relocated to Knoxville, Tennessee, as the Tennessee Tigercats by late May. By that same time period, the Virginia Mermaids, to play in Richmond, had been renamed the Express. Some cities, though small, were chosen for their support of women's college basketball. For instance, Monroe, Louisiana, had good support for the women's teams at Northeast Louisiana University, and Louisiana Tech University was 30 minutes away.

The most drastic move came from the Iowa franchise—announced as the Iowa Aces, to play in Cedar Rapids, at the 7,500-seat Five Seasons Center. That news came as a surprise to management of the Five Seasons Center, which had not heard from the team. The center's commissioners worried that the Aces would face poor ticket sales in light of competition from Iowa Hawkeyes women's basketball in nearby Iowa City and high school sports; its manager pointed out that the arena was booked for key February and March dates by such events as the Home Show and Country Art Fair. By mid-June, the league was analyzing moving the team out of Cedar Rapids, though Bruce Mason—a former assistant coach at Drake University who had been involved with the WBL's Iowa Coronets—doubted that arrangements could be made there.

In August, the league announced at a press conference that Wanda Ford, a star at Drake, was considering signing with the Iowa team, which had been renamed the Pride of Iowa and moved to Des Moines. However, Ford was still concerned about losing her amateur status—and thus her eligibility to compete in the 1988 Summer Olympics—were she to sign with the league. Other big names, like Kamie Ethridge and Fran Harris, opted to wait for the league to obtain this status. An October 3 deadline for an announcement on the matter came and went. Ultimately, Ford chose to play in Italy, preserving her amateur status and Olympic eligibility. Cindy Brogdon, the anticipated star player for the Georgia Peaches, opted out two weeks before the season was to start.

== Financial issues and cancellation ==
Financial concerns continued to hang over the new league. In July, Leonard Laye of The Charlotte Observer wrote a feature story that included troubling signs for the venture. No contracts had been signed for any of the venues. Deadlines to hire coaches had come and gone, and announced hirings of Richard Keast in Georgia and Charlotte Mason in Texas failed to materialize; additionally, the league was late to sign any players. For others, such as Pat Summitt, the poor track record of startup women's basketball leagues was enough to cause concern. Acting commissioner Wayne Fulcher claimed that the league had enough investor backing to run a season without gate receipts or television contract money, but the league was reticent to discuss its finances.

Season ticket sales started very slowly. By early September, the league had sold just 50 season tickets, each worth $200, across its markets. The league's offering struggled to coexist with more popular, and often cheaper, college season ticket packages in the same markets. For instance, in Knoxville, the University of Tennessee Lady Volunteers sold season tickets for $50, but even after cutting prices, a full season of Tigercats basketball cost $150. To cut expenses, the league office moved to smaller quarters in Pineville, North Carolina, another Charlotte suburb. Fulcher stated that, for the Virginia Express to break even, the team would need to attract 1,000 fans. Another way the league hoped to raise money was by selling a "founder's package", consisting of a T-shirt, medallion, and certificate. The league contacted college programs and asked them to buy the packages so players could resell them. Bernadette McGlade, the head women's basketball coach at Georgia Tech, derided the concept as "like something from grammar school, making money for a class trip"; Howard Hanson later said it was a mistake not to seek corporate support first.

As the season approached, some teams were in much better shape than others, and several teams began playing exhibitions. On October 19, the league held a jamboree exhibition event in Charlotte, which was intended to feature all eight teams. Only four teams played: Carolina, Georgia, Tennessee, and Virginia. The Pride of Iowa also made the trip but not to play; the franchise still needed players to fill out its roster, with only six signed players as of October 3. Its office telephone had been disconnected, and the Veterans Memorial Auditorium—which demanded money up front because the defunct Coronets still owed the arena—began booking other events on dates scheduled for the team's home games. California, Louisiana, and Texas did not make the trip, per commissioner Fulcher, "to work on promotions in their area"; the primary reason Texas failed to show was that the team had no point guard on its roster. The event, which the league hoped would attract as many as 1,000, was reported by the league to have an attendance between 300 and 400; Stan Olson of The Observer cited a headcount of 188. The league sent a bus to Knoxville to pick up the Tigercats; by the time it got there, it was running on empty, forcing coach Gina DiCicco to pay for gas.

Michael Kramer, a California investor contacted in August, failed to fulfill his $2.6 million investment commitment in the NWBA. As a result, at an October 25 meeting in Atlanta, the league postponed the start of the season from November 1 to December 5; Kramer stated he was trying to raise the money, while teams were not informed of his withdrawal for 30 days, preventing them from securing other funding sources. Unpaid bills were piling up, including hotels, telephone service, and liability insurance through Mutual of Omaha. With the postponement, Dave Wolter, head coach of the California Stars, told The Observer that the team had ceased practicing and he had resigned, with his lone paycheck bouncing; Gina DiCicco announced that all local operations of the Tennessee Tigercats had folded, and half of her ten-player squad had departed. Texas Twisters coach Gary Orr's lone paycheck also bounced, as did several player paychecks. Orr was $10,000 in debt after running the Twisters for two months. On November 21, the postponement became indefinite; the league abandoned its headquarters, and the telephones there were disconnected.

The Carolina Blaze were the last team to stay together, through the end of 1986, but coach Angie Rinehart folded the team after no movement toward starting the season took place. The league formally canceled its operations at the end of January 1987, some $150,000 in debt. Molly Bolin, hired as an assistant commissioner, recalled the league never reimbursed her for travel to the Iowa press conference. Fulcher, the acting commissioner, reported that he was still under contract but not being paid.

== Teams ==
The NWBA intended to field eight teams:

NWBA teams
| Name | City | State | Venue | Capacity | Coach |
|---|---|---|---|---|---|
| California Stars | Orange County | California | California State University, Dominguez Hills (Note: The manager of rentals for the gym at CSU–Dominguez Hills told The Knoxville News-Sentinel it would not be possible to rent the gym to the Stars out of deference to the needs of their own program.) | 4,000 | Dave Wolter |
| Carolina Blaze | Charlotte | North Carolina | Park Center | 3,000 | Angie Rinehart |
| Georgia Peaches | Atlanta | Georgia | Morris Brown College | 10,000 | Bill Muse |
| Louisiana Blues | Monroe | Louisiana | Monroe Civic Center | 10,000 | Anthony Witherspoon |
| Pride of Iowa | Des Moines | Iowa | Veterans Memorial Auditorium | 15,000 | Lee Swayze |
| Tennessee Tigercats | Knoxville | Tennessee | Civic Coliseum | 6,500 | Gina DiCicco |
| Texas Twisters | Austin | Texas | Givens Recreation Center (Note: In late September, the team was in negotiations with the Austin Independent School District to play in the 3,500-seat Burger Center, and the district was likely to grant the request.) | 2,000 | Gary Orr |
| Virginia Express | Richmond | Virginia | Arthur Ashe Athletic Center | 6,000 | Bertha Cummings |

A ninth team was cited as a possibility for Columbia, South Carolina, if enough season tickets were sold there.
