= Bill Fennelly =

American basketball coach

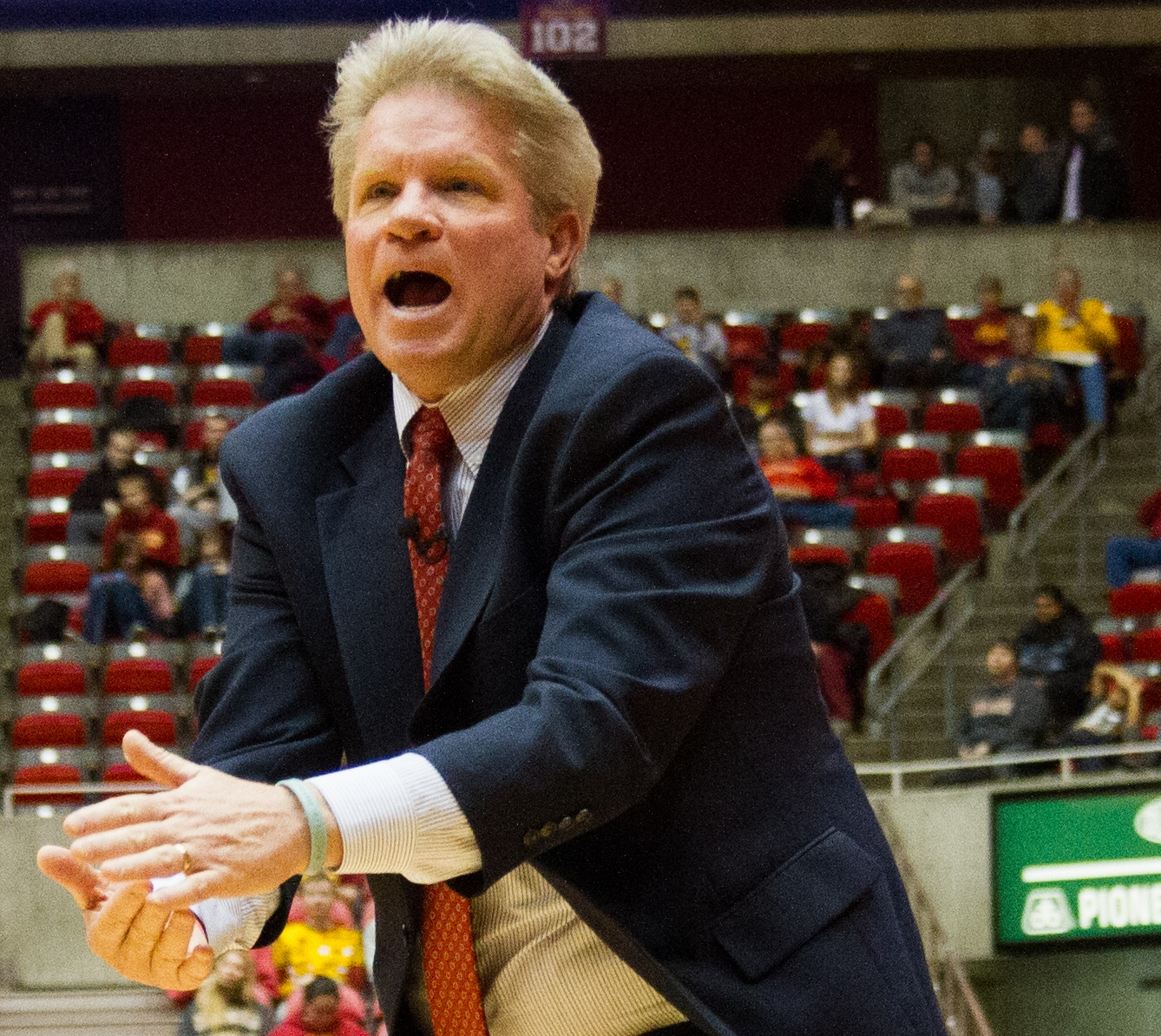
- Fennelly in 2016

Current position
- Title: Head coach
- Team: Iowa State
- Conference: Big 12
- Record: 656–334 (.663)

Biographical details
- Born: May 14, 1957 (age 69); Davenport, Iowa, U.S.
- Education: William Penn College ('79)

Coaching career (HC unless noted)
- 1977–1981: William Penn (asst.)
- 1981–1986: Fresno State (asst.)
- 1986–1988: Notre Dame (asst.)
- 1988–1995: Toledo
- 1995–present: Iowa State

Head coaching record
- Overall: 822–386 (.680)
- Tournaments: 25–27 (NCAA); 10–5 (NWIT/WNIT)

Accomplishments and honors

Championships
- 3× MAC regular season (1991, 1992, 1995); 3× MAC tournament (1991, 1992, 1995); Big 12 regular season (2000); 3× Big 12 Tournament (2000, 2001, 2023)

Awards
- 2× WBCA District 5 Coach of the Year (1999, 2005)
Medal record
Coach for Women's Basketball
United States (head coach)
World University Games
Gold medal – first place	2011 Shenzhen	Team
United States (assistant coach)
FIBA Under-19 World Championship
Gold medal – first place	2009 Bangkok	Team
FIBA Americas Under-18 Championship
Gold medal – first place	2008 Buenos Aires	Team

William Michael Fennelly (born May 14, 1957) is an American college basketball coach who is currently the head women's basketball coach at Iowa State University.

== Coaching career ==
=== William Penn College ===
While a student at William Penn College, Fennelly became a volunteer assistant coach with the William Penn women's basketball team in 1977. After graduating with a bachelor's degree in business administration and economics in 1979, Fennelly became a full-time assistant coach with William Penn.

=== Fresno State and Notre Dame (1981-1986) ===
Fennelly moved up to the Division I level as an assistant coach at Fresno State from 1981 to 1986 and Notre Dame from 1986 to 1988.

=== Toledo (1988–1995) ===
At the University of Toledo, Fennelly was head coach from 1988 to 1995 and had a cumulative record of 166–53, with a .758 winning percentage that remains the best in the Mid-American Conference. He had six seasons with 20 or more wins and six postseason tournament berths. Toledo made the National Women's Invitational Tournament in 1989, 1990, and 1994 and were NWIT runners-up in 1990, and the NCAA tournament in 1991, 1992, and 1995.

=== Iowa State (1995–present) ===
On July 10, 1995, Iowa State hired Fennelly as women's basketball head coach. Iowa State had only five winning seasons in the 22 previous seasons. As of the 2016–17 season, Fennelly has led Iowa State to 17 appearances in the NCAA Tournament, including Elite Eight qualifications in 1999 and 2009 and the Sweet Sixteen in 2000, 2001, and 2010. Iowa State has spent considerable time in the Associated Press national poll, including 34 weeks in the Top 10. On March 23, 2007, Iowa State extended Fennelly through 2019 in a contract worth $10.6 million.

Attendance grew during Fennelly's tenure from the hundreds prior to his hiring to nearly 10,000 in the 2010s. In 2004, Iowa State had its first-ever sellout in a WNIT and NIT doubleheader against Saint Joseph's. In the 2011–12 season, Iowa State averaged an attendance of 10,125, third in the nation behind Tennessee and Louisville.

Fennelly was a finalist for the Naismith Coach of the Year Award in 2001, 2002, and 2005. The Women's Basketball Coaches Association named him the District 5 Coach of the Year in 1999 and 2005. In 1998, Fennelly finished as the 1998 runner-up behind Pat Summitt of Tennessee for the Associated Press Women's Coach of the Year award.

== USA Basketball ==
Fennelly served as an assistant coach of the U18 team representing the US at the 2008 FIBA Americas U18 Championship for Women in Buenos Aires, Argentina. The USA team won all five of their games, including the championship game against the host team, Argentina. The team won the final game 81–37 to claim the gold medal.

Fennelly continued his position as an assistant coach as the U18 team became the U19 team, and competed in the FIBA Women's U19 World Championship. The USA lost the opening round game against Spain 90–86, but then went on to win their next eight games. In the quarterfinals, the USA team faced France, which held an eight-point lead late in the second half, but the USA team took back the lead and won by eleven to advance to the semifinals. After beating Canada in the semifinals, they had a rematch against Spain, for the championship. This time the USA jumped out to an early lead, with a score of 33–16 at the end of the first quarter. The USA went on to win 87–71 to win the gold medal.

Fennelly was named the head coach of the USA representative to the 2011 World University Games (also known as the FISU World University Games) which were held in Shenzhen, China. The USA team won all six games, behind the scoring leadership of Elena Delle Donne who scored almost 16 points per game. Although the championship game was against Taiwan, the closest contest was the semifinal game against Australia. That game remained close until the fourth quarter, when a 9–0 run extended the margin and helped secure the 79–67 victory.

== Personal ==
Fennelly was born and raised in Davenport, Iowa. He and his wife, Deb, have two sons, Billy and Steven, both of whom worked for their father's coaching staff at Iowa State. Billy was director of player development from 2010 to 2012 before becoming an assistant coach at Iowa State. Steven was a graduate assistant at Iowa State from 2011 to 2013.

== Head coaching record ==
Source for Toledo:

Sources for Iowa State:

Record table
Season	Team	Overall	Conference	Standing	Postseason
Toledo Rockets (Mid-American Conference) (1988–1995)
1988–89	Toledo	25–8	13–3	2nd	NWIT Third Place
1989–90	Toledo	25–7	13–3	2nd	NWIT Runners-Up
1990–91	Toledo	24–7	13–3	1st	NCAA Second Round
1991–92	Toledo	26–6	15–1	1st	NCAA Second Round
1992–93	Toledo	18–10	12–6	T–3rd	
1993–94	Toledo	24–8	13–5	T–2nd	NWIT Fifth Place
1994–95	Toledo	24–7	15–3	T–1st	NCAA First Round
Toledo:		166–53 (.758)	94–24 (.797)		
Iowa State Cyclones (Big Eight Conference) (1995–1996)
1995–96	Iowa State	17–10	5–9	T–6th	
Iowa State Cyclones (Big 12 Conference) (1996–present)
1996–97	Iowa State	17–12	9–7	T–5th	NCAA First Round
1997–98	Iowa State	25–8	12–4	2nd	NCAA Second Round
1998–99	Iowa State	25–8	12–4	2nd	NCAA Elite Eight
1999–00	Iowa State	27–6	13–3	T–1st	NCAA Sweet Sixteen
2000–01	Iowa State	27–6	12–4	3rd	NCAA Sweet Sixteen
2001–02	Iowa State	24–9	9–7	6th	NCAA Second Round
2002–03	Iowa State	12–16	7–9	8th	
2003–04	Iowa State	18–15	7–9	T–8th	WNIT Semifinal
2004–05	Iowa State	23–7	12–4	T–3rd	NCAA First Round
2005–06	Iowa State	18–13	7–9	T–8th	WNIT Second Round
2006–07	Iowa State	26–9	10–6	T–4th	NCAA Second Round
2007–08	Iowa State	21–13	7–9	T–7th	NCAA Second Round
2008–09	Iowa State	27–9	11–5	T–3rd	NCAA Elite Eight
2009–10	Iowa State	25–8	11–5	T–2nd	NCAA Sweet Sixteen
2010–11	Iowa State	22–11	9–7	5th	NCAA First Round
2011–12	Iowa State	18–13	9–9	T–4th	NCAA First Round
2012–13	Iowa State	24–9	12–6	2nd	NCAA Second Round
2013–14	Iowa State	20–11	9–9	T–5th	NCAA First Round
2014–15	Iowa State	18–13	9–9	T–3rd	NCAA First Round
2015–16	Iowa State	13–17	5–13	8th	
2016–17	Iowa State	18–13	9–9	5th	NCAA First Round
2017–18	Iowa State	14–17	7–11	T–7th	
2018–19	Iowa State	26–9	13–5	2nd	NCAA Second Round
2019–20	Iowa State	18–11	10–8	T–4th	Cancelled due to COVID-19
2020–21	Iowa State	17–11	12–6	4th	NCAA Second Round
2021–22	Iowa State	28–7	14–4	2nd	NCAA Sweet Sixteen
2022–23	Iowa State	22–10	11–7	3rd	NCAA First Round
2023–24	Iowa State	21–12	12–6	T-4th	NCAA Second Round
2024–25	Iowa State	23–12	12–6	7th	NCAA First Round
2025–26	Iowa State	22–10	10–8	T–7th	NCAA First Round
2026–27	Iowa State	6–0	0–0		
Iowa State:		662–334 (.665)	307–217 (.586)		
Total:		828–387 (.681)			
National champion Postseason invitational champion Conference regular season champion Conference regular season and conference tournament champion Division regular season champion Division regular season and conference tournament champion Conference tournament champion

== See also ==
- List of college women's basketball career coaching wins leaders
