= Iowa State Cyclones women's basketball =

Women's basketball team of Iowa State University

2026–27 Iowa State Cyclones women's basketball team
- University: Iowa State University
- Head coach: Bill Fennelly (32nd season)
- Location: Ames, Iowa
- Arena: Hilton Coliseum (capacity: 14,356)
- Conference: Big 12
- Nickname: Lady Cyclones
- Colors: Cardinal and gold

NCAA Division I tournament Elite Eight
- 1999, 2009
Other NCAA Division I tournament results
Sweet Sixteen	1999, 2000, 2001, 2009, 2010, 2022
Appearances	1997, 1998, 1999, 2000, 2001, 2002, 2005, 2007, 2008, 2009, 2010, 2011, 2012, 2013, 2014, 2015, 2017, 2019, 2021, 2022, 2023, 2024, 2025, 2026

Conference tournament champions
- 2000, 2001, 2023

Conference regular-season champions
- 2000

Uniforms
Home	Away

The Iowa State Cyclones women's basketball team is representing Iowa State University (ISU) and they currently compete in the Big 12 Conference of NCAA Division I. The team is coached by Bill Fennelly, who is in his 32nd year at Iowa State. The Cyclones play their home games at Hilton Coliseum on Iowa State's campus.

== Overview ==
Iowa State University is a national power in women's basketball. Since the expansion of the Big 12 in 1996, ISU has had only three losing seasons, has won four conference titles (1 regular season, 3 tournament), and has the best conference tournament record in the Big 12. Iowa State has made it to and won the Big 12 tournament championship game more times than any team except Oklahoma. Bill Fennelly is the coach of the women's team and largely responsible for building the program. In games played since the Big 12 was founded in 1996, ISU has a winning record against every Big 12 school except Baylor.

On a national level, since 1996 the Cyclones have made the NCAA tournament twenty one times, advancing six times to the Sweet Sixteen, including twice to the Elite Eight. Additionally, Iowa State has made the WNIT twice in that span. ISU was in the AP Top 25 poll for over four years and was in the Top 10 for 34 consecutive weeks starting in the 1999 season. ISU has been ranked in the top 10 for attendance every season since 1999–2000, including a #3 ranking for the 2008–2009 season which led all Big 12 schools and #2 nationally for the 2012–2013 season.

== History ==
=== Gloria Crosby (1973–1974) ===
In 1973, Coach Gloria Crosby led the Iowa State Women's Basketball team through their first season as a Division I program. Prior to that, women were only able to play intramural basketball. The team, at that point known as the "Cagers", played their first game on January 12, 1974, losing to Northern Iowa by 73–38. Crosby and the Iowa State Women's Basketball team got their first win a week later over Wartburg, 51–38. Gloria Crosby coached just one season and finished her basketball coach career at ISU with an 8–8 record. She would become the head coach of the Iowa State Softball team.

=== Lynn Wheeler (1974–1980) ===
Lynn Wheeler took over as head coach for ISU's second season of women's basketball (1974). Wheeler coached for six seasons and had winning records in three of those seasons. In Wheeler's second season, she led Iowa State to its first 20 win season. Lynn Wheeler resigned after finishing with 14 straight defeats, stating "I've taken this team as far as I can."

=== Deb Oing (1980–1984) ===
In 1981, Deb Oing became Iowa State’s third coach. Over four seasons she coached ISU to a 31–80 record and was coach in 1984 for ISU's only winless conference season (0–14). She coached Iowa State to the program’s first official Big Eight conference win, an 80–76 decision over Oklahoma in Ames on November 27, 1982. In 1982, Oing served with Team USA as an assistant.

=== Pam Wettig (1984–1992) ===
Pam Wettig became Iowa State's fourth head coach in 1985. Wettig coached for eight years and finished a 100–121 record. Wettig coached Iowa State to their first win in the Big Eight Conference tournament in 1990 (the Big Eight switched to a single-elimination event in 1983). Wettig was named Big Eight Coach of the Year for the 1985–1986 season.

=== Theresa Becker (1992–1995) ===
Theresa Becker became Iowa State’s fifth coach (1993–1995), finishing a disappointing 18–63 over three seasons. Iowa State never finished better than a tie for 7th place in the Big Eight under Becker.

=== Bill Fennelly (1995–Present) ===
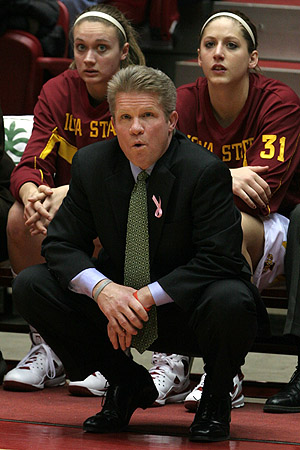

In 1995 (one year before inception of the Big 12), Iowa State hired former University of Toledo head women's basketball coach, Bill Fennelly. When Fennelly arrived, Iowa State hadn't had a winning season in seven years and only five winning seasons ever. In his first season, Fennelly led the Cyclones to a 17–10 record. That is nearly as many wins as Fennelly's predecessor, Theresa Becker, had in her career (18) at ISU in the three previous years.

Fennelly came to Iowa State after building a successful program at Toledo (.758 overall winning percentage, three NCAA and three WNIT appearances). In nineteen seasons at Iowa State (1995–2014), Fennelly has continued that success, compiling a record of 410–184 overall and 177–118 in conference play.

Under Fennelly, Iowa State advanced to its first NCAA appearance (1997), won its first NCAA game (1998), and hosted five consecutive NCAA first and second-round games (1998–2002) when host sites were earned, not pre-determined. Fennelly was national runner-up for the Associated Press (AP) Coach of the Year and guided the Cyclones to their first national ranking, reaching #22 (both in 1998). Iowa State advanced to the Elite 8 in 1999 and again in 2009. The Cyclones have made it to the Sweet 16 six times (1999–2001, 2009, 2010, 2022). Stacy Frese became Iowa State’s first AP All-American (1999). Iowa State won the Big 12 regular season title (2000) and three Big 12 Conference tournament championships (2000–2001, 2023). Iowa State defeated its first #1 ranked team (Texas Tech, ESPN poll) and advanced to its first post-season Final Four in the WNIT (both 2004).

== Championships ==
Titles	Type	Year
Conference championships
3	Big 12 Conference tournament Championships	2000, 2001, 2023
1	Big 12 Conference regular season Title	2000
3 Total

=== Conference Tournament seeds ===
In their history of appearances in the Big Eight/Twelve Conference tournaments, they have been seeded in the top five spots 16 times, with the most common seed being 8th, which they have been placed eight times.

==== Big Eight Conference ====
Years →	1983	1984	1985	1986	1987	1988	1989	1990	1991	1992	1993	1994	1995	1996
Seeds→	7	7	7	4	8	7	5	6	6	8	8	8	8	6

==== Big 12 Conference ====
Years →	1997	1998	1999	2000	2001	2002	2003	2004	2005	2006	2007	2008	2009	2010	2011
Seeds→	6	2	2	1	3	6	8	9	5	9	5	8	3	2	5

2012	2013	2014	2015	2016	2017	2018	2019	2020	2021	2022	2023
4	2	5	5	8	5	7	2	4	4	2	3

== NCAA Tournament history ==
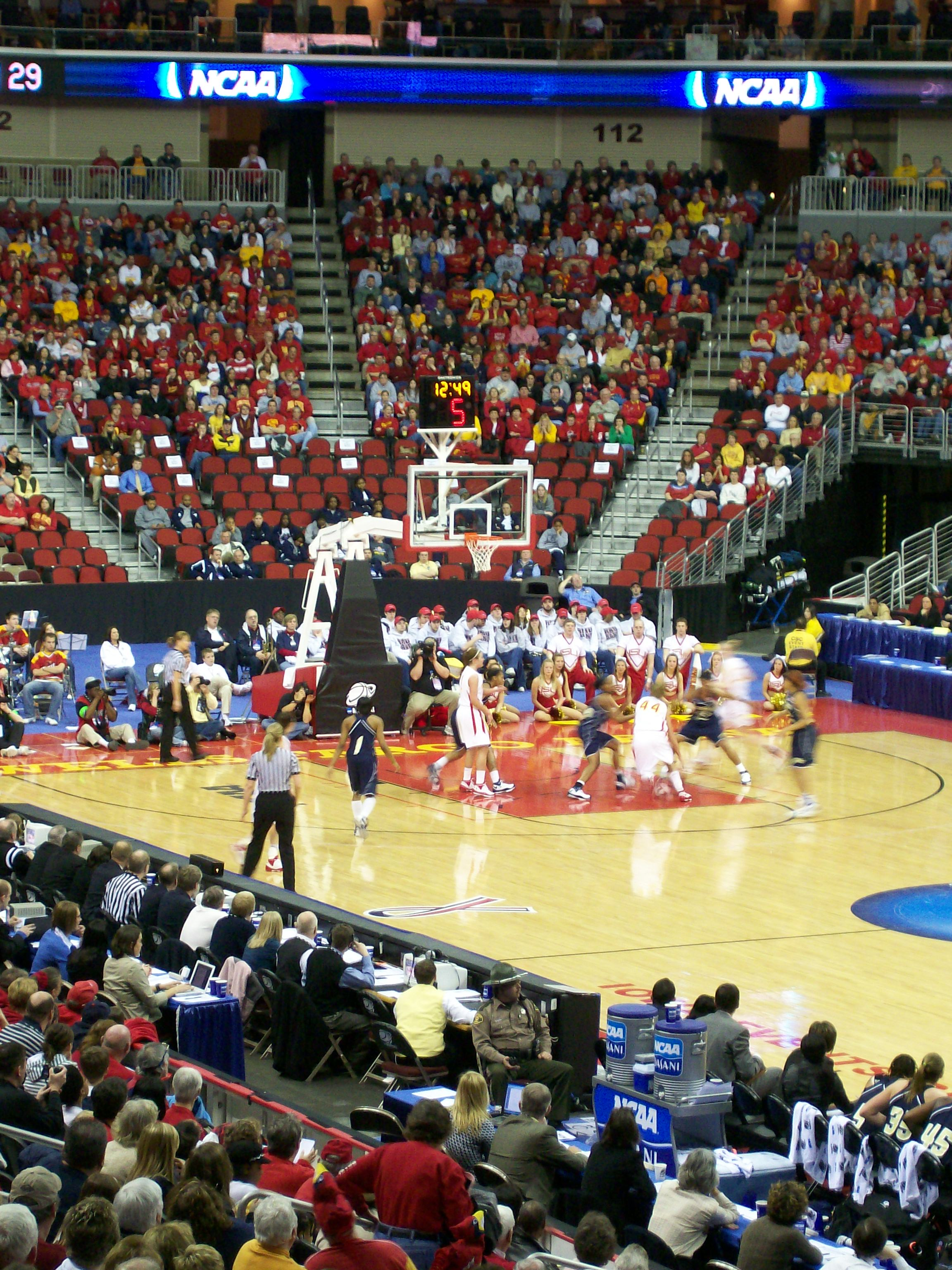
ISU NCAA game against Georgia Tech in 2008

The Cyclones have appeared in the NCAA tournament 24 times. They have a record of 23–24.

Year	Seed	Round	Opponent	Result
1997	#12	First Round	#5 Utah	L 57–66
1998	#4	First Round; Second Round	#13 Kent State #5 Rutgers	W 79–76; L 61–62
1999	#4	First Round; Second Round; Sweet Sixteen; Elite Eight	#13 Santa Clara #5 Oregon #1 Connecticut #3 Georgia	W 74–61; W 85–70; W 64–58; L 71–89
2000	#3	First Round; Second Round; Sweet Sixteen	#14 Saint Francis (PA) #6 Illinois #2 Penn State	W 92–63; W 79–68; L 65–66
2001	#2	First Round; Second Round; Sweet Sixteen	#15 Howard #7 Florida State #3 Vanderbilt	W 100–61; W 85–70; L 65–84
2002	#3	First Round; Second Round	#14 Temple #11 BYU	W 72–57; L 69–75
2005	#7	First Round	#10 Utah	L 61–73
2007	#6	First Round; Second Round	#11 Washington #3 Georgia	W 79–60; L 56–76
2008	#7	First Round; Second Round	#10 Georgia Tech #2 Rutgers	W 58–55; L 58–69
2009	#4	First Round; Second Round; Sweet Sixteen; Elite Eight	#13 East Tennessee State #12 Ball State #9 Michigan State #2 Stanford	W 85–53; W 71–57; W 69–68; L 53–74
2010	#4	First Round; Second Round; Sweet Sixteen	#13 Lehigh #12 Green Bay #1 Connecticut	W 79–42; W 60–56; L 36–74
2011	#7	First Round	#10 Marist	L 64–74
2012	#10	First Round	#7 Wisconsin-Green Bay	L 57–71
2013	#5	First Round; Second Round	#12 Gonzaga #4 Georgia	W 72–60; L 60–65
2014	#7	First Round	#10 Florida State	L 44–55
2015	#10	First Round	#7 Dayton	L 66–78
2017	#9	First Round	#8 Syracuse	L 65–85
2019	#3	First Round; Second Round	#14 New Mexico State #11 Missouri State	W 97–61; L 60–69
2021	#7	First Round; Second Round	#10 Michigan State #2 Texas A&M	W 79–75; L 82–84 (OT)
2022	#3	First Round; Second Round; Sweet Sixteen	#14 UT-Arlington #6 Georgia #10 Creighton	W 78–71; W 74–44; L 68–76
2023	#5	First Round	#12 Toledo	L 73–80
2024	#7	First Round; Second Round	#10 Maryland #2 Stanford	W 93–86; L 81–87 (OT)
2025	#11	First Four; First Round	#11 Princeton #6 Michigan	W 68–63; L 74–80
2026	#8	First Round	#9 Syracuse	L 63–72

== Head coaching records ==
Record table
Season	Coach	Overall	Conference	Standing	Postseason
Iowa State (no conference games) (1973–1976)
1973–1974	Gloria Crosby	8–8			
Gloria Crosby:		8–8			
1974–1975	Lynn Wheeler	12–9			
1975–1976	Lynn Wheeler	20–8			
Iowa State (Big Eight Conference – round-robin tournament only) (1976–1982)
1976–1977	Lynn Wheeler	19–11	1–2	6th	
1977–1978	Lynn Wheeler	13–15	1–2	6th	
1978–1979	Lynn Wheeler	10–19	1–2	7th	
1979–1980	Lynn Wheeler	6–19	0–3	8th	
Lynn Wheeler:		80–81			
1980–1981	Debbie Oing	7–18	1–2	6th	
1981–1982	Debbie Oing	11–20	1–2	4th	
Iowa State (Big Eight Conference) (1982–1996)
1982–1983	Debbie Oing	9–18	3–9	7th	
1983–1984	Debbie Oing	4–24	0–14	8th	
Debbie Oing:		31–80	3–23 (2 seasons)		
1984–1985	Pam Wettig	12–16	3–11	7th	
1985–1986	Pam Wettig	19–9	8–6	T-4th	
1986–1987	Pam Wettig	12–16	2–12	8th	
1987–1988	Pam Wettig	13–14	5–9	7th	
1988–1989	Pam Wettig	15–13	6–8	5th	
1989–1990	Pam Wettig	14–15	3–11	6th	
1990–1991	Pam Wettig	11–15	6–7	5th	
1991–1992	Pam Wettig	4–23	2–12	T-7th	
Pam Wettig:		100–121	35–76		
1992–1993	Theresa Becker	2–25	1–13	T-7th	
1993–1994	Theresa Becker	8–19	3–11	T-7th	
1994–1995	Theresa Becker	8–19	1–13	8th	
Theresa Becker:		18–63	5–37		
1995–1996	Bill Fennelly	17–10	5–9	6th	
Iowa State (Big 12 Conference) (1996–present)
1996–1997	Bill Fennelly	17–12	9–7	T-5th	NCAA 1st Round
1997–1998	Bill Fennelly	25–8	12–4	2nd	NCAA 2nd Round
1998–1999	Bill Fennelly	25–8	12–4	2nd	NCAA Elite Eight
1999–2000	Bill Fennelly	27–6	13–3	T-1st	NCAA Sweet 16
2000–2001	Bill Fennelly	27–6	12–4	3rd	NCAA Sweet 16
2001–2002	Bill Fennelly	24–9	9–7	6th	NCAA 2nd Round
2002–2003	Bill Fennelly	12–16	7–9	8th	
2003–2004	Bill Fennelly	18–15	7–9	T-8th	NIT Semifinal
2004–2005	Bill Fennelly	23–7	12–4	T-3rd	NCAA 1st Round
2005–2006	Bill Fennelly	18–13	7–9	T-8th	NIT 2nd Round
2006–2007	Bill Fennelly	26–9	10–6	T-4th	NCAA 2nd Round
2007–2008	Bill Fennelly	21–13	7–9	T-7th	NCAA 2nd Round
2008–2009	Bill Fennelly	27–9	11–5	T-3rd	NCAA Elite Eight
2009–2010	Bill Fennelly	25–8	11–5	T-2nd	NCAA Sweet Sixteen
2010–2011	Bill Fennelly	22–11	9–7	5th	NCAA 1st Round
2011–2012	Bill Fennelly	18–13	9–9	T-4th	NCAA 1st Round
2012–2013	Bill Fennelly	24–9	12–6	2nd	NCAA 2nd Round
2013–2014	Bill Fennelly	20–11	9–9	5th	NCAA 1st Round
2014–2015	Bill Fennelly	18–13	9–9	5th	NCAA 1st Round
2015–2016	Bill Fennelly	13–17	5–13	8th	
2016–2017	Bill Fennelly	18–13	9–9	5th	NCAA 1st Round
2017–2018	Bill Fennelly	14–17	7–11	T-7th	
2018–2019	Bill Fennelly	26–9	13–5	2nd	NCAA 2nd Round
2019–2020	Bill Fennelly	18–11	10–8	T–4th	Cancelled due to COVID-19
2020–2021	Bill Fennelly	17–11	12–6	4th	NCAA second round
2021–2022	Bill Fennelly	28–6	14–4	2nd	NCAA Sweet Sixteen
2022-2023	Bill Fennelly	22–9	11–7	3rd	NCAA First Round
2023-2024	Bill Fennelly	21–12	12–6	T-4th	NCAA Second Round
2024-2025	Bill Fennelly	23–12	12–6	7th	NCAA Second Round
2025-2026	Bill Fennelly	14–5	2–5		
Bill Fennelly:		644–328	298–214		
Total:		896–679			
National champion Postseason invitational champion Conference regular season champion Conference regular season and conference tournament champion Division regular season champion Division regular season and conference tournament champion Conference tournament champion

== Hilton Coliseum ==
The Cyclones play at Hilton Coliseum, on the campus of Iowa State University, in Ames, Iowa. The Cyclones’ yearly attendance average has grown from 733 fans per game the season before Coach Fennelly came to ISU to over 10,000 per contest in 2011–2012. ISU’s attendance has ranked among the top 11 schools nationally in each of the last 17 seasons, including ranking fourth for three straight years from 1999 to 2002 and fourth or higher for seven straight years from 2007 to 2014. Iowa State was ranked 2nd in attendance in 2013 and 2014. The Cyclones enjoyed their first-ever sellout crowd in a 2004 WNIT/NIT doubleheader against Saint Joseph's. In 2009, Iowa State had a higher total attendance with over 156,000 than 16 of the 31 Division I conferences.

Attendance
Season	Coach	Avg. attendance	Home games	National rank
1986–87	Pam Wettig	427	12	
1987–88	Pam Wettig	944	10	
1988–89	Pam Wettig	579	12	
1989–90	Pam Wettig	635	10	
1990–91	Pam Wettig	533	9	
1991–92	Pam Wettig	423	11	
1992–93	Theresa Becker	653	11	
1993–94	Theresa Becker	725	13	
1994–95	Theresa Becker	733	14	
1995–96	Bill Fennelly	1,706	10	
1996–97	Bill Fennelly	1,688	13	
1997–98	Bill Fennelly	3,775	17	
1998–99	Bill Fennelly	6,115	15	11
1999–00	Bill Fennelly	11,184	16	4
2000–01	Bill Fennelly	11,370	16	4
2001–02	Bill Fennelly	10,296	16	4
2002–03	Bill Fennelly	9,632	14	5
2003–04	Bill Fennelly	8,021	18	9
2004–05	Bill Fennelly	7,396	15	9
2005–06	Bill Fennelly	7,668	16	7
2006–07	Bill Fennelly	8,906	16	7
2007–08	Bill Fennelly	9,388	17	4
2008–09	Bill Fennelly	9,754	16	3
2009–10	Bill Fennelly	9,316	19	3
2010–11	Bill Fennelly	9,370	17	4
2011–12	Bill Fennelly	10,125	16	3
2012–13	Bill Fennelly	9,970	15	2
2013–14	Bill Fennelly	9,916	17	2
2014–15	Bill Fennelly	9,289	17	4
2015–16	Bill Fennelly	9,833	15	3
2016–17	Bill Fennelly	9,106	19	3
2017–18	Bill Fennelly	9,870	15	3
2018–19	Bill Fennelly	9,573	20	2
2019–20	Bill Fennelly	9,690	17	3
2020–21	Bill Fennelly	698	14	*

== Retired jerseys ==
=== Retired Jerseys ===
Retired Jerseys
Year Retired	Player	Jersey Number
1985	Tonya Burns	#42
2004	Jayme Olson	#53
2005	Megan Taylor	#51
2010	Angie Wellie	#32

== See also ==
- Iowa State Cyclones men's basketball
