= 1999–2000 Connecticut Huskies women's basketball team =

Intercollegiate basketball season

1999–2000 Connecticut Huskies women's basketball

NCAA tournament National Champions Big East tournament champions Big East regular season champions
- Conference: Big East

Ranking
- Coaches: No. 1
- AP: No. 1
- Record: 36–1 (16–0 Big East)
- Head coach: Geno Auriemma (15th season)
- Associate head coach: Chris Dailey
- Assistant coaches: Tonya Cardoza; Jamelle Elliott
- Home arena: Harry A. Gampel Pavilion; Hartford Civic Center

1999–2000 Big East Conference women's basketball standings
	Conf.				Overall
Team	W		L	PCT	W		L	PCT
No. 1 Connecticut †	16	–	0	1.000	36	–	1	.973
No. 9 Notre Dame	15	–	1	.938	27	–	5	.844
No. 8 Rutgers	12	–	4	.750	26	–	8	.765
No. 17 Boston College	12	–	4	.750	26	–	9	.743
Georgetown	9	–	7	.563	17	–	13	.567
Pittsburgh	7	–	9	.438	16	–	13	.552
Villanova	7	–	9	.438	15	–	15	.500
Miami (FL)	7	–	9	.438	14	–	15	.483
Seton Hall	5	–	11	.313	11	–	16	.407
St. John's	5	–	11	.313	11	–	18	.379
Providence	5	–	11	.313	10	–	17	.370
Syracuse	3	–	13	.188	10	–	18	.357
West Virginia	1	–	15	.063	6	–	22	.214
† 2000 Big East Tournament winner Rankings from AP poll

The 1999–2000 Connecticut Huskies women's basketball team represented the University of Connecticut (UConn) during the 1999–2000 NCAA Division I women's basketball season. The Huskies, led by the Hall of Fame head coach Geno Auriemma in his 15th season at UConn, played their home games at Harry A. Gampel Pavilion and the Hartford Civic Center, and were members of the Big East Conference. UConn finished the regular season with a record of 27–1 and went 16–0 in the Big East to win the regular season conference championship. They also won the Big East tournament. Then, they won the NCAA Tournament, defeating Tennessee in the finals to win their second national championship.

== Roster ==
Listed are the student athletes who were members of the 1999–2000 team.

Name
Stacy Hansmeyer
Paige Sauer
Svetlana Abrosimova
Marci Czel
Shea Ralph
Christine Rigby
Kelly Schumacher
Sue Bird
Swin Cash
Asjha Jones
Keirsten Walters
Tamika Williams
Kennitra Johnson

=== Regular season summary ===
UConn ended the 1998–99 season on a disappointing note. They were selected as one of the top four seeds in the NCAA tournament, but lost in the regional semifinal to Iowa State, a team playing in the round of 16 for their first time. The AP story summarized the results: "Iowa State finally gave the NCAA women's basketball tournament an upset worth talking about." Despite that early exit from the prior year's tournament, there were ranked number four by the AP at the end of the season, and started the next season as the top-ranked team in both the AP and USA Today coaches poll.

UConn started the season on the road, taking on Iowa. It was a defensive battle early on, but UConn built the lead to double digits and then went on a 9–0 run that helped put the game away. UConn ended up with the win 73–45, with Tamika Williams recording a double double with 18 points and 11 rebounds. UConn hosted Kentucky in its home opener, playing in the inaugural Coaches versus Cancer challenge. Kentucky started out strong, leading 12–2, prompting Coach Auriemma to call a timeout. The Huskies responded with a 13–2 run. Auriemma strongly disagreed with the officials calls, leading to technical fouls and an ejection from the game in the first half (his first ejection since 1992). Kentucky had the lead at halftime, and the game was still tied with just under two minutes remaining in the game. A three-pointer by Svetlana Abrosimova with just over a minute left helped clinch the victory, and UConn prevailed with a 68–62 win.

UConn fared better in its next three home games, reaching the century mark in each of the games. UConn defeated Old Dominion 109 – 66, Pepperdine by a score of 101–58, then took on the 10th ranked Illinois and won by a score of 100–79. Shea Ralph earned the player of the game honors in the Pepperdine game with 22 points and seven steals. She didn't miss a shot in the first half and only missed once in the second half.

UConn travelled to Florida to play in the Honda Elite 4 Classic against 14th ranked Penn State, coming away with the win 87–74. Auriemma was miked up by the ESPN crew which caught him accidentally complaining about turnover by Svetlana Abrosimova muttering “Goddamn Europeans”. The Huskies brought their blue road uniforms, not realizing they were scheduled to be the home team. Penn State also wears blue and white uniforms so the Huskies had to play in their practice jerseys.

After defeating Seton Hall for the first Big East game, UConn returned home to take on sixth-ranked UCLA. Abrosimova had 19 points, 13 rebounds and nine assists, narrowly missing a triple-double, helping to lead the Huskies to a 106–64 win. It was the 200th career win for coach Auriemma. Swin Cash had a play she would just as soon forget — she secured the rebound of a missed free throw by UCLA and immediately squared up and scored a jumper into the wrong basket.

The team traveled to Oklahoma and secured an 84–68 win, then returned home to face the number three team in the nation Louisiana Tech. Abrosimova lead the team with 25 points, and the Huskies defeated the Lady Techsters by a margin of 27 points 90–63. The Huskies then travel to Georgetown announced their second Big East victory with an 87–48 win.

Next up was one of the most anticipated games of the year with UConn facing Tennessee in Tennessee in front of more than 20,000 fans. Fittingly, it was a clash between the top two teams in the nation with UConn coming in at number one and Tennessee at number two. UConn was the early aggressor, but Tennessee came back late and cut the margin to three points with about three minutes left. Four of UConn's starters had four fouls each. Then Michele Snow drew a fifth foul on UConn's center Paige Sauer, sending her to the line for two free throws. Unfortunately, Snow celebrated by slamming the ball to the court which earned her a technical foul. Snow missed both of her free-throw attempts. Sue Bird shot the technical foul shots, making both of them. Bird was the leading scorer with 25 points on eight for 10 from the field, UConn ended up with the win 74–67.

The next five games, West Virginia, Pittsburgh, Rutgers, Holy Cross, and Villanova were all double-digit wins, with only the home game against #11 Rutgers providing any concern. The Scarlet Knights had a nine point advantage in the first half but the Huskies went on a 17–0 run to close the first half. Rytgers never threatened again and UConn ended up with a 15 point win.

The Huskies then took on 19th ranked Boston College and Miami. UConn was behind at halftime in the Boston College game and it was still close (a three-point game) with under a minute left, but UConn held on for the win 84–77. The Miami game was not as close, with UConn more than doubling up Miami 84–36 in Miami.

The Huskies then played Tennessee again, a relatively rare instance of a home and home series against a nonconference team. UConn won the game in Knoxville but were not so fortunate at home. The game went to the wire with Tennessee prevailing 72–71 for the first loss of the season by the Huskies. After Tennessee, UConn returned to Big East play with the final eight games of the regular-season. All were wins, and all except one were by double digits. The lone exception was a hard-fought game against the 10th ranked Rutgers team. UConn trailed at halftime, but came back to eke out a four point win, 49–45.

=== Big East tournament ===
The Huskies earned a first round bye, along with Notre Dame, Rutgers and Boston College. Their first game was in the quarterfinals against St. John's. The game was never close with UConn going on to win 85–41. UConn faced 17th ranked Boston College in the semifinals, a team that had forced a close game against the Huskies in January, losing only by seven points. This time the result would be very different led by Tamika Williams who scored "16 points in 17 minutes on 8-for-10 shooting". UConn defeated Boston College 79–54. The championship game featured UConn and 8th-ranked Rutgers. Again, UConn faced the team that had challenged them in the most recent game in February. In that game, UConn escaped with a four point win. Again, UConn rose to the challenge and defeated the Scarlet Knights by 20 points, 79–59. Tamika Williams was named MVP of the tournament.

=== NCAA Tournament ===
UConn's first round opponent was against the Hampton Lady Pirates, appearing in their first ever NCAA tournament. The outcome was not in much doubt when UConn set the tournament record for points in a half with 65 points in the opening half. The final score was 115–45, and the 71 point margin made the NCAA a list of "the biggest blowouts of March madness women's history".

Clemson was the second round opponent for the Huskies. It was only the third meeting between UConn and Clemson, with Clemson holding onto the distinction of beating UConn at home in the 1990 tournament, one of only two home NCAA tournament losses in history for UConn(as of 2000). Clemson played UConn relatively even in the second half but a 14–0 run in the first half but the target isn't too deep a hole, and UConn went on to win 83–45.

In the Sweet 16 round, UConn took on Oklahoma. Although they had a 15 point lead at halftime, they couldn't rest easy because as Jim Fuller pointed out, "Oklahoma had opened some eyes by rallying from a 17-point deficit to beat defending national champion Purdue in the second round." The Huskies went on to win 102–80.

Sue Bird gave fans a scare when she crashed into the basket in the second half, grabbing her right knee and limping to the bench. The Huskies had taken an early lead against LSU, but the Tigers cut the lead to a single point and were down only five points at halftime. With Svetlana Abrosimova leading the team with 25 points, six rebounds and five assists (earning her the regional's Most Outstanding Player honors), the Huskies expanded the lead in the second half and ended up with the win 86–71 to send UConn to its first Final Four since 1996.

UConn faced Penn State in the opening round of the Final Four. The event was held in Philadelphia in both schools and strong ties to the state. Penn State, of course, was playing in its home state of Pennsylvania, while UConn's head coach Geno Auriemma grew up in the Philly area and started his coaching career in the state. The two teams had met earlier in the season, with UConn taken an early lead in the December game which they never relinquished. This game started out much closer, but Penn State only four points behind 30 minutes into the game. The Huskies then went on a 20–6 run To open up a commanding lead, and UConn went on to win 87–74. This led to a match up with Tennessee, a team they had already played twice this season with each team winning away from the home-court.

In the championship game, Tennessee wasn't hitting well early, making only one of their first 13 shots from the field but there were only behind by five at that point. Then the Huskies went on a 12–2 run to take a 21–6 lead. UConn extended the lead to as much is 27 points. Geno Auriemma remarked,

"I thought if we could play 40 minutes of really solid basketball, we'd be all right... We did. Our defense was just spectacular tonight."

Kelly Schumacher set an NCAA Final Four record with nine blocks, helping UConn to go on to win 71–52 to win the national championship for the second time on the fifth anniversary of the first one.

== Schedule ==
Date time, TV	Rank^{#}	Opponent^{#}	Result	Record	Site city, state
Regular Season
11/21/1999*	No. 1	at Iowa	W 73–45	1–0	Carver–Hawkeye Arena (3,260); Iowa City, IA
11/24/1999*	No. 1	Kentucky; Coaches vs. Cancer Challenge	W 68–62	2–0	Hartford Civic Center (15,777); Hartford, CT
11/26/1999*	No. 1	Old Dominion	W 109–66	3–0	Hartford Civic Center (15,817); Hartford, CT
11/28/1999*	No. 1	Pepperdine	W 101–58	4–0	Harry A. Gampel Pavilion (10,027); Storrs, CT
11/30/1999*	No. 1	No. 10 Illinois	W 100–79	5–0	Harry A. Gampel Pavilion (10,027); Storrs, CT
12/05/1999*; 1:00 p.m., ESPN	No. 1	vs. No. 14 Penn State; Honda Elite 4 Classic	W 87–74	6–0	Disney's Wide World of Sports Complex (3,700); Bay Lake, FL
12/08/1999; 7:00 p.m.	No. 1	at Seton Hall	W 88–45	7–0 (1–0)	Walsh Gymnasium (1,811); South Orange, NJ
12/23/1999*; 2:00 p.m.	No. 1	No. 6 UCLA	W 106–64	8–0	Harry A. Gampel Pavilion (10,027); Storrs, CT
12/29/1999*; 7:00 p.m.	No. 1	at Oklahoma	W 84–68	9–0	Lloyd Noble Center (10,713); Norman, OK
01/02/2000*; 7:00 p.m.	No. 1	No. 3 Louisiana Tech	W 90–63	10–0	Harry A. Gampel Pavilion (10,027); Storrs, CT
01/04/2000; 7:00 p.m., CPTV	No. 1	at Georgetown	W 87–48	11–0 (2–0)	McDonough Gymnasium (1,175); Washington, D.C.
01/08/2000*; 4:00 p.m., CBS	No. 1	at No. 2 Tennessee; Rivalry	W 74–66	12–0	Thompson–Boling Arena (23,385); Knoxville, TN
01/12/2000; 7:30 p.m.	No. 1	West Virginia	W 75–35	13–0 (3–0)	Harry A. Gampel Pavilion (10,027); Storrs, CT
01/15/2000; 7:30 p.m., CPTV	No. 1	Pittsburgh	W 88–36	14–0 (4–0)	Harry A. Gampel Pavilion (10,027); Storrs, CT
01/17/2000; 3:00 p.m.	No. 1	No. 11 Rutgers; Rivalry	W 65–50	15–0 (5–0)	Hartford Civic Center (16,294); Hartford, CT
01/20/2000*; 7:00 p.m., CPTV	No. 1	at Holy Cross	W 89–51	16–0	Hart Center (4,000); Worcester, MA
01/22/2000; 12:00 noon, CPTV	No. 1	at Villanova	W 79–46	17–0 (6–0)	The Pavilion (4,059); Villanova, PA
01/26/2000; 7:30 p.m., CPTV	No. 1	No. 19 Boston College	W 84–77	18–0 (7–0)	Harry A. Gampel Pavilion (10,027); Storrs, CT
01/29/2000; 4:00 p.m.	No. 1	at Miami	W 84–36	19–0 (8–0)	Miami Arena (9,276); Miami, FL
02/02/2000*; 7:00 p.m., ESPN	No. 1	No. 4 Tennessee; Rivalry	L 71–72	19–1	Harry A. Gampel Pavilion (10,027); Storrs, CT
02/05/2000; 7:30 p.m.	No. 1	Seton Hall	W 86–34	20–1 (9–0)	Harry A. Gampel Pavilion (10,027); Storrs, CT
02/08/2000; 7:30 p.m.	No. 1	Miami	W 93–46	21–1 (10–0)	Harry A. Gampel Pavilion (10,027); Storrs, CT
02/12/2000	No. 1	at No. 10 Rutgers; Rivalry	W 49–45	22–1 (11–0)	Louis Brown Athletic Center (8,579); Piscataway, NJ
02/15/2000; 7:30 p.m., CPTV	No. 1	at St. John's	W 85–43	23–1 (12–0)	Carnesecca Arena (1,625); New York, NY
02/18/2000; 7:30 p.m.	No. 1	Syracuse	W 100–74	24–1 (13–0)	Harry A. Gampel Pavilion (10,027); Storrs, CT
02/23/2000; 7:00 p.m., CPTV	No. 1	at West Virginia	W 100–28	25–1 (14–0)	WVU Coliseum (1,213); Morgantown, WV
02/26/2000; 12:00 noon	No. 1	No. 5 Notre Dame; Rivalry	W 77–59	26–1 (15–0)	Hartford Civic Center (16,294); Hartford, CT
02/29/2000	No. 1	at Providence	W 102–68	27–1 (16–0)	Providence Civic Center (5,497); Providence, RI
Big East tournament
03/05/2000; 2:00 p.m.	No. 1	St. John's; Quarterfinals	W 85–41	28–1	Harry A. Gampel Pavilion (10,027); Storrs, CT
03/06/2000; 6:00 p.m., Fox Sports	No. 1	No. 17 Boston College; Semifinals	W 79–54	29–1	Harry A. Gampel Pavilion (10,027); Storrs, CT
03/07/2000; 7:30 p.m.	No. 1	No. 8 Rutgers; Championship/Rivalry	W 79–59	30–1	Harry A. Gampel Pavilion (10,027); Storrs, CT
NCAA tournament
03/17/2000*	(1) No. 1	(16) Hampton; First Round	W 116–45	31–1	Harry A. Gampel Pavilion (10,027); Storrs, CT
03/19/2000*	(1) No. 1	(9) Clemson; Second Round	W 83–45	32–1	Harry A. Gampel Pavilion (10,027); Storrs, CT
03/25/2000*	(1) No. 1	vs. (5) No. 18 Oklahoma; Sweet Sixteen	W 102–80	33–1	Siegel Center (5,702); Richmond, VA
03/27/2000*	(1) No. 1	vs. (3) No. 15 LSU; Elite Eight	W 86–71	34–1	Siegel Center (5,872); Richmond, VA
03/31/2000*	(1) No. 1	vs. (2) No. 6 Penn State; Final Four	W 89–67	35–1	First Union Center (20,060); Philadelphia, PA
04/02/2000*	(1) No. 1	vs. (1) No. 2 Tennessee; Championship/Rivalry	W 71–52	36–1	First Union Center (20,060); Philadelphia, PA
*Non-conference game. ^{#}Rankings from AP Poll. (#) Tournament seedings in parentheses. All times are in EST.

== Rankings ==
Ranking movements
	Week																				
Poll	Pre	1	2	3	4	5	6	7	8	9	10	11	12	13	14	15	16	17	18	19	Final
AP	1	1	1	1	1	1	1	1	1	1	1	1	1	1	1	1	1	1		1	
Coaches	1	1	1	1	1	1	1	1	1	1	1	1	1	1	1	1	1	1			1

== Awards ==
- Geno Auriemma
  - WBCA National Coach of the Year
  - Naismith College Coach of the Year
  - Associated Press College Basketball Coach of the Year
  - Big East Conference Coach of the Year
- Shea Ralph
  - Honda Sports Award for basketball
  - NCAA basketball tournament Most Outstanding Player
  - Big East Conference Women's Basketball Player of the Year
