= 2000 Big 12 Conference women's basketball tournament =

- Classification: Division I
- Teams: 12
- Site: Municipal Auditorium; Kansas City, Missouri
- Champions: Iowa State (1st title)
- Winning coach: Bill Fennelly (1st title)
- MVP: Edwina Brown (Texas)
- Attendance: 29,961 (overall); 9,130 (championship)
- Television: Metro Sports, FSN

1999–2000 Big 12 Conference women's basketball standings
	Conf.				Overall
Team	W		L	PCT	W		L	PCT
No. 7 Iowa State †	13	–	3	.813	27	–	6	.818
No. 11 Texas Tech	13	–	3	.813	28	–	5	.848
No. 18 Oklahoma	13	–	3	.813	25	–	8	.758
Kansas	11	–	5	.688	20	–	10	.667
Nebraska	10	–	6	.625	18	–	13	.581
Texas	9	–	7	.563	21	–	13	.618
Missouri	7	–	9	.438	18	–	12	.600
Kansas State	6	–	10	.375	13	–	17	.433
Oklahoma State	5	–	11	.313	14	–	16	.467
Colorado	4	–	12	.250	10	–	19	.345
Texas A&M	3	–	13	.188	11	–	16	.407
Baylor	2	–	14	.125	7	–	20	.259
† 2000 Big 12 Tournament winner Rankings from AP poll

The 2000 Big 12 Conference women's basketball championship is the 2000 edition of the Big 12 Conference's championship tournament. The tournament was held at the Municipal Auditorium in Kansas City, Missouri between March 7–9 and on March 12, 2000. Iowa State University won their first Big 12 Conference women's basketball tournament championship beating the University of Texas, 75–65.

== Seeding ==
The Tournament consisted of a 12 team single-elimination tournament with the top 4 seeds receiving a bye.

2000 Big 12 Conference women's basketball tournament seeds
Seed	School	Conf.	Over.	Tiebreaker
1	Iowa State ‡#	13–3	27–6	
2	Texas Tech c#	13–3	28–5	
3	Oklahoma c#	13–3	25–8	
4	Kansas #	11–5	20–10	
5	Nebraska	10–6	18–13	
6	Texas	9–7	21–13	
7	Missouri	7–9	18–12	
8	Kansas State	6–10	13–17	
9	Oklahoma State	5–11	14–16	
10	Colorado	4–12	10–19	
11	Texas A&M	3–13	11–16	
12	Baylor	2–14	7–20	
‡ – Big 12 Conference regular season champions, and tournament No. 1 seed. c – Big 12 Conference regular season co-champion, not tournament No. 1 seed. # – Received a single-bye in the conference tournament. Overall records include all games played in the Big 12 Conference tournament.

== Schedule ==
Session	Game	Time	Matchup	Television	Attendance
First Round – Tuesday, March 7
1	1	12:00 pm	#9 Oklahoma State 67 vs #8 Kansas State 59		3,770
1	2	2:20 pm	#5 Nebraska 82 vs #12 Baylor 61		3,770
2	3	6:00 pm	#10 Colorado 83 vs #7 Missouri 68		4,023
2	4	8:20 pm	#6 Texas 83 vs #11 Texas A&M 72		4,023
Quarterfinals – Wednesday, March 8
3	5	12:00 pm	#1 Iowa State 93 vs #9 Oklahoma State 58	Metro Sports	3,559
3	6	2:20 pm	#5 Nebraska 80 vs #4 Kansas 67	Metro Sports	3,559
4	7	6:00 pm	#2 Texas Tech 76 vs #10 Colorado 60	Metro Sports	3,614
4	8	8:20 pm	#6 Texas 71 vs #3 Oklahoma 68	Metro Sports	3,614
Semifinals – Thursday, March 9
5	9	5:05 pm	#1 Iowa State 85 vs #5 Nebraska 48	FSN	5,865
5	10	7:30 pm	#6 Texas 68 vs #2 Texas Tech 50	FSN	5,865
Final – Saturday, March 11
6	11	7:08 pm	#1 Iowa State 75 vs #6 Texas 65	FSN	9,130
Game times in CT. #-Rankings denote tournament seed

== Tournament bracket ==
First Round (March 7)
8	Kansas State	59
9	Oklahoma State	67
5	Nebraska	82
12	Baylor	61
7	Missouri	68
10	Colorado	83
6	Texas	83
11	Texas A&M	72

Second Round (March 8)
1	Iowa State	93
9	Oklahoma State	58
4	Kansas	67
5	Nebraska	80
2	Texas Tech	76
10	Colorado	70
3	Oklahoma	68
6	Texas	71

Semifinals (March 9)
1	Iowa State	85
5	Nebraska	48
2	Texas Tech	50
6	Texas	68

Finals (March 12)
1	Iowa State	75
6	Texas	65

== All-Tournament Team ==
Most Outstanding Player – Edwina Brown, Texas

Player	Team
Edwina Brown	Texas
Angie Welle	Iowa State
Stacy Frese	Iowa State
Desiree Francis	Iowa State
Nicole Kubik	Nebraska

== See also ==
- 2000 Big 12 Conference men's basketball tournament
- 2000 NCAA Women's Division I Basketball Tournament
- 1999–2000 NCAA Division I women's basketball rankings
