= 1999–2000 Rutgers Scarlet Knights women's basketball team =

Intercollegiate basketball season

1999–2000 Rutgers Scarlet Knights women's basketball

NCAA tournament, Final Four
- Conference: Big East Conference

Ranking
- Coaches: No. 4
- AP: No. 8
- Record: 26–8 (12–4 Big East)
- Head coach: C. Vivian Stringer (5th season)
- Assistant coaches: Jolette Law; Betsy Yonkman; Larry Lawler
- Home arena: Louis Brown Athletic Center

1999–2000 Big East Conference women's basketball standings
	Conf.				Overall
Team	W		L	PCT	W		L	PCT
No. 1 Connecticut †	16	–	0	1.000	36	–	1	.973
No. 9 Notre Dame	15	–	1	.938	27	–	5	.844
No. 8 Rutgers	12	–	4	.750	26	–	8	.765
No. 17 Boston College	12	–	4	.750	26	–	9	.743
Georgetown	9	–	7	.563	17	–	13	.567
Pittsburgh	7	–	9	.438	16	–	13	.552
Villanova	7	–	9	.438	15	–	15	.500
Miami (FL)	7	–	9	.438	14	–	15	.483
Seton Hall	5	–	11	.313	11	–	16	.407
St. John's	5	–	11	.313	11	–	18	.379
Providence	5	–	11	.313	10	–	17	.370
Syracuse	3	–	13	.188	10	–	18	.357
West Virginia	1	–	15	.063	6	–	22	.214
† 2000 Big East Tournament winner Rankings from AP poll

The 1999–2000 Rutgers Scarlet Knights women's basketball team represented Rutgers University during the 1999–2000 NCAA Division I women's basketball season. The Scarlet Knights, led by 5th year head coach C. Vivian Stringer, played their home games at the Louis Brown Athletic Center, better known as The RAC, as a member of the Big East Conference.

They finished the season 26–8, 12–4 in Big East play to finish tied for third place. They advanced to the championship game of the Big East women's tournament where they lost to No. 1 UConn. They received an at-large bid to the NCAA women's basketball tournament as No. 2 seed in the West region, and they would reach the first Final Four in program history. Rutgers became the third school that Coach Stringer would lead to the Final Four (Cheyney State, Iowa).

== Roster ==
1999–2000 Rutgers Scarlet Knights women's basketball team
Players
Coaches

Pos.	#	Name	Height	Year	Previous school	Hometown
G/F	3	Usha Gilmore	6 ft 0 in (1.83 m)	Sr
G/F	34	Shawnetta Stewart	5 ft 10 in (1.78 m)	Sr	University City	Philadelphia, PA
F	40	Linda Miles	6 ft 0 in (1.83 m)	Jr	Hughes	Cincinnati, OH
G	43	Tasha Pointer	5 ft 6 in (1.68 m)	Jr	Whitney Young	Chicago, IL
C	55	Tammy Sutton-Brown	6 ft 4 in (1.93 m)	Jr	Markham District	Markham, ON

Head coach

- C. Vivian Stringer (Slippery Rock)

Assistant coach(es)

Legend

- (C) Team captain
- (S) Suspended
- (I) Ineligible
- (W) Walk-on
- Injured
- Current redshirt

Roster

== Schedule ==
Date time, TV	Rank^{#}	Opponent^{#}	Result	Record	Site (attendance) city, state
Regular season
Nov 14, 1999*	No. 4	vs. No. 20 NC State; State Farm Tip-Off Classic	L 55–68	0–1	Thompson–Boling Arena; Knoxville, TN
Nov 26, 1999*	No. 8	Northeastern; Rutgers Coca-Cola Classic	W 61–39	1–1	Louis Brown Athletic Center; Piscataway, NJ
Nov 27, 1999*	No. 8	Wisconsin; Rutgers Coca-Cola Classic	W 63–61	2–1	Louis Brown Athletic Center; Piscataway, NJ
Dec 1, 1999*	No. 7	at Ohio State	W 46–35	3–1	Value City Arena; Columbus, OH
Dec 4, 1999*	No. 7	at George Washington	L 58–63	3–2	Charles E. Smith Center; Washington, D.C.
Dec 8, 1999	No. 13	Pittsburgh	W 58–52	4–2 (1–0)	Louis Brown Athletic Center; Piscataway, NJ
Dec 18, 1999*	No. 16	Texas	W 68–64	5–2	Louis Brown Athletic Center; Piscataway, NJ
Dec 21, 1999*	No. 15	UCLA	W 72–46	6–2	Louis Brown Athletic Center; Piscataway, NJ
Dec 30, 1999*	No. 12	USC	W 76–59	7–2	Louis Brown Athletic Center; Piscataway, NJ
Jan 2, 2000*	No. 12	UMass	W 66–52	8–2	Louis Brown Athletic Center; Piscataway, NJ
Jan 5, 2000	No. 11	Miami (FL)	W 65–45	9–2 (2–0)	Louis Brown Athletic Center; Piscataway, NJ
Jan 8, 2000	No. 11	at Seton Hall	W 65–45	10–2 (3–0)	Walsh Gymnasium; South Orange, NJ
Jan 12, 2000	No. 9	at Georgetown	W 60–48	11–2 (4–0)	McDonough Gymnasium; Washington, D.C.
Jan 15, 2000	No. 9	Villanova	L 65–66 ^{OT}	11–3 (4–1)	Louis Brown Athletic Center; Piscataway, NJ
Jan 17, 2000	No. 11	at No. 1 Connecticut; Rivalry	L 50–65	11–4 (4–2)	Hartford Civic Center (16,294); Hartford, CT
Jan 22, 2000	No. 13	at West Virginia	W 55–49	12–4 (5–2)	WVU Coliseum; Morgantown, WV
Jan 26, 2000	No. 13	Seton Hall	W 62–46	13–4 (6–2)	Louis Brown Athletic Center; Piscataway, NJ
Feb 1, 2000*	No. 11	Old Dominion	W 58–50	14–4	Louis Brown Athletic Center; Piscataway, NJ
Feb 6, 2000	No. 11	Syracuse	W 77–41	15–4 (7–2)	Louis Brown Athletic Center; Piscataway, NJ
Feb 9, 2000	No. 11	at Providence	W 81–68	16–4 (8–2)	Alumni Hall; Providence, RI
Feb 12, 2000	No. 11	No. 1 Connecticut; Rivalry	L 45–49	16–5 (8–3)	Louis Brown Athletic Center (8,579); Piscataway, NJ
Feb 15, 2000	No. 8	at Syracuse	W 56–51	17–5 (9–3)	Manley Field House; Syracuse, NY
Feb 19, 2000	No. 8	No. 5 Notre Dame	L 74–78 ^{OT}	17–6 (9–4)	Louis Brown Athletic Center; Piscataway, NJ
Feb 23, 2000	No. 8	Boston College	W 73–51	18–6 (10–4)	Louis Brown Athletic Center; Piscataway, NJ
Feb 26, 2000	No. 8	at St. John's	W 70–47	19–6 (11–4)	Alumni Hall; New York, New York
Feb 29, 2000	No. 8	at Villanova	W 76–60	20–6 (12–4)	Palestra; Philadelphia, PA
Big East Tournament
Mar 5, 2000*	No. 8	vs. Villanova; Quarterfinals	W 61–32	21–6	Harry A. Gampel Pavilion (10,027); Storrs, CT
Mar 6, 2000*	No. 8	vs. No. 9 Notre Dame; Semifinals	W 81–72 ^{OT}	22–6	Harry A. Gampel Pavilion (10,027); Storrs, CT
Mar 7, 2000*	No. 8	No. 1 Connecticut; Championship game/Rivalry	L 59–79	22–7	Harry A. Gampel Pavilion (10,027); Storrs, CT
NCAA Tournament
Mar 18, 2000*	(2 W) No. 8	(15 W) Holy Cross; First round	W 91–70	23–7	Louis Brown Athletic Center; Piscataway, NJ
Mar 20, 2000*	(2 W) No. 8	(10 W) Saint Joseph's; Second round	W 59–39	24–7	Louis Brown Athletic Center; Piscataway, NJ
Mar 25, 2000*	(2 W) No. 8	vs. (11 W) UAB; Regional Semifinal – Sweet Sixteen	W 60–45	25–7	Veterans Memorial Coliseum; Portland, OR
Mar 27, 2000*	(2 W) No. 8	vs. (1 W) No. 2 Georgia; Regional Final – Elite Eight	W 59–51	26–7	Veterans Memorial Coliseum; Portland, OR
Mar 31, 2000*	(2 W) No. 8	vs. (1 ME) No. 2 Tennessee; National Semifinal – Final Four	L 54–64	26–8	First Union Center (20,060); Philadelphia, PA
*Non-conference game. ^{#}Rankings from AP Poll. (#) Tournament seedings in parentheses. All times are in Eastern Time.

== See also ==
1999–2000 Rutgers Scarlet Knights men's basketball team
