= 1999–2000 Clemson Tigers women's basketball team =

Women's college basketball season

1999–2000 Clemson Tigers women's basketball

NCAA Tournament, Second Round
- Conference: Atlantic Coast Conference
- Record: 19–12 (9–7 ACC)
- Head coach: Jim Davis (13th season)
- Home arena: Littlejohn Coliseum

The 1999–2000 Clemson Tigers women's basketball team represented Clemson University during the 1999–2000 NCAA Division I women's basketball season. The Tigers were led by thirteenth year head coach Jim Davis. The Tigers, members of the Atlantic Coast Conference, played their home games at Littlejohn Coliseum.

== Schedule ==
Date time, TV	Rank^{#}	Opponent^{#}	Result	Record	Site city, state
November 19, 1999*		Massachusetts	W 67–52	1–0	Littlejohn Coliseum; Clemson, South Carolina
November 22, 1999*		Ole Miss	W 71–63	2–0	Littlejohn Coliseum; Clemson, South Carolina
November 24, 1999*		vs. No. 14 Old Dominion; Coaches vs. Cancer Challenge	L 57–68	2–1	Hartford Civic Center; Hartford, Connecticut
November 26, 1999*		vs. Kentucky; Coaches vs. Cancer Challenge	W 70–65	3–1	Hartford Civic Center; Hartford, Connecticut
November 29, 1999*		South Carolina rivalry	W 65–46	4–1	Littlejohn Coliseum; Clemson, South Carolina
December 1, 1999*		at Furman	W 57–52	5–1	Timmons Arena; Greenville, South Carolina
December 4, 1999		at Georgia Tech	L 62–81	5–2 (0–1)	Alexander Memorial Coliseum; Atlanta, Georgia
December 11, 1999*		at Wofford	W 55–44	6–2 (0–1)	Benjamin Johnson Arena; Spartanburg, South Carolina
December 17, 1999*		Winthrop	W 64–41	7–2 (0–1)	Littlejohn Coliseum; Clemson, South Carolina
December 19, 1999*		vs. No. 9 Penn State	L 54–69	7–3 (0–1)	Myrtle Beach Convention Center; Myrtle Beach, South Carolina
December 21, 1999*		at UNC Greensboro	L 67–78 ^{OT}	7–4 (0–1)	Fleming Gymnasium; Greensboro, North Carolina
December 30, 1999*		at East Carolina	W 61–44	8–4 (0–1)	Williams Arena at Minges Coliseum; Greenville, North Carolina
January 2, 2000*		at UNC Asheville	W 75–56	9–4 (0–1)	Justice Center; Asheville, North Carolina
January 6, 2000		Maryland	L 58–74	9–5 (0–2)	Littlejohn Coliseum; Clemson, South Carolina
January 10, 2000		at No. 12 North Carolina	W 60–59	10–5 (1–2)	Carmichael Arena; Chapel Hill, North Carolina
January 13, 2000		No. 3 NC State	W 71–56	11–5 (2–2)	Littlejohn Coliseum; Clemson, South Carolina
January 16, 2000		at No. 1 Duke	L 51–60	11–6 (2–3)	Cameron Indoor Stadium; Durham, North Carolina
January 20, 2000		at Virginia	L 74–77 ^{OT}	11–7 (2–4)	University Hall; Charlottesville, Virginia
January 24, 2000		Wake Forest	W 66–55	12–7 (3–4)	Littlejohn Coliseum; Clemson, South Carolina
January 27, 2000		at Florida State	W 73–61	13–7 (4–4)	Tallahassee–Leon County Civic Center; Tallahassee, Florida
January 31, 2000		Georgia Tech	W 72–43	14–7 (5–4)	Littlejohn Coliseum; Clemson, South Carolina
February 6, 2000		at Maryland	W 59–57	15–7 (6–4)	Cole Field House; College Park, Maryland
February 10, 2000		North Carolina	W 69–65	16–7 (7–4)	Littlejohn Coliseum; Clemson, South Carolina
February 13, 2000		at No. 1 NC State	L 58–67	16–8 (7–5)	Reynolds Coliseum; Raleigh, North Carolina
February 17, 2000		No. 2 Virginia	L 63–72	16–9 (7–6)	Littlejohn Coliseum; Clemson, South Carolina
February 21, 2000		No. 9 Duke	L 44–59	16–10 (7–7)	Littlejohn Coliseum; Clemson, South Carolina
February 24, 2000		at Wake Forest	W 63–59	17–10 (8–7)	LJVM Coliseum; Winston-Salem, North Carolina
February 27, 2000		Florida State	W 75–58	18–10 (9–7)	Littlejohn Coliseum; Clemson, South Carolina
ACC Tournament
March 5, 2000*		vs. North Carolina; ACC Tournament quarterfinal	L 54–56	18–11 (9–7)	Greensboro Coliseum; Greensboro, North Carolina
NCAA Tournament
March 17, 2000*		vs. Drake; NCAA Tournament first round	W 64–50	19–11 (9–7)	Harry A. Gampel Pavilion; Storrs, Connecticut
March 19, 2000*		at No. 1 Connecticut; NCAA Tournament second round	L 45–83	19–12 (9–7)	Harry A. Gampel Pavilion; Storrs, Connecticut
*Non-conference game. ^{#}Rankings from AP Poll. (#) Tournament seedings in parentheses.
