= Paige Sauer =

American basketball player (born 1977)

Personal information
- Born: December 8, 1977 (age 48) Reno, Nevada, U.S.
- Listed height: 6 ft 5 in (1.96 m)
- Listed weight: 203 lb (92 kg)

Career information
- High school: Carl Albert (Midwest City, Oklahoma)
- College: UConn (1996–2000)
- WNBA draft: 2000: 2nd round, 31st overall pick
- Drafted by: Los Angeles Sparks
- Position: Center

Career history
- 2000: Los Angeles Sparks
- 2001–2002: Cleveland Rockers

Career highlights
- NCAA champion (2000); Third-team All-Big East
- Stats at Basketball Reference

Paige Maurine Sauer (born December 8, 1977) is an American former professional basketball player. Paige played professional basketball in the WNBA with the Los Angeles Sparks and the Cleveland Rockers. During her WNBA off seasons, Paige played professionally in Spain, Hungary, France and South Korea.

Sauer is graduate of the University of Connecticut, where in 2000 she earned a Bachelor of Arts degree in Psychology. While at UConn, Paige was captain of the UConn Huskies 2000 NCAA Women’s Basketball National Championship Team, and was also a member of two Elite Eight and one Sweet Sixteen Team NCAA tournament teams.

Paige Sauer joined Xebec in January 2021 and serves as a Vice President of Asset Management. Ms. Sauer is responsible for the overseeing property-level asset management for the portfolio of stabilized assets owned by Xebec and by Xebec Logistics Trust, LP, including stabilized properties held through its joint ventures.

== Early life ==
Paige spent her early years in Fallon, Nevada, with her twin brother and younger sister. Sauer attended Carl Albert High School in Midwest City, Oklahoma. She was class president and helped the school's team win a state championship.

== College career ==
Paige Sauer played for the University of Connecticut (UConn) Huskies from 1996 to 2001, where she was a key contributor to one of the most dominant eras in women's college basketball. As a 6'5" center, Sauer brought size, leadership, and a team-first mentality to a program known for its excellence under head coach Geno Auriemma.

During her five-year tenure, Sauer helped lead UConn to numerous milestones, including the 2000 NCAA National Championship, where she served as team captain. In total, she was a part of two Elite Eight appearances and one Sweet Sixteen, contributing consistently in the post and providing valuable depth on teams stacked with talent.

Sauer was instrumental in UConn’s dominance in the Big East Conference, helping secure four Big East Tournament titles and four regular season championships. Though not focused on individual accolades, she was known for her basketball IQ, consistency, and leadership both on and off the court.

Choosing UConn over other powerhouse programs, including Tennessee, Sauer cited the school’s winning culture and commitment to developing post players—highlighted by predecessors like Rebecca Lobo and Kara Wolters—as key reasons for her decision. She graduated with a degree in psychology, having left a lasting impact on the program as both a leader and teammate.

== WNBA career ==
Paige Sauer was selected by the Los Angeles Sparks as the 31st overall pick in the 2001 WNBA Draft. Joining a league that featured only 12 teams and a limited number of roster spots, Sauer considered it a tremendous honor to compete at the highest level of women’s professional basketball.

With the Sparks, she had the opportunity to play alongside and against some of the best players in the world. Though her role was primarily as a reserve center, her time in the WNBA provided valuable experience and insight into the elite standards of the professional game. Sauer later spent time with the Cleveland Rockers, extending her WNBA career over multiple seasons.

She described her WNBA experience as both humbling and inspiring, proud to be one of only approximately 140 players in the league at the time. Her years in the WNBA helped shape her perspective as a coach, giving her a firsthand understanding of the dedication and mindset required to compete at the professional level.

== International basketball ==
Following her time in the WNBA, Paige Sauer continued her professional basketball career overseas, gaining valuable experience in several international leagues. During the WNBA offseasons, she played in Spain, France, Hungary, and South Korea, competing at a high level while immersing herself in different basketball cultures.

Sauer embraced the opportunity to travel and broaden her perspective, both as an athlete and as a person. She credited her international playing experience with helping her grow professionally, allowing her to learn new styles of play and adapt to various team systems. In addition to the competitive environment, Sauer valued the chance to explore different countries, meet people from around the world, and experience life beyond the United States.

Her time abroad further deepened her understanding of the global game and contributed to the well-rounded basketball philosophy she would later bring into her coaching career.

== Career statistics ==
=== WNBA career statistics ===
Legend
GP	Games played	GS	Games started	MPG	Minutes per game	RPG	Rebounds per game
APG	Assists per game	SPG	Steals per game	BPG	Blocks per game	PPG	Points per game
TO	Turnovers per game	FG%	Field-goal percentage	3P%	3-point field-goal percentage	FT%	Free-throw percentage
**Bold**	Career best	°	League leader

==== Regular season ====
Year	Team	GP	GS	MPG	FG%	3P%	FT%	RPG	APG	SPG	BPG	TO	PPG
2005	Connecticut	15	0	5.7	36.8	30.8	0.0	0.4	0.5	0.1	0.0	**0.3**	1.2
2006	Connecticut	24	0	11.9	37.9	35.0	**100.0**	0.7	1.3	**0.3**	0.0	0.7	2.6
2007	Connecticut	33	0	12.7	36.6	**45.1**	75.0	0.9	0.9	0.1	0.0	0.5	3.4
2008	Connecticut	33	**3**	**15.1**	**42.3**	41.0	90.0	**1.2**	**1.4**	0.2	0.0	0.7	**4.2**
Career	4 years, 1 team	105	3	12.3	39.1	40.6	87.0	0.9	1.1	0.2	0.0	0.6	3.1

==== Playoffs ====
Year	Team	GP	GS	MPG	FG%	3P%	FT%	RPG	APG	SPG	BPG	TO	PPG
2005	Connecticut	6	0	11.8	22.2	16.7	0.0	0.3	1.2	0.2	0.0	0.7	0.8
2006	Connecticut	5	0	5.8	33.3	20.0	0.0	0.2	0.4	0.0	0.0	0.0	1.0
2007	Connecticut	3	0	15.7	28.6	33.3	66.7	0.7	3.0	0.3	0.0	0.3	2.7
2008	Connecticut	1	0	2.0	0.0	0.0	0.0	0.0	0.0	0.0	0.0	0.0	0.0
Career	4 years, 1 team	15	0	9.9	27.3	23.5	66.7	0.3	1.2	0.1	0.0	0.3	1.2

=== College ===
Year	Team	GP	GS	MPG	FG%	3P%	FT%	RPG	APG	SPG	BPG	TO	PPG
1996–97	Connecticut	34	-	-	52.3	14.3	66.7	4.2	0.4	0.2	0.7	-	6.1
1997–98	Connecticut	**36**	-	-	49.2	41.4	**73.0**	**6.0**	**1.1**	0.4	**1.5**	-	**11.9**
1998–99	Connecticut	30	-	-	**54.3**	9.1	52.0	3.5	0.6	**1.1**	0.4	-	6.0
1999–00	Connecticut	34	-	-	53.0	**50.0**	63.3	3.0	0.7	0.4	0.3	-	3.9
**Career**		134	-	-	51.4	33.9	66.8	4.2	0.7	0.5	0.7	-	7.1
Statistics retrieved from Sports-Reference.

== See also ==
- List of Connecticut Huskies in the WNBA draft
