= 1999–2000 Penn State Lady Lions basketball team =

Intercollegiate basketball season

1999–2000 Penn State Lady Lions basketball

Big Ten Regular Season Champions

NCAA tournament, Final Four
- Conference: Big Ten Conference

Ranking
- Coaches: No. 3
- AP: No. 6
- Record: 30–5 (15–1 Big Ten)
- Head coach: Rene Portland (20th season)
- Home arena: Bryce Jordan Center

1999–2000 Big Ten women's basketball standings
| | Conf. | | | | Overall |
| Team | W | | L | PCT | W | | L | PCT |
|---|---|---|---|---|---|---|---|---|
| No. 6 Penn State | 15 | – | 1 | .938 | 30 | – | 5 | .857 |
| Michigan | 13 | – | 3 | .813 | 22 | – | 8 | .733 |
| No. 13 Purdue † | 11 | – | 5 | .688 | 23 | – | 8 | .742 |
| Illinois | 11 | – | 5 | .688 | 23 | – | 11 | .676 |
| Wisconsin | 8 | – | 8 | .500 | 21 | – | 12 | .636 |
| Michigan State | 8 | – | 8 | .500 | 19 | – | 12 | .613 |
| Iowa | 6 | – | 10 | .375 | 9 | – | 18 | .333 |
| Ohio State | 5 | – | 11 | .313 | 13 | – | 15 | .464 |
| Indiana | 5 | – | 11 | .313 | 10 | – | 18 | .357 |
| Minnesota | 3 | – | 13 | .188 | 10 | – | 18 | .357 |
| Northwestern | 3 | – | 13 | .188 | 7 | – | 21 | .250 |
† 2000 Big Ten tournament winner Rankings from AP poll

The 1999–2000 Penn State Lady Lions basketball team represented Pennsylvania State University during the 1999–2000 NCAA Division I women's basketball season. The Lady Lions, led by 20th year head coach Rene Portland, played their home games at the Bryce Jordan Center and were members of the Big Ten Conference. They finished the season 30–5 overall, 15–1 in Big Ten play to win the Big Ten Regular Season title. They lost in the championship game to No. 3 seed Purdue in the 2000 Big Ten Conference women's basketball tournament. They were invited to the 2000 NCAA Division I women's basketball tournament where they reached the first Final Four in program history before losing in the National semifinals to eventual champion UConn.

== Roster ==
1999–2000 Penn State Nittany Lions women's basketball team
Players
Coaches

| Pos. | # | Name | Height | Year | Previous school | Hometown |
|---|---|---|---|---|---|---|
| G | 20 | Lisa Shepherd | 5 ft 11 in (1.8 m) | Jr |
| G | 30 | Helen Darling | 5 ft 7 in (1.7 m) | Sr | Brookhaven | Columbus, OH |
| F/C | 34 | Maren Walseth | 6 ft 3 in (1.91 m) | Jr |
| C | 40 | Andrea Garner | 6 ft 3 in (1.91 m) | Sr |

Head coach

Rene Portland

Assistant coach(es)

Legend

- (C) Team captain
- (S) Suspended
- (I) Ineligible
- (W) Walk-on
- Injured
- Current redshirt

Roster

== Schedule ==
| Date time, TV | Rank^{#} | Opponent^{#} | Result | Record | Site (attendance) city, state |
Regular Season
| Nov 20, 1999*; 7:30 p.m. | No. 10 | Villanova | W 76–54 | 1–0 | Bryce Jordan Center; University Park, PA |
| Nov 23, 1999*; 7:30 p.m. | No. 8 | at Maryland | W 91–60 | 2–0 | Cole Field House; College Park, MD |
| Nov 27, 1999* | No. 8 | vs. Saint Joseph's | W 96–64 | 3–0 | Cameron Indoor Stadium; Durham, NC |
| Nov 28, 1999* | No. 8 | at No. 25 Duke | L 49–63 | 3–1 | Cameron Indoor Stadium; Durham, NC |
| Dec 2, 1999* | No. 11 | Saint Francis (PA) | W 101–62 | 4–1 | Bryce Jordan Center; University Park, PA |
| Dec 5, 1999* | No. 11 | vs. No. 1 Connecticut; Honda Elite 4 Classic | L 74–87 | 4–2 | Disney's Wide World of Sports Complex (3,700); Bay Lake, FL |
| Dec 8, 1999* | | at La Salle | W 78–64 | 5–2 | |
| Dec 11, 1999* | | No. 6 Auburn | W 77–65 | 6–2 | Bryce Jordan Center; University Park, PA |
| Dec 19, 1999*; 1:30 p.m. | No. 9 | at Clemson | W 69–54 | 7–2 | Myrtle Beach Convention Center; Myrtle Beach, South Carolina |
| Dec 21, 1999*; 7:30 p.m. | | Pittsburgh | W 79–56 | 8–2 | Bryce Jordan Center; University Park, PA |
| Dec 30, 1999 | | Iowa | W 80–63 | 9–2 (1–0) | Bryce Jordan Center; University Park, PA |
| Jan 2, 2000; 2:00 p.m. | | Northwestern | W 114–49 | 10–2 (2–0) | Bryce Jordan Center; University Park, PA |
| Jan 6, 2000; 7:30 p.m. | | at Purdue | W 55–50 | 11–2 (3–0) | |
| Jan 8, 2000* | | Florida | W 91–67 | 12–2 | Bryce Jordan Center; University Park, PA |
| Jan 10, 2000 | | at Minnesota | W 82–30 | 13–2 (4–0) | |
| Jan 13, 2000; 7:30 p.m. | | No. 12 Illinois | W 76–66 | 14–2 (5–0) | Bryce Jordan Center; University Park, PA |
| Jan 16, 2000 | No. 4 | at Iowa | W 78–64 | 15–2 (6–0) | Carver–Hawkeye Arena; Iowa City, IA |
| Jan 20, 2000; 7:30 p.m. | No. 4 | Ohio State | W 73–62 | 16–2 (7–0) | Bryce Jordan Center; University Park, PA |
| Jan 23, 2000; 2:00 p.m. | No. 4 | at Michigan State | L 63–71 | 16–3 (7–1) | Breslin Center; East Lansing, MI |
| Jan 27, 2000 | No. 7 | Michigan | W 85–71 | 17–3 (8–1) | Bryce Jordan Center; University Park, PA |
| Jan 30, 2000 | No. 7 | Wisconsin | W 68–54 | 18–3 (9–1) | Bryce Jordan Center; University Park, PA |
| Feb 6, 2000 | No. 6 | at Wisconsin | W 57–52 | 19–3 (10–1) | Kohl Center; Madison, WI |
| Feb 13, 2000; 5:00 p.m. | No. 6 | Purdue | W 78–67 | 20–3 (11–1) | Bryce Jordan Center; University Park, PA |
| Feb 17, 2000 | No. 6 | at Indiana | W 74–36 | 21–3 (12–1) | Assembly Hall; Bloomington, IN |
| Feb 20, 2000; 3:00 p.m. | No. 6 | at Northwestern | W 66–34 | 22–3 (13–1) | Welsh–Ryan Arena; Evanston, IL |
| Feb 24, 2000 | No. 6 | Minnesota | W 92–43 | 23–3 (14–1) | Bryce Jordan Center; University Park, PA |
| Feb 27, 2000 | No. 5 | at Ohio State | W 56–50 | 24–3 (15–1) | Value City Arena; Columbus, OH |
Big Ten tournament
| Mar 3, 2000* | (1) No. 5 | vs. (8) Ohio State; Quarterfinals | W 64–48 | 25–3 | Conseco Fieldhouse; Indianapolis, IN |
| Mar 4, 2000* | (1) No. 5 | vs. (4) Illinois; Semifinals | W 81–74 | 26–3 | Conseco Fieldhouse; Indianapolis, IN |
| Mar 5, 2000* | (1) No. 5 | vs. (3) No. 20 Purdue; Championship game | L 63–71 | 26–4 | Conseco Fieldhouse; Indianapolis, IN |
NCAA tournament
| Mar 17, 2000* | (2 MW) No. 6 | (15 MW) Youngstown State; First round | W 83–63 | 27–4 | Bryce Jordan Center; University Park, PA |
| Mar 19, 2000* | (2 MW) No. 6 | (7 MW) Auburn; Second round | W 75–69 | 28–4 | Bryce Jordan Center; University Park, PA |
| Mar 26, 2000* | (2 MW) No. 6 | vs. (3 MW) No. 7 Iowa State; Regional Semifinal – Sweet Sixteen | W 66–65 | 29–4 | Kemper Arena; Kansas City, MO |
| Mar 27, 2000* | (2 MW) No. 6 | vs. (1 MW) No. 3 Louisiana Tech; Regional Final – Elite Eight | W 86–65 | 30–4 | Kemper Arena; Kansas City, MO |
| Mar 31, 2000* | (2 MW) No. 6 | vs. (1 E) No. 1 Connecticut; National Semifinal – Final Four | L 67–89 | 30–5 | First Union Center (20,060); Philadelphia, PA |
*Non-conference game. ^{#}Rankings from AP Poll. (#) Tournament seedings in parentheses. MW=Midwest. All times are in Eastern Time.

== See also ==
1999–2000 Penn State Nittany Lions basketball team
