= 1999–2000 Iowa State Cyclones women's basketball team =

Intercollegiate basketball season

1999–2000 Iowa State Cyclones women's basketball

Big 12 Regular Season Champion Big 12 Conference tournament Champion

NCAA Tournament, Sweet Sixteen
- Conference: Big 12 Conference
- Record: 27–6 (13–3 Big 12)
- Head coach: Bill Fennelly (5th season)
- Assistant coaches: Katie Abrahamson; Latoja Harris; Kelly Kebe
- Home arena: Hilton Coliseum

1999–2000 Big 12 Conference women's basketball standings
	Conf.				Overall
Team	W		L	PCT	W		L	PCT
No. 7 Iowa State †	13	–	3	.813	27	–	6	.818
No. 11 Texas Tech	13	–	3	.813	28	–	5	.848
No. 18 Oklahoma	13	–	3	.813	25	–	8	.758
Kansas	11	–	5	.688	20	–	10	.667
Nebraska	10	–	6	.625	18	–	13	.581
Texas	9	–	7	.563	21	–	13	.618
Missouri	7	–	9	.438	18	–	12	.600
Kansas State	6	–	10	.375	13	–	17	.433
Oklahoma State	5	–	11	.313	14	–	16	.467
Colorado	4	–	12	.250	10	–	19	.345
Texas A&M	3	–	13	.188	11	–	16	.407
Baylor	2	–	14	.125	7	–	20	.259
† 2000 Big 12 Tournament winner Rankings from AP poll

The 1999–2000 Iowa State Cyclones women's basketball team represented Iowa State University in the 1999–2000 NCAA Division I women's basketball season. This was head coach Bill Fennelly's 5th season at Iowa State. The Cyclones were members of the Big 12 Conference and played their home games at the Hilton Coliseum. They finished the season 27–6, 13–3 in Big 12 play to finish tied for first place. They were the champions of the Big 12 women's tournament defeating Texas by 10 points in the finals.
