= Stacy Hansmeyer =

American basketball player and coach

Personal information
- Born: May 6, 1978 (age 48) Norman, Oklahoma, U.S.
- Listed height: 5 ft 11 in (1.80 m)
- Listed weight: 150 lb (68 kg)

Career information
- High school: Norman High School (Norman, Oklahoma)
- College: Connecticut (1996–2000)
- Position: Forward
- Number: 20

Career highlights
- NCAA champion (2000)
Medals
Women's basketball
Representing the United States
FIBA Under-18 Americas Championship
| Silver medal – second place | 1996 Mexico | Team |

Stacy Camille Hansmeyer (born May 6, 1978) is a former NCAA Basketball player and a part of Connecticut's 2000 NCAA title as a senior and Oklahoma's 2002 and 2009 NCAA Final Four appearances as a coach. She was also an assistant coach for the Oklahoma women's basketball program.

== Early years ==
Hansmeyer ran track in elementary school, and won or came in second in all-city track meets. At the age of ten, she entered a statewide event, Hershey's Track and Field Games, and finished first. Her time was good enough to qualify for the nation event, held in Hershey, Pennsylvania. She took her first plane ride to the event, and finished third in the 50-yard event. That result helped her to see herself differently, as an athlete.

== Playing career ==
=== High school ===
Stacy played on the varsity team in her freshman year at Norman High School, under coach Sherri Coale. That year (1993), the Tigers won the State Championship. In her senior year Hansmeyer led Norman High to the state 6A title with a 27–1 record, contributing 17.0 points and 9.0 rebounds per game her final prep season. The team won the Championship game by 40 points. Hansmeyer was a part of two NHS state championship teams (1993, 1996), four teams that participated in the state tournament and four 23-plus win seasons. She also help produced a four- year record of 101–10 (.910 winning percentage). In February 2002, Hansmeyer and Coale were inducted into the Norman High School Hall of Fame together. As Stacy was finishing her senior year of high school, Coale was offered the head coaching job at the University of Oklahoma.

Following her senior season, Hansmeyer gained international playing experience when she earned a spot on the 1996 Junior National team (now known as the U18 and U19 teams).

=== University of Connecticut ===
The college choices came down to UConn, Louisiana Tech, and Southwest Missouri State, who have all previously been to a Final Four. The UConn team was coming off a national championship, which was considered one of the greatest National Championships in history in 1995 when they went undefeated. Coach Coale helped Stacy make the decision to attend UConn. Stacy earned four letters as a player at the University of Connecticut. The Huskies had an overall record of 132–10 (.930 winning percentage). They appeared in the NCAA Tournament each year, advanced to the Elite Eight twice (1996–97, 1997–98) and Final Four (1999–2000) and Sweet 16 (1998–99) once. She finished her playing career ranked ninth in career field goal percentage (.545) and tied for eighth for most career games played (134). In her senior year, her team played the Tennessee Lady Volunteers in the national championship game. The Huskies won by about 20 points capturing their second national championship. Stacy graduated from UConn with a bachelor's degree in Communications. She was beloved by the fans at UConn fans who lovingly dubbed her Bam Bam.

== USA Basketball ==
Hansmeyer was named to the USA Basketball Women's Junior National Team (now called the U18 team). The team participated in the third Junior World Championship, held in Chetumal, Mexico in late August and early September 1996. The USA team won their early games easily, but lost by four points to the team from Brazil, ending up with the silver medal for the event.

== Coaching career ==
After graduating from UConn, Stacy worked as an assistant coach at her alma mater before reuniting with her old high school coach Sherri Coale at Oklahoma in 2001. Since joining the Sooners staff the Sooners have been invited to the NCAA Tournament every season. In 2002, the Sooners advanced to the title game in the 2002 NCAA Women's Division I Basketball Tournament to play her alma mater. The Sooners lost to UConn 82–70 in Hansmeyer's reunion with Connecticut. She stepped down from her position after the 2011 season.

== Trivia ==
Stacy comes from a musical family. On her senior night Stacy sang the National Anthem before the sold out crowd. She has also sung the National Anthem once at the Sooners game.

== University of Connecticut Statistics ==
Stacy Hansmeyer Statistics at University of Connecticut
| Year | G | FG | FGA | PCT | 3FG | 3FGA | PCT | FT | FTA | PCT | REB | AVG | A | TO | B | S | MIN | PTS | AVG |
| 1996–97 | 33 | 37 | 66 | 0.561 | 0 | 1 | 0.000 | 20 | 43 | 0.465 | 79 | 2.4 | 7 | 24 | 2 | 7 | 292 | 94 | 2.8 |
| 1997–98 | 36 | 124 | 213 | 0.582 | 0 | 0 | 0.000 | 57 | 95 | 0.600 | 188 | 5.2 | 44 | 73 | 3 | 37 | 773 | 305 | 8.5 |
| 1998–99 | 33 | 55 | 115 | 0.478 | 4 | 15 | 0.267 | 32 | 48 | 0.667 | 79 | 2.4 | 27 | 29 | 1 | 14 | 366 | 146 | 4.4 |
| 1999-00 | 32 | 45 | 85 | 0.529 | 12 | 29 | 0.414 | 20 | 36 | 0.556 | 80 | 2.5 | 28 | 35 | 2 | 21 | 340 | 122 | 3.8 |
| Totals | 134 | 261 | 479 | 0.545 | 16 | 45 | 0.355 | 129 | 222 | 0.581 | 426 | 3.2 | 106 | 161 | 8 | 79 | 1771 | 667 | 5.0 |

== Awards and honors ==
- In her senior year at Norman High School, she earned USA Today honorable mention All-America and Parade magazine third team All-America accolades.
- She was named to the 1997–98 Preseason WNIT All-Tournament team.
- In the summer of 1999, she led the Big East/Nike All-Star team with 14.2 points and 7.8 rebounds.
- In February 2002, she was inducted into the Norman High School Hall of Fame.
