= 1999–2000 NCAA Division I women's basketball rankings =

1999–00 NCAA Division I women's basketball rankings
- Season: 1999–00
- NCAA Tournament: 2000
- Preseason No. 1: Connecticut
- NCAA Tournament Champions: Connecticut
NCAA Division I women's basketball rankings


Two human polls comprise the 1999–00 NCAA Division I women's basketball rankings, the AP Poll and the Coaches Poll, in addition to various publications' preseason polls. The AP poll is currently a poll of sportswriters, while the USA Today Coaches' Poll is a poll of college coaches. The AP conducts polls weekly through the end of the regular season and conference play, while the Coaches poll conducts a final, post-NCAA tournament poll as well.

== Legend ==
–	No votes
(#)	Ranking

== AP Poll ==
Team	9-Nov	15-Nov	22-Nov	29-Nov	6-Dec	13-Dec	20-Dec	27-Dec	3-Jan	10-Jan	17-Jan	24-Jan	31-Jan	7-Feb	14-Feb	21-Feb	28-Feb	13-Mar
UConn	1	1	1	1	1	1	1	1	1	1	1	1	1	1	1	1	1	1
Tennessee	2	5	5	3	2	2	2	2	2	2	2	4	4	2	2	2	T2	2
Louisiana Tech	6	2	2	4	3	3	3	3	4	4	3	2	2	4	4	4	4	3
Georgia	3	3	3	2	5	5	5	5	7	7	7	3	3	3	3	3	T2	4
Notre Dame	8	7	6	11	7	11	12	10	8	6	5	5	5	5	5	5	6	5
Penn St.	10	11	9	14	16	9	9	8	6	5	4	7	6	6	6	6	5	6
Iowa St.	7	6	13	12	9	14	16	14	10	8	8	6	8	8	10	13	11	7
Rutgers	4	10	8	7	13	16	15	12	11	9	11	13	10	10	8	8	8	8
UC Santa Barbara	14	15	12	15	23	23	22	23	22	19	17	15	T13	12	11	10	9	9
Duke	21	22	–	22	20	18	17	15	14	11	9	9	12	14	14	9	T12	10
Texas Tech	22	23	17	16	12	7	7	6	13	16	15	14	9	9	12	7	7	11
Mississippi St.	–	–	–	–	25	22	21	21	20	24	22	20	20	21	22	20	17	12
Purdue	23	21	20	17	18	12	11	13	12	18	19	17	17	15	17	21	18	13
Old Dominion	15	16	14	19	21	21	20	18	21	22	18	16	16	18	16	15	14	14
LSU	13	14	22	23	15	13	13	11	16	17	14	12	7	7	9	12	10	15
Auburn	11	12	11	8	6	8	8	7	5	10	10	11	T13	13	13	11	T12	16
Boston College	19	20	18	24	–	–	–	–	T25	25	20	19	18	19	19	17	19	17
Oklahoma	–	–	–	–	–	–	–	–	–	–	25	23	22	17	18	24	21	18
Virginia	–	–	–	–	–	–	–	–	–	–	–	25	24	22	21	16	16	19
Oregon	16	17	16	13	10	15	19	22	24	23	–	–	–	–	–	–	–	20
Arizona	25	25	24	21	19	17	14	19	18	20	16	18	19	16	15	23	20	21
Tulane	–	–	–	–	–	24	24	24	19	13	21	22	21	25	20	18	23	22
North Carolina St.	20	9	7	6	4	4	4	4	3	3	6	8	11	11	7	14	15	23
Xavier	–	–	–	–	–	–	–	–	–	–	–	–	–	–	–	–	–	24
Michigan	–	–	–	–	–	–	–	–	–	–	–	–	–	–	–	–	22	25
Arkansas St.	–	–	–	–	–	–	–	–	T25	–	–	–	–	–	–	–	–	–
George Washington	–	–	–	–	–	–	–	–	–	–	24	–	–	–	25	–	–	–
Illinois	12	13	15	10	17	19	18	17	15	12	13	21	23	–	–	–	–	–
Kansas	18	19	19	18	14	20	23	20	23	21	23	–	25	23	–	25	–	–
Marquette	–	–	–	–	–	–	–	–	–	–	–	–	–	–	23	19	24	–
Nebraska	24	24	–	–	–	–	–	–	–	–	–	–	–	–	–	–	–	–
North Carolina	9	8	10	9	11	10	10	9	9	15	–	–	–	–	–	–	–	–
Stanford	–	–	23	20	22	–	–	–	–	–	–	24	–	24	–	–	25	–
Texas	–	–	–	–	–	25	25	25	–	–	–	–	–	–	–	–	–	–
UCLA	5	4	4	5	8	6	6	16	17	14	12	10	15	20	24	22	–	–
Virginia Tech	17	18	21	T25	24	–	–	–	–	–	–	–	–	–	–	–	–	–
Wisconsin	–	–	25	T25	–	–	–	–	–	–	–	–	–	–	–	–	–	–

== USA Today Coaches poll ==
Team	PS	23-Nov	30-Nov	7-Dec	14-Dec	21-Dec	28-Dec	4-Jan	11-Jan	18-Jan	25-Jan	1-Feb	8-Feb	15-Feb	22-Feb	Feb-29	7-Mar	14-Mar	3-Apr
UConn	1	1	1	1	1	1	1	1	1	1	1	1	1	1	1	1	1	1	1
Tennessee	2	5	3	2	2	2	2	2	2	2	4	4	3	3	3	3	2	2	2
Penn St.	10	8	11	12	6	6	6	5	5	4	7	6	6	6	6	5	6	5	3
Rutgers	3	7	7	13	17	16	14	14	11	13	12	12	11	11	T11	11	10	8	4
Georgia	5	3	2	5	5	5	6	7	7	7	3	2	2	2	2	2	4	4	5
Louisiana Tech	6	2	4	3	3	3	3	4	4	3	2	3	4	4	4	4	3	3	6
Texas Tech	23	17	16	T10	T8	7	7	13	14	11	10	7	7	8	7	7	7	11	7
LSU	14	24	25	22	21	17	16	21	19	15	13	11	10	T9	9	8	12	12	8
Notre Dame	9	6	8	6	7	8	8	6	6	6	5	5	5	5	5	6	5	6	9
Iowa St.	7	13	14	T10	13	13	13	11	9	9	6	9	9	T9	13	12	11	10	10
Duke	22	25	19	18	15	15	11	10	8	8	9	10	12	12	8	10	9	7	11
Old Dominion	15	16	20	21	19	19	19	19	21	18	17	16	16	16	15	13	13	13	12
Oklahoma	–	–	–	–	–	–	–	–	–	–	–	25	22	20	25	22	21	22	13
Virginia	25	–	–	–	–	–	–	–	–	–	24	23	21	22	16	17	19	19	14
Mississippi St.	–	–	–	–	23	23	23	18	22	21	21	19	17	18	T17	19	14	14	15
Purdue	19	19	17	16	12	12	12	12	16	19	19	20	19	17	21	20	15	15	16
Boston College	21	18	22	25	24	25	25	25	25	22	22	18	18	19	T17	18	16	17	17
North Carolina	8	11	12	14	11	11	10	9	12	23	–	–	–	–	–	–	–	–	18
Auburn	11	12	10	7	10	10	9	8	10	10	11	13	15	15	14	15	17	18	19
Arizona	24	23	23	19	16	14	15	15	18	14	15	15	14	14	19	16	20	20	20
UC Santa Barbara	13	10	9	17	22	21	22	22	20	17	16	14	13	13	10	9	8	9	21
UAB	–	–	–	–	–	–	–	–	–	–	–	–	–	–	–	–	–	–	22
North Carolina St.	18	9	6	4	4	4	4	3	3	5	8	8	8	7	T11	14	18	16	23
Tulane	–	–	–	–	T25	24	24	20	15	20	20	22	24	21	20	21	22	21	24
Vanderbilt	–	–	–	–	–	–	–	–	–	–	–	–	–	–	–	–	–	–	25
George Washington	–	–	–	–	–	–	–	–	–	–	–	–	–	–	–	25	23	23	–
Illinois	12	15	13	20	20	20	20	16	13	12	18	21	25	–	–	–	–	–	–
Kansas	20	21	18	15	18	22	21	23	23	24	23	24	23	24	24	–	25	–	–
Marquette	–	–	–	–	–	–	–	–	–	–	–	–	–	25	23	24	–	–	–
Michigan	–	–	–	–	–	–	–	–	–	–	–	–	–	–	–	23	24	24	–
Oregon	16	14	15	9	14	18	18	24	24	–	–	–	–	–	–	–	–	25	–
Stanford	–	22	21	23	–	–	–	–	–	25	25	–	–	–	–	–	–	–	–
UCLA	4	4	5	8	T8	9	17	17	17	16	14	17	20	23	22	–	–	–	–
Virginia Tech	17	20	24	24	T25	–	–	–	–	–	–	–	–	–	–	–	–	–	–
