= 1999–2000 Tennessee Lady Volunteers basketball team =

Intercollegiate basketball season

1999–2000 Tennessee Lady Volunteers basketball

SEC tournament champions SEC regular season champions

NCAA tournament, Runner-up
- Conference: Southeastern Conference

Ranking
- Coaches: No. 2
- AP: No. 2
- Record: 33–4 (13–1 SEC)
- Head coach: Pat Summitt (26th season)
- Assistant coaches: Mickie DeMoss; Holly Warlick
- Home arena: Thompson-Boling Arena

The 1999–2000 Tennessee Lady Volunteers basketball team represented the University of Tennessee as a member of the Southeastern Conference during the 1999–2000 women's college basketball season. Coached by Pat Summitt, the Lady Volunteers finished 33–4 (13–1 SEC). Riding a 20-game winning steak entering the National Championship game, that included a win over No. 1 UConn, they ended the season runner-up after losing to the Huskies, 71–52.

== Roster ==
1999–2000 Tennessee Lady Volunteers women's basketball team
Players
Coaches

Pos.	#	Name	Height	Year	Previous school	Hometown
C	00	Michelle Snow	6 ft 5 in (1.96 m)	So		Pensacola, Florida
F	3	Niya Butts	6 ft 0 in (1.83 m)	Sr		Americus, Georgia
G/F	5	Kyra Elzy	6 ft 1 in (1.85 m)	Sr		LaGrange, Kentucky
F	13	Gwen Jackson	6 ft 2 in (1.88 m)	Fr
G/F	20	Kara Lawson	5 ft 9 in (1.75 m)	Fr		Alexandria, Virginia
G	21	Semeka Randall	5 ft 10 in (1.78 m)	Jr		Cleveland, Ohio
F	24	Tamika Catchings	6 ft 1 in (1.85 m)	Jr		Duncanville, Texas

Head coach

- Pat Summitt

Assistant coach(es)

- Mickie DeMoss
- Holly Warlick

Legend

- (C) Team captain
- (S) Suspended
- (I) Ineligible
- (W) Walk-on
- Injured
- Current redshirt

Roster

== Schedule and results ==
Date time, TV	Rank^{#}	Opponent^{#}	Result	Record	Site city, state
Regular season
Nov 14, 1999*	No. 2	No. 6 Louisiana Tech	L 64–69	0–1	Thompson–Boling Arena; Knoxville, TN
Nov 19, 1999*	No. 2	Tennessee–Martin	W 133–60	1–1	Thompson–Boling Arena; Knoxville, TN
Nov 26, 1999*	No. 5	at No. 23 Stanford	W 79–73	2–1	Maples Pavilion; Palo Alto, CA
Nov 28, 1999*	No. 5	at No. 4 UCLA	W 88–77	3–1	Pauley Pavilion; Los Angeles, CA
Dec 2, 1999*	No. 3	No. 17 Purdue	W 72–66	4–1	Thompson–Boling Arena; Knoxville, TN
Dec 5, 1999*	No. 3	at No. 25 Wisconsin	W 85–62	5–1	Kohl Center; Madison, WI
Dec 7, 1999*	No. 2	at Memphis	W 92–69	6–1	Memorial Fieldhouse; Memphis, TN
Dec 17, 1999*	No. 2	at DePaul	W 100–66	7–1	Alumni Hall; Chicago, IL
Dec 19, 1999*	No. 2	at Saint Joseph's	W 82–59	8–1	Alumni Memorial Fieldhouse; Philadelphia, PA
Dec 30, 1999*	No. 2	No. 25 Texas	W 106–76	9–1	Thompson–Boling Arena; Knoxville, TN
Jan 3, 2000*	No. 2	No. 21 Old Dominion	W 113–55	10–1	Thompson–Boling Arena; Knoxville, TN
Jan 6, 2000	No. 2	at No. 16 LSU	W 86–50	11–1 (1–0)	Maravich Assembly Center; Baton Rouge, LA
Jan 8, 2000*	No. 2	No. 1 Connecticut; Rivalry	L 66–74	11–2	Thompson–Boling Arena (23,385); Knoxville, TN
Jan 10, 2000	No. 2	Arkansas	W 79–69	12–2 (2–0)	Thompson–Boling Arena; Knoxville, TN
Jan 14, 2000	No. 2	at South Carolina	W 92–76	13–2 (3–0)	Carolina Coliseum; Columbia, SC
Jan 17, 2000*	No. 2	at No. 7 Georgia	L 51–78	13–3 (3–1)	Stegeman Coliseum; Athens, GA
Jan 23, 2000	No. 2	at Kentucky	W 71–65	14–3 (4–1)	Rupp Arena; Lexington, KY
Jan 29, 2000*	No. 4	vs. No. 8 NC State	W 83–63	15–3	Gund Arena; Cleveland, OH
Jan 30, 2000	No. 4	Kentucky	W 77–48	16–3 (5–1)	Thompson–Boling Arena; Knoxville, TN
Feb 2, 2000*	No. 4	at No. 1 Connecticut; Rivalry	W 72–71	17–3	Harry A. Gampel Pavilion (10,027); Storrs, CT
Feb 4, 2000	No. 4	Vanderbilt	W 78–52	18–3 (6–1)	Thompson–Boling Arena; Knoxville, TN
Feb 6, 2000	No. 4	Alabama	W 65–47	19–3 (7–1)	Thompson–Boling Arena; Knoxville, TN
Feb 10, 2000	No. 3	at Ole Miss	W 70–49	20–3 (8–1)	Tad Smith Coliseum; Oxford, MS
Feb 13, 2000	No. 3	Florida	W 97–78	21–3 (9–1)	Thompson–Boling Arena; Knoxville, TN
Feb 17, 2000	No. 3	at No. 22 Mississippi State	W 79–75	22–3 (10–1)	Humphrey Coliseum; Starkville, MS
Feb 20, 2000	No. 3	No. 9 LSU	W 80–48	23–3 (11–1)	Thompson–Boling Arena; Knoxville, TN
Feb 24, 2000	No. 2	at Vanderbilt	W 59–57	24–3 (12–1)	Memorial Gymnasium; Nashville, TN
Feb 27, 2000*	No. 2	No. 11 Auburn	W 76–61	25–3 (13–1)	Thompson–Boling Arena; Knoxville, TN
SEC tournament
Mar 3, 2000*	No. 2	vs. Florida; Quarterfinals	W 91–79	26–3	McKenzie Arena; Chattanooga, TN
Mar 4, 2000*	No. 2	vs. Vanderbilt; Semifinals	W 61–53	27–3	McKenzie Arena; Chattanooga, TN
Mar 5, 2000*	No. 2	vs. No. 17 Mississippi State; Championship game	W 70–67	28–3	McKenzie Arena; Chattanooga, TN
NCAA tournament
Mar 17, 2000*	(1 ME) No. 2	vs. (16 ME) Furman; First round	W 90–38	29–3	Thompson–Boling Arena; Knoxville, TN
Mar 19, 2000*	(1 ME) No. 2	vs. (8 ME) No. 20 Arizona; Second round	W 75–60	30–3	Thompson–Boling Arena; Knoxville, TN
Mar 25, 2000*	(1 ME) No. 2	vs. (4 ME) No. 14 Virginia; Regional Semifinal – Sweet Sixteen	W 77–56	31–3	Pyramid Arena; Memphis, TN
Mar 27, 2000*	(1 ME) No. 2	vs. (3 ME) No. 10 Texas Tech; Regional Final – Elite Eight	W 57–44	32–3	Pyramid Arena; Memphis, TN
Mar 31, 2000*	(1 ME) No. 2	vs. (2 W) No. 7 Rutgers; National Semifinal – Final Four	W 64–54	33–3	First Union Center (20,060); Philadelphia, PA
Apr 2, 2000*	(1 ME) No. 2	vs. (1 E) No. 1 Connecticut; National Championship/Rivalry	L 52–71	33–4	First Union Center (20,060); Philadelphia, PA
*Non-conference game. ^{#}Rankings from AP Poll. (#) Tournament seedings in parentheses. ME=Mideast.

== Rankings ==
Ranking movements Legend: ██ Increase in ranking ██ Decrease in ranking
	Week																		
Poll	Pre	1	2	3	4	5	6	7	8	9	10	11	12	13	14	15	16	17	Final
AP	2	5	3	2	2	2	2	2	2	2	4	4	3	3	3	3	2	2	2
Coaches	2	5	3	2	2	2	2	2	2	2	4	4	2	2	2	2	2	2	2

== Awards and honors ==
- Tamika Catchings – Naismith Player of the Year
