= Tennessee–UConn women's basketball rivalry =

American college basketball rivalry

- UConn Huskies Tennessee Lady Volunteers
- Sport: Women's basketball
- First meeting: January 16, 1995; Connecticut 77, Tennessee 66
- Latest meeting: February 1, 2026; Connecticut 96, Tennessee 66
- Next meeting: December 12, 2026; Hartford, Connecticut

Statistics
- Total meetings: 28
- All-time series: Connecticut leads, 18–10
- Largest victory: Connecticut, 96–66 (2026)
- Longest win streak: Connecticut, 6 (2002–2004)
- Current win streak: Connecticut, 1 (2026–present)

Locations of Tennessee and UConn

The women's basketball rivalry between the Lady Volunteers of the University of Tennessee and the UConn Huskies of the University of Connecticut is a notable rivalry in college basketball. The matchup features two long-tenured and media savvy coaches generally acknowledged among the top five ever in their sport, over two dozen players who went on to play in the WNBA, and two programs that have combined for 20 national championships. Their head-to-head matchups were consistently the top-rated games in the college women's field.

Until the 2006–07 season, the two programs met annually in winter at one or both of the schools, but the rivalry is unique for having a third of its games occurring in the women's NCAA tournament. Four times, the national championship has been on the line.

The schools started playing each other in 1995. UConn leads the series 16–9, including 5–2 in the tournament and 4–0 for the title. On the day of every meeting during the rivalry series, both schools have ranked in the top 25 of the Associated Press rankings, until 2023 when Tennessee was not ranked for the first time in the series.

In AP Poll history, Tennessee and UConn have the two longest appearance streaks in women's college basketball. Tennessee had a 565-week run spanning 32 years and UConn currently has a more than 500-week run covering almost 30 years. In addition, UConn has the most No. 1 appearances with 246 with Tennessee in second at 112.

The two schools halted the regular-season series after the 2006–07 season, and didn't play again for 13 years. The next season, both teams made the 2008 Final Four, but Stanford defeated UConn in the semifinals. Tennessee won the championship.

In 2018, a home and home series was announced with the next meeting at UConn on January 23, 2020. Thirteen years after the series halted, UConn beat Tennessee in the rivalry rematch, 60–45.

== Accomplishments by the two rivals ==
The following summarizes the accomplishments of the two programs.

Team	UConn	Tennessee
National titles	12	8
Final Four appearances	24	18
NCAA Tournament appearances	34	41
Weeks in AP Top–25	592	771
All-time program record	1304-324	1471-385
All-time winning percentage	.801	.793

== The coaches ==
In its heyday, the rivalry was notable among team sports in that it almost focused on the sidelines rather than the floor. The two coaches were highly paid and both landing in the Basketball Hall of Fame and Women's Basketball Hall of Fame. Between them, they account for over 2,000 wins.

On the Tennessee side was Pat Summitt, the all-time winningest NCAA Division I college basketball coach, male or female. Summitt won eight NCAA women's tournaments. She was the acknowledged dean of women's college basketball in the modern era. She was the Naismith College Coach of the Year six times.

On the UConn side is Geno Auriemma, who has won eleven of the last twenty-four NCAA women's tournaments, four at the expense of Summitt in the finals. Auriemma’s accomplishments included an 111-game winning streak from the fall of 2014 to the Final Four of 2017 NCAA women's tournament. He has seven Naismith awards to Summitt's six.

The two poured gasoline on the fire in press conferences, with Auriemma at one point calling Tennessee the "Evil Empire". The two apparently mended fences after some sparring, as Auriemma noted in his autobiography, Geno.

== The games ==
The two schools first met on January 16, 1995, when televised women's basketball was a rarity. At this high point, with dominant players such as Rebecca Lobo, Kara Wolters and Jennifer Rizzotti, UConn's program was on the rise, beating Tennessee during the regular season and again for the title and an undefeated regular season. They would win another rivalry game in 1996.

The next three years belonged to Summitt, as the Lady Vols won four of the next five meetings with the Huskies en route to three straight national championships. The "Meeks"—Chamique Holdsclaw, Semeka Randall, and Tamika Catchings—and point guard Michelle M. Marciniak powered Tennessee past all rivals, including UConn.

On the horizon, though, were Auriemma's most dominant classes yet, and possibly the strongest lineup ever in the women's game. The starting five of Sue Bird, Asjha Jones, Swin Cash, Tamika Williams, and (for the latter part of the run) Diana Taurasi gave UConn four of the next five national championships. In that run of 2000 to 2004, UConn crushed Tennessee in the rivalry, winning nine of the next eleven meetings, including the 2000, 2003, and 2004 championship games.

In the three seasons after Taurasi went to the WNBA, Summitt rebounded with strong new players like Candace Parker, and won each meeting. UConn's program lacked a dominant scorer like Taurasi, and Tennessee made the most of this vulnerability.

With these results, the rivalry continues to be top-of-mind in the women's game, even years after its discontinuation. A matchup in the 2002 Final Four at the Alamodome in San Antonio was in front of the largest crowd in women's history (29,619). The 2006 regular-season game at Thompson–Boling Arena in Knoxville drew the largest crowd ever for a regular-season women's game (24,653).

After the 2007 game, Auriemma noted that the rivalry, while still intense, lost some of its edge because of increasing parity in the women's game. As an illustration, 2006 was the first time since 1999 that neither UConn nor Tennessee had made the Final Four. He remarked, "In some sense, a small sense, it's still the Red Sox and the Yankees. It still is. But there's still a lot more good things going on in college basketball now. That's just the reality of it."

Thirteen years after the series ended, the rivalry resumed in 2020, with UConn winning all 4 games through the 2023 season.

== Results ==
Connecticut victories	Tennessee victories

No.	Date	Location	Winning team		Losing team	
1	January 16, 1995	Storrs, CT	#2 Connecticut	77	#1 Tennessee	66
2	April 2, 1995	Minneapolis, MN	#1 Connecticut	70	#3 Tennessee	64
3	January 6, 1996	Knoxville, TN	#2 Connecticut	59	#4 Tennessee	53
4	March 29, 1996	Charlotte, NC	#4 Tennessee	88	#2 Connecticut	83^{OT}
5	January 5, 1997	Hartford, CT	#1 Connecticut	72	#8 Tennessee	57
6	March 24, 1997	Iowa City, IA	#10 Tennessee	91	#1 Connecticut	81
7	January 3, 1998	Knoxville, TN	#1 Tennessee	84	#3 Connecticut	69
8	January 10, 1999	Storrs, CT	#2 Tennessee	92	#1 Connecticut	81
9	January 8, 2000	Knoxville, TN	#1 Connecticut	74	#2 Tennessee	67
10	February 2, 2000	Storrs, CT	#4 Tennessee	72	#1 Connecticut	71
11	April 2, 2000	Philadelphia, PA	#1 Connecticut	71	#2 Tennessee	52
12	December 30, 2000	Hartford, CT	#1 Connecticut	81	#2 Tennessee	76
13	February 1, 2001	Knoxville, TN	#3 Tennessee	92	#2 Connecticut	88
14	January 5, 2002	Knoxville, TN	#1 Connecticut	86	#2 Tennessee	72
15	March 29, 2002	San Antonio, TX	#1 Connecticut	79	#6 Tennessee	56

No.	Date	Location	Winning team		Losing team	
16	January 4, 2003	Hartford, CT	#3 Connecticut	63	#5 Tennessee	62^{OT}
17	April 8, 2003	Atlanta, GA	#1 Connecticut	73	#4 Tennessee	68
18	February 5, 2004	Knoxville, TN	#4 Connecticut	81	#1 Tennessee	67
19	April 6, 2004	New Orleans, LA	#6 Connecticut	70	#2 Tennessee	61
20	January 8, 2005	Hartford, CT	#10 Tennessee	68	#15 Connecticut	67
21	January 7, 2006	Knoxville, TN	#1 Tennessee	89	#7 Connecticut	80
22	January 6, 2007	Hartford, CT	#4 Tennessee	70	#5 Connecticut	64
23	January 23, 2020	Hartford, CT	#3 Connecticut	60	#23 Tennessee	45
24	January 21, 2021	Knoxville, TN	#3 Connecticut	67	#25 Tennessee	61
25	February 6, 2022	Hartford, CT	#10 Connecticut	75	#7 Tennessee	56
26	January 26, 2023	Knoxville, TN	#5 Connecticut	84	Tennessee	67
27	February 6, 2025	Knoxville, TN	#19 Tennessee	80	#5 Connecticut	76
28	February 1, 2026	Hartford, CT	#1 Connecticut	96	#15 Tennessee	66
Series: Connecticut leads 18–10

== Other sports ==
=== Football ===
The rivalry spread into other sports as the two schools agreed to play each other in other matchups. On September 4, 2008, UConn and Tennessee agreed to a home and home series in football for the 2015 and 2016 seasons, but in order for Tennessee to play Virginia Tech at Bristol Motor Speedway in 2016, the series has been postponed. Furthermore, because of UConn's "Group of Five" status while Tennessee was in the "Power Five," future matchups are likely to be rare. The two ultimately faced off in Knoxville on November 4, 2023, with the Volunteers winning 59–3.

=== Men's basketball ===
Nearly a year later on July 22, 2009, Huskies men's basketball head coach Jim Calhoun and Vols men's basketball head coach Bruce Pearl agreed to a home and home basketball series in the 2010–11 and 2011–12 seasons. Summitt's son Tyler was on the Volunteers' roster for both games, which the two schools split.

During the 2012–13 season, Tyler Summitt joined Marquette's coaching staff for the women's team, the final year of the pre-split Big East. The Huskies won against the Golden Eagles in both games. The Summitt family's rivalry is now at Connecticut 16, Summitts 10—Pat was 9–13 during the rivalry, while Tyler was 1–1 at Tennessee against Connecticut as a men's basketball player, and 0–2 as Marquette's assistant coach.
