= Rutgers–UConn women's basketball rivalry =

American college basketball rivalry

- UConn Huskies Rutgers Scarlet Knights
- Sport: Women's basketball
- First meeting: January 24, 1996; Connecticut 96, Rutgers 68
- Latest meeting: March 23, 2015; Connecticut 91, Rutgers 55
- Next meeting: TBD

Statistics
- Total meetings: 40
- All-time series: Connecticut leads 34–6
- Largest victory: Connecticut, 73–36 (2010); Connecticut, 72–35 (2014)
- Longest win streak: Connecticut, 14 (2008–present)
- Current win streak: Connecticut, 14 (2008–present)

The Rutgers–UConn women's basketball rivalry is a rivalry between the UConn Huskies and Rutgers Scarlet Knights women's basketball programs.

== History ==
As of March 2015, UConn leads the series 34–6, including 17 of the first 18 meetings between the two teams. When Rutgers joined the Big East Conference in 1995, the two teams met only once a year. The Connecticut Post describes Rutgers' first-ever win over UConn, a 74-70 win on February 10, 1998 at the Louis Brown Athletic Center, as the "catalyst in what has become a fierce rivalry." After the unranked Scarlet Knights nearly upset the then-undefeated Huskies on January 8, 2003, the two teams were scheduled to play twice during the 2003–04 regular season, and have done so every season since. While the Huskies would handily win the next three meetings, Rutgers finally broke through on February 18, 2005, as they defeated the Huskies for the first time in seven years, 76–62.

Locations of Rutgers and UConn

The rivalry had been partially fueled by an altercation that occurred between UConn head coach Geno Auriemma and former Rutgers player Cappie Pondexter after the 2005 Big East Tournament championship game. Auriemma reportedly made inappropriate remarks towards Pondexter, who retaliated by pointing her finger towards Auriemma. Big East Commissioner Michael Tranghese released a statement days later clearing Auriemma of any wrongdoing.

In recent years, the teams have faced off in games with championship implications. On March 7, 2007, the Scarlet Knights won their first-ever Big East Tournament championship by defeating the Huskies 55–47. However, on March 3, 2008, UConn beat Rutgers 66–46 for the regular-season championship, and the Knights haven't defeated the Huskies since.

After Tennessee stopped scheduling Rutgers, the Connecticut Post said in 2008 that Connecticut had become Rutgers' biggest rival. Auriemma said about Rutgers, ""A lot of times, they talked like they were better than they were and that kind of caused a lot more of an intensity level than maybe there would have been with anyone else."

== Game results ==
Connecticut victories	Rutgers victories

No.	Date	Location	Winner	Score		Series	Notes
No.	Date	Location	Winner	UC	RU	Series	Notes
1	January 24, 1996	Storrs, CT	Connecticut	96	68	Connecticut 1–0	
2	February 18, 1996	Piscataway, NJ	Connecticut	73	61	Connecticut 2–0	
3	March 3, 1996	Storrs, CT	Connecticut	93	64	Connecticut 3–0	Big East Tournament
4	January 15, 1997	Storrs, CT	Connecticut	78	45	Connecticut 4–0	
5	December 31, 1997	Storrs, CT	Connecticut	82	69	Connecticut 5–0	
6	February 10, 1998	Piscataway, NJ	Rutgers	70	74	Connecticut 5–1	
7	March 3, 1998	Piscataway, NJ	Connecticut	67	58	Connecticut 6–1	Big East Tournament
8	January 27, 1999	Piscataway, NJ	Connecticut	56	55	Connecticut 7–1	
9	January 17, 2000	Hartford, CT	Connecticut	65	50	Connecticut 8–1	
10	February 12, 2000	Piscataway, NJ	Connecticut	49	45	Connecticut 9–1	
11	March 7, 2000	Storrs, CT	Connecticut	79	59	Connecticut 10–1	Big East Tournament
12	February 14, 2001	Storrs, CT	Connecticut	70	45	Connecticut 11–1	
13	March 5, 2001	Storrs, CT	Connecticut	94	66	Connecticut 12–1	Big East Tournament
14	February 23, 2002	Piscataway, NJ	Connecticut	80	42	Connecticut 13–1	
15	January 8, 2003	Hartford, CT	Connecticut	67	62	Connecticut 14–1	
16	January 19, 2004	Hartford, CT	Connecticut	72	47	Connecticut 15–1	
17	February 14, 2004	Piscataway, NJ	Connecticut	66	43	Connecticut 16–1	
18	February 3, 2005	Hartford, CT	Connecticut	57	44	Connecticut 17–1	
19	February 13, 2005	Piscataway, NJ	Rutgers	62	76	Connecticut 17–2	
20	March 8, 2005	Hartford, CT	Connecticut	67	51	Connecticut 18–2	Big East Tournament
21	February 7, 2006	Storrs, CT	Rutgers	56	60	Connecticut 18–3	
22	February 27, 2006	Piscataway, NJ	Rutgers	42	48	Connecticut 18–4	
23	February 6, 2007	Storrs, CT	Connecticut	60	50	Connecticut 19–4	
24	February 26, 2007	Piscataway, NJ	Connecticut	70	44	Connecticut 20–4	
25	March 6, 2007	Hartford, CT	Rutgers	47	55	Connecticut 20–5	Big East Tournament
26	February 5, 2008	Piscataway, NJ	Rutgers	71	73	Connecticut 20–6	
27	March 3, 2008	Hartford, CT	Connecticut	66	46	Connecticut 21–6	
28	April 1, 2008	Greensboro, NC	Connecticut	66	56	Connecticut 22–6	NCAA Sweet Sixteen
29	February 3, 2009	Hartford, CT	Connecticut	75	56	Connecticut 23–6	
30	March 2, 2009	Piscataway, NJ	Connecticut	69	59	Connecticut 24–6	
31	January 26, 2010	Hartford, CT	Connecticut	73	36	Connecticut 25–6	
32	January 26, 2011	Piscataway, NJ	Connecticut	63	44	Connecticut 26–6	
33	March 7, 2011	Hartford, CT	Connecticut	75	51	Connecticut 27–6	Big East Tournament
34	February 4, 2012	Storrs, CT	Connecticut	66	34	Connecticut 28–6	
35	March 4, 2012	Hartford, CT	Connecticut	49	34	Connecticut 29–6	Big East Tournament
36	February 16, 2013	Piscataway, NJ	Connecticut	65	45	Connecticut 30–6	
37	January 19, 2014	Piscataway, NJ	Connecticut	94	64	Connecticut 31–6	
38	March 1, 2014	Storrs, CT	Connecticut	72	35	Connecticut 32–6	
39	March 9, 2014	Uncasville, CT	Connecticut	83	57	Connecticut 33–6	AAC Tournament
40	March 23, 2015	Storrs, CT	Connecticut	91	55	Connecticut 34–6	NCAA Second Round
