= 2000 NCAA Division I women's basketball tournament =

American college basketball tournament

- Teams: 64
- Finals site: First Union Center, Philadelphia, Pennsylvania
- Champions: Connecticut Huskies (2nd title, 2nd title game, 4th Final Four)
- Runner-up: Tennessee Lady Volunteers (9th title game, 12th Final Four)
- Semifinalists: Penn State Lady Lions (1st Final Four); Rutgers Scarlet Knights (1st Final Four)
- Winning coach: Geno Auriemma (2nd title)
- MOP: Shea Ralph (Connecticut)

The 2000 NCAA Division I women's basketball tournament began on March 17 and ended on April 2. The tournament featured 64 teams. The Final Four consisted of Connecticut, Penn St., Tennessee, and Rutgers, with Connecticut defeating Tennessee 71–52 to win its second NCAA title. Connecticut's Shea Ralph was named the Most Outstanding Player of the tournament.

== Notable events ==
Two of the number one seeds advanced to the Final four – Tennessee and Connecticut – while two failed to advance. Penn State upset Louisiana Tech in the Midwest Regional, while Rutgers upset Georgia in the West Regional. Tennessee faced Rutgers in one of the Final Four match ups. At the end of the half, the Lady Vols held only a two-point lead 28–26. Pat Summitt challenged her players at halftime, and advised Tamika Catchings to move around more. That advice helped, as Catchings, who had only scored two points in the first half, scored eleven in the second half. Michelle Snow blocked seven shots in the game setting a Final Four record. Kara Lawson ran the offense, and scored a total of 19 points, of which 14 were scored in the second half, and ended up earning the Player of the Game award, helping her team win 64–54 and advance to the national championship.

The other semifinal match up was Connecticut against Penn State. The regional win by Penn State gave the team a chance to play in a Final Four in their home state. The Lady Lions were led by point guard Helen Darling, who would go on to win the Frances Pomeroy Naismith Award that year. However, the defense by the Huskies held Darling scoreless on this day. UConn's point guard Sue Bird, had a better day, scoring 19 points, hitting five of her seven three point attempts. 20,060 fans were in the stands, the largest crowd ever to see a college basketball game in Pennsylvania. Connecticut had a nine-point lead at halftime, but Penn State had cut the lead to five points midway through the second half. However, the Huskies responded, and ended up winning the game by 22 points.

The match up in the finals between Tennessee and Connecticut was highly anticipated. The teams have met ten times prior to this meeting, with each team winning five. In eight of the ten meetings, one of the teams has had a number one ranking in the country. Much has been at stake, not just rankings, but winning streaks, national championships and pride.

Tennessee entered the final game on a 19-game winning streak; Connecticut on a 15-game winning streak, with their only loss of the season coming by a single point at the hands of Tennessee. UConn started the game with a 9–2 run. Kelly Schumacher set a record for blocks in a championship game, and had the record, with six, at halftime. She went on to record nine blocks, setting a new Final Four record, breaking the one established by Tennessee just two days before. The Huskies led 31–19 at the half, but the second half was yet to be played. Any chance of a comeback faded early, as UConn scored eight consecutive points to start the second half. Eight UConn players would get eleven or more minutes, giving Tennessee the impression that they were seeing fresh players every few minutes. Shea Ralph would score 15 points, on her way to winning the Most Outstanding Player award, and Svetlana Abrosimova scored 14. Connecticut ultimately defeated Tennessee by a score of 71–52 to win their second national championship.

The 2000 Final Four, played at the then-First Union Center (now Wells Fargo Center) in Philadelphia, was notable for featuring three head coaches who had ties to the Philadelphia area: Penn State coach Rene Portland grew up in the Philadelphia area, played at Immaculata College (now Immaculata University) in suburban Philadelphia, and briefly coached at St. Joseph's University in Philadelphia; Rutgers coach C. Vivian Stringer coached at then-Cheyney State College (now Cheyney University) in suburban Philadelphia earlier in her career, and national championship-winning Connecticut coach Geno Auriemma spent most of his childhood living in Norristown, Pennsylvania, located approximately 20 miles from Philadelphia, and served as a high school and college assistant coach in the Philadelphia area early in his coaching career.

== Tournament records ==
- Blocks – Kelly Schumacher, Connecticut, recorded nine blocks in the championship game against Tennessee, setting the record for blocks in a Final Four game.
- Blocks – Connecticut recorded eleven blocks in the championship game against Tennessee, setting the record for blocks in a Final Four game.
- Points – Connecticut scored 547 points in the tournament, setting the record for most points scored in an NCAA tournament.
- Field goal percentage – Connecticut hit 203 of 363 field goal attempts(56.1%), setting the record for the field goal percentage in an NCAA tournament.
- Steals – Connecticut recorded 81 steals in the tournament, setting the record for most steals in an NCAA tournament.
- Turnovers – Tennessee turned the ball over 26 times, a record for a championship game.

== Qualifying teams – automatic ==
Sixty-four teams were selected to participate in the 2000 NCAA Tournament. Thirty conferences were eligible for an automatic bid to the 2000 NCAA tournament.

Automatic bids
		Record		
Qualifying School	Conference	Regular Season	Conference	Seed
Alcorn State University	SWAC	22–8	15–3	16
Campbell University	Trans America	22–8	14–4	15
University of Connecticut	Big East	30–1	16–0	1
Dartmouth College	Ivy League	20–7	12–2	13
Drake University	Missouri Valley Conference	23–6	15–3	8
Duke University	ACC	26–5	12–4	2
Furman University	Southern Conference	20–10	13–5	16
University of Wisconsin–Green Bay	Horizon League	21–8	12–2	13
Hampton University	MEAC	16–14	11–7	16
College of the Holy Cross	Patriot League	23–6	11–1	15
Iowa State University	Big 12	25–5	13–3	3
Kent State University	MAC	25–5	15–1	9
Liberty University	Big South Conference	23–7	12–2	14
Louisiana Tech University	Sun Belt Conference	28–2	16–0	1
University of Montana	Big Sky Conference	22–7	13–3	16
Old Dominion University	Colonial	21–8	16–0	4
University of Oregon	Pac-10	23–7	14–4	6
Purdue University	Big Ten	22–7	11–5	4
Rice University	WAC	21–9	10–4	13
University of San Diego	West Coast Conference	17–12	7–7	15
St. Francis (PA)	Northeast Conference	23–7	15–3	14
Saint Peter's College	MAAC	23–7	14–4	14
Stephen F. Austin State University	Southland	27–3	17–1	11
University of Tennessee	SEC	28–3	13–1	1
Tennessee Technological University	Ohio Valley Conference	25–8	16–2	14
Tulane University	Conference USA	26–4	12–4	6
University of California, Santa Barbara	Big West Conference	30–3	15–0	4
University of Vermont	America East	25–5	15–3	11
Xavier University	Atlantic 10	26–4	13–3	6
Youngstown State University	Mid-Continent	22–8	12–4	15

== Qualifying teams – at-large ==
Thirty-four additional teams were selected to complete the sixty-four invitations.

At-large Bids
		Record		
Qualifying School	Conference	Regular Season	Conference	Seed
University of Arizona	Pacific-10	24–6	13–5	8
Auburn University	Southeastern	21–7	9–5	7
Boston College	Big East	25–8	12–4	5
Brigham Young University	Mountain West	22–8	10–4	12
Clemson University	Atlantic Coast	18–11	9–7	9
The George Washington University	Atlantic 10	25–5	14–2	7
University of Georgia	Southeastern	29–3	13–1	1
University of Illinois at Urbana–Champaign	Big Ten	22–10	11–5	6
University of Kansas	Big 12	20–9	11–5	8
Louisiana State University	Southeastern	22–6	11–3	3
University of Maine	America East	20–10	14–4	12
Marquette University	Conference USA	22–6	14–2	7
University of Michigan	Big Ten	22–7	13–3	8
Mississippi State University	Southeastern	23–7	8–6	3
Southwest Missouri State University	Missouri Valley	23–8	14–4	10
University of Nebraska–Lincoln	Big 12	18–12	10–6	12
University of North Carolina at Chapel Hill	Atlantic Coast	18–12	8–8	5
North Carolina State University	Atlantic Coast	20–8	11–5	5
University of Notre Dame	Big East	25–4	15–1	2
University of Oklahoma	Big 12	23–7	13–3	5
Pennsylvania State University	Big Ten	26–4	15–1	2
Pepperdine University	West Coast	21–9	12–2	13
Rutgers University	Big East	22–7	12–4	2
Southern Methodist University	Western Athletic	21–8	12–2	12
Saint Joseph's University	Atlantic 10	24–5	14–2	10
Stanford University	Pacific-10	20–8	13–5	9
University of Texas at Austin	Big 12	21–12	9–7	7
Texas Tech University	Big 12	25–4	13–3	3
University of Alabama at Birmingham	Conference USA	19–12	8–8	11
University of California, Los Angeles	Pacific-10	18–10	12–6	10
University of Utah	Mountain West	23–7	11–3	11
Vanderbilt University	Southeastern	20–12	6–8	9
University of Virginia	Atlantic Coast	23–8	13–3	4
Western Kentucky University	Sun Belt	21–9	13–3	10

== Bids by conference ==
Thirty conferences earned an automatic bid. In fifteen cases, the automatic bid was the only representative from the conference. Thirty-four additional at-large teams were selected from fifteen of the conferences.

Bids	Conference	Teams
6	Big 12	Iowa St., Kansas, Nebraska, Oklahoma, Texas, Texas Tech
6	Southeastern	Tennessee, Auburn, Georgia, LSU, Mississippi St., Vanderbilt
5	Atlantic Coast	Duke, Clemson, North Carolina, North Carolina St., Virginia
4	Big East	Connecticut, Boston College, Notre Dame, Rutgers
4	Big Ten	Purdue, Illinois, Michigan, Penn St.
4	Pacific-10	Oregon, Arizona, Stanford, UCLA
3	Atlantic 10	Xavier, George Washington, St. Joseph's
3	Conference USA	Tulane, Marquette, UAB
2	America East	Vermont, Maine
2	Missouri Valley	Drake, Missouri St.
2	Mountain West	BYU, Utah
2	Northeast	St. Francis Pa., St. Peter's
2	Sun Belt	Louisiana Tech, Western Kentucky
2	West Coast	San Diego, Pepperdine
2	Western Athletic	Rice, SMU
1	Big Sky	Montana
1	Big South	Liberty
1	Big West	UC Santa Barb.
1	Colonial	Old Dominion
1	Horizon	Green Bay
1	Ivy	Dartmouth
1	Mid-American	Kent St.
1	Mid-Continent	Youngstown St.
1	Mid-Eastern	Hampton.
1	Ohio Valley	Tennessee Tech
1	Patriot	Holy Cross
1	Southern	Furman
1	Southland	Stephen F. Austin
1	Southwestern	Alcorn St.
1	Trans America	Campbell

== 2000 NCAA tournament schedule and venues ==
2000 NCAA first and second round venues – Fri/Sun (pink) and Sat/Mon (green)
2000 NCAA regionals (blue) and Final Four (red)

In 2000, the field remained at 64 teams. The teams were seeded, and assigned to four geographic regions, with seeds 1-16 in each region. In Round 1, seeds 1 and 16 faced each other, as well as seeds 2 and 15, seeds 3 and 14, seeds 4 and 13, seeds 5 and 12, seeds 6 and 11, seeds 7 and 10, and seeds 8 and 9. In the first two rounds, the top four seeds were given the opportunity to host the first-round game. In most cases, the higher seed accepted the opportunity. The exception:

- Third seeded Mississippi State was unable to host, so sixth-seeded Oregon hosted three first- and second-round games

First and Second rounds

The following lists the region, host school, venue and the sixteen first- and second-round locations:

- March 17 and 19
  - East Region
    - Pete Maravich Assembly Center, Baton Rouge, Louisiana (Host: Louisiana State University)
    - Harry A. Gampel Pavilion, Storrs, Connecticut (Host: University of Connecticut)
  - Mideast Region
    - Joyce Center, Notre Dame, Indiana (Host: University of Notre Dame)
    - University Hall, Charlottesville, Virginia (Host: University of Virginia)
  - Midwest Region
    - Hilton Coliseum, Ames, Iowa (Host: Iowa State University)
    - Bryce Jordan Center, State College, Pennsylvania (Host: Pennsylvania State University)
  - West Region
    - Louis Brown Athletic Center, Piscataway, New Jersey (Host: Rutgers University)
    - McArthur Court, Eugene, Oregon (Host: University of Oregon)
- March 18 and 20
  - East Region
    - Mackey Arena, West Lafayette, Indiana (Host: Purdue University)
    - Cameron Indoor Stadium, Durham, North Carolina (Host: Duke University)
  - Mideast Region
    - Thompson–Boling Arena, Knoxville, Tennessee (Host: University of Tennessee)
    - United Spirit Arena, Lubbock, Texas (Host: Texas Tech University)
  - Midwest Region
    - Old Dominion University Fieldhouse, Norfolk, Virginia (Host: Old Dominion University)
    - Thomas Assembly Center, Ruston, Louisiana (Host: Louisiana Tech University)
  - West Region
    - Stegeman Coliseum, Athens, Georgia (Host: University of Georgia)
    - UC Santa Barbara Events Center, Santa Barbara, California (Host: University of California, Santa Barbara)

Regional semifinals and finals

The Regionals, named for the general location, were held from March 25 to March 27 at these sites:

- March 25 and 27
  - East Regional, Siegel Center, Richmond, Virginia (Host: Virginia Commonwealth University)
  - Mideast Regional, Pyramid Arena, Memphis, Tennessee (Host: University of Memphis)
  - Midwest Regional, Municipal Auditorium, Kansas City, Missouri (Host: University of Kansas)
  - West Regional, Veterans Memorial Coliseum, Portland, Oregon (Host: Portland State University)

Each regional winner advanced to the Final Four held March 31 and April 2 in Philadelphia at the Wells Fargo Center (Co-hosts: St. Joseph's University and University of Pennsylvania)

== Bids by state ==
The sixty-four teams came from thirty-three states, plus Washington, D.C. Two states, California and Texas, had the most teams with five bids. Seventeen states did not have any teams receiving bids.

NCAA Women's basketball Tournament invitations by state 2000

Bids	State	Teams
5	California	San Diego, UC Santa Barb., Pepperdine, Stanford, UCLA
5	Texas	Rice, Stephen F. Austin, SMU, Texas, Texas Tech
4	North Carolina	Campbell, Duke, North Carolina, North Carolina St.
4	Virginia	Hampton., Liberty, Old Dominion, Virginia
3	Louisiana	Louisiana Tech, Tulane, LSU
3	Ohio	Kent St., Xavier, Youngstown St.
3	Tennessee	Tennessee, Tennessee Tech, Vanderbilt
2	Alabama	Auburn, UAB
2	Indiana	Purdue, Notre Dame
2	Iowa	Drake, Iowa St.
2	Massachusetts	Holy Cross, Boston College
2	Mississippi	Alcorn St., Mississippi St.
2	New Jersey	St. Peter's, Rutgers
3	Pennsylvania	Penn St., St. Joseph's, St Francis
2	South Carolina	Furman, Clemson
2	Utah	BYU, Utah
2	Wisconsin	Green Bay, Marquette
1	Arizona	Arizona
1	Connecticut	Connecticut
1	District of Columbia	George Washington
1	Georgia	Georgia
1	Illinois	Illinois
1	Kansas	Kansas
1	Kentucky	Western Kỳ.
1	Maine	Maine
1	Michigan	Michigan
1	Missouri	Missouri St.
1	Montana	Montana
1	Nebraska	Nebraska
1	New Hampshire	Dartmouth
1	Oklahoma	Oklahoma
1	Oregon	Oregon
1	Vermont	Vermont

== Brackets ==
Data source

* – Denotes overtime period

=== East regional – Richmond, Virginia ===
First round March 17–18
1	Connecticut	116
16	Hampton	45
Storrs, Connecticut – Fri/Sun
8	Drake	50
9	Clemson	64
5	Oklahoma	86
12	BYU	81
West Lafayette, Indiana – Sat/Mon
4	Purdue	70
13	Dartmouth	66
6	Xavier	72
11	Stephen F. Austin	73
Baton Rouge, Louisiana – Fri/Sun
3	LSU	77
14	Liberty	54
7	Marquette	65
10	Western Kentucky	68
Durham, North Carolina – Sat/Mon
2	Duke	71
15	Campbell	42

Second round March 19–20
1	Connecticut	83
9	Clemson	45
5	Oklahoma	76
4	Purdue	74
11	Stephen F. Austin	45
3	LSU	57
10	Western Kentucky	70
2	Duke	90

Regional semifinals March 25
1	Connecticut	102
5	Oklahoma	80
3	LSU	79
2	Duke	66

Regional finals March 27
1	Connecticut	86
3	LSU	71

=== Midwest regional – Kansas City, Missouri ===
First round March 17–18
1	Louisiana Tech	95
16	Alcorn State	53
Ruston, Louisiana – Sat/Mon
8	Kansas	69
9	Vanderbilt	71**
5	NC State	63
12	SMU	64
Norfolk, Virginia – Sat/Mon
4	Old Dominion	94
13	Green Bay	85
6	Illinois	73
11	Utah	58
Ames, Iowa – Fri/Sun
3	Iowa State	92
14	Saint Francis	63
7	Auburn	78
10	Southwest Missouri State	74
State College, Pennsylvania – Fri/Sun
2	Penn State	83
15	Youngstown State	63

Second round March 19–20
1	Louisiana Tech	66
9	Vanderbilt	65
12	SMU	76
4	Old Dominion	96
6	Illinois	68
3	Iowa State	79
7	Auburn	69
2	Penn State	75

Regional semifinals March 25
1	Louisiana Tech	86
4	Old Dominion	74
3	Iowa State	65
2	Penn State	66

Regional finals March 27
1	Louisiana Tech	65
2	Penn State	86

=== Mideast regional – Memphis, Tennessee ===
First round March 17–18
1	Tennessee	90
16	Furman	38
Knoxville, Tennessee – Sat/Mon
8	Arizona	73
9	Kent State	61
5	Boston College	93
12	Nebraska	76
Charlottesville, Virginia – Fri/Sun
4	Virginia	74
13	Pepperdine	62
6	Tulane	65
11	Vermont	60
Lubbock, Texas – Sat/Mon
3	Texas Tech	83
14	Tennessee Tech	54
7	George Washington	79
10	UCLA	72
Notre Dame, Indiana – Fri/Sun
2	Notre Dame	87
15	San Diego	61

Second round March 19–20
1	Tennessee	75
8	Arizona	60
5	Boston College	70
4	Virginia	74
6	Tulane	59
3	Texas Tech	76
7	George Washington	60
2	Notre Dame	95

Regional semifinals March 25
1	Tennessee	77
4	Virginia	56
3	Texas Tech	69
2	Notre Dame	65

Regional finals March 27
1	Tennessee	57
3	Texas Tech	44

=== West regional – Portland, Oregon ===
First round March 17–18
1	Georgia	74
16	Montana	46
Athens, Georgia – Sat/Mon
8	Michigan	74
9	Stanford	81*
5	North Carolina	62
12	Maine	57
Santa Barbara, California – Sat/Mon
4	UC Santa Barbara	64
13	Rice	67
6	Oregon	79
11	UAB	80*
Eugene, Oregon – Fri/Sun
3	Mississippi State	94
14	St. Peter's	60
7	Texas	48
10	St. Joseph's	69
Piscataway, New Jersey – Fri/Sun
2	Rutgers	91
15	Holy Cross	70

Second round March 19–20
1	Georgia	83
9	Stanford	64
5	North Carolina	83
13	Rice	50
11	UAB	78
3	Mississippi St.	72
10	St. Joseph's	39
2	Rutgers	59

Regional semifinals March 25
1	Georgia	83
5	North Carolina	57
11	UAB	45
2	Rutgers	60

Regional finals March 27
1	Georgia	51
2	Rutgers	59

=== Final Four – Philadelphia ===
National semifinals March 31
E1	Connecticut	89
MW2	Penn St.	67
ME1	Tennessee	64
W2	Rutgers	54

National championship April 2
E1	Connecticut	71
ME1	Tennessee	52

== Record by conference ==
Seventeen conferences had more than one bid, or at least one win in NCAA Tournament play:

Conference	# of Bids	Record	Win %	Round of 32	Sweet Sixteen	Elite Eight	Final Four	Championship Game
Southeastern	6	14–6	.700	6	3	3	1	1
Big 12	6	7–6	.538	3	3	1	–	–
Atlantic Coast	5	7–5	.583	4	3	–	–	–
Big East	4	13–3	.813	4	3	2	2	1
Big Ten	4	6–4	.600	3	1	1	1	–
Pacific-10	4	2–4	.333	2	–	–	–	–
Conference USA	3	3–3	.500	2	1	–	–	–
Atlantic 10	3	2–3	.400	2	–	–	–	–
Sun Belt	2	4–2	.667	2	1	1	–	–
Western Athletic	2	2–2	.500	2	–	–	–	–
America East	2	0–2	–	–	–	–	–	–
Missouri Valley	2	0–2	–	–	–	–	–	–
Mountain West	2	0–2	–	–	–	–	–	–
Northeast	2	0–2	–	–	–	–	–	–
West Coast	2	0–2	–	–	–	–	–	–
Colonial	1	2–1	.667	1	1	–	–	–
Southland	1	1–1	.500	1	–	–	–	–

Thirteen conferences went 0-1: Big Sky Conference, Big South Conference, Big West Conference, Horizon League, Ivy League, MAC, Mid-Continent, MEAC, Ohio Valley Conference, Patriot League, Southern Conference, SWAC, and Trans America

== All-Tournament team ==
- Shea Ralph, Connecticut
- Svetlana Abrosimova, Connecticut
- Sue Bird, Connecticut
- Asjha Jones, Connecticut
- Tamika Catchings, Tennessee

== Game officials ==
- Scott Yarbrough (semifinal)
- Ron Dressander (semifinal)
- Carla Fujimoto (semifinal)
- Bob Trammel (semifinal)
- Wesley Dean (semifinal)
- Bob Trammel (semifinal)
- Sally Bell (final)
- Dennis DeMayo (final)
- Art Bomengen (final)

== See also ==
- 2000 NCAA Division I men's basketball tournament
- 2000 NCAA Division II women's basketball tournament
- 2000 NCAA Division III women's basketball tournament
- 2000 NAIA Division I women's basketball tournament
- 2000 NAIA Division II women's basketball tournament
