= Gary Blair =

American sports coach

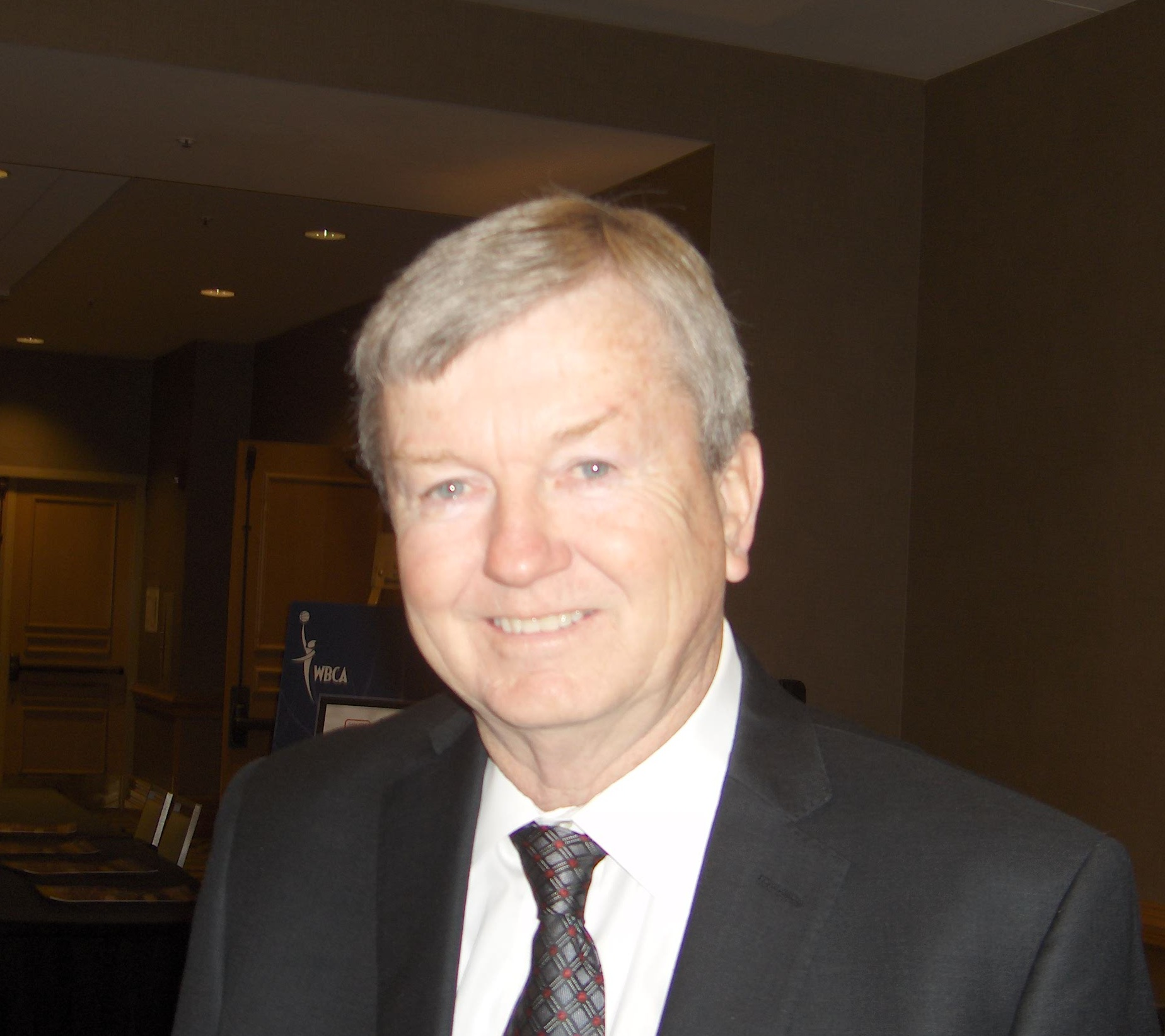
- Blair in 2011

Biographical details
- Born: August 10, 1945 (age 81); Dallas, Texas, U.S.

Playing career

Baseball
- 1964: Texas Tech
- Position: CF

Coaching career (HC unless noted)
- 1973–1980: South Oak Cliff HS
- 1980–1985: Louisiana Tech (asst.)
- 1985–1993: Stephen F. Austin
- 1993–2003: Arkansas
- 2003–2022: Texas A&M

Head coaching record
- Overall: 852–348 (.710)

Accomplishments and honors

Championships
- NCAA Division I (2011); 2× NCAA Regional—Final Four (1998, 2011); SEC regular season (2021); 2× Big 12 Tournament (2008, 2010); SEC tournament (2013); Big 12 regular season (2007); WNIT (1999); 7× Southland regular season (1987–1993); 6× Southland Tournament (1988–1993); 3× Texas Class 4A High School (1977, 1978, 1980)
- Basketball Hall of Fame; Inducted in 2023 (profile)
- Women's Basketball Hall of Fame
Medal record
Assistant coach for Women's Basketball
United States
William Jones Cup
Gold medal – first place	1996 Taipei	Team competition

Gary Claude Blair (born August 10, 1945) is an American retired women's basketball head coach. He coached for 37 years closing with Texas A&M Aggies women's basketball, who he coached from 2003 until his retirement in 2022. In his 37 years as a collegiate head coach, Blair only suffered two losing seasons, and has reached postseason play 28 times, including 23 NCAA Tournament appearances and Final Four appearances in 1998 with Arkansas and 2011 with Texas A&M. He led the Aggies to the NCAA national championship in 2011. He is listed in the top 35 of the all-time winningest NCAA Division I women's basketball coaches, and he is one of the few coaches to guide three different schools to national rankings and NCAA Tournament berths. Blair was inducted into the Women's Basketball Hall of Fame in 2013 and the Naismith Basketball Hall of Fame in 2023.

== Early life ==
Gary Blair is the son of Lee, a plaster foreman, and Jean, a housewife. He was raised in the Forest Hills neighborhood of Dallas. He grew up playing baseball, and as a 128-pound center fielder at Bryan Adams High School, he received all-city honors in 1963. Following his high school graduation in 1963, he enrolled at Texas Tech University, where he failed out of architecture, and moved to California to become a restaurant manager. He got a U.S. Army draft notice in 1969, and decided to enlist in the U.S. Marine Corps, completing a two-year tour of duty. He was stationed in Okinawa during his duty. After his tour, he lived in the Los Angeles area, running a restaurant in Costa Mesa and Culver City. At age 27, he used his G.I. Bill to earn a bachelor's degree in health and physical education with a minor in journalism from Texas Tech. He also played a year of baseball for the Red Raiders—he was a defensive center fielder with self-described poor hitting skills. He earned his master's degree in education from the school in 1974.

When head women's basketball coach Marsha Sharp retired from Texas Tech in 2006, Blair got calls from his friends to take over the position. Blair stated, "It wasn't the right fit or the right time. Timing is everything in coaching."

== Early coaching career ==
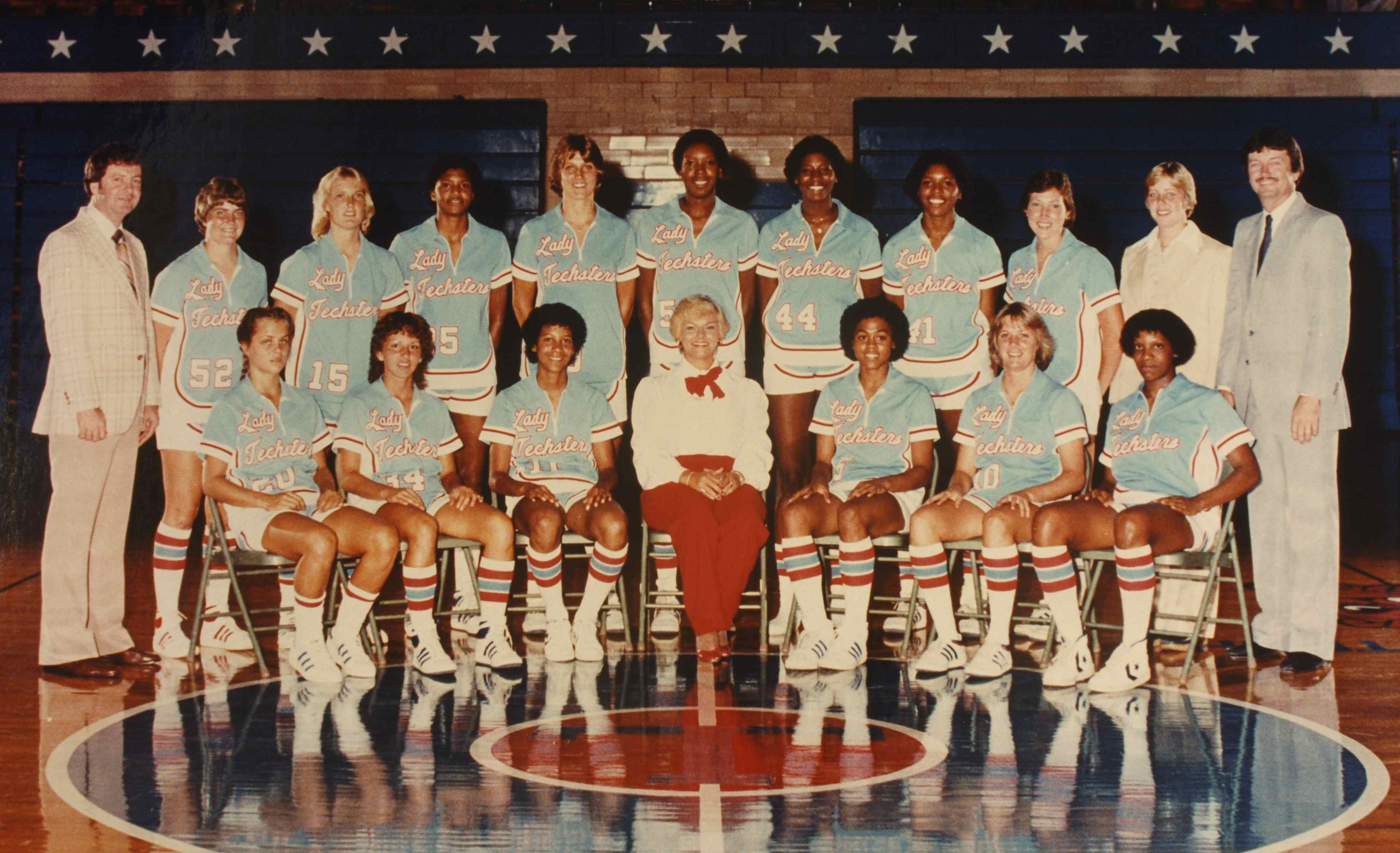
1982 Louisiana Tech women's basketball team

After his graduation from Texas Tech, Blair hoped to find a high school baseball coaching job in Lubbock, but he was offered the physical education coach gig at South Oak Cliff High School in Dallas, a predominantly Black school. South Oak Cliff had just started its women's basketball program, and Blair became the team's first coach in 1973. He was initially the boy's P.E. teacher, while waiting for an offer to coach the baseball team, but when asked to coach the girls' team, he accepted. He also started the boys and girls golf team, and served as its first coach as well. He made $7,000 annually coaching all of these sports.

In his seven seasons at South Oak Cliff, he set a state record with five consecutive state tournament appearances and a 239–18 record. His teams won three state Class 4A championships, in 1977, 1978, and 1980, and finished as the runner-up in 1979 by only two points. For his efforts, Blair was inducted into the Texas High School Basketball Hall of Fame. At South Oak Cliff, Blair coached Debra and Kim Rodman, Dennis Rodman's sisters. Blair used to play ping pong with Dennis. After winning the first state championship, he was offered the head baseball job he had been waiting for, but he turned it down to remain coaching the women's teams.

In October 1980, Blair was offered an assistant coaching job at Louisiana Tech by then-head coach Sonja Hogg. At the time of the offer, Blair was making an annual salary of $22,000. The Louisiana Tech position paid $22,500 and also provided a six-year-old brown station wagon. Blair initially rejected the offer, but upon his wife's encouragement, he accepted it. He would coach under Leon Barmore, who replaced Hogg. During his five seasons there, Louisiana Tech reached the Final Four in the NCAA Tournament four times, winning two national championships.

== Head coaching career ==
=== Stephen F. Austin (1985–1993) ===
Blair's first head coaching experience at the collegiate level came at Stephen F. Austin University in Nacogdoches, Texas. In his eight years with the school, he compiled a 210–43 record, including 25 wins in just his second season as a head coach. His teams won seven straight conference championships, and appeared in the NCAA Tournament six times. During his last six seasons, his teams were consistently ranked in the final AP Top 25 polls. The team's success was noticed by their fans, who increased home attendance enough to allow the school to rank in the top 12 of NCAA Division 1 attendance leaders.

It was during his time at SFA that Blair met his future assistant coach Vic Schaefer, who was coaching the Sam Houston State Bearkats (one of SFA's main rivals) at the time.

Blair was inducted into the Ladyjack Hall of Fame during halftime of the Ladyjacks game against the Aggies on December 2, 2008.

=== Arkansas (1993–2003) ===
As the head coach of the women's basketball team at Arkansas, Blair compiled a 198–120 record. During his first season, the Lady Razorbacks won 15 of their 29 games, their first winning season in several years. The following year his team, which consisted of 9 freshmen and sophomores, won 23 games and reached the second round of the NCAA tournament.

In the summer of 1996, while his Arkansas team was in their offseason, Blair spent several months in Taiwan as the assistant coach of the U.S. Jones Cup team, which won the gold medal and became the first U.S. team to be undefeated at the Jones Cup tournament. Every one of the players he helped coach during that tournament later went on to play in the WNBA.

Blair made history with his 1997–98 team. The team, unranked in the national polls, received a No. 9 seed for the NCAA Tournament and reached the NCAA Final Four. His teams reached the semifinals in the SEC tournament in both 2001 and 2002.

In his final season with the Lady Razorbacks, the team finished the season ranked 24th nationally and reached the second round of the NCAA Tournament. Despite Blair's winning record at Arkansas and taking the program to its first ever Final Four just four years earlier, then-women's program athletic director Bev Lewis relieved Blair of his coaching duties after the season. Blair and Lewis did not get along, and their professional relationship became even more strained once the Arkansas athletic programs were divided and Lewis became the women's AD.

=== Texas A&M (2003–2022) ===
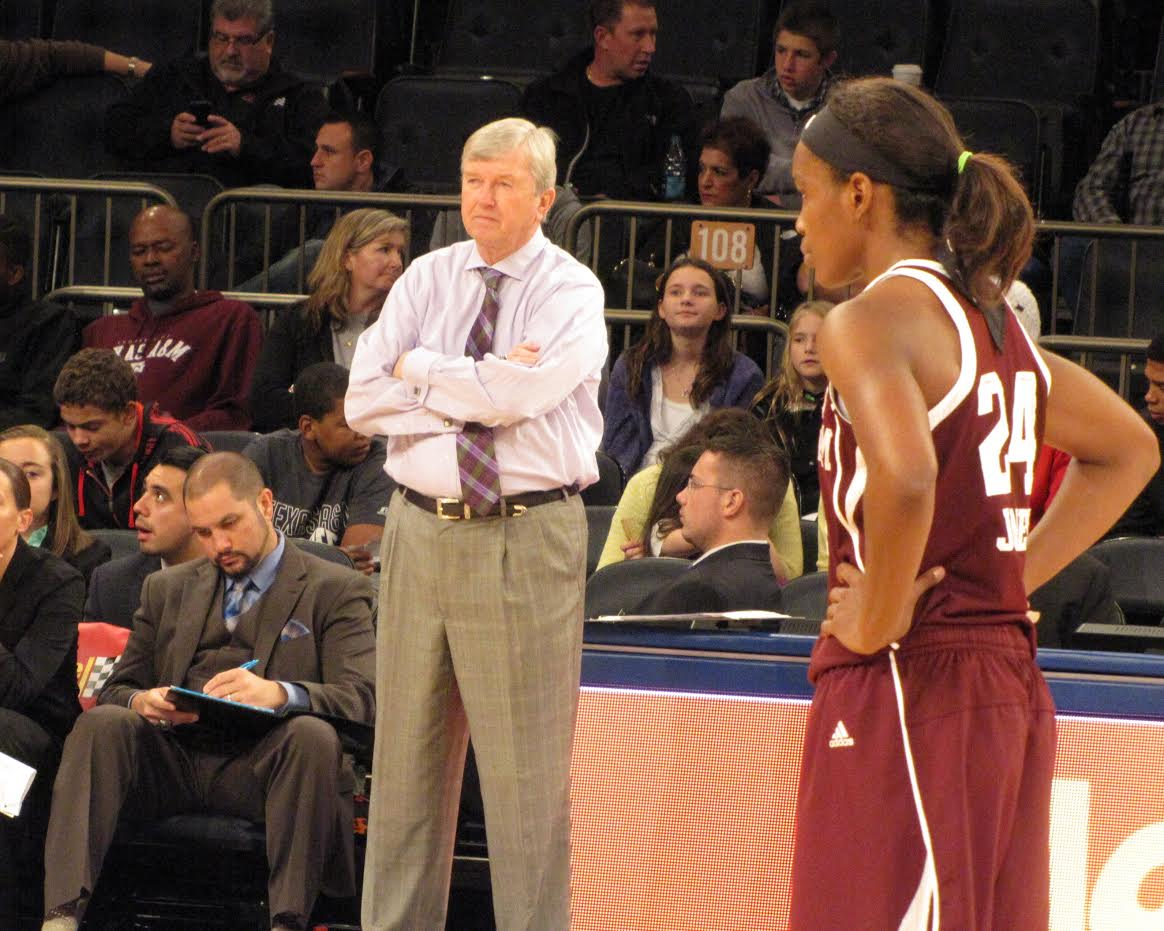
Gary Blair (and Jordan Jones) at the Maggie Dixon Classic in Madison Square Garden December 22, 2013

Blair arrived at Texas A&M in 2003, taking over the Big 12 Conference's worst team, which had not had a winning season in seven years. In his first season with Texas A&M, Blair worked very hard to attract fans to the women's basketball games, and by the end of the season attendance had increased 71 percent over the previous year, the best increase in the Big 12 Conference. For the first time in his career, however, one of Blair's team suffered a losing season.

The following year the Aggies improved, earning a postseason invitation for the first time since 1996.

In his third season with the Aggies, Blair guided his team to their first Associated Press Top 25 ranking in ten years. The team won 23 games (losing 9), the third-most victories in school history and a tie for the most victories in conference play ever (11 wins, 5 losses in conference). The team finished third in the Big 12, and reached the semifinals in the Big 12 Women's Championship Tournament. With a Number 6 seed to the NCAA Tournament (A&M's first such invitation since 1996), Blair became only the fourth coach in NCAA history to take three different schools to the NCAA Tournament, although this became his only appearance where his team lost in the first round.

Following their successful season, Blair was named the Women's Basketball News Service National Coach of the Year.

Overall, in his first three years as the head coach of the Aggies, A&M home attendance increased 156%, with a school-record 11,088 fans watching the team play Baylor University.

In the 2006–2007 season, Blair's Aggies again scored over 20 wins and reached the NCAA Tournament, this time as the fourth seed, and advanced to the second round of the tournament. This marked the first time in Aggie history that the women's basketball team had earned consecutive NCAA tournament berths.

On February 20, 2008, Blair posted his 500th career win as a head coach at Reed Arena against the Iowa State Cyclones.

In the 2007–08 season, Blair led his squad to a school-first NCAA Elite Eight appearance and a 29–8 overall record. The team also won the 2008 Big 12 conference tournament title. In the NCAA tournament, the team lost to eventual national champion Tennessee. After the season, the Texas A&M Board of Regents approved a one-year contract extension through 2012, and a $150,000 salary raise to $800,000 annually.

On March 29, 2011, Gary Blair led the program to its first ever Final Four appearance by defeating top-seeded Baylor 58–46.

On April 3, 2011, the Aggies defeated top-seeded Stanford 63–62 to advance to the national title game. Two days later, the Aggies defeated Notre Dame 76–70 in the championship game to win the tournament for the first time in school history. Blair, 65, also became the oldest women's coach to win a national championship.

Gary Blair was also selected as a 2012 namesake for Texas A&M's extended orientation camp, "Fish Camp".

On October 28, 2021, Blair announced he would retire from coaching at the conclusion of the 2021-22 season.

== USA Basketball ==
Gary Blair was named the assistant coach of the 1996 R. William Jones Cup Team. The competition was held in Taipei, Taiwan. The USA team was dominant, winning their games by an average off 33 points per game. The USA team won their opening seven games, behind the scoring leadership of Sheri Sam, who averaged 13 points per game. In the eighth game, they played undefeated Slovakia, in a game that would determine the gold medal. The USA fell behind; Slovakia had a 22–15 lead. The USA came back, but was still behind at halftime. The game was tied at 45 all, when the USA hit several free throws to take a lead they would not give up. The USA team won the game and the championship 72–62. In the final game, the USA beat South Korea to finish the competition with a perfect 9–0 record.

== Coaching honors ==
Blair has received the following honors over his coaching career:

- 2013 Women's Basketball Hall of Fame
- 2009 Southland Conference Hall of Honor inductee
- 2008 Stephen F. Austin State University Ladyjack Hall of Fame inductee
- 2007 Big 12 Conference Coach of the Year
- 2007 Naismith College Coach of the Year finalist
- 2007 Texas Association of Basketball Coaches Coach of the Year
- 2006 Women's Basketball News Service National Coach of the Year
- 2003 Naismith Coach of the Year Finalist
- 2002 Texas High School Basketball Hall of Famer
- 1996 U.S. Jones Cup Team Assistant Coach
- 1995 Basketball Times National Coach of the Year
- 1995 Women's Basketball News Service National Coach of the Year
- Five-time Southland Conference Coach of the Year (1988, 1990, 1991, 1992, 1993)
- Five-time District VI Converse Coach of the Year

== Hall of Fame ==
Blair was inducted in the Women's Basketball Hall of Fame in June 2013. Joe McKeown, the head women's basketball coach at Northwestern delivered the introduction speech by videotape. His credentials include 28 years of head coaching experience at Stephen F. Austin, Arkansas and Texas A&M with a 71% lifetime winning percentage, along with the 2011 Division I National Championship.

He was also inducted into the Naismith Basketball Hall of Fame in 2023.

== Coaching style ==
He stresses offensive rebounding and defense to his teams, and his 2007 Texas A&M team ranked among the nation's best in scoring defense, blocked shots, and steals.

Much of his recruiting is done in-state, and Blair says that he recruits students for their offensive showing and then teaches them to play defense later.

== Family and personal ==
Blair is married to Kyla Blair and has four children and nine grandchildren.

Blair is also actively involved with the community. He has been a member of Rotary International for more than 20 years. He has also held his "Celebrity Golf Classic" to benefit Special Olympics for over 15 years; recently, the program has raised over $100,000 annually.

== Coaching record ==
Record table
Season	Team	Overall	Conference	Standing	Postseason
Stephen F. Austin Ladyjacks (Gulf Star Conference) (1985–1987)
1985–86	Stephen F. Austin	16–12	7–3		
1986–87	Stephen F. Austin	25–6	9–1	1st	WNIT Third Round
Stephen F. Austin:			16–4 (.800)		
Stephen F. Austin Ladyjacks (Southland Conference) (1987–1993)
1987–88	Stephen F. Austin	29–5	13–1	1st	NCAA second round
1988–89	Stephen F. Austin	30–4	13–1	1st	NCAA Sweet Sixteen
1989–90	Stephen F. Austin	28–3	14–0	1st	NCAA Sweet Sixteen
1990–91	Stephen F. Austin	25–6	14–0	1st	NCAA second round
1991–92	Stephen F. Austin	28–3	17–1	1st	NCAA Sweet Sixteen
1992–93	Stephen F. Austin	28–5	17–1	1st	NCAA Sweet Sixteen
Stephen F. Austin:		210–43 (.830)	88–4 (.957)		
Arkansas Ladybacks (Southeastern Conference) (1993–2003)
1993–94	Arkansas	15–14	3–8	9th	
1994–95	Arkansas	23–7	7–4	T–4th	NCAA second round
1995–96	Arkansas	21–13	3–8	10th	WNIT Fourth Place
1996–97	Arkansas	18–10	5–7	T–7th	
1997–98	Arkansas	22–11	7–7	T–6th	NCAA Final Four
1998–99	Arkansas	20–14	5–9	11th	WNIT Champions
1999–00	Arkansas	17–15	4–10	10th	WNIT Semifinals
2000–01	Arkansas	20–13	6–8	T–6th	NCAA second round
2001–02	Arkansas	20–12	7–7	T–7th	NCAA second round
2002–03	Arkansas	22–11	7–7	7th	NCAA second round
Arkansas:		198–120 (.623)	54–75 (.419)		
Texas A&M Aggies (Big 12 Conference) (2003–2012)
2003–04	Texas A&M	9–19	2–14	T–11th	
2004–05	Texas A&M	16–15	4–12	T–9th	WNIT Quarterfinals
2005–06	Texas A&M	23–9	11–5	3rd	NCAA first round
2006–07	Texas A&M	25–7	13–3	T–1st	NCAA second round
2007–08	Texas A&M	29–8	11–5	T–3rd	NCAA Elite Eight
2008–09	Texas A&M	27–8	11–5	T–3rd	NCAA Sweet Sixteen
2009–10	Texas A&M	26–8	10–6	T–4th	NCAA second round
2010–11	Texas A&M	33–5	13–3	2nd	NCAA Champions
2011–12	Texas A&M	24–11	11–7	T–2nd	NCAA Sweet Sixteen
Texas A&M:		212–90 (.702)	86–60 (.589)		
Texas A&M Aggies (Southeastern Conference) (2012–2022)
2012–13	Texas A&M	25–10	11–5	T–4th	NCAA second round
2013–14	Texas A&M	27–9	13–3	T–2nd	NCAA Elite Eight
2014–15	Texas A&M	23–10	10–6	T–4th	NCAA first round
2015–16	Texas A&M	22–10	11–5	T–2nd	NCAA second round
2016–17	Texas A&M	22–12	9-7	6th	NCAA second round
2017–18	Texas A&M	26–10	11-5	T-4th	NCAA Sweet Sixteen
2018–19	Texas A&M	26–8	12-4	3rd	NCAA Sweet Sixteen
2019–20	Texas A&M	22–7	10–6	T–3rd	Postseason not held due to COVID-19
2020–21	Texas A&M	25–3	13–1	1st	NCAA Sweet Sixteen
2021–22	Texas A&M	14–15	4–12	T–12th	
Texas A&M:		444–184 (.707)	104–54 (.658)		
Total:		852–347 (.711)			
National champion Postseason invitational champion Conference regular season champion Conference regular season and conference tournament champion Division regular season champion Division regular season and conference tournament champion Conference tournament champion

== See also ==
- List of college women's basketball career coaching wins leaders
