= Warren Angus Ferris =

- Born: December 26, 1810; Glens Falls, New York
- Died: February 8, 1873 (aged 62); Forest Hills, Texas
- Occupation: Surveyor
- Notable work: Life in the Rocky Mountains
- Spouses: Melinda G. Cook; Frances Moore
- Children: 12

Warren Angus Ferris (December 26, 1810 – February 8, 1873) was a trapper, cartographer and diarist in the Rocky Mountains from 1830 to 1835. From 1829–1835, he traveled to Cache Valley and the Snake River area with the American Fur Company. With the help of Native American guides, he explored what is now Yellowstone National Park in 1834. He recorded his experiences in a journal that was published as the book Life in the Rocky Mountains in 1940. The book contained the first settler-made map of the area, called the "Map of the Northwest Fur Country." Ferris became a surveyor in Texas in the area that is now Dallas. He also served on the Texas State Congress. Ferris settled down as a farmer in his later life and wrote articles for the Dallas Herald newspaper.

== Biography ==
=== Early life ===
Warren Angus Ferris (Ferriss) was born December 26, 1810, in Glens Falls, New York, to Angus and Sarah Ferris. His ancestors were Puritans and Quakers. Through his paternal grandmother, Ruth (Taber) Ferris, he was the descendent of 8 Mayflower passengers, which include Frances Cooke, John Cooke, Richard Warren, William Mullins, Alice Mullins, Priscilla Mullins, John Alden, and Thomas Rogers. In 1806, Ferris' grandfather, Warren Ferriss, was appointed Brigadier General of Militia in Washington Co. by Governor Morgan Lewis. Ferris's father, Angus, died from a sudden illness in 1813, leaving a widow and 2 infant children. Sarah Ferris moved to Buffalo, N.Y. where she married Joshua Lovejoy, on Aug. 13, 1815, as his second wife. Sarah continued to live in Buffalo with her 2 daughters until her death at the age of 79. Ferris grew up with his family in Buffalo. Although it is unclear whether Ferris received a formal education, his mother provided her children with books and helped expose them to nature and science.

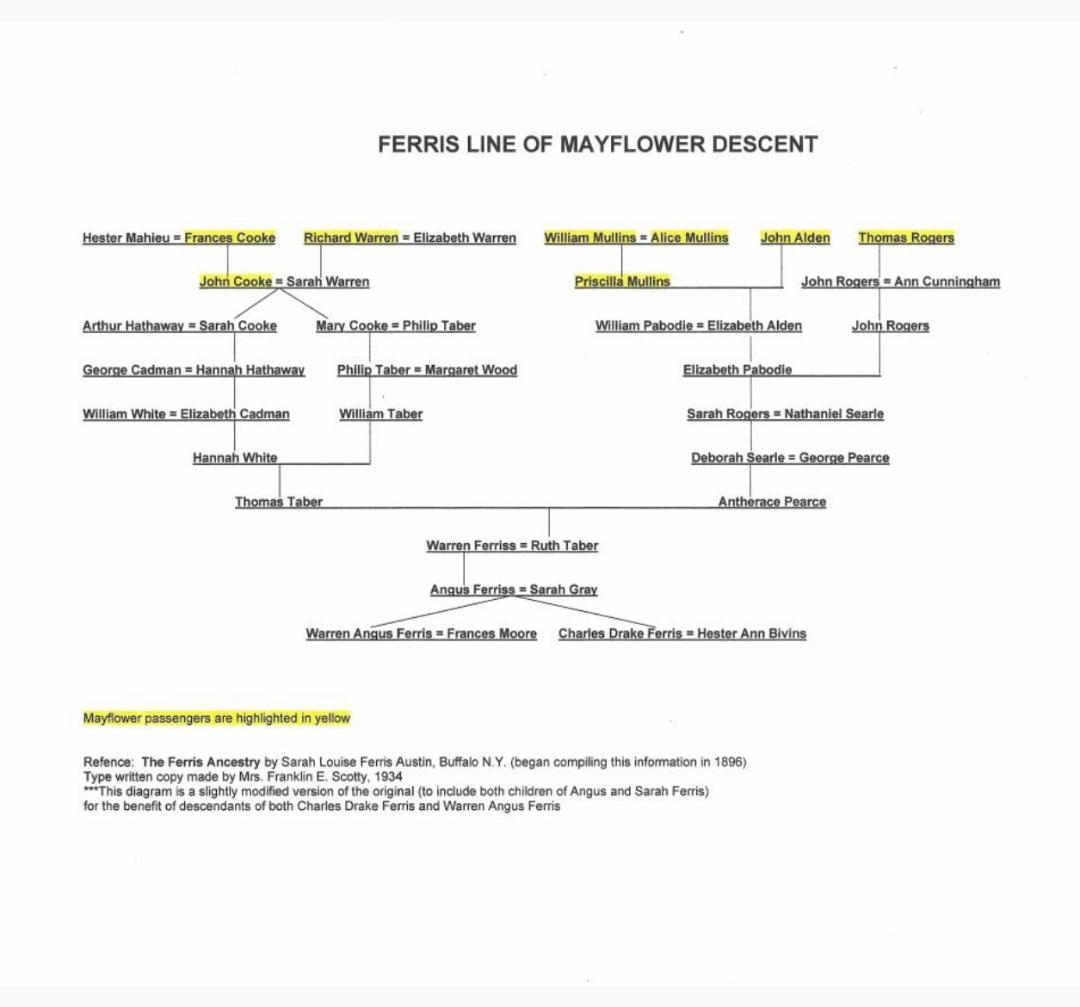
Ferris Ancestry: Mayflower line

Ferris learned to hunt, fish, and trap as a young boy. His early experiences growing up around Native Americans piqued his interest in their culture. He observed their celebrations and interactions. In his youth, Ferris also saw the completion of the Erie Canal, which was finished in 1825. This proximity to Native American culture and the accessibility to travel inspired Ferris's spirit of adventure and prompted him to move out west.

=== American Fur Company ===
Ferris left Buffalo and got a job in Pittsburgh working for a merchant. He only held this job for three months before the merchant went out of business. He later found other employment in Cincinnati selling magazine subscriptions for the Western Tiller. He became restless reading about the west and wanted to see it for himself. He moved to St. Louis and opened a "mathematical and English school" in his home to pay for rent. The school was subscription based, so his income was determined by the number of students who attended. Ferris managed to attract some students during his first term teaching, but closed the school because parents did not pay him tuition fees due to his bad temper.

In 1829, however, he joined the American Fur Company as one of 45 Americans and Canadians who would explore the Rocky Mountains. Ferris left on his first expedition with the company in 1830; the company lasted five years and included mapping Yellowstone. The expedition left from St. Louis and made their way following the Platte River. The group divided into smaller groups in order to more efficiently survey the land. Ferris was sent to Cache Valley, and located settlers there in November. By December, his group had set up a winter camp in Salt Lake City. The group was informed by local Native Americans of the Snake River country. In April 1831, they decided to explore the area. During the expedition, Ferris came in contact and maintained cordial relations with the Salish, who Ferris and other Europeans called Flathead Indians. The Salish accompanied Ferris on some of his excursions. In May 1832 he traveled to Pierre's Hole to rendezvous with the entire crew of the expedition. He chose to spend the winter of 1834 with the Salish. In October 1835, Ferris returned home.

He kept a journal of his travels which were later published as the book Life in the Rocky Mountains (1940). On one trip in 1834, Ferris acted as a clerk for the American Fur Company in a trapping party to the mountains of western Wyoming. Out of curiosity, Ferris found Native American guides and made a side journey into what is today Yellowstone National Park. In his journal Ferris gave one of the first descriptions of the geysers of the Yellowstone region.

From the surface of a rocky plain or table, burst forth columns of water of various dimensions, projected high in the air, accompanied by loud explosions, and sulphurous vapors, which were highly disagreeable to the smell. ...The largest of these wonderful fountains, projects a column of boiling water several feet in diameter, to the height of more than one hundred and fifty feet. ...These explosions and discharges occur at intervals of about two hours....

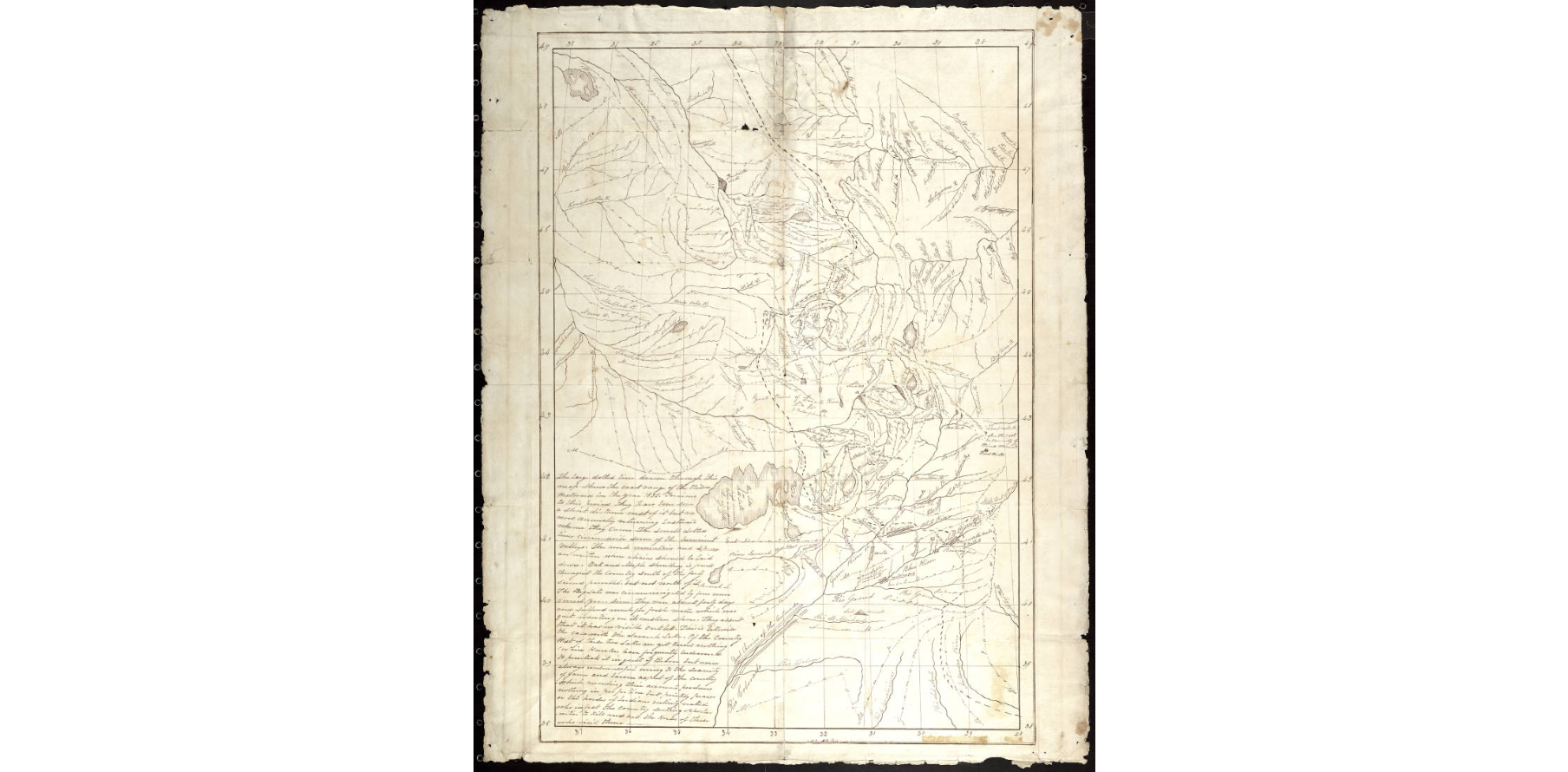
Warren's map of the Northwest fur country

When Ferris returned to Buffalo, he found that while he had been away, his brother Charles had taken care of the family. When Ferris came back, however, Charles left the family in financial crisis, and Ferris was forced to remain in Buffalo to take care of them. Their half-brother Joshua issued a lawsuit against Charles, and while waiting for case to be settled, he devoted his time to writing his journal. Ferris also drew his "Map of the Northwest Fur Country" which was written to be published along with his journal. Charles went off to fight in Texas, and when he returned in 1836, he claimed to have 5,400 acres of land there. Ferris decided to accompany his brother to Texas in the hopes of earning a fortune; this left Joshua in charge of family affairs in January 1837. The brothers settled the financial debts later that year, although they continued to have disputes over money throughout their lives.

=== Surveyor in Texas ===
Ferris intended to join the army in Texas since the government was giving land grants to veterans and settlers, but Ferris never received a commission. He and his brother decided to take up surveying in Texas, although they had no formal training. They purchased the materials and books in order to train themselves. Ferris became ill, and Charles went out to survey, leaving him alone to recover. After recovering, Ferris successfully joined a militia expedition against Native Americans in September 1837.

Ferris became the official surveyor for Nacogdoches County in late 1837, a position that gave him social status and financial security. While serving in this position, Ferris enlisted in military service again during the Córdova Rebellion in 1838. In 1839 Ferris surveyed at the Three Forks of the Trinity River, deciding the lines and direction of streets for today's Dallas County. Ferris entered and surveyed this land prior to John Neely Bryan, the commonly accepted founder of Dallas. Ferris followed the direction of streams and rivers in Dallas, and, therefore, the streets run northeast to southwest instead of north-south and east-west. He invited Joshua Lovejoy (who changed his name to Clarence) to come to Texas and survey with him. They made arrangements to divide the land they received equally. Lovejoy arrived and helped Ferris survey in 1841, but was disappointed that he did not receive all the goods and riches that he expected. This caused fighting and betrayal in their relationship, which lasted throughout their lifetime.

Ferris left Nacogdoches County and moved to Crockett, where he was elected to represent Houston County in the Texas Congress. After grieving the death of his wife Melinda, Ferris settled on 640 acres of land in Dallas in 1845. This land would later become Forest Hills, and part of it became a cemetery. The first records of Ferris using the northwest corner of his homestead as a cemetery are from 1847, and the last records are from 1906.

Ferris was called upon to resurvey the Dallas area in 1850. He finished surveying the 30 square miles in just 10 days despite unfavorable weather conditions. This was his last large surveying job. Throughout the 1850s Ferris practiced farming. He was one of the first citizens to try growing cotton in Dallas. By 1860, Ferris no longer identified himself as a surveyor, but a farmer. In the aftermath of the American Civil War, Ferris sold some of his land to pay for debts. In his later life, Ferris wrote articles for a local newspaper. He had a series of over twenty articles published between 1871 and 1872.

=== Personal life ===
Ferris married Melinda G. Cook in April 1842. After Melinda's death in 1844, Ferris was determined to fulfill her dying wish, that he find another wife to raise her children. The next year Ferris courted Angeline Cook, Melinda's cousin, but she broke off their engagement due to her family's lack of approval. He was married to Frances "Fanny" Moore in 1847. Ferris was the father of 12 children. Frances died in childbirth in 1869, leaving Ferris to raise their young children. He sympathized with the Democratic Party and the Confederacy during the U.S. Civil War. He died on 8 February 1873 and is buried in the Forest Hills area of Dallas, Texas.

Throughout his life he had disputes with his half-brother Joshua Lovejoy. He maintained correspondence with his family in Buffalo, New York, when he moved to Texas.

== Podcast and Blog ==
On February 8, 2025, Jim Cornelius of Frontier Partisans released a podcast entitled "Warren Angus Ferris - Man of the Mountain Land". The podcast features the journal of Warren Angus Ferris entitled "Life in the Rocky Mountains" which includes poetic descriptions of Ferris' explorations, landscapes, wildlife, and the Native American cultures he encountered. Cornelius discusses Ferris' early life in New York, his fur-trapping career, and his later life in what is now Dallas County in Texas. Cornelius eloquently reads excerpts from the journal as well as provides a historian's reflection of the era and important events throughout the podcast.

A more detailed story of Warren Angus Ferris and his family is discussed on the Warren Angus Ferris Ancestry blog. https://ferrisancestry.blog/
