= 2008 Big 12 Conference women's basketball tournament =

- Classification: Division I
- Teams: 12
- Site: Municipal Auditorium; Kansas City, Missouri
- Champions: Texas A&M (1st title)
- Winning coach: Gary Blair (1st title)
- MVP: Takia Starks (Texas A&M)
- Attendance: 24,190 (overall); 4,420 (championship)
- Television: Metro Sports, FSN

2007–08 Big 12 Conference women's basketball standings
	Conf.				Overall
Team	W		L	PCT	W		L	PCT
No. 16 Kansas State	13	–	3	.813	22	–	10	.688
No. 12 Baylor	12	–	4	.750	25	–	7	.781
No. 13 Oklahoma State	11	–	5	.688	27	–	8	.771
No. 8 Texas A&M †	11	–	5	.688	29	–	8	.784
No. 14 Oklahoma	11	–	5	.688	22	–	9	.710
Nebraska	9	–	7	.563	21	–	12	.636
Texas	7	–	9	.438	22	–	13	.629
Iowa State	7	–	9	.438	21	–	13	.618
Colorado	5	–	11	.313	19	–	15	.559
Texas Tech	4	–	12	.250	17	–	16	.515
Kansas	4	–	12	.250	17	–	16	.515
Missouri	2	–	14	.125	10	–	21	.323
† 2008 Big 12 Tournament winner Rankings from AP poll

The 2008 Big 12 Conference women's basketball championship, known for sponsorship reasons as the 2008 Phillips 66 Big 12 Women's Basketball Championship, is the 2008 edition of the Big 12 Conference's championship tournament. The tournament was held at the Municipal Auditorium in Kansas City, Missouri between March 11–13 and on March 15, 2008. Texas A&M University won their first Big 12 Conference women's basketball tournament championship beating Oklahoma State University, 64–59.

Kansas City-based Metro Sports televised the first round of the tournament while Fox Sports Net televised the second, semifinal, and final round of the tournament.

== Seeding ==
2008 Big 12 Conference women's basketball tournament seeds
Seed	School	Conf.	Over.	Tiebreaker
1	Kansas State ‡#	13–3	22–10	
2	Baylor #	12–4	25–7	
3	Oklahoma State #	11–5	27–8	
4	Texas A&M #	11–5	29–8	
5	Oklahoma	11–5	22–9	
6	Nebraska	9–7	21–12	
7	Texas	7–9	22–13	
8	Iowa State	7–9	21–13	
9	Colorado	5–11	19–15	
10	Texas Tech	4–12	17–16	
11	Kansas	4–12	17–16	
12	Missouri	2–14	10–21	
‡ – Big 12 Conference regular season champions, and tournament No. 1 seed. # – Received a single-bye in the conference tournament. Overall records include all games played in the Big 12 Conference tournament.

== Schedule ==
Session	Game	Time	Matchup	Television	Attendance
First Round – Tuesday, March 11
1	1	12:00 pm	#8 Iowa State 76 vs #9 Colorado 50	Metro Sports	3,344
1	2	2:30 pm	#12 Missouri 70 vs #5 Oklahoma 64 ^{OT}	Metro Sports	3,344
2	3	6:00 pm	#7 Texas 75 vs #10 Texas Tech 63	Metro Sports	3,974
2	4	8:30 pm	#11 Kansas 73 vs #6 Nebraska 67	Metro Sports	3,974
Quarterfinals – Wednesday, March 12
3	5	12:00 pm	#8 Iowa State 66 vs #1 Kansas State 65 ^{OT}	FSN	4,326
3	6	2:30 pm	#4 Texas A&M 65 vs #12 Missouri 39	FSN	4,326
4	7	6:00 pm	#7 Texas 76 vs #2 Baylor 61	FSN	3,363
4	8	8:30 pm	#3 Oklahoma State 82 vs #11 Kansas 62	FSN	3,363
Semifinals – Thursday, March 13
5	9	6:00 pm	#4 Texas A&M 65 vs #8 Iowa State 53	FSN	4,763
5	10	8:30 pm	#3 Oklahoma State 75 vs #7 Texas 72	FSN	4,763
Final – Saturday, March 15
6	11	6:00 pm	#4 Texas A&M 64 vs #3 Oklahoma State 59	FSN	4,420
Game times in CT. #-Rankings denote tournament seed

== Tournament bracket ==
First Round (March 11)
8	Iowa State	76
9	Colorado	50
5	Oklahoma	64
12	Missouri (OT)	70
7	Texas	75
10	Texas Tech	63
6	Nebraska	67
11	Kansas	72

Second Round (March 12)
1	Kansas State	65
8	Iowa State (OT)	66
4	Texas A&M	65
12	Missouri	39
2	Baylor	61
7	Texas	76
3	Oklahoma State	82
11	Kansas	62

Semifinals (March 13)
8	Iowa State	53
4	Texas A&M	65
7	Texas	72
3	Oklahoma State	75

Finals (March 15)
4	Texas A&M	64
3	Oklahoma State	59

== All-Tournament Team ==
Most Outstanding Player – Takia Starks, Texas A&M

Player	Team
Takia Starks	Texas A&M
Heather Ezell	Iowa State
Andrea Riley	Oklahoma State
Danielle Green	Oklahoma State
A’Quonesia Franklin	Texas A&M

== See also ==
- 2008 Big 12 Conference men's basketball tournament
- 2008 NCAA Women's Division I Basketball Tournament
- 2007–08 NCAA Division I women's basketball rankings
