= Takia Starks =

American basketball player

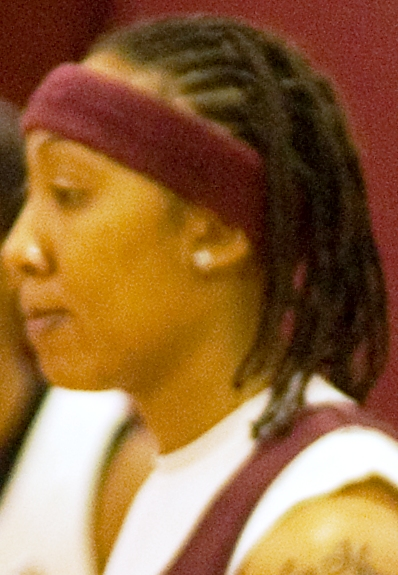
- Starks at Texas A&M

Personal information
- Born: January 16, 1986 (age 40) Houston, Texas, U.S.
- Listed height: 1.73 m (5 ft 8 in)

Career information
- High school: Westfield (Houston, Texas)
- College: Texas A&M (2005–2009)
- Playing career: 2009–present
- Position: Guard

Career highlights
- Big 12 Tournament Most Outstanding Player (2008)

Takia Nicole Starks (born January 16, 1986) is a shooting guard. She formerly played for the Perth Lynx of the Women's National Basketball League. Born in Houston, Texas, she played college basketball at Texas A&M. Starks became AMM all-time leading scorer during her career, scoring 1977 points. She is currently second on the all-time scoring list for the school.

== College honors and awards ==
- 2008 Timeout 4 HIV/AIDS Tournament MVP
- 2008 Preseason All-Big 12 team
- 2008–09 Preseason Sporting News First Team All-America
- 2008 Associated Press All-America Honorable Mention
- 2008 State Farm/WBCA All-America Finalist
- 2008 State Farm/WBCA All-Region Team
- 2008 NCAA Oklahoma City Regional All-Tournament Team
- 2008 John R. Wooden Award Candidate
- 2008 Naismith Trophy Award Candidate
- 2008 Big 12 Tournament Most Outstanding Player
- 2008 Big 12 All-Tournament Team
- 2008 All-Big 12 First Team by the league's coaches
- 2008 All-Big 12 First Team by The Dallas Morning News
- 2008 All-Big 12 Second Team by the Waco Tribune-Herald
- 2007 Paradise Jam St. John Division All-Tournament Team
- The 19th all-time player to reach 1,000 career points at A&M
- 2007 All-Big 12 First Team by the league's coaches
- 2007 All-Big 12 First Team by The Dallas Morning News
- 2007 All-Big 12 First Team by the Waco Tribune-Herald
- Big 12 Player of the Week (1/15/07)
- 2006 National All-Freshman Team by Women's Basketball News Service
- 2006 Big 12 All-Rookie Team by the league's coaches
- 2006 Big 12 All-Newcomer Team by Dallas Morning News
- 2006 Big 12 All-Freshman Team by Kansas City Star
- 2006 Big 12 All-Freshman Team by Waco Tribune-Herald
- 2005 Duel in the Desert Classic All-Tournament Team
- Big 12 Rookie of the Week (12/19/05)
- Big 12 Rookie of the Week (12/5/05)

=== Texas A&M statistics ===
Ratios
Year	Team	GP	FG%	3P%	FT%	RBG	APG	BPG	SPG	PPG
2005-06	Texas A&M	32	41.3%	33.0%	75.8%	2.84	2.41	0.03	1.13	11.94
2006-07	Texas A&M	32	39.6%	38.2%	68.0%	4.22	2.03	0.19	1.25	14.19
2007-08	Texas A&M	36	42.2%	35.9%	67.4%	4.33	1.50	0.39	1.31	16.31
2008-09	Texas A&M	35	40.5%	29.4%	76.4%	4.29	1.49	0.23	1.60	15.83
Career		135	40.9%	34.4%	71.9%	3.94	1.84	0.21	1.33	14.64

Totals
Year	Team	GP	FG	FGA	3P	3PA	FT	FTA	REB	A	BK	ST	PTS
2005-06	Texas A&M	32	163	395	31	94	25	33	91	77	1	36	382
2006-07	Texas A&M	32	178	449	47	123	51	75	135	65	6	40	454
2007-08	Texas A&M	36	231	548	65	181	60	89	156	54	14	47	587
2008-09	Texas A&M	35	211	521	35	119	97	127	150	52	8	56	554
Career		135	783	1913	178	517	233	324	532	248	29	179	1977

== Professional career ==
Starks signed with the Perth Lynx on July 30, 2009.

== Personal ==
Starks' father died of cancer on August 13, 2009, two weeks after she signed with the Perth Lynx. Her mom is a U.S. Army reservist and military police officer. Starks is the cousin of former NBA player John Starks.
