= Texas A&M Aggies women's basketball =

| 2025–26 Texas A&M Aggies women's basketball team |
- University: Texas A&M University
- Head coach: Joni Taylor (4th season)
- Location: College Station, Texas
- Arena: Reed Arena (capacity: 12,989)
- Conference: SEC
- Nickname: Aggies
- Colors: Maroon and white

NCAA Division I tournament champions
- 2011
Other NCAA Division I tournament results
| Final Four | 2011 |
| Elite Eight | 2008, 2011, 2014 |
| Sweet Sixteen | 1994, 2008, 2009, 2011, 2012, 2014, 2018, 2019, 2021 |
| Appearances | 1994, 1996, 2006, 2007, 2008, 2009, 2010, 2011, 2012, 2013, 2014, 2015, 2016, 2017, 2018, 2019, 2021, 2024 |

Conference tournament champions
- SWC: 1996; Big 12: 2008, 2010; SEC: 2013

Conference regular-season champions
- Big 12: 2007; SEC: 2021

Uniforms
| Home | Away |

The Texas A&M Aggies women's basketball team represents Texas A&M University (TAMU) in NCAA Division I women's basketball. The team is coached by Joni Taylor, entering her third season; she replaced Gary Blair, who retired after 37 years as a collegiate head coach, 19 of which were with TAMU. The Aggies play home games at Reed Arena, a 12,989-capacity arena in College Station, Texas on the campus of Texas A&M.

The Aggies were the 2011 NCAA Division I national champions. They beat the Notre Dame Fighting Irish 76–70. They have appeared in the NCAA tournament 18 times and garnered five conference championships.

== History ==
Women's basketball at Texas A&M debuted in the 1974–75 season. The program did not reach the postseason tournament until 1994 when it went to the Sweet Sixteen of the NCAA tournament. In 1995, they won the WNIT championship. In 1996, they were the SWC Champions and went to the First Round of the NCAA tournament. Since then, the team had not achieved much notable postseason success until the hiring of Gary Blair before the 2003–04 season. In the 2004–05 season, Blair took his team to the WNIT quarterfinals. In the 2005–06 season, the team advanced to the NCAA first round. In the 2006–07 season, the team won the Big 12 regular season championship and advanced to the NCAA second round. The 2007–08 team finished 8th in the AP Poll, the highest in team history. It also received the highest seed in the NCAA tournament out of all five appearances and finished in the Elite Eight. On March 29, 2011, Texas A&M defeated Baylor to advance to the program's first-ever Final Four appearance.

In the Final Four, the Aggies defeated Stanford 63–62 and Notre Dame 76–70 to win their first national championship. Gary Blair became the first male coach other than Connecticut's Geno Auriemma to win a women's basketball national championship since Leon Barmore led Louisiana Tech to the 1988 championship.

== Notable former players ==
| Name | Career at Texas A&M | Notability | Year drafted by WNBA | Reference |
|---|---|---|---|---|
| Kelly Krauskopf | 1980–83 | Former chief operation officer, general manager, and president for the Indiana Fever; assistant general manager for the Indiana Pacers | N/A | |
| Andrea Williams | 1993-94 | Commissioner of Big Sky Conference, COO of College Football Playoff | | |
| Jaynetta Saunders | 1999–01 | Former WNBA player for Phoenix Mercury | 2001 | |
| Toccara Williams | 2000–04 | Former WNBA player for San Antonio Stars | 2004 | |
| Morenike Atunrase | 2004–08 | Former WNBA player for the San Antonio Stars | 2008 | |
| A'Quonesia Franklin | 2004–08 | Former WNBA player for the Sacramento Monarchs | 2008 | |
| Danielle Gant | 2005–09 | Ranks in the top 10 of many categories | 2009 | |
| Takia Starks | 2005–09 | All-time leading scorer in A&M history, when she graduated, now second overall | N/A | |
| Sydney Colson | 2007–11 | Ranks in top 10 in career assist; Former WNBA player for the New York Liberty | 2011 | |
| Danielle Adams | 2009–11 | First first-team All-American in program's history; Former WNBA player for the San Antonio Stars | 2011 | |
| N'dea Jones | 2017–21 | Jones became Texas A&M's all-time leader in rebounds and double-doubles. She received All-SEC honors and an AP All-American honorable mention her senior year. She was also honored by the U.S. Basketball Writers Association and Women's Basketball Coaches Association (WBCA) All-America team, becoming the fourth Texas A&M player to be named to all three, including AP honors, in one season. | 2021 | |

== Player awards ==
=== National Awards ===
- NCAA basketball tournament Most Outstanding Player

Danielle Adams – 2011

== 2021–22 roster ==
2021–22 Texas A&M Aggies women's basketball team
Players
Coaches

| Pos. | # | Name | Height | Year | Previous school | Hometown |
|---|---|---|---|---|---|---|
| G | 2 | Qadashah Hoppie | 5 ft 9 in (1.75 m) | Sr | St. John's University | Staten Island, NY |
| G | 3 | Destiny Pitts | 5 ft 10 in (1.78 m) | Sr | Minnesota | Detroit, MI |
| G | 4 | Kay Kay Green | 5 ft 6 in (1.68 m) | So | Whitney M. Young Magnet HS | Chicago, IL |
| G | 5 | Jordan Nixon | 5 ft 3 in (1.6 m) | Jr | Notre Dame | New York City, NY |
| G | 11 | Kayla Wells | 6 ft 0 in (1.83 m) | Sr | South Grand Prairie HS | Dallas, TX |
| F | 13 | Jada Malone | 6 ft 3 in (1.91 m) | Fr | The Village School | Spring, TX |
| F | 14 | Maliyah Johnson | 6 ft 2 in (1.88 m) | So | Summer Creek HS | Chicago, IL |
| G | 21 | Eriny Kindred | 6 ft 2 in (1.88 m) | Fr | Del Valle HS | Del Valle, TX |
| C | 22 | Kenyal Perry | 5 ft 6 in (1.68 m) | So | McKinley HS | New Orleans, LA |
| G | 23 | Mckinzie Green | 5 ft 6 in (1.68 m) | Jr | Manvel HS | Manvel, TX |
| G | 24 | Sahara Jones | 6 ft 0 in (1.83 m) | So | Veterans Memorial HS | San Antonio, TX |
| F | 32 | Aaliyah Patty | 6 ft 3 in (1.91 m) | Sr | Ohio State University | Chester, IL |
| C | 44 | Sydnee Roby | 6 ft 3 in (1.91 m) | Jr | University of Miami | Milwaukee, WI |

Head coach

- Gary Blair (Texas Tech)

Assistant coach(es)

- Kelly Bond-White (Illinois)
- Vernette Skeete (Alcorn State)
- Greg Brown (Lipscomb)

Legend

- (C) Team captain
- (S) Suspended
- (I) Ineligible
- (W) Walk-on
- Injured
- Current redshirt

Roster
Last update: September 12, 2021

== Season-by-season results ==
Statistics overview
| Season | Coach | Overall | Conference | Standing | Postseason |
|---|---|---|---|---|---|
Kay Don (1974–1977)
| 1974–1975 | Kay Don | 24–9 | — | — | — |
| 1975–1976 | Kay Don | 18–11 | — | — | — |
| 1976–1977 | Kay Don | 14–17 | — | — | — |
| Kay Don: | | 56–37 | — | | |
Wanda Bender (1977–1979)
| 1977–1978 | Wanda Bender | 19–18 | — | — | — |
| 1978–1979 | Wanda Bender | 26–18 | — | — | — |
| Wanda Bender: | | 45–36 | — | | |
Cherri Rap (1979–1984)
| 1979–1980 | Cherri Rap | 19–12 | — | — | — |
| 1980–1981 | Cherri Rap | 7–22 | — | — | — |
| 1981–1982† | Cherri Rap | 9–20 | — | — | — |
| 1982–1983‡ | Cherri Rap | 11–16 | 2–6 | 7th | — |
| 1983–1984 | Cherri Rap | 13–15 | 6–10 | 6th | — |
| Cherri Rap: | | 59–85 | 8–16 | † 1982: Inaugural year of NCAA tournament; final year for AIAW tournament ‡ A&M starts Southwest Conference play | |
Lynn Hickey (1984–1994)
| 1984–1985 | Lynn Hickey | 14–14 | 7–9 | T–5th | — |
| 1985–1986 | Lynn Hickey | 16–13 | 9–7 | T–4th | — |
| 1986–1987 | Lynn Hickey | 9–17 | 5–11 | T–6th | — |
| 1987–1988 | Lynn Hickey | 16–13 | 9–7 | T–4th | — |
| 1988–1989 | Lynn Hickey | 17–12 | 8–8 | 5th | — |
| 1989–1990 | Lynn Hickey | 16–12 | 8–8 | T–5th | — |
| 1990–1991 | Lynn Hickey | 14–14 | 8–8 | 5th | — |
| 1991–1992 | Lynn Hickey | 15–13 | 7–7 | T–4th | — |
| 1992–1993 | Lynn Hickey | 15–12 | 7–7 | 4th | — |
| 1993–1994 | Lynn Hickey | 23–8 | 11–3 | 2nd | NCAA Sweet Sixteen |
| Lynn Hickey: | | 155–128 | 79–75 | | |
Candi Harvey (1994–1998)
| 1994–1995 | Candi Harvey | 21–9 | 9–5 | T–2nd | WNIT Champions |
| 1995–1996 | Candi Harvey | 20–12 | 8–5 | 4th | NCAA first round |
| 1996–1997# | Candi Harvey | 9–18 | 3–13 | T–10th | — |
| 1997–1998 | Candi Harvey | 9–19 | 4–12 | T–9th | — |
| Candi Harvey: | | 59–58 | 24–35 | # A&M leaves SWC; starts Big 12 play. | |
Peggie Gillom (1998–2003)
| 1998–1999 | Peggie Gillom | 7–20 | 2–14 | 12th | — |
| 1999–2000 | Peggie Gillom | 11–16 | 3–13 | 11th | — |
| 2000–2001 | Peggie Gillom | 12–16 | 2–14 | 12th | — |
| 2001–2002 | Peggie Gillom | 13–16 | 5–11 | 9th | — |
| 2002–2003 | Peggie Gillom | 10–18 | 3–13 | T–9th | — |
| Peggie Gillom: | | 53–86 | 15–65 | | |
Gary Blair (2003–2022)
| 2003–2004 | Gary Blair | 9–19 | 2–14 | T–11th | — |
| 2004–2005 | Gary Blair | 16–15 | 4–12 | T–9th | WNIT Quarterfinals |
| 2005–2006 | Gary Blair | 23–9 | 11–5 | 3rd | NCAA first round |
| 2006–2007 | Gary Blair | 25–7 | 13–3 | T–1st | NCAA second round |
| 2007–2008 | Gary Blair | 29–8 | 11–5 | T–3rd | NCAA Elite Eight |
| 2008–2009 | Gary Blair | 27–8 | 11–5 | T–3rd | NCAA Sweet Sixteen |
| 2009–2010 | Gary Blair | 26–8 | 10–6 | T–4th | NCAA second round |
| 2010–2011 | Gary Blair | 33–5 | 13–3 | 2nd | NCAA Champions |
| 2011–2012 | Gary Blair | 24–11 | 11–7 | 3rd | NCAA Sweet Sixteen |
| 2012–2013* | Gary Blair | 25–10 | 11–5 | 4th | NCAA second round |
| 2013–2014 | Gary Blair | 27–9 | 13–3 | T-2nd | NCAA Elite Eight |
| 2014–2015 | Gary Blair | 23–10 | 10–6 | T-4th | NCAA first round |
| 2015–2016 | Gary Blair | 22–10 | 11–5 | T-2nd | NCAA second round |
| 2016–2017 | Gary Blair | 22–12 | 9–7 | 6th | NCAA second round |
| 2017–2018 | Gary Blair | 26–10 | 11–5 | T-4th | NCAA Sweet Sixteen |
| 2018-2019 | Gary Blair | 26-8 | 12-4 | 3rd | NCAA Sweet Sixteen |
| 2019-2020 | Gary Blair | 22-8 | 10-6 | 4th | Cancelled Due To Covid |
| 2020-2021 | Gary Blair | 25-3 | 13-1 | 1st | NCAA Sweet Sixteen |
| 2021-2022 | Gary Blair | 14-15 | 4-12 | 12th | |
| Gary Blair: | | 443–241 | 189-112 | * A&M leaves Big 12; starts Southeastern Conference play. | |
Joni Taylor (2022–present)
| 2022–2023 | Joni Taylor | 9-20 | 2–14 | 13th | |
| 2023–2024 | Joni Taylor | 19-13 | 6–10 | T-9th | NCAA First Round |
| 2024–2025 | Joni Taylor | 10-18 | 3–13 | T-13th | |
| Joni Taylor: | | 38-51 | 11–37 | | |
| Total: | | 907–726 | | | |
National champion Postseason invitational champion Conference regular season champion Conference regular season and conference tournament champion Division regular season champion Division regular season and conference tournament champion Conference tournament champion

== NCAA tournament results ==
Texas A&M has appeared in the NCAA Division I women's basketball tournament eighteen times. They have a record of 29–17.

| Year | Seed | Round | Opponent | Result |
|---|---|---|---|---|
| 1994 | #13 | First Round; Second Round; Sweet Sixteen | #4 Florida #5 San Diego State #1 Purdue | W 78-76; W 75-72; L 65-82 |
| 1996 | #7 | First Round | #10 Kent State | L 68-72 |
| 2006 | #6 | First Round | #11 TCU | L 65-69 |
| 2007 | #4 | First Round; Second Round | #13 Texas-Arlington #5 George Washington | W 58-50; L 47-59 |
| 2008 | #2 | First Round; Second Round; Sweet Sixteen; Elite Eight | #15 UTSA #10 Hartford #3 Duke #1 Tennessee | W 91-52; W 63-39; W 77-63; L 45-53 |
| 2009 | #2 | First Round; Second Round; Sweet Sixteen | #15 Evansville #10 Minnesota #6 Arizona State | W 80-45; W 73-42; L 69-84 |
| 2010 | #2 | First Round; Second Round | #15 Portland State #7 Gonzaga | W 84-53; L 71-72 |
| 2011 | #2 | First Round; Second Round; Sweet Sixteen; Elite Eight; Final Four; Title Game | #15 McNeese State #7 Rutgers #6 Georgia #1 Baylor #1 Stanford #2 Notre Dame | W 87-47; W 70-48; W 79-38; W 58-46; W 63-62; W 76-70 |
| 2012 | #3 | First Round; Second Round; Sweet Sixteen | #14 Albany #6 Arkansas #2 Maryland | W 69-47; W 61-59; L 74-81 |
| 2013 | #3 | First Round; Second Round | #14 Wichita State #6 Nebraska | W 71-45; L 63-74 |
| 2014 | #3 | First Round; Second Round; Sweet Sixteen; Elite Eight | #14 North Dakota #11 James Madison #7 DePaul #1 Connecticut | W 70-55; W 85-69; W 84-65; L 54-69 |
| 2015 | #6 | First Round | #11 Little Rock | L 60-69 |
| 2016 | #4 | First Round; Second Round | #13 Missouri State #5 Florida State | W 74-65; L 56-74 |
| 2017 | #5 | First Round; Second Round | #12 Penn #4 UCLA | W 63-61; L 43-75 |
| 2018 | #4 | First Round; Second Round; Sweet Sixteen | #13 Drake #5 DePaul #1 Notre Dame | W 89-76; W 80-79; L 84-90 |
| 2019 | #4 | First Round; Second Round; Sweet Sixteen | #13 Wright State #5 Marquette #1 Notre Dame | W 84-61; W 78-76; L 80-87 |
| 2021 | #2 | First Round; Second Round; Sweet Sixteen | #15 Troy #7 Iowa State #3 Arizona | W 84-80; W 84-82 (OT); L 59-74 |
| 2024 | #11 | First Round | #6 Nebraska | L 59-61 |

== See also ==
- Texas A&M Aggies men's basketball
