= Forest Hills, Dallas =

Neighborhood in Dallas, Texas, USA

Forest Hills
- Neighborhood
- Location within DFW Location within Texas Location within the United States
- Coordinates: 32°48′42.3″N 96°42′55.17″W
- Country: United States
- State: Texas
- County: Dallas
- City: Dallas
- Area: East Dallas
- ZIP code: 75218
- Area codes: 214, 469, 972
- Website: Official website

Forest Hills is a neighborhood in east Dallas, Texas (USA). It is located near White Rock Lake. that borders Little Forest Hills

== Boundaries ==
Forest Hills is a neighborhood surrounding Forest Hills Boulevard. It lies directly south of White Rock Lake with many grand homes fronting Garland Road. The area is west of Lakeland Dr, east of Highland Rd, north of the railroad tracks, and south of Garland Rd/ White Rock Lake.

== Education ==
The neighborhood is served by the Dallas Independent School District. Children in the neighborhood attend Alex Sanger Elementary School (located within the neighborhood), W. H. Gaston Middle School, Skyline High School and Bryan Adams High School.
