= 2012–13 West Coast Conference women's basketball season =

2012–13 West Coast Conference Women's basketball season
- League: NCAA Division I
- Sport: Basketball
- Teams: 9
- TV partner(s): (national) ESPNU, BYUtv, SWX

Regular season
- Season champions: Gonzaga
- Runners-up: San Diego
- Season MVP: Taelor Karr, Gonzaga

Tournament
- Champions: Gonzaga
- Runners-up: San Diego
- Finals MVP: Haiden Palmer, Gonzaga

Basketball seasons
- ← 11–12 13–14 →

2012–13 West Coast Conference Women's basketball standings
	Conf.				Overall
Team	W		L	PCT	W		L	PCT
Gonzaga†	15	–	1	.938	27	–	6	.818
San Diego	12	–	4	.750	22	–	10	.688
Saint Mary's	11	–	5	.688	23	–	10	.697
BYU	11	–	5	.688	23	–	11	.676
Loyola Marymount	6	–	10	.375	13	–	18	.419
Santa Clara	6	–	10	.375	14	–	16	.467
Portland	5	–	11	.313	11	–	20	.355
San Francisco	4	–	12	.250	12	–	19	.387
Pepperdine	2	–	14	.125	5	–	23	.179
† 2013 West Coast Conference women's basketball tournament winner As of March 27, 2013; Rankings from AP Poll

The 2012–13 West Coast Conference women's basketball season began with practices in October 2012 and ended with the 2013 West Coast Conference women's basketball tournament at the Orleans Arena March 6–11, 2013 in Las Vegas. The regular season began in November, with the conference schedule starting at the end of December.

This season was the 28th for WCC women's basketball, which began in the 1985–86 season when the league was known as the West Coast Athletic Conference (WCAC). It was also the 23rd season under the West Coast Conference name (the conference began as the California Basketball Association in 1952, became the WCAC in 1956, and dropped the word "Athletic" in 1989). After having no changes from 1980 until 2011, the conference will have its second change in three years in 2013. Original conference founder, and a fellow faith-based, private school Pacific will rejoin the conference. Pacific will come from the Big West.

== Pre-season ==
- Pre-season media day took place at the same time the men's media day did. However the women's media day was toned down quite a bit. No interviews or TV announcements took place. Instead they only announced the pre-season picks and pre-season teams.

=== 2012–13 West Coast Women's Basketball Media Poll ===
Rank, School (first-place votes), Points
1. BYU (5), 61
2. Gonzaga (4), 60
3. Saint Mary's, 48
4. San Diego, 36
5. Pepperdine, 33
6. Santa Clara, 27
7. Loyola Marymount, 25
8. Portland, 24
9. San Francisco, 10

=== 2012–13 West Coast Women's Preseason All-West Conference Team ===
Player, School, Yr., Pos.
Alex Cowling, Loyola Marymount, RS-Sr., G/F
Lexi Eaton, BYU, So., G
Megan Fulps, Santa Clara, Sr., G
Jennifer Hamson, BYU, Jr., C
Amy Kame, San Diego, Jr., G
Taelor Karr, Gonzaga, Sr., G
Danielle Mauldin, Saint Mary's, Jr., F
Jackie Nared, Saint Mary's, Jr., G
Haiden Palmer, Gonzaga, Jr., G
Haley Steed, BYU, Sr., G

== Rankings ==
Legend
	Improvement in ranking
	Drop in ranking
RV	Received votes but were not ranked in Top 25 of poll

		Pre/ Wk 1	Wk 2	Wk 3	Wk 4	Wk 5	Wk 6	Wk 7	Wk 8	Wk 9	Wk 10	Wk 11	Wk 12	Wk 13	Wk 14	Wk 15	Wk 16	Wk 17	Wk 18	Wk 19	Final
BYU	AP																				
BYU	C	RV	RV																		
Gonzaga	AP	RV	RV	RV	RV		RV	RV										RV			
Gonzaga	C	RV	RV	RV	RV	RV	RV	RV	RV	RV								RV			
Loyola Marymount	AP																				
Loyola Marymount	C																				
Pepperdine	AP																				
Pepperdine	C																				
Portland	AP																				
Portland	C																				
Saint Mary's	AP																				
Saint Mary's	C																				
San Diego	AP																				
San Diego	C																				
San Francisco	AP																				
San Francisco	C																				
Santa Clara	AP																				
Santa Clara	C																				

== Conference games ==
=== Composite Matrix ===
This table summarizes the head-to-head results between teams in conference play. (x) indicates games remaining this season.

	BYU	Gonzaga	LMU	Pepperdine	Portland	Saint Mary's	San Diego	San Francisco	Santa Clara
vs. Brigham Young	–	2-0	1–1	0–2	0–2	1–1	0–2	1–1	0–2
vs. Gonzaga	0–2	–	0–2	0–2	0–2	1–1	0–2	0–2	0–2
vs. Loyola Marymount	1–1	2–0	–	0–2	2–0	2–0	2–0	0–2	1–1
vs. Pepperdine	2–0	2–0	2–0	–	2–0	1–1	2–0	1–1	2–0
vs. Portland	2–0	2–0	0–2	0–2	–	2–0	2–0	2–0	1–1
vs. Saint Mary's	1–1	1–1	0–2	1–1	0–2	–	2–0	0–2	0–2
vs. San Diego	2–0	2–0	0–2	0–2	0–2	0–2	–	0–2	0–2
vs. San Francisco	1–1	2–0	2–0	1–1	0–2	2–0	2–0	–	2–0
vs. Santa Clara	2–0	2–0	1–1	0–2	1–1	2–0	12–0	0–2	–
Total	11–5	15–1	6–10	2–14	5–11	11–5	12–4	4–12	6–10

== Conference tournament ==
- March 6–11, 2013– West Coast Conference Basketball Tournament, Orleans Arena, Las Vegas, NV.

== Head coaches ==
Jeff Judkins, BYU
Kelly Graves, Gonzaga
Charity Elliott, Loyola Marymount
Julie Rousseau, Pepperdine
Jim Sollars, Portland
Paul Thomas, Saint Mary's
Cindy Fisher, San Diego
Jennifer Azzi, San Francisco
Jennifer Mountain, Santa Clara

== Postseason ==
=== NCAA tournament ===
Seed	Bracket	School	First round	Second round	Sweet 16	Elite 8	Final Four	Championship
1	Spokane Regional	Gonzaga	#5 Iowa State; Mar. 23, Spokane; L, 60–72					
1 Bid	W-L (%):	TOTAL: 0–1 .000	0–1 .000	0–0 –	0–0 –	0–0 –	0–0 –	0–0 –

=== WNIT ===
School	First round	Second round	Third round	Quarterfinals	Semifinals	Championship
Saint Mary's	Seattle; Mar. 21, Moraga; W, 68–51	Northern Colorado; Mar. 24, Greeley; W, 68–58	BYU; Mar. 27, Provo; W, 59–55	Utah; Mar. 31, Moraga; L, 55–58		
BYU	Idaho State; Mar. 20, Provo; W, 69–54	San Diego State; Mar. 23, Provo; W, 69–58	Saint Mary's; Mar. 27, Provo; L, 55–59			
San Diego	Hawaii; Mar. 21, San Diego; W, 61–49	Utah; Mar. 25, Salt Lake City; L, 50–61				
3 Bids; W-L (%); TOTAL: 6–3 .667	3–0 1.000	2–1 .667	1–1 .500	0–1 .000	0–0 –	0–0 –

=== WBI ===
No WCC teams participated in the 2013 WBI.

== Awards and honors ==
=== WCC Player-of-the-Week ===
- Nov. 12 – Danielle Mauldin, F, St. Mary's
- Nov. 26 – Jackie Nared, G, Saint Mary's
- Dec. 10 – Haley Steed, G, BYU
- Dec. 24 – Kari Luttinen, G, Portland
- Jan. 7 – Taelor Karr, G, Gonzaga
- Jan. 21 – Haiden Palmer, G, Gonzaga
- Feb. 4 – Haiden Palmer, G, Gonzaga
- Feb. 18 – Mary Hood, F, San Diego
- Mar. 4 -
- Nov. 19 – Hazel Ramirez, G, Loyola Marymount
- Dec. 3 – Amy Kame, G, San Diego
- Dec. 17 – Kari Luttinen, G, Portland
- Dec. 31 – Jackie Nared, G, Saint Mary's
- Jan. 14 – Jackie Nared, G, Saint Mary's
- Jan. 28 – Klara Wischer, F, San Diego
- Feb. 11 – Annika Holopainen, F, Portland
- Feb. 25 – Jennifer Hamson, F, BYU

=== College Sports Madness West Coast Player of the Week ===
- Nov. 12 – Keani Albanez, G, Gonzaga
- Nov. 26 – Jackie Nared, G, Saint Mary's
- Dec. 10 – Haley Steed, G, BYU (Also ESPNW Player of the week)
- Dec. 24 – Haley Steed, G, BYU
- Jan. 7 – Shannon Mauldin, F, Saint Mary's
- Jan. 21 – Haiden Palmer, G, Gonzaga
- Feb. 4 – Haley Steed, G, BYU
- Feb. 18 – Maya Hood, F, San Diego
- Mar. 4 -
- Nov. 19 – Alex Cowling, G/F, Loyola Marymount
- Dec. 3 – Amy Kame, G, San Diego
- Dec. 17 – Kari Luttinen, G, Portland
- Dec. 31 – Jackie Nared, G, Saint Mary's
- Jan. 14 – Lindsay Leo, F, Santa Clara
- Jan. 28 – Klara Wischer, F, San Diego
- Feb. 11 – Jackie Nared, G, Saint Mary's
- Feb. 25 – Katelyn McDaniel, F, San Diego

=== Player-of-the-Month ===
- November – Amy Kame, G, San Diego
- December – Mel Khlok, G, San Francisco
- January – Taelor Karr, G, Gonzaga
- February –

=== All West Coast Conference teams ===
Voting was by conference coaches:

- Player of The Year:
- Newcomer of The Year:
- Defensive Player of The Year:
- Coach of The Year:

=== All conference ===
Name	School	Pos.	Year

=== Honorable mention ===
Name	School

=== All-Freshman ===
Name	School	Position

=== All-Academic ===
Player, School	Year	GPA	Major
Kim Parker Beeston, BYU	Junior	3.75	Health Education
Sophia Ederaine, San Diego	Sophomore	3.7	Biology
Meagan Fulps, Santa Clara	Sophomore	3.62	Communication
Sunny Greinacher, Gonzaga	Sophomore	3.33	Psychology
Jennifer Hamson, BYU	Junior	3.62	Exercise Science
Amy Kame, San Diego	Junior	3.40	Communication Studies
Kari Luttinen, Portland	Sophomore	3.51	Business
Kelsey Patrick, Pepperdine	Senior	3.82	Advertising
Alicia Scafidi, San Francisco	Sophomore	3.60	Exercise Sport Science
Ruta Zurauskyte, Santa Clara	RS-Junior	3.54	Finance

== See also ==
- 2012–13 NCAA Division I women's basketball season
- West Coast Conference women's basketball tournament
- 2012–13 West Coast Conference men's basketball season
- West Coast Conference men's basketball tournament
- 2013 West Coast Conference men's basketball tournament
