= 2012–13 Gonzaga Bulldogs women's basketball team =

Intercollegiate basketball season

2012–13 Gonzaga Bulldogs women's basketball

2012-13 WCC Regular Season & Tournament Champions

NCAA Tournament 12-Seed, 1st Round
- Conference: West Coast Conference
- Record: 27–6 (15–1 WCC)
- Head coach: Kelly Graves (13th season)
- Assistant coaches: Jodie Kaczor Berry; Lisa Fortier; Julie Shaw
- Home arena: McCarthey Athletic Center

2012–13 West Coast Conference Women's basketball standings
| | Conf. | | | | Overall |
| Team | W | | L | PCT | W | | L | PCT |
|---|---|---|---|---|---|---|---|---|
| Gonzaga† | 15 | – | 1 | .938 | 27 | – | 6 | .818 |
| San Diego | 12 | – | 4 | .750 | 22 | – | 10 | .688 |
| Saint Mary's | 11 | – | 5 | .688 | 23 | – | 10 | .697 |
| BYU | 11 | – | 5 | .688 | 23 | – | 11 | .676 |
| Loyola Marymount | 6 | – | 10 | .375 | 13 | – | 18 | .419 |
| Santa Clara | 6 | – | 10 | .375 | 14 | – | 16 | .467 |
| Portland | 5 | – | 11 | .313 | 11 | – | 20 | .355 |
| San Francisco | 4 | – | 12 | .250 | 12 | – | 19 | .387 |
| Pepperdine | 2 | – | 14 | .125 | 5 | – | 23 | .179 |
† 2013 West Coast Conference women's basketball tournament winner As of March 27, 2013; Rankings from AP Poll

The 2012–13 Gonzaga Bulldogs women's basketball team represented Gonzaga University in the 2012–13 college basketball season. The Bulldogs (also informally referred to as the "Zags"), members of the West Coast Conference, were led by head coach Kelly Graves, in his 13th season at the school. The Zags played most of their home games at the McCarthey Athletic Center on the university campus in Spokane, Washington.

== Before the season ==
The Zags were picked to finish second in the WCC Pre-Season poll behind BYU.

== Roster ==
2012–13 Gonzaga Bulldogs women's basketball team
Players
Coaches

| Pos. | # | Name | Height | Year | Previous school | Hometown |
|---|---|---|---|---|---|---|
| G/F | 1 | Chelsea Waters | 6 ft 1 in (1.85 m) | Fr | Lewiston | Lewiston, ID |
| G | 3 | Haiden Palmer | 5 ft 8 in (1.73 m) | Jr | Oregon State; Vista Del Largo | Moreno Valley, CA |
| G | 5 | Maiki Viela | 6 ft 1 in (1.85 m) | So | Lahainaluna | Lahaina, HI |
| G | 10 | Danielle Walter | 6 ft 0 in (1.83 m) | So | Pasco | Pasco, WA |
| G | 12 | Taelor Karr | 5 ft 8 in (1.73 m) | Sr | Kansas State; Paola | Paola, KS |
| G | 13 | Michaela O'Rourke | 5 ft 10 in (1.78 m) | Fr | Eastside Catholic | Bellevue, WA |
| F | 14 | Sunny Greinacher | 6 ft 4 in (1.93 m) | So | Grashof Gymnasium | Essen, Germany |
| G | 20 | Meghan Winters | 5 ft 11 in (1.8 m) | Sr | Regis | Englewood, CO |
| F | 22 | Shaniqua Nilles | 6 ft 0 in (1.83 m) | RS Fr | West Valley | Spokane, WA |
| F | 23 | Kiara Kudron | 6 ft 2 in (1.88 m) | Fr | Huron | New Boston, MI |
| G | 24 | Keani Albanez | 5 ft 10 in (1.78 m) | So | Buena | Santa Barbara, CA |
| C | 30 | Stephanie Golden | 6 ft 3 in (1.91 m) | Jr | Miramonte | Clayton, CA |
| G | 31 | Elle Tinkle | 6 ft 2 in (1.88 m) | Fr | Big Sky | Missoula, MT |
| G | 33 | Lindsay Sherbert | 6 ft 0 in (1.83 m) | Jr | Great Oak; Cal | Temecula, CA |
| G | 34 | Jazmine Redmon | 5 ft 9 in (1.75 m) | Jr | Mead | Spokane, WA |
| C | 44 | Shelby Cheslek | 6 ft 5 in (1.96 m) | RS Fr | Pullman | Pullman, WA |

Head coach

- Kelly Graves (New Mexico)

Assistant coach(es)

- Jodie Kaczor Berry (Western Washington)
- Lisa Mispley Fortier (Cal State Monterey Bay)
- Julie Shaw (UC Riverside)

Legend

- (C) Team captain
- (S) Suspended
- (I) Ineligible
- (W) Walk-on
- Injured
- Current redshirt

Roster

== Schedule ==
| Date time, TV | Rank^{#} | Opponent^{#} | Result | Record | Site (attendance) city, state |
Exhibition
| 11/03/2012*; 2:00 pm, Zags Sports Channel | | Eastern Oregon | W 90–48 | – | McCarthey Athletic Center (5,396); Spokane, WA |
Regular Season
| 11/09/2012*; 7:00 pm | | at UC Riverside | W 60–53 | 1–0 | SRC Arena (503); Riverside, CA |
| 11/11/2012*; 2:00 pm, USC on Pac-12 Digital | | at USC | W 62–52 | 2–0 | Galen Center (832); Los Angeles, CA |
| 11/16/2012*; 6:00 pm, SWX | | Wisconsin | W 62–53 | 3–0 | McCarthey Athletic Center (5,758); Spokane, WA |
| 11/18/2012*; 6:00 pm, Zags Sports Channel | | Monmouth | W 77–51 | 4–0 | McCarthey Athletic Center (5,561); Spokane, WA |
| 11/20/2012*; 4:30 pm | | vs. Missouri State; Hardwood Tournament of Hope | W 88–60 | 5–0 | Puerto Vallarta International Convention Center (152); Puerto Vallarta, Mexico |
| 11/21/2012*; 6:30 pm | | vs. No. 6 Louisville; Hardwood Tournament of Hope Semi-finals | L 42–55 | 5–1 | Puerto Vallarta International Convention Center (167); Puerto Vallarta, Mexico |
| 11/22/2012*; 4:00 pm | | vs. Winthrop; Hardwood Tournament of Hope 3rd Place Game | W 80–66 | 6–1 | Puerto Vallarta International Convention Center (N/A); Puerto Vallarta, Mexico |
| 12/02/2012*; 2:00 pm, SWX | | No. 1 Stanford | L 41–69 | 6–2 | McCarthey Athletic Center (6,000); Spokane, WA |
| 12/04/2012*; 6:00 pm, SWX | | Eastern Washington | W 65–50 | 7–2 | McCarthey Athletic Center (5,271); Spokane, WA |
| 12/07/2012*; 7:30 pm | | at Portland State | W 54–40 | 8–2 | Stott Center (813); Portland, OR |
| 12/09/2012*; 2:00 pm, Zags Sports Channel | | Cal State Fullerton | W 83–44 | 9–2 | McCarthey Athletic Center (5,445); Spokane, WA |
| 12/17/2012*; 6:00 pm, SWX | | No. 19 Ohio State | L 60–65 | 9–3 | McCarthey Athletic Center (5,424); Spokane, WA |
| 12/20/2012*; 6:00 pm, Zags Sports Channel | | Idaho | W 97–62 | 10–3 | McCarthey Athletic Center (5,370); Spokane, WA |
| 12/29/2012*; 2:00 pm, SWX | | Washington State | L 51–57 | 10–4 | McCarthey Athletic Center (5,370); Spokane, WA |
| 01/03/2013; 6:00 pm, Zags Sports Channel | | San Diego | W 77–57 | 11–4 (1–0) | McCarthey Athletic Center (5,220); Spokane, WA |
| 01/05/2013; 2:00 pm, SWX | | Santa Clara | W 79–50 | 12–4 (2–0) | McCarthey Athletic Center (5,690); Spokane, WA |
| 01/10/2013; 6:00 pm | | at Saint Mary's | L 51–54 | 12–5 (2–1) | McKeon Pavilion (604); Moraga, CA |
| 01/14/2013; 7:00 pm | | at Portland | W 82–51 | 13–5 (3–1) | Chiles Center (469); Portland, OR |
| 01/17/2013; 6:00 pm, SWX | | BYU | W 74–59 | 14–5 (4–1) | McCarthey Athletic Center (6,000); Spokane, WA |
| 01/19/2013; 2:00 pm | | at San Diego | W 62–50 | 15–5 (5–1) | Jenny Craig Pavilion (528); San Diego, CA |
| 01/24/2013; 7:00 pm, TV-32 | | at Pepperdine | W 80–46 | 16–5 (6–1) | Firestone Fieldhouse (277); Malibu, CA |
| 01/31/2013; 6:00 pm, SWX | | Loyola Marymount | W 79–57 | 17–5 (7–1) | McCarthey Athletic Center (5,223); Spokane, WA |
| 02/02/2013; 2:00 pm, SWX | | Pepperdine | W 81–52 | 18–5 (8–1) | McCarthey Athletic Center (6,000); Spokane, WA |
| 02/07/2013; 7:00 pm | | at San Francisco | W 84–46 | 19–5 (9–1) | War Memorial Gymnasium (308); San Francisco, CA |
| 02/09/2013; 2:00 pm | | at Loyola Marymount | W 70–56 | 20–5 (10–1) | Gersten Pavilion (351); Los Angeles, CA |
| 02/14/2013; 6:00 pm, SWX | | Saint Mary's | W 69–54 | 21–5 (11–1) | McCarthey Athletic Center (6,000); Spokane, WA |
| 02/16/2013; 2:00 pm, Zags Sports Channel | | San Francisco | W 101–65 | 22–5 (12–1) | McCarthey Athletic Center (6,000); Spokane, WA |
| 02/21/2013; 6:00 pm, NBCSN | | at Santa Clara | W 70–55 | 23–5 (13–1) | Leavey Center (550); Santa Clara, CA |
| 02/23/2013; 1:00 pm, BYUtv | | at BYU | W 66–55 | 24–5 (14–1) | Marriott Center (1,430); Provo, UT |
| 02/28/2013; 6:00 pm, Zags Sports Channel | | Portland | W 59–56 | 25–5 (15–1) | McCarthey Athletic Center (6,000); Spokane, WA |
2013 West Coast Conference women's basketball tournament
| 03/09/2013; 12:00 pm, BYUtv/ WCC Digital | No. 1-seed | vs. No. 4-seed BYU; WCC Tournament Semifinals | W 62–43 | 26–5 | Orleans Arena (7,896); Las Vegas, NV |
| 03/11/2013; 1:00 pm, ESPNU | No. 1-seed | vs. No. 2-seed San Diego; WCC Tournament Championship | W 62–50 | 27–5 | Orleans Arena (7,896); Las Vegas, NV |
2013 NCAA Division I women's basketball tournament
| 03/23/2013*; 1:15 pm, ESPN2 | No. 12-seed | No. 23/ 5-seed Iowa State; NCAA Tournament 1st Round | L 60–72 | 27–6 | McCarthey Athletic Center (6,000); Spokane, WA |
*Non-conference game. ^{#}Rankings from AP Poll. (#) Tournament seedings in parentheses. All times are in Pacific Time.

== Rankings ==
Regular season polls
| Poll | Pre- Season | Week 1 | Week 2 | Week 3 | Week 4 | Week 5 | Week 6 | Week 7 | Week 8 | Week 9 | Week 10 | Week 11 | Week 12 | Week 13 | Week 14 | Week 15 | Week 16 | Week 17 | Week 18 | Final |
|---|---|---|---|---|---|---|---|---|---|---|---|---|---|---|---|---|---|---|---|---|
| AP | RV | RV | RV | RV | NR | RV | RV | NR | NR | NR | NR | NR | NR | NR | NR | NR | RV | | | |
| Coaches | RV | RV | RV | RV | RV | RV | RV | RV | RV | NR | NR | NR | NR | NR | NR | NR | RV | | | |

Legend
| | Increase in ranking |
| | Decrease in ranking |
| | No change |
| (RV) | Received votes |
| (NR) | Not ranked |
