= 2012–13 Saint Mary's Gaels women's basketball team =

Intercollegiate basketball season

2012–13 Saint Mary's Gaels women's basketball

WNIT, Quarterfinals
- Conference: West Coast Conference
- Record: 23–11 (11–5 WCC)
- Head coach: Paul Thomas (7th season)
- Assistant coaches: Jesse Clark; Allyson Fasnacht; Tracy Sanders
- Home arena: McKeon Pavilion

2012–13 West Coast Conference Women's basketball standings
	Conf.				Overall
Team	W		L	PCT	W		L	PCT
Gonzaga†	15	–	1	.938	27	–	6	.818
San Diego	12	–	4	.750	22	–	10	.688
Saint Mary's	11	–	5	.688	23	–	10	.697
BYU	11	–	5	.688	23	–	11	.676
Loyola Marymount	6	–	10	.375	13	–	18	.419
Santa Clara	6	–	10	.375	14	–	16	.467
Portland	5	–	11	.313	11	–	20	.355
San Francisco	4	–	12	.250	12	–	19	.387
Pepperdine	2	–	14	.125	5	–	23	.179
† 2013 West Coast Conference women's basketball tournament winner As of March 27, 2013; Rankings from AP Poll

The 2012–13 Saint Mary's Gaels women's basketball team represented Saint Mary's College of California in the 2012–13 college basketball season. It was head coach Paul Thomas's seventh season at Saint Mary's. The Gaels, members of the West Coast Conference, played their home games at the McKeon Pavilion. They finished the season at 23–11, 11–5 in conference play, and clinched the #3 seed in the WCC Tourney. After losing in the semifinals of the WCC Tournament, Saint Mary's was invited to participate in the 2013 Women's National Invitation Tournament, where they advanced to the quarterfinal round before being eliminated.

== Before the season ==
The Gaels were picked to finish third in the WCC behind BYU and Gonzaga. While the Gaels finished tied for third with BYU, the Treros were a sneaky bunch and claimed the #2 seed in the WCC.

== Roster ==
2012–13 Saint Mary's Gaels women's basketball team
Players
Coaches

Pos.	#	Name	Height	Year	Previous school	Hometown
G	1	Lauren Nicholson	6 ft 0 in (1.83 m)	Fr	Woolooware	Sydney, Australia
G	3	Jackie Nared	6 ft 1 in (1.85 m)	RS Jr	Westview; Wisconsin	Portland, OR
G	5	Hannah Kaser	5 ft 10 in (1.78 m)	Fr	St. Paul's Anglican	Leongatha, Australia
G	10	Kate Gaze	5 ft 8 in (1.73 m)	RS Jr	Australia Institute of Sport	Sydney, Australia
F	11	Valerie Moore	5 ft 10 in (1.78 m)	Fr	Modesto Christian	Merced, CA
F	12	Hayley Hendricksen	6 ft 0 in (1.83 m)	So	Lewis and Clark	Spokane, WA
G	14	Shannon Mauldin	5 ft 9 in (1.75 m)	Fr	Saint Mary's	San Pablo, CA
G	21	Mia Greco	5 ft 6 in (1.68 m)	Sr	Petaluma; Santa Rosa	Petaluma, CA
G	23	Andrea Bailey	6 ft 0 in (1.83 m)	Sr	Dalles Wahtonka	The Dalles, OR
G	24	Morgan Hatten	6 ft 0 in (1.83 m)	Sr	Clovis West	Hanford, CA
F	25	Carli Rosenthal	6 ft 3 in (1.91 m)	So	Coeur d'Alene	Coeur d'Alene, ID
F	30	Amanda Arter	6 ft 2 in (1.88 m)	So	Brea Olinda	Brea, CA
G	32	Samira McDonald	5 ft 9 in (1.75 m)	Fr	River Ridge	Lacey, WA
F	33	Ashlee Smith	6 ft 1 in (1.85 m)	RS Jr	Skyview	Vancouver, WA
F	54	Danielle Mauldin	6 ft 0 in (1.83 m)	Jr	Saint Mary's	Hercules, CA

Head coach

- Paul Thomas (Wayne State College)

Assistant coach(es)

- Jesse Clark (Pacific Union College)
- Allyson Fasnacht (Liberty)
- Tracy Sanders (St. Mary's)

Legend

- (C) Team captain
- (S) Suspended
- (I) Ineligible
- (W) Walk-on
- Injured
- Current redshirt

Roster

== Schedule and results ==
Date time, TV	Rank^{#}	Opponent^{#}	Result	Record	Site (attendance) city, state
Regular Season
11/09/2012*; 7:00 pm		at Washington	L 68–70	0–1	Hec Edmundson Pavilion (1,567); Seattle, WA
11/11/2012*; 2:00 pm, Oregon on Pac-12 Digital		at Oregon	W 78–69	1–1	Matthew Knight Arena (1,237); Eugene, OR
11/15/2012*; 7:00 pm, Cal on Pac-12 Digital		at No. 12 Cal	L 41–89	1–2	Haas Pavilion (917); Berkeley, CA
11/23/2012*; 2:00 pm, Gaels Insider		Butler; Hilton Concord Thanksgiving Classic	W 85–74	2–2	McKeon Pavilion (379); Moraga, CA
11/24/2012*; 2:00 pm, Gaels Insider		Chattanooga; Hilton Concord Thanksgiving Classic	W 70–67	3–2	McKeon Pavilion (257); Moraga, CA
11/29/2012*; 7:00 pm, BigWest.TV		at Cal Poly	W 70–67	4–2	Mott Gym (367); San Luis Obispo, CA
12/01/2012*; 2:00 pm, BigWest.TV		at UC Santa Barbara	W 49–39	5–2	UC Santa Barbara Events Center (862); Santa Barbara, CA
12/06/2012*; 7:00 pm, BigWest.TV		at UC Davis	W 75–56	6–2	The Pavilion (387); Davis, CA
12/15/2012*; 11:30 am, ESPN3		vs. No. 14 UCLA; St. John's Chartwells Holiday Classic	L 62–76	6–3	Carnesecca Arena (630); Queens, NY
12/16/2012*; 9:00 am, ESPN3		vs. Tennessee Tech; St. John's Chartwells Holiday Classic Consolation Game	W 73–58	7–3	Carnesecca Arena (N/A); Queens, NY
12/20/2012*; 7:00 pm, Gaels Insider		Pacific	L 72–75	7–4	McKeon Pavilion (440); Moraga, CA
12/30/2012*; 12:00 pm, Gaels Insider		George Washington	W 79–49	8–4	McKeon Pavilion (460); Moraga, CA
01/03/2013; 7:00 pm, USF on Stretch		at San Francisco	L 48–68	9–4 (1–0)	War Memorial Gymnasium (405); San Francisco, CA
01/05/2013; 2:00 pm, LMU All Access		at Loyola Marymount	W 84–77 ^{OT}	10–4 (2–0)	Gersten Pavilion (472); Los Angeles, CA
01/10/2013; 7:00 pm, Gaels Insider		Gonzaga	W 54–51	11–4 (3–0)	McKeon Pavilion (604); Moraga, CA
01/17/2013; 7:00 pm, Gaels Insider		San Diego	L 70–73	11–5 (3–1)	McKeon Pavilion (509); Moraga, CA
01/19/2013; 2:00 pm, Gaels Insider		Pepperdine	W 72–61	12–5 (4–1)	McKeon Pavilion (688); Moraga, CA
01/24/2013; 7:00 pm, Santa Clara on Stretch		at Santa Clara	W 56–50	13–5 (5–1)	Leavey Center (421); Santa Clara, CA
01/28/2013; 7:00 pm, Gaels Insider		San Francisco	W 68–63	14–5 (6–1)	McKeon Pavilion (390); Moraga, CA
01/31/2013; 6:00 pm, BYUtv		at BYU	L 58–66	14–6 (6–2)	Marriott Center (682); Provo, UT
02/07/2013; 6:00 pm, Gaels Insider		Portland	W 58–53	15–6 (7–2)	McKeon Pavilion (412); Moraga, CA
02/09/2013; 2:00 pm, Gaels Insider		BYU	W 64–52	16–6 (8–2)	McKeon Pavilion (562); Moraga, CA
02/14/2013; 6:00 pm, SWX		at Gonzaga	L 54–69	16–7 (8–3)	McCarthey Athletic Center (6,000); Spokane, WA
02/16/2013; 7:00 pm, Portland on Stretch		at Portland	W 49–43	17–7 (9–3)	Chiles Center (633); Portland, OR
02/21/2013; 7:00 pm, USD on Stretch		at San Diego	L 50–67	17–8 (9–4)	Jenny Craig Pavilion (363); San Diego, CA
02/23/2013; 2:00 pm, Gaels Insider		Loyola Marymount	W 70–57	18–8 (10–4)	McKeon Pavilion (N/A); Moraga, CA
02/28/2013; 7:00 pm, Gaels Insider		Santa Clara	W 65–56	19–8 (11–4)	McKeon Pavilion (498); Moraga, CA
03/02/2013; 2:00 pm, TV-32		at Pepperdine	L 67–80	19–9 (11–5)	Firestone Fieldhouse (276); Malibu, CA
2013 West Coast Conference women's basketball tournament
03/08/2013; 2:30 pm, BYUtv/ WCC Digital		vs. Portland; WCC Tournament Quarterfinals	W 54–51	20–9	Orleans Arena (7,896); Las Vegas, NV
03/09/2013; 2:30 pm, BYUtv/ WCC Digital		vs. San Diego; WCC Tournament Semifinals	L 53–74	20–10	Orleans Arena (7,896); Las Vegas, NV
2013 Women's National Invitation Tournament
03/21/2013*; 7:00 pm, Gaels Insider		Seattle; WNIT Tournament 1st Round	W 68–51	21–10	McKeon Pavilion (187); Moraga, CA
03/24/2013*; 12:00 pm, Big Sky TV		at Northern Colorado; WNIT Tournament 2nd Round	W 68–58	22–10	Butler–Hancock Sports Pavilion (837); Greeley, CO
03/27/2013; 2:00 pm, BYUtv		at BYU; WNIT Tournament 3rd Round	W 59–55	23–10	Marriott Center (449); Provo, UT
03/31/2013; 2:00 pm, Gaels Live		Utah; WNIT Tournament Quarterfinal	L 55–58	23–11	McKeon Pavilion (381); Moraga, CA
*Non-conference game. ^{#}Rankings from AP Poll. (#) Tournament seedings in parentheses. All times are in Pacific Time.

== Rankings ==
+ Regular season polls	Poll	Pre- Season	Week 1	Week 2	Week 3	Week 4	Week 5	Week 6	Week 7	Week 8	Week 9	Week 10	Week 11	Week 12	Week 13	Week 14	Week 15	Week 16	Week 17	Week 18	Final
AP	NR	NR	NR	NR	NR	NR	NR	NR	NR	NR	NR	NR	NR	NR	NR	NR	NR	NR			
Coaches	NR	NR	NR	NR	NR	NR	NR	NR	NR	NR	NR	NR	NR	NR	NR	NR	NR	NR			

Legend
	Increase in ranking
	Decrease in ranking
	No change
(RV)	Received votes
(NR)	Not ranked

== See also ==
- Saint Mary's Gaels women's basketball
