= 2013 West Coast Conference women's basketball tournament =

- Classification: Division I
- Season: 2012–13
- Teams: 9
- Site: Orleans Arena; Paradise, NV
- Finals site: Orleans Arena; Paradise, NV
- Champions: Gonzaga (5th title)
- Winning coach: Kelly Graves (5th title)
- MVP: Haiden Palmer (Gonzaga)
- Television: ESPNU/BYUtv Sports

2012–13 West Coast Conference Women's basketball standings
	Conf.				Overall
Team	W		L	PCT	W		L	PCT
Gonzaga†	15	–	1	.938	27	–	6	.818
San Diego	12	–	4	.750	22	–	10	.688
Saint Mary's	11	–	5	.688	23	–	10	.697
BYU	11	–	5	.688	23	–	11	.676
Loyola Marymount	6	–	10	.375	13	–	18	.419
Santa Clara	6	–	10	.375	14	–	16	.467
Portland	5	–	11	.313	11	–	20	.355
San Francisco	4	–	12	.250	12	–	19	.387
Pepperdine	2	–	14	.125	5	–	23	.179
† 2013 West Coast Conference women's basketball tournament winner As of March 27, 2013; Rankings from AP Poll

The 2013 West Coast Conference women's basketball tournament was held March 6–11, 2013, at the Orleans Arena in the Las Vegas area community of Paradise, Nevada.

== Format ==
For the second consecutive year the tournament featured a 9-team single elimination format. The 1 and 2 seeds received a bye to the semifinals while the 3 and 4 seeds received a bye to the quarterfinals. The tournament began on Wednesday, 6 March with an 8/9 game. The second round took place on Thursday, 7 March. The tournament quarterfinals were held on Friday, 8 March. The conference semifinals were held on Saturday, 9 March. The first 4 rounds were broadcast on BYUtv Sports and shown online through the conferences web provider- Campus Insiders at WCC Digital. The championship game was played on Monday, 11 March 2013 and broadcast on television by ESPNU.

== Seeds ==
2013 West Coast Conference men's basketball tournament seeds
Seed	School	Conference Record	Overall Record (End of Regular season)	Tiebreaker
1.	Gonzaga	15-1	25-5	
2.	San Diego	12-4	20-8	
3.	Saint Mary's	11-5	20-9	1-1 vs. #1 seed Gonzaga
4.	BYU	11-5	20-9	0-2 vs. #1 seed Gonzaga
5.	Loyola Marymount	6-10	12-17	1-1 vs. #4 seed BYU
6.	Santa Clara	6-10	14-15	0-2 vs. #4 seed BYU
7.	Portland	5-11	10-19	
8.	San Francisco	4-12	11-18	
9.	Pepperdine	2-14	5-22	

== Schedule ==
Session	Game	Time*	Matchup^{#}
First round – Wednesday, March 6- BYUtv
1	1	3:00 PM	#8 San Francisco vs. #9 Pepperdine
Second round – Thursday, March 7- BYUtv
2	2	12:00 PM	#5 Loyola Marymount vs. #8 San Francisco
2	3	2:30 PM	#6 Santa Clara vs. #7 Portland
Quarterfinals – Friday, March 8- BYUtv
3	4	12:00 PM	#4 BYU vs. #5 Loyola Marymount
3	5	2:30 PM	#3 Saint Mary's vs. #7 Portland
Semifinals – Saturday, March 9- BYUtv
4	6	12:00 PM	#1 Gonzaga vs. #4 BYU
4	7	2:30 PM	#2 San Diego vs. #3 Saint Mary's
Championship Game – Monday, March 11- ESPNU
5	8	1:00 PM	#1 Gonzaga vs. #2 San Diego
*Game Times in PT. #-Rankings denote tournament seeding.

== Bracket and scores ==
First round Wednesday, March 6, 2012; BYUtv
8	San Francisco	80
9	Pepperdine	48

Second round Thursday, March 7, 2012; BYUtv
5	Loyola Marymount	75
8	San Francisco	53
6	Santa Clara	64
7	Portland	70

Quarterfinals; Friday, March 8, 2012; BYUtv
4	BYU	69
5	Loyola Marymount	57
3	Saint Mary's	54
7	Portland	51

Semifinals; Saturday, March 9, 2012; BYUtv
1	Gonzaga	62
4	BYU	43
2	San Diego	74
3	Saint Mary's	53

Championship; Monday, March 11, 2012; ESPNU
1	Gonzaga	62
2	San Diego	50

== Game summaries ==
=== 1st Round: San Francisco vs. Pepperdine ===
Series History: Pepperdine leads series 34-32
Broadcasters: Dave McCann, Steve Cleveland, and Jarom Jordan

BYUtv

Mar 6
3:00 pm PST

Recap

Pepperdine Waves 48, San Francisco Dons 80
Scoring by half: 20-42, 28-38
Pts: Keitra Wallace 15; Rebs: Kelsey Patrick 9 Asts: Shay Cooney-Williams 3	Pts: Mel Khlok 19; Rebs: Bailey Barbour 12; Asts: Taj Winston & Mel Khlok 3

Orleans Arena
Paradise, NV
Attendance: 7,896
Referees: Anita Ortega, Michol Murray, Brian Woods

=== 2nd Round: Loyola Marymount vs. San Francisco ===
Series History: Series even 31-31
Broadcasters: Dave McCann and Steve Cleveland (Play-by-play); Blaine Fowler and Jarom Jordan (Halftime and Bridge Show)

BYUtv

Mar 7
12:00 pm PST

Recap

San Francisco Dons 53, Loyola Marymount Lions 75
Scoring by half: 19-47, 34-28
Pts: Mel Khlok 22; Rebs: Taj Winston & Alicia Scafidi 6 Asts: Zhane Dikes 3	Pts: Deanna Johnson 17; Rebs: Alex Cowling 7 Asts: Dani LeNoir 5

Orleans Arena
Paradise, NV
Attendance: 7,896
Referees: Cathi Cornell, Bart Baldwin, Karen Lasuik

=== 2nd Round: Santa Clara vs. Portland ===
Series History: Santa Clara leads series 34-28
Broadcasters: Dave McCann and Steve Cleveland (Play-by-play); Blaine Fowler and Jarom Jordan (Halftime)

BYUtv

Mar 7
2:30 pm PST

Recap

Portland Pilots 70, Santa Clara Broncos 64
Scoring by half: 35-32, 35-32
Pts: Kari Luttinen 17; Rebs: Amy Pupa 10; Asts: Alexis Byrd 4	Pts: Meagan Fulps 19; Rebs: Ruta Zurauskyte 6 Asts: Raquel Avila & Katie Hawkins 4

Orleans Arena
Paradise, NV
Attendance: 7,896
Referees: Wanda Szeremeta, Shelley Russi, Cheryl Flores

=== Quarterfinals: BYU vs. Loyola Marymount ===
Series History: BYU leads series 5-1
Broadcasters: Dave McCann and Blaine Fowler (Play-by-play); Steve Cleveland and Jarom Jordan (Halftime); Blaine Fowler, Steve Cleveland, and Jarom Jordan (Bridge Show)

BYUtv

Mar 8
12:00 pm PST

Recap

Loyola Marymount Lions 57, BYU Cougars 69
Scoring by half: 26-35, 31-34
Pts: Alex Cowling 17; Rebs: Alex Cowling 8 Asts: Dani LeNoir 5	Pts: Stephanie Seaborn 21; Rebs: Jennifer Hamson 13; Asts: Haley Steed 5

Orleans Arena
Paradise, NV
Attendance: 7,896
Referees: Shelley Russi, Karen Lasuik, Brian Woods

=== Quarterfinals: Saint Mary's vs. Portland ===
Series History: Saint Mary's leads series 35-20
Broadcasters: Dave McCann, Steve Cleveland, and Jarom Jordan

BYUtv

Mar 8
2:30 pm PST

Recap

Portland Pilots 51, Saint Mary's Gaels 54
Scoring by half: 25-30, 26-24
Pts: Kari Luttinen 14; Rebs: Amy Pupa 14; Asts: Jasmine Wooton 5	Pts: Jackie Nared & Kate Gaze 13; Rebs: Jackie Nared & Danielle Mauldin 10; Asts: Kate Gaze & Morgan Hatten 2

Orleans Arena
Las Vegas, NV
Attendance: 7,896
Referees: Kyle Bacon, Bart Baldwin, Cheryl Flores

=== Semifinal: Gonzaga vs. BYU ===
Series History: Gonzaga leads series 6-5
Broadcasters: Dave McCann, Steve Cleveland, and Jarom Jordan

BYUtv

Mar 9
12:00 pm PST

Recap

BYU Cougars 43, Gonzaga Bulldogs 62
Scoring by half: 19-30, 24-32
Pts: Morgan Bailey 12; Rebs: Haley Steed & Keilani Unga 7 Asts: Haley Steed 3	Pts: Shelby Cheslek 16; Rebs: Shelby Cheslek 8 Asts: Jazmine Redmon 5

Orleans Arena
Las Vegas, NV
Attendance: 7,896
Referees: Michol Murray, Cathi Cornell, Kyle Bacon

=== Semifinal: San Diego vs. Saint Mary's ===
Series History: Saint Mary's leads series 37-25
Broadcasters: Dave McCann, Steve Cleveland, and Jarom Jordan

BYUtv

Mar 9
2:30 pm PST

Recap

Saint Mary's Gaels 53, San Diego Toreros 74
Scoring by half: 25-43, 28-31
Pts: Jackie Nared 17; Rebs: Danielle Mauldin 13; Asts: Morgan Hatten 2	Pts: Amy Kame 25; Rebs: Sophia Ederaine 5 Asts: Amy Kame & Katelyn McDaniel 5 Cindy Fisher 200th career win

Orleans Arena
Las Vegas, NV
Attendance: 7,896
Referees: Anita Ortega, Shelley Russi, Karen Lasuik

=== Championship: Gonzaga vs. San Diego ===
Series History: Gonzaga leads series 44-20
Broadcasters: Rich Cellini and Rosalyn Gold-Onwude

ESPNU

Mar 11
1:00 pm PST

Recap

Gonzaga Bulldogs 62, San Diego Toreros 50
Scoring by half: 29-25, 33-25
Pts: Haiden Palmer 18; Rebs: Shelby Cheslek 9 Asts: Taelor Karr 6	Pts: Amy Kame 13; Rebs: Katelyn McDaniel 9 Asts: Klara Wischer 3

Orleans Arena
Las Vegas, NV
Attendance: 7,896
Referees: Anita Ortega, Michol Murray, Kyle Bacon

== All tournament conference team ==
Name	School	Pos.	Year	Ht.	Hometown

== See also ==
- 2012–13 NCAA Division I women's basketball season
- West Coast Conference men's basketball tournament
- 2012–13 West Coast Conference men's basketball season
- 2013 West Coast Conference men's basketball tournament
- 2012–13 West Coast Conference women's basketball season
- West Coast Conference women's basketball tournament
