= 2012–13 Loyola Marymount Lions women's basketball team =

Intercollegiate basketball season

2012–13 Loyola Marymount Lions women's basketball
- Conference: West Coast Conference
- Record: 13–18 (6–10 WCC)
- Head coach: Charity Elliott (1st season)
- Assistant coaches: Alexis Mezzetta; Jackie Stiles; Tracey Wolff/Chris Elliott
- Home arena: Gersten Pavilion

2012–13 West Coast Conference Women's basketball standings
	Conf.				Overall
Team	W		L	PCT	W		L	PCT
Gonzaga†	15	–	1	.938	27	–	6	.818
San Diego	12	–	4	.750	22	–	10	.688
Saint Mary's	11	–	5	.688	23	–	10	.697
BYU	11	–	5	.688	23	–	11	.676
Loyola Marymount	6	–	10	.375	13	–	18	.419
Santa Clara	6	–	10	.375	14	–	16	.467
Portland	5	–	11	.313	11	–	20	.355
San Francisco	4	–	12	.250	12	–	19	.387
Pepperdine	2	–	14	.125	5	–	23	.179
† 2013 West Coast Conference women's basketball tournament winner As of March 27, 2013; Rankings from AP Poll

The 2012–13 Loyola Marymount Lions women's basketball team represented the Loyola Marymount in the 2012–13 college basketball season. The Lions, members of the West Coast Conference, were led by head coach Charity Elliott, in her 1st season at the school. The Lions played their home games at the Gersten Pavilion on the university campus in Los Angeles, California, and finished the season 13–18, 6–10 in conference play.

== Before the Season ==
The Lions were picked to finish seventh in the WCC Pre-Season poll.

== Roster ==
2012–13 Loyola Marymount Lions women's basketball team
Players
Coaches

Pos.	#	Name	Height	Year	Previous school	Hometown
F	0	Ashley Lovett	6 ft 0 in (1.83 m)	So	Vista Murrieta	Murrieta, CA
G	1	Danielle Pruitt	5 ft 8 in (1.73 m)	So	View Park Prep	Los Angeles, CA
G	2	Dani LeNoir	5 ft 5 in (1.65 m)	RS Sr	Washington State	Los Angeles, CA
G/F	3	Alex Cowling	5 ft 10 in (1.78 m)	RS Sr	St. Patrick-St. Vincent	Benicia, CA
G	4	Hazel Ramirez	5 ft 5 in (1.65 m)	Jr	Inglewood	Huntington Beach, CA
G/F	5	Chelsea Barnes	5 ft 10 in (1.78 m)	Fr	Diamond Ranch	Covina, CA
F	11	Melinda Gomez	5 ft 11 in (1.8 m)	Fr	South Hills	W. Covina, CA
G	13	Deanna Johnson	5 ft 7 in (1.7 m)	RS Fr	Norco	Corona, CA
F	15	Emily Ben-Jumbo	6 ft 1 in (1.85 m)	So	Tualatin	Tualatin, OR
G/F	20	Sophie Taylor	6 ft 0 in (1.83 m)	Fr	Acalanes	Lafayette, CA
G	21	Taylor Anderson (injured)	6 ft 0 in (1.83 m)	So	Bonita	La Verne, CA
C	32	Alexis Love	6 ft 2 in (1.88 m)	Jr	Norwalk	Norwalk, CA
C	33	Brianna Kennedy	6 ft 3 in (1.91 m)	Fr	Bonita	La Verne, CA
F/C	35	Mackenzie Kerins	6 ft 1 in (1.85 m)	Jr	South Eugene	Eugene, OR

Head coach

- Charity Elliott (Missouri State)

Assistant coach(es)

- Alexis Mezzetta (UC San Diego)
- Jackie Stiles (Missouri State)
- Brittney Taylor (Humboldt State)

Legend

- (C) Team captain
- (S) Suspended
- (I) Ineligible
- (W) Walk-on
- Injured
- Current redshirt

Roster

== Schedule ==
Date time, TV	Rank^{#}	Opponent^{#}	Result	Record	Site (attendance) city, state
Exhibition
11/03/2012*; 2:00 pm, LMU All Access		The Master's	W 88–58	-	Gersten Pavilion (213); Los Angeles, CA
Regular Season
11/10/2012*; 12:00 pm		at UTEP	L 51–79	0–1	Don Haskins Center (1,706); El Paso, TX
11/12/2012*; 5:30 pm		at New Mexico State	L 76–77	0–2	Pan American Center (1,042); Las Cruces, NM
11/15/2012*; 7:00 pm, LMU All Access		Long Beach State	W 58–52	1–2	Gersten Pavilion (314); Los Angeles, CA
11/17/2012*; 2:00 pm, LMU All Access		Utah State	W 98–81	2–2	Gersten Pavilion (417); Los Angeles, CA
11/20/2012*; 7:00 pm, LMU All Access		Cal State Fullerton	W 85–73	3–2	Gersten Pavilion (372); Los Angeles, CA
11/23/2012*; 11:30 am		vs. Iowa State; Junkanoo Jam	L 33–55	3–3	Radisson Grand Lucayan Beach & Golf Resort (215); Grand Bahama
11/24/2012*; 9:15 am		vs. Tulsa; Junkanoo Jam	W 75–74	4–3	Radisson Grand Lucayan Beach & Golf Resort (225); Grand Bahama
11/28/2012*; 7:00 pm, LMU All Access		Colorado State	W 69–52	5–3	Gersten Pavilion (210); Los Angeles, CA
12/02/2012*; 7:00 pm, UCLA on Pac-12 Digital		at UCLA	L 66–86	5–4	Pauley Pavilion (1,172); Los Angeles, CA
12/05/2012*; 7:00 pm, LMU All Access		UC Santa Barbara	L 69–76	5–5	Gersten Pavilion (274); Los Angeles, CA
12/15/2012*; 2:00 pm, LMU All Access		Oregon State	W 73–62	6–5	Gersten Pavilion (236); Los Angeles, CA
12/20/2012*; 7:00 pm		at Cal Poly	L 71–84	6–6	Mott Gym (143); San Luis Obispo, CA
12/29/2012*; 1:00 pm		at Wyoming	L 68–84	6–7	Arena-Auditorium (3,451); Laramie, WY
01/03/2013; 7:00 pm, LMU All Access		Pepperdine	W 65–47	7–7 (1–0)	Gersten Pavilion (279); Los Angeles, CA
01/05/2013; 2:00 pm, LMU All Access		Saint Mary's	L 77–84 ^{OT}	7–8 (1–1)	Gersten Pavilion (472); Los Angeles, CA
01/10/2013; 7:00 pm, Santa Clara on Stretch		at Santa Clara	L 54–58	7–9 (1–2)	Leavey Center (488); Santa Clara, CA
01/12/2013; 2:00 pm, USD on Stretch		at San Diego	L 78–88	7–10 (1–3)	Jenny Craig Pavilion (309); San Diego, CA
01/17/2013; 7:00 pm, LMU All Access		San Francisco	W 65–50	8–10 (2–3)	Gersten Pavilion (252); Los Angeles, CA
01/19/2013; 2:00 pm, LMU All Access		Portland	L 59–63	8–11 (2–4)	Gersten Pavilion (317); Los Angeles, CA
01/24/2013; 5:00 pm, BYUtv		at BYU	L 53–72	8–12 (2–5)	Marriott Center (854); Provo, UT
01/31/2013; 6:00 pm, SWX		at Gonzaga	L 57–79	8–13 (2–6)	McCarthey Athletic Center (5,223); Spokane, WA
02/02/2013; 2:00 pm, Portland on Stretch		at Portland	L 63–65	8–14 (2–7)	Chiles Center (483); Portland, OR
02/07/2013; 6:00 pm, LMU All Access		Santa Clara	W 71–50	9–14 (3–7)	Gersten Pavilion (291); Los Angeles, CA
02/09/2013; 2:00 pm, LMU All Access		Gonzaga	L 56–70	9–15 (3–8)	Gersten Pavilion (351); Los Angeles, CA
02/14/2013; 7:00 pm, LMU All Access		San Diego	L 59–66	9–16 (3–9)	Gersten Pavilion (221); Los Angeles, CA
02/21/2013; 7:00 pm, TV-32		at Pepperdine	W 58–56	10–16 (4–9)	Firestone Fieldhouse (213); Malibu, CA
02/23/2013; 2:00 pm, Gaels Insider		at Saint Mary's	L 57–70	10–17 (4–10)	McKeon Pavilion; Moraga, CA
02/28/2013; 7:00 pm, LMU All Access		BYU	W 68–55	11–17 (5–11)	Gersten Pavilion (587); Los Angeles, CA
03/02/2013; 2:00 pm, USF on Stretch		at San Francisco	W 58–55	12–17 (6–10)	War Memorial Gymnasium (566); San Francisco, CA
2013 West Coast Conference women's basketball tournament
03/07/2013; 12:00 pm, BYUtv/ WCC Digital		vs. San Francisco; WCC Tournament 2nd Round	W 75–53	13–17	Orleans Arena (7,896); Las Vegas, NV
03/07/2013; 12:00 pm, BYUtv/ WCC Digital		vs. BYU; WCC Tournament Quarterfinals	L 57–69	13–18	Orleans Arena (7,896); Las Vegas, NV
*Non-conference game. ^{#}Rankings from AP Poll. (#) Tournament seedings in parentheses.

== Rankings ==
+ Regular season polls	Poll	Pre- Season	Week 1	Week 2	Week 3	Week 4	Week 5	Week 6	Week 7	Week 8	Week 9	Week 10	Week 11	Week 12	Week 13	Week 14	Week 15	Week 16	Week 17	Week 18	Final
AP	NR	NR	NR	NR	NR	NR	NR	NR	NR	NR	NR	NR	NR	NR	NR	NR	NR	NR			
Coaches	NR	NR	NR	NR	NR	NR	NR	NR	NR	NR	NR	NR	NR	NR	NR	NR	NR	NR			

Legend
	Increase in ranking
	Decrease in ranking
	No change
(RV)	Received votes
(NR)	Not ranked

== See also ==
- Loyola Marymount Lions women's basketball
