= 2012–13 Santa Clara Broncos women's basketball team =

Intercollegiate basketball season

2012–13 Santa Clara Broncos women's basketball
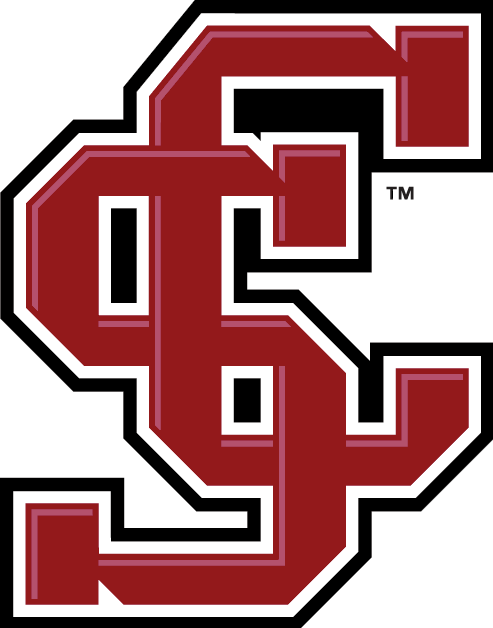
- Conference: West Coast Conference
- Record: 14–16 (6–10 WCC)
- Head coach: Jennifer Mountain (5th season)
- Assistant coaches: Marissa White; Stacy Clinesmith; Rich Brown
- Home arena: Leavey Center

2012–13 West Coast Conference Women's basketball standings
	Conf.				Overall
Team	W		L	PCT	W		L	PCT
Gonzaga†	15	–	1	.938	27	–	6	.818
San Diego	12	–	4	.750	22	–	10	.688
Saint Mary's	11	–	5	.688	23	–	10	.697
BYU	11	–	5	.688	23	–	11	.676
Loyola Marymount	6	–	10	.375	13	–	18	.419
Santa Clara	6	–	10	.375	14	–	16	.467
Portland	5	–	11	.313	11	–	20	.355
San Francisco	4	–	12	.250	12	–	19	.387
Pepperdine	2	–	14	.125	5	–	23	.179
† 2013 West Coast Conference women's basketball tournament winner As of March 27, 2013; Rankings from AP Poll

The 2012–13 Santa Clara Broncos women's basketball team represented Santa Clara University in the 2012–13 college basketball season. It was head coach Jennifer Mountain's fifth season at Santa Clara. The Broncos, members of the West Coast Conference, played their home games at the Leavey Center. The Broncos would finish the season 14–16, 6–10 in conference, to finish in a tie for 5th place. Despite having the better overall record, the Broncos were awarded the 6th seed in the WCC Tournament and were eliminated in the 2nd round.

== Before the season ==
The Gaels were picked to finish fifth in the WCC.

== Roster ==
2012–13 Santa Clara Broncos women's basketball team
Players
Coaches

Pos.	#	Name	Height	Year	Previous school	Hometown
G	3	Meagan Fulps	5 ft 7 in (1.7 m)	Sr	Highlands Ranch	Littleton, CO
G	4	Ricki Radanovich	5 ft 10 in (1.78 m)	Jr	Carondelet	Diablo, CA
G/F	10	Katie Hawkins	5 ft 11 in (1.8 m)	Fr	Glacier Park	Snohomish, WA
G	11	Noe Viloria	5 ft 10 in (1.78 m)	RS Jr	Huntington Beach	Garden Grove, CA
G	12	Nici Gilday	5 ft 7 in (1.7 m)	So	Presentation	San Jose, CA
G	13	Telisha Anderson	5 ft 6 in (1.68 m)	Sr	Magnolia	Stanton, CA
F	20	Courtney Lisowski (redshirt)	6 ft 0 in (1.83 m)	Fr	Archbishop Mitty	Los Gatos, CA
G	21	Raquel Avila	5 ft 5 in (1.65 m)	So	St. Ignatius College Prep	S. San Francisco, CA
G	22	Brooke Gallaway	5 ft 11 in (1.8 m)	Fr	Central Valley	Greenacres, WA
G	23	Ashley Armstrong	5 ft 11 in (1.8 m)	Sr	Bishop Manogue	Reno, NV
F	24	Arteivia Lilomaiava	6 ft 0 in (1.83 m)	So	Aragon	San Mateo, CA
G	30	Shelby Swofford	5 ft 10 in (1.78 m)	Jr	Bellarmine Prep	Gig Harbor, WA
F	32	Lindsay Leo	6 ft 2 in (1.88 m)	RS Sr	Archbishop Mitty	San Jose, CA
C	33	Ruta Zurauskyte	6 ft 4 in (1.93 m)	RS Jr	Regis Jesuit	Šiauliai, Lithuania
G	34	Iman Scott	5 ft 9 in (1.75 m)	RS So	Archbishop Mitty	San Jose, CA
F	44	Christina Carlson	6 ft 0 in (1.83 m)	RS So	Bartlett	Bartlett, IL
F/C	45	Vanessa Leo	6 ft 4 in (1.93 m)	RS Fr	Archbishop Mitty	San Jose, CA

Head coach

- Jennifer Mountain (Gonzaga)

Assistant coach(es)

- Marissa White (Chico State University)
- Stacy Clinesmith (UC Santa Barbara)
- Rich Brown (Santa Clara)

Legend

- (C) Team captain
- (S) Suspended
- (I) Ineligible
- (W) Walk-on
- Injured
- Current redshirt

Roster

== Schedule and results ==
Date time, TV	Rank^{#}	Opponent^{#}	Result	Record	Site (attendance) city, state
Exhibition
11/01/2012*; 7:00 pm, Santa Clara on Stretch		UC Santa Cruz	W 90–52	-	Leavey Center (N/A); Santa Clara, CA
11/04/2012*; 7:00 pm, Santa Clara on Stretch		Sonoma State	W 74–54	-	Leavey Center (399); Santa Clara, CA
Regular Season
11/09/2012*; 7:00 pm, Santa Clara on Stretch		UC Irvine	W 77–54	1–0	Leavey Center (626); Santa Clara, CA
11/11/2012*; 2:00 pm, Santa Clara on Stretch		at Stanford	L 57–92	1–1	Leavey Center (2,728); Santa Clara, CA
11/17/2012*; 2:00 pm, Santa Clara on Stretch		Utah Valley	W 80–67	2–1	Leavey Center (402); Santa Clara, CA
11/20/2012*; 2:00 pm		at Pacific	L 45–72	2–2	Alex G. Spanos Center (427); Stockton, CA
11/23/2012*; 4:30 pm		vs. Toledo; John Ascuaga's Nugget Classic	L 48–73	2–3	Lawlor Events Center (1,149); Reno, NV
11/24/2012*; 2:00 pm		vs. Cleveland State; John Ascuaga's Nugget Classic	W 82–71	3–3	Lawlor Events Center (N/A); Reno, NV
11/29/2012*; 7:00 pm, Santa Clara on Stretch		Cal State Northridge	L 67–70	3–4	Leavey Center (529); Santa Clara, CA
12/09/2012*; 2:00 pm		at Long Beach State	W 68–67	4–4	Walter Pyramid (605); Long Beach, CA
12/12/2012*; 7:00 pm		at San Jose State	W 62–47	5–4	Event Center Arena (265); San Jose, CA
12/16/2012*; 9:00 am		at UC Davis	L 59–70	5–5	The Pavilion (330); Davis, CA
12/19/2012*; 7:00 pm		at Cal State Bakersfield	W 77–56	6–5	Icardo Center (245); Bakersfield, CA
12/29/2012*; 2:00 pm, Santa Clara on Stretch		Fresno State	W 58–53	7–5	Leavey Center (583); Santa Clara, CA
12/31/2012*; 1:00 pm, Santa Clara on Stretch		UNLV	W 70–64	8–5	Leavey Center (N/A); Santa Clara, CA
01/03/2013; 7:00 pm, Portland on Stretch		at Portland	W 59–58	9–5 (1–0)	Chiles Center (413); Portland, OR
01/05/2013; 2:00 pm		at Gonzaga	L 50–79	9–6 (1–1)	McCarthey Athletic Center (5,690); Spokane, WA
01/10/2013; 7:00 pm, Santa Clara on Stretch		Loyola Marymount	W 58–54	10–6 (2–1)	Leavey Center (488); Santa Clara, CA
01/17/2013; 7:00 pm, TV-32		at Pepperdine	W 38–36	11–6 (3–1)	Firestone Fieldhouse (227); Malibu, CA
01/19/2013; 2:00 pm, Santa Clara on Stretch		San Francisco	W 61–48	12–6 (4–1)	Leavey Center (416); San Francisco, CA
01/24/2013; 7:00 pm, Santa Clara on Stretch		at Saint Mary's	L 50–56	12–7 (4–2)	Leavey Center (421); Santa Clara, CA
01/26/2013; 2:00 pm, Santa Clara on Stretch		at Portland	L 68–71	12–8 (4–3)	Leavey Center (553); Santa Clara, CA
01/31/2013; 7:00 pm, USD on Stretch		at San Diego	L 48–59	12–9 (4–4)	Jenny Craig Pavilion (368); San Diego, CA
02/02/2013; 2:00 pm, Santa Clara on Stretch		BYU	L 48–65	12–10 (4–5)	Leavey Center (N/A); Santa Clara, CA
02/07/2013; 7:00 pm, LMU All Access		at Loyola Marymount	L 50–71	12–11 (4–6)	Gersten Pavilion (291); Los Angeles, CA
02/09/2013; 2:00 pm, USF on Stretch		at San Francisco	W 69–64	13–11 (5–6)	War Memorial Gymnasium (489); San Francisco, CA
02/14/2013; 7:00 pm, BYUtv		at BYU	L 42–65	13–12 (5–7)	Marriott Center (617); Provo, UT
02/21/2013; 6:00 pm, NBCSN		Gonzaga	L 55–70	13–13 (5–8)	Leavey Center (550); Santa Clara, CA
02/23/2013; 2:00 pm, Santa Clara on Stretch		Pepperdine	W 64–52	14–13 (6–8)	Leavey Center (N/A); Santa Clara, CA
02/28/2013; 7:00 pm, Gaels Insider		at Saint Mary's	L 56–65	14–14 (6–9)	McKeon Pavilion (498); Moraga, CA
03/02/2013; 1:00 pm, Santa Clara on Stretch		San Diego	L 66–84	14–15 (6–10)	Leavey Center (800); Santa Clara, CA
2013 West Coast Conference women's basketball tournament
03/07/2013; 2:30 pm, BYUtv/ WCC Digital		vs. Portland; WCC Tournament 2nd Round	L 64–70	14–16	Orleans Arena (7,896); Las Vegas, NV
*Non-conference game. ^{#}Rankings from AP Poll. (#) Tournament seedings in parentheses. All times are in Pacific Time.

== Rankings ==
+ Regular season polls	Poll	Pre- Season	Week 1	Week 2	Week 3	Week 4	Week 5	Week 6	Week 7	Week 8	Week 9	Week 10	Week 11	Week 12	Week 13	Week 14	Week 15	Week 16	Week 17	Week 18	Final
AP	NR	NR	NR	NR	NR	NR	NR	NR	NR	NR	NR	NR	NR	NR	NR	NR	NR	NR			
Coaches	NR	NR	NR	NR	NR	NR	NR	NR	NR	NR	NR	NR	NR	NR	NR	NR	NR	NR			

Legend
	Increase in ranking
	Decrease in ranking
	No change
(RV)	Received votes
(NR)	Not ranked

== See also ==
- Santa Clara Broncos women's basketball
