= 2012–13 San Francisco Dons women's basketball team =

Intercollegiate basketball season

2012–13 San Francisco Dons women's basketball
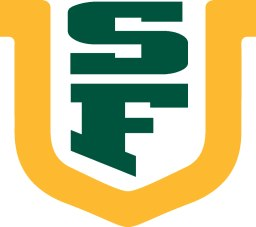
- Conference: West Coast Conference
- Record: 12–19 (4–12 WCC)
- Head coach: Jennifer Azzi (3rd season)
- Assistant coaches: Blair Hardiek; Molly Marrin; Shanele Stires
- Home arena: War Memorial Gymnasium

2012–13 West Coast Conference Women's basketball standings
	Conf.				Overall
Team	W		L	PCT	W		L	PCT
Gonzaga†	15	–	1	.938	27	–	6	.818
San Diego	12	–	4	.750	22	–	10	.688
Saint Mary's	11	–	5	.688	23	–	10	.697
BYU	11	–	5	.688	23	–	11	.676
Loyola Marymount	6	–	10	.375	13	–	18	.419
Santa Clara	6	–	10	.375	14	–	16	.467
Portland	5	–	11	.313	11	–	20	.355
San Francisco	4	–	12	.250	12	–	19	.387
Pepperdine	2	–	14	.125	5	–	23	.179
† 2013 West Coast Conference women's basketball tournament winner As of March 27, 2013; Rankings from AP Poll

The 2012–13 San Francisco Dons women's basketball team represented the University of San Francisco in the 2012–13 college basketball season. This was head coach Jennifer Azzi's third season at San Francisco. The Dons, members of the West Coast Conference, played their home games at the War Memorial Gymnasium and finished the season 12–19, 4–12 in WCC play to finish 8th in the conference.

== Before the season ==
The Dons were picked to finish ninth in the WCC.

== Roster ==
2012–13 San Francisco Dons women's basketball team
Players
Coaches

Pos.	#	Name	Height	Year	Previous school	Hometown
G	1	Zhane Dykes	5 ft 9 in (1.75 m)	—	Fr	Bishop Gorman	Las Vegas, NV
G	2	Taj Winston	5 ft 10 in (1.78 m)	—	So	Long Beach Poly	Long Beach, CA
F	3	Paige Spietz	6 ft 3 in (1.91 m)	—	Jr	Missouri	Brimfield, IL
G	5	Aundrea Gordon	5 ft 7 in (1.7 m)	—	So	McKinney	McKinney, TX
F	12	Byrn Stark	6 ft 0 in (1.83 m)	—	Fr	Bishops' School	La Jolla, CA
G	13	Jamie Katuna	5 ft 7 in (1.7 m)	—	So	Longmont	Longmont, CO
G	21	Alexa Hardick	5 ft 7 in (1.7 m)	—	Jr	Bishop Lynch	Dallas, TX
F	25	Alicia Scafidi	6 ft 1 in (1.85 m)	—	So	Sam Barlow	Gresham, OR
F	32	Taylor Proctor	6 ft 0 in (1.83 m)	—	Fr	Sand Creek	Colorado Springs, CO
F	33	Denae Mary Williams	6 ft 1 in (1.85 m)	—	Fr	Rialto	Rialto, CA
F	34	Whitney Daniels	6 ft 2 in (1.88 m)	—	Sr	Mira Costa	Manhattan Beach, CA
F	44	Bailey Barbour	6 ft 3 in (1.91 m)	—	Sr	Inglewood	Harbor City, CA
G	45	Mel Khlok	5 ft 9 in (1.75 m)	—	RS Sr	John F. Kennedy	Sacramento, CA

Head coach

- Jennifer Azzi (Stanford)

Assistant coach(es)

- Blair Hardiek (Missouri)
- Molly Marrin (Regis University)
- Shanele Stires (Kansas State)

Legend

- (C) Team captain
- (S) Suspended
- (I) Ineligible
- (W) Walk-on
- Injured
- Current redshirt

Roster

== Schedule and results ==
Date time, TV	Rank^{#}	Opponent^{#}	Result	Record	Site (attendance) city, state
Exhibition Season
11/02/2012*; 7:00 pm, USF on Stretch		Missouri Southern State	W 72–40	-	War Memorial Gymnasium (230); San Francisco, CA
Regular Season
11/09/2012*; 7:00 pm, USF on Stretch		Hawaiʻi	W 65–52	1–0	War Memorial Gymnasium (316); San Francisco, CA
11/14/2012*; 7:00 pm, USF on Stretch		UC Davis	W 72–65	2–0	War Memorial Gymnasium (378); San Francisco, CA
11/17/2012*; 2:00 pm		at Cal State Fullerton	L 55–60	2–1	Titan Gym (224); Fullerton, CA
11/21/2012*; 7:00 pm, USF on Stretch		Fordham	L 48–55	2–2	War Memorial Gymnasium (346); San Francisco, CA
11/24/2012*; 1:00 pm, USF on Stretch		Boise State	W 75–61	3–2	War Memorial Gymnasium (350); San Francisco, CA
11/28/2012*; 7:00 pm		at Sacramento State	L 60–68	3–3	Colberg Court (432); Sacramento, CA
12/02/2012*; 12:00 pm		at UTSA	W 61–60 ^{OT}	4–3	Convocation Center (517); San Antonio, TX
12/05/2012*; 5:00 pm		at Cal State Northridge	L 33–77	4–4	Matadome (439); Northridge, CA
12/10/2012*; 7:00 pm, USF on Stretch		Notre Dame de Namur	W 94–43	5–4	War Memorial Gymnasium (377); San Francisco, CA
12/15/2012*; 2:00 pm, USF on Stretch		San Jose State	W 92–64	6–4	War Memorial Gymnasium (377); San Francisco, CA
12/18/2012*; 7:00 pm		at Cal Poly	W 71–67	7–4	Mott Gym (186); San Luis Obispo, CA
12/21/2012*; 5:00 pm, USF on Stretch		Fresno State	L 63–72	7–5	War Memorial Gymnasium (298); San Francisco, CA
12/29/2012*; 4:00 pm		at Pacific	L 59–75	7–6	Alex G. Spanos Center (456); Stockton, CA
01/03/2013; 7:00 pm, USF on Stretch		Saint Mary's	L 48–68	7–7 (0–1)	War Memorial Gymnasium (405); San Francisco, CA
01/05/2013; 1:00 pm, BYUtv		at BYU	L 58–80	7–8 (0–2)	Marriott Center (719); Provo, UT
01/10/2013; 7:00 pm, TV-32		at Pepperdine	L 67–71	7–9 (0–3)	Firestone Fieldhouse (347); Malibu, CA
01/12/2013; 2:00 pm, USF on Stretch		Portland	W 88–81	8–9 (1–3)	War Memorial Gymnasium (253); San Francisco, CA
01/17/2013; 7:00 pm, LMU All Access		at Loyola Marymount	L 50–65	8–10 (1–4)	Gersten Pavilion (252); Los Angeles, CA
01/19/2013; 2:00 pm, Santa Clara on Stretch		at Santa Clara	L 48–61	8–11 (1–5)	Leavey Center (416); Santa Clara, CA
01/26/2013; 2:00 pm, USF on Stretch		BYU	W 65–56	9–11 (2–5)	War Memorial Gymnasium (557); San Francisco, CA
01/28/2013; 7:00 pm, Gaels Insider		at Saint Mary's	L 63–68	9–12 (2–6)	McKeon Pavilion (390); Moraga, CA
02/02/2013; 2:00 pm, USF on Stretch		San Diego	L 61–63	9–13 (2–7)	War Memorial Gymnasium (555); San Francisco, CA
02/07/2013; 7:00 pm, USF on Stretch		Gonzaga	L 46–84	9–14 (2–8)	War Memorial Gymnasium (308); San Francisco, CA
02/09/2013; 2:00 pm, USF on Stretch		Santa Clara	L 64–69	9–15 (2–9)	War Memorial Gymnasium (489); San Francisco, CA
02/14/2013; 7:00 pm, Portland on Stretch		at Portland	W 75–71	10–15 (3–9)	Chiles Center (397); Portland, OR
02/16/2013; 2:00 pm, Zags Sports Channel		at Gonzaga	L 65–101	10–16 (3–10)	McCarthey Athletic Center (6,000); Spokane, WA
02/23/2013; 2:00 pm, USD on Stretch		at San Diego	L 52–62	10–17 (3–11)	Jenny Craig Pavilion (1,352); San Diego, CA
02/28/2013; 7:00 pm, USF on Stretch		Pepperdine	W 67–57	11–17 (4–11)	War Memorial Gymnasium (375); San Francisco, CA
03/02/2013; 2:00 pm, USF on Stretch		Loyola Marymount	L 55–58	11–18 (4–12)	War Memorial Gymnasium (566); San Francisco, CA
2013 West Coast Conference women's basketball tournament
03/06/2013; 3:00 pm, BYUtv/ WCC Digital		vs. Pepperdine; WCC Tournament 1st Round	W 80–48	12–18	Orleans Arena (7,896); Las Vegas, NV
03/07/2013; 12:00 pm, BYUtv/ WCC Digital		vs. Loyola Marymount; WCC Tournament 2nd Round	L 53–75	12–19	Orleans Arena; Las Vegas, NV
*Non-conference game. ^{#}Rankings from AP Poll. (#) Tournament seedings in parentheses. All times are in Pacific Time.

== Rankings ==
+ Regular season polls	Poll	Pre- Season	Week 1	Week 2	Week 3	Week 4	Week 5	Week 6	Week 7	Week 8	Week 9	Week 10	Week 11	Week 12	Week 13	Week 14	Week 15	Week 16	Week 17	Week 18	Final
AP	NR	NR	NR	NR	NR	NR	NR	NR	NR	NR	NR	NR	NR	NR	NR	NR	NR	NR			
Coaches	NR	NR	NR	NR	NR	NR	NR	NR	NR	NR	NR	NR	NR	NR	NR	NR	NR	NR			

Legend
	Increase in ranking
	Decrease in ranking
	No change
(RV)	Received votes
(NR)	Not ranked

== See also ==
- 2012–13 San Francisco Dons men's basketball team
- San Francisco Dons women's basketball
