= 2012–13 Pepperdine Waves women's basketball team =

Intercollegiate basketball season

2012–13 Pepperdine Waves women's basketball
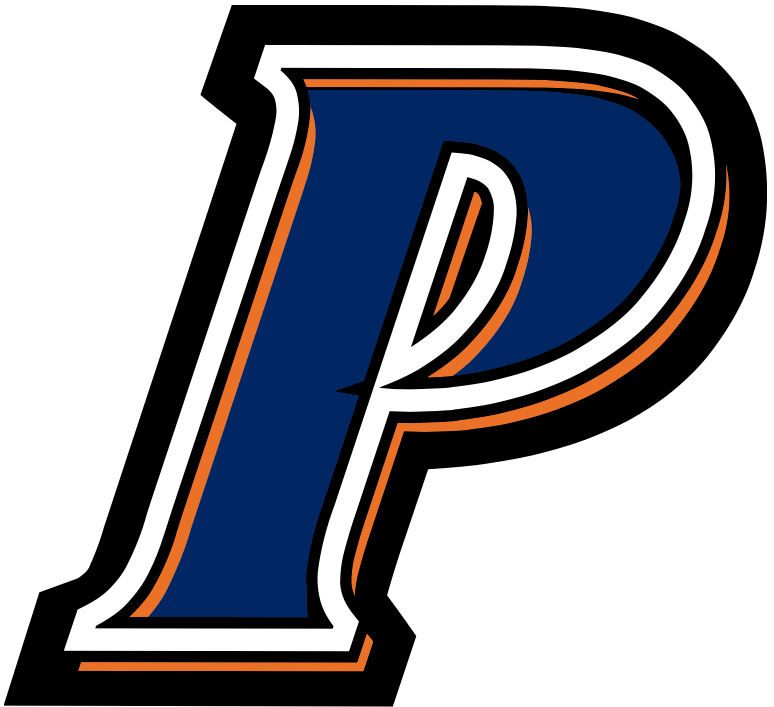
- Conference: West Coast Conference
- Record: 5–23 (2–14 WCC)
- Head coach: Julie Rousseau (9th season)
- Assistant coaches: Darryl Brown; Jordan Adams-Smith; Ryan Weisenberg
- Home arena: Firestone Fieldhouse

2012–13 West Coast Conference Women's basketball standings
	Conf.				Overall
Team	W		L	PCT	W		L	PCT
Gonzaga†	15	–	1	.938	27	–	6	.818
San Diego	12	–	4	.750	22	–	10	.688
Saint Mary's	11	–	5	.688	23	–	10	.697
BYU	11	–	5	.688	23	–	11	.676
Loyola Marymount	6	–	10	.375	13	–	18	.419
Santa Clara	6	–	10	.375	14	–	16	.467
Portland	5	–	11	.313	11	–	20	.355
San Francisco	4	–	12	.250	12	–	19	.387
Pepperdine	2	–	14	.125	5	–	23	.179
† 2013 West Coast Conference women's basketball tournament winner As of March 27, 2013; Rankings from AP Poll

The 2012–13 Pepperdine Waves women's basketball team represented Pepperdine University in the 2012–13 college basketball season. The Waves, members of the West Coast Conference, were led by head coach Julie Rousseau, in her 9th and final season at the school. The Waves played their home games at the Firestone Fieldhouse on the university campus in Malibu, California. They finished the season 5-23, 2–14 in conference, and were 9th place in the conference standings. They lost in the first round of the WCC Tournament to conclude their season and the coaching career of Rousseau at Pepperdine. Rousseau would resign on April 3, 2013, after compiling a 123–144 record at Pepperdine with 3 NCAA Tournament appearances.

== Before the season ==
The Waves were picked to finish fifth in the WCC Pre-Season poll.

== Roster ==
2012–13 Pepperdine Waves women's basketball team
Players
Coaches

Pos.	#	Name	Height	Year	Previous school	Hometown
F	1	Robie Mayberry	5 ft 11 in (1.8 m)	Jr	Bishop O'Dowd	San Leandro, CA
G	4	Grace Leah Baughn	5 ft 11 in (1.8 m)	So	Wesleyan School	Norcross, GA
G	5	Alisha Roberts	5 ft 7 in (1.7 m)	Fr	York House School	Burnaby, British Columbia
G	10	Bria Richardson	5 ft 8 in (1.73 m)	So	Serra	Hawthorne, CA
G	11	Ea Shoushtari	5 ft 8 in (1.73 m)	So	Los Angeles Center for Enriched Studies	Los Angeles, CA
F	12	Kelsey Patrick	6 ft 1 in (1.85 m)	Sr	Kamiak	Mukilteo, WA
F	15	Amanda Lovely	6 ft 1 in (1.85 m)	Fr	Archbishop Mitty	Palo Alto, CA
C	20	Jade McNorton	6 ft 3 in (1.91 m)	RS Jr	Centennial	Boise, ID
G	22	Shay Cooney-Williams	5 ft 6 in (1.68 m)	Sr	Frisco	Frisco, TX
F/C	25	Tessa Emerson	6 ft 2 in (1.88 m)	So	Santa Barbara	Santa Barbara, CA
C	32	Erica Chandler	6 ft 4 in (1.93 m)	Jr	Ardrey Kell High School; George Washington	Charlotte, NC
F	44	Kelsey Brockway	6 ft 1 in (1.85 m)	Fr	Palos Verdes	Rolling Hills, CA
G/F	51	Keitra Wallace	5 ft 11 in (1.8 m)	Fr	Brea Olinda	Brea, CA
G	55	Monet McNally	5 ft 10 in (1.78 m)	Fr	LA Baptist	Santa Clarita, CA

Head coach

- Cindy Fisher (Cal State Los Angeles)

Assistant coach(es)

- Darryl Brown (Temple)
- Jordan Smith (New Mexico)
- Ryan Weisenberg (Cal Poly)

Legend

- (C) Team captain
- (S) Suspended
- (I) Ineligible
- (W) Walk-on
- Injured
- Current redshirt

Roster

== Schedule ==
Date time, TV	Rank^{#}	Opponent^{#}	Result	Record	Site (attendance) city, state
Exhibition
10/30/2012*; 7:00 pm, TV-32		Westmont	L 60–67	–	Firestone Fieldhouse (350); Malibu, CA
Non-conference Regular Season
11/09/2012*; 7:00 pm		at UC Davis	W 83–68	1–0	The Pavilion (453); Davis, CA
11/12/2012*; 7:00 pm, TV-32		UC Riverside	L 71–79	1–1	Firestone Fieldhouse (478); Malibu, CA
11/18/2012*; 2:00 pm, USC on Pac-12 Digital		at USC	L 56–65	1–2	Galen Center (567); Los Angeles, CA
11/23/2012*; 3:30 pm, TV-32		South Dakota; Pepperdine Thanksgiving Classic Semi-final	W 70–54	2–2	Firestone Fieldhouse (327); Malibu, CA
11/24/2012*; 3:30 pm, TV-32		Wyoming; Pepperdine Thanksgiving Classic Championship	L 50–72	2–3	Firestone Fieldhouse (347); Malibu, CA
11/27/2012*; 7:00 pm		at Washington	L 51–70	2–4	Alaska Airlines Arena (2,218); Seattle, WA
12/02/2012*; 12:00 pm		at Arkansas	L 39–64	2–5	Bud Walton Arena (1,631); Fayetteville, AR
12/14/2012*; 7:00 pm, TV-32		Seattle	W 70–64	3–5	Firestone Fieldhouse (377); Malibu, CA
12/18/2012*; 7:00 pm, TV-32		Kentucky	L 62–80	3–6	Firestone Fieldhouse (413); Malibu, CA
12/21/2012*; 1:00 pm, TV-32		Howard	L 51–55	3–7	Firestone Fieldhouse (213); Malibu, CA
12/28/2012*; 5:00 pm, TV-32		UCLA	L 47–77	3–8	Firestone Fieldhouse (575); Malibu, CA
WCC Regular Season
01/03/2013; 7:00 pm		at Loyola Marymount	L 47–65	3–9 (0–1)	Gersten Pavilion (279); Los Angeles, CA
01/10/2013; 7:00 pm, TV-32		San Francisco	W 71–67	4–9 (1–1)	Firestone Fieldhouse (347); Malibu, CA
01/12/2013; 1:00 pm		at BYU	L 42–68	4–10 (1–2)	Marriott Center (784); Provo, UT
01/17/2013; 7:00 pm, TV-32		Santa Clara	L 36–38	4–11 (1–3)	Firestone Fieldhouse (227); Malibu, CA
01/19/2013; 2:00 pm		at Saint Mary's	L 61–72	4–12 (1–4)	McKeon Pavilion (688); Moraga, CA
01/24/2013; 7:00 pm, TV-32		Gonzaga	L 46–80	4–13 (1–5)	Firestone Fieldhouse (277); Malibu, CA
01/26/2013; 2:00 pm, TV-32		San Diego	L 61–79	4–14 (1–6)	Firestone Fieldhouse (244); Malibu, CA
01/31/2013; 7:00 pm		at Portland	L 51–57	4–15 (1–7)	Chiles Center (430); Portland, OR
02/02/2013; 2:00 pm, SWX		at Gonzaga	L 52–81	4–16 (1–8)	McCarthey Athletic Center (6,000); Spokane, WA
02/09/2013; 2:00 pm, TV-32		Portland	L 34–73	4–17 (1–9)	Firestone Fieldhouse (277); Malibu, CA
02/11/2013; 7:00 pm		at San Diego	L 50–71	4–18 (1–10)	Jenny Craig Pavilion (555); San Diego, CA
02/16/2013; 2:00 pm, TV-32		BYU	L 44–67	4–19 (1–11)	Firestone Fieldhouse (212); Malibu, CA
02/21/2013; 7:00 pm, TV-32		Loyola Marymount	L 56–58	4–20 (1–12)	Firestone Fieldhouse (213); Malibu, CA
02/23/2013; 2:00 pm		at Santa Clara	L 52–64	4–21 (1–13)	Leavey Center (N/A); Santa Clara, CA
02/28/2013; 7:00 pm		at San Francisco	L 57–67	4–22 (1–14)	War Memorial Gymnasium (375); San Francisco, CA
03/02/2013; 2:00 pm, TV-32		Saint Mary's	W 80–76	5–22 (2–14)	Firestone Fieldhouse (276); Malibu, CA
2013 West Coast Conference women's basketball tournament
03/06/2013; 3:00 pm, BYUtv/ WCC Digital		vs. San Francisco; WCC Tournament 1st Round	L 48–80	5–23	Orleans Arena (7,896); Las Vegas, NV
*Non-conference game. ^{#}Rankings from AP Poll. (#) Tournament seedings in parentheses. All times are in Pacific Time.

== Rankings ==
+ Regular season polls	Poll	Pre- Season	Week 1	Week 2	Week 3	Week 4	Week 5	Week 6	Week 7	Week 8	Week 9	Week 10	Week 11	Week 12	Week 13	Week 14	Week 15	Week 16	Week 17	Week 18	Final
AP	NR	NR	NR	NR	NR	NR	NR	NR	NR	NR	NR	NR	NR	NR	NR	NR	NR	NR			
Coaches	NR	NR	NR	NR	NR	NR	NR	NR	NR	NR	NR	NR	NR	NR	NR	NR	NR	NR			

Legend
	Increase in ranking
	Decrease in ranking
	No change
(RV)	Received votes
(NR)	Not ranked
