= 2012–13 Portland Pilots women's basketball team =

Intercollegiate basketball season

2012–13 Portland Pilots women's basketball
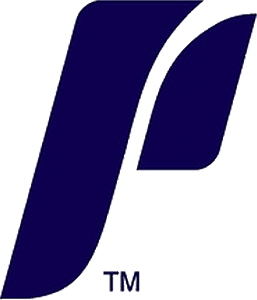
- Conference: West Coast Conference
- Record: 11–20 (5–11 WCC)
- Head coach: Jim Sollars (26th season)
- Assistant coaches: Sean Kelly; Cheryl Sorenson; Jazmine Foreman
- Home arena: Chiles Center

2012–13 West Coast Conference Women's basketball standings
	Conf.				Overall
Team	W		L	PCT	W		L	PCT
Gonzaga†	15	–	1	.938	27	–	6	.818
San Diego	12	–	4	.750	22	–	10	.688
Saint Mary's	11	–	5	.688	23	–	10	.697
BYU	11	–	5	.688	23	–	11	.676
Loyola Marymount	6	–	10	.375	13	–	18	.419
Santa Clara	6	–	10	.375	14	–	16	.467
Portland	5	–	11	.313	11	–	20	.355
San Francisco	4	–	12	.250	12	–	19	.387
Pepperdine	2	–	14	.125	5	–	23	.179
† 2013 West Coast Conference women's basketball tournament winner As of March 27, 2013; Rankings from AP Poll

The 2012–13 Portland Pilots women's basketball team represented the University of Portland in the 2012–13 college basketball season. This was head coach Jim Sollars' twenty-sixth season at Portland. The Pilots were members of the West Coast Conference and played their home games at Chiles Center.

== Before the season ==
The Pilots were picked to finish eighth in the WCC.

== Roster ==
2012–13 Portland Pilots women's basketball team
Players
Coaches

Pos.	#	Name	Height	Year	Previous school	Hometown
G	3	Ellen Nurmi	6 ft 0 in (1.83 m)	Fr	Makelanrinteen Lukio	Turku, Finland
G	10	Colleen Olinger	5 ft 8 in (1.73 m)	So	Academy of Notre Dame de Namur	Springfield, PA
F	11	Sara Ines Hernandez	6 ft 1 in (1.85 m)	Fr	Liceo Scientifico Nomentano	Rome, Italy
G	14	Allison Ryan	5 ft 10 in (1.78 m)	Fr	Ponderosa	Cameron Park, CA
G	15	Alexis Byrd	5 ft 10 in (1.78 m)	Jr	Centennial	Las Vegas, NV
G/F	22	Cassandra Brown	6 ft 2 in (1.88 m)	Jr	Clarence Fulton	Vernon, B. C.
G	23	Kari Luttinen	5 ft 10 in (1.78 m)	So	Seattle Prep	Seattle, WA
F	24	Annika Holopainen	6 ft 1 in (1.85 m)	Fr	Makelanrinteen Lukio	Helsinki, Finland
F	30	Cassandra Thompson	6 ft 2 in (1.88 m)	So	Timberlake	Athol, ID
G	32	Jasmine Wooton	5 ft 8 in (1.73 m)	So	Chatsworth	Northridge, CA
F	33	Amy Pupa	6 ft 1 in (1.85 m)	Jr	Ventura	Ventura, CA
C	35	Elyse Snyder	6 ft 3 in (1.91 m)	RS So	Patriot	Riverside, CA
C	40	Erin Boettcher	6 ft 3 in (1.91 m)	RS So	Carondelet; New Mexico	Concord, CA
G	42	Jazmyn Johnson	5 ft 9 in (1.75 m)	Fr	Kingwood Park	Kingwood, TX

Head coach

- Jim Sollars (Centralia)

Assistant coach(es)

- Sean Kelly (Pacific Lutheran)
- Cheryl Sorenson (Washington)
- Jazmine Foreman (BYU)

Legend

- (C) Team captain
- (S) Suspended
- (I) Ineligible
- (W) Walk-on
- Injured
- Current redshirt

Roster

== Schedule and results ==
Date time, TV	Rank^{#}	Opponent^{#}	Result	Record	Site (attendance) city, state
Exhibition
11/05/2012*; 7:00 pm, Portland on Stretch		Concordia-Portland	W 88–51	-	Chiles Center (420); Portland, OR
Regular Season
11/09/2012*; 5:00 pm		at Cal State Northridge	L 51–70	0–1	Matadome (572); Northridge, CA
11/11/2012*; 9:00 am		at Louisville	L 48–95	0–2	KFC Yum! Center (6,423); Louisville, KY
11/16/2012*; 6:00 pm		at Idaho	W 62–56	1–2	Cowan Spectrum (434); Moscow, ID
11/18/2012*; 1:00 pm		at Eastern Washington	L 50–68	1–3	Reese Court (340); Cheney, WA
11/23/2012*; 5:00 pm		at Seattle; Washington Dental Thanksgiving Tournament	L 61–63	1–4	Connolly Center (462); Seattle, WA
11/24/2012*; 6:00 pm		vs. Boston College; Washington Dental Thanksgiving Tournament	L 40–68	1–5	Connolly Center (443); Seattle, WA
11/29/2012*; 5:00 pm, Portland on Stretch		Washington	L 51–70	1–6	Chiles Center (418); Portland, OR
12/02/2012*; 5:00 pm		at Portland State	L 49–64	1–7	Stott Center (751); Portland, OR
12/07/2012*; 7:00 pm, Portland on Stretch		Nevada	W 70–61	2–7	Chiles Center (401); Portland, OR
12/14/2012*; 5:00 pm, Portland on Stretch		Fresno State	W 76–69	3–7	Chiles Center (462); Portland, OR
12/16/2012*; 1:00 pm		at Boise State	W 73–49	4–7	Taco Bell Arena (565); Boise, ID
12/21/2012*; 12:00 pm, Portland on Stretch		Oregon	W 68–49	5–7	Chiles Center (438); Portland, OR
12/29/2012*; 5:15 pm, Portland on Stretch		Portland State	L 61–64	5–8	Chiles Center (379); Portland, OR
01/03/2013; 7:00 pm, Portland on Stretch		Santa Clara	L 58–59	5–9 (0–1)	Chiles Center (413); Portland, OR
01/05/2013; 2:00 pm, Portland on Stretch		San Diego	L 63–69	5–10 (0–2)	Chiles Center (393); Portland, OR
01/12/2013; 2:00 pm, USF on Stretch		at San Francisco	L 81–88	5–11 (0–3)	War Memorial Gymnasium (253); San Francisco, CA
01/14/2013; 7:00 pm, Portland on Stretch		Gonzaga	L 51–82	5–12 (0–4)	Chiles Center (469); Portland, OR
01/19/2013; 2:00 pm, LMU All Access		at Loyola Marymount	W 63–59	6–12 (1–4)	Gersten Pavilion (317 252); Los Angeles, CA
01/24/2013; 7:00 pm, USD on Stretch		at San Diego	L 54–72	6–13 (1–5)	Jenny Craig Pavilion (237); San Diego, CA
01/26/2013; 2:00 pm, Santa Clara on Stretch		at Santa Clara	W 71–68	7–13 (2–5)	Leavey Center (553); Santa Clara, CA
01/31/2013; 7:00 pm, Portland on Stretch		Pepperdine	W 57–51	8–13 (3–5)	Chiles Center (430); Portland, OR
02/02/2013; 2:00 pm, Portland on Stretch		Loyola Marymount	W 65–63	9–13 (4–5)	Chiles Center (483); Portland, OR
02/07/2013; 6:00 pm, Gaels Insider		at Saint Mary's	L 53–58	9–14 (4–6)	McKeon Pavilion (412); Moraga, CA
02/09/2013; 2:00 pm, TV-32		at Pepperdine	W 73–34	10–14 (5–6)	Firestone Fieldhouse (277); Malibu, CA
02/14/2013; 7:00 pm, Portland on Stretch		San Francisco	L 71–75	10–15 (5–7)	Chiles Center (397); Portland, OR
02/16/2013; 7:00 pm, Portland on Stretch		Saint Mary's	L 43–49	10–16 (5–8)	Chiles Center (633); Portland, OR
02/21/2013; 6:00 pm, BYUtv		at BYU	L 64–79	10–17 (5–9)	Marriott Center (664); Provo, UT
02/28/2013; 6:00 pm		at Gonzaga	L 56–59	10–18 (5–10)	McCarthey Athletic Center (6,000); Spokane, WA
03/02/2013; 2:00 pm, Portland on Stretch		BYU	L 63–73	10–19 (5–11)	Chiles Center (563); Portland, OR
2013 West Coast Conference women's basketball tournament
03/07/2013; 2:30 pm, BYUtv/ WCC Digital		vs. Santa Clara; WCC Tournament 2nd Round	W 70–64	11–19	Orleans Arena (7,896); Las Vegas, NV
03/07/2013; 2:30 pm, BYUtv/ WCC Digital		vs. Saint Mary's; WCC Tournament Quarterfinals	L 51–54	11–20	Orleans Arena (7,896); Las Vegas, NV
*Non-conference game. ^{#}Rankings from AP Poll. (#) Tournament seedings in parentheses. All times are in Pacific Time.

== Rankings ==
+ Regular season polls	Poll	Pre- Season	Week 1	Week 2	Week 3	Week 4	Week 5	Week 6	Week 7	Week 8	Week 9	Week 10	Week 11	Week 12	Week 13	Week 14	Week 15	Week 16	Week 17	Week 18	Final
AP	NR	NR	NR	NR	NR	NR	NR	NR	NR	NR	NR	NR	NR	NR	NR	NR	NR	NR			
Coaches	NR	NR	NR	NR	NR	NR	NR	NR	NR	NR	NR	NR	NR	NR	NR	NR	NR	NR			

Legend
	Increase in ranking
	Decrease in ranking
	No change
(RV)	Received votes
(NR)	Not ranked

== See also ==
- Portland Pilots women's basketball
