= 2012–13 San Diego Toreros women's basketball team =

Intercollegiate basketball season

2012–13 San Diego Toreros women's basketball

2012 Air Force Academy Tournament Champions

WNIT, 2nd Round
- Conference: West Coast Conference
- Record: 22–10 (12–4 WCC)
- Head coach: Cindy Fisher (8th season)
- Assistant coaches: Mary Ann Falcosky; Niecee Nelson; Ashley Ford
- Home arena: Jenny Craig Pavilion

2012–13 West Coast Conference Women's basketball standings
| | Conf. | | | | Overall |
| Team | W | | L | PCT | W | | L | PCT |
|---|---|---|---|---|---|---|---|---|
| Gonzaga† | 15 | – | 1 | .938 | 27 | – | 6 | .818 |
| San Diego | 12 | – | 4 | .750 | 22 | – | 10 | .688 |
| Saint Mary's | 11 | – | 5 | .688 | 23 | – | 10 | .697 |
| BYU | 11 | – | 5 | .688 | 23 | – | 11 | .676 |
| Loyola Marymount | 6 | – | 10 | .375 | 13 | – | 18 | .419 |
| Santa Clara | 6 | – | 10 | .375 | 14 | – | 16 | .467 |
| Portland | 5 | – | 11 | .313 | 11 | – | 20 | .355 |
| San Francisco | 4 | – | 12 | .250 | 12 | – | 19 | .387 |
| Pepperdine | 2 | – | 14 | .125 | 5 | – | 23 | .179 |
† 2013 West Coast Conference women's basketball tournament winner As of March 27, 2013; Rankings from AP Poll

The 2012–13 San Diego Toreros women's basketball team represented the University of San Diego in the 2012–13 college basketball season. The Toreros, members of the West Coast Conference, were led by head coach Cindy Fisher, in her 8th season at the school. The Toreros played their home games at the Jenny Craig Pavilion on the university campus in San Diego, California. For the season the Toreros went 22–10, 12–4 in conference, and finished 2nd in the WCC. They qualified for the 2013 Women's National Invitation Tournament where they lost to Utah in the 2nd Round.

== Before the Season ==
The Toreros were picked to finish fourth in the WCC Pre-Season poll.

== Roster ==
2012–13 San Diego Toreros women's basketball team
Players
Coaches

| Pos. | # | Name | Height | Year | Previous school | Hometown |
|---|---|---|---|---|---|---|
| G | 1 | Brooke Jelniker | 6 ft 0 in (1.83 m) | So | ThunderRidge | Highlands Ranch, CO |
| F | 2 | Malina Hood | 5 ft 10 in (1.78 m) | Fr | La Jolla Country Day | San Diego, CA |
| G | 3 | Sophie Ederaine | 5 ft 9 in (1.75 m) | So | Canyon Springs | Moreno Valley, CA |
| G | 5 | Julia Bennett | 5 ft 9 in (1.75 m) | Sr | Pearland | Pearland, TX |
| G | 10 | Amy Kame | 6 ft 0 in (1.83 m) | Jr | Central | Grand Junction, CO |
| F | 11 | Katelyn McDaniel | 6 ft 1 in (1.85 m) | So | Highlands Ranch | Littleton, CO |
| F | 12 | Sophia Ederaine | 6 ft 3 in (1.91 m) | So | Canyon Springs | Moreno Valley, CA |
| G | 13 | Felicia Wijinberg | 6 ft 2 in (1.88 m) | RS Jr | St. Mary's Secondary | Maple Ridge, British Columbia |
| G | 20 | Tara Warren | 5 ft 8 in (1.73 m) | RS Fr | Cy-Fair | Houston, TX |
| F | 21 | Klara Wischer | 6 ft 1 in (1.85 m) | Sr | Methodist Ladies' | Melbourne, Australia |
| F | 22 | Maya Hood | 5 ft 10 in (1.78 m) | Fr | La Jolla Country Day | San Diego, CA |
| G | 23 | Tomisha Miller | 5 ft 5 in (1.65 m) | So | Sacred Heart Cathedral Preparatory | San Francisco, CA |
| G | 33 | Alysse Barlow | 5 ft 4 in (1.63 m) | Jr | Hutchinson | Arlington, TX |
| F | 45 | Kameron Knutson | 6 ft 3 in (1.91 m) | Jr | Dobson | Mesa, AZ |

Head coach

- Cindy Fisher (Eastern Wyoming College)

Assistant coach(es)

- Mary Ann Falcosky (Northern Arizona)
- Niecee Nelson (Concordia)
- Ashley Ford (Nebraska)

Legend

- (C) Team captain
- (S) Suspended
- (I) Ineligible
- (W) Walk-on
- Injured
- Current redshirt

Roster

== Schedule ==
| Date time, TV | Rank^{#} | Opponent^{#} | Result | Record | Site (attendance) city, state |
Exhibition
| 11/05/2012*; 7:00 pm | | San Diego Christian | W 79–38 | – | Jenny Craig Pavilion (N/A); San Diego, CA |
Non-conference Regular Season
| 11/10/2012*; 2:00 pm | | Cal State San Marcos | W 69–44 | 1–0 | Jenny Craig Pavilion (309); San Diego, CA |
| 11/17/2012*; 2:00 pm | | at Cal Poly | L 50–69 | 1–1 | Mott Gym (563); San Luis Obispo, CA |
| 11/23/2012*; 7:00 pm | | Northern Colorado | W 78–34 | 2–1 | Jenny Craig Pavilion (302); San Diego, CA |
| 11/25/2012*; 2:00 pm | | San Jose State | W 91–52 | 3–1 | Jenny Craig Pavilion (N/A); San Diego, CA |
| 11/30/2012*; 7:00 pm | | vs. Boise State; Air Force Academy Tournament | W 77–70 | 4–1 | Clune Arena (213); Colorado Springs, CO |
| 12/01/2012*; 4:30 pm | | at Air Force; Air Force Academy Tournament | W 74–33 | 5–1 | Clune Arena (293); Colorado Springs, CO |
| 12/04/2012*; 7:00 pm | | Point Loma Nazarene | W 81–56 | 6–1 | Jenny Craig Pavilion (N/A); San Diego, CA |
| 12/08/2012*; 3:30 pm, FSSD | | San Diego State | L 54–58 | 6–2 | Jenny Craig Pavilion (2,182); San Diego, CA |
| 12/12/2012*; 11:00 am | | at Arizona State | L 39–72 | 6–3 | Wells Fargo Arena (2,005); Tempe, AZ |
| 12/15/2012*; 2:00 pm | | Long Beach State | W 67–49 | 7–3 | Jenny Craig Pavilion (301); San Diego, CA |
| 12/28/2012*; 6:00 pm | | Central Michigan; Maggie Dixon Surf -N- Turf Classic Semifinals | W 78–72 ^{OT} | 8–3 | Jenny Craig Pavilion (776); San Diego, CA |
| 12/30/2012*; 2:00 pm | | Iowa; Maggie Dixon Surf-N-Turf Championship | L 73–83 | 8–4 | Jenny Craig Pavilion (543); San Diego, CA |
WCC Regular Season
| 01/03/2013; 6:00 pm | | at Gonzaga | L 57–77 | 8–5 (0–1) | McCarthey Athletic Center (5,220); Spokane, WA |
| 01/05/2013; 2:00 pm | | at Portland | W 69–63 | 9–5 (1–1) | Chiles Center (393); Portland, OR |
| 01/10/2013; 7:00 pm | | BYU | L 54–57 ^{OT} | 9–6 (1–2) | Jenny Craig Pavilion (352); San Diego, CA |
| 01/12/2013; 2:00 pm | | Loyola Marymount | W 88–78 ^{OT} | 10–6 (2–2) | Jenny Craig Pavilion (309); San Diego, CA |
| 01/17/2013; 7:00 pm | | at Saint Mary's | W 73–70 | 11–6 (3–2) | McKeon Pavilion (509); Moraga, CA |
| 01/19/2013; 2:00 pm | | Gonzaga | L 50–62 | 11–7 (3–3) | Jenny Craig Pavilion (528); San Diego, CA |
| 01/24/2013; 7:00 pm | | Portland | W 72–54 | 12–7 (4–3) | Jenny Craig Pavilion (237); San Diego, CA |
| 01/26/2013; 2:30 pm, TV-32 | | at Pepperdine | W 79–61 | 13–7 (5–3) | Firestone Fieldhouse (244); Malibu, CA |
| 01/31/2013; 7:00 pm | | Santa Clara | W 59–48 | 14–7 (6–3) | Jenny Craig Pavilion (368); San Diego, CA |
| 02/02/2013; 2:00 pm | | at San Francisco | W 63–61 | 15–7 (7–3) | War Memorial Gymnasium (555); San Francisco, CA |
| 02/07/2013; 7:00 pm, BYUtv | | at BYU | L 48–53 | 15–8 (7–4) | Marriott Center (528); Provo, UT |
| 02/11/2013; 7:00 pm | | at Pepperdine | W 71–50 | 16–8 (8–4) | Jenny Craig Pavilion (555); San Diego, CA |
| 02/14/2013; 7:00 pm | | at Loyola Marymount | W 66–59 | 17–8 (9–4) | Gersten Pavilion (221); Los Angeles, CA |
| 02/21/2013; 7:00 pm | | Saint Mary's | W 67–50 | 18–8 (10–4) | Jenny Craig Pavilion (363); San Diego, CA |
| 02/23/2013; 2:00 pm | | San Francisco | W 62–52 | 19–8 (11–4) | Jenny Craig Pavilion (1,352); San Diego, CA |
| 03/02/2013; 1:00 pm | | at Santa Clara | W 84–66 | 20–8 (12–4) | Leavey Center (800); Santa Clara, CA |
2013 West Coast Conference women's basketball tournament
| 03/09/2013; 2:30 pm, BYUtv/ WCC Digital | | vs. Saint Mary's; WCC Tournament Semifinals | W 74–53 | 21–8 | Orleans Arena (7,896); Las Vegas, NV |
| 03/11/2013; 1:00 pm, ESPNU | | vs. Gonzaga; WCC Tournament Championship | L 50–62 | 21–9 | Orleans Arena (7,896); Las Vegas, NV |
2013 Women's National Invitation Tournament
| 03/21/2013*; 6:00 pm | | Hawaii; WNIT Tournament 1st Round | W 61–49 | 22–9 | Jenny Craig Pavilion (203); San Diego, CA |
| 03/25/2013*; 6:00 pm, Pac-12 Digital | | Utah; WNIT Tournament 2nd Round | L 50–61 | 22–10 | Huntsman Center (517); Salt Lake City, UT |
*Non-conference game. ^{#}Rankings from AP Poll. (#) Tournament seedings in parentheses. All times are in Pacific Time.

== Rankings ==
| + Regular season polls | Poll | Pre- Season | Week 1 | Week 2 | Week 3 | Week 4 | Week 5 | Week 6 | Week 7 | Week 8 | Week 9 | Week 10 | Week 11 | Week 12 | Week 13 | Week 14 | Week 15 | Week 16 | Week 17 | Week 18 | Final |
| AP | NR | NR | NR | NR | NR | NR | NR | NR | NR | NR | NR | NR | NR | NR | NR | NR | NR | NR | | | |
| Coaches | NR | NR | NR | NR | NR | NR | NR | NR | NR | NR | NR | NR | NR | NR | NR | NR | NR | NR | | | |

Legend
| | Increase in ranking |
| | Decrease in ranking |
| | No change |
| (RV) | Received votes |
| (NR) | Not ranked |
