= 2012–13 West Coast Conference men's basketball season =

- League: NCAA Division I
- Sport: Basketball
- Teams: 9
- TV partner(s): (national) ESPN2, ESPNU, BYUtv, (regional) FSSD, CSNNW, CSNBA, CSNCA, ROOT NW, ROOT RM, TWCSN

Regular season
- Season champions: Gonzaga
- Runners-up: Saint Mary's
- Season MVP: Kelly Olynyk, Gonzaga

Tournament
- Champions: Gonzaga
- Runners-up: Saint Mary's
- Finals MVP: Elias Harris, Gonzaga

Basketball seasons
- ← 11–12 13–14 →

2012–13 West Coast Conference men's basketball standings
| | Conf. | | | | Overall |
| Team | W | | L | PCT | W | | L | PCT |
|---|---|---|---|---|---|---|---|---|
| No. 1 Gonzaga† | 16 | – | 0 | 1.000 | 32 | – | 3 | .914 |
| Saint Mary's | 14 | – | 2 | .875 | 28 | – | 7 | .800 |
| BYU | 10 | – | 6 | .625 | 24 | – | 12 | .667 |
| Santa Clara | 9 | – | 7 | .563 | 26 | – | 12 | .684 |
| San Francisco | 7 | – | 9 | .438 | 15 | – | 16 | .484 |
| San Diego | 7 | – | 9 | .438 | 16 | – | 18 | .471 |
| Pepperdine | 4 | – | 12 | .250 | 12 | – | 18 | .400 |
| Portland | 4 | – | 12 | .250 | 11 | – | 21 | .344 |
| Loyola Marymount | 1 | – | 15 | .063 | 11 | – | 23 | .324 |
† Conference tournament winner Rankings from AP poll

The 2012–13 West Coast Conference men's basketball season began with practices in October 2012 and ended with the 2013 West Coast Conference men's basketball tournament at the Orleans Arena March 6–11, 2013 in Las Vegas. The regular season began in November, with the conference schedule starting at the end of December.

This was the 62nd season for the conference, and the 24th under its current name as "West Coast Conference". The conference began as the California Basketball Association in 1952, became the West Coast Athletic Conference in 1956, and dropped the word "Athletic" in 1989. After having no changes from 1980 until 2011, the conference will have its second change in three years in 2013. Original conference founder, and a fellow faith-based, private school Pacific will rejoin the conference. Pacific will come from the Big West.

== Pre-season ==
- Pre-season media day was scheduled Monday, October 29, and took place at the Time Warner Cable SportsNet and Time Warner Cable Deportes Studios. Barry Tompkins hosted video interviews through WCCSports.com and Youtube.com beginning at 11:30 AM PDT. Jeff Lampe of WCC Live will also interviewed each coach and get a preview of their respective season. The regional television schedule announcement, the Pre-season Conference team, and the pre-season coaches rankings were some of the additional events that took place.

=== 2012–13 West Coast Men's Basketball Media Poll ===
Rank, School (first-place votes), Points
1. Gonzaga (7), 63
2. BYU (1), 55
3. St. Mary's (1), 52
4. Loyola Marymount, 37
5. San Diego, 36
6. Santa Clara, 35
7. San Francisco, 19
8. Portland, 15
9. Pepperdine, 12

=== 2012–13 West Coast Men's Preseason All-West Conference Team ===
Player, School, Yr., Pos.
Gary Bell, Jr., Gonzaga, So., G
Brandon Davies, BYU, Sr., F
Johnny Dee, San Diego, So, G
Matthew Dellavedova, Saint Mary's, Sr., G
Sam Dower, Gonzaga, R-Jr., C
Kevin Foster, Santa Clara, Sr., G
Elias Harris, Gonzaga, Sr., F
Stephen Holt, Saint Mary's, Jr., G
Anthony Ireland, Loyola Marymount, Jr., G
Kevin Pangos, Gonzaga, So., G

== Rankings ==
Legend
| | Improvement in ranking |
| | Drop in ranking |
| RV | Received votes but were not ranked in Top 25 of poll |

| | | Pre/ Wk 1 | Wk 2 | Wk 3 | Wk 4 | Wk 5 | Wk 6 | Wk 7 | Wk 8 | Wk 9 | Wk 10 | Wk 11 | Wk 12 | Wk 13 | Wk 14 | Wk 15 | Wk 16 | Wk 17 | Wk 18 | Wk 19 | Final |
|---|---|---|---|---|---|---|---|---|---|---|---|---|---|---|---|---|---|---|---|---|---|
| BYU | AP | | | | | | | | | | | | | | | | | | | | |
| BYU | C | | | | | | | | | | | | | | | | | | | | |
| Gonzaga | AP | 21 | 19 | 17 | 12 | 10 | 14 | 14 | 13 | 10 | 9 | 8 | 10 | 7 | 6 | 5 | 3 | 2 | 1 | 1 | |
| Gonzaga | C | 22 | 19 | 16 | 12 | 10 | 14 | 14 | 13 | 10 | 8 | 8 | 10 | 7 | 6 | 3 | 3 | 2 | 1 | 1 | |
| Loyola Marymount | AP | | | | | | | | | | | | | | | | | | | | |
| Loyola Marymount | C | | | | | | | | | | | | | | | | | | | | |
| Pepperdine | AP | | | | | | | | | | | | | | | | | | | | |
| Pepperdine | C | | | | | | | | | | | | | | | | | | | | |
| Portland | AP | | | | | | | | | | | | | | | | | | | | |
| Portland | C | | | | | | | | | | | | | | | | | | | | |
| Saint Mary's | AP | RV | RV | RV | | | | | | | | | | RV | RV | RV | RV | RV | RV | RV | RV |
| Saint Mary's | C | RV | RV | RV | RV | | | | | | | | | RV | RV | RV | RV | 23 | 23 | 21 | 25 |
| San Diego | AP | | | | | | | | | | | | | | | | | | | | |
| San Diego | C | | | | | | | | | | | | | | | | | | | | |
| San Francisco | AP | | | | | | | | | | | | | | | | | | | | |
| San Francisco | C | | | | | | | | | | | | | | | | | | | | |
| Santa Clara | AP | | | | | | | | | | | | | | | | | | | | |
| Santa Clara | C | | | | | | | | | | | | | | | | | | | | |

== Non-Conference games ==
- Gonzaga won the 2012 Old Spice Classic.
- Saint Mary's finished 3rd at the DirecTV Classic.

== Conference games ==
=== Composite Matrix ===
This table summarizes the head-to-head results between teams in conference play. (x) indicates games remaining this season.

| | BYU | Gonzaga | LMU | Pepperdine | Portland | Saint Mary's | San Diego | San Francisco | Santa Clara |
|---|---|---|---|---|---|---|---|---|---|
| vs. Brigham Young | – | 2-0 | 0–2 | 0–2 | 0–2 | 2–0 | 1–1 | 1–1 | 0-2 |
| vs. Gonzaga | 0–2 | – | 0–2 | 0–2 | 0–2 | 0–2 | 0–2 | 0–2 | 0–2 |
| vs. Loyola Marymount | 2–0 | 2–0 | – | 2–0 | 2–0 | 2–0 | 2–0 | 2–0 | 1–1 |
| vs. Pepperdine | 2–0 | 2–0 | 0–2 | – | 0–2 | 2–0 | 1–0 | 2–0 | 2–0 |
| vs. Portland | 2–0 | 2–0 | 0–2 | 2–0 | – | 2–0 | 1–1 | 1–1 | 2–0 |
| vs. Saint Mary's | 0–2 | 2–0 | 0–2 | 0–2 | 0–2 | – | 0–2 | 0–2 | 0–2 |
| vs. San Diego | 1–1 | 2–0 | 0–2 | 0–2 | 1–1 | 2–0 | – | 0–2 | 2–0 |
| vs. San Francisco | 1–1 | 2–0 | 0–2 | 0–2 | 1–1 | 2–0 | 2–0 | – | 2–0 |
| vs. Santa Clara | 2–0 | 2–0 | 1–0 | 0–2 | 0–2 | 2–0 | 0–2 | 0–2 | – |
| Total | 10–6 | 16–0 | 1–15 | 4–12 | 4–12 | 14–2 | 7–9 | 7–9 | 9–7 |

== Conference tournament ==
- March 6–11, 2013– West Coast Conference Basketball Tournament, Orleans Arena, Las Vegas, NV.

== Bracket ==
First round Wednesday, March 6 BYUtv
8 | Portland | 54
9 | Loyola Marymount | 65

Second round Thursday, March 7 BYUtv
1 | Gonzaga
(bye)
4 | Santa Clara
(bye)
5 | San Francisco | 60
9 | Loyola Marymount | 61^{OT}
2 | Saint Mary's
(bye)
3 | BYU
(bye)
6 | San Diego | 62
7 | Pepperdine | 59

Quarterfinals; Friday, March 8 ESPNU
1 | Gonzaga
(bye)
4 | Santa Clara | 58
9 | Loyola Marymount | 60
2 | Saint Mary's
(bye)
3 | BYU | 69
6 | San Diego | 72

Semifinals; Saturday, March 9 ESPN2
1 | Gonzaga | 66
9 | Loyola Marymount | 48
2 | Saint Mary's | 69
6 | San Diego | 66^{OT}

Championship; Monday, March 11; ESPN
1 | Gonzaga | 65
2 | Saint Mary's | 51

All times listed are Pacific

== Head coaches ==
Dave Rose, BYU
Mark Few, Gonzaga
Max Good, Loyola Marymount
Marty Wilson, Pepperdine
Eric Reveno, Portland
Randy Bennett, Saint Mary's
Bill Grier, San Diego
Rex Walters, San Francisco
Kerry Keating, Santa Clara

== Postseason ==
=== NCAA tournament ===
| Seed | Bracket | School | First round | Second round | Third round | Sweet 16 | Elite 8 | Final Four | Championship |
|---|---|---|---|---|---|---|---|---|---|
| 1 | West | Gonzaga | | #16 Southern University - Mar. 21, Salt Lake City - W, 64–58 | #9 Wichita State - Mar. 23, Salt Lake City - L, 70–76 | | | | |
| 11 | Midwest | Saint Mary's | #11 Middle Tennessee - Mar. 19, Dayton - W, 67–54 | #6 Memphis - Mar. 21, Auburn Hills - L, 52–54 | | | | | |
| | 2 Bids | W-L (%): | 1–0 1.000 | 1–1 .500 | 0–1 .000 | 0–0 – | 0–0 – | 0–0 – | TOTAL: 3–2 .600 |

=== NIT ===
| Seed | Bracket | School | First round | Second round | Quarterfinals | Semifinals | Finals |
|---|---|---|---|---|---|---|---|
| 3 | Southern Miss | BYU | #6 Washington - Mar. 20, Provo - W, 90-79 | #7 Mercer - Mar. 22, Provo - W, 90–71 | #1 Southern Miss - Mar. 27, Hattiesburg - W, 79–62 | #2 Baylor - Apr. 2, New York - , 70–76 | |
| | 1 Bid | W-L (%): | 1–0 1.000 | 1–0 1.000 | 1–0 1.000 | 0–1 .000 | TOTAL: 3–1 .750 |

=== CBI ===
| School | First round | Quarterfinals | Semifinals | Finals Game 1 | Finals Game 2 | Finals Game 3 |
|---|---|---|---|---|---|---|
| Santa Clara | Vermont; Mar. 19, Santa Clara; W, 77-67 | Purdue; Mar. 25, West Lafayette; W 86-83 | Wright State; Mar. 27, Dayton; W, 81-69 | George Mason; Apr. 1, Santa Clara; W, 81-73 | George Mason; Apr. 3, Fairfax; L, 66-73 | George Mason; APR. 5, Fairfax; W, 80-77 |
| TOTAL W-L (%): 5–1 .833 | 1–0 1.000 | 1–0 1.000 | 1–0 1.000 | 1–0 1.000 | 0–1 .000 | 1–0 1.000 |

== Highlights and notes ==
- The Santa Clara Broncos won the 2013 College Basketball Invitational Tournament

== Awards and honors ==
=== WCC Player-of-the-Week ===
- Nov. 12 – Kevin Foster, G, Santa Clara
- Nov. 26 – Elias Harris, F, Gonzaga
- Dec. 10 – Johnny Dee, G, San Diego
- Dec. 24 – Marc Trasolini, F, Santa Clara
- Jan. 7 – Kelly Olynyk, F, Gonzaga
- Jan. 21 – Kevin Foster, G, Santa Clara
- Feb. 4 – Matt Carlino, G, BYU
- Feb. 18 – Kelly Olynyk, F, Gonzaga
- Mar. 4 - Cole Dickerson, F, San Francisco
- Nov. 19 – Johnny Dee, G, San Diego
- Dec. 3 – Cole Dickerson, F, San Francisco
- Dec. 17 – Brandon Davies, F, BYU
- Dec. 31 – Tyler Haws, G, BYU
- Jan. 14 – Tyler Haws, G, BYU
- Jan. 28 – Beau Levesque, F, Saint Mary's
- Feb. 11 –De'End Parker, G, San Francisco
- Feb. 25 – Matthew Dellavedova, G, Saint Mary's

=== College Madness West Coast Player of the Week ===
- Nov. 12 – Przemek Karnowski, C, Gonzaga
- Nov. 26 – Elias Harris, F, Gonzaga
- Dec. 10 – Jordan Baker, G, Pepperdine
- Dec. 24 – Marc Trasolini, F, Santa Clara
- Jan. 7 – Kelly Olynyk, F, Gonzaga (Also High Major Player of the Week)
- Jan. 21 – Matthew Dellavedova, G, Saint Mary's
- Feb. 4 – Matt Carlino, G, BYU
- Feb. 18 – Kelly Olynyk, F, Gonzaga
- Mar. 4 -
- Nov. 19 – Kevin Foster, G, Santa Clara
- Dec. 3 – Cole Dickerson, F, San Francisco
- Dec. 17 – Kelly Olynyk, F, Gonzaga
- Dec. 31 – Tyler Haws, G, BYU (Also High Major Player of the Week)
- Jan. 14 – Tyler Haws, G, BYU
- Jan. 28 – Beau Levesque, F, Saint Mary's
- Feb. 11 – De'End Parker, G, San Francisco
- Feb. 25 – Matthew Dellavedova, G, Saint Mary's

=== Player-of-the-Month ===
- November – Kevin Foster, G, Santa Clara
- December – Kelly Olynyk, F, Gonzaga
- January – Kelly Olynyk, F, Gonzaga
- February –

=== All West Coast Conference teams ===
Voting was by conference coaches:

- Player of The Year: Kelly Olynyk, Gonzaga
- Newcomer of The Year: Stacy Davis, Pepperdine
- Defensive Player of The Year: Mike Hart, Gonzaga
- Coach of The Year: Mark Few, Gonzaga

=== All-Conference ===
| Player | School | Year | Position |
|---|---|---|---|
| Brandon Davies | BYU | Sr | F |
| Matthew Dellavedova | Saint Mary's | Sr | G |
| Cole Dickerson | San Francisco | Jr | F |
| Kevin Foster | Santa Clara | Sr | G |
| Elias Harris | Gonzaga | Sr | F |
| Tyler Haws | BYU | So | G |
| Anthony Ireland | Loyola Marymount | Jr | G |
| Kelly Olynyk | Gonzaga | Jr | F |
| Kevin Pangos | Gonzaga | So | G |
| Marc Trasolini | Santa Clara | Sr | F |

=== Honorable Mention ===
| Name | School |
|---|---|
| Christopher Anderson | San Diego |
| Jordan Baker | Pepperdine |
| Gary Bell Jr. | Gonzaga |
| Stacy Davis | Pepperdine |
| Johnny Dee | San Diego |
| Cody Doolin | San Francisco |
| Stephen Holt | Saint Mary's |
| Lorne Jackson | Pepperdine |
| Ryan Nicholas | Portland |

=== All-Freshman ===
| Player | School | Position |
|---|---|---|
| Stacy Davis | Pepperdine | F |
| Tim Derksen | San Francisco | F |
| Avry Holmes | San Francisco | G |
| Przemek Karnowski | Gonzaga | C |
| Jito Kok | San Diego | C |

=== All-Academic ===
| Player | School | Year | GPA | Major |
|---|---|---|---|---|
| Johnny Dee | San Diego | So | 3.49 | Undeclared |
| Matthew Dellavedova | Saint Mary's | Sr | 3.40 | Psychology |
| Ashley Hamilton | Loyola Marymount | GS (Note: Hamilton, Hart, and Trasolini are redshirt seniors for athletic purposes.) | 4.00 | Education |
| Mike Hart | Gonzaga | GS | 3.70 | MBA |
| Beau Levesque | Saint Mary's | Jr | 3.78 | Sports Management |
| Ryan Nicholas | Portland | Jr | 3.47 | Psychology |
| Kelly Olynyk | Gonzaga | GS (Note: Olynyk is a redshirt junior for athletic purposes.) | 3.53 | MBA |
| Marc Trasolini | Santa Clara | GS | 3.65 | MBA |
| Thomas van der Mars | Portland | So | 3.94 | Operations Technology Management |

== See also ==
- 2012-13 NCAA Division I men's basketball season
- West Coast Conference men's basketball tournament
- 2012–13 West Coast Conference women's basketball season
- West Coast Conference women's basketball tournament
- 2013 West Coast Conference women's basketball tournament
