= Charity Elliott =

American basketball coach

Current position
- Title: Head coach
- Team: Point Loma
- Conference: Pacific West Conference

Biographical details
- Born: October 11, 1969 (age 56)

Playing career
- 1987–1989: Rice
- 1990–1992: Southwest Missouri State
- Position: Guard

Coaching career (HC unless noted)
- 1992–1993: Glendale HS (frosh)
- 1993–1994: San Diego State (asst.)
- 1994–1996: Southwest Missouri State (asst.)
- 1996–1999: Southwest Baptist (asst.)
- 1999–2000: South Adelaide
- 2001–2003: California Baptist
- 2003–2004: Arkansas (asst.)
- 2004–2007: Portland State
- 2007–2012: UC San Diego
- 2012–2021: Loyola Marymount
- 2021–present: Point Loma

Head coaching record
- Overall: 258–236 (.522)
- Tournaments: 4–4 (NCAA D-II); 0-1 (WNIT)

Accomplishments and honors

Awards
- 3× CCAA Coach of the Year (2009, 2010, 2012); WBCA West Region Coach of the Year (2012)

Charity Dawn Elliott (née Shira; born November 11, 1969) is an American basketball coach currently serving as the head women's basketball coach at Point Loma Nazarene University. She was the women's basketball team head coach at Loyola Marymount University from 2012 to 2021. She has previously been the women's head basketball coach at Portland State, UC San Diego, and California Baptist.

== Playing career ==
After attending Fair Grove High School in Fair Grove, Missouri, Elliott began playing college basketball as a guard at Rice University. As a freshman (1987–88), Elliott averaged 7.1 points and 4.3 rebounds. The following season, she averaged 16.8 points and 5.7 rebounds.

In 1989, Elliott transferred to Southwest Missouri State University (now Missouri State). After redshirting a year per NCAA transfer rules, Elliott averaged 7.1 points and 2.5 rebounds in the 1990–91 season. In her senior season in 1991–92, Elliott averaged 8.4 points and 2.3 rebounds and helped Southwest Missouri State to a 31–3 record and its first Final Four appearance in school history. Elliott ranked in the top 10 nationally in field goal percentage. Elliott graduated from Southwest Missouri State with a B.S. in psychology.

== Coaching career ==
Elliott began her coaching career in 1992 as freshmen girls' basketball coach at Glendale High School in Springfield, Missouri. The following year, Elliott joined the coaching staff of Beth Burns at San Diego State. From 1994 to 1996, Elliott was an assistant coach at Southwest Missouri State, followed by a three-year stint at Southwest Baptist while pursuing an M.A. in education at the university.

In 1999, Elliott became women's head coach for the South Adelaide Basketball Club of the Australian Basketball Association and served one year in that position. From 2001 to 2003 Elliott had her first college head coaching position at California Baptist University. Elliott would build the basketball program from scratch and compile a 28-34 record with the Lancers. In her second season the Lancers would post a 16-16 record, snapping the programs 10-year losing streak.

After one season away from head coaching, Elliott returned as the head coach at Portland State. Once again she would be tasked with rebuilding the program. Over a three-year stretch Elliott compiled a 27-57 record. After the Vikings went 3-23, including 1-13 in the Big Sky Conference, during her first year in 2004-05, Portland State jumped to 12-16 and 6-8 in the conference during her second season and the Vikings qualified for the Big Sky Tournament. Portland State would finish 12-18 in her third season, including an 8-8 mark in the Big Sky.

Elliott would leave Portland State to become the head coach at UC San Diego. From 2007-2012 Elliott would become one of the top women's basketball coaches in Division 2. While with the Tritons, Elliott would compile a 127-34 overall record and would win the West Region's Coach of the Year. Elliott would lead the Tritons to four conference champions, five tournament berths, and two third-round appearances. To begin the 2011-12 season, the team would start 26-0 and be ranked as the #1 school in the nation for seven weeks. The team finished 30–3 and made the NCAA Tournament West Regional Championship. Elliott earned Women's Basketball Coaches Association West Region Coach of the Year and California Collegiate Athletic Association Coach of the Year honors that year.

On April 3, 2012, Elliott was hired as the head coach for Loyola Marymount (LMU). Elliott is married to Chris Elliott and has coached alongside him for more than 7 years at UC San Diego and LMU. Elliott stepped away from her position at LMU on April 5, 2021. She was hired as head coach at Point Loma on May 11, 2021.

== Personal life ==
Charity Elliott is married to Chris Elliott, a fellow Missouri State alum who has worked together with Elliott on coaching staffs dating back to their time at San Diego State in the 1993–94 season.

== Head coaching record ==
Statistics overview
Season	Team	Overall	Conference	Standing	Postseason
California Baptist Lancers (Golden State Athletic Conference) (2001–2003)
2001–02	California Baptist	12–19	6–14	9th	
2002–03	California Baptist	16–16	9–11	T–5th	
California Baptist:		28–35 (.444)	15–25 (.375)		
Portland State Vikings (Big Sky Conference) (2004–2007)
2004–05	Portland State	3–23	1–13	8th	
2005–06	Portland State	12–16	6–8	6th	
2006–07	Portland State	12–18	8–8	T–5th	
Portland State:		27–57 (.321)	15–29 (.341)		
UC San Diego Tritons (California Collegiate Athletic Association) (2007–2012)
2007–08	UC San Diego	25–10	14–6	3rd	NCAA D-II Second Round
2008–09	UC San Diego	27–5	19–1	1st	NCAA D-II Second Round
2009–10	UC San Diego	25–5	19–3	1st	NCAA D-II First Round
2010–11	UC San Diego	20–11	17–5	3rd	
2011–12	UC San Diego	30–3	21–1	1st	NCAA D-II Third Round
UC San Diego:		127–34 (.789)	90–16 (.849)		
Loyola Marymount Lions (West Coast Conference) (2012–2021)
2012–13	Loyola Marymount	13–18	6–10	T–5th	
2013–14	Loyola Marymount	9–21	6–12	T–7th	
2014–15	Loyola Marymount	7–24	4–14	8th	
2015–16	Loyola Marymount	11–20	6–12	T–7th	
2016–17	Loyola Marymount	14–16	9–9	T–5th	
2017–18	Loyola Marymount	19–11	11–7	T–3rd	
2018–19	Loyola Marymount	18–15	10–8	T-5th	WNIT First Round
Loyola Marymount:		91–125 (.421)	57–72 (.442)		
Total:		273–251 (.521)			
National champion Postseason invitational champion Conference regular season champion Conference regular season and conference tournament champion Division regular season champion Division regular season and conference tournament champion Conference tournament champion
