= Paul Thomas (basketball) =

American college basketball coach (born 1962)

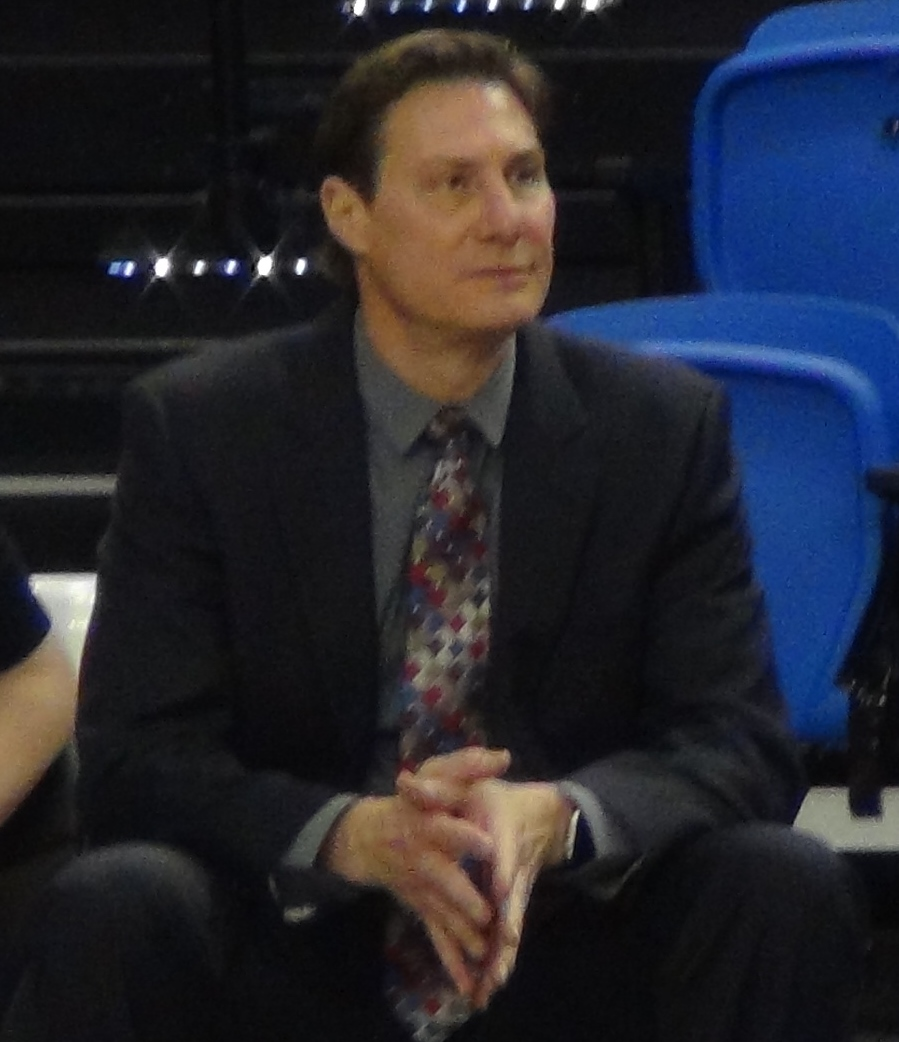
- Thomas in 2016 at San Jose State

Biographical details
- Born: October 28, 1962 (age 64); Creighton, Nebraska, U.S.
- Education: Wayne State College

Playing career
- 1981–1983: Midland Lutheran

Coaching career (HC unless noted)
- 1984–1985: Pender HS (asst.)
- 1985–1988: Wayne State (NE) (asst.)
- 1988–1990: Hamline
- 1990–1994: Cal Poly Pomona (asst.)
- 1994–2006: Cal Poly Pomona
- 2006–2023: Saint Mary's

Head coaching record
- Overall: 536–375 (.588)
- Tournaments: 15–6 (NCAA Division II); 8–10 (WNIT); 3–0 (WBI)

Accomplishments and honors

Championships
- WBI (2022); 2× NCAA Division II (2001, 2002); 5× CCAA regular season (1997, 1998, 2000–02); 2× CCAA Tournament (1997, 1998)

Awards
- WCC Coach of the Year (2015)

Paul Bernard Thomas (born October 28, 1962) is an American college basketball coach who was most recently the women's basketball head coach at Saint Mary's College of California. He previously served as head coach at Hamline and Cal Poly Pomona.

Originally from Creighton, Nebraska, Thomas graduated from Wayne State College in Nebraska and began his coaching career in 1985 as an assistant coach at Wayne State College and a local high school. Thomas had his first head coaching position from 1988 to 1990 at Hamline, a largely unsuccessful stint with only one win in two seasons. He moved to California to be an assistant coach at Cal Poly Pomona for four years before being promoted to head coach, a position he held from 1994 to 2006. Thomas was far more successful at Cal Poly Pomona, leading the Broncos to two NCAA Division II national titles in 2001 and 2002 and five California Collegiate Athletic Association titles.

From 2006 to 2022, Thomas was head coach at Saint Mary's, his first Division I coaching position. Thomas has over 250 wins at Saint Mary's in his first 14 seasons along with 10 consecutive appearances in the Women's National Invitation Tournament from 2010 to 2019.

== Early life ==
Thomas began playing basketball in Creighton, Nebraska. He would attend Creighton High School, where he played forward. While at Creighton, Thomas was made an all-state forward and named the 1981 Bulldogs Most Valuable Player.

After high school, Thomas would spend the next two years at Midland Lutheran College in Fremont, Nebraska, then retired from basketball and transferred to Wayne State College to complete his education and pursue a coaching career. He completed his bachelor's degree in 1986 and master's degree in physical education in 1988.

== Coaching career ==
=== Early coaching career (1984–1994) ===
As a student at Wayne State, Thomas began his coaching career in 1984 as an assistant coach for the Pender High School girls' team before serving as an assistant coach for the Wayne State women's basketball team from 1985 to 1988.

In 1988, Thomas entered his first head coaching position at Hamline University, an NCAA Division III school in Saint Paul, Minnesota. Hamline went 1–24 in his first season (1–19 MIAC) and 0–25 (0–20 MIAC) in 1989–90.

Thomas became an assistant coach again in 1990 at Cal Poly Pomona, where he would work for the next 16 years. From 1990 to 1994, Thomas was an assistant coach under head coach Darlene May. During that time, Cal Poly Pomona won three California Collegiate Athletic Association (CCAA) tournament titles from 1991 to 1993 and four regular season titles from 1991 to 1994.

=== Cal Poly Pomona (1994–2006) ===
After the passing of May, Thomas was promoted to head coach of Cal Poly Pomona in 1994. Over the next 12 years, Thomas would compile a 235–108 record. Thomas would lead the Broncos to five additional CCAA championships and back-to-back Division II national championships (2001 and 2002). He would reach the Division II NCAA Tournament eight out of the 12 seasons with a 14–6 postseason record. He recruited and coached two National Players of the Year, six First Team Kodak All-Americans, four CCAA Players of the Year and 15 First Team All-Conference players all while winning the NCAA Division II National Coach of the Year and NCAA District 8 Coach of the Year in 2002.

=== Saint Mary's (2006–2023) ===
After 12 seasons at Cal Poly Pomona, Thomas resigned in August 2006 to become the eighth women's head coach at Division I Saint Mary's, a member of the West Coast Conference (WCC). Only by his fourth season did Thomas achieve a winning record at Saint Mary's at 21–10. That season was the start of 10 consecutive winning seasons with Women's National Invitation Tournament appearances from 2010 to 2019. In 2010–11, the Gaels finished second in the WCC tournament behind Gonzaga. The 2012–13 Gaels won 23 games and advanced to the 2013 WNIT quarterfinals, the furthest in the WNIT under Thomas.

In 2015, after a third-place finish in the WCC, Thomas was selected as one of three WCC co-of the year, along with Pacific coach Lynne Roberts and Gonzaga coach Lisa Fortier. The 2014–15 Gaels again finished the season with 23 wins and made the WNIT quarterfinals for the second time in three seasons. Thomas followed that season with a new career best 24 wins at Saint Mary's in 2015–16.

However, following the 2019 Women's National Invitation Tournament, Saint Mary's had two consecutive losing seasons, finishing the 2019–20 season 12–19. In 2020–21, Saint Mary's was 7–19. As of his 15th season in 2020–21, Thomas has a 275–198 cumulative record at Saint Mary's.

Following a 7–4 start to the 2022–23 season, Saint Mary's suspended Thomas in late December 2022 pending the results of an internal investigation and announced on January 30, 2023 that Thomas would no longer be head coach; assistant coach Allyson Fasnacht became interim head coach immediately.

== Personal life ==
Thomas resides in Concord, California with his wife and their four children. When he coached at Cal Poly Pomona, he and his family lived in the Phillips Ranch community of Pomona. They previously lived in Orinda when Thomas first got the job at Saint Mary's.

== Head coaching record ==
Record table
Season	Team	Overall	Conference	Standing	Postseason
Hamline Pipers (Minnesota Intercollegiate Athletic Conference) (1988–1990)
1988–89	Hamline	1–24	1–19	11th	
1989–90	Hamline	0–26	0–20	11th	
Hamline:		1–50 (.020)	1–39 (.025)		
Cal Poly Pomona Broncos (California Collegiate Athletic Association) (1994–2006)
1994–95	Cal Poly Pomona	10–15	3–7	6th	
1995–96	Cal Poly Pomona	14–13	6–4	T–3rd	
1996–97	Cal Poly Pomona	22–8	8–2	1st	NCAA Division II second round
1997–98	Cal Poly Pomona	18–11	8–2	1st	NCAA Division II first round
1998–99	Cal Poly Pomona	23–6	16–4	3rd	NCAA Division II second round
1999–2000	Cal Poly Pomona	26–3	19–1	1st	NCAA Division II second round
2000–01	Cal Poly Pomona	27–3	20–2	1st	NCAA Division II Champions
2001–02	Cal Poly Pomona	28–4	19–3	1st	NCAA Division II Champions
2002–03	Cal Poly Pomona	13–14	11–11	6th	
2003–04	Cal Poly Pomona	23–7	17–5	2nd	NCAA Division II Third Round
2004–05	Cal Poly Pomona	20–8	15–5	T–2nd	NCAA Division II first round
2005–06	Cal Poly Pomona	11–16	8–12	7th	NCAA Division II first round
Cal Poly Pomona:		235–108 (.685)	150–58 (.721)		
Saint Mary's Gaels (West Coast Conference) (2006–2023)
2006–07	Saint Mary's	14–14	8–7	4th	
2007–08	Saint Mary's	15–17	6–8	5th	
2008–09	Saint Mary's	11–19	7–7	T–4th	
2009–10	Saint Mary's	21–10	12–2	2nd	WNIT first round
2010–11	Saint Mary's	19–13	10–4	2nd	WNIT first round
2011–12	Saint Mary's	22–11	11–5	4th	WNIT second round
2012–13	Saint Mary's	23–11	11–5	T–3rd	WNIT Quarterfinals
2013–14	Saint Mary's	23–10	11–7	T–4th	WNIT second round
2014–15	Saint Mary's	23–11	13–5	T–3rd	WNIT Quarterfinals
2015–16	Saint Mary's	24–8	14–4	2nd	WNIT first round
2016–17	Saint Mary's	20–13	13–5	3rd	WNIT first round
2017–18	Saint Mary's	20–11	13–5	2nd	WNIT first round
2018–19	Saint Mary's	21–12	12–6	T–3rd	WNIT second round
2019–20	Saint Mary's	12–19	6–12	7th	
2020–21	Saint Mary's	7–19	4–14	T–8th	
2021–22	Saint Mary's	18–15	9–9	5th	WBI champions
2022–23	Saint Mary's	7–4		(fired)	
Saint Mary's:		300–217 (.580)	147–100 (.595)		
Total:		536–375 (.588)			
National champion Postseason invitational champion Conference regular season champion Conference regular season and conference tournament champion Division regular season champion Division regular season and conference tournament champion Conference tournament champion
