= 2012–13 NCAA Division I women's basketball rankings =

US college baseball rankings

- Season: 2012–13
- NCAA Tournament: 2013
- Preseason No. 1: Baylor
- NCAA Tournament Champions: Connecticut
NCAA Division I women's basketball rankings


Two human polls comprise the 2012–13 NCAA Division I women's basketball rankings, the AP Poll and the Coaches Poll, in addition to various publications' preseason polls. The AP poll is currently a poll of sportswriters, while the USA Today Coaches' Poll is a poll of college coaches.

== Legend ==
–	Not ranked
(#)	Ranking

== AP Poll ==
Team	Pre- Season	Nov 12	Nov 19	Nov 26	Dec 3	Dec 10	Dec 17	Dec 24	Dec 31	Jan 7	Jan 14	Jan 21	Jan 28	Feb 4	Feb 11	Feb 18	Feb 25	Mar 4	Mar 11	Mar 18
Baylor	1	1	3	3	3	3	3	3	2	1	1	1	1	1	1	1	1	1	1	1
Notre Dame	7	7	5	5	5	5	5	5	5	2	2	2	2	2	2	2	2	2	2	2
Connecticut	2	2	2	2	2	2	2	2	1	3	3	3	3	3	3	3	3	3	3	3
Stanford	4	4	1	1	1	1	1	1	4	5	6	6	4	4	4	4	4	4	4	4
Duke	3	3	4	4	4	4	4	4	3	4	4	4	5	5	5	5	5	6	5	5
California	13	12	11	10	11	9	8	8	7	7	7	7	6	6	6	6	6	5	6	6
Kentucky	6	6	9	9	7	7	7	7	6	6	5	5	8	10	9	8	10	7	7	7
Penn State	8	9	6	6	10	11	11	10	9	8	8	8	7	8	8	7	7	8	8	8
Texas A&M	15	16	–	–	–	23	22	24	24	20	20	16	16	14	11	10	13	19	9	9
Tennessee	20	24	20	16	14	13	10	13	12	9	9	9	9	12	12	11	8	9	10	10
UCLA	–	–	19	19	17	14	12	17	16	14	14	19	18	17	15	17	17	14	11	11
Maryland	5	5	10	11	9	10	9	9	8	10	10	10	10	7	7	8	9	10	12	12
North Carolina	–	–	25	22	21	19	17	16	15	11	11	11	11	16	14	16	15	15	13	13
Georgia	10	10	8	8	6	6	6	6	10	13	13	14	13	9	13	13	11	12	14	14
Delaware	11	17	–	–	–	–	–	–	–	–	–	–	25	20	20	18	18	16	15	15
Louisville	9	8	7	7	8	8	14	12	11	15	15	13	12	11	10	12	16	13	16	16
South Carolina	–	–	–	–	–	24	21	19	18	18	19	18	15	15	16	15	14	17	17	17
Dayton	–	–	24	23	19	17	16	15	22	22	18	17	17	18	17	14	12	11	18	18
Colorado	–	–	–	–	–	–	25	23	20	23	21	20	22	21	21	20	19	18	19	19
Green Bay	–	–	–	–	–	–	–	–	–	–	–	–	–	–	–	25	21	20	20	20
Purdue	21	18	14	14	15	15	13	11	14	12	12	15	14	13	18	22	25	–	21	21
Syracuse	–	–	–	–	–	–	–	–	–	–	–	–	–	24	23	21	22	24	22	22
Iowa State	–	–	–	24	22	–	–	–	–	25	24	24	23	25	24	–	23	–	23	23
Nebraska	18	15	23	21	25	–	–	–	25	–	–	–	–	–	–	24	20	21	24	24
Florida State	–	–	–	–	24	–	23	21	19	18	22	22	20	19	19	19	24	23	25	25
LSU	–	–	–	–	–	–	–	–	–	–	–	–	–	–	–	–	–	22	–	–
Oklahoma State	23	22	21	18	16	16	15	14	13	21	17	12	19	22	25	23	–	–	–	–
Toledo	–	–	–	–	–	–	–	–	–	–	–	–	–	–	–	–	–	25	–	–
West Virginia	17	14	12	25	–	25	24	–	–	–	–	–	–	–	–	–	–	–	–	–
Michigan State	–	–	–	–	–	–	–	–	–	–	–	25	–	–	–	–	–	–	–	–
Oklahoma	12	11	13	12	13	12	18	18	17	16	16	20	21	23	22	–	–	–	–	–
St. John's	14	20	18	17	–	–	–	–	–	–	–	–	–	–	–	–	–	–	–	–
Vanderbilt	16	13	17	–	–	–	–	–	–	–	–	–	–	–	–	–	–	–	–	–
Ohio State	19	20	16	15	20	20	–	–	–	–	–	–	–	–	–	–	–	–	–	–
Georgia Tech	22	–	–	–	–	–	–	–	–	–	–	–	–	–	–	–	–	–	–	–
Miami (FL)	24	23	–	–	23	21	–	–	–	24	–	–	–	–	–	–	–	–	–	–
DePaul	25	–	–	–	–	–	–	–	–	–	–	–	–	–	–	–	–	–	–	–
Texas	–	19	15	13	12	18	20	20	–	–	–	–	–	–	–	–	–	–	–	–
Arkansas	–	–	–	–	–	–	–	25	23	–	–	–	–	–	–	–	–	–	–	–
Kansas	–	–	22	20	17	22	19	22	21	17	23	–	–	–	–	–	–	–	–	–
Michigan	–	–	–	–	–	–	–	–	–	–	25	23	–	–	–	–	–	–	–	–
Delaware	–	–	–	–	–	–	–	–	–	–	–	–	25	–	–	–	–	–	–	–
Georgetown	–	25	–	–	–	–	–	–	–	–	–	–	–	–	–	–	–	–	–	–

== USA Today Coaches poll ==
Team	Pre- Season	Nov 13	Nov 20	Nov 27	Dec 4	Dec 11	Dec 18	Dec 25	Jan 1	Jan 8	Jan 15	Jan 22	Jan 29	Feb 5	Feb 12	Feb 19	Feb 26	Mar 5	Mar 12	Mar 19	Apr 10
Connecticut	2	2	2	2	2	2	2	2	1	2	2	2	2	2	2	2	3	3	3	3	1
Notre Dame	6	6	5	5	5	5	5	5	5	3	3	3	3	3	3	3	2	2	2	2	2
Louisville	9	8	6	6	8	8	13	12	10	13	13	12	12	11	11	11	14	15	17	17	3
Baylor	1	1	3	3	3	3	3	3	2	1	1	1	1	1	1	1	1	1	1	1	4
California	15	12	11	11	11	11	9	8	7	7	7	7	6	6	6	6	6	5	6	6	5
Duke	3	3	4	4	4	4	4	4	4	5	4	5	4	4	4	4	4	6	5	5	6
Stanford	4	4	1	1	1	1	1	1	3	4	6	6	5	5	5	5	5	4	4	4	7
Kentucky	7	7	8	8	6	6	6	6	6	6	5	4	7	8	7	7	10	7	7	7	8
Tennessee	16	20	15	14	13	12	11	15	13	9	9	9	10	13	10	10	8	9	9	9	9
Georgia	11	10	9	9	7	7	7	7	11	12	12	14	14	10	12	12	11	12	13	13	10
Maryland	5	5	10	10	9	9	8	9	8	10	10	10	9	7	8	8	9	10	10	10	11
Penn State	8	9	7	7	10	10	10	10	9	8	8	8	8	9	9	9	7	8	8	8	12
Delaware	10	17	–	–	–	–	–	–	–	–	–	–	–	23	22	19	18	16	16	16	13
Texas A&M	12	13	24	25	–	25	22	22	22	21	20	18	16	16	13	13	15	19	12	11	14
UCLA	–	–	22	21	19	17	16	18	17	15	15	20	19	17	16	16	16	13	11	12	15
South Carolina	–	–	–	24	21	18	17	16	15	16	18	14	13	12	14	15	13	14	15	14	16
Dayton	–	–	25	22	18	16	15	14	18	17	17	16	15	15	15	14	12	11	14	15	16
Nebraska	19	15	20	19	22	24	21	19	19	23	–	–	–	–	–	–	25	24	25	25	18
North Carolina	–	–	–	–	–	–	25	23	23	20	19	16	18	18	17	17	17	17	18	18	19
Purdue	18	14	12	13	14	14	12	11	14	11	11	13	11	14	18	21	22	25	21	21	20
LSU	–	–	–	–	–	–	–	–	–	–	–	–	–	–	–	–	–	–	–	–	21
Iowa State	–	–	–	–	–	–	–	–	–	24	22	24	22	24	23	24	21	22	23	23	22
Oklahoma	14	11	13	12	12	13	18	17	16	14	14	19	20	19	19	25	–	–	–	–	23
Green Bay	25	–	–	–	–	–	–	–	–	–	–	–	–	–	–	–	23	20	20	20	24
Kansas	25	25	23	20	17	21	19	20	20	19	21	–	–	–	–	–	–	–	–	–	25
Florida State	–	–	–	–	24	–	–	25	21	22	24	21	21	20	20	20	24	23	24	24	–
Oklahoma State	24	22	18	17	15	15	14	13	12	18	16	11	16	21	24	22	–	–	–	–	–
Colorado	–	–	–	–	–	–	–	–	25	–	25	23	23	25	25	23	19	18	19	19	–
Syracuse	–	–	–	–	–	–	–	–	–	–	23	22	24	22	21	18	20	21	22	22	–
West Virginia	22	19	14	23	23	22	20	–	–	–	–	–	–	–	–	–	–	–	–	–	–
South Carolina	13	18	16	15	25	–	–	–	–	–	–	–	–	–	–	–	–	–	–	–	–
Ohio State	21	21	17	16	20	19	24	24	24	–	–	–	–	–	–	–	–	–	–	–	–
Vanderbilt	17	16	19	–	–	–	–	–	–	–	–	–	–	–	–	–	–	–	–	–	–
Georgia Tech	20	–	–	–	–	–	–	–	–	–	–	–	–	–	–	–	–	–	–	–	–
Maryland	23	23	–	–	–	23	–	–	–	25	–	–	–	–	–	–	–	–	–	–	–
Texas	–	24	21	17	16	20	23	21	–	–	–	–	–	–	–	–	–	–	–	–	–
Green Bay	–	–	–	–	–	–	–	–	–	–	–	–	25	–	–	–	–	–	–	–	–
Vanderbilt	–	–	–	–	–	–	–	–	–	–	–	25	–	–	–	–	–	–	–	–	–
