= 2025–26 Seton Hall Pirates women's basketball team =

Intercollegiate basketball season

2025–26 Seton Hall Pirates women's basketball

WBIT, First Round
- Conference: Big East Conference
- Record: 19–13 (12–8 Big East)
- Head coach: Anthony Bozzella (13th season)
- Assistant coaches: Jose Rebimbas; Cassandra Callaway; Ka-Deidre Simmons
- Home arena: Walsh Gymnasium

2025–26 Big East women's basketball standings
	Conf.				Overall
Team	W		L	PCT	W		L	PCT
No. 3 UConn †	20	–	0	1.000	38	–	1	.974
Villanova	16	–	4	.800	25	–	8	.758
Seton Hall	12	–	8	.600	19	–	13	.594
Marquette	12	–	8	.600	18	–	12	.600
Creighton	11	–	9	.550	16	–	15	.516
St. John's	11	–	9	.550	22	–	12	.647
Providence	7	–	13	.350	15	–	18	.455
Butler	6	–	14	.300	12	–	19	.387
Georgetown	6	–	14	.300	14	–	17	.452
DePaul	5	–	15	.250	8	–	24	.250
Xavier	4	–	16	.200	11	–	19	.367
† 2026 Big East tournament winner Rankings from AP poll

The 2025–26 Seton Hall Pirates women's basketball team represents Seton Hall University during the 2025–26 NCAA Division I women's basketball season. The Pirates, led by thirteenth-year head coach Anthony Bozzella, play their home games in South Orange, New Jersey, at the Walsh Gymnasium as members of the Big East Conference.

== Previous season ==
The Pirates finished the season 23–10, 13–5 in Big East play to finish in third place. They defeated Xavier in the first round of the Big East women's tournament before losing to Creighton in the semifinals. They received an at-large bid to the WBIT, where they won in the first round against Quinnipiac but lost in the second round to Portland.

=== Departures ===
Seton Hall departures
Name	Num	Pos.	Height	Year	Hometown	Reason for departure
Joniyah Bland-Fitzpatrick	1	F	5'10"	Sophomore	New London, CT	Transferred to Bowling Green
Faith Masonius	3	F	6'1"	Graduate student	Spring Lake, NJ	Graduated
Yaya Lops	7	F	6'3"	Graduate student	Stamford, CT	Graduated
Nicole Melious	10	F	5'8"	Sophomore	Staten Island, NY	Transferred to Siena
Kaydan Lawson	15	G/F	6'0"	Graduate student	Cleveland, OH	Graduated
Amari Wright	22	G	5'9"	Graduate student	Jacksonville, FL	Graduated
Ramani Parker	24	F	6'4"	Graduate student	Fresno, CA	Graduated

=== Incoming transfers ===
Seton Hall incoming transfers
Name	Num	Pos.	Height	Year	Hometown	Previous school
Mariana Valenzuela	6	F	6'2"	Senior	Mazatlán, Mexico	Florida State
Cam Rust	10	F	6'1"	Sophomore	Wakefield, RI	Penn State
Jordana Codio	23	G	6'1"	Senior	Winter Garden, FL	Texas

=== Recruiting class ===
There was no recruiting class for 2025.

== Roster ==
2025–26 Seton Hall Pirates women's basketball team
Players
Coaches

Pos.	#	Name	Height	Year	Previous school	Hometown
G	0	Jada Eads (injured)	5 ft 7 in (1.7 m)	So	Lake Highland Prep	Orlando, Florida
G	1	Ari Woodward	5 ft 8 in (1.73 m)	Fr	Lake Highland Prep	Oviedo, Florida
G	2	Ja'Kahla Craft	5 ft 9 in (1.75 m)	So	St. Michael-Albertville	Elk River, Minnesota
G/F	3	Natalia Hall-Rosa	6 ft 0 in (1.83 m)	Fr	Rivers School	Randolph, Massachusetts
F/C	4	Savanna Jones	6 ft 2 in (1.88 m)	Jr	North Dakota State College of Science	Eden Prairie, Minnesota
G	5	Savannah Catalon	5 ft 8 in (1.73 m)	Jr	Mansfield Legacy	Burleson, Texas
F	6	Mariana Valenzuela	6 ft 2 in (1.88 m)	Sr	Florida State	Mazatlán, Mexico
G	8	Zahara Bishop	6 ft 0 in (1.83 m)	Fr	Benilde-St. Margaret's	Minneapolis, Minnesota
F	10	Cam Rust	6 ft 1 in (1.85 m)	So	Penn State	Wakefield, Rhode Island
F	13	Messiah Hunter	6 ft 2 in (1.88 m)	Sr	West Virginia	Hopewell, Virginia
G/F	21	Shailyn Pinkey	5 ft 10 in (1.78 m)	Sr	East Hartford	East Hartford, Connecticut
G	23	Jordana Codio	6 ft 1 in (1.85 m)	Sr	Texas	Winter Garden, Florida
F	24	Trishay Collins	6 ft 1 in (1.85 m)	Fr	Palm Bay	Palm Bay, Florida
G/F	35	Jada Snow	5 ft 10 in (1.78 m)	Fr	Sanford School	Bear, Delaware

Head coach

- Anthony Bozzella (Seton Hall)

Assistant coach(es)

- Jose Rebimbas (Seton Hall)
- Cassandra Callaway (Albany)
- Ka-Deidre Simmons (Seton Hall)

Legend

- (C) Team captain
- (S) Suspended
- (I) Ineligible
- (W) Walk-on
- Injured
- Current redshirt

Roster

== Schedule and results ==
Date time, TV	Rank^{#}	Opponent^{#}	Result	Record	High points	High rebounds	High assists	Site (attendance) city, state
Exhibition
October 30, 2025*; 7:00 p.m.		Jefferson	W 92–42		25 – Codio	6 – Tied	6 – Pinkney	Walsh Gymnasium (418); South Orange, NJ
Regular season
November 4, 2025*; 7:00 p.m., ESPN+		Saint Peter's	W 88–39	1–0	20 – Codio	8 – Valenzuela	5 – Eads	Walsh Gymnasium (757); South Orange, NJ
November 14, 2025*; 9:00 p.m., ESPN+		at San Francisco	W 80–66	2–0	Eads – 16	15 – Eads	9 – Valenzuela	Sobrato Center (367); San Francisco, CA
November 16, 2025*; 5:00 p.m., ESPN+		at Pacific	W 79–57	3–0	16 – Valenzuela	8 – Valenzuela	5 – Eads	Alex G. Spanos Center (516); Stockton, CA
November 20, 2025; 7:00 p.m., ESPN+		Fordham	W 90–83 ^{2OT}	4–0	21 – Valenzuela	8 – Tied	3 – Tied	Walsh Gymnasium (689); South Orange, NJ
December 2, 2025*; 9:00 p.m., ESPN+		at Princeton	L 78–82	4–1	24 – Catalon	10 – Eads	5 – Eads	Jadwin Gymnasium (665); Princeton, NJ
December 4, 2025; 7:00 p.m., ESPN+		Butler	W 70–51	5–1 (1–0)	25 – Valenzuela	13 – Valenzuela	6 – Eads	Walsh Gymnasium (629); South Orange, NJ
December 7, 2025*; 2:00 p.m., ACCN		at NC State	L 53–61	5–2	16 – Eads	7 – Tied	4 – Eads	Reynolds Coliseum (4,789); Raleigh, NC
December 9, 2025*; 6:00 p.m., ESPN+		Columbia	L 53–54	5–3	16 – Catalon	10 – Tied	2 – Tied	Walsh Gymnasium (1,195); South Orange, NJ
December 14, 2025*; 1:00 p.m., ESPN+		Auburn	W 69–63	6–3	20 – Valenzuela	8 – Tied	Tied –	Walsh Gymnasium (838); South Orange, NJ
December 16, 2025*; 7:00 p.m., ESPN+		Washington State	W 74–65	7–3	19 – Bishop	10 – Bishop	4 – Eads	Walsh Gymnasium (556); South Orange, NJ
December 19, 2025; 7:00 p.m., ESPN+		at Villanova	L 55–72	7–4 (1–1)	12 – Eads	6 – Catalon	2 – Eads	Finneran Pavilion (1,113); Villanova, PA
December 22, 2025; 4:00 p.m., ESPN+		at Creighton	W 88–79	8–4 (2–1)	23 – Valenzuela	7 – Catalon	6 – Catalon	D. J. Sokol Arena (1,052); Omaha, NE
December 28, 2025; 1:00 p.m., ESPN+		Xavier	W 75–55	9–4 (3–1)	24 – Catalon	10 – Valenzuela	7 – Eads	Walsh Gymnasium (959); South Orange, NJ
December 31, 2025; 1:00 p.m., ESPN+		Georgetown	W 81–36	10–4 (4–1)	14 – Catalon	8 – Valenzuela	4 – Tied	Walsh Gymnasium (744); South Orange, NJ
January 3, 2026; 12:00 p.m., FS1		at No. 1 UConn	L 48–84	10–5 (4–2)	12 – Codio	7 – Catalon	3 – Tied	PeoplesBank Arena (15,465); Hartford, CT
January 8, 2026; 7:00 p.m., ESPN+		at Providence	W 58–48	11–5 (5–2)	17 – Codio	9 – Valenzuela	4 – Bishop	Alumni Hall (667); Providence, RI
January 14, 2026; 7:00 p.m., ESPN+		Marquette	W 64–61	12–5 (6–2)	26 – Valenzuela	7 – Tied	6 – Eads	Walsh Gymnasium (729); South Orange, NJ
January 17, 2026; 3:00 p.m., ESPN+		at DePaul	W 86–77	13–5 (7–2)	24 – Catalon	7 – Valenzuela	5 – Tied	Wintrust Arena (1,790); Chicago, IL
January 20, 2026; 7:00 p.m., ESPN+		Providence	W 73–57	14–5 (8–2)	19 – Catalon	8 – Valenzuela	9 – Pinkney	Walsh Gymnasium (879); South Orange, NJ
January 24, 2026 (Note: Originally scheduled for January 25, but was moved due to inclement weather.); 12:00 p.m., Peacock		No. 1 UConn	L 52–92	14–6 (8–3)	18 – Valenzuela	8 – Valenzuela	4 – Bishop	Walsh Gymnasium (1,202); South Orange, NJ
January 29, 2026; 11:00 a.m., ESPN+		at Georgetown	W 58–52	15–6 (9–3)	19 – Valenzuela	5 – Catalon	5 – Pinkney	McDonough Arena (237); Washington, D.C.
February 1, 2026; 3:00 p.m., TruTV		Creighton	L 66–72	15–7 (9–4)	20 – Codio	7 – Valenzuela	3 – Bishop	Walsh Gymnasium (1,213); South Orange, NJ
February 7, 2026; 2:00 p.m., ESPN+		at St. John's	L 61–67	15–8 (9–5)	17 – Valenzuela	8 – Craft	3 – Catalon	Carnesecca Arena (841); Queens, NY
February 11, 2026; 7:30 p.m., ESPN+		at Marquette	W 70–58	16–8 (10–5)	20 – Bishop	11 – Craft	4 – Woodard	Al McGuire Center (1,394); Milwaukee, WI
February 14, 2026; 1:00 p.m., ESPN+		DePaul	W 96–74	17–8 (11–5)	26 – Craft	13 – Valenzuela	11 – Woodard	Walsh Gymnasium (949); South Orange, NJ
February 18, 2026; 6:30 p.m., ESPN+		at Xavier	W 64–55	18–8 (12–5)	22 – Codio	10 – Valenzuela	5 – Catalon	Cintas Center (1,249); Cincinnati, OH
February 22, 2026; 1:00 p.m., ESPN+		St. John's	L 56–59	18–9 (12–6)	14 – Codio	11 – Valenzuela	3 – Woodard	Walsh Gymnasium (921); South Orange, NJ
February 26, 2026; 7:00 p.m., Peacock		Villanova	L 52–82	18–10 (12–7)	19 – Bishop	6 – Codio	3 – Hall-Rosa	Walsh Gymnasium (1,262); South Orange, NJ
March 1, 2026; 3:30 p.m., Peacock		at Butler	L 55–62	18–11 (12–8)	27 – Codio	9 – Codio	3 – Pinkney	Hinkle Fieldhouse (1,678); Indianapolis, IN
Big East tournament
March 7, 2026; 9:30 p.m., Peacock	(3)	vs. (2) St. Johns; Quarterfinals	W 63–61	19–11	35 – Codio	5 – Catalon	5 – Pinkney	Mohegan Sun Arena; Uncasville, CT
March 8, 2026; 5:00 p.m., Peacock	(3)	vs. (2) Villanova; Semifinals	L 48–62	19–12	13 – Bishop	7 – Bishop	2 – Bishop	Mohegan Sun Arena; Uncasville, CT
WBIT
March 19, 2026*; 7:00 p.m., ESPN+		(4) Missouri; First round	L 57–67	19–13	17 – Valenzuela	10 – Valenzuela	6 – Woodard	Walsh Gymnasium (453); South Orange, NJ
*Non-conference game. ^{#}Rankings from AP Poll. (#) Tournament seedings in parentheses. All times are in Eastern Time.

== See also ==
- 2025–26 Seton Hall Pirates men's basketball team
