= 2025–26 St. John's Red Storm women's basketball team =

American college basketball season

2025–26 St. John's Red Storm women's basketball

WBIT, First Round
- Conference: Big East Conference
- Record: 22–12 (11–9 Big East)
- Head coach: Joe Tartamella (14th season)
- Associate head coach: Steve Pogue (2nd season)
- Assistant coaches: Kaity Healy; Venessa Abel; Joe Rutigliano
- Home arena: Carnesecca Arena

2025–26 Big East women's basketball standings
	Conf.				Overall
Team	W		L	PCT	W		L	PCT
No. 3 UConn †	20	–	0	1.000	38	–	1	.974
Villanova	16	–	4	.800	25	–	8	.758
Seton Hall	12	–	8	.600	19	–	13	.594
Marquette	12	–	8	.600	18	–	12	.600
Creighton	11	–	9	.550	16	–	15	.516
St. John's	11	–	9	.550	22	–	12	.647
Providence	7	–	13	.350	15	–	18	.455
Butler	6	–	14	.300	12	–	19	.387
Georgetown	6	–	14	.300	14	–	17	.452
DePaul	5	–	15	.250	8	–	24	.250
Xavier	4	–	16	.200	11	–	19	.367
† 2026 Big East tournament winner Rankings from AP poll

The 2025–26 St. John's Red Storm women's basketball team represent St. John's University during the 2025–26 NCAA Division I women's basketball season. The Red Storm, led by head coach Joe Tartamella, play their games at Carnesecca Arena and are members of the Big East Conference.

== Offseason ==
=== Departures ===
St. John's Departures
Name	Num	Pos.	Height	Year	Hometown	Reason for Departure
Ariana Vanderhoop	1	G	5'9"	Graduate Student	Boston, Massachusetts	Graduated
Jayda Brown	10	G	6'0"	Sophomore	Atlanta, Georgia	Transferred to Tulane
Lashae Dwyer	13	G	5'6"	Senior	Toronto, Ontario	Graduated
Jade Blagrove	20	G	6'2"	Graduate Student	Barendrecht, Netherlands	Graduated
Phoenix Gedeon	21	G	6'0"	Senior	Montreal, QC	Graduated
Nevaeh Wingate	22	F	6'0"	Sophomore	Liverpool, New York	Transferred to Northern Illinois
Ber'Nyah Mayo	23	G	5'6"	Graduate Student	Wilmington, Delaware	Graduated
Tara Daye	44	G	5'10"	Junior	Newark, New Jersey	Transferred to Purdue

=== Incoming transfers ===
St. John's incoming transfers
Name	Num	Pos.	Height	Year	Hometown	From
Daniella Abies	16	F	6'0"	Redshirt Junior	Málaga, Spain	Wichita State; Miami
Sa'Mya Wyatt	20	F	5'11"	Sophomore	Powder Springs, Georgia	Austin Peay

==== Recruiting class of 2025 ====
College recruiting
Name	Hometown	School	Height	Weight	Commit date
Kyla Hayes; Forward	Buffalo, New York	Cardinal O' Hara High School	6 ft 0 in (1.83 m)	N/A	
Kyla Hayes; Forward	Recruit ratings: No ratings found				
Overall recruit ranking:
Note: In many cases, Scout, Rivals, 247Sports, On3, and ESPN may conflict in their listings of height and weight.; In these cases, the average was taken. ESPN grades are on a 100-point scale.; Sources: "2025 Player Commits". ESPN. Archived from the original on November 18, 2025.

== Roster ==
2023–24 St. John's Red Storm women's basketball team
Players
Coaches

Pos.	#	Name	Height	Year	Previous school	Hometown
G	1	Beautiful Waheed	5 ft 10 in (1.78 m)	Jr	Wabash Valley	Milwaukee, WI
F	2	Julie Bahati	6 ft 2 in (1.88 m)	Jr	Springfield Central	Nairobi, Kenya
G	3	Ariel Little	5 ft 4 in (1.63 m)	So	South Shore	Brooklyn, New York
G	4	Skye Owen	5 ft 7 in (1.7 m)	RS So	St. Francis Prep	Staten Island, NY
G	5	Jailah Donald	5 ft 7 in (1.7 m)	Sr	Serra	Inglewood, CA
G	8	Shaulana Wagner	5 ft 10 in (1.78 m)	GS	Xavier	Detroit, MI
G	10	Brooke Moore	6 ft 0 in (1.83 m)	Jr	Liberty	Kennesaw, Georgia
G	11	Janeya Grant	6 ft 0 in (1.83 m)	So	South Shore	Middletown, CT
G	12	Kyla Hayes	6 ft 0 in (1.83 m)	Fr	Cardinal O'Hara	Buffalo, NY
F	14	Kylie Lavelle	6 ft 2 in (1.88 m)	Sr	Riverside; Penn State; Drexel	Moosic, Pennsylvania
F	16	Daniela Ables	6 ft 0 in (1.83 m)	RS Jr	Wichita State	Málaga, Spain
F	20	Sa'Mya Wyatt	5 ft 11 in (1.8 m)	Jr	Austin Peay	Powder Springs, GA

Head coach

- Joe Tartamella (James Madison)

Assistant coach(es)

- Steve Pogue (Nyack)
- Kaity Healy (Seton Hall)
- Venessa Abel (Duquesne)
- Joe Rutigliano (Canisius)

Legend

- (C) Team captain
- (S) Suspended
- (I) Ineligible
- (W) Walk-on
- Injured
- Current redshirt

Roster
Last update: November 18, 2025

== Schedule and results ==
Date time, TV	Rank^{#}	Opponent^{#}	Result	Record	High points	High rebounds	High assists	Site (attendance) city, state
Non-conference regular season
November 3, 2025*; 2:00 p.m., ESPN+		Le Moyne	W 68–53	1–0	15 – Moore	15 – Abies	1 – Wagner	Carnesecca Arena (427); Queens, NY
November 7, 2025*; 8:00 p.m., ESPN+		at Harvard	L 56–61	1–1	19 – Wagner	8 – Tied	3 – Wagner	Lavietes Pavilion (658); Cambridge, MA
November 11, 2025*; 5:00 p.m., ESPN+		at Quinnipiac	W 53–51	2–1	10 – Waheed	8 – Wyatt	3 – Wagner	M&T Bank Arena (537); Hamden, CT
November 14, 2025*; 1:30 p.m., ESPN+		Yale	W 88–60	3–1	16 – Moore	7 – Abies	8 – Wagner	Carnesecca Arena (518); Queens, NY
November 19, 2025*; 7:00 p.m., ESPN+		No. 18 Oklahoma State	W 74–67	4–1	13 – Moore	8 – Wyatt	6 – Lavelle	Carnesecca Arena (726); Queens, NY
November 24, 2025*; 6:00 p.m., ESPN+		Central Connecticut State	W 71–46	5–1	20 – Moore	11 – Moore	8 – Wagner	Carnesecca Arena (543); Queens, NY
November 28, 2025*; 5:00 p.m., FloSports		vs. Georgia Tech; Cayman Islands Classic	W 77–75	6–1	25 – Moore	7 – Tied	13 – Wagner	John Gray Gymnasium (450); George Town, Cayman Islands
November 29, 2025*; 7:30 p.m., FloSports		vs. Memphis; Cayman Islands Classic	W 84–73	7–1	22 – Wyatt	11 – Moore	5 – Tied	John Gray Gymnasium (313); George Town, Cayman Islands
December 4, 2025; 7:00 p.m., ESPN+		Creighton	L 52–60	7–2 (0–1)	16 – Wyatt	11 – Moore	4 – Wagner	Carnesecca Arena (535); Queens, NY
December 7, 2025; 2:00 p.m., ESPN+		Providence	W 62–55	8–2 (1–1)	16 – Moore	8 – Wagner	5 – Tied	Carnesecca Arena (838); Queens, NY
December 10, 2025*; 7:00 p.m., FloSports		at Stony Brook	W 73–42	9–2	13 – Wyatt	8 – Wyatt	3 – Tied	Stony Brook Arena (500); Stony Brook, NY
December 13, 2025*; 2:00 p.m., ESPN+		Hofstra	W 63–60	10–2	17 – Lavelle	6 – Wyatt	5 – Wagner	Carnesecca Arena (881); Queens, NY
December 17, 2025*; 7:00 p.m., NEC FrontRow		at New Haven	W 67–47	11–2	23 – Moore	9 – Moore	5 – Wagner	Jeffrey P. Hazell Athletics Center (694); West Haven, CT
December 22, 2025; 12:00 p.m., ESPN+		at Villanova	L 48–85	11–3 (1–2)	11 – Tied	5 – Tied	3 – Tied	Finneran Pavilion (909); Villanova, PA
December 29, 2025; 7:30 p.m., ESPN+		at Marquette	W 73–66	12–3 (2–2)	14 – Waheed	8 – Tied	9 – Wagner	Al McGuire Center (1,602); Milwaukee, WI
January 1, 2026; 2:00 p.m., ESPN+		DePaul	W 75–58	13–3 (3–2)	11 – Tied	5 – Tied	3 – Tied	Carnesecca Arena (680); Queens, NY
January 7, 2026; 7:30 p.m., truTV		at No. 1 UConn	L 43–88	13–4 (3–3)	14 – Waheed	6 – Abies	3 – Donald	PeoplesBank Arena (13,229); Hartford, CT
January 10, 2026; 2:00 p.m., ESPN+		Butler	W 49–39	14–4 (4–3)	16 – Waheed	10 – Moore	4 – Wyatt	Carnesecca Arena (903); Queens, NY
January 13, 2026; 7:00 p.m., ESPN+		at Georgetown	L 34–59	14–5 (4–4)	11 – Moore	13 – Wyatt	2 – Tied	McDonough Arena (321); Washington, D.C.
January 17, 2026; 1:00 p.m., ESPN+		at Xavier	W 66–64	15–5 (5–4)	28 – Wyatt	9 – Abies	8 – Wagner	Cintas Center (1,085); Cincinnati, OH
January 21, 2026; 8:00 p.m., Peacock		Marquette	L 55–56	15–6 (5–5)	16 – Moore	7 – Tied	5 – Wagner	Carnesecca Arena (528); Queens, NY
January 24, 2026; 2:00 p.m., FS1		Villanova	W 71–58	16–6 (6–5)	20 – Moore	9 – Waheed	4 – Tied	Carnesecca Arena (1,039); Queens, NY
January 28, 2026; 7:00 p.m., ESPN+		at Creighton	L 51–81	16–7 (6–6)	14 – Wyatt	8 – Wyatt	3 – Wagner	D. J. Sokol Arena (735); Omaha, NE
January 31, 2026; 1:00 p.m., ESPN+		at Providence	W 62–57	17–7 (7–6)	16 – Abies	11 – Abies	5 – Donald	Alumni Hall (804); Providence, RI
February 4, 2026; 7:00 p.m., ESPN+		Xavier	W 71–52	18–7 (8–6)	14 – Tied	8 – Abies	5 – Donald	Carnesecca Arena (535); Queens, NY
February 7, 2026; 2:00 p.m., ESPN+		Seton Hall	W 67–61	19–7 (9–6)	20 – Wyatt	12 – Abies	5 – Donald	Carnesecca Arena (841); Queens, NY
February 10, 2026; 7:00 p.m., ESPN+		at DePaul	L 68–72	19–8 (9–7)	20 – Waheed	8 – Abies	5 – Donald	Wintrust Arena (1,007); Chicago, IL
February 14, 2026; 2:00 p.m., ESPN+		at Butler	W 58–47	20–8 (10–7)	12 – Waheed	12 – Abies	2 – Tied	Hinkle Fieldhouse (1,876); Indianapolis, IN
February 18, 2026; 2:00 p.m., ESPN+		Georgetown	L 60–62	20–9 (10–8)	15 – Moore	9 – Abies	5 – Wagner	Carnesecca Arena (1,044); Queens, NY
February 22, 2026; 1:00 p.m., ESPN+		at Seton Hall	W 59–56	21–9 (11–8)	12 – Tied	19 – Abies	5 – Wagner	Walsh Gymnasium (921); South Orange, NJ
March 1, 2026; 7:30 p.m., TNT/truTV		No. 1 UConn	L 49–85	21–10 (11–9)	8 – Donald	6 – Abies	4 – Little	Madison Square Garden (9,612); New York, NY
Big East Women's Tournament
March 6, 2026; 4:00 PM, Peacock	(6)	vs. (11) Xavier; First round	W 53–48	22–10	16 – Tied	12 – Wyatt	3 – Wagner	Mohegan Sun Arena; Uncasville, CT
March 7, 2026; 9:30 PM, Peacock	(6)	vs. (3) Seton Hall; Quarterfinal	L 61–63	22–11	15 – Donald	6 – Abies	7 – Wagner	Mohegan Sun Arena; Uncasville, CT
WBIT
March 19, 2026; 7:00 PM, ESPN+		at (4) Columbia; First round	L 26–74	22–12	10 – Abies	8 – Abies	3 – Tied	Levien Gymnasium (714); New York, NY
*Non-conference game. ^{#}Rankings from AP Poll. (#) Tournament seedings in parentheses. All times are in Eastern Time.

== Rankings ==
Ranking movements
	Week																				
Poll	Pre	1	2	3	4	5	6	7	8	9	10	11	12	13	14	15	16	17	18	19	Final
AP																					Not released
Coaches																					

== See also ==
- 2025–26 St. John's Red Storm men's basketball team
