= 2025–26 Xavier Musketeers women's basketball team =

American college basketball season

2025–26 Xavier Musketeers women's basketball
- Conference: Big East Conference
- Record: 11–19 (4–16 Big East)
- Head coach: Billi Chambers (3rd season)
- Associate head coach: Ashlee Kelly
- Assistant coaches: Brianna Sanders; Myia Johnson
- Home arena: Cintas Center

2025–26 Big East women's basketball standings
| | Conf. | | | | Overall |
| Team | W | | L | PCT | W | | L | PCT |
|---|---|---|---|---|---|---|---|---|
| No. 3 UConn † | 20 | – | 0 | 1.000 | 38 | – | 1 | .974 |
| Villanova | 16 | – | 4 | .800 | 25 | – | 8 | .758 |
| Seton Hall | 12 | – | 8 | .600 | 19 | – | 13 | .594 |
| Marquette | 12 | – | 8 | .600 | 18 | – | 12 | .600 |
| Creighton | 11 | – | 9 | .550 | 16 | – | 15 | .516 |
| St. John's | 11 | – | 9 | .550 | 22 | – | 12 | .647 |
| Providence | 7 | – | 13 | .350 | 15 | – | 18 | .455 |
| Butler | 6 | – | 14 | .300 | 12 | – | 19 | .387 |
| Georgetown | 6 | – | 14 | .300 | 14 | – | 17 | .452 |
| DePaul | 5 | – | 15 | .250 | 8 | – | 24 | .250 |
| Xavier | 4 | – | 16 | .200 | 11 | – | 19 | .367 |
† 2026 Big East tournament winner Rankings from AP poll

The 2025–26 Xavier Musketeers women's basketball team represented Xavier University during the 2025–26 NCAA Division I women's basketball season. The Musketeers, led by head coach Billi Chambers in her third season with the team, played their home games at the Cintas Center in Cincinnati, Ohio as a member of the Big East Conference.

== Previous season ==
The Musketeers finished the season with a record of 7–24 and 1–17 in Big East play to finish in last place for the third consecutive year. As the No.11 seed, they won in the first round to No.6 seed DePaul before losing to No.3 seed Seton Hall in the Big East women's tournament.

== Offseason ==
=== Departures ===
Xavier departures
| Name | Num | Pos. | Height | Year | Hometown | Reason for departure |
|---|---|---|---|---|---|---|
| Loren Christie | 1 | F | 6'3" | Graduate | London, England | Graduated |
| Aizhanique Mayo | 2 | G | 5'9" | RS sophomore | Bridgeport, CT | Transferred to DePaul |
| Júlia Garcia Roig | 4 | G | 5'7" | Sophomore | Barcelona, Spain | Transferred to Drexel |
| Tae'lor Purvis | 5 | G | 5'7" | Graduate | Houston, TX | Graduated |
| Daniela López | 7 | G | 5'10" | Sophomore | Barcelona, Spain | Transferred to East Tennessee State |
| Olivia Borsutzki | 21 | G | 5'11" | Freshman | Munich, Germany | Transferred to Omaha |
| Jordan Miller | 23 | F | 6'1" | Graduate | North Canton, OH | Graduated |
| Jovana Nikolić | 26 | F | 6'2" | Freshman | Belgrade, Serbia | Transferred to Lindenwood |
| Irune Orio | 31 | G | 6'2" | Junior | Balmaseda, Spain | Transferred to Pepperdine |

=== Incoming transfers ===
Xavier incoming transfers
| Name | Num | Pos. | Height | Year | Hometown | Previous school |
|---|---|---|---|---|---|---|
| Savannah White | 2 | G/F | 6'2" | Senior | St. Paul, MN | Indiana State |
| Mariyah Noel | 13 | G | 5'11" | Junior | Kansas City, KS | Ole Miss |
| Audia Young | 21 | G | 5'9" | RS junior | Tallahassee, FL | Auburn |
| Mya Moore | 44 | F | 6'2" | Senior | Milwaukee, WI | Cleveland State |

=== Recruiting ===
There was no recruiting class of 2025.

== Roster ==
2025–26 Xavier Musketeers women's basketball team
Players
Coaches

| Pos. | # | Name | Height | Year | Previous school | Hometown |
|---|---|---|---|---|---|---|
| G | 1 | Payton Richards | 5 ft 4 in (1.63 m) | Fr | Lake Travis | Austin, Texas |
| G/F | 2 | Savannah White | 6 ft 2 in (1.88 m) | Sr | DeLaSalle; Wisconsin; Indiana State | St. Paul, Minnesota |
| G/F | 3 | Kodee Williams-Sefo | 6 ft 1 in (1.85 m) | Fr | Westlake Girls | Auckland, New Zealand |
| G | 7 | Vivien Nejašmić | 6 ft 0 in (1.83 m) | So | Linigra | Split, Croatia |
| G | 8 | Meri Kanerva | 5 ft 9 in (1.75 m) | So | Mäkelänrinne Upper Secondary | Espoo, Finland |
| G/F | 10 | Denise Neves | 6 ft 1 in (1.85 m) | Fr | Lisbon, Portugal |
| G | 11 | Phoebe Holmes | 5 ft 7 in (1.7 m) | So | Mackay North State | North Mackay, Australia |
| G/F | 12 | MacKenzie Givens | 5 ft 8 in (1.73 m) | So | Princeton | Cincinnati, Ohio |
| G | 13 | Mariyah Noel | 5 ft 11 in (1.8 m) | Jr | Bonner Springs; Ole Miss | Kansas City, Kansas |
| F | 15 | Petra Oborilova | 6 ft 2 in (1.88 m) | Sr | Stredná Športová Škola; Iona | Banská Bystrica, Slovakia |
| G | 21 | Audia Young | 5 ft 11 in (1.8 m) | RS Jr | Florida High; Auburn | Kansas City, Kansas |
| F | 22 | Penda Dieng | 6 ft 3 in (1.91 m) | Fr | S3 Academy | Louga, Senegal |
| G/F | 24 | Lucía Martínez López | 6 ft 1 in (1.85 m) | So | Colegio Internacional San Fernando | Oviedo, Spain |
| G | 44 | Mya Moore | 6 ft 2 in (1.88 m) | Sr | Pius XI; Seattle; Cleveland State | Milwaukee, Wisconsin |

Head coach

- Billi Chambers (Hofstra)

Assistant coach(es)

- Ashlee Kelly (Quinnipiac)
- Brianna Sanders (Ohio State)
- Myia Johnson (Rutgers)

Legend

- (C) Team captain
- (S) Suspended
- (I) Ineligible
- (W) Walk-on
- Injured
- Current redshirt

Roster
Last update: November 30, 2024

== Schedule and results ==
| Date time, TV | Rank^{#} | Opponent^{#} | Result | Record | High points | High rebounds | High assists | Site (attendance) city, state |
Regular season
| November 4, 2025*; 6:30 p,m., ESPN+ | | New Haven | W 53–46 | 1–0 | 13 – Noel | 8 – Noel | 5 – White | Cintas Center (537); Cincinnati, OH |
| November 7, 2025*; 6:30 p.m., ESPN+ | | Purdue Fort Wayne | W 62–61 | 2–0 | 22 – Noel | 10 – Noel | 4 – Tied | Cintas Center (692); Cincinnati, OH |
| November 11, 2025*; 6:30 p.m., ESPN+ | | Dayton | L 66–71 | 2–1 | 22 – Noel | 13 – White | 3 – Tied | Cintas Center (689); Cincinnati, OH |
| November 14, 2025*; 6:30 p.m., ESPN+ | | Kent State | L 60–68 | 2–2 | 23 – Kanerva | 5 – Tied | 5 – Noel | Cintas Center (910); Cincinnati, OH |
| November 20, 2025*; 6:30 p.m., ESPN+ | | Ohio | W 74–53 | 3–2 | 20 – Givens | 12 – White | 5 – Tied | Cintas Center (964); Cincinnati, OH |
| November 24, 2025*; 6:30 p.m., ESPN+ | | at Akron | W 64–57 | 4–2 | 21 – Givens | 9 – Noel | 4 – Kanerva | James A. Rhodes Arena (800); Akron, OH |
| November 30, 2025; 2:30 p.m., FS1 | | No. 1 UConn | L 39–104 | 4–3 (0–1) | 12 – Nejasmic | 6 – Givens | 3 – Kanerva | Cintas Center (3,536); Cincinnati, OH |
| December 4, 2025; 11:00 a.m., ESPN+ | | Providence | W 61–47 | 5–3 (1–1) | 20 – Noel | 9 – White | 5 – White | Cintas Center (3,773); Cincinnati, OH |
| December 7, 2025*; 2:00 p.m., ESPN+ | | at Cincinnati; Skyline Chili Cross Shoutout | W 77–70 | 6–3 | 25 – Givens | 8 – Givens | 6 – Kanerva | Fifth Third Arena (4,059); Cincinnati, OH |
| December 9, 2025*; 6:30 p.m., ESPN+ | | LIU | W 64–57 | 7–3 | 18 – Givens | 11 – Givens | 5 – Kanerva | Cintas Center (547); Cincinnati, OH |
| December 14, 2025*; 1:00 p.m., ESPN+ | | Saint Francis | W 63–51 | 8–3 | 16 – Noel | 10 – Noel | 4 – Tied | Cintas Center (910); Cincinnati, OH |
| December 19, 2025; 7:00 p.m., ESPN+ | | at Butler | L 58–64 | 8–4 (1–2) | 24 – Nejašmić | 8 – Noel | 8 – Kanerva | Hinkle Fieldhouse (888); Indianapolis, IN |
| December 28, 2025; 1:00 p.m., ESPN+ | | at Seton Hall | L 55–75 | 8–5 (1–3) | 15 – Nejašmić | 6 – Tied | 4 – Kanerva | Walsh Gymnasium (958); South Orange, NJ |
| January 1, 2026; 1:00 p.m., ESPN+ | | at Marquette | L 54–67 | 8–6 (1–4) | 22 – Noel | 7 – Noel | 7 – Kanerva | Cintas Center (1,197); Cincinnati, OH |
| January 4, 2026; 2:00 p.m., ESPN+ | | at Georgetown | W 52–51 | 9–6 (2–4) | 14 – Kanerva | 11 – White | 7 – Kanerva | McDonough Arena (647); Washington, D.C. |
| January 8, 2026; 11:30 a.m., ESPN+ | | at Villanova | L 50–67 | 9–7 (2–5) | 16 – Tied | 6 – Tied | 7 – Noel | Finneran Pavilion (1,511); Villanova, PA |
| January 13, 2026; 6:30 p.m., ESPN+ | | DePaul | W 71–61 | 10–7 (3–5) | 18 – Givens | 13 – White | 5 – White | Cintas Center (943); Cincinnati, OH |
| January 17, 2026; 1:00 p.m., ESPN+ | | St. John's | L 64–66 | 10–8 (3–6) | 30 – Noel | 9 – Noel | 5 – Noel | Cintas Center (1,085); Cincinnati, OH |
| January 20, 2026; 7:00 p.m., ESPN+ | | at Creighton | L 64–82 | 10–9 (3–7) | 16 – Noel | 6 – Tied | 4 – Kanerva | D. J. Sokol Arena (865); Omaha, NE |
| January 24, 2026; 9:30 a.m., ESPN+ | | at Georgetown | L 52–65 | 10–10 (3–8) | 20 – Noel | 6 – Tied | 5 – Tied | Cintas Center (868); Cincinnati, OH |
| January 28, 2026; 8:00 p.m., Peacock | | at No. 1 UConn; Play4Kay Pink Game | L 39–97 | 10–11 (3–9) | 12 – Noel | 9 – White | 2 – Tied | Harry A. Gampel Pavilion (10,244); Storrs, CT |
| February 1, 2026; 1:00 p.m., ESPN+ | | Butler | W 63–59 | 9–13 (3–9) | 19 – Nejašmić | 8 – &White | 5 – Nejašmić | Cintas Center (990); Cincinnati, OH |
| February 4, 2026; 6:00 p.m., ESPN+ | | at St. John's | L 52–71 | 11–12 (4–10) | 20 – Noel | 11 – Noel | 5 – Oborilova | Carnesecca Arena (535); Queens, NY |
| February 8, 2026; 1:00 p.m., ESPN+ | | at Providence | L 50–66 | 11–13 (4–13) | 15 – Kanerva | 7 – White | 3 – Kanerva | Alumni Hall (1,004); Providence, RI |
| February 11, 2026; 6:30 p.m., ESPN+ | | Villanova | L 38–78 | 11–14 (4–12) | 13 – Kanerva | 6 – Martinez Lopez | 3 – Nejašmić | Cintas Center (1,069); Cincinnati, OH |
| February 18, 2026; 6:30 p.m., ESPN+ | | Seton Hall | L 55–64 | 11–15 (4–13) | 19 – Givens | 7 – Givens | 8 – Kanerva | Cintas Center (1,249); Cincinnati, OH |
| February 22, 2026; 3:00 p.m., ESPN+ | | at DePaul | L 67–76 | 11–16 (4–14) | 22 – Givens | 11 – White | 6 – Kanerva | Wintrust Arena (3,071); Chicago, IL |
| February 25, 2026; 7:30 p.m., ESPN+ | | at Marquette | L 65–77 | 11–17 (4–15) | 24 – Noel | 8 – Noel | 4 – White | Al McGuire Center (1,742); Milwaukee, WI |
| March 1, 2026; 1:00 p.m., ESPN+ | | Creighton | L 71–73 | 11–18 (4–16) | 19 – Kanerva | 13 – White | 7 – White | Cintas Center (1,601); Cincinnati, OH |
Big East tournament
| March 6, 2026; 3:00 p.m., Peacock | (11) | vs. (6) St. John's | L 48-53 | 11-19 | 11 – White | 12 – White | 4 – Tied | Mohegan Sun Arena; Uncasville, CT |
*Non-conference game. ^{#}Rankings from AP Poll. (#) Tournament seedings in parentheses. All times are in Eastern Time.

== See also ==
- 2025–26 Xavier Musketeers men's basketball team
