= 2025–26 Marquette Golden Eagles women's basketball team =

American college team

2025–26 Marquette Golden Eagles women's basketball
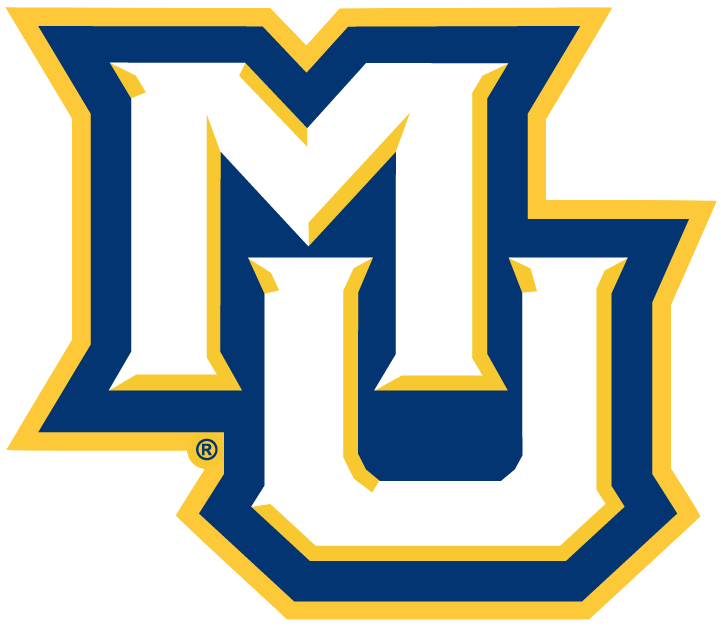
- Conference: Big East Conference
- Record: 18–12 (12–8 Big East)
- Head coach: Cara Consuegra (2nd season)
- Assistant coaches: Deont'a McChester; Khadijah Rushdan; Chaia Huff; Sam Logic; Michael Garven
- Home arena: Al McGuire Center

2025–26 Big East women's basketball standings
	Conf.				Overall
Team	W		L	PCT	W		L	PCT
No. 3 UConn †	20	–	0	1.000	38	–	1	.974
Villanova	16	–	4	.800	25	–	8	.758
Seton Hall	12	–	8	.600	19	–	13	.594
Marquette	12	–	8	.600	18	–	12	.600
Creighton	11	–	9	.550	16	–	15	.516
St. John's	11	–	9	.550	22	–	12	.647
Providence	7	–	13	.350	15	–	18	.455
Butler	6	–	14	.300	12	–	19	.387
Georgetown	6	–	14	.300	14	–	17	.452
DePaul	5	–	15	.250	8	–	24	.250
Xavier	4	–	16	.200	11	–	19	.367
† 2026 Big East tournament winner Rankings from AP poll

The 2025–26 Marquette Golden Eagles women's basketball team represents Marquette University during the 2025–26 NCAA Division I women's basketball season. The Golden Eagles, are led by second-year head coach Cara Consuegra and play their home games at the Al McGuire Center as members of the Big East Conference.

== Offseason ==
=== Incoming transfers ===
Marquette Incoming Transfers
Name	Num	Pos.	Height	Year	Hometown	Previous School
Jordan Meulemans	20	G	6'0"	Junior	De Pere, WI	Butler

==== Recruiting ====
College recruiting information
Name	Hometown	School	Height	Weight	Commit date
JJ Barnes; G	Racine, WI	The Prairie School	5 ft 9 in (1.75 m)	N/A	
JJ Barnes; G	Recruit ratings: No ratings found				
Kam Herring; G	Atlanta, GA	Woodward Academy	6 ft 1 in (1.85 m)	N/A	
Kam Herring; G	Recruit ratings: No ratings found				
Overall recruit ranking:
Note: In many cases, Scout, Rivals, 247Sports, On3, and ESPN may conflict in their listings of height and weight.; In these cases, the average was taken. ESPN grades are on a 100-point scale.; Sources: "2025 Player Commits". ESPN. Archived from the original on November 14, 2025.

== Roster ==
2025–26 Marquette Golden Eagles women's basketball team
Players
Coaches

Pos.	#	Name	Height	Year	Previous school	Hometown
G	1	Lee Volker	6 ft 1 in (1.85 m)	GS	Duke	Purcellville, Virginia
G	2	Jaidynn Mason	5 ft 6 in (1.68 m)	Sr	Southern Illinois	Kansas City, Missouri
F	4	Abbey Cracknell	5 ft 11 in (1.8 m)	GS	Gulf Coast State College	Avoca Beach, Australia
F	5	Charia Smith	6 ft 1 in (1.85 m)	RS Jr	Northland High School	Columbus, Ohio
G	7	Bridget Utberg	5 ft 5 in (1.65 m)	Sr	Central Michigan	Canton, Georgia
G	8	JJ Barnes	5 ft 9 in (1.75 m)	Fr	The Prairie School	Racine, Wisconsin
G	10	Kam Herring	6 ft 1 in (1.85 m)	Fr	Woodward Academy	Atlanta, Georgia
F	11	Skylar Forbes	6 ft 3 in (1.91 m)	Jr	Scarborough Prep	Markham, Ontario
F	14	Jada Bediako	6 ft 3 in (1.91 m)	Jr	Georgia Tech	Brampton, Ontario
G	20	Jordan Meulemans	6 ft 0 in (1.83 m)	Jr	Butler	De Pere, Wisconsin
G	21	Kennedi Perkins	5 ft 6 in (1.68 m)	Sr	Syracuse	Bolingbrook, Illinois
G	22	Halle Vice	6 ft 1 in (1.85 m)	Jr	Pleasant Valley	Bettendorf, Iowa
G	23	Olivia Porter	5 ft 8 in (1.73 m)	Sr	Charlotte	Chapel Hill, North Carolina
F	24	Ayuen Akot	5 ft 11 in (1.8 m)	Sr	Frank Phillips College	Melbourne, Australia
F	35	Aryelle Stevens	6 ft 1 in (1.85 m)	Sr	Gulf Coast State College	Pearland, Texas

Head coach

- Cara Consuegra (Iowa)

Assistant coach(es)

- Deont'a McChester (Keuka)
- Khadijah Rushdan (Rutgers)
- Chaia Huff (Moody Bible)
- Sam Logic (Iowa)
- Michael Garven (Marquette)

Legend

- (C) Team captain
- (S) Suspended
- (I) Ineligible
- (W) Walk-on
- Injured
- Current redshirt

Roster
Last update: November 14, 2025

== Schedule and results ==
Date time, TV	Rank^{#}	Opponent^{#}	Result	Record	High points	High rebounds	High assists	Site (attendance) city, state
Regular season
November 3, 2025*; 11:00 a.m., ESPN+		Winthrop	W 89–57	1–0	25 – Mason	11 – Vice	5 – 3 Tied	Al McGuire Center (3,750); Milwaukee, WI
November 8, 2025*; 2:00 p.m., ESPN+		Wisconsin	W 65–62	2–0	19 – Forbes	14 – Vice	4 – Forbes	Al McGuire Center (1,633); Milwaukee, WI
November 11, 2025*; 7:00 p.m., B1G+		at Minnesota	L 47–90	2–1	13 – Volker	9 – Vice	2 – 3 Tied	Williams Arena (2,999); Minneapolis, MN
November 14, 2025*; 6:30 p.m., ESPN+		Bowling Green	W 71–55	3–1	23 – Volker	7 – Volker	7 – Mason	Al McGuire Center (1,112); Milwaukee, WI
November 19, 2025*; 6:00 p.m., ESPN+		Milwaukee	W 75–43	4–1	23 – Vice	10 – Volker	6 – Mason	Al McGuire Center (822); Milwaukee, WI
November 28, 2025*; 10:00 a.m., FloHoops		vs. No. 10 Iowa State; Coconut Hoops Blue Heron Division semifinals	L 73–84	4–2	17 – Mason	5 – Vice	3 – Tied	Alico Arena (553); Fort Myers, FL
November 30, 2025*; 10:00 a.m., FloHoops		vs. Gonzaga; Coconut Hoops Blue Heron Division Consolation Game	L 61–65	4–3	24 – Forbes	8 – Vice	5 – Volker	Alico Arena (252); Fort Myers, FL
December 4, 2025; 8:00 p.m., Peacock		at DePaul	W 85–54	5–3 (1–0)	19 – Forbes	6 – Tied	4 – Tied	Wintrust Arena (1,031); Chicago, IL
December 7, 2025; 3:00 p.m., ESPN+		Butler	W 80–55	6–3 (2–0)	26 – Forbes	9 – Vice	7 – Mason	Al McGuire Center (1,304); Milwaukee, WI
December 14, 2025*; 1:00 p.m., ESPN+		Le Moyne	W 89–42	7–3	23 – Vice	10 – Vice	11 – Volker	Al McGuire Center (1,109); Milwaukee, WI
December 17, 2025; 6:00 p.m., Peacock		at No. 1 UConn	L 53–89	7–4 (2–1)	17 – Forbes	5 – Vice	3 – Mason	PeoplesBank Arena (12,348); Hartford, CT
December 20, 2025*; 7:00 p.m., ESPN+		Truman State	W 86–43	8–4	26 – Forbes	13 – Vice	8 – Porter	Al McGuire Center (1,416); Milwaukee, WI
December 29, 2025; 6:30 p.m., ESPN+		St. John's	L 66–73	8–5 (2–2)	16 – Forbes	10 – Vice	5 – Porter	Al McGuire Center (1,602); Milwaukee, WI
January 1, 2026; 7:00 p.m., ESPN+		at Xavier	W 67–54	9–5 (3–2)	20 – Vice	19 – Vice	6 – Mason	Cintas Center (1,197); Cincinnati, OH
January 4, 2026; 3:00 p.m., Peacock		Villanova	W 85–69	10–5 (4–2)	32 – Vice	11 – Vice	7 – Mason	Al McGuire Center (1,660); Milwaukee, WI
January 8, 2026; 7:00 p.m., TruTV		Creighton	W 67–49	11–5 (5–2)	23 – Porter	10 – Forbes	5 – Mason	Al McGuire Center (1,297); Milwaukee, WI
January 14, 2026; 7:00 p.m., ESPN+		at Seton Hall	L 61–64	11–6 (5–3)	20 – Volker	13 – Vice	9 – Mason	Walsh Gymnasium (729); South Orange, NJ
January 17, 2026; 7:00 p.m., ESPN+		Georgetown	L 54–63	11–7 (5–4)	16 – Volker	8 – Volker	2 – Tied	Al McGuire Center (1,953); Milwaukee, WI
January 21, 2026; 7:00 p.m., Peacock		at St. John's	W 56–55	12–7 (6–4)	12 – Forbes	9 – Volker	4 – Mason	Carnesecca Arena (528); Queens, NY
January 25, 2026; 7:00 p.m., ESPN+		at Butler	W 64–60	13–7 (7–4)	23 – Vice	5 – Vice	4 – Tied	Hinkle Fieldhouse (439); Indianapolis, IN
January 28, 2026; 6:30 p.m., ESPN+		DePaul	W 74–73	14–7 (8–4)	18 – Vice	14 – Vice	7 – Mason	Al McGuire Center (1,252); Milwaukee, WI
February 1, 2026; 4:00 p.m., TruTV		at Georgetown	W 67–59	15–7 (9–4)	22 – Volker	10 – Vice	5 – Vice	CareFirst Arena (523); Washington, D.C.
February 4, 2026; 6:30 p.m., ESPN+		Providence	W 78–61	16–7 (10–4)	22 – Forbes	10 – Vice	6 – Mason	Al McGuire Center (1,774); Milwaukee, WI
February 8, 2026; 12:00 p.m., FS1		at Creighton	L 74–80	16–8 (10–5)	21 – Forbes	8 – Vice	6 – Mason	Al McGuire Center (2,054); Milwaukee, WI
February 11, 2026; 6:30 p.m., ESPN+		Seton Hall	L 58–70	16–9 (10–6)	17 – Forbes	6 – Vice	4 – Mason	Al McGuire Center (1,394); Milwaukee, WI
February 14, 2026; 12:00 p.m., FS1		No. 1 UConn	L 56–71	16–10 (10–7)	15 – Volker	8 – Mason	5 – Mason	Al McGuire Center (3,953); Milwaukee, WI
February 22, 2026; 2:30 p.m., Peacock		at Villanova	L 39–64	16–11 (10–8)	11 – Volker	10 – Vice	2 – Mason	Finneran Pavilion (1,651); Villanova, PA
February 25, 2026; 6:30 p.m., ESPN+		Xavier	W 77–65	17–11 (11–8)	22 – Vice	8 – Vice	8 – Mason	Al McGuire Center (1,742); Milwaukee, WI
March 1, 2026; 4:30 p.m., Peacock		at Providence	W 69–65	18–11 (12–8)	24 – Forbes	12 – Volker	4 – Perkins	Alumni Hall; Providence, RI
Big East tournament
March 7, 2026; 1:30 p.m., Peacock/NBCSN	(4)	vs. (5) Creighton; Quarterfinals	L 44-57	18-12	16 – Forbes	11 – Vice	7 – Mason	Mohegan Sun Arena; Uncasville, Connecticut
*Non-conference game. ^{#}Rankings from AP Poll. (#) Tournament seedings in parentheses. All times are in Central Time.

== Rankings ==
Ranking movements
	Week																				
Poll	Pre	1	2	3	4	5	6	7	8	9	10	11	12	13	14	15	16	17	18	19	Final
AP																					Not released
Coaches																					

== See also ==
- 2025–26 Marquette Golden Eagles men's basketball team
