= 2025–26 Big East Conference women's basketball season =

- League: NCAA Division I
- Sport: Basketball
- Teams: 11
- TV partner(s): FOX Sports, NBC Sports, TNT Sports

Regular Season
- Season champions: UConn
- Runners-up: Villanova
- Season MVP: Sarah Strong

Tournament
- Venue: Mohegan Sun Arena, Uncasville, Connecticut
- Champions: UConn
- Runners-up: Villanova
- Finals MVP: Sarah Strong

Basketball seasons
- ← 2024–25 2026–27 →

2025–26 Big East women's basketball standings
| | Conf. | | | | Overall |
| Team | W | | L | PCT | W | | L | PCT |
|---|---|---|---|---|---|---|---|---|
| No. 3 UConn † | 20 | – | 0 | 1.000 | 38 | – | 1 | .974 |
| Villanova | 16 | – | 4 | .800 | 25 | – | 8 | .758 |
| Seton Hall | 12 | – | 8 | .600 | 19 | – | 13 | .594 |
| Marquette | 12 | – | 8 | .600 | 18 | – | 12 | .600 |
| Creighton | 11 | – | 9 | .550 | 16 | – | 15 | .516 |
| St. John's | 11 | – | 9 | .550 | 22 | – | 12 | .647 |
| Providence | 7 | – | 13 | .350 | 15 | – | 18 | .455 |
| Butler | 6 | – | 14 | .300 | 12 | – | 19 | .387 |
| Georgetown | 6 | – | 14 | .300 | 14 | – | 17 | .452 |
| DePaul | 5 | – | 15 | .250 | 8 | – | 24 | .250 |
| Xavier | 4 | – | 16 | .200 | 11 | – | 19 | .367 |
† 2026 Big East tournament winner Rankings from AP poll

The 2025–26 Big East women's basketball season began with practices in October 2025, followed by the start of the 2025–26 NCAA Division I women's basketball season, which began in November 2025. Conference play began in December 2025 and ended in March 2026.

== Preseason ==
=== Preseason Big East poll ===
Prior to the conference's annual media day, conference standings were projected by the coaches.

| Rank | Team | Points |
|---|---|---|
| 1. | UConn | 100 (10) |
| 2. | Marquette | 85 |
| 3. | Seton Hall | 80 (1) |
| 4. | Villanova | 78 |
| 5. | Creighton | 61 |
| 6. | St. John's | 56 |
| 7. | Georgetown | 48 |
| 8. | DePaul | 32 |
| 9. | Butler | 30 |
| 10. | Providence | 20 |
| 11. | Xavier | 15 |
(first place votes)

=== Preseason All-Big East ===
Coaches named a preseason All-Big East team and player of the year.

| Honor | Recipient |
|---|---|
| Preseason Player of the Year | Sarah Strong, UConn |
| Preseason Freshman of the Year | Kelis Fisher, UConn |
| Preseason All-Big East | KK Arnold, UConn |
| Preseason All-Big East | Azzi Fudd, UConn |
| Preseason All-Big East | Ashlynn Shade, UConn |
| Preseason All-Big East | Serah Williams, UConn |
| Preseason All-Big East | Skylar Forbes, Marquette, |
| Preseason All-Big East | Halle Vice, Marquette |
| Preseason All-Big East | Lee Volker, Marquette |
| Preseason All-Big East | Savannah Catalon, Seton Hall |
| Preseason All-Big East | Jada Eads, Seton Hall |
| Preseason All-Big East | Jasmine Bascoe, Villanova |
| Preseason All-Big Honorable Mention | Kate Clarke, DePaul |
| Preseason All-Big Honorable Mention | Victoria Rivera, Georgetown |
| Preseason All-Big Honorable Mention | Meri Kanerva, Xavier |

=== Preseason watchlists ===
Below is a table of notable preseason watch lists.

| Player | Wooden | Naismith | Lieberman | Drysdale | Miller | McClain | Leslie |
| Jasmine Bascoe, Villanova | ✓ | | | | | | |
| Caroline Ducharme, UConn | | | | | ✓ | | |
| Skylar Forbes, Marquette | | ✓ | | | | | |
| Azzi Fudd, UConn | ✓ | ✓ | | ✓ | | | |
| Kayleigh Heckel, UConn | ✓ | | | | | | |
| Sarah Strong, UConn | ✓ | ✓ | | | | ✓ | |
| Serah Williams, UConn | ✓ | ✓ | | | | | ✓ |

== Regular season ==
=== Rankings ===
Legend
| | Improvement in ranking |
| | Drop in ranking |
| | Not ranked previous week |
| RV | Received votes but were not ranked in Top 25 of poll |
| NV | No votes received |
| (Italics) | Number of first place votes |

| | | Pre/ Wk 1 | Wk 2 | Wk 3 | Wk 4 | Wk 5 | Wk 6 | Wk 7 | Wk 8 | Wk 9 | Wk 10 | Wk 11 | Wk 12 | Wk 13 | Wk 14 | Wk 15 | Wk 16 | Wk 17 | Wk 18 | Wk 19 | Wk 20 | Final |
|---|---|---|---|---|---|---|---|---|---|---|---|---|---|---|---|---|---|---|---|---|---|---|
| Butler | AP | NV | NV | NV | NV | NV | NV | NV | NV | NV | NV | NV | NV | NV | NV | NV | NV | NV | NV | NV | NV | NV |
| Butler | C | NV | NV | NV | NV | NV | NV | NV | NV | NV | NV | NV | NV | NV | NV | NV | NV | NV | NV | NV | NV | NV |
| UConn | AP | 1 (27) | 1 (30) | 1 (28) | 1 (30) | 1 (22) | 1 (23) | 1 (24) | 1 (25) | 1 (25) | 1 (28) | 1 (32) | 1 (30) | 1 (31) | 1 (31) | 1 (31) | 1 (31) | 1 (31) | 1 (31) | 1 (28) | 1 (28) | 3 |
| UConn | C | 1 (28) | 1 (29) | 1 (28) | 1 (29) | 1 (28) | 1 (28) | 1 (28) | 1 (28) | 1 (28) | 1 (28) | 1 (31) | 1 (31) | 1 (31) | 1 (31) | 1 (31) | 1 (31) | 1 (31) | 1 (31) | 1 (30) | 1 (30) | 3 |
| Creighton | AP | NV | NV | NV | NV | NV | NV | NV | NV | NV | NV | NV | NV | NV | NV | NV | NV | NV | NV | NV | NV | NV |
| Creighton | C | RV | NV | NV | NV | NV | NV | NV | NV | NV | NV | NV | NV | NV | NV | NV | NV | NV | NV | NV | NV | NV |
| DePaul | AP | NV | NV | NV | NV | NV | NV | NV | NV | NV | NV | NV | NV | NV | NV | NV | NV | NV | NV | NV | NV | NV |
| DePaul | C | NV | NV | NV | NV | NV | NV | NV | NV | NV | NV | NV | NV | NV | NV | NV | NV | NV | NV | NV | NV | NV |
| Georgetown | AP | NV | NV | NV | NV | NV | NV | NV | NV | NV | NV | NV | NV | NV | NV | NV | NV | NV | NV | NV | NV | NV |
| Georgetown | C | NV | NV | NV | NV | NV | NV | NV | NV | NV | NV | NV | NV | NV | NV | NV | NV | NV | NV | NV | NV | NV |
| Marquette | AP | NV | NV | NV | NV | NV | NV | NV | NV | NV | NV | NV | NV | NV | NV | NV | NV | NV | NV | NV | NV | NV |
| Marquette | C | NV | NV | NV | NV | NV | NV | NV | NV | NV | NV | NV | NV | NV | NV | NV | NV | NV | NV | NV | NV | NV |
| Providence | AP | NV | NV | NV | NV | NV | NV | NV | NV | NV | NV | NV | NV | NV | NV | NV | NV | NV | NV | NV | NV | NV |
| Providence | C | NV | NV | NV | NV | NV | NV | NV | NV | NV | NV | NV | NV | NV | NV | NV | NV | NV | NV | NV | NV | NV |
| Seton Hall | AP | NV | NV | NV | NV | NV | NV | NV | NV | NV | NV | NV | NV | NV | NV | NV | NV | NV | NV | NV | NV | NV |
| Seton Hall | C | NV | NV | NV | NV | NV | NV | NV | NV | NV | NV | NV | NV | NV | NV | NV | NV | NV | NV | NV | NV | NV |
| St. John's | AP | NV | NV | NV | NV | NV | NV | NV | NV | NV | NV | NV | NV | NV | NV | NV | NV | NV | NV | NV | NV | NV |
| St. John's | C | NV | NV | NV | NV | NV | NV | NV | NV | NV | NV | NV | NV | NV | NV | NV | NV | NV | NV | NV | NV | NV |
| Villanova | AP | NV | NV | NV | NV | NV | NV | NV | NV | NV | NV | NV | NV | NV | NV | NV | NV | RV | RV | RV | RV | RV |
| Villanova | C | NV | NV | NV | NV | NV | NV | NV | NV | NV | NV | NV | NV | NV | NV | NV | NV | NV | NV | RV | RV | NV |
| Xavier | AP | NV | NV | NV | NV | NV | NV | NV | NV | NV | NV | NV | NV | NV | NV | NV | NV | NV | NV | NV | NV | NV |
| Xavier | C | NV | NV | NV | NV | NV | NV | NV | NV | NV | NV | NV | NV | NV | NV | NV | NV | NV | NV | NV | NV | NV |

=== Big East Players of the Week ===
Throughout the conference regular season, the Big East offices named one or two players of the week and one or two freshmen of the week each Monday.

| Week | Player of the week | School | Freshman of the week | School |
|---|---|---|---|---|
| November 10, 2025 | Sarah Strong | UConn | Ally Timm | DePaul |
| November 17, 2025 | Sarah Strong (2) | UConn | Blanca Quiñónez | UConn |
| November 24, 2025 | Azzi Fudd | UConn | Blanca Quiñonez (2) | UConn |
| December 1, 2025 | Brooke Moore | St. John’s | Neleigh Gessert | Creighton |
| December 8, 2025 | Brynn McCurry | Villanova | Ava Zediker | Creighton |
| December 15, 2025 | Azzi Fudd (2) | UConn | Blanca Quiñonez (3) | UConn |
| December 22, 2025 | Sarah Strong (3) | UConn | Blanca Quiñonez (4) | UConn |
| December 29, 2025 | Mariana Valenzuela | Seton Hall | Blanca Quiñonez (5) | UConn |
| January 5, 2026 | Halle Vice | Marquette | Kennedy Henry | Villanova |
| January 12, 2026 | Sarah Strong (4) | UConn | Blanca Quiñonez (6) | UConn |
| January 19, 2026 | Sarah Strong (5) | UConn | Zahara Bishop | Seton Hall |
| January 26, 2026 | Sarah Strong (6) | UConn | Blanca Quiñonez (7) | UConn |
| February 2, 2026 | Allie Ziebell | UConn | Neleigh Gessert (2) | Creighton |
| February 9, 2026 | Azzi Fudd (3) | UConn | Ava Zediker (2) | Creighton |
| February 16, 2026 | Azzi Fudd (4) | UConn | Zahara Bishop (2) | Seton Hall |
| February 23, 2026 | Sarah Strong (7) | UConn | Zahara Bishop (3) | Seton Hall |

=== Conference matrix ===
This table summarizes the head-to-head results between teams in conference play. Each team is scheduled to play 20 conference games with at least one game against each opponent.

| | Butler | UConn | Creighton | DePaul | Georgetown | Marquette | Providence | Seton Hall | St. John's | Villanova | Xavier |
|---|---|---|---|---|---|---|---|---|---|---|---|
| vs. Butler | – | 2–0 | 2–0 | 0–2 | 1–1 | 2–0 | 1–1 | 1–1 | 2–0 | 2–0 | 1–1 |
| vs. UConn | 0–2 | – | 0–2 | 0–2 | 0–2 | 0–2 | 0–2 | 0–2 | 0–2 | 0–2 | 0–2 |
| vs. Creighton | 0–2 | 2–0 | – | 1–1 | 1–1 | 1–1 | 1–1 | 1–1 | 0–2 | 2–0 | 0–2 |
| vs. DePaul | 2–0 | 2–0 | 1–1 | – | 0–2 | 2–0 | 2–0 | 2–0 | 1–1 | 2–0 | 1–1 |
| vs. Georgetown | 1–1 | 2–0 | 1–1 | 2–0 | – | 1–1 | 2–0 | 2–0 | 0–2 | 2–0 | 1–1 |
| vs. Marquette | 0–2 | 2–0 | 1–1 | 0–2 | 1–1 | – | 0–2 | 2–0 | 1–1 | 1–1 | 0–2 |
| vs. Providence | 1–1 | 2–0 | 1–1 | 0–2 | 0–2 | 2–0 | – | 2–0 | 2–0 | 2–0 | 1–1 |
| vs. Seton Hall | 1–1 | 2–0 | 1–1 | 0–2 | 0–2 | 0–2 | 0–2 | – | 2–0 | 2–0 | 0–2 |
| vs. St. John's | 0–2 | 2–0 | 2–0 | 1–1 | 2–0 | 1–1 | 0–2 | 0–2 | – | 1–1 | 0–2 |
| vs. Villanova | 0–2 | 2–0 | 0–2 | 0–2 | 0–2 | 1–1 | 0–2 | 0–2 | 1–1 | – | 0–2 |
| vs. Xavier | 1–1 | 2–0 | 2–0 | 4–1 | 1–1 | 2–0 | 1–1 | 2–0 | 2–0 | 2–0 | – |
| Total | 6–14 | 20–0 | 11–9 | 5–15 | 6–14 | 12–8 | 7–13 | 12–8 | 11–9 | 16–4 | 4–16 |

== Honors and awards ==
=== Big East Awards ===
2026 Big East Women's Basketball Individual Awards
| Award | Recipient(s) |
| Player of the Year | Sarah Strong, UConn |
| Coach of the Year | Geno Auriemma, UConn |
| Defensive Player of the Year | Sarah Strong, UConn |
| Freshman of the Year | Blanca Quiñonez, UConn |
| Most Improved Player of the Year | Brynn McCurry, Villanova |
| Sixth Woman Award | Blanca Quiñonez, UConn |
| Sportsmanship Award | Meg Newman, DePaul |

2026 Big East Women's Basketball All-Conference Teams
| First Team | Second Team^ | Defensive Team | Freshman Team |
| KK Arnold, UConn †Azzi Fudd, UConn †Sarah Strong, UConn †Ava Zediker, Creighton †Skylar Forbes, Marquette †Halle Vice, Marquette †Sabou Gueye, Providence †Savannah Catalon, Seton Hall †Mariana Valenzuela, Seton Hall †Jasmine Bascoe, Villanova | Blanca Quiñonez, UConn; Kate Novik, DePaul; Lee Volker, Marquette; Brooke Moore, St. John’s; Brynn McCurry, Villanova; Mariyah Noel, Xavier | KK Arnold, UConn; Sarah Strong, UConn; Skylar Forbes, Marquette; Savannah Catalon, Seton Hall; Kennedy Henry, Villanova | †Blanca Quiñonez, UConn †Ava Zediker, Creighton †Neleigh Gessert, Creighton †Zahara Bishop, Seton Hall †Kennedy Henry, Villanova |
† - denotes unanimous selection^ - due to a tie in voting, there are six players on the Second Team

== Postseason ==
=== Big East Tournament ===
First round Friday, March 6 Peacock/NBCSN
8 | Georgetown | 62
9 | Butler | 58
7 | Providence | 69
10 | DePaul | 55
6 | St. John's | 53
11 | Xavier | 48

Quarterfinals; Saturday, March 7 Peacock/NBCSN
1 | 1 UConn | 84
8 | Georgetown | 39
4 | Marquette | 44
5 | Creighton | 57
2 | Villanova | 73
7 | Providence | 65
3 | Seton Hall | 63
6 | St. John's | 61

Semifinals; Sunday, March 8 Peacock/NBCSN
1 | 1 UConn | 100
5 | Creighton | 51
2 | Villanova | 62
3 | Seton Hall | 48

Championship; Monday, March 9 Peacock/NBCSN
1 | 1 UConn | 90
2 | Villanova | 51
