= 2025–26 Creighton Bluejays women's basketball team =

Intercollegiate basketball season

2025–26 Creighton Bluejays women's basketball
- Conference: Big East
- Record: 16–15 (11–9 Big East)
- Head coach: Jim Flanery (24th season)
- Assistant coaches: Carli Berger; Mike Jewett; Alexis Akin-Otiko
- Home arena: D. J. Sokol Arena

2025–26 Big East women's basketball standings
	Conf.				Overall
Team	W		L	PCT	W		L	PCT
No. 3 UConn †	20	–	0	1.000	38	–	1	.974
Villanova	16	–	4	.800	25	–	8	.758
Seton Hall	12	–	8	.600	19	–	13	.594
Marquette	12	–	8	.600	18	–	12	.600
Creighton	11	–	9	.550	16	–	15	.516
St. John's	11	–	9	.550	22	–	12	.647
Providence	7	–	13	.350	15	–	18	.455
Butler	6	–	14	.300	12	–	19	.387
Georgetown	6	–	14	.300	14	–	17	.452
DePaul	5	–	15	.250	8	–	24	.250
Xavier	4	–	16	.200	11	–	19	.367
† 2026 Big East tournament winner Rankings from AP poll

The 2025–26 Creighton Bluejays women's basketball team represent Creighton University in the 2025–26 NCAA Division I women's basketball season. The Bluejays, led by 24th-year head coach Jim Flanery, play their home games at D. J. Sokol Arena and are members of the Big East Conference.

== Offseason ==
=== Departures ===
Name	Number	Pos.	Height	Year	Hometown	Reason left
Sydney Golladay	3	G	6'1"	Graduate Student	Fremont, NE	Graduated
Jayme Horan	12	G	6'1"	Graduate Student	Omaha, NE	Graduated
Mallory Brake	14	F	6'0"	Senior	Hastings, MN	Graduated
Lauren Jensen	15	G	5'10"	Senior	Lakeville, MN	Graduated
Molly Mogensen	21	G	5'7"	Graduate Student	Farmington, MN	Graduated
Morgan Maly	30	G/F	6'1"	Senior	Crete, NE	Graduated
Brooke Littrell	33	G/F	6'2"	Graduate Student	Littleton, CO	Graduated

=== Incoming transfer ===
Name	Number	Pos.	Height	Year	Hometown	Previous school
Grace Boffeli	42	F	6'1"	Graduate Student	Eldridge, IA	Northern Iowa

=== Recruiting ===
==== 2025 recruiting class ====
College recruiting
Name	Hometown	School	Height	Weight	Commit date
Avery Cooper; F	Lake Zurich, IL	Lake Zurich	6 ft 1 in (1.85 m)	N/A	
Avery Cooper; F	Recruit ratings: No ratings found				
Tara Dacic; F	Belgrade, Serbia	Archbishop Riordan	6 ft 2 in (1.88 m)	N/A	
Tara Dacic; F	Recruit ratings: No ratings found				
Neleigh Gessert; G	Omaha, NE	Millard West	6 ft 0 in (1.83 m)	N/A	
Neleigh Gessert; G	Recruit ratings: ESPN: (92)				
Norah Gessert; G	Omaha, NE	Millard West	6 ft 0 in (1.83 m)	N/A	
Norah Gessert; G	Recruit ratings: ESPN: (91)				
Kendall McGee; G	Brooklyn Park, MN	Benilde-St. Margaret's	5 ft 10 in (1.78 m)	N/A	
Kendall McGee; G	Recruit ratings: No ratings found				
Ava Zediker; G	Des Moines, IA	Dowling Catholic	5 ft 10 in (1.78 m)	N/A	
Ava Zediker; G	Recruit ratings: ESPN: (92)				
Overall recruit ranking: ESPN: 6
Note: In many cases, Scout, Rivals, 247Sports, On3, and ESPN may conflict in their listings of height and weight.; In these cases, the average was taken. ESPN grades are on a 100-point scale.; Sources: "2025 Player Commits". ESPN. Archived from the original on September 21, 2025.

== Roster ==
2025–26 Creighton Bluejays women's basketball team
Players
Coaches

Pos.	#	Name	Height	Year	Previous school	Hometown
G	1	Kendall McGee	5 ft 10 in (1.78 m)	Fr	Benilde-St. Margaret's	Brooklyn Park,MN
G	2	Kennedy Townsend	5 ft 10 in (1.78 m)	Sr	Park Hill	Kansas City, MO
F	9	Tara Dacic	6 ft 2 in (1.88 m)	Fr	Archbishop Riordan	Belgrade, Serbia
G	11	Kiani Lockett	5 ft 8 in (1.73 m)	Sr	Minnetonka	Minneapolis, MN
G	13	Allison Heathcock	6 ft 1 in (1.85 m)	So	Edmond North	Edmond, OK
F	22	Avery Cooper	6 ft 1 in (1.85 m)	Fr	Lake Zurich	Lake Zurich, IL
G	23	Neleigh Gessert	6 ft 0 in (1.83 m)	Fr	Millard West	Omaha, NE
G	24	Ava Zediker	5 ft 10 in (1.78 m)	Fr	Dowling Catholic	Des Moines, IA
G	30	Norah Gessert	6 ft 0 in (1.83 m)	Fr	Millard West	Omaha, NE
C	35	Elizabeth Gentry	6 ft 3 in (1.91 m)	So	Arapahoe	Littleton, CO
F	42	Grace Boffeli	6 ft 1 in (1.85 m)	GS	Northern Iowa	Eldridge, IA

Head coach

- Jim Flanery (Creighton)

Assistant coach(es)

- Carli Berger (Creighton)
- Mike Jewett (South Dakota)
- Alexis Akin-Otiko (Creighton)

Legend

- (C) Team captain
- (S) Suspended
- (I) Ineligible
- (W) Walk-on
- Injured
- Current redshirt

Roster
Last update: September 21, 2025

== Schedule and results ==
Date time, TV	Rank^{#}	Opponent^{#}	Result	Record	High points	High rebounds	High assists	Site (attendance) city, state
Exhibition
October 22, 2025*; 6:00 p.m.		Missouri Western	W 117–66		–	–	–	D. J. Sokol Arena; Omaha, NE
October 26, 2025*; 12:00 p.m.		vs. North Dakota State	W 64–61		–	–	–	Sanford Pentagon; Sioux Falls, SD
Regular season
November 3, 2025*; 6:00 p.m., ESPN+		South Dakota State	L 62–78	0–1	17 – Zediker	6 – Townsend	6 – Lockett	D. J. Sokol Arena (1,489); Omaha, NE
November 9, 2025*; 2:00 p.m., ESPN+		at Drake	W 83–74	1–1	25 – Lockett	11 – Boffeli	7 – Lockett	Knapp Center (2,587); Des Moines, IA
November 12, 2025*; 8:00 p.m., FS1		at Nebraska	L 50–84	1–2	14 – Zediker	9 – Gentry	2 – 3 Tied	Pinnacle Bank Arena (5,110); Lincoln, NE
November 20, 2025*; 6:00 p.m., ESPN+		Northern Iowa	L 50–51	1–3	10 – Gentry	10 – Boffeli	3 – 2 Tied	D. J. Sokol Arena (1,429); Omaha, NE
November 26, 2025*; 2:00 p.m.		at UNLV; UNLV Thanksgiving Turkey Tip-Off	L 67–76	1–4	17 – Kennedy	8 – Boffeli	8 – Zedicker	Thomas & Mack Center; Paradise, NV
November 28, 2025*; 2:00 p.m.		vs. Northern Arizona; UNLV Thanksgiving Turkey Tip-Off	W 86–62	2–4	15 – Heathcock	11 – Boffeli	8 – Townsend	Thomas & Mack Center; Paradise, NV
December 4, 2025; 6:00 p.m., ESPN+		at St. Johns	W 60–52	3–4 (1–0)	18 – Townsend	10 – Boffeli	7 – Townsend	Carnesecca Arena (535); Queens, NY
December 7, 2025*; 1:00 p.m., ESPN+		Tulsa	W 73–60	4–4	26 – Zedicker	10 – Boffeli	5 – Zedicker	D. J. Sokol Arena (1,003); Omaha, NE
December 14, 2025*; 1:00 p.m., FS1		Kansas State	L 71–75	4–5	16 – Tied	8 – Tied	5 – McGee	D. J. Sokol Arena; Omaha, NE
December 17, 2025*; 6:30 p.m., SLN		at Omaha	W 92–48	5–5	25 – Ne. Gessert	8 – Boffeli	5 – McGee	Baxter Arena (2,839); Omaha, NE
December 20, 2025; 1:00 p.m., ESPN+		DePaul	W 70–50	6–5 (2–0)	17 – Boffeli	11 – Boffeli	5 – Townsend	D. J. Sokol Arena (984); Omaha, NE
December 22, 2025; 3:00 p.m., ESPN+		Seton Hall	L 79–88	6–6 (2–1)	25 – Zediker	6 – Zediker	8 – Zediker	D. J. Sokol Arena (1,052); Omaha, NE
December 28, 2025; 5:00 p.m., truTV		at Georgetown	L 74–76	6–7 (2–2)	30 – Townsend	14 – Boffeli	4 – Zediker	McDonough Arena (627); Washington, D.C.
January 1, 2026; 11:00 a.m., ESPN+		at Villanova	L 64–74	6–8 (2–3)	25 – Ne. Gessert	8 – Heathcock	5 – McGee	Finneran Pavilion (1,527); Villanova, PA
January 4, 2026; 1:00 p.m., ESPN+		Butler	W 67–59	7–8 (3–3)	16 – Tied	8 – Townsend	4 – Tied	D. J. Sokol Arena (1,003); Omaha, NE
January 8, 2026; 7:00 p.m., truTV		at Marquette	L 49–67	7–9 (3–4)	14 – McGee	5 – Townsend	2 – Tied	Al McGuire Center (1,297); Milwaukee, WI
January 11, 2026; 1:00 p.m., truTV		No. 1 UConn	L 54–95	7–10 (3–5)	24 – Zediker	6 – McGee	5 – Heathcock	CHI Health Center (6,372); Omaha, NE
January 17, 2026; 12:00 p.m., ESPN+		at Providence	L 77–80	7–11 (3–6)	17 – Zediker	7 – Boffeli	4 – Tied	Alumni Hall (989); Providence, RI
January 20, 2026; 6:00 p.m., ESPN+		Xavier	W 82–64	8–11 (4–6)	18 – Boffeli	15 – Boffeli	5 – Heathcock	D. J. Sokol Arena (865); Omaha, NE
January 25, 2026; 2:00 p.m., ESPN+		at DePaul	L 61–76	8–12 (4–7)	19 – Zediker	10 – Boffeli	3 – Tied	Wintrust Arena (1,675); Chicago, IL
January 28, 2026; 6:00 p.m., ESPN+		St. Johns	W 81–57	9–12 (5–7)	18 – Zediker	7 – Tied	4 – Tied	D. J. Sokol Arena (735); Omaha, NE
February 1, 2026; 2:00 p.m., truTV		at Seton Hall	W 72–66	10–12 (6–7)	16 – Ne. Gessert	10 – Heathcock	4 – Zediker	Walsh Gymnasium (1,213); South Orange, NJ
February 4, 2026; 6:00 p.m., ESPN+		Georgetown	W 64–62	11–12 (7–7)	31 – Ne. Gessert	17 – Boffeli	5 – McGee	D. J. Sokol Arena (1,090); Omaha, NE
February 8, 2026; 12:00 p.m., FS1		Marquette	W 80–74	12–12 (8–7)	25 – Zediker	14 – Boffeli	6 – Zediker	D. J. Sokol Arena (2,054); Omaha, NE
February 11, 2026; 6:00 p.m., Peacock		at No. 1 UConn	L 44–94	12–13 (8–8)	23 – Zediker	9 – Boffeli	5 – Heathcock	Harry A. Gampel Pavilion (6,372); Storrs, CT
February 15, 2026; 4:00 p.m., truTV		Villanova	L 64–74	12–14 (8–9)	23 – Townsend	13 – Boffeli	5 – Zedicker	D. J. Sokol Arena (1,465); Omaha, NE
February 18, 2026; 6:00 p.m., ESPN+		at Butler	W 67–58	13–14 (9–9)	15 – Boffeli	9 – Boffeli	3 – Boffeli	Hinkle Fieldhouse (1,210); Indianapolis, IN
February 26, 2026; 8:00 p.m., TNT		Providence	W 69–49	14–14 (10–9)	20 – Zediker	8 – Heathcock	5 – Boffeli	D. J. Sokol Arena (1,157); Omaha, NE
March 1, 2026; 12:00 p.m., ESPN+		at Xavier	W 73–71	15–14 (11–9)	20 – Boffeli	10 – Boffeli	8 – McGee	Cintas Center (1,601); Cincinnati, OH
Big East Women's Tournament
March 7, 2026; 1:30 p.m., Peacock/NBCSN	(5)	vs. (4) Marquette; Quarterfinals	W 57–44	16–14	17 – Townsend	6 – Tied	4 – Zediker	Mohegan Sun Arena; Uncasville, CT
March 8, 2026; 1:30 p.m., Peacock/NBCSN	(5)	vs. (1) No. 1 UConn; Semifinals	L 51-100	16-15	13 – Townsend	7 – Boffeli	4 – Heathcock	Mohegan Sun Arena; Uncasville, CT
*Non-conference game. ^{#}Rankings from AP Poll. (#) Tournament seedings in parentheses. All times are in Central.

== Rankings ==
Ranking movements Legend: — = Not ranked RV = Received votes
	Week																				
Poll	Pre	1	2	3	4	5	6	7	8	9	10	11	12	13	14	15	16	17	18	19	Final
AP	—																				
Coaches	RV																				

== See also ==
- 2025–26 Creighton Bluejays men's basketball team
