= 2025–26 Providence Friars women's basketball team =

Intercollegiate basketball season

2025–26 Providence Friars women's basketball
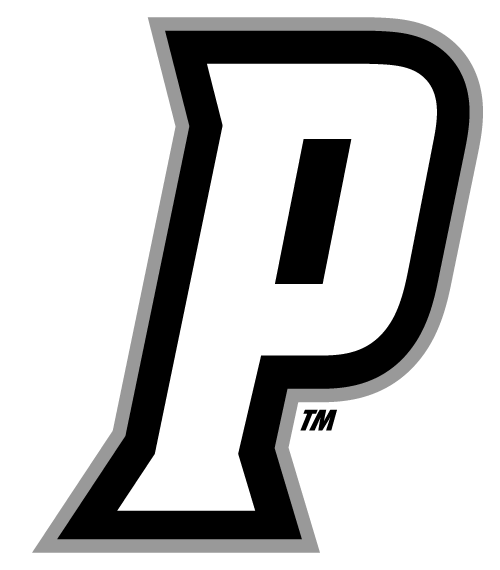
- Conference: Big East Conference
- Record: 15–18 (7–13 Big East)
- Head coach: Erin Batth (3rd season)
- Assistant coaches: Valerie Nainima; Molly Reagan; Sharon Baldwin; Elissa Cunane
- Home arena: Alumni Hall

2025–26 Big East women's basketball standings
	Conf.				Overall
Team	W		L	PCT	W		L	PCT
No. 3 UConn †	20	–	0	1.000	38	–	1	.974
Villanova	16	–	4	.800	25	–	8	.758
Seton Hall	12	–	8	.600	19	–	13	.594
Marquette	12	–	8	.600	18	–	12	.600
Creighton	11	–	9	.550	16	–	15	.516
St. John's	11	–	9	.550	22	–	12	.647
Providence	7	–	13	.350	15	–	18	.455
Butler	6	–	14	.300	12	–	19	.387
Georgetown	6	–	14	.300	14	–	17	.452
DePaul	5	–	15	.250	8	–	24	.250
Xavier	4	–	16	.200	11	–	19	.367
† 2026 Big East tournament winner Rankings from AP poll

The 2025–26 Providence Friars women's basketball team will represent Providence College in the 2025–26 NCAA Division I women's basketball season. The Friars are led by third year head coach Erin Batth and play their home games at Alumni Hall as members of the Big East Conference.

== Previous season ==
The Friars finished the season with a record of 13–19 and 6–12 in Big East, finishing in 7th in the conference. They lost in the first round to No.10 Georgetown in the 2025 Big East women's basketball tournament.

== Offseason ==
=== Departures ===
Providence Departures
Name	Num	Pos.	Height	Year	Hometown	Reason for Departure
Kylee Sheppard	1	G	5'9"	Senior	Cincinnati, OH	Graduated
Grace Efosa	2	G	5'11"	Graduate	Lawrence, MA	Graduated
Ugne Sirtautaite	10	F	6'1"	Sophomore	Kaunas, Lithuania	Transferred to Fordham
Nariah Scott	11	G	5'10"	Senior	Holden, MA	Graduated
Marta Morales Romero	13	G/F	6'1"	Senior	Granada, Spain	Graduated
MacKayla Scarlett	15	G	5'10"	Graduate	Bronx, NY	Graduated
Brynn Farrell	22	G	6'0"	Graduate	Ortley Beach, NJ	Graduated
Sarah Bandoma	23	F	6'3"	Senior	Johnston, RI	Graduated
Audrey Koch	24	G	5'10"	Senior	Iowa City, IA	Graduated
Olivia Olsen	31	F	6'3"	Senior	Niskayuna, NY	Graduated
Emily Archibald	33	F	6'0"	Senior	Kennebunk, ME	Graduated

=== Incoming transfers ===
Providence incoming transfers
Name	Num	Pos.	Height	Year	Hometown	Previous School
Sabou Gueye	0	G	5'9"	Graduate	Dakar, Senegal	Florida A&M
Nalani Kaysia (Note: Kaysia joined the team mid-season in December 2025 as a mid-year graduate transfer.)	8	F	6'2"	Graduate	Washington, D.C.	George Mason
Teneisia Brown	20	F	6'2"	Graduate	Montego Bay, Jamaica	Fairleigh Dickinson
Payton Dunbar	21	G	5'11"	Sophomore	Narrows, VA	Virginia
Eseosa Imafidon	22	C	6'5"	Junior	Benin City, Nigeria	Louisville

==== Recruiting ====
There was no recruiting class of 2025.

== Roster ==
2024–25 Providence Friars women's basketball team
Players
Coaches

Pos.	#	Name	Height	Year	Previous school	Hometown
G	0	Sabou Gueye	5 ft 9 in (1.75 m)	GS	Putnam Science; New Mexico State; Florida A&M	Dakar, Senegal
G	1	Mariana Padilla	5 ft 5 in (1.65 m)	So	Dexter Southfield	Newton, MA
G	2	Princess Moody	5 ft 8 in (1.73 m)	Fr	Bishop McNamara	La Plata, MD
G	3	Orlagh Gormley	5 ft 6 in (1.68 m)	So	Dexter Southfield	Quincy, MA
F	8	Nalani Kaysia	6 ft 2 in (1.88 m)	GS	Sidwell Friends School; George Mason	Washington, D.C.
G/F	10	Audrey Shields	6 ft 1 in (1.85 m)	So	Emma Willard	Troy, MY
G	11	Riley Hamburger	6 ft 0 in (1.83 m)	Fr	Paul VI	Aldie, VA
G	12	Olivia Rodrigues	6 ft 1 in (1.85 m)	Fr	Tabor Academy	New Bedford, MA
F/C	15	Sam Mancini	6 ft 4 in (1.93 m)	RS Fr	Webb City	Webb City, MO
F	20	Teneisia Brown	6 ft 2 in (1.88 m)	GS	St. Andrew's School; Fairleigh Dickinson	Montego Bay, Jamaica
G	21	Payton Dunbar	6 ft 1 in (1.85 m)	Fr	Jefferson Christian; Virginia	Narrows, VA
C	22	Eseosa Imafidon	6 ft 5 in (1.96 m)	Jr	Proctor Academy; Louisville	Benin City, Nigeria
F	23	Ashley Dinges	6 ft 1 in (1.85 m)	Fr	Noble and Greenough	Haverhill, MA
G	33	Sophi Hall	5 ft 11 in (1.8 m)	Fr	Holy Family HS	Carver, MN

Head coach

- Erin Batth (Clemson)

Assistant coach(es)

- Valerie Nainima (South Carolina)
- Molly Reagan (Liberty)
- Sharon Baldwin
- Elissa Cunane (NC State

Legend

- (C) Team captain
- (S) Suspended
- (I) Ineligible
- (W) Walk-on
- Injured
- Current redshirt

Roster

== Schedule and results ==
Date time, TV	Rank^{#}	Opponent^{#}	Result	Record	High points	High rebounds	High assists	Site (attendance) city, state
Exhibition
October 29, 2025*; 7:00 p.m.		Franklin Pierce	W 71–38		12 – Tied	6 – Dinges	5 – Brown	Alumni Hall (333); Providence, RI
Regular season
November 4, 2025*; 7:00 p.m., ESPN+		Howard	L 56–68	0–1	16 – Gueye	7 – Moody	4 – Dunbar	Alumni Hall (512); Providence, RI
November 10, 2025*; 7:00 p.m., ESPN+		Central Connecticut	W 65–40	1–1	16 – Gueye	14 – Brown	6 – Gormley	Alumni Hall (668); Providence, RI
November 15, 2025*; 1:00 p.m., ESPN+		Boston College	W 70–61	2–1	22 – Dunbar	12 – Gueye	5 – Gormley	Alumni Hall (714); Providence, RI
November 18, 2025*; 11:00 a.m., ESPN+		Northeastern	W 50–45	3–1	21 – Gueye	9 – Brown	3 – Gormley	Alumni Hall (1,108); Providence, RI
November 21, 2025*; 7:00 p.m., ESPN+		Yale	W 75–64	4–1	22 – Gueye	6 – Tied	5 – Gueye	Alumni Hall (652); Providence, RI
November 24, 2025*; 12:00 p.m., CBSSN		vs. Middle Tennessee; Emerald Coast Classic semifinals	L 48–54	4–2	13 – Tied	8 – Gormley	3 – Gormley	Raider Arena (500); Niceville, FL
November 25, 2025*; 12:00 p.m., CBSSN		vs. Alcorn State; Emerald Coast Classic Consolation Game	W 64–33	5–2	19 – Dunbar	6 – Gueye	4 – Gormley	Raider Arena (200); Niceville, FL
November 30, 2025*; 1:00 p.m., ESPN+		Bryant	W 62–53	6–2	18 – Gueye	14 – Brown	3 – Moody	Alumni Hall (715); Providence, RI
December 4, 2025; 11:00 a.m., ESPN+		at Xavier	L 47–61	6–3 (0–1)	16 – Gueye	12 – Gueye	7 – Gormley	Cintas Center (3,773); Cincinnati, OH
December 7, 2025; 2:00 p.m., ESPN+		at St. John's	L 55–62	6–4 (0–2)	12 – Tied	10 – Brown	6 – Gueye	Carnesecca Arena (838); Queens, NY
December 10, 2025*; 7:00 p.m., ESPN+		Rhode Island	L 51–57	6–5	17 – Brown	7 – Gormley	8 – Gormley	Alumni Hall (832); Providence, RI
December 13, 2025*; 1:00 p.m., ESPN+		Stonehill	W 63–51	7–5	13 – Dinges	9 – Dinges	4 – Gormley	Alumni Hall (753); Providence, RI
December 21, 2025; 1:00 p.m., ESPN+		Georgetown	W 68–61	8–5 (1–2)	23 – Gueye	8 – Gueye	6 – Gormley	Alumni Hall (645); Providence, RI
December 28, 2025*; 12:00 p.m., SECN		at No. 3 South Carolina	L 55–96	8–6	16 – Gueye	11 – Kaysia	5 – Gormley	Colonial Life Arena (15,065); Columbia, SC
December 31, 2025; 3:00 p.m., Peacock		No. 1 UConn	L 53–90	8–7 (1–3)	12 – Gueye	6 – Gormley	5 – Gormley	Amica Mutual Pavilion (5,240); Providence, RI
January 4, 2026; 3:00 p.m., ESPN+		at DePaul	W 69–59	9–7 (2–3)	17 – Gueye	6 – Dinges	5 – Tied	Wintrust Arena (1,580); Chicago, IL
January 8, 2026; 7:00 p.m., ESPN+		Seton Hall	L 48–58	9–8 (2–4)	13 – Dunbar	11 – Gueye	5 – Gormley	Alumni Hall (667); Providence, RI
January 11, 2026; 12:00 p.m., truTV		Villanova	L 55–85	9–9 (2–5)	13 – Dunbar	12 – Kaysia	5 – Gueye	Alumni Hall (816); Providence, RI
January 14, 2026; 7:00 p.m., ESPN+		at Butler	L 52–62	9–10 (2–6)	22 – Gueye	8 – Gueye	4 – Brown	Hinkle Fieldhouse (777); Indianapolis, IN
January 17, 2026; 1:00 p.m., ESPN+		Creighton	W 80–77	10–10 (3–6)	22 – Gueye	7 – Gueye	4 – Gormley	Alumni Hall (989); Providence, RI
January 20, 2026; 7:00 p.m., ESPN+		at Seton Hall	L 57–73	10–11 (3–7)	15 – Gueye	9 – Gueye	4 – Gueye	Walsh Gymnasium (879); South Orange, NJ
January 27, 2026; 7:00 p.m., ESPN+		at Villanova	L 68–83	10–12 (3–8)	22 – Gueye	6 – Tied	5 – Gueye	Finneran Pavilion (1,069); Villanova, PA
January 31, 2026; 1:00 p.m., ESPN+		St. John's	L 57–62	10–13 (3–9)	16 – Abies	11 – Abies	5 – Donald	Alumni Hall (804); Providence, RI
February 4, 2026; 7:30 p.m., ESPN+		at Marquette	L 61–78	10–14 (3–10)	24 – Brown	7 – Gormley	4 – Gormley	Al McGuire Center; Milwaukee, WI
February 8, 2026; 1:00 p.m., ESPN+		Xavier	W 66–50	11–14 (4–10)	29 – Gueye	9 – Gueye	4 – Tied	Alumni Hall (1,004); Providence, RI
February 11, 2026; 7:00 p.m., ESPN+		Butler	W 73–64	12–14 (5–10)	19 – Gueye	8 – Tied	4 – Dinges	Alumni Hall (678); Providence, RI
February 14, 2026; 2:00 p.m., ESPN+		at Georgetown	W 59–54	13–14 (6–10)	17 – Gueye	7 – Gueye	3 – Gormley	McDonough Arena (741); Washington, D.C.
February 18, 2026; 7:00 p.m., ESPN+		DePaul	W 66–60	14–14 (7–10)	18 – Gormley	12 – Brown	3 – Brown	Alumni Hall (795); Providence, RI
February 22, 2026; 12:00 p.m., FS1		at No. 1 UConn	L 38–81	14–15 (7–11)	11 – Moody	6 – Tied	4 – Gormley	Harry A. Gampel Pavilion (10,244); Storrs, CT
February 26, 2026; 9:00 p.m., truTV		at Creighton	L 49–69	14–16 (7–12)	13 – Gueye	11 – Gormley	3 – Gormley	D. J. Sokol Arena (1,157); Omaha, NE
March 1, 2026; 5:30 pm, Peacock		Marquette	L 65–69	14–17 (7–13)	20 – Gueye	9 – Gueye	5 – Gueye	Alumni Hall; Providence, RI
[[2026 Big East women's basketball tournament|Big East tournament]]
March 6, 2026; 1:30 p.m., Peacock/NBCSN	(7)	vs. (10) DePaul; First Round	W 69-55	15-17	31 – Gueye	14 – Brown	7 – Gormley	Mohegan Sun Arena; Uncasville, CT
March 7, 2026; 7:00 p.m., Peacock/NBCSN	(7)	vs. (2) Villanova; Second Round	L 65-73	15-18	19 – Tied	8 – Tied	2 – Tied	Mohegan Sun Arena; Uncasville, CT
*Non-conference game. ^{#}Rankings from AP Poll. (#) Tournament seedings in parentheses. All times are in Eastern Time.

== See also ==
- 2025–26 Providence Friars men's basketball team
