= 2026 Women's Basketball Invitation Tournament =

Women's college basketball tournament

2026 WBIT
- Season: 2025–26
- Teams: 32
- Finals site: Charles Koch Arena, Wichita, Kansas
- Champions: Columbia (1st title)
- Runner-up: BYU (1st title game)
- Semifinalists: Kansas (1st semifinal); Wisconsin (1st semifinal)
- Winning coach: Megan Griffith (1st title)
- MVP: Riley Weiss (Columbia)

The 2026 Women's Basketball Invitation Tournament (WBIT) was a single-elimination tournament of 32 NCAA Division I women's college basketball teams not selected to participate in the 2026 NCAA tournament. The tournament began on March 19 and ended on April 1. The first three rounds were played on the campuses of various schools, and the semifinal and championship games were played at Charles Koch Arena in Wichita, Kansas.

The Columbia Lions won the 2026 WBIT 81–64 over the BYU Cougars, becoming the first team from a mid-major conference to win the tournament title.

== Participants ==
Teams and pairings for the 2026 WBIT were released by the WBIT committee on Sunday, March 15, 2026. Thirty-two teams qualified for the WBIT, including both automatic qualifiers and at-large selections.

=== Automatic qualifiers ===
The regular-season champion of any NCAA Division I conference (as determined by the conference's tiebreaking protocol) not otherwise selected for the NCAA Division I women's basketball tournament will, if eligible, secure an automatic qualification invitation to the WBIT. Like the Division I tournament committee, the WBIT selection committee used a variety of resources to determine the participating teams.

Team	Conference	Record	Appearance	Last bid
Alabama A&M	SWAC	22–10	1st	Never
Chattanooga	Southern	20–10	1st	Never
Eastern Kentucky	ASUN	24–8	1st	Never
Georgia Southern	Sun Belt	23–7	1st	Never
Louisiana Tech	CUSA	26–6	1st	Never
Loyola Marymount	WCC	26–6	1st	Never
McNeese	Southland	28–5	1st	Never
Navy	Patriot	22–8	1st	Never
North Dakota State	Summit	28–4	1st	Never
Quinnipiac	MAAC	26–6	2nd	2025
Rice	American	28–5	1st	Never
San Diego State	Mountain West	25–5	1st	Never
UC Irvine	Big West	26–6	1st	Never

=== At-large bids ===
The following teams were awarded at-large bids.

Team	Conference	Record	Appearance	Last bid
BYU	Big 12	22–11	2nd	2024
California	ACC	19–14	2nd	2024
Columbia	Ivy	20–8	1st	Never
Georgia Tech	ACC	14–18	2nd	2024
George Mason	Atlantic 10	23–9	2nd	2024
Harvard	Ivy	18–11	1st	Never
Kansas	Big 12	19–13	1st	Never
Kansas State	Big 12	18–17	1st	Never
Miami (FL)	ACC	17–14	1st	Never
Missouri	SEC	16–16	1st	Never
Oregon State	WCC	23–11	1st	Never
Santa Clara	WCC	24–9	2nd	2024
Seton Hall	Big East	19–12	3rd	2025
St. John's	Big East	22–11	2nd	2024
Stanford	ACC	19–13	2nd	2025
Texas A&M	SEC	14–12	1st	Never
Troy	Sun Belt	25–7	1st	Never
Utah	Big 12	19–12	1st	Never
Wisconsin	Big Ten	13–17	1st	Never

== Bracket ==
* – Denotes overtime period.
First and second round games are hosted at campus sites of higher seed unless stated otherwise.

First round March 19; Campus sites
1	BYU	72
Alabama A&M	47
4	Missouri	67
Seton Hall (Note: Due to facilities conflicts with Missouri, Seton Hall hosted the first round game.)	57
3	George Mason	64
Quinnipiac	71
2	Stanford	80
Loyola Marymount	76

Second round March 22-23; Campus sites
1	BYU	93
4	Missouri	75
Quinnipiac	69
2	Stanford	81

Quarterfinal; March 26; Campus sites
1	BYU	76
2	Stanford	61

First round March 19; Campus sites
1	Texas A&M	48
McNeese	68
4	San Diego State (Note: Due to San Diego State hosting first and second round games of the NCAA men's tournament, University of San Diego hosted the first and second round games.)	61
UC Irvine	55
3	Rice	66
Louisiana Tech	61
2	Kansas	79
Troy	70

Second round March 22; Campus sites
McNeese	41
4	San Diego State	56
3	Rice	55
2	Kansas	62

Quarterfinal; March 26; Campus sites
4	San Diego State	78
2	Kansas	85

First round March 19; Campus sites
1	North Dakota State	75
Chattanooga	62
4	Columbia	74
St. John's	26
3	California	72
Santa Clara	68
2	Kansas State	69
Georgia Tech	65

Second round March 22; Campus sites
1	North Dakota State	57
4	Columbia	86
3	California	83
2	Kansas State	75

Quarterfinal; March 26; Campus sites
4	Columbia	74
3	California	68

First round March 19; Campus sites
1	Utah	58
Eastern Kentucky (Note: Due to facilities conflicts with Utah, Eastern Kentucky hosted the first round game.)	72
4	Harvard	73
Navy	52
3	Wisconsin	62
Oregon State (Note: Due to facilities conflicts with Wisconsin, Oregon State hosted the first round game.)	58
2	Miami (FL)	82
Georgia Southern	56

Second round March 22; Campus sites
Eastern Kentucky	34
4	Harvard	63
3	Wisconsin	72
2	Miami (FL)	65

Quarterfinal; March 26; Campus sites
4	Harvard	61
3	Wisconsin	64*

=== Semifinals and championship ===
Semifinals; March 30; Charles Koch Arena
1	BYU	70
2	Kansas	67
3	Wisconsin	50
4	Columbia	67

Final; April 1 Charles Koch Arena
1	BYU	64
4	Columbia	81

== See also ==
- 2026 NCAA Division I women's basketball tournament
- 2026 Women's National Invitation Tournament
