= 2025–26 Georgetown Hoyas women's basketball team =

American college basketball season

2025–26 Georgetown Hoyas women's basketball
- Conference: Big East Conference
- Record: 14–17 (6–14 Big East)
- Head coach: Darnell Haney (3rd season)
- Assistant coaches: Kelly Mazzante; Mariya Moore; Eric Lindsey
- Home arena: McDonough Arena

2025–26 Big East women's basketball standings
	Conf.				Overall
Team	W		L	PCT	W		L	PCT
No. 3 UConn †	20	–	0	1.000	38	–	1	.974
Villanova	16	–	4	.800	25	–	8	.758
Seton Hall	12	–	8	.600	19	–	13	.594
Marquette	12	–	8	.600	18	–	12	.600
Creighton	11	–	9	.550	16	–	15	.516
St. John's	11	–	9	.550	22	–	12	.647
Providence	7	–	13	.350	15	–	18	.455
Butler	6	–	14	.300	12	–	19	.387
Georgetown	6	–	14	.300	14	–	17	.452
DePaul	5	–	15	.250	8	–	24	.250
Xavier	4	–	16	.200	11	–	19	.367
† 2026 Big East tournament winner Rankings from AP poll

The 2025–26 Georgetown Hoyas women's basketball team represent Georgetown University during the 2025–26 NCAA Division I women's basketball season. The Hoyas, led by third-year head coach Darnell Haney, play their home games at McDonough Arena and CareFirst Arena in Washington, D.C. as a member of the Big East Conference.

== Offseason ==
=== Departures ===
Georgetown Departures
Name	Num	Pos.	Height	Year	Hometown	Reason for Departure
Jaeda Wilson	0	G	5'8"	Freshman	Potomac, Maryland	Transferred to George Washington
Kelsey Ransom	1	G	5'10"	Graduate Student	South River, New Jersey	Graduated
Jayden McBride	2	G	5'10"	Freshman	Erie, Pennsylvania	Transferred to Appalachian State
Chetanna Nweke	4	G	6'0"	Graduate Student	Woodbine, Maryland	Graduated
Ariel Jenkins	21	C	6'3"	Senior	Piscataway, New Jersey	Graduated
Kaliyah Myricks	25	F	6'2"	Senior	Hammonton, New Jersey	Graduated
Siobhan Ryan	32	G	6'0"	Graduate Student	Buffalo, New York	Graduated

=== Incoming transfers ===
Georgetown incoming transfers
Name	Num	Pos.	Height	Year	Hometown	Previous School
Laila Jewett	0	G	5'10"	Graduate student	Woodbridge, VA	Central Florida
Destini Agubata	4	G	5'11"	Sophomore	Moreno Valley, CA	West Virginia
Khia Miller	11	G	5'10"	Junior	Woodbridge, VA	East Carolina
Indya Davis	22	G	5'10"	Sophomore	Detroit, Michigan	Georgia
Summer Davis	23	G	5'10"	Sophomore	Detroit, Michigan	Georgia
Cristen Carter	24	F	6'4"	Junior	Indianapolis, Indiana	Butler
Chetanna Nweke	25	F	6'0"	Graduate student	Woodbine, Maryland	Princeton
Brianna Byars	32	F	6'0"	Junior	Paris, Kentucky	Cincinnati

==== Recruiting class of 2025 ====
College recruiting
Name	Hometown	School	Height	Weight	Commit date
Braelynn Barnett; F	Aurora, Colorado	Cherry Creek High School	6 ft 1 in (1.85 m)	N/A	
Braelynn Barnett; F	Recruit ratings: No ratings found				
Overall recruit ranking:
Note: In many cases, Scout, Rivals, 247Sports, On3, and ESPN may conflict in their listings of height and weight.; In these cases, the average was taken. ESPN grades are on a 100-point scale.; Sources: "2025 Player Commits". ESPN. Archived from the original on December 10, 2025.

== Roster ==
2025–26 Georgetown Hoyas women's basketball team
Players
Coaches

Pos.	#	Name	Height	Year	Previous school	Hometown
G	0	Laila Jewett	5 ft 10 in (1.78 m)	GS	Bishop Ireton; Central Florida	Woodbridge, VA
G	3	Victoria Rivera	6 ft 0 in (1.83 m)	Sr	Dobie High School	Pasadena, Texas
G	4	Destini Agubata	5 ft 11 in (1.8 m)	So	Santiago; West Virginia	Moreno Valley, CA
G	5	Modesti McConnell	5 ft 7 in (1.7 m)	Sr	Casady School	Edmond, Oklahoma
F	7	Alexia Araujo-Dagba	6 ft 1 in (1.85 m)	So	Escola Santa Emília	Recife-PE, Brazil
G	8	Khadee Hession	5 ft 9 in (1.75 m)	So	St. Thomas Aquinas	Miami, Florida
G	10	Amanda Ajobiewe	5 ft 9 in (1.75 m)	So	Ontario Christian High School	Riverside, California
G	11	Khia Miller	5 ft 10 in (1.78 m)	Jr	Sidwell Friends; East Carolina	Woodbridge, VA
F	15	Brianna Scott	6 ft 4 in (1.93 m)	GS	South Lakes	Reston, Virginia
F	20	Braelynn Barnett	6 ft 1 in (1.85 m)	Fr	Cherry Creek	Aurora, CO
G	22	Indya Davis	5 ft 10 in (1.78 m)	So	West Bloomfield; Georgia	Detroit, MI
G	23	Summer Davis	5 ft 10 in (1.78 m)	So	West Bloomfield; Georgia	Detroit, MI
F	24	Cristen Carter	6 ft 4 in (1.93 m)	Jr	Ben Davis; Butler	Indianapolis, IN
F	25	Chetanna Nweke	6 ft 0 in (1.83 m)	GS	Stone Ridge; Princeton	Woodbine, MD
F	32	Brianna Byars	6 ft 0 in (1.83 m)	Jr	George Rogers Clark; Cincinnati	Paris, KY

Head coach

- Darnell Haney (Florida A&M)

Assistant coach(es)

- Kelly Mazzante (Penn State)
- Mariya Moore (USC)
- Eric Lindsey (Washington Adventist)

Legend

- (C) Team captain
- (S) Suspended
- (I) Ineligible
- (W) Walk-on
- Injured
- Current redshirt

Roster
Last update: December 10, 2025

== Schedule and results ==
Date time, TV	Rank^{#}	Opponent^{#}	Result	Record	High points	High rebounds	High assists	Site (attendance) city, state
Regular season
November 6, 2025*; 7:00 p.m., ESPN+		Stonehill	W 90–45	1–0	18 – Rivera	6 – Tied	5 – Jewett	McDonough Arena (457); Washington, D.C.
November 9, 2025*; 1:00 p.m., B1G+		at Maryland	L 66–85	1–1	18 – Miller	6 – Carter	3 – Jewett	Xfinity Center (6,263); College Park, MD
November 14, 2025*; 7:00 p.m., ESPN+		at George Mason	L 54–61	1–2	13 – Jewett	12 – Carter	4 – Jewett	EagleBank Arena (1,483); Fairfax, VA
November 18, 2025*; 7:00 p.m., ESPN+		Sacred Heart	W 77–44	2–2	12 – S. Davis	9 – Carter	3 – S. Davis	McDonough Arena (327); Washington, D.C.
November 21, 2025*; 7:00 p.m., ESPN+		George Washington	W 70–50	3–2	14 – I. Davis	6 – Tied	2 – Tied	McDonough Arena (521); Washington, D.C.
November 24, 2025*; 7:00 p.m., ESPN+		Elon	W 93–57	4–2	13 – Hession	7 – Tied	4 – Jewett	McDonough Arena (329); Washington, D.C.
November 26, 2025*; 2:00 p.m., ESPN+		Towson	W 94–67	5–2	20 – Rivera	5 – Tied	7 – Jewett	McDonough Arena (325); Washington, D.C.
December 4, 2025; 7:00 p.m., Peacock		Villanova	L 69–76	5–3 (0–1)	12 – Tied	5 – Tied	2 – Jewett	McDonough Arena (383); Washington, D.C.
December 7, 2025*; 2:00 p.m., ACCN		at Wake Forest	W 58–56	6–3	18 – Agabuta	7 – Agubuta	4 – Jewett	LJVM Coliseum (1,040); Winston-Salem, NC
December 13, 2025*; 12:00 p.m., ESPN+		at Delaware State	W 60–46	7–3	15 – Miller	10 – Scott	5 – Byars	McDonough Arena (1,103); Washington, D.C.
December 21, 2025; 1:00 p.m., ESPN+		at Providence	L 61–68	7–4 (0–2)	13 – Tied	6 – Tied	3 – Miller	Alumni Hall (645); Providence, RI
December 28, 2025; 6:00 p.m., truTV		Creighton	W 76–74	8–4 (1–2)	20 – Miller	14 – Agubuta	3 – Byars	McDonough Arena (627); Washington, D.C.
December 31, 2025*; 2:00 p.m., ESPN+		at Seton Hall	L 36–81	8–5 (1–3)	6 – Carter	7 – Carter	2 – Tied	Walsh Gymnasium (744); South Orange, NJ
January 4, 2026*; 2:00 p.m., ESPN+		Xavier	L 51–52	8–6 (1–4)	18 – Miller	10 – Carter	4 – Jewell	McDonough Arena (647); Washington, D.C.
January 7, 2026; 7:00 p.m., ESPN+		at Butler	W 63–46	9–6 (2–4)	17 – Jewell	7 – Agubuta	3 – Tied	Hinkle Fieldhouse (597); Indianapolis, IN
January 10, 2026*; 3:00 p.m., ESPN+		at DePaul	L 77–80	9–7 (2–5)	24 – Agabuta	4 – Carter	5 – Tied	Wintrust Arena (1,353); Chicago, IL
January 13, 2026*; 2:00 p.m., ESPN+		St. John's	W 59–34	10–7 (3–5)	15 – Agabuta	7 – Byars	4 – Agubata	McDonough Arena (321); Washington, D.C.
January 17, 2026; 3:00 p.m., ESPN+		at Marquette	W 63–54	11–7 (4–5)	21 – Miller	10 – Agubuta	5 – Agubata	Al McGuire Center (1,953); Milwaukee, WI
January 22, 2026; 7:30 p.m., truTV		No. 1 UConn	L 46–83	11–8 (4–6)	8 – Scott	9 – Agubata	1 – Tied	CareFirst Arena (3,846); Washington, D.C.
January 25, 2026; 2:00 p.m., ESPN+		at Xavier	W 65–52	12–8 (5–6)	21 – Scott	8 – Scott	3 – Tied	Cintas Center (868); Cincinnati, OH
January 29, 2026; 11:00 a.m., ESPN+		Seton Hall	L 52–58	12–9 (5–7)	12 – Agubata	7 – Hession	4 – Jewett	McDonough Arena (237); Washington, D.C.
February 1, 2026*; 5:00 p.m., ESPN+		Marquette	L 59–67	12–10 (5–8)	20 – Hession	5 – Tied	2 – Tied	McDonough Arena (523); Washington, D.C.
February 4, 2026; 7:00 p.m., ESPN+		at Creighton	L 62–64	12–11 (5–9)	21 – Agubata	8 – Agubata	3 – Jewett	D. J. Sokol Arena (1,090); Omaha, NE
February 7, 2026; 2:00 p.m., ESPN+		at Villanova	L 55–67	12–12 (5–10)	12 – Miller	12 – Byars	3 – Hession	Finneran Pavilion (1,651); Villanova, PA
February 14, 2026*; 2:00 p.m., ESPN+		Providence	L 54–59	12–13 (5–11)	17 – Scott	8 – Scott	3 – Jewett	McDonough Arena (741); Washington, D.C.
February 18, 2026; 2:00 p.m., ESPN+		at St. John's	W 62–60	13–13 (6–11)	22 – Scott	5 – Scott	3 – Tied	Carnesecca Arena (1,044); Queens, NY
February 21, 2026; 2:00 p.m., ESPN+		Butler	L 58–66	13–14 (6–12)	15 – Scott	10 – Scott	2 – Agubata	McDonough Arena (943); Washington, D.C.
February 26, 2026; 2:00 p.m., ESPN+		at No. 1 UConn	L 52–84	13–15 (6–13)	12 – S. Davis	10 – Agubuta	3 – Tied	PeoplesBank Arena (14,088); Hartford, CT
March 1, 2026*; 2:00 p.m., ESPN+		DePaul	L 54–59	13–16 (6–14)	11 – I. Davis	7 – Agubata	4 – Hession	McDonough Arena (411); Washington, D.C.
Big East tournament
March 6, 2026; 10:00 a.m., Peacock	(8)	vs. (9) Butler; First Round	W 62–58	14–16	19 – Jewett	7 – Scott	2 – Tied	Mohegan Sun Arena; Uncasville, CT
March 7, 2026; 12:00 p.m., Peacock	(8)	vs. (1) No. 1 UConn; Quarterfinals	L 39–84	14–17	9 – Jewett	8 – Scott	2 – Carter	Mohegan Sun Arena; Uncasville, Connecticut
*Non-conference game. ^{#}Rankings from AP Poll. (#) Tournament seedings in parentheses. All times are in Eastern.
