= 2025–26 DePaul Blue Demons women's basketball team =

American college basketball season

2025–26 DePaul Blue Demons women's basketball
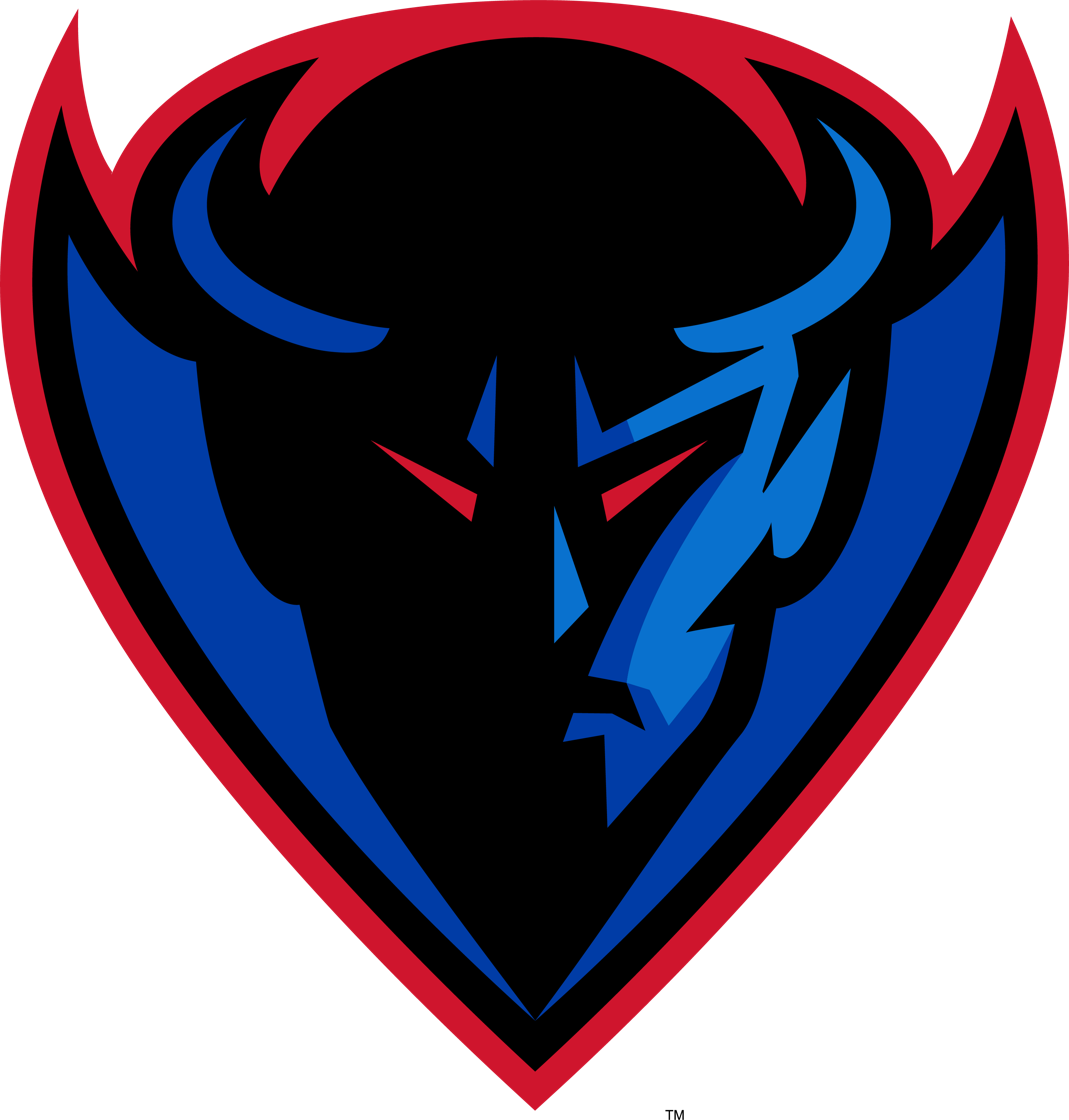
- Conference: Big East Conference
- Record: 8–24 (5–15 Big East)
- Head coach: Jill Pizzotti (1st season)
- Associate head coach: Ty Evans
- Assistant coaches: Ashton Millender; Bradley Bruno; Kathleen Doyle; Jessica January
- Home arena: Wintrust Arena

2025–26 Big East women's basketball standings
	Conf.				Overall
Team	W		L	PCT	W		L	PCT
No. 3 UConn †	20	–	0	1.000	38	–	1	.974
Villanova	16	–	4	.800	25	–	8	.758
Seton Hall	12	–	8	.600	19	–	13	.594
Marquette	12	–	8	.600	18	–	12	.600
Creighton	11	–	9	.550	16	–	15	.516
St. John's	11	–	9	.550	22	–	12	.647
Providence	7	–	13	.350	15	–	18	.455
Butler	6	–	14	.300	12	–	19	.387
Georgetown	6	–	14	.300	14	–	17	.452
DePaul	5	–	15	.250	8	–	24	.250
Xavier	4	–	16	.200	11	–	19	.367
† 2026 Big East tournament winner Rankings from AP poll

The 2025–26 DePaul Blue Demons women's basketball team represented DePaul University during the 2025–26 NCAA Division I women's basketball season. The Blue Demons were led by first year head coach Jill Pizzotti, who replaced retired coach Doug Bruno. The Blue Demons played their home games at the Wintrust Arena as members of the Big East Conference.

== Offseason ==
=== Departures ===
DePaul Departures
Name	Num	Pos.	Height	Year	Hometown	Reason for Departure
Taylor Johnson-Matthews	0	G	5'9"	Senior	Cleveland, OH	Transferred to Clemson
Grace Carstensen	2	G	5'11"	Junior	Hinsdale, IL	Transferred to Florida Atlantic
Charlece Ohiaeri	3	G/F	6'0"	Junior	Las Vegas, NV	Transferred to Saint Mary's
Haley Walker	10	G	5'8"	Junior	Burlington, VT	Transferred to Florida Atlantic
Ellery Minch	12	G/F	6'3"	Sophomore	McCordsville, IN	Transferred to Murray State
Maeve McErlane	13	G	5'10"	Sophomore	Philadelphia, PA	Transferred to Colorado
Angelina Smith	30	G	5'10"	Sophomore	Bolingbrook, IL	Transferred to Oakland
Jorie Allen	33	F	6'1"	Graduate student	Bedford, IN	Graduated
Emory Klatt	35	G	5'10"	Sophomore	Kildeer, IL	Transferred to Kent State

=== Incoming transfers ===
DePaul incoming transfers
Name	Num	Pos.	Height	Year	Hometown	Previous School
Aizhanique Mayo	1	G	5'6"	Junior	Bridgeport, CT	Xavier
Devon Hagemann	7	G	5'6"	Sophomore	Detroit, Michigan	East Carolina
Faith Okorie	22	F	6'0"	RS Sophomore	Chicago, IL	George Mason
Michelle Ojo	23	F	6'0"	Graduate Student	Virginia Beach, VA	Delaware
Kate Novick	33	G	6'0"	Junior	Grodno, Belarus	Morehead State
Justis Odom	35	F	6'2"	Graduate Student	Indianapolis, IN	Lindenwood

==== Recruiting ====
===== Recruiting class of 2025 =====
College recruiting
Name	Hometown	School	Height	Weight	Commit date
Gina Davorija; G	Glenview, IL	Glenbrook South	5 ft 9 in (1.75 m)	N/A	
Gina Davorija; G	Recruit ratings: No ratings found				
Overall recruit ranking:
Note: In many cases, Scout, Rivals, 247Sports, On3, and ESPN may conflict in their listings of height and weight.; In these cases, the average was taken. ESPN grades are on a 100-point scale.; Sources: "2025 Player Commits". ESPN. Archived from the original on October 7, 2025.

== Roster ==
2025–26 DePaul Blue Demons women's basketball team
Players
Coaches

Pos.	#	Name	Height	Year	Previous school	Hometown
G	0	Gina Davorija	5 ft 9 in (1.75 m)	Fr	Glenbrook South	Glenview, IL
G	1	Aizhanique Mayo	5 ft 9 in (1.75 m)	RS Jr	Notre Dame Catholic	Bridgeport, CT
G	5	Alayna West	5 ft 10 in (1.78 m)	RS Fr	Madison La Follette	Madison, WI
G	7	Devon Hagemann	5 ft 6 in (1.68 m)	So	Detroit Edison	Detroit, Michigan
F	9	Meg Newman	6 ft 3 in (1.91 m)	RS Sr	North Central; Alabama	Indianapolis, IN
G	11	Sumer Lee	5 ft 8 in (1.73 m)	Jr	King's Christian	Toronto, ON
G	20	Shakara McCline	5 ft 6 in (1.68 m)	Jr	East St. Louis	East St. Louis, IL
G	21	Natiah Nelson	5 ft 9 in (1.75 m)	So	Africentric Early College	Perrysburg, OH
F	22	Faith Okorie	6 ft 0 in (1.83 m)	RS So	George Mason	Chicago, Illinois
F	23	Michelle Ojo	6 ft 0 in (1.83 m)	GS	Delaware	Virginia Beach, Virginia
G	24	Ally Timm	5 ft 10 in (1.78 m)	RS Fr	Divine Savior Holy Angels	Menomonee Falls, WI
G	25	Kate Clarke	6 ft 1 in (1.85 m)	Sr	Carmel; Michigan	Carmel, IN
G	33	Kate Novick	6 ft 0 in (1.83 m)	Jr	Morehead State	Grodno, Belarus
F	35	Justis Odom	6 ft 2 in (1.88 m)	GS	Lindenwood	Indianapolis, Indiana

Head coach

- Jill Pizzotti (Southeast Missouri State)

Assistant coach(es)

- Ty Evans (UW–Whitewater)
- Ashton Millender (DePaul)
- Bradley Bruno (DePaul)
- Kathleen Doyle (Iowa)
- Jessica January (DePaul)

Legend

- (C) Team captain
- (S) Suspended
- (I) Ineligible
- (W) Walk-on
- Injured
- Current redshirt

Roster

== Schedule and results ==
Date time, TV	Rank^{#}	Opponent^{#}	Result	Record	High points	High rebounds	High assists	Site (attendance) city, state
Exhibition
October 25, 2025*; 7:15 p.m.		Milwaukee	W 77–73	–	14 – West	6 – West	8 – West	Sullivan Athletic Center (462); Chicago, IL
Non-conference regular season
November 4, 2025*; 6:00 p.m., ESPN+		Valparaiso	W 92–54	1–0	28 – Timm	15 – Nelson	6 – Novik	Wintrust Arena (1,050); Chicago, IL
November 9, 2025*; 4:00 p.m.		at UNLV	L 78–85	1–1	20 – Novik	7 – Ojo	5 – Novik	Cox Pavilion (952); Paradise, NV
November 12, 2025*; 5:00 p.m., ESPN+		at Bradley	L 64–78	1–2	15 – Nelson	10 – Novik	5 – West	Renaissance Coliseum; Peoria, IL
November 17, 2025*; 11:00 a.m., ESPN+		Northwestern	L 72–79	1–3	18 – Novik	9 – Novik	5 – Novik	Wintrust Arena (9,526); Chicago, IL
November 21, 2025*; 5:30 p.m., ESPN+		Grambling State; DePaul MTE Semifinal	W 75–39	2–3	17 – Novik	10 – Newman	7 – Hagemann	Wintrust Arena (1,091); Chicago, IL
November 22, 2025*; 5:30 p.m., ESPN+		Northern Colorado; DePaul MTE	L 60–61	2–4	13 – Novik	6 – Nelson	6 – Hagemann	Wintrust Arena (973); Chicago, IL
November 26, 2025*; 11:00 a.m., ESPN+		Loyola Chicago	L 49–61	2–5	9 – Tied	8 – Novik	6 – Novik	Wintrust Arena (1,400); Chicago, IL
November 30, 2025*; 12:00 p.m., ESPN+		at Princeton	L 41–71	2–6	10 – Ojo	8 – Novik	4 – Tied	Jadwin Gymnasium (779); Princeton, NJ
December 4, 2025; 8:00 p.m., Peacock		Marquette	L 54–85	2–7 (0–1)	17 – West	4 – Novik	3 – Tied	Wintrust Arena (1,031); Chicago, IL
December 7, 2025; 12:00 p.m., FS1		at No. 1 UConn	L 35–102	2–8 (0–2)	8 – Tied	6 – Newman	3 – Tied	Harry A. Gampel Pavilion (10,244); Storrs, CT
December 11, 2025*; 6:00 p.m., ESPN+		UMass Lowell	W 78–48	3–8	20 – Ojo	12 – Novik	10 – Novik	Wintrust Arena (839); Chicago, IL
December 14, 2025*; 4:30 p.m., FS1		No. 25 Michigan State	L 46–90	3–9	12 – McCline	8 – Ojo	2 – Tied	Wintrust Arena (2,076); Chicago, IL
December 17, 2025*; 7:00 p.m., Marquee		at UIC	L 67–77	3–10	25 – McCline	7 – Tied	6 – Hagemann	Credit Union 1 Arena (1,274); Chicago, IL
December 20, 2025; 1:00 p.m., ESPN+		at Creighton	L 50–70	3–11 (0–3)	11 – Novik	9 – Novik	3 – Tied	D. J. Sokol Arena (984); Omaha, NE
December 29, 2025; 6:00 p.m., ESPN+		Villanova	L 48–81	3–12 (0–4)	14 – Novik	6 – Novik	3 – West	Wintrust Arena (1,420); Chicago, IL
January 1, 2026; 8:00 p.m., ESPN+		at St. John's	L 58–75	3–13 (0–5)	14 – West	6 – Tied	4 – Hagemann	Carnesecca Arena (680); Queens, NY
January 4, 2026; 2:00 p.m., ESPN+		Providence	L 59–69	3–14 (0–6)	13 – Davorija	10 – Newman	3 – Newman	Wintrust Arena (1,580); Chicago, IL
January 10, 2026; 2:00 p.m., ESPN+		Georgetown	W 80–77	4–14 (1–6)	19 – Novik	8 – Newman	10 – Novik	Wintrust Arena (1,353); Chicago, IL
January 13, 2026; 5:30 p.m., ESPN+		at Xavier	L 61–71	4–15 (1–7)	12 – Tied	8 – Newman	4 – Tied	Cintas Center (943); Cincinnati, OH
January 17, 2026*; 2:00 p.m., ESPN+		Seton Hall	L 77–86	4–16 (1–8)	17 – Ojo	5 – Nelson	5 – Ojo	Wintrust Arena (1,790); Chicago, IL
January 21, 2026; 6:00 p.m., ESPN+		at Butler	L 67–73	4–17 (1–9)	12 – Tied	7 – Novik	5 – Newman	Hinkle Fieldhouse (845); Indianapolis, IN
January 25, 2026; 8:00 p.m., ESPN+		Creighton	W 76–61	5–17 (2–9)	17 – Novik	10 – Tied	5 – Tied	Wintrust Arena (1,675); Chicago, IL
January 28, 2026; 8:00 p.m., ESPN+		at Marquette	L 73–74	5–18 (2–10)	21 – Timm	6 – Tied	5 – Hagemann	Al McGuire Center (1,252); Milwaukee, WI
January 31, 2026; 8:00 p.m., ESPN+		at Villanova	L 56–69	5–19 (2–11)	14 – Hagemann	8 – Ojo	5 – Novik	Finneran Pavilion (2,015); Villanova, PA
February 4, 2026*; 7:00 p.m., TruTV		No. 1 UConn	L 40–86	5–20 (2–12)	10 – Tied	9 – Novik	5 – Novik	Wintrust Arena (6,277); Chicago, IL
February 10, 2026*; 6:00 p.m., ESPN+		St. John's	W 72–68	6–20 (3–12)	20 – Novik	11 – Novik	5 – Hagemann	Wintrust Arena (1,007); Chicago, IL
February 14, 2026; 12:00 p.m., ESPN+		at Seton Hall	L 74–96	6–21 (3–13)	21 – Nelson	8 – Newman	5 – Hagemann	Walsh Gymnasium (949); South Orange, NJ
February 18, 2026*; 6:00 p.m., ESPN+		at Providence	L 60–66	6–22 (3–14)	23 – Novik	8 – Nelson	7 – Hagemann	Alumni Hall (795); Providence, RI
February 22, 2026; 2:00 p.m., ESPN+		Xavier	W 76–67	7–22 (4–14)	16 – Novik	9 – Novik	5 – West	Wintrust Arena (3,071); Chicago, IL
February 25, 2026; 6:00 p.m., ESPN+		Butler	L 64–71	7–23 (4–15)	13 – Ojo	5 – Ojo	4 – Nelson	Wintrust Arena (1,417); Chicago, IL
March 1, 2026; 1:00 p.m., ESPN+		at Georgetown	W 59–54	8–23 (5–15)	20 – Timm	10 – Novick	4 – West	McDonough Arena (411); Washington, D.C.
Big East Women's Tournament
March 6, 2026; 12:30 p.m.		vs. Providence	L 55–69	8–24 (5–16)	13 – Novik	6 – Newman	3 – Tied	Mohegan Sun Arena; Uncasville, CT
*Non-conference game. ^{#}Rankings from AP Poll. (#) Tournament seedings in parentheses. All times are in Central Time.

== See also ==
- 2025–26 DePaul Blue Demons men's basketball team
