= 2025–26 Butler Bulldogs women's basketball team =

American college basketball season

2025–26 Butler Bulldogs women's basketball
- Conference: Big East Conference
- Record: 12–19 (6–14 Big East)
- Head coach: Austin Parkinson (4th season)
- Assistant coaches: Latrell Flemming; Kristin Wodrich; Holly Hoopingarner; Nevena Markovic
- Home arena: Hinkle Fieldhouse

2025–26 Big East women's basketball standings
	Conf.				Overall
Team	W		L	PCT	W		L	PCT
No. 3 UConn †	20	–	0	1.000	38	–	1	.974
Villanova	16	–	4	.800	25	–	8	.758
Seton Hall	12	–	8	.600	19	–	13	.594
Marquette	12	–	8	.600	18	–	12	.600
Creighton	11	–	9	.550	16	–	15	.516
St. John's	11	–	9	.550	22	–	12	.647
Providence	7	–	13	.350	15	–	18	.455
Butler	6	–	14	.300	12	–	19	.387
Georgetown	6	–	14	.300	14	–	17	.452
DePaul	5	–	15	.250	8	–	24	.250
Xavier	4	–	16	.200	11	–	19	.367
† 2026 Big East tournament winner Rankings from AP poll

The 2025–26 Butler Bulldogs women's basketball team represented Butler University in the 2025–26 NCAA Division I women's basketball season. The Bulldogs, led by fourth year head coach Austin Parkinson, played their home games at Hinkle Fieldhouse and are members of the Big East Conference.

== Offseason ==
=== Departures ===
Name	Number	Pos.	Height	Year	Hometown	Reason for departure
Karsyn Norman	1	G	5'6"	Junior	Bedford, IN	Transferred to Ball State
Riley Makalusky	2	G/F	6'2"	Junior	Fishers, IN	Transferred to West Virginia
Ari Wiggins	3	G	5'8"	Senior	Indianapolis, IN	Graduated
Kilyn McGuff	11	G/F	6'0"	Senior	Columbus, OH	Graduated
Lily Carmody	12	G	5'11"	Sophomore	Melbourne, Australia	Transferred to Boston College
Jocelyn Land	14	G/F	6'0"	Sophomore	Chanhassen, MN	Transferred to Montana
Caroline Strande	21	G	5'11"	GS Senior	Racine, WI	Graduated
Jordan Meulemans	23	G	6'0"	RS Junior	De Pere, WI	Transferred to Marquette
Cristen Carter	24	F	6'4"	Senior	Indianapolis, IN	Transferred to Georgetown
Sydney James	32	F	6'3"	Senior	Brownstown, IN	Graduated

=== Incoming transfers ===
Name	Number	Pos.	Height	Year	Hometown	Previous school
Gabby Wilke	1	F	6'2"	Sophomore	Beaver Dam, WI	South Dakota
Kennedy Langham	4	G	5'7"	Junior	Harvest, AL	Samford
McKenna Johnson	7	G	5'9"	Sophomore	Wilmot, WI	Minnesota
Nevaeh Jackson	11	G	6'0"	Junior	Fort Wayne, IN	Valparaiso
Saniya Jackson	12	G	6'0"	RS Sophomore	Fort Wayne, IN	Valparaiso
Caroline Dotsey	15	F	6'2"	Junior	Havertown, PA	Maine
Mallory Miller	24	F	6'4"	Sophomore	Aberdeen, SD	Arizona State

==== Recruiting class of 2025 ====
College recruiting
Name	Hometown	School	Height	Weight	Commit date
Anna Wypych; G	Rockford, MI	Rockford	6 ft 0 in (1.83 m)	N/A	
Anna Wypych; G	Recruit ratings: No ratings found				
Addison Baxter; G	Larwill, IN	Columbia City	5 ft 9 in (1.75 m)	N/A	
Addison Baxter; G	Recruit ratings: No ratings found				
Overall recruit ranking:
Note: In many cases, Scout, Rivals, 247Sports, On3, and ESPN may conflict in their listings of height and weight.; In these cases, the average was taken. ESPN grades are on a 100-point scale.; Sources: "2025 Player Commits". ESPN. Archived from the original on October 7, 2025.

== Roster ==
2025–26 Butler Bulldogs women's basketball team
Players
Coaches

Pos.	#	Name	Height	Year	Previous school	Hometown
F	1	Gabby Wilke	6 ft 2 in (1.88 m)	So	South Dakota	Beaver Dam, WI
G	2	Anna Wypych	6 ft 2 in (1.88 m)	Fr	Rockford	Rockford, MI
G	4	Kennedy Langham	5 ft 7 in (1.7 m)	Jr	Samford	Harvest, AL
F	5	McKenzie Swanson	6 ft 3 in (1.91 m)	RS Fr	Birmingham Marian	Rochester, MI
G	7	McKenna Johnson	5 ft 9 in (1.75 m)	So	Minnesota	Wilmot, WI
G	10	Lily Zeinstra	5 ft 11 in (1.8 m)	Fr	Byron Center	Byron Center, MI
G	11	Nevaeh Jackson	6 ft 0 in (1.83 m)	Jr	Valparaiso	Fort Wayne, IN
G	12	Saniya Jackson	6 ft 0 in (1.83 m)	RS So	Valparaiso	Fort Wayne, IN
F	24	Mallory Miller	6 ft 4 in (1.93 m)	RS So	Arizona State	Aberdeen, SD
F	25	Caroline Dotsey	6 ft 2 in (1.88 m)	Jr	Maine	Havertown, PA
F	31	Lilly Stoddard	6 ft 4 in (1.93 m)	So	Crown Point; Purdue	Crown Point, IN
G	33	Addison Baxter	5 ft 9 in (1.75 m)	Fr	Columbia City	Larwill, IN

Head coach

- Austin Parkinson (Purdue)

Assistant coach(es)

- Latrell Fleming (Wisconsin)
- Kristin Wodrich (Texas Tech)
- Holly Hoopingarner (IUPUI)
- Chelsey Perry (UT Martin)

Legend

- (C) Team captain
- (S) Suspended
- (I) Ineligible
- (W) Walk-on
- Injured
- Current redshirt

Roster

== Schedule and results ==
Date time, TV	Rank^{#}	Opponent^{#}	Result	Record	High points	High rebounds	High assists	Site (attendance) city, state
Exhibition
October 28, 2025*; 7:00 p.m.		Taylor	W 95–63		–	–	–	Hinkle Fieldhouse; Indianapolis, IN
Regular season
November 3, 2025*; 11:00 a.m., ESPN+		Wright State	W 74–53	1–0	14 – Zeinstra	6 – Tied	8 – Baxter	Hinkle Fieldhouse (1,867); Indianapolis, IN
November 7, 2025*; 6:00 p.m., ESPN+		Columbia	L 69–74	1–1	14 – N. Jackson	7 – Tied	3 – Tied	Hinkle Fieldhouse (893); Indianapolis, IN
November 12, 2025*; 7:00 p.m., ESPN+		Central Michigan	L 59–68	1–2	16 – Zeinstra	4 – Tied	5 – Langham	Hinkle Fieldhouse (783); Indianapolis, IN
November 16, 2025*; 5:00 p.m., ESPN+		Northern Kentucky	W 73–56	2–2	14 – Zeinstra	8 – Miller	4 – Tied	Hinkle Fieldhouse (1,111); Indianapolis, IN
November 19, 2025*; 7:00 p.m., B1G+		at Indiana	L 53–72	2–3	13 – N. Jackson	5 – Tied	2 – Tied	Simon Skjodt Assembly Hall (7,716); Bloomington, IN
November 23, 2025*; 2:00 p.m., ESPN+		Milwaukee	W 67–53	3–3	13 – Zeinstra	6 – Dotsey	4 – Langham	Hinkle Fieldhouse (811); Indianapolis, IN
November 28, 2025*; 5:00 p.m., Ion		vs. Dayton; Fort Myers Tip-Off	W 92–66	4–3	19 – Zeinstra	7 – Stoddard	6 – Tied	Suncoast Credit Union Arena (927); Fort Myers, FL
November 29, 2025*; 5:00 p.m., Ion		vs. Georgia; Fort Myers Tip-Off	L 54–80	4–4	12 – Tied	5 – Dotsey	2 – Tied	Suncoast Credit Union Arena (932); Fort Myers, FL
December 4, 2025; 1:00 p.m., ESPN+		at Seton Hall	L 51–70	4–5 (0–1)	12 – S. Jackson	5 – Tied	2 – Tied	Walsh Gymnasium (629); South Orange, NJ
December 7, 2025*; 4:00 p.m., ESPN+		at Marquette	L 55–80	4–6 (0–2)	15 – Dotsey	8 – Dotsey	6 – Zeinstra	Al McGuire Center (1,304); Milwaukee, WI
December 11, 2025*; 7:00 p.m., ESPN+		Indiana State	W 101–56	5–6 (0–2)	16 – Miller	7 – Miller	6 – Wypych	Hinkle Fieldhouse (754); Indianapolis, IN
December 14, 2025*; 2:00 p.m., ESPN+		Eastern Illinois	W 74–52	6–6	12 – Wypych	9 – Dotsey	6 – Miller	Hinkle Fieldhouse; Indianapolis, IN
December 19, 2025; 7:00 p.m., ESPN+		Xavier	W 64–58	7–6 (1–2)	25 – Dotsey	8 – Dotsey	3 – Tied	Hinkle Fieldhouse (888); Indianapolis, IN
December 28, 2025; 4:00 p.m., TNT/TruTV		No. 1 UConn	L 47–94	7–7 (1–3)	10 – Tied	9 – Dotsey	4 – Baxter	Hinkle Fieldhouse (5,626); Indianapolis, IN
January 4, 2026; 2:00 p.m., ESPN+		at Creighton	L 59–67	7–8 (1–4)	17 – S. Jackson	7 – Tied	4 – Zeinstra	D. J. Sokol Arena (1,003); Omaha, NE
January 7, 2026; 7:00 p.m., ESPN+		Georgetown	L 46–63	7–9 (1–5)	11 – Johnson	5 – Miller	2 – Johnson	Hinkle Fieldhouse (597); Indianapolis, IN
January 10, 2026; 2:00 p.m., ESPN+		at St. John's	L 39–49	7–10 (1–6)	10 – Dotsey	6 – Tied	3 – Zeinstra	Carnesecca Arena (903); Queens, NY
January 14, 2026; 7:00 p.m., ESPN+		Providence	W 62–52	8–10 (2–6)	13 – Tied	10 – Dotsey	5 – Baxter	Hinkle Fieldhouse (777); Indianapolis, IN
January 18, 2026; 2:00 p.m., ESPN+		at Villanova	L 65–73	8–11 (2–7)	25 – Miller	5 – Tied	5 – Miller	Finneran Pavilion (1,741); Villanova, PA
January 21, 2026; 7:00 p.m., ESPN+		DePaul	W 73–67	9–11 (3–7)	22 – S. Jackson	10 – S. Jackson	4 – Tied	Hinkle Fieldhouse (845); Indianapolis, IN
January 25, 2026; 2:00 p.m., ESPN+		Marquette	L 60–64	9–12 (3–8)	14 – Miller	9 – S. Jackson	4 – Baxter	Hinkle Fieldhouse (439); Indianapolis, IN
February 1, 2026; 1:00 p.m., ESPN+		at Xavier	L 59–63	9–13 (3–9)	14 – Dotsey	5 – S. Jackson	4 – Baxter	Cintas Center (990); Cincinnati, OH
February 4, 2026; 7:00 p.m., ESPN+		Villanova	L 57–67	9–14 (3–10)	16 – Johnson	6 – Tied	4 – S. Jackson	Hinkle Fieldhouse (1,176); Indianapolis, IN
February 7, 2026; 12:00 p.m., FS1		at No. 1 UConn	L 48–80	9–15 (3–11)	13 – Dotsey	12 – S. Jackson	4 – Wypych	PeoplesBank Arena (13,811); Hartford, CT
February 11, 2026; 2:00 p.m., ESPN+		at Providence	L 64–73	9–16 (3–12)	12 – Langham	6 – Jackson	4 – Miller	Alumni Hall (678); Providence, RI
February 14, 2026; 2:00 p.m., ESPN+		St. John's	L 47–58	9–17 (3–13)	9 – Dotsey	7 – Jackson	3 – Langham	Hinkle Fieldhouse (1,876); Indianapolis, IN
February 18, 2026; 7:00 p.m., ESPN+		Creighton	L 58–67	9–18 (3–14)	18 – Johnson	5 – Jackson	4 – Miller	Hinkle Fieldhouse (1,210); Indianapolis, IN
February 21, 2026; 2:00 p.m., ESPN+		at Georgetown	W 66–58	10–18 (4–14)	13 – Wypych	10 – S. Jackson	4 – N. Jackson	McDonough Arena (943); Washington, D.C.
February 25, 2026; 7:00 p.m., ESPN+		at DePaul	W 71–64	10–18 (5–14)	21 – Wypych	14 – Jackson	8 – Miller	Wintrust Arena (1,417); Chicago, IL
March 1, 2026; 3:30 p.m., Peacock		Seton Hall	W 62–55	12-18 (6–14)	19 – Miller	8 – Jackson	5 – Langham	Hinkle Fieldhouse (1,678); Indianapolis, IN
Big East Women's Tournament
March 6, 2026; 10 a.m., Peacock	(9)	vs. (8) Georgetown; First Round	L 58–62	12–19	18 – Wypych	7 – S. Jackson	6 – S. Jackson	Mohegan Sun Arena; Uncasville, CT
*Non-conference game. ^{#}Rankings from AP Poll. (#) Tournament seedings in parentheses. All times are in EST.

== See also ==
- 2025–26 Butler Bulldogs men's basketball team
