= 2026 Big East women's basketball tournament =

- Classification: Division I
- Season: 2025–26
- Teams: 11
- Site: Mohegan Sun Arena; Uncasville, Connecticut
- Champions: UConn (24th title)
- Winning coach: Geno Auriemma
- MVP: Sarah Strong (UConn)
- Television: Peacock/NBCSN

2025–26 Big East women's basketball standings
	Conf.				Overall
Team	W		L	PCT	W		L	PCT
No. 1 UConn †	20	–	0	1.000	35	–	0	1.000
Villanova	16	–	4	.800	25	–	8	.758
Seton Hall	12	–	8	.600	19	–	13	.594
Marquette	12	–	8	.600	18	–	12	.600
Creighton	11	–	9	.550	16	–	15	.516
St. John's	11	–	9	.550	22	–	12	.647
Providence	7	–	13	.350	15	–	18	.455
Butler	6	–	14	.300	12	–	19	.387
Georgetown	6	–	14	.300	14	–	17	.452
DePaul	5	–	15	.250	8	–	24	.250
Xavier	4	–	16	.200	11	–	19	.367
† 2026 Big East tournament winner As of March 21, 2026; Rankings from AP poll

The 2026 Big East women's basketball tournament was the postseason women's basketball tournament for the Big East Conference, which was held from March 6–9, 2026 at the Mohegan Sun Arena in Uncasville, Connecticut. The winner receive an automatic bid to the 2026 NCAA tournament.

Undefeated UConn defeated Villanova 90–51 in the championship game, earning the Huskies their 24th Big East and 13th consecutive conference title, sending them to the NCAA tournament for the 37th straight year.

== Seeds ==
All 11 Big East schools participated in the tournament. Teams were seeded by the conference record with tie-breaking procedures to determine the seeds for teams with identical conference records. The top five teams received first-round byes. Seeding for the tournament was determined at the close of the conference regular season.

Seed	School	BE Record	Tiebreaker
1	UConn #‡	20–0	
2	Villanova ‡	16–4	
3	Seton Hall ‡	12–8	2–0 vs. Marquette
4	Marquette ‡	12–8	0–2 vs. Seton Hall
5	Creighton ‡	11–9	2–0 vs. St. John's
6	St. John's	11–9	0–2 vs. Creighton
7	Providence	7–13	
8	Butler	6–14	1–1 vs. Seton Hall
9	Georgetown	6–14	0–2 vs. Seton Hall
10	DePaul	5–15	
11	Xavier	4–16	
# – Big East regular season champions, and tournament No. 1 seed. ‡ – Received a bye in the conference tournament. Overall records include all games played in the Big East Tournament.

== Schedule ==
Game	Time	Matchup	Score	Television
First round – Friday, March 6
1	11:00 a.m.	No. 8 Georgetown vs. No. 9 Butler	62–58	Peacock/NBCSN
2	1:30 p.m.	No. 7 Providence vs. No. 10 DePaul	69–55	Peacock/NBCSN
3	4:00 p.m.	No. 6 St. John's vs. No. 11 Xavier	53–48	Peacock/NBCSN
Quarterfinals – Saturday, March 7
4	12:00 p.m.	No. 1 UConn vs. No. 8 Georgetown	84–39	Peacock/NBCSN
5	2:30 p.m.	No. 4 Marquette vs. No. 5 Creighton	44–57	Peacock/NBCSN
6	7:00 p.m.	No. 2 Villanova vs. No. 7 Providence	73–65	Peacock/NBCSN
7	9:30 p.m.	No. 3 Seton Hall vs. No. 6 St. John's	63–61	Peacock/NBCSN
Semifinals – Sunday, March 8
8	2:30 p.m.	No. 1 UConn vs. No. 5 Creighton	100–51	Peacock/NBCSN
9	5:00 p.m.	No. 2 Villanova vs. No. 3 Seton Hall	62–48	Peacock/NBCSN
Championship – Monday, March 9
10	7:00 p.m.	No. 1 UConn vs. No. 2 Villanova	90–51	Peacock/NBCSN
Game times in EST for the first round and quarterfinals and EDT for the semifinals and championship. Rankings denote tournament seed.

== Bracket ==
First round Friday, March 6 Peacock/NBCSN
8	Georgetown	62
9	Butler	58
7	Providence	69
10	DePaul	55
6	St. John's	53
11	Xavier	48

Quarterfinals; Saturday, March 7 Peacock/NBCSN
1	1 UConn	84
8	Georgetown	39
4	Marquette	44
5	Creighton	57
2	Villanova	73
7	Providence	65
3	Seton Hall	63
6	St. John's	61

Semifinals; Sunday, March 8 Peacock/NBCSN
1	1 UConn	100
5	Creighton	51
2	Villanova	62
3	Seton Hall	48

Championship; Monday, March 9 Peacock/NBCSN
1	1 UConn	90
2	Villanova	51
