= 2012–13 Drexel Dragons women's basketball team =

American college basketball season

2012–13 Drexel Dragons women's basketball

WNIT Champions
- Conference: Colonial Athletic Association

Ranking
- Coaches: No. RV
- Record: 28–10 (13–5 CAA)
- Head coach: Denise Dillon (10th season)
- Assistant coaches: Amy Mallon; Melissa Dunne; Stacy Weiss
- Home arena: Daskalakis Athletic Center

2012–13 CAA women's basketball standings
	Conf.				Overall
Team	W		L	PCT	W		L	PCT
No. 15 Delaware†	18	–	0	1.000	32	–	4	.889
James Madison	15	–	3	.833	25	–	11	.694
Drexel	13	–	5	.722	28	–	10	.737
Northeastern	10	–	8	.556	17	–	13	.567
Old Dominion	10	–	8	.556	19	–	12	.613
Hofstra	9	–	9	.500	14	–	17	.452
Towson	6	–	12	.333	12	–	18	.400
William & Mary	6	–	12	.333	8	–	22	.267
Georgia State	5	–	13	.278	13	–	16	.448
George Mason	4	–	14	.222	9	–	21	.300
UNC Wilmington	3	–	15	.167	5	–	26	.161
† 2013 CAA tournament winner Rankings from AP poll

The 2012–13 Drexel Dragons women's basketball team represented Drexel University during the 2012–13 NCAA Division I women's basketball season. The Dragons, led by tenth year head coach Denise Dillon, played their home games at the Daskalakis Athletic Center and were members of the Colonial Athletic Association (CAA). They finished the season 28–10, 13–5 in CAA play to finish in 3rd place. They advanced to the championship game of the CAA women's tournament where they were defeated by Delaware. They received an invitation to the Women's National Invitational Tournament where they won the championship, defeating Utah in the finals.

== Off season ==
=== 2012 Recruiting Class ===
College recruiting information
Name	Hometown	School	Height	Weight	Commit date
Rachel Pearson; W	West Chester, PA	Archbishop Carroll HS	5 ft 11 in (1.80 m)	N/A	Jan 12, 2012
Rachel Pearson; W	Recruit ratings: ESPN: (90)				
Meghan Creighton; PG	West Chester, PA	Archbishop Carroll HS	5 ft 7 in (1.70 m)	N/A	
Meghan Creighton; PG	Recruit ratings: ESPN: (90)				
Pandora Wilson; F	Gaithersburg, MD	Academy of the Holy Cross	6 ft 1 in (1.85 m)	N/A	
Pandora Wilson; F	Recruit ratings: ESPN: (84)				
Carrie Alexander; G	Bowie, MD	Bishop McNamara HS	5 ft 8 in (1.73 m)	N/A	
Carrie Alexander; G	Recruit ratings: ESPN: (83)				
Overall recruit ranking:
Note: In many cases, Scout, Rivals, 247Sports, On3, and ESPN may conflict in their listings of height and weight.; In these cases, the average was taken. ESPN grades are on a 100-point scale.; Sources: "Drexel Dragons". ESPN.; "2012 Team Ranking". Rivals.

== Roster ==
2012–13 Drexel Dragons women's basketball team
Players
Coaches

Pos.	#	Name	Height	Year	Previous school	Hometown
F	1	Nicki Jones	6 ft 2 in (1.88 m)	Sr	Nazareth Academy (NY)	Rochester, NY
G/F	2	Abby Redick	6 ft 1 in (1.85 m)	RS Jr	Hidden Valley HS (VA)	Roanoke, VA
G	4	Renee Johnson-Allen	5 ft 6 in (1.68 m)	Sr	Barking Abbey	London, England
F	10	Tory Thierolf	6 ft 0 in (1.83 m)	Jr	Germantown Academy	Doylestown, PA
G	11	Hollie Mershon	5 ft 10 in (1.78 m)	Sr	Archbishop Carroll HS	Malvern, PA
F	13	Pandora Wilson	6 ft 0 in (1.83 m)	Fr	Academy of the Holy Cross	Gaithersburg, MD
G	15	Carrie Alexander	5 ft 7 in (1.7 m)	Fr	Bishop McNamara HS	Bowie, MD
F	20	Taylor Wootton	6 ft 1 in (1.85 m)	Sr	Rutherford HS (NJ)	Rutherford, NJ
G	22	Meghan Creighton	5 ft 7 in (1.7 m)	Fr	Archbishop Carroll HS	West Chester, PA
G	24	Rachel Pearson	5 ft 11 in (1.8 m)	Fr	Archbishop Carroll HS	West Chester, PA
G/F	33	Fiona Flanagan	5 ft 10 in (1.78 m)	Jr	Notre Dame de Namur	Penn Valley, PA
F	41	Jamila Thompson	6 ft 4 in (1.93 m)	Jr	Barking Abbey	London, England
F	42	Jackie Schluth	6 ft 1 in (1.85 m)	So	Bishop Eustace	Medford, NJ

Head coach

- Denise Dillon (Villanova)

Assistant coach(es)

- Amy Mallon (Saint Joseph's)
- Melissa Dunne (Temple)
- Stacy Weiss (Drexel)

Legend

- (C) Team captain
- (S) Suspended
- (I) Ineligible
- (W) Walk-on
- Injured
- Current redshirt

Roster
Last update: March 15, 2019

== Schedule ==
Date time, TV	Rank^{#}	Opponent^{#}	Result	Record	High points	High rebounds	High assists	Site (attendance) city, state
Exhibition
October 28, 2012*; 12:00 pm		Bloomsburg	W 67–43		–	–	–	Daskalakis Athletic Center; Philadelphia, PA
Non-conference regular season
November 9, 2012*; 7:00 pm		Providence	W 60–50	1–0	24 – Mershon	9 – Mershon	5 – Mershon	Alumni Hall (633); Providence, RI
November 14, 2012*; 7:00 pm		Saint Joseph's	L 45–47	1–1	19 – Mershon	10 – Jones	4 – Flanagan	Daskalakis Athletic Center (1,003); Philadelphia, PA
November 17, 2012*; 1:00 pm		at La Salle	W 56–53	2–1	20 – Mershon	10 – Jones	4 – Tied	Tom Gola Arena (452); Philadelphia, PA
November 23, 2012*; 4:00 pm		vs. UMKC; LIU Turkey Classic Quarterfinals	W 76–40	3–1	19 – Pearson	7 – Mershon	5 – Tied	Wellness Center (101); Brooklyn, NY
November 24, 2012*; 4:00 pm		vs. Colgate; LIU Turkey Classic Semifinals	W 51–33	4–1	18 – Mershon	12 – Wootton	3 – Mershon	Wellness Center (89); Brooklyn, NY
November 28, 2012*; 7:00 pm		at South Carolina; LIU Turkey Classic Championship	L 55–58 ^{OT}	4–2	19 – Mershon	15 – Mershon	3 – Redick	Colonial Life Arena (2,675); Columbia, SC
November 30, 2012*; 5:00 pm		vs. Rhode Island; TD Bank Classic	W 55–43	5–2	16 – Wootton	5 – Johnson-Allen	3 – Tied	Patrick Gym (826); Burlington, VT
December 1, 2012*; 4:15 pm		at Vermont; TD Bank Classic	W 66–49	6–2	20 – Jones	9 – Tied	6 – Tied	Patrick Gym (941); Burlington, VT
December 21, 2012*; 1:00 pm		Penn; Battle of 33rd Street	W 77–50	7–2	23 – Mershon	14 – Mershon	6 – Flanagan	Daskalakis Athletic Center (803); Philadelphia, PA
December 28, 2012*; 4:00 pm		American	L 52–58	7–3	22 – Mershon	12 – Mershon	4 – Mershon	Daskalakis Athletic Center (726); Philadelphia, PA
December 31, 2012*; 2:00 pm		at Princeton	L 59–74	7–4	14 – Mershon	6 – Flanagan	7 – Mershon	Jadwin Gymnasium (1,231); Princeton, NJ
CAA regular season
January 6, 2013; 2:00 pm		Towson	W 76–55	8–4 (1–0)	20 – Mershon	6 – Flanagan	6 – Creighton	Daskalakis Athletic Center (621); Philadelphia, PA
January 10, 2012; 7:00 pm		at James Madison	W 48–46	9–4 (2–0)	20 – Mershon	11 – Johnson-Allen	3 – Flanagan	JMU Convocation Center (1,869); Harrisonburg, VA
January 13, 2013; 1:00 pm		at UNC Wilmington	W 64–51	10–4 (3–0)	26 – Mershon	8 – Flanagan	6 – Johnson-Allen	Trask Coliseum (682); Wilmington, NC
January 17, 2013; 7:00 pm		Hofstra	W 59–53	11–4 (4–0)	24 – Wootton	7 – Johnson-Allen	5 – Jones	Daskalakis Athletic Center (1,011); Philadelphia, PA
January 20, 2013; 2:00 pm		at William & Mary	W 58–46	12–4 (5–0)	22 – Wootton	8 – Mershon	5 – Mershon	Kaplan Arena (485); Williamsburg, VA
January 24, 2013; 7:00 pm		at Northeastern	W 85–73	13–4 (6–0)	33 – Mershon	8 – Mershon	7 – 3 tied	Cabot Center (302); Boston, MA
January 27, 2013; 2:00 pm		Delaware	L 56–65	13–5 (6–1)	17 – Mershon	6 – Mershon	7 – Mershon	Daskalakis Athletic Center (2,532); Philadelphia, PA
January 31, 2013; 7:00 pm		at Old Dominion	L 50–53	13–6 (6–2)	22 – Mershon	8 – Wootton	6 – Flanagan	Constant Center (2,059); Norfolk, VA
February 3, 2013; 2:00 pm		Georgia State	W 79–55	14–6 (7–2)	25 – Mershon	8 – Johnson-Allen	5 – Tied	Daskalakis Athletic Center (903); Philadelphia, PA
February 5, 2013; 7:00 pm		at Towson	W 62–48	15–6 (8–2)	19 – Mershon	5 – Johnson-Allen	6 – Mershon	Towson Center (248); Towson, MD
February 10, 2013; 4:30 pm		Old Dominion	W 64–50	16–6 (9–2)	19 – Mershon	7 – Mershon	6 – Mershon	Daskalakis Athletic Center (1,793); Philadelphia, PA
February 14, 2013; 12:00 pm		at Hofstra	L 43–53	16–7 (9–3)	12 – Mershon	7 – Tied	3 – Johnson-Allen	Mack Sports Complex (2,126); Hempstead, NY
February 19, 2013; 7:00 pm		UNC Wilmington	W 59–47	17–7 (10–3)	25 – Wootton	7 – Mershon	5 – Creighton	Daskalakis Athletic Center (846); Philadelphia, PA
February 21, 2013; 7:00 pm		George Mason	W 57–46	18–7 (11–3)	26 – Mershon	6 – Redick	4 – Creighton	Daskalakis Athletic Center (689); Philadelphia, PA
February 24, 2013; 2:00 pm		William & Mary	W 62–47	19–7 (12–3)	20 – Creighton	12 – Johnson-Allen	8 – Mershon	Daskalakis Athletic Center (1,382); Philadelphia, PA
February 28, 2013; 7:00 pm		at Georgia State	W 58–49	20–7 (13–3)	23 – Mershon	12 – Johnson-Allen	3 – Mershon	GSU Sports Arena (469); Atlanta, GA
March 3, 2013; 3:30 pm		at No. 18 Delaware	L 57–62	20–8 (13–4)	26 – Mershon	5 – Tied	6 – Mershon	Bob Carpenter Center (5,094); Newark, DE
March 6, 2013; 7:00 pm		James Madison	L 53–62	20–9 (13–4)	27 – Mershon	6 – Tied	6 – Mershon	Daskalakis Athletic Center (864); Philadelphia, PA
CAA Tournament
March 15, 2013; 7:30 pm	(3)	vs. (6) William & Mary; Quarterfinals	W 65–31	21–9	17 – Wootton	9 – Wootton	6 – Mershon	Show Place Arena (2,396); Upper Marlboro, MD
March 16, 2013; 4:30 pm	(3)	vs. (2) James Madison; Semifinals	W 50–34	22–9	21 – Mershon	9 – Flanagan	5 – Mershon	Show Place Arena (2,296); Upper Marlboro, MD
March 17, 2013; 2:00 pm, CBSSN	(3)	vs. (1) No. 15 Delaware; Championship	L 56–59	22–10	21 – Wootton	8 – Redick	9 – Mershon	Show Place Arena (2,160); Upper Marlboro, MD
WNIT
March 21, 2013; 7:00 pm		Iona; First round	W 59–50	23–10	15 – Mershon	5 – Tied	6 – Mershon	Daskalakis Athletic Center (487); Philadelphia, PA
March 23, 2013; 7:00 pm		Harvard; Second round	W 82–72	24–10	32 – Mershon	9 – Wootton	9 – Mershon	Daskalakis Athletic Center (488); Philadelphia, PA
March 28, 2013; 7:00 pm		at Bowling Green; Third round	W 50–47	25–10	19 – Mershon	8 – Johnson-Allen	4 – Mershon	Stroh Center (1,571); Bowling Green, OH
March 30, 2013; 7:00 pm		at Auburn; Quarterfinals	W 56–43	26–10	19 – Mershon	13 – Mershon	7 – Mershon	Auburn Arena (1,421); Auburn, AL
April 3, 2013; 7:00 pm		Florida; Semifinals	W 67–57	27–10	28 – Mershon	7 – Johnson-Allen	10 – Mershon	Daskalakis Athletic Center (1,412); Philadelphia, PA
April 6, 2013; 3:00 pm		Utah; Championship	W 46–43	28–10	16 – Wootton	8 – Mershon	3 – Mershon	Daskalakis Athletic Center (1,922); Philadelphia, PA
*Non-conference game. ^{#}Rankings from AP. (#) Tournament seedings in parentheses. All times are in Eastern Time.

== Rankings ==
Ranking movements Legend: RV = Received votes
	Week																			
Poll	Pre	1	2	3	4	5	6	7	8	9	10	11	12	13	14	15	16	17	18	Final
AP																				Not released
Coaches																				RV

*AP does not release post-NCAA Tournament rankings

== See also ==
2012–13 Drexel Dragons men's basketball team
