= Hollie Mershon =

American basketball player (born 1990)

No. 11 – Udominate Basket
- Position: Point guard / shooting guard
- League: Eurocup

Personal information
- Born: September 26, 1990 (age 34); Philadelphia, Pennsylvania, U.S.
- Listed height: 5 ft 9.5 in (1.77 m)

Career information
- High school: Archbishop Carroll (Radnor, Pennsylvania)
- College: Drexel (2009–2013)
- WNBA draft: 2013: undrafted

Career highlights
- WNIT champion (2013); WNIT MVP (2013); First-team All-CAA (2013)

Hollie Elizabeth Mershon (born September 26, 1990) is an American professional basketball player currently playing for Udominate Basket in Umeå, Sweden, Eurocup Division. Mershon played her rookie professional year 2013 to 2014 in the Euroleague as point guard for the Kibirstis Vici Iki team in Vilnius, Lithuania. In 2017, Mershon was named as one of the Top 20 Players of all time in the WNIT, Women's National Invitation Tournament.

== Early years ==
Mershon was born on September 26, 1990, in Philadelphia, Pennsylvania. As a high school senior at Archbishop Carroll High School in Radnor, Pennsylvania, she led her team in tournament scoring to win the Pennsylvania State Championship in Division AAA of women's basketball.

She played her college career at Drexel University in Philadelphia. She led the 2013 team, coached by Denise Dillon, to win the 2013 Women's National Invitation Tournament (WNIT) championship and was named the All Tournament MVP. (Contests won en route to the championship: Iona College, Harvard University, Bowling Green University, Auburn University, University of Florida and University of Utah). At Drexel, she is the 6th all-time leading scorer and 3rd all time in assists.

== Drexel statistics ==
Legend
GP	Games played	GS	Games started	MPG	Minutes per game
FG%	Field goal percentage	3P%	3-point field goal percentage	FT%	Free throw percentage
RPG	Rebounds per game	APG	Assists per game	SPG	Steals per game
BPG	Blocks per game	PPG	Points per game	**Bold**	Career high

Year	Team	GP	Points	FG%	3P%	FT%	RPG	APG	SPG	BPG	PPG
2009-10	Drexel	27	68	36.4	27.5	**100.0**	2.1	0.9	0.4	0.1	2.5
2010-11	Drexel	32	312	**43.0**	**43.3**	89.8	4.3	2.2	0.9	**0.2**	9.8
2011-12	Drexel	33	480	40.5	33.5	75.3	5.2	3.3	1.1	0.1	14.5
2012-13	Drexel	**38**	**741**	41.2	35.5	86.1	**6.2**	**4.9**	**1.3**	0.1	**19.5**
Career	Drexel	130	1601	41.1	35.8	84.0	4.6	3.0	1.0	0.1	12.3

== Professional career ==
Mershon played her rookie professional year 2013–14 in the Euroleague as point guard for Kibirstis Vici Iki, in Vilnius, Lithuania. In 2014–15, Mershon played Eurocup in Portugal with Quinta dos Lombos and then transferred back to Lithuania playing for Utena. Mershon played Eurocup for A3 basket in Umeå Sweden for four seasons (2015-2019)

=== Career highlights ===
- 2014 - Lithuanian Cup Champions, Lithuanian National Champions, Baltic League Champions - Kibirkstis Vici Iki;
- 2015 - Lithuanian Cup Champions, Lithuanian National Champions, Undefeated season - Utena;
- 2019 - Swedish National Champions

== Personal life ==
Mershon is the daughter of Janie and John Mershon. She has an older brother John and a younger brother Thomas. Mershon has been active in community service volunteering for many organizations in the Philadelphia area including the Support Center for Child Advocates. Mershon has won the Philly College Sports Female Athlete of the Year and the Dean Ehler's Award.
