= 2012–13 Georgia State Panthers women's basketball team =

Intercollegiate basketball season

2012–13 Georgia State Panthers women's basketball
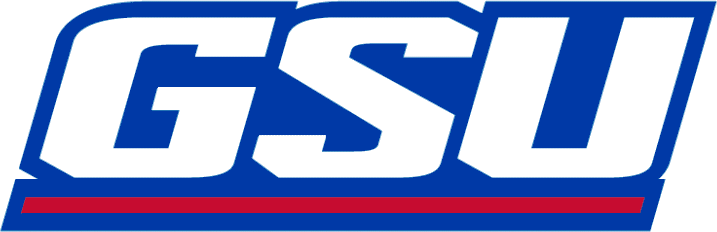
- Conference: Colonial Athletic Association
- Record: 13–16 (5–13 CAA)
- Head coach: Sharon Baldwin-Tener (Third season)
- Assistant coaches: Johnathon Barbaree (Second season); Adrienne Shuler (Third season); Jocelyn Wyatt (Third season)
- Home arena: GSU Sports Arena (Capacity: 4,500)

2012–13 CAA women's basketball standings
	Conf.				Overall
Team	W		L	PCT	W		L	PCT
No. 15 Delaware†	18	–	0	1.000	32	–	4	.889
James Madison	15	–	3	.833	25	–	11	.694
Drexel	13	–	5	.722	28	–	10	.737
Northeastern	10	–	8	.556	17	–	13	.567
Old Dominion	10	–	8	.556	19	–	12	.613
Hofstra	9	–	9	.500	14	–	17	.452
Towson	6	–	12	.333	12	–	18	.400
William & Mary	6	–	12	.333	8	–	22	.267
Georgia State	5	–	13	.278	13	–	16	.448
George Mason	4	–	14	.222	9	–	21	.300
UNC Wilmington	3	–	15	.167	5	–	26	.161
† 2013 CAA tournament winner Rankings from AP poll

The 2012–13 Georgia State Panthers women's basketball team represented Georgia State University in the 2012–13 NCAA Division I women's basketball season. The Panthers, coached by Sharon Baldwin-Tener, were a member of the Colonial Athletic Association, and played their home games on campus at the GSU Sports Arena. The 2012–13 season represented the last season that the Panthers played in the CAA as they joined the Sun Belt Conference in 2013.

== Season Notes ==
- Due to Georgia State's exit from the Colonial Athletic Association, the Panthers were not eligible to compete in the CAA basketball tournament.

== 2012–13 roster ==
From the official GSU women's basketball site:

#	Name	Height	Position	Class	Hometown	Previous Team(s)
Scholarship Players
4	Tiffany Anderson	5'9"	G	Sr.	Albany, GA	Dougherty High School
5	Alisha Andrews	4'11"	G	Jr.	Stone Mountain, GA	Redan High School
12	Ashlee Cole	5'8"	G	Fr.	Ellenwood, GA	Forest Park High School
34	Kyra Crosby	6'1"	F	RSr.	Powder Springs, GA	McEachern High School
35	Maryam Dogo	6'2"	F	RSo.	Kaduna, Nigeria	Lamar Community College
21	Morgan Jackson	6'0"	F	Fr.	Gainesville, GA	East Hall High School
10	Kendra Long	5'9"	G	Jr.	Atlanta, GA	Mays High School
1	Kesheria McNeil	5'8"	G	Jr.	Raleigh, NC	Miami Dade High School, Garner High School
24	Gaby Moss	5'8"	G	Fr.	Alexandria, VA	T.C. Williams High School
20	Kayla Nolan	5'8"	G	So.	Duluth, GA	Duluth High School
33	Cody Paulk	6'3"	F/C	Sr.	Gadsden, AL	Gadsden City High School
2	Miranda Smith	5'9"	F/C	So.	Roanoke, VA	Patrick Henry High School
23	Ashley Watson	5'6"	G	So.	San Jose, CA	Archbishop Mitty High School

== 2012–13 Schedule ==
Date time, TV	Rank^{#}	Opponent^{#}	Result	Record	Site (attendance) city, state
Regular Season
November 9*; 7:00 pm		at Central Florida	W 64–50	1–0	UCF Arena (361); Orlando, FL
November 11*; 1:00 pm		at Florida	L 65–84	1–1	O'Connell Center (795); Gainesville, FL
November 14*; 7:00 pm		Jacksonville State	W 79–50	2–1	GSU Sports Arena (656); Atlanta, GA
November 23*; 2:00 pm		Georgia Southern; GSU Thanksgiving Tournament	W 73–48	3–1	GSU Sports Arena (505); Atlanta, GA
November 24*; 4:00 pm		Florida A&M; GSU Thanksgiving Tournament	W 77–58	4–1	GSU Sports Arena (521); Atlanta, GA
December 2*; 2:00 pm		Kennesaw State	W 63–42	5–1	GSU Sports Arena (517); Atlanta, GA
December 13*; 1:00 pm		at Belmont	L 62–85	5–2	Curb Event Center (303); Nashville, TN
December 16*; 2:00 pm		Morehead State	W 61–47	6–2	GSU Sports Arena (412); Atlanta, GA
December 21*; 7:00 pm		Western Carolina	W 64–45	7–2	GSU Sports Arena (762); Atlanta, GA
December 29*; 2:00 pm		Mississippi Valley State; GSU Holiday & Hoops Tournament	W 76–60	8–2	GSU Sports Arena (546); Atlanta, GA
December 30*; 4:00 pm		Toledo; GSU Holiday & Hoops Tournament	L 43–46	8–3	GSU Sports Arena (508); Atlanta, GA
January 6; 2:00 pm		Old Dominion	L 66–72	8–4 (0–1)	GSU Sports Arena (493); Atlanta, GA
January 10; 7:00 pm		at Hofstra	L 63–64	8–5 (0–2)	Hofstra Arena (107); Hempstead, NY
January 13; 12:00 pm		at Towson	W 56–49	9–5 (1–2)	Towson Center (457); Towson, MD
January 17; 7:00 pm		Northeastern	W 68–55	9–6 (1–3)	GSU Sports Arena (441); Atlanta, GA
January 20; 2:00 pm		James Madison	L 49–65	9–7 (1–4)	GSU Sports Arena (402); Atlanta, GA
January 24; 7:00 pm		at Old Dominion	L 45–68	9–8 (1–5)	Ted Constant Convocation Center (2062); Norfolk, VA
January 27; 2:00 pm		at George Mason	W 64–52	10–8 (2–5)	Patriot Center (1942); Fairfax, VA
January 31; 7:00 pm		No. 25 Delaware	L 38–70	10–9 (2–6)	GSU Sports Arena (738); Atlanta, GA
February 3; 2:00 pm		at Drexel	L 55–79	10–10 (2–7)	Daskalakis Athletic Center (903); Philadelphia, PA
February 7; 7:00 pm		William & Mary	W 57–52	11–10 (3–7)	GSU Sports Arena (439); Atlanta, GA
February 10; 12:00 pm, CSS		Hofstra	L 59–72	11–11 (3–8)	GSU Sports Arena (659); Atlanta, GA
February 14; 7:00 pm		Towson	W 66–44	12–11 (4–8)	GSU Sports Arena (435); Atlanta, GA
February 17; 1:00 pm		at UNC-Wilmington	L 83–84	12–12 (4–9)	Trask Coliseum (657); Wilmington, NC
February 21; 1:00 pm		at Northeastern	L 50–65	12–13 (4–10)	Cabot Center (404); Boston, MA
February 24; 2:00 pm		George Mason	W 67–51	13–13 (5–10)	GSU Sports Arena (612); Atlanta, GA
February 26; 7:00 pm		at William & Mary	L 73–79	13–14 (5–11)	Kaplan Arena (365); Williamsburg, VA
February 28; 7:00 pm		Drexel	L 49–58	13–15 (5–12)	GSU Sports Arena (469); Atlanta, GA
March 6; 7:00 pm		at No. 20 Delaware	W 86–58	13–16 (5–13)	Bob Carpenter Center (5,092); Newark, DE
*Non-conference game. ^{#}Rankings from AP Poll. (#) Tournament seedings in parentheses. All times are in Eastern Time.
