= 2012–13 Delaware Fightin' Blue Hens women's basketball team =

Intercollegiate basketball season

2012–13 Delaware Fightin' Blue Hens women's basketball

CAA regular season & tournament champions

NCAA women's tournament, Sweet Sixteen
- Conference: Colonial Athletic Association

Ranking
- Coaches: No. 13
- AP: No. 15
- Record: 32–4 (18–0 CAA)
- Head coach: Tina Martin (17th season)
- Assistant coaches: Jeanine Radice; Tom Lochner; Tiara Malcom
- Home arena: Bob Carpenter Center

2012–13 CAA women's basketball standings
	Conf.				Overall
Team	W		L	PCT	W		L	PCT
No. 15 Delaware†	18	–	0	1.000	32	–	4	.889
James Madison	15	–	3	.833	25	–	11	.694
Drexel	13	–	5	.722	28	–	10	.737
Northeastern	10	–	8	.556	17	–	13	.567
Old Dominion	10	–	8	.556	19	–	12	.613
Hofstra	9	–	9	.500	14	–	17	.452
Towson	6	–	12	.333	12	–	18	.400
William & Mary	6	–	12	.333	8	–	22	.267
Georgia State	5	–	13	.278	13	–	16	.448
George Mason	4	–	14	.222	9	–	21	.300
UNC Wilmington	3	–	15	.167	5	–	26	.161
† 2013 CAA tournament winner Rankings from AP poll

The 2012–13 Delaware Fightin' Blue Hens women's basketball team represented the University of Delaware during the 2012–13 NCAA Division I women's basketball season. The Fightin' Blue Hens, led by seventeenth year head coach Tina Martin, played their home games at the Bob Carpenter Center and were members of the Colonial Athletic Association. They finished the season 32–4, 18-0 CAA play to finish in first place for the second consecutive season. They won the 2013 CAA Women's Basketball Tournament for the second year in a row, defeating Drexel once again in the finals. A #6 seed in the Bridgeport region of the NCAA Division I women's basketball tournament, the Blue Hens defeated West Virginia and North Carolina at home to advance to their first ever Sweet Sixteen, where they fell to Kentucky.

== Roster ==
2012–13 Delaware Fightin' Blue Hens women's basketball team
Players
Coaches

Pos.	#	Name	Height	Year	Previous school	Hometown
G	2	Courtni Green	5 ft 7 in (1.7 m)	Fr	Millbrook HS	Winchester, Virginia
G	3	Jaquetta May	5 ft 9 in (1.75 m)	Sr	Delcastle Tech HS	Wilmington, Delaware
G	4	Jodi Salyer (redshirt)	5 ft 10 in (1.78 m)	Fr	Staunton River HS	Roanoke, Virginia
G	10	Kayla Miller	5 ft 8 in (1.73 m)	Sr	Ursuline Academy	Wilmington, Delaware
F	11	Elena Delle Donne (C)	6 ft 5 in (1.96 m)	Sr	Ursuline Academy	Wilmington, Delaware
F	12	Danielle Parker	6 ft 2 in (1.88 m)	Sr	Dulaney HS	Phoenix, Maryland
F	13	Kelsey Buchanan	6 ft 3 in (1.91 m)	Jr	Freedom HS	South Riding, Virginia
F	14	Alecia Bell	6 ft 0 in (1.83 m)	Fr	Woodside HS	Newport News, Virginia
G	15	Akeema Richards	5 ft 7 in (1.7 m)	Jr	Western HS	Baltimore, Maryland
G	21	Trumae Lucas	5 ft 8 in (1.73 m)	Sr	Grimsley HS	Greensboro, North Carolina
G	22	Lauren Carra	5 ft 9 in (1.75 m)	Sr	Dunmore HS	Dunmore, Pennsylvania
G	23	Jade Clark	6 ft 0 in (1.83 m)	Fr	St. John's College HS	Ashburn, Virginia
F	24	Joy Caracciolo (I)	6 ft 1 in (1.85 m)	RS So	Stonewall Jackson HS	Manassas, Virginia
C	33	Stephanie Leon	6 ft 4 in (1.93 m)	So	Northport HS	Northport, New York
F	45	Chelsea Craig (C)	6 ft 2 in (1.88 m)	Sr	Wooton HS	Rockville, Maryland

Head coach

- Tina Martin (Lock Haven)

Assistant coach(es)

- Jeanine Radice (Fordham)
- Tom Lochner (Temple)
- Tiara Malcom (Delaware)

Legend

- (C) Team captain
- (S) Suspended
- (I) Ineligible
- (W) Walk-on
- Injured
- Current redshirt

Roster
Last update: 16 March 2017

== Schedule ==
Date time, TV	Rank^{#}	Opponent^{#}	Result	Record	Site (attendance) city, state
Regular season
11/9/2012*; 8:00 pm	No. 11	Sam Houston State; Preseason NIT	W 63-31	1-0	Bob Carpenter Center (1,872); Newark, Delaware
11/11/2012*; 2:00 pm	No. 11	Georgetown; Preseason NIT	L 56-62	1–1	Bob Carpenter Center (859); Newark, Delaware
11/14/2012*; 7:00 pm	No. 17	at Duquesne	L 47-51	1–2	Palumbo Center (1,126); Pittsburgh, Pennsylvania
11/20/2012*; 7:00 pm		Providence	W 64-46	2-2	Bob Carpenter Center (3,390); Newark, Delaware
11/28/2012*; 7:00 pm		St. Bonaventure	W 68–58	3-2	Bob Carpenter Center (3,596); Newark, Delaware
12/05/2012*; 7:30 pm, ESPN3		at Rhode Island	W 57–40	4-2	Ryan Center (689); Kingston, Rhode Island
12/09/2012*; 2:00 pm		Princeton	W 59-58	5-2	Bob Carpenter Center (4,029); Newark, Delaware
12/20/2012*; 7:00 pm		No. 9 Maryland	L 53-69	5-3	Bob Carpenter Center (5,089); Newark, Delaware
12/22/2012*; 3:00 pm		at Monmouth	W 82-53	6-3	The MAC (710); West Long Branch, New Jersey
12/29/2012*; 5:00 pm		vs. Villanova; Dartmouth Blue Sky Classic	W 59–45	7-3	Leede Arena (843); Hanover, New Hampshire
12/30/2012*; 7:00 pm		vs. Duquesne; Dartmouth Blue Sky Classic	W 60–45	8-3	Leede Arena (748); Hanover, New Hampshire
01/02/2013*; 7:00 pm, ESPN3		at Saint John's	W 60-59 ^{OT}	9-3	Carnesecca Arena (829); Queens, New York
01/10/2013; 7:00 pm		George Mason	W 62-27	10-3 (1-0)	Bob Carpenter Center (4,212); Newark, Delaware
01/13/2013; 2:00 pm		at Old Dominion	W 63-46	11-3 (2-0)	Constant Center (2,739); Norfolk, Virginia
01/15/2013; 7:00 pm		at Northeastern	W 76-51	12-3 (3-0)	Solomon Court (429); Boston, Massachusetts
01/20/2013; 2:00 pm		Towson	W 76-44	13-3 (4-0)	Bob Carpenter Center (4,738); Newark, Delaware
01/24/2013; 7:00 pm		UNC Wilmington	W 67-39	14-3 (5-0)	Bob Carpenter Center (4,151); Newark, Delaware
01/27/2013; 2:00 pm		at Drexel	W 65-56	15-3 (6-0)	Daskalakis Athletic Center (2,532); Philadelphia, Pennsylvania
01/29/2013; 7:00 pm	No. 25	Northeastern	L 56–61	16-3 (7-0)	Bob Carpenter Center (3,583); Newark, Delaware
01/31/2013; 7:00 pm	No. 25	at Georgia State	W 70-38	17-3 (8-0)	GSU Sports Arena (738); Atlanta, Georgia
02/03/2013; 2:00 pm	No. 25	Hofstra	W 79-63	18-3 (9-0)	Bob Carpenter Center (5,005); Newark, Delaware
02/07/2013; 7:00 pm	No. 20	at Towson	W 77-55	19-3 (10-0)	Towson Center (835); Towson, Maryland
02/10/2013; 2:00 pm	No. 20	at James Madison	W 71-64	20-3 (11-0)	JMU Convocation Center (3,787); Harrisonburg, Virginia
02/14/2013; 7:00 pm	No. 20	Old Dominion	W 86-62	21-3 (12-0)	Bob Carpenter Center (4,382); Newark, Delaware
02/17/2013; 2:00 pm	No. 20	at William & Mary	W 66-44	22-3 (13-0)	Kaplan Arena (680); Williamsburg, Virginia
02/19/2013; 7:00 pm	No. 18	at George Mason	W 69-55	23–3 (14-0)	Patriot Center (1,349); Fairfax, Virginia
02/24/2013; 4:30 pm, CSN	No. 18	James Madison	W 61-60	24-3 (15-0)	Bob Carpenter Center (5,098); Newark, Delaware
02/28/2013; 7:00 pm	No. 18	at Hofstra	W 79-50	25-3 (16-0)	Mack Sports Complex (506); Hempstead, New York
03/03/2013; 3:30 pm, CSN	No. 18	Drexel	W 62-57	26-3 (17-0)	Bob Carpenter Center (5,094); Newark, Delaware
03/06/2013; 7:00 pm	No. 16	at Georgia State	W 86-58	27-3 (18-0)	Bob Carpenter Center (5,092); Newark, Delaware
CAA tournament
03/15/2013; 12:00 pm	No. 15	vs. UNC Wilmington; Quarterfinals	W 51-43	28-3	Show Place Arena (2,396); Upper Marlboro, Maryland
03/16/2013; 2:00 pm, CSN	No. 15	vs. Hofstra; Semifinals	W 75-54	29-3	Show Place Arena (2,296); Upper Marlboro, Maryland
03/17/2015; 2:00 pm, CSN	No. 15	vs. Drexel; CAA Championship	W 59-56	30-3	Show Place Arena (2,160); Upper Marlboro, Maryland
NCAA tournament
03/24/2015; 12:15 pm, ESPN2	(6) No. 15	(11) West Virginia; First Round	W 66-53	31-3	Bob Carpenter Center (4,532); Newark, Delaware
03/26/2013; 7:00 pm, ESPN2	(6) No. 15	(3) No. 13 North Carolina; Second Round	W 78-69	32-3	Bob Carpenter Center (4,653); Newark, Delaware
03/30/2013; 2:00 pm, ESPN	(6) No. 15	vs. (2) No. 7 Kentucky; Sweet Sixteen	L 62-69	32-4	Webster Bank Arena (8,596); Bridgeport, Connecticut
*Non-conference game. ^{#}Rankings from AP Poll. (#) Tournament seedings in parentheses. All times are in Eastern Time.

== Rankings ==
Ranking movement Legend: ██ Increase in ranking. ██ Decrease in ranking. ██ Not ranked the previous week. RV=Received votes.
Poll	Pre- Season	Week 2	Week 3	Week 4	Week 5	Week 6	Week 7	Week 8	Week 9	Week 10	Week 11	Week 12	Week 13	Week 14	Week 15	Week 16	Week 17	Week 18	Week 19	Post Season	Final
AP	11	17	RV	RV	RV	RV	RV	RV	RV	RV	RV	RV	25	20	20	18	18	16	15	15	N/A
Coaches	10	17	RV	RV	RV	RV	RV	RV	RV	RV	RV	RV	RV	23	22	19	18	16	16	16	13

== Awards and honors ==
- Elena Delle Donne was selected as the Honda National Women's Basketball Player of the Year and a finalist for the Honda-Broderick Cup as Collegiate Woman Athlete of the Year.
- Elena Delle Donne was a consensus 1st team All-American (AP, WBCA, Wooden, USBWA) and the CoSIDA Academic All-American of the Year.
- Elena Delle Donne received CAA Player of the Year, first team All-CAA selection, and CAA All-Defensive team, while Lauren Carra was selected to the second team All-CAA.

== Team players drafted into the WNBA ==
Round	Pick	Player	WNBA club
1	2	Elena Delle Donne	Chicago Sky
