= 2025–26 Villanova Wildcats women's basketball team =

Intercollegiate basketball season

2025–26 Villanova Wildcats women's basketball

Big 5 Classic champions

NCAA tournament, First Round
- Conference: Big East Conference
- Record: 25–8 (16–4 Big East)
- Head coach: Denise Dillon (6th season)
- Associate head coach: Joe Mullaney
- Assistant coaches: Michelle Sword; Tiara Malcom; Jess Genco
- Home arena: Finneran Pavilion

2025–26 Big East women's basketball standings
	Conf.				Overall
Team	W		L	PCT	W		L	PCT
No. 1 UConn †	20	–	0	1.000	35	–	0	1.000
Villanova	16	–	4	.800	25	–	8	.758
Seton Hall	12	–	8	.600	19	–	13	.594
Marquette	12	–	8	.600	18	–	12	.600
Creighton	11	–	9	.550	16	–	15	.516
St. John's	11	–	9	.550	22	–	12	.647
Providence	7	–	13	.350	15	–	18	.455
Butler	6	–	14	.300	12	–	19	.387
Georgetown	6	–	14	.300	14	–	17	.452
DePaul	5	–	15	.250	8	–	24	.250
Xavier	4	–	16	.200	11	–	19	.367
† 2026 Big East tournament winner As of March 21, 2026; Rankings from AP poll

The 2025–26 Villanova Wildcats women's basketball team currently represents Villanova University in the 2025–26 NCAA Division I women's basketball season. The Wildcats, led by sixth-year head coach Denise Dillon, play their home games at the Finneran Pavilion in Villanova, Pennsylvania and are members of the Big East Conference.

== Previous season ==
The Wildcats finished the 2024–25 season 21–15 and 11–7 in Big East play to clinch the No. 5 seed in the Big East tournament. They beat No. 4 Marquette in the quarterfinals before losing to No. 1 UConn in the semifinals.

They once again received an at-large bid to the WBIT, defeating Boston College and Saint Joseph's in the first and second rounds as well as Portland in the quarterfinals, before falling to eventual runners-up Belmont in the semifinals.

== Offseason ==
=== Departures ===
Villanova Departures
Name	Num	Pos.	Height	Year	Hometown	Reason for Departure
Kaitlyn Orihel	4	G	5'10"	Senior	Newtown, PA	Graduated
Bronagh Power-Cassidy	7	G	5'10"	Graduate Student	Dublin, Ireland	Graduated
Jaliyah Green	8	G	5'10"	Senior	St. Louis, MO	Graduated
Lara Edmanson	14	G/F	6'0"	Graduate Student	Melbourne, Australia	Graduated
Maddie Burke	23	G	6'0"	Graduate Student	Doylestown, PA	Graduated
Maddie Webber	34	G	5'11"	Junior	Sparta, NJ	Transferred to Illinois

=== Incoming transfers ===
Villanova Incoming Transfers
Name	Num	Pos.	Height	Year	Hometown	Previous School
Kylee Watson	4	F	6'4"	Graduate Student	Linwood, NJ	Notre Dame
Kelsey Joens	23	G	5'10"	Junior	Iowa City, Iowa	Iowa State

=== Recruiting class ===
College recruiting information
Name	Hometown	School	Height	Weight	Commit date
Kennedy Henry; G	Blairstown, NJ	Blair Academy	6 ft 0 in (1.83 m)	N/A	
Kennedy Henry; G	Recruit ratings: ESPN: (92)				
Overall recruit ranking:
Note: In many cases, Scout, Rivals, 247Sports, On3, and ESPN may conflict in their listings of height and weight.; In these cases, the average was taken. ESPN grades are on a 100-point scale.; Sources: "2025 Player Commits". ESPN. Archived from the original on November 14, 2025.

== Roster ==
2025–26 Villanova Wildcats women's basketball team
Players
Coaches

Pos.	#	Name	Height	Year	Previous school	Hometown
G	3	MD Ntambue	5 ft 9 in (1.75 m)	Fr	Crestwood	Montreal, Quebec
F	4	Kylee Watson	6 ft 4 in (1.93 m)	GS	Mainland; Notre Dame	Linwood, NJ
G	5	Ryanne Allen	6 ft 1 in (1.85 m)	Sr	Archbishop Wood; Vanderbilt	Warminster, PA
G	11	Jasmine Bascoe	5 ft 7 in (1.7 m)	So	King's Christian	Milton, Ontario
G	12	Elise Bender	6 ft 1 in (1.85 m)	Fr	Anthony Wayne	Whitehouse, OH
F	13	Brynn McCurry	6 ft 1 in (1.85 m)	Jr	Sparta	Sparta, NJ
G	14	Brooke Bender	6 ft 1 in (1.85 m)	Fr	Anthony Wayne	Whitehouse, OH
G	22	Kennedy Henry	6 ft 0 in (1.83 m)	Fr	Westtown School	Hockessin, DE
G	23	Kelsey Joens	5 ft 10 in (1.78 m)	Jr	West Liberty; Iowa State	Iowa City, Iowa
F	25	Denae Carter	6 ft 0 in (1.83 m)	Sr	St. Basil Academy; Mississippi State	Philadelphia, PA
G	24	Dani Ceseretti	6 ft 0 in (1.83 m)	So	Northfield Mount Hermon	Barrington, RI
F	43	Annie Welde	6 ft 0 in (1.83 m)	Sr	Cardinal O'Hara	Bridgeville, PA
G	44	Maggie Grant	6 ft 0 in (1.83 m)	Sr	Archbishop John Carroll	Downingtown, PA
F	45	Rachel Wirts	6 ft 3 in (1.91 m)	So	Center Grove	Greenwood, IN

Head coach

Denise Dillon (Villanova)

Assistant coach(es)

- Joe Mullaney (Providence)
- Michelle Sword (Saint Joseph's)
- Tiara Malcom (Delaware)
- Jess Genco (Northeastern)

Legend

- (C) Team captain
- (S) Suspended
- (I) Ineligible
- (W) Walk-on
- Injured
- Current redshirt

Roster
Last update: November 14, 2025

== Schedule and results ==
Date time, TV	Rank^{#}	Opponent^{#}	Result	Record	High points	High rebounds	High assists	Site (attendance) city, state
Regular season
November 3, 2025*; 7:00 p.m., ESPN+		Lafayette	W 70–38	1–0	13 – Henry	7 – Carter	5 – McCurry	Finneran Pavilion (1,061); Villanova, PA
November 5, 2025*; 7:00 p.m., ESPN+		Fairfield	L 63–75	1–1	30 – Bascoe	8 – Bascoe	4 – Kennedy	Finneran Pavilion (1,211); Villanova, PA
November 9, 2025*; 2:00 p.m., YouTube		vs. VCU	W 74–40	2–1	17 – Bascoe	6 – 2 Tied	7 – Kennedy	Mattamy Athletic Centre; Toronto, ON
November 10, 2025*; 2:00 p.m., ESPN+		Princeton	L 68–73	2–2	16 – Bascoe	6 – 2 Tied	5 – McCurry	Finneran Pavilion (1,051); Villanova, PA
November 16, 2025*; 2:00 p.m., ESPN+		at James Madison	W 84–73	3–2	18 – McCurry	5 – Tied	7 – McCurry	Atlantic Union Bank Center (2,255); Harrisonburg, VA
November 22, 2025*; 7:00 p.m., ESPN+		Temple; Big 5 Classic Pod 2	W 88–58	4–2	19 – Allen	8 – McCurry	7 – Ceseretti	Finneran Pavilion (1,551); Villanova, PA
November 25, 2025*; 6:30 p.m., ESPN+		at La Salle; Big 5 Classic Pod 2	W 66–54	5–2	18 – McCurry	7 – McCurry	5 – McCurry	John Glaser Arena (287); Philadelphia, PA
December 1, 2025*; 7:00 p.m., ESPN+		at No. 25 West Virginia	W 81–59	6–2	24 – Bascoe	9 – McCurry	6 – Bascoe	Hope Coliseum (2,661); Morgantown, WV
December 4, 2025; 2:00 p.m., Peacock		at Georgetown	W 76–69	7–2 (1–0)	26 – Bascoe	7 – McCurry	4 – Tied	McDonough Arena (383); Washington, D.C.
December 7, 2025*; 4:30 p.m.		Saint Joseph's; Big 5 Classic Championship	W 76–70	8–2	21 – McCurry	8 – Carter	5 – Bascoe	Finneran Pavilion (1,242); Villanova, PA
December 19, 2025; 7:00 p.m., ESPN+		Seton Hall	W 72–55	9–2 (2–0)	20 – Bascoe	7 – Bascoe	8 – McCurry	Finneran Pavilion (1,113); Villanova, PA
December 22, 2025; 12:00 p.m., ESPN+		St. John's	W 85–48	10–2 (3–0)	21 – Bascoe	9 – Carter	9 – Bascoe	Finneran Pavilion (909); Villanova, PA
December 29, 2025; 7:00 p.m., ESPN+		at DePaul	W 81–48	11–2 (4–0)	18 – McCurry	7 – Tied	7 – McCurry	Wintrust Arena (1,420); Chicago, IL
January 1, 2026; 12:00 p.m., ESPN+		Creighton	W 74–64	12–2 (5–0)	19 – Henry	6 – Tied	6 – Bascoe	Finneran Pavilion (1,527); Villanova, PA
January 4, 2026; 4:00 p.m., Peacock		at Marquette	L 69–85	12–3 (5–1)	20 – Bascoe	5 – Tied	4 – Tied	Al McGuire Center (1,660); Milwaukee, WI
January 8, 2026; 11:30 a.m., ESPN+		Xavier	W 67–50	13–3 (6–1)	18 – Jones	7 – McCurry	7 – Bascoe	Finneran Pavilion (1,511); Villanova, PA
January 11, 2026; 12:00 p.m., TruTV		at Providence	W 85–55	14–3 (7–1)	20 – McCurry	8 – Carter	7 – Tied	Alumni Hall (816); Providence, RI
January 15, 2026; 7:00 p.m., FS1		at No. 1 UConn	L 50–99	14–4 (7–2)	12 – Henry	5 – McCurry	4 – Bascoe	Harry A. Gampel Pavilion (10,244); Storrs, CT
January 18, 2026; 2:00 p.m., ESPN+		Butler	W 73–65	15–4 (8–2)	22 – Bascoe	5 – McCurry	6 – Bascoe	Finneran Pavilion (1,741); Villanova, PA
January 24, 2026; 2:00 p.m., FS1		at St. John's	L 58–71	15–5 (8–3)	12 – Allen	7 – Henry	5 – Bascoe	Carnesecca Arena (1,039); Queens, NY
January 27, 2026; 2:00 p.m., ESPN+		Providence	W 83–68	16–5 (9–3)	22 – Bascoe	7 – Carter	6 – Bascoe	Finneran Pavilion (1,069); Villanova, PA
January 31, 2026; 2:00 p.m., ESPN+		DePaul	W 69–56	17–5 (10–3)	27 – Bascoe	7 – Bender	6 – Henry	Finneran Pavilion (2,015); Villanova, PA
February 4, 2026; 2:00 p.m., ESPN+		at Butler	W 67–57	18–5 (11–3)	27 – Bascoe	5 – Henry	5 – Bascoe	Hinkle Fieldhouse (1,176); Indianapolis, IN
February 7, 2026; 2:00 p.m., ESPN+		Georgetown	W 67–55	19–5 (12–3)	19 – Bascoe	6 – Joens	6 – Carter	Finneran Pavilion (1,651); Villanova, PA
February 11, 2026; 6:30 p.m., ESPN+		at Xavier	W 78–38	20–5 (13–3)	18 – Bascoe	9 – Watson	7 – Bascoe	Cintas Center (1,069); Cincinnati, OH
February 15, 2026; 5:00 p.m., TruTV		at Creighton	W 74–64	21–5 (14–3)	21 – Bascoe	9 – McCurry	5 – Bascoe	D. J. Sokol Arena (1,465); Omaha, NE
February 18, 2026; 7:00 p.m., Peacock		No. 1 UConn	L 69–83	21–6 (14–4)	26 – Bascoe	9 – Bascoe	7 – Bascoe	Finneran Pavilion (3,719); Villanova, PA
February 22, 2026; 3:30 p.m., Peacock		Marquette	W 64–39	22–6 (15–4)	18 – Bascoe	5 – Tied	7 – Bascoe	Finneran Pavilion (1,651); Villanova, PA
February 26, 2026; 7:00 p.m., Peacock		at Seton Hall	W 82–52	23–6 (16–4)	28 – Bascoe	8 – McCurry	7 – Bascoe	Walsh Gymnasium (1,262); South Orange, NJ
Big East tournament
March 7, 2026; 7:00 p.m., Peacock	(2)	vs. (7) Providence; Quarterfinals	W 73–65	24–6	31 – Bascoe	12 – Henry	4 – Watson	Mohegan Sun Arena; Uncasville, CT
March 8, 2026; 4:00 p.m., Peacock	(2)	vs. (3) Seton Hall; Semifinals	W 62–48	25–6	16 – McCurry	7 – Carter	5 – Henry	Mohegan Sun Arena; Uncasville, CT
March 9, 2026; 7:00 p.m., Peacock	(2)	vs. (1) No. 1 UConn; Finals	L 51–90	25–7	14 – Bascoe	7 – Henry	3 – Henry	Mohegan Sun Arena; Uncasville, CT
NCAA tournament
March 20, 2026*; 8:30 p.m., ESPNU	(10 S2)	vs. (7 S2) No. 25 Texas Tech; First Round	L 52–57	25–8	21 – Bascoe	9 – McCurry	6 – Bascoe	Pete Maravich Assembly Center; Baton Rouge, LA
*Non-conference game. ^{#}Rankings from AP poll. (#) Tournament seedings in parentheses. S2=Sacramento 2. All times are in Eastern.

== Rankings ==
Ranking movements Legend: ██ Increase in ranking ██ Decrease in ranking — = Not ranked RV = Received votes
	Week																				
Poll	Pre	1	2	3	4	5	6	7	8	9	10	11	12	13	14	15	16	17	18	19	Final
AP	—	—	—	—	—	—	—	—	—	—	—	—	—	—	—	—	RV	RV	RV	RV	
Coaches	—	—	—	—	—	—	—	—	—	—	—	—	—	—	—	—	—	—	RV	RV	

== See also ==
- 2025–26 Villanova Wildcats men's basketball team
- Villanova Wildcats at ESPN.com
