= 2012–13 BYU Cougars women's basketball team =

Intercollegiate basketball season

2012–13 BYU Cougars women's basketball

WNIT, 3rd Round
- Conference: West Coast Conference
- Record: 23–11 (11–5 WCC)
- Head coach: Jeff Judkins (12th season)
- Assistant coaches: Chris Boettcher; Melinda Bendall; Ray Stewart
- Home arena: Marriott Center

2012–13 West Coast Conference Women's basketball standings
	Conf.				Overall
Team	W		L	PCT	W		L	PCT
Gonzaga†	15	–	1	.938	27	–	6	.818
San Diego	12	–	4	.750	22	–	10	.688
Saint Mary's	11	–	5	.688	23	–	10	.697
BYU	11	–	5	.688	23	–	11	.676
Loyola Marymount	6	–	10	.375	13	–	18	.419
Santa Clara	6	–	10	.375	14	–	16	.467
Portland	5	–	11	.313	11	–	20	.355
San Francisco	4	–	12	.250	12	–	19	.387
Pepperdine	2	–	14	.125	5	–	23	.179
† 2013 West Coast Conference women's basketball tournament winner As of March 27, 2013; Rankings from AP Poll

The 2012–13 BYU Cougars women's basketball team represented Brigham Young University in the 2012–13 college basketball season. It was head coach Jeff Judkins twelfth season at BYU. The Cougars, members of the West Coast Conference, played their home games at the Marriott Center. They finished the season 23–11, 11–5 in conference play, to finish tied for 3rd in the conference. The Cougars advanced to the second round of the 2013 Women's National Invitation Tournament, where they lost to conference foe Saint Mary's. In an unusual event, the leader at Halftime of all 3 BYU/ Saint Mary's meetings would go on to lose the match.

== Before the season ==
=== Departures ===
Name	Number	Pos.	Height	Year	Hometown	Notes
Alexis Kafusi	10	F	6'1"	Junior	Provo, Utah	Cut from team by Coach Judkins
Dani Peterson	32	F	6'1"	Senior	Salt Lake City, Utah	Graduated
Kristen Riley	35	F	6'3"	Senior	San Clemente, California	Graduated

=== Redshirt News ===
The Cougars were bolstered by the news that Haley Steed would be granted a sixth year of eligibility after she missed out on two previous seasons from injuries. Steed missed out on her 2009-2010 season after playing only the season opening game against Portland State and then was given a medical redshirt during the 2010-11 season.

== 2012-13 media ==
=== BYU Radio Sports Network Affiliates ===
Many Lady Cougar games were broadcast live on BYU Radio found nationwide on Dish Network 980, on Sirius XM 143, and online at www.byuradio.org. Ty Brandenburg acted as the voice of the Lady Cougars for games not shown on BYUtv. 16 BYU games weren't available on BYU Radio, but of those 16 games 12 were broadcast on BYUtv. 2 of the remaining 3 games were streamed online live by the home team, and the Pepperdine game was available through Pepperdine's road broadcast. Only the Washington State game had no TV or audio broadcast available.

== Roster ==
2012–13 BYU Cougars women's basketball team
Players
Coaches

Pos.	#	Name	Height	Year	Previous school	Hometown
G	1	Carley Stratton (W)	5 ft 7 in (1.7 m)	Fr	Hurricane	St. George, UT
G	2	Stephanie Rovetti (injured)	5 ft 6 in (1.68 m)	RS So	Reno	Reno, NV
G	3	Ashley Garfield	5 ft 10 in (1.78 m)	So	Morgan	Morgan, UT
G	4	Kim Parker Beeston	5 ft 11 in (1.8 m)	RS Jr	Wasatch	Heber City, UT
C	5	Jennifer Hamson	6 ft 7 in (2.01 m)	Jr	Pleasant Grove	Lindon, UT
G	11	Xojian Harry	5 ft 11 in (1.8 m)	So	Viewmont	Bountiful, UT
G/F	12	Stephanie Vermunt Seaborn	6 ft 0 in (1.83 m)	RS So	Bert Church	Airdrie, UT
G	15	Kylie Maeda	5 ft 5 in (1.65 m)	Fr	'Iolani	Honolulu, HI
G	21	Lexi Eaton (injured)	5 ft 10 in (1.78 m)	So	Springville	Mapleton, UT
G/F	22	Kristine Fuller (redshirt)	5 ft 11 in (1.8 m)	Fr	Palm Harbor University	Crystal Beach, FL
G	23	Makenzi Morrison (redshirt)	5 ft 8 in (1.73 m)	Fr	Alta	Draper, UT
G	30	Kylie Brown (W)	5 ft 7 in (1.7 m)	So	Grangeville	Grangeville, ID
G	33	Haley Steed (C)	5 ft 4 in (1.63 m)	RS Sr	Clearfield	Syracuse, UT
F	34	Micaelee Orton (redshirt)	6 ft 2 in (1.88 m)	Fr	Kearns	Kearns, UT
F	41	Morgan Bailey	6 ft 2 in (1.88 m)	RS So	Timpanogos	Orem, UT
F	45	Keilani Unga (C)	6 ft 2 in (1.88 m)	Sr	Wheaton-Warrenville	Warrenville, IL
F	50	Brooke Romney	6 ft 1 in (1.85 m)	Fr	Dallas; American School Foundation of Monterrey	Dallas, TX

Head coach

- Jeff Judkins (Utah)

Assistant coach(es)

- Chris Boettcher (BYU)
- Melinda Bendall (BYU)
- Ray Stewart (Utah Valley)

Legend

- (C) Team captain
- (S) Suspended
- (I) Ineligible
- (W) Walk-on
- Injured
- Current redshirt

== Schedule and results ==
Date time, TV	Rank^{#}	Opponent^{#}	Result	Record	Site city, state
Exhibition
11/01/2012*; 7:00 pm, BYUtv		Chadron State	W 89–51	-	Marriott Center; Provo, UT
11/02/2012*; 7:00 pm, BYUtv		Dixie State	W 79–57	-	Marriott Center; Provo, UT
Non-conference Regular Season
11/09/2012*; 3:00 pm, BYUtv		Weber State	W 80–55	1–0	Marriott Center; Provo, UT
11/13/2012*; 3:00 pm, Big Green Insider		at Dartmouth	W 58–57	2–0	Leede Arena; Hanover, NH
11/15/2012*; 5:00 pm, BC All Access		at Boston College	L 56–62	2–1	Conte Forum; Chestnut Hill, MA
11/16/2012*; 3:00 pm, Harvard on Stretch		at Harvard	L 65–71	2–2	Lavietes Pavilion; Boston, MA
11/20/2012*; 11:00 am, Arizona on Pac-12 Digital		at Arizona	W 62–48	3–2	McKale Center; Tempe, AZ
11/24/2012*; 4:00 pm		at Washington State	L 52–67	3–3	Bohler Gymnasium; Pullman, WA
11/28/2012*; 3:00 pm, BYUtv		vs. Creighton	L 62–65 ^{OT}	3–4	EnergySolutions Arena; Salt Lake City, UT
12/04/2012*; 7:00 pm, BYUtv		Utah State	W 81–77	4–4	Marriott Center; Provo, UT
12/08/2012*; 3:00 pm, Utah on Pac-12 Digital		at Utah; Deseret First Duel	W 53–48	5–4	Huntsman Center; Salt Lake City, UT
12/15/2012*; 2:00 pm, BYUtv		Tulsa	W 70–48	6–4	Marriott Center; Provo, UT
12/18/2012*; 2:00 pm, BYUtv		UC Santa Barbara	W 67–39	7–4	Marriott Center; Provo, UT
12/20/2012*; 3:00 pm, BYUtv		Seattle	W 70–62	8–4	Marriott Center; Provo, UT
12/29/2012*; 4:00 pm, BYUtv		Western New Mexico	W 72–31	9–4	Marriott Center; Provo, UT
WCC Regular Season
01/05/2013; 2:00 pm, BYUtv		San Francisco	W 80–58	10–4 (1–0)	Marriott Center; Provo, UT
01/10/2013; 8:00 pm, USD on Stretch		at San Diego	W 57–54 ^{OT}	11–4 (2–0)	Jenny Craig Pavilion; San Diego, CA
01/12/2013; 2:00 pm		Pepperdine	W 68–42	12–4 (3–0)	Marriott Center; Provo, UT
01/17/2013; 7:00 pm, SWX		at Gonzaga	L 59–74	12–5 (3–1)	McCarthey Athletic Center; Spokane, WA
01/24/2013; 7:00 pm, BYUtv		Loyola Marymount	W 72–53	13–5 (4–1)	Marriott Center; Provo, UT
01/26/2013; 2:00 pm, USF on Stretch		at San Francisco	L 56–65	13–6 (4–2)	War Memorial Gymnasium; San Francisco, CA
01/31/2013; 7:00 pm, BYUtv		Saint Mary's	W 66–58	14–6 (5–2)	Marriott Center; Provo, UT
02/02/2013; 3:00 pm, Santa Clara on Stretch		at Santa Clara	W 65–48	15–6 (6–2)	Leavey Center; Santa Clara, CA
02/07/2013; 6:00 pm, BYUtv		San Diego	W 53–48	16–6 (7–2)	Marriott Center; Provo, UT
02/09/2013; 3:00 pm, Gaels Insider		at Saint Mary's	L 52–64	16–7 (7–3)	McKeon Pavilion; Moraga, CA
02/14/2013; 7:00 pm, BYUtv		Santa Clara	W 65–42	17–7 (8–3)	Marriott Center; Provo, UT
02/16/2013; 3:00 pm, TV-32		at Pepperdine	W 67–44	18–7 (9–3)	Firestone Fieldhouse; Malibu, CA
02/21/2013; 7:00 pm, BYUtv		Portland	W 79–64	19–7 (10–3)	Marriott Center; Provo, UT
02/23/2013; 2:00 pm, BYUtv		Gonzaga	L 55–66	19–8 (10–4)	Marriott Center; Provo, UT
02/28/2013; 8:00 pm, LMU All Access		at Loyola Marymount	L 55–68	19–9 (10–5)	Gersten Pavilion; Los Angeles, CA
03/02/2013; 3:00 pm, Portland on Stretch		at Portland	W 73–63	20–9 (11–5)	Chiles Center; Portland, OR
2013 West Coast Conference women's basketball tournament
03/08/2013; 1:00 pm, BYUtv/ WCC Digital		vs. Loyola Marymount; WCC Tournament Quarterfinals	W 69–57	21–9	Orleans Arena; Las Vegas, NV
03/08/2013; 1:00 pm, BYUtv/ WCC Digital		vs. Gonzaga; WCC Tournament Semifinals	L 43–62	21–10	Orleans Arena; Las Vegas, NV
2013 Women's National Invitation Tournament
03/20/2013*; 7:00 pm, BYUtv		Idaho State; WNIT Tournament 1st Round	W 69–54	22–10	Marriott Center; Provo, UT
03/23/2013*; 2:00 pm, BYUtv		San Diego State; WNIT Tournament 2nd Round	W 69–58	23–10	Marriott Center; Provo, UT
03/27/2013; 3:00 pm, BYUtv		Saint Mary's; WNIT Tournament 3rd Round	L 55–59	23–11	Marriott Center; Provo, UT
*Non-conference game. ^{#}Rankings from AP Poll / Coaches' Poll. (#) Tournament seedings in parentheses.

== Game summaries ==
=== Chadron State ===
Series History: First Meeting
Broadcasters: Robbie Bullough, Kristen Kozlowski, and Kory Aldous

BYUtv

Nov 1
7:00 pm MST

Recap

Chadron State Eagles 51, BYU Cougars 89
Scoring by half: 25-49, 26-40
Pts: Dallas Shaw 17; Rebs: Jazmin Lopez 9 Asts: Jazmin Lopez 2	Pts: Ashley Garfield 15; Rebs: Ashley Garfield 10; Asts: Haley Steed 7

Marriott Center
Provo, UT
Attendance: 230
Referees: Steve Belnap, Tiffany Bird, and Shelly Nakasone

=== Dixie State ===
Series History: BYU leads regular season series 1-0
Broadcasters: Robbie Bullough, Kristen Kozlowski, and Shaun Gordon

BYUtv

Nov 2
7:00 pm MST

Recap

Dixie State Red Storm 57, BYU Cougars 79
Scoring by half: 32-43, 25-36
Pts: Erica Hayes 16; Rebs: Kaylah Miller 6 Asts: Kaylah Miller 4	Pts: Haley Steed 15; Rebs: Morgan Bailey 11; Asts: Haley Steed 7

Marriott Center
Provo, UT
Attendance: 415
Referees: Kyle Bacon, Teresa Turner, and Julie Vanni

=== Weber State ===
Series History: BYU leads series 39-9
Broadcasters: Robbie Bullough, Kristen Kozlowski, and Blake Tillitson

BYUtv

Nov 9
3:00 pm MST

Recap

Weber State Wildcats 55, BYU Cougars 80
Scoring by half: 25-42, 30-38
Pts: Regina Okoye 14; Rebs: Kalie Matthews 12; Asts: Desiree Ramos 8	Pts: Lexi Eaton 24; Rebs: Morgan Bailey & Kim Beeston 7 Asts: Haley Steed 9

Marriott Center
Provo, UT
Attendance: 1,120
Referees: Darren Krzesnik, Tiffany Bird, and Lucy Banuelos

=== At Dartmouth ===
Series History: First meeting
Broadcasters: Brett Franklin (Big Green Insider)/ Ty Brandenburg (BYU Radio)

Big Green Insider

Nov 13
5:00 pm EST

Recap

BYU Cougars 58, Dartmouth Big Green 57
Scoring by half: 31-27, 27-30
Pts: Lexi Eaton 19; Rebs: Morgan Bailey 10; Asts: Haley Steed 6	Pts: Faziah Steen 18; Rebs: Abbey Schmitt, Tia Dawson, & Nicola Zimmer 6 Asts: Faziah Steen 2

Leede Arena
Hanover, MA
Attendance: 642
Referees: Pastor Torres, Fatou Cissoko-Stephens, and Keith Miller

=== At Boston College ===
Series History: First Meeting
Broadcasters: Ty Brandenburg (BYU Radio)

BC All Access

Nov 15
7:00 pm EST

Recap

BYU Cougars 56, Boston College Eagles 62
Scoring by half: 24-21, 32-41
Pts: Lexi Eaton 17; Rebs: Keilani Unga 9 Asts: Haley Steed 5	Pts: Katie Zenevitch 16; Rebs: Katie Zenevitch 12; Asts: Kristen Doherty & Tiffany Ruffin 3

Conte Forum
Chestnut Hill, MA
Attendance: 670
Referees: Denise Brooks, Carla Fountain, and Bruce Morris

=== At Harvard ===
Series History: BYU leads series 1-0
Broadcasters: Greg Kadetsky and Helen Williams (Harvard on Stretch)/ Ty Brandenburg (BYU Radio)

Harvard on Stretch

Nov 16
5:00 pm EST

Recap

BYU Cougars 65, Harvard Crimson 71
Scoring by half: 34-29, 31-42
Pts: Kim Beeston 19; Rebs: Kim Beeston 6 Asts: Haley Steed 8	Pts: Christine Clark 18; Rebs: Victoria Lippert 10; Asts: Christine Clark 4

Lavietes Pavilion
Boston, MA
Attendance: 631
Referees: John Palermo, Geraldine Smith, and Ricky Wilcox

=== At Arizona ===
Series History: BYU leads series 6-5
Broadcasters: Derrick Palmer and Lisa Salgado- Arizona on Pac-12 Digital/ Ty Brandenburg (BYU Radio)

Arizona on Pac-12 Digital

Nov 20
11:00 am MST

Recap

BYU Cougars 62, Arizona Wildcats 48
Scoring by half: 28-21, 34-27
Pts: Jennifer Hamson 23; Rebs: Jennifer Hamson 14; Asts: Haley Steed 8	Pts: Davellyn Whyte 12; Rebs: Erica Barnes 7 Asts: Carissa Crutchfield 4

McKale Center
Tempe, AZ
Attendance: 3,375
Referees: Michael Price, Michol Murray, Alejandro Moreno

=== At Washington State ===
Series History: BYU leads series 4-3

Nov 24
3:00 pm PST

Recap

BYU Cougars 52, Washington State Cougars 67
Scoring by half: 24-41, 28-26
Pts: Lexi Eaton 13; Rebs: Kim Beeston 8 Asts: Haley Steed 4	Pts: Lia Galdeira 15; Rebs: Sage Romberg 9 Asts: Tia Presley 7

Bohler Gymnasium
Pullman, WA
Attendance: N/A
Referees: Charles Gonzales, Shelley Russi, Benny Luna

=== Creighton ===
Series History: Creighton leads series 6-5
Broadcasters: Robbie Bullough, Kristen Kozlowski, and Kory Aldous

BYUtv

Nov 28
3:00 pm MST

Recap

Creighton Bluejays 65, BYU Cougars 62 (OT)
Scoring by half: 19-35, 37-21 Overtime: 9-6
Pts: Marissa Janning 19; Rebs: Sarah Nelson 10; Asts: Sarah Nelson 5	Pts: Lexi Eaton 18; Rebs: Lexi Eaton 9 Asts: Haley Steed 12

EnergySolutions Arena
Salt Lake City, UT
Attendance: 325
Referees: Brenda Pentoja, Michol Murray, Kim Mains

=== Utah State ===
Series History: BYU leads series 30-3
Broadcasters: Robbie Bullough, Kristen Kozlowski, and Blake Tillitson

BYUtv

Dec 4
7:05 pm MST

Recap

Utah State Aggies 77, BYU Cougars 81
Scoring by half: 31-39, 46-42
Pts: Jenna Johnson 18; Rebs: Makenleee Williams 6 Asts: Jennifer Scholtt, Kenna Johnson, and Pualei Furtardo 3	Pts: Haley Steed 22; Rebs: Ashley Garfield 16; Asts: Haley Steed 12

Marriott Center
Provo, UT
Attendance: 449
Referees: Michael Greenstein, Tony Padilla, Klaus Endrissat

=== At Utah ===
Series History: Utah leads the series 61-39
Broadcaster: Ty Brandenburg (BYU Radio)

Utah on Pac-12 Digital

Dec 8
3:00 pm MST

Recap

BYU Cougars 53, Utah Utes 48
Scoring by half: 28-21, 25-27
Pts: Haley Steed 22; Rebs: Morgan Bailey 8 Asts: Haley Steed 3	Pts: Michelle Plouffe & Taryn Wicijowski 16; Rebs: Taryn Wicijowski 15; Asts: Iwalani Rodrigues & Danielle Rodriguez 2

Huntsman Center
Salt Lake City, UT
Attendance: 1,925
Referees: Marianne Karp, Anita Ortega, Brian Woods

During the Utah State game BYU's leading scorer, Lexi Eaton, went down with an injury and was unable to return during the game. X-Rays were done a couple of days later, and Eaton was diagnosed with an ACL tear, ending Eaton's season. The good news for the Cougars is Jennifer Hamson returned to the BYU women's basketball team during the Utah game after the volleyball team's season ended with a Sweet Sixteen loss.

=== Tulsa ===
Series History: BYU leads series 6-0
Broadcasters: Robbie Bullough and Kristen Kozlowski

BYUtv

Dec 15
2:00 pm MST

Recap

Tulsa Golden Hurricane 48, BYU Cougars 70
Scoring by half: 22-32, 26-38
Pts: Mariah Turner 10; Rebs: Loren McDaniel 13; Asts: Taleya Mayberry 4	Pts: Ashley Garfield & Stephanie Seaborn 12; Rebs: Jennifer Hamson 12; Asts: Keilani Unga 4 Jennifer Hamson 5 blocks

Marriott Center
Provo, UT
Attendance: 439
Referees: Penny Davis, Bethany Graves, Paul Patterson

=== UC Santa Barbara ===
Series History: UCSB leads series 4-3
Broadcasters: Robbie Bullough and Kristen Kozlowski

BYUtv

Dec 18
2:00 pm MST

Recap

UC Santa Barbara Gauchos 39, BYU Cougars 67
Scoring by half: 28-38, 19-29
Pts: Sweets Underwood & Angelei Aguirre 8 Rebs: Sweets Underwood 9 Asts: Destini Mason 4	Pts: Jennifer Hamson 16; Rebs: Jennifer Hamson 8 Asts: Haley Steed 11

Marriott Center
Provo, UT
Attendance: 289
Referees: Robert Scofield, Cheryl Flores, Tiffany Jump

=== Seattle ===
Series History: BYU leads series 1-0
Broadcasters: Robbie Bullough and Kristen Kozlowski

BYUtv

Dec 20
3:00 pm MST

Recap

Seattle Redhawks 62, BYU Cougars 70
Scoring by half: 34-30, 28-40
Pts: Sylvia Shephard 14; Rebs: Brenda Adhiambo 6 Asts: Brenda Adhiambo 4	Pts: Haley Steed 18; Rebs: Jennifer Hamson & Kim Beeston 5 Asts: Haley Steed 7

Marriott Center
Provo, UT
Attendance: 425
Referees: Rick Showers, Lorena Ahumada, Alex Carroll

=== Western New Mexico ===
Series History: BYU leads series 1-0
Broadcasters: Robbie Bullough, Kristen Kozlowski, and Shaun Gordon

BYUtv

Dec 29
4:00 pm MST

Recap

Western New Mexico Mustangs 31, BYU Cougars 72
Scoring by half: 15-45, 16-27
Pts: Morgan Wohltman 17; Rebs: Jelesia Gray 7 Asts: Larissa Loera 4	Pts: Morgan Bailey 15; Rebs: Jennifer Hamson 9 Asts: Haley Steed 9

Marriott Center
Provo, UT
Attendance: 787
Referees: Michol Murray, Benny Luna, L. Renee Robinson

=== San Francisco ===
Series History: BYU leads series 7-1
Broadcasters: Robbie Bullough, Kristen Kozlowski, and Shaun Gordon

BYUtv

Jan 5
2:00 pm MST

Recap

San Francisco Dons 58, BYU Cougars 80
Scoring by half: 22-34, 36-46
Pts: Denae Williams 12; Rebs: Taj Winston & Taylor Proctor 5 Asts: Zhane Dikes 3	Pts: Ashley Garfield & Morgan Bailey 14; Rebs: Morgan Bailey 13; Asts: Kim Beeston & Haley Steed 8

Marriott Center
Provo, UT
Attendance: 719
Referees: Marianne Karp, Rick Showers, Steve Belnap

=== At San Diego ===
Series History: BYU leads series 4-0
Broadcaster: Paula Bott (USD on Stretch)

USD on Stretch

Jan 10
8:05 pm MST

Recap

BYU Cougars 57, San Diego Toreros 54 (OT)
Scoring by half: 25-21, 24-28 Overtime: 8-5
Pts: Stephanie Seaborn 16; Rebs: Jennifer Hamson 9 Asts: Haley Steed 10	Pts: Amy Kame 25; Rebs: Amy Kame & Klara Wischer 8 Asts: Alysse Barlow 4

The Slim Gym
San Diego, CA
Attendance: 352
Referees: Cathi Cornell, Karen Lasuik, Mazetta Garrett

=== Pepperdine ===
Series History: BYU leads series 3-2
Broadcaster: Nick Law (Pepperdine on Stretch)

Jan 12
2:00 pm MST

Recap

Pepperdine Waves 42, BYU Cougars 68
Scoring by half: 20-30, 22-38
Pts: Kelsey Patrick 11; Rebs: Kelsey Brockway 6 Asts: Ea Shoushtari, Shay Cooney-Williams, & Kelsey Patrick 2	Pts: Kim Beeston 15; Rebs: Jennifer Hamson 9 Asts: Haley Steed 9

Marriott Center
Provo, UT
Attendance: 784
Referees: Wanda Szeremeta, Lucy Banuelos, Shelly Nakasone

=== At Gonzaga ===
Series History: BYU leads series 5-4
Broadcasters: Sam Adams and Stephanie Hawk Freeman (SWX)/ Ty Brandenburg (BYU Radio)

SWX

Jan 17
7:00 pm MST

Recap

BYU Cougars 59, Gonzaga Bulldogs 74
Scoring by half: 19-37, 40-37
Pts: Haley Steed & Morgan Bailey 18; Rebs: Ashley Garfield 7 Asts: Haley Steed 5	Pts: Sunny Greinacher 17; Rebs: Shelby Cheslek 8 Asts: Taelor Karr 7

The Kennel
Spokane, WA
Attendance: 6,000
Referees: Rick Showers, Bart Baldwin, Brian Woods

=== Loyola Marymount ===
Series History: BYU leads series 4-0
Broadcasters: Robbie Bullough, Kristen Kozlowski, and Skyler Hardman

BYUtv

Jan 24
7:00 pm MST

Recap

Loyola Marymount Lions 53, BYU Cougars 72
Scoring by half: 34-46, 19-26
Pts: Alex Cowling 4 Rebs: Sophie Taylor 4 Asts: Hazel Ramirez 5	Pts: Kim Beeston 15; Rebs: Kim Beeston 9 Asts: Haley Steed 13

Marriott Center
Provo, UT
Attendance: 854
Referees: Kyle Bacon, Mary Whatford, Lorena Ahumada

=== At San Francisco ===
Series History: BYU leads series 8-1
Broadcasters: George Devine (USF on Stretch)/ Ty Brandenburg (BYU Radio)

USF on Stretch

Jan 26
3:00 pm MST

Recap

BYU Cougars 56, San Francisco Dons 65
Scoring by half: 17-33, 39-32
Pts: Haley Steed 19; Rebs: Ashley Garfield 8 Asts: Ashley Garfield & Haley Steed 3	Pts: Zhane Dikes 19; Rebs: Taylor Proctor 8 Asts: Mel Kholk 5

The Hilltop
San Francisco, CA
Attendance: 557
Referees: Anita Ortega, Brenda Pantoja, Kevin Slorey

=== Saint Mary's ===
Series History: Series even 1-1
Broadcasters: Robbie Bullough, Kristen Kozlowski, and Skyler Hardman

BYUtv

Jan 31
7:00 pm MST

Recap

St. Mary's Gaels 58, BYU Cougars 66
Scoring by half: 35-32, 23-34
Pts: Jackie Nared 18; Rebs: Jackie Nared 11; Asts: Kate Gaze 4	Pts: Kim Beeston and Haley Steed 14; Rebs: Jennifer Hamson 8 Asts: Haley Steed 9

Marriott Center
Provo, UT
Attendance: 682
Referees: Melissa Barlow, Bart Baldwin, In'Fini Robinson

=== At Santa Clara ===
Series History: BYU leads series 4-1
Broadcasters: John Nash (Santa Clara on Stretch)/ Ty Brandenburg (BYU Radio)

Santa Clara on Stretch

Feb 2
3:00 pm MST

Recap

BYU Cougars 65, Santa Clara Broncos 48
Scoring by half: 30-17, 35-31
Pts: Haley Steed 17; Rebs: Keilani Unga 7 Asts: Haley Steed 6	Pts: Ruta Zurauskyte 10; Rebs: Ruta Zurauskyte 10; Asts: Meagan Fulps 4

Leavey Center
Santa Clara, CA
Attendance: N/A
Referees: Penny Davis, Cheryl Flores, Richard Waters

=== San Diego ===
Series History: BYU leads series 5-0
Broadcasters: Robbie Bullough, Kristen Kozlowski, and Skyler Hardman

BYUtv

Feb 7
6:00 pm MST

Recap

San Diego Toreros 48, BYU Cougars 53
Scoring by half: 22-20, 26-33
Pts: Amy Kame 18; Rebs: Klara Wischer 9 Asts: Amy Kame 5	Pts: Keilani Unga 17; Rebs: Morgan Bailey 8 Asts: Haley Steed 7

Marriott Center
Provo, UT
Attendance: 528
Referees: Darren Krzesnik, Tiffany Bird, Lisa Ulmer

=== At Saint Mary's ===
Series History: BYU leads series 2-1
Broadcasters: Elias Feldman (Gaels Insider)/ Ty Brandenburg (BYU Radio)

Gaels Insider

Feb 9
3:00 pm MST

Recap

BYU Cougars 52, St. Mary's Gaels 64
Scoring by half: 30-28, 22-36
Pts: Haley Steed 18; Rebs: Kim Beeston 7 Asts: Haley Steed 7	Pts: Danielle Mauldin 12; Rebs: Danielle Mauldin 10; Asts: Morgan Hatten 6

McKeon Pavilion
Moraga, CA
Attendance: 562
Referees: Darren Krzesnik, Mary Whatford, Brian Woods

=== Santa Clara ===
Series History: BYU leads series 5-1
Broadcasters: Robbie Bullough, Kristen Kozlowski, and Jake Edmonds

BYUtv

Feb 14
7:00 pm MST

Recap

Santa Clara Broncos 42, BYU Cougars 65
Scoring by half: 14-19, 28-46
Pts: Nici Gilday 10; Rebs: Ruta Zurauskyte 6 Asts: Raquel Avila 3	Pts: Jennifer Hamson 12; Rebs: Jennifer Hamson 16; Asts: Haley Steed 10

Marriott Center
Provo, UT
Attendance: 617
Referees: Teresa Turner, Karen Lasuik, Alejandro Moreno

=== At Pepperdine ===
Series History: BYU leads series 4-2
Broadcasters: Nick Law (TV-32)/ Ty Brandenburg (BYU Radio)

TV-32

Feb 16
3:00 pm MST

Recap

BYU Cougars 67, Pepperdine Waves 44
Scoring by half: 25-24, 42-20
Pts: Kim Beeston 16; Rebs: Kim Beeston, Jennifer Hamson, & Keliani Unga 9 Asts: Haley Steed 7	Pts: Kelsey Brockway 10; Rebs: Kelsey Patrick 5 Asts: Ea Shoushtari & Keitra Wallace 2

Firestone Fieldhouse
Malibu, CA
Attendance: 212
Referees: Robert Scofield, Michelle Russi, Kenenth Nash

=== Portland ===
Series History: BYU leads series 10-4
Broadcasters: Robbie Bullough, Kristen Kozlowski, and Jen Benson

BYUtv

Feb 21
7:00 pm MST

Recap

Portland Pilots 64, BYU Cougars 79
Scoring by half: 18-33, 46-46
Pts: Annika Holopainen 15; Rebs: Jasmine Wooton 6 Asts: Jasmine Wooton 4	Pts: Jennifer Hamson & Haley Steed 23; Rebs: Jennifer Hamson 8 Asts: Haley Steed 9 Jeff Judkins 250th career win

Marriott Center
Provo, UT
Attendance: 664
Referees: Charles Gonzalez, Kyle Bacon, Tiffany Jump

=== Gonzaga ===
Series History: Series even 5-5
Broadcasters: Robbie Bullough, Kristen Kozlowski, and Skyler Hardman

BYUtv

Feb 23
2:00 pm MST

Recap

Gonzaga Bulldogs 66, BYU Cougars 55
Scoring by half: 30-25, 36-30
Pts: Stephanie Golden 16; Rebs: Haiden Palmer 9 Asts: Jazmine Redmond 6	Pts: Jennifer Hamson 20; Rebs: Jennifer Hamson 8 Asts: Haley Steed 9

Marriott Center
Provo, UT
Attendance: 1,430
Referees: Anita Ortega, Michol Murray, Bart Baldwin

=== At Loyola Marymount ===
Series History: BYU leads series 5-0
Broadcaster: Patrick Duggan

LMU All Access

Feb 28
8:00 pm MST

Recap

BYU Cougars 55, Loyola Marymount Lions 68
Scoring by half: 39-33, 16-35
Pts: Stephanie Seaborn 16; Rebs: Jennifer Hamson 11; Asts: Stephanie Seaborn 6	Pts: Deanna Johnson 24; Rebs: Chelsea Barnes 12; Asts: Dani Lenior & Alex Cowling 3

Gersten Pavilion
Los Angeles, CA
Attendance: 587
Referees: Cathi Cornell, Jay Schumaker, Cheryll Blue

=== At Portland ===
Series History: BYU leads series 11-4
Broadcasters: Sarah Griffin and Cody Barton (Portland on Stretch)/ Ty Brandenburg (BYU Radio)

Portland on Stretch

Mar 2
3:00 pm MST

Recap

BYU Cougars 73, Portland Pilots 63
Scoring by half: 34-33, 39-30
Pts: Kim Beeston 17; Rebs: Jennifer Hamson 9 Asts: Haley Steed 8	Pts: Cassandra Thompson 12; Rebs: Alexis Byrd 7 Asts: Alexis Byrd 5

Chiles Center
Portland, OR
Attendance: 563
Referees: Robert Scofield, Rick Showers, Michelle Russi

=== WCC Quarterfinal: vs. Loyola Marymount ===
Series History: BYU leads series 5-1
Broadcasters: Dave McCann and Blaine Fowler (Play-by-play); Steve Cleveland and Jarom Jordan (Halftime); Steve Cleveland, Blaine Fowler, and Jarom Jordan (Bridge Show)

BYUtv

Mar 8
1:00 pm MST

Loyola Marymount Lions 57, BYU Cougars 69
Scoring by half: 26-35, 31-34
Pts: Alex Cowling 17; Rebs: Alex Cowling 8 Asts: Dani LeNoir 5	Pts: Stephanie Seaborn 21; Rebs: Jennifer Hamson 12; Asts: Haley Steed 5

Orleans Arena
Paradise, NV
Attendance: 7,896
Referees: Shelley Russi, Karen Lasuik, Brian Woods

=== WCC Semifinal: vs. Gonzaga ===
Series History: Gonzaga leads series 6-5
Broadcasters: Dave McCann, Steve Cleveland, and Jarom Jordan

BYUtv

Mar 9
12:00 pm PST

BYU Cougars 43, Gonzaga Bulldogs 62
Scoring by half: 19-30, 24-32
Pts: Morgan Bailey 12; Rebs: Haley Steed & Keilani Unga 7 Asts: Haley Steed 3	Pts: Shelby Cheslek 16; Rebs: Shelby Cheslek 8 Asts: Jazmine Redmon 5

Orleans Arena
Las Vegas, NV
Attendance: 7,896
Referees: Michol Murray, Cathi Cornell, Kyle Bacon

=== WNIT 1st Round: Idaho State ===
Series History: BYU leads series 11-3
Broadcasters: Robbie Bullough, Kristen Kozlowski, and Andy Boyce

BYUtv

Mar 20
7:00 pm MDT

Recap

Idaho State Bengals 54, BYU Cougars 69
Scoring by half: 27-34, 27-35
Pts: Ashleigh Vella 15; Rebs: Jessa Jeppesen 8 Asts: Kara Jenkins 5	Pts: Jennifer Hamson 25; Rebs: Jennifer Hamson 12; Asts: Haley Steed 9

Marriott Center
Provo, UT
Attendance: 459
Referees: Tiffany Bird, Teresa Turner, Rick Thorne

=== WNIT 2nd Round: San Diego State ===
Series History: BYU leads series 28-13
Broadcasters: Dave McCann, Kristen Kozlowski, and Robbie Bullough

BYUtv

Mar 23
2:00 pm MDT

Recap

San Diego State Aztecs 58, BYU Cougars 69
Scoring by half: 26-28, 32-41
Pts: Chelsea Hopkins 17; Rebs: Erimma Amarikwa 6 Asts: Chelsea Hopkins 6	Pts: Kim Parker Beeston 17; Rebs: Jennifer Hamson 17; Asts: Haley Steed 6

Marriott Center
Provo, UT
Attendance: 470
Referees: Steve Belnap, Rigo Vasquez, Ashley Ellis

=== WNIT 3rd Round: Saint Mary's ===
Series History: Series even 2-2
Broadcasters: Robbie Bullough, Kristen Kozlowski, and Andy Boyce

BYUtv

Mar 27
3:00 pm MDT

Recap

Saint Mary's Gaels 59, BYU Cougars 55
Scoring by half: 22-26, 37-29
Pts: Danielle Mauldin 18; Rebs: Carli Rosenthal 10; Asts: Kate Gaze 8	Pts: Jennifer Hamson 12; Rebs: Jennifer Hamson 12; Asts: Haley Steed 9

Marriott Center
Provo, UT
Attendance: 449
Referees: Tiffany Bird, Rick Thorne, Teresa Turner

== Rankings ==
+ Regular season polls	Poll	Pre- Season	Week 1	Week 2	Week 3	Week 4	Week 5	Week 6	Week 7	Week 8	Week 9	Week 10	Week 11	Week 12	Week 13	Week 14	Week 15	Week 16	Week 17	Week 18	Final
AP	NR	NR	NR	NR	NR	NR	NR	NR	NR	NR	NR	NR	NR	NR	NR	NR	NR	NR			
Coaches	RV	RV	NR	NR	NR	NR	NR	NR	NR	NR	NR	NR	NR	NR	NR	NR	NR	NR			

Legend
	Increase in ranking
	Decrease in ranking
	No change
(RV)	Received votes
(NR)	Not ranked

== See also ==
- BYU Cougars women's basketball
