= 2013 CAA women's basketball tournament =

Basketball tournament

- Classification: Division I
- Season: 2012–13
- Teams: 9
- Site: Show Place Arena; Upper Marlboro, Maryland
- Champions: Delaware (2nd title)
- Winning coach: Tina Martin (2nd title)
- CAA women's basketball tournaments

2012–13 CAA women's basketball standings
	Conf.				Overall
Team	W		L	PCT	W		L	PCT
No. 15 Delaware†	18	–	0	1.000	32	–	4	.889
James Madison	15	–	3	.833	25	–	11	.694
Drexel	13	–	5	.722	28	–	10	.737
Northeastern	10	–	8	.556	17	–	13	.567
Old Dominion	10	–	8	.556	19	–	12	.613
Hofstra	9	–	9	.500	14	–	17	.452
Towson	6	–	12	.333	12	–	18	.400
William & Mary	6	–	12	.333	8	–	22	.267
Georgia State	5	–	13	.278	13	–	16	.448
George Mason	4	–	14	.222	9	–	21	.300
UNC Wilmington	3	–	15	.167	5	–	26	.161
† 2013 CAA tournament winner Rankings from AP poll

The 2013 Colonial Athletic Association women's basketball tournament was held March 14–17 at the Show Place Arena in Upper Marlboro, Maryland. Champion University of Delaware received an automatic bid to the 2013 NCAA tournament.

== Schedule ==
Session	Game	Time*	Matchup^{#}	Television
First round – Thursday, March 14, 2014
1	1	2:00 pm	#9 UNC Wilmington vs #8 George Mason	CAA.TV
Quarterfinals – Friday, March 15, 2014
2	2	12:00 pm	#9 UNC Wilmington vs #1 Delaware	CAA.TV
2	3	2:30 pm	#5 Hofstra vs #4 Northeastern	CAA.TV
3	4	5:00 pm	#7 Towson vs #2 James Madison	CAA.TV
3	5	7:30 pm	#6 William & Mary vs #3 Drexel	CAA.TV
Semifinals – Saturday, March 16, 2014
4	6	12:00 pm	#1 Delaware vs #5 Hofstra	NBC Regional
4	7	2:30 pm	#2 James Madison vs #3 Drexel	NBC Regional
Championship – Sunday, March 17, 2014
5	8	12:00 pm	#1 Delaware vs #3 Drexel	NBC Regional
*Game times in ET. #-Rankings denote tournament seed

== Bracket ==
First round Thursday, March 14; CAA.TV
8	George Mason	46
9	UNC Wilmington	60

Quarterfinals; Friday, March 15; CAA.TV
1	Delaware	51
9	UNC Wilmington	43
4	Northeastern	42
5	Hofstra	57
3	Drexel	65
6	William & Mary	31
2	James Madison	59
7	Towson	48

Semifinals; Saturday, March 16; NBC Regional
1	Delaware	75
5	Hofstra	54
3	Drexel	50
2	James Madison	34

Championship; Sunday, March 17; NBC Regional
1	Delaware	59
3	Drexel	56

== See also ==
- 2013 CAA men's basketball tournament
