= George Mason Patriots basketball =

George Mason Patriots basketball may refer to either of the basketball teams that represent George Mason University:

- George Mason Patriots men's basketball
- George Mason Patriots women's basketball
