= 2013 Big Ten women's basketball tournament =

- Classification: Division I
- Season: 2012–13
- Teams: 12
- Site: Sears Centre Arena; Hoffman Estates, Illinois
- Champions: Purdue (9th title)
- Winning coach: Sharon Versyp (4th title)
- Television: BTN and ESPN2

2012–13 Big Ten women's basketball standings
	Conf.				Overall
Team	W		L	PCT	W		L	PCT
No. 8 Penn State	14	–	2	.875	26	–	6	.813
No. 24 Nebraska	12	–	4	.750	25	–	9	.735
Michigan State	10	–	6	.625	25	–	9	.735
No. 21 Purdue †	10	–	6	.625	25	–	9	.735
Michigan	9	–	7	.563	22	–	11	.667
Illinois	9	–	7	.563	19	–	14	.576
Iowa	8	–	8	.500	21	–	13	.618
Minnesota	7	–	9	.438	18	–	14	.563
Ohio State	7	–	9	.438	18	–	13	.581
Northwestern	5	–	11	.313	13	–	17	.433
Wisconsin	3	–	13	.188	12	–	19	.387
Indiana	2	–	14	.125	11	–	19	.367
† 2013 Big Ten tournament winner Rankings from AP poll

The 2013 Big Ten women's basketball tournament was held March 7 through March 12 at the Sears Centre Arena in Hoffman Estates, Illinois. The Big Ten Network carried all games except the championship game which was aired by ESPN2. Purdue won the tournament and received an automatic bid to the 2013 NCAA tournament.

== Seeds ==
All 12 Big Ten schools participated in the tournament. Teams were seeded by 2012–13 Big Ten Conference women's basketball season record. The top four teams received a first round bye.

Seed	School	Conf	Tiebreak 1	Tiebreak 2
#1	Penn State	14–2		
#2	Nebraska	12–4		
#3	Purdue	10–6	1–1 vs. Michigan State	1–0 vs. Nebraska
#4	Michigan State	10–6	1–1 vs. Purdue	0–1 vs. Nebraska
#5	Michigan	9–7	1–0 vs. Illinois	
#6	Illinois	9–7	0–1 vs. Michigan	
#7	Iowa	8–8		
#8	Minnesota	7–9	2–0 vs. Ohio State	
#9	Ohio State	7–9	0–2 vs. Minnesota	
#10	Northwestern	5–11		
#11	Wisconsin	3–13		
#12	Indiana	2–14		

== Schedule ==
Session	Game	Time**	Matchup^{#}	Television	Score
First round - Thursday, March 7
1	1	12:30 pm	#7 Iowa vs. #10 Northwestern	BTN	60–55
1	2	2:30 pm	#6 Illinois vs. #11 Wisconsin	BTN	57–58
2	3	7:00 pm	#8 Minnesota vs. #9 Ohio State	BTN	47–58
2	4	9:30pm	#5 Michigan vs. #12 Indiana	BTN	67–40
Quarterfinals - Friday, March 8
3	5	12:30 pm	#2 Nebraska vs. #7 Iowa	BTN	76–61
3	6	2:30pm	#3 Purdue vs. #11 Wisconsin	BTN	74–62
4	7	7:00 pm	#1 Penn State vs. #9 Ohio State	BTN	76–66
4	8	9:30 pm	#4 Michigan State vs. #5 Michigan	BTN	62–46
Semifinals - Saturday, March 9
5	9	5:00 pm	#2 Nebraska vs. #3 Purdue	BTN	64–77
5	10	7:30pm	#1 Penn State vs. #4 Michigan State	BTN	46–54
Championship Game - Sunday, March 10
6	11	4:00pm	#3 Purdue vs. #4 Michigan State	ESPN2	62–47
*Game Times in ET. #Rankings denote tournament seeding. Source:

== Bracket ==
- All times are Eastern.

First round Thursday, March 7
7	Iowa	60
10	Northwestern	55
6	Illinois	57
11	Wisconsin	58
8	Minnesota	47
9	Ohio State	58
5	Michigan	67
12	Indiana	40

Quarterfinals; Friday, March 8
2	Nebraska	76
7	Iowa	61
3	Purdue	74
11	Wisconsin	62
1	Penn State	76
9	Ohio State	66
4	Michigan State	62
5	Michigan	46

Semifinals; Saturday, March 9
2	Nebraska	64
3	Purdue	77
1	Penn State	46
4	Michigan State	54

Championship game Sunday, March 10
3	Purdue	62
4	Michigan State	47
