= 2013 Women's National Invitation Tournament =

College basketball postseason tournament

- Season: 2012–13
- Teams: 64
- Finals site: Daskalakis Athletic Center, Philadelphia
- Champions: Drexel (1st title)
- Runner-up: Utah (1st title game)
- Semifinalists: Kansas State; Florida
- Winning coach: Denise Dillon (1st title)
- MVP: Hollie Mershon (Drexel)
- Attendance: 1,922 (championship game)

The 2013 Women's National Invitation Tournament was a single-elimination tournament of 64 NCAA Division I teams that were not selected to participate in the 2013 Women's NCAA tournament. The annual tournament began on March 20 and ends on April 6. All games were played on the campus sites of participating schools. It was won by the Drexel Dragons.

== Participants ==
The following 64 teams are the teams selected to participate in the 2013 WNIT. 31 teams have earned automatic berths into the tournament from being the highest-ranked team in their conference that failed to make the NCAA women's tournament. 33 teams earned an at-large bid into the WNIT by having a winning record but failing to make the NCAA Women's Tournament.

=== Automatic qualifiers ===
Conference	School
America East	Boston University
Atlantic 10	Charlotte
ACC	
Atlantic Sun	Florida Gulf Coast
Big 12	Kansas State
Big East	
Big Sky	Northern Colorado
Big South	Winthrop
Big Ten	Illinois
Big West	Pacific
Colonial	James Madison
C-USA	SMU
Horizon	Youngstown State
Ivy League	Harvard
MAAC	Iona
MAC	Toledo
MEAC	North Carolina A&T
Missouri Valley	Illinois State
Mountain West	San Diego State
Northeast	Sacred Heart
Ohio Valley	Eastern Illinois
Pac-12	Washington
Patriot	Army
SEC	Arkansas
Southern	Davidson
Southland	Sam Houston State
SWAC	Texas Southern
Summit	IUPUI
Sun Belt	UALR
WCC	San Diego
WAC	Seattle

=== At-large bids ===
School	Conference
Akron	MAC
Appalachian State	SoCon
Auburn	SEC
Ball State	MAC
Bowling Green	MAC
Butler	A10
BYU	WCC
Drexel	CAA
Duquesne	A10
East Carolina	C-USA
Eastern Washington	Big Sky
FIU	Sun Belt
Florida	SEC
Fordham	A10
Hartford	America East
Hawaii	Big West
Idaho State	Big Sky
Indiana State	MVC
Long Beach State	Big West
Marquette	Big East
Memphis	C-USA
Miami (OH)	MAC
Minnesota	Big Ten
Missouri	SEC
NC State	ACC
Northern Iowa	MVC
Old Dominion	CAA
Richmond	A10
Saint Mary's	WCC
Tulane	C-USA
UAB	C-USA
UCSB	Big West
Utah	Pac 12
Western Kentucky	Sun Belt
Wyoming	Mountain West

== Final Four games ==
Utah faced Kansas State in one semifinal of the WNIT played at Kansas State. Utah appeared to be in control early on, leading 21–7 with eight minutes to go in the first half, and still led by 12, 35 – 23 with just under 14 minutes left to go in the game. Utah scored the 39th point with about 7 1/2 minutes left in the game, but did not score again in regulation; Kansas State scored eight straight to tie the game at 39 points apiece. Despite scored only 13 points in the second half, Utah then scored 15 points in the five minutes of overtime to only 7 for the Wildcats to win the game 54–46 to advance to the championship game. Michelle Plouffe was the leading scorer for Utah with 24 points.

In the other semi final, the Drexel Dragons faced the Florida Gators. The Dragons were behind early but scored 11 consecutive points to take a 10 point lead halfway through the first half. Florida pulled within five points in the second half, Drexel pushed the lead back up to double digits in maintain that lead almost all the rest of the game. Florida could lead to eight points in the final minute but Drexel hung on to win 67–57. Hollie Mershon had a double double with 28 points and 10 assists for Drexel.

In the championship game, Utah pulled out to a slim three point lead at halftime in a low-scoring game 24–21. Drexel reclaimed the lead in the second half, but Utah was up by a single point, 43–42 with less than a minute remaining in the game. Drexel Senior Holly Mershon hit a layup with 22 seconds left in the game to give the Dragons a one point lead. Utah failed to score then fouled Mershon who hit two free throws in the final seconds to seal the win. Mershon ended with 14 points while her teammate Taylor Wootton recorded 16 points including passing the 1000 point mark for her career. The final score was 46–43 giving the 2013 WNIT championship to the Drexel Dragons. Holly Mershon was named the tournament MVP.

== Bracket ==
=== Region 1 ===
First round March 20–22
Washington	65
Eastern Washington	60
Pacific	69
UALR	65
Long Beach St	49
Utah	56
San Diego	61
Hawaii	49
San Diego State	69
UCSB	46
BYU	69
Idaho State	54
Wyoming	63
Northern Colorado	71
St. Mary's	68
Seattle University	51

Second round March 23–25
Washington	78
Pacific	85
Utah	61
San Diego	50
San Diego State	58
BYU	69
Northern Colorado	58
St. Mary's	68

Third round March 27–28
Pacific	55
Utah	60
BYU	55
St. Mary's	59

Fourth Round; March 30
Utah	58
St. Mary's	55

=== Region 2 ===
First round March 20–22
Minnesota	51
Ball State	54
Marquette	59
Northern Iowa	61
Kansas State	72
Texas Southern	44
Illinois State	63
IUPUI	47
Toledo	63
Butler	49
Youngstown State	63
Indiana State	51
Illinois	73
Miami (OH)	60
Missouri	58
Eastern Illinois	60

Second round March 23–25
Ball State	53
Northern Iowa	48
Kansas State	57
Illinois State	48
Toledo	61
Youngstown State	43
Illinois	62
Eastern Illinois	54

Third round March 28
Ball State	48
Kansas State	60
Toledo	55
Illinois	63

Fourth Round; March 30
Kansas State	66
Illinois	48

=== Region 3 ===
First round March 20–22
WKU	88^{OT}
East Carolina	77
Auburn	80
UAB	57
Arkansas	67
Memphis	57
Tulane	65
Sam Houston State	57
Drexel	59
Iona	50
Hartford	57
Harvard	61
Duquesne	71
Akron	66
Bowling Green	76
SMU	70

Second round March 23–25
WKU	66
Auburn	84
Arkansas	48
Tulane	60
Drexel	82
Harvard	72
Bowling Green	61
Duquesne	54

Third round March 27–28
Auburn	72
Tulane	52
Drexel	50
Bowling Green	47

Fourth Round; March 30
Auburn	43
Drexel	56

=== Region 4 ===
First round March 20–22
Boston U	61
Sacred Heart	49
Fordham	55
Army	46
James Madison	77
North Carolina A&T	64
NC State	60
Richmond	55
Old Dominion	73
Davidson	82
Charlotte	79
Appalachian State	61
FGCU	51
Winthrop	65
FIU	68
Florida	75

Second round March 23–25
Boston U	44
Fordham	58
James Madison	72
NC State	66
Davidson	60
Charlotte	72
Winthrop	53
Florida	84

Third round March 27
Fordham	61
James Madison	77
Charlotte	65
Florida	67

Fourth Round; March 30
James Madison	80
Florida	85

=== Semifinals and championship game ===
Played at host schools

Semifinals; April 3
Utah	54^{OT}
Kansas State	46
Drexel	67
Florida	57

Championship Game; April 6
Utah	43
Drexel	46

== All-tournament team ==
- Hollie Mershon, Drexel (MVP)
- Taylor Wootton, Drexel
- Michelle Plouffe, Utah
- Taryn Wicijowski, Utah
- Brittany Chambers, Kansas State
- Sydney Moss, Florida

== See also ==
- 2013 National Invitation Tournament
