= Brian McDonough =

American physician and broadcaster

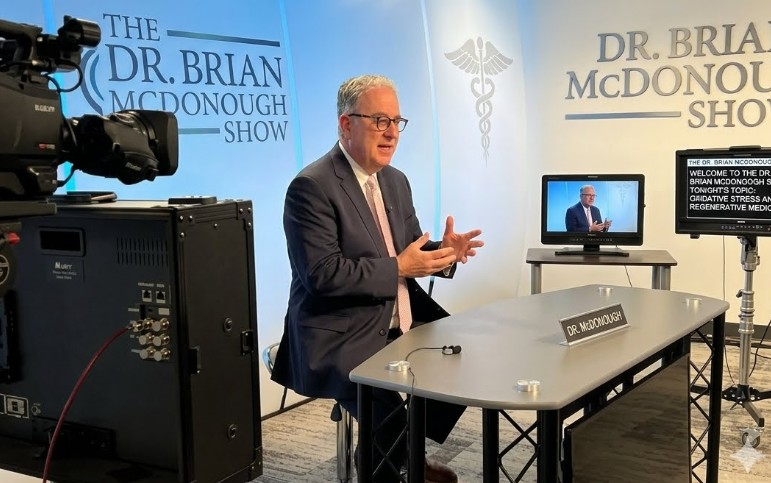
Dr Brian McDonough in studio

Brian McDonough is an American family physician and broadcaster. He has been Medical Editor at KYW Newsradio in Philadelphia since 1988, providing daily reports, and hosts a podcast. A dual citizen of the United States and Ireland, he is a member of the Broadcast Pioneers Hall of Fame.

== Early life and education ==
McDonough attended La Salle University where he graduated as a Biology-English major. During his collegiate years he was a member of the varsity tennis team for four years and served as a two-time captain and was a finalist for a Rhodes Scholarship. Upon graduation he attended Temple University School of Medicine. McDonough completed his residency in Family Medicine at Saint Francis Hospital in Wilmington, Delaware and later completed a fellowship in Faculty Development one year later at Temple. He became a fellow of the American Academy of Family Physicians in 1996, of the American College of Physician Executives in 2006 and of the College of Physicians of Philadelphia in 2007. In 2019 he received a graduate degree in Irish Studies from The University of Galway. McDonough is a dual citizen of The United States and Ireland.

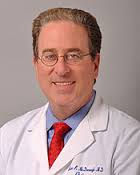

== Career ==
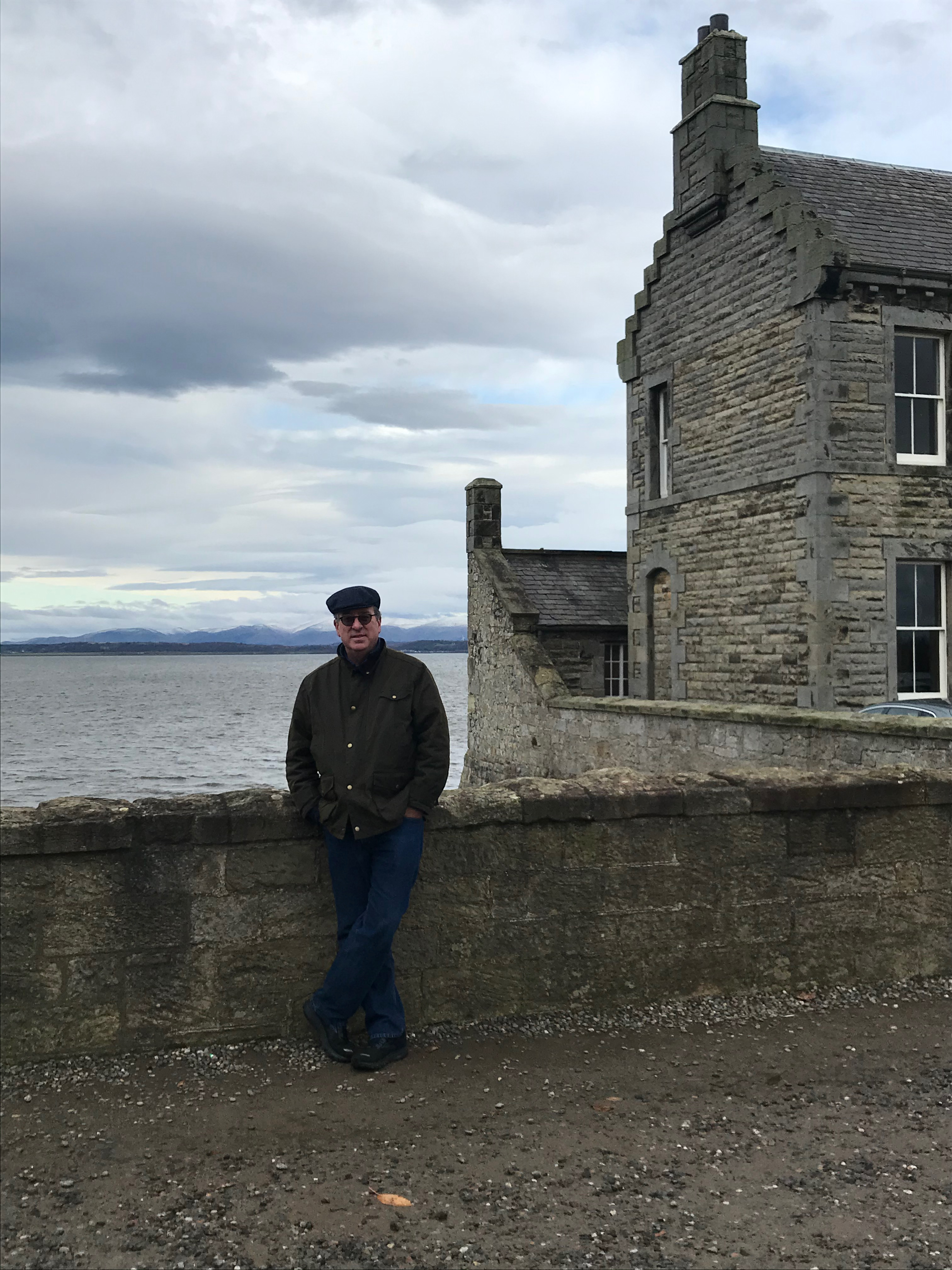

McDonough is Clinical Professor of Family Medicine and Community Health at Temple University Lewis Katz School of Medicine, where he has served since 1988. From 1993 to 1995 he was Acting Vice-Chairman of Family Medicine at Temple. McDonough was Chairman of Family Medicine at St. Francis Hospital (Wilmington) from 2008-2021 before becoming Chairman of The Graduate Medical Education (GMEC) and Designated Institutional Official (DIO) in the Family Medicine Residency Program. McDonough has been a faculty member in the program since 1993. McDonough has published four books, as well as articles for professional publications and the general public. From 2010 to 2016 he served on the Saint Francis Hospital Board of Directors. He holds the Health IT Leadership Certificate and the degree of Certified Physician Executive from The American College of Physician Executives.

McDonough combined his clinical role with the position of Chief Medical Information Officer in 2010. Over a ten-year period he led conversions to both the Meditech and Cerner platforms. In October 2020, McDonough accepted the role of Trinity Health Mid-Atlantic Vice President and Chief Health Informatics Officer and agreed to remain in the role until the regional conversion to Epic. Upon completion of the project in November 2022, McDonough returned to patient education and clinical care. In 2025 he contributed a chapter in the textbook Healthcare Administration. Leadership and Management (Halm): The Essentials. The focus of his chapter is the Health Information Technology Landscape.

=== Broadcasting ===
McDonough worked from 1989 to 2008 for Fox Television (Philadelphia) and in the mid-1990s was a medical correspondent for NBC Today Show. During the Covid-19 pandemic he hosted the podcast "Coronavirus Today" on Spotify and its video counterpart "A Doctor in The Pandemic". In August, 2026, Feedspot ranked it first in its list of pandemic podcasts. In February, 2022 he created a video podcast called "The Dr. Brian McDonough Show", which features long-form interviews with people working in journalism, healthcare and politics. From 2024-2026 it has been ranked by Million Podcasts as a top ten podcast in the area of public health. In 2025 he began hosting "The Convergence", a ReachMD podcast about the use of artificial intelligence in patient care. In 2026, he partnered with AMGA to develop a podcast on medical leadership called "Executive Pulse".

McDonough has received awards as Family Physician of The Year by The Delaware Academy of family Physicians, National Medical Broadcaster of The Year, The Sir William Osler Award for Bedside Teaching, and is an inductee in The Broadcast Pioneers Hall of Fame. In October, 2003, he was awarded an honorary Doctor of Humane Letters by La Salle University. In 2019, McDonough graduated from The University of Galway with a degree in Irish Studies. He is a Fellow of The American Academy of Physician Leadership and is a member of their faculty. In 2025, McDonough was named to the Board of Managers at The Nemours Foundation and presently serves as president-Elect of the Delaware Academy of Family Physicians.

== Personal life ==
McDonough has been married since 1991. He has three children and three grandchildren.
