= Nazareth Academy (Rochester, New York) =

Nazareth Elementary

Location
- 311 Flower City Park; Rochester, (Monroe County), New York 14613; United States; 43°11′3″N 77°37′57″W

Information
- Type: Private, Co-ed
- Motto: Where Faith, Love and Learning Thrive!
- Religious affiliation: Roman Catholic
- Established: 1871
- Principal: Mrs. Mary K. Martell
- Grades: Pre-K–6
- Average class size: classes range anywhere from 12–24 students
- Campus: Urban
- Colors: Blue and Gold
- Nickname: Naz
- Accreditation: Middle States Association of Colleges and Schools
- Website: www.nazarethschools.org

Nazareth Elementary is a ministry of the Sisters of Saint Joseph located in Rochester, NY. Nazareth Elementary serves students from Preschool (beginning at age 3) to Grade 6.

== History ==
Nazareth Academy was founded by the Sisters of Saint Joseph in 1871. It was the oldest Catholic high school in Rochester.

"One chance… often in life we are faced with a defining moment, where the choice we make will help determine our safety, our character, or our future."

== Extracurricular activities ==
=== After School Clubs ===
After-School activities includes:

- 100 Mile Club
- Soccer Skills Club
- Science Club
- First Lego League Robotics
- Extended Care Program (ECP/Afterschool Care)

== Enrichment to Curriculum ==
Nazareth Elementary supports several clubs and organizations, including:

- Junior Achievement
- Student banking with SPX Federal Credit Union

== Associated schools ==
Nazareth Academy was a part of Nazareth Schools, which also included an elementary (Nazareth Hall Elementary and Preschool) and middle school (Nazareth Hall Middle School) that were founded as a boys school in 1884. The original building was constructed in 1915; Nazareth Academy closed in 2010.

== Performance ==
Nazareth Academy was accredited by the Middle States Association of Colleges and Schools, the New York State Board of Regents, and the New York State Association of Independent Schools. It was a member of the Greater Rochester Association of Private Schools.
