= Denise Dillon =

American basketball coach (born 1973)

Current position
- Title: Head coach
- Team: Villanova
- Conference: Big East
- Record: 139–59 (.702)

Biographical details
- Born: September 22, 1973 (age 53)

Playing career
- 1992–1996: Villanova
- Position: Guard

Coaching career (HC unless noted)
- 1997–2001: Villanova (assistant)
- 2001–2003: Drexel (assistant)
- 2003–2020: Drexel
- 2020–present: Villanova

Head coaching record
- Overall: 468–270 (.634)

Accomplishments and honors

Championships
- WNIT (2013); 3 CAA regular season (2009, 2018, 2020); CAA Tournament (2009)

Awards
- 3× CAA Coach of the Year (2005, 2009, 2018, 2019); Big East Coach of the Year (2022)

Denise Dillon (born September 22, 1973) is the head women's basketball coach at Villanova.

== Career ==
She returned to her alma mater from Drexel, where she was the program's most successful coach since it moved to Division I in 1982–83. She had been at the helm of the Dragons program since 2003, and was named the 2005, 2009, 2018, and 2020 CAA Coach of the Year.

Dillon guided the Dragons to the 2009 CAA Championship and a berth in that year's NCAA tournament. The star of that team was Gabriela Mărginean, a junior at the time who would go on to become the all-time scoring leader in the history of Philadelphia area collegiate women's basketball. Following that championship season, Dillon steered the Dragons to four-consecutive WNIT appearances, the program's first-ever postseason victory in the 2012 WNIT over Fairfield, and the 2013 WNIT championship.

From 1993 to 1996, she was a star basketball player at Villanova University. She earned three All Big-East honors at Villanova. She became just the 12th player in school history to score 1,000 points. She later served as an assistant on the Wildcats basketball team from 1997 to 2001. For her playing career, Dillon was enshrined in the Philadelphia Big 5 Hall of Fame, the Villanova Wildcats Hall of Fame, and her native Delaware County, Pennsylvania Athletics Hall of Fame.

On March 27, 2020, it was announced that Dillon would become the head coach of Villanova's women's basketball team, taking the helm from coach Harry Perretta after his 42nd season with the team.

In 2022, Dillon was named the Big East Coach of the Year. The team was picked to finish 5th in the preseason polls, but the team ended up in second place behind the University of Connecticut. Dillon's Villanova Wildcats earned an invitation to the NCAA women's basketball tournament, and upset sixth-seeded BYU in the opening-round behind 25 points from Maddy Siegrist.

== Head coaching record ==
Record table
Season	Team	Overall	Conference	Standing	Postseason
Drexel (Colonial Athletic Association) (2003–2020)
2003–04	Drexel	10–18	7–11	T–7th	
2004–05	Drexel	19–10	12–6	3rd	
2005–06	Drexel	15–14	9–9	T–6th	
2006–07	Drexel	10–21	4–14	9th	
2007–08	Drexel	18–12	13–5	T–3rd	
2008–09	Drexel	24–9	16–2	1st	NCAA First Round
2009–10	Drexel	17–14	11–7	T–4th	WNIT First Round
2010–11	Drexel	19–13	10–8	T–5th	WNIT First Round
2011–12	Drexel	19–14	12–6	3rd	WNIT Second Round
2012–13	Drexel	28–10	13–5	3rd	WNIT Champions
2013–14	Drexel	15–16	9–7	T-3rd	
2014–15	Drexel	20–11	14–4	2nd	WNIT First Round
2015–16	Drexel	19–14	13–5	T–2nd	WNIT First Round
2016–17	Drexel	22–11	11–7	3rd	WNIT Second Round
2017–18	Drexel	27–8	16–2	T-1st	WNIT Second Round
2018–19	Drexel	24–9	14–4	2nd	WNIT First Round
2019–20	Drexel	23–7	16–2	T–1st	Postseason cancelled due to COVID-19
Drexel:		329–211 (.609)	200–104 (.658)		
Villanova (Big East) (2020–present)
2020–21	Villanova	17–7	9–5	5th	WNIT Quarterfinals
2021–22	Villanova	24–9	15–4	2nd	NCAA Second Round
2022–23	Villanova	30–7	17–3	2nd	NCAA Sweet Sixteen
2023–24	Villanova	22–13	11–7	T–3rd	WBIT Runner-up
2024–25	Villanova	21–15	11–7	5th	WBIT Semifinals
2025–26	Villanova	25–8	16–4	2nd	NCAA First Round
Villanova:		139–59 (.702)	79–30 (.725)		
Total:		468–270 (.634)			
National champion Postseason invitational champion Conference regular season champion Conference regular season and conference tournament champion Division regular season champion Division regular season and conference tournament champion Conference tournament champion
