= Archbishop John Carroll High School =

Catholic high school in Pennsylvania, US

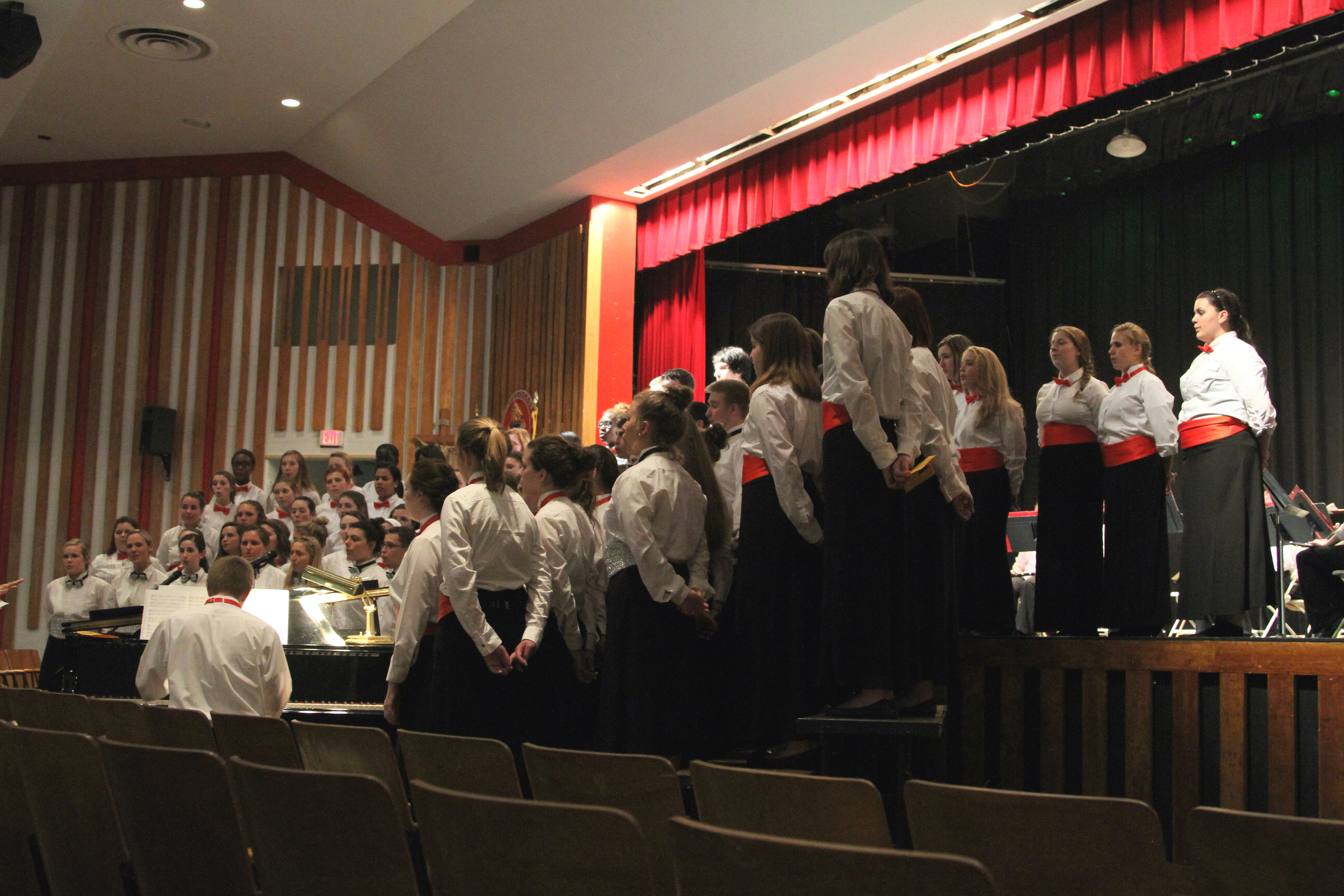
- 2012 Spring Concert

Location
- 211 Matsonford Road; Radnor, Pennsylvania 19087; United States; 40°2′47″N 75°21′14″W

Information
- Type: Private, Coeducational
- Motto: Pro Deo Et Patria (For God and Country)
- Religious affiliation: Catholic Church
- Established: 1967
- Founder: Augustinian Friars
- School district: Archdiocese of Philadelphia
- School code: 472
- President: William Gennaro
- Principal: Allison Vinci
- Chaplain: Joseph McCaffery
- Faculty: 45
- Grades: 9-12
  - Grade 9: 182
  - Grade 10: 178
  - Grade 11: 177
  - Grade 12: 153
- Average class size: 25
- Campus size: 55 Acres
- Colors: Red and White
- Song: High on the Hilltop
- Mascot: Patriot
- Rival: Monsignor Bonner; Cardinal O’Hara
- Accreditation: Middle States Association of Colleges and Schools
- Publication: Origins
- Newspaper: Carroll Times
- Yearbook: Legacy
- Website: www.jcarroll.org

Archbishop John Carroll High School is a four-year, private, Catholic secondary school part of the Archdiocese of Philadelphia, located in Radnor, Pennsylvania, United States, on a 55-acre campus. The school currently enrolls approximately 685 students (2024).

== History ==
Archbishop John Carroll High School was opened in September 1967. It is named after John Carroll, the first Catholic Bishop of the United States. In April 1968, the school was officially dedicated and blessed. Originally two separate secondary schools, Archbishop John Carroll for Boys and Archbishop John Carroll for Girls were the final secondary schools completed under the building program instituted by Archbishop John Krol. The two schools merged and became co-educational in September 1986, assuming the name Archbishop John Carroll High School. The school was formerly staffed by the Christian brothers and the Sisters of St. Joseph, but now predominantly by lay personnel. On April 28–29, 2018 Archbishop Carroll celebrated its 50th anniversary.

== Academic program of study ==
The curriculum is primarily focused upon college-preparatory with elective classes in the fine arts, business education and computer literacy.

The following class groupings are designed to accommodate the needs and challenges the abilities of each student:

- Diocesan Scholar Program (college courses taken during the senior year)
- Advanced Placement (college level work offered in 9 subject areas)
- Honors (above average)
- Track 2 (average)

Recently, Archbishop Carroll graduates have received scholarships worth over $24.5 million (2013), with 98% of all students continuing on to a college or university.

== Athletics ==
Archbishop John Carroll High Schools offers fall, winter, and spring sports, with over 60% of the student body participating in the athletics program. Archbishop Carroll athletic teams compete in the Philadelphia Catholic League and belong to the Pennsylvania Interscholastic Athletic Association PIAA. In the 2008–09 season, both the Boys and Girls varsity basketball teams won the PIAA AAA State Championship, earning 2 state titles for Archbishop Carroll.

=== Fall sports ===
- Cheerleading
- Crew
- Cross Country, Boys/Girls
- Field Hockey
- Football
- Golf
- Soccer – Boys/Girls
- Tennis – Girls
- Volleyball

=== Winter sports ===
- Basketball – Boys/Girls
- Cheerleading
- Fencing
- Ice Hockey
- Indoor Track – Boys/Girls
- Swimming – Boys/Girls
- Unified Bocce (BestBuddies)
- Wrestling

=== Spring sports ===
- Baseball
- Crew
- Lacrosse – Boys/Girls
- Outdoor Track – Boys/Girls
- Softball
- Tennis – Boys
- Flag Football – Girls

== Activities ==
Archbishop Carroll offers a wide variety of extracurricular activities, including:

Academic clubs:

- Concert Band
- Delco Hi-Q
- Mixed Select Chorus
- National Art Honor Society
- National Honor Society
- Pennsylvania Junior Academy of Science (PJAS)
- Reading Olympics
- Tri-M Music Honor Society

Publications

- Carroll Times
- Legacy (Yearbook)
- Origins

Service clubs

- Community Service Corps (CSC)
- Diversity Club
- Rotary Club
- PatrioTHON
- Pro-Life Club
- Red Cross-Blood Drive
- Student Ambassadors
- Student Council

Social clubs

- Dance Committee
- Intramurals

Special interest

- Archbishop Carroll Theater Society (ACTS)
- Art Club
- Band
- Best Buddies
- Carroll Sports Media
- Gardening Club
- Writing Club
- Advancement Ambassadors
- Game Club
- Mock Trial Club
- Patriot News TV

== Notable alumni ==
- Maria Bello, actress; World Trade Center, Thank You for Smoking, Secret Window, Coyote Ugly, and ER
- Ryan Daly, basketball player and coach
- Burt Grossman, retired NFL player, Philadelphia Eagles and San Diego Chargers
- Brad Ingelsby, screenwriter; Mare of Easttown (TV series), Out of the Furnace (film), The Way Back
- Brian McDonough physician, author and television-radio personality
- Lawrence Nowlan, sculptor
- Gerard Phelan, wide receiver Boston College; caught famed Hail Mary pass from Doug Flutie (1984) vs. University of Miami
- John Prendergast (class of 1981), human rights activist, author, and former Director for African Affairs at the National Security Council
- Maurice Stovall, wide receiver; Tampa Bay Buccaneers
- Mike Costanzo, former third baseman; Cincinnati Reds
- Joseph Clancy, former director of the Secret Service
- Derrick Jones Jr., NBA basketball player
- Eric Tangradi, former NHL forward Pittsburgh Penguins
- Will Smith, actor (One Year Only: Did not Graduate)
- Kate Flannery, actress; The Office (Meredith Palmer), The Real Live Brady Bunch, The Second City Touring Company
