= 2012–13 NCAA Division I women's basketball season =

American college basketball season

- Preseason AP No. 1: Baylor Lady Bears
- Regular season: November 2012 – March 10, 2013
- NCAA Tournament: 2013
- Tournament dates: March 23 – April 9, 2013
- National Championship: New Orleans Arena; New Orleans, Louisiana
- NCAA Champions: Connecticut Huskies
- Other champions: Drexel Dragons (WNIT); Santa Clara Broncos (CBI)

The 2012–13 NCAA Division I women's basketball season began in November and ended with the Final Four at New Orleans Arena in New Orleans, from April 7–9.

== Season headlines ==
- October 30 – The AP preseason All-American team was named. Three players received all 40 possible votes from the media panel—Baylor center Brittney Griner, Notre Dame point guard Skylar Diggins, and Delaware's multi-positional Elena Delle Donne. They were joined by Stanford power forward Chiney Ogwumike (23 votes), Baylor point guard Odyssey Sims (19), and Maryland power forward Alyssa Thomas (19). Sims and Thomas tied in the voting, creating a sixth spot on the team.
- December 15 – The seven Big East Conference schools that do not sponsor FBS football (DePaul, Georgetown, St. John's, Providence, Villanova, Seton Hall and Marquette, collectively called the "Catholic 7") announced that they would break from the Big East and pursue other conference affiliation. The move leaves Connecticut as the only original Big East member set to remain in the conference.
- February 28 – ESPN reports that the "Catholic 7" will launch their new conference in July 2013, two years ahead of schedule, and will purchase the rights to the "Big East" name from the remaining conference schools. Two Atlantic 10 Conference members, Butler (which had only joined the A10 in July 2012) and Xavier, will reportedly join the new Big East, with Missouri Valley Conference member Creighton also a possibility.
- March 8 – The Big East split is officially announced. As previously reported, the "Catholic 7" will leave on June 30 with the Big East name. As of the announcement, the "Catholic 7" were the only members of the new Big East, but Butler, Xavier, and Creighton were added March 20.

== Milestones and records ==
- January 6, 2014 - Missouri's Morgan Eye hit 11 three-pointers in a game against Auburn, tied for third most three-pointers in a single game (in NCAA history).
- February 22, 2013 - Saint Peters' Bridget Whitfield hit eight of eight three-point attempts, tied for third most (in NCAA history) without a miss.
- Baylor's Brittney Griner scored 3,283 points in her career, the third highest career total in NCAA history.
- Baylor's Brittney Griner recorded more than 2,000 points and 500 rebounds, the only player in NCAA history to reach that milestone.

=== Coaching wins milestones ===
- 900 victories - Sylvia Hatchell - University of North Carolina. February 7 versus Boston College.
- 900 victories - Andy Landers - University of Georgia. February 24 versus Mississippi.
- 900 victories - C. Vivian Stringer - Rutgers University. February 26 versus South Florida.
- 700 victories - Muffet McGraw - University of Notre Dame. February 5 versus Villanova.
- 600 victories - Lisa Bluder - University of Iowa. January 20 versus Purdue.

== Conference membership changes ==
The 2012–13 season saw the second wave of membership changes resulting from a major realignment of NCAA Division I conferences. The cycle began in 2010 with the Big Ten and the then-Pac-10 publicly announcing their intentions to expand. The fallout from these conferences' moves later affected a majority of D-I conferences.

In addition, two schools are moving from Division II starting this season. These schools will be ineligible for NCAA-sponsored postseason play until completing their D-I transitions in 2016. Finally, one school that had announced a transition to Division II, New Orleans, announced that it would halt its transition and remain in Division I.

School	Former conference	New conference
Belmont Bruins	A-Sun	OVC
Butler Bulldogs	Horizon League	Atlantic 10
Denver Pioneers	Sun Belt	WAC
Fresno State Bulldogs	WAC	Mountain West
Hawaiʻi Rainbow Wahine	WAC	Big West
Longwood Lancers	Independent	Big South
Missouri Tigers	Big 12	SEC
Nebraska–Omaha Mavericks	MIAA (D-II)	Summit League
Nevada Wolf Pack	WAC	Mountain West
New Orleans Privateers	Division II independent	Division I independent
North Dakota Fighting Sioux	Great West	Big Sky
Northern Kentucky Norse	GLVC (D-II)	A-Sun
Oral Roberts Golden Eagles	Summit League	Southland
Seattle Redhawks	Independent	WAC
Southern Utah Thunderbirds	Summit League	Big Sky
TCU Lady Frogs	Mountain West	Big 12
Texas A&M Aggies	Big 12	SEC
Texas State Bobcats	Southland	WAC
UT Arlington Mavericks	Southland	WAC
UTSA Roadrunners	Southland	WAC
VCU Rams	CAA	Atlantic 10
West Virginia Mountaineers	Big East	Big 12

== New arenas ==
- Coastal Carolina left behind one of the smallest venues in Division I basketball, Kimbel Arena (seating little over 1,000). The Chanticleers remained on campus at the new HTC Center.
- Troy left its on-campus home, the original Trojan Arena, for a new on-campus venue also named Trojan Arena.

== Major rule changes ==
- There is now unlimited contact, including text messaging, allowed between college coaches and a prospective player in high school and junior college recruiting.

== Season outlook ==
=== Pre-season polls ===
The top 25 from the AP and ESPN/USA Today Coaches Polls.

'Associated Press'
Ranking	Team
1	Baylor (40)
2	Connecticut
3	Duke
4	Stanford
5	Maryland
6	Kentucky
7	Notre Dame
8	Penn State
9	Louisville
10	Georgia
11	Delaware
12	Oklahoma
13	California
14	St. John's
15	Texas A&M
16	Vanderbilt
17	West Virginia
18	Nebraska
19	Ohio State
20	Tennessee
21	Purdue
22	Georgia Tech
23	Oklahoma State
24	Miami (FL)
25	DePaul

ESPN/USA Today Coaches
Ranking	Team
1	Baylor (31)
2	Connecticut
3	Duke
4	Stanford
5	Maryland
6	Notre Dame
7	Kentucky
8	Penn State
9	Louisville
10	Delaware
11	Georgia
12	Texas A&M
13	St. John's
14	Oklahoma
15	California
16	Tennessee
17	Vanderbilt
18	Purdue
19	Nebraska
20	Georgia Tech
21	Ohio State
22	West Virginia
23	Miami (FL)
24	Oklahoma State
25	Green Bayт; Kansasт

== Regular season ==
A number of early-season tournaments marked the beginning of the college basketball season.

=== Conference winners and tournaments ===
Thirty athletic conferences each end their regular seasons with a single-elimination tournament. The teams in each conference that win their regular season title are given the number one seed in each tournament. The winners of these tournaments receive automatic invitations to the 2013 NCAA Men's Division I Basketball Tournament. The Ivy League does not have a conference tournament, instead giving their automatic invitation to their regular season champion. As of 2013, the Great West Conference does not have an automatic bid to the NCAA Men or Women's College Tournament.

Conference	Regular season winner	Conference player of the year	Conference Coach of the Year	Conference tournament	Tournament venue (city)	Tournament winner
America East Conference	Albany	Ebone Henry, Chantell Alford	Katie Abrahamson-Henderson	2013 America East women's basketball tournament	SEFCU Arena (Guilderland, New York); Final at campus site	Albany
Atlantic 10 Conference	Dayton	Jennifer Hailey, Charlotte	Jim Jabir, Dayton	2013 Atlantic 10 women's basketball tournament	Hagan Arena (Philadelphia); Final at Barclays Center (Brooklyn, New York)	Saint Joseph's
Atlantic Coast Conference	Duke	Alyssa Thomas, Maryland (media); Alyssa Thomas, Maryland & Chelsea Gray, Duke (coaches)	Joanne P. McCallie, Duke (media); Brenda Frese, Maryland (coaches)	2013 ACC women's basketball tournament	Greensboro Coliseum (Greensboro, North Carolina)	Duke
Atlantic Sun Conference	Florida Gulf Coast	Sarah Hansen, Florida Gulf Coast	Karl Smesko, Florida Gulf Coast	2013 Atlantic Sun women's basketball tournament	University Center (Macon, Georgia)	Stetson
Big 12 Conference	Baylor	Brittney Griner, Baylor	Kim Mulkey, Baylor	2013 Big 12 women's basketball tournament	American Airlines Center (Dallas)	Baylor
Big East Conference	Notre Dame	Skylar Diggins, Notre Dame	Muffet McGraw, Notre Dame	2013 Big East women's basketball tournament	XL Center (Hartford, Connecticut)	Notre Dame
Big Sky Conference	Montana	Katie Baker, Montana	Robin Selvig, Montana	2013 Big Sky Conference women's basketball tournament	Dahlberg Arena (Missoula, Montana)	Montana
Big South Conference	Liberty	Dequesha McClanahan, Winthrop	Ronny Fisher, Presbyterian	2013 Big South Conference women's basketball tournament	HTC Center (Conway, South Carolina)	Liberty
Big Ten Conference	Penn State	Maggie Lucas, Penn State	Coquese Washington, Penn State (media) Connie Yori, Nebraska (coaches)	2013 Big Ten Conference women's basketball tournament	Sears Centre (Hoffman Estates, Illinois)	Purdue
Big West Conference	Pacific	Molly Schlemer, Cal Poly	Lynne Roberts, Pacific	2013 Big West Conference women's basketball tournament	First round and quarterfinals: Bren Events Center (Irvine, California); Semifinals and final: Honda Center (Anaheim, California)	Cal Poly
Colonial Athletic Association	Delaware	Elena Delle Donne, Delaware	Daynia La-Force, Northeastern	2013 CAA women's basketball tournament	The Show Place Arena (Upper Marlboro, Maryland)	Delaware
Conference USA	SMU	Keena Mays, SMU	Heather Macy, East Carolina	2013 Conference USA women's basketball tournament	Tulsa, Oklahoma; First round and quarterfinals: Tulsa Convention Center; Semifinals and final: BOK Center	Tulsa
Great West Conference	Utah Valley	Sammie Jensen, Utah Valley	Cathy Nixon, Utah Valley	2013 Great West Conference women's basketball tournament	Emil and Patricia Jones Convocation Center; Chicago	NJIT
Horizon League	Green Bay	Brandi Brown, Youngstown State	Bob Boldon, Youngstown State	2013 Horizon League women's basketball tournament	First round at campus sites Quarterfinals and semifinals at top seed Final at top remaining seed	Green Bay
Independent	Cal State Bakersfield			No tournament		
Ivy League	Princeton	Niveen Rasheed, Princeton	not awarded	No tournament		
Metro Atlantic Athletic Conference	Marist	Damika Martinez, Iona	Brian Giorgis, Marist	2013 MAAC women's basketball tournament	MassMutual Center (Springfield, Massachusetts)	Marist
Mid-American Conference	Akron (East); Toledo (West)	Rachel Tecca, Akron	Tricia Cullop, Toledo	2013 Mid-American Conference women's basketball tournament	First round at campus sites Remainder at Quicken Loans Arena (Cleveland, Ohio)	Central Michigan
Mid-Eastern Athletic Conference	Hampton	Keiara Avant, Hampton	David Six, Hampton	2013 MEAC women's basketball tournament	Norfolk Scope (Norfolk, Virginia)	Hampton
Missouri Valley Conference	Creighton & Wichita State	Jacqui Kalin, Northern Iowa	Jody Adams, Wichita State	2013 Missouri Valley Conference women's basketball tournament	The Family Arena (St. Charles, Missouri)	Wichita State
Mountain West Conference	San Diego State	Chelsea Hopkins, San Diego State	Beth Burns, San Diego State	2013 Mountain West Conference women's basketball tournament	Thomas & Mack Center (Paradise, Nevada)	Fresno State
Northeast Conference	Quinnipiac	Artemis Spanou, Roger Morris	Tricia Fabbri, Quinnipiac	2013 Northeast Conference women's basketball tournament	Campus Sites	Quinnipiac
Ohio Valley Conference	Eastern Illinois (East); Tennessee Tech (West)	Jasmine Newsome, UT–Martin	Lee Buchanan, Eastern Illinois	2013 Ohio Valley Conference women's basketball tournament	Nashville Municipal Auditorium (Nashville, Tennessee)	Tennessee–Martin
Pac-12 Conference	Stanford & California	Chiney Ogwumike, Stanford	Tara VanDerveer, Stanford	2013 Pac-12 Conference women's basketball tournament	KeyArena (Seattle)	Stanford
Patriot League	Army & Navy	Kelsey Minato, Army	Dave Magarity, Army	2013 Patriot League women's basketball tournament	Campus Sites	Navy
Southeastern Conference	Tennessee	A'dia Mathies, Kentucky & Meighan Simmons, Tennessee	Holly Warlick, Tennessee	2013 SEC women's basketball tournament	Arena at Gwinnett Center (Duluth, Georgia)	Texas A&M
Southern Conference	Chattanooga	Sophia Aleksandravicius, Davidson	Wes Moore, Chattanooga	2013 Southern Conference women's basketball tournament	Asheville, North Carolina; First round and quarterfinals: Kimmel Arena; Semifinals and final: U.S. Cellular Center	Chattanooga
Southland Conference	Oral Roberts & Sam Houston State	Megan Herbert, Central Arkansas	Brenda Nichols, Sam Houston State	2013 Southland Conference women's basketball tournament	Leonard E. Merrell Center (Katy, Texas)	Oral Roberts
Southwestern Athletic Conference	Mississippi Valley State & Southern	Latia Williams, Prairie View A&M	Nate Kilbert, Arkansas–Pine Bluff	2013 SWAC women's basketball tournament	Curtis Culwell Center (Garland, Texas)	Prairie View A&M
The Summit League	South Dakota State	Amanda Hyde, Fort Wayne	Austin Parkinson, IUPUI	2013 The Summit League women's basketball tournament	Sioux Falls Arena (Sioux Falls, South Dakota)	South Dakota State
Sun Belt Conference	Middle Tennessee (East); Arkansas–Little Rock (West)	Jerica Coley, FIU	Michelle Clark-Heard, Western Kentucky	2013 Sun Belt Conference women's basketball tournament	Summit Arena (Hot Springs, Arkansas)	Middle Tennessee
West Coast Conference	Gonzaga	Taelor Karr, Gonzaga	Kelly Graves, Gonzaga	2013 West Coast Conference women's basketball tournament	Orleans Arena (Paradise, Nevada)	Gonzaga
Western Athletic Conference	Seattle	Kacie Sowell, Seattle	Joan Bonvicini, Seattle	2013 WAC women's basketball tournament	Orleans Arena (Paradise, Nevada)	Idaho

== Postseason tournaments ==
=== NCAA tournament ===
==== Final Four – New Orleans Arena, New Orleans, Louisiana ====
National Semifinals; April 7
OKC 5	Louisville	64
SPK 2	California	57
NRF 1	Notre Dame	65
BRP 1	Connecticut	83

National Championship Game; April 9
OKC 5	Louisville	60
BRP 1	Connecticut	93

==== Tournament upsets ====
For this list, a "major upset" is defined as a win by a team seeded 7 or more spots below its defeated opponent.

Date	Winner	Score	Loser

=== Women's National Invitation tournament ===
After the NCAA Tournament field is announced, 64 teams were invited to participate in the Women's National Invitation Tournament. The tournament began on March 20, 2013, and ended with the final on April 6. Unlike the men's National Invitation Tournament, whose semifinals and finals are held at Madison Square Garden, the WNIT holds all of its games at campus sites.

==== WNIT Semifinals and Final ====
Played at campus sites

Semifinals; April 3
1	Utah	54^{OT}
4	Kansas State	46
3	Drexel	67
2	Florida	57

Championship game April 6
Utah	43
Drexel	46

== Award winners ==
=== Major player of the year awards ===
- Wooden Award: Brittney Griner, Baylor
- Naismith Award: Brittney Griner, Baylor
- Associated Press Player of the Year: Brittney Griner, Baylor
- Wade Trophy: Brittney Griner, Baylor

=== Major freshman of the year awards ===
- USBWA National Freshman of the Year (USBWA): Jewell Loyd

=== Major coach of the year awards ===
- Associated Press Coach of the Year: Muffet McGraw, Notre Dame
- Naismith College Coach of the Year: Muffet McGraw
- WBCA National Coach of the Year Award: Muffet McGraw

=== Other major awards ===
- Nancy Lieberman Award (best point guard): Skylar Diggins
- Frances Pomeroy Naismith Award (best senior 5'8"/1.78 m or shorter): Alex Bentley, Penn State
- Senior CLASS Award (top senior): Elena Delle Donne
- Maggie Dixon Award (top first-year head coach): Holly Warlick
- Academic All-American of the Year (Top scholar-athlete): Elena Delle Donne, Delaware
- Elite 89 Award (Top GPA among upperclass players at Final Four): Jude Schimmel, Louisville

== Coaching changes ==
A number of teams changed coaches during and after the season.
