= George Mason Patriots women's basketball =

2026–27 George Mason Patriots women's basketball team
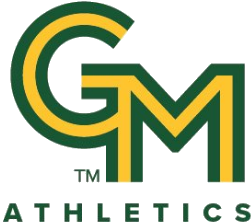
- University: George Mason University
- Head coach: Vanessa Blair-Lewis (7th season)
- Location: Fairfax, Virginia
- Arena: EagleBank Arena (capacity: 10,000)
- Conference: Atlantic 10
- Nickname: Patriots
- Colors: Green and gold
- Student section: Patriot Platoon

NCAA Division I tournament appearances
- 2025

Conference tournament champions
- 2025

Conference regular-season champions
- 2026

Uniforms
Home	Away

The George Mason Patriots women's basketball team represents George Mason University and competes in the Atlantic 10 Conference of NCAA Division I.

== History ==
George Mason's women basketball program began play in 1973, joining Division I in 1982. They were members of the Colonial Athletic Association from 1985 to 2013. They finished as runner-up in the CAA Tournament in 1988, 1994, and 2004. In 2013, they joined the Atlantic-10 Conference. The Patriots (as of the end of the 2018–19 season) have an all-time record of 581–607. In the program's history, they have five postseason appearances, 3 in the Women's National Invitation Tournament in 2001, 2004, and 2018, 2 in the WBIT, and 1 in the NCAA Tournament. They won their first ever postseason game in the 2018 Women's National Invitation Tournament.

In the 2024-2025 season, they advanced all the way to the 2025 Atlantic 10 women's basketball tournament final, their first A10 conference tournament championship appearance in school history, defeating St. Joe's 73-58 to reach their first ever NCAA Tournament. The #11 seed Patriots played #6 seed Florida State in the 2025 Women's NCAA Tournament, falling 59-94. They ended the season with a 27-6 record, the best in program history.

In the 2025-2026 season, the Patriots followed up their previous year’s success by winning the team’s first Atlantic 10 Regular Season title, with a 16-2 Conference record, the best in program history. Following their strong regular season, the #2 Patriots made it to a second consecutive Atlantic 10 conference championship game, where they fell short to the #1 Rhode Island 51-53. Following their successful season, the Patriots were invited to the Women’s Basketball Invitation Tournament for the 2nd time.

== Postseason ==
=== NCAA Division I ===
George Mason appeared in the NCAA Division I women's basketball tournament once.

Year	Seed	Round	Opponent	Result
2025	#11	First Round	#6 Florida State	L 59-94

=== WBIT ===
George Mason has appeared in the Women's Basketball Invitation Tournament twice.

Year	Seed	Round	Opponent	Result
2024		First Round	#1 Penn State	L 80–84
2026	#3	First Round	Quinnipiac	L 64-71

=== WNIT ===
George Mason appeared in the Women's National Invitation Tournament (WNIT) three times. They have a record of 1–3.

Year	Round	Opponent	Result
2001	First Round	Georgetown	L 56–66
2004	First Round	Seton Hall	L 56–61
2018	First Round; Second Round	Stephen F. Austin; Virginia Tech	W 82–75; L 69–78
