= UConn Huskies women's basketball statistical leaders =

The UConn Huskies women's basketball statistical leaders are individual statistical leaders of the UConn Huskies women's basketball program in various categories, including points, three-pointers, assists, blocks, rebounds, and steals. Within those areas, the lists identify single-game, single-season, and career leaders. The Huskies represent the University of Connecticut in the NCAA Division I Big East Conference.

UConn began competing in intercollegiate women's basketball in 1974, before the NCAA governed women's sports; in that era, the main governing body for women's college sports was the Association of Intercollegiate Athletics for Women (AIAW). The NCAA began governing women's sports in the 1981–82 school year; after one year in which both the NCAA and AIAW held national championship events, the AIAW folded. Because of UConn's relatively recent history in women's basketball, there is no "pre-modern" era of limited statistics; full box scores are available for all UConn games, and the only rules change that seriously impacted statistical totals was the advent of the three-pointer, which was made mandatory in NCAA women's basketball in the 1987–88 season.

The NCAA has recorded individual scoring and rebounding totals since it began sponsoring women's sports championships. However, it did not officially record the other statistics included in this page until later. Assists were first officially recorded in women's basketball in the 1985–86 season. Blocks and steals were first officially recorded in 1987–88, the same season in which the use of the three-pointer was made mandatory. UConn only includes three-point statistics since the national adoption of that rule, and only began recording steals in 1978–79, but otherwise includes statistics from the entire history of UConn women's basketball. These lists are updated through April 6, 2025.

Players active in the 2026–27 season are in bold type.

== Scoring ==
Career
Rk	Player	Points	Seasons
1	Maya Moore	3,036	2007–08 2008–09 2009–10 2010–11
2	Breanna Stewart	2,676	2012–13 2013–14 2014–15 2015–16
3	Paige Bueckers	2,439	2020–21 2021–22 2023–24 2024–25
4	Napheesa Collier	2,401	2015–16 2016–17 2017–18 2018–19
5	Tina Charles	2,346	2006–07 2007–08 2008–09 2009–10
6	Katie Lou Samuelson	2,342	2015–16 2016–17 2017–18 2018–19
7	Nykesha Sales	2,178	1994–95 1995–96 1996–97 1997–98
	Kaleena Mosqueda-Lewis	2,178	2011–12 2012–13 2013–14 2014–15
9	Kerry Bascom	2,177	1987–88 1988–89 1989–90 1990–91
10	Diana Taurasi	2,156	2000–01 2001–02 2002–03 2003–04

Season
Rk	Player	Points	Season
1	Maya Moore	868	2010–11
2	Paige Bueckers	854	2023–24
3	Napheesa Collier	792	2018–19
4	Breanna Stewart	777	2013–14
5	Paige Bueckers	756	2024–25
6	Maya Moore	754	2008–09
	Napheesa Collier	754	2016–17
8	Katie Lou Samuelson	747	2016–17
9	Maya Moore	736	2009–10
10	Breanna Stewart	716	2015–16

Single game
Rk	Player	Points	Season	Opponent
1	Nykesha Sales	46	1997–98	Stanford
2	Maya Moore	41	2010–11	Florida State
3	Maya Moore	40	2008–09	Syracuse
	Katie Lou Samuelson	40	2016–17	South Florida
	Paige Bueckers	40*	2024–25	Oklahoma
6	Kerry Bascom	39	1990–91	Toledo
	Svetlana Abrosimova	39	1998–99	UCLA
	Napheesa Collier	39	2016–17	South Florida
	**Sarah Strong**	39	2026–27	Iowa
10	Kerry Bascom	38	1989–90	St. John's
	Maya Moore	38	2009–10	Syracuse

- Note: Bueckers is the first UConn Huskies women's basketball player to score 40 or more points during the NCAA "March Madness" Tournament.

1000-Plus Points Club

Extended content
1. Maya Moore (3,036)
2. Breanna Stewart (2,676)
3. Paige Bueckers (2,439)
4. Napheesa Collier (2,401)
5. Tina Charles (2,346)
6. Katie Lou Samuelson (2,342)
7. Kaleena Mosqueda-Lewis (2,178)
8. Nykesha Sales (2,178)
9. Kerry Bascom (2,177)
10. Diana Taurasi (2,156)
11. Kara Wolters (2,141)
12. Rebecca Lobo (2,133)
13. Bria Hartley (1,994)
14. Renee Montgomery (1,990)
15. Svetlana Abrosimova (1,865)
16. Aaliyah Edwards (1,861)
17. Christyn Williams (1,850)
18. Tiffany Hayes (1,801)
19. Stefanie Dolson (1,797)
20. Ann Strother (1,699)
21. Azzi Fudd (1,687)
22. Shea Ralph (1,678)
23. Kia Nurse (1,674)
24. Barbara Turner (1,629)
25. Swin Cash (1,583)
26. Gabby Williams (1,582)
27. Wendy Davis (1,552)
28. Jennifer Rizzotti (1,540)
29. Cathy Bochain (1,534)
30. Moriah Jefferson (1,532)
31. Asjha Jones (1,502)
32. **Sarah Strong** (1,484)
33. Crystal Dangerfield (1,480)
34. Kalana Greene (1,444)
35. Peggy Walsh (1,413)
36. Chris Gedney (1,409)
37. Tamika Williams (1,402)
38. Leigh Curl (1,388)
39. Jamelle Elliott (1,387)
40. Carla Berube (1,381)
41. Sue Bird (1,378)
42. Charde Houston (1,365)
43. Laura Lishness (1,303)
44. Morgan Tuck (1,298)
45. Megan Walker (1,251)
46. Kris Lamb (1,244)
47. Jessica Moore (1,223)
48. Olivia Nelson-Ododa (1,179)
49. Kelly Faris (1,109)
50. Megan Pattyson (1,106)
51. Mel Thomas (1,098)
52. **Ashlynn Shade** (1,071)
53. Ashley Battle (1,054)
54. Amy Duran (1,000)

== Three-pointers ==
Career
Rk	Player	3FG	Seasons
1	Kaleena Mosqueda-Lewis	398	2011–12 2012–13 2013–14 2014–15
2	Katie Lou Samuelson	382	2015–16 2016–17 2017–18 2018–19
3	Diana Taurasi	318	2000–01 2001–02 2002–03 2003–04
4	Maya Moore	311	2007–08 2008–09 2009–10 2010–11
5	Azzi Fudd	292	2021–22 2023–24 2024–25 2025–26
6	Ann Strother	290	2002–03 2003–04 2004–05 2005–06
7	Wendy Davis	279	1988–89 1989–90 1990–91 1991–92
8	Kia Nurse	262	2014–15 2015–16 2016–17 2017–18
9	Bria Hartley	259	2010–11 2011–12 2012–13 2013–14
10	Renee Montgomery	254	2005–06 2006–07 2007–08 2008–09

Season
Rk	Player	3FG	Season
1	Kaleena Mosqueda-Lewis	121	2014–15
2	Katie Lou Samuelson	119	2016–17
3	Kaleena Mosqueda-Lewis	118	2012–13
4	Azzi Fudd	117	2025–26
5	Wendy Davis	107	1991–92
6	Renee Montgomery	99	2008–09
7	Katie Lou Samuelson	96	2017–18
8	Kaleena Mosqueda-Lewis	93	2011–12
9	Diana Taurasi	92	2001–02
10	Maya Moore	90	2008–09

Single game
Rk	Player	3FG	Season	Opponent
1	Maya Moore	10	2008–09	Syracuse
	Kaleena Mosqueda-Lewis	10	2014–15	UC Davis
	Katie Lou Samuelson	10	2016–17	South Florida
	**Allie Ziebell**	10	2025–26	Xavier
5	Kia Nurse	9	2016–17	Syracuse
6	Wendy Davis	8	1991–92	Florida
	Katie Lou Samuelson	8	2018–19	Memphis
	Anna Makurat	8	2019–20	East Carolina
	Azzi Fudd	8	2024-25	St. John's
	Azzi Fudd	8	2025-26	Syracuse

== Rebounds ==
Career
Rk	Player	Rebounds	Seasons
1	Tina Charles	1,367	2006–07 2007–08 2008–09 2009–10
2	Maya Moore	1,276	2007–08 2008–09 2009–10 2010–11
3	Rebecca Lobo	1,268	1991–92 1992–93 1993–94 1994–95
4	Napheesa Collier	1,219	2015–16 2016–17 2017–18 2018–19
5	Breanna Stewart	1,179	2012–13 2013–14 2014–15 2015–16
6	Stefanie Dolson	1,101	2010–11 2011–12 2012–13 2013–14
7	Jamelle Elliott	1,054	1992–93 1993–94 1994–95 1995–96
8	Aaliyah Edwards	1,020	2020–21 2021–22 2022–23 2023–24
9	Gabby Williams	1,007	2014–15 2015–16 2016–17 2017–18
10	Peggy Walsh	937	1982–83 1983–84 1984–85 1985–86

Season
Rk	Player	Rebounds	Season
1	Napheesa Collier	411	2018–19
2	Tina Charles	372	2009–10
3	Rebecca Lobo	371	1993–94
	Stefanie Dolson	371	2013–14
5	**Sarah Strong**	356	2024–25
6	Tina Charles	350	2007–08
7	Tina Charles	348	2008–09
	Maya Moore	348	2008–09
9	Rebecca Lobo	343	1994–95
10	Aaliyah Edwards	341	2023–24

Single game
Rk	Player	Rebounds	Season	Opponent
1	Rosemary Borsuk	25	1976–77	Keene State
	Chris Gedney	25	1977–78	Central Connecticut
	Peggy Walsh	25	1985–86	Pittsburgh
4	Rebecca Lobo	24	1992–93	Seton Hall
5	Jody Eckert	22	1975–76	Brown
6	Peggy Walsh	21	1983–84	Pittsburgh
	Renee Najarian	21	1986–87	Drexel
	Rebecca Lobo	21	1993–94	Boston College
	Tina Charles	21	2009–10	St. John's
10	7 times by 7 players	20	Most recent: Sarah Strong, 2025 vs Michigan	

== Assists ==
Career
Rk	Player	Assists	Seasons
1	Nika Mühl	686	2020–21 2021–22 2022–23 2023–24
2	Moriah Jefferson	659	2012–13 2013–14 2014–15 2015–16
3	Diana Taurasi	648	2000–01 2001–02 2002–03 2003–04
4	Jennifer Rizzotti	637	1992–93 1993–94 1994–95 1995–96
5	Renee Montgomery	632	2005–06 2006–07 2007–08 2008–09
6	Crystal Dangerfield	599	2016–17 2017–18 2018–19 2019–20
7	Sue Bird	585	1998–99 1999–00 2000–01 2001–02
8	Paige Bueckers	561	2020–21 2021–22 2023–24 2024–25
9	Bria Hartley	559	2010–11 2011–12 2012–13 2013–14
10	Pam Webber	546	1991–92 1992–93 1993–94 1994–95

Season
Rk	Player	Assists	Season
1	Nika Mühl	284	2022–23
2	Nika Mühl	253	2023–24
3	Sue Bird	231	2001–02
4	Crystal Dangerfield	225	2018–19
5	Jennifer Rizzotti	222	1995–96
6	Diana Taurasi	208	2001–02
7	Moriah Jefferson	204	2015–16
8	Maya Moore	199	2008–09
9	Moriah Jefferson	195	2013–14
10	Moriah Jefferson	191	2014–15
	Gabby Williams	191	2017–18

Single game
Rk	Player	Assists	Season	Opponent
1	Nika Mühl	15	2022–23	NC State
2	Paige Bueckers	14	2020–21	Butler
	Nika Mühl	14	2022–23	Tennessee
4	Susie Sturman	13	1979–80	Vermont
	Laura Lishness	13	1990–91	Seton Hall
	Renee Montgomery	13	2008–09	Oklahoma
	Nika Mühl	13	2022–23	Iowa
	Nika Mühl	13	2022–23	Seton Hall
	Nika Mühl	13	2023–24	Providence
10	10 times by 8 different players	12	No information on players or dates	

== Steals ==
UConn did not begin recording steals until 1978.

Career
Rk	Player	Steals	Seasons
1	Nykesha Sales	447	1994–95 1995–96 1996–97 1997–98
2	Moriah Jefferson	353	2012–13 2013–14 2014–15 2015–16
3	Jennifer Rizzotti	349	1992–93 1993–94 1994–95 1995–96
4	Maya Moore	310	2007–08 2008–09 2009–10 2010–11
5	Gabby Williams	305	2014–15 2015–16 2016–17 2017–18
6	Svetlana Abrosimova	299	1997–98 1998–99 1999–00 2000–01
7	Kelly Faris	294	2009–10 2010–11 2011–12 2012–13
8	Debbie Baer	275	1988–89 1989–90 1990–91 1991–92
9	Renee Montgomery	266	2005–06 2006–07 2007–08 2008–09
-	**KK Arnold**	266	2023–24 2024–25 2025–26 2026–27

Season
Rk	Player	Steals	Season
1	Nykesha Sales	143	1996–97
2	**Sarah Strong**	130	2025–26
3	Jennifer Rizzotti	112	1995–96
4	Rita Williams	108	1997–98
5	Rita Williams	107	1996–97
6	Moriah Jefferson	106	2013–14
7	Nykesha Sales	104	1995–96
8	Nykesha Sales	102	1994–95
-	**KK Arnold**	102	2025–26
10	Moriah Jefferson	100	2014–15
-	Gabby Williams	100	2016–17

Single game
Rk	Player	Steals	Season	Opponent
1	Cathy Bochain	10	1979–80	Vermont
	Jennifer Rizzotti	10	1995–96	Providence
3	Nykesha Sales	9	1996–97	Lehigh
	Moriah Jefferson	9	2013–14	Memphis
	**Ashlynn Shade**	9	2025–26	Xavier
6	Renee Montgomery	8	2005–06	Hofstra
	Charde Houston	8	2006–07	Louisville
	Kelly Faris	8	2012–13	Maryland
	Moriah Jefferson	8	2015–16	Tulane
	Moriah Jefferson	8	2015–16	Temple
	Breanna Stewart	8	2015–16	Robert Morris
	**Sarah Strong**	8	2026–27	Cornell
	**KK Arnold**	8	2023–24	Providence
	**KK Arnold**	8	2025–26	Providence

== Blocks ==
Career
Rk	Player	Blocks	Seasons
1	Breanna Stewart	414	2012–13 2013–14 2014–15 2015–16
2	Rebecca Lobo	396	1991–92 1992–93 1993–94 1994–95
3	Kara Wolters	370	1993–94 1994–95 1995–96 1996–97
4	Kiah Stokes	325	2011–12 2012–13 2013–14 2014–15
5	Tina Charles	304	2006–07 2007–08 2008–09 2009–10
6	Olivia Nelson-Ododa	262	2018–19 2019–20 2020–21 2021–22
7	Stefanie Dolson	254	2010–11 2011–12 2012–13 2013–14
8	Napheesa Collier	251	2015–16 2016–17 2017–18 2018–19
9	Maya Moore	204	2007–08 2008–09 2009–10 2010–11
10	Kelly Schumacher	181	1997–98 1998–99 1999–00 2000–01

Season
Rk	Player	Blocks	Season
1	Kiah Stokes	147	2014–15
2	Rebecca Lobo	131	1993–94
3	Breanna Stewart	126	2015–16
4	Rebecca Lobo	122	1994–95
5	Breanna Stewart	110	2013–14
6	Kara Wolters	105	1995–96
7	Breanna Stewart	104	2014–15
8	Olivia Nelson-Ododa	100	2019–20
9	Rebecca Lobo	97	1992–93
10	Kara Wolters	96	1996–97

Single game
Rk	Player	Blocks	Season	Opponent
1	Kiah Stokes	10	2014–15	East Carolina
2	Rebecca Lobo	9	1994–95	Seton Hall
	Kelly Schumacher	9	1999–2000	Tennessee
	Tina Charles	9	2006–07	Notre Dame
	Breanna Stewart	9	2015–16	SMU
6	Kara Wolters	8	1993–94	Providence
	Rebecca Lobo	8	1993–94	Seton Hall
	Rebecca Lobo	8	1994–95	Miami
	Kara Wolters	8	1994–95	Seton Hall
	Stefanie Dolson	8	2013–14	Texas A&M
	Olivia Nelson-Ododa	8	2021–22	Xavier

== See also ==
- UConn Huskies men's basketball statistical leaders
