= 2025–26 UConn Huskies women's basketball team =

Intercollegiate basketball season

2025–26 UConn Huskies women's basketball

Big East regular season and tournament champions

NCAA tournament, Final Four
- Conference: Big East Conference

Ranking
- Coaches: No. 3
- AP: No. 3
- Record: 38–1 (20–0 Big East)
- Head coach: Geno Auriemma (41st season)
- Associate head coach: Chris Dailey (41st season)
- Assistant coaches: Jamelle Elliott (6th season); Morgan Valley (5th season); Tonya Cardoza (3rd season)
- Home arena: Harry A. Gampel Pavilion; PeoplesBank Arena

2025–26 Big East women's basketball standings
	Conf.				Overall
Team	W		L	PCT	W		L	PCT
No. 3 UConn †	20	–	0	1.000	38	–	1	.974
Villanova	16	–	4	.800	25	–	8	.758
Seton Hall	12	–	8	.600	19	–	13	.594
Marquette	12	–	8	.600	18	–	12	.600
Creighton	11	–	9	.550	16	–	15	.516
St. John's	11	–	9	.550	22	–	12	.647
Providence	7	–	13	.350	15	–	18	.455
Butler	6	–	14	.300	12	–	19	.387
Georgetown	6	–	14	.300	14	–	17	.452
DePaul	5	–	15	.250	8	–	24	.250
Xavier	4	–	16	.200	11	–	19	.367
† 2026 Big East tournament winner Rankings from AP poll

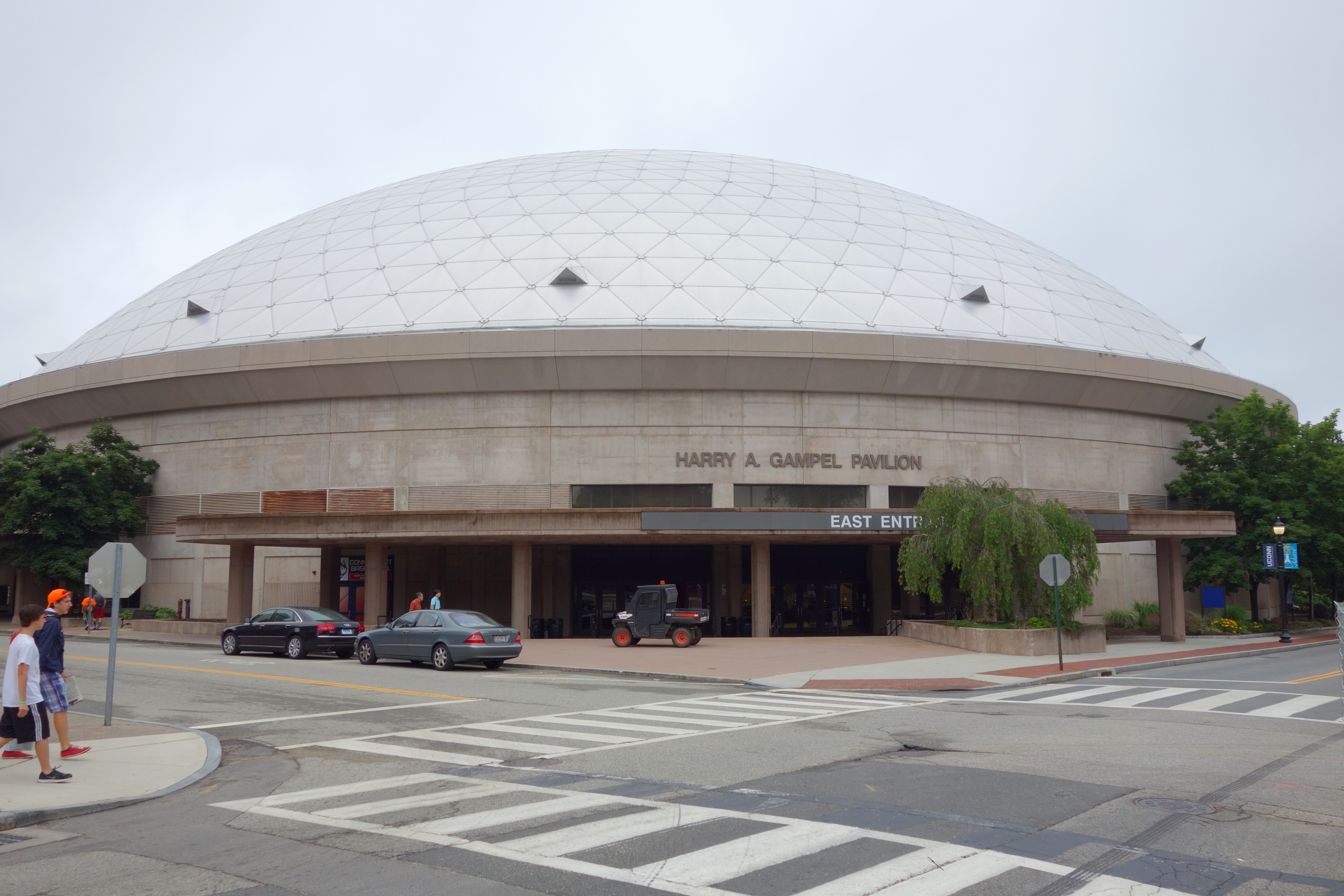
Harry A. Gampel Pavilion, where the Huskies played home games

The 2025–26 UConn Huskies women's basketball team represented the University of Connecticut (UConn) during the 2025–26 NCAA Division I women's basketball season. The Huskies were led by Hall of Fame head coach Geno Auriemma in his 41st season at UConn, and split their home games between Harry A. Gampel Pavilion on their campus in Storrs, Connecticut, and the PeoplesBank Arena in Hartford, Connecticut. UConn is a member of the Big East Conference, which it rejoined in the 2020-21 season. (Note: UConn had been a member of the original Big East Conference from 1979 through 2013, and one of the original women's basketball teams in that conference in 1982. The settlement of the 2013 split of the Big East Conference resulted in the so-called "Catholic 7" purchasing the "Big East" name and reorganizing as a new conference. The original conference charter was retained by the Division I FBS football schools that now operate as the American Athletic Conference. As part of the settlement, the current Big East recognizes the competitive history of the original conference in all sports that it sponsors.)

UConn returned this year as the reigning NCAA national champion. Three graduates were chosen in the 2025 WNBA draft, but the current roster returned All-American forward Sarah Strong and the national championship game's most outstanding player Azzi Fudd. Serah Williams and Kayleigh Heckel both chose to join this team via the transfer portal, and UConn had a strong recruiting year. For the first time since 2017, this year's Husky squad was ranked #1 in both preseason polls.

== Previous season ==
The Huskies finished the 2024–25 season 37–3 and 18–0 in Big East play to finish in first place. As the first seed in the Big East tournament, they earned a bye to the quarterfinals where they dominated the tournament. They received an automatic bid to the 2025 NCAA Division I women's basketball tournament where they were the second seed in the East Region. In the first round, they faced Arkansas State. They won this matchup, 103–34, to move on to the round of 32, where they routed 10th seed South Dakota State. UConn then faced #3 seeded Oklahoma, whom they defeated 82–59, advancing to the Elite Eight for the second consecutive season, and twenty-ninth overall under Hall of Fame head coach Geno Auriemma. After defeating #1 seed USC, 78–64, the Huskies advanced to their NCAA record, twenty-fourth Final Four appearance. Carrying that momentum, they would dominate #1 UCLA, 85–51, advancing to their 13th national championship appearance, and their first since 2022. Riding with momentum, they would go on to get revenge against South Carolina, 82–59, to capture their 12th national championship, surpassing the UCLA men's basketball program for most Division I basketball championships.

== Offseason ==
=== Departures ===
The Huskies graduated seniors Paige Bueckers, Kaitlyn Chen, and Aubrey Griffin from the 2024–25 roster. All were drafted into the Women's National Basketball Association. One undergraduate chose to enter the transfer portal after the NCAA tournament, sophomore Qadence Samuels.

UConn Departures
Name	Num	Pos.	Height	Year	Hometown	Reason for Departure
Paige Bueckers	5	G	6'0"	Graduate	Hopkins, MN	Graduated; drafted by the WNBA's Dallas Wings. Round 1, No. 1 overall
Qadence Samuels	10	G	6'0"	Sophomore	Forestville, MD	Transferred to NC State
Kaitlyn Chen	20	G	5'9"	Graduate	San Marino, CA	Graduated; drafted by the WNBA's Golden State Valkyries. Round 3, No. 30 overall
Aubrey Griffin	44	G	6'1"	Graduate	Ossining, NY	Graduated; drafted by the WNBA's Minnesota Lynx. Round 3, No. 37 overall

=== Incoming transfers ===
UConn incoming transfers
Name	Num	Pos.	Height	Year	Hometown	Previous school
Kayleigh Heckel	9	G	5'9"	Sophomore	Port Chester, NY	USC
Serah Williams	22	F	6'4"	Senior	Brooklyn, NY	Wisconsin

=== Recruiting class ===
==== 2025 recruiting class ====
ESPN ranked UConn's 2025 class as the sixth-best in the country.

College recruiting
Name	Hometown	School	Height	Weight	Commit date
Kelis Fisher; PG	Baltimore, MD	IMG Academy	5 ft 9 in (1.75 m)	N/A	
Kelis Fisher; PG	Recruit ratings: ESPN: (96)				
Gandy Malou-Mamel; C	Limerick, Ireland	Gill St. Bernard's School	6 ft 5 in (1.96 m)	N/A	
Gandy Malou-Mamel; C	Recruit ratings: ESPN: (92)				
Overall recruit ranking: ESPN: 6
Note: In many cases, Scout, Rivals, 247Sports, On3, and ESPN may conflict in their listings of height and weight.; In these cases, the average was taken. ESPN grades are on a 100-point scale.; Sources: "2025 Player Commits". ESPN. Archived from the original on January 20, 2025.

==== 2026 recruiting class ====
College recruiting
Name	Hometown	School	Height	Weight	Commit date
Olivia Vukoša; F	Whitestone, New York	Christ the King	6 ft 4 in (1.93 m)	N/A	
Olivia Vukoša; F	Recruit ratings: ESPN: (98)				
Overall recruit ranking:
Note: In many cases, Scout, Rivals, 247Sports, On3, and ESPN may conflict in their listings of height and weight.; In these cases, the average was taken. ESPN grades are on a 100-point scale.; Sources: "2026 Player Commits". ESPN. Archived from the original on October 22, 2025.

== Roster ==
2025–26 UConn Huskies women's basketball team
Players
Coaches

Pos.	#	Name	Height	Year	Previous school	Hometown
G	2	KK Arnold	5 ft 9 in (1.75 m)	Jr	Germantown	Germantown, WI
F	4	Blanca Quiñónez	6 ft 1 in (1.85 m)	Fr		Milagro, Ecuador
G	7	Kelis Fisher	5 ft 9 in (1.75 m)	Fr	IMG Academy	Baltimore, MD
C	8	Jana El-Alfy	6 ft 5 in (1.96 m)	RS So	Al Ahly SC	Cairo, Egypt
G	9	Kayleigh Heckel	5 ft 9 in (1.75 m)	So	USC	Port Chester, NY
G	11	Allie Ziebell	6 ft 0 in (1.83 m)	So	Neenah	Neenah, WI
G	12	Ashlynn Shade	5 ft 10 in (1.78 m)	Jr	La Lumiere	Noblesville, IN
F	21	Sarah Strong	6 ft 2 in (1.88 m)	So	Grace Christian	Fuquay-Varina, NC
F	22	Serah Williams	6 ft 4 in (1.93 m)	Sr	Wisconsin	Brooklyn, NY
G	23	Morgan Cheli	6 ft 2 in (1.88 m)	RS So	Archbishop Mitty	San Jose, CA
F	25	Ice Brady	6 ft 3 in (1.91 m)	RS Jr	Cathedral Catholic	San Diego, CA
G	33	Caroline Ducharme	6 ft 2 in (1.88 m)	RS Sr	Noble & Greenough	Milton, MA
F	34	Ayanna Patterson	6 ft 2 in (1.88 m)	RS So	Homestead	Fort Wayne, IN
G	35	Azzi Fudd	5 ft 11 in (1.8 m)	RS Sr	St. John's College HS	Arlington, VA
F	42	Gandy Malou-Mamel	6 ft 5 in (1.96 m)	Fr	Gill St. Bernard's	Limerick, Ireland

Head coach

- Geno Auriemma (West Chester)

Assistant coach(es)

- Chris Dailey (Rutgers)
- Jamelle Elliott (Connecticut)
- Morgan Valley (Connecticut)
- Tonya Cardoza (Virginia)

Legend

- (C) Team captain
- (S) Suspended
- (I) Ineligible
- (W) Walk-on
- Injured
- Current redshirt

Roster
Last update: April 6, 2026

== Schedule and results ==
Date time, TV	Rank^{#}	Opponent^{#}	Result	Record	High points	High rebounds	High assists	Site (attendance) city, state
Exhibition
October 13, 2025*; 2:00 p.m., NBCSB	No. 1	vs. Boston College; Hall of Fame Exhibition	W 84–67		20 – Fudd	5 – Tied	5 – Strong	Mohegan Sun Arena (6,012); Uncasville, CT
October 26, 2025*; 1:00 p.m., WWAX	No. 1	Southern Connecticut	W 105–39		21 – Fudd	10 – Strong	6 – Strong	PeoplesBank Arena (9,214); Hartford, CT
Regular season
November 4, 2025*; 5:30 p.m., ESPN	No. 1	vs. No. 20 Louisville; Armed Forces Classic	W 79–66	1–0	21 – Strong	9 – Strong	5 – Strong	Alumni Hall (3,640); Annapolis, MD
November 9, 2025*; 4:30 p.m., FS1	No. 1	Florida State; Championship banner unveiling	W 99–67	2–0	23 – Fudd	9 – Strong	5 – Fudd	Harry A. Gampel Pavilion (10,244); Storrs, CT
November 12, 2025*; 7:30 p.m., TruTV	No. 1	Loyola Chicago	W 85–31	3–0	11 – 2 Tied	9 – El Alfy	5 – Arnold	Harry A. Gampel Pavilion (10,244); Storrs, CT
November 16, 2025*; 12:00 p.m., Peacock	No. 1	Ohio State	W 100–68	4–0	29 – Strong	13 – Strong	7 – 2 Tied	PeoplesBank Arena (14,115); Hartford, CT
November 21, 2025*; 8:00 p.m., FOX	No. 1	vs. No. 6 Michigan; Basketball Hall of Fame Women's Showcase	W 72–69	5–0	31 – Fudd	20 – Strong	7 – Arnold	Mohegan Sun Arena (6,312); Uncasville, CT
November 23, 2025*; 2:30 p.m., FS1	No. 1	vs. Utah; Basketball Hall of Fame Women's Showcase	W 93–41	6–0	24 – Fudd	8 – 2 Tied	4 – 2 Tied	Mohegan Sun Arena (6,315); Uncasville, CT
November 30, 2025; 2:30 p.m., FS1	No. 1	at Xavier	W 104–39	7–0 (1–0)	16 – Ziebell	7 – Heckel	8 – Strong	Cintas Center (3,536); Cincinnati, OH
December 2, 2025*; 5:00 p.m., ESPN2	No. 1	at South Florida	W 85–51	8–0	14 – Strong	10 – Strong	4 – Strong	Yuengling Center (5,863); Tampa, FL
December 7, 2025; 1:00 p.m., FS1	No. 1	DePaul	W 102–35	9–0 (2–0)	20 – Strong	6 – Heckel	7 – Arnold	Harry A. Gampel Pavilion (10,244); Storrs, CT
December 13, 2025*; 5:30 p.m., FOX	No. 1	at No. 16 USC	W 79–51	10–0	17 – Fudd	9 – Williams	6 – Arnold	Galen Center (9,035); Los Angeles, CA
December 17, 2025; 7:00 p.m., NBCSN/Peacock	No. 1	Marquette	W 89–53	11–0 (3–0)	22 – Strong	7 – 2 Tied	6 – Heckel	PeoplesBank Arena (12,348); Hartford, CT
December 20, 2025*; 1:30 p.m., FOX	No. 1	vs. No. 11 Iowa; Shark Beauty Women's Champions Classic	W 90–64	12–0	27 – Fudd	7 – Strong	6 – Arnold	Barclays Center (10,107); Brooklyn, NY
December 28, 2025; 4:00 p.m., TNT/TruTV	No. 1	at Butler	W 94–47	13–0 (4–0)	15 – Strong	6 – Strong	7 – Strong	Hinkle Fieldhouse (5,626); Indianapolis, IN
December 31, 2025; 3:00 p.m., NBCSN/Peacock	No. 1	at Providence	W 90–53	14–0 (5–0)	18 – Fudd	7 – Strong	6 – Fudd	Amica Mutual Pavilion (5,240); Providence, RI
January 3, 2026; 12:00 p.m., FS1	No. 1	Seton Hall	W 84–48	15–0 (6–0)	18 – Strong	8 – Strong	5 – Arnold	PeoplesBank Arena (15,495); Hartford, CT
January 7, 2026; 7:30 p.m., TruTV	No. 1	St. John's	W 88–43	16–0 (7–0)	24 – Strong	3 – 4 Tied	5 – 2 Tied	PeoplesBank Arena (13,229); Hartford, CT
January 11, 2026; 2:00 p.m., TruTV	No. 1	at Creighton	W 95–54	17–0 (8–0)	18 – Strong	13 – Strong	6 – 2 Tied	CHI Health Center (6,372); Omaha, NE
January 15, 2026; 7:00 p.m., FS1	No. 1	Villanova	W 99–50	18–0 (9–0)	24 – Strong	9 – Strong	7 – Arnold	Harry A. Gampel Pavilion (10,244); Storrs, CT
January 19, 2026*; 5:00 p.m., FOX	No. 1	Notre Dame; Rivalry	W 85–47	19–0	18 – Strong	11 – Strong	5 – Arnold	Harry A. Gampel Pavilion (10,244); Storrs, CT
January 22, 2026; 7:30 p.m., TNT/TruTV	No. 1	at Georgetown	W 83–42	20–0 (10–0)	25 – Strong	8 – Strong	5 – 2 Tied	CareFirst Arena (3,846); Washington, D.C.
January 24, 2026 (Note: Originally scheduled for January 25, but was moved due to inclement weather.); 12:00 p.m., NBCSN/Peacock	No. 1	at Seton Hall	W 92–52	21–0 (11–0)	17 – Strong	6 – Strong	5 – Strong	Walsh Gymnasium (1,202); South Orange, NJ
January 28, 2026; 8:00 p.m., Peacock	No. 1	Xavier; Play4Kay Pink Game	W 97–39	22–0 (12–0)	34 – Ziebell	8 – Heckel	8 – Heckel	Harry A. Gampel Pavilion (10,244); Storrs, CT
February 1, 2026*; 12:00 p.m., FOX	No. 1	No. 15 Tennessee; Rivalry	W 96–66	23–0	27 – Fudd	9 – Strong	7 – Fudd	PeoplesBank Arena (15,495); Hartford, CT
February 4, 2026; 8:00 p.m., TruTV	No. 1	at DePaul	W 86–40	24–0 (13–0)	25 – Fudd	6 – Strong	6 – 2 Tied	Wintrust Arena (6,277); Chicago, IL
February 7, 2026; 12:00 p.m., FS1	No. 1	Butler	W 80–48	25–0 (14–0)	17 – Fudd	11 – El Alfy	5 – Shade	PeoplesBank Arena (13,811); Hartford, CT
February 11, 2026; 7:00 p.m., NBCSN/Peacock	No. 1	Creighton	W 94–44	26–0 (15–0)	20 – Ziebell	5 – Tied	4 – Tied	Harry A. Gampel Pavilion (10,244); Storrs, CT
February 14, 2026; 1:00 p.m., FS1	No. 1	at Marquette	W 71–56	27–0 (16–0)	25 – Fudd	6 – Arnold	9 – Arnold	Al McGuire Center (3,953); Milwaukee, WI
February 18, 2026; 7:00 p.m., Peacock	No. 1	at Villanova	W 83–69	28–0 (17–0)	25 – Fudd	12 – Strong	6 – Arnold	Finneran Pavilion (3,719); Villanova, PA
February 22, 2026; 12:00 p.m., FS1	No. 1	Providence; Senior Day	W 81–38	29–0 (18–0)	13 – Tied	16 – El Alfy	10 – Arnold	Harry A. Gampel Pavilion (10,244); Storrs, CT
February 26, 2026; 7:00 p.m., TNT/TruTV	No. 1	Georgetown	W 84–52	30–0 (19–0)	24 – Fudd	11 – Strong	7 – Strong	PeoplesBank Arena (14,088); Hartford, CT
March 1, 2026; 7:30 p.m., TNT/TruTV	No. 1	at St. John's	W 85–49	31–0 (20–0)	14 – Fudd	7 – Strong	4 – Tied	Madison Square Garden (9,612); New York, NY
Big East tournament
March 7, 2026; 12:00 p.m., Peacock/NBCSN	(1) No. 1	vs. (8) Georgetown; Quarterfinals	W 84–39	32–0	14 – Williams	8 – Williams	6 – Shade	Mohegan Sun Arena; Uncasville, CT
March 8, 2026; 2:30 p.m., Peacock/NBCSN	(1) No. 1	vs. (5) Creighton; Semifinals	W 100–51	33–0	23 – Strong	8 – Heckel	7 – Heckel	Mohegan Sun Arena; Uncasville, CT
March 9, 2026; 7:00 p.m., Peacock/NBCSN	(1) No. 1	vs. (2) Villanova; Championship	W 90–51	34–0	19 – Fudd	9 – El Alfy	7 – Arnold	Mohegan Sun Arena; Uncasville, CT
NCAA tournament
March 21, 2026*; 3:00 p.m., ABC	(1 FW1) No. 1	(16 FW1) UTSA; First Round	W 90–52	35–0	18 – Strong	7 – Shade	5 – Heckel	Harry A. Gampel Pavillion (10,244); Storrs, CT
March 23, 2026*; 6:00 p.m., ESPN	(1 FW1) No. 1	(9 FW1) Syracuse; Second Round/Rivalry	W 98–45	36–0	34 – Fudd	9 – Strong	5 – Tied	Harry A. Gampel Pavillion (10,244); Storrs, CT
March 27, 2026*; 5:00 p.m., ESPN	(1 FW1) No. 1	vs. (4 FW1) No. 15 North Carolina; Sweet Sixteen	W 63–42	37–0	21 – Strong	10 – Strong	5 – Fudd	Dickies Arena (9,375); Fort Worth, TX
March 29, 2026*; 1:00 p.m., ABC	(1 FW1) No. 1	vs. (6 FW1) No. 22 Notre Dame; Elite Eight/Rivalry	W 70–52	38–0	21 – Strong	8 – Quiñonez	4 – Tied	Dickies Arena (11,335); Fort Worth, TX
April 3, 2026*; 7:00 p.m., ESPN	(1 FW1) No. 1	vs. (1 S4) No. 4 South Carolina; Final Four	L 48–62	38–1	12 – Strong	12 – Strong	5 – Fudd	Mortgage Matchup Center (15,856); Phoenix, AZ
*Non-conference game. ^{#}Rankings from AP Poll. (#) Tournament seedings in parentheses. FW1=Fort Worth 1. S4=Sacramento 4. All times are in Eastern Time.

== Player statistics ==
Player	Games Played	Minutes	Field Goals	Three Pointers	Free Throws	Rebounds	Assists	Blocks	Steals	Points
Azzi Fudd	39	1114	257	117	42	101	122	18	98	673
Ashlynn Shade	39	1050	118	47	14	139	110	3	69	297
Sarah Strong	37	1036	279	69	80	293	146	62	130	699
KK Arnold	38	933	98	19	48	82	174	5	102	263
Kaleigh Heckel	39	731	110	18	31	109	108	4	56	269
Allie Ziebell	39	703	99	58	26	63	48	12	37	282
Serah Williams	38	661	107	0	40	129	52	42	20	254
Blanca Quinonez	31	631	133	34	33	97	66	15	63	333
Jana El-Alfy	35	403	59	0	23	145	30	12	6	141
Caroline Ducharme	25	188	13	4	6	44	21	5	7	36
Kelis Fisher	30	173	33	0	15	22	19	1	9	81
Ayanna Patterson	30	150	17	0	18	42	3	4	2	52
Ice Brady	2	23	2	0	1	6	1	0	1	5
Gandy Malou-Mamel	2	4	1	0	0	0	0	0	0	2
Total	39	7800	1326	358	509	1465	905	192	607	3387
Opponents	39	7800	707	239	313	1248	422	90	242	1966

== Rankings ==
Ranking movements Legend: ██ Increase in ranking ██ Decrease in ranking ( ) = First-place votes
	Week																				
Poll	Pre	1	2	3	4	5	6	7	8	9	10	11	12	13	14	15	16	17	18	19	Final
AP	1 (27)	1 (30)	1 (28)	1 (30)	1 (22)	1 (23)	1 (24)	1 (25)	1 (25)*	1 (28)	1 (32)	1 (32)	1 (31)	1 (31)	1 (31)	1 (31)	1 (31)	1 (31)	1 (28)	1 (28)	3
Coaches	1 (28)	1 (29)	1 (28)	1 (29)	1 (28)	1 (28)	1 (28)	1 (28)	1 (28)	1 (28)	1 (31)	1 (31)	1 (31)	1 (31)	1 (31)	1 (31)	1 (31)	1 (31)	1 (30)	1 (30)	3

*AP did not release a week 8 poll.

== See also ==
- 2025–26 UConn Huskies men's basketball team
