= Nika Mühl =

Croatian basketball player (born 2001)

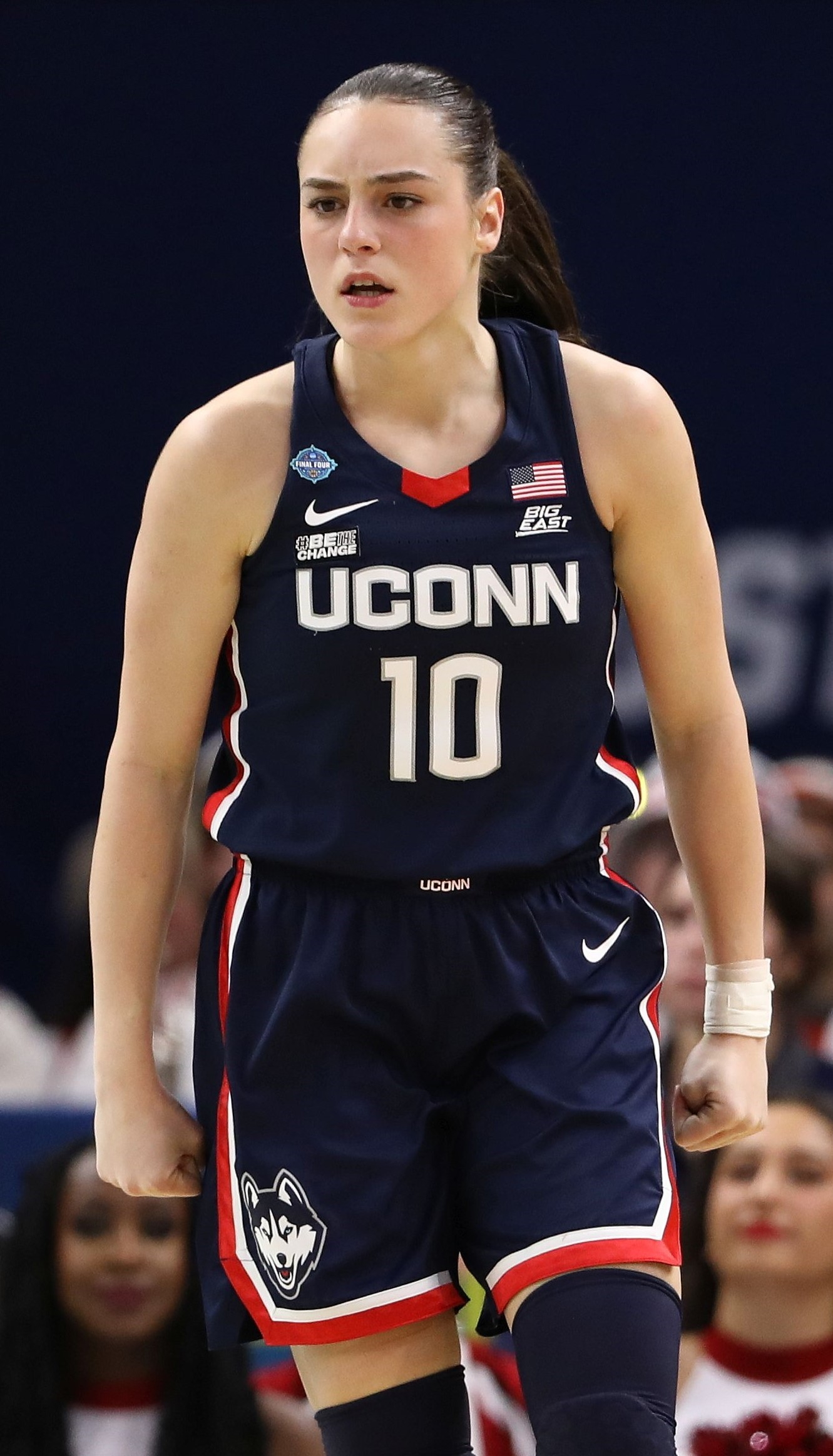
- Mühl with UConn in 2022

No. 1 – Sopron Basket
- Position: Point guard
- League: Nemzeti Bajnokság I/A

Personal information
- Born: 9 April 2001 (age 25) Zagreb, Croatia
- Listed height: 183 cm (6 ft 0 in)
- Listed weight: 70.8 kg (156 lb)

Career information
- High school: III Gymnasium Zagreb (Zagreb)
- College: UConn (2020–2024)
- WNBA draft: 2024: 2nd round, 14th overall pick
- Drafted by: Seattle Storm
- Playing career: 2024–present

Career history
- 2016–2020: ŽKK Trešnjevka 2009
- 2024–2025: Seattle Storm
- 2024: Beşiktaş JK
- 2025–present: Sopron Basket
- 2026–present: Portland Fire

Career highlights
- 2× Big East Defensive Player of the Year (2022, 2023); 2× Second-team All-Big East (2023, 2024); All-WABA League Second team (2019); UConn career assist record (686); UConn single season assist record (284, 2022-23); UConn most double-digit assist games (17); UConn single-game assist record (15)
- Stats at Basketball Reference

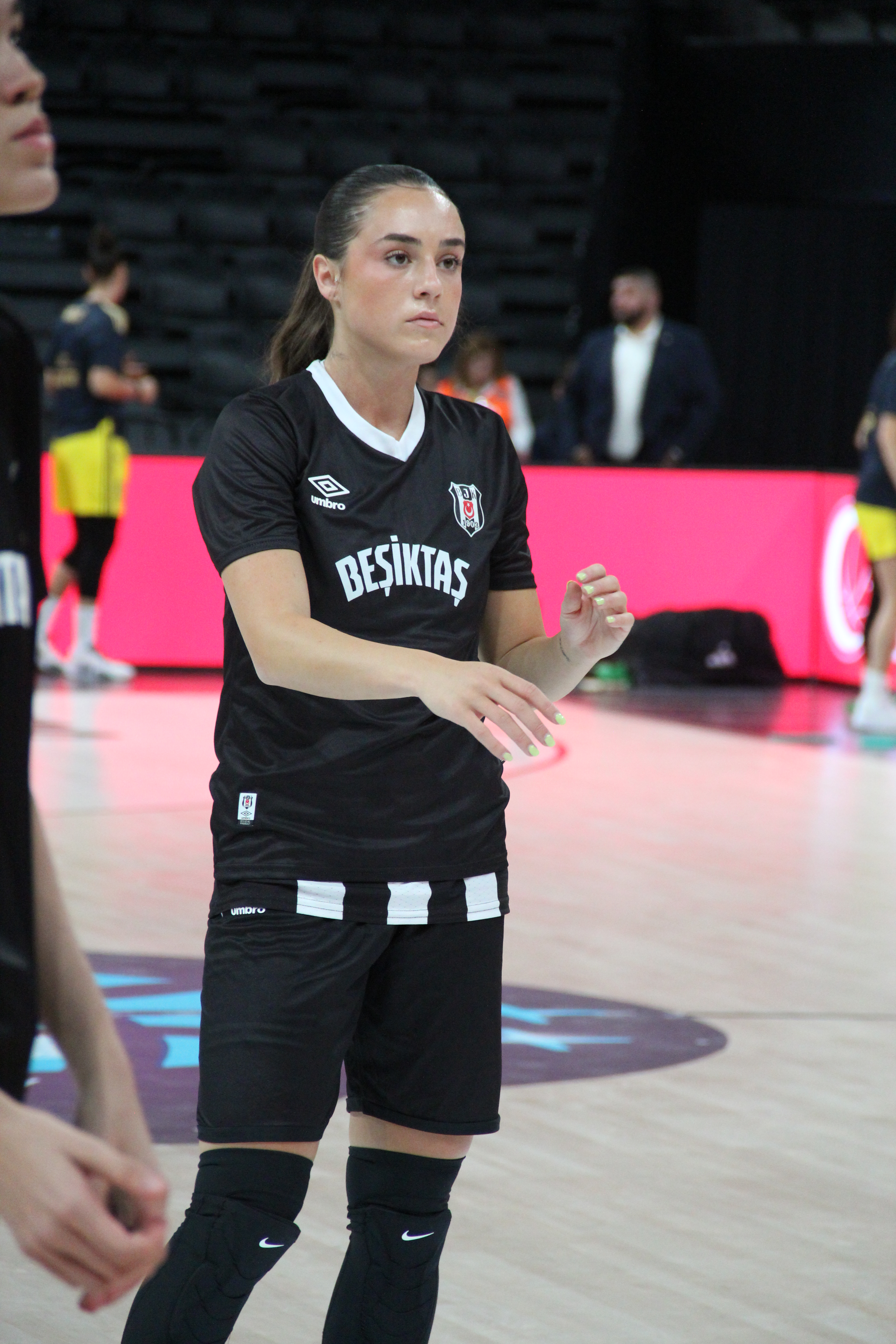
Mühl with Beşiktaş JK in 2024

Nika Mühl (/mjuːl/ MEWL; born 9 April 2001) is a Croatian professional basketball player for the Portland Fire of the Women's National Basketball Association (WNBA) and for Sopron Basket of the Nemzeti Bajnokság I/A. She played college basketball as a point guard for the UConn Huskies. Twice named Big East Conference Defensive Player of the Year while in college, Mühl is UConn's all-time leader in career assists, with 686, and also holds the program records for most assists in a single season (284, set in 2022–23) and in a single game (15 against NC State on 20 November 2022). She was selected 14th overall by Seattle in the 2024 WNBA draft and also plays for Beşiktaş JK of the Women's Basketball Super League in Turkey.

== Early life ==
Mühl was born in Zagreb to parents Roberta and Darko Mühl, both of whom played basketball. She has one younger sister, Hana Mühl. Nika Mühl attended the III Gymnasium Zagreb.

=== ŽKK Trešnjevka 2009 ===
Mühl played four seasons for ŽKK Trešnjevka 2009 in the Croatian Prva Ženska Liga, from 2016 to 2020. She appeared in 24 games in the Prva liga in her first season, averaging 6.4 points, 4.2 rebounds and 2.8 assists. The following season she averaged 9.2 points, 6.9 rebounds and 5.0 assists in the Prva Ženska Liga and 11.7 points, 5.8 rebounds and 4.5 assists in the Women Adriatic Basketball Association (WABA).

In 2018–2019, she averaged 10.0, 7.9 and 6.2 assists in the Prva Ženska Liga and 11.7 points, 7.7 rebounds and 6.2 assists in the WABA. She continued her stellar performance with Trešnjevka during the 2019–2020 season; Mühl averaged 8.6 points and 7.1 assists in the Prva Ženska Liga and 11.7 points and 7.2 assists in the WABA.

== College career ==
=== Recruiting ===
Mühl received scholarship offers from several NCAA Division I basketball programs, including Oregon, Ohio State, Louisville, and South Florida. On 8 April 2019, Mühl announced her commitment to the University of Connecticut. She credited Coach Geno Auriemma's personal trip to Croatia as one reason for her decision: “He was the first one to visit. He made me think that he really cared and that he really wanted me there.” On 13 November 2019, Mühl signed a National Letter of Intent with UConn.

=== Freshman ===
During her freshman season, Mühl averaged 5.0 points, 2.7 assists, 2.4 rebounds, and 1.8 steals across 22 games. She made 14 consecutive starts. On 25 February 2021, she scored a season high 19 points in an 81-49 victory against Creighton. In UConn’s first game against High Point in the NCAA Tournament, Mühl rolled her ankle and needed to be helped off the court. She missed the next three games and was unable to return to form in the Final Four.

=== Sophomore ===
Mühl was named Big East Defensive Player of the Year for the 2021–22 season after averaging 2.2 steals per game, second best in the Big East, and headlining the Huskies defense which allowed a league best of 50.8 points per game against conference opponents.

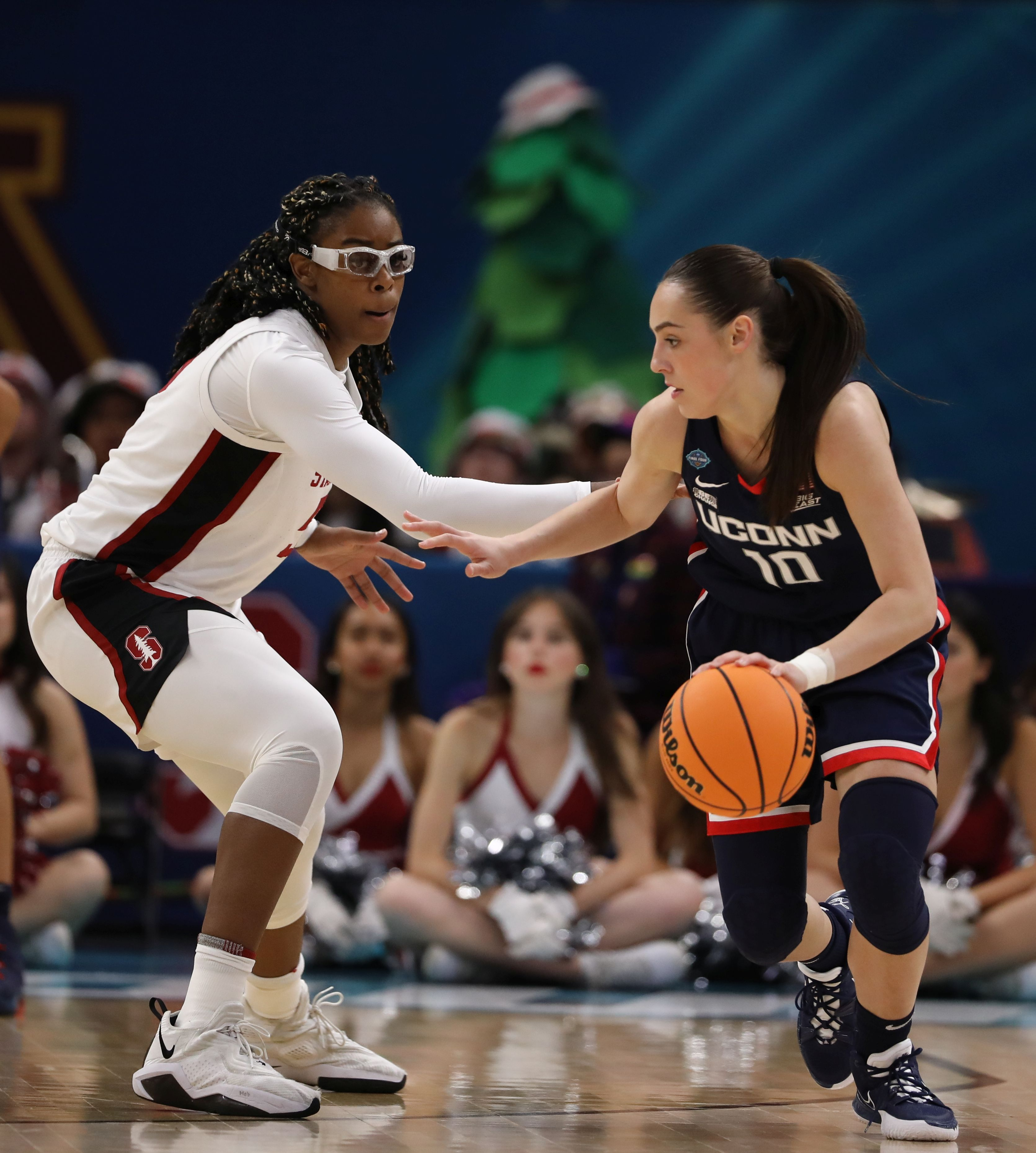
Mühl guarded by Stanford's Fran Belibi during the 2022 NCAA Final Four

=== Junior ===
With teammate Paige Bueckers out for the season due to a torn ACL, SB Nation's Daniel Connolly wrote that Mühl had become UConn's "most important player as the team's only true point guard with no obvious options behind her." Mühl took on the role of leader on both the defensive and offensive end. On 20 November 2022, she set the program record for most assists in a single game with 15 against NC State, a record held previously by Bueckers. She led the nation in assists per game for most of the 2022–23 season, only finishing behind Caitlin Clark by 0.2 assists. In the final regular-season game against Xavier, Mühl recorded seven assists to bring her season total to 236, five more than the single-season school record set by Sue Bird in 2002. Starting throughout UConn's three games in the Big East Tournament and three more in the NCAA Women's Basketball Tournament, Mühl finished the season with 284 assists. Mühl's was announced as a top 10 candidate for the 2023 Nancy Lieberman award honoring the top point guard in Division 1 college basketball.

=== Senior ===
In Mühl's senior season at UConn, she played 39 games, all as a starter, averaging 32.1 minutes per game. Her field goal percentage was 46.2%, with a three-point shooting percentage of 40.2%. Over the course of the season, Mühl averaged 6.9 points, 6.5 assists, and 4.0 rebounds per game, along with 1.3 steals. Her performance earned her a spot on the All-Big East second team. Mühl broke UConn's all-time career assist record during UConn's second round game against Syracuse with her 660th assist on a pass to Ashlynn Shade. The record was previously held by Moriah Jefferson (659). Mühl would finish her UConn career with 686 assists. Mühl would have back-to-back seasons of 200+ assists as she would finish her senior season with 253 assists.

In the 2024 Final Four tournament game against Iowa on 5 April 2024, Mühl had the primary responsibility of guarding Iowa player Caitlin Clark. Mühl finished her final college game with 9 points, 7 assists, and 5 rebounds and played all 40 minutes. Prior to the start of the Big East tournament, Mühl announced on social media that she would forgo her final year of eligibility from the COVID-19 extension.

== Professional career ==
=== WNBA ===
Mühl was asked to attend the 2024 WNBA draft in person, and was selected in the second round as the 14th pick overall by the Seattle Storm. On 13 May, the team announced that Mühl had made the final roster for the 2024 Seattle Storm season.

Mühl made her WNBA debut on 22 May 2024, recording three minutes played and two rebounds. She had missed the first four games of the season having issues converting her student visa into a P1A work visa. While Mühl saw limited in-game minutes as a rookie, she acknowledged her lack of playing time was a result of having to "earn [her] spot" in a rotation that featured several experienced veterans and star players, while her Storm teammates and head coach Noelle Quinn praised her work ethic in practice as she adapted to the professional level. On 19 September, Mühl played a season-high 14 minutes in the Storm's regular-season finale against the Phoenix Mercury, scoring her first career points off of a steal with 4:40 left in the game.

On 18 April 2025, the Storm confirmed Mühl would miss the entire 2025 WNBA season due to a torn ACL suffered while playing for Beşiktaş in October 2024.

On 1 April 2026, the Storm confirmed Mühl would miss the 2026 WNBA season with another torn ACL, suffered while playing in EuroBasket qualifiers. On 3 April, she was drafted 24th overall by the Portland Fire in the 2026 WNBA expansion draft.

=== KBSL ===
On 31 May 2024, Turkish club Beşiktaş J.K. announced that Mühl would be joining the team for the 2024–25 season in the KBSL. Late in the third quarter of a game against Fenerbahçe S.K. on 3 October, Mühl suffered an ACL and meniscus tear, prematurely ending her season. Prior to her injury, Mühl played 28 minutes, with 11 points, 9 assists, and 3 rebounds while on the court. Fenerbahçe went on to win the game 79-63 over Beşiktaş. Mühl underwent surgery on 1 November to repair the torn ACL and meniscus.

=== NB I/A ===
Mühl signed with Sopron Basket of the Nemzeti Bajnokság I/A for the 2025–26 season.

== National team career ==
Mühl represented Croatia at the 2018 FIBA U18 European Championship, averaging 10.9 points, 5.7 assists, and 5.0 rebounds per game. Croatia would finish third in Group A with a plus 3 point differential. Croatia would lose in the Round of 16 to Hungary 63-58. Croatia would go on to defeat Bosnia & Herzegovina, Poland, and Italy to finish in 9th place overall.

== Career statistics ==
Legend
GP	Games played	GS	Games started	MPG	Minutes per game	FG%	Field goal percentage	3P%	3-point field goal percentage
FT%	Free throw percentage	RPG	Rebounds per game	APG	Assists per game	SPG	Steals per game	BPG	Blocks per game
TO	Turnovers per game	PPG	Points per game	**Bold**	Career high	°	League leader	*	Led Division I

=== WNBA ===
==== Regular season ====
WNBA regular season statistics
Year	Team	GP	GS	MPG	FG%	3P%	FT%	RPG	APG	SPG	BPG	TO	PPG
2024	Seattle	16	0	3.6	.071	.000	–	0.6	0.4	0.1	–	0.3	0.1
2025	Did not play (injury)												
**Career**		16	0	3.6	.071	.000	–	0.6	0.4	0.1	–	0.3	0.1

=== College ===
NCAA statistics
Year	Team	GP	GS	MPG	FG%	3P%	FT%	RPG	APG	SPG	BPG	TO	PPG
2020–21	UConn	23	15	24.4	.381	.343	.727	2.4	2.7	**1.7**	**0.2**	1.9	4.9
2021–22	UConn	33	19	21.7	.431	.342	.222	3.0	2.6	1.4	**0.2**	1.5	3.8
2022–23	UConn	36	36	**36.6**	.412	.343	**.729**	3.9	**7.9**	1.5	0.1	1.4	**7.1**
2023–24	UConn	**39**	**39**	32.1	**.462**	**.402**	.571	**4.0**	6.5	1.3	**0.2**	**2.6**	6.9
**Career**		131	109	29.4	.427	.362	.658	3.5	5.2	1.4	0.2	1.9	5.8

== Off the court ==
=== Personal life ===
Her sister Hana plays basketball as well, she previously played for Ball State University and currently plays for Manhattan University. Other than her native Croatian, Mühl speaks English fluently and can speak limited German.

In April 2024, Mühl attended Kelsey Plum's second annual Dawg Class, a 3-day camp to help top women college athletes transition from collegiate to professional basketball. The 2024 camp was held at the IMG Academy and sponsored by Under Armour.

GQ Sports named Mühl the WNBA's best dressed rookie of the 2024 season. She was also named the WNBA's most stylish player in a fan voted contest on their Instagram.

=== Endorsements ===
On 12 September 2024, Mühl announced via Instagram she would be a Mazda brand partner. She featured in televised commercials for the company while being highlighted across their social media channels. Mühl has also featured in partnerships with Smartwater and Ulta Beauty.

On 4 March 2025, Under Armour uploaded a teaser to their social media featuring a new athlete that would be joining the brand. Mühl was officially announced the next day, 5 March, as their newest signing.

== Awards and honors ==
College

- Big East Defensive Player of the Year (2022)
- Big East Defensive Player of the Year (2023)
- All-Big East Second Team (2023, 2024)
- AP All-America Honorable Mention (2023, 2024)
- Big East All-Tournament Team (2024)
