= 2006–07 Connecticut Huskies women's basketball team =

Intercollegiate basketball season

2006–07 Connecticut Huskies women's basketball

Big East regular season champions

NCAA tournament, Elite Eight
- Conference: Big East Conference

Ranking
- Coaches: No. 5
- AP: No. 4
- Record: 32–4 (16–0 Big East)
- Head coach: Geno Auriemma
- Associate head coach: Chris Dailey
- Assistant coach: Jamelle Elliott
- Home arena: Harry A. Gampel Pavilion

2006–07 Big East Conference women's basketball standings
	Conf.				Overall
Team	W		L	PCT	W		L	PCT
No. 4 Connecticut	16	–	0	1.000	32	–	4	.889
No. 22 Marquette	12	–	4	.750	26	–	7	.788
No. 15 Rutgers †	12	–	4	.750	27	–	9	.750
West Virginia	11	–	5	.688	21	–	11	.656
No. 25 Louisville	10	–	6	.625	27	–	8	.771
Pittsburgh	10	–	6	.625	24	–	9	.727
Notre Dame	10	–	6	.625	20	–	12	.625
South Florida	9	–	7	.563	21	–	12	.636
Seton Hall	9	–	7	.563	19	–	12	.613
DePaul	8	–	8	.500	19	–	13	.594
Cincinnati	6	–	10	.375	15	–	14	.517
St. John's	4	–	12	.250	8	–	20	.286
Georgetown	3	–	13	.188	13	–	16	.448
Providence	3	–	13	.188	13	–	16	.448
Syracuse	3	–	13	.188	9	–	20	.310
Villanova	2	–	14	.125	8	–	21	.276
† 2007 Big East Tournament winner Rankings from AP poll

The 2006–07 Connecticut Huskies women's basketball team represented the University of Connecticut in the 2006–07 NCAA Division I women's basketball season. Coached by Geno Auriemma, the Huskies played their home games at the Hartford Civic Center in Hartford, Connecticut, and on campus at the Harry A. Gampel Pavilion in Storrs, Connecticut, and were a member of the Big East Conference. They returned the Elite Eight of the NCAA tournament, and finished the season 32–4 (16–0 Big East).

== Roster ==
2006–07 Connecticut Huskies women's basketball team
Players
Coaches

Pos.	#	Name	Height	Year	Previous school	Hometown
C	31	Tina Charles	6 ft 4 in (1.93 m)	Fr	Christ the King	Jamaica, N.Y.
G	13	Jacquie Fernandes	5 ft 9 in (1.75 m)	Fr	Heritage Christian	Pawcatuck, Conn.
F	22	Meghan Gardler	6 ft 0 in (1.83 m)	Fr	Cardinal O'Hara	Springfield, Pa.
G	32	Kalana Greene	5 ft 10 in (1.78 m)	Fr	Timberland	Saint Stephen, South Carolina
F/C	51	Cassie Kerns	6 ft 3 in (1.91 m)	So	Valparaiso	Valparaiso, Ind.
F	41	Kaili McLaren	6 ft 2 in (1.88 m)	Fr	Our Lady of Good Counsel	Washington, D.C.
G	20	Renee Montgomery	5 ft 7 in (1.7 m)	So	South Charleston	St. Albans, West Virginia
G	2	Tahirah Williams	6 ft 0 in (1.83 m)	So	Immaculate Heart Academy	Montclair, New Jersey

Head coach

Geno Auriemma

Assistant coach(es)

Chris Dailey
Jamelle Elliott

Legend

- (C) Team captain
- (S) Suspended
- (I) Ineligible
- (W) Walk-on
- Injured
- Current redshirt

Roster

== Schedule ==
Date time, TV	Rank^{#}	Opponent^{#}	Result	Record	Site (attendance) city, state
Regular season
Big East tournament
Mar 6, 2007*	(1) No. 2	(2) No. 18 Rutgers; Championship game	L 47–55	29–3	Hartford Civic Center; Hartford, CT
NCAA tournament
Mar 24, 2007*	(1 FRS) No. 4	vs. (4 FRS) No. 18 NC State; Regional Semifinal – Sweet Sixteen	W 78–71	32–3	Save Mart Center; Fresno, CA
Mar 26, 2007*	(1 FRS) No. 4	vs. (3 FRS) No. 12 LSU; Regional Final – Elite Eight	L 50–73	32–4	Save Mart Center; Fresno, CA
*Non-conference game. ^{#}Rankings from AP Poll. (#) Tournament seedings in parentheses. FRS=Fresno Region. All times are in Eastern Time.

== See also ==
- 2006–07 Connecticut Huskies men's basketball team
