= Gandy Malou-Mamel =

Irish basketball player (born 2005)

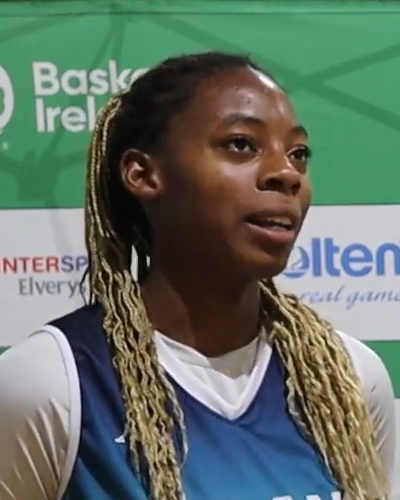
- Malou-Mamel in 2023

No. 42 – UConn Huskies
- Position: Center
- League: Big East Conference

Personal information
- Born: December 31, 2005 (age 20) Limerick, Ireland
- Listed height: 6 ft 5 in (1.96 m)

Career information
- High school: Gill St. Bernard's (Gladstone, New Jersey)
- College: UConn (2025–present)

Gandy Malou-Mamel (born December 31, 2005) is an Irish college basketball player for the UConn Huskies.

== Early life ==
Malou-Mamel was born on December 31, 2005, in Limerick, Ireland, where she was raised. She was the oldest of five children born to parents Yves and Giselle, who each came separately to Ireland from the Democratic Republic of Congo as refugees fleeing the Second Congo War. They later met at a social event for Congolese immigrants in Limerick.

Malou-Mamel grew up playing soccer as a goalkeeper, and did not begin playing basketball until age 12. She was introduced to the sport when a coach from a local club, Limerick Celtics, visited her school. "I was in a shirt and a tie but it was very fun", Malou-Mamel said. "I enjoyed it because I loved blocking people. I felt it suited me more than soccer and immediately switched sports." She helped the Limerick Celtics win multiple youth titles, most notably the U18 Women's National Cup. She also attended Castletroy College, reaching two All-Ireland schools finals with the basketball team.

== High school career ==
Malou-Mamel moved to the United States in August 2022 with the help of former Ireland men's international Kieran Quinn, who saw her while watching highlights of another player before flying to Limerick to meet her and her family. She enrolled at Gill St. Bernard's School ahead of her sophomore year. Malou-Mamel was a three-year starter on the school's basketball team. As a sophomore, she averaged 7.4 points, 6.9 rebounds, and 2.2 blocks per game. As a junior, Malou-Mamel averaged 16.5 points, 9.6 rebounds, and 2.6 blocks per game, earning second-team all-state honors from NJ.com. On February 8, 2025, as a senior, she scored her 1,000th career point in a 67–35 win over Mount St. Mary. Malou-Mamel finished her final high school season with averages of 17.1 points, 10.2 rebounds, and 2.2 blocks per game. She garnered first-team all-state honors. Malou-Mamel was also named the Skyland Conference Player of the Year, as well as the Central Jersey Sports Radio Somerset County Player of the Year. Additionally, she played on the Amateur Athletic Union (AAU) circuit for the NJ Shoreshots and the Jersey Gemz.

=== Recruiting ===
Malou-Mamel was rated as a four-star recruit, as well as the 75th- and 77th-best overall recruit in the class of 2025, according to ESPN and 247Sports, respectively. She was spotted by UConn Huskies head coach Geno Auriemma at an EYBL tournament in Dallas in May 2023. Malou-Mamel was offered a scholarship in June and committed to UConn in July. She signed with the Huskies later that year. "Gandy is in some ways raw, but she has a couple characteristics that are really valuable," Auriemma said in the announcement. "She runs the floor great, and she wants to play defense and rebound the ball."

== College career ==
Malou-Mamel arrived at UConn for her freshman year "as a project, a rare and raw 6-foot-5 center with an endless ceiling", as described by CT Insider. She made her collegiate debut on November 12, 2025, briefly coming off the bench in an 85–31 blowout win over Loyola–Chicago, and scored her first basket in her second game, making a layup in the final minute of another blowout win over Xavier on November 30.

== National team career ==
Malou-Mamel earned a call-up to the Ireland national under-17 team as a schoolgirl. She later represented the Ireland under-20 team at the 2024 FIBA U20 Women's EuroBasket Division B, where she averaged 10.6 points and 10.0 rebounds per game as she helped Ireland finish in fifth place.

Malou-Mamel debuted for the Ireland senior national team on August 12, 2023, making a brief appearance in a 73–67 friendly win against Austria at the National Basketball Arena.

== Personal life ==
Malou-Mamel has three brothers and one sister. While in high school, she initially boarded with Kieran Quinn's family in Verona, New Jersey, before moving in with the family of another former Irish international, Rob Gibbons, in Mendham Township, New Jersey, ahead of her junior year.

Malou-Mamel is the first Irish player in UConn women's basketball history.
