= Geno Auriemma =

American basketball coach (born 1954)

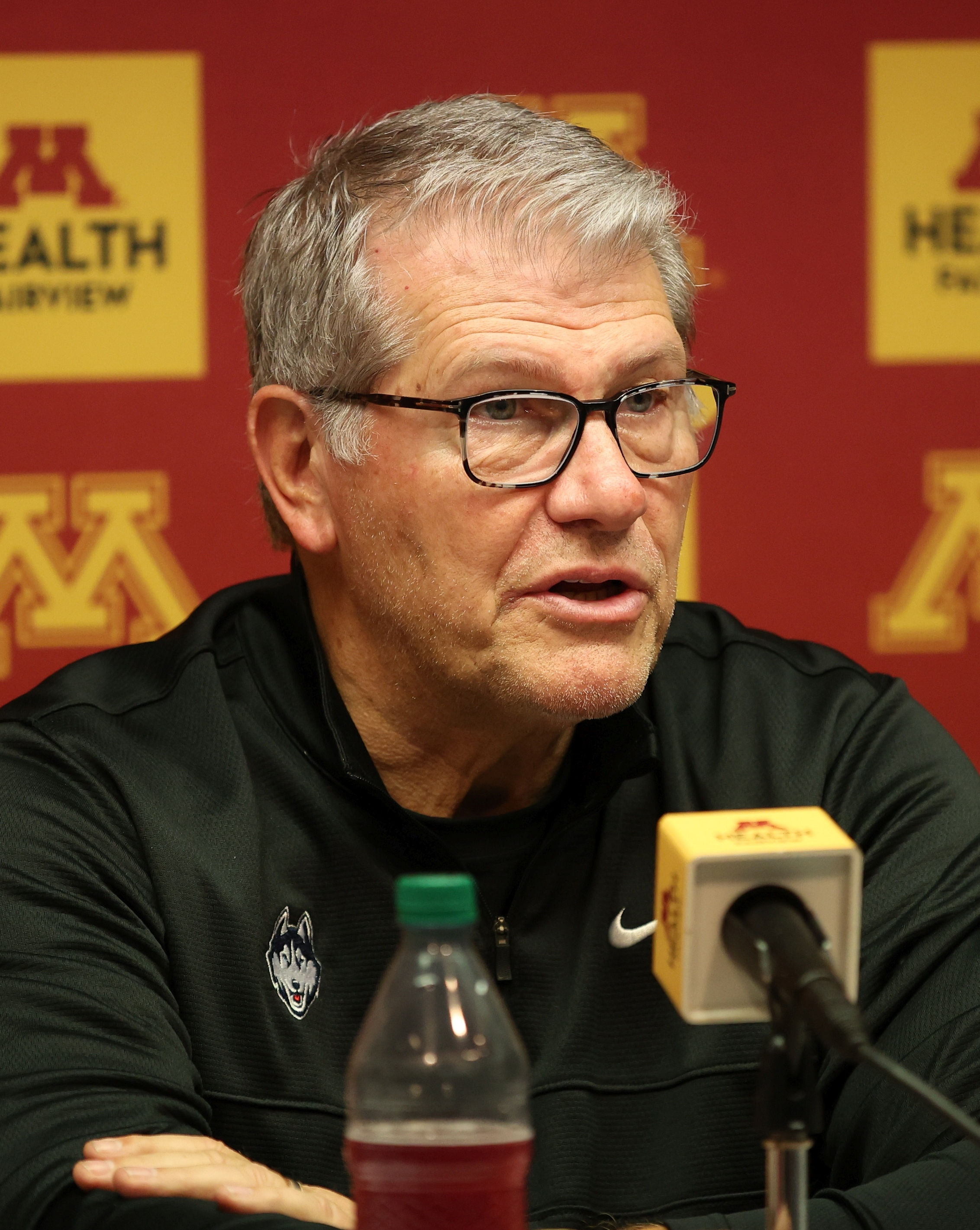
- Auriemma in 2023

Current position
- Title: Head coach
- Team: Connecticut
- Conference: Big East Conference
- Record: 1,292–168 (.885)
- Annual salary: $3.5 million

Biographical details
- Born: March 23, 1954 (age 72); Montella, Italy
- Education: West Chester University

Coaching career (HC unless noted)
- 1977–1978: Bishop McDevitt HS (assistant varsity coach / head JV coach)
- 1978–1979: Saint Joseph's (assistant)
- 1979–1981: Bishop Kenrick HS (assistant)
- 1981–1985: Virginia (assistant)
- 1985–present: UConn

Head coaching record
- Overall: 1,292–168 (.885)
- Tournaments: 146–25 (NCAA Division I)

Accomplishments and honors

Championships
- 12 NCAA Division I tournament (1995, 2000, 2002–2004, 2009, 2010, 2013–2016, 2025); 25 NCAA Division I regional – Final Four (1991, 1995, 1996, 2000–2004, 2008–2022, 2024–2026); 24 Big East tournament (1989, 1991, 1994–2002, 2005, 2006, 2008–2012, 2021–2026); 25 Big East regular season (1989–1991, 1994–2004, 2007–2011, 2021–2026); 7 AAC tournament (2014–2020); 7 AAC regular season (2014–2020)

Awards
- 8× Naismith Coach of the Year (1995, 1997, 2000, 2002, 2008, 2009, 2016, 2017); 7× WBCA National Coach of the Year (1997, 2000, 2002, 2008, 2009, 2016, 2017); 9× AP Coach of the Year (1995, 1997, 2000, 2003, 2008, 2009, 2011, 2016, 2017); 6× USBWA Women's National Coach of the Year (1995, 2003, 2008, 2009, 2016, 2017); 14× Big East Coach of the Year (1989, 1995, 1997, 2000, 2002, 2003, 2008–2011, 2021, 2024–2026); 6× AAC Coach of the Year (2014–2017, 2019–2020); John R. Wooden Legends of Coaching Award (2012); National Italian American Sports Hall of Fame (2007)
- Basketball Hall of Fame; Inducted in 2006 (profile)
- Women's Basketball Hall of Fame
Medal record
Coach for women’s basketball
Representing United States
Olympic Games
| Gold medal – first place | 2000 Sydney | Team |
| Gold medal – first place | 2012 London | Team |
| Gold medal – first place | 2016 Rio de Janeiro | Team |
FIBA World Championship
| Gold medal – first place | 2010 Czech Republic |
| Gold medal – first place | 2014 Turkey |
FIBA Under-19 World Championship
| Bronze medal – third place | 2001 Czech Republic |

Luigi "Geno" Auriemma (born March 23, 1954) is an Italian-born American basketball coach who is the head coach of the UConn Huskies women's basketball team. He holds the NCAA basketball records for wins and winning percentage with a minimum of 10 seasons. Auriemma also has the most NCAA Division I basketball championships at 12.

Serving as UConn's head coach since 1985, Auriemma built the team into one of the top women's college basketball programs. In addition to his record 12 championships, he has led UConn to 19 undefeated conference seasons (including eight consecutive) and six perfect seasons. He has also won eight national Naismith College Coach of the Year awards.

Outside of college basketball, Auriemma was the head coach of the United States women's national team from 2009 through 2016, winning the 2010 and 2014 World Championships, and gold medals at the 2012 and 2016 Summer Olympics. He was inducted to the Naismith Memorial Basketball Hall of Fame and the Women's Basketball Hall of Fame in 2006.

== Early life and education ==
Auriemma emigrated with his family from Montella in Southern Italy to Norristown, Pennsylvania, when he was seven years old, and he spent the rest of his childhood there. Auriemma grew up poor, with his parents working low wage factory jobs. Auriemma had to teach himself English after coming to the United States. When he was growing up, his favorite team was the 1970s New York Knicks, then coached by Red Holzman.

Auriemma attended Montgomery County Community College before graduating from West Chester University in 1977.

== Career ==
Auriemma was hired as an assistant coach at Saint Joseph's University, where he worked in 1978 and 1979. Prior to coaching at Saint Joseph's University he began his career coaching women's basketball at Bishop McDevitt High School in Wyncote, Pennsylvania. He then took a two-year absence from college basketball, serving as an assistant coach at his former high school, Bishop Kenrick, before assuming an assistant coaching position with the University of Virginia Cavaliers women's team in 1981. Auriemma became a naturalized United States citizen in 1994 at the age of 40, noting in his autobiography that he finally decided to naturalize when his University of Connecticut team was slated to tour Italy that summer and he was concerned about potential problems, as he had never done any required national service in his birth country.

For many years, Auriemma and his wife, Kathy, maintained a home in Avalon, New Jersey, to be near their respective parents in the Philadelphia area.

=== University of Connecticut ===
Prior to Auriemma's arrival in 1985, the Huskies women's basketball team had posted only one winning season in its history. The decision to hire Auriemma was part of the university's commitment to better fund women's sports. Auriemma's was the final interview scheduled by the search staff. Most of the other candidates were highly qualified, and most were female. One of those included in the interview process was Chris Dailey, who became Auriemma's assistant and is currently the associate head coach. Dailey was identified as the candidate most likely to receive an offer if Auriemma turned down the position.

Connecticut quickly rose to prominence after Auriemma was hired in August 1985. After finishing 12–15 in Auriemma's first season (his only losing season), the Huskies notched their first-ever 20-win season, first conference title and first NCAA Tournament appearance. Connecticut has finished above .500 for 33 consecutive seasons, including six undefeated seasons (1994–95, 2001–02, 2008–09, 2009–10, 2013–14, and 2015–16) and three NCAA record streaks of 111, 90 and 70 consecutive wins. On December 21, 2010, Auriemma led UConn to its 89th consecutive victory, one more than the all-time NCAA men's wins record of 88 held by UCLA; the streak ended at 90 wins. The Huskies subsequently broke their own record with an 111-game winning streak that began in 2014 and ended in 2017. They have also appeared in every NCAA Tournament since 1989–as of the end of the 2025–26 season, the second-longest active consecutive appearances streak in Division I only to the late Pat Summitt of the University of Tennessee Volunteer Lady Vols.

At the end of the 2023–24 season, Auriemma's record as a head coach was 1217–162, for an 88.2 winning percentage. That winning percentage is the highest among Division I active coaches. His career at UConn also includes 27 seasons with 30 or more wins. UConn has won twelve national championships under Auriemma (1995, 2000, 2002, 2003, 2004, 2009, 2010, 2013, 2014, 2015, 2016, 2025) and made the Final Four 24 times (1991, 1995, 1996, 2000–2004, 2008–2019, 2021, 2022, 2024, 2025). Auriemma has also guided UConn to 21 conference regular season titles and 20 conference tournament titles. They lost 17 conference games in the last two decades of play in the Big East Conference, and have never lost a conference game since the old Big East reorganized as the American Athletic Conference in 2013.

With the win in 2016, Auriemma passed UCLA men's coach John Wooden for most college basketball championships, and the Huskies became the first Division I women's basketball team to win four straight national championships.

The team has been especially successful on its home court in the Harry A. Gampel Pavilion on the UConn campus in Storrs, Connecticut, and in the larger PeoplesBank Arena in Hartford; they tied an NCAA women's basketball record with 69 consecutive home wins between 2000 and 2003. That record was broken in 2011. The last home loss was to Villanova in the game that ended their 70-game winning streak. Moreover, between Auriemma's arrival and the close of the 2005 season, UConn won 295 games versus just 31 losses. The team set Big East Conference records for both single-game and season-long attendance.

Auriemma is also known for cultivating individual players, and the 13 multiple-All-America players whom Auriemma has coached —Rebecca Lobo, Jennifer Rizzotti, Kara Wolters, Nykesha Sales, Svetlana Abrosimova, Sue Bird, Swin Cash, Diana Taurasi, Tina Charles, Maya Moore, Stefanie Dolson, Bria Hartley and Breanna Stewart— have combined to win eight Naismith College Player of the Year awards, seven Wade Trophies, and nine NCAA basketball tournament Most Outstanding Player awards. The UConn athletics website also notes that, through 2006–07, every recruited freshman who has finished her eligibility at UConn has graduated with a degree.

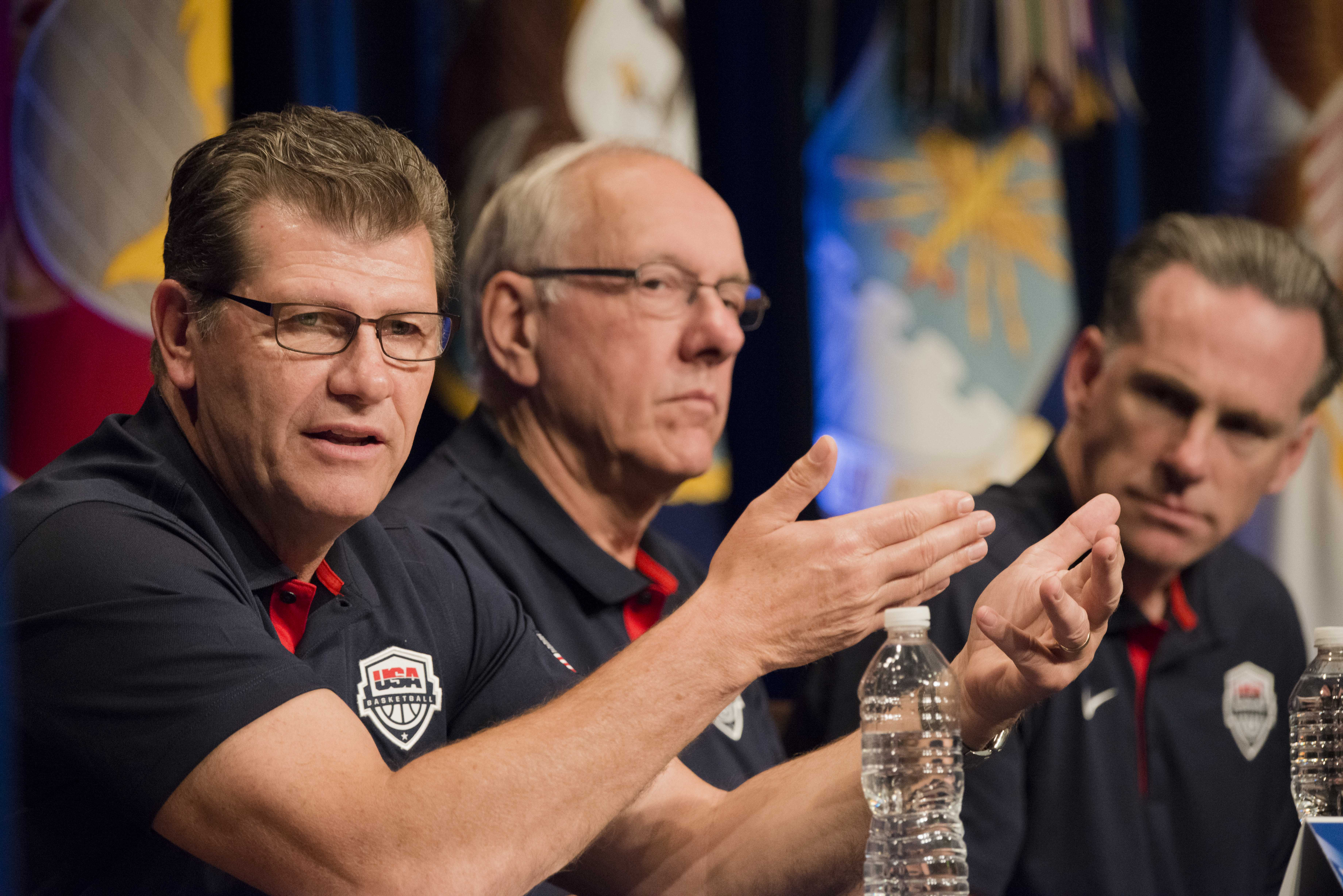
Auriemma with Jim Boeheim and Jamie Dixon in 2014

Since achieving its first #1 ranking in the 1994–95 season, UConn under Auriemma is 186–10 when playing as the nation's #1 team. At the end of the 2009–10 season, he had a record of 127–52 against top 25 opponents and a 57–35 record against top 10 opponents. He won his 600th game on New Year's Eve 2006, accomplishing the feat in 716 games, tying him with Phillip Kahler for the fastest women's basketball coach to reach that milestone. Auriemma won his 700th game on November 27, 2009, in 822 total games, becoming the fastest head coach to that milestone in the history of college basketball at any level, men or women. He became one of eight active women's college basketball coaches to have 700 or more wins. Auriemma became the sixth coach in women's basketball history to reach 800 career victories on March 6, 2012, also reaching 800 career wins faster than any coach in the history of college basketball men or women at any division level in just 928 career games. On February 3, 2015, Auriemma notched his 900th victory in only 1,034 games, reaching this milestone also faster than any college coach in history. Auriemma was a member of the inaugural class (2006) of inductees to the University of Connecticut women's basketball Huskies of Honor recognition program. Auriemma's 2013–2018 salary is $10.9 million. Auriemma reached his 1,200th career win against Seton Hall on February 7, 2024.

==== Staged shot incident ====
Auriemma created controversy in 1998 when he arranged with Villanova coach Harry Perretta to orchestrate a shot at the beginning of their scheduled game. University of Connecticut's top player, Nykesha Sales, was two points short of breaking the team record for most points in a career when she ruptured her right Achilles tendon in the second to last game of the season against Notre Dame. When the following game, against Villanova, began, Villanova players allowed Connecticut to win the tip off and then pass the ball down to Sales who was standing underneath the basket. She laid the ball in to break the record. Connecticut players then stood back and allowed Villanova an uncontested layup of their own before beginning regular play.

==== Rivalries ====
The rivalry between the Huskies and the University of Tennessee Lady Vols extended to Auriemma's relationship with Volunteers counterpart Pat Summitt. The two, through print and broadcast media, were often at odds. At the end of the 2009–10 season, Auriemma had slightly surpassed Summitt among active Division I coaches for career winning percentage, with Auriemma at 85.8 and Summitt at 84.1. In 2007, Summitt, who believed Auriemma had used less-than-honorable tactics in his successful recruitment of Maya Moore, canceled the yearly game between the two programs. After Summitt announced her diagnosis of early onset Alzheimer's disease in 2011, the two mended their relationship, with Auriemma donating ten thousand dollars to Summitt's Alzheimer's foundation. Summitt retired in 2012 and died in 2016.

Former UConn men's basketball coach Jim Calhoun has been called Auriemma's "unfriendly rival", and he once mocked the women's team's fan base as the "world's largest nursing home." When asked about their relationship in 2001, Auriemma said, "Jim has a problem with anyone else's success, not just ours. Do we get along? No, but we don't have to."

=== United States women's national basketball team ===
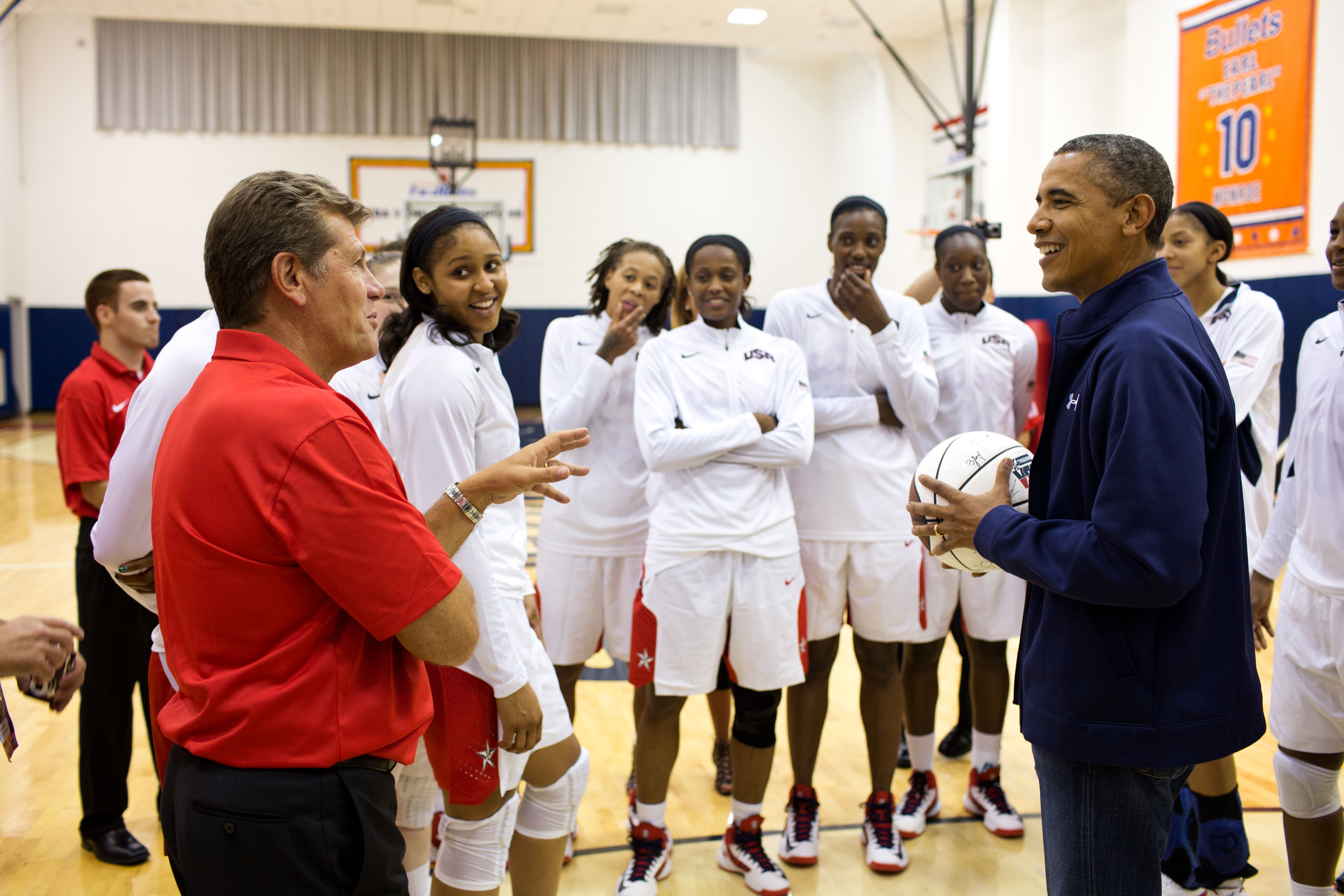
Auriemma and the 2012 U.S. Women's Olympic basketball team meet president Barack Obama

Auriemma was named head coach of the US women's team that competed in the Junior World Championship in Brno, Czech Republic in July 2001. The team won its first five games, including a record-setting win against Mali. The 97–27 final score represented the largest margin of victory by a USA team in Junior World Championship history. The preliminary round results qualified the team for the medal rounds, where they faced the host team, the Czech Republic. With a home crowd cheering them on, the Czech team won 92–88 and went on to beat Russia 82–80 to win the gold medal. The US team beat Australia 77–72 to win the bronze medal. Diana Taurasi was the leading scorer for the US with 19.3 points per game, while Alana Beard was close behind with 18.0 points per game. Nicole Powell was the leading rebounder for the US, with 7.0 rebounds per game.

Auriemma was named head coach of the US women's national team in preparation for competition in the 2010 World Championships and 2012 Olympics. Because many team members were still playing in the WNBA until just prior to the World Championship, the team had only one day of practice with the entire team before leaving for Ostrava and Karlovy Vary, Czech Republic. Despite this, the team won its first game against Greece by 26 points. The team continued to dominate with victory margins exceeding 20 points in the first five games. Several players shared scoring honors, with Swin Cash, Angel McCoughtry, Maya Moore, Diana Taurasi, Lindsay Whalen, and Sylvia Fowles all ending as high scorer in the first few games. The sixth game was against undefeated Australia — the USA jumped out to a 24-point lead and won 83–75. Team USA won its next two games by over 30 points, then faced the host team, the Czech Republic, in the championship game. They had a five-point lead at halftime, which was cut to three points, but the Czechs never got closer. Team USA won the championship and gold medal. At the 2012 Olympics, Auriemma's team went 8–0 and won the gold medal game over France 86–50. Their closest match of the Olympics – and the only game in which their margin of victory was less than 25 points – was an 86–73 win in the semi-finals over eventual Bronze Medal winner Australia.

Auriemma was again named head coach of the US women's basketball team for the 2014 FIBA World Championship for Women and the 2016 Summer Olympics. In the 2014 World Championship, his team went 6–0 and won the gold medal, outscoring their opponents 553–380 over the six games – an average margin of victory of almost 30 points per game.

== Head coaching record ==
Record table
| Season | Team | Overall | Conference | Standing | Postseason |
|---|---|---|---|---|---|
Connecticut Huskies (Big East Conference) (1985–2013)
| 1985–86 | Connecticut | 12–15 | 4–12 | 7th | |
| 1986–87 | Connecticut | 14–13 | 9–7 | 7th | |
| 1987–88 | Connecticut | 17–11 | 9–7 | 5th | |
| 1988–89 | Connecticut | 24–6 | 13–2 | 1st | NCAA First Round |
| 1989–90 | Connecticut | 25–6 | 14–2 | T–1st | NCAA Second Round |
| 1990–91 | Connecticut | 29–5 | 14–2 | 1st | NCAA Final Four |
| 1991–92 | Connecticut | 23–11 | 13–5 | T–2nd | NCAA Second Round |
| 1992–93 | Connecticut | 18–11 | 12–6 | 3rd | NCAA First Round |
| 1993–94 | Connecticut | 30–3 | 17–1 | 1st | NCAA Elite Eight |
| 1994–95 | Connecticut | 35–0 | 18–0 | 1st | NCAA Champions |
| 1995–96 | Connecticut | 34–4 | 17–1 | 1st | NCAA Final Four |
| 1996–97 | Connecticut | 33–1 | 18–0 | 1st | NCAA Elite Eight |
| 1997–98 | Connecticut | 34–3 | 17–1 | 1st | NCAA Elite Eight |
| 1998–99 | Connecticut | 29–5 | 17–1 | T–1st | NCAA Sweet Sixteen |
| 1999–00 | Connecticut | 36–1 | 16–0 | 1st | NCAA Champions |
| 2000–01 | Connecticut | 32–3 | 15–1 | T–1st | NCAA Final Four |
| 2001–02 | Connecticut | 39–0 | 16–0 | 1st | NCAA Champions |
| 2002–03 | Connecticut | 37–1 | 16–0 | 1st | NCAA Champions |
| 2003–04 | Connecticut | 31–4 | 14–2 | 1st | NCAA Champions |
| 2004–05 | Connecticut | 25–8 | 13–3 | T–2nd | NCAA Sweet Sixteen |
| 2005–06 | Connecticut | 32–5 | 14–2 | 2nd | NCAA Elite Eight |
| 2006–07 | Connecticut | 32–4 | 16–0 | 1st | NCAA Elite Eight |
| 2007–08 | Connecticut | 36–2 | 15–1 | 1st | NCAA Final Four |
| 2008–09 | Connecticut | 39–0 | 16–0 | 1st | NCAA Champions |
| 2009–10 | Connecticut | 39–0 | 16–0 | 1st | NCAA Champions |
| 2010–11 | Connecticut | 36–2 | 16–0 | 1st | NCAA Final Four |
| 2011–12 | Connecticut | 33–5 | 13–3 | 3rd | NCAA Final Four |
| 2012–13 | Connecticut | 35–4 | 14–2 | 2nd | NCAA Champions |
Connecticut Huskies (American Athletic Conference) (2013–2020)
| 2013–14 | Connecticut | 40–0 | 18–0 | 1st | NCAA Champions |
| 2014–15 | Connecticut | 38–1 | 18–0 | 1st | NCAA Champions |
| 2015–16 | Connecticut | 38–0 | 18–0 | 1st | NCAA Champions |
| 2016–17 | Connecticut | 36–1 | 16–0 | 1st | NCAA Final Four |
| 2017–18 | Connecticut | 36–1 | 16–0 | 1st | NCAA Final Four |
| 2018–19 | Connecticut | 35–3 | 16–0 | 1st | NCAA Final Four |
| 2019–20 | Connecticut | 29–3 | 16–0 | 1st | Postseason not held |
Connecticut Huskies (Big East Conference) (2020–present)
| 2020–21 | Connecticut | 28–2 | 18–0 | 1st | NCAA Final Four |
| 2021–22 | Connecticut | 30–6 | 16–1 | 1st | NCAA Runner-up |
| 2022–23 | Connecticut | 31–6 | 18–2 | 1st | NCAA Sweet Sixteen |
| 2023–24 | Connecticut | 33–6 | 18–0 | 1st | NCAA Final Four |
| 2024–25 | Connecticut | 37–3 | 18–0 | 1st | NCAA Champions |
| 2025–26 | Connecticut | 38–1 | 20–0 | 1st | NCAA Final Four |
| 2026–27 | Connecticut | 4–2 | 1–0 | | |
| Connecticut: | | 1,292–168 (.885) | 629–64 (.908) | | |
| Total: | | 1,292–168 (.885) | | | |
National champion Postseason invitational champion Conference regular season champion Conference regular season and conference tournament champion Division regular season champion Division regular season and conference tournament champion Conference tournament champion

1. Cancelled due to the coronavirus pandemic

== Other activities ==
During the college basketball offseason, Auriemma serves as an analyst for games of the Women's National Basketball Association broadcast on the American cable television networks ESPN and ESPN2, in which he often critiques his former players.

Auriemma is close friends with former Saint Joseph's University basketball head coach Phil Martelli and his son, Mike Auriemma, attended and played basketball at Saint Joseph's.

Auriemma served as an assistant coach to the gold medalist 2000 U.S. Olympic Team. On April 15, 2009, he was selected to lead USA Basketball Women's National Team in the 2010 FIBA World Championship in the Czech Republic and the London 2012 Summer Olympics.

Auriemma is a member of the Board of Directors of the Kay Yow/WBCA Cancer Fund.

Auriemma is a member of the board of directors at Connecticut Children's Foundation, Inc. and hosts a charity series of events, Geno for the Kids, every year benefiting Connecticut Children's Medical Center.

Auriemma has parlayed his heritage and his love of Italian cuisine into lines of wines and sauces along with several restaurants in Connecticut.

== Awards and honors ==
1989

- Big East Conference Coach of the Year

1995

- USBWA National Coach of the Year
- Naismith College Coach of the Year
- Associated Press College Basketball Coach of the Year
- Big East Conference Coach of the Year (2)

1997

- WBCA National Coach of the Year
- Naismith College Coach of the Year (2)
- Associated Press College Basketball Coach of the Year (2)
- Big East Conference Coach of the Year (3)

2000

- WBCA National Coach of the Year (2)
- Naismith College Coach of the Year (3)
- Associated Press College Basketball Coach of the Year (3)
- Big East Conference Coach of the Year (4)

2002

- WBCA National Coach of the Year (3)
- Naismith College Coach of the Year (4)
- Big East Conference Coach of the Year (5)

2003

- USBWA National Coach of the Year (2)
- Associated Press College Basketball Coach of the Year (4)
- Big East Conference Coach of the Year (6)

2006

- Induction into the Basketball Hall of Fame in Springfield, Massachusetts
- Induction into the Women's Basketball Hall of Fame in Knoxville, Tennessee

2007

- Induction into the National Italian American Sports Hall of Fame

2008

- USBWA National Coach of the Year (3)
- WBCA National Coach of the Year (4)
- Naismith College Coach of the Year (5)
- Associated Press College Basketball Coach of the Year (5)
- Big East Conference Coach of the Year (7)

2009

- USBWA National Coach of the Year (4)
- WBCA National Coach of the Year (5)
- Naismith College Coach of the Year (6)
- Associated Press College Basketball Coach of the Year (6)
- Big East Conference Coach of the Year (8)

2010

- Big East Conference Coach of the Year (9)

2011

- Associated Press College Basketball Coach of the Year (7)
- Big East Conference Coach of the Year (10)

2012

- John R. Wooden Legends of Coaching Award

2014

- American Athletic Conference Coach of the Year
- Named one of ESPNW's Impact 25

2015

- American Athletic Conference Coach of the Year (2)

2016

- USBWA National Coach of the Year (5)
- WBCA National Coach of the Year (6)
- Naismith College Coach of the Year (7)
- Associated Press College Basketball Coach of the Year (8)
- American Athletic Conference Coach of the Year (3)

2017

- Premio ASI Italiani nel mondo
- USBWA National Coach of the Year (6)
- WBCA National Coach of the Year (7)
- Naismith College Coach of the Year (8)
- Associated Press College Basketball Coach of the Year (9)
- American Athletic Conference Coach of the Year (4)

2019

- American Athletic Conference Coach of the Year (5)

2020

- American Athletic Conference Coach of the Year (6)
- Great Immigrants Award honored by the Carnegie Corporation of New York

2021

- Big East Conference Coach of the Year (11)

2024

- Big East Conference Coach of the Year (12)

== Records and achievements ==
- Most wins among NCAA basketball coaches, any level, men's or women's (1,250)
- Highest winning percentage among NCAA basketball coaches (minimum 10 seasons), any level, men's or women's (.884)
- Most NCAA Division I Championships, men's or women's (12)
- Most NCAA Division I Final Fours, men's or women's (24)
- Most NCAA Division I Elite Eights, men's or women's (29)
- Most NCAA Division I Sweet Sixteen, men's or women's (32)
- Most NCAA Division I Tournament wins, men's or women's (143)
- Fastest coach to 800, 900, 1,000, 1,100 and 1,200 wins, any level, men's or women's
- With men's coaches Jim Calhoun (2004) and Kevin Ollie (2014), the only coaches at the same Division I school to win the men's and women's NCAA Tournaments in the same season

== See also ==
- List of college women's basketball career coaching wins leaders

== Other references ==
- Auriemma, G.; MacMullan, J. (2006). Geno: In pursuit of Perfection. Warner Books. ISBN 0-446-57764-2.
- Grundy, Pamela (2005). Shattering the glass. New Press. ISBN 978-1-56584-822-1.
- Karmel, Terese (2005). Hoop Tales:UConn Huskies Women's Basketball (First ed.). Globe Pequot Press. ISBN 0-7627-3501-5.
