= Leigh Curl =

American orthopedic surgeon

Leigh Curl (born 1963) is an orthopedic surgeon who was the first female team physician in the National Football League (NFL).

== Early life and education ==
Born in 1963 Leigh Ann Curl was the second of six children. As a child she excelled in sports and was known as the tomboy of her Pittsburgh neighborhood in Pennsylvania. Women in sports was atypical for a young girl at that time but her parents were highly supportive of her athletic interests. Her mother, who grew up playing basketball, was an especially big source of inspiration and would sometimes surprise her by taking her to watch the Pittsburgh Pirates. Devastatingly for Curl, her mother died from a cerebral aneurysm during her freshman year of high school when Curl was only 14 years old. This was an especially difficult time for Curl who attributes her interests in sports and more specifically her teammates and coaches to getting her through that difficult time in her life.

=== Athletics at University of Connecticut ===
Curl excelled both academically and athletically and was accepted to the University of Connecticut on a basketball scholarship. She had an affinity for the sciences and studied biology, chemistry and physiology before graduating summa cum laude in 1985 as class valedictorian. She was also a four-year starter for the University of Connecticut Women’s basketball team and served as team captain for two years. In her senior year she was named to the all conference second team. In addition she is also recognized as one of the all-time leaders in points and rebounds at the University of Connecticut.

== Career ==
Although it was not firmly a part of her plan, Curl applied to Johns Hopkins University School of Medicine after strong encouragement from her academic professors. She was accepted and completed her doctorate of medicine in 1989 and went on to complete her internship and residency at Johns Hopkins University as well. From there her decision to go into Orthopedic Medicine was predestined. Even today women are few and far between in the field of orthopedics and in fact out of 120 medical students in her class she was the only woman to go into orthopedics. Her decision often came into question by skeptics who undermined her capabilities as a woman. She was often asked if she was physically able of doing the work or if she was concerned about being able to get married and have a family. However she never gave anyone room to question her and championed on confidently to complete a fellowship in sports medicine and shoulder surgery in 1995 from Cornell University.

During the yearlong fellowship she worked as a team physician for the New York Mets, St. John’s University and NYC public schools and recreation program. Following her fellowship she became an assistant professor of orthopedic surgery and sports medicine at the University of Maryland Medical System. During this time (1997-2002) she also served as the head team physician for the University of Maryland Terrapins and was a volunteer physician for Johns Hopkins University and also for both the USA Women’s Rugby and basketball teams.

It was also during her time at the University of Maryland that Dr. Curl became acquainted with the Baltimore Ravens. She was recruited to be the head team Physician for the University of Maryland by a colleague and orthopedic surgeon she met in New York during her fellowship. She also happened to be the head team physician for the Ravens and later after she had left her position she was offered a job with the team. It was also during her first year as team physician that the Ravens went to the Super Bowl. As a team physician, Dr. Curl is responsible for players who get injured during games or practices. She makes quick assessments of injured players out on the field to decide on a course of action. In addition she also performs any surgeries that a player might need. Although this is the highlight of her career she spends the majority of her time seeing patients and teaching medical students and residents. In addition she has also taken a special interest in anterior cruciate ligament (ACL) injuries of the knee and conducts research that investigates the reason that these injuries are four to six times more common in female versus male athletes.

== Honors and awards ==
Dr. Curl was inducted into the GTE Academic Hall of Fame in 1998 and is also a fellow of the American Academy of Orthopedic Surgery. In addition she was also recognized for her undergraduate accomplishments at the University of Connecticut as a two time recipient of the Big East Conference Scholar-Athlete of the year.

In 2025, she was named the 2024 winner of the Jerry "Hawk" Rhea Award, which is given to the NFL physician of the year.
