= III Gymnasium Zagreb =

Public high school in Zagreb, Croatia

III Gymnasium
- III. gimnazija

Location
- Ulica Dragojla Kušlana 52; HR-10000 Zagreb; Croatia
- 45.8125°N 16.0075°E

Information
- Former names: III Male Gymnasium (1922); PTT Education Center (1978); III Gymnasium (1991)
- School type: Public, Gymnasium
- Established: 1922; 104 years ago
- Secondary years taught: 9–12
  - Grade 9: 156 (2024–25)
- Language: Croatian
- Website: Official website (in Croatian)
- Last updated: June 17, 2025

Third Gymnasium (Croatian: III. gimnazija, Treća gimnazija) is a high school in Zagreb, Croatia.

After the school year 2023/24, 138 graduates of this gymnasium enrolled at an institution of higher learning in Croatia, or 92% of students who took up the nationwide Matura exams. The most common destinations for these students were the University of Zagreb faculties of electrical engineering and computing, economics, civil engineering, law, and science.
