= Jamelle Elliott =

American basketball player & coach (born 1974)

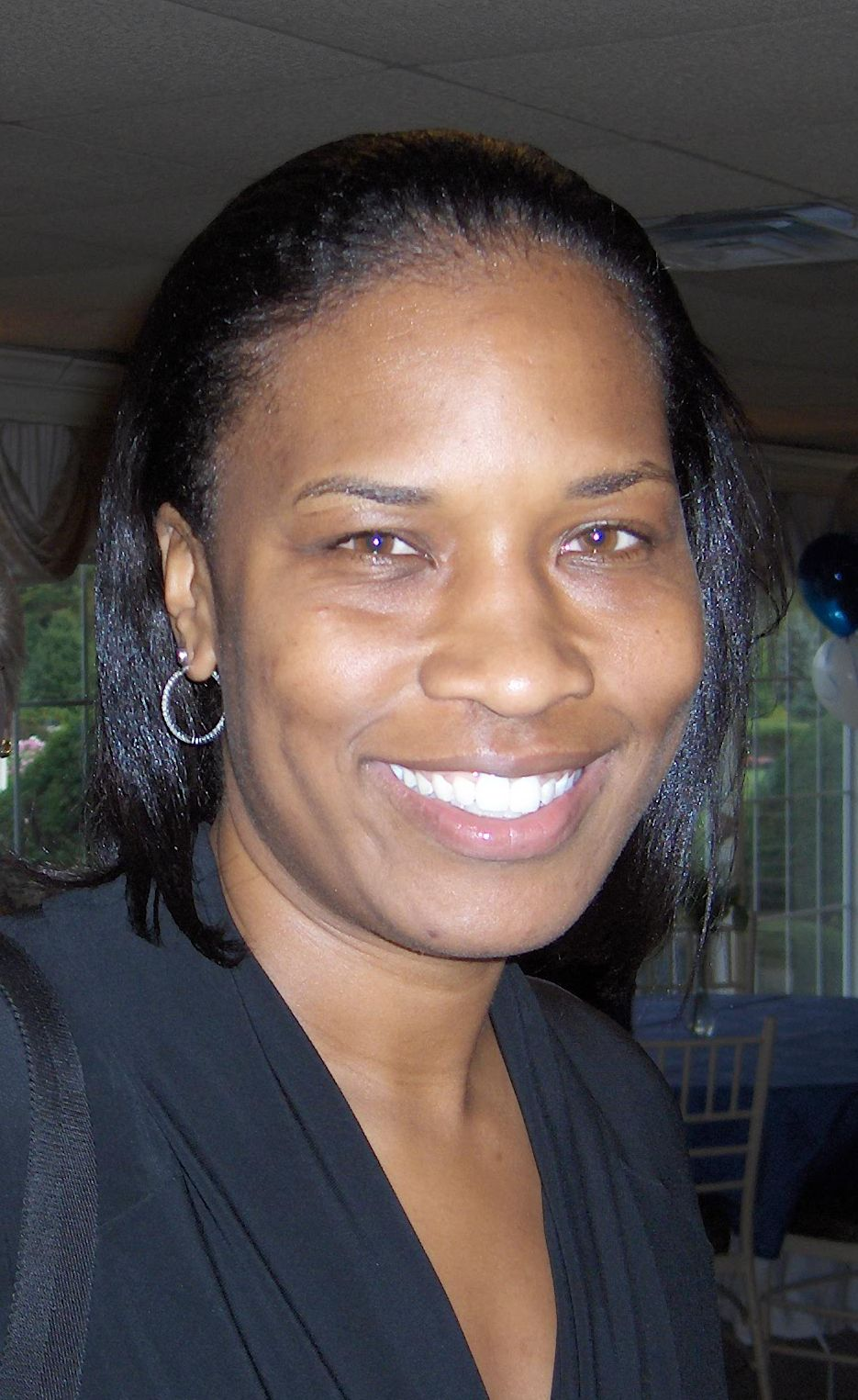
- Elliot in 2009

Biographical details
- Born: May 18, 1974 (age 52); Washington, D.C., U.S.

Playing career
- 1992–1996: UConn
- Position: Forward

Coaching career (HC unless noted)
- 1998–2009: UConn (assistant)
- 2009–2018: Cincinnati
- 2020–2026: UConn (assistant)

Administrative career (AD unless noted)
- 2018–2020: UConn (assoc. AD)

Head coaching record
- Overall: 113–162 (.411)

Accomplishments and honors

Championships
- As player: NCAA championship (1995); Big East All-Freshman Team (1993); As assistant coach: 6× NCAA championship (2000, 2002–2004, 2009, 2025)

Jamelle Renee Elliott (born May 18, 1974) is an American women's basketball coach, notable for her playing and coaching tenures with the University of Connecticut and the University of Cincinnati women's basketball teams.

== Early life ==
Elliott was introduced to basketball by her cousin Adrien Elliott, who Elliott looked up to as a youngster. Adrien went to H.D. Woodson High School in Washington DC. Elliott attended summer camp one year with Adrien, and became interested in the game. She joined her junior high school basketball team, and also joined an Amateur Athletic Union team. Elliott wanted to follow her cousin to Woodson and get the best basketball experience so she enrolled at Woodson and traveled almost an hour-and-a-half drive each way to school.

"I used basketball as my way to hopefully go to college, and it worked out.”

While at Woodson, Elliott's basketball team won two consecutive state championships. She also had individual success, earning Scholar-Athlete honors, as well as being named to the Washington Post All-Metro Team.

== College career ==
Elliott played basketball in the summer leagues at Georgetown University. One day Geno Auriemma walked in and liked what he saw. He recruited Jamelle to play for him at Connecticut. Elliott also had other colleges recruiting her, such as Georgetown University, Syracuse University, Temple University, and George Washington University, but she eventually chose UConn.

She played in 135 games in her UConn career, having an overall record of 117–18 (.867) and never missing a game in her four years. In her junior season the Huskies went undefeated (35–0) and won the 1995 NCAA National Championship over the Tennessee Lady Vols, starting the decade rivalry between the two teams. She finished her UConn career with 1,387 points, and is ranked No. 7 among UConn's all-time rebounding leaders (1,054). Auriemma would say about her, "I've coached a lot of bright players, but Jamelle is the smartest and the toughest".

== After college ==
After graduating from UConn with a bachelor's degree in Business Administration, Elliott took the following year off from sports, and pursued her master's degree in Sports Management with an interest in some day becoming an athletic director of a college. She worked in UConn's business office as a graduate assistant. After taking a year off she began to miss basketball. The next year she accepted an assistant coaching job at Connecticut. She held the assistant coaching position for 12 seasons. The 2002 team was the second UConn team to have a perfect record. Elliott put the pressure on the 2002 team to match her 1995 team, urging them to try to be undefeated. Tamika Williams (a player on the 2002 team) said, "Jamelle used to tell us that we never really won a national championship until we went undefeated. She always used to rub that in our faces. But that night we ran to her and rubbed it in her face."

Elliott was also an assistant coach on the 2009 team that went undefeated 39–0.

== Cincinnati Bearcats ==
On May 5, 2009, Elliott achieved her goal of becoming a head coach by taking the Cincinnati Bearcats women's basketball job. She was UC women's head coach for nine seasons.

"I'd like the opportunity to turn a program around or make it better like Coach Auriemma has done with his basketball program at UConn."

Elliott was previously a candidate for jobs at Fairfield, George Washington, and Penn State.

On May 18, 2009, Marisa Moseley, an assistant coach at the University of Minnesota and former Boston University player, was hired to replace Elliott as assistant coach for the Huskies.

In March 2018, Elliott was fired after nine seasons. She was 113–162 during that time, but was coming off a 19–13 season in which the Bearcats played in the WNIT.

== University of Connecticut statistics ==
Jamelle Elliott Statistics at University of Connecticut
Name	G	FG	FGA	PCT	3FG	3FGA	PCT	FT	FTA	PCT	REB	AVG	A	TO	B	S	MIN	PTS	AVG
1992–93	29	110	227	0.485	8	26	0.308	65	85	0.765	227	7.8	33	85	2	21	779	293	10.1
1993–94	33	145	288	0.503	7	34	0.206	93	130	0.715	244	7.4	66	88	5	27	980	390	11.8
1994–95	35	131	253	0.518	14	24	0.583	106	129	0.822	282	8.1	98	82	3	30	911	382	10.9
1995–96	38	116	238	0.487	21	59	0.356	69	86	0.802	301	7.9	79	71	12	34	1045	322	8.5
Totals	135	502	1006	0.499	50	143	0.35	333	430	0.774	1054	7.8	276	326	22	112	3715	1387	10.3

== Huskies of Honor induction ==
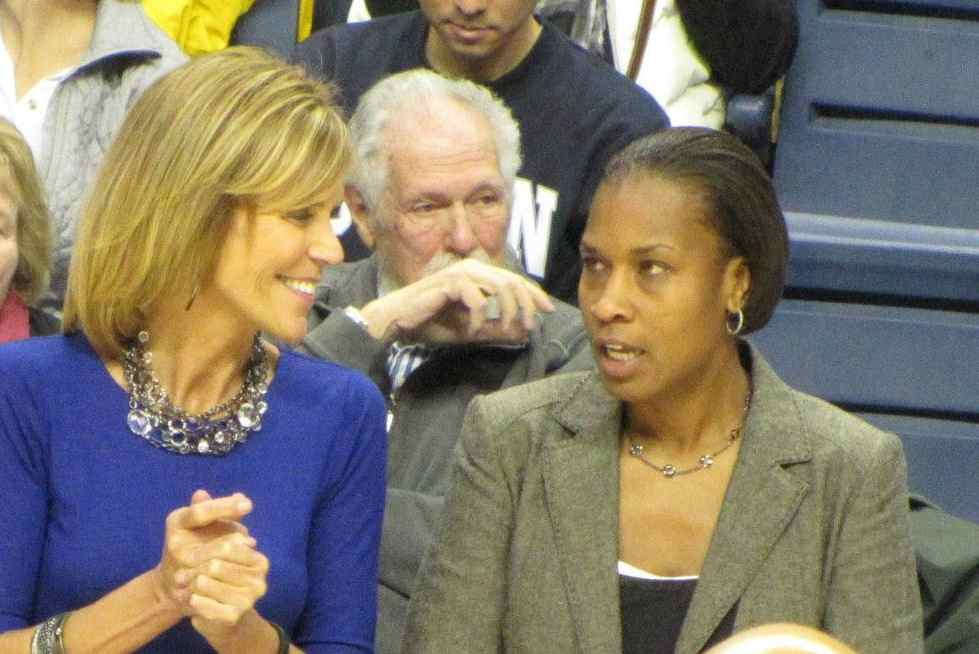
Elliot at Huskies of Honor induction

On December 29, 2013, the University of Connecticut inducted two women's basketball teams, the National Championship winning teams of 2002–03 and 2003–04, into the Huskies of Honor. Elliot was an assistant coach for each of those two seasons.

== Head coaching record ==
Record table
Season	Team	Overall	Conference	Standing	Postseason
Cincinnati Bearcats (Big East) (2009–2013)
2009–10	Cincinnati	12–18	4–12	14th	
2010–11	Cincinnati	9–20	2–14	15th	
2011–12	Cincinnati	16–16	6–10	T-10th	WNIT Second Round
2012–13	Cincinnati	12–18	4–12	13th	
Cincinnati Bearcats (American Athletic Conference) (2013–2018)
2013–14	Cincinnati	13–18	5–13	8th	
2014–15	Cincinnati	8–23	4–14	9th	
2015–16	Cincinnati	8–22	4–14	9th	
2016–17	Cincinnati	16–14	7–9	5th	
2017–18	Cincinnati	19–13	10–6	4th	WNIT First Round
Cincinnati:		113–162 (.411)	46–104 (.307)		
Total:		113–162 (.411)			
National champion Postseason invitational champion Conference regular season champion Conference regular season and conference tournament champion Division regular season champion Division regular season and conference tournament champion Conference tournament champion

== See also ==
- List of Connecticut Huskies women's basketball players with 1000 points
- List of Connecticut Huskies women's basketball players with 1000 rebounds
