= Chris Dailey =

American basketball coach (born 1959)

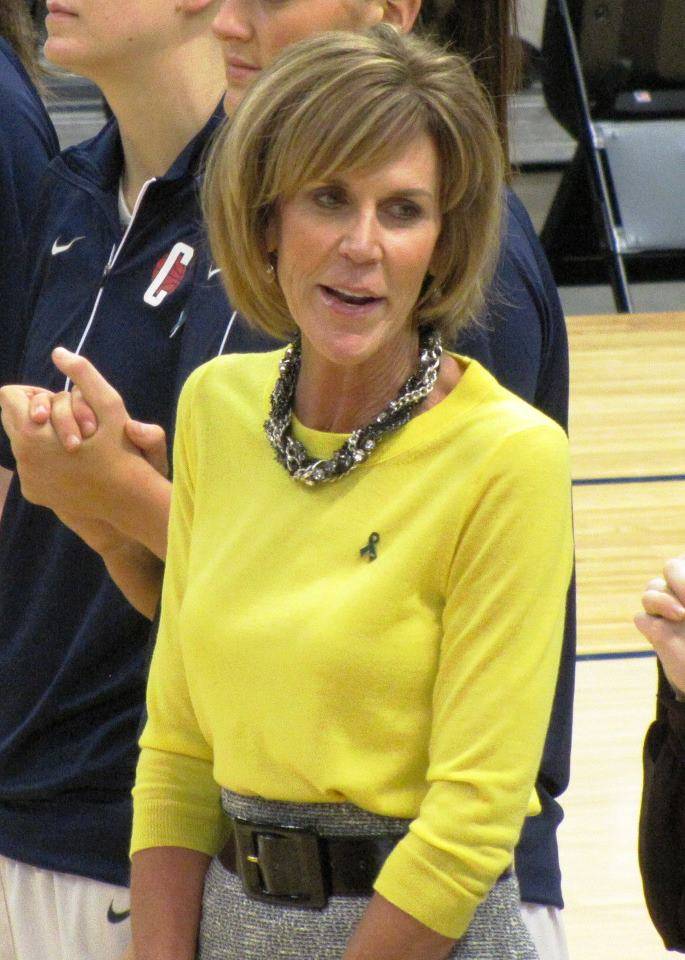
- Dailey in 2013

Current position
- Title: Associate head coach
- Team: Connecticut
- Conference: Big East Conference

Biographical details
- Born: August 9, 1959 (age 66); New Brunswick, New Jersey, U.S.

Playing career
- 1978–1982: Rutgers

Coaching career (HC unless noted)
- 1982–1983: Cornell (assistant)
- 1983–1985: Rutgers (assistant)
- 1985–1988: UConn (assistant)
- 1988–present: UConn (associate head coach)

Accomplishments and honors

Championships
- As player: AIAW tournament champion (1982); As assistant coach: 12× NCAA tournament national champion (1995, 2000, 2002–2004, 2009, 2010, 2013–2016, 2025); 24× Big East regular season champion (1989–1991, 1994–2004, 2007–2011, 2021–2025); 7× AAC regular season champion (2014–2020); 23× Big East tournament champion (1989, 1991, 1994–2002, 2005, 2006, 2008–2012, 2021–2025); 7× AAC tournament champion (2014–2020)
- Women's Basketball Hall of Fame

Christine A. Dailey (born September 7, 1959) is an American women's basketball coach, who has been the associate head coach for the Connecticut Huskies women's basketball team since 1988. Dailey was inducted into the Women's Basketball Hall of Fame in 2018.

== Early life and education ==
Raised in New Brunswick, New Jersey, Dailey played prep basketball at St. Peter the Apostle High School.

Dailey graduated from Douglass College of Rutgers University in 1982. She played basketball for Rutgers from 1978 to 1982 and was a captain in her final two seasons. She graduated with a Bachelor of Science in health and physical education.

== Coaching career ==
=== UConn (Assistant Coach, Associate Head Coach) ===
Dailey was hired as an assistant for UConn in 1985 and was promoted to associate head coach in 1988. She has helped lead UConn to twelve national titles, 25 conference regular season titles, and 24 conference tournament championships. In 2018, Dailey and Mickie DeMoss were inducted into the Women's Basketball Hall of Fame as the only assistant coaches to be inducted.

If the head coach of the team is unable to be present for a game, the most senior assistant takes over head coaching duties. In the case of UConn that is Dailey, who was initially assistant coach, but then became associate head coach. Although NCAA rules credit the game result (win or loss) to the head coach of record and not to the acting head coach, both the media and fans tend to keep track of the results when an assistant steps in for the head coach. Dailey is currently 17–0 when filling in for Auriemma. 9 wins occurred during regular season play, 6 were in two different conference tournaments, and 2 were the first rounds of the 2021 NCAA Division I women's basketball tournament.
