= Jean Balthaser =

American basketball coach

Biographical details
- Education: West Chester State College

Coaching career (HC unless noted)

Women's basketball
- 1968–1975: Holy Name HS (PA)
- 1975–1977: Pittsburgh (assistant)
- 1977–1980: Pittsburgh
- 1980–1985: UConn

Administrative career (AD unless noted)
- 1971–1975: Holy Name HS (PA) (asst. AD)

Head coaching record
- Overall: 99–128 (.436)

Jean Balthaser is an American former basketball coach who was the head coach of the Pittsburgh Panthers women's basketball team from 1977 to 1980 and the UConn Huskies women's basketball team from 1980 to 1985.

== Early life ==
Balthaser graduated from Reading Central Catholic High School in 1964 and West Chester State College in 1968.

== Coaching ==
In 1968, Balthaser was hired to coach the girl's basketball, field hockey, and track and field teams at Holy Name High School in Reading, Pennsylvania. Her basketball teams won the Suburban Catholic League title in 1972 and the Diocese of Allentown championship in 1973. She was also the school's assistant athletic director from 1971 to 1975.

In 1975, Balthaser became an assistant to Pittsburgh women's basketball coach Pat Wallace. Wallace was let go in 1977 and Balthaser was chosen to succeed her. Pitt had a 47–40 record and made the EAIAW women's basketball tournament every year in Balthaser's three seasons as head coach.

In 1980, Balthaser left Pitt to become the women's basketball coach at UConn. The Huskies finished 16–14 in Balthaser's first year as head coach. It was the first season with a winning record in the program's history. UConn failed to match that success and Balthaser resigned after a 9–18 1984–85 season, citing a desire to change careers. Her overall record at UConn is 52–88.
