= UConn Huskies women's basketball =

Women's college basketball team

2026–27 UConn Huskies women's basketball team
- University: University of Connecticut
- First season: 1974–75; 52 years ago
- Athletic director: David Benedict
- Head coach: Geno Auriemma (42nd season)
- Location: Storrs, Connecticut
- Arena: Harry A. Gampel Pavilion (capacity: 10,299); PeoplesBank Arena (capacity: 15,684)
- Conference: Big East
- Nickname: Huskies
- Colors: National flag blue and white
- All-time record: 1342–327 (.804)

NCAA Division I tournament champions
- 1995, 2000, 2002, 2003, 2004, 2009, 2010, 2013, 2014, 2015, 2016, 2025
Other NCAA Division I tournament results
Runner-up	2022
Final Four	1991, 1995, 1996, 2000, 2001, 2002, 2003, 2004, 2008, 2009, 2010, 2011, 2012, 2013, 2014, 2015, 2016, 2017, 2018, 2019, 2021, 2022, 2024, 2025, 2026
Elite Eight	1991, 1994, 1995, 1996, 1997, 1998, 2000, 2001, 2002, 2003, 2004, 2006, 2007, 2008, 2009, 2010, 2011, 2012, 2013, 2014, 2015, 2016, 2017, 2018, 2019, 2021, 2022, 2024, 2025, 2026
Sweet Sixteen	1991, 1994, 1995, 1996, 1997, 1998, 1999, 2000, 2001, 2002, 2003, 2004, 2005, 2006, 2007, 2008, 2009, 2010, 2011, 2012, 2013, 2014, 2015, 2016, 2017, 2018, 2019, 2021, 2022, 2023, 2024, 2025, 2026
Appearances	1989, 1990, 1991, 1992, 1993, 1994, 1995, 1996, 1997, 1998, 1999, 2000, 2001, 2002, 2003, 2004, 2005, 2006, 2007, 2008, 2009, 2010, 2011, 2012, 2013, 2014, 2015, 2016, 2017, 2018, 2019, 2021, 2022, 2023, 2024, 2025, 2026

Conference tournament champions
- 1989, 1991, 1994, 1995, 1996, 1997, 1998, 1999, 2000, 2001, 2002, 2005, 2006, 2008, 2009, 2010, 2011, 2012, 2014, 2015, 2016, 2017, 2018, 2019, 2020, 2021, 2022, 2023, 2024, 2025, 2026

Conference regular-season champions
- 1989, 1990, 1991, 1994, 1995, 1996, 1997, 1998, 1999, 2000, 2001, 2002, 2003, 2004, 2007, 2008, 2009, 2010, 2011, 2014, 2015, 2016, 2017, 2018, 2019, 2020, 2021, 2022, 2023, 2024, 2025, 2026

Uniforms
Home	Away	Alternate

The UConn Huskies women's basketball team is the college basketball program representing the University of Connecticut in Storrs, Connecticut, in the NCAA Division I women's basketball competition. They currently play in the Big East Conference.

The UConn Huskies have won a record 12 NCAA Division I National Championships and a women's record four in a row, from 2013 through 2016, plus over 50 conference regular season and tournament championships. They have taken part in every NCAA tournament since 1989; as of the end of the 2024–25 season, this is the second-longest active streak in Division I. From 2008 to 2022, they appeared in a record 14 consecutive Final Fours.

UConn owns the two longest winning streaks (men's or women's) in college basketball history. The longest streak, 111 straight wins, started with a win against Creighton University on November 23, 2014, and ended on March 31, 2017, when a buzzer-beater at the end of overtime caused a 66–64 loss in the 2017 NCAA Final Four to Mississippi State. The second streak counts 90 consecutive wins, including two undefeated seasons (2008–09 and 2009–10), and was delimited by two losses against Stanford, the first on April 6, 2008, in the National Semifinals of the NCAA Tournament, and the second – three seasons later – on December 19, 2010. The Huskies also own the longest winning streak in regular-season games in college history; after an overtime loss to Stanford on November 17, 2014, they won their next 126 regular-season games until a 68–57 loss to Baylor on January 3, 2019.

UConn's current head coach is Luigi "Geno" Auriemma, who joined the team in 1985. His 1277 wins are the most by any NCAA coach in basketball, and his 1277–165 (.886) record as of February 2026 represents the highest winning percentage among NCAA basketball coaches (minimum 10 seasons), any level, men's or women's.

UConn has also been one of the leaders in women's basketball attendance; the team plays its home games at both Harry A. Gampel Pavilion in Storrs and the PeoplesBank Arena in Hartford.

== History ==
=== Connecticut Agricultural College (1899-1933) ===
The land-grant college fielded basketball teams for women that it called Co-Ed in 1925. The 1925 team played seven games. The 1927 yearbook states "Basketball is the major sport for women students and the one by which girls secure the Co-ed major "C"." That team finished 3–4.

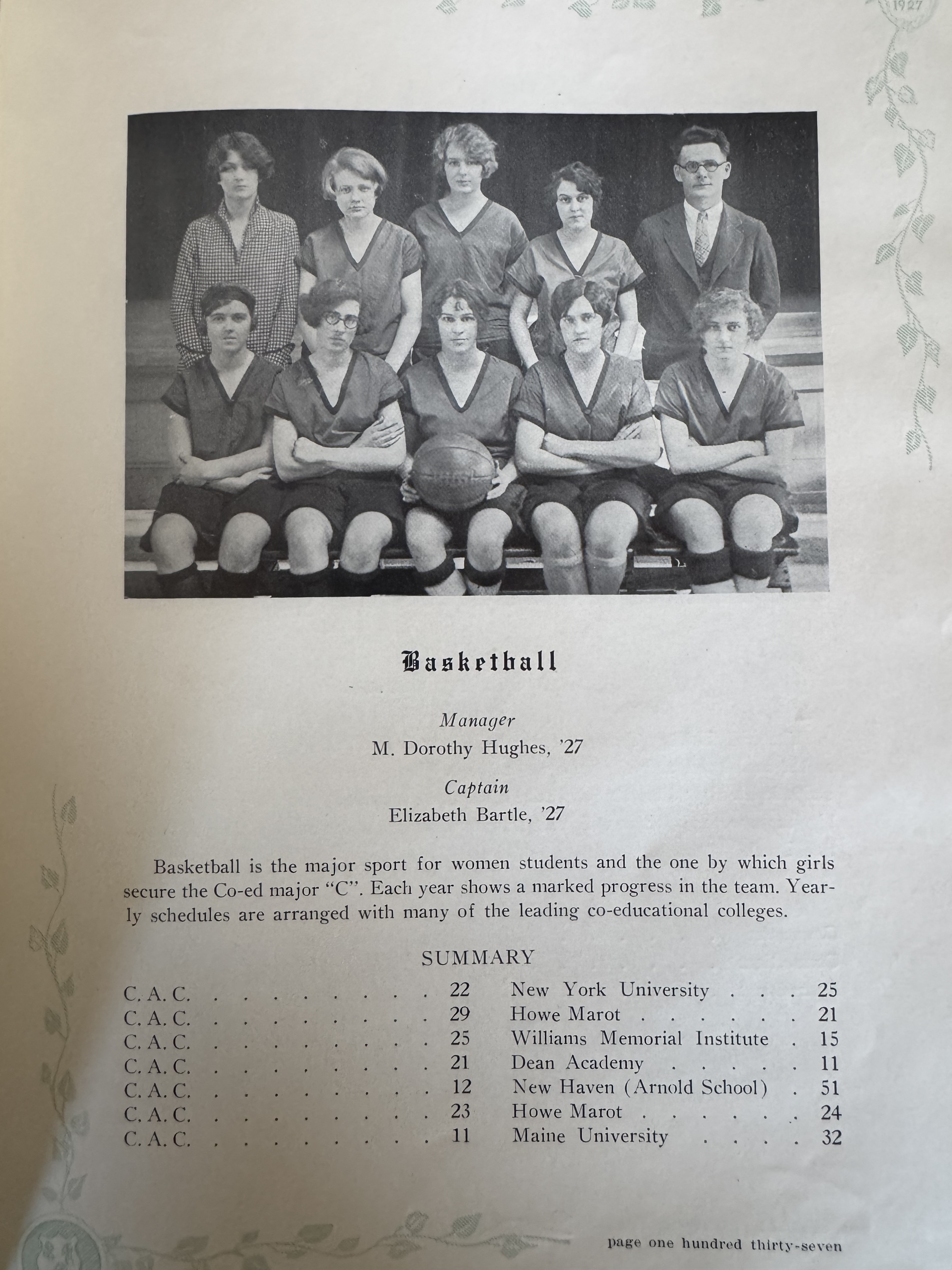
The 1925 Nutmeg yearbook entry for the Connecticut Agricultural College women's basketball team, known as co-eds.

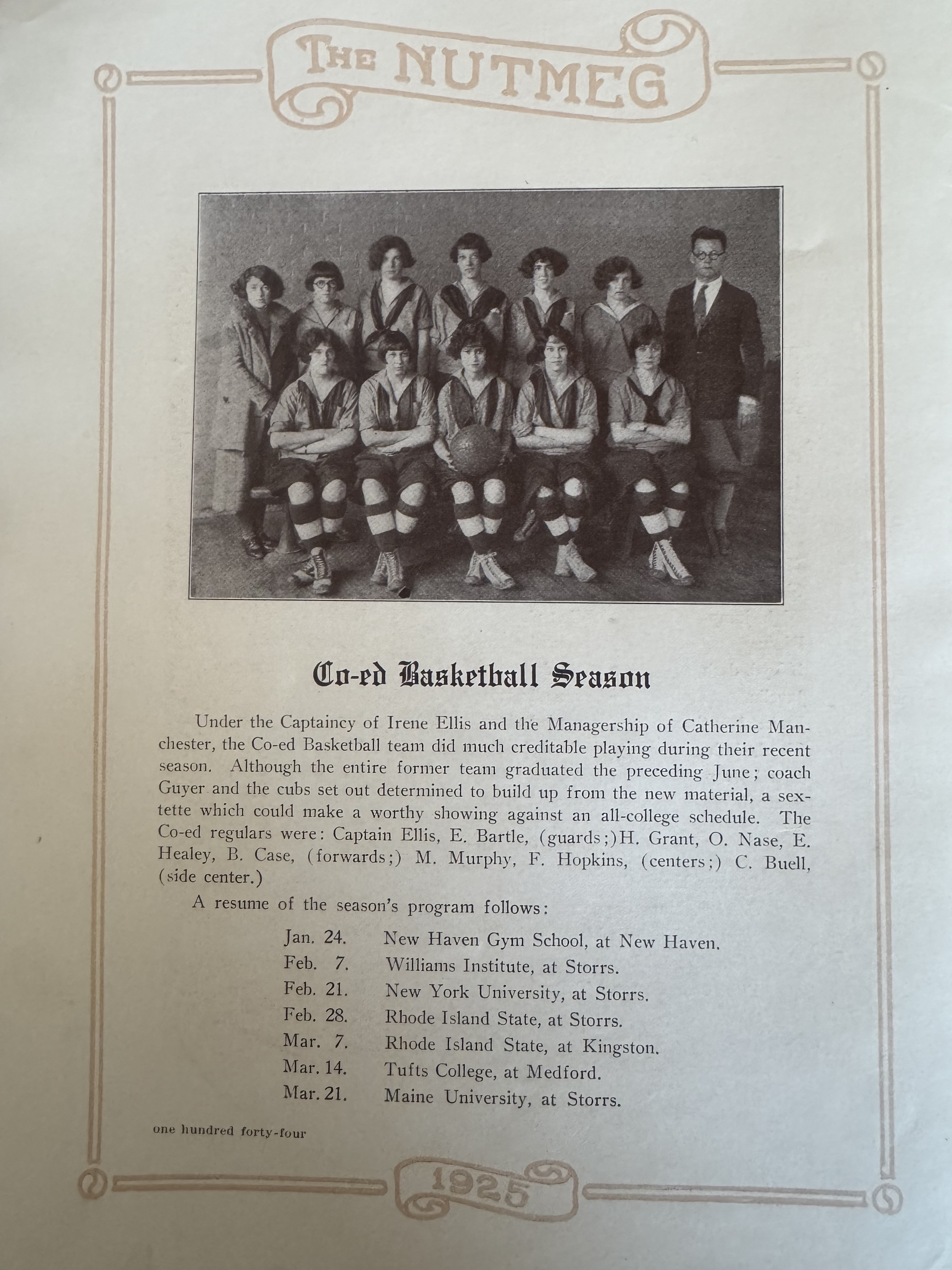
The 1925 Nutmeg yearbook entry for the CT Agricultural College woman's basketball team does not include the results of any of the games they played.

=== Early Years (1974–1985) ===
The UConn Huskies' first ever game was played on December 5, 1974, and was a 40–27 win over visiting Eastern Connecticut State University. After winning their first two games, the team lost the other eight in a 10-game season. The team had a losing record during its first six seasons under coaches Sandra Hamm (1974–75) and Wanda Flora (1975–80), and only one winning season in five seasons under Jean Balthaser (1980–85).

=== Arrival of Coach Auriemma (1985–1991) ===
Prior to the 1985–86 season, UConn hired Geno Auriemma as their new head coach, who had served as assistant coach at Virginia, with the goal of revitalizing the program. Auriemma's training skills had an immediate impact, and the team showed steady signs of progress: after going 12–15 in his first season in 1985–86, Auriemma led UConn to winning seasons in 1986–87 and 1987–88.

Auriemma pulled off one of his biggest and most important early recruiting successes in 1987 when he persuaded an All-American from New Hampshire, Kerry Bascom, to come to UConn. Bascom had an immediate impact on the UConn program. In 1989 she won the Big East Player of the Year award as a sophomore (she also won the award in her junior and senior years) and led UConn to its first Big East regular season and tournament titles, along with its first-ever NCAA tournament appearance at a #8 seed. However, the Huskies season ended in the first round with a loss to #9 seed La Salle, 72–63.

With Bascom and teammates Laura Lishness, Megan Pattyson, Wendy Davis and Debbie Baer, UConn reached the NCAA Tournament again in 1990 as a #4 seed, losing 61–59 to Clemson in the second round after a first-round bye.

==== 1990–1991: National Breakthrough Season ====
In Auriemma's 6th season (1990–91) the Huskies broke through on the national scene, again capturing the Big East regular season and tournament titles, and earning a #3 seed in the East Regional of the NCAA Tournament, its highest seed up to then. UConn beat Toledo 81–80 at Gampel Pavilion in the opening round, with Bascom scoring an NCAA tournament single-game record 39 points. The Huskies then moved on to the regionals at The Palestra in Auriemma's hometown of Philadelphia. Here, the team upset heavily favored ACC power North Carolina State in the Sweet 16 by 11 points, and then defeated Clemson 60–57 in the Elite Eight to advance to their first-ever Final Four (also a first for any Big East school). UConn's season ended with a 61–55 loss to top-seeded Virginia in the National semifinals at Lakefront Arena in New Orleans. Bascom was hit with early foul trouble and Virginia held off a late UConn rally. Including all tournament games, Bascom had set a new UConn scoring record with 2,177 points during her years at the school. The 1990–91 season is widely credited with bringing UConn's women's basketball program into the national spotlight for the first time. It also followed the men's 1989–90 "Dream Season", which brought that program into the national spotlight as well.

=== Rebecca Lobo Era (1991–1995) ===
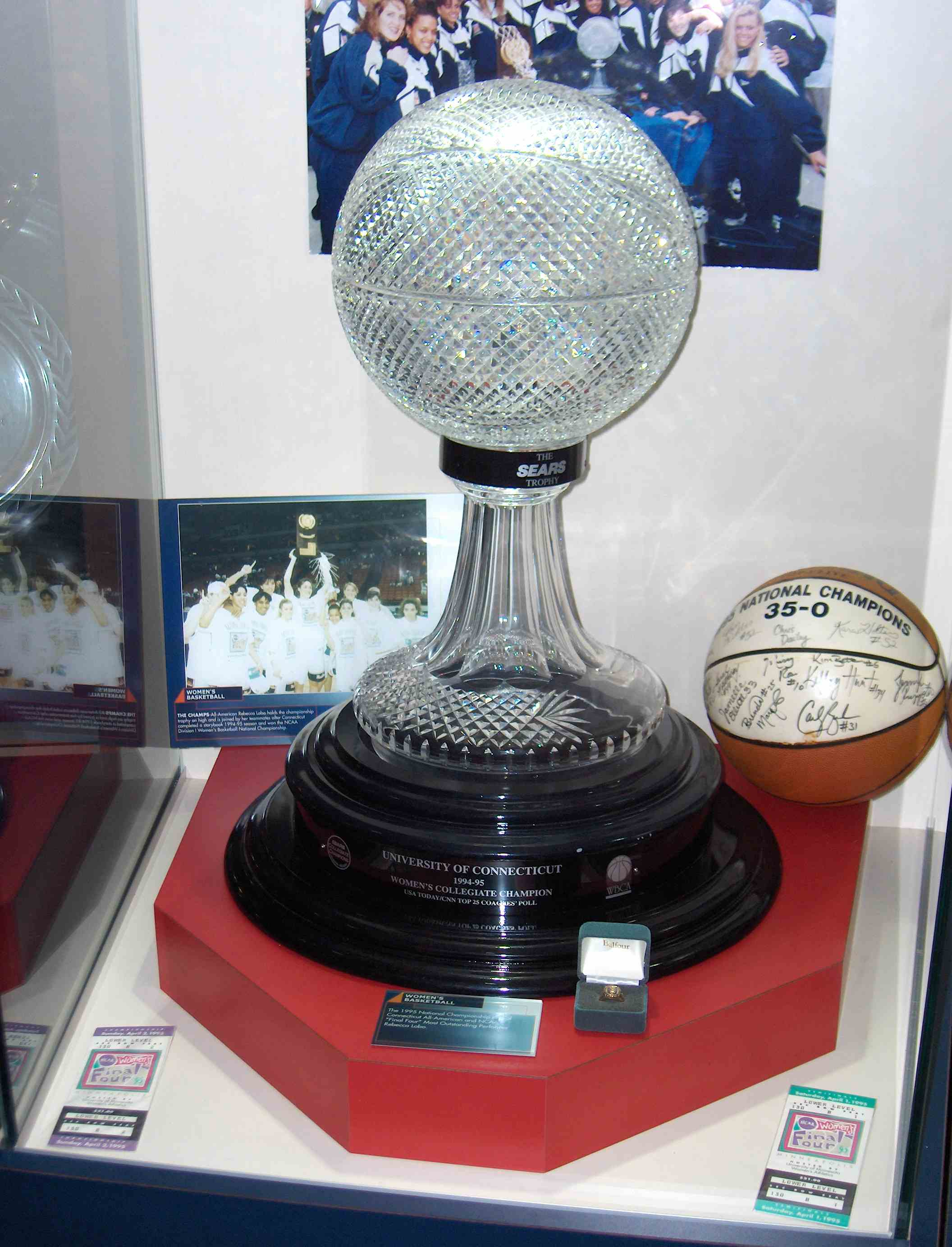
1995 Championship trophy, ring, and signed ball

UConn followed up its surprise run to the Final Four in 1991 by landing All-American Rebecca Lobo from Southwick, Massachusetts.

UConn had modest success in Lobo's first 2 seasons, losing early in the NCAA Tournament in both seasons. In 1993–94, UConn had its most successful season up to that point; led by Lobo and teammates Jamelle Elliott, Jennifer Rizzotti, Pam Webber, Kara Wolters and Carla Berube, UConn won 30 games for the first time in program history, winning the Big East tournament and regular-season titles. In the NCAA tournament, the Huskies were awarded a #1 seed for the first time ever, having achieved a 27–2 record prior to the tournament. UConn managed to reach the Elite Eight, but came up short in its hopes to make it back to the Final Four, losing to eventual champion North Carolina, 81–69.

==== 1995 National Championship: Undefeated (35–0) ====
With every major player back from 1994, and the addition of Auriemma's most highly ranked recruit to date (Connecticut Player of the Year Nykesha Sales), UConn was in for a season to remember in 1994–95. The season started with an 80-point win over Morgan State; two weeks later, UConn defeated powerhouse North Carolina State by 23 points on the road. This season also saw the birth of one of the greatest rivalries in college sports, the UConn-Tennessee rivalry, that began when the two teams met for the first time on Martin Luther King Day at Gampel Pavilion. UConn defeated Tennessee 77–66 in front of a sold-out crowd in a game televised on ESPN and soon afterwards became ranked No. 1 in the polls for the first time in program history.

UConn went unbeaten through the conference regular season and Tournament and easily advanced into the NCAA tournament. In the Elite Eight against Virginia, a 4-point win (their closest game of the year) secured the team's place in the Final Four at the Target Center in Minneapolis. UConn blew out Stanford in the semifinals 87–60 to reach the national championship game for a rematch against Tennessee. In the title game, UConn found itself in early trouble when Lobo was called for three personal fouls in 94 seconds in the first half. However, in the second half the team was able to rally from a 9-point deficit, and a key Rizzotti layup gave UConn the lead with less than 2 minutes to go. UConn won the game with a final score of 70–64 and claimed the program's first ever national title. Rebecca Lobo was named the Final Four's Most Outstanding Player.

With a perfect 35–0 record, UConn became only the fifth Division I women's basketball team to go undefeated en route to a national championship, and only the second since the NCAA era began in 1982. The Huskies also became the first unbeaten team in NCAA history, all divisions, men or women, to win 35 games in a season.

The 1994–95 UConn team was widely credited with increasing interest in women's basketball. The team was honored with a parade in Hartford, CT, that drew over 100,000 spectators. The team won the Team of the Year Award at the ESPN ESPY awards that year, and Lobo became a popular symbol of the sport. UConn also signed a landmark deal during the season with Connecticut Public Television to broadcast their games.

Lobo graduated in 1995, receiving countless accolades: the Naismith College Player of the Year award, the Wade Trophy, the Associated Press Women's College Basketball Player of the Year award, the USBWA Women's National Player of the Year award, the Honda-Broderick Cup, the Best Female Athlete ESPY Award (first basketball player ever), the Associated Press Athlete of the Year (second basketball player after Sheryl Swoopes), the NCAA Woman of the Year Award, the Academic All-America of the Year, and made the All-sports Academic All-America of the Year.

In 2010 Lobo became the first Connecticut player inducted into the Women's Basketball Hall of Fame, among a class of six inductees, followed by teammate Jennifer Rizzotti in the class of 2013.

=== A New Powerhouse is Born (1995–2000) ===
After the 1995 Championship, UConn rose to national prominence as one of the powerhouses in women's college basketball, giving coach Auriemma the chance to recruit star talents from high school like Shea Ralph in 1996 and Svetlana Abrosimova in 1997.

==== Escalation of Rivalry with Tennessee ====
Starting with their two meetings in 1995, the rivalry between the Tennessee Lady Vols and UConn escalated through the late 1990s and into the 2000s, becoming the marquee matchup in all women's sports, and taking on parallels to the Red Sox-Yankees rivalry in Major League Baseball. Geno Auriemma jokingly once referred to Pat Summitt and Tennessee as the "evil empire", like Red Sox president and CEO Larry Lucchino said of the Yankees.

In the 1995–96 season, UConn ended Tennessee's home court winning streak at Thompson–Boling Arena in Knoxville. Tennessee avenged itself in the Final Four that year in Charlotte, defeating UConn 88–83 in overtime; the game is often thought to be one of the more memorable games in NCAA tournament history, with many back and forth swings of momentum throughout.

UConn defeated Tennessee during the 1996–97 regular season yet again. However, after a season-ending injury for Shea Ralph in the first round of the NCAA tournament, UConn reached the Regional Final where the two teams met again, with Tennessee prevailing and ending Connecticut's unbeaten season by winning 91–81.

Tennessee handily defeated Connecticut 84–69 in the 1997–98 regular season in a game played Thompson-Boling arena. A mini controversy erupted in the days after the game when Tennessee's Chamique Holdsclaw was quoted in the papers as saying UConn looked scared during the game; Auriemma denounced that quote. With Shea Ralph and senior Nykesha Sales out for the entire season due to injuries, freshman Svetlana Abrosimova led a young UConn team to the NCAA Tournament Regional Final, where they eventually lost to North Carolina State, 60–52.

==== 1998–1999: Arrival of the TASSK Force ====
Auriemma signed his best recruiting class to date in 1998 when he signed five top 15 nationally ranked players. High school All-Americans Swin Cash, Tamika Williams, Sue Bird, Asjha Jones, and Keirsten Walters were dubbed "TASSK Force" by Connecticut fans, using the players' initials. The class renewed hope of bringing more championships to UConn after watching archrival Tennessee win three in a row.

The first season for the highly ranked class in 1998–99 featured mixed results and featured many injuries: Sue Bird tore her ACL and went out for the season after only 10 games. In their 1999 meeting at Gampel Pavilion, Tennessee prevailed over the Huskies again, winning 92–81. During the game there was a scuffle involving Tennessee's Semeka Randall and Connecticut's Svetlana Abrosimova where Randall threw the ball down, hitting Abrosimova's head. UConn fans booed Randall the rest of the game and Tennessee fans later gave her the nickname "Boo." The 1998–99 season ended in the Sweet Sixteen round of the NCAA Tournament, where UConn lost 64–58 to Iowa State, falling short of reaching the Final Four for the third consecutive year.

==== 2000 National Championship ====
Motivated by their previous disappointing season, UConn returned in 1999–2000 with the clear goal of reaching championship level again. Led by upperclassmen Shea Ralph, Kelly Schumacher, Svetlana Abrosimova and the TASS Force (the K was dropped when Keirsten Walters had to give up basketball due to knee problems), UConn went through the regular season with a 27–1 record, with their only loss being a single-point defeat to Tennessee at home. UConn went 1–1 against Tennessee during the regular season, having defeated the Lady Vols at their home court earlier in the year by an 8-point margin.

In the NCAA tournament, the Huskies easily advanced to their first Final Four since 1996 and handily defeated Penn State in the National Semifinals, winning 89–67. The team then met the Lady Vols for the championship game in Auriemma's hometown of Philadelphia. Despite the two regular season meetings being close battles, UConn used tenacious defense and backdoor cuts to overwhelm Tennessee 71–52 for their second national championship. Connecticut's final season record was 36–1, and Shea Ralph was named the Final Four's MVP.

=== Diana Taurasi Era (2000–2004) ===
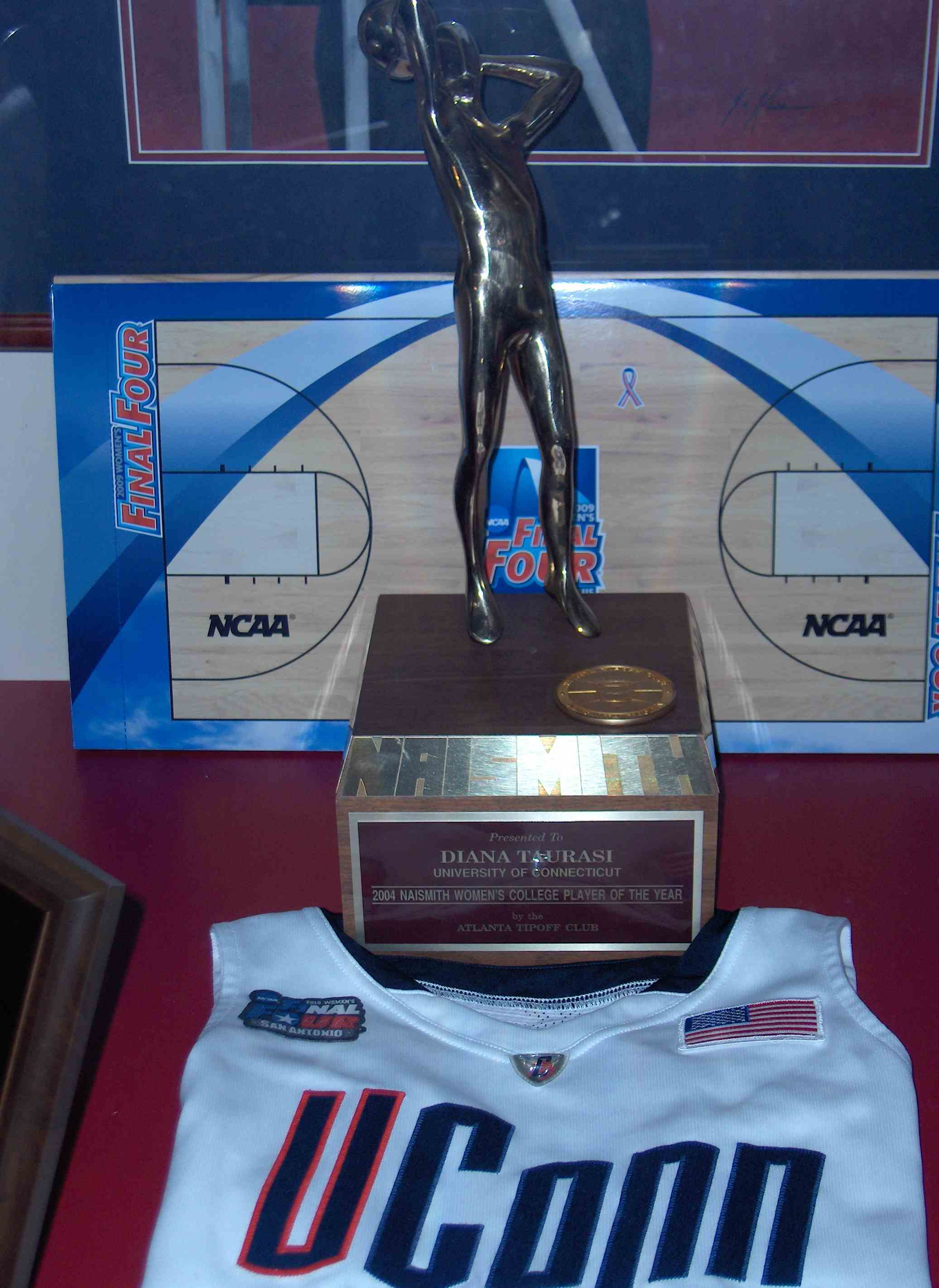
Diana Taurasi Naismith Award

Auriemma pulled off another huge recruiting coup when he convinced All-American guard Diana Taurasi to travel across country to attend Connecticut. Taurasi hailed from Chino, California, and attended Don Lugo High School where she was the recipient of the 2000 Cheryl Miller Award, presented by the Los Angeles Times to the best player in southern California. She was also named the 2000 Naismith and Parade Magazine National High School Player of the Year. Taurasi finished her high school career ranked second to Cheryl Miller in state history with 3,047 points.

With Taurasi joining the core of the 2000 Championship team, Auriemma confidently predicted another championship in 2001, but the season turned out to be more difficult than expected. UConn won the Big East tournament over rising powerhouse Notre Dame in a game remembered for the Bird at the Buzzer shot, but lost key players Abrosimova and Ralph to season-ending injuries. As a consequence, Taurasi had to play a much larger role than anticipated in the NCAA Tournament. She led UConn to the Final Four, but in the National Semifinals against Notre Dame in St. Louis, Taurasi had a poor shooting game, and despite UConn having attained a 16-point lead at one point, the team lost 90–75. Notre Dame went on to win its first national championship.

==== 2002 National Championship: Undefeated (39–0) ====
As with the 2000 champions, who had also come off a disappointing loss the year before, UConn returned hungrier than ever in 2001–02. With the TASS force in their senior season and Taurasi emerging as a star in her sophomore year, UConn rolled through all its opponents throughout the year and maintained an undefeated record going into the NCAA Tournament. The team easily won the Big East regular season and tournament trophies, defeating Boston College 96–54 in the Big East championship game. In the NCAA Tournament, the Huskies were once again awarded the #1 overall seed and then demolished their opponents in the early rounds to ultimately advance to their 3rd consecutive Final Four. Their smallest margin of victory was an 18-point win over Penn State in the Sweet 16.

In the National Semifinals, UConn used tenacious offensive play to defeat rival Tennessee by a whopping 23 points, winning 79–56. In front of a record-breaking crowd at the Alamodome in San Antonio, UConn defeated Oklahoma 82–70 in the championship game to complete a perfect 39–0 season. The starting five of Bird, Taurasi, Cash, Jones, and Williams is widely regarded as the best starting five in women's college basketball history. The championship game that year shattered ratings for ESPN and at the time was the highest rated college basketball game to air on the network, men's or women's.

==== 2003 National Championship ====
With the TASS force graduated, Diana Taurasi had to carry most of the load in her junior season, with help from returning teammates Maria Conlon, Jessica Moore and Ashley Battle and a top-ranked recruiting class that included Ann Strother, Barbara Turner, Willnet Crockett and Nicole Wolff. With no seniors on the roster, 2003 was supposed to be a rebuilding year for UConn, but as the year progressed it became clear that Taurasi was up to the challenge of carrying a group of young players to the championship game. UConn finished the regular season undefeated and established a 70-game winning streak, shattering the previous mark of 54 set by Louisiana Tech; the streak ended in the Big East championship game with a 52–48 loss to Villanova. Notable wins during the season included a 63–62 victory over No. 5 Tennessee in overtime on January 4, 2003, as well as a 77–65 win at No. 1 Duke on February 1, 2003.

In the NCAA Tournament, UConn easily advanced to the Final Four at the Georgia Dome in Atlanta. UConn rallied from a 9-point deficit to beat Texas 71–69 in the National Semifinals and advance to the National Championship. Aided by Taurasi's 28 points in the championship game, the Huskies defeated rival Tennessee 73–68 to claim the program's fourth national championship. UConn became the first team ever to win a championship without a senior on their roster, and remains the only team to have done so as of 2025.

==== 2004 National Championship ====
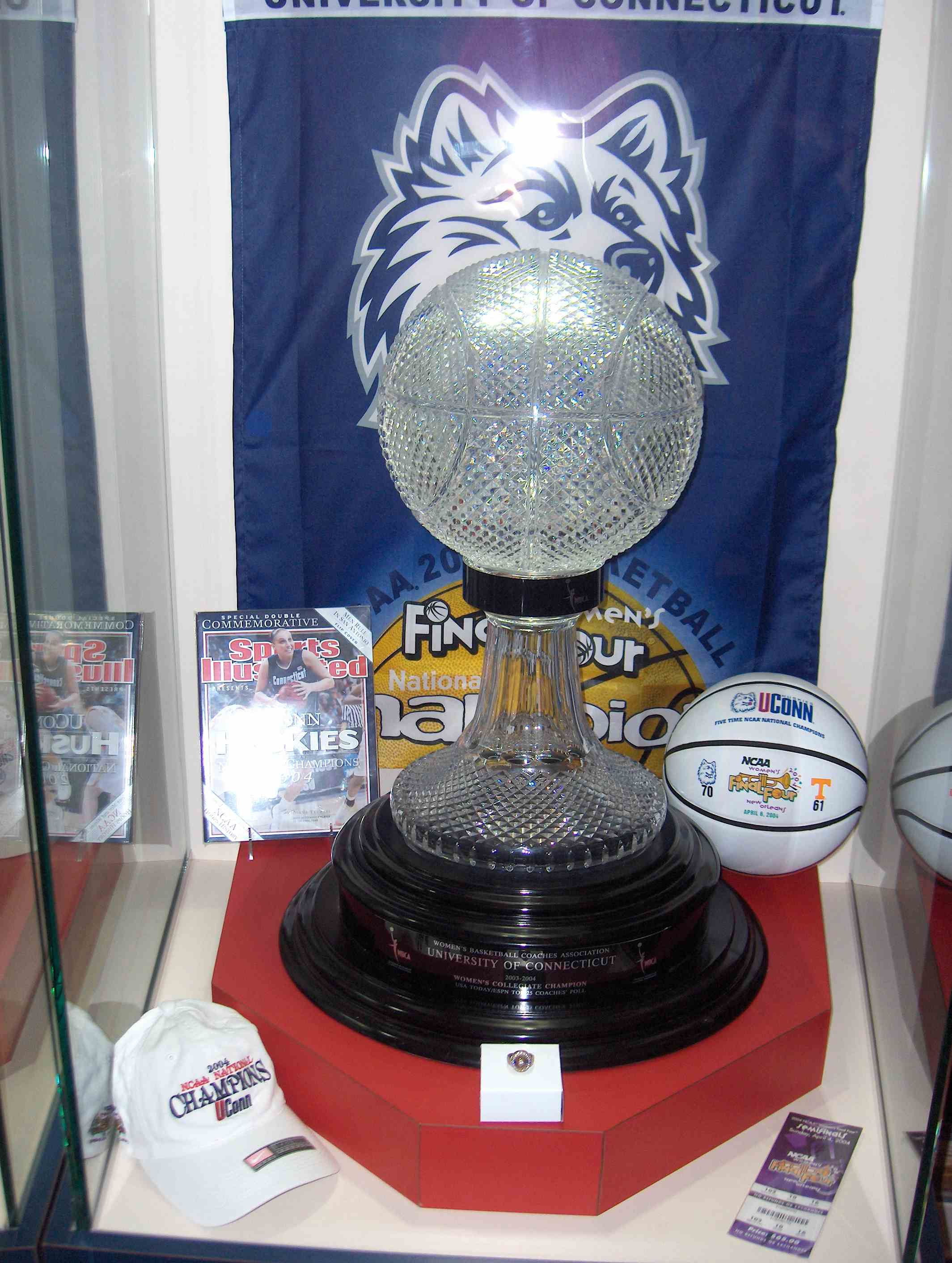
2004 Championship trophy, ring, and signed ball

Although the entire team returned and expectations were sky high for a "three-peat" in Taurasi's senior year, UConn had an uneven season. The team suffered losses to Notre Dame, Duke, and Villanova, while also losing to Boston College in the semifinals of the Big East tournament.

The Huskies finally found their rhythm during the NCAA Tournament, in which they were a #2 seed; in the Elite Eight they beat top-seeded Penn State 66–49 to advance to their 5th straight Final Four at the New Orleans Arena. After beating Minnesota in the National Semifinals 67–58, UConn again defeated Tennessee to win their 3rd consecutive national championship, winning 70–61. The teams overall record for the season was 31–4. The 2004 women's National Championship was especially notable as the UConn men's basketball team won the men's title the previous night, marking the first time one University won both the men's and women's basketball championships in one season, a feat UConn repeated in 2014.

In her career at UConn, Taurasi led the team to four consecutive Final Fours and three straight national titles. Prior to that final championship, her coach, Geno Auriemma, predicted his team's likelihood of winning with the statement, "We have Diana, and you don't."

Taurasi received many personal accolades at UConn including the 2003 and 2004 Naismith College Player of the Year awards, the 2003 Wade Trophy, the 2003 Associated Press Women's College Basketball Player of the Year award, the 2003 USBWA Women's National Player of the Year award and the 2004 Best Female Athlete ESPY Award. Taurasi was the third basketball player to receive this final honor, after former UConn star Rebecca Lobo and Tennessee star Chamique Holdsclaw. She achieved legendary status among UConn fans, and is widely considered one of the greatest players of all time.

=== Rebuilding Years (2004–2007) ===
Relative to their high standards, UConn struggled during the first two years following Taurasi's graduation in 2004. Some of its highly touted recruits did not play up to expectations while others suffered injuries. Taken together during the three years 2005–2007, UConn never made a Final Four, something that had become almost routine (7 final fours in 10 years from 1995 to 2004).

The 2004–05 season was marked with sloppy play and ragged offense; UConn lost 8 games and failed to win the Big East regular season crown for the first time since 1993. In the NCAA tournament, UConn lost to Stanford 76–59 in the Sweet Sixteen.

In the 2005–06 season, UConn showed some signs of improvement, winning the Big East tournament and beating Georgia in the Sweet Sixteen thanks to a fadeaway 3-pointer with 1.8 seconds left by senior Barbara Turner. Behind a home state crowd, UConn almost upset #1 ranked Duke in the NCAA Tournament regional final, before falling in overtime by 2 points.

In the 2006–07 season, the team improved their record with the additions of Renee Montgomery, Mel Thomas, Ketia Swanier, and the #1 ranked high school player Tina Charles, helping UConn emerge as a national contender again. UConn was a #1 seed in the NCAA tournament, but eventually lost to LSU 73–50 in the regional final (Elite Eight) to end their season with a 32–4 record. This season would be the last one in which UConn did not make the Final Four until 2023.

=== Maya Moore Era (2007–2011) ===
After three down years by UConn standards, the team emerged as a heavy contender for the championship in the 2007–08 season. In addition to all of the star players returning from the 2006–07 team, #1 ranked high school player Maya Moore joined the Huskies after a bitter recruitment battle between UConn and Tennessee. Shortly after Moore's commitment to UConn, Tennessee announced they were cancelling the annual series with UConn, thus ending one of the biggest rivalries in the sport. Even if both coaches remained vague and unspecific about the reasons of the cancellation, Tennessee filed a complaint to the NCAA about UConn's recruitment of Moore. UConn was found to have committed a secondary violation (involving a tour of the ESPN campus) and no punishment was handed out.

Despite losing Mel Thomas and Kalana Greene to season-ending knee injuries, UConn went through the 2007–08 regular season with only a single loss at Rutgers by two points, winning both the Big East regular season and tournament titles. Rallying from a 14-point deficit in the NCAA tournament regional final, they beat conference rival Rutgers 66–56 and advanced to their first Final Four since Taurasi graduated in 2004. These tournament victories were largely credited to senior Charde Houston, a top-ranked recruit out of San Diego viewed as not living up to expectations from Geno Auriemma and the UConn fans up to that point, but who came up with key rebounds and clutch points in those games. In the National Semifinals, UConn lost to Stanford 82–73, ending its season with a 36–2 record.

==== 2009 National Championship: Undefeated (39–0) ====
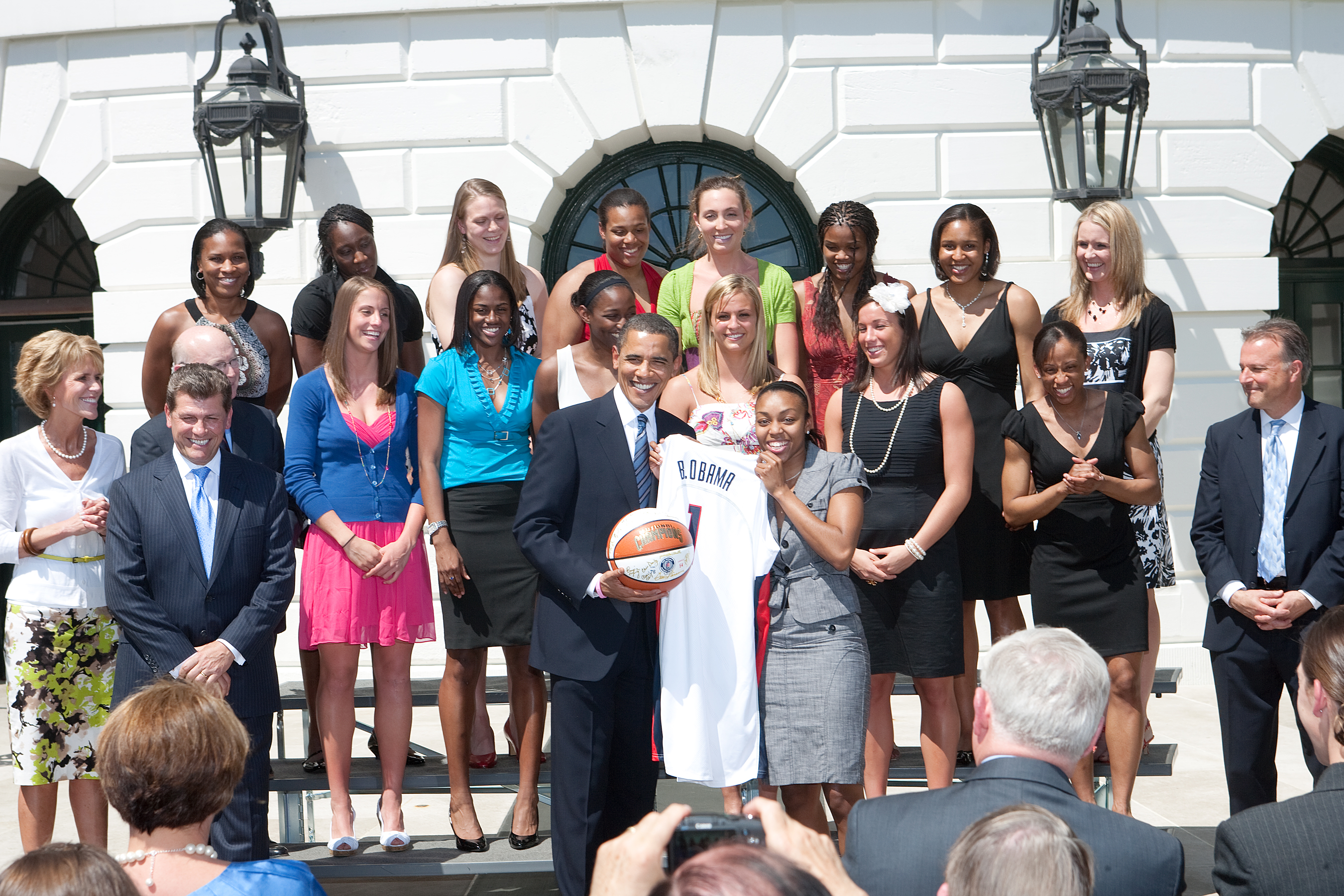
The players, coaches, and other staff of the 2008–09 UConn Huskies, winners of the 2009 national championship, are honored at the White House by President Barack Obama on April 27, 2009.

For the third consecutive year, UConn successfully recruited the top ranked high school player in Elena Delle Donne, but shortly before enrolling at UConn Delle Donne requested a release from her scholarship, giving up basketball in order to stay closer to home and play volleyball at the University of Delaware; Delle Donne would eventually play basketball at Delaware, having a great college career that culminated in the #2 pick in the 2013 WNBA draft. Despite losing Delle Donne, the Huskies were ranked No. 1 in the preseason polls, having returned 10 players from their 2008 Final Four team (including All-Americans Maya Moore, Renee Montgomery and Tina Charles), in addition to Kalana Greene (who had recovered from her knee injury by this point).

UConn finished the regular season undefeated for the 5th time in school history with a 30–0 record. They won their 17th Big East Regular Season title and their 15th Big East tournament title, beating the Louisville Cardinals in the championship game. The Huskies advanced to their 10th Final Four with an 83–64 victory over Arizona State, and then to their 6th NCAA Championship Game in program history by defeating Stanford in the Final Four, also by a score of 83–64. In the championship game, UConn defeated Louisville 76–54 with help from Charles' 25 points and 19 boards, ending the season with a perfect 39–0 record (with every victory by at least 10 points, a record of its own) and sixth national title.

==== 2010 National Championship: Undefeated (39–0) ====
For the second consecutive year (and the sixth time in school history), UConn finished their regular season undefeated, with an average margin of victory of 35.9 points. During the regular season, UConn played 11 games against ranked opponents (including 6 in the top ten), winning by an average margin of 24 points per game. They dominated the Big East tournament yet again, winning the championship game 60–32. Throughout the regular season and the Big East tournament, UConn's closest win was against Stanford, by 12 points.

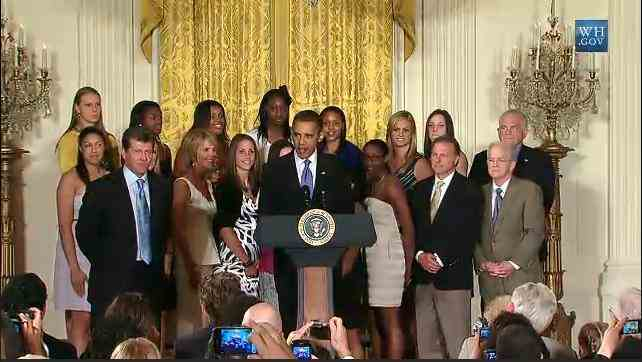
2010 NCAA National Champions Connecticut Huskies at the White House

Leading up to the Final Four in San Antonio, UConn dominated teams like Southern and Temple in the opening rounds, Iowa State in the Sweet 16, and Florida State in the Elite Eight. Maya Moore and Tina Charles played little more than half the minutes of every game, with Moore averaging one point per minute played, and the team outscoring its opponents by an average of 47 points. In the Final Four, UConn was finally challenged by Baylor and the 6-foot-8 freshman Brittney Griner; Baylor trailed 39–26 at halftime, cut the deficit to 41–38 with 15 minutes remaining in the game, but UConn finally pulled away for a final score of 70–50.

The national championship game against Stanford was a different story. UConn started the game with its worst first half in school history by scoring only 12 points; only 11 teams in tournament history have been held to 12 points or less in the first half: three of them were against UConn teams, and two of them (Southern and Temple) just days earlier in the 2010 Tournament. Stanford itself only managed to score 20 points in the first half. Maya Moore gave UConn the lead (23–22) in the second half with a three-pointer and led the team on a scoring run that eventually secured the national championship with a final score of 53–47. It was the only game in the Huskies' 78-game winning streak that was won by fewer than 10 points. Moore was named the Tournament Most Outstanding Player, to go along with her second straight Wade Trophy award and Academic All-America of the Year award. Charles, who won the John R. Wooden Award and Naismith College Player of the Year awards, was chosen first overall in the WNBA draft days later.

==== 2010–2011: New Record, but No Championship ====
The 2010–11 season began with high hopes but much uncertainty for the Huskies. Maya Moore returned for her senior season after a summer with the U.S. National team, but UConn lost major contributors in Tina Charles and Kalana Greene, who graduated in 2010. Additionally, junior guard Caroline Doty would be out the entire season due to a third knee injury. In an early test, UConn squeaked by #2 Baylor in their second game of the season. They powered their way through 8 more consecutive wins for their 88th straight victory, beating #10 Ohio State at Madison Square Garden. Their 89th win came at home against #20 Florida State to set the college basketball record for most consecutive wins, previously held by the UCLA men's team. After a break in the schedule for the holidays, UConn traveled out west and beat the Pacific Tigers to stretch the streak to 90 games. That game, however, was largely a warm-up match for their biggest test of the season, a December 30 matchup at their rival powerhouse Stanford Cardinals. UConn trailed for the entire game and lost for the first time since their April 6, 2008 Final Four appearance (also against the Cardinals). The loss ended the highly publicized 90 game winning streak, as well as their long-held spot as the top ranked team in women's basketball which was taken over by Baylor. Connecticut recovered focus after the loss and got through the rest of the regular season undefeated, regaining the #1 ranking along the way after Baylor's loss to Texas Tech in February. They marched through and won the Big East tournament, including their 3rd victory of the year over Notre Dame in the Big East tournament Championship Game.

In the NCAA tournament Final Four, UConn met Notre Dame for the fourth time of the season, with the underdog Fighting Irish prevailing 72–63 and ending UConn's bid for a third straight national championship. The keys to Notre Dame's success were the stellar performance of sophomore Skylar Diggins and the hot shooting (over 50 percent from the field, a first against UConn in its last 262 games), while UConn had a lack of support for Moore's 36 points. Notre Dame went on to the national championship game, but were ultimately defeated by the Texas A&M Aggies.

During the 2010–11 season, Maya Moore posted career highs in scoring (22.3 ppg), assists (4.1 apg) and steals (2.2 spg), sweeping all possible individual honors: she won her 2nd Naismith College Player of the Year award, her 3rd straight Wade Trophy (only player in history - freshmen are not eligible for this award), her 2nd Associated Press Women's College Basketball Player of the Year award, her 2nd USBWA Women's National Player of the Year award and her 2nd John R. Wooden Award; she was also voted Big East Player of The Year (3rd time) and a fourth straight unanimous First-Team All-American in WBCA, USBWA and AP polls (second player ever after Oklahoma's Courtney Paris).

In her astounding college career, Maya Moore won 150 games and only lost 4, amassing a total 3036 points (1st Husky ever and 4th all-time in NCAA division I women's basketball), 1276 rebounds (2nd Husky ever), 310 steals (3rd Husky ever), 544 assists (6th Husky ever) and 204 blocks (4th Husky ever); she is the only women's basketball player in Division I history to record 2500 points, 1000 rebounds, 500 assists, 250 steals and 150 blocked shots. On February 28, she was enshrined in the Huskies of Honor (3rd time ever for an active player).

Maya Moore was also an intelligent college student; she graduated with a 3.7 GPA, earning the Elite 88 Award, and was named Cosida Academic All-America First-Team in 2009, 2010 and 2011, Cosida Academic All-America of the Year in 2010 and 2011 (1st player to ever repeat) and All-sports Academic All-America of the Year in 2011.

After graduation, Maya Moore was selected by the Minnesota Lynx as the 1st overall pick in the 2011 WNBA draft (4th time for a Husky), also becoming the first female basketball player signed to the Jordan Brand.

=== Calm Before the Storm (2011–2012 Season) ===
The 2011–12 season would inevitably be a new era after Maya Moore's graduation. Her absence and the loss of 6th-man Lorin Dixon left significant holes to fill in the roster. Geno Auriemma seemed to find the right pieces with a freshman class that included Kaleena Mosqueda-Lewis, Brianna Banks and Kiah Stokes. Mosqueda-Lewis was another State Farm/WBCA High School Player of the Year for UConn, Banks was a highly rated point guard, and Stokes, a 6'3 post player, was highly ranked as well. Other key players included sophomores Stefanie Dolson and Bria Hartley, junior Kelly Faris and senior Tiffany Hayes, who would be all selected in the WNBA draft after graduation.

Even if the Huskies were still a strong national contender, they were no longer viewed as a favorite to win it all. Two key rivals were usual conference foe Notre Dame and their new rival Baylor, who had the nation's top player in Brittney Griner. In December, Griner led #1 ranked Baylor against #2 UConn, scoring 25 points to go along with nine blocks. The 66–61 loss was UConn's first of the season, but not its last. Notre Dame, led by junior star Skylar Diggins, beat the Huskies twice in the regular season, but UConn was able to reverse the roles in the Big East tournament Championship Game, where they defeated Notre Dame 63–54. The win was the school's 15th conference title, as well as the 800th career win for coach Geno Auriemma. Ultimately Notre Dame found its revenge with an upset win in the NCAA Tournament Final Four, winning in overtime 83–75. The Fighting Irish finished the season with a 3–1 record against the Huskies, a record that would be repeated the following year. Ultimately, the Huskies finished the season with a 33–5 overall record, with 3 losses to Notre Dame, 1 to Baylor, and 1 to St. John's.

=== Breanna Stewart Era (2012–2016) ===
==== 2013 National Championship ====
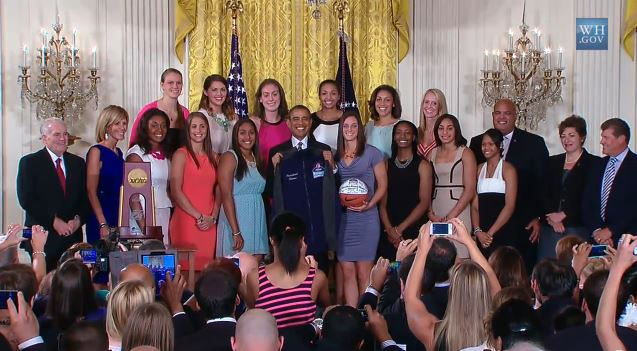
The 2013 UConn Women's Basketball team is greeted by President Obama at the White House

The 2012–13 season began with high hopes for UConn. The team landed three highly ranked recruits: #1 overall Breanna Stewart from Cicero – North Syracuse High School, forward Morgan Tuck and guard Moriah Jefferson. Their play was uneven during the regular season, where the team went 27–3 with a loss to Baylor and a pair of losses to Notre Dame (including a three-overtime game in South Bend). In the Big East tournament, UConn lost for a third straight time to Notre Dame, who delivered a last-minute comeback to win 61–59. However, in the NCAA tournament, key-players Breanna Stewart, Kaleena Mosqueda-Lewis, Stefanie Dolson and senior Kelly Faris raised their level of play significantly, and UConn easily advanced to the Final Four. In the National Semifinals, the team handily beat fellow #1 seed rival Notre Dame 83–65 in a rematch of the previous year's Final Four. Two days later, the Huskies obtained a 93–60 win over #5 seed Louisville in the championship game to garner a record tying eighth national championship. UConn finished the season with a 35–4 overall record, with 3 of their losses to Notre Dame.

The end of the 2012–13 season saw the breakup of the Big East Conference. First Pittsburgh, Syracuse, and Notre Dame defected to the Atlantic Coast Conference, with Louisville announcing that they would follow in 2014. Then, the non-FBS football playing members of the Big East (Georgetown, Villanova, Providence, DePaul, Marquette, Seton Hall, St. John's), known colloquially as the "Catholic 7", left to form their own conference, taking the conference name with them. The remaining teams of the former Big East (Connecticut and Cincinnati) joined the new American Athletic Conference (The American or AAC), thus ending the UConn–Notre Dame rivalry in conference tournaments.

==== 2014 National Championship: Undefeated (40–0) ====
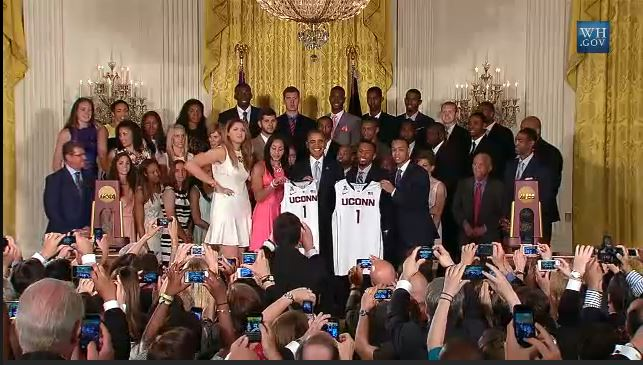
The UConn dual men's and women's national championship teams at the White House on June 9, 2014

With Faris and Doty graduated, sophomore Breanna Stewart became the undisputed leader of the 2013–14 UConn team, starting in all 40 games and leading the team with 19.4 points and 2.8 blocks per game; her 291 field goals made was the third-highest single-season total in UConn history.

The Huskies beat every opponent by at least 10 points during the season, with their average margin being 34.1 points. Some notable wins included a 76–57 victory over No. 3 ranked Stanford on November 11, 2013, and an 83–61 victory at No. 2 Duke on December 17. In the AAC tournament, the Huskies defeated every opponent by at least 20 points, including a 72–52 over No. 3 Louisville in the conference championship.

UConn was awarded the #1 overall seed in the NCAA Tournament and easily reached their 7th straight Final Four with a 69–54 win over #3 seed Texas A&M in the Elite Eight. In the National Semifinals, the Huskies routed #2 seed Stanford with a 75–56 victory to advance to the championship game. There, they met unbeaten Notre Dame, making it the first matchup of two undefeated teams in the championship game. UConn defeated Notre Dame 79–58 (hindered by the loss of one of their stars, Natalie Achonwa, who had torn her ACL in the Elite Eight) to finish the season 40–0, tying Baylor for the most wins in a season and setting a new record for women's national championships with nine (surpassing Tennessee). Breanna Stewart was named the AP Player of the year, only the third time in history a sophomore has won the honor. With the UConn men's basketball team winning the championship in 2014 as well, UConn became the only school in NCAA history to have both their men's and women's teams win a national championship in the same year, and do it twice (first time was 2004).

==== 2015 National Championship ====
The 2014–15 regular season started with an 88–86 overtime loss at No. 6 Stanford in the team's second game of the season, ending a 47-game winning streak for UConn. Led by juniors Stewart and Jefferson, as well as senior Kaleena Mosqueda-Lewis, UConn quickly recovered and won every remaining regular season game, including a 76–58 win at No. 2 ranked rival Notre Dame and an 87–62 win against No. 1 South Carolina. The loss against Stanford would be the team's last until the 2017 Final Four against Mississippi State, and hence began a record 111 game winning streak for UConn. In the NCAA Tournament, both UConn and Notre Dame were a #1 seed in their respective playoff brackets; each advanced to the Final Four as well. The Huskies handily defeated a fellow #1 seed in Maryland, 81–58, while Notre Dame narrowly beat #1 seeded South Carolina 66–65 in the National Semifinals.

The two teams met on April 7, 2015, in the national championship game for the second straight year. UConn won by a score of 63–53 to achieve their third straight national championship and tenth total, with coach Auriemma tying a record set by John Wooden in college basketball. The Huskies 10-point margin of victory in the championship game was their smallest since 2010. Their margins of victory in the 2013, 2014, and 2016 championship games were all above 20 points. UConn finished the season with a 38–1 overall record (18–0 in AAC play).

==== 2016 National Championship: Undefeated (38–0) ====
In 2015, UConn landed another top recruit in #1 High School prospect Katie Lou Samuelson; she quickly earned a spot in the starting five alongside sophomore Kia Nurse and seniors Breanna Stewart, Moriah Jefferson and Morgan Tuck. The team was unstoppable all season long, beating every opponent by an average of 39.7 points (including AP top-5 teams like Notre Dame and South Carolina), and easily winning the conference regular season and tournament championships. While other #1 seeds Notre Dame, South Carolina and Baylor suffered early upsets in the NCAA Tournament, UConn easily advanced to the Final Four after defeating #2 seed Texas 86–65 in the Elite Eight. In the National Semifinals, the team defeated #2 seed Oregon State 80–51 to advance to their fourth straight title game. In the championship game, the Huskies defeated old Big East rival Syracuse 82–51 to complete their sixth undefeated season (38–0), while also winning their 11th overall championship and 4th consecutive one. Geno Auriemma became the only coach in college basketball history to have won 11 titles, surpassing UCLA legend John Wooden (who has 10).

Senior Breanna Stewart was named the Final Four Most Outstanding Player for a record 4th straight time; she also performed a back-to-back sweep of all individual honors, winning her 2nd straight Wade Trophy, a record 3rd Associated Press Women's College Basketball Player of the Year award, a record 3rd USBWA Women's National Player of the Year award, a record 3rd Naismith College Player of the Year award and her 2nd straight John R. Wooden Award. Stewart finished with 2,676 points (2nd Husky ever), 1,179 rebounds (4th Husky ever), 426 assists and 414 blocked shots (1st Husky ever). She was also the #1 overall pick in the 2016 WNBA draft. Moriah Jefferson finished with a program-record 659 assists and a back-to-back Nancy Lieberman Award as best point guard in the nation. The trio of Stewart-Jefferson-Tuck ended their college career with a 151–5 record, the most victories for any group of college basketball players; they are the only 4-time winners in college basketball history (freshmen were not eligible to play during the UCLA men's streak). With their eleventh championship win in 2016, the UConn Huskies tied the UCLA Bruins men's team for most college basketball championships, and became the first Division I women's basketball team to win four straight national championships.

=== A New Record Streak Ends (2016–2020) ===
==== 2016–2017: Stunning Defeat at the Final Four ====
After losing the stellar trio of Stewart, Jefferson and Tuck, many predicted a sub-par season for UConn standards; the AP Poll ranked the team third in the nation, and coach Auriemma had designed a very tough non-conference calendar to test the strength of his young team. The first regular season game, a 78–76 win against #12 Florida State, seemed to confirm the expectations, with coach Auriemma predicting "a good beat" ahead. As the season progressed, however, the team quickly found its rhythm, beating AP top-5 teams like Baylor, Notre Dame and Maryland, and showcasing a talented core of young players. Along with sophomore Katie Lou Samuelson and junior Kia Nurse, the duo of sophomore Napheesa Collier and junior Gabby Williams quickly rose to national attention; even senior Saniya Chong, who had played only a few minutes in her first three seasons, showed great improvements, leading the nation in assists-to-turnovers ratio. Coming from a 75-win streak in the previous season, UConn tied its own previous 90-win record with a 102–37 win against South Florida on January 10, 2017; the 100th straight win mark was reached on February 13, 2017, with a 66–55 win against South Carolina.

After easy wins in both the conference regular season and conference tournament, UConn entered the NCAA tournament unbeaten, #1 overall, and once again a heavy favorite to win it all. They easily won their region and advanced to their 10th straight Final Four after defeating #10 seed Oregon 90–52 in the Elite Eight. However, the season came to an unexpected end when #2 seed Mississippi State's Morgan William hit a buzzer-beater to give its team a 66–64 overtime victory over UConn in the NCAA Final Four. The shocking loss ended UConn's winning streak at 111 consecutive wins, an all-time record not only for college basketball, but also for any team sport played at the college level.

==== 2017–2018: Final Four Deja Vu ====
UConn entered the 2017–18 season with high energy. The team gained a 5-star recruiting class that included future All-American player Megan Walker. On December 19, 2017, a win over Oklahoma gave coach Geno Auriemma his 1000th victory in just 1135 games, making him only the fourth women's coach to reach that plateau — preceded by Pat Summitt, Tara VanDerveer and Sylvia Hatchell — and the fastest one. UConn finished the regular season 16–0 in AAC play (and undefeated overall) to win the AAC regular season championship for the 4th consecutive year. The Huskies had 6 wins against AP top-10 opponents throughout the regular season, including an 80–71 victory over eventual national champion No. 3 Notre Dame on December 3, 2017. UConn ultimately defeated Tulane, Cincinnati, and No. 19 South Florida to win the AAC women's tournament title for a fifth straight year. As a result, they received the conference's automatic bid to the NCAA women's tournament.

As the #1 overall seed in the NCAA tournament, the Huskies defeated #16 seed Saint Francis (PA) and #9 seed Quinnipiac to advance to the Sweet Sixteen. UConn's win over Saint Francis was the largest in NCAA tournament history (men's or women's), as the Huskies defeated the Red Flash by 88 points, 140–52. The team defeated #5 seed Duke 72–59 in the Sweet Sixteen and #2 seed South Carolina 94–65 in the Elite Eight to reach their 19th Final Four. In the National Semifinals, UConn lost 91–89 in overtime on a last-second shot for a second consecutive year, this time to fellow #1 seed Notre Dame, ending an undefeated season yet again in the Final Four. Notre Dame would go onto win the national championship with a buzzer-beater against Mississippi State.

==== 2018–2019: Another Record Win Streak Ends ====
UConn entered the 2018–19 season with another 5-star recruiting class that included Christyn Williams, a highly decorated high-school guard and future 2-time All-Big East First Team player. However, the Huskies also lost the powerful duo of Gabby Williams and Kia Nurse to the WNBA, leaving holes in the team's roster. The team started the year with an 11–0 run, which included an 89–71 win at No. 1 Notre Dame on December 2. The Huskies were ranked #1 in the nation for the next 5 weeks until they lost their first regular-season game since the 2012–13 season at No. 8 Baylor on January 3, 2019. Baylor would go on to win the title later in the year against Notre Dame. This loss ended the Huskies 126-game winning streak in regular season games, a record in college sports (men's or women's).

UConn again finished their regular season with a record of 16–0 in AAC play to win the AAC regular season championship. Ranked #2 in the nation at the start of their conference tournament, the Huskies defeated East Carolina, South Florida, and UCF to win the AAC women's tournament title for the 6th straight year. As a result, they received the conference's automatic bid to the NCAA women's tournament. As a #2 seed, UConn easily defeated #15 seed Towson and #10 seed Buffalo to advance to the regionals. Then, they defeated #6 seed UCLA 69–61 in the Sweet Sixteen and #1 seed Louisville 80–73 in the Elite Eight to reach their 20th Final Four. In the National Semifinals, the Huskies lost in a rematch of last year's Final Four to Notre Dame, 81–76. UConn ended the season with a 35–3 overall record, their worst since 2013.

==== 2019–2020: Emerging South Carolina Rivalry ====
Despite losing two high-storing star forwards in Katie Lou Samuelson and Napheesa Collier to the WNBA, UConn began the 2019–20 season with a 12–0 run and reached #1 in the AP poll by New Year's Day. Their first loss was against No. 6 Baylor on January 9, 2020, at the XL Center. The Huskies lost twice more against No. 3 Oregon and most notably at No. 1 South Carolina 70–52 during the regular season. This was the first time that South Carolina was able to defeat UConn in a women's college basketball game, and it marked a significant turning point in the emerging rivalry between the two programs. At the conclusion of the 2019–20 regular season, UConn had a record of 26–3. They went 16–0 in the AAC and were the conference regular season champions. Then, they won the AAC tournament for the 7th year in a row, defeating Cincinnati in the title game 87–53 on March 9, 2020.

UConn received an automatic bid to the 2020 NCAA Division I women's basketball tournament, but the tournament was cancelled due to the COVID-19 pandemic. The team finished the season ranked No. 5 in the AP poll, and with a 29–3 overall record.

This was the last year that the Huskies played in the American Athletic Conference, as they left to join several of their former conference mates in the Big East Conference in July 2020. UConn dominated women's basketball during their time in the American, going undefeated in all seven of their regular seasons in AAC play and winning every conference tournament during their membership.

=== Paige Bueckers Era (2020–2025) ===
==== 2020–2021: Return to the Big East Conference ====
The Huskies entered the 2020–2021 season with extremely high hopes. They gained two ESPN five-star recruits with the addition of point guard Paige Bueckers and forward Aaliyah Edwards, as well as future 2-time Big East Defensive Player of the Year Nika Mühl. This season also marked the teams return to the Big East Conference, which they had previously left in 2013 to join the AAC. UConn was ranked #3 in both the AP and Coaches pre-season polls. During the regular season, they had a record of 21–1, including 18–0 in the Big East to easily win the conference regular season championship. The team's only loss during the regular season was a 90–87 defeat at No. 19 Arkansas on January 28, 2021. The Huskies most notable win of the season came on February 8, 2021, when they defeated No. 1 ranked South Carolina in overtime at Gampel Pavilion, 63–59. UConn easily won the Big East tournament, winning all three of their games by over 30 points.

As a #1 seed in the NCAA tournament, the Huskies won their regional title with a narrow victory over #2 seed Baylor in the Elite Eight, 69–67. This game is considered highly memorable, as UConn used a 19–0 run late in the game to knock off the Lady Bears and reach their 13th straight Final Four. However, the Huskies lost to #3 seed Arizona 69–59 in the Final Four and finished their campaign with a record of 28–2. This was the program's 4th straight tournament in which they lost in the National Semifinals. Bueckers, the team's leading scorer, won several awards at the end of the season, including the Naismith College Player of the Year award. The season was heavily affected by the COVID-19 pandemic, with numerous game cancellations and no spectators allowed at any sporting events.

==== 2021–2022: First National Title Game Loss ====
Returning from a 28–2 season with no graduations, UConn went into the 2021–22 season highly regarded, starting the season ranked #2 in the AP poll. The Huskies returned several starters: seniors Christyn Williams, Olivia Nelson-Ododa, and Evina Westbrook, plus accomplished sophomore Paige Bueckers, while adding a 2nd ranked recruiting class that included number one ranked high school recruit Azzi Fudd. Several athletes transferred during the offseason and early season, leaving the team with 12 players. Effects of the COVID-19 pandemic continued to cause game postponements and cancellations. Injuries plagued the team throughout the season; only two athletes played every game. In early December, Bueckers suffered a knee fracture which kept her sidelined until late in the season. Guards Azzi Fudd and Nika Mühl both suffered early season injuries which caused them to miss several games as well.

With Bueckers out, UConn's offense struggled against several teams, with losses against unranked Georgia Tech and no. 6 Louisville before semester break, no. 9 Oregon in January, and unranked Big East Conference opponent Villanova in February. Coach Auriemma had the team focus on defense, keeping the Huskies in games when their offense was struggling. Nine different players started, and Auriemma tried eleven different starting lineups during the season. By the time Bueckers returned to the lineup for the Big East tournament, the Huskies were dominating without her. After winning the Big East regular season championship, the team won the 2022 Big East tournament and accepted an automatic bid to the 2022 NCAA Division I tournament, where they were awarded a No. 2 seed. Everyone on the team (except for Aubrey Griffin) returned in time for the NCAA tournament. Nika Mühl, the vocal floor leader of an aggressive and effective defense, was recognized as Big East Conference defensive player of the year. First team all-conference honors went to seniors Williams and Nelson-Ododa, with Ducharme on the second team. Both Fudd and Ducharme were named to the conference's all-freshman team. Williams won the Ann Meyers Drysdale Award as the best shooting guard in the country. UConn finished the regular season with a record of 22–5 (16–1 in conference play).

In the NCAA tournament, in the Bridgeport Region, UConn beat #15 seed Mercer, #7 seed UCF, and #3 seed Indiana 75–58 in the Sweet Sixteen to advance to their 16th straight regional final. In the Elite Eight, the Huskies defeated #1 seed NC State 91–87 in double overtime to reach the Final Four for a record 14th consecutive year. This game is considered to be one of the most memorable in the team's history and was immediately dubbed an "instant classic" in women's March Madness. In the National Semifinals, UConn beat long-time rival and defending national champions Stanford 63–58 to reach the national championship game for the first time since 2016. However, they ultimately lost to the #1 overall seed South Carolina, 64–49. This was the program's first ever loss in a national title game, and it caused UConn to finish with a 30–6 overall record, their worst since 1993.

==== 2022–2023: Final Four Record Streak Ends ====
UConn entered the 2022–23 season with six returning starters, including the backcourt of Paige Bueckers, Azzi Fudd, and Nika Mühl, as well as forwards Dorka Juhász, Aaliyah Edwards, and Caroline Ducharme. With this line-up, UConn was expected to win the much-improved Big East again and be highly competitive in the NCAA tournament. However, the team became plagued by injuries before the season even began. Bueckers tore an ACL in a pickup game before fall workouts, and five-star recruit Ice Brady suffered a tendon dislocation during an early practice; both players underwent season ending surgeries and sat on the bench all season.

Starting the season already down two players, UConn played surprisingly well against early opponents, with strong wins against #3 Texas, #10 NC State, and #9 Iowa in the first weeks. In the Texas game, Dorka Juhász injured a thumb and was sidelined for several weeks. Aubrey Griffin, who had redshirted the previous season because of injury, and Lou Lopez Sénéchal, a graduate transfer shooting guard from Fairfield University, got some starts and immediately impacted the team with their durability and shooting proficiency. Fudd began the season as a leading scorer, with Mühl leading the country in assists per game, and Edwards seemingly unstoppable in the paint. Fudd was injured in the loss to #7 Notre Dame, and by the end of December the Huskies only had seven players healthy, even after Juhász's return.

Even with a short bench, the Huskies continued to win January, dominating most conference opponents and picking up another quality win at Tennessee, the only team to score more than 60 points against the fierce UConn team defense in January. In early February, UConn matched up against the #1 ranked South Carolina Gamecocks with a sold-out home crowd in the XL Center, but ultimately lost 81–77. Three days later, unranked Marquette upset the noticeably worn-out Huskies in a tight defensive battle, UConn's first consecutive loss in 30 years.

UConn finished their regular season with an overall record of 26–5 and a conference record of 18–2. They won the Big East regular season championship and were the top seed in the conference tournament. Azzi Fudd and Caroline Ducharme, who both missed a significant part of the regular season due to injury, returned in time for the Big East tournament, and with the UConn squad healthy for the first time since its first games, the Huskies methodically notched three consecutive wins to emerge as tournament champions, getting the automatic bid to the 2023 NCAA women's basketball tournament. In the NCAA tournament, UConn was awarded a #2 seed and advanced to their 29th consecutive Sweet Sixteen with wins over #15 seed Vermont and #7 seed Baylor. However, they lost to #3 seed Ohio State in the regional semifinals, 73–61. This was the first time that the Huskies failed to make the Final Four since 2007, and was also the first time they had failed to reach the Elite Eight since 2005. UConn finished their season with a 31–6 record.

==== 2023–2024: Unexpected Return to the Final Four ====
After gaining a high school recruiting class ranked #4 in the nation, UConn entered the 2023–24 season ranked #2 in both the AP and Coaches pre-season polls. However, they lost three early non-conference games and several key players to injury by late November, including starters Azzi Fudd and Caroline Ducharme. For most of the season, UConn ran out a starting lineup of forward Aliyah Edwards, guards Paige Bueckers and Nika Mühl, and freshmen guards KK Arnold and Ashlynn Shade. Freshmen forward Ice Brady and guard Qadence Samuels were the primary substitutes on a very short bench. With Bueckers leading the team in points, Edwards leading in rebounds, and Mühl leading in assists, UConn went 18–0 in the Big East to win the conference regular season title. They never dropped out of the top 25 in the AP and Coaches poll, and had an overall record of 26–5 going into the postseason. The teams losses included three early season defeats against NC State, No. 10 Texas, and No. 2 UCLA, as well as two later season losses to No. 15 Notre Dame and at No. 1 South Carolina. Bueckers was named the Big East Player of the Year at the end of the regular season.

UConn entered the Big East tournament in March on a six-game winning streak. Freshmen guard Amari DeBerry was ruled out for the rest of the season after going into concussion protocol, and in the quarterfinals, Edwards suffered a broken nose. This left the Huskies with just seven players available for the rest of the Big East tournament. UConn went on to win the tournament and hence clinched a berth in the NCAA tournament. It was their 11th straight conference tournament championship. Bueckers and Edwards were both named to All-American teams.

UConn was awarded a #3 seed in the Portland 3 regional of the 2024 NCAA tournament. With Edwards back in time for the tournament, the Huskies defeated #14 seed Jackson State and #6 seed Syracuse in the first two rounds, #7 seed Duke 53–45 in the Sweet 16, and #1 seed USC 80–73 in the Elite Eight to advance to their 23rd Final Four. Geno Auriemma described this Final Four appearance as the team's most surprising run since their first Final Four appearance in 1991. The team then narrowly lost to #1 seed Iowa in the National Semifinals, 71–69. UConn finished the season with an overall record of 33–6 and were ranked #3 in the final AP and Coaches polls. Afterward, Edwards and Mühl were selected in the 2024 WNBA draft. Mühl finished her UConn career as the program's all-time assists leader.

==== 2025 National Championship ====
UConn entered the 2024–25 season ranked #2 in the AP and Coaches polls, returning two-time All-American Paige Bueckers and several other players previously redshirted for injury, with some still unavailable at the season's start. The Huskies added a solid recruiting class that included #1 ranked recruit Sarah Strong. They also picked up Princeton graduate Kaitlyn Chen from the transfer portal.

An early season win against Fairleigh Dickinson was Geno Auriemma's 1217th career victory, making him the winningest head coach in NCAA history. UConn's main starting lineup was set when guard Azzi Fudd returned from a year-long injury hiatus, joining guards Bueckers and Chen, forward Strong, and center Jana El-Alfy. Guards Ashlynn Shade and KK Arnold and forward Ice Brady were the primary contributors off the bench. The Huskies started the season well, winning non-conference games against three ranked opponents: North Carolina, Ole Miss, and Louisville. However, in December, they lost non-conference games to No. 8 ranked Notre Dame and No. 7 USC.

UConn had an 11-game winning streak from late December to early February until they lost at No. 19 ranked non-conference opponent Tennessee 80–76 on February 6, 2025. Ten days later, UConn defeated the #4 team in the country in defending national champion South Carolina 87–58 at the Gamecocks home court, which caused them to rise to No. 3 in the AP and Coaches Polls. This win was the Huskies first victory over the Gamecocks since 2021 and also snapped South Carolina's 71-game home winning streak. The Huskies finished their regular season with a record of 28–3 and easily won the Big East regular season title, going undefeated in conference play for the second consecutive season. UConn then won the Big East tournament with a 70–50 win over No. 22 ranked Creighton in the Big East title game. Bueckers and Strong were both named to All-American teams. The media started referring to Bueckers, Strong, and Fudd as UConn's "big three" that was expected to lead the team to a deep run in the NCAA tournament.

Going into the tournament, UConn was ranked #3 in both polls but was a #2 seed in the Spokane regional. They defeated #15 seed Arkansas State and #10 seed South Dakota State in the first two rounds to advance to their 31st consecutive Sweet Sixteen. UConn then defeated #3 seed Oklahoma 82–59 in the Sweet Sixteen and won a rematch with #1 seed USC 78–64 in the Elite Eight to advance to their 24th Final Four. Bueckers, who had already declared for the 2025 WNBA draft, scored over 30 points in three straight games, including a career-high 40 against Oklahoma. In the National semifinals, UConn defeated the #1 overall seed UCLA 85–51 to advance to their first national championship game since 2022, a rematch against South Carolina. The Huskies ultimately found their revenge with an 82–59 blowout of the Gamecocks to win their record 12th national title. Azzi Fudd was named the tournament's most outstanding player. This was the program's first title since 2016, and the Huskies won it with an average margin of victory of 32.8 points per tournament game.

UConn finished their season with a 37–3 record, ending with a 16-game winning streak. All 37 of their victories were by double digit margins. Sarah Strong led the team in rebounds during the season. Bueckers led the team in points and assists, and she finished her UConn career with the third-most points in program history.

== Head coaches ==
=== Sandra Hamm (1974–1975) ===
Sandra Hamm, a Terryville native, was employed part-time as the interim women's coach in the 1974–75 season, when the team was 2–8. When she wasn't coaching, she taught physical education at a junior high school in Manchester.

=== Wanda Flora (1975–1980) ===
After graduating from college in California, Wanda Flora went to graduate school at Indiana University, where she was an assistant coach for the women's basketball team and coached the junior varsity team. After a brief stint at a small college in Pennsylvania, she applied for the job at UConn, starting in 1975 and leading the team to a 38–66 record in five seasons. During her tenure, shooting guard Karen Mullins was the first UConn woman to receive a basketball scholarship; that number had increased to 12 by 1980.

=== Jean Balthaser (1980–1985) ===
In 1980 the university hired Jean Balthaser, who had coached at the University of Pittsburgh. Ms. Balthaser continued to expand the program, leading UConn to its first winning season in her first year as coach, and finishing with a 52–88 record over five seasons.

=== Geno Auriemma (1985–present) ===
In his 40 years as head coach of the University of Connecticut women's basketball team, Luigi "Geno" Auriemma has become very well known with the program. Inheriting a program that had only had one winning season in its entire history, Auriemma has overseen one of the largest turn arounds in college sports history. Under his watch, UConn has become the team that wins most often in women's college basketball. Auriemma has won more than 25 different national Coach of the Year awards, and was inducted into both the Naismith Memorial Basketball Hall of Fame, and the Women's Basketball Hall of Fame. He was head coach of the United States women's national basketball team from 2009, until stepping down from that role after the 2016 Summer Olympics. During his tenure with Team USA, they won the 2010 and 2014 World Cups, plus Olympic gold medals in 2012 and 2016.

== Year by year results ==
Season	Coach	Overall	Conference	Standing	Postseason
Sandra Hamm (Yankee Conference) (1974–1975)
1974–75	Sandra Hamm	2–8			
Sandra Hamm:		2–8 (.200)			
Wanda Flora (Yankee Conference) (1975–1980)
1975–76	Wanda Flora	7–12			
1976–77	Wanda Flora	7–13			
1977–78	Wanda Flora	7–13			
1978–79	Wanda Flora	8–13			
1979–80	Wanda Flora	9–15			
Wanda Flora:		38–66 (.365)			
Jean Balthaser (Yankee Conference) (1980–1982)
1980–81	Jean Balthaser	16–14			
1981–82	Jean Balthaser	9–18			
Jean Balthaser (Big East Conference) (1982–1985)
1982–83	Jean Balthaser	9–18	1–7	9th	
1983–84	Jean Balthaser	9–20	0–8	9th	
1984–85	Jean Balthaser	9–18	3–13	8th	
Jean Balthaser:		52–88 (.371)	4–28 (.125)		
Geno Auriemma (Big East Conference) (1985–2013)
1985–86	Geno Auriemma	12–15	4–12	7th	
1986–87	Geno Auriemma	14–13	9–7	7th	
1987–88	Geno Auriemma	17–11	9–7	5th	
1988–89	Geno Auriemma	24–6	13–2	1st	NCAA 1st Round
1989–90	Geno Auriemma	25–6	14–2	T–1st	NCAA 2nd Round
1990–91	Geno Auriemma	29–5	14–2	1st	NCAA Final Four
1991–92	Geno Auriemma	23–11	13–5	T–2nd	NCAA 2nd Round
1992–93	Geno Auriemma	18–11	12–6	3rd	NCAA 1st Round
1993–94	Geno Auriemma	30–3	17–1	1st	NCAA Elite Eight
1994–95	Geno Auriemma	35–0	18–0	1st	NCAA Champions
1995–96	Geno Auriemma	34–4	17–1	1st	NCAA Final Four
1996–97	Geno Auriemma	33–1	18–0	1st	NCAA Elite Eight
1997–98	Geno Auriemma	34–3	17–1	1st	NCAA Elite Eight
1998–99	Geno Auriemma	29–5	17–1	T–1st	NCAA Sweet Sixteen
1999–2000	Geno Auriemma	36–1	16–0	1st	NCAA Champions
2000–01	Geno Auriemma	32–3	15–1	T–1st	NCAA Final Four
2001–02	Geno Auriemma	39–0	16–0	1st	NCAA Champions
2002–03	Geno Auriemma	37–1	16–0	1st	NCAA Champions
2003–04	Geno Auriemma	31–4	14–2	1st	NCAA Champions
2004–05	Geno Auriemma	25–8	13–3	T–2nd	NCAA Sweet Sixteen
2005–06	Geno Auriemma	32–5	14–2	2nd	NCAA Elite Eight
2006–07	Geno Auriemma	32–4	16–0	1st	NCAA Elite Eight
2007–08	Geno Auriemma	36–2	15–1	1st	NCAA Final Four
2008–09	Geno Auriemma	39–0	16–0	1st	NCAA Champions
2009–10	Geno Auriemma	39–0	16–0	1st	NCAA Champions
2010–11	Geno Auriemma	36–2	16–0	1st	NCAA Final Four
2011–12	Geno Auriemma	33–5	13–3	3rd	NCAA Final Four
2012–13	Geno Auriemma	35–4	14–2	2nd	NCAA Champions
Geno Auriemma (American Athletic Conference) (2013–2020)
2013–14	Geno Auriemma	40–0	18–0	1st	NCAA Champions
2014–15	Geno Auriemma	38–1	18–0	1st	NCAA Champions
2015–16	Geno Auriemma	38–0	18–0	1st	NCAA Champions
2016–17	Geno Auriemma	36–1	16–0	1st	NCAA Final Four
2017–18	Geno Auriemma	36–1	16–0	1st	NCAA Final Four
2018–19	Geno Auriemma	35–3	16–0	1st	NCAA Final Four
2019–20	Geno Auriemma	29–3	16–0	1st	tournament cancelled
Geno Auriemma (Big East Conference) (2020–present)
2020–21	Geno Auriemma	28–2	18–0	1st	NCAA Final Four
2021–22	Geno Auriemma	30–6	16–1	1st	NCAA Runner-up
2022–23	Geno Auriemma	31–6	14–2	1st	NCAA Sweet Sixteen
2023–24	Geno Auriemma	33–6	18–0	1st	NCAA Final Four
2024–25	Geno Auriemma	37–3	18–0	1st	NCAA Champions
2025–26	Geno Auriemma	38–1	20–0	1st	NCAA Final Four
2026–27	Geno Auriemma	1–1	0–0		
Geno Auriemma:		1,260–166 (.884)	611–63 (.907)		
Total:		1,352–328 (.805)			
National champion Postseason invitational champion Conference regular season champion Conference regular season and conference tournament champion Division regular season champion Division regular season and conference tournament champion Conference tournament champion

=== Conference tournament ===
UConn played in the Big East Conference from the 1982–83 season, the first in which the league sponsored women's basketball and held a tournament, until the conference split in 2013. The Huskies won 18 tournaments in 31 years. From 2013–14 to 2019–20, UConn played in the American Athletic Conference, where they went unbeaten both in regular season and conference tournament games, with a perfect 139–0 record and 7 conference tournaments. In 2020–21, UConn rejoined several of its former conference mates in the current Big East Conference.

Extended content

Keys

- – won match
- – lost match

Year	Seed	First Round	Quarterfinal	Semifinal	Final
Big East Conference
1983	#9	#8 Boston College; 57–69			
1984	#9	#7 Boston College; 52–51	#1 Pittsburgh; 57–60		
1985	#7	#9 Seton Hall; 73–87 ^{OT}			
1986	#7		#2 Villanova; 47–68		
1987	#4		#4 St. John's; 58–68		
1988	#5		#3 Boston College; 56–71		
1989	#1		#8 Georgetown; 85–73	#4 Boston College; 65–45	#3 Providence; 84–65
1990	#1		#8 St. John's; 71–58	#4 Boston College; 72–51	#2 Providence; 61–82
1991	#1		#8 Villanova; 64–47	#5 Seton Hall; 69–54	#2 Providence; 79–74
1992	#2		#7 Pittsburgh; 86–50	#3 Georgetown; 82–64	#1 Miami; 47–56
1993	#3		#6 Seton Hall; 56–54 ^{OT}	#7 Providence; 73–87	
1994	#1		#9 St. John's; 69–45	#4 Providence; 92–56	#2 Seton Hall; 77–51
1995	#1		#9 Providence; 92–63	#4 Pittsburgh; 95–63	#3 Seton Hall; 85–49
1996	#1		#8 Rutgers; 93–64	#13 Pittsburgh; 83–51	#3 Notre Dame; 71–54
1997	#1		#9 Villanova; 63–45	#4 Miami; 98–71	#3 Notre Dame; 86–77
1998	#1		#8 West Virginia; 84–82	#5 Notre Dame; 73–53	#2 Rutgers; 67–58
1999	#1		#8 St. John's; 82–58	#5 Georgetown; 77–42	#3 Notre Dame; 96–75
2000	#1		#9 St. John's; 85–41	#4 Boston College; 79–54	#3 Rutgers; 79–59
2001	#2		#7 Boston College; 96–53	#3 Rutgers; 94–66	#1 Notre Dame; 78–76
2002	#1		#9 Seton Hall; 78–48	#4 Villanova; 83–39	#3 Boston College; 96–54
2003	#1		#8 Seton Hall; 70–47	#5 Virginia Tech; 71–54	#3 Villanova; 48–52
2004	#1		#8 Virginia Tech; 48–34	#5 Boston College; 70–73	
2005	#3		#11 Syracuse; 82–56	#2 Notre Dame; 67–54	#1 Rutgers; 67–51
2006	#2		#10 Notre Dame; 71–60	#3 DePaul; 69–57	#12 West Virginia; 50–44
2007	#1		#8 South Florida; 74–54	#5 Louisville; 76–50	#2 Rutgers; 47–55
2008	#1		#9 DePaul; 86–67	#5 Pittsburgh; 74–47	#7 Louisville; 65–59
2009	#1		#8 South Florida; 79–42	#4 Villanova; 72–42	#2 Louisville; 75–36
2010	#1		#9 Syracuse; 77–41	#5 Notre Dame; 59–44	#2 West Virginia; 60–32
2011	#1		#8 Georgetown; 54–43	#4 Rutgers; 75–51	#3 Notre Dame; 73–64
2012	#3		#6 Rutgers; 49–34	#2 St. John's; 74–43	#1 Notre Dame; 63–54
2013	#3		#7 DePaul; 91–61	#3 Syracuse; 64–51	#2 Notre Dame; 59–61
American Athletic Conference
2014	#1		#8 Cincinnati; 72–42	#4 Rutgers; 83–57	#2 Louisville; 72–52
2015	#1		#9 Cincinnati; 93–34	#5 East Carolina; 106–56	#2 South Florida; 84–70
2016	#1		#8 East Carolina; 92–51	#5 Tulane; 82–35	#2 South Florida; 77–51
2017	#1		#9 Tulsa; 105–57	#4 UCF; 78–56	#3 South Florida; 100–44
2018	#1		#9 Tulane; 82–56	#4 Cincinnati; 75–21	#2 South Florida; 70–54
2019	#1		#8 East Carolina; 92–65	#5 South Florida; 81–45	#2 Central Florida; 66–45
2020	#1		#8 Temple; 94–61	#4 South Florida; 79–38	#3 Cincinnati; 87–53
Big East Conference
2021	#1		#8 St. John's; 77–41	#5 Villanova; 84–39	#2 Marquette; 73–39
2022	#1		#9 Georgetown; 84–38	#5 Marquette; 71–51	#2 Villanova; 70–40
2023	#1		#9 Georgetown; 69–39	#5 Marquette; 81–52	#2 Villanova; 67–56
2024	#1		#9 Providence; 86–53	#4 Marquette; 58–29	#6 Georgetown; 78–42
2025	#1		#8 St. John's; 71–40	#5 Villanova; 82–54	#2 Creighton; 70–50

=== Postseason ===
The Huskies have appeared in the NCAA tournament 36 times, every year since their first appearance in 1989. Their combined record is 146–25 (.854); they have been to 25 Final Fours and are 12-time National Champions (1995, 2000, 2002, 2003, 2004, 2009, 2010, 2013, 2014, 2015, 2016, 2025).

Extended content

Year	Seed	Round	Opponent	Result
1989	8	First Round	(9) La Salle	L 63–72
1990	4	Second Round	(5) Clemson	L 59–61
1991	3	Second Round; Sweet Sixteen; Elite Eight; Final Four	(11) Toledo (2) NC State (4) Clemson (1) Virginia	W 81–80; W 82–71; W 60–57; L 55–61
1992	6	First Round; Second Round	(11) St. Peter's (3) Vanderbilt	W 83–66; L 47–75
1993	6	First Round	(11) Louisville	L 71–74
1994	1	First Round; Second Round; Sweet Sixteen; Elite Eight	(16) Brown (9) Auburn (4) Southern Miss (3) North Carolina	W 79–60; W 81–59; W 78–64; L 69–81
1995	1	First Round; Second Round; Sweet Sixteen; Elite Eight; Final Four; Championship	(16) Maine (8) Virginia Tech (4) Alabama (3) Virginia (2) Stanford (1) Tennessee	W 105–75; W 91–45; W 87–56; W 67–63; W 87–60; W 70–64
1996	1	First Round; Second Round; Sweet Sixteen; Elite Eight; Final Four	(16) Howard (9) Michigan State (12) San Francisco (3) Vanderbilt (1) Tennessee	W 94–63; W 88–68; W 72–44; W 67–57; L 83–88 ^{OT}
1997	1	First Round; Second Round; Sweet Sixteen; Elite Eight	(16) Lehigh (9) Iowa (4) Illinois (3) Tennessee	W 103–35; W 72–53; W 78–73; L 81–91
1998	2	First Round; Second Round; Sweet Sixteen; Elite Eight	(15) Fairfield (10) George Washington (3) Arizona (4) N.C. State	W 93–52; W 75–67; W 74–57; L 52–60
1999	1	First Round; Second Round; Sweet Sixteen	(16) St. Francis (PA (8) Xavier (4) Iowa State	W 97–46; W 86–84; L 58–64
2000	1	First Round; Second Round; Sweet Sixteen; Elite Eight; Final Four; Championship	#16 Hampton #9 Clemson #5 Oklahoma #3 LSU #2 Penn State #1 Tennessee	W 116–45; W 83–45; W 102–80; W 86–71; W 89–67; W 71–52
2001	1	First Round; Second Round; Sweet Sixteen; Elite Eight; Final Four	#16 Long Island #9 Colorado State #4 NC State #3 Louisiana Tech #1 Notre Dame	W 101–29; W 89–44; W 72–58; W 67–48; L 75–90
2002	1	First Round; Second Round; Sweet Sixteen; Elite Eight; Final Four; Championship	#16 St. Francis (PA) #9 Iowa #4 Penn State #7 Old Dominion #2 Tennessee #1 Oklahoma	W 86–37; W 86–48; W 82–64; W 85–64; W 79–56; W 82–70
2003	1	First Round; Second Round; Sweet Sixteen; Elite Eight; Final Four; Championship	#16 Boston University #9 TCU #5 Boston College #2 Purdue #2 Texas #1 Tennessee	W 91–44; W 81–66; W 70–49; W 73–64; W 71–69; W 73–68
2004	2	First Round; Second Round; Sweet Sixteen; Elite Eight; Final Four; Championship	#15 Pennsylvania #7 Auburn #11 UC Santa Barbara #1 Penn State #7 Minnesota #1 Tennessee	W 91–55; W 79–53; W 63–55; W 66–49; W 67–58; W 70–61
2005	3	First Round; Second Round; Sweet Sixteen	#14 Dartmouth #6 Florida State #2 Stanford	W 95–47; W 70–52; L 59–76
2006	2	First Round; Second Round; Sweet Sixteen; Elite Eight	#15 Coppin State #7 Virginia Tech #3 Georgia #1 Duke	W 77–54; W 79–56; W 77–75; L 61–63 ^{OT}
2007	1	First Round; Second Round; Sweet Sixteen; Elite Eight	#16 UMBC #9 Wisconsin–Green Bay #4 NC State #3 LSU	W 82–33; W 94–70; W 78–71; L 50–73
2008	1	First Round; Second Round; Sweet Sixteen; Elite Eight; Final Four	#16 Cornell #8 Texas #5 Old Dominion #2 Rutgers #2 Stanford	W 89–47; W 89–55; W 78–63; W 66–56; L 73–82
2009	1	First Round; Second Round; Sweet Sixteen; Elite Eight; Final Four; Championship	(16) Vermont (8) Florida (4) California (6) Arizona State (2) Stanford (3) Louisville	W 104–65; W 87–59; W 77–53; W 83–64; W 83–64; W 76–54
2010	1	First Round; Second Round; Sweet Sixteen; Elite Eight; Final Four; Championship	(16) Southern (LA) (8) Temple (4) Iowa State (3) Florida State (4) Baylor (1) Stanford	W 95–39; W 90–36; W 74–36; W 90–50; W 70–50; W 53–47
2011	1	First Round; Second Round; Sweet Sixteen; Elite Eight; Final Four	(16) Hartford (9) Purdue (5) Georgetown (2) Duke (2) Notre Dame	W 75–39; W 64–40; W 68–63; W 75–40; L 63–72
2012	1	First Round; Second Round; Sweet Sixteen; Elite Eight; Final Four	(16) Prairie View A&M (8) Kansas State (4) Penn State (2) Kentucky (1) Notre Dame	W 83–47; W 72–26; W 77–59; W 80–65; L 75–83 ^{OT}
2013	1	First Round; Second Round; Sweet Sixteen; Elite Eight; Final Four; Championship	(16) Idaho (8) Vanderbilt (4) Maryland (2) Kentucky (1) Notre Dame (5) Louisville	W 105–37; W 77–44; W 76–50; W 83–53; W 83–65; W 93–60
2014	1	First Round; Second Round; Sweet Sixteen; Elite Eight; Final Four; Championship	(16) Prairie View A&M (9) Saint Joseph's (12) BYU (3) Texas A&M (2) Stanford (1) Notre Dame	W 87–44; W 91–52; W 70–51; W 69–54; W 75–56; W 79–58
2015	1	First Round; Second Round; Sweet Sixteen; Elite Eight; Final Four; Championship	(16) St. Francis Brooklyn (8) Rutgers (5) Texas (7) Dayton (1) Maryland (1) Notre Dame	W 89–33; W 91–55; W 105–54; W 91–70; W 81–58; W 63–53
2016	1	First Round; Second Round; Sweet Sixteen; Elite Eight; Final Four; Championship	(16) Robert Morris (9) Duquesne (5) Mississippi State (2) Texas (2) Oregon State (4) Syracuse	W 101–49; W 91–57; W 98–38; W 86–65; W 80–51; W 82–51
2017	1	First Round; Second Round; Sweet Sixteen; Elite Eight; Final Four	(16) Albany (8) Syracuse (4) UCLA (10) Oregon (2) Mississippi State	W 116–55; W 94–64; W 86–71; W 90–52; L 64–66 ^{OT}
2018	1	First Round; Second Round; Sweet Sixteen; Elite Eight; Final Four	(16) St. Francis (9) Quinnipiac (5) Duke (2) South Carolina (1) Notre Dame	W 140–52; W 71–46; W 72–59; W 94–65; L 89–91 ^{OT}
2019	2	First Round; Second Round; Sweet Sixteen; Elite Eight; Final Four	(15) Towson (10) Buffalo (6) UCLA (1) Louisville (1) Notre Dame	W 110–61; W 84–72; W 69–61; W 80–73; L 76–81
2021	1	First Round; Second Round; Sweet Sixteen; Elite Eight; Final Four	(16) High Point (8) Syracuse (5) Iowa (2) Baylor (3) Arizona	W 102–59; W 83–47; W 92–72; W 69–67; L 59–69
2022	2	First Round; Second Round; Sweet Sixteen; Elite Eight; Final Four; Championship	(15) Mercer (7) UCF (3) Indiana (1) N.C. State (1) Stanford (1) South Carolina	W 83–38; W 52–47; W 75–58; W 91–87 ^{2OT} W 63–58; L 49–64
2023	2	First Round; Second Round; Sweet Sixteen	(15) Vermont (7) Baylor (3) Ohio State	W 95–52; W 77–58; L 61–73
2024	3	First Round; Second Round; Sweet Sixteen; Elite Eight; Final Four	(14) Jackson State (6) Syracuse (7) Duke (1) USC (1) Iowa	W 86–64; W 72–64; W 53–45; W 80–73; L 69–71
2025	2	First Round; Second Round; Sweet Sixteen; Elite Eight; Final Four; Championship	(15) Arkansas State (10) South Dakota State (3) Oklahoma (1) USC (1) UCLA (1) South Carolina	W 103–34; W 91–57; W 82–59; W 78–64; W 85–51; W 82–59
2026	1	First Round; Second Round; Sweet Sixteen; Elite Eight; Final Four	(16) UTSA (9) Syracuse (4) North Carolina (6) Notre Dame; South Carolina	W 90–52; W 98–45; W 63–42; W 70–52; L 48–62

The following lists where the Huskies have been seeded in the NCAA tournament.

Years →	'89	'90	'91	'92	'93	'94	'95	'96	'97	'98	'99	'00	'01	'02	'03	'04	'05	'06	'07	'08	'09	'10	'11	'12	'13	'14	'15	'16	'17	'18	'19	'21	'22	'23	'24	'25	'26
Seeds →	8	4	3	6	6	1	1	1	1	2	1	1	1	1	1	2	3	2	1	1	1	1	1	1	1	1	1	1	1	1	2	1	2	2	3	2	1

== Notable players ==
=== Individual achievements ===
UConn has featured a great number of star players, All-Americans, Hall of Famers and recipients of individual trophies. The following table shows the UConn players recipients of the major individual awards in women's college basketball.

Player	Honda Sports Award (since 1977)	Wade Trophy (since 1978)	Naismith Player of the Year (since 1983)	USBWA Player of the Year (since 1988)	AP College Player of the Year (since 1995)	Wooden Award (since 2004)
Rebecca Lobo	1995	1995	1995	1995	1995	
Jennifer Rizzotti	1996	1996			1996	
Kara Wolters					1997	
Shea Ralph	2000					
Sue Bird	2002	2002	2002	2002	2002	
Diana Taurasi	2003; 2004	2003	2003; 2004	2003	2003	
Renee Montgomery	2009					
Tina Charles			2010	2010	2010	2010
Maya Moore	2010; 2011	2009; 2010; 2011	2009; 2011	2009; 2011	2009; 2011	2009; 2011
Breanna Stewart	2014; 2015; 2016	2015; 2016	2014; 2015; 2016	2014; 2015; 2016	2014; 2015; 2016	2015; 2016
Paige Bueckers	2025	2025	2021	2021	2021	2021
Sarah Strong		2026	2026	2026	2026	

After the end of the NCAA tournament, the Associated Press selects a Most Outstanding Player. Eight UConn players have received this award since its induction in 1982: Rebecca Lobo (1995), Shea Ralph (2000), Swin Cash (2002), Diana Taurasi (2003 and 2004), Tina Charles (2009), Maya Moore (2010), Breanna Stewart (2013, 2014, 2015, 2016), and Azzi Fudd (2025).

=== School records ===
Statistics correct through April 6, 2025.

Players active in 2024–2025 are in bold.

2000-plus points during UConn career
Rk	Player	Points	Seasons
1	Maya Moore	3,036	2007–08 2008–09 2009–10 2010–11
2	Breanna Stewart	2,676	2012–13 2013–14 2014–15 2015–16
3	Paige Bueckers	2,439	2020–21 2021–22 2023–24 2024–25
4	Napheesa Collier	2,401	2015–16 2016–17 2017–18 2018–19
5	Tina Charles	2,346	2006–07 2007–08 2008–09 2009–10
6	Katie Lou Samuelson	2,342	2015–16 2016–17 2017–18 2018–19
7	Nykesha Sales	2,178	1994–95 1995–96 1996–97 1997–98
	Kaleena Mosqueda-Lewis	2,178	2011–12 2012–13 2013–14 2014–15
9	Kerry Bascom	2,177	1987–88 1988–89 1989–90 1990–91
10	Diana Taurasi	2,156	2000–01 2001–02 2002–03 2003–04
11	Kara Wolters	2,141	1993–94 1994–95 1995–96 1996–97
12	Rebecca Lobo	2,133	1991–92 1992–93 1993–94 1994–95

=== Huskies of Honor ===
The Huskies of Honor is a program recognizing the most significant figures in UConn history, with plaques in Gampel Pavilion commemorating the inductees.

The women's basketball players list includes guards Sue Bird, Paige Bueckers, Bria Hartley, Moriah Jefferson, Renee Montgomery, Shea Ralph, Jennifer Rizzotti, Nykesha Sales, Diana Taurasi, and Azzi Fudd; forwards Svetlana Abrosimova, Swin Cash, Napheesa Collier, Aaliyah Edwards, Maya Moore, Kaleena Mosqueda-Lewis, Katie Lou Samuelson, Breanna Stewart, Morgan Tuck, and Gabby Williams; centers Kerry Bascom, Tina Charles, Stefanie Dolson, Rebecca Lobo, and Kara Wolters.

=== Retired numbers ===
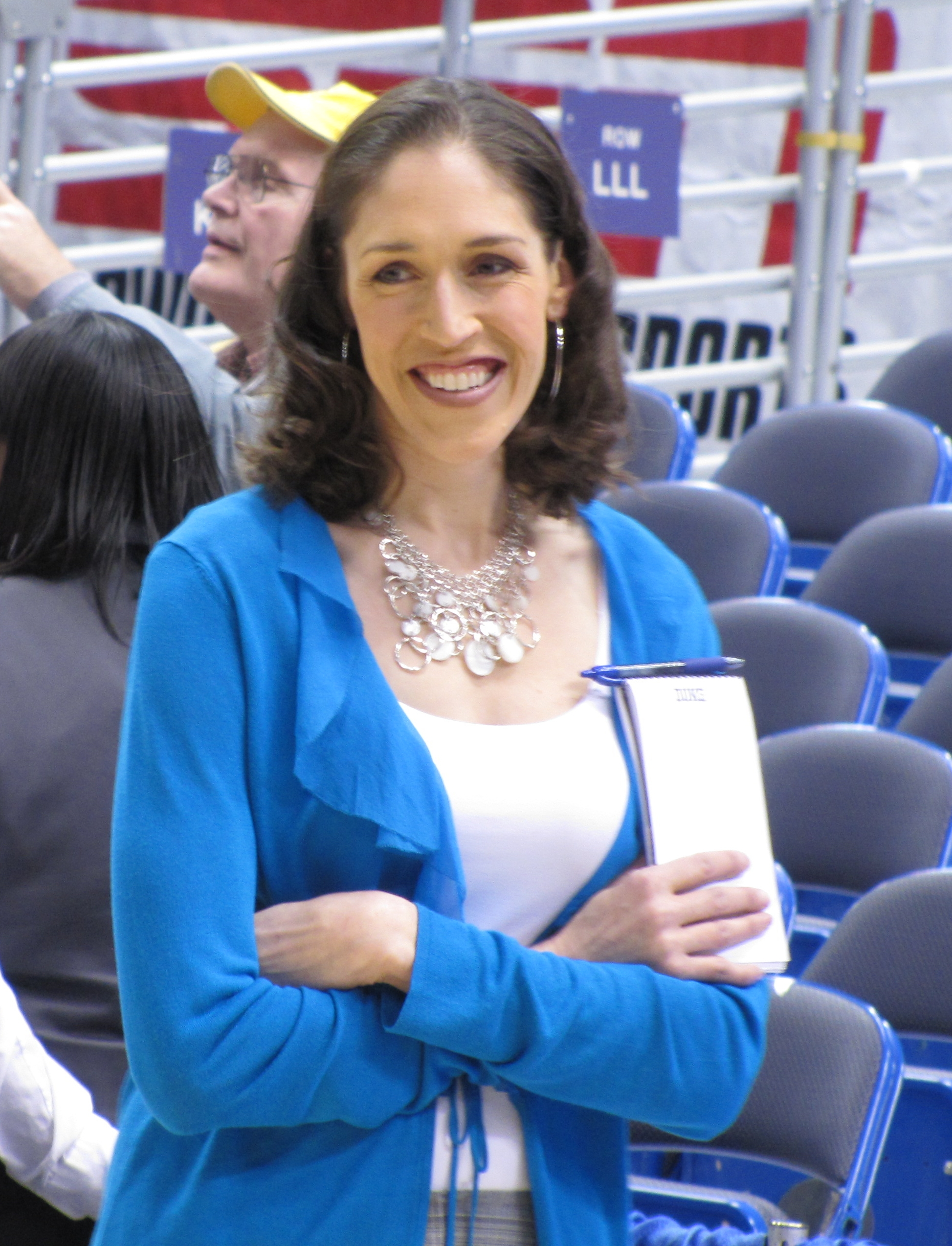
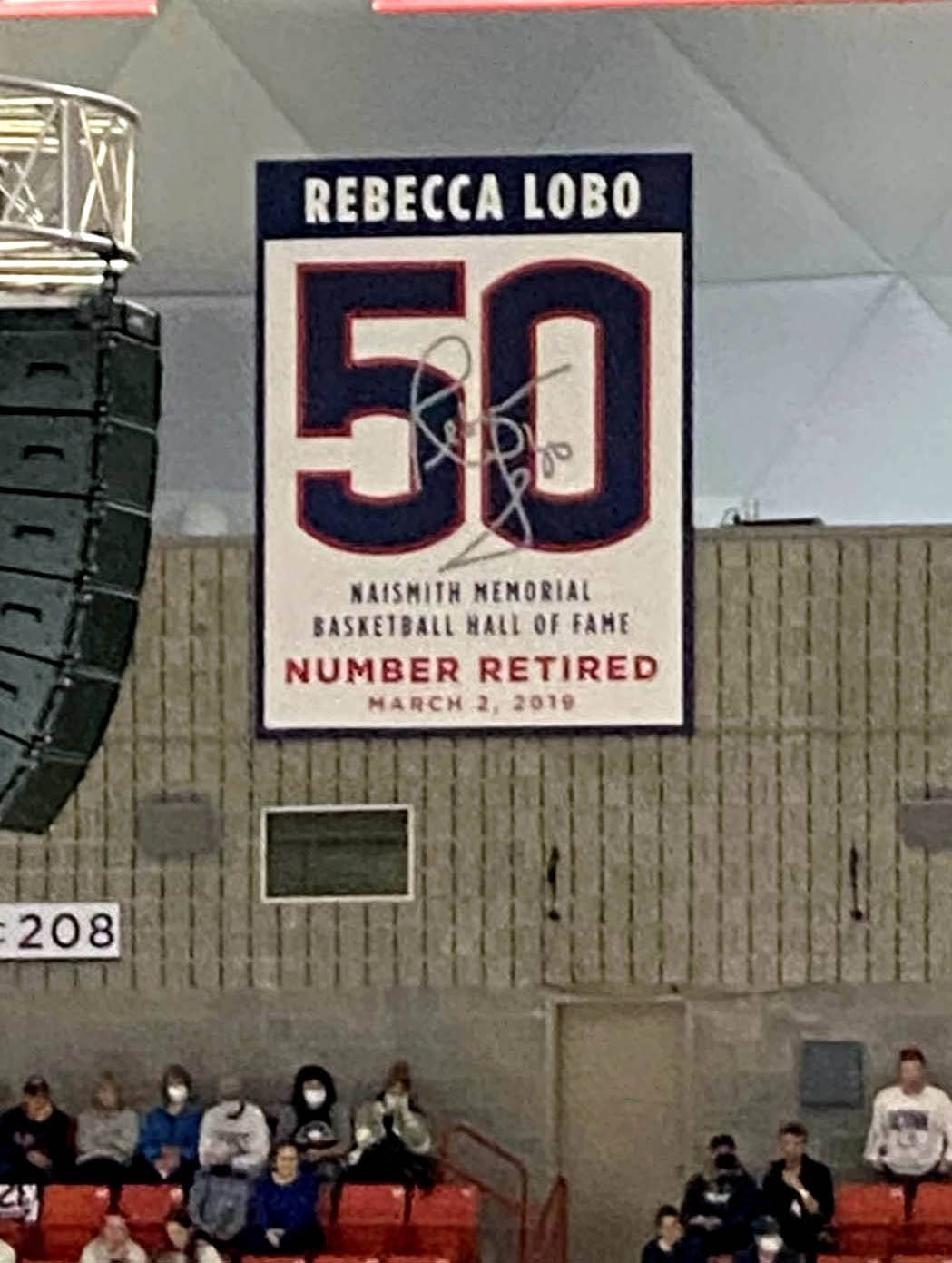
Rebecca Lobo (left) is the only player to have her number retired (right, the #50 worn by Lobo at UConn in 2022)

On December 7, 2018, UConn announced that the #50 worn by Rebecca Lobo would be permanently retired, effective with ceremonies to be held during the Huskies' final 2018–19 home game on March 2, 2019. In its announcement, UConn stated that going forward, number retirement would be reserved for former Huskies players inducted into the Naismith Memorial Basketball Hall of Fame, as Lobo was in 2017. At the same time, the Huskies announced that the #34 worn by Ray Allen, a 2018 Naismith Hall inductee, would be retired by UConn men's basketball, with ceremonies held during the season's final men's home game on March 3, 2019.

UConn's announcement did not make it clear whether both numbers would be retired across both men's and women's programs, but a university spokesperson clarified that the retirements applied only to the teams that Lobo and Allen competed for, meaning that #50 remains available in men's basketball and #34 in women's. Additionally, on November 14, 2022, UConn retired the #32 worn by Swin Cash, as she was a 2022 Naismith Hall inductee, with ceremonies held during the women's team game against Texas.

UConn retired Sue Bird's #10 in December 2025.

=== WNBA success ===
Twenty-two UConn players have been selected in the first round of WNBA drafts. Seven of them have been first overall picks: Sue Bird (2002), Diana Taurasi (2004), Tina Charles (2010), Maya Moore (2011), Breanna Stewart (2016), Paige Bueckers (2025), and Azzi Fudd (2026). Rebecca Lobo was part of the 1997 inaugural draft, with the top players allocated to founding teams without any particular order; similarly Nykesha Sales was part of the 1998 WNBA expansion players allocation.

In the 2002 WNBA draft, the four UConn players tabbed "TASS Force" (Tamika Williams, Asjha Jones, Sue Bird, Swin Cash) were all first round selections, each having immediate impact with their WNBA team.

In the 2016 WNBA draft UConn performed even better, with the three seniors Breanna Stewart, Moriah Jefferson and Morgan Tuck sweeping the first three picks for the first time in the history of any major sport.

== Trophies and awards ==
- 12 NCAA Tournament Championships (1995, 2000, 2002–2004, 2009–2010, 2013–2016, 2025)
- 30 Conference tournament Championships: 23 Big East Conference (1989, 1991, 1994–2002, 2005, 2006, 2008–2012, 2021–2025) and 7 American Athletic Conference (2014–2020)
- 31 Conference regular season Championships: 24 Big East Conference (1989–1991, 1994–2004, 2007–2011, 2021–2025) and 7 American Athletic Conference (2014–2020)

Team of the Decade 2000–2009 In 2010 Sports Illustrated selected the top 25 sports franchises of the decade 2000–2009. The sports under consideration were the four major professional sports (NFL, MLB, NBA and NHL) along with the three most prominent college sports: football, men's basketball and women's basketball. The Connecticut Huskies were the #3 selection on the list, behind only the professional basketball Lakers and the professional football Patriots, making the Connecticut women's basketball team the highest ranked of the collegiate teams for the three sports under consideration. During this period, UConn won five national titles, while making the Final Four seven of the ten years. Two of the seasons (2001–02 and 2008–09) resulted in perfect 39–0 records.

== Records and achievements ==
=== Overall ===
- Most NCAA Championships, any division, men's or women's (12)
- Most NCAA Division I Final Fours, men's or women's (24)
- Most NCAA Division I Elite Eights, women's (28)
- Most NCAA Division I tournament #1 seeds, men's or women's (22)
- Most NCAA Division I undefeated seasons, men's or women's (6)
- Most NCAA Division I 30-win seasons, men's or women's (27)
- Most NCAA Division I weeks ranked No. 1 in AP National poll, women's (250)

=== Streaks ===
Active streaks in bold

- Most consecutive NCAA Championships, any division, women's (4, 2013–2016)
- Most consecutive NCAA Division I Final Fours, men's or women's (14, 2008–2022)
- Most consecutive NCAA Division I Elite Eights, men's or women's (16, 2006–2022)
- **Most consecutive NCAA Division I Sweet Sixteen, men's or women's (32, 1994–)**
- Most consecutive NCAA Division I tournament wins, women's (28, 2013–2017)
- Most consecutive NCAA wins, any division, men's or women's (111, 2014–2017)
- Most consecutive NCAA Division I regular-season wins, men's or women's (126, 2014–2019)
- Most consecutive NCAA Division I home court wins, women's (99, 2007–2012)
- Most consecutive NCAA Division I road wins, men's or women's (62, 2014–2019)
- Most consecutive NCAA Division I 30-win seasons, men's or women's (14, 2006–2019)
- **Most consecutive NCAA Division I weeks ranked in AP National Top 25 poll, women's (615, 1993–)**

== See also ==
- List of teams with the most victories in NCAA Division I women's college basketball
- Huskies of Honor
- List of UConn Huskies in the WNBA draft
- UConn Huskies women's basketball statistical leaders

== Roster ==
2026–27 UConn Huskies women's basketball team
Players
Coaches

Pos.	#	Name	Height	Year	Previous school	Hometown
G	2	KK Arnold	5 ft 9 in (1.75 m)	Sr	Germantown	Germantown, WI
F	4	Blanca Quiñónez	6 ft 1 in (1.85 m)	So		Milagro, Ecuador
G	5	Marine Dursus	5 ft 10 in (1.78 m)	Fr		Strasbourg, France
G	7	Kelis Fisher	5 ft 9 in (1.75 m)	So	IMG Academy	Baltimore, MD
C	8	Jana El-Alfy	6 ft 5 in (1.96 m)	RS Jr	Al Ahly SC	Cairo, Egypt
G	9	Kayleigh Heckel	5 ft 9 in (1.75 m)	Jr	USC	Port Chester, NY
G	11	Allie Ziebell	6 ft 0 in (1.83 m)	Jr	Neenah	Neenah, WI
G	12	Ashlynn Shade	5 ft 10 in (1.78 m)	Sr	La Lumiere	Noblesville, IN
G	13	Jovana Popovic	5 ft 9 in (1.75 m)	Fr		Vrbas, Serbia
F	21	Sarah Strong	6 ft 2 in (1.88 m)	Jr	Grace Christian Sanford	Fuquay-Varina, NC
G	23	Morgan Cheli	6 ft 2 in (1.88 m)	RS So	Archbishop Mitty	San Jose, CA
C	25	Olivia Vukosa	6 ft 4 in (1.93 m)	Fr	Christ The King	Whitestone, NY
F	42	Gandy Malou-Mamel	6 ft 5 in (1.96 m)	So	Gill St. Bernard's	Limerick, Ireland

Head coach

- Geno Auriemma (West Chester)

Assistant coach(es)

- Chris Dailey (Rutgers)
- Morgan Valley (Connecticut)
- Tonya Cardoza (Virginia)
- Nykesha Sales (Connecticut)

Legend

- (C) Team captain
- (S) Suspended
- (I) Ineligible
- (W) Walk-on
- Injured
- Current redshirt

Roster
Last update: September 19, 2026
