= Pittsburgh Panthers women's basketball =

2026–27 Pittsburgh Panthers women's basketball team
- University: University of Pittsburgh
- Head coach: Robin Harmony (1st season)
- Location: Pittsburgh, Pennsylvania
- Arena: Petersen Events Center (capacity: 12,508)
- Conference: Atlantic Coast Conference
- Nickname: Panthers
- Colors: Blue and gold
- Student section: Oakland Zoo

NCAA Division I tournament Sweet Sixteen
- 2008, 2009

NCAA Division I tournament appearances
- 2007, 2008, 2009, 2015

Conference regular-season champions
- 1984

Uniforms
Home	Away	Alternate

Pittsburgh Panthers women's basketball is the NCAA Division I intercollegiate women's basketball program of the University of Pittsburgh, often referred to as "Pitt", located in Pittsburgh, Pennsylvania. The Pittsburgh women's basketball team competes in the Atlantic Coast Conference and play their home games in the Petersen Events Center. The university first sponsored women's basketball at the varsity level in 1914. The team appeared in five straight national post-season tournaments between 2006 and 2010.

== History ==
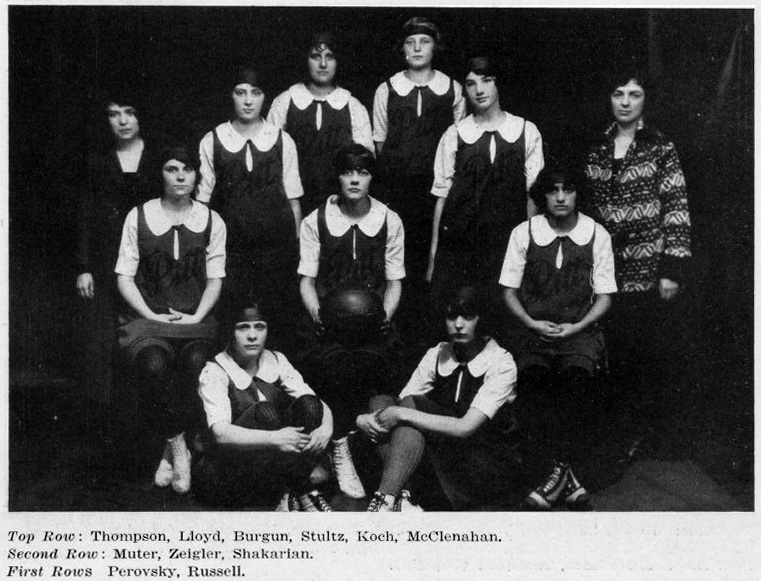
The undefeated 1924–25 Pittsburgh women's varsity basketball team went 10–0 with wins against Cincinnati, at NYU, and at Temple, who had never before been defeated on their home floor.

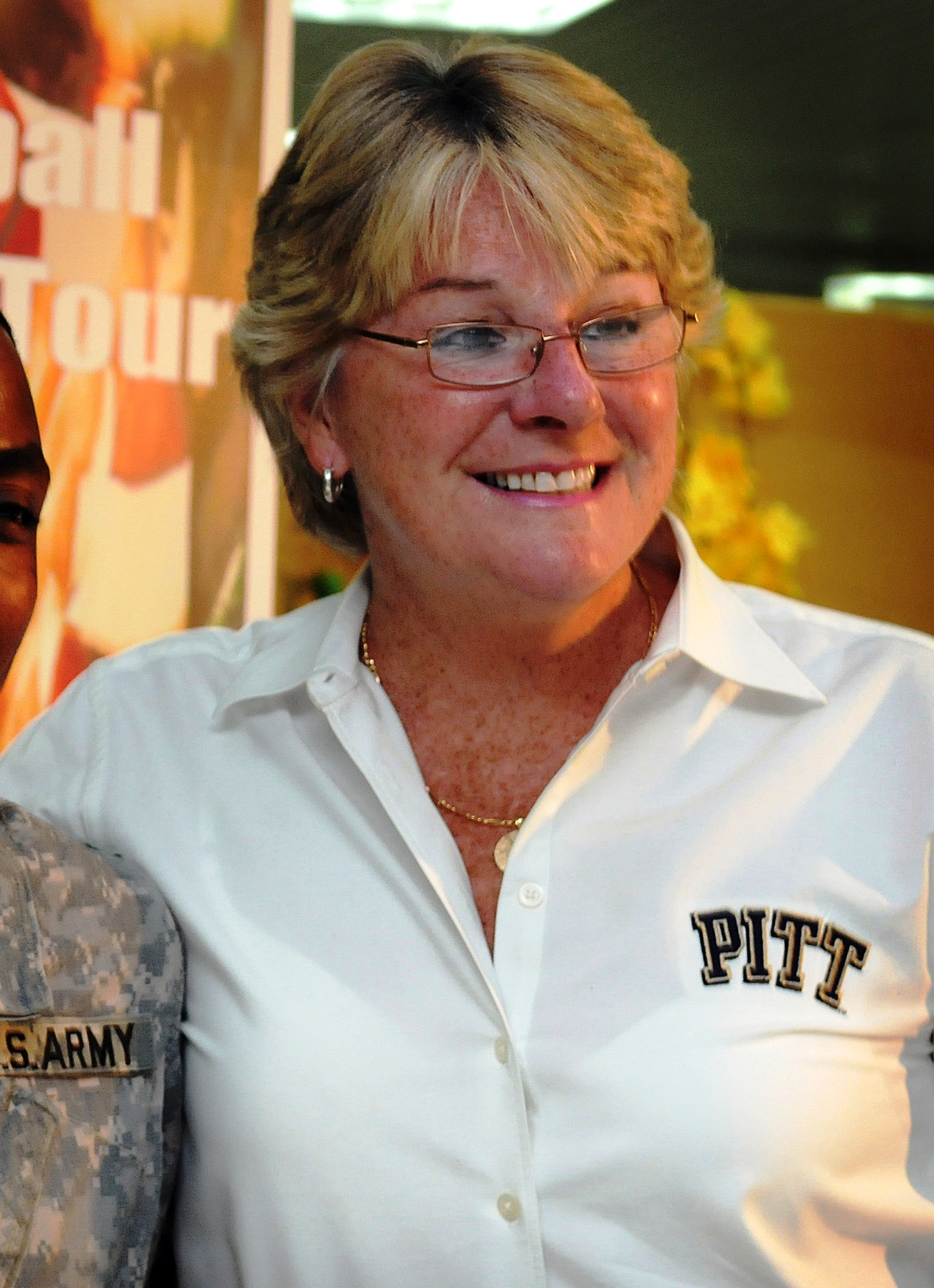
Former head coach of the Pittsburgh women's basketball team, Agnus Berenato

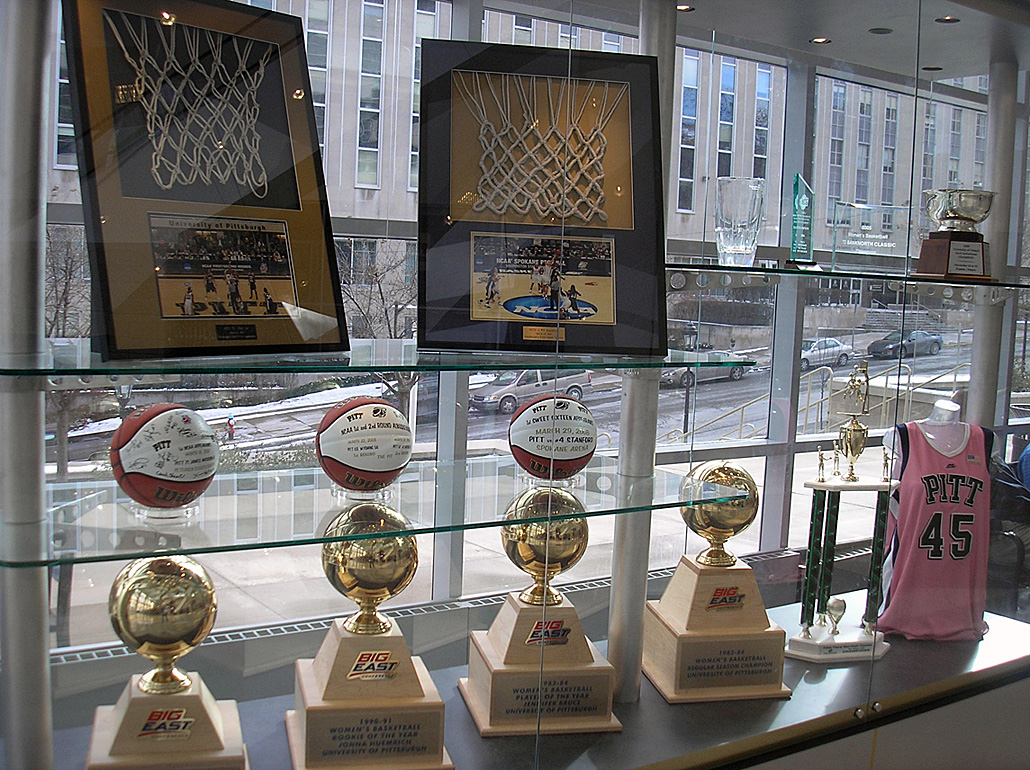
Trophy case for Pittsburgh women's basketball in the lobby of the Petersen Events Center in 2008

Women's intercollegiate varsity basketball at the University of Pittsburgh began during the 1914–1915 season and found early success in 1926–1927, after which it was disbanded in favor of intramural sports programs. Varsity basketball for women was reinstated during the 1970–1971 season. Although participants were awarded varsity letters and competed intercollegiately, the program was not taken over by the Athletic Department until the 1974–1975 season. During the 1970s, the team earned several EAIAW regional tournament appearances. The team began competing in the Big East Conference in 1982, and the Panthers won the Big East regular season championship in 1984. Pittsburgh appeared in the National Women's Invitational Tournament in 1981 and 1994 as well as the Women's National Invitation Tournament in 2000 and 2006 before earning its first ever NCAA tournament appearance in 2007, where they advanced to the second round before losing to eventual national champion Tennessee. The Panthers advanced to the Sweet Sixteen in 2008 and 2009, and made their fifth straight post-season tournament appearance in the WNIT in 2010. On April 12, 2013, the program hired Suzie McConnell-Serio to replace Berenato as head coach. Pittsburgh moved to the Atlantic Coast Conference (ACC) beginning with the 2013–14 season.

== Postseason results ==
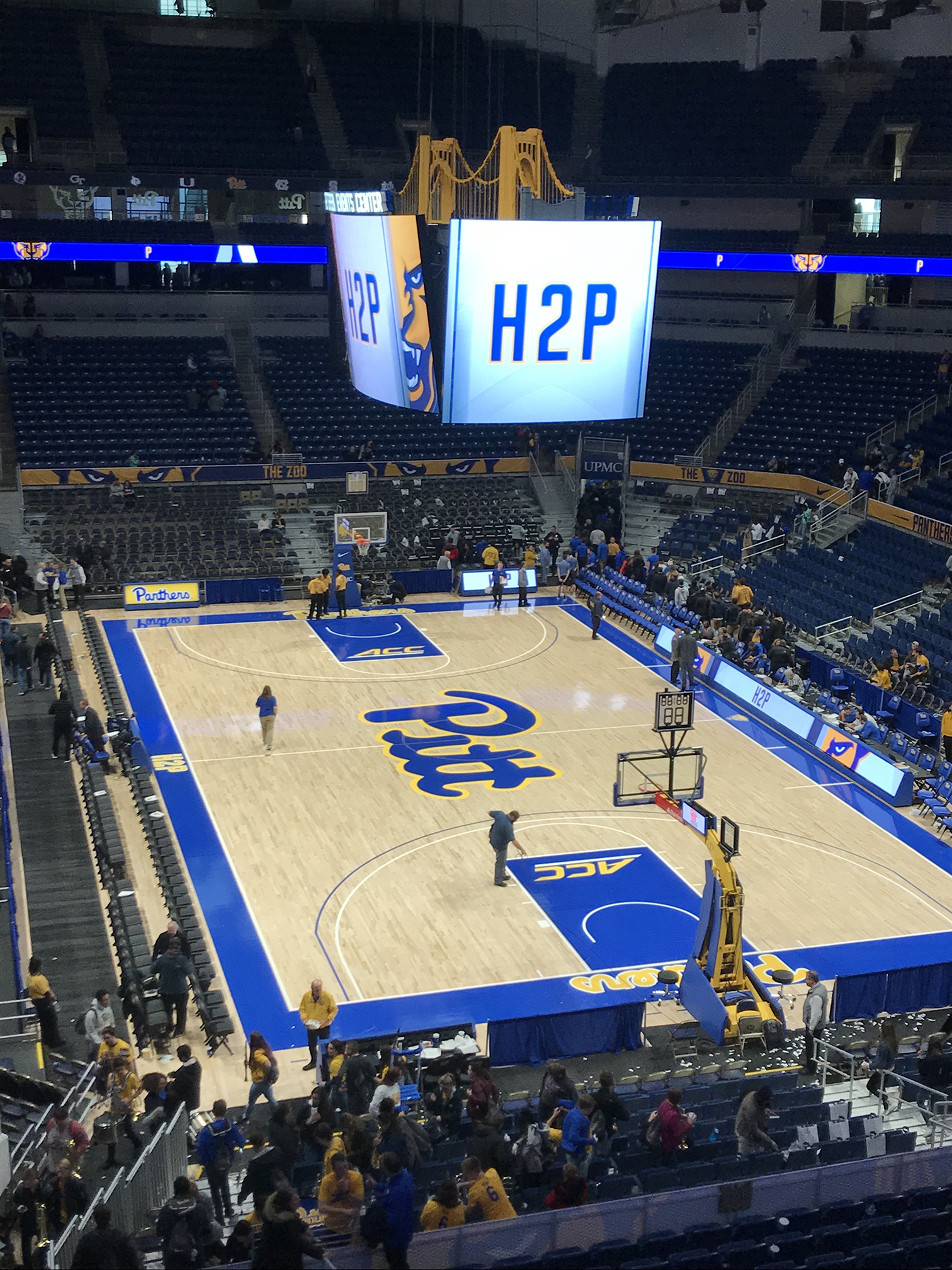
The home of Pittsburgh women's basketball, the Petersen Events Center, in November 2019

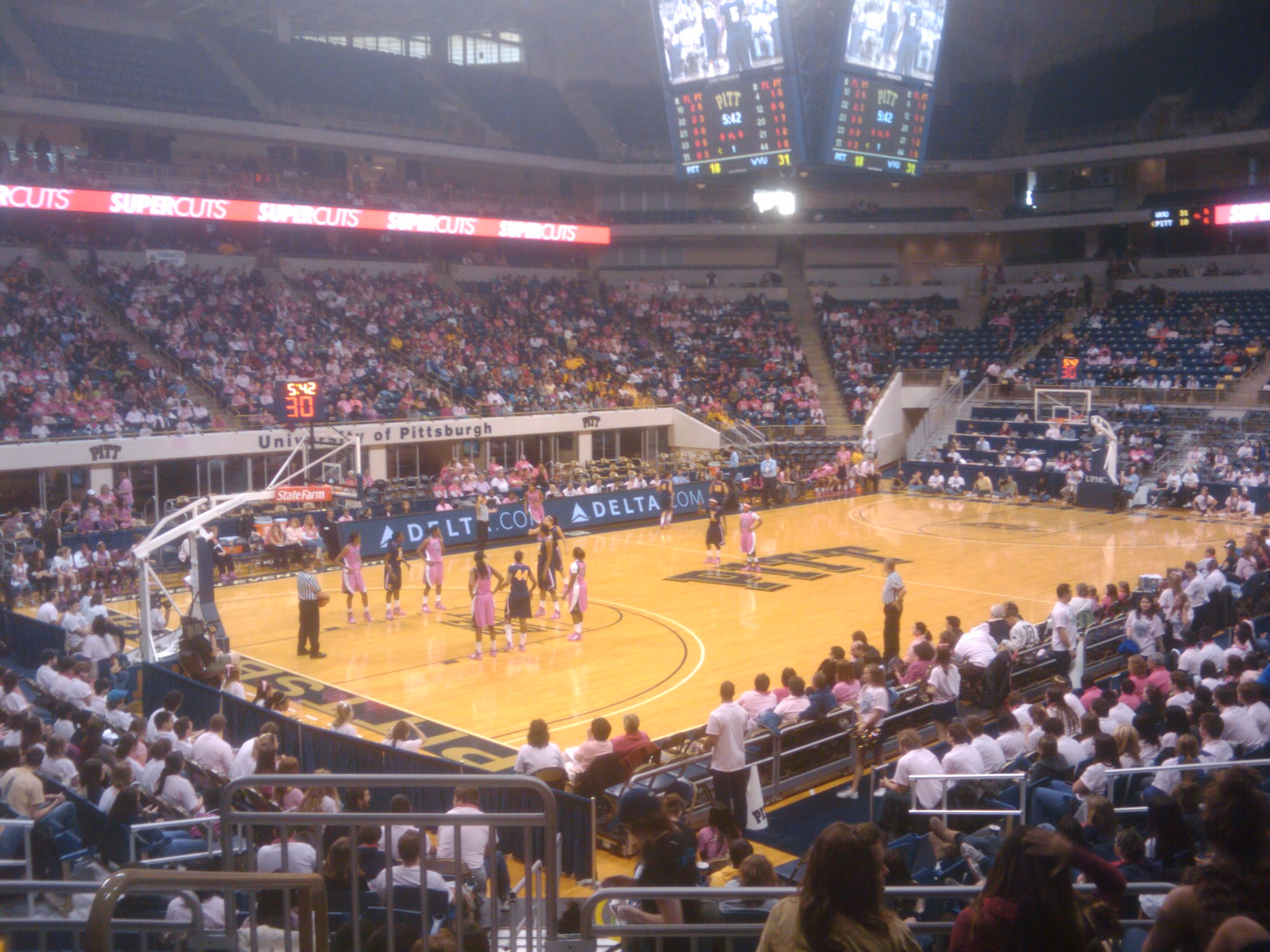
Pittsburgh hosting West Virginia in the Pink the Petersen edition of the Backyard Brawl on February 19, 2011

=== NCAA Division I ===
Pittsburgh has appeared in the NCAA tournament four times. They have a record of 6–4.

Year	Seed	Round	Opponent	Result
2007	#8	First Round; Second Round	James Madison; Tennessee	W 71–61; L 54–68
2008	#6	First Round; Second Round; Sweet Sixteen	Wyoming; Baylor; Stanford	W 63–58; W 67–59; L 53–72
2009	#4	First Round; Second Round; Sweet Sixteen	Montana; Gonzaga; Oklahoma	W 64–35; W 65–60; L 59–70
2015	#10	First Round; Second Round	Chattanooga; Tennessee	W 51–40; L 67–77

=== NWIT ===
NWIT and WNIT (5): 1981, 1994, 2000, 2006, 2010
Pittsburgh was the NWIT Consolation Winner in 1981 (5th place), won the NWIT Third Place game in 1994, and reached the WNIT "Final Four" in 2006.

=== AIAW ===
EAIAW regional championship tournaments (6): 1976, 1977, 1978, 1979, 1980, 1981

== Honors ==
=== All Americans ===
- Jennifer Bruce, 1984–85 WBCA All-District All-American
- Lorri Johnson, 1990–91 WBCA All-District All-American
- Jonna Huemrich, 1993–94 Honorable Mention All-American
- Marcedes Walker, 2006–07 WBCA District I All-American
- Marcedes Walker, 2007–08 WBCA District I All-American
- Shavonte Zellous, 2008–09 AP Third Team All-American and WBCA Region I All-American

=== Academic All-Americans ===
- Pam Miklasevich, 1981 College Sports Information Directors of America

=== Conference honors ===
- Jennifer Bruce won Big East Player of the Year in 1984.
- Judy Saurer won Big East Coach of the Year in 1984.
- Jonna Huemrich won Big East Rookie of the Year in 1991.
- Traci Waites won Big East Coach of the Year in 2000.
- Shavonte Zellous won Big East Most Improved Player in 2007.
- Liatu King won ACC Most Improved Player in 2024.

=== Points club ===
22 total Panther players have achieved the 1,000 points club, with three scoring over 2,000 points.

- Lorri Johnson, 1987–91; 2,312 points, 20.5 PPG
- Jennifer Bruce, 1981–85; 2,295 points, 20.5 PPG
- Shavonte Zellous, 2005–09; 2,251 points, 16.9 PPG
- Debbie Lewis, 1977–82; 1,941 points, 15.4 PPG
- Brianna Kissel, 2011–2015; 1938 points, 15.9 PPG
- Mercedes Walker, 2004–08; 1,870 points, 15.0 PPG
- Jonna Huemrich, 1990–94; 1,807 points, 15.6 PPG
- Pam Miklasevich, 1979–83; 1,637 points, 16.0 PPG
- Wanda Randolph, 1976–79; 1,479 points, 19.0 PPG
- Taneisha Harrison, 2007–2011; 1,372 points, 10.6 PPG
- Laine Selwyn, 1999–2003; 1,344 points, 12.1 PPG
- Xenia Stewart, 2005–2009; 1,330 points, 10.1 PPG
- Latia Howard, 1994–97; 1,155 points, 13.1 PPG
- Mandy Wittenmyer, 1999–2003; 1,152 points, 12.0 PPG
- Brooke Stewart, 1999–2003; 1,114 points, 10.0 PPG
- Connie Hurt, 1987–91; 1,103 points, 10.5 PPG
- Jania Sims, 2006–2011; 1,097, 10.1 PPG
- Yacine Diop, 2014–18; 1,093 points, 11.5 PPG
- Dayshanette Harris, 2019–2023; 1085, 10.6 PPG
- Jennifer Shingler, 1986–90; 1,081 points, 10.0 PPG
- Liatu King, 2020–2024; 1073 points, 10.5 PPG (through 2/18/24)
- Mallorie Winn*, 2002–2008; 1,028 points, 9.9 PPG

* Winn played at Georgia Tech from 2002 to 2004 prior to transferring to Pitt. She scored 812 of her 1,028 career points at Pitt.
PPG = points per game

== WNBA ==
The following former Pittsburgh basketball players have or are currently playing in the WNBA.

- Laine Selwyn, Indiana Fever, 2008
- Marcedes Walker, Houston Comets, 2008
- Shavonte Zellous, Detroit Shock, 2009–2021

=== Draft ===
The following players were selected in the WNBA draft.

- 2009 Shavonte Zellous, 1st round, 11th pick, Detroit Shock
- 2015 Brianna Kiesel, 2nd round, 13th pick, Tulsa Shock

== Year by year results ==
Pitt's varsity women's basketball program, the only women's varsity sport at the school during that time, was started in the 1914–15 season and continued until 1926–1927, when it was dropped in favor of a program of intramural women's athletics that could provide more opportunities for the female students at the university. The varsity women's basketball program was revived for the 1970–71 season and moved under the auspices of the athletic department in 1974–75. Records prior to the 1974–75 are largely incomplete (see notes).

Season	Coach	Overall	Conference	Standing	Postseason	Coaches' poll	AP poll	Notes
H. H. Provin (1914–1920)
1914–15	H. H. Provin	?-1	—	—				incomplete records, reported all wins but 1 loss
1915–16	H. H. Provin	7–0	—	—				
1916–17	H. H. Provin	6–0	—	—				
1917–18	H. H. Provin	9–1	—	—				
1918–19	H. H. Provin	8–0	—	—				not including win over Alumnae
1919–20	H. H. Provin	8–0	—	—				one win by forfeit
H. H. Provin:		incomplete	–					
A. Lemon Arnold (1920–1921)
1920–21	A. Lemon Arnold	9–0	—	—				3 game results unknown
A. Lemon Arnold:		incomplete	–					
Margaret A. McClenahan (1921–1927)
1921–22	Margaret A. McClenahan	6–1	—	—				incomplete records
1922–23	Margaret A. McClenahan	6–3–1	—	—				one tie, not including win over Freshman
1923–24	Margaret A. McClenahan	8–1	—	—				not including win over Alumnae; 2 wins over Temple found only in Temple's media guide
1924–25	Margaret A. McClenahan	9–0	—	—				not including win over Alumnae
1925–26	Margaret A. McClenahan	2-?	—	—				7-game season, incomplete records
1926–27	Margaret A. McClenahan	4–2	—	—				not including win over Alumnae
Margaret A. McClenahan:		incomplete	–					
No program (1927–1970)
Sandra Bullman (1970–1974)
1970–71	Sandra Bullman	9–2	—	—				individual game results unknown
1971–72	Sandra Bullman	4–2	—	—				
1972–73	Sandra Bullman	?-?	—	—				unknown results
1973–74	Sandra Bullman	?-?	—	—				unknown results
Sandra Bullman:		incomplete	–					
Jean Condo (1974–1975)
1974–75	Jean Condo	10–6	—	—				
Jean Condo:		10–6	–					
Pat Wallace (1975–1977)
1975–76	Pat Wallace	16–8	—	—	EAIAW Regional (3–1, consolation champions)			
1976–77	Pat Wallace	19–8	—	—	EAIAW Regional (1–2)			
Pat Wallace:		35–16	–					
Jean Balthaser (1977–1980)
1977–78	Jean Balthaser	14–14	—	—	EAIAW Regional (1–1)			
1978–79	Jean Balthaser	12–17	—	—	EAIAW Regional (0–1)			
1979–80	Jean Balthaser	21–11	—	—	EAIAW Regional (0–1)			
Jean Balthaser:		47–42	–					
Judy Saurer (Big East Conference beginning in 1982–83) (1980–1985)
1980–81	Judy Saurer	22–7	—	—	NWIT Fifth Place; Regionals (0–1)			
1981–82	Judy Saurer	14–14	—	—				
1982–83	Judy Saurer	17–11	5–3	3rd				
1983–84	Judy Saurer	16–12	6–2	T-1st				
1984–85	Judy Saurer	16–12	10–6	T-4th				
Judy Saurer:		85–56	21–11					
Kirk Bruce (Big East Conference) (1985–1998)
1985–86	Kirk Bruce	11–16	5–11	6th				
1986–87	Kirk Bruce	7–21	1–15	9th				
1987–88	Kirk Bruce	14–15	5–11	7th				
1988–89	Kirk Bruce	11–17	3–13	9th				
1989–90	Kirk Bruce	15–14	6–10	6th				
1990–91	Kirk Bruce	16–13	10–6	T-3rd				
1991–92	Kirk Bruce	11–18	6–12	7th				
1992–93	Kirk Bruce	15–12	10–8	T-4th				
1993–94	Kirk Bruce	21–10	12–6	3rd	NWIT Third Place			
1994–95	Kirk Bruce	17–11	10–8	T-4th				
1995–96	Kirk Bruce	6–24	3–15	7th (BE 7)				
1996–97	Kirk Bruce	8–22	3–15	7th (BE 7)				
1997–98	Kirk Bruce	6–21	3–15	7th (BE 7)				
Kirk Bruce:		158–214	77–145					
Traci Waites (Big East Conference) (1998–2003)
1998–99	Traci Waites	8–19	3–15	T-12th				
1999–2000	Traci Waites	16–13	7–9	T-6th	WNIT first round			
2000–01	Traci Waites	9–18	3–13	T-12th				
2001–02	Traci Waites	8–19	3–13	13th				
2002–03	Traci Waites	12–16	4–12	T-11th				
Traci Waites:		53–85	20–62					
Agnus Berenato (Big East Conference) (2003–2013)
2003–04	Agnus Berenato	6–20	2–14	13th				
2004–05	Agnus Berenato	13–15	5–11	10th				
2005–06	Agnus Berenato	22–11	9–7	T-6th	WNIT semifinals			
2006–07	Agnus Berenato	24–9	10–6	T-5th	NCAA round of 32			
2007–08	Agnus Berenato	24–11	10–6	T-5th	NCAA Sweet Sixteen	16		
2008–09	Agnus Berenato	25–8	12–4	3rd	NCAA Sweet Sixteen	15	15	
2009–10	Agnus Berenato	16–15	5–11	T-12th	WNIT first round			
2010–11	Agnus Berenato	14–17	5–11	12th				
2011–12	Agnus Berenato	8–21	0–16	16th				
2012–13	Agnus Berenato	9–21	0–16	15th				
Agnus Berenato:		161–148	58–102					
Suzie McConnell-Serio (Atlantic Coast Conference) (2013–2018)
2013–14	Suzie McConnell-Serio	11–20	3–13	T-14th				
2014–15	Suzie McConnell-Serio	20–12	9–7	7th	NCAA second round			
2015–16	Suzie McConnell-Serio	13–18	4–12	T-13th				
2016–17	Suzie McConnell-Serio	13–17	4–12	T-11th				
2017–18	Suzie McConnell-Serio	10–20	2–14	13th				
Suzie McConnell-Serio:		67–87	22–58					
Lance White (Atlantic Coast Conference) (2018–2023)
2018–19	Lance White	11–20	2–14	14th				
2019–20	Lance White	5–26	1–17	15th				
2020–21	Lance White	5–14	3–12	12th				
2021–22	Lance White	11–19	2–16	T-14th				
2022–23	Lance White	10–20	3–15	15th				
Lance White:		44–99	11–74					
Tory Verdi (Atlantic Coast Conference) (2024–2026)
2023–24	Tory Verdi	8–24	2–16	T-14th				
2024–25	Tory Verdi	13–18	5–13	15th				
Tory Verdi:		21–42	7–29					
Total:		669–793						
National champion Postseason invitational champion Conference regular season champion Conference regular season and conference tournament champion Division regular season champion Division regular season and conference tournament champion Conference tournament champion

== NCAA tournament results ==
Year	Seed	Round	Opponent	Result
2007	#8	First Round; Second Round	#9 James Madison #1 Tennessee	W 71–61; L 68–54
2008	#6	First Round; Second Round; Sweet Sixteen	#11 Wyoming; 3 Baylor #2 Stanford	W 63–58; W 67–59; L 72–53
2009	#4	First Round; Second Round; Sweet Sixteen	#13 Montana; 12 Gonzaga #1 Oklahoma	W 64–35; W 65–60; L 70–59
2015	#10	First Round; Second Round	#7 Chattanooga #2 Tennessee	W 51–40; L 77–67

== Retired numbers ==
Pittsburgh Panthers retired numbers
No.	Player	Position	Career	Year of Retirement
12	Jennifer Bruce	F	1981-85	2023
24	Lorri Johnson	F	1987-92	2019

== Current roster ==
2026–27 Pittsburgh Panthers women's basketball team
Players
Coaches

Pos.	#	Name	Height	Year	Previous school	Hometown
G	0	Taylor Barbot	5 ft 9 in (1.75 m)	Sr	Charleston	Floral Park, NY
G	1	Mayse Hill	5 ft 11 in (1.8 m)	So	Fordham	South Kingstown, RI
G	2	Jazmyne Bynum	5 ft 7 in (1.7 m)	So	Miami Dade	Chicago, IL
G	3	Madison Crawford	5 ft 6 in (1.68 m)	Fr	Mansfield Legacy	Mansfield, TX
G	5	Taryn Barbot	5 ft 10 in (1.78 m)	Sr	Charleston	Floral Park, NY
	7	Jamisen Hill	5 ft 11 in (1.8 m)	Sr	Charleston	South Kingstown, RI
F	11	Avery Watkins	6 ft 2 in (1.88 m)	GS	Fresno State	Seattle, WA
G	17	CeCe Legaspi	5 ft 10 in (1.78 m)	Jr	California Baptist	Meridian, ID
C	21	Ande'a Cherisier	6 ft 1 in (1.85 m)	Sr	Delaware	Baltimore, MD
G	25	Macie Arzner	5 ft 11 in (1.8 m)	So	McMinnville	McMinnville, OR
F	32	Alancia Ramsey	6 ft 1 in (1.85 m)	Sr	Alabama	Delray Beach, FL
C	35	Meredith Venner	6 ft 3 in (1.91 m)	So	Miami Dade	San Andrés, Colombia

Head coach

- Robin Harmony (Miami (FL))

Assistant coach(es)

- Randy Javier Schneider (FIU)
- Greg Long (Delta State)
- Madison Taylor (College of Charleston)

Legend

- (C) Team captain
- (S) Suspended
- (I) Ineligible
- (W) Walk-on
- Injured
- Current redshirt

Roster
Last update: August 30, 2026
