= 2010–11 Pittsburgh Panthers women's basketball team =

Intercollegiate basketball season

2010–11 Pittsburgh Panthers women's basketball
- Conference: Big East Conference
- Record: 14–17 (5–11 Big East)
- Head coach: Agnus Berenato
- Assistant coaches: Patty Coyle; Khadija Head; Mallorie Winn
- Home arena: Petersen Events Center

2010–11 Big East Conference women's basketball standings
	Conf.				Overall
Team	W		L	PCT	W		L	PCT
Connecticut†	16	–	0	1.000	36	–	2	.947
DePaul	13	–	3	.813	29	–	7	.806
Notre Dame	13	–	3	.813	31	–	8	.795
Rutgers	11	–	5	.688	20	–	13	.606
Marquette	10	–	6	.625	24	–	9	.727
Louisville	10	–	6	.625	22	–	13	.629
Syracuse	9	–	7	.563	25	–	10	.714
Georgetown	9	–	7	.563	24	–	11	.686
St. John's	9	–	7	.563	22	–	11	.667
West Virginia	8	–	8	.500	24	–	10	.706
Providence	6	–	10	.375	13	–	16	.448
Pittsburgh	5	–	11	.313	14	–	17	.452
South Florida	3	–	13	.188	12	–	19	.387
Villanova	3	–	13	.188	12	–	19	.387
Cincinnati	2	–	14	.125	9	–	20	.310
Seton Hall	1	–	15	.063	8	–	22	.267
† 2011 Big East Basketball Tournament winner Rankings from AP poll

The 2010–11 Pittsburgh Panthers women's basketball team represented the University of Pittsburgh in the 2010–11 NCAA Division I women's basketball season. The Panthers, coached by Agnus Berenato, suffered their first losing season since 2004-05. The Panthers were a member of the Big East Conference, and played their home games at the Petersen Events Center in Pittsburgh, Pennsylvania.

== Previous season ==
The 2010-11 Pitt women's basketball went 16-15, a disappointing finish considering that in December, the team had climbed as high as 15th in the nation in both the AP and Coaches national polls. Finishing with the 12th seed in the Big East tournament, the Panthers lost in the first round of the tournament to Louisville, but still earned its fifth straight post-season national tournament appearance in the 2010 Women's National Invitation Tournament. However, Pitt lost its opening game in the WNIT at Toledo.

== Offseason ==
The Panthers returned four starters, losing only starting forward sophomore Pepper Wilson. The offseason was characterized by an unusual turnover in both players and coaching staff. Center/forward Pepper Wilson, sophomore forward Kate Popovec, and sophomore guard Sarah Ogoke transferred, while assistant coaches Jeff Williams, Caroline McCombs, and Yolette McPhee-McCuin all left to pursue additional opportunities. Incoming players included forward Kyra Dunn as well as guards Marquel Davis, Yasmin Fuller, and Asia Logan. This left the Panthers with an unusual distribution of players by academic class, with five seniors and six freshmen, but no juniors or sophomores. New coaches included the former head coach of the WNBA's New York Liberty, Patty Coyle, along with Khadija Head, and former Pitt point guard Mallorie Winn.

The women's basketball team entered the season with modest external expectation, having been picked to finish 13th in the Big East Conference in a preseason poll of conference coaches. The Panthers started the season by receiving two votes in the preseason national top 25 AP Poll.

== Roster ==
Number	Name	Height	Position	Class	Hometown
23	Ashlee Anderson	5-9	Guard	Freshman (RS)	Chicago, IL
42	Leeza Burdgess	6-5	Center	Freshman (RS)	Miami, FL
22	Chelsea Cole	6-3	Forward	Senior	Lumberton, NJ
13	Marquel Davis	5-9	Guard	Freshman	Fredericksburg, VA
33	Kyra Dunn	6-3	Forward	Freshman	Sacramento, CA
55	Yasmin Fuller	5-8	Guard	Freshman	Seattle, WA
10	Taneisha Harrison	6-0	Guard	Senior	Bowie, MD
0	Asia Logan	6-0	Guard	Freshman	Baltimore, MD
24	Jessica Renaud	5-11	Guard	Freshman	Downingtown, PA
25	Shayla Scott	6-1	Forward	Senior	Monroeville, PA
14	Jania Sims	5-7	Guard	Senior (RS)	Newark, NJ
12	Brittaney Thomas*	5-8	Guard	Senior (RS)	Montgomery, AL

*Dismissed from the team during the season following the St. Francis (PA) game on December 1, 2010 for a violation of team rules.

== Schedule ==
Pitt's 2010-11 schedule.

Date time, TV	Rank^{#}	Opponent^{#}	Result	Record	Site (attendance) city, state
Exhibition
Fri, Nov. 5*; 7:00 pm, Comcast Network^{^}		Seton Hill	W 72–55		Petersen Events Center (2,093); Pittsburgh, PA
Regular season
Fri, Nov. 12*; 11:00 a.m., Comcast Network		Youngstown State	W 78–58	1–0	Petersen Events Center (4,143); Pittsburgh, PA
Wed, Nov. 17*; 8:00 p.m., BigTenNetwork.com		at Minnesota; Super Six Series	L 63–73	1–1	Williams Arena (2,752); Minneapolis, MN
Sun, Nov. 21*; 2:00 p.m., Comcast Network		Radford	W 77–46	2–1	Petersen Events Center (1,816); Pittsburgh, PA
Wed, Nov. 24*; 7:00 p.m.		No. 6 Duke	L 55–93	2–2	Petersen Events Center (2,720); Pittsburgh, PA
Sun, Nov. 28*; 2:00 p.m., Comcast Network		Loyola (MD)	W 73–45	3–2	Petersen Events Center (1,757); Pittsburgh, PA
Wed, Dec. 1*; 7:00 p.m.		at St. Francis (PA)	L 71–85	3–3	DeGol Arena (1,237); Loretto, PA
Sat, Dec. 4*; 6:00 p.m., Comcast Network		Mount St. Mary's	W 66–30	4–3	Petersen Events Center (1,708); Pittsburgh, PA
Tue, Dec. 7; 7:00 p.m., Comcast Network		No. 24 DePaul	L 51–67	4–4 (0–1)	Petersen Events Center (1,972); Pittsburgh, PA
Sat, Dec. 11*; 2:35 p.m.		at Valparaiso	W 86–51	5–4 (0–1)	Athletics–Recreation Center (492); Valparaiso, IN
Sun, Dec. 19*; 3:00 p.m.		vs. Texas Tech; Las Vegas Holiday Hoops Classic	L 65–78	5–5 (0–1)	South Point Arena (n/a); Enterprise, NV
Mon, Dec. 20*; 3:00 p.m.		vs. Texas–Arlington; Las Vegas Holiday Hoops Classic	W 95–61	6–5 (0–1)	South Point Arena (1,151); Enterprise, NV
Tue, Dec. 28*; 7:00 p.m., Comcast Network		Austin Peay	W 75–53	7–5 (0–1)	Petersen Events Center (2,019); Pittsburgh, PA
Fri, Dec. 31*; 1:00 p.m., Comcast Network		at Central Michigan	W 94–78	8–5 (0–1)	McGuirk Arena (593); Mount Pleasant, MI
Wed, Jan. 5*; 7:00 p.m.		at Duquesne; City Game	L 62–70	8–6 (0–1)	A. J. Palumbo Center (1,494); Pittsburgh, PA
Sun, Jan. 9; 12:00 p.m., ESPNU		at Louisville	L 68–79	8–7 (0–2)	KFC Yum! Center (9,577); Louisville, KY
Wed, Jan. 12; 7:00 p.m.		at Seton Hall	W 64–58	9–7 (1–2)	Walsh Gymnasium (375); South Orange, NJ
Sat, Jan. 15; 2:00 p.m., Comcast Network		No. 12 Notre Dame	L 50–82	9–8 (1–3)	Petersen Events Center (2,650); Pittsburgh, PA
Sat, Jan. 22; 7:30 p.m.		at No. 2 Connecticut	L 46–66	9–9 (1–4)	XL Center (9,767); Hartford, CT
Wed, Jan. 26; 7:00 p.m.		at Syracuse	L 60–69	9–10 (1–5)	Carrier Dome (1,076); Syracuse, NY
Sat, Jan. 29; 2:00 p.m., Comcast Network		Marquette	L 70–74 ^{OT}	9–11 (1–6)	Petersen Events Center (4,324); Pittsburgh, PA
Tue, Feb. 1; 7:00 p.m., Comcast Network		Cincinnati	W 79–48	10–11 (2–6)	Petersen Events Center (2,076); Pittsburgh, PA
Sat, Feb. 5; 4:00 p.m., ESPN Plus, "Big East Network Game of the Week"		at No. 14 West Virginia; Backyard Brawl	W 60–53	11–11 (3–6)	WVU Coliseum (8,025); Morgantown, WV
Tue, Feb. 8; 7:30 p.m.		at Rutgers	L 42–54	11–12 (3–7)	Louis Brown Athletic Center (2,946); Piscataway, NJ
Sat, Feb. 12; 2:00 p.m., Comcast Network		South Florida	W 70–66	12–12 (4–7)	Petersen Events Center (2,247); Pittsburgh, PA
Tue, Feb. 15; 7:00 p.m., CBS College Sports		Providence	W 60–57	13–12 (5–7)	Petersen Events Center (1,820); Pittsburgh, PA
Sat, Feb. 19; 2:00 p.m., Comcast Network		No. 21 West Virginia; Backyard Brawl, Pink the Petersen	L 79–90	13–13 (5–8)	Petersen Events Center (5,368); Pittsburgh, PA
Wed, Feb. 23; 7:00 p.m.		at No. 18 Georgetown	L 57–67	13–14 (5–9)	McDonough Gymnasium (655); Washington, D.C.
Sat, Feb. 26; 2:00 p.m.		at St. John's	L 63–72	13–15 (5–10)	Carnesecca Arena (1,567); Queens, New York, NY
Mon, Feb. 28; 7:00 p.m., Comcast Network		Villanova	L 52–54	13–16 (5–11)	Petersen Events Center (1,973); Pittsburgh, PA
Postseason^{†} Big East Women's Basketball Championship
Fri, Mar. 4; 12:00 p.m., BIGEAST.tv	No. 12	vs. No. 13 South Florida; First Round	W 63–60	14–16	XL Center (N/A); Hartford, CT
Sat, Mar. 5; 2:00 p.m., ESPN Regional/FSN Pittsburgh/ESPN3	No. 12	vs. No. 5 Marquette; Second Round	L 61–65	14–17	XL Center (8,302); Hartford, CT
*Non-conference game. ^{#}Rankings from AP Poll. ^{^}Tape delay. ^{†}Postseason ranks represent seeds in the applicable tournament. (#) Tournament seedings in parentheses. All times are in Eastern Standard Time.

== Rankings ==
Ranking movement Legend: ██ Improvement in ranking. ██ Decrease in ranking. ██ Not ranked the previous week. rv=Others receiving votes.
Poll	Pre	Wk 1	Wk 2	Wk 3	Wk 4	Wk 5	Wk 6	Wk 7	Wk 8	Wk 9	Wk 10	Wk 11	Wk 12	Wk 13	Wk 14	Wk 15	Wk 16	WK 17	Wk 18	Final
AP	rv	rv	--	--	--	--	--	--	--	--	--	--	--	--	--	--	--	--	--	
Coaches	--	--	--	--	--	--	--	--	--	--	--	--	--	--	--	--	--	--	--	--

== Awards and honors ==
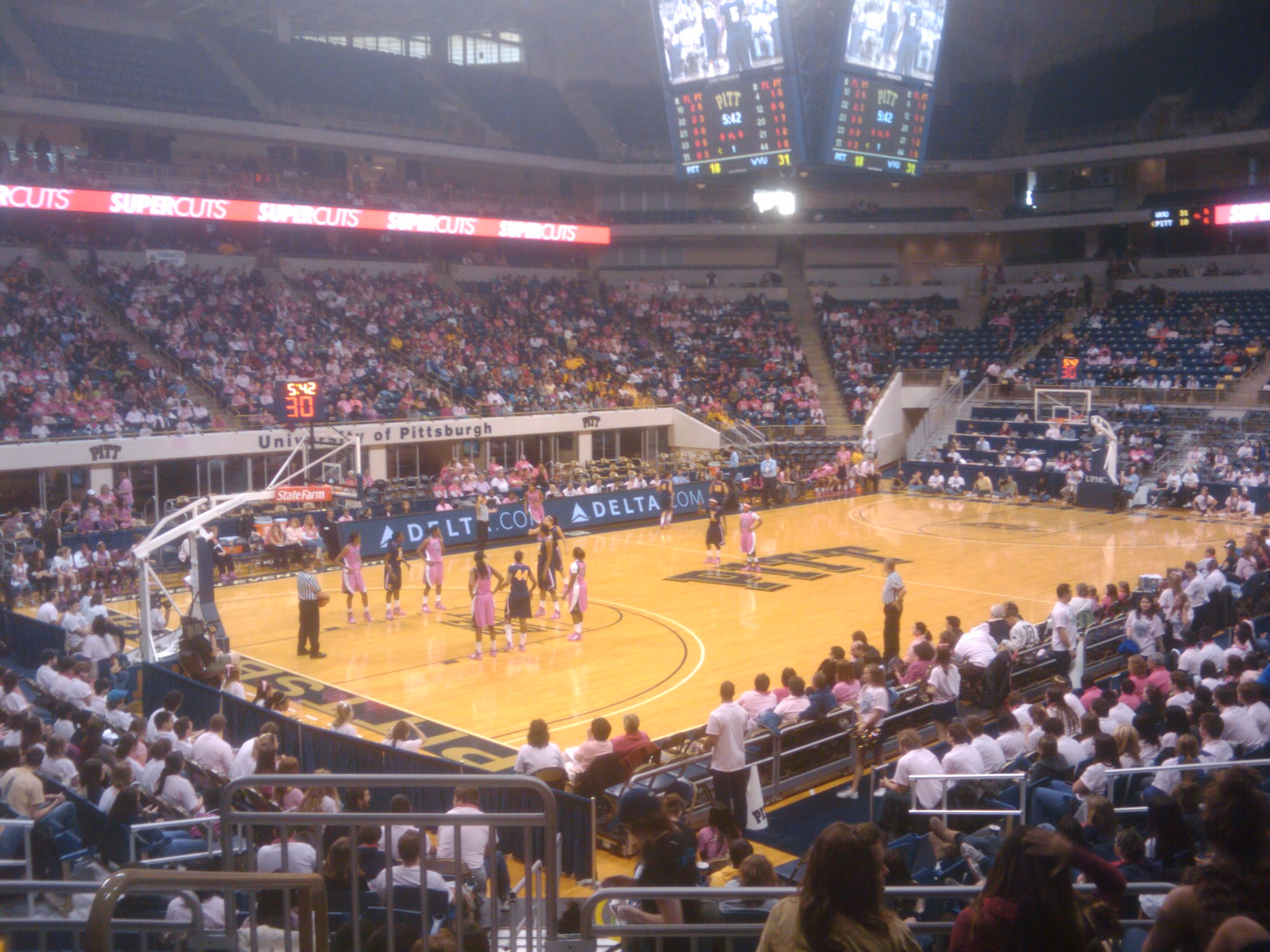
Pitt hosting West Virginia in the Pink the Petersen edition of the Backyard Brawl on February 19, 2011

- Shayla Scott was selected as the College/University winner of the Pat Blayden Spirit of Sport Award.
- Taneisha Harrison was selected to the All-Big East Women’s Basketball Second Team
- Chelsea Cole was tabbed Honorable Mention All-Big East.
- Chelsea Cole became just the fourth player in Pitt women’s basketball history to record 1,000 rebounds over a career. She finished with 1,003 boards.

== See also ==
- Pittsburgh Panthers women's basketball
- Pittsburgh Panthers men's basketball
- 2010–11 Pittsburgh Panthers men's basketball team
- Pittsburgh Panthers
- University of Pittsburgh
- Big East Conference
