= 2011 Big East women's basketball tournament =

- Classification: Division I
- Teams: 16
- Site: XL Center; Hartford, Connecticut
- Champions: Connecticut (17th title)
- Winning coach: Geno Auriemma (17th title)
- Television: BigEast.tv, ESPN3, ESPNU, ESPN

2010–11 Big East Conference women's basketball standings
	Conf.				Overall
Team	W		L	PCT	W		L	PCT
Connecticut†	16	–	0	1.000	36	–	2	.947
DePaul	13	–	3	.813	29	–	7	.806
Notre Dame	13	–	3	.813	31	–	8	.795
Rutgers	11	–	5	.688	20	–	13	.606
Marquette	10	–	6	.625	24	–	9	.727
Louisville	10	–	6	.625	22	–	13	.629
Syracuse	9	–	7	.563	25	–	10	.714
Georgetown	9	–	7	.563	24	–	11	.686
St. John's	9	–	7	.563	22	–	11	.667
West Virginia	8	–	8	.500	24	–	10	.706
Providence	6	–	10	.375	13	–	16	.448
Pittsburgh	5	–	11	.313	14	–	17	.452
South Florida	3	–	13	.188	12	–	19	.387
Villanova	3	–	13	.188	12	–	19	.387
Cincinnati	2	–	14	.125	9	–	20	.310
Seton Hall	1	–	15	.063	8	–	22	.267
† 2011 Big East Basketball Tournament winner Rankings from AP poll

The 2011 Big East women's basketball tournament took place in March 2011 at the XL Center in Hartford, Connecticut. The winner will receive the Big East Conference's automatic bid to the 2011 NCAA tournament. This was the second consecutive year Big East tournament to include all 16 of the conference's teams. The teams finishing 9 through 16 in the regular season standings played first-round games, while teams 5 through 8 received byes to the second round. The top 4 teams during the regular season received double-byes to the quarterfinals.

During the tournament, the top-ranked Connecticut beat Notre Dame 73–64 to win their 17th title.

== Final regular season standings ==
2010–11 Big East Women's Basketball standings
Seed	School	Conf	Overall	Tiebreaker
#1	Connecticut‡	16–0	32–1	
#2	DePaul	13–3	26–6	
#3	Notre Dame	13–3	26–7	
#4	St. John's	12–4	24–5	1–0 vs ND
#5	Notre Dame	12–4	25–4	0–1 vs STJ
#6	Rutgers	9–7	17–13	1–0 vs DPL
#7	DePaul	9–7	20–10	0–1 vs RUT
#8	Providence	7–9	16–13	1–0 vs SYR
#9	Syracuse	7–9	20–9	0–1 vs PROV
#10	Marquette	6–10	15–14	1–0 vs USF
#11	South Florida	6–10	15–14	0–1 vs MARQ
#12	Pittsburgh	5–11	16–13	1–0 vs LOU
#13	Louisville	5–11	13–16	0–1 vs PITT
#14	Cincinnati	4–12	11–17	
#15	Villanova	3–13	14–15	
#16	Seton Hall	1–15	9–20	

‡ Regular season Big East champion

== Bracket ==
First round Friday, March 4, 2012; Bigeast.tv
12	Pittsburgh	63
13	South Florida	60
9	Syracuse	74
16	Seton Hall	44
10	West Virginia	66
15	Cincinnati	41
11	Providence	50
14	Villanova	52^{OT}

Second round Saturday, March 5, 2012; BETV
4	Rutgers
BYE
5	Marquette	65
12	Pittsburgh	61
1	Connecticut
BYE
8	Georgetown	61
9	Syracuse	60
2	DePaul
BYE
7	St. John's	59
10	West Virginia	51
3	Notre Dame
BYE
6	Louisville	69
14	Villanova	47

Quarterfinals; Sunday, March 6, 2012; ESPNU
4	Rutgers	68
5	Marquette	62
1	Connecticut	59
8	Georgetown	43
2	DePaul	66
7	St. John's	54
3	Notre Dame	63
6	Louisville	53

Semifinals; Monday, March 7, 2012; ESPNU
4	Rutgers	51
1	Connecticut	75
2	DePaul	67
3	Notre Dame	71

Championship Game; Tuesday, March 8, 2012; ESPN
1	Connecticut	73
3	Notre Dame	64

- ^{OT} - Denotes Overtime Game
