= 2010–11 Toledo Rockets women's basketball team =

American college basketball season

2010–11 Toledo Rockets women's basketball

ASU Classic Champions

WNIT Champions
- Conference: Mid-American Conference
- West Division
- Record: 29—8 (14—2 MAC)
- Head coach: Tricia Cullop (3rd season)
- Assistant coaches: Vicki Hall; Tony Greene; Tiffany Swoffard
- Home arena: Savage Arena

2010–11 Mid-American Conference women's basketball standings
	Conf.				Overall
Team	W		L	PCT	W		L	PCT
Bowling Green †	13	–	3	.813	28	–	4	.875
Kent State	11	–	5	.688	20	–	9	.690
Buffalo	8	–	8	.500	16	–	15	.516
Akron	6	–	10	.375	14	–	16	.467
Ohio	4	–	12	.250	9	–	22	.290
Miami (OH)	3	–	13	.188	11	–	19	.367
West
Toledo	14	–	2	.875	23	–	8	.742
Central Michigan	11	–	5	.688	20	–	10	.667
Eastern Michigan	10	–	6	.625	22	–	12	.647
Northern Illinois	7	–	9	.438	13	–	17	.433
Western Michigan	5	–	11	.313	9	–	21	.300
Ball State	4	–	12	.250	9	–	21	.300
† 2011 MAC tournament winner Rankings from AP poll

The 2010–11 Toledo Rockets women's basketball team represented University of Toledo during the 2010–11 NCAA Division I women's basketball season. The Rockets, led by third year head coach Tricia Cullop, played their home games at Savage Arena, as members of the West Division of the Mid-American Conference. They finished second in the West Division with a record of 29–8 overall and 14–2 in MAC play. They advanced to the semifinals of the MAC women's tournament, where they lost to Eastern Michigan. They received an at large bid to the Women's National Invitation Tournament, where they won the Tournament defeating USC 76-68 in front of a sellout crowd of 7,301 fans at Savage Arena. It was their second consecutive WNIT Tournament Appearance in a row.

== Roster ==
2010–11 Toledo Rockets women's basketball team
Players
Coaches

Pos.	#	Name	Height	Year	Previous school	Hometown
G	2	Courtney Ingersoll	5 ft 10 in (1.78 m)	Jr	Perry	Massillion, OH
F	3	Lecretia Smith	5 ft 9 in (1.75 m)	So	Elmhurst	Fort Wayne, IN
G	4	Naama Shafir	5 ft 7 in (1.7 m)	So	Ulpanit Tiberias	Hoshaya, Israel
G	5	Janelle Reed-Lewis	5 ft 4 in (1.63 m)	RS Fr	Southeastern	Detroit, MI
F	10	Anna Sonka	6 ft 0 in (1.83 m)	So	Agenskalna State; Cowley Community College	Riga, Latvia
F	11	Kaneesha Lee	6 ft 2 in (1.88 m)	Jr	Mesquite; Cowley Community College	Phoenix, Arizona
G/F	12	Riley McCormick	5 ft 10 in (1.78 m)	So	Regina High School (Ohio)	Cleveland, Ohio
F	13	Mariah Carson	6 ft 1 in (1.85 m)	RS Fr	Southeastern	Detroit, MI
G	22	Andola Dortch	5 ft 7 in (1.7 m)	Fr	Kenmore High School	Akron, OH
G	23	Jessica Williams	5 ft 8 in (1.73 m)	So	North	Westerville, OH
G/F	24	Sarah Clark	5 ft 11 in (1.8 m)	Jr	Delphos St John's High School; Owens Community College	Delphos, OH
F	32	Melissa Goodall	6 ft 2 in (1.88 m)	Sr	Lexington	Lexinngton, OH
C	33	Yolanda Richardson	6 ft 2 in (1.88 m)	Jr	Start	Toledo, OH
G	35	Haylie Linn	5 ft 11 in (1.8 m)	Jr	Edgewood; Indiana University Bloomington	Madison, WI
C	44	Kyle Baumgartner	6 ft 3 in (1.91 m)	Jr	Hoover	Atlanta, GA
F	50	Brianna Jones	6 ft 2 in (1.88 m)	So	Central Catholic	Toledo, OH

Head coach

- Tricia Cullop (Purdue)

Assistant coach(es)

- Nitra Perry (Mississippi State)
- Todd Mitmesser (Morehead State)

Legend

- (C) Team captain
- (S) Suspended
- (I) Ineligible
- (W) Walk-on
- Injured
- Current redshirt

Roster

== Schedule ==
Date time, TV	Rank^{#}	Opponent^{#}	Result	Record	Site (attendance) city, state
Exhibition
November 4, 2010*; 7:00 pm		Alaska Anchorage	W 63–37		Savage Arena; Toledo, OH
Non-conference regular season
November 12, 2010*; 7:00 pm		St. Francis (PA); Preseason WNIT First Round	W 71–46	1–0	Savage Arena (845); Toledo, OH
November 15, 2010*; 7:00 pm		at Purdue; Preseason WNIT Second Round	L 66–79	1–1	Mackey Arena (8,320); West Lafayette, IN
November 20, 2010*; 12:00 pm		Missouri State; Preseason WNIT Consolation Finals	L 69–73	1–2	Savage Arena (434); Toledo, OH
November 23, 2010*; 7:00 pm		at Cleveland St.	L 50–58	1–3	Wolstein Center (282); Cleveland, OH
November 27, 2010*; 1:00 pm		vs. UMBC; Iona Thanksgiving Classic	W 77–72	2–3	Hynes Athletics Center (833); New Rochelle, NY
November 28, 2010*; 3:30 pm		at Iona; Third Round	W 68–60	3–3	Hynes Athletics Center (742); New Rochelle, NY
November 30, 2010*; 7:00 pm		at Saint Peter's	W 61–33	4–3	Yanitelli Center (473); Jersey City, NJ
December 5, 2010*; 2:00 pm		at Dayton	L 69–102	4–4	UD Arena (710); Dayton, OH
December 10, 2010*; 7:00 pm		Oakland	W 64–36	5–4	Savage Arena (2,484); Toledo, OH
December 12, 2010*; 2:00 pm		Indiana	W 56–52	6–4	Savage Arena (2,981); Toledo, OH
December 19, 2010*; 2:00 pm		UW-Milwaukee	W 71–46	7–4	Savage Arena (2,463); Toledo, OH
December 22, 2010*; 3:00 pm		at Northwestern	L 60–70	7–5	Welsh-Ryan Arena (289); Evanston, IL
January 1, 2011*; 12:00 pm		North Dakota	W 71–55	8–5	Savage Arena (2,311); Toledo, OH
MAC regular season
January 5, 2011; 12:00 pm		Ball State	W 63–46	9–5 (1–0)	Savage Arena (2,421); Toledo, OH
January 8, 2011; 2:00 pm		at Western Michigan	W 63–60 ^{OT}	10–5 (2–0)	University Arena (865); Kalamazoo, MI
January 12, 2011; 7:00 pm		Northern Illinois	W 42–31	11–5 (3–0)	Savage Arena (2,489); Toledo, OH
January 15, 2011; 12:00 pm, SportsTime Ohio		at Eastern Michigan	W 72–56	12–5 (4–0)	George Gervin GameAbove Center (509); Ypsilanti, MI
January 19, 2011; 7:00 pm		Central Michigan	L 74–78	12–6 (4–1)	McGuirk Arena (568); Mount Pleasant, MI
January 22, 2011; 4:30 pm		Buffalo	W 67–53	13–6 (5–1)	Savage Arena (3,254); Toledo, OH
January 26, 2011; 7:00 pm		at Bowling Green	W 66–65	14–6 (6–1)	Anderson Arena (3,315); Bowling Green, OH
January 29, 2011; 12:00 pm		Kent State	W 66–53	15–6 (7–1)	Savage Arena (4,519); Toledo, OH
February 2, 2011; 7:00 pm		at Akron	W 58–49	16–6 (8–1)	James A. Rhodes Arena (630); Akron, OH
February 5, 2011; 12:00 pm, SportsTime Ohio		at Miami (Ohio)	W 76–65	17–6 (9–1)	Millett Hall (531); Oxford, OH
February 12, 2011; 4:30 pm		Ohio	W 68–48	18–6 (10–1)	Savage Arena (3,043); Toledo, OH
February 16, 2011*; 7:00 pm		Western Michigan	W 76–39	19–6 (11–1)	Savage Arena (2,968); Toledo, OH
February 19, 2011; 1:00 pm		at Ball State	W 67–49	20–6 (12–1)	Worthen Arena (1,003); Muncie, IN
February 23, 2011; 7:00 pm		Eastern Michigan	W 65–64	21–6 (13–1)	Savage Arena (2,638); Toledo, OH
February 26, 2011; 4:00 pm		at Northern Illinois	L 53–57	21–7 (13–2)	Convocation Center (739); Dekalb, Il
March 2, 2011; 7:00 pm		Central Michigan	W 85–75	22–7 (14–2)	Savage Arena (3,001); Toledo, OH
MAC Women's Tournament
March 9, 2011; 5:00 pm		vs. Akron; Quarterfinals	W 73–65	23–7	Quicken Loans Arena (2,339); Cleveland, OH
March 11, 2011; 2:30 pm, SportsTime Ohio		vs. Eastern Michigan; Semifinals	L 55–61	23–8	Quicken Loans Arena (1,949); Cleveland, OH
WNIT
March 16, 2011*; 7:00 pm		Delaware; First Round	W 58–55	24–8	Savage Arena (1,247); Toledo, OH
March 19, 2011*; 12:00 pm		Auburn; Second Round	W 67–52	25–8	Savage Arena (1,390); Toledo, OH
March 22, 2011*; 7:00 pm		Alabama; Third Round	W 74–59	26–8	Savage Arena (3,740); Toledo, OH
March 27, 2011; 2:00 pm		Syracuse; Quarterfinals	W 71–68 ^{OT}	27–8	Savage Arena (5,001); Toledo, OH
March 30, 2011*; 8:00 pm, CBSSN		Charlotte; Semifinals	W 83–60	28–8	Savage Arena (7,020); Toledo, OH
April 2, 2011*; 3:00 pm, CBSSN		USC; Championship	W 76–68	29–8	Savage Arena (7,301); Toledo, OH
*Non-conference game. ^{#}Rankings from AP Poll. (#) Tournament seedings in parentheses. All times are in Eastern Time.

Source: ,
