= 2013–14 Butler Bulldogs women's basketball team =

Intercollegiate basketball season

2013–14 Butler Bulldogs women's basketball

WNIT, First Round
- Conference: Big East
- Record: 15–16 (10–8 Big East)
- Head coach: Beth Couture (12th season)
- Assistant coaches: Tisha Hill (4th season); Ashley Hayes (3rd season); Kurt Godlevske (1st season)
- Home arena: Hinkle Fieldhouse

2013–14 Big East Conference women's basketball standings
	Conf.				Overall
Team	W		L	PCT	W		L	PCT
No. 23 DePaul†	15	–	3	.833	29	–	7	.806
St. John's	13	–	5	.722	23	–	11	.676
Creighton	12	–	6	.667	20	–	14	.588
Villanova	12	–	6	.667	23	–	9	.719
Marquette	11	–	7	.611	22	–	11	.667
Butler	10	–	8	.556	15	–	16	.484
Seton Hall	8	–	10	.444	20	–	14	.588
Georgetown	4	–	14	.222	11	–	21	.344
Xavier	3	–	15	.167	8	–	23	.258
Providence	2	–	16	.111	7	–	23	.233
† 2014 Big East Basketball Tournament winner As of March 11, 2014; Rankings from AP poll

The 2013–14 Butler Bulldogs women's basketball team represented Butler University in the 2013–14 NCAA Division I women's basketball season. Their head coach was Beth Couture, serving her 12th year. The Bulldogs played their home games at the Hinkle Fieldhouse, which has a capacity of approximately 10,000. This is Butler's first season competing in the Big East.

== Roster ==
2013–14 Butler Bulldogs women's basketball team
Players
Coaches

Pos.	#	Name	Height	Year	Previous school	Hometown
G/F	22	Ashton Feldhaus	6 ft 2 in (1.88 m)	Fr	Madison Central	Richmond, Kentucky
G	32	Loryn Goodwin	5 ft 9 in (1.75 m)	RS So	Cypress Falls	Houston, Texas
C	50	Sarah Hamm	6 ft 2 in (1.88 m)	Sr	Winchester	Winchester, Indiana
F	3	Haley Howard	5 ft 11 in (1.8 m)	Jr	Whiteland	Whiteland, Indiana
G	2	Blaire Langlois	5 ft 8 in (1.73 m)	So	Carmel	Carmel, Indiana
F	21	Daress McClung	6 ft 0 in (1.83 m)	Sr	Lawrence North (Cincinnati)	Indianapolis, Indiana
G	10	Mandy McDivitt	5 ft 8 in (1.73 m)	Sr	Connersville	Connersville, Indiana
G	23	Lexus Murry	5 ft 7 in (1.7 m)	So	Decatur Central	Indianapolis, Indiana
C	33	Zoe Reichman	6 ft 4 in (1.93 m)	Fr	Blich	Savyon, Israel
G	1	Taylor Schippers	5 ft 8 in (1.73 m)	Jr	Concordia Lutheran	Houston, Texas
C	5	Liz Stratman	6 ft 2 in (1.88 m)	Jr	Heritage Christian	New Palestine, Indiana
G/F	13	Ijeoma Uchendu	6 ft 1 in (1.85 m)	Jr	Oshodi	Lagos, Nigeria
C	24	Olivia Wrencher	6 ft 2 in (1.88 m)	So	Lakota East	West Chester, Ohio

Head coach

- Beth Couture (Erskine)

Assistant coach(es)

- Tisha Hill (Indiana)
- Ashley Hayes (Michigan State)
- Kurt Godlevske (Northern Michigan)

Legend

- (C) Team captain
- (S) Suspended
- (I) Ineligible
- (W) Walk-on
- Injured
- Current redshirt

Roster
Last update: 22 November 2013

Source: 2013-14 Butler Women's Basketball Roster

== Schedule ==
Date time, TV	Rank^{#}	Opponent^{#}	Result	Record	Site (attendance) city, state
Exhibition
Nov. 3*; 2:00 pm		DePauw	W 63–41	–	Hinkle Fieldhouse; Indianapolis, IN
Non-conference regular season
Nov. 8*; 7:00 pm		Cleveland State	W 85–69	1–0	Hinkle Fieldhouse (585); Indianapolis, IN
Nov. 13*; 7:06 pm		at Eastern Michigan	L 76–81	1–1	Convocation Center (289); Ypsilanti, MI
Nov. 16*; 12:00 pm		Saint Mary's	L 86–90	1–2	Hinkle Fieldhouse (582); Indianapolis, IN
Nov. 18*; 7:00 pm		Bowling Green	L 57–61	1–3	Hinkle Fieldhouse (476); Indianapolis, IN
Nov. 23*; 2:00 pm		at Indiana	L 69–84	1–4	Assembly Hall (2,505); Bloomington, IN
Nov. 29*; 8:00 pm		vs. Utah; South Point Thanksgiving Shootout	W 66–54	2–4	South Point Arena; Las Vegas, NV
Nov. 30*; 8:00 pm		vs. Eastern Washington; South Point Thanksgiving Shootout	W 74–51	3–4	South Point Arena (413); Las Vegas, NV
Dec. 7*; 12:00 pm		UIC	L 57–62	3–5	Hinkle Fieldhouse (325); Indianapolis, IN
Dec. 13*; 8:05 pm		at Valparaiso	W 65–50	4–5	The ARC; Valparaiso, IN
Dec. 15*; 2:00 pm		Northern Kentucky	W 53–47	5–5	Hinkle Fieldhouse (624); Indianapolis, IN
Dec. 21*; 1:05 pm		at Indiana State	L 56–62	5–6	Hulman Center; Terre Haute, IN
Big East Conference play
Dec. 28; 6:00 pm		Marquette	L 59–61	5–7 (0–1)	Hinkle Fieldhouse (467); Indianapolis, IN
Jan. 1; 1:00 pm		at Providence	W 68–65	6–7 (1–1)	Alumni Hall (321); Providence, RI
Jan. 4; 12:00 pm		at Seton Hall	W 75–69	7–7 (2–1)	Walsh Gymnasium (373); South Orange, NJ
Jan. 8; 7:00 pm		Villanova	L 48–70	7–8 (2–2)	Hinkle Fieldhouse (266); Indianapolis, IN
Jan. 11; 2:00 pm		at Georgetown	L 79–85	7–9 (2–3)	McDonough Arena (711); Washington, D.C.
Jan. 15; 11:30 am, ESPN3		at St. John's	L 55–58	7–10 (2–4)	Carnesecca Arena (4,068); Queens, NY
Jan. 18; 6:00 pm		Creighton	W 58–52	8–10 (3–4)	Hinkle Fieldhouse (402); Indianapolis, IN
Jan. 25; 12:00 pm		DePaul	L 64–85	8–11 (3–5)	Hinkle Fieldhouse (511); Indianapolis, IN
Jan. 28; 7:00 pm		Providence	W 72–69	9–11 (4–5)	Hinkle Fieldhouse (291); Indianapolis, IN
Feb. 1; 5:00 pm, FS2		at Xavier	W 68–54	10–11 (5–5)	Cintas Center; Cincinnati, OH
Feb. 5; 7:00 pm		St. John's	L 55–58	10–12 (5–6)	Hinkle Fieldhouse (261); Indianapolis, IN
Feb. 8; 5:00 pm		at Marquette	W 74–70	11–12 (6–6)	Al McGuire Center (1,625); Milwaukee, WI
Feb. 12; 7:00 pm		at Villanova	L 46–61	11–13 (6–7)	The Pavilion (451); Villanova, PA
Feb. 15; 2:00 pm		Georgetown	W 67–59	12–13 (7–7)	Hinkle Fieldhouse (1,115); Indianapolis, IN
Feb. 22; 8:00 pm		at DePaul	L 64–97	12–14 (7–8)	McGrath-Phillips Arena (2,821); Chicago, IL
Feb. 25; 7:00 pm		Xavier	W 57–52	13–14 (8–8)	Hinkle Fieldhouse (545); Indianapolis, IN
Mar. 1; 2:00 pm		Seton Hall	W 74–72	14–14 (9–8)	Hinkle Fieldhouse (814); Indianapolis
Mar. 4; 8:05 pm		at Creighton	W 67–59	15–14 (10–8)	D. J. Sokol Arena (1,011); Omaha, NE
Big East Tournament
Mar. 9; 3:30 pm	(6)	vs. (3) Creighton; Quarterfinals	L 52–61	15–15	Allstate Arena (2,172); Rosemont, IL
WNIT
Mar. 20*; 8:00 pm		at South Dakota St. First Round	L 61–78	15–16	Frost Arena (1,812); Brookings, SD
*Non-conference game. ^{#}Rankings from Coaches' Poll. (#) Tournament seedings in parentheses. All times are in Eastern Time..

Source: Butler Bulldogs women's basketball schedule
