= 2010–11 Ohio Bobcats women's basketball team =

Intercollegiate basketball season

2010–11 Ohio Bobcats women's basketball
- Conference: Mid-American Conference
- East Division
- Record: 9–22 (4–12 MAC)
- Head coach: Semeka Randall (3rd season)
- Assistant coach: Skyler Young
- Home arena: Convocation Center

2010–11 Mid-American Conference women's basketball standings
	Conf.				Overall
Team	W		L	PCT	W		L	PCT
Bowling Green †	13	–	3	.813	28	–	4	.875
Kent State	11	–	5	.688	20	–	9	.690
Buffalo	8	–	8	.500	16	–	15	.516
Akron	6	–	10	.375	14	–	16	.467
Ohio	4	–	12	.250	9	–	22	.290
Miami (OH)	3	–	13	.188	11	–	19	.367
West
Toledo	14	–	2	.875	23	–	8	.742
Central Michigan	11	–	5	.688	20	–	10	.667
Eastern Michigan	10	–	6	.625	22	–	12	.647
Northern Illinois	7	–	9	.438	13	–	17	.433
Western Michigan	5	–	11	.313	9	–	21	.300
Ball State	4	–	12	.250	9	–	21	.300
† 2011 MAC tournament winner Rankings from AP poll

The 2010–11 Ohio Bobcats women's basketball team represented Ohio University during the 2010–11 NCAA Division I women's basketball season. The Bobcats, led by third year head coach Semeka Randall, played their home games at the Convocation Center in Athens, Ohio as a member of the Mid-American Conference. They finished the season 9–22 and 4–12 in MAC play.

== Preseason ==
The preseason poll and league awards were announced by the league office on October 27, 2010. Ohio was picked fifth in the MAC East.

=== Preseason women's basketball poll ===
(First place votes in parentheses)

==== East Division ====
1. Bowling Green
2. Kent State
3. Miami
4. Akron
5. Ohio
6. Buffalo

==== West Division ====
1. Toledo
2. Eastern Michigan
3. Central Michigan
4. Ball State
5. Northern Illinois
6. Western Michigan

==== Tournament champs ====
Bowling Green

== Schedule ==
Date time, TV	Rank^{#}	Opponent^{#}	Result	Record	Site (attendance) city, state
Non-conference regular season
Nov 14, 2010*		Louisville	L 47–84	0–1	
Nov 20, 2010*		Memphis	W 62–45	1–1	
Nov 23, 2010*		at Marshall	W 54–52	2–1	
Nov 27, 2010*		at Youngstown State	L 52–60	2–2	
Nov 30, 2010*		at George Washington	L 44–54	2–3	
Dec 4, 2010*		at Chicago State	L 54–67	2–4	
Dec 6, 2010*		Temple	L 48–75	2–5	
Dec 9, 2010*		Wright State	L 57–70	2–6	
Dec 12, 2010*		at George Mason	L 53–69	2–7	
Dec 16, 2010*		Duquesne	L 52–82	2–8	
Dec 19, 2010*		Presbyterian	W 63–57	3–8	
Dec 21, 2010*		Cleveland State	W 57–45	4–8	
Dec 29, 2010*		at UNC Wilmington	L 53–62	4–9	
MAC regular season
Jan 5, 2011		Bowling Green	L 54–66	4–10 (0–1)	
Jan 8, 2011		Akron	L 45–54	4–11 (0–2)	
Jan 12, 2011		Kent State	L 54–55	4–12 (0–3)	
Jan 15, 2011		Buffalo	L 51–65	4–13 (0–4)	
Jan 18, 2011		at Miami (OH)	W 69–56	5–13 (1–4)	
Jan 22, 2011		Western Michigan	W 60–54	6–13 (2–4)	
Jan 26, 2011		at Eastern Michigan	L 40–85	6–14 (2–5)	
Jan 29, 2011		Northern Illinois	L 48–56	6–15 (2–6)	
Feb 2, 2011		at Ball State	W 68–59	7–15 (3–6)	
Feb 5, 2011		Central Michigan	L 64–82	7–16 (3–7)	
Feb 12, 2011		at Toledo	L 48–68	7–17 (3–8)	
Feb 16, 2011		at Bowling Green	L 63–77	7–18 (3–9)	
Feb 19, 2011		at Akron	L 57–59	7–19 (3–10)	
Feb 23, 2011		at Kent State	L 62–68	7–20 (3–11)	
Feb 26, 2011		at Buffalo	L 65–70	7–21 (3–12)	
Mar 2, 2011		Miami (OH)	W 76–47	8–21 (4–12)	
MAC Tournament
Mar 6, 2011		at Northern Illinois	W 72–56	9–21	
Mar 9, 2011		vs. Bowling Green	L 57–66	9–22	
*Non-conference game. ^{#}Rankings from AP Poll. (#) Tournament seedings in parentheses. All times are in Eastern Time.

== Awards and honors ==
=== All-MAC Awards ===
Postseason All-MAC teams
Team	Player	Position	Year
All-MAC Honorable Mention	Tenishia Benson	G	Jr.
All-MAC Freshman team	Shavon Robinson	G	Fr.
