= Big East basketball tournament =

The phrase Big East basketball tournament may refer to:

- Big East men's basketball tournament
- Big East women's basketball tournament
