= 2014 Big East women's basketball tournament =

- Classification: Division I
- Season: 2013–14
- Teams: 10
- Site: McGrath-Phillips Arena; Chicago, IL
- Finals site: Allstate Arena; Rosemont, IL
- Champions: DePaul (1st title)
- Winning coach: Doug Bruno (1st title)
- MVP: Jasmine Penny (DePaul)
- Television: FS1

2013–14 Big East Conference women's basketball standings
	Conf.				Overall
Team	W		L	PCT	W		L	PCT
No. 23 DePaul†	15	–	3	.833	29	–	7	.806
St. John's	13	–	5	.722	23	–	11	.676
Creighton	12	–	6	.667	20	–	14	.588
Villanova	12	–	6	.667	23	–	9	.719
Marquette	11	–	7	.611	22	–	11	.667
Butler	10	–	8	.556	15	–	16	.484
Seton Hall	8	–	10	.444	20	–	14	.588
Georgetown	4	–	14	.222	11	–	21	.344
Xavier	3	–	15	.167	8	–	23	.258
Providence	2	–	16	.111	7	–	23	.233
† 2014 Big East Basketball Tournament winner As of March 11, 2014; Rankings from AP poll

The 2014 Big East women's basketball tournament, officially known as the 2014 Big East championship, was the 35th overall edition of the Big East women's basketball tournament, but the first of the current Big East Conference. It determined the recipient of the conference's automatic bid to the 2014 NCAA tournament.

The 2013 tournament was the last tournament for the Big East in its original form. Following a prolonged period of turnover in the conference membership, culminating in a split of the conference along football lines effective in July 2013, the Big East name was assumed by the seven schools of the original Big East that do not sponsor FBS football (a group colloquially called either the "Basketball 7" or the "Catholic 7"). The new Big East tournament was hosted by DePaul University, with the First round taking place on the school's Chicago campus at McGrath-Phillips Arena while the quarterfinals through the finals took place at Allstate Arena in suburban Rosemont. The semifinals and the championship aired nationwide on Fox Sports 1. The FBS schools of the old Big East retained the original conference structure with a new name, American Athletic Conference.

== Seeds ==
2014 Big East women's basketball tournament seeds and results
Seed	School	Conf.	Over.	Tiebreaker
1	DePaul	15-3	24-6	
2	St. John's	13-5	20-9	
3	Creighton	12-6	18-12	1-1 vs. DePaul
4	Villanova	12-6	22-7	0-2 vs DePaul
5	Marquette	11-7	20-9	
6	Butler	10-8	15-14	
7	Seton Hall	8-10	17-12	
8	Georgetown	4-14	10-20	
9	Xavier	3-15	8-22	
10	Providence	2-16	7-22	
‡ – Big East regular season champions, and tournament No. 1 seed. † – Received a single-bye in the conference tournament. Overall records include all games played in the Big East tournament.

== Schedule ==
Game	Time*	Matchup^{#}	Television	Attendance
First round – Saturday, March 8
1	5:00 PM	#7 Seton Hall vs #10 Providence		
2	7:30 PM	#8 Georgetown vs #9 Xavier		
Quarterfinals – Sunday, March 9
3	1:00 PM	#2 St John's vs Game 1 Winner		
4	3:30 PM	#3 Creighton vs #6 Butler		
5	7:00 PM	#1 DePaul vs Game 2 Winner		
6	9:30 PM	#4 Villanova vs #5 Marquette		
Semifinals – Monday, March 10
7	4:00 PM	#2 St John's vs #3 Creighton	FS1	
8	6:30 PM	#1 DePaul vs #5 Marquette	FS1	
Championship – Tuesday, March 11
9	8:00 PM	#1 DePaul vs #2 St John's	FS1	
*Game Times in ET. #-Rankings denote tournament seed

== Bracket ==
Opening Round; March 8, 2014
8	Georgetown	56
9	Xavier	37
7	Seton Hall	88
10	Providence	79

Quarterfinals; March 9, 2014
1	DePaul	78
8	Georgetown	54
4	Villanova	53
5	Marquette	56
2	St. John's	66
7	Seton Hall	60
3	Creighton	61
6	Butler	52

Semifinals; March 10, 2014
1	DePaul	100
5	Marquette	90
2	St. John's	68
3	Creighton	63^{2OT}

Championship; March 11, 2014
1	DePaul	65
2	St. John's	57
