= Big East Tournament =

Big East tournament or Big East championship may refer to:

- Big East men's basketball tournament, the men's basketball championship
- Big East women's basketball tournament, the women's basketball championship
- Big East baseball tournament, the baseball championship
- Big East Conference football championship
