= 2010–11 Connecticut Huskies women's basketball team =

Intercollegiate basketball season

2010–11 Connecticut Huskies women's basketball

Big East tournament champions Big East regular season champions World Vision Classic champions

NCAA tournament, Final Four
- Conference: Big East Conference (1979–2013)

Ranking
- AP: No. 1
- Record: 36–2 (16–0 Big East)
- Head coach: Geno Auriemma
- Associate head coach: Chris Dailey
- Assistant coaches: Shea Ralph; Marisa Moseley
- Home arena: Harry A. Gampel Pavilion

2010–11 Big East Conference women's basketball standings
	Conf.				Overall
Team	W		L	PCT	W		L	PCT
Connecticut†	16	–	0	1.000	36	–	2	.947
DePaul	13	–	3	.813	29	–	7	.806
Notre Dame	13	–	3	.813	31	–	8	.795
Rutgers	11	–	5	.688	20	–	13	.606
Marquette	10	–	6	.625	24	–	9	.727
Louisville	10	–	6	.625	22	–	13	.629
Syracuse	9	–	7	.563	25	–	10	.714
Georgetown	9	–	7	.563	24	–	11	.686
St. John's	9	–	7	.563	22	–	11	.667
West Virginia	8	–	8	.500	24	–	10	.706
Providence	6	–	10	.375	13	–	16	.448
Pittsburgh	5	–	11	.313	14	–	17	.452
South Florida	3	–	13	.188	12	–	19	.387
Villanova	3	–	13	.188	12	–	19	.387
Cincinnati	2	–	14	.125	9	–	20	.310
Seton Hall	1	–	15	.063	8	–	22	.267
† 2011 Big East Basketball Tournament winner Rankings from AP poll

The 2010–11 Connecticut Huskies women's basketball team represented the University of Connecticut in the 2010–2011 NCAA Division I basketball season. The Huskies were coached by Geno Auriemma, and played their home games at the XL Center in Hartford, Connecticut, and on campus at the Harry A. Gampel Pavilion in Storrs, Connecticut. The Huskies are a member of the Big East Conference and attempted to win their eighth NCAA championship. The UConn team had won the last two national championships, and extended a win streak to an NCAA record 90 consecutive games.

== Offseason ==
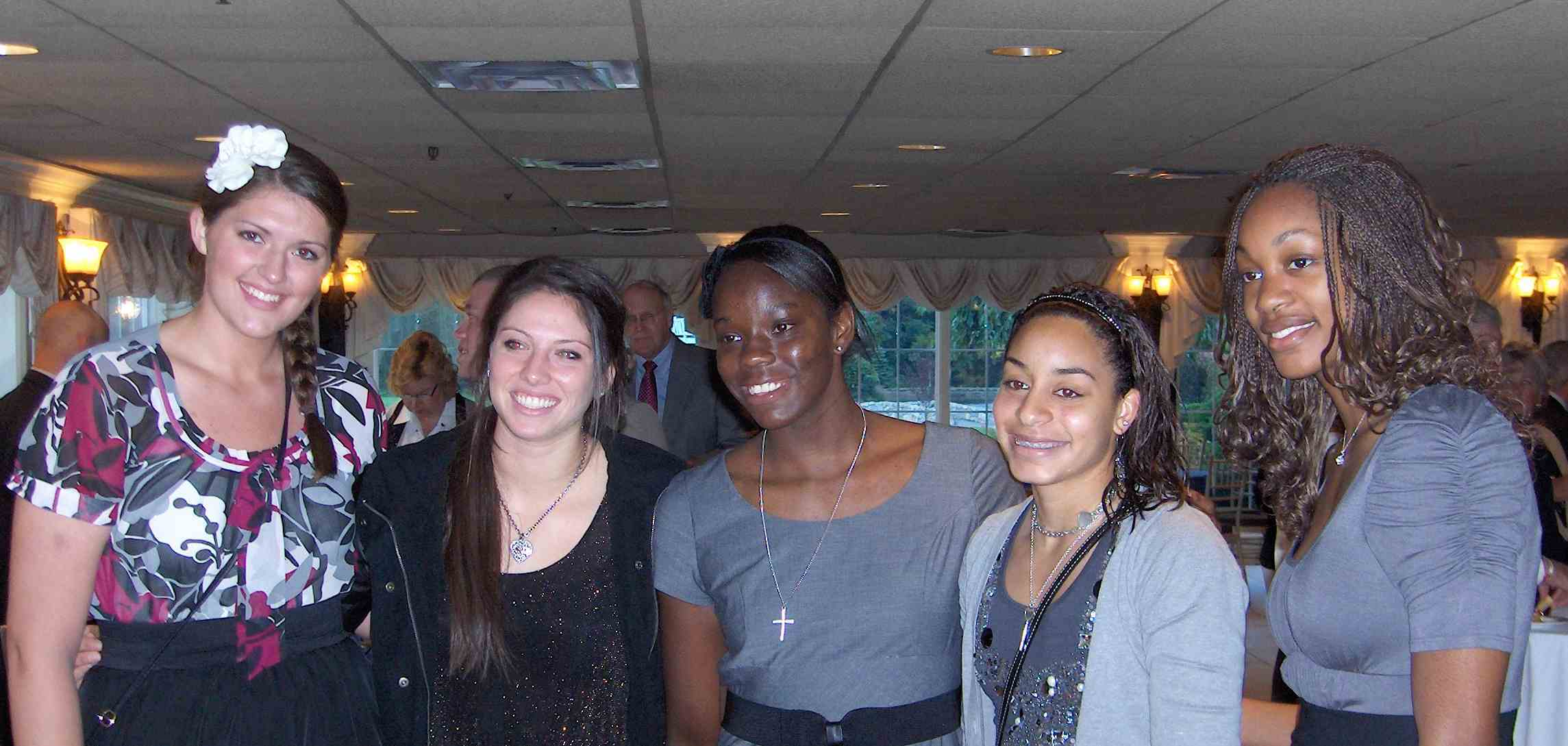
Incoming freshman: Stefanie Dolson, Lauren Engeln, Samarie Walker, Bria Hartley, and Michala Johnson

- May 12: Coach Auriemma, along with Mike Krzyzewski, head coach of the Duke men's basketball program, were the recipients of the "Winged Foot Award" presented annually (since 1996) to the coaches of the Men's and Women's NCAA Division I Basketball Championship.
- June 11: 1995 graduate Rebecca Lobo inducted into the Women's Basketball Hall of Fame
- June 27: Incoming freshmen Bria Hartley and Stefanie Dolson played on the USA Basketball U18 team and helped the team win the gold medal at the 2010 FIBA Americas U18 Championship.
- June 30: Senior Maya Moore was named to the United States women's national basketball team which will compete at the 2010 FIBA World Championship for Women. As part of the preparation, the national team played the WNBA All-stars in the WNBA vs. USA Basketball: The Stars at the Sun Game. Moore's teammates will include former Connecticut Husky players Sue Bird, Diana Taurasi, Tina Charles, Swin Cash and Renee Montgomery. Moore scored 12 points to help the USA team beat the WNBA All Stars.
- August 8: Moore was selected to play in a basketball game organized by Barack Obama to entertain wounded troops. The players invited included some current and former stars: LeBron James, Dwyane Wade, Carmelo Anthony, Bill Russell and Magic Johnson.
- August 12: Caroline Doty to miss season. Doty will undergo surgery to repair a torn ACL in her left knee, and will be out for the season.

== Regular season ==
The Connecticut team opened the year ranked #1 in both the ESPN Coaches poll and the AP Top 25 Poll, following two consecutive undefeated seasons. The votes were not unanimous, with Baylor earning a number one vote in the AP poll, and Baylor, Stanford, and Tennessee earning first place votes in the coaches poll.

=== Roster changes ===
The regular season began with a number of changes, some expected, some not. The expected changes including the graduation of five seniors from the previous squad, and the addition of five new freshmen. The unexpected change was the loss of starting guard Caroline Doty, who suffered an ACL injury in July, and will be out for the entire season.

Jackie Fernandes is one of the seniors who graduated last year and is no longer with the team. Fernandes averaged six minutes a game during the 2009–10 season. She was the high school teammate of Heather Buck, who will be a redshirt, after sitting out one year for development. Kaili McLaren played twelve minutes a game for the Huskies in the previous season, and has moved on to a professional basketball career with Apollon Ptolemaidos in Greece. Meghan Gardler graduated as well, after a career with UConn that saw her minutes increase each year, playing over thirteen minutes a game as a senior. Kalana Greene was a starting guard, playing almost 26 minutes per game and averaging eleven points per game. Greene was the 13th selection in the WNBA draft, where she was selected by and plays for the New York Liberty. The final graduating senior was Tina Charles who was selected as the overall number one draft pick by the Connecticut Sun. Charles won a number of awards, including both Naismith and AP Player of the Year.

Joining the team were five freshmen: Bria Hartley from North Babylon, New York; Stefanie Dolson from Port Jervis, New York; Lauren Engeln from Laguna Hills, California; Michala Johnson from Bellwood Illinois; and Samarie Walker from West Carrolton, Ohio.

=== Pre-season ===
The exhibition games were not competitive, as UConn defeated Franklin Pierce by a score of 112–41 and the Indiana University of Pennsylvania Crimson Hawks by a score of 100–41. Two of the freshman stood out at the IUP game, when Samarie Walker scored 22 points and Bria Hartey scored 18.

=== Non-conference games ===
UConn opened their season against perennial opponent Holy Cross. Uconn prevailed easily, winning by an 80-point margin, 117–37.

The second game was a match up between the top two rated teams in the country. UConn had beaten Baylor in the previous season NCAA semifinal game, but in that game, Baylor center Brittney Griner was a freshman, and faced the senior, AP Player of the year, Tina Charles. This year, Griner would be more experienced, and UConn had replaced the veteran Charles with a freshman, Stefanie Dolson. The game started with a moderate advantage for Baylor, who led by five points early, with scores of 8–3 and 10–5. Then UConn took over and extended the lead, reaching a fifteen-point margin early in the second half 44–29. Baylor did not fold, and went on a 27–4 run to retake the lead, and extend it to eight points. UConn responded, with Bria Hartley scoring eight points in the last four minutes, and held on for a 65–64 victory. The victory extended the UConn winning streak to 80 consecutive games.

Five days later, on November 21, the Huskies traveled to Georgia Tech, a game scheduled so that Maya Moore could play near where she had been a high school star. 7,325 fans showed up at the arena, setting a school record for attendance at a women's basketball game. Moore scored 30 points before coming out of the game to a standing ovation. The game would mark the 81st consecutive victory, tying consecutive wins record for NCAA basketball help by Washington University in St. Louis.

After the conference opener against South Florida, UConn played another perennial non-conference opponent, Sacred Heart University, and won easily, 86–32, to stretch the winning streak to 86 games.

==== World Vision Classic ====
UConn hosted the World Vision Classic over Thanksgiving. In the first of the three games, UConn easily beat Howard 86–25, to set the new record consecutive win streak for NCAA women's basketball at 82 games. UConn then went on to beat the other two opponents in the Classic, Lehigh and LSU

==== Madison Square Garden: record-tying game ====
UConn met tenth-ranked Ohio State in Madison Square Garden as Part of the Maggie Dixon Classic, an annual event in honor of Maggie Dixon, the head coach of the Army team who died at the age of 28. A crowd of 15,232 witnessed UConn win 81–50 to tie the record of 88 consecutive wins set by UCLA in 1974.

=== Conference games ===
UConn opened its conference schedule against with an 80–54 win against USF. After playing Sacred Heart, their second Big East opponent was Marquette, who came to the UConn campus but lost 79–47.

=== Roster ===
2010–11 Connecticut Huskies women's basketball team
Players
Coaches

Pos.	#	Name	Height	Year	Previous school	Hometown
F/C	32	Heather Buck	6 ft 3 in (1.91 m)	RS So	Stonington	Stonington, Conn.
G	30	Lorin Dixon	5 ft 4 in (1.63 m)	Sr	Christ the King	Springfield Gardens, N.Y.
C	31	Stefanie Dolson	6 ft 5 in (1.96 m)	Fr	Minisink Valley	Port Jervis, New York
G	5	Caroline Doty (C) (redshirt)	5 ft 10 in (1.78 m)	RS Jr	Germantown Academy	Doylestown, Pennsylvania.
F	12	Lauren Engeln	5 ft 11 in (1.8 m)	Fr	Laguna Hills	Laguna Hills, California
G	34	Kelly Faris	5 ft 11 in (1.8 m)	So	Heritage Christian	Plainfield, Ind.
G	14	Bria Hartley	5 ft 7 in (1.7 m)	Fr	North Babylon	North Babylon, New York
G	3	Tiffany Hayes	5 ft 10 in (1.78 m)	Jr	Winter Haven	Lakeland, Florida
F	25	Michala Johnson	6 ft 3 in (1.91 m)	Fr	Montini	Bellwood, Illinois
F	23	Maya Moore (C)	6 ft 0 in (1.83 m)	Sr	Collins Hill	Lawrenceville, Georgia
G	31	Samarie Walker (TR^{a})	6 ft 1 in (1.85 m)	Fr	Chaminade-Julienne	West Carrollton, Ohio

Head coach

Geno Auriemma

Assistant coach(es)

Chris Dailey
Shea Ralph
Marisa Moseley

Legend

- (C) Team captain
- (S) Suspended
- (I) Ineligible
- (W) Walk-on
- Injured
- Current redshirt

Roster
Last update: 2013-08-23

^{a} Walker transferred to the University of Kentucky 24 January 2011

=== Schedule ===
The XL Center is the Veterans Memorial Coliseum at XL Center

	Date	Time (EST)	Opponent / Event	Location	UConn points	Opp. points	Record	Streak
	11/4/2010	7:30 p.m.	vs. Franklin Pierce ε	Storrs, Conn. (Gampel Pavilion)	112	41		
	11/10/2010	7:00 p.m.	vs. Indiana Univ. (PA) ε	Hartford, Conn. (XL Center)	100	41		
1	11/14/2010	2:00 p.m.	vs. Holy Cross	Storrs, Conn. (Gampel Pavilion)	117	37	1–0	79
2	11/16/2010	6:00 p.m.	vs. Baylor	Hartford, Conn. (XL Center)	65	64	2–0	80
3	11/21/2010	2:00 p.m.	at Georgia Tech	Atlanta, Ga. Thrillerdome	71	51	3–0	81
4	11/26/2010	7:30 p.m.	vs. Howard	Storrs, Conn. (Gampel Pavilion)	86	25	4–0	82
5	11/27/2010	7:30 p.m.	vs. Lehigh	Storrs, Conn. (Gampel Pavilion)	81	38	5–0	83
6	11/28/2010	4:30 p.m.	vs. LSU	Storrs, Conn. (Gampel Pavilion)	81	51	6–0	84
7	12/2/2010	7:00 p.m.	at USF β	Tampa, Florida (USF Sun Dome)	80	54	7–0	85
8	12/5/2010	1:00 p.m.	vs. Sacred Heart	Hartford, Conn. (XL Center)	86	32	8–0	86
9	12/9/2010	7:30 p.m.	vs. Marquette β	Storrs, Conn. (Gampel Pavilion)	79	47	9–0	87
10	12/19/2010	2:30 p.m.	vs. Ohio State	New York City (Madison Square Garden)	81	50	10–0	88
11	12/21/2010	7:00 p.m.	vs. Florida State	Hartford, Conn. (XL Center)	93	62	11–0	89
12	12/28/2010	10:00 p.m.	at Pacific	Stockton, California Alex G. Spanos Center	85	42	12-0	90
13	12/30/2010	9:00 p.m.	at Stanford	Palo Alto, California (Maples Pavilion)	59	71	12-1	0
14	1/05/2011	7:30 p.m.	vs. Villanova β	Storrs, Conn. (Gampel Pavilion)	81	35	13-1	1
15	1/8/2011	2:00 p.m.	at Notre Dame β	South Bend, Ind. (Purcell Pavilion)	79	76	14-1	2
16	1/12/2011	9:30 p.m.	at St. John's β	New York, N.Y. (Madison Square Garden)	84	52	15-1	3
17	1/15/2011	12:00 p.m.	vs. Louisville β	Hartford, Conn. (XL Center)	78	55	16-1	4
18	1/17/2011	7:00 p.m.	at North Carolina	Chapel Hill, N.C. (Carmichael Auditorium)	83	57	17-1	5
19	1/22/2011	7:30 p.m.	vs. Pittsburgh β	Storrs, Conn. (Gampel Pavilion)	66	46	18-1	6
20	1/26/2011	7:30 p.m.	at Rutgers β	Louis Brown Athletic Center (Piscataway, N.J.)	63	44	19-1	7
21	1/29/2011	2:00 p.m.	at Cincinnati β	Cincinnati, Ohio (Fifth Third Arena)	80	46	20-1	8
22	1/31/2011	7:00 p.m.	vs. Duke	Storrs, Conn. (Gampel Pavilion)	87	51	21-1	9
23	2/5/2011	2:00 p.m.	vs. DePaul β	Storrs, Conn. (Gampel Pavilion)	89	66	22-1	10
24	2/8/2011	7:00 p.m.	at West Virginia β	Morgantown, W. Virginia (WVU Coliseum)	57	51	23-1	11
25	2/12/2011	2:00 p.m.	at Providence β	Providence, R.I. (Dunkin' Donuts Center)	68	38	24-1	12
26	2/14/2011	7:00 p.m.	vs. Oklahoma	Hartford, Conn. (XL Center)	86	45	25-1	13
27	2/19/2011	2:00 p.m.	vs. Notre Dame β	Storrs, Conn. (Gampel Pavilion)	78	57	26-1	14
28	2/22/2011	7:00 p.m.	vs. Seton Hall β	Hartford, Conn. (XL Center)	80	59	27-1	15
29	2/26/2011	3:00 p.m.	at Georgetown β	McDonough Arena (Washington, D.C.)	52	42	28-1	16
30	2/28/2011	7:30 p.m.	vs. Syracuse β	Storrs, Conn. (Gampel Pavilion)	82	47	29-1	17

ε Exhibition

β Big East

== Big East tournament ==
The Big East tournament was held at the XL Center. The opening rounds proceeded largely as expected, with the Villanova Overtime victory over Providence the only upset in the first two rounds. In the third round (quarterfinals), the top seeds also held form.

=== Quarterfinal ===
UConn faced Georgetown, in a surprisingly quiet offensive night for Maya Moore, who scored only six points, although gathered 15 rebounds. She has been held to under ten points only five times in her college career, spanning 147 games so far. Freshman Stefanie Dolson scored 24 points on eight of twelve shooting to lead all scorers. Her 24 points represented the most by a UConn player in their first post-season game, exceeding the 22 points scored by Diana Taurasi in 2001. Georgetown's Sugar Rogers scored eight consecutive points in the second half to cut the UConn lead to eleven, but UConn went on to win 59–43.

=== Semi-final ===
In the semifinals. UConn faced Rutgers, the last Big East team to beat UConn. That loss occurred in 2007. Moore, after scoring only six points in the quarterfinal, bounced back to score 17 points in the first half, and ended up with 22 points for the game. Kelly Faris added 19 points, one short of her career high, to help the Huskies to a 75–51 win over the Scarlet Knights.

=== Big East Championship ===
With sixteen teams in the Big East, and a sixteen-game conference schedule, every team plays every other team once, except for one team which is played twice. For several years, UConn drew Rutgers for two games, but more recently, the UConn schedule includes two games with Notre Dame. The Big East Championship game would be the third match up of the season between these two teams. The first two were won by UConn, but the game at Notre Dame was a close game, resulting in a three-point win by the Huskies.

The meeting would be the first Big East Championship match up of the two teams since the 2001 Big East Championship, a game described by Jeff Goldberg as "the best women's basketball game ever played" in Bird at the Buzzer (ISBN 9780803224117).

Notre Dame jumped out to an early 6–2 lead, but UConn quickly responded and took an 11–8 lead. Then Notre Dame came back, and pushed the score to a seven-point lead, 20–13, forcing UConn coach Auriemma to a rare timeout. The lead went back-and-forth, with UConn holding on to a slim one point lead 32–31 at halftime. In the second half, UConn slowly pushed the margin to twelve points with just under thirteen minutes to go, but Notre Dame chipped away at the lead, and cut it to three points, with just over five minutes remaining. Stefanie Dolson and Maya Moore each made two point baskets over the next three minutes, while Notre Dame only scored four points.The Huskies won the game, 73–64, while using only six players in the rotation.

Moore was voted the Most Outstanding player of the tournament, but some felt that Stefanie Dolson deserved the honors. One of those who felt Dolson should have won was Moore herself, who said, "I wanted to tell Stefanie to go get [the award]". Dolson scored 60 points in the three tournament games, a UConn freshman record.

Date time, TV	Rank^{#}	Opponent^{#}	Result	Record	High points	High rebounds	High assists	Site city, state
6 March 2011; 2:00 pm, ESPNU	No. 1	No. 23 Georgetown; Big East women's basketball tournament	W 59–43	30–1	24 – Stefanie Dolson	15 – Maya Moore	4 – Bria Hartley	XL Center; Hartford, Connecticut
7 March 2011; 6:00 pm, ESPNU	No. 1	Rutgers; Big East women's basketball tournament	W 75–51	31–1	22 – Maya Moore	9 – Stefanie Dolson	6 – Khadijah Rushdan	XL Center; Hartford, Connecticut
8 March 2011; 7:00 pm, ESPN	No. 1	No. 10 Notre Dame; Big East women's basketball tournament	W 73–64	32–1	24 – Stefanie Dolson	10 – Achonwa (ND), Faris (CT)	5 – Skylar Diggins	XL Center; Hartford, Connecticut
*Non-conference game. ^{#}Rankings from AP Poll. (#) Tournament seedings in parentheses. All times are in Eastern Time.

== Player stats ==
Player	Games played	Minutes	Field goals	Three pointers	Free throws	Rebounds	Assists	Blocks	Steals	Points

== Postseason ==
=== NCAA Basketball tournament ===
Connecticut was awarded a bid to host first round games at their campus location in Storrs, Connecticut. The NCAA Selection committee rules require that if a team hosts the first two rounds, and is selected as one of the 64 teams, they must play at their home site. (Teams are not allowed to play at their home site for the third and fourth, or regional rounds.)

=== First Round—Hartford ===
It is not often the opposing team's head coach gets a "long loud ovation" rivaling that of the home team's head coach. But then, it is not often that the visiting coach has her jersey hanging on the area wall where All-American contributors are honored. The game was almost an after-thought. The Hartford Hawks were the sixteen seed in the Philadelphia region, playing the top seeded UConn team on their home court. Hartford, coached by the former UConn point guard Jennifer Rizzotti, had played UConn on six prior occasions, but each of those games were at the downtown Hartford XL Center. This was the first meeting between the two teams on the campus location where Rizzotti helped lead the UConn team to their first national championship. Despite the emotional significance, Rizzotti was focused on her team, more than the location or the game outcome. The Hartford team had struggled early in the season, winning only one of their first ten games. They played much better later in the season, and won the America East conference tournament to earn a bid to the NCAA tournament. Rizzotti took timeouts late in the game to allow her seniors to least their last game to strong ovations. The game was won by UConn 75–39, with balanced scoring by the UConn starters.

=== Second Round—Purdue ===
Purdue sometimes struggled during the season to generate offense, but used defense to win 21 games entering the NCAA tournament second round. Purdue's defense was successful, holding the top-ranked Huskies to 28% shooting and only 28 points in the first half, among the lowest recorded by the team during the year. However, UConn was also a defensively minded team, and held Purdue to only 13 first half points, including a ten-minute stretch with zero points. Purdue more than doubled its output in the second half, scoring 27 points, but UConn's offense also picked up, and the final score was 64-40 in favor of UConn.

This was the final game at the home court for seniors Maya Moore and Lorin Dixon. While Dixon did not score in the game, the shortest player on the floor at 5' 4" had a block for the last play of her game at her home arena. Both Moore and Dixon completed a college career without a single loss at home.

=== Regional Semi-Final—Georgetown ===
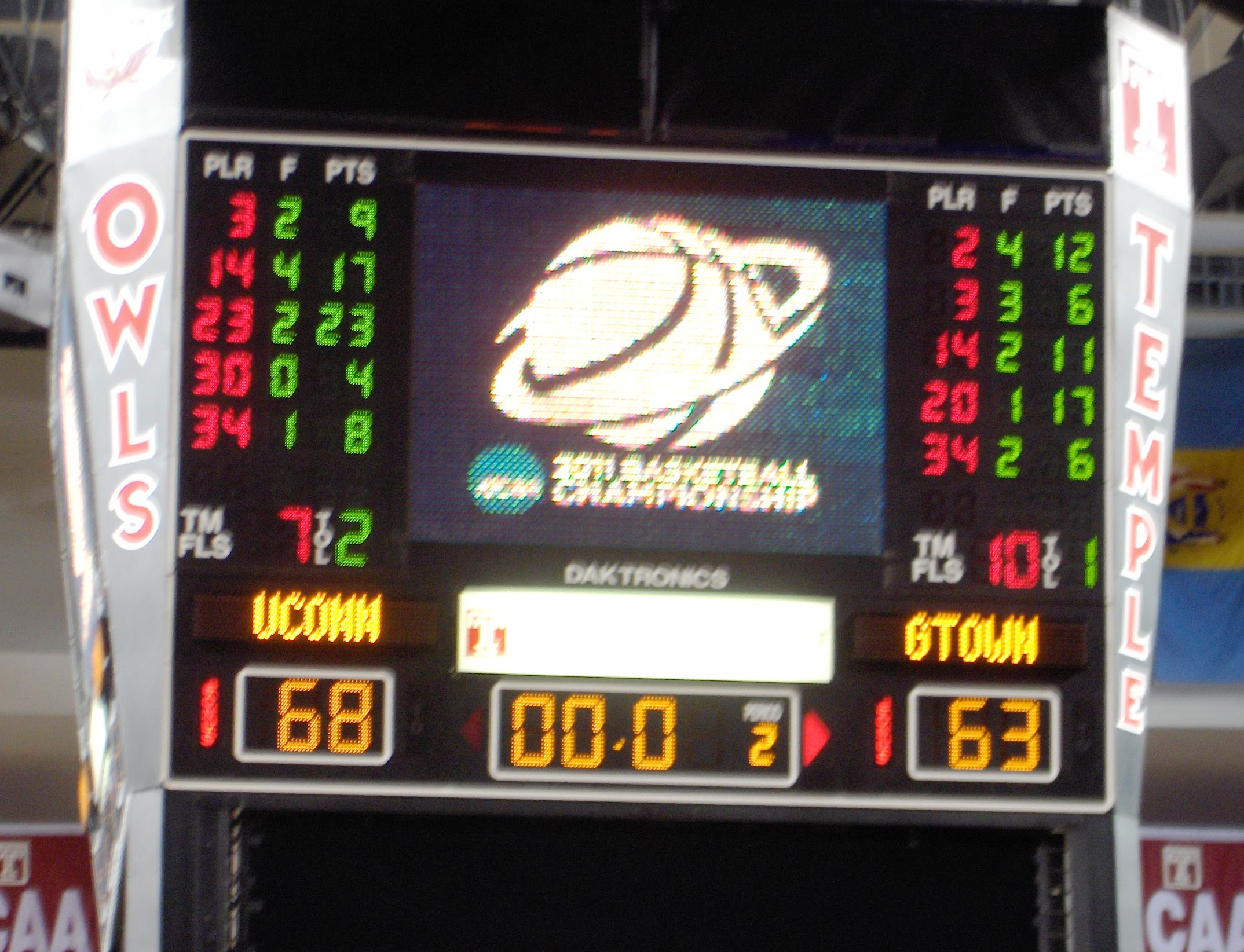
Scoreboard at the conclusion of the 2011 Philadelphia regional semifinal game

Lorin Dixon scored "only" four points, yet her performance earned her accolades from sports writers and coaches. Jeré Longman of The New York Times wrote, "on Sunday, Dixon had the biggest impact". Dixon's coach, Geno Auriemma said, "What Lorin did for us tonight was unbelievably important."

UConn and Georgetown were meeting for the third time this season. UConn won a close, ten point game in Georgetown during the regular season, and met again in the quarterfinals of the Big East tournament. The final margin of that game wasn't as close, but Georgetown held Maya Moore to six points, one of her rare performances with less than double-digit scoring. UConn ended the first half with a rare deficit, and Georgetown build the lead to a seven-point margin 53-46, late in the second half. One of Auriemma's assistants suggested removing the 6' 5" center, Stefanie Dolson, and going with a smaller lineup including Dixon.

After a three pointer by Bria Hartley, Dixon stole the ball and drove the length of the court for a contested layup. On the next possession, Dixon stole the ball again, and passed to Hartley for a layup to tie the score. Less than a minute later, Dixon made a third steal, this time pulling up for a two-point jump shot. After a two-point jump shot by Moore, Dixon made yet another steal. Moore was fouled, and went to the line, completing a 13-0 run by the Huskies, with Dixon central to almost all of the points. Georgetown did not quit, and would score ten more points in the last four plus minutes of the game, but two more baskets by Moore, each assisted by Dixon, helped seal the win for UConn.

=== Regional Final—Duke ===
UConn faced Duke in the regional Final. The teams had met once before during the season, with UConn winning easily 87-51. Duke had only two other losses during the regular season, and ended the regular season winning the ACC regular season and tournament championship. Duke had the second highest RPI in the country.

The game started out in UConn's favor, with UConn jumping out to a 10-2 lead. Unlike the earlier matchup, when UConn extended the lead to 23-2 before Duke scored again, Duke responded. While they were unable to take the lead, the margin was only three points with two and a half minutes to go in the first half. UConn then scored seven straight points, including a basket by Maya Moore as time was expiring to extend the lead to ten points. UConn opened up the second half with a 13-2 run, extended the lead to 29 almost halfway through the second period, and coasted to a 75-40 victory and a place in the Final Four.

With just under four minutes remaining in the game, Moore hit a two-point jumper to give her 28 points for the game, and a total of 3000 for her career, just the seventh player in NCAA division I women's basketball history to reach the 3,000 point plateau. Moore was named the Regional Most Outstanding Player. She was also named to the All-Tournament team, along with teammates Bria Hartley and Lorin Dixon.

=== National semi-final—Notre Dame ===
Connecticut faced Notre Dame in the semifinal game for the fourth time in the season. UConn beat Notre Dame by three points at Notre Dame's home court, then won by 21 points at UConn's Gampel Pavilion. The two teams matched up in the Big East Championship, with UConn winning by nine.

In the first half of the national semi-final, the halftime score was close, but UConn held a six-point lead. In the second half, Skyler Diggins took over, and ended up with 28 points. UConn's Maya Moore tried to win the game for the Huskies, and scored 36 points, including a stretch of 12 consecutive points, but it was not enough, as the Irish scored 46 in the second half to advance to the championship game 72–63.

Date time, TV	Rank^{#}	Opponent^{#}	Result	Record	High points	High rebounds	High assists	Site city, state
20 March 2011; 12:05 pm, ESPN2	No. 1	(16) Hartford; First Round	W 75–39	33–1	12 – Moore, Dolson, Hayes, Hartley	7 – Moore, Dolson	5 – Hayes, Dixon	Gampel Pavilion; Storrs, Connecticut
22 March 2011; 7:05 pm, ESPN	No. 1	(9) Purdue; Second Round	W 64-40	34-1	23 – Hayes	13 – Moore	4 – Hayes	Gampel Pavilion; Storrs, Connecticut
27 March 2011; 12:00 pm, ESPN	No. 1	(5) Georgetown; Sweet Sixteen	W 68-63	35-1	23 – Moore	14 – Moore	6 – Hartley	Liacouras Center; Philadelphia
29 March 2011; 7:00 pm, ESPN	No. 1	(2) Duke; Elite Eight	W 75-40	36-1	28 – Moore	10 – Moore	6 – Faris, Hartley	Liacouras Center; Philadelphia
3 April 2011; 9:30 pm, ESPN	No. 1	(2) Notre Dame; Final Four	L 63-72	36-2	36 – Moore	8 – Moore	5 – Faris	Conseco Fieldhouse; Indianapolis, Indiana
*Non-conference game. ^{#}Rankings from AP Poll. (#) Tournament seedings in parentheses. All times are in Eastern Time.

== Awards and honors ==
=== Team ===
Connecticut set the record for consecutive wins by an NCAA women's basketball team. They set the record for consecutive wins by a Division 1 women's basketball team at 70, set in 2003. They tied the Division I record on 7 March 2010 against Syracuse. then went on to establish a new record two days later against Notre Dame. The NCAA women's basketball consecutive win streak was set by Washington University in 2001. The Washington Bears won 81 consecutive games in a span covering 1998–2001. Connecticut tied that record with their 81st consecutive win by beating Georgia Tech on 26 November 2010, and set a new record five days later with a win over Howard University. Connecticut set the record for most consecutive wins in any NCAA sport after surpassing UCLA men's basketball program with 89 wins straight with a win over Florida State on December 21, 2010.

=== Maya Moore ===
- State Farm Wade Trophy Player of the Year
- AP National Player of the Year
- U.S. Basketball Writers Association's Player of the Year
- ECAC Player of the Year
- AP All-American(unanimous)
- Wooden All-American
- USBWA All-American
- State Farm Coaches' All-American
- Big East Player of the Year
- Big East Scholar-Athlete of the Year
- Big East Championship Most Outstanding Player

=== Tiffany Hayes ===
- All-Big East First Team

=== Bria Hartley ===
- Big East Freshman of the Year
- All-Big East Second Team
- All-Big East Freshman Team

=== Stefanie Dolson ===
- All-Big East Freshman Team

=== Geno Auriemma ===
- AP Coach of the Year
- Big East Coach of the Year

== Team players drafted into the WNBA ==
Round	Pick	Player	WNBA club
1	1	Maya Moore	Minnesota Lynx

== See also ==
- Basketball winning streaks
- 2010–11 Connecticut Huskies men's basketball team
