= 2010–11 Mid-American Conference women's basketball season =

- League: NCAA Division I
- Sport: Basketball
- Teams: 12

Regular season
- Champions: Toledo
- Runners-up: Bowling Green
- Season MVP: Kourtney Brown

Tournament
- Champions: Bowling Green
- Runners-up: Eastern Michigan
- Finals MVP: Lauren Prochaska

Mid-American women's basketball seasons
- ← 2009–10 2011–12 →

2010–11 Mid-American Conference women's basketball standings
	Conf.				Overall
Team	W		L	PCT	W		L	PCT
Bowling Green †	13	–	3	.813	28	–	4	.875
Kent State	11	–	5	.688	20	–	9	.690
Buffalo	8	–	8	.500	16	–	15	.516
Akron	6	–	10	.375	14	–	16	.467
Ohio	4	–	12	.250	9	–	22	.290
Miami (OH)	3	–	13	.188	11	–	19	.367
West
Toledo	14	–	2	.875	23	–	8	.742
Central Michigan	11	–	5	.688	20	–	10	.667
Eastern Michigan	10	–	6	.625	22	–	12	.647
Northern Illinois	7	–	9	.438	13	–	17	.433
Western Michigan	5	–	11	.313	9	–	21	.300
Ball State	4	–	12	.250	9	–	21	.300
† 2011 MAC tournament winner Rankings from AP poll

The 2010–11 Mid-American Conference women's basketball season began with practices in October 2010, followed by the start of the 2010–11 NCAA Division I women's basketball season in November. Conference play began in January 2011 and concluded in March 2011. Toledo won the regular season title with a record of 14–2 by one game over Bowling Green. Kourtney Brown of Buffalo was named MAC player of the year.

Second seeded Bowling Green won the MAC tournament over fifth seeded Eastern Michigan. Lauren Prochaska of Bowling Green was the tournament MVP. Bowling Green lost to Georgia Tech in the first round of the NCAA tournament. Toledo, Central Michigan, Kent State, and Eastern Michigan played in the WNIT. Toledo won the WNIT championship by defeating USC in the final.

== Preseason awards ==
The preseason poll and league awards were announced by the league office on October 27, 2010.

=== Preseason women's basketball poll ===
(First place votes in parentheses)

==== East Division ====
1. Bowling Green
2. Kent State
3. Miami
4. Akron
5. Ohio
6. Buffalo

==== West Division ====
1. Toledo
2. Eastern Michigan
3. Central Michigan
4. Ball State
5. Northern Illinois
6. Western Michigan

==== Tournament champs ====
Bowling Green

=== Honors ===
Honor	Recipient
Preseason All-MAC East	Kara Murphy, Akron
Preseason All-MAC East	Lauren Prochaska, Bowling Green
Preseason All-MAC East	Kourtney Brown, Buffalo
Preseason All-MAC East	Jamilah Humes, Kent State
Preseason All-MAC East	Courtney Osborn, Miami
Preseason All-MAC West	Emily Maggert, Ball State
Preseason All-MAC West	Tavelyn James, Eastern Michigan
Preseason All-MAC West	Marke Freeman, Northern Illinois
Preseason All-MAC West	Naama Shafir, Toledo
Preseason All-MAC West	Miame Giden, Western Michigan

== Postseason ==
=== Postseason awards ===
1. Coach of the Year: Tricia Cullop, Toledo
2. Player of the Year: Kourtney Brown, Buffalo
3. Freshman of the Year: Niki DiGuilio, Central Michigan
4. Defensive Player of the Year: Kourtney Brown, Buffalo
5. Sixth Man of the Year: Jasmine Mushington, Akron and Taylor Johnson, Central Michigan

=== Honors ===
Honor	Recipient
Postseason All-MAC First Team	Rachel Tecca, Akron, Center
Postseason All-MAC First Team	Lauren Prochaska, Bowling Green, Guard
Postseason All-MAC First Team	Kourtney Brown, Buffalo, Post
Postseason All-MAC First Team	Tavelyn James, Eastern Michigan, Guard
Postseason All-MAC First Team	Naama Shafir, Toledo, Guard
Postseason All-MAC Second Team	Kaihla Szunko, Central Michigan, Forward
Postseason All-MAC Second Team	Cassie Schrock, Eastern Michigan, Guard
Postseason All-MAC Second Team	Taisja Jones, Kent State, Forward
Postseason All-MAC Second Team	Jamilah Humes, Kent State, Guard
Postseason All-MAC Second Team	Marke Freeman, Northern Illinois, Guard
Postseason All-MAC Third Team	Emily Maggert, Ball State, Center
Postseason All-MAC Third Team	Tracy Pontius, Bowling Green, Point Guard
Postseason All-MAC Third Team	Shonda Long, Central Michigan, Guard
Postseason All-MAC Third Team	Courtney Osborn, Miami, Point Guard
Postseason All-MAC Third Team	Melissa Goodall, Toledo, Forward
Postseason All-MAC Honorable Mention	Kara Murphy, Akron, Guard
Postseason All-MAC Honorable Mention	Brandie Baker, Central Michigan, Guard
Postseason All-MAC Honorable Mention	Kirsten Olowinski, Miami, Forward
Postseason All-MAC Honorable Mention	Tenishia Benson, Ohio, Guard
Postseason All-MAC Honorable Mention	Ebony Cleary, Western Michigan, Post
All-MAC Freshman Team	Carly Young, Akron, Forward
All-MAC Freshman Team	Niki DiGuilio, Central Michigan, Guard
All-MAC Freshman Team	Taylor Johnson, Central Michigan, Forward
All-MAC Freshman Team	Shavon Robinson, Ohio, Guard
All-MAC Freshman Team	Andola Dortch, Toledo, Guard

== See also ==
2010–11 Mid-American Conference men's basketball season
