= 2008 Women's National Invitation Tournament =

College basketball postseason tournament

- Teams: 48
- Finals site: Breslin Student Events Center, East Lansing, Michigan
- Champions: Marquette (1st title)
- Runner-up: Michigan State (1st title game)
- Winning coach: Terri Mitchell (1st title)
- MVP: Krystal Ellis (Marquette)
- Attendance: 7,818 (championship game)

The 2008 Women's National Invitation Tournament (WNIT) was a single-elimination tournament of 48 National Collegiate Athletic Association (NCAA) Division I teams that did not participate in the 2008 NCAA Division I women's basketball tournament. The 40th annual tournament was played from March 19, 2008, to April 5, 2008, entirely on campus sites. The highest ranked team in each conference that did not receive a bid to the NCAA Tournament received an automatic bid to this tournament. The remaining slots were filled by the WNIT Selection Committee. Marquette defeated Michigan State, 81–66, to win the tournament.

== Seeding ==
Teams are not seeded in the WNIT. Rather, teams are placed into one of three tiers. Teams in the upper tier are spread around the bracket as best as possible, although not every upper tier team receives a first round bye. Lower tier and middle tier teams tend to meet in the first round, while upper tier teams will usually play winners of first-round games in the second round. The organizers attempt to bracket the first two rounds based on geography. The location of games is determined in part by seed, but also by facility availability and other factors.

== Bracket ==
=== Section 1 ===
Round 1 March 19–22
Prairie View A&M	83
Texas State*	84
Idaho State	54
Boise State*	77
UC Davis	60
Gonzaga*	81
American	52
Villanova*	53

Round 2 March 22–25
Texas Tech*	82
Texas State	49
TCU*	85
Boise State	56
Colorado*	82
Gonzaga	68
Wisconsin*	54
Villanova	60

Round 3 March 26–28
Texas Tech*	74
TCU	81
Colorado*	64
Villanova	58

Quarterfinals; March 29–31
TCU	90
Colorado*	96†

Note: Asterisk denotes home team. † denotes overtime.

=== Section 2 ===
Round 1 March 19–22
Creighton	76
South Dakota State*	69
Wisconsin-Green Bay	56
Drake*	65
Western Carolina	69
Middle Tennessee*	104
Radford	58
James Madison*	80

Round 2 March 21–25
Marquette*	75†
Creighton	69
Illinois*	48
Drake	44
Kentucky*	68†
Middle Tennessee	66
Indiana*	81
James Madison	86†

Round 3 March 26–28
Marquette*	72
Illinois	64
Kentucky*	84
James Madison	76

Quarterfinals; March 29–31
Marquette	69
Kentucky*	64

Note: Asterisk denotes home team. † denotes overtime.

=== Section 3 ===
Round 1 March 19–22
VCU	80
Charlotte*	67
Arkansas-Little Rock	57
Southern Miss*	67
Southeast Missouri State	58
Evansville*	60
Dayton	52
Bowling Green*	64

Round 2 March 22–25
Michigan*	75
VCU	57
Mississippi State	61
Southern Miss*	62
Kansas*	82
Evansville	60
Michigan State*	74
Bowling Green	66

Round 3 March 26–28
Michigan*	59
Southern Miss	45
Kansas	54
Michigan State*	58

Quarterfinals; March 29–31
Michigan	40
Michigan State*	45†

Note: Asterisk denotes home team. † denotes overtime.

=== Section 4 ===
Round 1 March 19–22
Iona	71
Quinnipiac*	59
Dartmouth	50
Vermont*	69
North Carolina A&T	74
South Carolina*	102
South Florida	65
Florida Gulf Coast*	67

Round 2 March 22–25
St. John's*	65
Iona	59
Boston College*	76
Vermont	64
NC State*	72
South Carolina	69
Florida*	60
Florida Gulf Coast	55

Round 3 March 26–28
St. John's*	65
Boston College	56
NC State*	80
Florida	55

Quarterfinals; March 29–31
St. John's	61
NC State*	63

Note: Asterisk denotes home team

=== Semifinals and finals ===
Semifinals; April 2
Colorado*	72
Marquette	86
Michigan State*	58
NC State	57

Finals; April 5
Marquette	81
Michigan State*	66

Note: Asterisk denotes home team

== All-tournament team ==
- Krystal Ellis, Marquette (MVP)
- Angel Robinson, Marquette
- Allyssa DeHaan, Michigan State
- Kalisha Keane, Michigan State
- Khadijah Washington, NC State
- Jackie McFarland, Colorado

== See also ==
- 2008 National Invitation Tournament
