= Big East women's basketball tournament =

Women's basketball conference championship

- Conference basketball championship
- Big East Conference logo
- Sport: College basketball
- Conference: Big East Conference
- Number of teams: 11 (from 2021)
- Format: Single-elimination tournament
- Current stadium: Mohegan Sun Arena
- Current location: Uncasville, Connecticut
- Played: 1983–present
- Last contest: 2026
- Current champion: UConn Huskies
- Most championships: UConn Huskies (24)
- Official website: BigEast.com Women's Basketball

Host stadiums
- Mohegan Sun Arena

Host locations
- Uncasville, Connecticut

2009 Tournament logo.

The Big East women's basketball tournament is a conference championship tournament in women's basketball. It was first held in 1983, at the end of the 1982–83 college basketball season that was the first in which the Big East Conference sponsored women's basketball. Following the 2013 split of the original Big East along football lines, the women's basketball history of the original conference has been maintained by the non-football league that assumed the Big East name. The tournament determines the conference's champion, which receives an automatic bid to the NCAA tournament.

From 2004 through 2013, the tournament was held in the Veterans Memorial Coliseum at the XL Center (formerly known as the Hartford Civic Center). The first three tournaments after the relaunch of the Big East in 2013 were hosted by DePaul University. In 2014, opening-round games were played at McGrath–Phillips Arena on the school's Chicago campus and all other games played at Allstate Arena in suburban Rosemont. All games in the 2015 tournament were held at Allstate Arena, and all 2016 tournament games were held at McGrath–Phillips Arena. The 2017 tournament was the first since the relaunch to be held outside the Chicago area, with all games being played at Al McGuire Center on the Marquette University campus in Milwaukee. From 2018 until 2020, the tournament was held at Wintrust Arena at the McCormick Place convention center on Chicago’s Near South Side.

Starting in 2009, the tournament expanded to include all 16 of the conference's teams at that time. The teams finishing 9 through 16 in the regular season standings played first round games, while teams 5 through 8 receive a bye to the second round. The top 4 teams during the regular season receive a double-bye to the quarterfinals. The 2013 tournament, the final one under the original Big East structure, saw 15 teams participate, following West Virginia's 2012 move to the Big 12 Conference. The tournament now features all 11 members of the reconfigured conference.

In June 2020, it was reported that the tournament will return to Connecticut at the Mohegan Sun Arena moving forward with the return of UConn.

== History of the tournament finals ==
Year	(Seed) Champion	Score	(Seed) Runner-up	Location
1983	(2) St. John's	74–63	(1) Providence	Alumni Hall (Providence, Rhode Island)
1984	(3) St. John's	66–46	(4) Seton Hall	Alumni Hall (now Carnesecca Arena) (Queens, New York)
1985	(5) Syracuse	57–56	(2) Villanova	Manley Field House (Syracuse NY)
1986	(2) Villanova	71–60	(1) Providence	Roberts Center (Chestnut Hill, Massachusetts)
1987	(1) Villanova	60–45	(6) Boston College	The Pavilion (Villanova, Pennsylvania)
1988	(3) St. John's	74–72 OT	(1) Syracuse	Fitzgerald Field House (Pittsburgh, Pennsylvania)
1989	(1) UConn (Note: Athletically branded as "UConn" since 2013–14.)	84–65	(3) Providence	Walsh Gymnasium (South Orange, New Jersey)
1990	(2) Providence	82–61	(1) Connecticut	Gampel Pavilion (Storrs, Connecticut)
1991	(1) Connecticut	79–74	(2) Providence	McDonough Gymnasium (Washington, D.C.)
1992	(1) Miami (FL)	56–47	(2) Connecticut	Gampel Pavilion (Storrs, Connecticut)
1993	(1) Miami (FL)	77–56	(7) Providence	Alumni Hall (Providence, Rhode Island)
1994	(1) Connecticut	77–51	(2) Seton Hall	Gampel Pavilion (Storrs, Connecticut)
1995	(1) Connecticut	85–49	(3) Seton Hall	Walsh Gymnasium (South Orange, New Jersey)
1996	(1) Connecticut	71–54	(3) Notre Dame	Gampel Pavilion (Storrs, Connecticut)
1997	(1) Connecticut	86–77	(3) Notre Dame	Gampel Pavilion (Storrs, Connecticut)
1998	(1) Connecticut	67–58	(2) Rutgers	Louis Brown Athletic Center (The RAC) (Piscataway, New Jersey)
1999	(1) Connecticut	96–75	(3) Notre Dame	Louis Brown Athletic Center (The RAC) (Piscataway, New Jersey)
2000	(1) Connecticut	79–59	(3) Rutgers	Gampel Pavilion (Storrs, Connecticut)
2001	(2) Connecticut	78–76 (Note: See also Bird at the Buzzer, a book focusing on this specific game.)	(1) Notre Dame	Gampel Pavilion (Storrs, Connecticut)
2002	(1) Connecticut	96–54	(3) Boston College	Louis Brown Athletic Center (The RAC) (Piscataway, New Jersey)
2003	(3) Villanova	52–48	(1) Connecticut	Louis Brown Athletic Center (The RAC) (Piscataway, New Jersey)
2004	(5) Boston College	75–57	(7) Rutgers	Hartford Civic Center (Hartford, Connecticut)
2005	(3) Connecticut	67–51	(1) Rutgers	Hartford Civic Center (Hartford, Connecticut)
2006	(2) Connecticut	50–44	(12) West Virginia	Hartford Civic Center (Hartford, Connecticut)
2007	(2) Rutgers	55–47	(1) Connecticut	Hartford Civic Center (Hartford, Connecticut)
2008	(1) Connecticut	65–59	(7) Louisville	XL Center (Hartford, Connecticut)
2009	(1) Connecticut	75–36	(2) Louisville	XL Center (Hartford, Connecticut)
2010	(1) Connecticut	60–32	(2) West Virginia	XL Center (Hartford, Connecticut)
2011	(1) Connecticut	73–64	(3) Notre Dame	XL Center (Hartford, Connecticut)
2012	(3) Connecticut	63–54	(1) Notre Dame	XL Center (Hartford, Connecticut)
2013	(2) Notre Dame	61–59	(3) Connecticut	XL Center (Hartford, Connecticut)
2014	(1) DePaul	65–57	(2) St. John's	Allstate Arena (Rosemont, Illinois) (Opening round: McGrath–Phillips Arena, Chicago)
2015	(2) DePaul	78–68	(1) Seton Hall	Allstate Arena (Rosemont, Illinois)
2016	(4) St. John's	50–37	(7) Creighton	McGrath–Phillips Arena (Chicago)
2017	(3) Marquette	86–78	(1) DePaul	Al McGuire Center (Milwaukee)
2018	(2) DePaul	98–63	(1) Marquette	Wintrust Arena (Chicago)
2019	(2) DePaul	74–73	(1) Marquette	Wintrust Arena (Chicago)
2020	(1) DePaul	88–74	(2) Marquette	Wintrust Arena (Chicago)
2021	(1) UConn	73–39	(2) Marquette	Mohegan Sun Arena (Uncasville, Connecticut)
2022	(1) UConn	70–40	(2) Villanova	Mohegan Sun Arena (Uncasville, Connecticut)
2023	(1) UConn	67–56	(2) Villanova	Mohegan Sun Arena (Uncasville, Connecticut)
2024	(1) UConn	78–42	(6) Georgetown	Mohegan Sun Arena (Uncasville, Connecticut)
2025	(1) UConn	70–50	(2) Creighton	Mohegan Sun Arena (Uncasville, Connecticut)
2026	(1) UConn	90–51	(2) Villanova	Mohegan Sun Arena (Uncasville, Connecticut)
2027				Mohegan Sun Arena (Uncasville, Connecticut)
2028				Mohegan Sun Arena (Uncasville, Connecticut)
2029				Mohegan Sun Arena (Uncasville, Connecticut)

== Performance by school ==
Club	Winners	Winning years
UConn (Note: Following the 2013 split of the original Big East, Connecticut and Rutgers remained in the football-sponsoring portion now known as the American Athletic Conference.) (Note: Connecticut, which changed its official athletic brand to "UConn" in 2013–14, joined the current Big East in 2020.)	24	1989, 1991, 1994, 1995, 1996, 1997, 1998, 1999, 2000, 2001, 2002, 2005, 2006, 2008, 2009, 2010, 2011, 2012, 2021, 2022, 2023, 2024, 2025, 2026
DePaul	5	2014, 2015, 2018, 2019, 2020
St. John's	4	1983, 1984, 1988, 2016
Villanova	3	1986, 1987, 2003
Miami (FL) (Note: Miami left for the Atlantic Coast Conference (ACC) in 2004.)	2	1992, 1993
Syracuse (Note: Notre Dame and Syracuse left for the ACC in 2013.)	1	1985
Providence	1	1990
Boston College (Note: Boston College left for the ACC in 2005.)	1	2004
Rutgers	1	2007
Notre Dame	1	2013
Marquette	1	2017
TOTAL	42	

Among current schools, Butler, Creighton, Seton Hall, Georgetown, and Xavier have never won the tournament.

== Most Outstanding Player ==
Year	Most Outstanding Player	School
1983	Debbie Beckford	St. John's
1984	Anne Marie McNamee	St. John's
1985	Janice Long	Syracuse
1986	Shelly Pennefather	Villanova
1987	Shelly Pennefather (2)	Villanova
1988	Sabrina Johnson	St. John's
1989	Kerry Bascom	Connecticut
1990	Andrea Mangum	Providence
1991	Meghan Pattyson	Connecticut
1992	Frances Savage	Miami
1993	Vicki Plowden	Miami
1994	Rebecca Lobo	Connecticut
1995	Kara Wolters	Connecticut
1996	Kara Wolters (2)	Connecticut
1997	Nykesha Sales	Connecticut
1998	Rita Williams	Connecticut
1999	Shea Ralph	Connecticut
2000	Tamika Williams	Connecticut
2001	Diana Taurasi	Connecticut
2002	Asjha Jones	Connecticut
2003	Trish Juhline	Villanova
2004	Jessalyn Deveny	Boston College
2005	Barbara Turner	Connecticut
2006	Ann Strother	Connecticut
2007	Matee Ajavon	Rutgers
2008	Charde Houston	Connecticut
2009	Maya Moore	Connecticut
2010	Kalana Greene	Connecticut
2011	Maya Moore (2)	Connecticut
2012	Kaleena Mosqueda-Lewis	Connecticut
2013	Kayla McBride	Notre Dame
2014	Jasmine Penny	DePaul
2015	Megan Podkowa	DePaul
2016	Aliyyah Handford	St. John's
2017	Amani Wilborn	Marquette
2018	Amarah Coleman	DePaul
2019	Chante Stonewall	DePaul
2020	Lexi Held	DePaul
2021	Paige Bueckers	UConn
2022	Christyn Williams	UConn
2023	Aaliyah Edwards	UConn
2024	Paige Bueckers (2)	UConn
2025	Paige Bueckers (3)	UConn
2026	Sarah Strong	UConn

Years	Title of Award
1983–1993	Most Valuable Player
1994–1997	Most Outstanding Performer
1998–present	Most Outstanding Player
