= 2011 MAC women's basketball tournament =

- Classification: Division I
- Teams: 12
- Site: Quicken Loans Arena; Cleveland, Ohio
- Champions: Bowling Green
- Winning coach: Curt Miller
- MVP: Lauren Prochaska (Bowling Green)
- MAC women's basketball tournaments

2010–11 Mid-American Conference women's basketball standings
	Conf.				Overall
Team	W		L	PCT	W		L	PCT
Bowling Green †	13	–	3	.813	28	–	4	.875
Kent State	11	–	5	.688	20	–	9	.690
Buffalo	8	–	8	.500	16	–	15	.516
Akron	6	–	10	.375	14	–	16	.467
Ohio	4	–	12	.250	9	–	22	.290
Miami (OH)	3	–	13	.188	11	–	19	.367
West
Toledo	14	–	2	.875	23	–	8	.742
Central Michigan	11	–	5	.688	20	–	10	.667
Eastern Michigan	10	–	6	.625	22	–	12	.647
Northern Illinois	7	–	9	.438	13	–	17	.433
Western Michigan	5	–	11	.313	9	–	21	.300
Ball State	4	–	12	.250	9	–	21	.300
† 2011 MAC tournament winner Rankings from AP poll

The 2011 Mid-American Conference women's basketball tournament was the post-season basketball tournament for the Mid-American Conference (MAC) 2010–11 college basketball season. The 2011 tournament was held March 5–12, 2011. Second seeded Bowling Green won the championship over fifth seeded Eastern Michigan. Lauren Prochaska of Bowling Green was the MVP.

== Format ==
The top four seeds received byes into the quarterfinals. The winners of each division were awarded the #1 and #2 seeds. The team with the best record of the two receives the #1 seed. First round games will be played on campus sites at the higher seed. The remaining rounds were held at Quicken Loans Arena.

== Seeds ==
Seed	School	Conference record	Division
1†	Toledo	14–2	West
2†	Bowling Green	13–3	East
3†	Central Michigan	11–5	West
4†	Kent State	11–5	East
5	Eastern Michigan	10–6	West
6	Buffalo	8–8	East
7	Northern Illinois	7–9	West
8	Akron	6–10	East
9	Western Michigan	5–11	West
10	Ohio	4–12	East
11	Ball State	4–12	West
12	Miami	3–13	East
† – Received a Bye to quarterfinals. Overall record are as of the end of the regular season.

== Bracket ==
First round Campus sites March 5
8	Akron	76
9	Western Michigan	65
5	Eastern Michigan	82
12	Miami	74
7	Northern Illinois	56
10	Ohio	72
6	Buffalo	82
11	Ball State	73

Quarterfinals; Quicken Loans Arena; March 9
1	Toledo	73
8	Akron	65
4	Kent State	65
5	Eastern Michigan	69
2	Bowling Green	66
10	Ohio	57
3	Central Michigan	90
6	Buffalo	69

Semifinals; Quicken Loans Arena; March 11
1	Toledo	55
5	Eastern Michigan	61
2	Bowling Green	80
3	Central Michigan	72

Championship game Quicken Loans Arena; March 12
5	Eastern Michigan	46
2	Bowling Green	51

== All-Tournament Team ==
Tournament MVP – Lauren Prochaska, Bowling Green

Player	Team
Melissa Goodall	Toledo
Tavelyn James	Eastern Michigan
Cassie Schrock	Eastern Michigan
Tracy Pontius	Bowling Green
Lauren Prochaska	Bowling Green
