= Terri Mitchell =

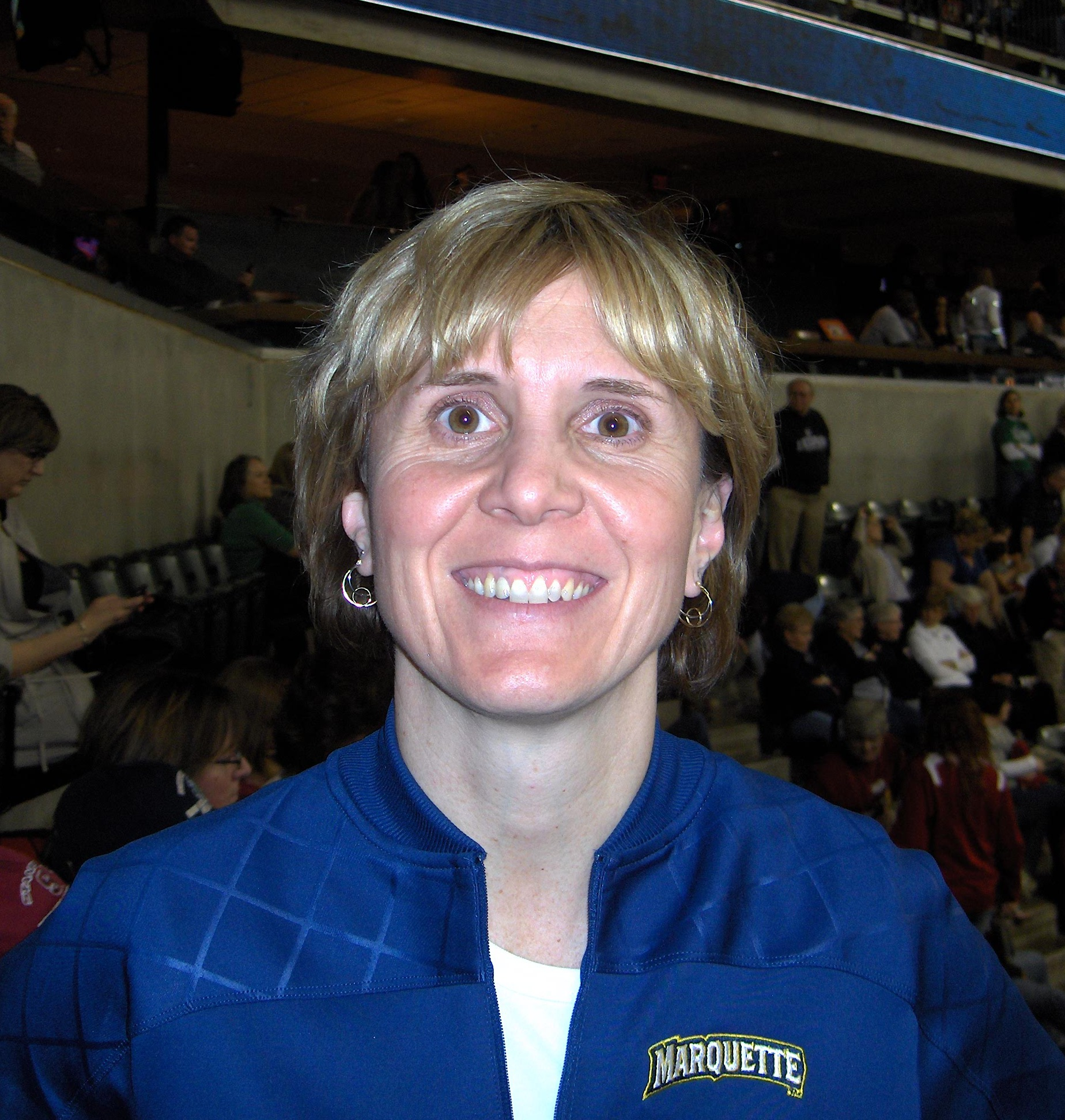

Current position
- Title: Assistant head coach
- Team: Pittsburgh
- Conference: ACC

Biographical details
- Born: June 13, 1967 (age 59)

Coaching career (HC unless noted)
- 1996–2014: Marquette
- 2018–2023: Pittsburgh (asst.)

Head coaching record
- Overall: 348–215
Medal record
Women's basketball
Assistant Coach for United States
FIBA Americas Under-18 Championship
Gold medal – first place	2008 Buenos Aires, Argentina	Team competition

Terri Mitchell (born June 13, 1967) is a former women's college basketball coach. She most recently served as the associate head coach at the University of Pittsburgh. Prior to her time at Pitt, she was the head women's basketball coach at Marquette University. During her tenure, she guided the Golden Eagles to a 348–215 record in 18 seasons. She is the school's all time winningest women's basketball coach, and has taken her teams to postseason play several times. Her teams earned seven straight postseason appearances between 2002 and 2009, including a WNIT championship in 2007. She is the fourth coach in school history.

In her first year, she implemented a transformation, as the team went 21–10, one year after they went 8–20. She has also coached her team to eight 20 win seasons. During the 2006–07 season, she led the Eagles to a 26–7 record, including Top 25 action for a good portion of the season. The Golden Eagles finished Big East play at 12–4, tied for second place, as Mitchell was named Big East Conference Coach of the year. She played college basketball at Duquesne University.

Mitchell announced her resignation on April 9, 2014. On May 9, 2018, she was announced as an associate head coach for the Pittsburgh Panthers women's basketball team. She was at Pitt through the 2023 season.

== Coaching record ==
Record table
Season	Team	Overall	Conference	Standing	Postseason
Marquette Golden Eagles (Conference USA) (1996–2005)
1996–97	Marquette	21–10	10–4	T-4th	NCAA Second Round
1997–98	Marquette	22–7	13–3	2nd	NCAA First Round
1998–99	Marquette	21–8	12–4	T-1st	NCAA First Round
1999–00	Marquette	22–7	14–2	1st	NCAA First Round
2000–01	Marquette	13–16	8–8	T-7th	
2001–02	Marquette	14–14	7–7	T-7th	
2002–03	Marquette	16–14	6–8	T-7th	WNIT Second Round
2003–04	Marquette	22–10	9–5	T-5th	NCAA Second Round
2004–05	Marquette	18–12	8–6	7th	WNIT First Round
Marquette Golden Eagles (Big East) (2005–2014)
2005–06	Marquette	22–11	9–7	T-6th	WNIT Runner-Up
2006–07	Marquette	26–7	12–4	T-2nd	NCAA Second Round
2007–08	Marquette	21–14	8–8	T-8th	WNIT Champion
2008–09	Marquette	17–16	7–9	T-9th	WNIT Second Round
2009–10	Marquette	17–16	6–10	T-10th	WNIT Second Round
2010–11	Marquette	24–9	10–6	T-5th	NCAA Second Round
2011–12	Marquette	14–17	4–12	14th	
2012–13	Marquette	16–16	7–9	T-9th	WNIT First Round
2013–14	Marquette	22–11	11–7	T-4th	WNIT Second Round
Marquette:		348–215 (.618)	151–112 (.574)		
Total:		348–215 (.618)			
National champion Postseason invitational champion Conference regular season champion Conference regular season and conference tournament champion Division regular season champion Division regular season and conference tournament champion Conference tournament champion
