= 2010–11 Notre Dame Fighting Irish women's basketball team =

Intercollegiate basketball season

2010–11 Notre Dame Fighting Irish women's basketball

Big East Runners Up

NCAA women's Division I tournament, National Runner-Up
- Conference: Big East Conference (1979–2013)
- Record: 31–7 (13–3 Big East)
- Head coach: Muffet McGraw
- Home arena: Edmund P. Joyce Center

2010–11 Big East Conference women's basketball standings
	Conf.				Overall
Team	W		L	PCT	W		L	PCT
Connecticut†	16	–	0	1.000	36	–	2	.947
DePaul	13	–	3	.813	29	–	7	.806
Notre Dame	13	–	3	.813	31	–	8	.795
Rutgers	11	–	5	.688	20	–	13	.606
Marquette	10	–	6	.625	24	–	9	.727
Louisville	10	–	6	.625	22	–	13	.629
Syracuse	9	–	7	.563	25	–	10	.714
Georgetown	9	–	7	.563	24	–	11	.686
St. John's	9	–	7	.563	22	–	11	.667
West Virginia	8	–	8	.500	24	–	10	.706
Providence	6	–	10	.375	13	–	16	.448
Pittsburgh	5	–	11	.313	14	–	17	.452
South Florida	3	–	13	.188	12	–	19	.387
Villanova	3	–	13	.188	12	–	19	.387
Cincinnati	2	–	14	.125	9	–	20	.310
Seton Hall	1	–	15	.063	8	–	22	.267
† 2011 Big East Basketball Tournament winner Rankings from AP poll

The 2010–11 Notre Dame Fighting Irish women's basketball team represented the University of Notre Dame in the 2010–2011 NCAA Division I women's basketball season. The Irish, coached by Muffet McGraw, play their home games at the Edmund P. Joyce Center in South Bend, Indiana. The Fighting Irish, members of the Big East Conference, finished runners-up in the Big East regular season and conference tournament, and also in the NCAA tournament.

== 2011 NCAA Tournament ==
In the 2011 NCAA Division I women's basketball tournament, Notre Dame advanced through the rounds, beating two #1 seeds—the Tennessee Lady Volunteers and UConn Huskies—en route to the final. In so doing, they became the first team ever to defeat Tennessee and UConn in the same NCAA women's tournament. The Irish lost to Texas A&M in the national title game.
