= 2013–14 DePaul Blue Demons women's basketball team =

Intercollegiate basketball season

2013–14 DePaul Blue Demons women's basketball
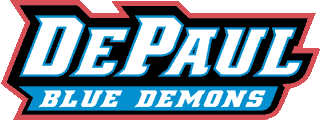

2013 Maggie Dixon Classic Champions 2013 Duel in the Desert Champions 2014 Big East Champions

NCAA tournament, Sweet Sixteen
- Conference: Big East Conference

Ranking
- Coaches: No. 22
- AP: No. 23
- Record: 29–7 (15–3 Big East)
- Head coach: Doug Bruno (28th season)
- Assistant coaches: Candis Blankson; Bart Brooks; Jill M. Pizzotti
- Home arena: McGrath-Phillips Arena (Regular Season); Allstate Arena (Tournament)

2013–14 Big East Conference women's basketball standings
	Conf.				Overall
Team	W		L	PCT	W		L	PCT
No. 23 DePaul†	15	–	3	.833	29	–	7	.806
St. John's	13	–	5	.722	23	–	11	.676
Creighton	12	–	6	.667	20	–	14	.588
Villanova	12	–	6	.667	23	–	9	.719
Marquette	11	–	7	.611	22	–	11	.667
Butler	10	–	8	.556	15	–	16	.484
Seton Hall	8	–	10	.444	20	–	14	.588
Georgetown	4	–	14	.222	11	–	21	.344
Xavier	3	–	15	.167	8	–	23	.258
Providence	2	–	16	.111	7	–	23	.233
† 2014 Big East Basketball Tournament winner As of March 11, 2014; Rankings from AP poll

The 2013–14 DePaul Blue Demons women's basketball team represented DePaul University during the 2013–14 NCAA Division I women's basketball season. The Blue Demons, led by twenty eighth year head coach Doug Bruno, played their home games at the Allstate Arena and the McGrath-Phillips Arena. They were members of the new Big East Conference. In their first season in the Big East, the Blue Demons went 27-5, 15-3 in conference play, to earn the 1 seed in the Big East tournament. The Blue Demons hosted all games of the tournament and also won the tournament title.

== Roster ==
Number	Name	Position	Height	Year	Hometown
4	Meri Bennett-Swanson	Forward	6–3	Freshman	Vernon Hills, Illinois
5	ShaKeya Graves	Guard	5–9	Freshman	Inkster, Michigan
12	Brittany Hrynko	Guard	5–8	Junior	Philadelphia, Pennsylvania
13	Chanise Jenkins	Guard	5–5	Sophomore	Chicago, Illinois
14	Jessica January	Guard	5–7	Freshman	Richfield, Minnesota
20	Kelsey Reynolds	Guard	5–7	Senior	Mishawaka, Indiana
21	Megan Rogowski	Guard	5–9	Junior	Prospect Heights, Illinois
22	Brooke Schulte	Guard	5–9	Freshman	Germantown, Illinois
23	Centrese McGee	Guard	5–7	Junior	Calumet City, Illinois
30	Megan Podkowa	Guard/Forward	6–2	Sophomore	Glenview, Illinois
31	Jasmine Penny	Forward	6–1	Senior	Logansport, Indiana
33	Madeline Crowell	Guard	5–10	Freshman	Bel Air, Maryland
44	Brandi Harvey-Carr	Forward	6–4	Freshman	Camden, New Jersey
54	Kelsey Smith	Forward	6–4	Senior	Saint Charles, Illinois

== Schedule ==
Date time, TV	Rank^{#}	Opponent^{#}	Result	Record	Site (attendance) city, state
Exhibition
10/29/2013*; 6:00 pm		St. Xavier	W 101–59	–	McGrath-Phillips Arena (N/A); Chicago, IL
11/01/2013*; 7:00 pm		Illinois Wesleyan	W 124–56	–	McGrath-Phillips Arena (N/A); Chicago, IL
Regular season
11/08/2013*; 7:30 pm		Harvard; Maggie Dixon Classic	W 99–75	1–0	McGrath-Phillips Arena (2,392); Chicago, IL
11/09/2013*; 6:00 pm		Duquesne; Maggie Dixon Classic	W 88–77	2–0	McGrath-Phillips Arena (3,254); Chicago, IL
11/18/2013*; 7:00 pm	No. 25	Illinois State	W 80–67	3–0	McGrath-Phillips Arena (2,224); Chicago, IL
11/26/2013*; 6:00 pm	No. 25	at No. 5 Notre Dame	L 76–92	3–1	Purcell Pavilion (8,518); South Bend, IN
12/01/2013*; 2:00 pm	No. 25	at Northwestern	L 79–82	3–2	Welsh-Ryan Arena (1,201); Evanston, IL
12/07/2013*; 7:00 pm		Loyola (Chicago); Red Line Rivalry	W 93–55	4–2	McGrath-Phillips Arena (2,872); Chicago, IL
12/12/2013*; 6:00 pm, FS1		No. 6 Kentucky	L 85–96	4–3	McGrath-Phillips Arena (2,577); Chicago, IL
12/16/2013*; 12:00 pm, LPTV		Dartmouth	W 90–76	5–3	McGrath-Phillips Arena (4,001); Chicago, IL
12/19/2013*; 2:00 pm, MWN		vs. Pitt; Duel in the Desert	W 77–63	6–3	Cox Pavilion (N/A); Paradise, NV
12/20/2013*; 4:30 pm, MWN		vs. Washington; Duel in the Desert	W 73–66	7–3	Cox Pavilion (N/A); Paradise, NV
12/21/2013*; 4:30 pm, MWN		vs. Louisiana–Monroe; Duel in the Desert	W 79–57	8–3	Cox Pavilion (N/A); Paradise, NV
12/29/2013*; 3:00 pm		at Bradley	W 91–67	9–3	Carver Arena (621); Peoria, IL
01/01/2014; 4:00 pm		Xavier	W 87–60	10–3 (1–0)	McGrath-Phillips Arena (2,583); Chicago, IL
01/04/2014; 4:00 pm, FS1		at Creighton	L 78–86	10–4 (1–1)	D. J. Sokol Arena (1,244); Omaha, NE
02/01/2014; 7:00 pm, LPTV		Providence	W 91–71	11–4 (2–1)	McGrath-Phillips Arena (2,135); Chicago, IL
01/11/2014; 6:00 pm, LPTV		St. John's	L 86–96	11–5 (2–2)	McGrath-Phillips Arena (2,387); Chicago, IL
01/14/2014; 6:00 pm		at Seton Hall	W 75–68	12–5 (3–2)	Prudential Center (475); Newark, NJ
01/19/2014; 2:00 pm, FS1		Villanova	W 91–65	13–5 (4–2)	McGrath-Phillips Arena (2,459); Chicago, IL
01/22/2014; 7:00 pm		at Georgetown	W 92–69	14–5 (5–2)	Verizon Center (307); Washington, D.C.
01/25/2014; 11:00 am		at Butler	W 99–94	15–5 (6–2)	Hinkle Fieldhouse (511); Indianapolis, IN
01/29/2014; 7:00 pm, LPTV		Marquette	W 91–85	16–5 (7–2)	McGrath-Phillips Arena (2,314); Chicago, IL
02/01/2014; 1:00 pm		at Providence	W 74–63	17–5 (8–2)	Dunkin' Donuts Center (513); Providence, RI
02/05/2014; 6:00 pm		at Xavier	W 78–49	18–5 (9–2)	Cintas Center (861); Cincinnati, OH
02/09/2014; 12:00 pm, FS1		Creighton	W 80–66	19–5 (10–2)	McGrath-Phillips Arena (2,531); Chicago, IL
02/15/2014; 4:00 pm, LPTV		Seton Hall	W 65–60	20–5 (11–2)	McGrath-Phillips Arena (2,731); Chicago, IL
02/18/2014; 7:00 pm		at Marquette	L 74–80	20–6 (11–3)	BMO Harris Bradley Center (1,206); Milwaukee, WI
02/22/2014; 7:00 pm, LPTV		Butler	W 97–64	21–6 (12–3)	McGrath-Phillips Arena (2,821); Chicago, IL
02/25/2014; 6:00 pm		at Villanova	W 71–56	22–6 (13–3)	The Pavilion (451); Villanova, PA
03/01/2014; 12:00 pm, FS2		at St. John's	W 80–65	23–6 (14–3)	Carnesecca Arena (1,828); Queens, NY
03/04/2014; 8:00 pm, CBSSN	No. 25	Georgetown	W 91–74	24–6 (15–3)	McGrath-Phillips Arena (2,811); Chicago, IL
Big East tournament
03/09/2014; 6:00 pm	(1) No. 25	(8) Georgetown; Quarterfinals	W 78–54	25–6	Allstate Arena (N/A); Rosemont, IL
03/10/2014; 5:30 pm, FS1	(1) No. 23	(5) Marquette; Semifinal	L 62–84	26–6	Allstate Arena (4,357); Rosemont, IL
03/11/2014; 8:00 pm, FS1	(1) No. 23	(2) St. John's; Championship	W 65–57	27–6	Allstate Arena (3,163); Rosemont, IL
NCAA tournament
03/22/2014*; 12:30 pm, ESPN2	(L 7) No. 23	vs. (L 10) Oklahoma; First Round	W 104–100	28–6	Cameron Indoor Stadium (3,013); Durham, NC
03/24/2014*; 5:30 pm, ESPN2	(L 7) No. 23	at (L 2) No. 9 Duke; Second Round	W 74–65	29–6	Cameron Indoor Stadium (2,787); Durham, NC
03/29/2014*; 6:00 pm, ESPN	(L 7) No. 23	vs. (L 3) No. 15 Texas A&M; Sweet Sixteen	L 65–84	29–7	Pinnacle Bank Arena (9,585); Lincoln, NE
*Non-conference game. ^{#}Rankings from AP Poll. (#) Tournament seedings in parentheses. All times are in Central Time.
