= 2010–11 NCAA Division I women's basketball rankings =

- Season: 2010–11
- NCAA Tournament: 2011
- Preseason No. 1: Connecticut
- NCAA Tournament Champions: Texas A&M Aggies
NCAA Division I women's basketball rankings


Two human polls comprise the 2010–11 NCAA Division I women's basketball rankings, the AP Poll and the Coaches Poll, in addition to various publications' preseason polls. The AP poll is currently a poll of sportswriters, while the USA Today Coaches' Poll is a poll of college coaches. The AP conducts polls weekly through the end of the regular season and conference play, while the Coaches poll conducts a final, post-NCAA tournament poll as well.

== Legend ==
–	Not ranked
(#)	Ranking

== AP Poll ==
Team	Pre- Season	Nov 16	Nov 22	Nov 29	Dec 6	Dec 13	Dec 20	Dec 27	Jan 3	Jan 10	Jan 17	Jan 24	Jan 31	Feb 7	Feb 14	Feb 21	Feb 28	Mar 7
Connecticut	1	1	1	1	1	1	1	1	2	2	2	2	2	2	2	1	1	1
Stanford	3	3	3	3	3	3	8	9	4	4	4	4	4	3	3	2	2	2
Baylor	2	2	2	2	2	2	2	2	1	1	1	1	1	1	1	3	3	3
Tennessee	4	4	4	9	8	6	5	5	5	5	5	5	5	4	4	4	4	4
Xavier	5	5	5	4	4	5	4	4	9	8	7	7	7	7	6	6	6	5
Duke	6	6	6	5	5	4	3	3	3	3	3	3	3	5	7	9	8	6
UCLA	16	15	13	13	10	9	9	8	12	10	8	11	10	9	9	11	9	7
Texas A&M	8	8	8	7	7	8	7	7	7	7	6	6	6	6	5	5	5	8
DePaul	–	–	–	–	24	22	16	21	16	14	13	12	9	10	10	7	12	9
Notre Dame	12	12	18	16	18	17	17	16	13	12	11	9	8	8	8	8	7	10
Miami (FL)	–	–	–	–	–	–	–	–	–	22	17	16	18	20	13	12	10	11
Michigan State	25	25	25	25	15	14	12	12	11	9	12	10	11	11	11	10	11	12
Green Bay	–	–	–	–	23	–	–	–	–	23	21	22	21	18	17	17	15	13
North Carolina	15	14	14	14	12	10	10	10	8	11	10	15	15	13	12	13	19	14
Florida State	18	16	15	15	17	15	22	25	24	21	22	21	19	19	15	14	14	15
Maryland	21	21	23	22	22	19	19	18	14	13	15	14	12	12	16	15	13	16
Kentucky	9	9	9	8	14	13	11	11	10	19	19	17	16	15	19	20	16	17
Ohio State	7	7	7	6	6	11	13	13	20	24	25	24	–	–	–	–	–	18
Marist	–	–	–	–	–	–	–	–	–	–	–	–	–	25	24	21	21	19
Gonzaga	–	–	–	–	–	–	–	–	–	–	–	–	–	–	25	23	22	20
Oklahoma	10	11	11	11	13	12	15	15	19	15	14	13	13	14	14	16	18	21
Houston	–	–	–	–	–	–	–	–	–	–	–	–	–	–	–	–	25	22
Georgetown	13	13	12	12	11	20	20	19	15	18	16	19	17	16	18	18	17	23
Georgia Tech	–	–	–	–	–	–	–	–	–	–	–	25	25	–	–	–	–	24
Marquette	–	–	–	–	–	–	–	–	–	–	–	–	23	21	22	24	20	25
Boston College	–	–	–	–	–	25	24	–	–	–	–	–	–	–	–	–	–	–
Virginia	–	–	–	–	–	–	–	–	–	–	–	–	–	–	–	–	–	–
North Carolina State	–	–	–	–	–	–	–	–	–	–	–	–	–	–	–	–	–	–
Iowa State	20	19	19	19	16	21	21	20	17	17	20	23	22	22	20	25	23	–
Iowa	22	22	20	18	19	16	14	14	21	16	18	18	20	–	–	–	24	–
West Virginia	11	10	10	10	9	7	6	6	6	6	9	8	14	17	21	19	–	–
Georgia	19	18	17	21	25	–	–	–	–	–	24	20	24	24	–	22	–	–
Penn State	–	–	–	–	–	–	–	–	–	–	–	–	–	23	23	–	–	–
Arkansas	–	–	–	–	–	–	25	22	25	20	23	–	–	–	–	–	–	–
Syracuse	–	–	–	–	–	24	23	24	23	25	–	–	–	–	–	–	–	–
St. John's	14	20	22	20	20	18	18	17	18	–	–	–	–	–	–	–	–	–
Texas	17	17	16	17	21	23	–	23	22	–	–	–	–	–	–	–	–	–
Vanderbilt	24	23	24	23	–	–	–	–	–	–	–	–	–	–	–	–	–	–
Nebraska	–	–	–	24	–	–	–	–	–	–	–	–	–	–	–	–	–	–
TCU	23	24	21	–	–	–	–	–	–	–	–	–	–	–	–	–	–	–

== USA Today Coaches poll ==
Team	Pre- Season	Nov 16	Nov 22	Nov 29	Dec 7	Dec 14	Dec 21	Dec 28	Jan 4	Jan 11	Jan 18	Jan 25	Feb 1	Feb 8	Feb 15	Feb 22	Mar 1	Mar 7	Apr 5
Connecticut	1	1	1	1	1	1	1	1	2	2	2	2	2	2	2	1	1	1	3
Stanford	3	3	2	2	2	2	8	8	4	4	4	4	3	3	3	2	2	2	4
Baylor	2	2	3	3	3	3	2	2	1	1	1	1	1	1	1	3	3	3	5
Duke	5	6	6	5	4	4	3	3	3	3	3	3	5	7	7	9	7	6	7
Xavier	6	5	5	4	5	5	4	4	9	8	7	7	7	6	6	6	6	5	11
Tennessee	4	4	4	8	7	6	7	6	6	6	6	6	4	4	4	4	4	4	6
Texas A&M	8	8	8	7	8	7	5	5	5	5	5	5	6	5	5	5	5	8	1
West Virginia	11	11	11	10	9	8	6	7	7	7	9	8	15	19	20	18	22	25	–
UCLA	15	15	13	12	10	9	9	9	11	9	8	10	9	9	9	10	9	9	13
Ohio State	7	7	7	6	6	10	12	12	21	24	–	23	–	–	–	–	–	24	17
North Carolina	18	16	15	15	13	11	10	10	8	11	11	14	12	10	13	16	19	14	12
Oklahoma	9	9	10	11	11	12	14	14	17	14	13	12	11	12	15	15	17	20	15
Kentucky	10	10	9	9	14	13	11	11	10	19	19	18	18	18	19	20	16	16	22
Florida State	14	14	14	14	16	14	20	23	19	15	16	15	14	15	12	12	14	15	20
Iowa	25	24	21	18	19	15	13	13	22	20	21	21	22	–	–	–	–	–	–
Notre Dame	12	12	16	16	18	16	15	14	12	12	10	9	8	8	8	7	8	7	2
Michigan State	24	22	–	25	20	17	16	16	13	10	12	11	15	13	10	8	11	13	18
St. John's	16	23	24	24	21	18	17	17	18	22	23	–	23	25	22	–	–	–	–
Georgetown	13	13	12	13	12	19	19	18	14	17	17	19	19	17	18	19	21	21	14
Iowa State	17	17	17	17	15	20	21	19	16	16	20	20	20	20	23	24	25	–	–
Nebraska	23	21	20	19	22	21	–	–	–	–	–	–	–	–	–	–	–	–	–
Maryland	–	–	–	–	23	22	22	20	15	13	14	13	10	11	17	17	15	18	23
Green Bay	–	–	23	21	17	23	23	21	20	18	15	16	17	16	14	13	12	11	9
Boston College	–	–	–	–	25	24	24	25	–	–	–	–	–	–	–	–	–	–	–
Texas	20	19	19	20	24	–	–	–	24	–	–	–	–	–	–	–	–	–	–
DePaul	–	–	–	–	–	25	18	22	23	21	18	17	13	14	11	11	13	12	10
Gonzaga	22	–	–	–	–	–	–	–	–	–	–	–	–	–	–	23	20	19	8
Louisville	–	–	–	–	–	–	–	–	–	–	–	–	–	–	–	–	–	–	19
Marist	–	–	–	–	–	–	–	–	–	–	–	–	–	24	24	21	18	17	21
Georgia	19	18	18	22	–	–	–	–	–	–	–	24	–	–	–	–	–	–	24
Marquette	–	–	–	–	–	–	–	–	–	–	–	–	24	22	21	22	23	23	25
Georgia Tech	–	–	–	–	–	–	–	–	–	–	–	–	–	–	–	–	–	–	–
Wake Forest	–	–	–	–	–	–	–	–	–	–	–	–	–	–	–	–	–	–	–
Virginia	–	–	–	–	–	–	–	–	–	–	–	–	–	–	–	–	–	–	–
North Carolina State	–	–	–	–	–	–	–	–	–	–	–	–	–	–	–	–	–	–	–
Houston	–	–	–	–	–	–	–	–	–	–	–	–	–	–	–	25	24	22	–
Penn State	–	–	–	–	–	–	–	–	–	–	–	–	–	23	25	–	–	–	–
Syracuse	–	–	–	–	–	–	–	–	–	–	–	–	25	–	–	–	–	–	–
Texas A&M	–	–	–	–	–	–	–	–	–	–	25	25	–	–	–	–	–	–	–
Arkansas	–	–	–	–	–	–	25	24	–	23	24	–	–	–	–	–	–	–	–
Oklahoma State	–	–	–	–	–	–	–	–	25	–	–	–	–	–	–	–	–	–	–
Vanderbilt	21	20	22	23	–	–	–	–	–	–	–	–	–	–	–	–	–	–	–
TCU	–	25	25	–	–	–	–	–	–	–	–	–	–	–	–	–	–	–	–
Miami (FL)	–	–	–	–	–	–	–	–	–	25	22	22	21	21	16	14	10	10	16
