= Marquette Golden Eagles women's basketball =

2026–27 Marquette Golden Eagles women's basketball team
- University: Marquette University
- Head coach: Cara Consuegra (3rd season)
- Location: Milwaukee, Wisconsin
- Arena: Al McGuire Center (capacity: 4,000)
- Conference: Big East
- Nickname: Golden Eagles
- Colors: Blue and gold

NCAA Division I tournament second round
- 1997, 2004, 2007, 2011, 2018, 2019

NCAA Division I tournament appearances
- 1994, 1995, 1997, 1998, 1999, 2000, 2004, 2007, 2011, 2017, 2018, 2019, 2021, 2023, 2024

Conference tournament champions
- Great Midwest Conference (1995); Big East Conference (2017)

Conference regular-season champions
- Great Midwest Conference (1993); Conference USA (1999, 2000); Big East Conference (2018, 2019)

The Marquette Golden Eagles women's basketball team represents Marquette University in Milwaukee, Wisconsin, United States. The school's team currently competes in the Big East after moving from Conference USA following the 2004–05 season. The Golden Eagles first competed in the North Star Conference from 1986–87 until it joined the Midwestern Collegiate Conference (now Horizon League) for the 1989–90 and 1990–91 seasons. The Golden Eagles changed conferences again, joining the Great Midwest Conference, where it competed for four seasons until joining Conference USA beginning with the 1995–96 season. The women's basketball team began competing in 1975–1976 under coach Tat Shiely, earning a 12–4 record in its first year.

== Notable players ==
- Natisha Hiedeman (born 1997) "T" is half of the famous StudBudz and currently plays for the Minnesota Lynx in the WNBA. Also has played for the Israeli team Maccabi Bnot Ashdod and the Connecticut Sun of the Women's National Basketball Association (WNBA).

== Year by year results ==
Record table
Season	Coach	Overall	Conference	Standing	Postseason
Tat Shiely (Independent) (1975–1986)
1975–76	Tat Shiely	12–4			
1976–77	Tat Shiely	5–14			
1977–78	Tat Shiely	12–8			
1978–79	Tat Shiely	7–12			
1979–80	Tat Shiely	15–11			
1980–81	Tat Shiely	14–13			
1981–82	Tat Shiely	10–21			
1982–83	Tat Shiely	6–18			
1983–84	Tat Shiely	14–13			
1984–85	Tat Shiely	11–14			
1985–86	Tat Shiely	5–20			
Tat Shiely:		111–148 (.429)			
Sr. Maria Pares (North Star Conference) (1986–1989)
1986–87	Sr. Maria Pares	9–18	0–6	7th	
1987–88	Sr. Maria Pares	9–19	2–8		
1988–89	Sr. Maria Pares	13–15	7–8		
North Star Conference:			9–22 (.290)		
Sr. Maria Pares (Midwestern Collegiate Conference) (1989–1990)
1989–90	Sr. Maria Pares	11–17	9–7	3rd	
Sr. Maria Pares:		42–69 (.378)	9–22 (.290) North Star; 9–7 (.563) MCC		
Jim Jabir (Midwestern Collegiate Conference) (1990–1991)
1990–91	Jim Jabir	7–20	3–13	8th	
Midwestern Collegiate Conference:			12–20 (.375)		
Jim Jabir (Great Midwest Conference) (1991–1995)
1991–92	Jim Jabir	16–13	7–3		
1992–93	Jim Jabir	22–9	10–0	1st	NWIT 4th Place
1993–94	Jim Jabir	22–7	9–1		NCAA Round of 64
1994–95	Jim Jabir	19–12	9–3		NCAA Round of 64
Great Midwest Conference:			35–7 (.833)		
Jim Jabir (Conference USA) (1995–1996)
1995–96	Jim Jabir	8–20	5–9	7th	
Jim Jabir:		94–81 (.537)	3–13 (.188) MCC; 35–7 (.833) GMC; 5–9 (.357) CUSA		
Terri Mitchell (Conference USA) (1996–2005)
1996–97	Terri Mitchell	21–10	10–4	T-4th	NCAA Second Round
1997–98	Terri Mitchell	22–7	13–3	2nd	NCAA First Round
1998–99	Terri Mitchell	21–8	12–4	T-1st	NCAA First Round
1999–2000	Terri Mitchell	22–7	14–2	1st	NCAA First Round
2000–01	Terri Mitchell	13–16	8–8	T-7th	
2001–02	Terri Mitchell	14–14	7–7	T-7th	
2002–03	Terri Mitchell	16–14	6–8	T-7th	WNIT Second Round
2003–04	Terri Mitchell	22–10	9–5	T-5th	NCAA Second Round
2004–05	Terri Mitchell	18–12	8–6	7th	WNIT First Round
Conference USA:			92–56 (.622)		
Terri Mitchell (Big East) (2005–2014)
2005–06	Terri Mitchell	22–11	9–7	T-6th	WNIT Runner-up
2006–07	Terri Mitchell	26–7	12–4	T-2nd	NCAA Second Round
2007–08	Terri Mitchell	21–14	8–8	T-8th	WNIT Champions
2008–09	Terri Mitchell	17–16	7–9	T-9th	WNIT Second Round
2009–10	Terri Mitchell	17–16	6–10	T-10th	WNIT Second Round
2010–11	Terri Mitchell	24–9	10–6	T-5th	NCAA Second Round
2011–12	Terri Mitchell	14–17	4–12	14th	
2012–13	Terri Mitchell	16–16	7–9	T-9th	WNIT First Round
2013–14	Terri Mitchell	22–11	11–7	4th	WNIT Second Round
Terri Mitchell:		326–204 (.615)	87–47 (.649) CUSA; 63–65 (.492) Big East		
Carolyn Kieger (Big East) (2014–2019)
2014–15	Carolyn Kieger	9–22	4–14	8th	
2015–16	Carolyn Kieger	14–16	9–9	T-5th	
2016–17	Carolyn Kieger	25–7	13–5	3rd	NCAA first round
2017–18	Carolyn Kieger	24–10	15–3	T-1st	NCAA second round
2018–19	Carolyn Kieger	26–6	15–3	1st	NCAA second round
Carolyn Kieger:		98–61 (.616)	56–34 (.622)		
Megan Duffy (Big East) (2019–2024)
2019–20	Megan Duffy	24–8	13–5	2nd	NCAA canceled due to coronavirus pandemic
2020–21	Megan Duffy	19–7	14–3	2nd	NCAA first round
2021–22	Megan Duffy	23–11	13–7	5th	WNIT third round
2022–23	Megan Duffy	21–11	13–7	T-4th	NCAA First Round
2023–24	Megan Duffy	23–9	11–7	T–3rd	NCAA First Round
Megan Duffy:		110–46 (.705)	64–30 (.681)		
Total:		779–607 (.562)			
National champion Postseason invitational champion Conference regular season champion Conference regular season and conference tournament champion Division regular season champion Division regular season and conference tournament champion Conference tournament champion

== NCAA tournament results ==
Marquette has appeared in the NCAA Division I women's basketball tournament thirteen times. They have a record of 6–13.

Year	Seed	Round	Opponent	Result
1994	#14	First Round	(3) Colorado	L 74–77
1995	#10	First Round	(7) NC State	L 62–77
1997	#12	First Round; Second Round	(5) Clemson (4) LSU	W 70–66; L 58–71
1998	#10	First Round	(7) FIU	L 45–59
1999	#8	First Round	(9) Kansas	L 58–64
2000	#7	First Round	(10) Western Kentucky	L 65–68
2004	#9	First Round; Second Round	(8) Old Dominion (1) Duke	W 67–64; L 67–76
2007	#6	First Round; Second Round	(11) La.-Lafayette (3) Oklahoma	W 87–58; L 47–78
2011	#8	First Round; Second Round	(9) Texas (1) Tennessee	W 68–65; L 70–79
2017	#5	First Round	(12) Quinnipiac	L 65–68
2018	#8	First Round; Second Round	(9) Dayton (1) Louisville	W 84–65; L 72–90
2019	#5	First Round; Second Round	(12) Rice (4) Texas A&M	W 58–54 (OT); L 76–78
2021	#10	First Round	(7) Virginia Tech	L 63–70

== Roster ==
2026–27 Marquette Golden Eagles women's basketball team
Players
Coaches

Pos.	#	Name	Height	Year	Previous school	Hometown
G/F	1	Brooklyn Hall	6 ft 1 in (1.85 m)	RS Fr	South Florida	Dayton, OH
G	2	Kinley Asp	5 ft 11 in (1.8 m)	Fr	Air Academy	Colorado Springs, CO
G	3	Se'Crette Carter	5 ft 8 in (1.73 m)	Fr	Belleville	Rockwood, MI
F	5	Noelle Anthon	6 ft 2 in (1.88 m)	Jr	Hutchinson	Oconomowoc, WI
G	10	Kam Herring	6 ft 1 in (1.85 m)	So	Woodward Academy	Atlanta, GA
G	11	Yu Han Lin	5 ft 9 in (1.75 m)	So	Middle Tennessee	Hualien, Taiwan
G/F	12	MacKenzie Givens	6 ft 0 in (1.83 m)	Jr	Xavier	Cincinnati, OH
G	20	Jordan Meulemans	6 ft 0 in (1.83 m)	Sr	Butler	De Pere, WI
G	22	Halle Vice	6 ft 1 in (1.85 m)	Sr	Pleasant Valley	Bettendorf, IA
G	24	JJ Barnes	5 ft 9 in (1.75 m)	RS Fr	The Prairie School	Racine, WI
F	34	Kayl Petersen	6 ft 1 in (1.85 m)	Jr	Virginia Tech	Waupun, WI
C	tbd	Amina Traore	6 ft 2 in (1.88 m)	Sr	AS Monaco	Paris, France

Head coach

- Cara Consuegra (Iowa)

Assistant coach(es)

- Deont'a McChester (Keuka)
- Sheila Boykin (LSU)
- Joe Silvestri (Central Florida)
- Sam Logic (Iowa)
- Michael Garven (Marquette)

Legend

- (C) Team captain
- (S) Suspended
- (I) Ineligible
- (W) Walk-on
- Injured
- Current redshirt

Roster
Last update: September 6, 2026
