= Trend (disambiguation) =

A trend is a form of collective behavior in which a group of people enthusiastically follow an impulse for a short period.

Trend, trending, trendy, or trends may also refer to:

== Data patterns and forecasting ==
- Market trend, an element of Market analysis
- Market trend, a period of time when prices in a financial market are rising or falling faster than their historical average
  - Real estate trend, changes impacting real estate brokers, agents and the housing industry
- Twitter trends, words, phrases, or topics that are mentioned at a greater rate than others on Twitter
- Food trends
- Trend estimation, the statistical analysis of data to extrapolate trends
- Periodic trends, the tendency of chemical characteristics to follow patterns along rows or columns of the periodic table of elements
- Trend type forecast, a short period weather forecast supplied to airfields

== Arts, entertainment, and media ==
=== Periodicals ===
- Trend (magazine), an Austrian business weekly
- Trends (American magazine), published in Arizona
- Trends (Belgian magazine), a Belgian business magazine
- Trends (journals), a series of scientific journals of biology published by Cell Press

=== Other ===
- The Trend (TV programme), a Kenyan talk show
- Trend Records, a record label
- Trending, a radio programme on the BBC World Service
- "Trends" (short story), a 1939 science fiction short story by Isaac Asimov
- Trend (typeface), a type face cut by Baltimore Type Foundry

== Other uses ==
- Trend, Denmark, a town in North Jutland
- Trend-Arlington, a neighbourhood of Ottawa, Canada
- The Trend, a Marxist-Leninist political movement of the mid-1970s through the mid-1990s in the United States
- Google Trends, a website that analyzes the popularity of Google Search queries
- Trend, the former brand name of Purex (laundry detergent), launched in 1946
- Trend (surname), people with this name

== See also ==
- Trendz (disambiguation)
- Trend line (disambiguation)
- Trend Micro, a Japanese company that develops anti-virus computer software
- Trendies, a teenage subculture in Europe and the US from the 1990s to the 2010s
