= WNBA Cares Community Assist Award =

The Women's National Basketball Association's Community Assist Award (or WNBA Cares Community Assist Award) is an award given by the Women's National Basketball Association (WNBA) to highlight meritorious community service, charity, and leadership. A monthly version of the award has been presented to players and/or teams since the 2008 WNBA season, while a season-long award has been given since the 2017 WNBA season.

The award is sponsored by the WNBA and State Farm and typically includes a monetary donation to one or several charitable causes.

== Season-long winners ==
In 2017, the first season-long WNBA Community Assist Award was given to the entire New York Liberty team for its impact on communities across New York City and New Jersey. As such, a $20,000 donation was split between several charities, including The Ali Forney Center, Garden of Dreams Foundation, Hopey’s Heart Foundation, Girls for Gender Equity, Nissan’s Place, and Ingersoll Community Center.

Since then, the award has generally been given to individual players, with one exception being the 2020 season, in which all WNBA players were honored with the award, and $50,000 was donated to the Say Her Name campaign.

Key

	Denotes player who won both a season-long and a monthly award
	Denotes entire team winning the award
	Denotes two or more players sharing the award
Team (X)	Denotes the number of times a player from this team has won

Season-long WNBA Community Assist Award winners
Season	Player	Team	Donation(s)	Ref.
2017	—N/a	New York Liberty	$20,000 split between The Ali Forney Center, Garden of Dreams Foundation, Hopey’s Heart Foundation, Girls for Gender Equity, Nissan’s Place and Ingersoll Community Center	
2018	Nnkeka Oqwumike	Los Angeles Sparks (3)	$20,000 to LA’s BEST After School Enrichment	
2019	Natalie Achonwa	Indiana Fever	$10,000 each, to both Girl Talk Inc. and Dressed for School	
2020	All WNBA players	—N/a	$50,000 to the Say Her Name campaign	
2021	Amanda Zahui B.	Los Angeles Sparks (3)	$25,000 to Brotherhood Crusade	
2022	Brianna Turner	Phoenix Mercury (2)	$20,000 split among Equality Texas, Athlete Ally, and Billy’s Place	
2023	Brittney Griner	Phoenix Mercury (2)	$20,000 split between Bring our Families Home and Phoenix Rescue Mission	
2024	Azurá Stevens	Los Angeles Sparks (3)	$20,000 to United Way of Asheville and Buncombe County in North Carolina	
2025	Tiffany Hayes	Golden State Valkyries	$20,000 to Changing Faces Inc.	

== Monthly winners ==
Since 2008, a monthly version of the WNBA Cares Community Assist Award has been presented to players during the months of June, July, and August. However, entire teams have also received the award, such as the Tulsa Shock team in 2013 and the New York Liberty team in 2017. The monthly award for players began including the month of May in 2014. An exception where there was no monthly award was the 2020 season, where only the season-long award, and it was presented to all WNBA players.

Key

	Denotes player who won both a season-long and a monthly award
	Denotes entire team winning the award
	Denotes two or more players sharing the award
Player (X)	Denotes the number of times the player has won
Team (X)*	Denotes the number of times a player from this team has won

*Note: The New York Liberty team's win in 2017 has not been included in its "Team (X)" tally.

Monthly WNBA Cares Community Assist Award winners
Season	May	June (player, team)	July (player, team)	August (player, team)
2008	—N/a	Sylvia Fowles (2), Chicago Sky (5)	Candice Wiggins (2), Minnesota Lynx (5)	Ruth Riley(2), San Antonio Silver Stars (2)
2009	—N/a	Temeka Johnson, Phoenix Mercury (4)	Candice Dupree (2), Chicago Sky (5)	Courtney Paris, Sacramento Monarchs
2010	—N/a	Sue Bird, Seattle Storm (4)	Sylvia Fowles (2), Chicago Sky (5)	Katie Douglas (2), Indiana Fever (8)
2011	—N/a	Kara Lawson, Connecticut Sun (4)	Tamika Catchings (2), Indiana Fever (8)	Swin Cash, Seattle Storm (4)
2012	—N/a	Ruth Riley(2), Chicago Sky (5)	Candice Wiggins (2), Minnesota Lynx (5)	Delisha Milton-Jones, Los Angeles Sparks (3)
2013	Tulsa Shock team	Katie Smith, New York Liberty (7)	Tamika Catchings (2), Indiana Fever (8)	Katie Douglas (2), Indiana Fever (8)
2014	Tina Charles (3), New York Liberty (7)	Essence Carson (2), New York Liberty (7)	Chiney Ogwumike, Connecticut Sun (4) Nneka Ogwumike, Los Angeles Sparks (3)	Briann January (3), Indiana Fever (8)
2015	Jeanette Pohlen, Indiana Fever (8)	Essence Carson (2), New York Liberty (7)	Elena Delle Donne, Chicago Sky (5)	Briann January (3), Indiana Fever (8)
2016	Tina Charles (3), New York Liberty (7)	Elizabeth Williams, Atlanta Dream	Carolyn Swords, New York Liberty (7)	Jayne Appel-Marinelli, San Antonio Stars (2)
2017	New York Liberty team	Brittney Griner, Phoenix Mercury (4)	Alysha Clark (2), Seattle Storm (4)	Tina Charles (3), New York Liberty (7)
2018	Diana Taurasi, Phoenix Mercury (4)	Maya Moore, Minnesota Lynx (5)	Alysha Clark (2), Seattle Storm (4)	Candice Dupree (2), Indiana Fever (8)
2019	Briann January (3), Phoenix Mercury (4)	Danielle Robinson, Minnesota Lynx (5)	A’ja Wilson, Las Vegas Aces	Jasmine Thomas (2), Connecticut Sun (4)
2020*	—N/a			
2021	Amanda Zahui B., Los Angeles Sparks (3)	Jasmine Thomas (2), Connecticut Sun (4)	Arike Ogunbowale, Dallas Wings	Layshia Clarendon, Minnesota Lynx (5)

*Note: There was no monthly award for the 2020 season. Only the season-long award was presented, and it went to all WNBA players.

== See also ==
- List of sports awards honoring women
