= Trendspotting =

Trendspotting is the identification of new trends. It also may refer to:

- Trendspotting, recurring segment of The Daily Show

== See also ==
- Coolhunting
