= 2012 Big East women's basketball tournament =

- Tournament Logo
- Classification: Division I
- Teams: 16
- Site: XL Center; Hartford, Connecticut
- Champions: Connecticut (18th title)
- Winning coach: Geno Auriemma (18th title)
- Television: BigEast.tv, ESPN3, ESPNU, ESPN

2011–12 Big East Conference women's basketball standings
	Conf.				Overall
Team	W		L	PCT	W		L	PCT
No. 4 Notre Dame	15	–	1	.938	35	–	4	.897
No. 3 Connecticut†	13	–	3	.813	33	–	5	.868
No. 14 St. John's	13	–	3	.813	24	–	10	.706
No. T17 Georgetown	11	–	5	.688	23	–	9	.719
West Virginia	11	–	5	.688	24	–	10	.706
No. 19 Louisville	10	–	6	.625	23	–	10	.697
Rutgers	10	–	6	.625	22	–	10	.688
DePaul	9	–	7	.563	23	–	11	.676
South Florida	8	–	8	.500	19	–	16	.543
Syracuse	6	–	10	.375	22	–	15	.595
Villanova	6	–	10	.375	19	–	15	.559
Cincinnati	6	–	10	.375	16	–	16	.500
Providence	5	–	11	.313	13	–	17	.433
Marquette	4	–	12	.250	14	–	17	.452
Seton Hall	1	–	15	.063	8	–	23	.258
Pittsburgh	0	–	16	.000	8	–	22	.267
† 2012 Big East Basketball Tournament winner Rankings from AP poll

The 2012 Big East women's basketball tournament took place in March 2012 at the XL Center in Hartford, Connecticut. The winner received the Big East Conference's automatic bid to the 2012 NCAA tournament. This was the third consecutive year Big East tournament to include all 16 of the conference's teams. The teams finishing 9 through 16 in the regular season standings played first round games, while teams 5 through 8 received byes to the second round. The top 4 teams during the regular season received double-byes to the quarterfinals.

== Final regular season standing ==
2011–12 Big East Women's Basketball Standings
Seed	School	Conf	Overall	Tiebreaker
#1	‡†Notre Dame	15-1	28-2	
#2	†St. John's	13-3	21-8	1-0 vs CONN
#3	†Connecticut	13-3	26-4	0-1 vs STJ
#4	†Georgetown	11-5	22-7	1-0 vs WVU
#5	#West Virginia	11-5	21-8	0-1 vs GU
#6	#Rutgers	10-6	21-8	1-0 vs LOU
#7	#Louisville	10-6	21-8	0-1 vs RUT
#8	#DePaul	9-7	21-9	
#9	South Florida	8-8	16-14	
#10	Villanova	6-10	16-13	1-0 vs CIN; 1-0 vs SYR
#11	Cincinnati	6-10	15-14	0-1 vs NOVA; 1-0 vs SYR
#12	Syracuse	6-10	17-13	0-1 vs NOVA; 0-1 vs CIN
#13	Providence	5-11	13-16	
#14	Marquette	4-12	13-16	
#15	Seton Hall	1-15	8-22	
#16	Pittsburgh	0-16	8-21	
‡ – Big East regular season champions, and tournament No. 1 seed. † – Received a double-bye in the conference tournament. # – Received a single-bye in the conference tournament. Overall records are as of the end of the regular season.
2012 NCAA Tournament Selection
2012 WNIT Tournament Selection

‡ Regular season Big East champion

== Bracket ==
First round Friday, March 2, 2012; Bigeast.tv
12	Syracuse	57
13	Providence	47
9	South Florida	60
16	Pittsburgh	59
10	Villanova	61
15	Seton Hall	60
11	Cincinnati	51
14	Marquette	54

Second round Saturday, March 3, 2012; BETV
4	Georgetown
BYE
5	West Virginia	63
12	Syracuse	48
1	Notre Dame
BYE
8	DePaul	76
9	South Florida	62
2	St. John's
BYE
7	Louisville	63
10	Villanova	47
3	Connecticut
BYE
6	Rutgers	52
14	Marquette	43

Quarterfinals; Sunday, March 4, 2012; ESPNU
4	Georgetown	32
5	West Virginia	39
1	Notre Dame	69
8	DePaul	54
2	St. John's	68^{OT}
7	Louisville	61
3	Connecticut	49
6	Rutgers	34

Semifinals; Monday, March 5, 2012; ESPNU
5	West Virginia	45
1	Notre Dame	73
2	St. John's	43
3	Connecticut	74

Championship Game; Tuesday, March 6, 2012; ESPN
1	Notre Dame	54
3	Connecticut	63

- ^{OT} - Denotes Overtime Game

== See also ==
- 2012 NCAA Women's Division I Basketball Tournament
- 2012 Big East men's basketball tournament
