= Girl Talk =

Girl Talk may refer to:

== Music ==
- Girl Talk (duo), a 1980s British girl group
- Girl Talk (musician), Gregg Michael Gillis (born 1981), American music producer and mashup artist

=== Albums ===
- Girl Talk (Holly Cole album), 1990
- Girl Talk (Kate Nash album), 2013
- Girl Talk (Lesley Gore album), 1964
- Girl Talk (Oscar Peterson album), 1968
- Girl Talk (Shirley Scott album), 1967

=== Songs ===
- "Girl Talk" (Dhani Lennevald song), 2004
- "Girl Talk" (Neal Hefti song), written by Neal Hefti and Bobby Troup, 1964
- "Girl Talk" (TLC song), 2002
- "Girl Talk"/"The Speed Star", by Namie Amuro, 2004
- "Girl Talk", a jazz instrumental by Cindy Bradley feat. Paula Atherton, 2017

== Television ==
- Girl Talk, a 1963–1969 talk show hosted by Virginia Graham
- Girl Talk, a 1989 talk show hosted by Sarah Michelle Gellar and Russell Koplin
- "Girl Talk" (Fuller House), a 2016 episode
- "Girl Talk" (The Paynes), a 2018 episode
- "Girl Talk" (Roseanne), a 1994 episode

== Other uses ==
- Girl Talk (board game), a 1988 board game
- Girl Talk (video game), a 1998 video game
- Girl Talk (books), a 1990–1992 series of novels for teenage girls by L. E. Blair
- Girl Talk (magazine), a British magazine aimed at preteens
- Girl Talk Inc., an international student-to-student mentoring program
- Girl Talk, a 1989 film directed by Frank Harris

== See also ==
- Girls Talk (disambiguation)
