= 2011–12 Pittsburgh Panthers women's basketball team =

Intercollegiate basketball season

2011–12 Pittsburgh Panthers women's basketball

Caribbean Classic Champions
- Conference: Big East
- Record: 8–22 (0–16 Big East)
- Head coach: Agnus Berenato
- Assistant coaches: Patty Coyle; Khadija Head; Mallorie Winn
- Home arena: Petersen Events Center

2011–12 Big East Conference women's basketball standings
	Conf.				Overall
Team	W		L	PCT	W		L	PCT
No. 4 Notre Dame	15	–	1	.938	35	–	4	.897
No. 3 Connecticut†	13	–	3	.813	33	–	5	.868
No. 14 St. John's	13	–	3	.813	24	–	10	.706
No. T17 Georgetown	11	–	5	.688	23	–	9	.719
West Virginia	11	–	5	.688	24	–	10	.706
No. 19 Louisville	10	–	6	.625	23	–	10	.697
Rutgers	10	–	6	.625	22	–	10	.688
DePaul	9	–	7	.563	23	–	11	.676
South Florida	8	–	8	.500	19	–	16	.543
Syracuse	6	–	10	.375	22	–	15	.595
Villanova	6	–	10	.375	19	–	15	.559
Cincinnati	6	–	10	.375	16	–	16	.500
Providence	5	–	11	.313	13	–	17	.433
Marquette	4	–	12	.250	14	–	17	.452
Seton Hall	1	–	15	.063	8	–	23	.258
Pittsburgh	0	–	16	.000	8	–	22	.267
† 2012 Big East Basketball Tournament winner Rankings from AP poll

The 2011–12 Pittsburgh Panthers women's basketball team represented the University of Pittsburgh in the 2011–12 NCAA Division I women's basketball season. The Panthers, coached by Agnus Berenato, were a member of the Big East Conference and played their home games at the Petersen Events Center in Pittsburgh, Pennsylvania.

== Previous season ==
An unusual distribution of players by academic class, with five seniors and six freshmen, but no juniors or sophomores, and three new assistant coaches, resulted in some growing pains for the 2010-11 Pitt women's basketball team, which went 14–17, suffering their first losing season since 2004–05. In the Big East, the team finished with a 5–11 record, finishing as the 12th seed in the Big East tournament. The Panthers won their first round of the tournament to South Florida, but exited the tournament with a 61–65 loss to Marquette, leaving the Panthers without a post-season tournament invitation for the first time since 2005.

== Offseason ==
The Panthers lost their top four scorers, seniors Taneisha Harrison, Jania Sims, Chelsea Cole, and Shayla Scott, and returned only one starter, Ashlee Anderson, along with five letter winners, while welcoming seven newcomers. Composed of six sophomores and six freshmen, with no seniors or juniors, Pitt was the youngest team in NCAA Division 1 for the 2010–11 season. Pitt looked to help replace 74.6% of its scoring, 64.1% of its rebounds, and 75.8% of its assists with its best ever recruiting class, ranked 18th by ESPN's Hoopgurlz, along with redshirt sophomore Abby Dowd, who began play with the team after transferring from Buffalo during the previous season.

Staff moves included moving Meghan Bielich to director of basketball operations and adding David Scarborough as the team's video coordinator. Assistant coach Patty Coyle was promoted to associate head coach.

The women's basketball team entered the season with modest expectations due to their inexperience, and were picked to finish 12th in the Big East Conference in a preseason poll of conference coaches.

== Recruiting ==
Pitt's 2011 women's recruiting class was ranked 18th by ESPN's Hoopgurlz and 23rd by All-Star Girls Report.

2011 Pitt Recruiting Class

Recruit	Position	Height	High school	Hometown	ESPN grade
Loliya Briggs	Guard	5'11	Potter's House Christian	Jacksonville, FL	93
Chyna Golden	Forward	6'2	Neptune High School	Bradley Beach, NJ	92
Brianna Kiesel	Point guard	5'7	Thomas R. Proctor High School	Utica, NY	93
Cora McManus	Forward	6'0	Garfield High School	Seattle, WA	82
TiAnna Porter	Forward	6'2	Henry County High School	Paris, TN	40

Overall ESPN Hoopgurlz Recruiting ranking: 18th

== Roster ==
2011–12 Pittsburgh Panthers women's basketball team
Players
Coaches

Pos.	#	Name	Height	Year	Previous school	Hometown
G	0	Asia Logan	6 ft 0 in (1.83 m)	So	Digital Harbor High School	Baltimore, MD
G	1	Loliya Briggs	5 ft 11 in (1.8 m)	Fr	Potter's House Christian Academy	Gainesville, FL
G	3	Brianna Kiesel	5 ft 6 in (1.68 m)	Fr	Thomas R. Proctor High School	Utica, NY
G	12	Abby Dowd	5 ft 9 in (1.75 m)	RS So	University of Buffalo	Tipp City, OH
G	13	Marquel Davis	5 ft 9 in (1.75 m)	So	Stafford Senior High School	Fredericksburg, VA
G	23	Ashlee Anderson	5 ft 9 in (1.75 m)	RS So	Whitney M. Young Magnet High School	Chicago, IL
G	24	Brianna Brizzi	5 ft 6 in (1.68 m)	Fr	Fauquier High School	Warrenton, VA
F	31	TiAnna Porter	6 ft 2 in (1.88 m)	Fr	Henry County High School	Paris, TN
F	33	Kyra Dunn	6 ft 2 in (1.88 m)	So	Sacramento High School	Sacramento, CA
F	34	Chyna Golden	6 ft 2 in (1.88 m)	Fr	Neptune High School	Bradley Beach, NJ
C	42	Leeza Burdgess	6 ft 5 in (1.96 m)	RS So	Miami Norland Senior High School	Miami, FL
F	51	Cora McManus	6 ft 0 in (1.83 m)	Fr	Garfield High School	Seattle, WA

Head coach

- Agnus Berenato (Mount St. Mary's)

Assistant coach(es)

- Pat Coyle (Rutgers)
- Khadija Head (Murray State)
- Mallorie Winn (Pittsburgh)

Legend

- (C) Team captain
- (S) Suspended
- (I) Ineligible
- (W) Walk-on
- Injured
- Current redshirt

Roster
Last update: 2011-10-23

== Schedule ==
Pitt's 2011-12 women's basketball schedule.

Date time, TV	Rank^{#}	Opponent^{#}	Result	Record	Site (attendance) city, state
Exhibition
Fri, Nov. 4*; 7:00 pm		Seton Hill	W 59–51		Petersen Events Center (1,871); Pittsburgh, PA
Regular season
Sat, Nov. 12*; 2:00 pm		Hampton	L 37–60	0–1	Petersen Events Center (1,637); Pittsburgh, PA
Tue, Nov. 15*; 7:00 pm		St. Francis (PA)	W 78–50	1–1	Petersen Events Center (1,537); Pittsburgh, PA
Fri, Nov. 18*; 11:00 am		Loyola (MD); School Day	W 65–59	2–1	Petersen Events Center (5,031); Pittsburgh, PA
Sun, Nov. 20*; 12:00 pm		Central Michigan	W 77–70	3–1	Petersen Events Center (1,491); Pittsburgh, PA
Sat, Nov. 26*; 2:00 pm		Drexel	L 50–71	3–2	Petersen Events Center (1,580); Pittsburgh, PA
Tue, Nov. 29*; 7:00 pm		Mount St. Mary's	W 58–45	4–2	Petersen Events Center (1,530); Pittsburgh, PA
Fri, Dec. 2*; 7:00 pm		at High Point	L 75–82	4–3	Millis Athletic Convocation Center (1,074); High Point, NC
Sun, Dec. 4*; 2:00 pm	No. 7	at Duke	L 43–92	4–4	Cameron Indoor Stadium (4,428); Durham, NC
Wed, Dec. 7; 7:00 p.m., Pitt Panthers TV / Comcast Network		No. 19 Georgetown	L 54–82	4–5 (0–1)	Petersen Events Center (1,750); Pittsburgh, PA
Sat, Dec. 10*; 2:00 pm		Valparaiso	W 65–56	5–5 (0–1)	Petersen Events Center (1,542); Pittsburgh, PA
Tue, Dec. 20*; 1:00 pm		vs. Indiana; Caribbean Classic	W 77–72 ^{OT}	6–5 (0–1)	Moon Palace Golf & Spa Resort (250); Cancún, Mexico
Wed, Dec. 21*; 3:30 pm		vs. Michigan State; Caribbean Classic	W 64–54	7–5 (0–1)	Moon Palace Golf & Spa Resort (225); Cancún, Mexico
Wed, Dec. 28*; 7:00 pm		Duquesne; City Game	L 57–70	7–6 (0–1)	Petersen Events Center (2,264); Pittsburgh, PA
Sat, Dec. 31*; 1:00 pm		Lafayette	W 74–69 ^{OT}	8–6 (0–1)	Petersen Events Center (1,531); Pittsburgh, PA
Tue, Jan. 3; 7:00 pm		at Villanova	L 62–70	8–7 (0–2)	The Pavilion (437); Villanova, PA
Sat, Jan. 7; 2:00 pm, Pitt Panthers TV / Comcast Network		Syracuse	L 60–83	8–8 (0–3)	Petersen Events Center (1,738); Pittsburgh, PA
Tue, Jan. 10; 7:00 pm, Pitt Panthers TV / Comcast Network		No. 8 Rutgers	L 39–63	8–9 (0–4)	Petersen Events Center (1,009); Pittsburgh, PA
Sat, Jan. 14; 8:00 pm		at No. 21 DePaul	L 83–86	8–10 (0–5)	McGrath-Phillips Arena (3,451); Chicago, IL
Tue, Jan. 17; 7:00 pm		at No. 2 Notre Dame	L 40–120	8–11 (0–6)	Joyce Center (8,600); Notre Dame, IN
Sat, Jan. 21; 2:00 pm, ESPN Plus, "Big East Network Game of the Week"		West Virginia; Backyard Brawl	L 43–54	8–12 (0–7)	Petersen Events Center (2,868); Pittsburgh, PA
Sat, Jan. 28; 2:00 pm		at Providence	L 50–66	8–13 (0–8)	Alumni Hall (403); Providence, RI
Tue, Jan. 31; 7:00 pm, Pitt Panthers TV / Comcast Network		St. John's	L 51–66	8–14 (0–9)	Petersen Events Center (1,726); Pittsburgh, PA
Sat, Feb. 4; 8:00 pm		at Marquette	L 48–72	8–15 (0–10)	Al McGuire Center (2,273); Milwaukee, WI
Sat, Feb. 11; 2:00 p.m.		at Cincinnati	L 57–62	8–16 (0–11)	Fifth Third Arena (1,325); Cincinnati, OH
Tue, Feb. 14; 7:00 pm, Pitt Panthers TV / Comcast Network	No. 20	Louisville	L 66–71 ^{OT}	8–17 (0–12)	Petersen Events Center (1,555); Pittsburgh, PA
Sat, Feb. 18; 7:00 p.m.		at South Florida	L 50–62	8–18 (0–13)	Bob Martinez Sports Center (679); Tampa, FL
Tue, Feb. 21; 7:00 pm, Pitt Panthers TV / Comcast Network	No. 4	Connecticut	L 37–86	8–19 (0–14)	Petersen Events Center (2,095); Pittsburgh, PA
Sat, Feb. 25; 2:00 pm, Pitt Panthers TV / Comcast Network		Seton Hall; Pink the Petersen	L 39–63	8–20 (0–15)	Petersen Events Center (2,814); Pittsburgh, PA
Mon, Feb. 27; 7:00 p.m., CBS Sports Network		at West Virginia; Backyard Brawl	L 42–60	8–21 (0–16)	WVU Coliseum (2,362); Morgantown, WV
Postseason Big East Women's Basketball Championship
Thu, Mar. 2; 2:00 p.m., BIGEAST.tv		vs. South Florida; Big East tournament	L 59–60	8–22	XL Center (7,910); Hartford, CT
*Non-conference game. ^{#}Rankings from Division I AP Poll unless otherwise noted. (#) during postseason tournaments is seed with region, if applicable. (#) Tournament seedings in parentheses. All times are in Eastern Standard Time.

== Rankings ==
Ranking movement Legend: ██ Improvement in ranking. ██ Decrease in ranking. ██ Not ranked the previous week. rv=Others receiving votes.
Poll	Pre	Wk 1	Wk 2	Wk 3	Wk 4	Wk 5	Wk 6	Wk 7	Wk 8	Wk 9	Wk 10	Wk 11	Wk 12	Wk 13	Wk 14	Wk 15	Wk 16	WK 17	Wk 18	Final
AP	rv	--	--	--	--	--	--	--	--	--	--	--	--	--	--	--	--	--	--	--
Coaches	--	--	--	--	--	--	--	--	--	--	--	--	--	--	--	--	--	--	--	--

== Awards and honors ==
- The team won the Caribbean Classic at the Moon Palace Golf & Spa Resort in Cancún, Mexico with victories over Indiana and Michigan State.

== See also ==
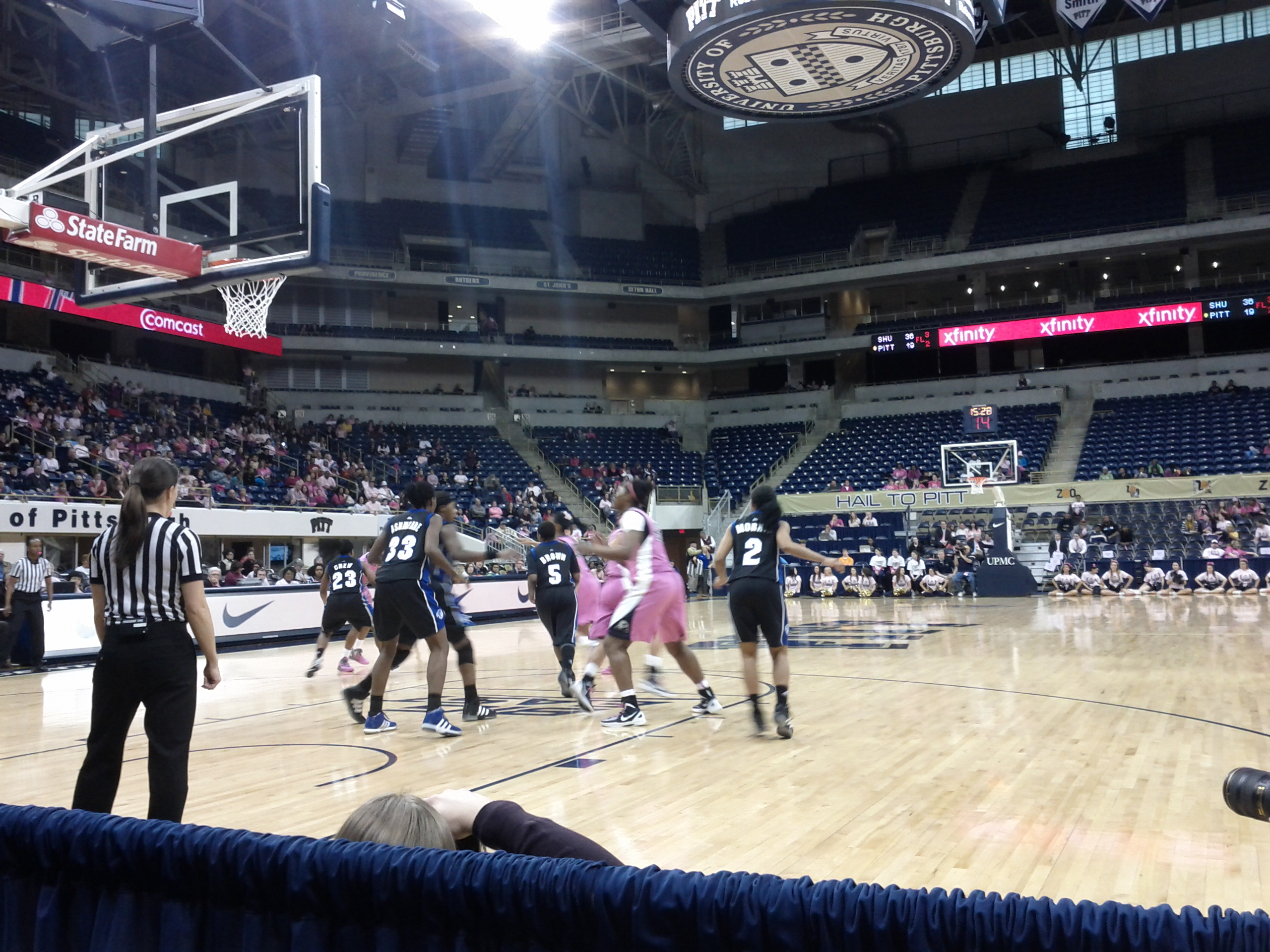
Pitt vs Seton Hall women's "Pink the Petersen" basketball game on February 25, 2012

- Pittsburgh Panthers women's basketball
- Pittsburgh Panthers men's basketball
- 2011–12 Pittsburgh Panthers men's basketball team
- Pittsburgh Panthers
- University of Pittsburgh
- Big East Conference
