= 2011–12 Connecticut Huskies women's basketball team =

Intercollegiate basketball season

2011–12 Connecticut Huskies women's basketball

Big East tournament champions World Vision Classic champions

NCAA tournament, final Four
- Conference: Big East

Ranking
- AP: No. 3
- Record: 33–5 (13–3 Big East)
- Head coach: Geno Auriemma
- Associate head coach: Chris Dailey
- Assistant coaches: Shea Ralph; Marisa Moseley
- Home arena: Harry A. Gampel Pavilion

2011–12 Big East Conference women's basketball standings
	Conf.				Overall
Team	W		L	PCT	W		L	PCT
No. 4 Notre Dame	15	–	1	.938	35	–	4	.897
No. 3 Connecticut†	13	–	3	.813	33	–	5	.868
No. 14 St. John's	13	–	3	.813	24	–	10	.706
No. T17 Georgetown	11	–	5	.688	23	–	9	.719
West Virginia	11	–	5	.688	24	–	10	.706
No. 19 Louisville	10	–	6	.625	23	–	10	.697
Rutgers	10	–	6	.625	22	–	10	.688
DePaul	9	–	7	.563	23	–	11	.676
South Florida	8	–	8	.500	19	–	16	.543
Syracuse	6	–	10	.375	22	–	15	.595
Villanova	6	–	10	.375	19	–	15	.559
Cincinnati	6	–	10	.375	16	–	16	.500
Providence	5	–	11	.313	13	–	17	.433
Marquette	4	–	12	.250	14	–	17	.452
Seton Hall	1	–	15	.063	8	–	23	.258
Pittsburgh	0	–	16	.000	8	–	22	.267
† 2012 Big East Basketball Tournament winner Rankings from AP poll

The 2011–12 Connecticut Huskies women's basketball team represented the University of Connecticut in the 2011–2012 NCAA Division I basketball season. The Huskies were coached by Geno Auriemma, and played their home games at the XL Center in Hartford, Connecticut, and on campus at the Harry A. Gampel Pavilion in Storrs, Connecticut. The Huskies are a member of the Big East Conference.

== Offseason ==
=== Italy trip ===
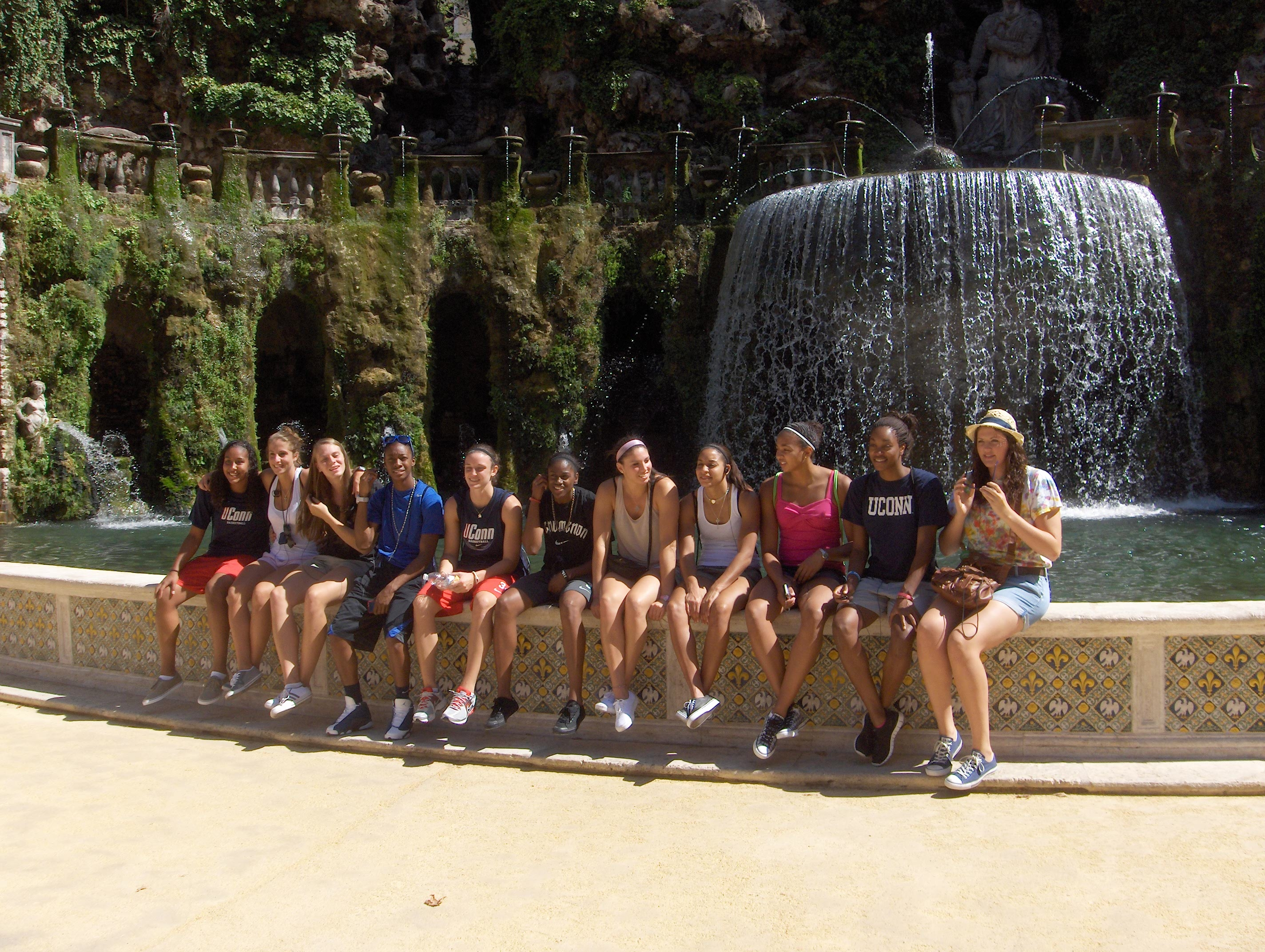
The UConn team at Villa d'Este in Italy

The UConn team traveled to Italy, for a ten-day trip, combining exhibition basketball, and sightseeing. The team, along with the coaching staff and fans left the US on 16 August 2011, and arrived in Rome the following morning. After landing, everyone boarded a bus, which took them to Basilica of Saint Paul Outside the Walls, one of the four great ancient major basilicas of Rome. The bus then continued to some of the other classic sites of Rome, including Circus Maximus and the Colosseum. The next day started with sightseeing; a visit to Vatican City, including St. Peter's Basilica, and the Sistine Chapel. In the evening, it was time for basketball, as the UConn team took on the Netherlands national team. The game was close at the half, with the Huskies up only by two points, 34–32, but UConn held the Dutch team scoreless for the first seven minutes of the second half, and won easily, 73–53.

On the third day of the trip, the team started as tourists, visiting the Pantheon and the Spanish Steps. In the evening, the team played the Italian Select team, and won easily 98–52. Incoming freshman Kaleena Mosqueda-Lewis had a stretch where she sank five consecutive three-point attempts, which extended a lead to 32 points by the end of the third quarter. The next day, the team took a bus trip to Villa d'Este, and spent the day touring the grounds of the 16th-century estate outside Rome, used as a retreat by Cardinals and Popes of the Roman Catholic Church.

The fifth day of the trip was all cultural, starting with a bus ride to Florence and a stop to your Accademia Gallery, home of many famous paintings and sculptures, the most famous of which is Michelangelo's David. The group then did a walking tour of central Florence, including a walk around the Duomo of Florence. The next stop was a visit to Galleria degli Uffizi to view the art treasures.

The sixth day featured basketball, a game between UConn and the TDT Slammers from Germany. The game was never close, and UConn ended up with a 112–36 win. Five players scored in double figures, including Kaleena Mosqueda-Lewis, Tiffany Hayes, Bria Hartley, Briana Banks, and Heather Buck. The team appreciated playing indoors; the temperature reached 112 degrees during the day. The next day featured a bus trip to Pisa, to visit the famous Leaning Tower of Pisa.

On the eighth day, the team started with a bus trip to Lake Como. The original schedule included a game against the Nigerian National team, but there were difficulties with visas, so the team did not arrive. UConn played the first quarter against the same team, the TDT Slammers, that they had played in Florence, then played the last three quarters against Castellanza Select, a local club team. Tiffany Hayes was one rebound and one assist short of a triple-double in the 116–33 against the over-matched teams. The last full day in Italy featured a boat trip on Lake Como and strolls through Bellagio. The following day, the team returned to the US.

=== Roster changes ===
Two players graduated, Lorin Dixon and Maya Moore. Although Dixon was not a starter, she averaged almost 22 minutes per game, sixth most among all players, and played a major role in the NCAA semi-final win over Georgetown. The loss of Moore is far more significant, as she was selected as the WNBA number one pick, and went on to help the Minnesota Lynx win their first WNBA championship.

Connecticut's incoming class of freshman included three players: Kaleena Mosqueda-Lewis, Brianna Banks, and Kiah Stokes. The incoming class was rated the number two recruiting class, by ESPN. Mosqueda-Lewis, from California, was the 2011 State Farm/WBCA High School Player of the Year. Banks is a left-handed guard from Georgia, with an overall rank of 24 in the 2011 class. Stokes is a 6'3 post player from Iowa, with an overall ranking of 42 within the 2011 class.

=== Pre-season ===
Connecticut played two exhibition games in the warm up to the regular season. The first was played November 3 against Assumption College, from Worcester, Massachusetts. Five UConn players scored in double digits, including Kaleena Mosqueda-Lewis who hit five of nine three-point attempts in her first game wearing a UConn uniform. UConn won the game 89–30. Six days later, UConn played Pace University from New York City. Tiffany Hayes lead all scorers with 24 points, helping the UConn team to an 85–35 win.

== Regular season ==
=== Non-conference games ===
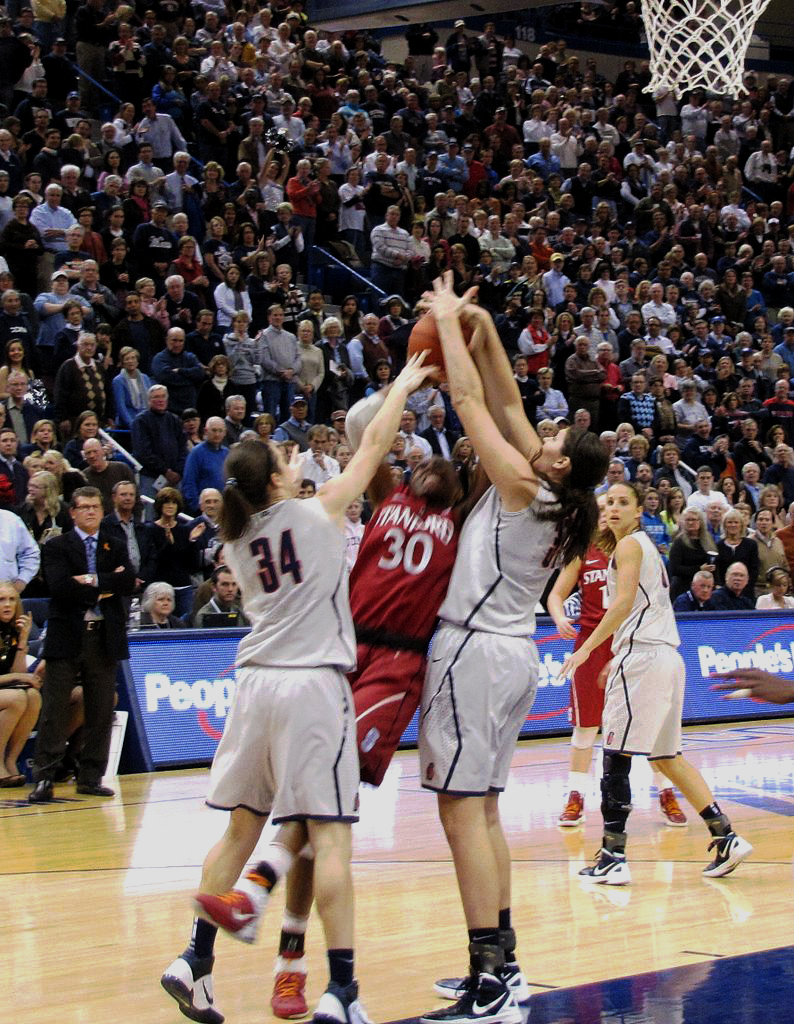
Stefanie Dolson Blocking Nneka Ogwumike

UConn opened their season at their campus home court, against Holy Cross. The game featured the return of Caroline Doty, who missed the entire previous season due to injury. Bria Hartley and Tiffany Hayes lead the scoring with 17 and 16 points respectively. The Huskies won the game 87–37. In their next game, UConn tied a record with 68 points in the first half against Pacific. The Huskies hit 71% of their basket attempts in the first half, and opened up a 43-point lead. Kaleena Mosqueda-Lewis went on to score 25 points on ten for twelve shooting. Four other Huskies scored in double digits, leading to a 112–53 victory over the Pacific team playing their 999th game.

The game against Stanford represented the first major test of the season; the Huskies were ranked #2 in the AP ratings and Stanford #3. The Stanford team ended the Connecticut winning streak at 90 games in the prior-season matchup. UConn won the game 68–58, behind 25 points by freshman Kaleena Mosqueda-Lewis, and a defensive effort that inspired coach Geno Auriemma to remark, "That's one of the better defensive efforts I’ve seen us have in a long time."

UConn held Fairleigh Dickinson University to five first-half points, the lowest point total ever scored by an opponent in a half, but the game did not earn praise from coach Auriemma, "It was the worst exhibition of basketball I've ever seen by two teams in my 27 years at UConn. They should give everyone a refund." The final score in the first game of the World Vision Classic was 74–28.

Tiffany Hayes completed a double-double, with double digits scoring and double digit rebounds, the first such accomplishment of her career, well timed because Connecticut Sun head coach Mike Thibault and assistant coach Scott Hawk were watching from the sidelines. Hayes 30 points was a career high, helping the Huskies to a 90–34 victory over the Buffalo in the second game of the World Vision Classic.

UConn beat Dayton in the final game of the World Vision Classic by a score of 78–38. The win was also a milestone; the team has now won 89 consecutive home games, an NCAA all division record, snapping the 88 game streak set by Rust College in 1989.

Bria Hartley scored 24 points on nine for twelve shooting to help the Huskies defeat Towson University 92–31 November 30 in a game at the Veterans Memorial Coliseum in Hartford. Hartley was not the only player shooting well. Heather Buck hit both shots she attempted, while Tiffany Hayes, Kaleena Mosqueda-Lewis and Stefanie Dolson each shot better than 70% from the field. The game was never competitive, and UConn would go on to win 92–31. However, the game was not without a potential downside; Caroline Doty suffered a head and neck injury in the first half sufficiently serious to keep her in the locker room for the second half, although she would return to the line-up for the next game.

The game against Texas A&M matched UConn against the second top ten team of the season. The pregame started with Stefanie Dolson leading the audience in the Pledge of Allegiance. Connecticut held the defending National Champions to just over 32% field goal shooting, leading A&M coach Gary Blair to comment, "We're not ready for this kind of competition". The Huskies won by thirty points, with a final score of 81–51.

The game between Baylor University and UConn matched up the top two ranked teams in the country. Connecticut went to halftime with a six-point lead, and built the lead to eleven in the second half, but Brittney Griner scored 25 points along with nine blocks to bring Baylor back into the lead, and Baylor went on to win the game, 66–61, handing UConn its first loss of the season.

UConn played College of Charleston in Charleston December 21, the last game before Christmas break. Although the Huskies had a 19-point lead at halftime, the 27 points scored was the lowest first half total of the season. The second half featured more scoring by Connecticut, as they scored 45 points in the second half, en route to a 72–24 victory. The win, following the loss to Baylor, represented the 665th game without back-to-back losses. The current streak stretches back to March 1993. By comparison, the second longest streak is held by Duke University, who have won 142 games without consecutive losses.

The Fairfield Stags entered the game against UConn on a four-game winning streak, but lost 93–40, representing the largest margin of defeat in a decade.

After playing five conference games, UConn hosted North Carolina, one of the three remaining non-conference games. The game against North Carolina was held on Martin Luther King day, and has been an annual occurrence for many years. In the first seven match ups between the two teams, the Tarheels won five, but the Huskies have won the last five games. Although the North Carolina team was ranked in the top 25, the UConn team handed them their worst loss in history, defeating them 86–35 for a margin of over 50 points.

=== Conference games ===
UConn opened conference play against Seton Hall. The UConn team scored the first 20 points of the game. After two free throws by Seton Hall, the huskies reeled off ten more points before giving up their first basket. Although the scoring would be roughly even from that point on, the game result was never in doubt. UConn won by a final score of 70–37.

In the first game of the new year, UConn faced West Virginia in Hartford. The UConn team won 79–60, but the contest featured many fouls—there were a total of 36 fouls called on both teams. At the press conference following the game, coach Auriemma remarked,"I'll take questions, but I sure don't have no answers."

The next game matched the number two and number three ranked teams in the country, with UConn playing at Notre Dame. The game was close throughout, with UConn holding a slim two-point lead in the final minute, but Notre Dame forced overtime, and out scored the Huskies by seven points in the extra period, to win 74–67. It was the first Huskies regular season Big East loss after 57 consecutive victories. The Huskies rebounded from their loss with a win over Providence, in which every one of the eleven players scored. The team was shooting over 70% from the floor in the first half, and went on to win 96–35.

In their next game, against Villanova, the home team had an early lead at 15–11 when the Huskies scored 15 consecutive points as part of a 21–2 run to take a large lead. Villanova got with five points in the second half, but the Huskies responded with a 17–5 run, helping them to a comfortable margin, and a 72–49 victory.

UConn returned to conference play with their match up against Cincinnati, coached by Jamelle Elliott, former long-time assistant at Connecticut. Although the Bearcats had started the season with six straight victories, they were now playing tougher competition, and had lost eight of their last eleven games. Dayeesha Hollins scored the first 13 points for Cincinnati, and was single-handedly keeping the game in reach, but UConn pulled away, and won easily 80–37.

The next game featured a ranked opponent in DePaul, although since losing senior Keisha Hampton, they aren’t the same team that earned the ranking. Oft-injured Caroline Doty came out of the game with a knee injury in the first half and did not return to the game. The Huskies had three scoring runs of double-digit consecutive points to help put away the Blue Demons, and come away with the win, 88–44. UConn then traveled to Syracuse, where the Orange kept the game close in the first half, ending the half only seven points behind the Huskies. However, behind a career-high 35 points from Tiffany Hayes, the UConn team pulled away in the second half to a 95–54 victory.

The UConn team played the University of South Florida in front of 13,627 fans on Saturday, January 28. The date is Jasper Howard's birthday, a cornerback for the UConn football team, before being fatally stabbed in 2009. He was a friend of Tiffany Hayes, who brought a hat of his to the media session and spoke of his inspiration. The USF team has never beaten the Huskies, but was behind only by three points at halftime, and scored early in the second half to cut the margin to a single point. However, Hayes and Stefanie Dolson combined to give the team a large lead. Hayes scored 33 points, and Dolson added 22 to help the team to a 77–62 final score. Hayes has scored 68 points in the last two games, setting an all-time UConn record for scoring in consecutive games.

UConn next faced Rutgers, who were playing without star player Khadijah Rushdan, who was sitting out recovering from a concussion. Rutgers Hall of Fame head coach C. Vivian Stringer is known for her defense, so her comments about the UConn defense "They play the passing lanes and pressure the ball. They play personnel as well as anyone I’ve seen. They do a great job." were respected. UConn held Rutgers to 34 points, the fewest ever scored in a game between the two teams. UConn won the game 66–34, extending the consecutive home winning streak to 98 games.

The next game pitted UConn against a Louisville team with a twelve-game home winning streak, who bought 16,418 fans to the arena. UConn started slowly, and Bria Hartley picked up two early fouls. The team outscored the Cardinals 24–9 in the last twelve minutes of the first half, opening up a lead that stretched to more than 20 at one point. However, the Cardinals fought back in the second half, at one time cutting the lead to six, but held on and won with a final score of 56–46.

In the next game, against Georgetown, the Hoyas had an early 12–11 lead, but then the defense of the Huskies went to work and held the Georgetown team to a game total of 38 points. Kaleena Mosqueda-Lewis, who had been struggling with her shooting, scored a team high 23 points, helping to lead the team to an 80–38 final score.

=== Roster ===
2011–12 Connecticut Huskies women's basketball team
Players
Coaches

Pos.	#	Name	Height	Year	Previous school	Hometown
G	13	Brianna Banks	5 ft 9 in (1.75 m)	Fr	Fayette County	Newnan, Georgia
F/C	32	Heather Buck	6 ft 3 in (1.91 m)	RS Jr	Stonington	Stonington, Connecticut
C	31	Stefanie Dolson	6 ft 5 in (1.96 m)	So	Minisink Valley	Port Jervis, New York
G	5	Caroline Doty (C)	5 ft 10 in (1.78 m)	RS Jr	Germantown Academy	Doylestown, Pennsylvania
F	12	Lauren Engeln	5 ft 11 in (1.8 m)	So	Laguna Hills	Laguna Hills, California
G	34	Kelly Faris (C)	5 ft 11 in (1.8 m)	Jr	Heritage Christian	Plainfield, Indiana
G	14	Bria Hartley	5 ft 7 in (1.7 m)	So	North Babylon	North Babylon, New York
G	3	Tiffany Hayes (C)	5 ft 10 in (1.78 m)	Sr	Winter Haven	Lakeland, Florida
F	25	Michala Johnson	6 ft 3 in (1.91 m)	So	Montini	Bellwood, Illinois
F	23	Kaleena Mosqueda-Lewis	—	Fr	Mater Dei	Anaheim Hills, California
C	41	Kiah Stokes	6 ft 3 in (1.91 m)	Fr	Linn-Mar	Marion, Iowa

Head coach

Geno Auriemma

Assistant coach(es)

Chris Dailey
Shea Ralph
Marisa Moseley

Legend

- (C) Team captain
- (S) Suspended
- (I) Ineligible
- (W) Walk-on
- Injured
- Current redshirt

Roster
Last update: 2013-08-23

=== Schedule ===
The XL Center is the Veterans Memorial Coliseum at XL Center

	Date	Time (EST)	Opponent / Event	Location	UConn points	Opp. points	Record	Home win streak
	11/3/2011	7:30 p.m.	vs. Assumption ε	Storrs, Conn. (Gampel Pavilion)	89	30	–	–
	11/9/2011	7:00 p.m.	vs. Pace University ε	Hartford, Conn. (XL Center)	85	35	–	–
1	11/13/2011	2:00 p.m.	vs. Holy Cross	Storrs, Conn. (Gampel Pavilion)	77	37	1–0	84
2	11/15/2011	7:30 p.m.	vs. Pacific	Storrs, Conn. (Gampel Pavilion)	112	53	2–0	85
3	11/21/2011	7:30 p.m.	vs. Stanford	Hartford, Conn. (XL Center)	68	58	3–0	86
4	11/25/2011	7:30 p.m.	vs. Fairleigh Dickinson	Storrs, Conn. (Gampel Pavilion)	74	28	4–0	87
5	11/26/2011	7:30 p.m.	vs. Buffalo	Storrs, Conn. (Gampel Pavilion)	90	34	5–0	88
6	11/27/2011	4:30 p.m.	vs. Dayton	Storrs, Conn. (Gampel Pavilion)	78	38	6–0	89
7	11/30/2011	7:00 p.m.	vs. Towson	Hartford, Conn. (XL Center)	92	31	7–0	90
8	12/6/2011	7:00 p.m.	vs. Texas A&M (Jimmy V Classic)	Hartford, Conn. (XL Center)	81	51	8–0	91
9	12/9/2011	7:00 p.m.	at Seton Hall β	South Orange, N.J.	70	37	9–0	–
10	12/18/2011	8:30 p.m.	at Baylor	Waco, Texas	61	66	9–1	–
11	12/21/2011	7:00 p.m.	at College of Charleston	Charleston, South Carolina	72	24	10–1	–
12	12/29/2011	7:30 p.m.	vs. Fairfield	Storrs, Conn. (Gampel Pavilion)	93	40	11–1	92
13	1/4/2012	7:00 p.m.	vs. West Virginia β	Hartford, Conn. (XL Center)	79	60	12–1	93
14	1/7/2012	4:00 p.m.	at Notre Dame β	South Bend, Ind.	67	74	12–2	-
15	1/10/2012	7:00 p.m.	vs. Providence β	Hartford, Conn. (XL Center)	96	35	13–2	94;
16	1/14/2012	2:00 p.m.	at Villanova β	Philadelphia, Pa.	72	49	14–2	-
17	1/16/2012	7:00 p.m.	vs. North Carolina	Storrs, Conn. (Gampel Pavilion)	86	35	15–2	95
18	1/19/2012	7:30 p.m.	vs. Cincinnati β	Storrs, Conn. (Gampel Pavilion)	80	37	16–2	96
19	1/21/2012	8:00 p.m.	at DePaul β	Chicago, Ill. (McGrath-Phillips Arena)	88	44	17–2	-
20	1/25/2012	7:00 p.m.	at Syracuse β	Syracuse, N.Y.	95	54	18–2	-
21	1/28/2012	1:00 p.m.	vs. USF β	Hartford, Conn. (XL Center)	77	62	19–2	97
22	1/30/2012	7:00 p.m.	at Duke	Durham, North Carolina	51	45	20–2	-
23	2/4/2012	7:00 p.m.	vs. Rutgers β	Storrs, Conn. (Gampel Pavilion)	66	34	21–2	98
24	2/7/2012	7:00 p.m.	at Louisville β	Louisville, Kỳ.	56	46	22–2	-
25	2/11/2012	4:00 p.m.	vs. Georgetown β	Storrs, Conn. (Gampel Pavilion)	80	38	23–2	99
26	2/13/2012	9:00 p.m.	at Oklahoma	Norman, Okla.	73	55	24–2	-
27	2/18/2012	7:00 p.m.	vs. St. John's β	Storrs, Conn. (Gampel Pavilion)	56	57	24–3	-
28	2/21/2012	7:00 p.m.	at Pittsburgh β	Pittsburgh, Pa.	86	37	25–3	-
29	2/25/2012	5:00 p.m.	at Marquette β	Milwaukee, Wis.	85	45	26–3	-
30	2/27/2012	9:00 p.m.	vs. Notre Dame β	Hartford, Conn. (XL Center)	59	72	26-4	-

ε Exhibition

β Big East

== Big East tournament ==
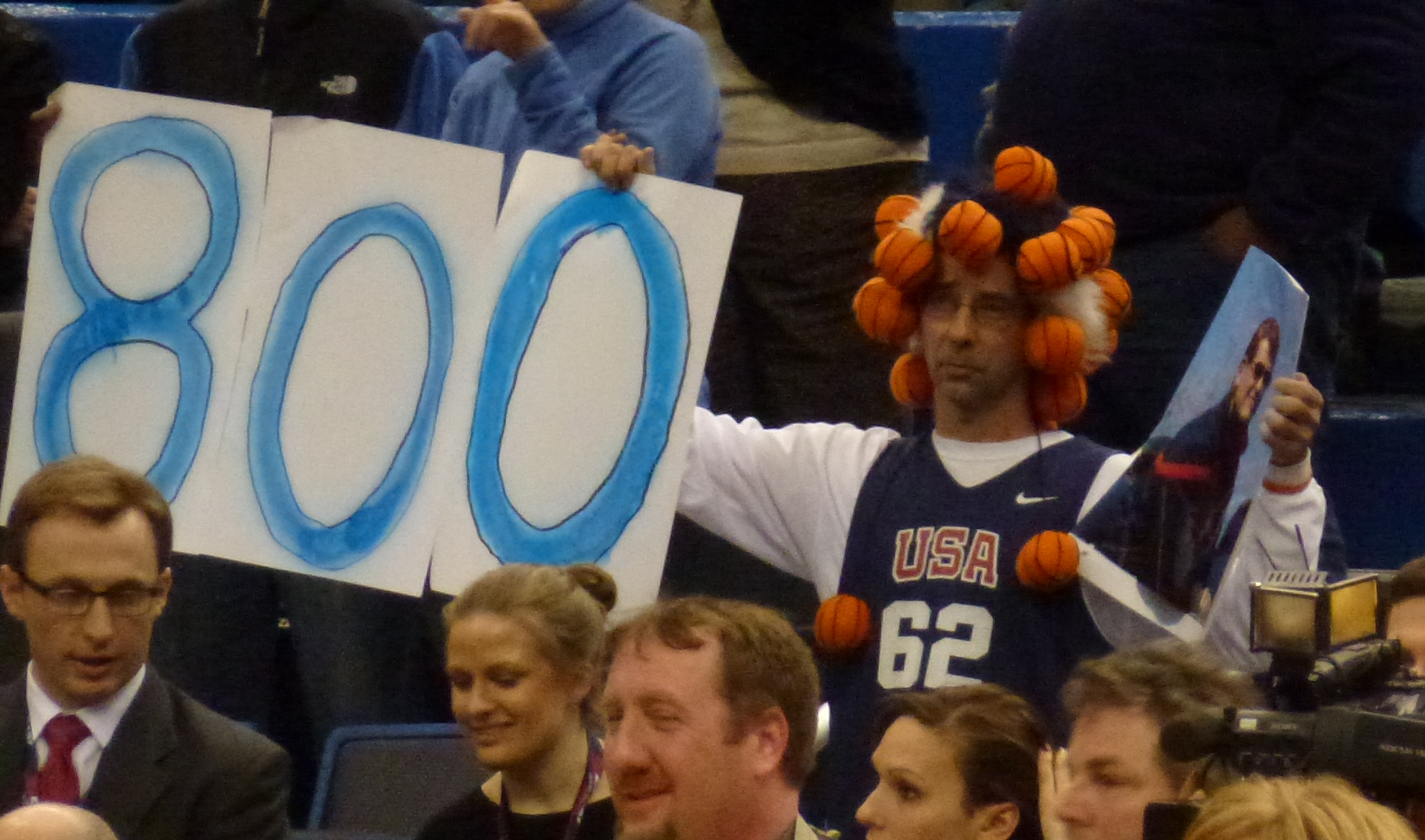
Auriemma's 800th career victory

The 2012 Big East tournament was held at the XL Center. The opening rounds proceeded largely as expected, with the Marquette victory over Cincinnati the only upset in the first two rounds. Both Villanova and South Florida won by a single point each.

In the quarterfinals, second seeded St. Johns beat Louisville in Overtime 68–61. Both Notre Dame and Connecticut won by 15, with Notre Dame beating DePaul 69–54, and UConn beating Rutgers in a low scoring game, 49–34. The defensive battle of the day was between West Virginia and Georgetown. Both teams were 11–5 in conference, but Georgetown was the higher seed, and nationally ranked. West Virginia achieved a mild upset, in a very low scoring game 39–32.

Neither semifinal game was close. Both games featured a match up between a top-ranked team which had lost to an unranked (at the time) team. Notre Dame had only one loss in Big East play, but in the rematch, handled West Virginia easily, winning by a margin of 28 points, 73–45. Connecticut, which had lost to St. Johns a week earlier, ending a 99-game home win streak, beat the Red Storm by 31 points, 74–43.

The finals featured Notre Dame and Connecticut, the same teams as had played in the 2011 Championship game. Connecticut won that game, but Notre Dame had won three consecutive match ups since that game, defeating Connecticut in the semifinals of the Final Four, and the two regular season match ups in 2012. In the rematch, Connecticut opened up a ten-point lead in the first half, but Notre Dame responded, and cut the margin to a single point at halftime. Connecticut only scored two points in the opening of the second half, and fans remembered that UConn had gone almost nine minutes without scoring in the previous match up. However, UConn went on a run, helped by two three-pointers from Kelly Faris and 19 points from Mosqueda -Lewis, and went on to win the 2012 Big East tournament championship 63–54. Stefanie Dolson and Bria Hartley were named to the All-Tournament team, and Mosqueda-Lewis was named the Most Outstanding Player of the Tournament.

The victory was also a personal milestone for coach Auriemma, representing the 800th win of his career. No one in NCAA basketball history has reached 800 wins in fewer total games.

Date time, TV	Rank^{#}	Opponent^{#}	Result	Record	High points	High rebounds	High assists	Site (attendance) city, state
4 March 2012; 8:00 pm, ESPNU	No. 4	No. 19 Rutgers; Big East women's basketball tournament	W 49–34	27-4	17 – Kaleena Mosqueda-Lewis	8 – Stefanie Dolson	5 – Tiffany Hayes	XL Center (8661); Hartford, Connecticut
5 March 2012; 8:00 pm, ESPNU	No. 4	St. John's; Big East women's basketball tournament	W 74–43	28-4	23 – Stefanie Dolson	6 – Stefanie Dolson, Tiffany Hayes, Kelly Faris	7 – Kelly Faris	XL Center (8731); Hartford, Connecticut
6 March 2012; 7:00 pm, ESPN	No. 4	No. 3 Notre Dame; Big East women's basketball tournament	W 63–54	29-4	19 – Kaleena Mosqueda-Lewis	11 – Devereaux Peters	4 – Skyler Diggins	XL Center (9227); Hartford, Connecticut
*Non-conference game. ^{#}Rankings from Coaches' Poll. (#) Tournament seedings in parentheses. All times are in Eastern Time.

== NCAA tournament ==
=== Prairie View ===
Connecticut started the first game like they have in so many other first-round games, looking like a potential blowout. UConn scored the first eight points, before Prairie View hit an awkward three-pointer off the glass. However, The Lady Panthers would stay relatively close in the first half, cutting the lead to eight well into the game. Senior Tiffany Hayes, nursing a stress injury, would pay 17 minutes in the first half, but would sit out the second half. Freshman Kaleena Mosqueda-Lewis stepped up, scoring 21 points, tying a UConn record for points in their first NCAA appearance, held by former UConn player and current Cincinnati coach Jamelle Elliott. UConn stretched out the lead in the second half and won 83–47.

=== Kansas State ===
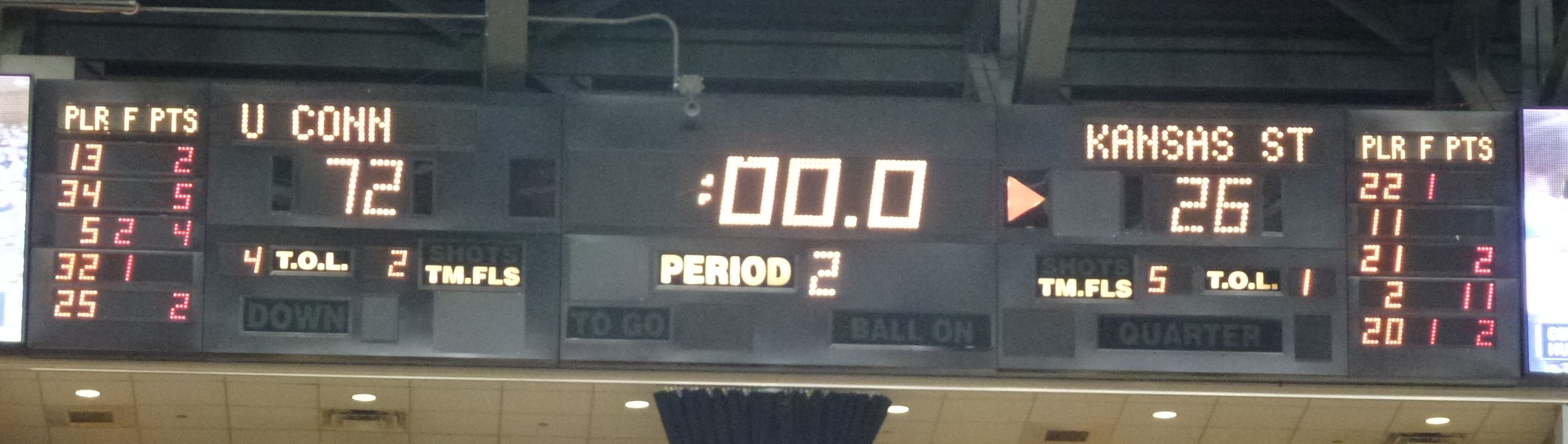
Scoreboard, reflecting defensive record

After Connecticut scored the first basket of the game, Kansas State responded with a three-pointer taking a 3–2 lead. It would be their last point for over eleven minutes, and their last lead of the game. UConn played a game described as "nearly...flawless defensive game". The Wildcats scored just before halftime to increase their point total to ten, narrowly missing a tie for fewest points in the first half of an NCAA tournament game. They would not be so fortunate in avoiding the complete game record, set by Southern when they scored only 27 points in a game. The Kansas State team reached 26 points with almost three minutes left to play, but would not score again. The Huskies won 72–26.

=== Penn State ===
Dolson hits a foul line jumper against Penn State

Penn State's Alex Bentley was asked about UConn after their win over Kansas State, and she said "I don't think [the Huskies] played against a real, true scoring team". UConn held the two guards, Bentley and Lucas to seven made shots on 31 attempts. In one notable sequence, Kelly Faris leaped to block a three-point attempt by Lucas. Caroline Doty grabbed the ball, and, with her back to her own basket and closely covered, leapt and spun to heave the ball to a streaking Faris, who had to be fouled hard to prevent a score. Bria Hartley would lead all scorers with 20 points, while Kaleena Mosqueda-Lewis had a double-double in points and rebounds off the bench. The game was the 100th NCAA tournament game in UConn history. UConn has a record of 84–16 in NCAA tournament games.

=== Kentucky ===
Connecticut opened with a 9–0 run, but Kentucky did not quit, and responded, first closing the gap, then taking a small lead. When the Wildcats hit two free throws with 2.1 seconds in the first half to make the score 39 all, it looked like the score would be tied at halftime, but Tiffany Hayes hit a streaking Kelly Faris who put in a shot at the halftime buzzer to take a two-point lead. In the second half, the Huskies expanded the margin to 20 points, then ended with a 15-point victory, 80–65, to propel the UConn team to their fifth consecutive Final Four, tying an NCAA record.

=== Notre Dame ===
Connecticut met Notre Dame for the third time this season. Notre Dame won by seven points on their home court, then won by twenty points at the XL Center in Hartford.UConn responded with a nine-point victory in the Big East championship game.

The Huskies held a slim three-point lead at halftime, while both teams took turns leading in the second half. Notre dame had a four-point lead with two minutes to go when Kelly Faris hit a layup to cut the margin to two, then sank two free throws to tie it with 44 seconds to go, then stole the ball and sank two more free throws to give UConn a two-point lead at the 11 second mark. Skyler Diggins missed a jump shot, but Natalie Novasel grabbed the rebound and hit a layup to send the game to overtime.

In the overtime, Diggins hit a three-pointer, then Brittany Mallory hit back-to-back three-pointers to give the Irish enough points for the win. Notre Dame won the game, 83–75.

Date time, TV	Rank^{#}	Opponent^{#}	Result	Record	High points	High rebounds	High assists	Site (attendance) city, state
17 March 2012*; 1:30 pm, ESPN2	No. 3	vs. Prairie View A&M; First Round	W 83–47	30-4	21 – Kaleena Mosqueda-Lewis	7 – Kaleena Mosqueda-Lewis, Kiah Stokes	8 – Kelly Faris	Arena at Harbor Yard; Bridgeport, Connecticut
19 March 2012*; 7:00 pm, ESPN2	No. 3	vs. Kansas State; Second Round	W 72–26	31–4	16 – Bria Hartley	9 – Tiffany Hayes, Kiah Stokes	4 – Tiffany Hayes, Kelly Faris	Arena at Harbor Yard; Bridgeport, Connecticut
25 March 2012*; 4:34 pm, ESPN2	No. 3	vs. Penn state regional semi-final	W 77-59	32-4	20 – Bria Hartley	11 – Kaleena Mosqueda-Lewis	4 – Bria Hartley, Kelly Faris	Ryan Center; Kingston, Rhode Island
27 March 2012*; 7:00 pm, ESPN	No. 3	vs. No. 11 Kentucky regional final	W 80–65	33–4	22 – Tiffany Hayes	8 – Stefanie Dolson, Tiffany Hayes	5 – Stefanie Dolson, Kelly Faris	Ryan Center; Kingston, Rhode Island
1 April 2012*; 6:30 pm, ESPN	No. 3	vs. No. 4 Notre Dame; Final Four semi-final	L 75–83 ^{OT}	33–5	20 – Stefanie Dolson, Natalie Novosel (ND)	12 – Devereaux Peters(ND)	5 – Kelly Faris, Brittany Mallory	Pepsi Center; Denver
*Non-conference game. ^{#}Rankings from Coaches' Poll. (#) Tournament seedings in parentheses. All times are in Eastern Time.

== Awards and honors ==
=== Team ===
- Team of the Year—The USA Women's U19 World Championship Team was honored by USA Basketball as the 2011 team of the year. The team included several people connected to the UConn program. The head coach of the team was Jennifer Rizzotti, current University of Hartford hear coach and former UConn player. Players on the team included current UConn players Bria Hartley, Stefanie Dolson and Kaleena Mosqueda-Lewis. Also on the team were Morgan Tuck and Breanna Stewart, both of whom have signed Letters of Intent to enroll at Connecticut. The current UConn team members were honored before the Cincinnati game on 19 January.

=== Geno Auriemma ===
- Legends of Coaching Award—Auriemma will receive the Legends of Coaching Award recognizing his lifetime of achievement as a coach. The award will be presented in April, 2012.
- 2012 Olympic Coach—Auriemma will serve as the coach of the USA Basketball team, representing the US at the 2012 Olympics. He will be assisted by Doug Bruno, Jennifer Gillom, and Marynell Meadors, who had also served as assistants for the US entry in the 2010 World Championships.
- Auriemma reached his 800th career victory in the finals of the Big East tournament. He has reached the milestone faster than any other coach in NCAA basketball history.

== Team players drafted into the WNBA ==
Round	Pick	Player	NBA Club
2	14	Tiffany Hayes	Atlanta Dream

== See also ==
- 2011–12 Connecticut Huskies men's basketball team
