= Tiffany Hayes =

American-Azerbaijani basketball player (born 1989)

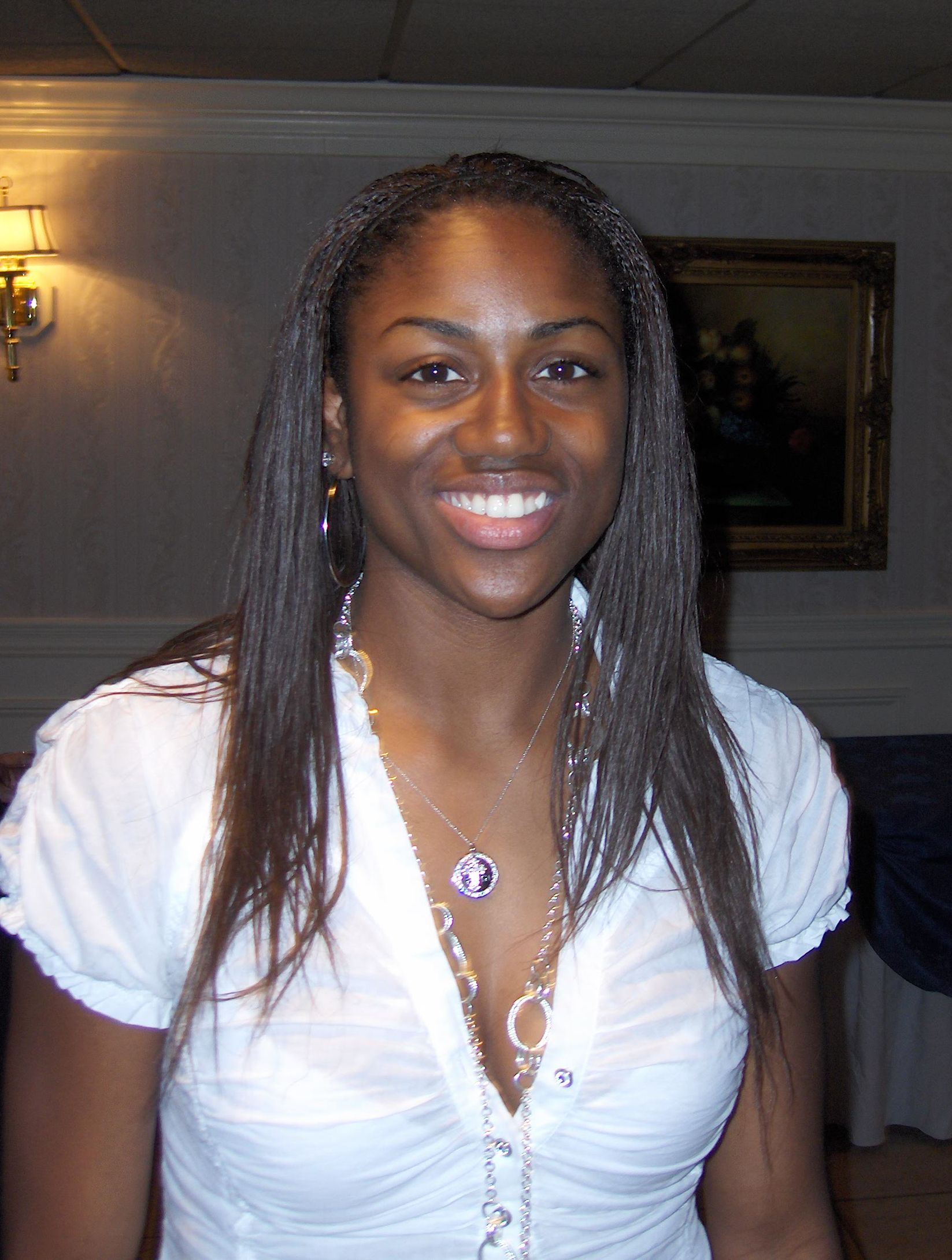
- Hayes in 2009

No. 15 – Golden State Valkyries
- Position: Shooting guard
- League: WNBA

Personal information
- Born: September 20, 1989 (age 37) Winter Haven, Florida, U.S.
- Listed height: 5 ft 10 in (1.78 m)
- Listed weight: 155 lb (70 kg)

Career information
- High school: Winter Haven (Winter Haven, Florida)
- College: UConn (2008–2012)
- WNBA draft: 2012: 2nd round, 14th overall pick
- Drafted by: Atlanta Dream
- Playing career: 2012–present

Career history
- 2012–2019, 2021–2022: Atlanta Dream
- 2012–2013: Hapoel Rishon LeZion
- 2013–2014: Beşiktaş JK
- 2014: America de Recife
- 2015–2016: Yakın Doğu Üniversitesi
- 2016–2017: Mersin Büyükşehir Belediyespor
- 2017–2018: Maccabi Bnot Ashdod
- 2019–2021: Perfumerías Avenida
- 2021–2022: Çukurova Basketbol
- 2023: Connecticut Sun
- 2023–2024: Shanghai Swordfish
- 2024: Las Vegas Aces
- 2025: Laces BC
- 2025–present: Golden State Valkyries
- 2025: ÇBK Mersin

Career highlights
- WNBA champion (2026); WNBA Sixth Woman of the Year (2024); All-WNBA First Team (2018); WNBA All-Defensive Second Team (2018); WNBA All-Star (2017); WNBA All-Rookie Team (2012); 2× NCAA champion (2009, 2010); Third-team All-American – AP (2012); 2× First-team All-Big East (2011, 2012); Big East All-Freshman Team (2009); McDonald's All-American (2008)
- Stats at WNBA.com
- Stats at Basketball Reference
Medals
Women's basketball
Representing United States
World University Games
Gold medal – first place	2009 Belgrade	Team
Women's 3x3 Basketball
Representing Azerbaijan
Islamic Solidarity Games
Gold medal – first place	2021 Konya	2026 WNBA Champion

Renara Tiffany Hayes (born September 20, 1989) is an American-Azerbaijani professional basketball player for the Golden State Valkyries of the Women's National Basketball Association (WNBA), for ÇBK Mersin of the Turkish Super League, and for the Phantom of Unrivaled. Hayes played college basketball for the Connecticut Huskies, playing for the 2009 and 2010 NCAA National Champions. Hayes is also the 2026 WNBA Champion with the Golden State Valkyries.

== Early life ==
Hayes was born on September 20, 1989, in Winter Haven, Florida, to Dorothy and Renard Hayes.

Hayes played basketball for Winter Haven High School. The team compiled a 117–9 record during her career, and won the state championship in 2004 and 2007. She was the team's leading scorer, with an average of 18.3 points per game.

Hayes helped lead the AAU team Essence to the 2007 National Championship.

Hayes was invited to the 2007 Youth Development Festival, a USA Basketball sponsored event for elite high school sophomores and juniors at the U.S. Olympic Training Center. The 2007 event featured three US teams and one representing Brazil. Hayes was leading scorer of the White USA team, which won five of its games to clinch the gold medal. Hoopgulrz.com named Hayes the outstanding player of the Festival.

Hayes participated in the 2008 Nike SPARQ Training "My Better" Championship event. She finished the preliminary round as one of the top 22 of the 3,000 high school athletes competing. The top finishers were flown to Nike World Headquarters for the finals. Hayes finished second among all females competing.

== College career ==
Hayes played for the University of Connecticut Huskies. She knew about the program when she was a little girl, and had interest in UConn since childhood. UConn became interested in Hayes in 2006, when an assistant coach, Tonya Cardoza, saw her playing AAU ball. Despite heavy recruitment by many other schools, UConn made an offer when Hayes was a junior, and Hayes committed to attend Connecticut.

She asked to wear number 3, the number most recently worn by UConn legend Diana Taurasi. Hayes was not a starter at the beginning of the season, but after teammate Caroline Doty was injured, she stepped into the starting lineup. Her career high-scoring game was against California in the regional semifinal of the NCAA Championship. Connecticut won every game of the season by double digits, but found itself in the unusual position of being eight points behind in the California game. Hayes scored 28 points to help lead the team to victory.

Hayes was invited to the tryouts for the USA Women's World University Games Team. She made the team as the youngest player and only freshman. The team had a 7–0 record and won a gold medal in Belgrade, Serbia.

On February 5, 2011, the Connecticut Huskies beat DePaul 89–66. This was the 100th win in Hayes's college career, and occurred in her 101st game, making her the fastest player in NCAA basketball history to reach 100 wins. Hayes scored 35 points against Syracuse on January 26, setting a career high, and followed that up with 33 points against South Florida two days later. The 68 combined points in back-to-back games is the highest point total in consecutive games by any Connecticut player in history.

== Professional career ==
=== WNBA ===
Hayes was selected by the Atlanta Dream as the second pick in the second round, the 14th overall pick of the 2012 WNBA draft. In her rookie season, she played 34 games with 17 starts while averaging 8.6 PPG as a reserve on the Dream's roster. She was named to the WNBA All-Rookie team.

In her second season, Hayes played 23 games with 4 starts and averaged 11.3 PPG. That season, the Dream advanced to the 2013 WNBA Finals, but were swept by the Minnesota Lynx.

In 2014, Hayes officially became the starting shooting guard for the Dream and averaged 12.9 PPG.

In 2016, Hayes re-signed with the Dream to a multi-year deal. During the season, she averaged 15 PPG. In a loss to the Los Angeles Sparks, Hayes scored a career-high 32 points. Her stellar performance continued into the playoffs, where she scored a playoff career-high 30 points in the second-round elimination game against the Chicago Sky in a losing effort.

In 2017, with the team's leading scorer, Angel McCoughtry, resting during the season, Hayes took on more scoring responsibility and continued to improve offensively. She was voted into the 2017 WNBA All-Star Game, her first all-star game appearance. By the end of the season, Hayes put up a career-high scoring average of 16.3 PPG, but the Dream finished with a 12–22 record, missing the playoffs.

In 2018, with McCoughtry's return, the Dream was back in the mix for a playoff spot and emerged as a title contender. Hayes was voted into the 2018 WNBA All-Star Game. She finished the season with a new career high in scoring. On July 17, Hayes hit a game winner from beyond half-court as time expired to beat the Connecticut Sun on the road 86-83. The Dream finished 23–11 with the number 2 seed in the league, receiving a double-bye to the semi-finals. McCoughtry was sidelined with a knee injury and the Dream were eliminated by the Washington Mystics in five games.

On August 10, 2019, Hayes scored a new-career high 34 points in an 87–82 loss to the Indiana Fever. With McCoughtry sidelined for the season with a knee injury, the Dream finished with a league-worst 8–26 record.

On December 13, 2023, Hayes announced her retirement from the WNBA.

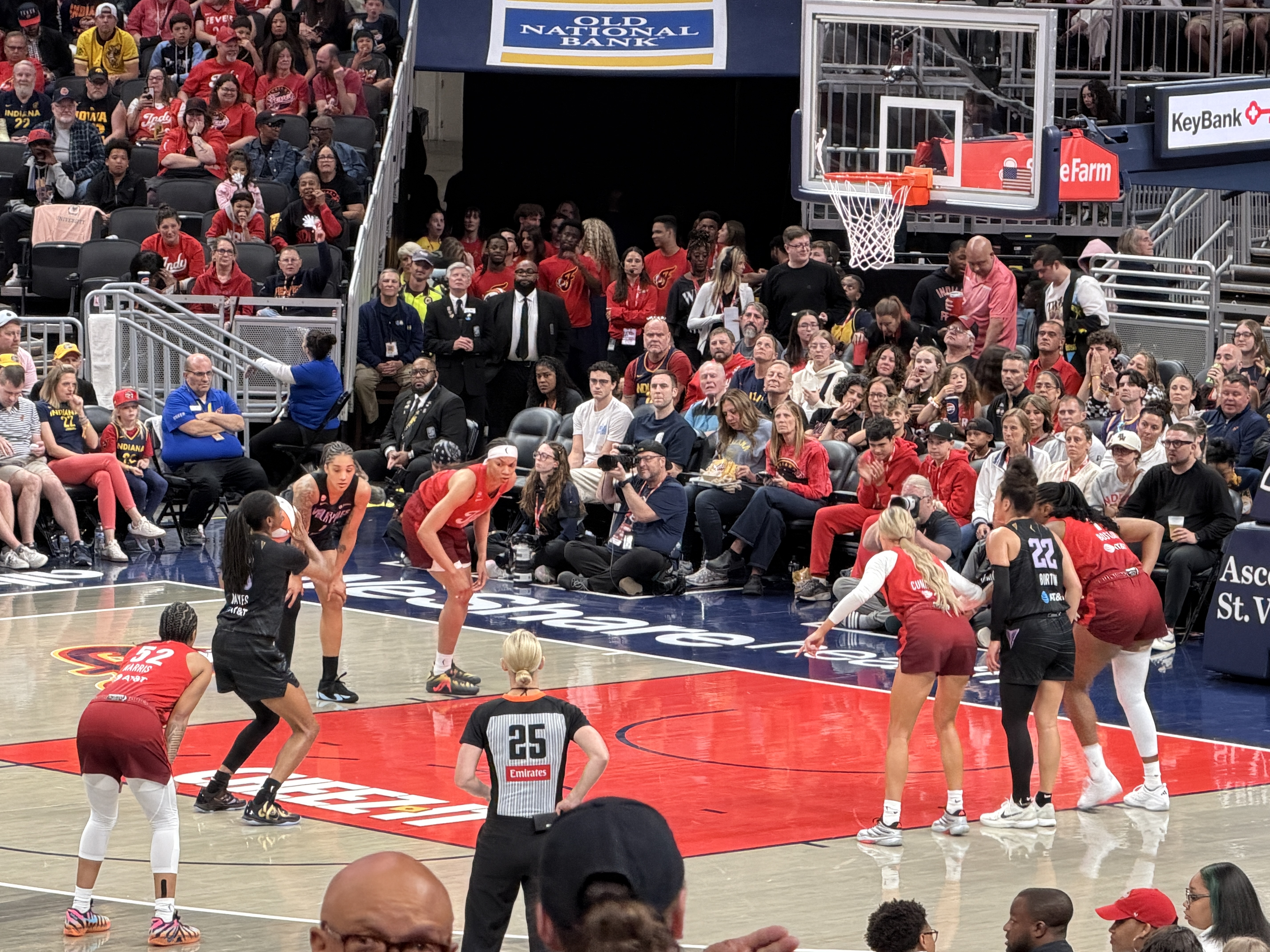
Hayes throwing a free throw during a Valkyries game against the Indiana Fever at Gainbridge Fieldhouse in Indianapolis, Indiana in 2026.

On May 31, 2024, it was announced that the Las Vegas Aces had signed Hayes out of retirement. On October 4, the WNBA announced Hayes was the Sixth Player of the Year, the award for the top player coming off the bench.

On February 6, 2025, Hayes signed a one-year contract with the Golden State Valkyries. On August 11, during a game against the Connecticut Sun, she passed Sheryl Swoopes on the WNBA's all-time scoring list. On October 31, 2026, Hayes became a WNBA champion with the Golden State Valkyries.

=== Overseas ===
In the 2012-13 off-season, Hayes played in the Israeli League for Hapoel Rishon LeZion. In the 2013-14 off-season, she played in Turkey for Beşiktaş JK and in Brazil for America de Recife. In the 2015-16 off-season, Hayes played in Turkey once again for Yakin Dogu. She signed with Mersin BSB S.K. for the 2016-17 off-season.

In the 2017-18 off–season, Hayes played in the Israeli League for Maccabi Bnot Ashdod. She signed with Perfumerías Avenida of the Spanish League for the 2019-20 off-season and renewed for 2020–2021. For the 2025–26 season, she signed with Çukurova Basketbol.

=== Unrivaled ===
On September 27, 2024, it was announced that Hayes would appear and play in the inaugural season of Unrivaled, the women's 3-on-3 basketball league founded by Napheesa Collier and Breanna Stewart. She played for the Laces in the 2025 season and for Phantom BC in the 2026 season.

== National team career ==
Hayes was a part of the United States women's national basketball team that won gold at the 2009 Summer Universiade in Belgrade, Serbia. She also appeared in the exhibition match victory against China in 2018.

In 2015, Hayes became an Azerbaijani citizen, and competed for the Azerbaijan women's national basketball team at the 2015 European Games held in Baku, Azerbaijan in June. She competed in the 3x3 basketball event, and her team made the quarterfinals.

Hayes also participated in the 2024 Summer Olympics for the Azerbaijan women's 3x3 basketball team.

== Career statistics ==
Legend
GP	Games played	GS	Games started	MPG	Minutes per game	RPG	Rebounds per game
APG	Assists per game	SPG	Steals per game	BPG	Blocks per game	PPG	Points per game
TO	Turnovers per game	FG%	Field-goal percentage	3P%	3-point field-goal percentage	FT%	Free-throw percentage
**Bold**	Career best	°	League leader

*	Denotes seasons in which Hayes won an NCAA Championship

=== WNBA ===
==== Regular season ====
WNBA regular season statistics
Year	Team	GP	GS	MPG	FG%	3P%	FT%	RPG	APG	SPG	BPG	TO	PPG
2012	Atlanta	34	17	23.1	.390	.273	.786	3.1	2.1	.8	**.3**	1.5	8.6
2013	Atlanta	23	4	22.3	.406	.377	.745	3.7	1.7	1.2	.1	1.7	11.3
2014	Atlanta	34	32	28.4	.464	.357	.760	3.0	2.5	1.0	.2	1.2	12.9
2015	Atlanta	28	27	29.9	.392	.274	.805	3.0	2.2	1.0	**.3**	1.6	12.9
2016	Atlanta	33	33	**30.8**	.441	.274	.804	3.4	2.4	1.2	.2	1.7	15.0
2017	Atlanta	33	33	30.0	.436	.372	**.854**	**3.8**	2.4	1.2	.2	1.8	16.3
2018	Atlanta	31	29	28.9	.441	.321	.817	3.6	2.7	1.1	.2	1.6	**17.2**
2019	Atlanta	29	29	28.2	.393	.308	.764	3.0	2.8	1.0	.2	2.4	14.7
2020	Did not play (opted out)												
2021	Atlanta	21	19	28.3	.438	.405	.853	3.2	**3.0**	**1.6**	.2	1.5	14.7
2022	Atlanta	11	11	27.5	**.545**	**.429**	.683	3.6	2.1	.7	.1	2.0	16.2
2023	Connecticut	40	**40**	27.1	.476	.366	.778	3.0	2.6	.9	.1	1.4	12.1
2024	Las Vegas	33	5	21.5	.500	.402	.714	2.8	2.1	.8	**.3**	**.8**	9.5
2025	Golden State	26	24	26.9	.418	.406	.800	**3.8**	**3.0**	.5	.2	1.9	11.7
2026	Golden State	**42**	4	17.0	.460	.283	.783	2.0	2.5	.8	.2	1.2	9.0
**Career**	14 years, 4 teams	418	307	26.1	.439	.341	.790	3.2	2.5	1.0	.2	1.6	12.7
**Career**	All-Star	1	1	22.3	.400	.000	—	5.0	4.0	1.0	.0	2.0	12.0

==== Playoffs ====
WNBA playoff statistics
Year	Team	GP	GS	MPG	FG%	3P%	FT%	RPG	APG	SPG	BPG	TO	PPG
2012	Atlanta	3	0	16.3	.364	.333	**1.000**	2.3	1.7	1.6	**.3**	1.6	4.3
2013	Atlanta	**8**	6	28.4	.390	.353	.767	4.5	1.9	.6	.0	1.3	12.4
2014	Atlanta	3	3	31.1	.481	.333	.900	3.0	2.0	.3	**.3**	1.3	12.7
2016	Atlanta	1	1	**36.7**	**.588**	.429	.875	6.0	2.0	1.0	.0	2.0	**30.0**
2018	Atlanta	5	5	33.6	.444	.375	.800	**6.2**	**3.4**	1.4	.2	2.0	16.4
2023	Connecticut	7	**7**	26.1	.527	.484	.875	3.4	1.6	.6	**.3**	**1.0**	14.3
2024	Las Vegas	6	0	21.7	.512	**.500**	.813	3.5	2.8	**1.8**	.2	**1.0**	10.5
2025	Golden State	Did not play (injury)											
**Career**	7 years, 3 teams	33	22	26.9	.467	.411	.822	4.1	2.2	1.0	.2	1.4	12.9

=== College ===
NCAA statistics
Year	Team	GP	GS	MPG	FG%	3P%	FT%	RPG	APG	SPG	BPG	TO	PPG
2008–09*	UConn	**39**	—	25.7	.458	.374	.759	4.0	2.6	1.1	**.4**	**1.5**	8.4
2009–10*	UConn	**39**	37	26.4	.439	.321	.734	3.3	3.0	1.0	**.4**	2.2	10.2
2010–11	UConn	38	**38**	**31.7**	.435	.349	.775	4.6	**3.7**	1.4	**.4**	2.4	13.6
2011–12	UConn	38	**38**	30.2	**.503**	**.407**	**.808**	**5.8**	3.3	**2.3**	.3	2.6	**14.7**
**Career**		154	113	28.4	.460	.360	.774	4.4	3.1	1.4	.4	2.1	11.7

== Awards and honors ==
- 2007—MVP, Nike Nationals, HoopGurlz.com
- 2007—First Team, All-State 5A (Florida)
- 2008—McDonald's All-America
- 2008—Parade Magazine All-America
- 2009–10—Wade Watch
- 2010–11—Wade Watch
- 2011—First Team All Big East
- 2012—WNBA All-Rookie Team
- 2024-WNBA Sixth Woman of the Year
- 2025 WNBA Cares Community Assist Award
- 2026 WNBA Champion

== See also ==
- Connecticut Huskies women's basketball
- 2008–09 Connecticut Huskies women's basketball team
- 2009–10 Connecticut Huskies women's basketball team
