= 2011–12 Notre Dame Fighting Irish women's basketball team =

Intercollegiate basketball season

2011–12 Notre Dame Fighting Irish women's basketball

Big East regular season champions

NCAA tournament, Runner-Up
- Conference: Big East Conference

Ranking
- Coaches: No. 2
- AP: No. 4
- Record: 35–4 (15–1 Big East)
- Head coach: Muffet McGraw (25th season)
- Assistant coaches: Carol Owens; Beth Cunningham; Niele Ivey
- Home arena: Edmund P. Joyce Center

2011–12 Big East Conference women's basketball standings
| | Conf. | | | | Overall |
| Team | W | | L | PCT | W | | L | PCT |
|---|---|---|---|---|---|---|---|---|
| No. 4 Notre Dame | 15 | – | 1 | .938 | 35 | – | 4 | .897 |
| No. 3 Connecticut† | 13 | – | 3 | .813 | 33 | – | 5 | .868 |
| No. 14 St. John's | 13 | – | 3 | .813 | 24 | – | 10 | .706 |
| No. T17 Georgetown | 11 | – | 5 | .688 | 23 | – | 9 | .719 |
| West Virginia | 11 | – | 5 | .688 | 24 | – | 10 | .706 |
| No. 19 Louisville | 10 | – | 6 | .625 | 23 | – | 10 | .697 |
| Rutgers | 10 | – | 6 | .625 | 22 | – | 10 | .688 |
| DePaul | 9 | – | 7 | .563 | 23 | – | 11 | .676 |
| South Florida | 8 | – | 8 | .500 | 19 | – | 16 | .543 |
| Syracuse | 6 | – | 10 | .375 | 22 | – | 15 | .595 |
| Villanova | 6 | – | 10 | .375 | 19 | – | 15 | .559 |
| Cincinnati | 6 | – | 10 | .375 | 16 | – | 16 | .500 |
| Providence | 5 | – | 11 | .313 | 13 | – | 17 | .433 |
| Marquette | 4 | – | 12 | .250 | 14 | – | 17 | .452 |
| Seton Hall | 1 | – | 15 | .063 | 8 | – | 23 | .258 |
| Pittsburgh | 0 | – | 16 | .000 | 8 | – | 22 | .267 |
† 2012 Big East Basketball Tournament winner Rankings from AP poll

The 2011–12 Notre Dame Fighting Irish women's basketball team represented University of Notre Dame during the 2011–12 NCAA Division I women's basketball season. The Fighting Irish, led by twenty-fifth year head coach Muffet McGraw, played their home games at the Purcell Pavilion at the Joyce Center and were 1st year members of the Big East Conference. They finished the season with 35–4 overall, 15–1 in Big East play to win the Big East regular season title. They earned an at-large bid to the 2012 NCAA Division I women's basketball tournament where they defeated Liberty in the first round, California in the second round, St. Bonaventure in the Sweet Sixteen, and Maryland in the Elite Eight to make it to their fourth Final Four, where they defeated UConn. In the championship game they lost to Baylor, 80–61. The Lady Bears became the first team to finish a season 40–0.

== Roster ==
2011–12 Notre Dame Fighting Irish women's basketball team
Players
Coaches

| Pos. | # | Name | Height | Year | Previous school | Hometown |
|---|---|---|---|---|---|---|
| G | 3 | Whitney Holloway | 5 ft 4 in (1.63 m) | Fr | Montini Catholic | Plainfield, IL |
| G | 4 | Skylar Diggins | 5 ft 9 in (1.75 m) | Jr | Washington | South Bend, IN |
| G | 5 | Madison Cable | 5 ft 11 in (1.8 m) | Fr | Mt. Lebanon | Mt. Lebanon, PA |
| F | 11 | Natalie Achonwa | 6 ft 3 in (1.91 m) | So | St. Mary's Catholic | Guelph, ON |
| G | 12 | Fraderic Miller | 5 ft 10 in (1.78 m) | Sr | Marist School | Atlanta, GA |
| F | 14 | Devereaux Peters | 6 ft 2 in (1.88 m) | | Fenwick | Chicago, IL |
| G | 15 | Kaila Turner | 5 ft 8 in (1.73 m) | Jr | Marian Catholic | Joliet, IL |
| G | 21 | Natalie Novosel | 5 ft 11 in (1.8 m) | Sr | Lexington Catholic | Lexington, KY |
| G | 23 | Kayla McBride | 5 ft 11 in (1.8 m) | So | Villa Maria Academy | Erie, PA |
| | 32 | Brittany Mallory | 5 ft 10 in (1.78 m) | | McDonogh School | Baltimore, MD |
| F | 34 | Markisha Wright | 6 ft 2 in (1.88 m) | Fr | Des Moines East | Des Moines, IA |
| F | 44 | Ariel Braker | 6 ft 1 in (1.85 m) | So | Grosse Pointe North | Grosse Pointe Woods, MI |

Head coach

Muffet McGraw

Assistant coach(es)

Carol Owens
Beth Cunningham
Niele Ivey

Legend

- (C) Team captain
- (S) Suspended
- (I) Ineligible
- (W) Walk-on
- Injured
- Current redshirt

Roster

== Schedule ==
| Date time, TV | Rank^{#} | Opponent^{#} | Result | Record | Site (attendance) city, state |
Exhibition
| Nov 11, 2011* | No. 2 | Akron | W 81–61 | 1–0 | |
| Nov 13, 2011* | No. 2 | Indiana State | W 99–34 | 2–0 | |
| Nov 17, 2011* | No. 2 | Hartford | W 98–43 | 3–0 | |
| Nov 20, 2011*; CBS Sports | No. 2 | at No. 1 Baylor | L 81–94 | 3–1 | Ferrell Center (9,477); Waco, Texas |
Regular season
| Feb 27, 2012 | No. 3 | at No. 4 Connecticut | W 72–59 | 28–2 (15–1) | XL Center; Hartford, Connecticut |
Big East tournament
| Mar 4, 2012* | No. 4 | vs. DePaul; Quarterfinals | W 69–54 | 29–2 | XL Center; Hartford, Connecticut |
| Mar 5, 2012* | No. 4 | vs. West Virginia; Semifinals | W 73–45 | 30–2 | XL Center; Hartford, Connecticut |
| Mar 6, 2012* | No. 4 | at No. 3 Connecticut; Championship game | L 54–63 | 30–3 | XL Center; Hartford, Connecticut |
NCAA tournament
| Mar 18, 2012* | No. 4 | Liberty; First round | W 74–43 | 31–3 | Joyce Center; Notre Dame, Indiana |
| Mar 20, 2012* | No. 4 | California; Second round | W 73–62 | 32–3 | Joyce Center; Notre Dame, Indiana |
| Mar 25, 2012* | No. 4 | vs. No. 21 St. Bonaventure; Regional Semifinal – Sweet Sixteen | W 79–35 | 33–3 | RBC Center; Raleigh, North Carolina |
| Mar 27, 2012* | No. 4 | vs. No. 5 Maryland; Regional Final – Elite Eight | W 80–49 | 34–3 | RBC Center; Raleigh, North Carolina |
| Apr 1, 2012* | No. 4 | vs. No. 3 Connecticut; National semifinal – Final Four | W 83–75 ^{OT} | 35–3 | The Pepsi Center; Denver, Colorado |
| Apr 3, 2012* | No. 4 | vs. No. 1 Baylor; National Championship | L 61–80 | 35–4 | The Pepsi Center; Denver, Colorado |
*Non-conference game. ^{#}Rankings from AP Poll. (#) Tournament seedings in parentheses. All times are in Eastern Time.

== See also ==
2011–12 Notre Dame Fighting Irish men's basketball team
