= Trend (surname) =

Trend can be a surname. Notable people with this surname include:

- Burke Trend (1914–1987), British civil servant and rector
- Jess Trend (born 1991), female Australian rules footballer
- Jim Trend (1878–1954), Australian rules footballer
- John Brande Trend (1887–1958), British Hispanist and professor of Spanish
- Michael Trend (born 1952), British journalist and politician
- Peter Trend (born 1974), English cricketer
