= Trends (American magazine) =

American society and lifestyle magazine

Trends is an American society, philanthropy, fashion and lifestyle magazine published in Arizona. Created by Danny Medina in 1982, it was purchased by Bill Dougherty in 2001, who now serves as its publisher.

Trends has a 501(c)(3) arm, the Trends Charitable Fund (TCF), which raises money for underserved women's and children's charitable organizations. It is run by volunteers and a board of directors made of Trendsetters, women who have been recognized since 1985 for civic and charitable work in the Phoenix community.

Organizations that have received grant money from the Trends Charitable Fund include Florence Crittenton, Sunshine Acres, Teen Lifeline, Jewish Family & Children's Services, Sojourner Center, Crisis Nursery, St. Mary's Food Bank, Family Promise of Phoenix, Southwest Center for HIV/AIDS, Teach for America, Phoenix Day, Phoenix Rescue Mission, Arizona Children Association, Aid to Adopt Special Children, Desert Mission, UMOM, Homeward Bound, Waste Not, Arizona Friends of Foster Children Foundation (AFFCF) Greater Phoenix Youth at Risk and Rosie's House.
