= Girls Talk =

Girls Talk may refer to:

- "Girls Talk" (Elvis Costello song), first recorded by Dave Edmunds and later by Linda Ronstadt
- "Girls Talk" (Garbage song)
- Girl's Talk, an album by Kara
- "Girl's Talk", a song by Loona from Chuu

== See also ==
- Girl Talk (disambiguation)
