= Trendz =

Trendz may refer to:

- Trendz (album), a 1993 album by Trends of Culture
- Trendz (group), a South Korean boy band
