= Trend line =

Trend line can refer to:

- A linear regression in statistics
- The result of trend estimation in statistics
- Trend line (technical analysis), a tool in technical analysis
