= Jim Trend =

Australian rules footballer

Personal information
- Full name: James Trend
- Born: 2 November 1878
- Died: 17 February 1954 (aged 75)
- Original team: Boroondara

Playing career^{1}
Years	Club	Games (Goals)
1905	Melbourne	3 (3)
- ^{1} Playing statistics correct to the end of 1905.

James Trend (2 November 1878 – 17 February 1954) was an Australian rules footballer who played with Melbourne in the Victorian Football League (VFL).
