= Phoenix Rescue Mission =

Charitable organization in Arizona

- Formation: 1952
- Location: Phoenix, Arizona
- Services: Homeless Services, Addiction Recovery, Employment Assistance, Service Referrals
- Members: Citygate Network, Evangelical Council for Financial Accountability
- CEO: Ken Brissa
- Website: http://phoenixrescuemission.org
- Formerly called: Phoenix Gospel Mission

The Phoenix Rescue Mission ("The Mission") is a charitable organization that offers a number of Christ-centered program and services for men, women, and children in the Phoenix, Arizona metro area who are struggling with homelessness, drug addiction, and trauma. Phoenix Rescue Mission is a member of the Citygate Network and is accredited by the ECFA.

== History ==
The Phoenix Rescue Mission was founded in 1952 as the Phoenix Gospel Mission by LeRoy and Grace Davidson, a 28-year-old house painter living in Phoenix. On its opening day, about 15 migrant workers came and sat on wooden boards supported by paint cans for a basic meal and to hear the gospel message. The Phoenix Gospel Mission was incorporated in 1954 by six local businessmen at a building on South 3rd Street, the current site of Chase Field. The Mission moved to the current site of Comerica Theatre in 1969, which at the time was the Utah Hotel at 440 W. Washington Street. At this location, the Mission offered showers, three meals every day, clothing, Sunday school, food boxes, and six beds for addiction recovery. Urban renewal forced the Mission to relocate to the current site of the Community Services Center at 1801 S. 35th Avenue in 1991.

Phoenix Gospel Mission officially changed its name to Phoenix Rescue Mission in 1997 and its outreach services continued to expand, now providing thousands of individuals food and clothing.

In 2011, the Mission opened the Changing Lives Center, a specialized facility for near homeless, recovering, and/or traumatized women and their children. The Changing Lives Center was and continues to be the only faith-based recovery program in the region offering long-term, comprehensive services to women and their children.

== Programs and Services ==
=== Emergency Services ===
The Mission serves nearly 1,000 meals daily at the Community Services Center at 1801 S. 35th Avenue in Phoenix. The Center has over 100 beds designated for men's emergency shelter.

=== The Changing Lives Center for Women and Children ===
The Changing Lives Center, which opened in 2011, is the only faith-based recovery program in the region offering long-term, comprehensive services to near homeless, recovering, and traumatized women and their children. The Center has a capacity of housing 160-170 women and children. In the 12-to-18-month program, women receive life skills, education, counseling, and ultimately become self-sufficient through career assessment and job placement.

=== Addiction Recovery for Men ===
The 150-bed addiction recovery program for men is a 12-to-18-month, Christ-centered program featuring Bible study, counseling, addiction recovery education, relapse prevention, life-skills development, vocational training, on-site work therapy, discipleship, group meetings, church attendance, and support group meetings.

=== Vocational Development ===
Phoenix Rescue Mission's vocational development program is available both to guests of the mission and to members of the community who are in need. The program places program clients and other guests from the general public in permanent employment through basic literacy skills, financial coaching, GED preparation, career preparation, resume building, interview training, and job placement.

=== Hope Coach Mobile Outreach ===
The Mission's Hope Coach vans offer water, hygiene kits, socks, and other items to homeless men, women, and families without shelter. Staff help volunteers learn about homelessness, see oft-ignored neighborhoods, and encourage people on the streets to come to the Mission for help.

=== Community engagement ===
The Community Engagement department provides food boxes, clothing, Christmas gifts, Easter baskets, and school supplies to the working poor.
