= Caroline Doty =

American basketball player (born 1989)

Personal information
- Born: August 15, 1989 (age 36) Clearwater, Florida, U.S.
- Listed height: 5 ft 10 in (1.78 m)
- Listed weight: 150 lb (68 kg)

Career information
- High school: Germantown Academy (Fort Washington, Pennsylvania)
- College: UConn (2008–2013)
- Position: Guard

Career highlights
- 3× NCAA champion (2009, 2010, 2013)

Caroline Marie Doty (born August 15, 1989) is an American basketball player who played guard for the UConn women's basketball team. She won the 2009 NCAA National Championship, 2010 NCAA National Championship, and 2013 NCAA National Championship during her time with UConn.

== Early life ==
Doty is the daughter of Kevin Doty and Sue Frekot. Doty has two brothers, Kevin and Michael, and a younger sister, Brooke.

== High school ==
Doty attended Germantown Academy in Fort Washington, Pennsylvania. During her junior year, she averaged 16.2 points, 8.2 rebounds and 3.0 assists and was named to the 2007 Parade Magazine second-team All-American and 2007 Boo Williams All-Tournament Team. Doty led Germantown Academy to three straight Inter-AC League Championships (2005–07) and also guided the Patriots to a pair of Inter AC Tournament titles. She was named to the 2007 2A First Team All-State, was the 2007 Pennsylvania State Player of the Year and 2006–07 Times Herald Girls Basketball Player of the Year. Doty was pursued by many of the top names in women's basketball. She was ranked the sixth best high school guard by one rating service. She took visits to five schools, including Connecticut, Notre Dame and Maryland. She played multiple sports, including basketball and soccer. In Doty's senior year, she tore an ACL in a soccer game, ending both her soccer and basketball seasons.

== University of Connecticut career ==
=== Freshman year ===
Doty started her first 17 games as a freshman at shooting guard. She posted double-figure points six times and also broke the UConn record for consecutive three-point field goals by going a perfect 6-of-6 from beyond the arc while racking up 18 points in win over No. 4/4 Oklahoma (November 30) but suffered a torn ACL in her left knee on January 17 vs. Syracuse, forcing her to miss the remainder of the season, and had a successful surgery on January 22, 2009.

=== Sophomore year ===
In her sophomore year, Doty played and started in 38 of UConn's 39 games, was the fifth leading scorer on the team at 6.8 points per game and second on the squad with 136 assists (3.5 apg.) She scored in double figures 11 times and dished-out at least four assists on 17 occasions, One of the top free throw shooters on the team, Doty converted on 75.7 percent of her attempts from the charity stripe, while connecting on 49 3-pointers, which was the second-highest total on the team and posted a 1.92 assist-to-turnover ratio, which ranked No. 24 in the country She scored eight points, chased down five rebounds and buried a pair of treys in the national championship victory over Stanford. Doty helped her team win the 2010 National Championship.

=== Junior year ===
Doty was forced to sit out the entire season due to a knee injury and became a red shirt. As a red shirt junior, Doty started and played in 37 of UConn's 38 games and scored in double figures in seven games. She hit 35 3-pointers while shooting 33.3 percent from behind the arc, and averaged 5.0 points and 2.2 rebounds in her 20.6 minutes per game. She registered 1.9 assists per game and concluded the season with a 1.5 assist-to-turnover ratio.

=== Senior year ===
As a five-year senior, Doty played and started in 32 of the 38 games for UConn. She averaged 3.2 points, 2.0 rebounds and helped her team win the 2013 National Championship, the third national championship for Doty. Doty helped UConn to a 182–11 record over her three-year career, which included five Final Four appearances and three National Championships.

== Connecticut statistics ==
Legend
GP	Games played	GS	Games started	MPG	Minutes per game
FG%	Field goal percentage	3P%	3-point field goal percentage	FT%	Free throw percentage
RPG	Rebounds per game	APG	Assists per game	SPG	Steals per game
BPG	Blocks per game	PPG	Points per game	**Bold**	Career high

Year	Team	GP	Points	FG%	3P%	FT%	RPG	APG	SPG	BPG	PPG
2008–09	Connecticut	17	147	44.8	40.0	86.7	3.4	1.9	0.9	0.2	8.6
2009–10	Connecticut	39	265	38.5	32.2	75.7	2.5	3.5	1.2	0.2	6.8
2011–12	Connecticut	37	184	35.5	33.3	73.1	2.2	1.9	1.3	0.2	5.0
2012–13	Connecticut	38	121	36.4	33.7	60.0	2.0	2.1	0.7	0.3	3.2
Career	Connecticut	131	717	38.4	34.2	75.9	2.4	2.4	1.0	0.2	5.5
