= Girl Talk Inc. =

Student-to-student mentoring program

Girl Talk Inc. is an international student-to-student mentoring program designed for high school girls to mentor and be positive role models for middle school girls. Girl Talk Inc. is a non-profit organization with headquarters in Atlanta, Georgia. Haley Kilpatrick founded the mentoring program as a high school student in Albany, Georgia during the fall of 2002, and the program has more than 375 chapters in 48 states across the United States as well as in the Virgin Islands and Zambia. The mentoring program has reached more than 30,000 middle school girls.

== Girl Talk's mission ==
Girl Talk is designed to build self-esteem and encourage individuality in middle school girls. In the weekly chapter meetings, the high school Girl Talk leader picks topics to discuss for lessons that are designed to build girls' character and intelligence. Girl Talk sessions are guided by the T.H.I.N.K. acronym, which stands for True, Honest, Important, Necessary, and Kind, and refers to how people should converse. Girl Talk chapters are formed by female high school students, mothers, teachers or counselors, who visit the program's website and fill in a form requesting the creation of a new chapter. The Girl Talk Chapter Coordinator Erin Patterson then contacts those parties.

== History ==
Haley Kilpatrick founded Girl Talk at Deerfield-Windsor School in Albany, GA, in the fall of 2002 because of her own middle school experiences. Kilpatrick had a hard time adjusting in middle school and often felt left out. While in high school Kilpatrick led a very active and social life, but she noticed that almost all her friends encountered similar experiences throughout middle school. Thus, Kilpatrick decided she wanted to make a difference and create a student-to-student mentoring group to help ameliorate the middle-school experience for girls. After an initial rejection of the program by her school's headmaster, Kilpatrick revised her proposal and was eventually successful in being able to use her school as place to hold the inaugural weekly Girl Talk meetings. Kilpatrick felt that, "if young girls were taken care of emotionally that they would excel academically.". As Girl Talk continued to grow, Kilpatrick knew that she would need help in funding her new non-profit. So, she approached Brown Bag Marketing Inc. of Atlanta, Georgia and hoped they could help her take Girl Talk to the next level. "I basically told them that I knew that I was on the brink of something huge," Kilpatrick said. "I was young, but I convinced them that if they believed in me, I would put them on the map." Brown Bag Marketing Inc. joined the Girl Talk team and donated thousands of dollars to build their website. Girl Talk has secured a $100,000 grant from Bell Capitol management, an Atlanta area investment advisor. Kilpatrick said the new funds will be used for starter kits for existing Girl Talk chapters, which include journals, T-shirts and a copy of the "Girl Talk Handbook." Since the founding of Girl Talk in the fall of 2002, it has become one of the fastest growing nonprofit mentoring programs in the United States.

== Founder ==
Haley Kilpatrick is a native of Albany, Georgia who currently resides in Atlanta, Georgia and is the President and Executive Director for Girl Talk Inc. In 2007, Kilpatrick graduated from Kennesaw State University with a Bachelor of Science degree in Communications. She has traveled all across the country, promoting Girl Talk in dozens of national and local media outlets, including appearances on the Today Show, NBC Nightly News, CNN, HLN, The Montel Williams Show and The Oprah Winfrey Show.

== Awards and honors ==
Kilpatrick was named one of Atlanta's Power 30 under 30, as well as one of People Magazine's "All-Stars Among Us."

Other awards and recognition:

- Atlanta Business Chronicle's Top 40 Under 40 (Youngest Ever to Receive Award)
- CNN's "Young People Who Rock"
- CosmoGirl of the Year (CosmoGirl Magazine)
- $10,000 Maybelline Scholarship Recipient
- Atlanta Falcon's Community Quarterback Award

== See also ==
- Youth mentoring
