= 2011–12 NCAA Division I women's basketball rankings =

- Season: 2011–12
- NCAA Tournament: 2012
- Preseason No. 1: Baylor
- NCAA Tournament Champions: Baylor
NCAA Division I women's basketball rankings


Two human polls comprise the 2011–12 NCAA Division I women's basketball rankings, the AP Poll and the Coaches Poll, in addition to various publications' preseason polls. The AP poll is a poll of sportswriters, while the USA Today Coaches' Poll is a poll of college coaches. The AP conducts polls weekly through the end of the regular season and conference play, while the Coaches poll conducts a final, post-NCAA tournament poll as well.

== Legend ==
–	Not ranked
(#)	Ranking

== AP Poll ==
Team	29-Oct	14-Nov	21-Nov	28-Nov	5-Dec	12-Dec	19-Dec	26-Dec	2-Jan	9-Jan	16-Jan	23-Jan	30-Jan	6-Feb	13-Feb	20-Feb	27-Feb	5-Mar	12-Mar
Baylor	1	1	1	1	1	1	1	1	1	1	1	1	1	1	1	1	1	1	1
Stanford	5	5	3	5	4	4	4	4	4	4	4	4	4	4	3	2	2	2	2
UConn	4	4	2	2	2	2	2	2	2	3	3	3	3	3	2	4	4	3	3
Notre Dame	2	2	4	3	3	3	3	3	3	2	2	2	2	2	4	3	3	4	4
Maryland	10	10	8	6	5	5	5	5	5	5	8	8	9	8	8	6	6	5	5
Duke	8	8	7	7	6	9	9	8	7	7	5	5	5	5	5	7	5	6	6
Delaware	–	–	–	24	22	21	19	19	21	20	16	15	12	12	10	9	8	7	7
Miami (FL)	7	7	9	9	9	7	7	12	12	13	11	10	7	6	6	5	7	8	8
Tennessee	3	3	6	8	7	6	6	7	6	6	9	7	8	11	13	10	13	9	9
Green Bay	–	–	–	23	21	19	18	18	17	14	12	12	10	9	11	12	11	10	10
Penn St.	11	11	17	16	17	16	16	16	22	–	22	18	19	18	12	11	9	11	11
Kentucky	17	17	14	12	10	8	8	6	11	9	6	6	6	7	7	13	10	12	12
Purdue	16	16	15	13	12	22	20	20	18	17	13	13	15	16	17	22	21	13	13
St. John’s (NY)	–	–	–	–	–	–	–	–	–	–	–	–	–	–	–	20	18	14	14
Georgia Tech	–	–	–	–	–	–	–	–	–	–	–	–	24	T22	20	17	15	15	15
Ohio St.	24	24	18	17	13	12	11	9	8	11	10	9	11	10	9	8	14	16	16
Louisville	9	9	11	10	15	14	14	14	14	16	18	16	14	20	19	16	20	19	19
Georgia	12	12	10	15	14	13	13	17	16	19	15	17	21	21	18	18	16	20	20
St. Bonaventure	–	–	–	–	–	–	–	–	–	–	–	–	–	25	22	19	19	21	21
Texas A&M	6	6	5	4	8	10	10	10	9	12	14	14	18	15	14	14	17	22	22
Rutgers	15	15	13	11	11	11	12	11	10	8	7	11	13	17	21	24	23	23	23
Princeton	–	–	–	–	–	–	–	–	–	–	–	–	–	–	–	–	–	24	24
South Carolina	–	–	–	–	–	–	–	–	–	24	–	–	–	24	25	–	25	25	25
BYU	–	–	–	–	–	–	–	–	–	–	–	T23	22	–	23	–	–	–	–
DePaul	18	18	23	22	20	23	21	21	20	21	21	T23	–	–	24	21	–	–	–
Florida St.	21	21	–	–	–	–	–	–	–	–	–	–	–	–	–	–	–	–	–
Gonzaga	–	–	–	–	–	–	–	–	–	23	–	22	20	19	–	25	22	–	–
Kansas St.	–	–	–	–	–	–	–	–	–	–	23	–	–	–	–	–	–	–	–
LSU	20	20	20	–	–	–	–	–	–	–	–	–	–	–	–	–	–	–	–
North Carolina	19	19	16	14	18	18	23	24	25	22	24	25	23	T22	–	–	–	–	–
Oklahoma	13	13	12	18	24	–	–	–	–	–	–	–	–	–	–	–	–	–	–
Southern California	23	23	–	–	–	–	–	–	–	–	–	–	–	–	–	–	–	–	–
Texas	–	–	24	21	25	24	22	22	23	–	–	–	–	–	–	–	–	–	–
Texas Tech	25	25	19	19	16	15	15	13	13	10	17	21	25	–	–	–	–	–	–
UCLA	22	22	25	–	–	–	–	–	–	–	–	–	–	–	–	–	–	–	–
Vanderbilt	–	–	–	25	23	20	25	25	24	25	25	–	–	–	–	–	–	–	–
Virginia	–	–	22	–	–	–	–	–	–	–	–	–	–	–	–	–	–	–	–
Georgetown	14	14	21	20	19	17	17	15	15	18	19	20	17	14	15	15	12	T17	T17
Nebraska	–	–	–	–	–	25	24	23	19	15	20	19	16	13	16	23	24	T17	T17

== USA Today Coaches poll ==
Team	PS	15-Nov	22-Nov	29-Nov	6-Dec	13-Dec	20-Dec	27-Dec	3-Jan	10-Jan	17-Jan	24-Jan	31-Jan	7-Feb	14-Feb	21-Feb	28-Feb	6-Mar	12-Mar	4-Apr
Baylor	1	1	1	1	1	1	1	1	1	1	1	1	1	1	1	1	1	1	1	1
Notre Dame	2	2	3	3	3	3	3	3	3	2	2	2	2	2	4	3	3	3	4	2
Stanford	5	5	5	5	4	4	4	4	4	4	4	4	4	4	3	2	2	2	2	3
UConn	4	4	2	2	2	2	2	2	2	3	3	3	3	3	2	4	4	4	3	4
Maryland	10	9	8	7	6	5	5	5	5	5	7	7	10	8	7	6	5	5	5	5
Duke	8	8	6	6	5	9	9	8	6	6	5	5	6	5	5	7	6	6	6	6
Tennessee	3	3	7	8	8	6	6	7	7	7	9	T9	8	11	10	9	10	7	7	7
Kentucky	15	13	11	10	10	7	8	6	9	8	6	6	5	7	8	10	9	11	11	8
Penn St.	14	12	16	15	18	17	16	17	19	25	21	19	21	21	17	15	12	12	12	9
Georgia Tech	–	–	25	–	–	–	–	–	–	–	–	24	22	23	22	19	18	13	13	10
Miami (FL)	7	7	9	9	9	8	7	10	13	11	10	8	7	6	6	5	7	9	9	11
Texas A&M	6	6	4	4	7	10	10	9	8	10	13	13	16	14	13	11	13	14	14	12
Green Bay	24	23	18	17	16	15	14	14	14	12	11	T9	9	9	12	12	11	10	10	13
Delaware	–	–	–	–	25	23	20	20	20	18	16	16	13	12	9	8	8	8	8	14
St. John’s (NY)	–	–	–	–	–	–	–	–	–	–	–	–	–	–	–	25	21	21	21	15
Louisville	9	10	12	11	13	13	12	13	12	15	15	14	12	17	16	17	17	19	19	16
Georgetown	11	16	21	20	20	19	17	16	16	17	17	18	15	13	14	13	14	T15	16	17
Purdue	21	20	17	16	14	22	21	T21	22	20	18	17	17	19	19	–	25	T15	15	18
Gonzaga	–	–	–	24	–	25	24	24	24	22	25	20	19	18	23	21	20	24	24	19
Georgia	12	11	10	14	12	12	15	15	15	16	14	15	20	20	15	16	15	18	17	20
South Carolina	–	–	–	–	–	–	–	–	–	–	–	–	–	24	–	–	–	–	–	21
Ohio St.	–	25	19	T18	15	14	13	12	11	13	12	T9	11	10	11	14	16	17	18	22
St. Bonaventure	–	–	–	–	–	–	–	–	–	–	–	–	–	–	25	22	22	25	25	23
DePaul	18	18	20	21	21	21	19	19	18	19	19	22	23	22	20	18	23	23	23	24
Kansas	–	–	–	–	–	–	–	–	–	–	–	–	25	–	–	–	–	–	–	25
Florida St.	13	19	24	–	–	–	–	–	–	–	–	–	–	–	–	–	–	–	–	–
Kansas St.	–	–	–	–	–	–	–	–	–	–	T22	–	–	–	–	–	–	–	–	–
LSU	22	21	23	–	–	–	–	–	–	–	–	–	–	–	–	–	–	–	–	–
Michigan St.	25	–	–	–	–	–	–	–	–	–	–	–	–	–	–	–	–	–	–	–
Nebraska	–	–	–	–	–	–	–	–	–	23	24	21	18	15	21	23	24	22	22	–
North Carolina	19	17	15	13	17	16	22	23	23	21	–	25	24	–	–	–	–	–	–	–
Oklahoma	16	14	14	T18	23	–	–	–	–	–	–	–	–	–	–	–	–	–	–	–
Rutgers	17	15	13	12	11	11	11	11	10	9	8	12	14	16	18	20	19	20	20	–
Southern California	23	22	–	–	–	–	–	–	–	–	–	–	–	–	–	–	–	–	–	–
Texas	20	24	22	T22	24	24	25	25	25	–	–	–	–	–	–	–	–	–	–	–
Texas Tech	–	–	–	25	22	20	18	18	17	14	20	23	–	–	–	–	–	–	–	–
Vanderbilt	–	–	–	T22	19	18	23	T21	21	24	T22	–	–	25	24	24	–	–	–	–
