= 2012–13 Florida Gators women's basketball team =

Intercollegiate basketball season

2012–13 Florida Gators women's basketball

Women's National Invitation Tournament, Semifinals
- Conference: Southeastern Conference
- Record: 22–15 (6–10 SEC)
- Head coach: Amanda Butler (6th season)
- Assistant coach: David Lowery; Murriel Page; Angela Crosby
- Home arena: Stephen C. O'Connell Center

2012–13 SEC women's basketball standings
	Conf.				Overall
Team	W		L	PCT	W		L	PCT
No. 10 Tennessee	14	–	2	.875	27	–	8	.771
No. 7 Kentucky	13	–	3	.813	30	–	6	.833
No. 14 Georgia	12	–	4	.750	28	–	7	.800
No. 17 South Carolina	11	–	5	.688	25	–	8	.758
No. 9 Texas A&M †	11	–	5	.688	25	–	10	.714
LSU	10	–	6	.625	22	–	12	.647
Vanderbilt	9	–	7	.563	21	–	12	.636
Arkansas	6	–	10	.375	20	–	13	.606
Florida	6	–	10	.375	22	–	15	.595
Missouri	6	–	10	.375	17	–	15	.531
Auburn	5	–	11	.313	19	–	15	.559
Mississippi State	5	–	11	.313	13	–	17	.433
Alabama	2	–	14	.125	13	–	18	.419
Ole Miss	2	–	14	.125	9	–	20	.310
† 2013 SEC tournament winner Rankings from AP poll

The 2012–13 Florida Gators women's basketball team represented the University of Florida in the sport of basketball during the 2012–13 women's college basketball season. The Gators competed in Division I of the National Collegiate Athletic Association (NCAA) and the Southeastern Conference (SEC). They were led by head coach Amanda Butler, and played their home games in the O'Connell Center on the university's Gainesville, Florida campus.

The Gators advanced to the Women's National Invitation Tournament, where they lost to the Drexel Dragons in the semifinal round.

== Previous season ==
In the 2011–12 season, the Gators finished with a record of 20–13 overall, 8–8 in the SEC, and lost in the 2nd Round of the NCAA tournament to Baylor.

== Schedule and results ==
Date time, TV	Rank^{#}	Opponent^{#}	Result	Record	Site (attendance) city, state
Regular season (Non-conference play)
Nov. 9, 2012*; 4:00 p.m.		Fairfield	W 71–49	1–0	O'Connell Center (729); Gainesville, Florida
Nov. 11, 2012*; 1:00 p.m.		Georgia State	W 84–65	2–0	O'Connell Center (795); Gainesville, Florida
Nov. 15, 2012*; 7:00 p.m.		at Florida State	L 67–98	2–1	Tucker Center (2,443); Tallahassee, Florida
Nov. 19, 2012*; 7:00 p.m.		UNF	W 71–44	3–1	O'Connell Center (1,059); Gainesville, Florida
Nov. 23, 2012*; 5:30 p.m.		vs. NC State; South Point Thanksgiving Shootout	W 66–64	4–1	South Point Arena (297); Enterprise, Nevada
Nov. 24, 2012*; 3:00 p.m.		vs. Northern Iowa; South Point Thanksgiving Shootout	W 80–63	5–1	South Point Arena (307); Enterprise, Nevada
Nov. 25, 2012*; 3:00 p.m.		vs. Arizona State; South Point Thanksgiving Shootout	L 58–74	5–2	South Point Arena (203); Enterprise, Nevada
Dec. 1, 2012*; 2:00 p.m.		at Michigan	L 53–59	5–3	Crisler Center (2,783); Ann Arbor, Michigan
Dec. 4, 2012*; 7:00 p.m.		Troy	W 87–62	6–3	O'Connell Center (491); Gainesville, Florida
Dec. 7, 2012*; 7:00 p.m.		Pacific	W 89–82	7–3	O'Connell Center (679); Gainesville, Florida
Dec. 16, 2012*; 1:00 p.m.		at La Salle	W 74–50	8–3	Tom Gola Arena (217); Philadelphia
Dec. 20, 2012*; 7:00 p.m.		Savannah State; Gator Holiday Classic	W 88–38	9–3	O'Connell Center (650); Gainesville, Florida
Dec. 21, 2012*; 7:00 p.m.		Central Michigan; Gator Holiday Classic	W 81–75	10–3	O'Connell Center (704); Gainesville, Florida
Dec. 28, 2012*; 7:00 p.m.		Holy Cross	W 81–50	11–3	O'Connell Center (1,259); Gainesville, Florida
Regular season (Conference play)
Jan. 3, 2013; 7:00 p.m., SportSouth/Fox Sports/Sun Sports		at No. 6 Kentucky	L 69–76	11–4 (0–1)	Memorial Coliseum (4,862); Lexington, Kentucky
Jan. 6, 2013; 2:00 p.m., SEC Network		LSU	W 77–72	12–4 (1–1)	O'Connell Center (1,575); Gainesville, Florida
Jan. 10, 2013; 8:00 p.m., Sun Sports		at Mississippi State	W 61–55	13–4 (2–1)	Humphrey Coliseum (1,306); Starkville, Mississippi
Jan. 13, 2013; 11:30 a.m., ESPNU		No. 9 Tennessee	L 75–78 ^{OT}	13–5 (2–2)	O'Connell Center (2,609); Gainesville, Florida
Jan. 20, 2013; 1:00 p.m., Fox Sports		No. 19 South Carolina	L 44–52	13–6 (2–3)	O'Connell Center (1,503); Gainesville, Florida
Jan. 24, 2013; 7:00 p.m., Cox Sports/CSS		Ole Miss	L 81–88	13–7 (2–4)	O'Connell Center (901); Gainesville, Florida
Jan. 27, 2013; 1:00 p.m., Cox Sports/CSS		at No. 14 Georgia	L 52–69	13–8 (2–5)	Stegeman Coliseum (4,022); Athens, Georgia
Jan. 31, 2013; 8:00 p.m.		at Missouri	L 64–69	13–9 (2–6)	Mizzou Arena (1,237); Columbia, Missouri
Feb. 3, 2013; 1:00 p.m., Fox Sports		Alabama	W 87–54	14–9 (3–6)	O'Connell Center (1,619); Gainesville, Florida
Feb. 10, 2013; 3:00 p.m., Sportsouth/Fox Sports/Sun Sports		at Auburn	W 65–57	15–9 (4–6)	Auburn Arena (2,477); Auburn, AL
Feb. 14, 2013; 9:00 p.m., Cox Sports/CSS		at No. 11 Texas A&M	L 71–78	15–10 (4–7)	Reed Arena (5,184); College Station, Texas
Feb. 17, 2013; 1:00 p.m., Cox Sports/CSS		No. 13 Georgia	L 57–62	15–11 (4–8)	O'Connell Center (2,232); Gainesville, Florida
Feb. 21, 2013; 7:00 p.m.		Vanderbilt	L 57–68	15–12 (4–9)	O'Connell Center (1,071); Gainesville, Florida
Feb. 24, 2013; 3:00 p.m.		at Alabama	W 67–61	16–12 (5–9)	Foster Auditorium (1,405); Tuscaloosa, AL
Feb. 28, 2013; 7:00 p.m., Sun Sports/Fox Sports		Arkansas	W 69–58	17–12 (6–9)	O'Connell Center (1,159); Gainesville, Florida
Mar. 3, 2013; 1:00 p.m., Sportsouth/Fox Sports/Sun Sports		at No. 14 South Carolina	L 56–67	17–13 (6–10)	Colonial Life Arena (3,343); Columbia, South Carolina
SEC tournament
Mar. 7, 2013; 12:00 p.m., Sportsouth/Fox Sports/Sun Sports	(9)	vs. (8) Arkansas; Second round	W 64–59	18–13	Arena at Gwinnett Center (2,744); Duluth, Georgia
Mar. 8, 2013; 12:00 p.m., Sportsouth/Fox Sports/Sun Sports	(9)	vs. (1) No. 8 Tennessee; Quarterfinal	L 73–82	18–14	Arena at Gwinnett Center (4,819); Duluth, Georgia
National Invitational Tournament
Mar. 21, 2013*; 7:00 p.m.		at FIU; First Round	W 75–68	19–14	U.S. Century Bank Arena (283); Miami
Mar. 25, 2013*; 7:00 p.m.		at Winthrop; Second Round	W 85–53	20–14	Winthrop Coliseum (1,254); Rock Hill, South Carolina
Mar. 27, 2013*; 7:00 p.m.		at Charlotte; Third Round	W 67–65	21–14	Halton Arena (885); Charlotte, North Carolina
Mar. 30, 2013*; 4:00 p.m.		at James Madison; Fourth Round	W 85–80	22–14	JMU Convocation Center (2,182); Harrisonburg, Virginia
Apr. 3, 2013*; 7:00 p.m.		at Drexel; Semifinals	L 57–67	22–15	Daskalakis Athletic Center (1,412); Philadelphia, Pennsylvania
*Non-Conference Game. Rankings from AP poll. All times are in Eastern Time. ( ) Tournament seedings in parentheses.
