= 2012 Big 12 Conference women's basketball tournament =

- Classification: Division I
- Teams: 10
- Site: Municipal Auditorium; Kansas City, Missouri
- Champions: Baylor (4th title)
- Winning coach: Kim Mulkey (4th title)
- MVP: Brittney Griner (Baylor)
- Attendance: 22,833 (overall); 4,235 (championship)
- Television: Metro Sports, FSN

2011–12 Big 12 Conference women's basketball standings
	Conf.				Overall
Team	W		L	PCT	W		L	PCT
No. 1 Baylor †	18	–	0	1.000	40	–	0	1.000
Oklahoma	11	–	7	.611	21	–	13	.618
No. 22 Texas A&M	11	–	7	.611	24	–	11	.686
Iowa State	9	–	9	.500	18	–	13	.581
Kansas State	9	–	9	.500	20	–	14	.588
Kansas	8	–	10	.444	21	–	13	.618
Oklahoma State	8	–	10	.444	22	–	12	.647
Texas	8	–	10	.444	18	–	14	.563
Texas Tech	6	–	12	.333	21	–	14	.600
Missouri	2	–	16	.111	13	–	18	.419
† 2012 Big 12 Tournament winner Rankings from AP poll

The 2012 Big 12 Conference women's basketball championship, known for sponsorship reasons as the 2012 Phillips 66 Big 12 Women's Basketball Championship, was the 2012 edition of the Big 12 Conference's championship tournament. The tournament was held at the Municipal Auditorium in Kansas City from 7 March until 10 March 2012. The Quarterfinals, Semifinals, and Finals were televised on Fox Sports Net. The championship game was held on March 10, 2012.

== Seeding ==
2012 Big 12 Conference women's basketball tournament seeds
Seed	School	Conf.	Over.	Tiebreaker
1	Baylor ‡#	18–0	40–0	
2	Oklahoma #	11–7	21–13	
3	Texas A&M #	11–7	24–11	
4	Iowa State #	9–9	18–13	
5	Kansas State #	9–9	20–14	
6	Kansas #	8–10	21–13	
7	Oklahoma State	8–10	22–12	
8	Texas	8–10	18–14	
9	Texas Tech	6–12	21–14	
10	Missouri	2–16	13–18	
‡ – Big 12 Conference regular season champions, and tournament No. 1 seed. # – Received a single-bye in the conference tournament. Overall records include all games played in the Big 12 Conference tournament.

== Schedule ==
Session	Game	Time	Matchup	Television	Attendance
First Round – Wednesday, March 7
1	1	5:00 pm	#9 Texas Tech 81 vs #8 Texas 58	Metro Sports	3,699
1	2	7:30 pm	#10 Missouri 72 vs #7 Oklahoma State 68	Metro Sports	3,699
Quarterfinals – Thursday, March 8
2	3	11:00 am	#5 Kansas State 67 vs #4 Iowa State 63	FSN	5,542
2	4	1:30 pm	#1 Baylor 72 vs #9 Texas Tech 48	FSN	5,542
3	5	5:00 pm	#2 Oklahoma 70 vs #10 Missouri 59	FSN	3,949
3	6	7:30 pm	#3 Texas A&M 78 vs #6 Kansas 63	FSN	3,949
Semifinals – Friday, March 9
4	7	12:00 pm	#1 Baylor 86 vs #5 Kansas State 65	FSN	5,408
4	8	2:30 pm	#3 Texas A&M 79 vs #2 Oklahoma 66	FSN	5,408
Final – Saturday, March 10
5	9	11:00 am	#1 Baylor 73 vs #3 Texas A&M 50	FSN	4,235
Game times in CT. #-Rankings denote tournament seed

== Bracket ==
First round March 7, 2012
8	Texas	58
9	Texas Tech	81
7	Oklahoma St	68
10	Missouri	72

Quarterfinals; March 8, 2012
1	Baylor	72
9	Texas Tech	48
4	Iowa State	63
5	Kansas State	67
3	Texas A&M	78
6	Kansas	63
2	Oklahoma	70
10	Missouri	59

Semifinals; March 9, 2012
1	Baylor	86
5	Kansas State	65
3	Texas A&M	79
2	Oklahoma	66

Championship Game; March 10, 2012
1	Baylor	73
3	Texas A&M	50

All Times Central
* – Denotes overtime

== All-Tournament Team ==
Most Outstanding Player – Brittney Griner, Baylor

Player	Team
Brittney Griner	Baylor
Odyssey Sims	Baylor
Destiny Williams	Baylor
Kelsey Bone	Texas A&M
Whitney Hand	Oklahoma

== See also ==
- 2012 Big 12 Conference men's basketball tournament
- 2012 NCAA Women's Division I Basketball Tournament
- 2011–12 NCAA Division I women's basketball rankings
