= Matthew Mitchell (basketball) =

American college basketball coach

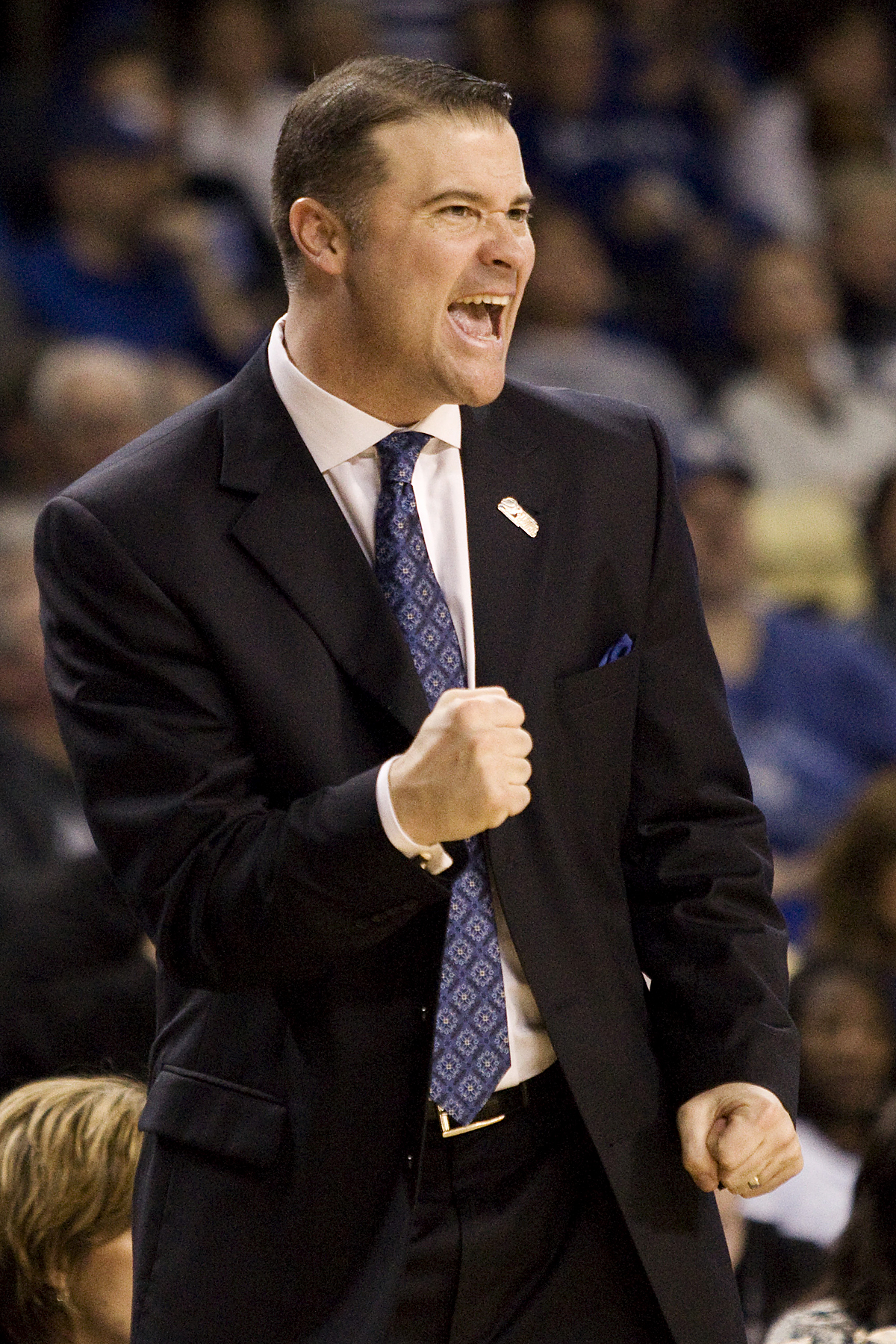

Current position
- Title: Head coach
- Team: Houston
- Conference: Big 12
- Record: 7–23 (.233)

Biographical details
- Born: December 16, 1970 (age 55); Louisville, Mississippi, U.S.
- Education: Mississippi State

Coaching career (HC unless noted)
- 1995–1996: Winston Acad. (MS) (asst.)
- 1996–1998: Central Holmes Acad. (MS)
- 1998–1999: Manchester Acad. (MS)
- 1999–2000: Tennessee (grad. asst.)
- 2000–2003: Florida (asst.)
- 2003–2005: Kentucky (asst.)
- 2005–2007: Morehead State
- 2007–2020: Kentucky
- 2025–present: Houston

Head coaching record
- Overall: 318–177 (.642)
- Tournaments: 17–9 (.654) (NCAA Division I); 3–2 (.600) (WNIT)

Accomplishments and honors

Awards
- 2× SEC Coach of the Year (2010, 2012)

Matthew LaMont Mitchell (born December 16, 1970) is an American college basketball coach, who is currently the head coach of the University of Houston women's basketball team. He was previously head coach for University of Kentucky women's basketball until November 12, 2020, when Mitchell announced his initial retirement from coaching.

== Coaching ==
Mitchell became the head coach of UK on April 23, 2007, succeeding former UK coach Mickie DeMoss. Prior to becoming the coach at Kentucky, Mitchell spent two years as the head coach at Morehead State. Mitchell started his coaching career as graduate assistant under Pat Summitt at Tennessee, and he also spent time as an assistant coach at Florida and Kentucky before becoming a head coach.

Following the 2009–10 season, Mitchell was named the SEC Coach of the Year. In addition to Mitchell's recognition, Victoria Dunlap was named the SEC Player of the Year and A'dia Mathies was named the SEC Freshman of the Year. The Wildcats joined the unbeaten national champion 1998 Tennessee squad as the only teams in SEC women's basketball history to sweep the major post-season awards.

Mitchell's success on the court has already moved him up to No. 4 in all-time wins at Kentucky with 86. His winning percentage of 63.7 percent (86–49) ranks third.

His third year as head coach proved to be the best yet as Mitchell was named SEC Coach of the Year for his turning the team around that went from going 16–16 overall, 5–9 in conference play the year prior to a 28–8 overall record in 2009–10. The Cats' 28 overall wins, that included 11 SEC wins, were school records and with UK finishing second in the league despite being picked to finish 11th in the preseason polls.

In his fourth season Mitchell once again led the Wildcats to an outstanding season with a 25–9 overall record and a school-record-tying 11 wins (11–5) in the SEC. UK took a second-place finish in the league standings for the second-consecutive year and advanced to the second round of the NCAA Tournament as the No. 4 seed.

Mitchell led Kentucky to one of the most successful seasons in school history in 2011–12 with a 28–7 overall record, including an 18–0 mark at home, and an appearance in the Elite Eight for the second time in three years. The Wildcats won their first SEC regular season championship since 1982 with a school-record 13–3 mark in league play. The Cats finished No. 12 in the final AP poll & No. 8 in final USA Today/ESPN coaches' poll, marking the highest final AP ranking since finishing 11th in 1983 and the highest final ranking in the coaches' poll in school history. He was named SEC Coach of the Year for the second time in three seasons by the AP.

In January 2018, Mitchell earned his 300th career victory, with his 270th coming in his twelfth year as Kentucky's head coach.

== Head coaching record ==
Record table
Season	Team	Overall	Conference	Standing	Postseason
Morehead State Eagles (Ohio Valley Conference) (2005–2007)
2005–06	Morehead State	16–13	11–9	4th	
2006–07	Morehead State	14–16	13–7	4th	
Morehead State:		30–29 (.508)	24–16 (.600)		
Kentucky Wildcats (Southeastern Conference) (2007–2020)
2007–08	Kentucky	17–16	8–6	5th	WNIT Quarterfinals
2008–09	Kentucky	16–16	5–9	10th	WNIT second round
2009–10	Kentucky	28–8	11–5	2nd	NCAA Elite Eight
2010–11	Kentucky	25–9	11–5	2nd	NCAA second round
2011–12	Kentucky	28–7	13–3	1st	NCAA Elite Eight
2012–13	Kentucky	30–6	13–3	2nd	NCAA Elite Eight
2013–14	Kentucky	26–9	10–6	4th	NCAA Sweet Sixteen
2014–15	Kentucky	24–10	10–6	T-4th	NCAA second round
2015–16	Kentucky	25–8	10–6	T-4th	NCAA Sweet Sixteen
2016–17	Kentucky	22–11	11–5	T-4th	NCAA second round
2017–18	Kentucky	15–17	6–10	9th	
2018–19	Kentucky	25–8	11–5	4th	NCAA second round
2019–20	Kentucky	21–7	10–6	T–3rd	Postseason cancelled due to the COVID-19 pandemic.
Kentucky:		281–125 (.692)	119–69 (.633)		
Houston Cougars (Big 12 Conference) (2025–present)
2025–26	Houston	7–23	1–17	16th	
Houston:		7–23 (.233)	1–17 (.056)		
Total:		318–177 (.642)			
National champion Postseason invitational champion Conference regular season champion Conference regular season and conference tournament champion Division regular season champion Division regular season and conference tournament champion Conference tournament champion

== Personal ==
Mitchell attended Mississippi State University from 1993 to 1995, where he received a Bachelor of Science degree in marketing.

He is married to the former Jenna Ramsey, from Amelia Island, and he has three daughters, Lacy, Saylor and Presley Blue.

Matthew and his wife Jenna are very active in community service. In June 2014, Matthew and Jenna pledged $1 million over the next 10 years to the University of Kentucky Athletics Department. Just a few months later, they launched The Mitchell Family Foundation, a non-profit organization set to benefit charities in the Lexington community. The first fund-raising event of the Foundation in September 2014 brought in John C. Maxwell. In October 2016, Matthew and Jenna were presented the 2016 Community Service Award by the National Urban League of Lexington.

== Retirement and Injury ==
On November 12, 2020, Mitchell announced his retirement following months of recovery after suffering a concussion from an accident. The accident happened in March 2020 during a family vacation in Mexico. Associate head coach Kyra Elzy, who had been leading the program on an interim basis, was eventually named Mitchell's successor.

== See also ==
- Joe Craft Center
- Kentucky Wildcats women's basketball
