= Ashley Field =

American basketball player (born 1989)

Personal information
- Born: August 10, 1989 (age 36) Burnet, Texas, U.S.
- Listed height: 6 ft 2 in (1.88 m)
- Listed weight: 160 lb (73 kg)

Career information
- College: Baylor (2009–2012)
- Position: Center
- Number: 24

Career highlights
- NCAA champion (2012)

Ashley Ann Field (born August 10, 1989) is a former American women's college basketball player in the Baylor University. She graduated in December 2011.

Field was born in Burnet, Texas. She graduated from Faith Academy. In the 2011–12 Baylor Lady Bears season, she won the NCAA championships.

== Baylor statistics ==
Legend
GP	Games played	GS	Games started	MPG	Minutes per game
FG%	Field goal percentage	3P%	3-point field goal percentage	FT%	Free throw percentage
RPG	Rebounds per game	APG	Assists per game	SPG	Steals per game
BPG	Blocks per game	PPG	Points per game	**Bold**	Career high

Year	Team	GP	Points	FG%	3P%	FT%	RPG	APG	SPG	BPG	PPG
2005–06	Baylor	31	309	34.1%	32.2%	79.4%	**3.6**	3.4	1.6	0.1	10.0
2006–07	Baylor	**35**	263	**37.6%**	32.1%	76.1%	3.2	2.3	1.2	0.1	7.5
2007–08	Baylor	34	357	35.8%	33.6%	71.4%	3.1	3.1	1.4	**0.3**	10.5
2008–09	Baylor	**35**	**410**	36.6%	**35.3%**	**80.4%**	3.3	**3.5**	**1.8**	0.1	**11.7**
Career		135	1339	36.0%	33.5%	77.1%	3.3	3.1	1.5	0.2	9.9
