= 2011–12 Stanford Cardinal women's basketball team =

Intercollegiate basketball season

2011–12 Stanford Cardinal women's basketball

NCAA tournament, Final Four
- Conference: Pac-12 Conference
- Record: 35-2 (18-0 Pac-12)
- Head coach: Tara VanDerveer (27th season)
- Assistant coaches: Amy Tucker Associate head coach; Kate Paye; Trina Patterson
- Home arena: Maples Pavilion

The 2011–12 Stanford Cardinal women's basketball team represented Stanford University in the 2011–12 NCAA Division I women's basketball season. The Cardinal, coached by Tara VanDerveer, and a member of the Pacific-10 Conference, won the conference's regular-season and tournament titles and advanced to the Final Four of the 2011 NCAA Division I women's basketball tournament.

== Schedule ==
Date time, TV	Rank^{#}	Opponent^{#}	Result	Record	Site city, state
Non-conference regular season Schedule
November 4; 5:00 pm, no		Texas	W 72-59	1-0	Frank Erwin Center; Austin, Texas
November 13; 2:00 pm, no		Gonzaga	W 76-61	2-0	Maples Pavilion; Stanford, California
November 17; 7:00 pm, no		Old Dominion	W 97-48	3-0	Maples Pavilion; Stanford, California
November 21; 4:30 pm, no		at Connecticut	L 58-68	3-1	Harry A. Gampel Pavilion; Hartford, Connecticut
November 25; 10:00 am, no		at Xavier	W 80-64	4-1	Cintas Center; Cincinnati, Ohio
November 30; 7:00 pm, no		UC Davis	W 93-44	5-1	Maples Pavilion; Stanford, California
December 4; 2:00 pm, no		at Fresno State	W 93-59	6-1	Save Mart Center; Fresno, California
December 17; 1:00 pm, no		Princeton	W 85-66	7-1	Maples Pavilion; Stanford, California
December 20; 7:00 pm, no		Tennessee; Rivalry	W 97-80	8-1	Maples Pavilion; Stanford, California
December 22; 2:00 pm, no		CSU Bakerfield	W 90-48	9-1	Maples Pavilion; Stanford, California
December 29; 7:00 pm, no		at USC	W 61-53	10-1	Galen Center; Los Angeles, California
December 31; 2:00 pm, no		at UCLA	W 77-50	11-1	Pauley Pavilion; Los Angeles, California
January 5; 7:00 pm, no		Oregon	W 93-70	12-1	Maples Pavilion; Stanford, California
January 7; 2:00 pm, no		Oregon State	W 67-60	13-1	Maples Pavilion; Stanford, California
January 12; 6:00 pm, no		at Utah	W 62-43	13-1	Jon M. Huntsman Center; Salt Lake City, Utah
January 14; 3:00 pm, no		at Colorado	W 80-54	14-1	Coors Events Center; Boulder, Colorado
January 19; 7:00 pm, no		Washington State	W 75-41	16-1	Maples Pavilion; Stanford, California
January 21; 2:00 pm, no		Washington Huskies	W 65-47	17-1	Maples Pavilion; Stanford, California
January 28; 2:00 pm, no		California	W 74-71	18-1	Maples Pavilion; Stanford, California
February 2; 6:00 pm, no		at Arizona State	W 62-49	19-1	Wells Fargo Arena; Tempe, Arizona
February 4; 1:00 pm, no		at Arizona	W 91-51	20-1	McKale Center; Tucson, Arizona
February 9; 6:00 pm, no		USC	W 69-52	21-1	Maples Pavilion; Palo Alto, California
February 12; 12:00 pm, no		UCLA	W 82-59	22-1	Maples Pavilion; Stanford, California
February 16; 7:00 pm, no		at Oregon State	W 78-45	23-1	Gill Coliseum; Corvallis, Oregon
February 18; 1:00 pm, no		at Oregon	W 81-46	24-1	Matthew Knight Arena; Eugene, Oregon
February 23; 7:00 pm, no		Colorado	W 68-46	25-1	Maples Pavilion; Stanford, California
February 25; 2:00 pm, no		Utah	W 69-42	26-1	Maples Pavilion; Stanford, California
February 29; 7:00 pm, no		Seattle University	W 76-52	27-1	Maples Pavilion; Stanford, California
March 4; 6:00 pm, no		at California	W 86-61	28-1	Haas Pavilion; Berkeley, California
March 8; 12:00 pm, no		vs. Washington; Quarterfinals	W 76-57	29-1	Galen Center; Los Angeles, CA
March 9; 12:00 pm, no		vs. Arizona State; Semifinals	W 52-43	30-1	Staples Center; Los Angeles, CA
March 10; 11:30 am, no		vs. California; Championship	W 77-62	31-1	Staples Center; Los Angeles, CA
*Non-conference game. ^{#}Rankings from AP Poll. (#) Tournament seedings in parentheses. All times are in Pacific Time.

== NCAA basketball tournament ==
Date time, TV	Rank^{#}	Opponent^{#}	Result	Record	Site city, state
NCAA tournament
March 17*; 10:30 am, ESPN2		vs. Hampton; First Round	W 73-51	32-1	Ted Constant Convocation Center; Norfolk, VA
March 19*; 7:15 pm, ESPNU		vs. West Virginia; Second Round	W 72-55	33-1	Ted Constant Convocation Center; Norfolk, VA
March 24*; 8:30 pm, ESPN		vs. No. 25 South Carolina; Sweet Sixteen	W 76-60	34-1	Save Mart Center; Fresno, CA
March 26*; 6:00 pm, ESPN		vs. No. 6 Duke; Elite Eight	W 81-69	35-1	Save Mart Center; Fresno, CA
April 1*; 6:00 pm, ESPN		vs. No. 1 Baylor; Final Four	L 47-59	35-2	Pepsi Center; Denver, CO
*Non-conference game. ^{#}Rankings from AP Poll. (#) Tournament seedings in parentheses. All times are in Pacific Time.
