= 2011–12 Kentucky Wildcats women's basketball team =

Intercollegiate basketball season

2011–12 Kentucky Wildcats women's basketball

2012 SEC regular season champions

NCAA tournament, Elite Eight
- Conference: Southeastern Conference

Ranking
- Coaches: No. 8
- AP: No. 12
- Record: 27–6 (13–3 SEC)
- Head coach: Matthew Mitchell (Fourth season)
- Assistant coaches: Kyra Elzy (fourth season); Matt Insell (fourth season); Shalon Pillow (third season)
- Home arena: Memorial Coliseum (Capacity: 8,500)

2011–12 SEC women's basketball standings
	Conf.				Overall
Team	W		L	PCT	W		L	PCT
No. 12 Kentucky	13	–	3	.813	28	–	7	.800
No. 9 Tennessee^{†}	12	–	4	.750	27	–	9	.750
No. 20 Georgia	11	–	5	.688	22	–	9	.710
LSU	10	–	6	.625	23	–	11	.676
Arkansas	10	–	6	.625	24	–	9	.727
No. 25 South Carolina	10	–	6	.625	25	–	10	.714
Vanderbilt	9	–	7	.563	23	–	10	.697
Florida	8	–	8	.500	20	–	13	.606
Auburn	5	–	11	.313	13	–	17	.433
Mississippi State	4	–	12	.250	14	–	16	.467
Alabama	2	–	14	.125	12	–	19	.387
Ole Miss	2	–	14	.125	12	–	18	.400
† 2012 SEC tournament winner Rankings from AP poll

The 2011–12 Kentucky Wildcats women's basketball team represented the University of Kentucky in the 2011–12 NCAA Division I women's basketball season. The team was a member of the Southeastern Conference and played its home games on campus at Memorial Coliseum—unlike UK's famous men's program, which plays off-campus at Rupp Arena in downtown Lexington. The Wildcats were coached by Matthew Mitchell.

== Roster ==
From the official UK women's basketball site:

#	Name	Height	Position	Class	Hometown	Previous team(s)
Scholarship players
0	Jennifer O'Neill	5'6"	G	So.	Bronx, New York	Saint Michael Academy
1	A'dia Mathies	5'9"	G	Jr.	Louisville, Kentucky	Iroquois
3	Chrystal Riley	5'5"	G	Sr.	Memphis, Tennessee	Hillcrest/LSU
4	Keyla Snowden	5'7"	G	Sr.	Lexington, Kentucky	Lexington Catholic/Akron
10	Bernisha Pinkett	5'7"	G	So.	Washington, District of Columbia	Howard D. Woodson
11	DeNesha Stallworth	6'3"	C	Jr.	Richmond, California	Pinole Valley/California
13	Bria Goss	5'10"	G	Fr.	Indianapolis, Indiana	Ben Davis
20	Maegan Conwright	5'8"	G	So.	Arlington, Texas	Timberview
23	Samarie Walker	6'1"	F	So.	West Carrollton, Ohio	Chaminade-Julienne/Connecticut
24	Amber Smith	5'6"	G	Sr.	Winter Haven, Florida	Winter Haven
31	Samantha Drake	6'3"	C	So.	Bardstown, Kentucky	Nelson County
32	Kastine Evans	5'8"	G	So.	Salem, Connecticut	Norwich Free Academy
40	Brittany Henderson	6'2"	F	Jr.	Pasadena, California	John Muir
50	Azia Bishop	6'3"	F	Fr.	Toledo, Ohio	Start

== 2011–12 schedule ==
Date time, TV	Rank^{#}	Opponent^{#}	Result	Record	Site city, state
Exhibition
November 6*; 2:00 pm	No. 12	Coker College	W 86–44		Memorial Coliseum; Lexington, Kentucky
Non-conference regular season
November 11*; 7:00 pm	No. 10	at Morehead State	W 96–60	1–0	Johnson Arena; Morehead, Kentucky
November 15*; 11:00 am	No. 17	Jacksonville State	W 100–25	2–0	Memorial Coliseum; Lexington, Kentucky
November 17*; 7:00 pm	No. 17	Northeastern	W 81–47	3–0	Memorial Coliseum; Lexington, Kentucky
November 19*; 3:00 pm	No. 17	Southern Miss	W 88–71	4–0	Memorial Coliseum; Lexington, Kentucky
November 23*; 5:30 pm	No. 14	Nebraska-Omaha	W 81–48	5–0	Memorial Coliseum; Lexington, Kentucky
November 25*; 7:00 pm	No. 14	Sam Houston State	W 73–52	6–0	Memorial Coliseum; Lexington, Kentucky
November 27*; 1:00 pm, BBSN	No. 14	Mississippi Valley State	W 90–51	7–0	Memorial Coliseum; Lexington, Kentucky
December 4*; 1:00 pm, BBSN	No. 12	No. 10 Louisville	W 74–54	8–0	Memorial Coliseum; Lexington, Kentucky
December 8*; 2:00 pm, BBSN	No. 10	No. 6 Duke	W 72–65	9–0	Rupp Arena; Lexington, Kentucky
December 11*; 1:00 pm, BBSN	No. 10	Arkansas-Pine Bluff	W 101–43	10–0	Memorial Coliseum; Lexington, Kentucky
December 18*; 1:00 pm, ESPNU	No. 8	at No. 3 Notre Dame	L 83–92	10–1	Edmund P. Joyce Center; South Bend, Indiana
December 21*; 7:00 pm	No. 8	at Samford	W 90–61	11–1	Memorial Coliseum; Lexington, Kentucky
December 28*; 8:00 pm	No. 6	at Middle Tennessee	L 58–70	11–2	Murphy Center; Murfreesboro, Tennessee
SEC regular season
January 1; 1:00 pm, CSS	No. 11	at Florida	W 59–56	12–2 (1–0)	O'Connell Center; Gainesville, Florida
January 5; 6:00 pm, BBSN	No. 11	Arkansas	W 84–72	13–2 (2–0)	Memorial Coliseum; Lexington, Kentucky
January 8; 3:30 pm, FSN	No. 11	Mississippi State	W 88–40	14–2 (3–0)	Memorial Coliseum; Lexington, Kentucky
January 12; 7:00 pm, FSN	No. 9	No. 6 Tennessee; Rivalry	W 61–60	15–2 (4–0)	Memorial Coliseum; Lexington, Kentucky
January 15; 3:00 pm	No. 9	at South Carolina	W 66–58	16–2 (5–0)	Colonial Life Arena; Columbia, South Carolina
January 19; 7:00 pm	No. 6	at No. 15 Georgia	W 69–64	17–2 (6–0)	Stegeman Coliseum; Athens, Georgia
January 22; 2:00 pm, SEC Network	No. 6	Florida	W 57–52	18–2 (7–0)	Memorial Coliseum; Lexington, Kentucky
January 26; 7:00 pm	No. 6	at Auburn	W 66–48	19–2 (8–0)	Auburn Arena; Auburn, Alabama
January 29; 2:00 pm, CSS	No. 6	Alabama	W 82–68	20–2 (9–0)	Memorial Coliseum; Lexington, Kentucky
February 2; 7:00 pm	No. 6	Ole Miss	W 82–41	21–2 (10–0)	Memorial Coliseum; Lexington, Kentucky
February 15; 3:00 pm, Cox Sports	No. 6	at LSU	L 51–61	21–3 (10–1)	Pete Maravich Assembly Center; Baton Rouge, Louisiana
February 13; 7:00 pm, ESPN2	No. 7	at No. 11 Tennessee; Rivalry	L 54–91	21–4 (10–2)	Thompson-Boling Arena; Knoxville, Tennessee
February 17; 7:00 pm	No. 7	at Alabama	L 75–77	21–5 (10–3)	Coleman Coliseum; Tuscaloosa, Alabama
February 20; 9:00 pm, ESPN2	No. 13	Vanderbilt	W 70–61	22–5 (11–3)	Memorial Coliseum; Lexington, Kentucky
February 23; 9:00 pm	No. 13	South Carolina	W 53–50	23–5 (12–3)	Memorial Coliseum; Lexington, Kentucky
February 26; 1:30 pm	No. 13	at Mississippi State	W 76–40	24–5 (13–3)	Humphrey Coliseum; Starkville, Mississippi
SEC tournament
March 2; 1:00 pm	No. 10	vs. Florida; Quarterfinals	W 71–67	25–5 (13–3)	Bridgestone Arena; Nashville, Tennessee
March 3; 6:30 pm, FSN	No. 10	vs. LSU; Semifinals	L 61–72	25–6 (13–3)	Bridgestone Arena; Nashville, Tennessee
NCAA tournament
March 17; 4:20 pm, ESPN2	No. (2)	vs. No. (15) McNeese; First round	W 68–62	26–6 (13–3)	Hilton Coliseum; Ames, Iowa
March 19; 9:45 pm, ESPN2	No. (2)	vs. No. (7) Green Bay; Second round	W 65–62	27–6 (13–3)	Hilton Coliseum; Ames, Iowa
March 25; 7:00 pm, ESPN2	No. (2)	vs. No. (11) Gonzaga; Sweet Sixteen	W 79–62	28–6 (13–3)	Ryan Center; Kingston, Rhode Island
March 27; 7:00 pm, ESPN	No. (2)	vs. No. (1) Connecticut; Elite Eight	L 65–80	28–7 (13–3)	Ryan Center; Kingston, Rhode Island
*Non-conference game. ^{#}Rankings from AP Poll. (#) Tournament seedings in parentheses. All times are in Eastern time.
