= 2011–12 Iowa State Cyclones women's basketball team =

Intercollegiate basketball season

2011–12 Iowa State Cyclones women's basketball
- Conference: Big 12
- Record: 18-13 (9-9 Big 12)
- Head coach: Bill Fennelly
- Assistant coaches: Jack Easley; Latoja Schaben; Jodi Steyer
- Home arena: Hilton Coliseum (Capacity: 14,092)

2011–12 Big 12 Conference women's basketball standings
| | Conf. | | | | Overall |
| Team | W | | L | PCT | W | | L | PCT |
|---|---|---|---|---|---|---|---|---|
| No. 1 Baylor † | 18 | – | 0 | 1.000 | 40 | – | 0 | 1.000 |
| Oklahoma | 11 | – | 7 | .611 | 21 | – | 13 | .618 |
| No. 22 Texas A&M | 11 | – | 7 | .611 | 24 | – | 11 | .686 |
| Iowa State | 9 | – | 9 | .500 | 18 | – | 13 | .581 |
| Kansas State | 9 | – | 9 | .500 | 20 | – | 14 | .588 |
| Kansas | 8 | – | 10 | .444 | 21 | – | 13 | .618 |
| Oklahoma State | 8 | – | 10 | .444 | 22 | – | 12 | .647 |
| Texas | 8 | – | 10 | .444 | 18 | – | 14 | .563 |
| Texas Tech | 6 | – | 12 | .333 | 21 | – | 14 | .600 |
| Missouri | 2 | – | 16 | .111 | 13 | – | 18 | .419 |
† 2012 Big 12 Tournament winner Rankings from AP poll

The 2011–12 Iowa State Cyclones women's basketball team represented Iowa State University in the 2011–12 NCAA Division I Women's Basketball season. The Cyclones were coached by Bill Fennelly and played their home games at Hilton Coliseum in Ames, Iowa. The 2011-12 Cyclones finished tied for 3rd in the Big 12 Conference, and were invited to the 2012 NCAA Women's Division I Basketball Tournament for the sixth consecutive season.

Hilton Magic proved to be an overwhelming advantage for the Cyclones, with home attendance ranked 3rd (10,125 average) in the nation.

== Roster ==
| Number | Name | Height | Position | Class |
|---|---|---|---|---|
| 3 | Harris, Kelsey | 5'10" | Guard | Sophomore |
| 4 | Moody, Nikki | 5'8" | Guard | Freshman |
| 5 | Christofferson, Hallie | 6'3" | Forward | Sophomore |
| 10 | Mansfield, Lauren | 5'7" | Guard | Senior |
| 21 | Mays, Kileah | 6'1" | Center | Freshman |
| 22 | Williamson, Brynn | 5'11" | Guard/forward | Freshman |
| 23 | Cole, Chassidy | 5'8" | Guard | Senior |
| 24 | Arganbright, Elly | 5'6" | Guard | Sophomore |
| 32 | Ellis, Fallon | 5'11" | Guard/forward | Freshman |
| 33 | Poppens, Chelsea | 6'2" | Power forward | Junior |
| 42 | Zimmerman, Amanda | 6'2" | Power forward | Junior |
| 55 | Prins, Adrianna | 6'6" | Post | Junior |

== Schedule ==
| Date time, TV | Rank^{#} | Opponent^{#} | Result | Record | Site (attendance) city, state |
Pre-season (exhibition)
| November 1; 7:00 pm | | Coe College | W 87-33 | | Hilton Coliseum (10,099); Ames, IA |
| November 6; 2:00 pm | | Rockhurst | W 79-29 | | Hilton Coliseum (N/A); Ames, IA |
Regular season
| November 11*; 7:00 pm | | Houston Baptist | W 73-33 | 1-0 | Hilton Coliseum (10,100); Ames, IA |
| November 15*; 5:00 pm | | at Drake | W 71-64 | 2-0 | Knapp Center (2,420); Des Moines, IA |
| November 20*; 5:15 pm | | Northern Arizona | W 65-41 | 3-0 | Hilton Coliseum (7,335); Ames, IA |
| November 25*; 6:00 pm | | vs. Penn State; Nugget Classic | L 59-66 | 3-1 | (1,089); Reno, NV |
| November 26*; 7:00 pm | | vs. Butler; Nugget Classic | W 64-44 | 4-1 | (148); Reno, NV |
| December 4*; 1:00 pm | | at Michigan | L 49-56 | 4-2 | Crisler Center (2,573); Ann Arbor, MI |
| December 7*; 7:00 pm, Mediacom | | Iowa; Cy-Hawk Series | W 62-54 | 5-2 | Hilton Coliseum (12,662); Ames, IA |
| December 11*; 2:00 pm | | Mississippi Valley State | W 77-47 | 6-2 | Hilton Coliseum (10,335); Ames, IA |
| December 20*; 7:00 pm, Mediacom | | Northern Iowa | W 84-57 | 7-2 | Hilton Coliseum (7,822); Ames, IA |
| December 29*; 7:30 pm | | New Hampshire; Cyclone Challenge | W 71-57 | 8-2 | Hilton Coliseum (7,475); Ames, IA |
| December 30*; 7:30 pm | | Buffalo; Cyclone Challenge | W 65-45 | 9-2 | Hilton Coliseum (7,076); Ames, IA |
| January 4; 7:00 pm | | at Oklahoma | L 51-80 | 9-3 (0-1) | (5,703); Norman, OK |
| January 7; 7:00 pm, Mediacom | | No. 1 Baylor | L 45-57 | 9-4 (0-2) | Hilton Coliseum (9,103); Ames, IA |
| January 11; 7:00 pm | | at Kansas | L 67-74 ^{2 OT} | 9-5 (0-3) | (1,459); Lawrence, KS |
| January 14; 7:00 pm | | No. 12 Texas A&M | L 33-59 | 9-6 (0-4) | Hilton Coliseum (11,658); Ames, IA |
| January 18; 8:00 pm, Longhorn Network | | at Texas | L 60-62 | 9-7 (0-5) | (2,998); Austin, TX |
| January 22; 1:30 pm, Fox Sports Net | | No. 17 Texas Tech | W 66-49 | 10-7 (1-5) | Hilton Coliseum (11,911); Ames, IA |
| January 25; 7:00 pm | | at Kansas State | W 66-57 | 11-7 (2-5) | (3,175); Manhattan, KS |
| January 29; 1:00 pm, Fox Sports Net | | at No. 14 Texas A&M | L 64-66 | 11-8 (2-6) | (6,054); College Station, TX |
| February 1; 7:00 pm | | Oklahoma State | W 73-52 | 12-8 (3-6) | Hilton Coliseum (10,470); Ames, IA |
| February 4; 1:00 pm | | Texas | W 71-56 | 13-8 (4-6) | Hilton Coliseum (11,517); Ames, IA |
| February 8; 7:00 pm | | at Missouri | W 65-52 | 14-8 (5-6) | (1,208); Columbia, MO |
| February 12; 1:30 pm, ESPN2/ESPN3 | | at Texas Tech | L 41-51 | 14-9 (5-7) | (7,297); Lubbock, TX |
| February 15; 7:00 pm | | Kansas | W 66-47 | 15-9 (6-7) | Hilton Coliseum (10,556); Ames, IA |
| February 18; 7:00 pm, Mediacom | | Oklahoma | W 77-71 | 16-9 (7-7) | Hilton Coliseum (12,454); Ames, IA |
| February 21; 7:00 pm, Mediacom | | Missouri | W 66-59 ^{OT} | 17-9 (8-7) | Hilton Coliseum (10,539); Ames, IA |
| February 25; 7:00 pm | | at Oklahoma State | L 63-71 | 17-10 (8-8) | (3,068); Stillwater, OK |
| February 29; 7:00 pm, Mediacom | | Kansas State | W 57-33 | 18-10 (9-8) | Hilton Coliseum (10,983); Ames, IA |
| March 3; 11:00 am, Fox Sports Net | | at No. 1 Baylor | L 53-77 | 18-11 (9-9) | (9,435); Waco, TX |
Big 12 Tournament
| March 8*; 11:00 am, Fox Sports Net | | vs. Kansas State; Big 12 Tournament Quarterfinals | L 63-67 | 18-12 (9-9) | Municipal Auditorium (N/A); Kansas City, MO |
NCAA Division 1 Tournament
| March 17*; 5:30 pm, ESPN2/ESPN3.com | No. 10 | No. 7 Green Bay; NCAA tournament First Round | L 57-71 | 18-13 (9-9) | Hilton Coliseum (4,695); Ames, IA |
*Non-conference game. ^{#}Rankings from AP Poll. (#) Tournament seedings in parentheses. All times are in Central Time.
