= 2012–13 Kentucky Wildcats women's basketball team =

Intercollegiate basketball season

2012–13 Kentucky Wildcats women's basketball

NCAA Women's Division I Tournament, Elite Eight
- Conference: Southeastern Conference

Ranking
- Coaches: No. 7
- AP: No. 8
- Record: 30–6 (13–3 SEC)
- Head coach: Matthew Mitchell (6th season)
- Assistant coaches: Matt Insell (Fifth season); Shalon Pillow (Fourth season); Danielle Santos (First season)
- Home arena: Memorial Coliseum (Capacity: 10,000)

2012–13 SEC women's basketball standings
	Conf.				Overall
Team	W		L	PCT	W		L	PCT
No. 10 Tennessee	14	–	2	.875	27	–	8	.771
No. 7 Kentucky	13	–	3	.813	30	–	6	.833
No. 14 Georgia	12	–	4	.750	28	–	7	.800
No. 17 South Carolina	11	–	5	.688	25	–	8	.758
No. 9 Texas A&M †	11	–	5	.688	25	–	10	.714
LSU	10	–	6	.625	22	–	12	.647
Vanderbilt	9	–	7	.563	21	–	12	.636
Arkansas	6	–	10	.375	20	–	13	.606
Florida	6	–	10	.375	22	–	15	.595
Missouri	6	–	10	.375	17	–	15	.531
Auburn	5	–	11	.313	19	–	15	.559
Mississippi State	5	–	11	.313	13	–	17	.433
Alabama	2	–	14	.125	13	–	18	.419
Ole Miss	2	–	14	.125	9	–	20	.310
† 2013 SEC tournament winner Rankings from AP poll

The 2012–13 Kentucky Wildcats women's basketball team represented the University of Kentucky in the 2012–13 NCAA Division I women's basketball season. The Wildcats, coached by Matthew Mitchell, are a member of the Southeastern Conference, and played their home games on campus at Memorial Coliseum—unlike UK's famous men's program, which played off-campus at Rupp Arena in downtown Lexington.

== Pre-season outlook ==
The Wildcats returned four starters, including 2012 SEC Player of the Year A'dia Mathies and SEC Freshman of the Year Bria Goss, from a team that finished 28–7 and won their second regular-season Southeastern Conference title in school history, their first since 1981–82. Jennifer O'Neil also returned after sitting out the 2011–12 season with a knee injury, and Kentucky added DeNesha Stallworth (transfer from California), Jelleah Sidney (transfer from Chipola Junior College), and Janee Thompson (McDonald's All-American from Whitney Young High School). The Wildcats were ranked 6th in the Associated Press Preseason Poll, the highest preseason ranking in school history. The SEC coaches also picked Kentucky as the preseason favorite to win the 2012–13 conference title and named A'dia Mathies preseason player of the year.

== Recruiting ==
College recruiting information
Name	Hometown	School	Height	Weight	Commit date
Janee Thompson; PG	Chicago, Illinois	Whitney Young HS	5 ft 7 in (1.70 m)	N/A	Oct 31, 2011
Janee Thompson; PG	Recruit ratings: (94)				
Overall recruit ranking:
Note: In many cases, Scout, Rivals, 247Sports, On3, and ESPN may conflict in their listings of height and weight.; In these cases, the average was taken. ESPN grades are on a 100-point scale.; Sources:

== 2012–13 roster ==
From the official UK women's basketball site:

#	Name	Height	Position	Class	Hometown	Previous Team(s)
Scholarship Players
0	Jennifer O'Neill	5'6"	G	RS So.	Bronx, New York	Saint Michael Academy
1	A'dia Mathies	5'9"	G	Sr.	Louisville, Kentucky	Iroquois
3	Janee Thompson	5'7"	G	Fr.	Chicago, Illinois	Whitney Young
10	Bernisha Pinkett	5'7"	G	Jr.	Washington, District of Columbia	Howard D. Woodson
11	DeNesha Stallworth	6'3"	C	Jr.	Richmond, California	Pinole Valley/California
12	Jelleah Sidney	6'2"	F/C	Jr.	Queens Village, New York	Saint Michael Academy/Chipola Junior College
13	Bria Goss	5'10"	G	So.	Indianapolis, Indiana	Ben Davis
20	Maegan Conwright	5'8"	G	Jr.	Arlington, Texas	Timberview
23	Samarie Walker	6'1"	F	Jr.	West Carrollton, Ohio	Chaminade-Julienne/Connecticut
31	Samantha Drake	6'3"	C	Jr.	Bardstown, Kentucky	Nelson County
32	Kastine Evans	5'8"	G	Jr.	Salem, Connecticut	Norwich Free Academy
40	Brittany Henderson	6'2"	F	Sr.	Pasadena, California	John Muir
50	Azia Bishop	6'3"	F	So.	Toledo, Ohio	Start

== 2012–13 schedule ==
Date time, TV	Rank^{#}	Opponent^{#}	Result	Record	Site (attendance) city, state
Exhibition
November 5*; 6:00 pm	No. 6	Bellarmine University	W 113–33	–	Memorial Coliseum (2,202); Lexington, KY
Non-conference regular season
November 10*; 1:00 pm	No. 6	at Delaware State	W 90–50	1–0	Memorial Coliseum (4,637); Lexington, KY
November 13*; 6:00 pm, ESPN2	No. 6	at No. 1 Baylor	L 51–85	1–1	Ferrell Center (8,538); Waco, TX
November 17*; 1:00 pm	No. 6	High Point	W 80–46	2–1	Memorial Coliseum (4,169); Lexington, KY
November 23*; 4:00 pm	No. 9	Morehead State	W 73–37	3–1	Memorial Coliseum (4,421); Lexington, KY
November 25*; 1:00 pm, UK IMG/FSN	No. 9	USC Upstate	W 100–34	4–1	Memorial Coliseum (4,223); Lexington, KY
November 28*; 11:00 am	No. 9	Miami (Ohio)	W 92–53	5–1	Memorial Coliseum (6,476); Lexington, KY
December 2*; 6:00 pm, ESPN2	No. 9	at No. 6 Louisville; The Battle For The Bluegrass	W 48–47	6–1	KFC Yum! Center (15,453); Louisville, KY
December 7*; 7:00 pm, UK IMG/FSN	No. 7	DePaul	W 96–64	7–1	Rupp Arena (18,488); Lexington, KY
December 9*; 1:00 pm, UK IMG/FSN	No. 7	Middle Tennessee State	W 68–46	8–1	Memorial Coliseum (4,935); Lexington, KY
December 18*; 10:00 pm	No. 7	at Pepperdine	W 80–62	9–1	Firestone Fieldhouse (413); Malibu, CA
December 21*; 6:00 pm	No. 7	at UC Santa Barbara	W 66–38	10–1	The Thunderdome (853); Santa Barbara, CA
December 28*; 7:00 pm	No. 7	Alcorn State	W 90–23	11–1	Memorial Coliseum (4,831); Lexington, KY
December 30*; 1:00 pm, UK IMG/FSN	No. 7	Marist	W 78–56	12–1	Memorial Coliseum (4,919); Lexington, KY
January 3; 7:00 pm, FSSO	No. 6	Florida	W 76–69	13–1 (1–0)	Memorial Coliseum (4,862); Lexington, KY
January 6; 3:00 pm	No. 6	at Alabama	W 87–70	14–1 (2–0)	Foster Auditorium (1,342); Tuscaloosa, AL
January 10; 7:00 pm, UK IMG/FSN	No. 6	No. 20 Texas A&M	W 65–62	15–1 (3–0)	Memorial Coliseum (5,246); Lexington, KY
January 13; 1:30 pm, ESPNU	No. 6	at Missouri	W 69–43	16–1 (4–0)	Mizzou Arena (2,176); Columbia, MO
January 17; 7:00 pm	No. 5	Mississippi State	W 100–47	17–1 (5–0)	Memorial Coliseum (4,631); Lexington, KY
January 20; 2:00 pm, SECN	No. 5	Auburn	W 97–53	18–1 (6–0)	Memorial Coliseum (5,372); Lexington, KY
January 24; 7:00 pm, SPSO	No. 5	at No. 18 South Carolina	L 50–55	18–2 (6–1)	Colonial Life Arena (3,149); Columbia, SC
January 27; 3:00 pm, SPSO	No. 5	LSU	W 73–60	19–2 (7–1)	Memorial Coliseum (6,428); Lexington, KY
February 3; 2:00 pm, SECN	No. 8	No. 13 Georgia	L 71–75	19–3 (7–2)	Memorial Coliseum (7,016); Lexington, Kentucky
February 7; 8:00 pm	No. 10	at Arkansas	W 80–74 ^{yes}	20–3 (8–2)	Bud Walton Arena (1,935); Fayetteville, AR
February 10; 4:00 pm, ESPN2	No. 10	at Vanderbilt	W 75–53	21–3 (9–2)	Memorial Gymnasium (5,233); Nashville, TN
February 14; 7:00 pm	No. 9	No. 14 South Carolina	W 78–74	22–3 (10–2)	Memorial Coliseum (5,828); Lexington, KY
February 18; 7:00 pm, ESPN2	No. 8	at No. 10 Texas A&M	W 70–66	23–3 (11–2)	Reed Arena (6,814); College Station, TX
February 24; 3:00 pm	No. 8	at LSU	L 72–77	23–4 (11–3)	Pete Maravich Assembly Center (6,773); Baton Rouge, LA
February 28; 8:00 pm	No. 10	at Ole Miss	W 90–65	24–4 (12–3)	Tad Smith Coliseum (637); Oxford, MS
March 3; 3:30 pm, ESPNU	No. 10	No. 8 Tennessee; Rivalry	W 78–65	25–4 (13–3)	Memorial Coliseum (7,965); Lexington, KY
SEC tournament
March 8; 6:00 pm, SPSO	No. 7	vs. Vanderbilt; Quarterfinals	W 76–65	26–4	Arena at Gwinnett Center (N/A); Duluth, GA
March 9; 6:00 pm, ESPNU	No. 7	vs. No. 12 Georgia; Semifinals	W 60–38	27–4	Arena at Gwinnett Center (6,630); Duluth, GA
March 10; 6:00 pm, ESPN2	No. 7	vs. No. 19 Texas A&M; Championship	L 67–75	27–5	The Arena at Gwinnett Center (5,076); Duluth, GA
2013 NCAA tournament
March 24*; 12:05 pm, ESPNU	No. (2)	vs. No. (15) Navy; First Round	W 61–41	28–5	Carnesecca Arena (N/A); Queens, New York
March 26*; 7:00 pm, ESPN2	No. (2)	vs. No. (7) Dayton; Second Round	W 84–70	29–5	Carnesecca Arena (1,144); Queens, NY
March 30*; 12:04 pm, ESPN	No. (2)	vs. No. (6) Delaware; Sweet Sixteen	W 69–62	30–5	Webster Bank Arena (N/A); Bridgewater, CT
April 1; 7:30 pm, ESPN	No. 8 (2)	vs. No. 1 (1) Connecticut; Elite Eight	L 53–83	30–6	Webster Bank Arena (8,594); Bridgeport, CT
*Non-conference game. ^{#}Rankings from AP Poll. (#) Tournament seedings in parentheses. All times are in Eastern Time.

== Player stats ==
Player	Games Played	Minutes	Field Goals	Three Pointers	Free Throws	Rebounds	Assists	Blocks	Steals	Points

== Regular season notes ==
- Bernisha Pinkett finished with career highs of 21 points, 10 rebounds and 5 assists against Miami (OH) on November 28.
- UK set new single-game attendance record of 18,488 vs. DePaul on December 7 in Rupp Arena. The previous record was 14,508 on December 8, 2011, vs. Duke.
- DeNesha Stallworth was named SEC Player of the Week on December 10.
- Kentucky defeated Mississippi State, 100–47, on January 17. The 53-point margin of victory is the largest against an SEC opponent in school history.
- DeNesha Stallworth scored a career-high 25 points in 24 minutes against Mississippi State
- A'dia Mathies was named SEC Player of the Week on January 21.
- Kentucky won a school record 17 straight games from November 17 to January 24.
- Kentucky set a school record with a 34-game home winning streak.
