= 2013 SEC women's basketball tournament =

- Classification: Division I
- Season: 2012–13
- Teams: 14
- Site: Arena at Gwinnett Center; Duluth, Georgia
- Champions: Texas A&M (1st title)
- Winning coach: Gary Blair
- MVP: Kelsey Bone (Texas A&M)
- Attendance: 20,497
- Television: FSS, SPSO, ESPNU, ESPN2

2012–13 SEC women's basketball standings
	Conf.				Overall
Team	W		L	PCT	W		L	PCT
No. 10 Tennessee	14	–	2	.875	27	–	8	.771
No. 7 Kentucky	13	–	3	.813	30	–	6	.833
No. 14 Georgia	12	–	4	.750	28	–	7	.800
No. 17 South Carolina	11	–	5	.688	25	–	8	.758
No. 9 Texas A&M †	11	–	5	.688	25	–	10	.714
LSU	10	–	6	.625	22	–	12	.647
Vanderbilt	9	–	7	.563	21	–	12	.636
Arkansas	6	–	10	.375	20	–	13	.606
Florida	6	–	10	.375	22	–	15	.595
Missouri	6	–	10	.375	17	–	15	.531
Auburn	5	–	11	.313	19	–	15	.559
Mississippi State	5	–	11	.313	13	–	17	.433
Alabama	2	–	14	.125	13	–	18	.419
Ole Miss	2	–	14	.125	9	–	20	.310
† 2013 SEC tournament winner Rankings from AP poll

The 2013 Southeastern Conference women's basketball tournament was the postseason women's basketball tournament for the Southeastern Conference held from March 6 to 10, 2013 in Duluth, Georgia at the Arena at Gwinnett Center. The first and second rounds and the quarterfinal round was televised through FSS and SPSO, and the semifinals and finals was broadcast nationally on ESPNU and ESPN2.

== Format ==
With the addition of Missouri and Texas A&M to the league, the tournament likewise expanded to 14 teams. As in previous years, the top four teams received byes to the quarterfinals; these byes became double-byes with the addition of a new round featuring the four lowest seeds (11 through 14; seeds 5 through 10 receive a single bye into the second round). After these matchups on the first day, the rest of the tournament proceeded as in previous years, with the 11/14 and 12/13 winners facing, respectively, seeds 6 and 5, and seeds 7 & 10 and 8 & 9 also squaring off in the second round. The four winners on the second day joined the top four seeds in the quarterfinals.

This year, Ole Miss chose to self-impose a post-season ban, so the teams were seeded 1–13, and the 11 seed received a single-bye.

== Schedule ==
Session	Game	Time*	Matchup^{#}	Television	Attendance
First Round – Wednesday, March 6
1	1	6:00 PM	Mississippi State vs. Alabama	FSS	
Second Round – Thursday, March 7
2	2	12:00 PM	Arkansas vs. Florida	SPSO	
2	3	2:30 PM	South Carolina vs. Alabama	SPSO	
3	4	6:00 PM	Vanderbilt vs. Missouri	SPSO	
3	5	8:30 PM	LSU vs. Auburn	SPSO	
Quarterfinals – Friday, March 8
4	6	12:00 PM	Tennessee vs. Florida	SPSO	
4	7	2:30 PM	Texas A&M vs. South Carolina	SPSO	
5	8	6:00 PM	Kentucky vs. Vanderbilt	SPSO	
5	9	8:30 PM	Georgia vs. LSU	SPSO	
Semifinals – Saturday, March 9
6	10	4:00 PM	Tennessee vs. Texas A&M	ESPNU	
6	11	6:00 PM	Kentucky vs. Georgia	ESPNU	
Championship Game – Sunday, March 10
7	12	6:00 PM	Texas A&M vs. Kentucky	ESPN2	
*Game Times in ET. #-Rankings denote tournament seed

== Bracket ==
First round Wednesday, March 6 Fox Sports South
13	Alabama	63
12	Mississippi State	36

Second round Thursday, March 7 SPSO
9	Florida	64
8	Arkansas	59
13	Alabama	35
5	South Carolina	77
10	Missouri	40
7	Vanderbilt	53
11	Auburn	62
6	LSU	65

Quarterfinals; Friday, March 8 SPSO
9	Florida	73
1	Tennessee	82
5	South Carolina	52
4	Texas A&M	61
7	Vanderbilt	65
2	Kentucky	76
6	LSU	53
3	Georgia	71

Semifinals; Saturday, March 9 ESPNU
1	Tennessee	62
4	Texas A&M	66
2	Kentucky	60
3	Georgia	38

Championship Game; Sunday, March 10; ESPN2
4	Texas A&M	75
2	Kentucky	67
