= 2011–12 Baylor Lady Bears basketball team =

Intercollegiate basketball season

2011–12 Baylor Lady Bears basketball

NCAA tournament National Champions Big 12 Tournament champions Big 12 regular season champions Preseason Women's NIT champions
- Conference: Big 12 Conference

Ranking
- Coaches: No. 1
- AP: No. 1
- Record: 40–0 (18–0 Big 12)
- Head coach: Kim Mulkey (12th season)
- Assistant coaches: Bill Brock; Damion McKinney; Rekha Patterson
- Home arena: Ferrell Center

2011–12 Big 12 Conference women's basketball standings
	Conf.				Overall
Team	W		L	PCT	W		L	PCT
No. 1 Baylor †	18	–	0	1.000	40	–	0	1.000
Oklahoma	11	–	7	.611	21	–	13	.618
No. 22 Texas A&M	11	–	7	.611	24	–	11	.686
Iowa State	9	–	9	.500	18	–	13	.581
Kansas State	9	–	9	.500	20	–	14	.588
Kansas	8	–	10	.444	21	–	13	.618
Oklahoma State	8	–	10	.444	22	–	12	.647
Texas	8	–	10	.444	18	–	14	.563
Texas Tech	6	–	12	.333	21	–	14	.600
Missouri	2	–	16	.111	13	–	18	.419
† 2012 Big 12 Tournament winner Rankings from AP poll

The 2011–12 Baylor Lady Bears women's basketball team represented Baylor University during the 2011–12 NCAA Division I women's basketball season. Returning as head coach was Hall of Famer Kim Mulkey. The team played its home games at the Ferrell Center in Waco, Texas and were members of the Big 12 Conference.

The Lady Bears began the season as the preseason #1 team in both the Associated Press and the Coaches' Poll. They ran through the season undefeated, winning the Big 12 regular season and the Big 12 Tournament. They became the first team in college basketball history (men's or women's) to finish 40–0 by defeating Notre Dame for the national championship. (In 2014 Connecticut matched the Lady Bears 40–0 mark, tying an NCAA record.)

== Roster ==
2011–12 Baylor Lady Bears women's basketball team
Players
Coaches

Pos.	#	Name	Height	Year	Previous school	Hometown
G	0	Odyssey Sims	5 ft 9 in (1.75 m)	So	MacArthur	Irving, TX
G	1	Kimetria Hayden	5 ft 11 in (1.8 m)	Jr	Lincoln	Dallas, TX
G	3	Jordan Madden	6 ft 0 in (1.83 m)	Jr	East Poinsett	Lepanto, AR
G	4	Shanay Washington	6 ft 1 in (1.85 m)	So	Del Valle	Austin, TX
F	10	Destiny Williams	6 ft 1 in (1.85 m)	Jr	Benton Harbor	Benton Harbor, MI
G	14	Makenzie Robertson	5 ft 10 in (1.78 m)	So	Midway	McGregor, TX
G	20	Terran Condrey	5 ft 7 in (1.7 m)	Sr	Eufaula	Eufaula, AL
F/C	22	Sune Agbuke	6 ft 4 in (1.93 m)	Fr	Cornerstone Christian	San Antonio, TX
C	24	Ashley Field	6 ft 2 in (1.88 m)	Sr	Faith Academy	Burnet, TX
G	25	Lindsay Palmer	5 ft 10 in (1.78 m)	Sr	Union	Tulsa, OK
G/F	32	Brooklyn Pope	6 ft 1 in (1.85 m)	RS Jr	Rutgers	Fort Worth, TX
C	42	Brittney Griner	6 ft 9 in (2.06 m)	Jr	Nimitz	Houston, TX
F	44	Mariah Chandler	6 ft 2 in (1.88 m)	Jr	Southwest Atlanta Christian	Atlanta, GA

Head coach

- Kim Mulkey (Louisiana Tech)

Assistant coach(es)

- Bill Brock (Southeastern Oklahoma State)
- Damion McKinney (Midwestern State)
- Rekha Patterson (North Carolina A&T)

Legend

- (C) Team captain
- (S) Suspended
- (I) Ineligible
- (W) Walk-on
- Injured
- Current redshirt

Roster

== Schedule ==
Date time, TV	Rank^{#}	Opponent^{#}	Result	Record	Site (attendance) city, state
Regular season
2011/11/11*; 6:30 p.m.	No. 1	Howard; Women's NIT	W 82–28	1–0 (0–0)	Ferrell Center (7,587); Waco, Texas
2011/11/13*; 2:00 p.m.	No. 1	Chattanooga; Women's NIT	W 91–31	2–0 (0–0)	Ferrell Center (7,005); Waco, Texas
2011/11/17*; 7:00 p.m.	No. 1	UCLA; Women's NIT	W 83–50	3–0 (0–0)	Ferrell Center (7,577); Waco, Texas
2011/11/20*; 1:00 p.m., CBS College Sports	No. 1	No. 2 Notre Dame; Women's NIT	W 94–81	4–0 (0–0)	Ferrell Center (9,477); Waco, Texas
2011/11/22*; 6:30 p.m.	No. 1	Yale	W 109–59	5–0 (0–0)	Ferrell Center (7,681); Waco, Texas
2011/11/27*; 1:00 p.m., ESPN	No. 1	No. 7 Tennessee	W 76–67	6–0 (0–0)	Thompson–Boling Arena (16,623); Knoxville, Tennessee
2011/11/30*; 7:00 p.m.	No. 1	Texas Southern	W 91–39	7–0 (0–0)	Ferrell Center (7,041); Waco, Texas
2011/12/04*; 1:00 p.m.	No. 1	Minnesota	W 89–60	8–0 (0–0)	Williams Arena (3,814); Minneapolis, Minnesota
2011/12/08*; 7:00 p.m.	No. 1	Milwaukee	W 72–41	9–0 (0–0)	Ferrell Center (7,066); Waco, Texas
2011/12/11*; 10:00 a.m., ESPNU	No. 1	St. John's; Maggie Dixon Classic	W 73–59	10–0 (0–0)	Madison Square Garden (n/a); New York, New York
2011/12/18*; 7:30 p.m., ESPN	No. 1	No. 2 Connecticut	W 66–61	11–0 (0–0)	Ferrell Center (10,627); Waco, Texas
2011/12/21*; 7:00 p.m.	No. 1	McNeese State	W 90–50	12–0 (0–0)	Ferrell Center (7,516); Waco, Texas
2011/12/30*; 7:00 p.m.	No. 1	Mississippi Valley State	W 93–55	13–0 (0–0)	Ferrell Center (7,634); Waco, Texas
2012/01/04; 7:00 p.m.	No. 1	Missouri	W 90–46	14–0 (1–0)	Ferrell Center (8,017); Waco, Texas
2012/01/07; 7:00 p.m.	No. 1	Iowa State	W 57–45	15–0 (2–0)	Hilton Coliseum (9,103); Ames, Iowa
2012/01/11; 7:00 p.m.	No. 1	Oklahoma State	W 71–44	16–0 (3–0)	Ferrell Center (8,707); Waco, Texas
2012/01/15; 1:30 p.m.	No. 1	Texas	W 77–59	17–0 (4–0)	Frank Erwin Center (9,002); Austin, Texas
2012/01/18; 7:00 p.m., KCEN	No. 1	No. 20 Texas Tech	W 72–64	18–0 (5–0)	United Spirit Arena (12,403); Lubbock, Texas
2012/01/21; 7:00 p.m.	No. 1	No. 22 Kansas State	W 76–41	19–0 (6–0)	Ferrell Center (9,380); Waco, Texas
2012/01/26; 7:00 p.m., FSN	No. 1	Oklahoma	W 89–58	20–0 (7–0)	Lloyd Noble Center (8,103); Norman, Oklahoma
2012/01/28; 7:00 p.m.	No. 1	Kansas	W 74–46	21–0 (8–0)	Ferrell Center (10,006); Waco, Texas
2012/02/01; 7:00 p.m.	No. 1	Missouri	W 71–41	22–0 (9–0)	Mizzou Arena (3,504); Columbia, Missouri
2012/02/04; 7:00 p.m.	No. 1	Kansas State	W 70–41	23–0 (10–0)	Bramlage Coliseum (12,528); Manhattan, Kansas
2012/02/06; 8:00 p.m., ESPN2	No. 1	Oklahoma; Big Monday	W 81–54	24–0 (11–0)	Ferrell Center (8,341); Waco, Texas
2012/02/11; 5:00 p.m., FSN	No. 1	No. 14 Texas A&M	W 71–48	25–0 (12–0)	Ferrell Center (10,627); Waco, Texas
2012/02/15; 7:00 p.m.	No. 1	Oklahoma State	W 81–51	26–0 (13–0)	Gallagher-Iba Arena (2,648); Stillwater, Oklahoma
2012/02/18; 7:00 p.m., KCEN	No. 1	Texas Tech	W 56–51	27–0 (14–0)	Ferrell Center (10,381); Waco, Texas
2012/02/21; 6:30 p.m., FSN Southwest	No. 1	Texas	W 80–59	28–0 (15–0)	Ferrell Center (8,592); Waco, Texas
2012/02/24; 6:30 p.m., FSN	No. 1	Kansas	W 76–45	29–0 (16–0)	Allen Fieldhouse (4,676); Lawrence, Kansas
2012/02/27; 6:00 p.m., ESPN2	No. 1	No. 17 Texas A&M; Big Monday	W 69–62	30–0 (17–0)	Reed Arena (10,265); College Station, Texas
2012/03/03; 11:00 a.m., FSN	No. 1	Iowa State	W 77–53	31–0 (18–0)	Ferrell Center (9,435); Waco, Texas
Big 12 tournament
2012/03/08; 1:30 p.m., FSN	No. 1	Texas Tech; Big 12 Quarterfinals	W 72–48	32–0 (18–0)	Municipal Auditorium (5,542); Kansas City, Missouri
2012/03/09; 12:00 p.m., FSN	No. 1	Kansas State; Big 12 Semifinals	W 86–65	33–0 (18–0)	Municipal Auditorium ( –); Kansas City, Missouri
2012/03/10; 12:00 p.m., FSN	No. 1	No. 22 Texas A&M; Big 12 Finals	W 73–50	34–0 (18–0)	Municipal Auditorium (4,235); Kansas City, Missouri
NCAA tournament
2012/03/18; 1:30 p.m., ESPN2	No. 1	UC-Santa Barbara; NCAA First Round	W 81–40	35–0 (18–0)	Stroh Center (4,205); Bowling Green, Ohio
2012/03/20; 6:05 p.m., ESPNU	No. 1	Florida; NCAA Second Round	W 76–57	36–0 (18–0)	Stroh Center (4,097); Bowling Green, Ohio
2012/03/24; 1:30 p.m., ESPN	No. 1	No. 15 Georgia Tech; NCAA Sweet Sixteen	W 83–68	37–0 (18–0)	Wells Fargo Arena (7,941); Des Moines, Iowa
2012/03/26; 6:00, ESPN	No. 1	No. 9 Tennessee; NCAA Elite Eight	W 77–58	38–0 (18–0)	Wells Fargo Arena (9,068); Des Moines, Iowa
2012/04/01; 8:00 p.m., ESPN	No. 1	No. 2 Stanford; NCAA Final Four	W 59–47	39–0 (18–0)	Pepsi Center (19,028); Denver, Colorado
2012/04/03; 7:30 p.m., ESPN	No. 1	No. 4 Notre Dame; NCAA Championship Game	W 80–61	40–0 (18–0)	Pepsi Center (19,028); Denver, Colorado
*Non-conference game. ^{#}Rankings from AP Poll. (#) Tournament seedings in parentheses. All times are in Central Time.

== See also ==
- 2011-12 Baylor Bears basketball team
