= 2012 NCAA Division I women's basketball tournament =

College basketball championship in Denver

- Teams: 64
- Finals site: Pepsi Center, Denver, Colorado
- Champions: Baylor Bears (2nd title, 2nd title game, 3rd Final Four)
- Runner-up: Notre Dame Fighting Irish (3rd title game, 4th Final Four)
- Semifinalists: Stanford Cardinal (11th Final Four); Connecticut Huskies (13th Final Four)
- Winning coach: Kim Mulkey (2nd title)
- MOP: Brittney Griner (Baylor)

The 2012 NCAA Division I women's basketball tournament began March 17 and concluded April 3, 2012. The Final Four was played at Pepsi Center in Denver. For only the second time in history, and the first time since 1989, all four of the number one seeds made it to the Final Four. Baylor won its second national championship, defeating Notre Dame 80–61 in the championship game. They were the only team to win 40 straight games in a season until Connecticut matched it in 2014.

== Tournament procedure ==
Pending any changes to the format, a total of 64 teams will enter the 2012 tournament. 32 automatic bids shall be awarded to each program that wins their conference's tournament. The remaining 36 bids are "at-large", with selections extended by the NCAA Selection Committee. The tournament is split into four regional tournaments, and each regional has teams seeded from 1 to 16, with the committee ostensibly making every region as comparable to the others as possible. The top-seeded team in each region plays the #16 team, the #2 team plays the #15, etc. (meaning where the two seeds add up to 17, that team will be assigned to play another).

The basis for the subregionals returned to the approach used between 1982 and 2002; the top sixteen teams, as chosen in the bracket selection process, hosted the first two rounds on campus.

The Selection Committee will also seed the entire field from 1 to 64.

== Automatically qualified teams ==
Team	Conference	How qualified	Last appearance	# of appearances
Maryland	ACC	Tournament Winner	2011	20
Albany	America East	Tournament Winner	Never	1
Dayton	Atlantic 10	Tournament Winner	2011	3
FGCU	Atlantic Sun	Tournament Winner	Never	1
Baylor	Big 12	Tournament Winner	2011	11
Connecticut	Big East	Tournament Winner	2011	24
Idaho State	Big Sky	Tournament Winner	2007	3
Liberty	Big South	Tournament Winner	2010	14
Purdue	Big Ten	Tournament Winner	2011	22
UC Santa Barbara	Big West	Tournament Winner	2009	14
UTEP	C-USA	Tournament Winner	2008	2
Delaware	CAA	Tournament Winner	2007	3
Green Bay	Horizon League	Tournament Winner	2011	13
Princeton	Ivy League	Regular-season champion	2011	3
Marist	MAAC	Tournament Winner	2011	8
Eastern Michigan	MAC	Tournament Winner	2004	2
Hampton	MEAC	Tournament Winner	2011	6
Creighton	Missouri Valley	Tournament Winner	2002	4
San Diego State	Mountain West	Tournament Winner	2010	9
Sacred Heart	Northeast	Tournament Winner	2009	3
Tennessee–Martin	Ohio Valley	Tournament Winner	2011	2
Stanford	Pac-12	Tournament Winner	2011	26
Navy	Patriot	Tournament Winner	2011	2
Tennessee	SEC	Tournament Winner	2011	31
Samford	SoCon	Tournament Winner	2011	2
McNeese State	Southland	Tournament Winner	2011	2
South Dakota St.	Summit	Tournament Winner	2011	4
UALR	Sun Belt	Tournament Winner	2011	2
Prairie View A&M	SWAC	Tournament Winner	2011	4
Fresno State	WAC	Tournament Winner	2011	4
BYU	WCC	Tournament Winner	2007	9

=== Tournament seeds ===
Des Moines RegionalWells Fargo Arena, Des Moines, Iowa
Seed	School	Conference	Record	Berth type
1	Baylor	Big 12	34–0	Automatic
2	Tennessee	SEC	24–8	Automatic
3	Delaware	Colonial	30–1	Automatic
4	Georgia Tech	ACC	24–8	At-large
5	Georgetown	Big East	22–8	At-large
6	Nebraska	Big Ten	24–8	At-large
7	DePaul	Big East	22–10	At-large
8	Ohio State	Big Ten	25–6	At-large
9	Florida	SEC	19–12	At-large
10	BYU	West Coast	26–6	Automatic
11	Kansas	Big 12	19–12	At-large
12	Fresno State	WAC	28–5	Automatic
13	Sacred Heart	Northeast	25–7	Automatic
14	UALR	Sun Belt	20–13	Automatic
15	Tennessee-Martin	Ohio Valley	23–8	Automatic
16	UC Santa Barbara	Big West	17–15	Automatic

Raleigh RegionalPNC Arena, Raleigh, North Carolina
Seed	School	Conference	Record	Berth type
1	Notre Dame	Big East	30–3	At-large
2	Maryland	ACC	28–4	Automatic
3	Texas A&M	Big 12	22–10	At-large
4	Georgia	SEC	22–8	At-large
5	St. Bonaventure	Atlantic 10	29–3	At-large
6	Arkansas	SEC	23–8	At-large
7	Louisville	Big East	22–9	At-large
8	California	Pac-12	24–9	At-large
9	Iowa	Big Ten	19–11	At-large
10	Michigan State	Big Ten	20–11	At-large
11	Dayton	Atlantic 10	23–6	Automatic
12	Florida Gulf Coast	Atlantic Sun	29–2	Automatic
13	Marist	MAAC	25–7	Automatic
14	Albany	America East	23–9	Automatic
15	Navy	Patriot	18–13	Automatic
16	Liberty	Big South	24–8	Automatic

Fresno RegionalSave Mart Center, Fresno, California
Seed	School	Conference	Record	Berth type
1	Stanford	Pac-12	31–1	Automatic
2	Duke	ACC	24–5	At-large
3	St. John's	Big East	22–9	At-large
4	Purdue	Big Ten	24–8	Automatic
5	South Carolina	SEC	23–9	At-large
6	Oklahoma	Big 12	20–12	At-large
7	Vanderbilt	SEC	22–9	At-large
8	West Virginia	Big East	23–9	At-large
9	Texas	Big 12	18–13	At-large
10	Middle Tennessee	Sun Belt	26–6	At-large
11	Michigan	Big Ten	20–11	At-large
12	Eastern Michigan	Mid-American	23–8	Automatic
13	South Dakota State	Summit	24–8	Automatic
14	Creighton	Missouri Valley	20–12	Automatic
15	Samford	Southern	20–12	Automatic
16	Hampton	MEAC	26–4	Automatic

Kingston RegionalRyan Center, Kingston, Rhode Island
Seed	School	Conference	Record	Berth type
1	Connecticut	Big East	29–4	Automatic
2	Kentucky	SEC	25–6	At-large
3	Miami (FL)	ACC	25–5	At-large
4	Penn State	Big Ten	24–6	At-large
5	LSU	SEC	22–10	At-large
6	Rutgers	Big East	22–9	At-large
7	Green Bay	Horizon	30–1	Automatic
8	Kansas State	Big 12	19–13	At-large
9	Princeton	Ivy	24–4	Automatic
10	Iowa State	Big 12	18–12	At-large
11	Gonzaga	West Coast	26–5	At-large
12	San Diego State	Mountain West	25–6	Automatic
13	UTEP	Conference USA	29–3	Automatic
14	Idaho State	Big Sky	24–7	Automatic
15	McNeese State	Southland	26–7	Automatic
16	Prairie View A&M	SWAC	17–15	Automatic

== Schedule and venues ==
The format is similar to the men's tournament, except that there are 64 teams; this in turn means there is no "First Four" round. Thirty-one automatic bids for conference champions and 33 at-large bids were available.

Subregionals were played from March 17 through March 20.

2012 NCAA subregionals

First and Second rounds (Subregionals)

The following 16 sites were used for first- and second-round games:

- Hilton Coliseum, Iowa State University, Ames, Iowa
- Pete Maravich Assembly Center, Louisiana State University, Baton Rouge, Louisiana
- Stroh Center, Bowling Green State University, Bowling Green, Ohio
- Arena at Harbor Yard, Bridgeport, Connecticut, (Host: Fairfield University)
- Carmichael Arena, University of North Carolina at Chapel Hill, Chapel Hill, North Carolina
- Allstate Arena, Rosemont, Illinois (Chicago), (Host: DePaul University)
- Comcast Center, University of Maryland, College Park, College Park, Maryland
- Reed Arena, Texas A&M University, College Station, Texas
- Jack Stephens Center, University of Arkansas at Little Rock, Little Rock, Arkansas
- Memorial Gymnasium, Vanderbilt University, Nashville, Tennessee
- Ted Constant Convocation Center, Old Dominion University, Norfolk, Virginia
- Lloyd Noble Center, University of Oklahoma, Norman, Oklahoma
- Edmund P. Joyce Center, University of Notre Dame, Notre Dame, Indiana
- McCarthey Athletic Center, Gonzaga University, Spokane, Washington
- Donald L. Tucker Center, Tallahassee, Florida, (Host: Florida State University)
- Mackey Arena, Purdue University, West Lafayette, Indiana

Regional semifinals and finals (Sweet Sixteen and Elite Eight)

The Regionals, named for the city rather than the region of geographic importance since 2005, were held from March 24 to March 27 at these sites:

2012 NCAA Regionals and Final Four
- Des Moines Regional, Wells Fargo Arena, Des Moines, Iowa (Host: University of Northern Iowa)
- Fresno Regional, Save Mart Center, Fresno, California (Host: California State University, Fresno)
- Kingston Regional, Ryan Center, Kingston, Rhode Island (Host: University of Rhode Island)
- Raleigh Regional, PNC Arena, Raleigh, North Carolina, (Host: North Carolina State University)

National semifinals and championship (Final Four and championship)

- April 1 and 3
  - Pepsi Center, Denver, Colorado (Hosts: Mountain West Conference and Indiana University – Purdue University Indianapolis)

It was the first time that Denver had hosted a Women's Final Four Basketball tournament.

== Tournament records ==
- Most three-point field goals—Courtney Moses hit nine three-point field goals for Purdue against South Dakota, the most three-pointers scored in an NCAA tournament game. Sydney Wallace hit eight three-point field goals for Georgia Tech in a game against Baylor, tied for the second most in an NCAA tournament game.
- Most free throws—Natalie Novosel hit 18 free throws for Notre Dame in a game against California, the most free throws recorded in an NCAA tournament game.
- Fewest points–Connecticut held Kansas State to 26 points, the fewest recorded in an NCAA tournament game.

== Game summaries ==
=== Des Moines Region ===
==== First round ====
BYU held a small, two-point lead at half-time, which evaporated when DePaul opened the second half with a 14–0 run. BYU chipped at the lead, and cut the lead to three points late in the game. With one second left in the game, the lead was three, and Haley Steed launched a three-point attempt that many, including BYU coach Jeff Judkins, thought it was going in. It did not, and DePaul secured the round, and hit a final foul shot to win the game, 59–55.

The last time Tennessee-Martin beat Tennessee, Pat Summitt, then Pat Head, was playing for the Tennessee-Martin team. Tennessee held Heather Butler to 14 points, almost ten points below her usual average, which made her the third leading scorer in the nation. Tennessee-Martin was held to under 30% shooting, and Tennessee won the opening round game 72–49.

Florida opened the game with a 9–0 run and lead 12–2 early in the game. Ohio State would play roughly even with Florida the rest of the way, occasionally cutting the margin, once to two points, but never taking the lead. Florida won in the match up between eight and nine seeds, 70–65.

Georgetown extended a ten-point halftime lead to 17, but gave most of the lead back. Fresno State cut the lead to three, and had possession of the ball with a chance to tie the game. Fresno State turned the ball over on several of their final possessions, while Georgetown missed free throws to keep the outcome in doubt until the final seconds. The Hoyas hung on to win 61–56.

Brittney Griner only played 22 minutes, but she wasn't needed in an easy win against UC Santa Barbara. The Bears cruised to a 30 points margin in the first half and Baylor easily beat the Gauchos 81–40.

Sydney Wallace, a freshman at Georgia Tech, scored 28 points, in a match up against Sacred Heart. The Yellow Jackets build a large lead early, and were never threatened again by the Pioneers, who were playing in their third NCAA tournament since 2006 but still looking for their first won. The final score was 76–50.

In her first NCAA appearance, Elena Delle Donne had 39 points when she was removed from the game by her coach. At the time, the opposing team, Arkansas, Little Rock, had not yet scored 39 points. They would go on to score a total of 42, but the Fightin' Blue Hens of Delaware scored 73, to win their first ever NCAA tournament game.

Kansas hasn't been to the NCAA tournament since 1999. They narrowly made the field, but were going through a rough patch, losing all but two of their final eight games, and losing their leading scorer, Carolyn Davis, to a season-ending knee injury. Despite facing a higher seeded team in Nebraska, they managed to outscore their opponents and beat the Huskers 57–49.

==== Second round ====
The game between Tennessee and DePaul was a rematch of an earlier season game played at the Maggie Dixon Classic, won by Tennessee 84–61. In that game, starting point guard Ariel Massengale was not available due to injury, while DePaul's Keisha Hampton scored 14 for DePaul. Since that match up, Massengale returned from injury, and Hampton was lost to a season-ending injury. Despite the changes in available players, DePaul stayed close to the Volunteers in the first half, ending the half with a five-point deficit. Tennessee's Glory Johnson had a career-high 21 rebounds to help Tennessee pull away in the second half, and the Volunteers won, 63–48.

Brittney Griner went almost twelve minutes before scoring, but ended up with 25 points. She only had eight points in the first half, when Baylor pulled to a nine-point margin over Florida. The Lady Bears extended the margin to 13 in the opening minutes of the second half, and the Gators were never close again. The final score was in favor of Baylor, 76–57.

Georgia Tech is no stranger to the NCAA tournament, but had never advanced beyond the second round. This year's team set a record for victories in their conference, and overall victories, and received a 4 seed, their highest seed ever. The game against 5 seeded Georgetown was close early, but the Yellow Jackets pulled to a ten-point margin at halftime. The Hoyas were never closer than ten points in the final twelve minutes of the game, and Georgia Tech went on to win, 76–64.

Delaware reached halftime with a six-point lead over eleventh seeded Kansas, but the Jayhawks came on strong in the second half. Even though The Blue Hens Elena Delle Donne would score 34 points, her teammates combined would contribute fewer points, and Kansas would start the second half with a 19–6 run to take the lead, which they would never relinquish. Kansas won 70–64 to advance to the Sweet Sixteen.

==== Sweet sixteen ====
Kansas started the game against Tennessee with a strong performance, working their way out to a 14-point lead. The Volunteers would cut into the lead and reduce it to five at halftime. In the second half, the Tennessee team, behind 22 points off the bench from Meighan Simmons, and took over the lead, then extended it to double digits. Tennessee ended up with the win, 84–73.

Georgia Tech out scored Baylor by one in the second half, but that result was academic, as the Bears had out together a 16-point lead by halftime. Georgia Tech's Sydney Wallace scored 32 points, but Brittney Griner had 35 for Baylor to help lead them to a win, 83–68.

==== Elite eight ====
Tennessee pulled out to an early 9–5 lead, but Baylor quickly responded. Brittney Griner was one block short of a triple double, and Baylor ended up winning by 19, 77–58. An incident occurred in the last minute of the game between Odyssey Sims and Shekinna Stricklen, resulting in a technical foul for each. Three players, including Griner, came off the bench, and were ejected. At the pro level, an ejection for leaving the bench brings with it a suspension for the subsequent game, but the rule is different in the NCAA. The loss prevented the Tennessee team from reaching the Final Four; the seniors in this class are the first class in Tennessee history to fail to make it to a Final Four.

===== Most Outstanding Player and All-Tournament team =====
- Brittney Griner, Baylor – Most Outstanding Player
- Odyssey Sims, Baylor
- Glory Johnson, Tennessee
- Destiny Williams, Baylor
- Shekinna Stricklen, Tennessee

=== Fresno Region ===
==== First round ====
Early in the match up between top seeded Stanford and 16th seeded Hampton, the Pirates were staying close to the Cardinal, trailing at one time by one point, 22–21. However, Stanford then went on a 13–0 run, and the Pirates were never close again, falling 73–51.

West Virginia's leading rebounder, Ayana Dunning, picked up her fourth foul and headed to the bench less than six minutes into the second half. Texas, who were down 13 points at halftime, climbed back into the game, and cut the lead to three points. WVU's Taylor Palmer scored 13 of her overall 18 points in the second half, with one three-pointer coming after a five-minute stretch without any score by the Mountaineers. West Virginia then stretched out the lead, and won the game, 68–55.

South Carolina faced Eastern Michigan, whose Tavelyn James is the second leading scorer in the nation at 24 points per game. The Gamecocks were effective on defense, holding James to just 11 points, and the entire team to 48. South Carolina went on to win 80–48.

The game plan of South Dakota State's head coach Aaron Johnston including containing Purdue's leading scorer Brittany Rayburn. That part of the plan was executed, as Rayburn scored 12 points. However, Johnston hadn't planned on the Boilermakers' Courtney Moses setting an NCAA record for three-pointers in a game. She hit nine, for 27 of her 29 points, helping lead the team to an 83–68 victory.

Vanderbilt is about forty miles from Middle Tennessee, but the two teams haven't played in twenty years. Vanderbilt moved out to a small seven-point lead at halftime, then went on a 20–5 run in the second half to put the game out of reach. Vanderbilt prevailed, 60–46.

The fourteen seed has never beaten a three seed, but Creighton came very close to breaking that streak. St. Johns had the ball and a two-point lead when pressure defense appeared to force the ball out of bounds. The St. Johns coach had called time out in time, but when the officials reviewed the replay, they noticed an elbow to the face by a St. Johns player. That gave two free throws to Creighton, and the ball. Creighton tied the game, but was unable to score on that possession. St. Johns had the ball with about five second left in the game, when Nadirah McKenith ran the length of the court, putting in a basket with 0.1 on the clock, securing the 69–67 victory.

Duke's Elizabeth Williams is nursing a stress fracture, but still managed to be one of four Blue Devils with double-digit scoring. The game started with Duke pulling out to a 23–7 lead; Samford was never able to make the game close, in just its second appearance in the tournament.

Oklahoma's Aaryn Ellenberg played only seven minutes in the first half of the game because of foul trouble, but made up for it in the second half. She scored 28 points, playing on her home court, to help lead the Sooners to an 88–67 victory over Michigan.

==== Second round ====
West Virginia played Stanford even in the second half, but they had been out scored by 17 in the first half, so the second half did not move them closer to their goal. Stanford had put together a 17–0 run in the first half, and that would match the halftime and final margin. The freshman point guard for the Cardinal, Amber Orrange took home scoring honors with 18 points, and had five assists while committing zero turnovers. The Cardinal beat the Mountaineers 72–55.

Dawn Staley, the South Carolina head coach, made it to the sweet sixteen several times as a player, but had not reached that level as a coach. They faced fourth seeded Purdue in a match up to determine who would advance to the sweet sixteen in the Fresno region. The Gamecocks held the Boilermakers to under 40% shooting for the game, and extended a seven-point half time lead to an eleven-point final margin, winning the game 72–61, and advancing to the regional game in Fresno, California.

It was unseasonably hot in Vanderbilt's Memorial Gym, both in terms of temperature and shooting. The gym does not have air conditioning, resulting in temperatures reaching the 90's. Duke hit 42 baskets in 65 attempts, just short of 66%. While the Commodores would score 80 points, the Blue Devils scored 96, to end up with a 16-point margin. Duke's Haley Peters set a career high mark with 25 points.

St. Johns took on Oklahoma on their home floor, where they were 8–1 in previous NCAA Tournament games. They allowed the Sooners to shoot almost 48% from the field and score 70 points. St. Johns had not won a game this year when giving up 70 points. Despite that, the Red Storm managed to score 74, so ended up with a win and a trip to the Sweet Sixteen.

==== Sweet sixteen ====
St. John's would have the leading scorer of the game with Da'Shena Stevens, who scored 19 points, but the team as a whole shot under 35%, against Duke's 54%. The Blue Devils scored sixteen consecutive points in one run spanning halftime which put the game out of reach. Duke won 74–47.

South Carolina stayed close to Stanford for much of their game, but could not overcome the Cardinal. The Ogwumike sisters filled the stat sheet with Nneka scoring 39 points and pulling down ten rebounds, while sister Chiney lead the team in blocks and steals. Stanford pulled away late, then used a 9–0 run to put the game out of reaching, winning the game 76–60.

==== Elite eight ====
Once again, the Ogwumike sisters contributed significantly to a Stanford victory. Nneka scored 29 points, while younger sister Chiney was the rebounding leader with 17. The Cardinal pulled out to a 15-point lead at halftime. Although the Duke Blue Devils were able to outscore Stanford in the second half, they only reduced the final margin to twelve, 81–69.

===== Most Outstanding Player and All-Tournament team =====
- Nnemkadi Ogwumike, Stanford–Most Outstanding Player
- Chiney Ogwumike, Stanford
- Chelsea Gray, Duke
- Elizabeth Williams, Duke
- Da’Shena Stevens, St. John's ( N Y)

=== Raleigh Region ===
==== First round ====
Arkansas faced a double-digit deficit in the first half, but pulled even by halftime. In the second half, the defense of Arkansas prevailing, holding the Dayton flyers to zero field goals in the last twelve minutes of the game. The Razorbacks won, 72–55.

The defending national champion Aggies held only a four-point lead at halftime over Albany, playing in its first ever NCAA Tournament appearance. The Great Danes were on a ten-game winning streak, but were unable to extend the run to eleven, as Texas A&M extended the lead in the second half, and won 69–47.

After not sleeping well, Maryland's Alyssa Thomas struggled in the first half. She only had five points in the first half, while her team missed five of its first seven shots and fell behind early 8–4. The Terrapins moved out to a seven-point lead over Navy by the half, and after coach Brenda Frese urged Thomas to settle down, Thomas scored a dozen in the second half, and help lead the team to a 59–44 victory over the Midshipmen.

The venue for Louisville's head coach Jeff Walz was familiar, as they were playing at Maryland, where he had served as an assistant coach for several years, including a national championship. The opponent were the Spartans, whose senior class had won at least one game in each of the prior three NCAA tournaments. The Cardinals would frustrate that streak, holding Michigan State to 55 points, and winning the game 67–55.

There have been nine wins by thirteen seeds in history, and Marist now has three of them. Free throws shooting (21–25) helped the Red Foxes win the biggest upset of the tournament so far. The Georgia Bulldogs out-rebounded Marist 33–27, and took 21 more field goal attempts, but over 50% shooting by Marist helped the Red Foxes defeat Georgia 79–70.

None of the players on the California team have competed in an NCAA tournament game, but the team did not show it early on, as they took a nine-point lead at the half, and built it to a 16-point lead in the second half. Iowa made a run, and cut the lead to seven, but cut not get closer, and lost to the Golden Bears, 84–74.

Notre Dame scored the first eleven points before the two-minute mark, giving the Irish a chance to rest starters. The lead was 25 at halftime, and extended to a 31-point margin at the end, as Notre Dame beat Liberty 74–43.

Florida Gulf Coast, transitioning into NCAA Division I, took St. Bonaventure to overtime in the first NCAA appearance for both teams. The Eagles were on a 21-game winning streak and hit their 341st three-pointer of the season, setting an NCAA season record, but were unable to hold on to a double-digit lead. They were outscored in overtime by seven and ended up losing 72–65.

==== Second round ====
Arkansas fell behind by double digits, then rallied against Dayton to win their first-round game. Against, Texas A&M they fell behind by double digits again, with a 14-point deficits in the second half and rallied again, taking a one-point lead late in the game. However, this time the Razorbacks could not hold the lead, and the Aggies' Sydney Carter hit two free throws with 23 seconds left in the game to give the Aggies the win 61–59.

The Maryland-Louisville game set up a rematch between Jeff Walz, the head coach of Louisville, but former assistant at Maryland to Brenda Frese. Louisville had knocked Maryland out of the 2009 NCAA tournament, but this time the Terrapins would prevail. It was a close battle with an early lead by Louisville, then small leads by Maryland in the second half. Maryland held a three-point lead in the closing seconds when Becky Burke launched a potential tying shot that was tipped by Maryland. The Terrapins hit a final foul shot to win 72–68.

St. Bonaventure faced Marist in the second-round game. It is the first visit to the NCAA tournament for the Bonnies. Marist has been here before, but was the lowest seed left in the tournament. The two teams faced each other in the regular season, with St. Bonaventure winning by eleven in their December game. The result would be the same this time, but much closer, as Marist missed a closing seconds three-point shot that would have tied the game. The Bonnies beat the Red Foxes 66–63.

California scored more field goals than Notre Dame, and made more three-pointers, but the Fighting Irish, playing on their home court, had more points from the free throw line. The game was tied at 31 all at halftime, but Notre Dame had an 8–2 run to open the second half. The Golden Bears tried to come back, but did not get closer than nine points in the late part of the game. Natalie Novosel hit 18 of her 20 free throw attempts, while the entire team hit almost 80% (26 for 33) in the game to end up with the win, 73–62.

==== Sweet sixteen ====
The defending national champion Texas A&M pulled out to an 18-point lead against Maryland. Although the Terrapins would cut the lead to three at the break, the Aggies stretched the lead back to 11 early in the second half. Maryland used a rebounding margin of 42–30 to earn more second chance points, and went on to win 81–74.

St. Bonaventure was never in the game with Notre Dame. The Irish started out on a 16–2 run. The Bonnies didn't get their second basket until more than halfway through the first half. Notre Dame shot over 50%, while holding the Bonnies to 19%. The Irish would go on to win easily 79–35.

==== Elite eight ====
Notre Dame's Skylar Diggins had a triple-double in points assists and rebound to help lead the Irish to a 31-point victory over Maryland. Although the game was close for the first few minutes, Notre Dame went on a 26–7 run to reach a 19-point margin by halftime, and stretched the margin in the second half, winning 80–49.

==== Most Outstanding Player and All-Tournament team ====
- Skylar Diggins, Notre Dame–Most Outstanding Player
- Alyssa Thomas, Maryland
- Natalie Achonwa, Notre Dame
- Kayla McBride, Notre Dame
- Natalie Novosel, Notre Dame
- Alexia Standish, Texas A&M

=== Kingston Region ===
==== First round ====
Connecticut started the game like they have in so many other first-round games, looking like a potential blowout. UConn scored the first eight points, before Prairie View hit an awkward three-pointer off the glass. However, The Lady Panthers stayed relatively close in the first half, cutting the lead to eight well into the game. Senior Tiffany Hayes, nursing a stress injury, played 17 minutes in the first half, but sat out the second half. Freshman Kaleena Mosqueda-Lewis stepped up, scoring 21 points, tying a UConn record for points in their first NCAA appearance, held by former UConn player and current Cincinnati coach Jamelle Elliott. UConn stretched out the lead in the second half and won 83–47.

Princeton won the last three IVY league regular-season titles, which earned them an invitation to the tournament, but their regular-season performance earned a national ranking, the first time an Ivy League school has been in the AP ranking, so they were a nine seed, rather than the double-digit seeds usually awarded to automatic bids by the Ivy league. They played well against the eight-seeded Kansas State Wildcats, going on a 10–2 run to start the second half, and turn a small halftime deficit into a lead. However, Kansas State's Branshea Brown set a career record for points with 22 and helped the Wildcats hold on for a 67–64 victory.

Gonzaga, which had ridden graduated superstar Courtney Vandersloot to the regional final in 2011, picked up where it had left off a year earlier, achieving the only upset of the day. The Bulldogs, playing on their home court for the second straight year, pulled out to an early lead, with a score of 20–4 ten minutes into the game, and never relinquished the lead. Rutgers managed only one field goal in the first ten minutes of the game. Rutgers scored 50 points in the second half, but even the 28 points by Erica Wheeler were not enough to take over the lead. Gonzaga won, 86–73.

Miami played without one of their top players, Riquna Williams, not present as a result of violating a team rule, but Shenise Johnson scored 20 points to help lead the team to victory over Idaho State. In addition to her points, Johnson had four steals, which made her only the second player in Division I NCAA history to record at least 2,000 points, 1,000 rebounds, 500 assists and 400 steals in a career. The only other player to achieve that level is Nancy Lieberman. The Hurricanes won the game, 70–41.

After winning all but one game in the regular season and conference tournament, Green Bay felt they deserved better than a seven seed. The Phoenix opened the game playing better than a seven seed, and reached a 19-point lead by halftime. The Cyclones scored more points than Green Bay in the second half, but it was not enough to overcome that large lead, and Green Bay went on to win, 71–57.

McNeese State entered the tournament as a fifteen seed, knowing that a fifteen seed had never beaten a two seed in the women's tournament, and remembering that they lost in the opening round in the prior year by 40 points. Despite that, the Cowgirls were only down by three points at the half, and were within six points very late in the game, but could not complete the upset. Kentucky held on to win, 68–62.

UTEP took more shots at the basket than Penn State, made a higher percentage of their shots, had a higher free throw percentage, out rebounded the Lady Lions by nine, had more assists and steals, yet did not outperform their opponents in the most important statistic: points. Penn State was behind much of the first half, and tied at halftime, but took a lead in the second half and ended up winning 85–77.

San Diego State was tied at halftime against LSU, then went on a 7–0 run to take a seven-point lead, but could not hold on to the lead. The Tigers came back, and pulled to an eight-point lead, which matched the final margin of the game, 64–56.

==== Second round ====
Gonzaga was seeded eleventh, despite making it to the Elite Eight in 2011, possibly because Vandersloot had graduated. They still managed two upset wins to advance to the sweet sixteen. This time, they defeated Miami, holding the Hurricanes to under 33% shooting. Home floor and home fans may not have hurt either, as they beat Miami 65–54.

Kentucky pulled out to a 17-point lead at halftime against Green Bay, but managed to give up the entire lead in the second half. Turnovers plagued both teams, with 24 committed by the Phoenix and 34 by the Wildcats. Kentucky shot over 50% from the field, which helped to overcome the turnovers. Green Bay pulled ahead by one point with just under two minutes to play, but Kentucky responded with a basket, and Green Bay's final shot missed everything.

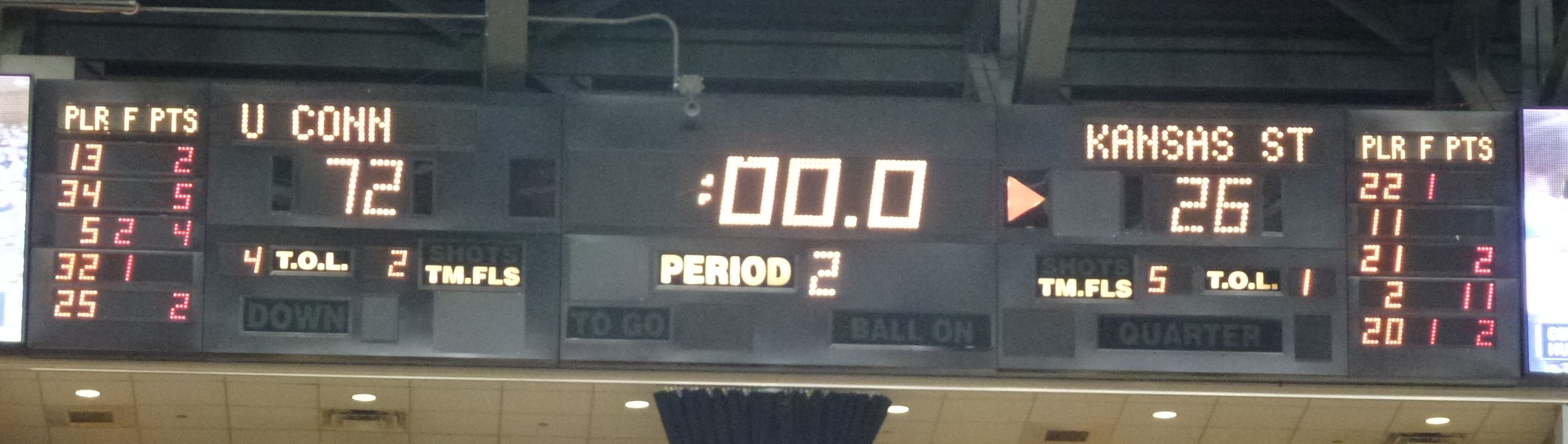
Scoreboard, reflecting record defensive total

After Connecticut scored the first basket of the game, Kansas State responded with a three-pointer taking a 3–2 lead. It would be their last point for over eleven minutes, and their last lead of the game. UConn played a game described as "nearly...flawless defensive game". The Wildcats scored just before halftime to increase their point total to ten, narrowly missing a tie for fewest points in the first half of an NCAA tournament game. They would not be so fortunate in avoiding the complete game record, set by Southern when they scored only 27 points in a game. The Kansas State team reached 26 points with almost three minutes left to play, but would not score again. The Huskies won 72–26.

Even though Penn State started the game on a 9–0 run, the game against LSU game was close through much of the game, with a tie score ten different times. LSU was playing on their home floor, and managed a slim, one-point led at halftime. Their lead was as much as six points in the second half, but the Lady Lion's Maggie Lucas hit five of seven three-pointers, as part of a 30-point scoring effort, to help lead Penn State to a ten-point margin over LSU.

==== Sweet sixteen ====
Gonzaga's Kayla Standish would score 25 points to be the high scorer in their game against Kentucky, but the threes of Kentucky, including five by Keyla Snowden, helped Kentucky win. The Wildcats hit 57% of their three-point attempts, almost as high as their (59%) free throw shooting. Kentucky would lead the game the entire way, winning 79–62.

Dolson hits a foul line jumper against Penn State

Penn State's Alex Bentley was asked about UConn after their win over Kansas State, and she said "I don't think [the Huskies] played against a real, true scoring team". UConn held the two guards, Bentley and Lucas to seven made shots on 31 attempts. In one notable sequence, Kelly Faris leaped to block a three-point attempt by Lucas. Caroline Doty grabbed the ball, and, with her back to her own basket and closely covered, leapt and spun to heave the ball to a streaking Faris, who had to be fouled hard to prevent a score. Bria Hartley would lead all scorers with 20 points, while Kaleena Mosqueda-Lewis had a double-double in points and rebounds off the bench. The game was the 100th NCAA Tournament game in UConn history. UConn has a record of 84–16 in NCAA Tournament games.

==== Elite eight ====
Connecticut opened with a 9–0 run, but Kentucky did not quit, and responded, first closing the gap, then taking a small lead. When the Wildcats hit two free throws with 2.1 seconds in the first half to make the score 39 all, it looked like the score would be tied at halftime, but Tiffany Hayes hit a streaking Kelly Faris who put in a shot at the halftime buzzer to take a two-point lead. In the second half, the Huskies expanded the margin to 20 points, then ended with a 15-point victory, 80–65, to propel the UConn team to their fifth consecutive Final Four, tying an NCAA record.

==== Most Outstanding Player and All-Tournament team ====
- Tiffany Hayes, Connecticut–Most Outstanding Player
- Mia Nickson, Penn State
- Kayla Standish, Gonzaga
- Samarie Walker, Kentucky
- Stefanie Dolson, Connecticut

== Final four ==
=== Semi-finals ===
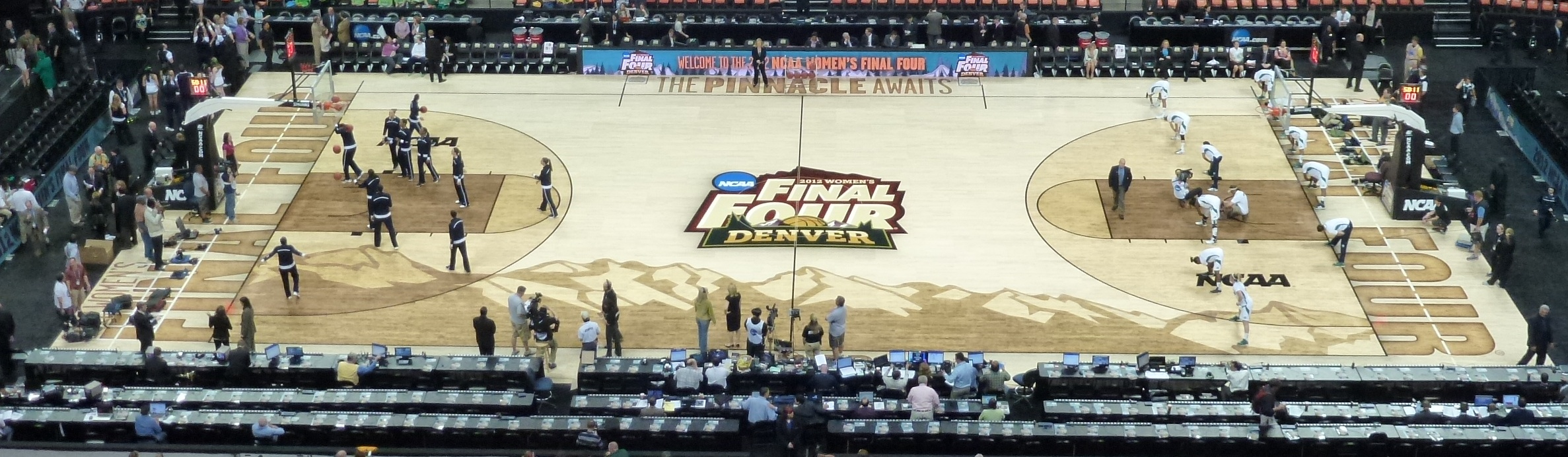
Floor of arena in Pepsi Center, Denver

In the first semi-final game of the evening, UConn faced Notre Dame for the fourth time this season. Notre Dame prevailed in the two regular season games, one of which went to overtime, while UConn won the match-up in the Big East tournament Finals. The Huskies scored first, but Notre Dame quickly responded with seven straight points. The game was close through most of the first half, with UConn holding on to a small three-point halftime lead. The Irish scored the first five points of the second half to take the lead, and would hold on to a slim lead for much of the rest of the half. With under three minutes left in the half, Notre Dame had a six-point lead, but UConn managed to come back and took a two-point lead with eleven seconds left, but Notre Dame responded to force overtime. Although UConn started the overtime period with a three-point basket, the Irish responded with three-point baskets, one by Diggins, then two by Mallory, to put the game out of reach. The final score in favor of Notre Dame was 83–75.

In the second semi-final, Baylor faced Stanford. Baylor had played, and beaten the other two Final Four participants, but had not played against the Cardinal. The Stanford team was playing in their fifth consecutive Final Four. Stanford's coach, Tara VanDerveer was faced with the challenge of stopping a team with outside and inside threats. The inside threat, Brittney Griner, would be named (the following day) the winner of three national player of the year awards, the Naismith, the Wade Trophy and the WBCA defensive player of the year. VanDerveer chose to emphasize defense on Griner and it had some success, as Griner was limited to seven points in the first half, and the outside shooters did not take advantage. The Cardinal were down at the half, but by only two points. Stanford's Nneka Ogwumike would be the leading scorer for the game, with 22 points, but she was the only double-digit scorer for the Cardinal, while Baylor had three players in double digits. Baylor would go on to the national championship game with a 59–47 victory.

== Bracket ==
Unless otherwise noted, all times listed are Eastern Daylight Time (UTC−04)

All first- and second-round games aired on ESPN2.

=== Des Moines Region ===
First round
1	Baylor	81
16	UC Santa Barbara	40
Bowling Green – Sun/Tues
8	Ohio State	65
9	Florida	70
5	Georgetown	61
12	Fresno State	56
Chapel Hill – Sun/Tues
4	Georgia Tech	76
13	Sacred Heart	50
6	Nebraska	49
11	Kansas	57
Little Rock – Sun/Tues
3	Delaware	73
14	Little Rock	42
7	DePaul	59
10	BYU	55
Rosemont, Illinois – Sat/Mon
2	Tennessee	72
15	Tennessee–Martin	49

Second round
1	Baylor	76
9	Florida	57
5	Georgetown	64
4	Georgia Tech	76
11	Kansas	70
3	Delaware	64
7	DePaul	48
2	Tennessee	63

Regional semifinals
1	Baylor	83
4	Georgia Tech	68
11	Kansas	73
2	Tennessee	84

Regional Finals
1	Baylor	77
2	Tennessee	58

=== Fresno Region ===
First round
1	Stanford	73
16	Hampton	51
Norfolk – Sat/Mon
8	West Virginia	68
9	Texas	55
5	South Carolina	80
12	Eastern Michigan	48
West Lafayette – Sat/Mon
4	Purdue	83
13	South Dakota State	68
6	Oklahoma	88
11	Michigan	67
Norman – Sun/Tues
3	St. John's	69
14	Creighton	67
7	Vanderbilt	60
10	Middle Tennessee	46
Nashville – Sun/Tues
2	Duke	82
15	Samford	47

Second round
1	Stanford	72
8	West Virginia	55
5	South Carolina	72
4	Purdue	61
6	Oklahoma	70
3	St. John's	74
7	Vanderbilt	80
2	Duke	96

Regional semifinals
1	Stanford	76
5	South Carolina	60
3	St. John's	47
2	Duke	74

Regional Finals
1	Stanford	81
2	Duke	69

=== Raleigh Region ===
First round
1	Notre Dame	74
16	Liberty	43
Notre Dame – Sun/Tues
8	California	84
9	Iowa	74
5	St. Bonaventure	72^{OT}
12	FGCU	65
Tallahassee – Sun/Tues
4	Georgia	70
13	Marist	76
6	Arkansas	72
11	Dayton	55
College Station – Sat/Mon
3	Texas A&M	69
14	Albany	47
7	Louisville	67
10	Michigan State	55
College Park – Sat/Mon
2	Maryland	59
15	Navy	44

Second round
1	Notre Dame	73
8	California	62
5	St. Bonaventure	66
13	Marist	63
6	Arkansas	59
3	Texas A&M	61
7	Louisville	68
2	Maryland	72

Regional semifinals
1	Notre Dame	79
5	St. Bonaventure	35
3	Texas A&M	74
2	Maryland	81

Regional Finals
1	Notre Dame	80
2	Maryland	49

=== Kingston Region ===
First round
1	Connecticut	83
16	Prairie View A&M	47
Bridgeport – Sat/Mon
8	Kansas State	67
9	Princeton	64
5	LSU	64
12	San Diego State	56
Baton Rouge – Sun/Tues
4	Penn State	85
13	UTEP	77
6	Rutgers	73
11	Gonzaga	86
Spokane – Sat/Mon
3	Miami (FL)	70
14	Idaho State	42
7	Green Bay	71
10	Iowa State	57
Ames – Sat/Mon
2	Kentucky	68
15	McNeese State	62

Second round
1	Connecticut	72
8	Kansas State	26
5	LSU	80
4	Penn State	90
11	Gonzaga	65
3	Miami (FL)	54
7	Green Bay	62
2	Kentucky	65

Regional semifinals
1	Connecticut	77
4	Penn State	59
11	Gonzaga	62
2	Kentucky	79

Regional Finals
1	Connecticut	80
2	Kentucky	65

=== Final Four – Denver, Colorado ===
National semifinals April 1
DM1	Baylor	59
F1	Stanford	47
R1	Notre Dame	83^{OT}
K1	Connecticut	75

National Championship Game; April 3
DM1	Baylor	80
R1	Notre Dame	61

== Record by conference ==
Conference	Bids	Record	Win %	R64	R32	S16	E8	F4	CG	NC
Pac-12	2	5–2	0.714	2	2	1	1	1	–	–
ACC	4	9–4	0.692	4	4	3	2	–	–	–
Big 12	7	12–6	0.667	7	5	3	1	1	1	1
Big East	8	15–8	0.652	8	7	3	2	2	1	–
SEC	8	12–8	0.600	8	7	3	2	–	–	–
Atlantic 10	2	2–2	0.500	2	1	1	–	–	–	–
Colonial	1	1–1	0.500	1	1	–	–	–	–	–
Horizon	1	1–1	0.500	1	1	–	–	–	–	–
Metro Atlantic	1	1–1	0.500	1	1	–	–	–	–	–
West Coast	2	2–2	0.500	2	1	1	–	–	–	–
Big Ten	7	3–7	0.300	7	2	1	–	–	–	–

- The R64, R32, S16, E8, F4, CG, and NC columns indicate how many teams from each conference were in the round of 64 (first round), round of 32 (second round), Sweet 16, Elite Eight, Final Four, championship game, and national champion, respectively.
- The America East, Atlantic Sun, Big Sky, Big South, Big West, Conference USA, Ivy, MEAC, Mid-American (MAC), Missouri Valley, Mountain West, Northeast, Ohio Valley, Patriot, Southern, Southland, Summit, Sun Belt, SWAC, and WAC conferences each had one representative that was eliminated in the first round.

== All-Tournament team ==
- Brittney Griner, Baylor
- Skylar Diggins, Notre Dame
- Nnemkadi Ogwumike, Stanford
- Odyssey Sims, Baylor
- Destiny Williams, Baylor

== Game officials ==
- Cynthia Brooks (semifinal)
- Dennis DeMayo (semifinal)
- Felicia Grinter (semifinal)
- Cameron Inouye (semifinal)
- Lisa Mattingly (semifinal)
- Michael Price (semifinal)
- Lisa Jones (final)
- Dee Kantner (final)
- Tina Napier (final)
- Charles Gonzales (Standby referee)

== Media coverage ==
=== Television ===
ESPN had US television rights to all games during the tournament. For the first and second round, ESPN aired select games nationally on ESPN or ESPNU. All other games were aired regionally on ESPN or ESPN2 and streamed online via ESPN3. Most of the nation got whip-a-round coverage during this time, which allowed ESPN to rotate between the games and focus the nation on the one that was the closest. The regional semifinals were split between ESPN and ESPN2, and ESPN aired the regional finals, national semifinals, and championship match.

==== Studio host and analysts ====
- Trey Wingo (Host)
- Kara Lawson (Analyst)
- Carolyn Peck (Analyst)

==== Commentary teams ====
First & Second Rounds Saturday/Monday

- Pam Ward and Rebecca Lobo – Bridgeport, Connecticut
- Bob Wischusen and LaChina Robinson – College Park, Maryland
- Mark Jones and Mary Murphy – Norfolk, Virginia
- Brenda VanLengen and Stephen Bardo – West Lafayette, Indiana
- Clay Matvick and Krista Blunk – Ames, Iowa
- Jon Sciambi and Brooke Weisbrod – Chicago, Illinois
- Carter Blackburn and Tamika Raymond – College Station, Texas
- Dave Flemming and Sean Farnham – Spokane, Washington

Sweet Sixteen & Elite Eight Saturday/Monday

- Beth Mowins, Stephanie White, and Samantha Steele – Des Moines, Iowa
- Dave Pasch, Debbie Antonelli, and Heather Cox – Fresno, California

Final Four

- Dave O'Brien, Doris Burke, Rebecca Lobo, and Holly Rowe – Denver, Colorado

First & Second Rounds Sunday/Tuesday

- Cara Capuano and Abby Waner – Bowling Green, Ohio
- Beth Mowins and Stephanie White – Chapel Hill, North Carolina
- Dave O'Brien and Doris Burke – Notre Dame, Indiana
- Justin Kutcher and Nell Fortner – Tallahassee, Florida
- Bob Picozzi and Rosalyn Gold-Onwude – Baton Rouge, Louisiana
- Holly Rowe and Fran Fraschilla – Little Rock, Arkansas
- Dave Pasch and Debbie Antonelli – Nashville, Tennessee
- Marc Kestecher and Kayte Christensen – Norman, Oklahoma

Sweet Sixteen & Elite Eight Sunday/Tuesday

- Pam Ward, Rebecca Lobo, and Allison Williams – Raleigh, North Carolina
- Dave O'Brien, Doris Burke, and Holly Rowe – Kingston, Rhode Island

Championship

- Dave O'Brien, Doris Burke, Rebecca Lobo, and Holly Rowe – Denver, Colorado

== See also ==
- NCAA Women's Division I Basketball Championship
- 2012 NCAA Division I men's basketball tournament
- NCAA Women's Division I tournament bids by school
- 2012 Women's National Invitation Tournament
- 2012 Women's Basketball Invitational
