= 2007–08 NCAA Division I women's basketball rankings =

- Season: 2007–08
- NCAA Tournament: 2008
- Preseason No. 1: Tennessee
- NCAA Tournament Champions: Tennessee
NCAA Division I women's basketball rankings


Two human polls make up the 2007–08 NCAA Division I women's basketball rankings, the AP Poll and the Coaches Poll, in addition to various publications' preseason polls. As the 2007-08 basketball season progresses, rankings are updated weekly.

== Legend ==
	Increase in ranking
	Decrease in ranking
	Not ranked previous week
Italics	Number of first place votes
(#-#)	Win–loss record
T	Tied with team above or below also with this symbol

== AP poll ==
The Associated Press (AP) preseason poll was released on October 29, 2007. This poll is compiled by sportswriters across the nation. In Division I men's and women's college basketball, the AP Poll is largely just a tool to compare schools throughout the season and spark debate, as it has no bearing on postseason play. Generally, all top 25 teams in the poll are invited to the NCAA basketball tournament, also known as March Madness.

	Week 1 Preseason	Week 2 Nov 13	Week 3 Nov 20	Week 4 Nov 27	Week 5 Dec 4	Week 6 Dec 11	Week 7 Dec 18	Week 8 Dec 25	Week 9 Jan 1	Week 10 Jan 8	Week 11 Jan 15	Week 12 Jan 22	Week 13 Jan 29	Week 14 Feb 5	Week 15 Feb 12	Week 16 Feb 19	Week 17 Feb 26	Week 18 Mar 5	Week 19 Mar 10	
1.	Tennessee (50)	Tennessee (50) (1-0)	Tennessee (50) (3-0)	Tennessee (50) (5-0)	Tennessee (48) (6-0)	Tennessee (48) (7-0)	Tennessee (48) (9-0)	Connecticut (49) (9-0)	Connecticut (49) (10-0)	Connecticut (50) (13-0)	Connecticut (50) (15-0)	Connecticut (50) (17-0)	Connecticut (50) (19-0)	Connecticut (50) (21-0)	Tennessee (45) (21-1)	Connecticut (38) (24-1)	Connecticut (39) (26-1)	Connecticut (40) (28-1)	Connecticut (49) (30-1)	1.
2.	Connecticut	Connecticut (1-0)	Connecticut (2-0)	Connecticut (5-0)	Connecticut (2) (6-0)	Connecticut (2) (7-0)	Connecticut (2) (7-0)	Stanford (1) (10-1)	Stanford (1) (12-1)	Tennessee (12-1)	Tennessee (14-1)	Tennessee (16-1)	Tennessee (17-1)	Tennessee (20-1)	Connecticut (5) (22-1)	North Carolina (2) (24-2)	North Carolina (2) (25-2)	North Carolina (2) (27-2)	North Carolina (1) (30-2)	2.
3.	Rutgers	Maryland (2-0)	Maryland (5-0)	Maryland (8-0)	Maryland (10-1)	North Carolina (10-1)	North Carolina (10-1)	Tennessee (10-1)	Tennessee (10-1)	North Carolina (14-1)	North Carolina (16-1)	North Carolina (17-1)	North Carolina (18-2)	North Carolina (19-2)	North Carolina (22-2)	Tennessee (1) (23-2)	Tennessee (1) (25-2)	Tennessee (27-2)	Tennessee (30-2)	3.
4.	Maryland (1)	LSU (2-0)	Stanford (3-0)	North Carolina (7-0)	Rutgers (5-1)	Maryland (13-1)	Maryland (13-1)	North Carolina (12-1)	North Carolina (13-1)	Maryland (18-1)	Maryland (19-1)	Maryland (22-1)	Rutgers (17-2)	Maryland (23-2)	Maryland (25-2)	Maryland (27-2)	Rutgers (8) (22-4)	Rutgers (8) (24-4)	Stanford (29-3)	4.
5.	LSU	Stanford (2-0)	North Carolina (6-0)	Rutgers (3-1)	North Carolina (9-1)	Stanford (7-1)	Stanford (8-1)	Maryland (14-1)	Maryland (16-1)	Rutgers (11-2)	Rutgers (13-2)	Rutgers (15-2)	Maryland (22-2)	Baylor (20-1)	Rutgers (19-3)	Rutgers (8) (20-4)	Maryland (28-2)	Maryland (29-2)	Maryland (30-3)	5.
6.	Oklahoma	Rutgers (0-1)	LSU (3-1)	Stanford (5-1)	Stanford (7-1)	Rutgers (6-2)	Rutgers (8-2)	Rutgers (8-2)	Rutgers (9-2)	Oklahoma (9-2)	Baylor (14-1)	Baylor (16-1)	Baylor (18-1)	Stanford (19-3)	Stanford (22-3)	LSU (1) (22-3)	LSU (23-3)	Stanford (27-3)	LSU (27-5)	6.
7.	Stanford	North Carolina (2-0)	Rutgers (2-1)	Georgia (6-0)	Georgia (8-0)	Georgia (9-0)	Georgia (9-0)	Georgia (10-0)	Georgia (12-0)	Stanford (12-3)	Stanford (14-3)	Stanford (16-3)	Stanford (17-3)	Rutgers (18-3)	LSU (20-3)	Stanford (24-3)	Stanford (25-3)	LSU (25-4)	Rutgers (24-6)	7.
8.	North Carolina	Georgia (2-0)	Georgia (4-0)	LSU (4-2)	LSU (6-2)	LSU (6-2)	LSU (7-2)	LSU (9-2)	Oklahoma (9-2)	Baylor (12-1)	California (15-2)	California (17-2)	LSU (16-3)	LSU (18-3)	Baylor (21-2)	California (23-3)	Baylor (23-3)	Baylor (24-4)	Texas A&M (23-7)	8.
9.	Georgia	Oklahoma (0-1)	Duke (3-)	Oklahoma (2-2)	Oklahoma (4-2)	Oklahoma (6-2)	Oklahoma (7-2)	Oklahoma (8-2)	Baylor (10-1)	California (13-2)	LSU (13-3)	LSU (14-3)	Duke (15-4)	California (19-3)	California (21-3)	Baylor (22-3)	California (23-4)	Notre Dame (23-6)	Duke (23-9)	9.
10.	Duke	Duke (1-0)	Oklahoma (0-2)	Baylor (5-0)	Baylor (6-0)	Baylor (6-0)	Texas A&M (9-1)	Baylor (9-1)	California (11-2)	Georgia (13-1)	Duke (13-3)	Duke (14-4)	California (17-3)	Oklahoma (15-4)	Oklahoma (17-4)	Old Dominion (22-3)	Oklahoma (20-5)	California (24-5)	California (26-5)	10.
11.	Texas A&M	Texas A&M (1-0)	Texas A&M (2-0)	Duke (5-1)	California (7-1)	California (8-1)	Baylor (7-1)	California (9-2)	LSU (10-3)	LSU (11-3)	Oklahoma (10-3)	Oklahoma (11-4)	Oklahoma (13-4)	Duke (16-5)	West Virginia (19-3)	Oklahoma (18-5)	Old Dominion (24-3)	Oklahoma (21-6)	Old Dominion (26-4)	11.
12.	Arizona State	California (1-0)	California (3-0)	California (4-1)	Texas A&M (6-1)	Texas A&M (8-1)	California (8-2)	DePaul (10-0)	Duke (10-3)	Duke (12-3)	Georgia (14-2)	West Virginia (14-3)	West Virginia (16-3)	West Virginia (18-3)	Duke (18-6)	Duke (19-7)	Duke (21-7)	Duke (21-8)	Baylor (24-5)	12.
13.	California	Baylor (3-0)	Baylor (4-0)	Texas A&M (4-1)	West Virginia (7-1)	West Virginia (8-1)	West Virginia (9-1)	Duke (9-3)	Texas A&M (11-2)	Texas A&M (12-2)	George Washington (13-3)	Old Dominion (14-3)	Old Dominion (16-3)	Old Dominion (18-3)	Old Dominion (20-3)	West Virginia (20-4)	West Virginia (22-4)	George Washington (24-5)	Oklahoma State (23-6)	13.
14.	George Washington	George Washington (2-0)	Arizona State (2-1)	Arizona State (3-2)	Auburn (8-0)	Auburn (9-0)	Duke (7-3)	Texas A&M (9-2)	Notre Dame (11-1)	Notre Dame (12-2)	West Virginia (12-3)	Oklahoma State (16-1)	Pittsburgh (16-3)	George Washington (18-4)	George Washington (19-4)	Notre Dame (20-5)	Notre Dame (21-6)	West Virginia (23-5)	Oklahoma (21-7)	14.
15.	Baylor	Arizona State (0-1)	Ohio State (4-0)	West Virginia (5-1)	DePaul (6-0)	Duke (7-3)	DePaul (8-0)	Auburn (11-1)	DePaul (11-1)	Texas (12-2)	Old Dominion (12-3)	Ohio State (15-3)	Wyoming (18-1)	Pittsburgh (17-4)	Oklahoma State (19-3)	Kansas State (18-6)	George Washington (22-5)	Utah (25-3)	Notre Dame (23-8)	15.
16.	Ohio State	Ohio State (1-0)	West Virginia (3-0)	George Washington (5-1)	Notre Dame (6-1)	DePaul (7-0)	Auburn (9-1)	Notre Dame (10-1)	Texas (11-2)	West Virginia (11-2)	Ohio State (13-3)	Notre Dame (15-3)	George Washington (16-4)	Notre Dame (17-5)	Notre Dame (18-5)	Oklahoma State (20-4)	Utah (23-3)	Old Dominion (25-4)	Kansas State (21-8)	16.
17.	Michigan State	Michigan State (2-0)	George Washington (3-1)	DePaul (4-0)	Duke (5-3)	Notre Dame (8-1)	Notre Dame (9-1)	Ohio State (9-2)	West Virginia (10-2)	George Washington (12-3)	Notre Dame (13-3)	Georgia (15-3)	Georgia (16-4)	Oklahoma State (17-3)	Kansas State (16-6)	George Washington (20-5)	Oklahoma State (21-5)	Texas A&M (22-7)	West Virginia (24-6)	17.
18.	West Virginia	Florida State (2-0)	DePaul (3-0)	Auburn (6-0)	Arizona State (4-3)	Arizona State (5-3)	Ohio State (7-2)	West Virginia (10-2)	Auburn (12-2)	Old Dominion (10-3)	Oklahoma State (14-1)	Wyoming (16-1)	Kansas State (14-5)	Kansas State (15-6)	Pittsburgh (18-5)	Utah (21-3)	Ohio State (20-6)	UTEP (25-2)	Utah (27-3)	18.
19.	Florida State	West Virginia (1-0)	Michigan State (2-1)	Ohio State (5-1)	Ohio State (6-2)	Ohio State (6-2)	Texas (8-2)	Texas (9-2)	Old Dominion (9-3)	Ohio State (11-3)	Texas A&M (12-4)	Pittsburgh (14-3)	Ohio State (15-4)	Ohio State (17-5)	Utah (20-3)	UTEP (21-2)	UTEP (23-2)	Kansas State (20-8)	Louisville (23-8)	19.
20.	Pittsburgh	Vanderbilt (2-0)	Florida State (3-1)	Michigan State (5-1)	Vanderbilt (7-2)	Texas (7-2)	Oklahoma State (8-0)	Vanderbilt (9-3)	George Washington (10-3)	Arkansas (15-0)	Wyoming (14-1)	George Washington (14-4)	Notre Dame (15-5)	Utah (18-3)	Texas A&M (17-6)	Ohio State (18-6)	Texas A&M (20-7)	Oklahoma State (22-6)	George Washington (25-6)	20.
21.	Louisville	Texas (1-0)	Texas (2-1)	Florida State (5-1)	Wyoming (6-0)	Michigan State (7-2)	Vanderbilt (8-3)	Wyoming (11-1)	Ohio State (9-3)	Wyoming (12-1)	Auburn (13-4)	Texas A&M (13-5)	Oklahoma State (16-3)	Texas A&M (16-6)	Syracuse (18-4)	Texas A&M (18-7)	Kansas State (18-8)	Vanderbilt (22-7)	Vanderbilt (23-8)	21.
22.	Texas	Louisville (1-0)	Purdue (2-0)	Notre Dame (4-1)	Texas (6-2)	Oklahoma State (8-0)	Arizona State (5-4)	George Washington (9-3)	Wyoming (11-1)	Auburn (12-3)	Pittsburgh (13-3)	Kansas State (12-5)	Syracuse (16-3)	Wyoming (18-3)	Wyoming (19-3)	Syracuse (19-5)	Georgia (20-7)	Ohio State (22-7)	Marist (31-2)	22.
23.	Vanderbilt	Notre Dame (1-0)	Notre Dame (2-1)	Vanderbilt (5-1)	Michigan State (6-2)	Vanderbilt (8-3)	Michigan State (7-3)	Old Dominion (7-3)	Colorado (10-2)	Colorado (11-2)	DePaul (12-3)	Georgia Tech (16-3)	DePaul (15-4)	Syracuse (17-4)	Ohio State (18-6)	Pittsburgh (18-7)	Vanderbilt (20-7)	Georgia (21-8)	UTEP (27-3)	23.
24.	Notre Dame	DePaul (1-0)	Auburn (3-0)	Texas (4-2)	Old Dominion (6-2)	Wyoming (8-1)	Wyoming (9-1)	Oklahoma State (10-1)	Oklahoma State (12-1)	DePaul (11-3)	Texas (12-4)	Syracuse (15-3)	Illinois State (17-1)	Georgia (16-6)	UTEP (19-2)	Georgia (19-7)	Wyoming (22-4)	Marist (28-2)	Virginia (23-9)	24.
25.	DePaul	Wisconsin (1-0)	Vanderbilt (2-1)	Wyoming (4-0)	Oklahoma State (7-0)	Old Dominion (6-3)	Old Dominion (6-3)	Colorado (8-2)	Arkansas (14-0)	Oklahoma State (12-1)	Colorado (12-3)	Auburn (13-5)	Texas (15-5)	DePaul (16-5)	Vanderbilt (18-6)	Vanderbilt (19-7)	Marist (26-2)	Virginia (22-8)	Ohio State (22-8)	25.
	Week 1 Preseason	Week 2 Nov 13	Week 3 Nov 20	Week 4 Nov 27	Week 5 Dec 4	Week 6 Dec 11	Week 7 Dec 18	Week 8 Dec 25	Week 9 Jan 1	Week 10 Jan 8	Week 11 Jan 15	Week 12 Jan 22	Week 13 Jan 29	Week 14 Feb 5	Week 15 Feb 12	Week 16 Feb 19	Week 17 Feb 26	Week 18 Mar 5	Week 19 Mar 10	
		Dropped: Pittsburgh	Dropped: Louisville; Wisconsin	Dropped: Purdue	Dropped: George Washington; Florida State	None	None	Dropped: Arizona State; Michigan State	Dropped: Vanderbilt	None	Dropped: Arkansas	Dropped: DePaul; Texas; Colorado	Dropped: Texas A&M; Georgia Tech; Auburn	Dropped: Illinois State; Texas	Dropped: Georgia; DePaul	Dropped: Wyoming	Dropped: Syracuse; Pittsburgh	Dropped: Wyoming	Dropped: Georgia	

=== ESPN/USA Today Coaches Poll ===
The Coaches Poll is the second oldest poll still in use after the AP Poll. It is compiled by a rotating group of 31 college Division I head coaches. The Poll operates by Borda count. Each voting member ranks teams from 1 to 25. Each team then receives points for their ranking in reverse order: Number 1 earns 25 points, number 2 earns 24 points, and so forth. The points are then combined and the team with the highest points is then ranked #1; second highest is ranked #2 and so forth. Only the top 25 teams with points are ranked, with teams receiving first place votes noted the quantity next to their name. Any team receiving votes after the top 25 are listed after the top 25 by their point totals. However, these are not real rankings: They are not considered #26, #27, etc. The maximum points a single team can earn is 775. The preseason poll was released on 2007-10-29.

	Week 1 Preseason	Week 2 Nov 13	Week 3 Nov 20	Week 4 Nov 27	Week 5 Dec 4	Week 6 Dec 11	Week 7 Dec 18	Week 8 Dec 25	Week 9 Jan 1	Week 10 Jan 8	Week 11 Jan 15	Week 12 Jan 22	Week 13 Jan 29	Week 14 Feb 5	Week 15 Feb 12	Week 16 Feb 19	Week 17 Feb 26	Week 18 Mar 4	Week 19 Mar 11	Week 20 Mar 17	Final Apr 10	
1.	Tennessee (26)	Tennessee (28) (1-0)	Tennessee (30) (3-0)	Tennessee (29) (5-0)	Tennessee (30) (6-0)	Tennessee (29) (7-0)	Tennessee (24) (9-0)	Connecticut (24) (9–0)	Connecticut (25) (11–0)	Connecticut (25) (13–0)	Connecticut (25) (15–0)	Connecticut (25) (18–0)	Connecticut (25) (19–0)	Connecticut (25) (21–0)	Tennessee (21) (22–1)	Connecticut (22) (24–1)	Connecticut (24) (27–1)	Connecticut (24) (29–1)	Connecticut (30) (31–1)	Connecticut (24) (32–1)	Tennessee (36–2) (31)	1.
2.	Connecticut (4)	Connecticut (2) (1-0)	Connecticut (1) (2-0)	Connecticut (2) (5-0)	Connecticut (1) (6-0)	Connecticut (1) (7-0)	Connecticut (1) (8-0)	Stanford (10–1)	Stanford (12–1)	Tennessee (12–1)	Tennessee (14–1)	Tennessee (16–1)	Tennessee (18–1)	Tennessee (20–1)	Connecticut (3) (22–1)	North Carolina (2) (24–2)	North Carolina (1) (26–2)	North Carolina (1) (27–2)	North Carolina (1) (30–2)	North Carolina (1) (30–2)	Stanford (35–4)	2.
3.	Rutgers	Maryland (2-0)	Maryland (5-0)	Maryland (8-0)	Rutgers (5-1)	North Carolina (10-1)	North Carolina (11-1)	Tennessee (1) (10–1)	Tennessee (10–1)	North Carolina (14–1)	North Carolina (16–1)	Maryland (22–1)	North Carolina (18–2)	North Carolina (20–2)	North Carolina (22–2)	Tennessee (23–2)	Tennessee (25–2)	Tennessee (27–2)	Tennessee (30–2)	Tennessee (30–2)	Connecticut (36–2)	3.
4.	Maryland	LSU (1) (2-0)	Stanford (3-0)	North Carolina (7-0)	North Carolina (9-1)	Stanford (7-1)	Stanford (8-1)	North Carolina (12–1)	North Carolina (13–1)	Maryland (18–1)	Maryland (20–1)	North Carolina (17–2)	Rutgers (17–2)	Maryland (24–2)	Rutgers (19–4)	Rutgers (1) (20–4)	Rutgers (22–4)	Maryland (29–2)	Stanford (30–3)	Stanford (30–3)	LSU (31–6)	4.
5.	LSU (1)	Stanford (2-0)	LSU (3-1)	Stanford (5-1)	Stanford (7-1)	Maryland (1) (13-1)	Maryland (13-1)	Maryland (14–1)	Maryland (16–1)	Rutgers (11–2)	Rutgers (13–2)	Rutgers (15–2)	Maryland (22–2)	Baylor (20–1)	Maryland (25–2)	Maryland (27–2)	Maryland (28–2)	Rutgers (24–5)	LSU (27–5)	LSU (27–5)	North Carolina (33–3)	5.
6.	Oklahoma	North Carolina (2-0)	North Carolina (6-0)	Rutgers (3-1)	Maryland (10-1)	Rutgers (6-2)	Rutgers (8-2)	Rutgers (8–2)	Rutgers (9–2)	Oklahoma (9–2)	Stanford (14–3)	Baylor (16–1)	Baylor (18–1)	Stanford (19–3)	Stanford (22–3)	LSU (22–3)	LSU (23–4)	Stanford (27–3)	Maryland (30–3)	Maryland (30–3)	Rutgers (27–7)	6.
7.	North Carolina	Rutgers (0-1)	Rutgers (2-1)	LSU (4-2)	LSU (6-2)	Georgia (9-0)	Georgia (10-0)	Georgia (10–0)	Georgia (12–0)	Standford (12–3)	Baylor (14–1)	Stanford (16–3)	Stanford (17–3)	Rutgers (18–3)	LSU (20–3)	Stanford (24–3)	Stanford (25–3)	LSU (25–4)	Rutgers (24–6)	Rutgers (24–6)	Maryland (33–4)	7.
8.	Stanford	Oklahoma (0-1)	Duke (3-0)	Georgie (6-0)	Georgia (8-0)	LSU (6-2)	LSU (7-2)	LSU (9–2)	Oklahoma (9–2)	Baylor (12–1)	LSU (13–3)	California (17–2)	LSU (16–3)	LSU (18–3)	Baylor (21–2)	California (23–3)	Baylor (23–3)	Baylor (24–4)	Baylor (24–5)	Texas A&M (26–7)	Texas A&M (29–8)	8.
9.	Duke	Duke (1-0)	Georgia (4-0)	Oklahoma (2-2)	Oklahoma (4-2)	Oklahoma (6-2)	Oklahoma (7-2)	Oklahoma (8–2)	Baylor (10–1)	California (13–2)	California (15–2)	LSU (14–3)	California (17–3)	California (19–3)	California (21–3)	Baylor (22–3)	California (23–4)	California (24–5)	California (26–6)	California (26–6)	Duke (25–10)	9.
10.	Georgia	Georgia (2-0)	Texas A&M (2-0)	Duke (5-1)	Baylor (6-0)	Baylor (6-0)	Texas A&M (9-1)	Baylor (9–1)	California (11–2)	Georgia (12–1)	Oklahoma (10–3)	Duke (14–4)	Oklahoma (13–4)	Oklahoma (15–4)	Oklahoma (17–4)	Oklahoma (18–5)	Oklahoma (20–5)	Oklahoma (21–6)	Duke (23–9)	Duke (23–9)	Old Dominion (31–5)	10.
11.	Texas A&M	Texas A&M (1-0)	Oklahoma (0-2)	Baylor (5-0)	Texas A&M (6-1)	Texas A&M (8-1)	Baylor (7-1)	California (9–2)	LSU (10–3)	LSU (11–3)	Duke (13–4)	Oklahoma (11–4)	Duke (15–5)	West Virginia (18–3)	West Virginia (19–3)	Duke (19–7)	Old Dominion (24–3)	Duke (21–8)	Oklahoma (21–7)	Baylor (24–6)	Louisville (26–10)	11.
12.	Arizona State	George Washington (2-0)	Baylor (4-0)	Texas A&M (4-1)	California (7-1)	California (8-1)	California (8-2)	Texas A&M (9–2)	Texas A&M (11–2)	Texas A&M (12–2)	Georgia (14–2)	West Virginia (14–3)	West Virginia (16–3)	Duke (16–6)	Duke (18–6)	West Virginia (20–4)	Duke (21–7)	George Washington (24–5)	Texas A&M (23–7)	Old Dominion (29–4)	Oklahoma State (27–8)	12.
13.	George Washington	Baylor (3-0)	Arizona State (2-1)	California (4-1)	West Virginia (7-1)	West Virginia (8-1)	West Virginia (10-1)	DePaul (10–0)	Duke (10–3)	Duke (12–3)	George Washington (13–3)	Oklahoma State (16–1)	George Washington (16–4)	George Washington (18–4)	Old Dominion (20–3)	Old Dominion (22–3)	West Virginia (22–4)	Old Dominion (25–4)	Utah (27–3)	Oklahoma State (25–7)	Notre Dame (25–9)	13.
14.	California	Arizona State (0-1)	California (3-0)	George Washington (5-1)	Auburn (8-0)	Auburn (9-0)	Duke (7-3)	Duke (9–3)	Notre Dame (11–1)	Notre Dame (11–2)	West Virginia (12–3)	Georgia (15–3)	Old Dominion (16–3)	Old Dominion (18–3)	George Washington (19–4)	Notre Dame (20–5)	Notre Dame (21–6)	Utah (25–3)	Old Dominion (26–4)	Oklahoma (21–8)	George Washington (27–7)	14.
15.	Baylor	California (1-0)	George Washington (3-1)	Arizona State (3-2)	Duke (5-3)	Duke (7-3)	DePaul (9-0)	Auburn (11–1)	West Virginia (10–2)	Texas (12–2)	Notre Dame (12–3)	Ohio State (15–3)	Wyoming (18–1)	Pittsburgh (17–4)	Oklahoma State (19–3)	Kansas State (18–6)	Utah (23–3)	Texas A&M (22–7)	Kansas State (21–8)	Kansas State (21–9)	Vanderbilt (25–9)	15.
16.	Ohio State	Ohio State (1-0)	Ohio State (4-0)	West Virginia (5-1)	DePaul (6-0)	DePaul (7-0)	Auburn (10-1)	Notre Dame (10–1)	DePaul (11–1)	West Virginia (11–2)	Texas A&M (12–4)	Notre Dame (15–3)	Georgia (16–4)	Oklahoma State (17–3)	Notre Dame (18–5)	George Washington (20–5)	George Washington (22–5)	Notre Dame (23–7)	George Washington (25–6)	George Washington (25–6)	Baylor (25–7)	16.
17.	Vanderbilt	Vanderbilt (2-0)	West Virginia (3-0)	Ohio State (5-1)	Vanderbilt (7-2)	Ohio State (6-2)T	Ohio State (7-2)	Ohio State (9–2)	Texas (11–2)	George Washington (12–3)	Ohio State (13–3)	Old Dominion (14–3)	Pittsburgh (16–3)	Notre Dame (17–5)	Kansas State (16–6)	Oklahoma State (20–4)	Kansas State (18–8)	Kansas State (20–8)	Oklahoma State (23–6)	Utah (27–4)	Pittsburgh (24–11)	17.
18.	Michigan State	Michigan State (2-0)	Michigan State (2-1)	Vanderbilt (5-1)	Ohio State (6-2)	Notre Dame (8-1)T	Notre Dame (9-1)	West Virginia (10–2)	Auburn (12–2)	Arkansas (15–0)	Auburn (13–4)	Wyoming (16–1)	Ohio State (16–4)	Kansas State (15–6)	Pittsburgh (18–5)	Utah (21–3)	Texas A&M (20–7)	West Virginia (23–6)	West Virginia (24–7)	West Virginia (24–7)	California (27–7)	18.
19.	Florida State	Florida State (2-0)	Vanderbilt (2-1)	Michigan State (5-1)	Arizona State (4-3)	Arizona State (5-3)	Vanderbilt (8-3)	Texas (9–2)	George Washington (10–3)	Ohio State (11–3)	Oklahoma State (14–1)	George Washington (14–4)	Oklahoma State (16–3)	Texas A&M (16–6)	Texas A&M (17–6)	Texas A&M (18–7)	Oklahoma State (21–5)	Oklahoma State (22–6)	Notre Dame (23–8)	Notre Dame (23–8)	Oklahoma (22–9)	19.
20.	Purdue	West Virginia (1-0)	Purdue (2-0)	Auburn (6-0)	Notre Dame (6-1)	Vanderbilt (8-3)	Texas (8-2)	George Washington (9–3)	Arkansas (14–0)	Wyoming (12–1)	Wyoming (14–1)	Texas A&M (13–5)	Notre Dame (15–5)	Ohio State (17–5)	Utah (20–3)	Ohio State (19–6)	Georgia (20–7)	Marist (28–2)	Marist (31–2)T	Vanderbilt (23–8)	West Virginia (25–8)	20.
21.	Pittsburgh	Louisville (1-0)	Florida State (3-1)	DePaul (4-0)	George Washington (6-3)	Michigan State (7-2)	Oklahoma State (8-0)	Vanderbilt (9–3)	Ohio State (9–3)	Auburn (12–3)T	Old Dominion (12–3)	Pittsburgh (14–3)	Kansas State (14–5)	Georgia (16–6)	Wyoming (19–3)	Georgia (19–7)	Marist (26–2)	Georgia (21–8)	Vanderbilt (23–8)T	Louisville (24–9)	Kansas State (22–10)	21.
22.	West Virginia	Texas (1-0)	Texas (2-1)	Florida State (5-1)	Wyoming (6-0)	George Washington (7-3)	Arizona State (6-4)	Wyoming (11–1)	Wyoming (11–1)	Old Dominion (10–3)T	DePaul (12–3)	Auburn (13–5)	Syracuse (16–3)	Utah (18–3)	Syracuse (18–4)	Pittsburgh (18–7)	Ohio State (20–7)	Vanderbilt (22–7)	Louisville (24–8)	Marist (31–2)	Virginia (24–10)	22.
23.	Louisville	Purdue (1-0)	DePaul (3-0)	Notre Dame (4-1)	Michigan State (6-2)	Texas (7-2)	George Washington (7-3)	Arkansas (12–0)	Old Dominion (9–3)	DePaul (11–3)	Texas (12–4)	Georgia Tech (16–3)	Texas A&M (14–6)	Wyoming (18–3)	Ohio State (18–6)	Marist (25–2)	UTEP (23–2)	Ohio State (22–7)	Virginia (23–9)	Virginia (23–9)	Marist (32–3)	23.
24.	Texas	NC State (1-0)	Notre Dame (2-1)	Wyoming (4-0)	NC State (8-1)	Oklahoma State (8-0)	Michigan State (7-3)	Hartford (10–2)	Oklahoma State (12–1)	Oklahoma State (12–1)	Pittsburgh (13–3)	Syracuse (15–3)	DePaul (15–4)	Syracuse (17–4)	Georgia (17–7)	Syracuse (19–5)	Vanderbilt (20–7)	UTEP (25–2)	UTEP (27–3)	Georgia (22–9)	Georgia (23–10)	24.
25.	NC State	Notre Dame (1-0)	Auburn (3-0)	Texas (4-2)	Texas (6-2)	Wyoming (8-1)	Wyoming (10-1)	Texas Tech (11–1)	Texas Tech (12–1)	Arizona State (10–5)	Arizona State (11–5)	DePaul (13–4)	Texas (15–5)	DePaul (16–5)	Marist (23–2)	UTEP (21–2)	Wyoming (22–4)	Virginia (22–8)	Georgia (22–9)	UTEP (27–3)	UTEP (28–4)	25.
	Week 1 Preseason	Week 2 Nov 13	Week 3 Nov 20	Week 4 Nov 27	Week 5 Dec 4	Week 6 Dec 11	Week 7 Dec 18	Week 8 Dec 25	Week 9 Jan 1	Week 10 Jan 8	Week 11 Jan 15	Week 12 Jan 22	Week 13 Jan 29	Week 14 Feb 5	Week 15 Feb 12	Week 16 Feb 19	Week 17 Feb 26	Week 18 Mar 4	Week 19 Mar 11	Week 20 Mar 17	Final Apr 10	
		Dropped: No. 21 Pittsburgh	Dropped: No. 21 Louisville; No. 24 NC State	Dropped: No. 20 Purdue	Dropped: No. 22 Florida State	Dropped: No. 24 NC State	None	Dropped: No. 21 Oklahoma State; No. 22 Arizona State; No. 24 Michigan State	Dropped: No. 21 Vanderbilt; No. 24 Hartford	Dropped: No. 25 Texas Tech	Dropped: No. 18 Arkansas	Dropped: No. 23 Texas; No. 25 Arizona State	Dropped: No. 22 Auburn; No. 23 Georgia Tech	Dropped: No. 25 Texas	Dropped: No. 25 DePaul	Dropped: No. 21 Wyoming	Dropped: No. 22 Pittsburgh; No. 24 Syracuse	Dropped: No. 25 Wyoming	Dropped: No. 23 Ohio State	None	Dropped: No. 17 Utah	
