= 2007–08 LSU Lady Tigers basketball team =

Intercollegiate basketball season

2007–08 LSU Lady Tigers basketball

SEC Regular season champions

NCAA Women's Tournament, Final Four
- Conference: Southeastern Conference

Ranking
- Coaches: No. 4
- AP: No. 6
- Record: 31–6 (14–0 SEC)
- Head coach: Van Chancellor (1st season)
- Assistant coaches: Bob Starkey; Yolanda Wells-Broughton; Travis Mays
- Home arena: Pete Maravich Assembly Center

2007–08 SEC women's basketball standings
	Conf.				Overall
Team	W		L	PCT	W		L	PCT
No. 6 LSU	14	–	0	1.000	31	–	6	.838
No. 3 Tennessee ^{†}	13	–	1	.929	36	–	2	.947
No. 21 Vanderbilt	11	–	3	.786	25	–	9	.735
Kentucky	8	–	6	.571	17	–	16	.515
Georgia	8	–	6	.571	23	–	10	.697
Auburn	7	–	7	.500	20	–	12	.625
Florida	6	–	8	.429	19	–	14	.576
Ole Miss	6	–	8	.429	13	–	16	.448
Mississippi State	4	–	10	.286	16	–	15	.516
South Carolina	4	–	10	.286	16	–	16	.500
Arkansas	2	–	12	.143	17	–	13	.567
Alabama	1	–	13	.071	8	–	22	.267
† 2008 SEC tournament winner Rankings from AP poll

The 2007–08 LSU Lady Tigers basketball team represented Louisiana State University during the 2007–08 NCAA Division I women's basketball season college basketball season. The Lady Tigers, led by first-year head coach Van Chancellor, played their home games at Pete Maravich Assembly Center and were members of the Southeastern Conference. They finished the season 31–6, 14–0 in SEC play to win the regular season conference title. As the top seed in the SEC women's tournament, they lost in the championship game to Tennessee. They received an at-large bid to the NCAA women's tournament as the No. 2 seed in the New Orleans (NOR) region. The Lady Tigers defeated Jackson State, Marist, Oklahoma State, and No. 1 seed North Carolina to reach the Final Four. LSU was beaten in the National semifinals by conference foe Tennessee.

The senior class, led by Sylvia Fowles, reached the Final Four in each of their seasons at LSU. In 2017, Fowles would be the second player in program history to have her number retired.

== Roster ==
2007–08 LSU Tigers women's basketball team
Players
Coaches

Pos.	#	Name	Height	Year	Previous school	Hometown
G	1	Katherine Graham	5 ft 11 in (1.8 m)	Fr	Ramsay	Birmingham, AL
G	3	Latear Eason	5 ft 8 in (1.73 m)	Fr	John Hope Academy	Chicago, IL
G	5	Erica White	5 ft 3 in (1.6 m)	Sr	Ribault	Jacksonville, FL
G	10	Khaliah Mitchell	5 ft 11 in (1.8 m)	Sr	St. Mary's	New Orleans, LA
G	12	RaShonta LeBlanc	5 ft 7 in (1.7 m)	Sr	Memorial	Port Arthur, TX
G	15	Quianna Chaney	5 ft 11 in (1.8 m)	Sr	Southern Lab	Baton Rouge, LA
G	23	Allison Hightower	5 ft 10 in (1.78 m)	So	Seguin	Dallas, TX
G	24	Marian Whitfield	5 ft 9 in (1.75 m)	Sr	Glenn Hills	Augusta, GA
C	25	Mesha Williams	6 ft 3 in (1.91 m)	Sr	Gateway Tech; Moberly CC	St. Louis, MO
C	34	Sylvia Fowles	6 ft 6 in (1.98 m)	Sr	Miami Edison	Miami, FL
F	44	Kristen Morris	6 ft 2 in (1.88 m)	Jr	Detroit Country Day	Lathrup Village, MI
F	54	Ashley Thomas	6 ft 0 in (1.83 m)	Sr	Stephenson	Stone Mountain, GA

Head coach

- Nikki Fargas (Tennessee)

Assistant coach(es)

- Tasha Butts (Tennessee)
- Mickie DeMoss (Louisiana Tech)
- Charlene Thomas-Swinson (Auburn)

Legend

- (C) Team captain
- (S) Suspended
- (I) Ineligible
- (W) Walk-on
- Injured
- Current redshirt

Roster

== Schedule and results ==
Date time, TV	Rank^{#}	Opponent^{#}	Result	Record	Site (attendance) city, state
Exhibition
Oct 31, 2007*		All-Stars	W 94–35		Maravich Assembly Center; Baton Rouge, LA
Nov 5, 2007*		Houston Jaguars	W 82–51		Maravich Assembly Center; Baton Rouge, LA
Regular season
Nov 9, 2007*; 7:00 p.m.	No. 5	Samford	W 86–38	1–0	Maravich Assembly Center; Baton Rouge, LA
Nov 11, 2007*; 2:00 p.m.	No. 5	TCU	W 73–54	2–0	Maravich Assembly Center; Baton Rouge, LA
Nov 15, 2007*; 7:00 p.m.	No. 4	No. 17 Michigan State	W 64–41	3–0	Maravich Assembly Center; Baton Rouge, LA
Nov 18, 2007*; 1:00 p.m.	No. 4	at No. 3 Maryland	L 62–75	3–1	Comcast Center; College Park, MD
Nov 21, 2007*; 7:00 p.m.	No. 6	Louisiana–Lafayette	W 72–37	4–1	Maravich Assembly Center; Baton Rouge, LA
Nov 25, 2007*; 1:30 p.m.	No. 6	at No. 7 Rutgers	L 43–45	4–2	Louis Brown Athletic Center; Piscataway, NJ
Nov 29, 2007*; 7:00 p.m.	No. 8	at Houston	W 77–46	5–2	Hofheinz Pavilion; Houston, TX
Dec 2, 2007*; 4:00 p.m.	No. 8	at Tulane	W 52–36	6–2	Fogelman Arena; New Orleans, LA
Dec 16, 2007*; 2:00 p.m.	No. 8	at Louisiana Tech	W 76–45	7–2	Thomas Assembly Center; Ruston, LA
Dec 18, 2007*; 1:30 p.m.	No. 8	vs. UIC; Caribbean Classic	W 86–44	8–2	Moon Palace Resort; Cancun, Mexico
Dec 19, 2007*; 1:30 p.m.	No. 8	vs. Miami (FL); Caribbean Classic	W 63–52	9–2	Moon Palace Resort; Cancun, Mexico
Dec 28, 2007*; 7:00 p.m.	No. 8	at Middle Tennessee	L 56–67	9–3	Murphy Center; Murfreesboro, TN
Dec 30, 2007*; 2:00 p.m.	No. 8	New Orleans	W 73–46	10–3	Maravich Assembly Center; Baton Rouge, LA
Jan 3, 2008*; 6:00 p.m.	No. 11	at Florida State	W 73–61	11–3	Donald L. Tucker Center; Tallahassee, FL
Jan 10, 2008; 7:00 p.m.	No. 11	at No. 20 Arkansas	W 76–54	12–3 (1–0)	Bud Walton Arena; Fayetteville, AR
Jan 13, 2008; 4:00 p.m.	No. 11	Vanderbilt	W 62–51	13–3 (2–0)	Maravich Assembly Center; Baton Rouge, LA
Jan 20, 2008; 2:00 p.m.	No. 9	Mississippi State	W 84–31	14–3 (3–0)	Maravich Assembly Center; Baton Rouge, LA
Jan 24, 2008; 6:00 p.m.	No. 9	at No. 25 Auburn	W 79–59	15–3 (4–0)	Beard–Eaves–Memorial Coliseum; Auburn, AL
Jan 27, 2008; 1:00 p.m.	No. 9	at Kentucky	W 72–46	16–3 (5–0)	Rupp Arena; Lexington, KY
Jan 31, 2008; 7:00 p.m.	No. 8	South Carolina	W 67–37	17–3 (6–0)	Maravich Assembly Center; Baton Rouge, LA
Feb 3, 2008; 10:00 a.m.	No. 8	at Florida	W 85–71	18–3 (7–0)	Stephen C. O'Connell Center; Gainesville, FL
Feb 7, 2008; 6:00 p.m.	No. 8	at Alabama	W 89–53	19–3 (8–0)	Coleman Coliseum; Tuscaloosa, AL
Feb 10, 2008; 1:00 p.m.	No. 8	No. 24 Georgia; Pack the PMAC XII	W 63–57	20–3 (9–0)	Maravich Assembly Center; Baton Rouge, LA
Feb 14, 2008; 5:30 p.m.	No. 7	at No. 1 Tennessee	W 78–62	21–3 (10–0)	Thompson–Boling Arena; Knoxville, TN
Feb 17, 2008; 2:00 p.m.	No. 7	Ole Miss	W 78–48	22–3 (11–0)	Maravich Assembly Center; Baton Rouge, LA
Feb 21, 2008; 7:00 p.m.	No. 6	Kentucky	W 52–48	23–3 (12–0)	Maravich Assembly Center; Baton Rouge, LA
Feb 25, 2008*; 6:00 p.m.	No. 6	No. 1 Connecticut	L 69–74	23–4	Maravich Assembly Center; Baton Rouge, LA
Feb 28, 2008; 7:00 p.m.	No. 6	Arkansas	W 83–46	24–4 (13–0)	Maravich Assembly Center; Baton Rouge, LA
Mar 2, 2008; 2:30 p.m.	No. 6	at Mississippi State	W 64–49	25–4 (14–0)	Humphrey Coliseum; Starkville, MS
SEC Women's Tournament
Mar 7, 2008*; 12:00 p.m.	(1) No. 7	vs. (8) Ole Miss; Quarterfinals	W 80–36	26–4	Sommet Center; Nashville, TN
Mar 8, 2008*; 5:30 p.m.	(1) No. 7	vs. (4) Kentucky; Semifinals	W 66–49	27–4	Sommet Center; Nashville, TN
Mar 9, 2008*; 6:30 p.m.	(1) No. 7	vs. (2) No. 3 Tennessee; Championship game	L 55–61	27–5	Sommet Center; Nashville, TN
NCAA Tournament
Mar 22, 2008*; 9:30 p.m.	(2 NOR) No. 6	(15 NOR) Jackson State; First round	W 66–32	28–5	Maravich Assembly Center; Baton Rouge, LA
Mar 24, 2008*; 6:00 p.m.	(2 NOR) No. 6	(7 NOR) No. 22 Marist; Second round	W 68–49	29–5	Maravich Assembly Center; Baton Rouge, LA
Mar 29, 2008*; 1:30 p.m.	(2 NOR) No. 6	vs. (3 NOR) No. 13 Oklahoma State; Regional Semifinal – Sweet Sixteen	W 67–52	30–5	New Orleans Arena; New Orleans, LA
Mar 31, 2008*; 6:30 p.m.	(2 NOR) No. 6	vs. (1 NOR) No. 2 North Carolina; Regional Final – Elite Eight	W 56–50	31–5	New Orleans Arena; New Orleans, LA
Apr 6, 2008*; 8:30 p.m.	(2 NOR) No. 6	vs. (1 OKC) No. 3 Tennessee; National Semifinal – Final Four	L 46–47	31–6	St. Pete Times Forum; St. Petersburg, Florida
*Non-conference game. ^{#}Rankings from AP Poll. (#) Tournament seedings in parentheses. NOR=New Orleans Region. All times are in Central Time.

== Rankings ==
2007–08 NCAA Division I women's basketball rankings
