= 2008 SEC women's basketball tournament =

American women's postseason collegiate basketball tournament

- Classification: Division I
- Teams: 12
- Site: Sommet Center; Nashville, Tennessee
- Champions: Tennessee (13th title)
- Winning coach: Pat Summitt (13th title)
- MVP: Candace Parker (Tennessee)
- Attendance: 51,036

2007–08 SEC women's basketball standings
	Conf.				Overall
Team	W		L	PCT	W		L	PCT
No. 6 LSU	14	–	0	1.000	31	–	6	.838
No. 3 Tennessee ^{†}	13	–	1	.929	36	–	2	.947
No. 21 Vanderbilt	11	–	3	.786	25	–	9	.735
Kentucky	8	–	6	.571	17	–	16	.515
Georgia	8	–	6	.571	23	–	10	.697
Auburn	7	–	7	.500	20	–	12	.625
Florida	6	–	8	.429	19	–	14	.576
Ole Miss	6	–	8	.429	13	–	16	.448
Mississippi State	4	–	10	.286	16	–	15	.516
South Carolina	4	–	10	.286	16	–	16	.500
Arkansas	2	–	12	.143	17	–	13	.567
Alabama	1	–	13	.071	8	–	22	.267
† 2008 SEC tournament winner Rankings from AP poll

The 2008 SEC women's basketball tournament was held on March 6–9, 2008, in Nashville, Tennessee at the Sommet Center.

Tennessee won the tournament and received the SEC's automatic bid to the 2008 NCAA tournament.

== Tournament ==
First round March 6th
9	Mississippi State	49
8	Ole Miss	54
12	Alabama	62
5	Georgia	71
11	Arkansas	51
6	Auburn	73
10	South Carolina	57
7	Florida	71

Second round March 7th
8	Ole Miss	36
1	LSU	80
5	Georgia	50
4	Kentucky	57
6	Auburn	44
3	Vanderbilt	49
7	Florida	61
2	Tennessee	92

Semi-Finals; March 8th
1	LSU	66
4	Kentucky	49
3	Vanderbilt	48
2	Tennessee	63

Finals; March 9th
1	LSU	55
2	Tennessee	61

Asterisk denotes game ended in overtime.

== All-Tournament team ==
- Sylvia Fowles, C, LSU
- Quianna Chaney, G, LSU
- DeWanna Bonner, G, Auburn
- Shannon Bobbitt, G, Tennessee
- Candace Parker, F, Tennessee (MVP)
