= 2007–08 Louisiana–Lafayette Ragin' Cajuns women's basketball team =

Intercollegiate basketball season

2007–08 Louisiana–Lafayette Ragin' Cajuns women's basketball

Sun Belt Tournament, First Round (L, South Alabama 40-49)
- Conference: Sun Belt Conference
- West Division
- Record: 8–22 (4–14 Sun Belt)
- Head coach: Errol Rogers (1st season)
- Assistant coaches: Paula Lee; Liza Whittington
- Home arena: Earl K. Long Gymnasium

2007–08 Sun Belt Conference women's basketball standings
	Conf.				Overall
Team	W		L	PCT	W		L	PCT
East Division
Western Kentucky†	16	–	2	.889	26	–	8	.765
Middle Tennessee	14	–	4	.778	22	–	12	.647
South Alabama	10	–	8	.556	20	–	11	.645
FIU	8	–	10	.444	13	–	18	.419
Troy	5	–	13	.278	13	–	18	.419
Florida Atlantic	2	–	16	.111	6	–	22	.214
West Division
Arkansas–Little Rock	14	–	4	.778	23	–	9	.719
Arkansas State	13	–	5	.722	20	–	12	.625
Louisiana–Monroe	10	–	8	.556	17	–	13	.567
North Texas	8	–	10	.444	14	–	18	.438
New Orleans	7	–	11	.389	13	–	17	.433
Denver	6	–	12	.333	11	–	19	.367
Louisiana–Lafayette	4	–	14	.222	8	–	22	.267
† Tournament winner Rankings from Coaches

The 2007–08 Louisiana–Lafayette Ragin' Cajuns women's basketball team represented the University of Louisiana at Lafayette during the 2007–08 NCAA Division I women's basketball season. The Ragin' Cajuns were led by first-year head coach Errol Rogers; they played their double-header home games at the Cajundome with other games at the Earl K. Long Gymnasium, which is located on campus. They were members in the Sun Belt Conference. They finished the season 8–22, 4–14 in Sun Belt play to finish dead-last (seventh place) in the West Division. They were eliminated in the first round of the Sun Belt women's tournament.

== Previous season ==
The Ragin' Cajuns finished the 2006–07 season 26–9, –14 in Sun Belt play to finish in as Sun Belt West Divisional Champions. They were invited to the oost-season conference tournament, where they made it to the championship before losing by 10 points to the Middle Tennessee Blue Raiders women's basketball. They would go on to be invited to the 2007 NCAA Division I women's basketball tournament where they would lose to Marquette by the score of 58–87. This was the only time a Ragin' Cajuns women's basketball team has made it to March Madness. This would also be J. Kelly Hall's last season at the helm of the program, as he was hired by the Cincinnati Bearcats following the season. Hall's tenure was arguably the most successful in Cajuns' history, including two divisional titles, the winningest season in program history, as well as winning seasons in each of his years.

== Roster ==
2007–08 Louisiana–Lafayette Ragin' Cajuns women's basketball team
Players
Coaches

Pos.	#	Name	Height	Year	Previous school	Hometown
PG	00	Bronson Rogers	5 ft 5 in (1.65 m)	So	Itawamba CC	N/A
PG	1	Blair Brodhead	5 ft 7 in (1.7 m)	RS Fr	Teurlings Catholic HS	Lafayette, LA
SG	2	Jasmine Barnes	5 ft 7 in (1.7 m)	RS Fr	Broadmoor HS	Baton Rouge, LA
SG	3	Shondalynn Wilson	5 ft 7 in (1.7 m)	So	Jennings HS	Jennings, LA
SG	5	Whitney Dunlap	5 ft 8 in (1.73 m)	RS Jr	Bishop Sullivan HS	Baton Rouge, LA
PG	10	Elaine McCants	5 ft 6 in (1.68 m)	Sr	Brookline HS	Brookline, MA
SG	15	Onna Charles	5 ft 8 in (1.73 m)	Sr	New Iberia HS	New Iberia, LA
C	20	Sonora Edwards	6 ft 2 in (1.88 m)	Sr	Somerville HS	Somerville, NJ
SG	21	Alicia McDaniel	5 ft 7 in (1.7 m)	Sr	James Madison HS	Dallas, TX
PF	22	Courtney Ratliff	5 ft 10 in (1.78 m)	Sr	Canton HS	Canton, MS
C	23	Valanette Amie	6 ft 2 in (1.88 m)	RS Fr	Central HS	Central, LA
SG	25	D'Mya Clay	5 ft 8 in (1.73 m)	RS Fr	Columbus East HS	Columbus, IN
PF	33	Lyndra Bell	5 ft 10 in (1.78 m)	RS Fr	Teurlings Catholic HS	Lafayette, LA
C	34	Ovigwerade Agbuke	6 ft 5 in (1.96 m)	So	Cornerstone Christian	San Antonio, TX
C	50	Kina Miller	6 ft 2 in (1.88 m)	Sr	Cloud County CC	Aurora, IL

Head coach

- Errol Rogers (Louisiana)

Assistant coach(es)

- Paula Lee (LSU)
- Liza Whittington (Lambuth)

Legend

- (C) Team captain
- (S) Suspended
- (I) Ineligible
- (W) Walk-on
- Injured
- Current redshirt

Roster
Last update: 1 December 2020

== Schedule and results ==
Date time, TV	Rank^{#}	Opponent^{#}	Result	Record	Site city, state
Non–conference regular season
11/11/2007*; 1:00 p.m.		at Mercer	L 61–72	0–1	University Center; Macon, GA
11/14/2007*; 4:30 p.m.		Arkansas–Monticello	W 71–58	1–1	Cajundome; Lafayette, LA
11/18/2007*; 2:00 p.m.		at Ole Miss	L 60–86	1–2	Tad Smith Coliseum; Oxford, MS
11/21/2007*; 7:00 p.m.		at No. 6 LSU	L 37–72	1–3	Pete Maravich Assembly Center; Baton Rouge, LA
11/28/2007*; 7:00 p.m.		Tulane	L 61–89	1–4	Earl K. Long Gymnasium; Lafayette, LA
12/01/2007*; 3:00 p.m.		at Centenary	W 78–71	2–4	Gold Dome; Shreveport, LA
12/09/2007*; 2:00 p.m.		LSU Shreveport	W 63–40	3–4	Earl K. Long Gymnasium; Lafayette, LA
12/16/2007*; 5:00 p.m.		at No. 20 Texas	L 43–76	3–5	Frank Erwin Center; Austin, TX
12/18/2007*; 7:00 p.m.		Nicholls State	W 74–47	4–5	Earl K. Long Gymnasium; Lafayette, LA
Sun Belt regular season
12/22/2007; 3:00 p.m.		Louisiana–Monroe	L 59–72	4–6 (0–1)	Fant–Ewing Coliseum; Monroe, LA
Non–conference regular season
12/28/2007*; 2:00 p.m.		at Savannah State	L 62–71	4–7	Tiger Arena; Savannah, GA
12/30/2007*; 3:30 p.m.		at Mississippi State	L 55–80	4–8	Humphrey Coliseum; Starkville, MS
Sun Belt regular season
01/03/2008; 4:30 p.m.		Arkansas State	L 65–71	4–9 (0–2)	Cajundome; Lafayette, LA
01/05/2008*; 4:30 p.m.		New Orleans	W 64–55	5–9 (1–2)	Cajundome; Lafayette, LA
01/10/2008; 5:15 p.m.		at Arkansas–Little Rock	L 51–83	5–10 (1–3)	Jack Stephens Center; Little Rock, AR
01/12/2008; 5:00 p.m.		at North Texas	L 58–77	5–11 (1–4)	UNT Coliseum; Denton, TX
01/20/2008; 3:00 p.m.		Western Kentucky	L 74–90	5–12 (1–5)	Earl K. Long Gymnasium; Lafayette, LA
01/23/2008; 7:00 p.m.		at South Alabama	L 65–76	5–13 (1–6)	Mitchell Center; Mobile, AL
01/27/2008; 3:00 p.m.		at Troy	L 54–63	5–14 (1–7)	Sartain Hall; Mobile, AL
01/30/2008; 7:00 p.m.		Middle Tennessee	L 66–85	5–15 (1–8)	Earl K. Long Gymnasium; Lafayette, LA
02/02/2008; 3:00 p.m.		Florida Atlantic	L 62–65	5–16 (1–9)	Earl K. Long Gymnasium; Lafayette, LA
02/06/2008; 4:15 p.m.		at FIU	L 60–75	5–17 (1–10)	Pharmed Arena; Miami, FL
02/10/2008; 4:00 p.m.		at Denver	L 52–60	5–18 (1–11)	Magness Arena; Denver, CO
02/13/2008; 7:00 p.m.		Louisiana–Monroe	L 59–65	5–19 (1–12)	Earl K. Long Gymnasium; Lafayette, LA
02/17/2008; 2:00 p.m.		at Arkansas State	L 60–79	5–20 (1–13)	Convocation Center; Jonesboro, AR
02/21/2008; 7:00 p.m.		at New Orleans	W 58–56	6–20 (2–13)	Human Performance Center; New Orleans, LA
02/24/2008; 2:00 p.m.		Arkansas–Little Rock	L 42–48	6–21 (2–14)	Earl K. Long Gymnasium; Lafayette, LA
02/27/2008; 7:00 p.m.		North Texas	W 68–63	7–21 (3–14)	Earl K. Long Gymnasium; Lafayette, LA
03/01/2008; 4:30 p.m.		Denver	W 66–44	8–21 (4–14)	Cajundome; Lafayette, LA
Sun Belt Women's Tournament
03/05/2008; 7:00 p.m.		vs. South Alabama; First Round/Quarterfinals	L 40–49	8–22	Mitchell Center; Mobile, AL
*Non-conference game. ^{#}Rankings from AP Poll. (#) Tournament seedings in parentheses. All times are in Central Time.

== See also ==
- 2007–08 Louisiana–Lafayette Ragin' Cajuns men's basketball team
