= 2007–08 Tulane Green Wave women's basketball team =

Intercollegiate basketball season

2007–08 Tulane Green Wave women's basketball
- Conference: Conference USA
- Head coach: Lisa Stockton
- Assistant coaches: Shanna Cook; Alan Frey; Michele Savage
- Home arena: Fogelman Arena

The 2007–08 Tulane Green Wave women's basketball team represented Tulane University in the 2007–08 NCAA Division I women's basketball season. The Green Wave were coached by Lisa Stockton. The Green Wave are a member of Conference USA and attempted to win the Conference USA Tournament.

== Exhibition ==
Date	Location	Opponent	Green Wave points	Opp. points	Record
Nov. 1/07	Fogelman Arena	Houston Jaguars	88	71	1-0

== Regular season ==
- The Green Wave participated in the Caribbean Challenge in Cancun, Mexico from November 21 to 22.
- The Green Wave participated in the DoubleTree Classic from December 20 to 21.

=== Schedule ===
Date	Location	Opponent	Green Wave points	Opp. points	Record
Nov. 10/07	Tuscaloosa, AL	Alabama	64	56	1-0
Nov. 13/07	Fogelman Arena	Georgia Tech	61	66	1-1
Nov. 16/07	Nacogdoches, TX	Stephen F. Austin	56	45	2-1
Nov. 18/07	Fogelman Arena	Winthrop	63	52	3-1
Nov. 21/07	Cancun	Kansas State	60	57	4-1
Nov. 22/07	Cancun	Northern Illinois	70	57	5-1
Nov. 28/07	Lafayette, LA	Louisiana–Lafayette	89	61	6-1
Dec. 2/07	Fogelman Arena	LSU	36	52	6-2
Dec. 5/07	Kingston, RI	Rhode Island	74	65	7-2
Dec. 20/07	Fogelman Arena	Robert Morris	71	82	7-3
Dec. 21/07	Fogelman Arena	Texas-San Antonio	76	42	8-3
Dec. 29/07	Fogelman Arena	Louisiana-Monroe	77	72	9-3
Jan.2/08	New Orleans Arena	Nicholls State	69	47	10-3
Jan. 4/08	Houston, TX	Rice	61	38	11-3
Jan. 6/08	Houston, TX	Houston	64	74	11-4
Jan. 12/08	Fogelman Arena	UTEP	66	81	11-5
Jan. 18/08	Fogelman Arena	Memphis	66	74	11-6
Jan. 20/08	Fogelman Arena	UAB	56	67	11-7
Jan. 26/08	El Paso, TX	UTEP	44	60	11-8
Jan. 31/08	Tulsa, OK	Tulsa	56	64	11-9
Feb. 2/08	Dallas, TX	Southern Methodist	69	81	11-10
Feb. 7/08	Greenville, NC	East Carolina	70	65	12-10
Feb. 10/08	Fogelman Arena	Marshall	61	56	13-10
Feb. 14/08	Fogelman Arena	Rice	73	78	13-11
Feb. 16/08	Fogelman Arena	Houston	73	69	14-11
Feb. 22/08	Orlando, FL	UCF	71	77	14-12
Feb. 24/08	Hattiesburg, MS	Southern Miss	57	72	14-13
Feb. 28/08	Fogelman Arena	Tulsa	80	60	15-13
March 1/08	Fogelman Arena	Southern Methodist	71	68	16-13

== Player stats ==
Player	Games played	Minutes	Field goals	Three pointers	Free throws	Rebounds	Assists	Blocks	Steals	Points

== Postseason ==
=== Conference USA Tournament ===
- Marshall 65, Tulane 58

== Awards and honors ==
- Ashley Langford, Doubletree Classic All-Tournament Team

== Team players drafted into the WNBA ==
- No one from the Green Wave was selected in the 2008 WNBA Draft.

== See also ==
- Tulane Green Wave
