= 2007–08 Tennessee Lady Volunteers basketball team =

Intercollegiate basketball season

2007–08 Tennessee Lady Volunteers basketball

NCAA tournament National Champions SEC tournament champions
- Conference: Southeastern Conference

Ranking
- Coaches: No. 1
- AP: No. 3
- Record: 36–2 (13–1 SEC)
- Head coach: Pat Summitt
- Assistant coaches: Nikki Fargas; Holly Warlick
- Home arena: Thompson-Boling Arena

2007–08 SEC women's basketball standings
	Conf.				Overall
Team	W		L	PCT	W		L	PCT
No. 6 LSU	14	–	0	1.000	31	–	6	.838
No. 3 Tennessee ^{†}	13	–	1	.929	36	–	2	.947
No. 21 Vanderbilt	11	–	3	.786	25	–	9	.735
Kentucky	8	–	6	.571	17	–	16	.515
Georgia	8	–	6	.571	23	–	10	.697
Auburn	7	–	7	.500	20	–	12	.625
Florida	6	–	8	.429	19	–	14	.576
Ole Miss	6	–	8	.429	13	–	16	.448
Mississippi State	4	–	10	.286	16	–	15	.516
South Carolina	4	–	10	.286	16	–	16	.500
Arkansas	2	–	12	.143	17	–	13	.567
Alabama	1	–	13	.071	8	–	22	.267
† 2008 SEC tournament winner Rankings from AP poll

The 2007–08 Tennessee Lady Volunteers basketball team represented the University of Tennessee. The head coach was Pat Summitt. The team played its home games in the Thompson-Boling Arena and was a member of the Southeast Conference. The Lady Vols won their second straight, and record eighth national championship

== Roster ==
2007–08 Tennessee Lady Volunteers women's basketball team
Players
Coaches

Pos.	#	Name	Height	Year	Previous school	Hometown
G	00	Shannon Bobbitt	5 ft 2 in (1.57 m)	Sr	Murry Bergtraum	Bronx, NY
G	2	Cait McMahan	5 ft 4 in (1.63 m)	So		Maryville, TN
F	3	Candace Parker	6 ft 4 in (1.93 m)	Jr	Naperville Central	Naperville, IL
G/F	5	Angie Bjorklund	6 ft 0 in (1.83 m)	Fr	University	Spokane Valley, WA
G	14	Alexis Hornbuckle	5 ft 11 in (1.8 m)	Sr	South Charleston	Charleston, WV
G	20	Sydney Smallbone	5 ft 10 in (1.78 m)	Fr		Granger, IN
F/C	21	Vicki Baugh	6 ft 4 in (1.93 m)	Fr	Sacramento	Sacramento, CA
G/F	33	Alberta Auguste	5 ft 11 in (1.8 m)	Sr		Marrero, LA
F/C	44	Alex Fuller	6 ft 3 in (1.91 m)	Jr	Shelbyville Central	Shelbyville, TN
C	52	Kelley Cain	6 ft 6 in (1.98 m)	Fr	St. Pius X	Atlanta, GA
F/C	55	Nicky Anosike	6 ft 4 in (1.93 m)	Sr	St. Peter's	Brooklyn, NY

Head coach

- Pat Summitt

Assistant coach(es)

- Nikki Fargas
- Holly Warlick

Legend

- (C) Team captain
- (S) Suspended
- (I) Ineligible
- (W) Walk-on
- Injured
- Current redshirt

Roster

== Schedule ==
Date time, TV	Rank^{#}	Opponent^{#}	Result	Record	Site (attendance) city, state
Non-conference regular season
Nov 11, 2007*	No. 1	Chattanooga	W 76–56	1–0	Thompson–Boling Arena; Knoxville, Tennessee
Nov 15, 2007*	No. 1	vs. No. 9 Oklahoma	W 70–67	2–0	Tampa, Florida
Nov 18, 2007*	No. 1	No. 21 Texas	W 92–67	3–0	Thompson–Boling Arena; Knoxville, Tennessee
Nov 21, 2007*	No. 1	at No. 16 West Virginia	W 67–49	4–0	WVU Coliseum; Charleston, West Virginia
Nov 26, 2007*	No. 1	Louisiana Tech	W 81–60	5–0	Thompson–Boling Arena; Knoxville, Tennessee
Dec 2, 2007*; 7:00 p.m., ESPN2	No. 1	No. 4 North Carolina	W 83–79	6–0	Thompson–Boling Arena; Knoxville, Tennessee
Dec 5, 2007*	No. 1	No. 24 Old Dominion	W 83–51	7–0	Thompson–Boling Arena; Knoxville, Tennessee
Dec 13, 2007*	No. 1	Middle Tennessee	W 84–61	8–0	Thompson–Boling Arena; Knoxville, Tennessee
Dec 16, 2007*	No. 1	Gonzaga	W 96–73	9–0	Thompson–Boling Arena; Knoxville, Tennessee
Dec 19, 2007*	No. 1	at UCLA	W 82–70	10–0	Pauley Pavilion; Los Angeles, California
Dec 22, 2007*	No. 1	at No. 5 Stanford	L 69–73 ^{OT}	10–1	Maples Pavilion; Stanford, California
Jan 2, 2008*	No. 3	at No. 15 DePaul	W 102–68	11–1	Sullivan Athletic Center; Chicago, IL
Jan 5, 2008*	No. 3	at No. 14 Notre Dame	W 87–63	12–1	Joyce Center; South Bend, Indiana
SEC regular season
Jan 10, 2008	No. 2	No. 22 Auburn	W 85–52	13–1 (1–0)	Thompson–Boling Arena; Knoxville, Tennessee
Jan 13, 2008	No. 2	at South Carolina	W 71–48	14–1 (2–0)	Colonial Center; Columbia, South Carolina
Jan 17, 2008	No. 2	at Kentucky	W 65–40	15–1 (3–0)	Rupp Arena; Lexington, Kentucky
Jan 20, 2008	No. 2	Vanderbilt	W 79–63	16–1 (4–0)	Thompson–Boling Arena; Knoxville, Tennessee
Jan 24, 2008	No. 2	Arkansas	W 98–55	17–1 (5–0)	Thompson–Boling Arena; Knoxville, Tennessee
Jan 28, 2008*	No. 2	at No. 9 Duke	W 67–64	18–1	Cameron Indoor Stadium; Durham, NC
Jan 31, 2008	No. 2	at Ole Miss	W 68–44	19–1 (6–0)	Tad Smith Coliseum; Oxford, Mississippi
Feb 3, 2008	No. 2	Kentucky	W 79–51	20–1 (7–0)	Thompson–Boling Arena; Knoxville, Tennessee
Feb 7, 2008	No. 2	at Mississippi State	W 87–69	21–1 (8–0)	Humphrey Coliseum; Starkville, Mississippi
Feb 11, 2008*	No. 1	No. 5 Rutgers	W 59–58	22–1	Thompson–Boling Arena; Knoxville, Tennessee
Feb 14, 2008; 6:30 p.m.	No. 1	No. 7 LSU	L 62–78	22–2 (8–1)	Thompson–Boling Arena; Knoxville, Tennessee
Feb 17, 2008	No. 1	at No. 25 Vanderbilt	W 81–68	23–2 (9–1)	Memorial Gymnasium; Nashville, TN
Feb 21, 2008	No. 3	at Alabama	W 85–58	24–2 (10–1)	Coleman Coliseum; Tuscaloosa, Alabama
Feb 24, 2008	No. 3	Mississippi State	W 72–46	25–2 (11–1)	Thompson–Boling Arena; Knoxville, Tennessee
Feb 28, 2008	No. 3	Florida	W 88–61	26–2 (12–1)	Thompson–Boling Arena; Knoxville, Tennessee
Mar 2, 2008	No. 3	at No. 23 Georgia	W 72–63	27–2 (13–1)	Stegeman Coliseum; Athens, Georgia
SEC tournament
Mar 7, 2008*	(2) No. 3	vs. (7) Florida; Quarterfinals	W 92–61	28–2	Sommet Center; Nashville, Tennessee
Mar 8, 2008*	(2) No. 3	(3) No. 21 Vanderbilt; Semifinals	W 63–48	29–2	Sommet Center; Nashville, Tennessee
Mar 9, 2008*; 7:30 p.m.	(2) No. 3	at (1) No. 7 LSU; Championship game	W 61–55	30–2	Sommet Center; Nashville, Tennessee
NCAA tournament
Mar 23, 2008*	(1 OKC) No. 3	vs. (16 OKC) Oral Roberts; First round	W 94–55	31–2	Mackey Arena; West Lafayette, Indiana
Mar 25, 2008*	(1 OKC) No. 3	at (9 OKC) Purdue; Second round	W 78–52	32–2	Mackey Arena; West Lafayette, Indiana
Mar 30, 2008*	(1 OKC) No. 3	vs. (5 OKC) No. 15 Notre Dame; Regional Semifinal – Sweet Sixteen	W 74–64	33–2	Ford Center; Oklahoma City, Oklahoma
Apr 1, 2008*	(1 OKC) No. 3	vs. (2 OKC) Texas A&M; Regional Final – Elite Eight	W 53–45	34–2	Ford Center; Oklahoma City, Oklahoma
Apr 6, 2008*; 9:30 p.m.	(1 OKC) No. 3	vs. (2 NOR) No. 6 LSU; National Semifinal – Final Four	W 47–46	35–2	St. Pete Times Forum; St. Petersburg, Florida
Apr 8, 2008*	(1 OKC) No. 3	vs. (2 SPO) No. 4 Stanford; National Championship	W 64–48	36–2	St. Pete Times Forum; St. Petersburg, Florida
*Non-conference game. ^{#}Rankings from AP Poll. (#) Tournament seedings in parentheses. OKC=Oklahoma City. All times are in Eastern Time.

=== SEC Women’s Basketball tournament ===
- Tennessee (2) 92, Florida (7) 61
- Tennessee 63, Vanderbilt (3) 48
- Tennessee 61, LSU (1) 55

=== NCAA basketball tournament ===
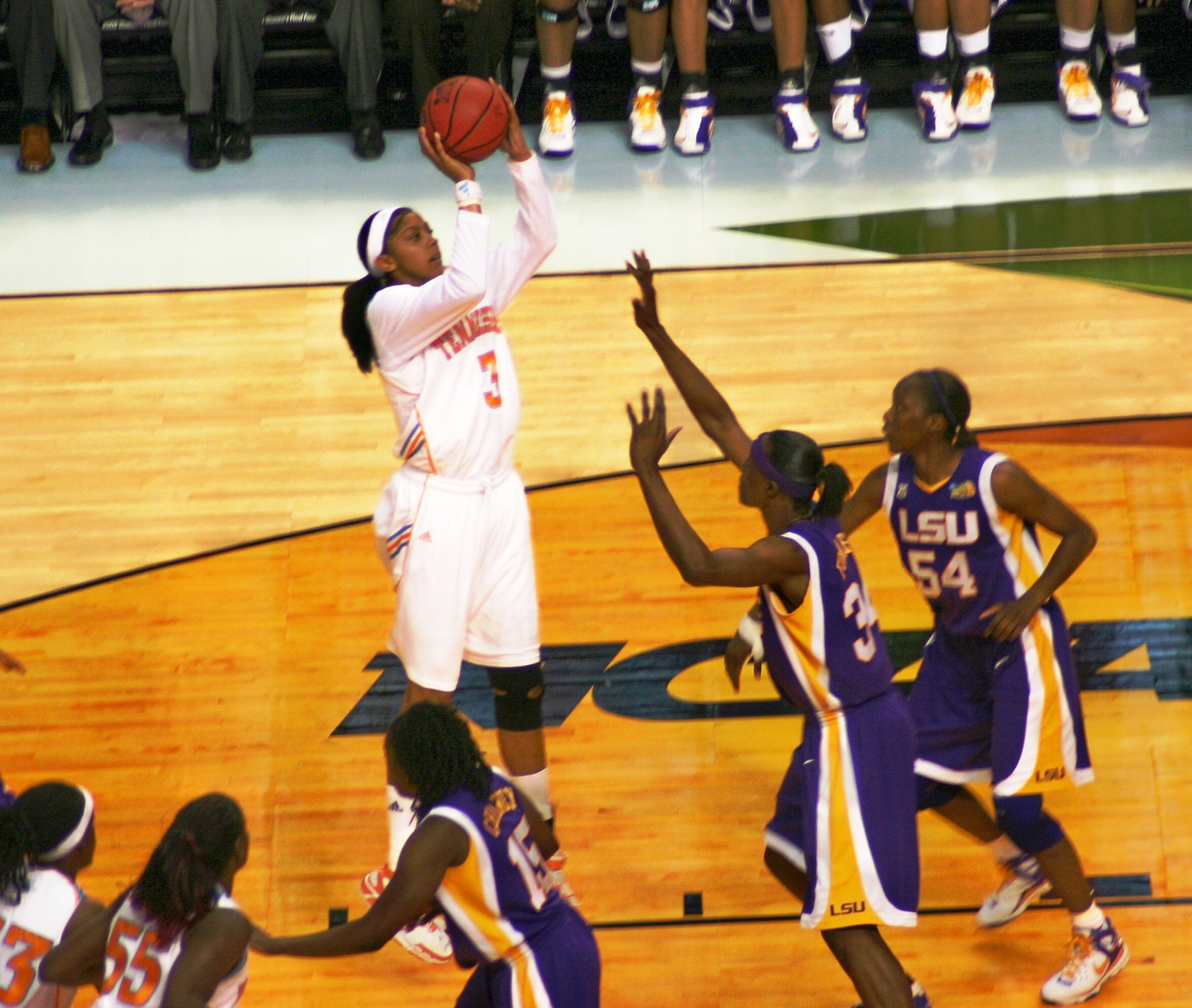
Tournament Most Outstanding Player Tennessee forward Candace Parker shoots over Louisiana State center Sylvia Fowles in the national semifinals.

Seeding in brackets

- Oklahoma City Regional
  - Tennessee (1) 94, Oral Roberts (16) 55
  - Tennessee 78, Purdue (9) 52
  - Tennessee 74, Notre Dame (5) 64
  - Tennessee 53, Texas A&M (2) 45
- Final Four
  - Tennessee 47, LSU 46
  - Tennessee 64, Stanford 48

== Awards and honors ==
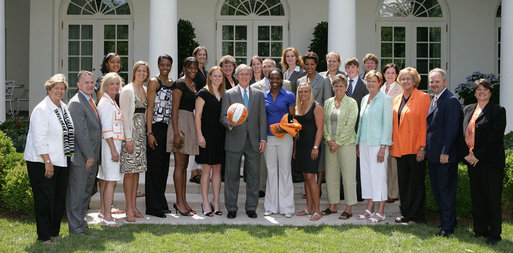
The players, coaches, and other staff of the 2007–2008 Lady Volunteers, winners of the 2008 national championship, are honored at the White House by President George W. Bush on June 24, 2008.

- Shannon Bobbitt, SEC All-Tournament Team
- Candace Parker, Honda Broderick Cup
- Candace Parker, Naismith Award
- Candace Parker, Tournament Most Outstanding Player
- Shannon Bobbitt, SEC All-Tournament Team
- Shannon Bobbitt, SEC Tournament Most Valuable Player
- Candace Parker, Wooden Award
- Pat Summitt, Legends of Coaching Award (adopted by the John R. Wooden Award Committee)

== Team players drafted into the WNBA ==
Candace Parker

Round	Pick	Player	WNBA club
1	1	Candace Parker	Los Angeles Sparks
1	4	Alexis Hornbuckle	Detroit Shock
2	15	Shannon Bobbitt	Los Angeles Sparks
2	16	Nicky Anosike	Minnesota Lynx
3	35	Alberta Auguste	New York Liberty

== See also ==
- Tennessee Lady Volunteers basketball
- Pat Summitt
- 2008 NCAA Division I women's basketball tournament
- 2008 SEC women's basketball tournament
