= 2007–08 Connecticut Huskies women's basketball team =

Intercollegiate basketball season

2007–08 Connecticut Huskies women's basketball

Big East tournament champions Big East regular season champions

NCAA tournament, Final Four
- Conference: Big East Conference

Ranking
- Coaches: No. 3
- AP: No. 1
- Record: 36–2 (15–1 Big East)
- Head coach: Geno Auriemma
- Associate head coach: Chris Dailey
- Assistant coaches: Jamelle Elliott; Shea Ralph
- Home arena: Harry A. Gampel Pavilion

2007–08 Big East Conference women's basketball standings
	Conf.				Overall
Team	W		L	PCT	W		L	PCT
No. 1 Connecticut †	15	–	1	.938	36	–	2	.947
No. 9 Rutgers	14	–	2	.875	27	–	7	.794
No. 17 West Virginia	12	–	4	.750	25	–	8	.758
No. 15 Notre Dame	11	–	5	.688	25	–	9	.735
No. 19 Louisville	10	–	6	.625	26	–	10	.722
Syracuse	10	–	6	.625	22	–	9	.710
Pittsburgh	10	–	6	.625	24	–	11	.686
DePaul	8	–	8	.500	20	–	12	.625
Marquette	8	–	8	.500	21	–	14	.600
St. John's	7	–	9	.438	18	–	15	.545
Georgetown	5	–	11	.313	15	–	14	.517
Villanova	5	–	11	.313	17	–	16	.515
South Florida	5	–	11	.313	16	–	16	.500
Seton Hall	3	–	13	.188	13	–	15	.464
Cincinnati	3	–	13	.188	12	–	16	.429
Providence	2	–	14	.125	12	–	17	.414
† 2008 Big East tournament winner Rankings from AP Poll

The 2007–08 Connecticut Huskies women's basketball team represented the University of Connecticut in the 2007–08 NCAA Division I women's basketball season. Coached by Geno Auriemma, the Huskies played their home games at the Hartford Civic Center in Hartford, Connecticut, and on campus at the Harry A. Gampel Pavilion in Storrs, Connecticut, and were a member of the Big East Conference. They returned to the Final Four, after a three-year absence, and finished the season 36–2 (15–1 Big East).

== Roster ==
2007–08 Connecticut Huskies women's basketball team
Players
Coaches

Pos.	#	Name	Height	Year	Previous school	Hometown
C	31	Tina Charles	6 ft 4 in (1.93 m)	So	Christ the King	Jamaica, N.Y.
G	30	Lorin Dixon	5 ft 4 in (1.63 m)	Fr	Christ the King	Springfield Gardens, N.Y.
G	13	Jacquie Fernandes	5 ft 9 in (1.75 m)	So	Heritage Christian	Pawcatuck, Conn.
F	22	Meghan Gardler	6 ft 0 in (1.83 m)	So	Cardinal O'Hara	Springfield, Pa.
G	32	Kalana Greene	5 ft 10 in (1.78 m)	So	Timberland	Saint Stephen, South Carolina
F/C	51	Cassie Kerns	6 ft 3 in (1.91 m)	Jr	Valparaiso	Valparaiso, Ind.
C	12	Jessica McCormack (redshirt)	6 ft 5 in (1.96 m)	RS Fr	Northcote College/UW	Auckland, New Zealand
F	41	Kaili McLaren	6 ft 2 in (1.88 m)	So	Our Lady of Good Counsel	Washington, D.C.
G	20	Renee Montgomery	5 ft 7 in (1.7 m)	Jr	South Charleston	St. Albans, West Virginia
F	23	Maya Moore	6 ft 0 in (1.83 m)	Fr	Collins Hill	Lawrenceville, Georgia
G	2	Tahirah Williams	6 ft 0 in (1.83 m)	Jr	Immaculate Heart Academy	Montclair, New Jersey

Head coach

Geno Auriemma

Assistant coach(es)

Chris Dailey
Jamelle Elliott
Shea Ralph

Legend

- (C) Team captain
- (S) Suspended
- (I) Ineligible
- (W) Walk-on
- Injured
- Current redshirt

Roster

== Schedule ==
Date time, TV	Rank^{#}	Opponent^{#}	Result	Record	Site (attendance) city, state
Regular season
Nov 11, 2007*	No. 2	Stony Brook	W 98–35	1–0	Harry A. Gampel Pavilion; Storrs, Connecticut
Nov 14, 2007*	No. 2	Holy Cross	W 91–36	2–0	Harry A. Gampel Pavilion; Storrs, Connecticut
Nov 22, 2007*	No. 2	vs. No. 4 Stanford; Paradise Jam	W 66–54	3–0	Saint Thomas, U.S. Virgin Islands
Nov 23, 2007*	No. 2	vs. Old Dominion; Paradise Jam	W 86–43	4–0	Saint Thomas, U.S. Virgin Islands
Nov 25, 2007*	No. 2	vs. No. 11 Duke; Paradise Jam	W 74–48	5–0	Saint Thomas, U.S. Virgin Islands
Nov 29, 2007*	No. 2	BYU	W 80–34	6–0	Harry A. Gampel Pavilion; Storrs, Connecticut
Dec 5, 2007*	No. 2	Virginia	W 75–45	7–0	Harry A. Gampel Pavilion; Storrs, Connecticut
Dec 17, 2007*	No. 2	South Carolina	W 97–39	8–0	Harry A. Gampel Pavilion; Storrs, Connecticut
Dec 21, 2007*	No. 2	at San Diego State	W 85–53	9–0	Cox Arena; San Diego, California
Dec 29, 2007*; 7:00 p.m.	No. 1	Hartford	W 70–24	10–0	Harry A. Gampel Pavilion; Storrs, Connecticut
Dec 31, 2007*	No. 1	Army	W 82–33	11–0	Harry A. Gampel Pavilion; Storrs, Connecticut
Jan 3, 2008	No. 1	at Villanova	W 88–38	12–0 (1–0)	The Pavilion; Radnor Township, Pennsylvania
Jan 6, 2008*	No. 1	at Purdue	W 100–50	13–0	Mackey Arena; West Lafayette, Indiana
Jan 9, 2008	No. 1	No. 16 West Virginia	W 84–48	14–0 (2–0)	Harry A. Gampel Pavilion; Storrs, Connecticut
Jan 12, 2008	No. 1	at Louisville	W 92–71	15–0 (3–0)	Freedom Hall; Louisville, Kentucky
Jan 15, 2008	No. 1	at Syracuse	W 65–59	16–0 (4–0)	Carrier Dome; Syracuse, New York
Jan 19, 2008	No. 1	Cincinnati	W 86–49	17–0 (5–0)	Harry A. Gampel Pavilion; Storrs, Connecticut
January 21, 2008*; 7:00 p.m., ESPN2	No. 1	No. 4 North Carolina	W 82–71	18–0	Harry A. Gampel Pavilion; Storrs, Connecticut
Jan 27, 2008	No. 1	at No. 20 Notre Dame	W 81–64	19–0 (6–0)	Joyce Center; South Bend, Indiana
Jan 30, 2008	No. 1	South Florida	W 71–48	20–0 (7–0)	Harry A. Gampel Pavilion; Storrs, Connecticut
Feb 2, 2008	No. 1	Providence	W 80–54	21–0 (8–0)	Harry A. Gampel Pavilion; Storrs, Connecticut
Feb 5, 2008	No. 1	at No. 7 Rutgers	L 71–73	21–1 (8–1)	Louis Brown Athletic Center; Piscataway, New Jersey
Feb 9, 2008	No. 1	at Seton Hall	W 82–36	22–1 (9–1)	Walsh Gymnasium; South Orange, New Jersey
Feb 12, 2008	No. 2	Georgetown	W 80–48	23–1 (10–1)	Harry A. Gampel Pavilion; Storrs, Connecticut
Feb 17, 2008	No. 2	at No. 18 Pittsburgh	W 90–60	24–1 (11–1)	Petersen Events Center; Pittsburgh, Pennsylvania
Feb 20, 2008	No. 1	Marquette	W 95–63	25–1 (12–1)	Harry A. Gampel Pavilion; Storrs, Connecticut
Feb 23, 2008	No. 1	St. John's	W 98–41	26–1 (13–1)	Harry A. Gampel Pavilion; Storrs, Connecticut
Feb 25, 2008*; 7:00 p.m.	No. 1	at No. 6 LSU	W 74–69	27–1	Maravich Assembly Center; Baton Rouge, Louisiana
Mar 1, 2008	No. 1	at DePaul	W 77–76	28–1 (14–1)	Sullivan Athletic Center; Chicago, Illinois
Mar 3, 2008	No. 1	No. 4 Rutgers	W 66–46	29–1 (15–1)	Harry A. Gampel Pavilion; Storrs, Connecticut
Big East tournament
Mar 9, 2008	No. 1	DePaul	W 86–67	30–1	Harry A. Gampel Pavilion; Storrs, Connecticut
Mar 10, 2008	No. 1	Pittsburgh	W 74–47	31–1	Harry A. Gampel Pavilion; Storrs, Connecticut
Mar 11, 2008	No. 1	No. 23 Louisville	W 65–59	32–1	Harry A. Gampel Pavilion; Storrs, Connecticut
NCAA tournament
Mar 23, 2008*; 7:00 p.m., ESPN2	(1 GBO) No. 1	vs. (16 GBO) Cornell; First round	W 87–47	33–1	Total Mortgage Arena; Bridgeport, Connecticut
Mar 25, 2008*; 10:37 p.m.	(1 GBO) No. 1	vs. (8 GBO) Texas; Second round	W 89–55	34–1	Total Mortgage Arena (6,834); Bridgeport, Connecticut
Mar 30, 2008*	(1 GBO) No. 1	vs. (5 GBO) No. 11 Old Dominion; Regional Semifinal – Sweet Sixteen	W 78–63	35–1	Greensboro Coliseum; Greensboro, North Carolina
Apr 1, 2008*	(1 GBO) No. 1	vs. (2 GBO) No. 7 Rutgers; Regional Final – Elite Eight	W 66–56	36–1	Greensboro Coliseum; Greensboro, North Carolina
Apr 6, 2008*	(1 GBO) No. 1	vs. (2 SPO) No. 4 Stanford; National Semifinal – Final Four	L 73–82	36–2	St. Pete Times Forum; St. Petersburg, Florida
*Non-conference game. ^{#}Rankings from AP Poll. (#) Tournament seedings in parentheses. GBO=Greensboro. All times are in Eastern Time.

== See also ==
- 2007–08 Connecticut Huskies men's basketball team
