= 2008 NCAA Division I women's basketball tournament =

American college basketball tournament

- Teams: 64
- Finals site: St. Pete Times Forum, Tampa, Florida
- Champions: Tennessee Volunteers (8th title, 13th title game, 18th Final Four)
- Runner-up: Stanford Cardinal (3rd title game, 7th Final Four)
- Semifinalists: Connecticut Huskies (9th Final Four); LSU Tigers (5th Final Four)
- Winning coach: Pat Summitt (8th title)
- MOP: Candace Parker
- Top scorer: Candice Wiggins (Stanford) (151 points)

The 2008 NCAA Division I women's basketball tournament involved 64 teams playing in a single-elimination tournament to determine the 2007–08 national champion of women's NCAA Division I college basketball. It commenced on March 22, 2008, and concluded when the University of Tennessee Lady Volunteers defeated the Stanford University Cardinal 64–48 on April 8, 2008, at the St. Pete Times Forum in Tampa, Florida.

== Notable events ==
The preliminary rounds largely followed the seeding, with every number one and number two seed advancing to the regional finals. In the Greensboro and Oklahoma City Regionals, the top seeds Connecticut and Tennessee won respectively to head to the Final Four. Connecticut had to beat Big East rival Rutgers to make the advance. Tennessee' Candace Parker was injured in the game against Texas A&M and had to leave twice, and be fitted with a sleeve to stabilize her shoulder. She still scored 26 points in a game which was won by only eight.

In the other two regionals, the two seeds prevailed. In the New Orleans Regional, LSU beat North Carolina to reach the Final Four for the fifth consecutive time, tying a record set by Connecticut between 2000 and 2004. In the Spokane Regional, Stanford beat the top seed Maryland to go to their first Final Four since 1997, but one that would be the first of a five-year string of consecutive Final Four appearances.

Connecticut and Stanford met in one semifinal. They had played each other earlier in the season at the Paradise Jam held in St. Thomas, Virgin Islands in November. The Huskies had won that game 66–54, but the team had been at full strength. Subsequent to that game Mel Thomas and Kalana Greene both starters, had season ending injuries. Connecticut cut a Stanford lead to a single point, 47–46 when Candice Wiggins hit two three-pointers to start a 10–0 run. Wiggins would go on to score 25 points in the game and would be named the Women's Basketball Coaches Association national player of the year. The Cardinal went on to win the game, and advance to the national championship.

The game between SEC foes Tennessee and LSU didn't win style points, and was described by the New York Times as "one of the ugliest games played this or any season". Tennessee led early opening up a ten-point lead at 37–27, but LSU responded with a 10–0 run to tie the game. With seconds left in the game LSU hit two free throws to take a one-point lead. Tennessee inbounded the ball to Candace Parker who passed it inside to Nicky Anosike, but her shot was deflected to Alexis Hornbuckle, who had missed seven of her field goal attempts. With under one second remaining, Hornhuckle caught the deflection and hit the winning basket. The Lady Vols won 47–46, as the two teams combined scores set an NCAA record for the fewest points scored in a semifinal game.

LSU fell to 0–5 in the Women's Final Four. Combined with the 0–6 mark of the men's team, LSU's 0–11 all-time combined Final Four mark was the worst for schools which have made multiple appearances in both the men's and women's Final Fours. LSU's women ended this drought by defeating Virginia Tech in the 2023 national semifinals.

After the drama of a one-point game in the semifinal, the final game was anticlimactic. The Lady Vols pulled out to a 30–19 lead, and the Stanford Cardinal were unable to close the gap. The win gave Tennessee their second consecutive national championship and a career total of 982 wins, the most of any coach in basketball, men's or women's, along with eight national championships for coach Pat Summitt.

== Subregionals ==
2008 NCAA subregionals

Once again, the system was the same as the Division I men's basketball tournament, with the exception that only 64 teams received bids, and there was no play-in game. Automatic bids were secured by 31 conference champions and 33 at-large bids.

The subregionals, which once again used the "pod system", keeping most teams at or close to the home cities, were held from March 22 to March 25 at these locations:

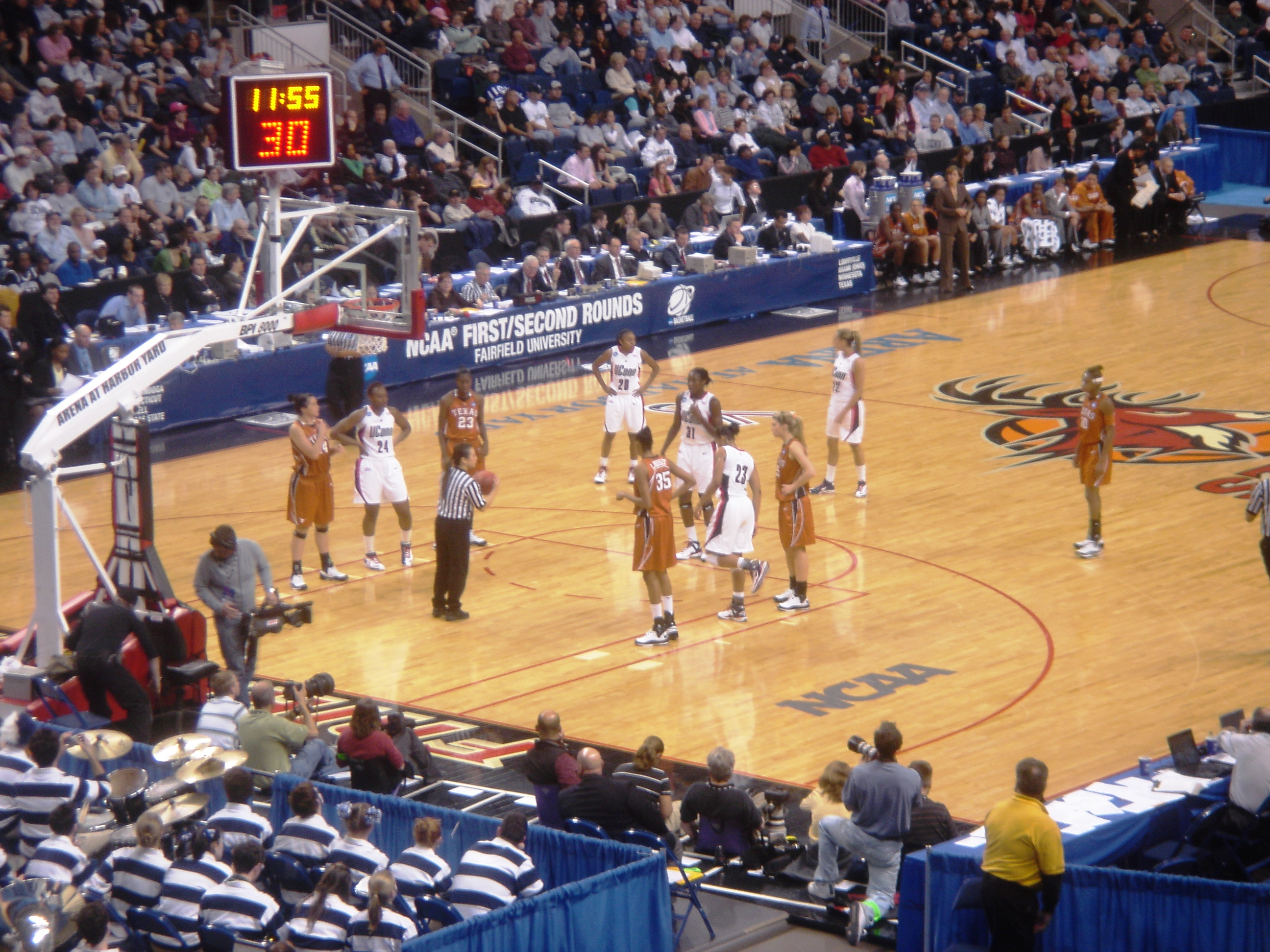
The University of Connecticut Huskies play the University of Texas Longhorns in the second round at Arena at Harbor Yard in Bridgeport, Connecticut.

- March 22 and 24:

The Pit, Albuquerque, New Mexico (Host: University of New Mexico)
Pete Maravich Assembly Center, Baton Rouge, Louisiana (Host: Louisiana State University)
Wells Fargo Arena at the Iowa Events Center, Des Moines, Iowa (Host: Iowa State University)
Maples Pavilion, Stanford, California (Host: Stanford University)

- March 23 and 25:

Arena at Harbor Yard, Bridgeport, Connecticut (Host: Fairfield University)
Comcast Center, College Park, Maryland (Host: University of Maryland, College Park)
Ted Constant Convocation Center, Norfolk, Virginia (Host: Old Dominion University)
Mackey Arena, West Lafayette, Indiana (Host: Purdue University)

This was the fourth and final year that eight sites hosted subregional games. The committee, in September 2007, voted to return to the 16-site format for the early rounds starting with the 2009 tournament.

== Regionals ==
2008 NCAA Regionals and Final Four

The regions (once again named after the host cities, a practice begun in 2005) were held from March 29 to April 1 in the following regions:

- March 29 and 31:

New Orleans Regional, New Orleans Arena, New Orleans (Host: University of New Orleans)
Spokane Regional, Spokane Veterans Memorial Arena, Spokane, Washington (Host: Washington State University)

- March 30 and April 1:

Greensboro Regional, Greensboro Coliseum, Greensboro, North Carolina (Host: Atlantic Coast Conference)
Oklahoma City Regional, Ford Center, Oklahoma City (Host: University of Oklahoma)

The regional winners advanced to the Final Four, held April 6 and 8, 2008, at the St. Pete Times Forum, in Tampa, Florida, hosted by the University of South Florida. USF and the St. Pete Times Forum also hosted a first and second round Men's Tournament subregional on March 21 and 23. Also, akin to the men's tournament, at the regional sites, the NCAA installed floors that were custom made for the first time.

== Tournament records ==
- Rebounds—Sylvia Fowles, LSU, recorded 20 rebounds in the semifinal game against Tennessee, most ever recorded in an NCAA semifinal game.
- Points—Tennessee and LSU combined for 93 points (47–46) setting the record for fewest points scored by both teams combined in a semifinal game.
- Free throws—Tennessee hit two of seven free throw attempts in the national semifinal game against LSU, the lowest free throw percentage (28.6%) recorded in an NCAA Tournament game.
- Final Four appearances—LSU appeared in their fifth consecutive Final Four, tied for the longest such streak, with Connecticut (2000–04)
- Free throws—Kansas State made 21 of 21 free throw attempts, tied with several others for 100% free throw shooting percentage in an NCAA Tournament game, while the 21 completions is the largest number of completions.

== Qualifying teams – automatic ==
Sixty-four teams were selected to participate in the 2008 NCAA Tournament. Thirty-one conferences were eligible for an automatic bid to the 2008 NCAA tournament. Of these thirty-one automatic bids, a total of 30 teams receive automatic bids for winning their conference tournament championship. The Ivy League does not hold a tournament, so its regular season champion receives the automatic bid. Because Cornell, Dartmouth, and Harvard finished in a tie for first place, Ivy League rules called for a two-game stepladder playoff. Dartmouth defeated Harvard in the first game and went on to face Cornell for the automatic bid, which Cornell won 64–47.

Automatic bids
| | | Record | | |
| Qualifying School | Conference | Regular Season | Conference | Seed |
|---|---|---|---|---|
| Bucknell University | Patriot League | 16–15 | 8–6 | 16 |
| University of Tennessee at Chattanooga | Southern Conference | 29–3 | 18–0 | 12 |
| Cleveland State University | Horizon League | 19–13 | 10–8 | 15 |
| University of Connecticut | Big East | 32–1 | 15–1 | 1 |
| Coppin State University | MEAC | 22–11 | 13–3 | 16 |
| Cornell University | Ivy League | 20–8 | 11–3 | 16 |
| East Tennessee State University | Atlantic Sun Conference | 21–11 | 14–2 | 14 |
| California State University, Fresno | WAC | 22–10 | 14–2 | 14 |
| University of Hartford | America East | 27–5 | 14–2 | 10 |
| Illinois State University | Missouri Valley Conference | 26–6 | 13–5 | 13 |
| Jackson State University | SWAC | 18–13 | 13–5 | 15 |
| Liberty University | Big South Conference | 28–3 | 11–1 | 12 |
| Marist College | MAAC | 31–2 | 18–0 | 7 |
| Miami University | MAC | 23–10 | 12–4 | 13 |
| University of Montana | Big Sky Conference | 25–6 | 13–3 | 13 |
| Murray State University | Ohio Valley Conference | 24–7 | 15–5 | 14 |
| University of New Mexico | Mountain West | 20–12 | 9–7 | 12 |
| University of North Carolina | ACC | 30–2 | 14–0 | 1 |
| Old Dominion University | Colonial | 29–4 | 17–1 | 5 |
| Oral Roberts University | Summit League | 19–13 | 10–8 | 16 |
| Purdue University | Big Ten | 18–14 | 11–7 | 9 |
| Robert Morris University | Northeast Conference | 23–9 | 16–2 | 15 |
| University of San Diego | West Coast Conference | 19–12 | 7–7 | 14 |
| Southern Methodist University | Conference USA | 24–8 | 11–5 | 12 |
| Stanford University | Pac-10 | 30–3 | 16–2 | 2 |
| University of Tennessee | SEC | 30–2 | 13–1 | 1 |
| Texas A&M University | Big XII Conference | 26–7 | 11–5 | 2 |
| University of California, Santa Barbara | Big West Conference | 23–7 | 15–1 | 13 |
| University of Texas at San Antonio | Southland | 23–9 | 12–4 | 15 |
| Western Kentucky University | Sun Belt Conference | 26–7 | 16–2 | 10 |
| Xavier University | Atlantic 10 | 24–8 | 11–3 | 9 |

== Qualifying teams – at-large ==
Thirty-three additional teams were selected to complete the sixty-four invitations.

At-large Bids
| | | Record | | |
| Qualifying School | Conference | Regular Season | Conference | Seed |
|---|---|---|---|---|
| Arizona State University | Pacific-10 | 21–10 | 14–4 | 6 |
| Auburn University | Southeastern | 20–11 | 7–7 | 11 |
| Baylor University | Big 12 | 24–6 | 12–4 | 3 |
| University of California, Berkeley | Pacific-10 | 26–6 | 15–3 | 3 |
| DePaul University | Big East | 20–11 | 8–8 | 10 |
| Duke University | Atlantic Coast | 23–9 | 10–4 | 3 |
| Florida State University | Atlantic Coast | 18–13 | 7–7 | 11 |
| The George Washington University | Atlantic 10 | 25–6 | 12–2 | 6 |
| University of Georgia | Southeastern | 22–9 | 8–6 | 8 |
| Georgia Institute of Technology | Atlantic Coast | 22–9 | 7–7 | 10 |
| University of Iowa | Big Ten | 21–10 | 13–5 | 9 |
| Iowa State University | Big 12 | 20–12 | 7–9 | 7 |
| Kansas State University | Big 12 | 21–9 | 13–3 | 5 |
| University of Louisville | Big East | 24–9 | 10–6 | 4 |
| Louisiana State University | Southeastern | 27–5 | 14–0 | 2 |
| University of Maryland, College Park | Atlantic Coast | 30–3 | 13–1 | 1 |
| University of Minnesota | Big Ten | 20–11 | 11–7 | 9 |
| University of Nebraska–Lincoln | Big 12 | 20–11 | 9–7 | 8 |
| University of Notre Dame | Big East | 23–8 | 11–5 | 5 |
| Ohio State University | Big Ten | 22–8 | 13–5 | 6 |
| University of Oklahoma | Big 12 | 21–8 | 11–5 | 4 |
| Oklahoma State University–Stillwater | Big 12 | 25–7 | 11–5 | 3 |
| University of Pittsburgh | Big East | 22–10 | 10–6 | 6 |
| Rutgers University | Big East | 24–6 | 14–2 | 2 |
| Syracuse University | Big East | 22–8 | 10–6 | 7 |
| Temple University | Atlantic 10 | 21–12 | 12–2 | 11 |
| University of Texas at Austin | Big 12 | 21–12 | 7–9 | 8 |
| University of Utah | Mountain West | 27–4 | 16–0 | 8 |
| University of Texas at El Paso | Conference USA | 27–3 | 16–0 | 7 |
| Vanderbilt University | Southeastern | 23–8 | 11–3 | 4 |
| University of Virginia | Atlantic Coast | 23–9 | 10–4 | 4 |
| West Virginia University | Big East | 24–7 | 12–4 | 5 |
| University of Wyoming | Mountain West | 24–6 | 12–4 | 11 |

== Tournament seeds ==
Greensboro RegionalGreensboro Coliseum, Greensboro, North Carolina
| Seed | School | Conference | Record | Berth type |
|---|---|---|---|---|
| 1 | Connecticut | Big East | 32–1 | Automatic |
| 2 | Rutgers | Big East | 24–6 | At-large |
| 3 | California | Pac-10 | 26–6 | At-large |
| 4 | Virginia | ACC | 23–9 | At-large |
| 5 | Old Dominion | CAA | 29–4 | Automatic |
| 6 | George Washington | Atlantic 10 | 25–6 | At-large |
| 7 | Iowa State | Big 12 | 20–12 | At-large |
| 8 | Texas | Big 12 | 21–12 | At-large |
| 9 | Minnesota | Big 10 | 20–11 | At-large |
| 10 | Georgia Tech | ACC | 22–9 | At-large |
| 11 | Auburn | SEC | 20–11 | At-large |
| 12 | Liberty | Big South | 28–3 | Automatic |
| 13 | UC Santa Barbara | Big West | 23–7 | Automatic |
| 14 | San Diego | West Coast | 19–12 | Automatic |
| 15 | Robert Morris | Northeast | 23–9 | Automatic |
| 16 | Cornell | Ivy League | 20–8 | Automatic |

Oklahoma City RegionalFord Center, Oklahoma City, Oklahoma
| Seed | School | Conference | Record | Berth type |
|---|---|---|---|---|
| 1 | North Carolina | ACC | 30–2 | Automatic |
| 2 | LSU | SEC | 27–5 | At-large |
| 3 | Oklahoma State | Big 12 | 25–7 | At-large |
| 4 | Louisville | Big East | 24–9 | At-large |
| 5 | Kansas State | Big 12 | 21–9 | At-large |
| 6 | Ohio State | Big Ten | 22–8 | At-large |
| 7 | Marist | MAAC | 31–2 | Automatic |
| 8 | Georgia | SEC | 22–9 | At-large |
| 9 | Iowa | Big Ten | 21–10 | At-large |
| 10 | DePaul | Big East | 20–11 | At-large |
| 11 | Florida State | ACC | 18–13 | At-large |
| 12 | Chattanooga | Southern | 29–3 | Automatic |
| 13 | Miami (OH) | MAC | 23–10 | Automatic |
| 14 | East Tennessee State | Atlantic Sun | 21–11 | Automatic |
| 15 | Jackson State | SWAC | 18–13 | Automatic |
| 16 | Bucknell | Patriot | 16–15 | Automatic |

New Orleans RegionalNew Orleans Arena, New Orleans, Louisiana
| Seed | School | Conference | Record | Berth type |
|---|---|---|---|---|
| 1 | Maryland | ACC | 30–3 | At-large |
| 2 | Stanford | Pac-10 | 30–3 | Automatic |
| 3 | Baylor | Big 12 | 24–6 | At-large |
| 4 | Vanderbilt | SEC | 23–8 | At-large |
| 5 | West Virginia | Big East | 24–7 | At-large |
| 6 | Pittsburgh | Big East | 22–10 | At-large |
| 7 | UTEP | Conference USA | 27–3 | At-large |
| 8 | Nebraska | Big 12 | 20–11 | At-large |
| 9 | Xavier | Atlantic 10 | 24–8 | Automatic |
| 10 | Western Kentucky | Sun Belt | 26–7 | Automatic |
| 11 | Wyoming | Mountain West | 24–6 | At-large |
| 12 | New Mexico | Mountain West | 20–12 | Automatic |
| 13 | Montana | Big Sky | 25–6 | Automatic |
| 14 | Fresno State | WAC | 22–10 | Automatic |
| 15 | Cleveland State | Horizon | 19–13 | Automatic |
| 16 | Coppin State | MEAC | 22–11 | Automatic |

Spokane RegionalSpokane Veterans Memorial Arena, Spokane, Washington
| Seed | School | Conference | Record | Berth type |
|---|---|---|---|---|
| 1 | Tennessee | SEC | 30–2 | Automatic |
| 2 | Texas A&M | Big 12 | 26–7 | Automatic |
| 3 | Duke | ACC | 23–9 | At-large |
| 4 | Oklahoma | Big 12 | 21–8 | At-large |
| 5 | Notre Dame | Big East | 23–8 | At-large |
| 6 | Arizona State | Pac-10 | 21–10 | At-large |
| 7 | Syracuse | Big East | 22–8 | At-large |
| 8 | Utah | Mountain West | 27–4 | At-large |
| 9 | Purdue | Big Ten | 18–14 | Automatic |
| 10 | Hartford | America East | 27–5 | Automatic |
| 11 | Temple | Atlantic 10 | 21–12 | At-large |
| 12 | SMU | Conference USA | 24–8 | Automatic |
| 13 | Illinois State | Missouri Valley | 26–6 | Automatic |
| 14 | Murray State | Ohio Valley | 24–7 | Automatic |
| 15 | UTSA | Southland | 23–9 | Automatic |
| 16 | Oral Roberts | Summit | 19–13 | Automatic |

== Bids by conference ==
Thirty-one conferences earned an automatic bid. In twenty-two cases, the automatic bid was the only representative from the conference. Thirty-three additional at-large teams were selected from nine of the conferences.

| Bids | Conference | Teams |
| 8 | Big 12 | Texas A&M, Baylor, Iowa St., Kansas St., Nebraska, Oklahoma, Oklahoma St., Texas |
| 8 | Big East | Connecticut, DePaul, Louisville, Notre Dame, Pittsburgh, Rutgers, Syracuse, West Virginia |
| 6 | Atlantic Coast | North Carolina, Duke, Florida St., Georgia Tech, Maryland., Virginia |
| 5 | Southeastern | Tennessee, Auburn, Georgia, LSU, Vanderbilt |
| 4 | Big Ten | Purdue, Iowa, Minnesota, Ohio St. |
| 3 | Atlantic 10 | Xavier, George Washington, Temple |
| 3 | Mountain West | New Mexico, Utah, Wyoming |
| 3 | Pacific-10 | Stanford, Arizona St., California |
| 2 | Conference USA | SMU, UTEP |
| 1 | America East | Hartford |
| 1 | Atlantic Sun | East Tenn. St. |
| 1 | Big Sky | Montana |
| 1 | Big South | Liberty |
| 1 | Big West | UC Santa Barb. |
| 1 | Colonial | Old Dominion |
| 1 | Horizon | Cleveland St. |
| 1 | Ivy | Cornell |
| 1 | Metro Atlantic | Marist |
| 1 | Mid-American | Miami Ohio |
| 1 | Mid-Eastern | Coppin St. |
| 1 | Missouri Valley | Illinois St. |
| 1 | Northeast | Robert Morris |
| 1 | Ohio Valley | Murray St. |
| 1 | Patriot | Bucknell |
| 1 | Southern | Chattanooga |
| 1 | Southland | UTSA |
| 1 | Southwestern | Jackson St. |
| 1 | Summit | Oral Roberts |
| 1 | Sun Belt | Western Kỳ. |
| 1 | West Coast | San Diego |
| 1 | Western Athletic | Fresno St. |

== Bids by state ==
The sixty-four teams came from thirty states, plus Washington, D.C. Texas had the most teams with six bids. Twenty states did not have any teams receiving bids.

NCAA Women's basketball Tournament invitations by state 2008

| Bids | State | Teams |
|---|---|---|
| 6 | Texas | SMU, Texas A&M, UTSA, Baylor, Texas, UTEP |
| 5 | California | Fresno St., San Diego, Stanford, UC Santa Barb., California |
| 4 | Ohio | Cleveland St., Miami Ohio, Xavier, Ohio St. |
| 4 | Pennsylvania | Bucknell, Robert Morris, Pittsburgh, Temple |
| 4 | Tennessee | Chattanooga, East Tenn. St., Tennessee, Vanderbilt |
| 3 | Kentucky | Murray St., Western Kỳ., Louisville |
| 3 | New York | Cornell, Marist, Syracuse |
| 3 | Oklahoma | Oral Roberts, Oklahoma, Oklahoma St. |
| 3 | Virginia | Liberty, Old Dominion, Virginia |
| 2 | Connecticut | Connecticut, Hartford |
| 2 | Georgia | Georgia, Georgia Tech |
| 2 | Illinois | Illinois St., DePaul |
| 2 | Indiana | Purdue, Notre Dame |
| 2 | Iowa | Iowa, Iowa St. |
| 2 | Maryland | Coppin St., Maryland. |
| 2 | North Carolina | North Carolina, Duke |
| 1 | Utah | Utah |
| 1 | Alabama | Auburn |
| 1 | Arizona | Arizona St. |
| 1 | District of Columbia | George Washington |
| 1 | Florida | Florida St. |
| 1 | Kansas | Kansas St. |
| 1 | Louisiana | LSU |
| 1 | Minnesota | Minnesota |
| 1 | Mississippi | Jackson St. |
| 1 | Montana | Montana |
| 1 | Nebraska | Nebraska |
| 1 | New Jersey | Rutgers |
| 1 | New Mexico | New Mexico |
| 1 | West Virginia | West Virginia |
| 1 | Wyoming | Wyoming |

== Bracket ==
Data source
NOTE: All initials used are the same in the official NCAA Bracket in External Links listed below.

=== Greensboro Regional ===
First round March 22–23
1 | Connecticut | 89
16 | Cornell | 47
Bridgeport, Connecticut – Sun/Tue
8 | Texas | 72
9 | Minnesota | 55
5 | Old Dominion | 82
12 | Liberty | 62
Norfolk, Virginia – Sun/Tue
4 | Virginia | 86
13 | UC Santa Barbara | 52
6 | George Washington | 66
11 | Auburn | 56
Stanford, California – Sat/Mon
3 | California | 77
14 | San Diego | 60
7 | Iowa State | 58
10 | Georgia Tech | 55
Des Moines, Iowa – Sat/Mon
2 | Rutgers | 85
15 | Robert Morris | 42

Second round March 24–25
1 | Connecticut | 89
8 | Texas | 55
5 | Old Dominion | 88*
4 | Virginia | 85
6 | George Washington | 55
3 | California | 53
7 | Iowa State | 58
2 | Rutgers | 69

Regional semifinals March 30
1 | Connecticut | 78
5 | Old Dominion | 63
6 | George Washington | 42
2 | Rutgers | 53

Regional finals April 1
1 | Connecticut | 66
2 | Rutgers | 56

=== Spokane Regional ===
First round March 22–23
1 | Maryland | 80
16 | Coppin State | 66
College Park, Maryland – Sun/Tue
8 | Nebraska | 61
9 | Xavier | 58
5 | West Virginia | 61
12 | New Mexico | 60
Albuquerque, New Mexico – Sat/Mon
4 | Vanderbilt | 75
13 | Montana | 62
6 | Pittsburgh | 63
11 | Wyoming | 58
Albuquerque, New Mexico – Sat/Mon
3 | Baylor | 88
14 | Fresno State | 67
7 | UTEP | 92
10 | Western Kentucky | 60
Stanford, California – Sat/Mon
2 | Stanford | 85
15 | Cleveland State | 47

Second round March 24–25
1 | Maryland | 76
8 | Nebraska | 64
5 | West Virginia | 46
4 | Vanderbilt | 64
6 | Pittsburgh | 67
3 | Baylor | 59
7 | UTEP | 54
2 | Stanford | 88

Regional semifinals March 29
1 | Maryland | 80
4 | Vanderbilt | 66
6 | Pittsburgh | 53
2 | Stanford | 72

Regional finals March 31
1 | Maryland | 87
2 | Stanford | 98

=== New Orleans Regional ===
First round March 22–23
1 | North Carolina | 85
16 | Bucknell | 50
Norfolk, Virginia – Sun/Tue
8 | Georgia | 67
9 | Iowa | 61
5 | Kansas State | 69
12 | Chattanooga | 59
Bridgeport, Connecticut – Sun/Tue
4 | Louisville | 81
13 | Miami (OH) | 67
6 | Ohio State | 49
11 | Florida State | 60
Des Moines, Iowa – Sat/Mon
3 | Oklahoma State | 85
14 | East Tennessee State | 73
7 | Marist | 76
10 | DePaul | 57
Baton Rouge, Louisiana – Sat/Mon
2 | LSU | 66
15 | Jackson State | 32

Second round March 24–25
1 | North Carolina | 80
8 | Georgia | 66
5 | Kansas State | 63
4 | Louisville | 80
11 | Florida State | 72
3 | Oklahoma State | 73*
7 | Marist | 49
2 | LSU | 68

Regional semifinals March 29
1 | North Carolina | 78
4 | Louisville | 74
3 | Oklahoma State | 52
2 | LSU | 67

Regional finals March 31
1 | North Carolina | 50
2 | LSU | 56

=== Oklahoma City Regional ===
First round March 22–23
1 | Tennessee | 94
16 | Oral Roberts | 55
West Lafayette, Indiana – Sun/Tue
8 | Utah | 59
9 | Purdue | 66
5 | Notre Dame | 75
12 | SMU | 62
West Lafayette, Indiana – Sun/Tue
4 | Oklahoma | 69
13 | Illinois State | 61
6 | Arizona State | 61
11 | Temple | 54
College Park, Maryland – Sun/Tue
3 | Duke | 78
14 | Murray State | 57
7 | Syracuse | 55
10 | Hartford | 59
Baton Rouge, Louisiana – Sat/Mon
2 | Texas A&M | 91
15 | UTSA | 52

Second round March 24–25
1 | Tennessee | 78
9 | Purdue | 52
5 | Notre Dame | 79*
4 | Oklahoma | 75
6 | Arizona State | 59
3 | Duke | 67
10 | Hartford | 39
2 | Texas A&M | 63

Regional semifinals March 30
1 | Tennessee | 74
5 | Notre Dame | 64
3 | Duke | 63
2 | Texas A&M | 77

Regional finals April 1
1 | Tennessee | 53
2 | Texas A&M | 45

=== Final Four – Tampa, Florida ===
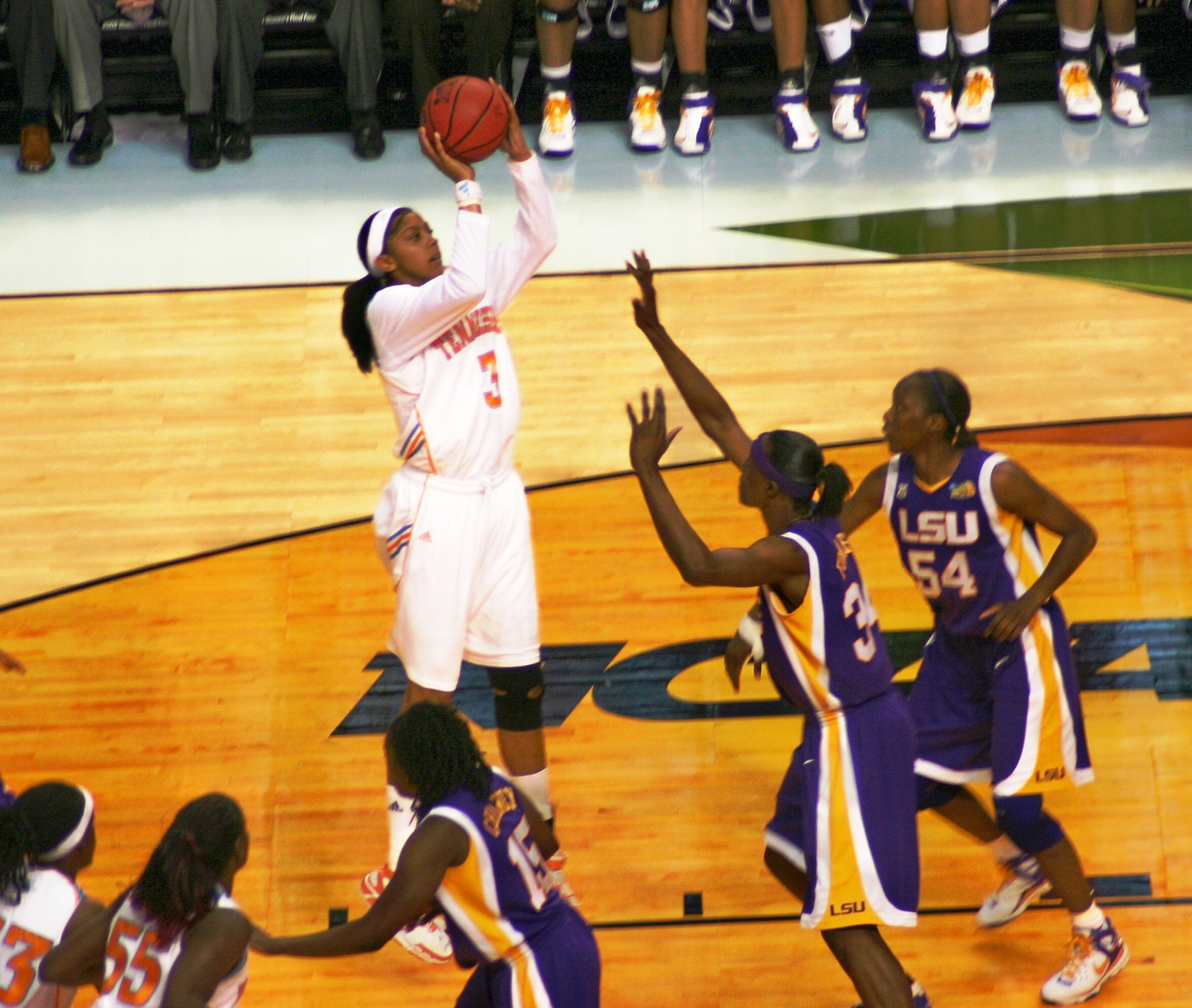
Tournament Most Outstanding Player Tennessee forward Candace Parker shoots over LSU center Sylvia Fowles in the national semifinals.

National Semifinals; April 6
GRE1 | Connecticut | 73
SPO2 | Stanford | 82
NOR2 | LSU | 46
OKC1 | Tennessee | 47

National Championship; April 8
SPO2 | Stanford | 48
OKC1 | Tennessee | 64

Initials: GRE-Greensboro; SPO-Spokane; NOR-New Orleans; OKC-Oklahoma City.

* – Denotes overtime period

== Record by conference ==
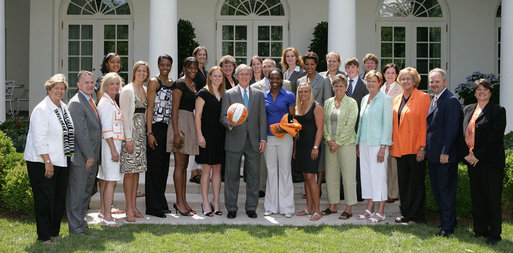
The University of Tennessee Lady Volunteers, winners of the national championship and one of two Southeastern Conference teams to reach the Final Four, are honored at the White House by President of the United States George W. Bush.

| Conference | # of Bids | Record | Win % | Sweet Sixteen | Elite Eight | Final Four | Championship Game |
|---|---|---|---|---|---|---|---|
| Colonial | 1 | 2–1 | 0.667 | 1 | - | - | - |
| Big East | 8 | 14–8 | 0.636 | 5 | 2 | 1 | - |
| SEC | 5 | 13–4 | 0.765 | 3 | 2 | 2 | 1 |
| ACC | 6 | 10–6 | 0.625 | 3 | 2 | - | - |
| Pac-10 | 3 | 7–3 | 0.700 | 1 | 1 | 1 | 1 |
| Big 12 | 8 | 11–8 | 0.579 | 2 | 1 | - | - |
| Atlantic 10 | 3 | 2–3 | 0.400 | 1 | - | - | - |
| MAAC | 1 | 1–1 | 0.500 | - | - | - | - |
| America East | 1 | 1–1 | 0.500 | - | - | - | - |
| Big Ten | 4 | 1–4 | 0.200 | - | - | - | - |
| Mountain West | 3 | 0–3 | 0.000 | - | - | - | - |
| Conference USA | 2 | 1–2 | 0.500 | - | - | - | - |

Nineteen conferences — Atlantic Sun Conference, Big Sky Conference, Big South Conference, Big West Conference, Horizon League, Ivy League, MAC, MEAC, Missouri Valley Conference, Northeast Conference, Ohio Valley Conference, Patriot League, Southern Conference, Southland, SWAC, Sun Belt Conference, Summit League, WAC and West Coast Conference — went 0–1.

== All-Tournament Team ==
- Candace Parker, Tennessee
- Shannon Bobbitt, Tennessee
- Nicky Anosike, Tennessee
- Candice Wiggins, Stanford
- Sylvia Fowles, LSU

== Game Officials ==
- Tina Napier(semifinal)
- Clarke Stevens (semifinal)
- Lisa Jones (semifinal)
- June Courteau (semifinal)
- Beverly Roberts (semifinal)
- Mary Day (semifinal)
- Dee Kantner (final)
- Eric Brewton (final)
- Denise Brooks (final)

== See also ==
- 2008 NCAA Division II women's basketball tournament
- 2008 NCAA Division III women's basketball tournament
- 2008 NAIA Division I women's basketball tournament
- 2008 NCAA Division I men's basketball tournament
