= 2007–08 Hartford Hawks women's basketball team =

Intercollegiate basketball season

2007–08 Hartford Hawks women's basketball

America East regular season champions America East tournament champions

NCAA tournament, Second Round
- Conference: America East Conference
- Record: 28–6 (14–2 America East)
- Head coach: Jennifer Rizzotti (9th season)
- Assistant coach: Bill Sullivan
- Home arena: Chase Arena at Reich Family Pavilion

2007–08 America East Conference women's basketball standings
	Conf.				Overall
Team	W		L	PCT	W		L	PCT
Hartford	14	–	2	.875	28	–	6	.824
Vermont	13	–	3	.813	24	–	9	.727
Boston U.	11	–	5	.688	20	–	12	.625
Albany	10	–	6	.625	13	–	18	.419
Binghamton	9	–	7	.563	11	–	19	.367
UMBC	5	–	11	.313	9	–	21	.300
New Hampshire	4	–	12	.250	7	–	22	.241
Maine	4	–	12	.250	7	–	23	.233
Stony Brook	2	–	14	.125	8	–	23	.258
† 2008 America East tournament winner

The 2007–08 Hartford Hawks women's basketball team represented the University of Hartford during the 2007–08 NCAA Division I women's basketball season. The hawks were led by ninth year head coach Jennifer Rizzotti. This was the second time in school history that the team advanced to the second round of the NCAA tournament.

== Roster ==
2007–08 Hartford Hawks women's basketball team
Players
Coaches

Pos.	#	Name	Height	Year	Previous school	Hometown
G	1	Jackie Smith	5 ft 9 in (1.75 m)	Fr	Holyoke	Westfield, MA
F/C	3	Kacey Pratt	6 ft 2 in (1.88 m)	So	Spencerport	Rochester, NY
G	4	Jamie McCabe	5 ft 10 in (1.78 m)	Sr	Aptos	Aptos, CA
G	10	Courtney Gomez	5 ft 5 in (1.65 m)	Sr	Norwich Free Academy	Lisbon, CT
G/F	11	Jenna Peterson	5 ft 10 in (1.78 m)	So	Oakley	Oakley, ID
G/F	14	Amanda Weaver	6 ft 1 in (1.85 m)	Fr	York Catholic	York, PA
G	21	Jonyce Hollins	5 ft 5 in (1.65 m)	Fr	Bloomfield Technical	East Orange, NJ
G	22	Mary Silvia	5 ft 11 in (1.8 m)	Fr	Reading Memorial	Reading, MA
G	23	Lisa Etienne	5 ft 6 in (1.68 m)	Jr	Penn State	Norwalk, CT
F/C	24	Danielle Hood	6 ft 1 in (1.85 m)	Sr	Walter Panas	Cortlandt Manor, NY
F	32	Erica Beverly	6 ft 0 in (1.83 m)	RS So	Kolbe Cathedral	Bridgeport, CT
G	33	MaryLynne Schaefer	5 ft 10 in (1.78 m)	Jr	Westfield	Centreville, VA
F/C	40	Diana Delva	6 ft 2 in (1.88 m)	So	Westhill	Stamford, CT
F	44	Katie Kelley	6 ft 1 in (1.85 m)	Jr	Corcoran	Syracuse, NY

Head coach

- Jennifer Rizzotti (Connecticut)

Assistant coach(es)

- Brian Mik (Southern Connecticut)
- Bill Sullivan (Connecticut)

Legend

- (C) Team captain
- (S) Suspended
- (I) Ineligible
- (W) Walk-on
- Injured
- Current redshirt

Roster

== Schedule ==
Date time, TV	Rank^{#}	Opponent^{#}	Result	Record	Site (attendance) city, state
Non-conference regular season
Nov 11, 2007*; 2:00 pm		at Kansas	L 72–76	0–1	Allen Fieldhouse; Lawrence, KS
Nov 13, 2007*; 7:00 pm		at Providence	W 77–60	1–1	Alumni Hall (178); Providence, RI
Nov 16, 2007*; 7:00 pm		Columbia	W 57–33	2–1	Chase Arena at Reich Family Pavilion; West Hartford, CT
Nov 20, 2007*; 6:30 pm		at BYU	W 70–59	3–1	Marriott Center; Provo, UT
Nov 23, 2007*; 2:00 pm		vs. UAB; Jack In The Box Rainbow Wahine Classic	W 83–74	4–1	Stan Sheriff Center; Honolulu, HI
Nov 24, 2007*; 10:30 pm		vs. Hawaii; Jack In The Box Rainbow Wahine Classic	W 76–63	5–1	Stan Sheriff Center (1,755); Honolulu, HI
Nov 25, 2007*; 10:30 pm		vs. Virginia; Jack In The Box Rainbow Wahine Classic	W 70–53	6–1	Stan Sheriff Center; Honolulu, HI
Dec 1, 2007*; 2:00 pm		at UMass	L 60–72	6–2	Mullins Center; Amherst, MA
Dec 7, 2007*; 7:00 pm		St. John's	W 64–62	7–2	Chase Arena at Reich Family Pavilion; West Hartford, CT
Dec 9, 2007*; 2:00 pm		Hofstra	W 73–42	8–2	Chase Arena at Reich Family Pavilion; West Hartford, CT
Dec 12, 2007*; 7:30 pm		at Marist	W 49–32	9–2	McCann Arena (1,538); Poughkeepsie, NY
Dec 22, 2007*; 2:00 pm		No. 23 Michigan State	W 54–51	10–2	Chase Arena at Reich Family Pavilion; West Hartford, CT
Dec 29, 2007*; 7:00 pm		at No. 1 UConn	L 24–70	10–3	XL Center; Hartford, CT
America East regular season
Jan 5, 2008; 1:00 pm		at Boston University	L 60–62	10–4 (0–1)	Case Gym; Boston, MA
Jan 13, 2008; 6:00 pm		Vermont	W 67–58	11–4 (1–1)	Chase Arena at Reich Family Pavilion; West Hartford, CT
Jan 16, 2008; 7:00 pm		at New Hampshire	W 71–56	12–4 (2–1)	Lundholm Gym; Durham, NH
Jan 19, 2008; 7:00 pm		at Maine	W 56–38	13–4 (3–1)	Alfond Arena; Orono, ME
Jan 22, 2008; 7:30 pm		Binghamton	W 62–45	14–4 (4–1)	Chase Arena at Reich Family Pavilion; West Hartford, CT
Jan 26, 2008; 2:00 pm		Albany	W 63–55	15–4 (5–1)	Chase Arena at Reich Family Pavilion; West Hartford, CT
Jan 29, 2008; 7:00 pm		at Stony Brook	W 70–55	16–4 (6–1)	Island Federal Credit Union Arena; Stony Brook, NY
Feb 5, 2008; 7:00 pm		UMBC	W 67–39	17–4 (7–1)	Chase Arena at Reich Family Pavilion; West Hartford, CT
Feb 9, 2008; 2:00 pm		Boston University	W 61–54	18–4 (8–1)	Chase Arena at Reich Family Pavilion; West Hartford, CT
Feb 13, 2008; 7:00 pm		at Vermont	L 66–69	18–5 (8–2)	Patrick Gym; Burlington, VT
Feb 16, 2008; 2:00 pm		New Hampshire	W 74–44	19–5 (9–2)	Chase Arena at Reich Family Pavilion; West Hartford, CT
Feb 20, 2008; 7:00 pm		at Binghamton	W 71–63	20–5 (10–2)	Binghamton University Events Center; Vestal, NY
Feb 27, 2008; 7:00 pm		at Albany	W 57–43	21–5 (11–2)	SEFCU Arena; Albany, NY
Mar 1, 2008; 2:00 pm		Maine	W 67–45	22–5 (12–2)	Chase Arena at Reich Family Pavilion; West Hartford, CT
Mar 5, 2008; 7:00 pm		Stony Brook	W 81–46	23–5 (13–2)	Chase Arena at Reich Family Pavilion; West Hartford, CT
Mar 8, 2008; 7:00 pm		UMBC	W 78–68	24–5 (14–2)	Retriever Activities Center; Catonsville, MD
America East tournament
Mar 14, 2008; 6:00 pm	(1)	(9) Stony Brook; Quarterfinals	W 72–41	25–5	Chase Arena at Reich Family Pavilion; West Hartford, CT
Mar 15, 2008; 5:00 pm	(1)	(4) Albany; Semifinals	W 60–40	26–5	Chase Arena at Reich Family Pavilion (1,817); West Hartford, CT
Mar 16, 2008; 5:00 pm	(1)	(3) Boston University; Championship	W 61–45	27–5	Chase Arena at Reich Family Pavilion (2,043); West Hartford, CT
NCAA Women's Tournament
Mar 22, 2008; 2:30pm, ESPN2	(10 OKC)	vs. (7 OKC) Syracuse; First round	W 59–55	28–5	Pete Maravich Assembly Center; Baton Rouge, LA
Mar 24, 2008; 9:30pm, ESPN2	(10 OKC)	vs. (2 OKC) No. 8 Texas A&M; Second round	L 39–63	28–6	Pete Maravich Assembly Center; Baton Rouge, LA
*Non-conference game. ^{#}Rankings from AP Poll. (#) Tournament seedings in parentheses. OKC=Oklahoma City. All times are in Eastern Time.
