= 2007–08 North Carolina Tar Heels women's basketball team =

Intercollegiate basketball season

2007–08 North Carolina Tar Heels women's basketball

ACC Regular Season and Tournament Champions

NCAA Tournament, Elite Eight
- Conference: Atlantic Coast Conference

Ranking
- Coaches: No. 2
- AP: No. 2
- Record: 33–3 (14–0 ACC)
- Head coach: Sylvia Hatchell
- Assistant coaches: Andrew Calder; Tracey Williams-Johnson; Charlotte Smith
- Home arena: Carmichael Auditorium

== Roster ==
Name	#	Height	Position	Year	Home town
Erlana Larkins	2	6-1	Forward	Senior	Riviera Beach, FL
Trinity Bursey	3	5-10	Forward	Sophomore	Sanford, NC
Laura Barry	4	5-8	Guard	Senior	Cary, NC
Rebecca Gray	5	5-10	Guard	Freshman	Georgetown, KY
Alex Miller	11	5-6	Guard	Senior	Durham, NC
Heather Claytor	14	5-8	Guard	Junior	Grottoes, VA
Iman McFarland	21	6-3	Forward	Junior	Temple Hills, MD
Cetera DeGraffenreid	22	5-4	Guard	Freshman	Cullowhee, NC
Meghan Austin	24	5-7	Guard	Senior	Lynchburg, VA
LaToya Pringle	30	6-3	Forward / center	Senior	Fayetteville, NC
Rashanda McCants	32	6-1	Guard / forward	Junior	Asheville, NC
Martina Wood	34	6-2	Forward / center	Redshirt sophomore	Charlotte, NC
Italee Lucas	50	5-8	Guard	Freshman	Las Vegas, NV
Jessica Breland	51	6-3	Forward	Sophomore	Kelford, NC

== Schedule and results ==
Date time, TV	Rank^{#}	Opponent^{#}	Result	Record	Site city, state
October 31*; 7:00 p.m.		Premier Players; Exhibition	W 102-75		Carmichael Auditorium; Chapel Hill, NC
November 6*; 7:00 p.m.	No. 7	China; Exhibition	W 70-68		Carmichael Auditorium; Chapel Hill, NC
November 9*; 8:30 p.m.	No. 7	North Carolina Central	W 109-32	1-0	Carmichael Auditorium; Chapel Hill, NC
November 11*; 2:30 p.m., ESPN	No. 7	No. 12 Arizona State; State Farm Women's Tip-Off Classic	W 75-60	2-0	Dean Smith Center; Chapel Hill, NC
November 13*; 7:00 p.m.	No. 6	Elon	W 98-53	3-0	Carmichael Auditorium; Chapel Hill, NC
November 16*; 7:00 p.m.	No. 6	Coppin State; Women's National Invitation Tournament	W 92-63	4-0	Carmichael Auditorium; Chapel Hill, NC
November 18*; 2:00 p.m.	No. 6	Syracuse; Women's National Invitation Tournament	W 97-72	5-0	Carmichael Auditorium; Chapel Hill, NC
November 19*; 7:00 p.m.	No. 6	Georgia State	W 99-64	6-0	Carmichael Auditorium; Chapel Hill, NC
November 25*; 2:00 p.m.	No. 6	Furman	W 77-36	7-0	Carmichael Auditorium; Chapel Hill, NC
November 27*; 7:00 p.m.	No. 4	College of Charleston	W 102-58	8-0	Carmichael Auditorium; Chapel Hill, NC
November 29*; 7:00 p.m., ESPN2	No. 4	Purdue; ACC–Big Ten Challenge	W 90-72	9-0	Carmichael Auditorium; Chapel Hill, NC
December 2*; 7:00 p.m., ESPN2	No. 4	at No. 1 Tennessee	L 79-83	9-1	Thompson-Boling Arena; Knoxville, TN
December 9*; 2:00 p.m.	No. 4	Wofford	W 102-42	10-1	Carmichael Auditorium; Chapel Hill, NC
December 17*; 7:00 p.m.	No. 3	at Coastal Carolina	W 82-58	11-1	Kimbel Arena; Conway, SC
December 20*; 7:30 p.m.	No. 3	vs. Western Kentucky	W 93-60	12-1	Myrtle Beach Convention Center; Myrtle Beach, SC
December 30*; 2:00 p.m.	No. 4	Liberty	W 88-67	13-1	Carmichael Auditorium; Chapel Hill, NC
January 5; 4:00 p.m., FSN South	No. 4	Georgia Tech	W 99-78	14-1 (1-0)	Carmichael Auditorium; Chapel Hill, NC
January 10; 7:00 p.m.	No. 3	at Virginia Tech	W 79-59	15-1 (2-0)	Cassell Coliseum; Blacksburg, VA
January 13; 1:00 p.m., FSN South	No. 3	at North Carolina State	W 79-70	16-1 (3-0)	Reynolds Coliseum; Raleigh, NC
January 17; 7:00 p.m.	No. 3	Boston College	W 87-59	17-1 (4-0)	Carmichael Auditorium; Chapel Hill, NC
January 21*; 7:00 p.m., ESPN2	No. 4	at No. 1 Connecticut	L 71-82	17-2	Gampel Pavilion; Storrs, CT
January 26; 1:00 p.m., FSN	No. 4	No. 3 Maryland	W 97-86 ^{2OT}	18-2 (5-0)	Carmichael Auditorium; Chapel Hill, NC
January 31; 7:00 p.m.	No. 3	at Wake Forest	W 76-55	19-2 (6-0)	Joel Coliseum; Winston-Salem, NC
February 4; 7:00 p.m., ESPN2	No. 3	at No. 12 Duke	W 93-76	20-2 (7-0)	Cameron Indoor Stadium; Durham, NC
February 7; 7:00 p.m.	No. 3	Clemson	W 79-47	21-2 (8-0)	Carmichael Auditorium; Chapel Hill, NC
February 10; 12:30 p.m., FSN South	No. 3	at Georgia Tech	W 75-61	22-2 (9-0)	Alexander Memorial Coliseum; Atlanta, GA
February 15; 7:00 p.m., FSN South	No. 3	at Virginia	W 90-82	23-2 (10-0)	John Paul Jones Arena; Charlottesville, VA
February 17; 1:00 p.m., FSN South	No. 3	Florida State	W 97-77	24-2 (11-0)	Carmichael Auditorium; Chapel Hill, NC
February 21; 7:00 p.m.	No. 2	at Miami	W 79-61	25-2 (12-0)	BankUnited Center; Coral Gables, FL
February 25; 7:00 p.m., FSN South	No. 2	North Carolina State	W 85-79	26-2 (13-0)	Carmichael Auditorium; Chapel Hill, NC
March 2; 5:30 p.m., FSN	No. 2	No. 11 Duke	W 82-51	27-2 (14-0)	Carmichael Auditorium; Chapel Hill, NC
March 7; 3:00 p.m.	No. 2	vs. Clemson; ACC Tournament Quarterfinals, No. 1 vs. No. 9	W 97-77	28-2	Greensboro Coliseum; Greensboro, NC
March 8; 1:00 p.m., FSN	No. 2	vs. No. 25 Virginia; ACC Tournament Semifinals, No. 1 vs. No. 4	W 80-65	29-2	Greensboro Coliseum; Greensboro, NC
March 9; 1:00 p.m., FSN	No. 2	vs. No. 11 Duke; ACC Tournament Championship Game, No. 1 vs. No. 3	W 86-73	30-2	Greensboro Coliseum; Greensboro, NC
March 23*; 12:00 p.m., ESPN Regional	No. 2	vs. Bucknell; NCAA Tournament First Round, No. 1 vs. No. 16	W 85-50	31-2	Ted Constant Convocation Center; Norfolk, VA
March 25*; 10:10 p.m., ESPN Regional	No. 2	vs. No. 24 Georgia; NCAA Tournament Second Round, No. 1 vs. No. 8	W 80-66	32-2	Ted Constant Convocation Center; Norfolk, VA
March 29*; 12:00 p.m., ESPN	No. 2	vs. No. 22 Louisville; NCAA Tournament Sweet Sixteen, No. 1 vs. No. 4	W 78-74	33-2	New Orleans Arena; New Orleans, LA
March 31*; 7:30 p.m., ESPN	No. 2	vs. No. 5 Louisiana State; NCAA Tournament Elite Eight, No. 1 vs. No. 2	L 50-56	33-3	New Orleans Arena; New Orleans, LA
*Non-conference game. ^{#}Rankings from Coaches' Poll. (#) Tournament seedings in parentheses. All times are in Eastern Time.

== Standings ==
ACC	Conference			Overall	
ACC	W-L	GB	PCT	W-L	PCT
#2 North Carolina	14-0	-	1.000	33-3	.917
#4 Maryland	13-1	1	.929	33-3	.917
#11 Duke	10-4	4	.714	25-10	.714
#25 Virginia	10-4	4	.714	24-10	.706
Georgia Tech	7-7	7	.500	22-10	.688
Florida State	7-7	7	.500	19-14	.578
Boston College	7-7	7	.500	21-12	.636
North Carolina State	6-8	8	.429	21-12	.636
Clemson	4-10	10	.286	12-19	.387
Virginia Tech	2-12	12	.143	15-15	.500
Wake Forest	2-12	12	.143	15-15	.500
Miami	2-12	12	.143	9-21	.300
