= 2007–08 Marist Red Foxes women's basketball team =

Intercollegiate basketball season

2007–08 Marist Red Foxes women's basketball
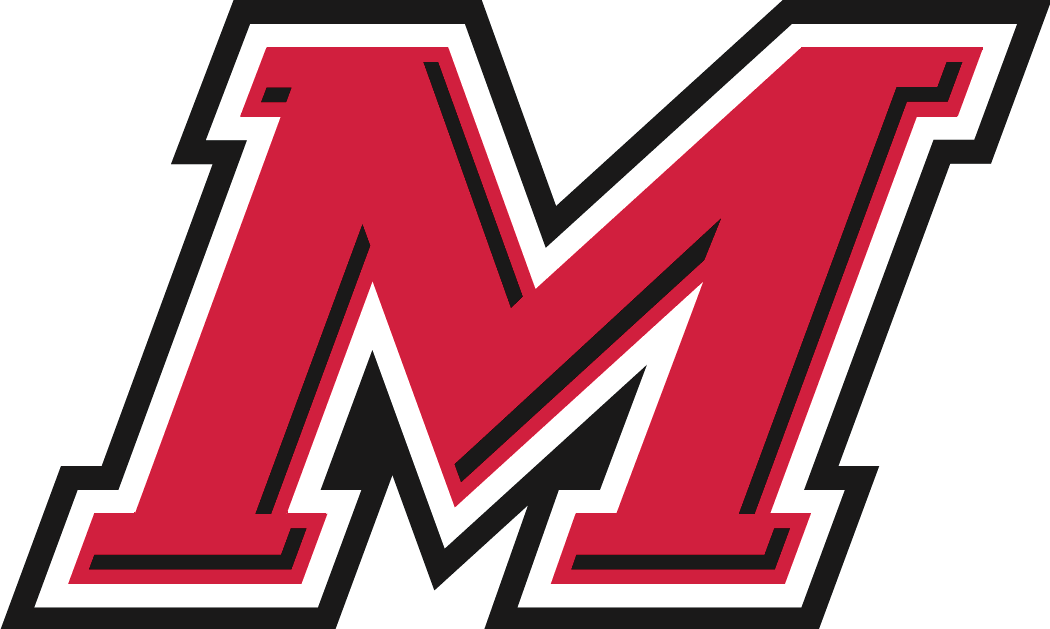

MAAC Regular Season Champions MAAC Tournament Champions

2008 NCAA Tournament, second round
- Conference: Metro Atlantic Athletic Conference

Ranking
- Coaches: No. 23
- AP: No. 22
- Record: 32–3 (18–0 MAAC)
- Head coach: Brian Giorgis (6th season)
- Assistant coaches: Megan Gebbia; Erin Leger; Keila Whittington
- Home arena: McCann Center

2007–08 MAAC women's basketball standings
	Conf.				Overall
Team	W		L	PCT	W		L	PCT
#22 Marist †	18	–	0	1.000	32	–	3	.914
Iona	11	–	7	.611	20	–	14	.588
Fairfield	11	–	7	.611	22	–	9	.710
Manhattan	10	–	8	.556	15	–	15	.500
Saint Peter's	10	–	8	.556	19	–	12	.613
Siena	7	–	11	.389	11	–	18	.379
Loyola (MD)	7	–	11	.389	13	–	17	.433
Canisius	7	–	11	.389	13	–	18	.419
Niagara	6	–	12	.333	8	–	22	.267
Rider	3	–	15	.167	8	–	22	.267
† 2008 MAAC tournament winner As of March 26, 2008; Rankings from AP Poll

The 2007–08 Marist Red Foxes women's basketball team represented Marist College during the 2007–08 NCAA Division I women's basketball season. The Red Foxes, led by sixth year head coach Brian Giorgis, play their home games at the McCann Center and were members of the Metro Atlantic Athletic Conference. They finished the season ranked No. 22 and went 32–3, 18–0 in MAAC play to finish in first place to win the MAAC regular season title for the fifth consecutive time. In the MAAC women's basketball tournament, they defeated #8 seed Canisius in the quarterfinals, #5 seed Saint Peter's in the semifinals, and #2 seed Iona in the championship game to earn the conference's automatic bid to the NCAA women's tournament. It was their third consecutive MAAC Tournament championship. Sarah Smrdel was named tournament MVP. Rachel Fitz and Nikki Flores were named to the All Tournament team. As a #7 seed, they defeated #10 seed DePaul 76–57 in the First Round before falling to #2 seed and No. 6 LSU 49–68 in the Second Round.

== Roster ==
2007–08 Marist Red Foxes women's basketball team
Players
Coaches

Pos.	#	Name	Height	Year	Previous school	Hometown
G	3	Julianne Viani	5 ft 7 in (1.7 m)	RS Jr	Our Lady of Lourdes	Poughkeepsie, NY
G	5	Elise Caron	5 ft 5 in (1.65 m)	Fr	Cégep Édouard-Montpetit	Quebec, Canada
G	10	Erica Allenspach	5 ft 8 in (1.73 m)	Fr	Miamisburg	Miamisburg, OH
G	11	Brittany Engle	5 ft 9 in (1.75 m)	So	Oliver Ames	South Easton, MA
F	12	Rachele Fitz	6 ft 0 in (1.83 m)	So	Trinity	Seven Hills, OH
C	13	Maria Laterza	6 ft 3 in (1.91 m)	Fr	Bishop Kearney	Brooklyn, NY
F/C	14	Meg Dahlman	6 ft 3 in (1.91 m)	RS Sr	Holy Cross	Spencerport, NY
G	22	Nikki Flores	5 ft 4 in (1.63 m)	Sr	Immaculate Heart Academy	Montvale, NJ
G/F	24	Alexis Waters	5 ft 9 in (1.75 m)	Sr	Lansing Sexton	Lansing, MI
G/F	31	Lynzee Johnson	5 ft 10 in (1.78 m)	So	Bellbrook	Bellbrook, OH
G	33	Courtney Kolesar (redshirt)	5 ft 8 in (1.73 m)	Sr	Painesville-Riverside	Concord, OH
F	42	Sarah Huff	6 ft 3 in (1.91 m)	Fr	Canal Winchester	Canal Winchester, OH
F	50	Sarah Smrdel	6 ft 2 in (1.88 m)	Sr	Mentor	Mentor, OH

Head coach

- Brian Giorgis (SUNY Cortland)

Assistant coach(es)

- Megan Gebbia (Towson)
- Erin Leger (Marist)
- Keila Whittington (Dillard)

Legend

- (C) Team captain
- (S) Suspended
- (I) Ineligible
- (W) Walk-on
- Injured
- Current redshirt

Roster
Last update: March 5, 2008

== Schedule ==
Date time, TV	Rank^{#}	Opponent^{#}	Result	Record	Site (attendance) city, state
Regular Season
Nov 11, 2007*; 2:00 p.m.		at No. 16 Ohio State	L 57–63	0–1	Value City Arena (3,322); Columbus, OH
Nov 14, 2007*; 7:00 p.m.		at Fordham	W 75–55	1–1	Rose Hill Gym (358); Bronx, NY
Nov 16, 2007*; 7:00 p.m.		at Stony Brook	W 65–54	2–1	Stony Brook Arena (264); Stony Brook, NY
Nov 18, 2007*; 2:00 p.m.		at Dartmouth	W 71–35	3–1	Leede Arena (918); Hanover, NH
Nov 22, 2007*; 7:30 p.m.		vs. Utah; Oahu Classic	W 70–66 ^{OT}	4–1	McKinley High School Gym (111); Honolulu, HI
Nov 23, 2007*; 7:30 p.m.		vs. Nebraska; Oahu Classic	W 66–59	5–1	McKinley High School Gym (134); Honolulu, HI
Nov 24, 2007*; 12:00 p.m.		vs. Eastern Washington; Oahu Classic	W 74–50	6–1	McKinley High School Gym (323); Honolulu, HI
Nov 29, 2007*; 7:30 p.m.		Yale	W 77–62	7–1	McCann Center (1,814); Poughkeepsie, NY
Dec 1, 2007; 2:00 p.m.		Bucknell	W 68–56	8–1	McCann Center (1,549); Poughkeepsie, NY
Dec 7, 2007; 7:00 p.m.		Iona	W 81–55	9–1 (1–0)	McCann Center (1,753); Poughkeepsie, NY
Dec 9, 2007; 1:00 p.m.		at Fairfield	W 55–44	10–1 (2–0)	Alumni Hall (838); Fairfield, CT
Dec 12, 2007*; 7:30 p.m.		Hartford	L 32–49	10–2	McCann Center (1,538); Poughkeepsie, NY
Dec 22, 2007*; 2:00 p.m.		at Albany	W 75–71	11–2	SEFCU Arena (325); Albany, NY
Dec 30, 2007*; 2:00 p.m.		at Akron	W 76–62	12–2	Rhodes Arena (401); Akron, OH
Jan 5, 2008; 7:30 p.m.		Fairfield	W 73–43	13–2 (3–0)	McCann Center (1,975); Poughkeepsie, NY
Jan 11, 2008; 7:00 p.m.		at Loyola (MD)	W 61–59	14–2 (4–0)	Reitz Arena (582); Baltimore, MD
Jan 13, 2008; 2:00 p.m.		at Manhattan	W 61–59	15–2 (5–0)	Draddy Gymnasium (201); Riverdale, NY
Jan 18, 2008; 5:00 p.m.		at Iona	W 86–78	16–2 (6–0)	Hynes Athletic Center (873); New Rochelle, NY
Jan 21, 2008; 4:00 p.m.		Canisius	W 93–66	17–2 (7–0)	McCann Center (2,060); Poughkeepsie, NY
Jan 25, 2008; 7:00 p.m.		Siena	W 78–48	18–2 (8–0)	McCann Center (3,200); Poughkeepsie, NY
Jan 27, 2008; 12:00 p.m.		Loyola (MD)	W 85–59	19–2 (9–0)	McCann Center (2,128); Poughkeepsie, NY
Feb 1, 2008; 7:00 p.m.		Rider	W 84–63	20–2 (10–0)	McCann Center (2,245); Poughkeepsie, NY
Feb 3, 2008; 2:00 p.m.		at Siena	W 79–70	21–2 (11–0)	Alumni Recreation Center (1,271); Loudonville, NY
Feb 8, 2008; 7:00 p.m.		at Niagara	W 75–54	22–2 (12–0)	Gallagher Center (423); Lewiston, NY
Feb 10, 2008; 2:00 p.m.		at Canisius	W 91–46	23–2 (13–0)	Koessler Athletic Center (711); Buffalo, NY
Feb 15, 2008; 7:30 p.m.		Niagara	W 66–51	24–2 (14–0)	McCann Center (2,284); Poughkeepsie, NY
Feb 17, 2008; 2:00 p.m.		at Rider	W 76–46	25–2 (15–0)	Alumni Gymnasium (1,494); Lawrenceville, NJ
Feb 24, 2008; 2:00 p.m.		Manhattan	W 71–61	26–2 (16–0)	McCann Center (2,821); Poughkeepsie, NY
Feb 27, 2008; 7:00 p.m.	No. 25	at Saint Peter's	W 70–57	27–2 (17–0)	Yanitelli Center (645); Jersey City, NJ
Mar 1, 2008; 7:30 p.m.	No. 25	Saint Peter's	W 71–58	28–2 (18–0)	McCann Center (2,594); Poughkeepsie, NY
MAAC Women's Tournament
Mar 7, 2008; 1:30 p.m.	(1) No. 24	vs. (8) Canisius; Quarterfinals	W 54–44	29–2	Times Union Center; Albany, NY
Mar 8, 2008; 11:30 a.m.	(1) No. 24	vs. (5) Saint Peter's; Semifinals	W 78–67	30–2	Times Union Center (3,156); Albany, NY
Mar 9, 2008; 11:00 a.m.	(1) No. 24	vs. (2) Iona; Championship	W 83–63	31–2	Times Union Center (2,007); Albany, NY
NCAA tournament
Mar 22, 2008; 8:00 p.m.	(7) No. 22	vs. (10) DePaul; First Round	W 76–57	32–2	Maravich Center; Baton Rouge, LA
Mar 24, 2008; 7:00 p.m.	(7) No. 22	at (2) No. 6 LSU; Second Round	L 49–68	32–3	Maravich Center; Baton Rouge, LA
*Non-conference game. ^{#}Rankings from AP Poll. (#) Tournament seedings in parentheses. All times are in Eastern Time.
