= List of New College of Florida alumni =

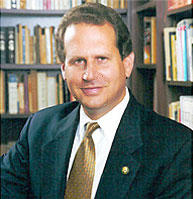
Lincoln Díaz-Balart

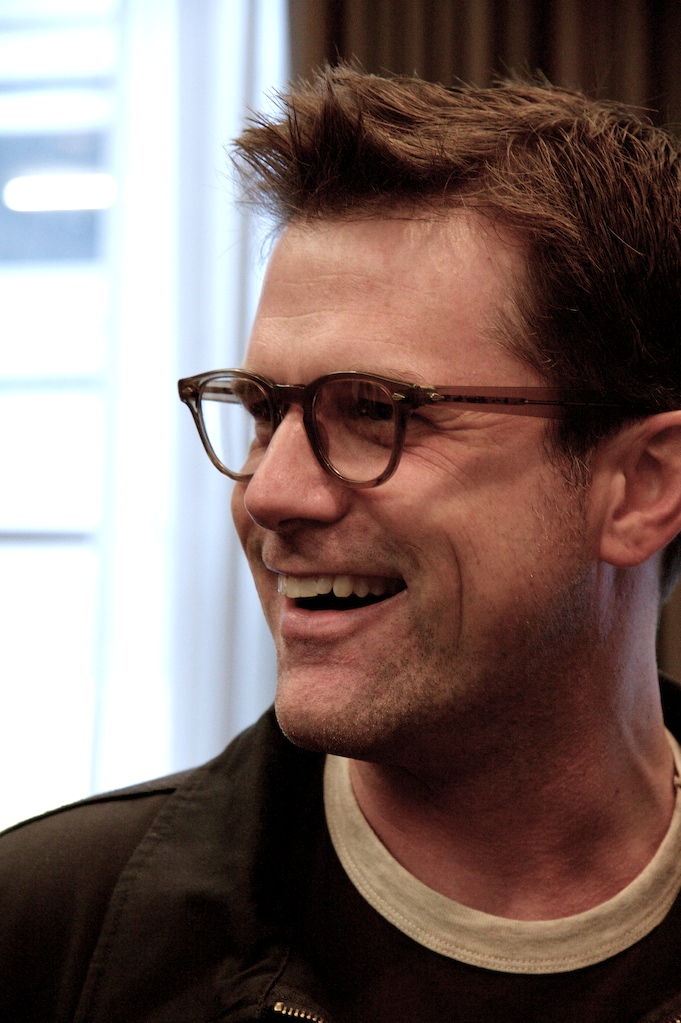
Merlin Mann

David M. Smolin

Alumni	Notability
Anita L. Allen	Henry R. Silverman Professor of Law and professor of philosophy at the University of Pennsylvania Law School
David Allen	Writer and productivity consultant, developed the "Getting Things Done" method of time management
Robert D. Atkinson	Author and founder of the Information Technology and Innovation Foundation
Esther Barazzone	President of Chatham University
Bruce Beresford-Redman	Reality TV producer, convicted murderer
Robert Bilott	Environmental attorney known for lawsuits against DuPont on behalf of plaintiffs from West Virginia; subject of the 2019 movie Dark Waters
Adrianne Black	Former white supremacist leader who rejected her family's ideology in favor of tolerance; subject of Eli Saslow's 2018 book Rising out of Hatred: The Awakening of a Former White Nationalist
Malcolm Brenner	Author and zoophile
Richard Canary	Professor of Mathematics at the University of Michigan
Paul Cebar	Singer-songwriter
Michael DeMaria	Clinical psychologist, author, and musician
José Díaz-Balart	Emmy Award-winning journalist, Telemundo and NBC national news anchor
Lincoln Díaz-Balart	Former United States congressman
Rick Doblin	President and founder of the Multidisciplinary Association for Psychedelic Studies
The Dollyrots	Co-founded by Kelly Ogden (lead vocals and bassist) and Luis Cabezas (guitarist)
William C. Dudley	President, New York Federal Reserve Bank
Stephen Duprey	New Hampshire businessman and politician; member of the Republican National Committee; four-term chair of the New Hampshire Republican State Committee; elected in 1972 at age 19 to the New Hampshire House of Representatives as the youngest state representative in the U.S.
Margee Ensign	President, Dickinson College; former president, American University of Nigeria; awarded the African Leadership Award in Educational Excellence by African Leadership Magazine (2011)
Carol Flint	Emmy Award-winning television writer and producer, ER, The West Wing
X González	Anti-gun violence activist
Jennifer Granick	Attorney; director of Civil Liberties, Stanford Center for Internet and Society; former Civil Liberties director, Electronic Frontier Foundation
Elaine Hall	Emmy Award winner, founder and director of The Miracle Project
Paul K. Hansma	Presidential scholar in physics, namesake of the Paul Hansma Research Group at the Department of Physics of the University of California, Santa Barbara
Aaron Hillegass	Author, programmer, educator, founder of Big Nerd Ranch, investor;named one of the top 10 amateur stock pickers in America by Forbes in 2014
Cheryl Horner	Emmy-winning TV producer for shows including True Life and Laverne Cox Presents: The T Word, Emmy-nominated for Bean and Sins of the Parents: The Crumbley Trials, Peabody winner for MTV's Fight For Your Rights: Protect Yourself campaign
Rowan Jacobsen	Science and food author; founder of Oysterater.com; winner of the James Beard Award; Alicia Patterson Foundation fellow, McGraw Center for Business Journalism fellow, Knight Science Journalism fellow at MIT
Jaymay	Singer-songwriter
Joel Judd	Attorney; former member of the Colorado House of Representatives
Victoria Kolakowski	First openly transgender person to serve as a trial court judge of general jurisdiction in the U.S.
Sung-Yoon Lee	North Korea scholar, U.S. government advisor
Sondra London	True crime author of True Vampires, The Making of a Serial Killer and Good Little Soldiers
Brian Lukacher	Art historian, professor of art history at Vassar College
Merlin Mann	Writer, editor, and podcaster
Melissa Cristina Márquez	Marine biologist, science communicator, author of Mother of Sharks and Wild Survival!
Sharon Matola	Biologist, environmentalist, founder and director of the Belize Zoo
Nancy McEldowney	Diplomat; director of the Master of Science in Foreign Service (MSFS) program at the Walsh School of Foreign Service at Georgetown University; former director, Foreign Service Institute; former U.S. ambassador to Bulgaria
Ramón Mujica Pinilla	Librarian, executive director of Peruvian National Library under three presidents; historian; anthropologist
Sharon Landesman Ramey	Behavioral scientist specializing in child development; fellow of the American Association for the Advancement of Science
Nicholas Schaffner	Writer, rock & roll journalist, expert on The Beatles; died August 28, 1991
Eric Schickler	Jeffrey and Ashley McDermott Endowed Professor of Political Science at the University of California, Berkeley
David M. Smolin	Professor of Law at the Cumberland School of Law; director of Cumberland School of Law's Center for Biotechnology, Law, and Ethics
William Thurston	Mathematician, 1982 winner of the Fields Medal
Josh Tickell	Biodiesel advocate; author; director of the documentary Fuel, which won the audience award at the 2008 Sundance Film Festival
Steve Randy Waldman	Computer programmer, economics writer, and "Danish libertarian"; blogger at Interfluidity
Ira Wallace	Organic gardener, teacher and author, manager of Southern Exposure Seed Exchange
Jackie Wang	Academic and poet, finalist for 2021 National Book Award for Poetry and author of Carceral Capitalism (2018)
Mark Weiser	Former chief scientist at Xerox PARC Laboratories; founder of ubiquitous computing
John Wilke	Investigative reporter at The Wall Street Journal
Sam Zamarripa	First Hispanic to serve in the Georgia state senate
