= ELCA Youth Gathering =

Youth gatherings of the Evangelical Lutheran Church in America

- Location: Various
- Years active: 1988–present
- Founded: 1988
- Website: elca.org/gathering

The ELCA Youth Gathering is a national convention of the Evangelical Lutheran Church in America (ELCA) for high school-aged youth, held every three years in a different city in the United States. The gathering program lasts about five days and combines large mass gatherings, learning activities, and local service opportunities. Each events has a central theme focused on a biblical passage.

The ELCA Youth Gathering has been held since 1988, just after the creation of the ELCA (a merger of three national Lutheran church bodies) in January 1988. Predecessor churches also hosted national Luther League conventions, as they were called, dating to the early 20th century.

A series of three gatherings (2000, 2003, and 2006) implemented a gathering schedule that provided two smaller gatherings on successive weeks in order to accommodate a larger number of participants.

== Specific gatherings ==
=== New Orleans 2009 ===
In July 2009, 37,000 Lutheran youth and their chaperones attended a gathering in New Orleans to help with the problems that Hurricane Katrina had inflicted on the city and surrounding suburbs in 2005. "This was the biggest convention since Katrina", as noted by bestofneworleans.com. The host city is normally chosen several years in advance, so New Orleans had already been selected as the gathering site prior to Hurricane Katrina. After conversation with city leaders, it was determined the gathering would continue as scheduled. The theme for the gathering was "Jesus, Justice, Jazz", with the biblical theme centered on Philippians 2:1–8.

The days of the gathering were split in two, with the mornings focusing on either Jesus, justice, or jazz (in line with the theme of the gathering). On the day focused on Jesus, the youth would search their spiritual lives. On the day focused on jazz, the youth learned about the stories and experiences New Orleans had during Hurricane Katrina. On the day focused on justice, the youth took part in various service learning activities including replanting marsh grasses; restoring Holt Cemetery through weeding, planting and fixing grave stones; hosting community fairs to promote health and literacy; and painting and fixing up broken homes.

Guest speakers

- Ray Nagin, mayor of New Orleans
- Marc Kielburger, founder of Free the Children
- Pastor Jay Bakker
- Viola Vaughn, who started the village school for girls in Senegal, West Africa
- Becca Stevens, founder of Thistle Farms and Magdalene
- Spencer West, American motivational speaker and disability advocate
- Michel Chikwanine, child soldier from Uganda
- Donald Miller, author of Blue Like Jazz
- Anne Mahlum, founder of Back on My Feet
- Venice Williams, worked with community gardens

Musicians

- Agape
- Group1Crew
- Celia Whitler http://celiamusic.net
- Skillet
- Lost and Found
- The Flying Karamazov Brothers
- The Katinas
- Guyland Leday: 9 yr old accordion player
- Amanda Shaw: 16 yr old violinist
- Rachel Kurtz

=== New Orleans 2012 ===
The 2012 ELCA Youth Gathering took place in New Orleans on July 18–22 under the theme "Citizen with the Saints". The 33,309 youth and chaperones who attended the gathering went to more than 400 different volunteer sites on the Practice Justice Day. The Mercedes-Benz Superdome, affectionately re-dubbed the "LutherDome", reprised its role from the 2009 event and hosted a mass gathering each evening of the 18th to the 21st, and a final morning service on July 22. Each of the three full days of the gathering (July 19–21) was designated for a different "practice" of faith. On Practice Peacemaking day, youth were encouraged to visit exhibitions, participate in sports and other activities, donate hair, blood, and money to build wells at the Ernest N. Memorial Convention Center. Practice Justice day saw the youth coming together to complete volunteer service learning projects through the city. Finally, Practice Discipleship was a day of worship and bible study in which each church's group met with other groups from the same synod. This was the first time any city had hosted a third gathering, as well as the first time two consecutive gatherings have been held in the same city.

The "LutherDome" sessions were emceed by students Kaelie Lund and Josiah Williams. Speakers and performers, organized by night, included:

==== Wednesday July 18 ====
- Rev. Yehiel Curry
- Bishop Michael Rinehart
- Pastor Nadia Bolz-Weber
- AGAPE, Christian rapper
- Rachel Kurtz, Christian singer
- Roots of Music, local New Orleans children's music program
- Lost and Found, musical act

==== Thursday July 19 ====
- Shane Claiborne
- Mark Hanson, ELCA Presiding Bishop
- Valerie Rivas
- Eric Hoelzi
- Megan Stubbs
- Elijah Furquan, musical act
- Tony Memme, (musical act
- Aaron Strumpel, musical act

==== Friday July 20 ====
- Leymah Gbowee, 2011 Nobel Peace Prize Laureate
- Kelly Wallace
- Diane Latiker
- Jamie Nabozny
- Rhema Soul, musical act
- Lost and Found, musical act

==== Saturday July 21 ====
- Rev. Andrena Ingram
- Greg von Wald
- Preservation Hall Junior Jazz and Heritage Brass Band, local New Orleans children's and adolescent's musical act
- Switchfoot, alternative / Christian rock band

=== Detroit 2015 ===
The 2015 ELCA Youth Gathering took place in Detroit, Michigan, on July 15–19. More than 30,000 youth and chaperones attended this gathering, going out to over 600 different volunteer sites on the Proclaim Justice Day. The theme for the 2015 gathering was "Rise Up". Ford Field, hosted a mass gathering each evening from the 15th to the 18th, and a final morning service on July 19. Each of the three full days of the gathering was designated for a different "practice" of faith. On Proclaim Community day, youth were encouraged to visit exhibitions, participate in sports and other activities, and donate hair, blood, and money to build wells at the Cobo Center. Proclaim Justice day saw the youth coming together to complete volunteer service projects. Finally, Proclaim Story was a day of worship and bible study in which each church's group met with other groups from the same ELCA synod. This was the first time Detroit had hosted a gathering.

Speakers and performers at the Ford Field nightly sessions, organized by night, included:

==== Wednesday July 15 ====
- Elizabeth Eaton, ELCA Presiding Bishop
- Mikka McCracken
- Rev. Dr. Luke A. Powery
- Agape, Christian rapper
- Lost and Found, musical act

==== Thursday July 16 ====
- Karis Ailabouni
- Eric Barreto
- Rev. Alexia Salvatierra

==== Friday July 17 ====
- Rani Abdulmasih
- Sarah Funkhouser
- Steve Jerbi
- Emily Scott
- The Temptations

==== Saturday July 18 ====
- Kyle Larson
- Veronika Scott
- Rozella White
- Marian Wright Edelman
- Skillet (band)

=== Houston 2018 ===
The 2018 ELCA Youth Gathering took place in Houston, Texas, from June 27 to July 1. The theme for the 2018 gathering was "This Changes Everything". Mass gathering events were held at NRG Stadium on the evenings of June 27 to 30 with a final morning service on July 1. July 28 to 30 were designated as a 3-day rotation of Learning Days for the time leading up to the gathering. On Synod Day, gatherers met with their respective synods for worship and fellowship in designated locations. On the day of Service Learning, gatherers were split into groups and engaged in various service projects throughout Houston. Being that the city was in the aftermath of Hurricane Harvey, many of these service projects related to construction. Gatherers were invited to "shift" their perspective of service "by focusing on stories, healing, intersections, faith, and togetherness". Once their respective service projects was finished, each of the groups arrived at NRG Arena for various activities. On the day of Interactive Learning, attendees gathered at NRG Center and engaged in various interactive activities and learning opportunities throughout the venue.

Speakers and performers organized by night were:

==== Wednesday June 27 ====
===== Speakers =====
- Prairie Rose Seminole
- Bishop Michael Rinehart
- Rev. Tuhina Rasche
- Debora D.E.E.P Mouton
- Elizabeth Eaton, ELCA Presiding Bishop

===== Performers =====
- Agape, Christian rapper
- LZ7
- Josiah Williams
- Ginny Owens

==== Thursday June 28th ====
===== Speakers =====
- Caroline Meeker
- Rev. Aaron Fuller
- Deacon Erin Power
- Marlon Hall

===== Performers =====
- Ryan Brown
- Rachel Kurtz
- Guardians Drum and Bugle Corps

==== Friday June 29 ====
===== Speakers =====
- Elizabeth Peter
- Rev. Will Starkweather
- Michaela Shelly
- Rev. Nadia Bolz-Weber
- Jasmine Seguarra

===== Performers =====
- Tauren Wells

==== Saturday June 30 ====
===== Speakers =====
- Rev. Dr. Stephen Bouman
- Deborah D.E.E.P Mouton
- Carson McCullar
- Joe Davis
- Jamie and Rebekah Bruesehoff
- Maria Rose Belding

===== Performers =====
- Tenth Avenue North

==== Sunday July 1 ====
===== Speakers =====
- Elizabeth Eaton, ELCA Presiding Bishop
- Savanna Sullivan

== Locations and themes ==
Year	Location	Venue	Theme	Bible verse
1988	San Antonio	HemisFair Arena	"Rejoice in the Lord Always"	Philippians 4: 4–7
1991	Dallas	Reunion Arena/Hyatt Regency Convention Center	"Called to Freedom"	1 Timothy 4:12
1994	Atlanta	Georgia Dome	"2 Be Alive"	
1997	New Orleans	Louisiana Superdome	"River of Hope"	
2000	St. Louis	Edward Jones Dome	"Dancing at the Crossroads"	
2003	Atlanta	Georgia Dome	"Ubuntu" ("Do Life")	
2006	San Antonio	Alamodome	"Cruzando" ("Crossing")	
2009	New Orleans	Louisiana Superdome	"Jesus, Justice, Jazz"	Philippians 2:1-8
2012	New Orleans	Mercedes-Benz Superdome	"Citizens With the Saints"	Ephesians 2:14-20
2015	Detroit	Ford Field	"Rise Up Together"	The Gospel of Mark
2018	Houston	NRG Stadium	"This Changes Everything"	Ephesians 2:8
~~2021*~~	~~Minneapolis~~	~~U.S. Bank Stadium~~	~~"boundless: God beyond measure"~~	~~Ephesians 3:14-21~~
2024	New Orleans	Smoothie King Center	Created to Be	Psalm 139:14
2027	Minneapolis	U.S. Bank Stadium	Imagine More	Ephesians 3:20 (Inclusive)

*The Gathering, originally scheduled for 2021, was rescheduled for 2022 due to the COVID-19 pandemic and then canceled.
