= Jaconelli =

Jaconelli is an Italian surname. Notable people with the surname include:

- Charlotte Jaconelli (born 1995) British actress and singer
- Emilio Jaconelli (born 1983), Scottish footballer
- Ernesto Jaconelli (1917–1999), piano accordion player

== See also ==
- Yaconelli
- Iaconelli
