= Cheryl Horner =

American television producer

- Born: Miami
- Occupation: Filmmaker
- Known for: Parkland Rising
- Title: Owner, Gigantic! Productions
- Spouse: Dave Sirulnick (married 2002-2017)
- Children: 2
- Awards: Emmy, Peabody, GLAAD, Prism

Cheryl Horner is an American producer and entrepreneur. Horner is a two-time Emmy Award winner for her work on MTV's True Life series and the documentary special Laverne Cox Presents: The T Word. Horner was nominated for an Emmy Award for 2024's Sins of the Parents: The Crumbley Trials as well as 2017's Bean. She has won a Peabody Award for her work on MTV's sexual health campaign Fight For Your Rights: Protect Yourself, and has been nominated for multiple GLAAD Awards.

== Early life and education ==
Horner was born in Miami. She attended Oviedo High School. She got her Bachelor's in Media Arts from the New College of Florida in Sarasota, Florida, graduating in 1991.

== Career ==
Horner began her career at Showtime in 1993 as a production assistant. She moved to Atlanta and became an associate producer and later, a segment producer for CNN and Cartoon Network. She lived in Australia from 1995 to 1997, working for Showtime and Encore as a creative director. Horner was based in Bucharest for HBO International as creative director as part of the launch of HBO Romania in 1997.

=== MTV Series and docs ===
In 1999, Horner began working for MTV News and MTV production in New York, making a shift from interstitial content to show production. She was a writer and producer on MTV's Choose or Lose 2000 series, MTV's initiative to encourage young people to vote. Horner was a writer on Choose or Lose: Gun Fight, segment producer on Choose or Lose: Why Care? and producer as well as writer on Choose or Lose: Sex Laws. It was at this point in her career that Horner discovered her love for documentaries. As soon as she had the opportunity to work on the True Life series, she shifted her focus completely to documentaries.

In 2006, Horner was director and producer on MTV News & Docs Fat Camp which followed five teens to a fat camp for a day-by-day look at their struggle to turn their lives around and found that for these overweight campers, finding love, rebelling against authority, or just trying to fit in were all-consuming obsessions. In 2007, Horner produced the follow up, Return to Fat Camp.

Horner is the recipient of multiple Prism Awards for documentaries about drug addiction, including the 2007 Prism Award for MTV's True Life: I'm Addicted to Crystal Meth.

=== Gigantic! Productions ===
In 2001, Horner founded Gigantic! Productions in Tribeca, NYC. Under Horner's tutelage, Gigantic! produced 2009's Ice Queens, a documentary which followed three teenage figure skaters as they were prepping for their biggest competition of the year. Also that year, Gigantic! co-produced with ISH Entertainment 2009's Gone Too Far, a drug intervention series hosted by DJ Am. AM died of a drug overdose after filming ended; the series aired with his family's consent. Gigantic! also produced, with Horner as EP, 2010's Sexting in America: When Privates Go Public, 2011's MTV's Top 10 Most Outrageous Sex Myths, and 2011's Secretly Pregnant, which reflected on the stories of women who hid their pregnancies from family, friends, loved one, each with her own reason.

Horner and her team at Gigantic! continued to produce documentaries and series, with star power attached like 2012's The Break, a documentary that followed three diverse young people eager to rebuild their lives and become self-sufficient members of society. U2’s The Edge was an EP and Anne Mahlum, the founder of SOLIDCORE, was the host. Horner also led the team in the production of Washington Heights, which followed nine best friends from the New York City neighborhood as they navigated the obstacles in their way of individual pursuits. In 2014, Horner produced the documentary special Laverne Cox Presents: The T Word which aired on MTV and Logo, hosted by Laverne Cox. The hour-long documentary spoke with seven transgender youth about their determination to lead their lives as the people they are meant to be. The film examined the struggles of coming out, bullying, and anti-transgender violence for the youth as well as the intersection of transgender identities and race in their lives. It won the 2014 Daytime Creative Arts Emmy Award for Outstanding Special Class Special and was nominated for the GLAAD Media Award for Outstanding Documentary. In 2019, Horner executive produced Inside the Internet, exploring how in the past five decades, the internet has changed the very fabric of our society, highlighted by interviews with Martha Stewart, Mark Cuban, Chuck D and the founders of AOL, Craigslist, Friendster, Match, and Tinder.

=== Nominations, awards and co-productions ===
In 2015, Horner was an Executive Producer on Kevin Kerslake's As I Am: The Life and Times of DJ Am, a retrospective look at the life and work of influential electronic music DJ, Adam Goldstein, known as DJ AM.

In 2017, Horner produced Bean, which explored what a casual right swipe on Tinder does, forever changing the lives of two young women who undergo a potentially life-saving transplant surgery. It won Best Documentary Feature at 2017's Big Apple Film Festival in New York, Best of Fest at AmDocs in Palm Springs and was nominated for a 2018 Daytime Emmy Award. Bean is also known as It's A Match internationally. That same year, Horner created the Netflix original series Marching Orders.

In 2018, Horner was series director for Katie Couric's six-part Nat Geo documentary series America Inside Out.

In 2019, Horner directed and produced Parkland Rising, which followed the Parkland high school's students and families who became fierce leaders of a national movement for gun reform in the wake of the shooting of 17 people at Marjory Stoneman Douglas High. Parkland Rising won Best Documentary Feature at the Woodstock Film Festival and Slamdance Miami.

Horner was an executive producer on March, the 2022 CW docuseries which followed a group of college students from Prairie View A&M University's marching band, the Marching Storm, and their journey to become the highest ranked HBCU band, sharing the stories of individual members and staff.

In 2024, Horner executive produced for ABC News, Sins of the Parents: The Crumbley Trials, a documentary about the prosecution of Jennifer and James Crumbley for their role in the 2021 Oxford High School shooting perpetrated by their son, Ethan Crumbley. It was nominated for the 2025 News & Documentary Emmy Award for Outstanding Crime and Justice Coverage and it streamed on HULU.

== Personal ==
Horner has two daughters from her former marriage to Dave Sirulnick. Horner is also known as Cheryl Horner McDonough and Cheryl Sirulnick.

== Filmography ==
YEAR	TITLE	CREDIT	NETWORK	NOTES
2000	Choose or Lose: Gun Fight	Writer	MTV	
	Choose or Lose: Why Care?	Segment Producer	MTV	
	Choose or Lose: Sex Laws	Producer	MTV	
2002	True Life Series	Executive Producer	MTV	Aired from 2002 to 2016, 45 episodes Peabody Award Winner
2006	Fat Camp	Producer	MTV	
	I'm Addicted to Crystal Meth	Director	MTV	Winner, 2007 Prism Awarded
2007	Return to Fat Camp	Producer	MTV	
	I Won't Love You to Death: The Story of Mario and His Mom	Executive Producer	MTV	
	Born Country	Executive Producer	CMT	2 episodes Gigantic! Productions
2009	Ice Queens	Executive Producer	MTV	Gigantic! Productions
	Gone Too Far	Executive Producer	MTV	7 episodes Gigantic! co-produced with ISH Entertainment
2010	Sexting in America: When Privates Go Public	Executive Producer	MTV	Gigantic! Productions
2011	MTV's Top 10 Most Outrageous Sex Myths	Executive Producer	MTV	Gigantic! Productions
	Secretly Pregnant	Executive Producer	MTV	12 episodes Gigantic! Productions
2012	The Break	Executive Producer	MTV	Gigantic! Productions
	Birth Moms	Executive Producer	MTV	Gigantic! Productions
2013	Washington Heights	Executive Producer	MTV	11 episodes Gigantic! Productions
	Thieves, Inc	Executive Producer	MTV	6 episodes Gigantic! Productions
2014	Laverne Cox Presents: The T Word	Executive Producer	Logo	Winner, 2014 Daytime Creative Arts Emmy Award for Outstanding Special Class Special Nominated, GLAAD Media Award for Outstanding Documentary Gigantic! Production
2015	As I AM: The Life and Times of DJ AM	Executive Producer	MTV	Directed by Kevin Kerslake Gigantic! Productions
	Player Gets Played	Executive Producer	MTV	Gigantic! Productions
2016	Bean	Executive Producer	MTV	Known internationally as It's A Match. Nominated, 2018 Daytime Emmy Award Winner, Best Documentary Feature, Big Apple Film Festival Winner, Best of Fest at AmDocs
	Marching Orders	Executive Producer	Netflix	12 Episodes Gigantic! Productions
2018	America Inside Out	Executive Producer	Nat Geo	6 episodes with Katie Couric Gigantic! Productions
2019	Parkland Rising	Executive Producer, Director	Apple TV+	Winner, Best Documentary Feature, Woodstock Film Festival Winner, Slamdance Miami Gigantic! Productions
	Inside the Internet	Executive Producer	Nat Geo	Gigantic! Productions
2022	March	Executive Producer	The CW	Co-production with Stage 13, The CW Network, Gigantic! Productions
2024	Sins of the Parents: The Crumbley Trials	Executive Producer	ABC, Hulu	Nominated, 2025 News & Documentary Emmy Award for Outstanding Crime and Justice Coverage Gigantic! Productions
