= Yaconelli =

Yaconelli is a surname, an Anglicised form of the Italian surname Jaconelli. Notable people with the surname include:

- Frank Yaconelli (1898–1965), American film actor.
- Mike Yaconelli (1942–2003), American writer
