= Pickled oysters =

Traditional way of preserving oysters

Pickled oysters are a traditional way of preserving oysters by pickling or curing. To pickle oysters, they are usually cooked for a short period after removal from the shell, cooled, and placed in glass jars with vinegar and other spices.

== History ==
In 1646, Humphrey Mill described pickled oysters being served to customers in brothels in England. Another early reference to pickled oysters appears in the writings of Samuel Pepys, who wrote about them as early as 1661.

According to Rowan Jacobsen, pickled oysters were "standard fare in every city on the Eastern Seaboard in that heady pre-canning era when oysters were in demand far and wide." Pickled oysters were a popular dish among both the upper and lower classes. Pickled oysters were also served at the Governor’s Palace in Williamsburg, Virginia. In Colonial America, pickled oysters were a commonly traded commodity as a part of the slave trade. The papers of George Washington indicate that he enjoyed pickled oysters in the 1780s and received them as a gift.

In the 1840s and 1850s, Thomas Downing served pickled oysters at his establishment in New York City.

In 1881, U.S. President James A. Garfield's inauguration dinner included over 100 gallons of pickled oysters. Victorian-era cookbooks often include pickled oyster recipes.

Pickled oysters were a frequent holiday staple in American homes of the 1800s.

The 1903 Le guide culinaire includes a pickled oyster preparation. Pickled oysters are still a common staple in Southern cuisine of the United States, and have been a featured recipe by Mashama Bailey and Thomas Keller.

== See also ==
- List of pickled foods
