= Fat camp (disambiguation) =

Fat camp may refer to:

- Weight loss camp, a type of residential retreat where overweight or obese people go to lose weight with exercise and lifestyle changes.
- Fat Camp (South Park)
- Fat Camp: An MTV Docs Movie Presentation
- Fat Camp, the original name of Gigantic (musical)
