= 2002 NCAA Division I women's basketball championship game =

Women's basketball championship game

NCAA Division I women's basketball championship game
National championship game
Oklahoma Sooners	Connecticut Huskies
(32–3)	(38–0)
70	82
Head coach: Sherri Coale	Head coach: Geno Auriemma
- AP: 4
- Coaches: 4
- AP: 1
- Coaches: 1
	1st half	2nd half	Total
Oklahoma Sooners	30	40	70
Connecticut Huskies	42	40	82
- Date: March 31, 2002
- Venue: Alamodome, San Antonio, Texas
- MVP: Swin Cash, Connecticut
- Referees: Scott Yarbrough, Lisa Mattingly, and Melissa Barlow
- Attendance: 29,619

United States TV coverage
- Network: ESPN
- Announcers: Mike Patrick (play-by-play), Ann Meyers (analyst), and Michele Tafoya (sideline)

The 2002 NCAA Division I women's basketball championship game was the final game of the 2002 NCAA Division I women's basketball tournament. It determined the champion of the 2001–02 NCAA Division I women's basketball season and was contested by the Connecticut Huskies and the Oklahoma Sooners. The game was played on March 31, 2002, at the Alamodome in San Antonio, Texas. After leading 42–30 at halftime, No. 1 UConn defeated No. 4 Oklahoma 82–70 to capture the program's third National championship, and complete the fourth unbeaten season in women's NCAA history (Texas, 1986; Connecticut, 1995; Tennessee, 1998). Connecticut's Swin Cash was named the tournament's Most Outstanding Player.

== Participants ==
=== Oklahoma Sooners ===
The Sooners, representing the University of Oklahoma in Norman, Oklahoma, were led by head coach Sherri Coale in her 6th season at the school. Oklahoma began the season ranked No. 4 in the AP Poll. The team's first loss of the season was at No. 1 UConn on December 22. The team won Big 12 regular season (14–2) and tournament titles. The Sooners finished No. 4 in the final AP poll.

Entering the NCAA tournament at 27–3, OU held the No. 1 seed in the West region. They defeated No. 16 seed Hartford, No. 9 seed Villanova, No. 4 seed Texas Tech, and No. 3 seed Colorado to reach the Final Four for the first time in program history. In the National semifinals, the Sooners defeated the No. 1 seed from the East region, No. 3 Duke, 86–71.

=== Connecticut Huskies ===
The Huskies, who represented the University of Connecticut in Storrs, Connecticut, were led by head coach Geno Auriemma, in his 17th season at the school. UConn opened the season ranked No. 1 in the AP poll, and possessed the top spot for the entirety of the season. Connecticut closed out a perfect regular season, including a 16–0 record in the Big East, before winning the Big East tournament to improve to 33–0 overall.

In the NCAA tournament, the No.1 seeded Huskies defeated No. 16 seed St. Francis (PA), No. 9 seed Iowa, No. 4 seed Penn State, and No. 7 seed Old Dominion to reach the sixth NCAA Final Four in program history. They won 79–56 over rival and Midwest region No. 2 seed Tennessee in the national semifinal to reach the national championship game with a 38–0 record.

== Starting lineups ==
Oklahoma	Position		Connecticut
LaNeishea Caufield	G		Sue Bird
Stacey Dales	G		Diana Taurasi
Rosalind Ross	G	F	Asjha Jones
Caton Hill	F		Swin Cash
Jamie Talbert	F		Tamika Williams

== Game summary ==
ESPN

March 31, 2002

No. 1 Oklahoma Sooners 70, No. 1 UConn Huskies 82
Scoring by half: 30–42, 40–40
Pts: Dales 18; Rebs: Hill 8 Asts: Caufield, Hill 4	Pts: Cash 20; Rebs: Cash 13; Asts: Bird, Cash 4

Alamodome – San Antonio, Texas
Attendance: 29,619
Referees: Scott Yarbrough, Lisa Mattingly, and Melissa Barlow

== Media coverage ==
The game was broadcast on ESPN with Mike Patrick on play-by-play duties, Ann Meyers as the color analyst, and Michele Tafoya as the sideline reporter.

== See also ==
2002 NCAA Division I men's basketball championship game
