= Back on My Feet =

Back on My Feet may refer to:

- "Back on My Feet" (Boom Boom Satellites song), 2009
- "Back on My Feet" (Paul McCartney song)
- Back on My Feet (non-profit organization), an American non-profit organization
- "Back on My Feet", song by Status Quo from the album Thirsty Work, 1994
