= Guardians Drum and Bugle Corps =

- Location: McKinney, Texas
- Division: Open Class
- Founded: 2012
- Director: Bill Greenberg
- Website: guardiansyoutharts.org

The Guardians Drum and Bugle Corps is an Open Class competitive junior drum and bugle corps. Based in McKinney, Texas, the Guardians perform in Drum Corps International (DCI) competitions.

== History ==
Johnathan Doerr, a 19-year-old student at Texas Tech University approached his best friend, Isaac Lee, former drum major of the Blue Devils with the idea of a community-based local touring drum corps in the Central Texas area. On October 28, 2012, Doerr founded the Central Texas Drum Corps Initiative in San Marcos, the organization which would become the Guardians Drum and Bugle Corps. A meeting was held in Seguin in December to gauge community support. With 25 people attending, a decision was made to go forward with developing the future performing unit with its base relocated to Seguin.

When, in early 2013, DCI announced the introduction of two new activities for small competitive units, DrumLine Battle and SoundSport, Doerr saw that he could use SoundSport as a means of helping to start the new corps.

The inaugural membership/rehearsal meeting of the Guardians was held in Seguin in March. Fifteen potential members were in attendance. Aid and assistance was soon forthcoming from established drum corps such as Open Class corps Genesis and Legends, Texas' World Class corps the Crossmen, and all-age corps the Vigilantes, as well as music businesses, interested individuals, and DCI. The corps also grew in size, rapidly approaching the SoundSport maximum of 50, with members coming from throughout Texas.

In June, the Guardians Drum and Bugle Corps undertook a short, in-state tour, giving several performances and concluding with a SoundSport exhibition at the DCI Southwestern Championship regional competition at the Alamodome in San Antonio.

Continuing to develop slowly, with an eye focused on the financial bottom line, the Guardians entered DCI Open Class competition in 2014. Fielding a corps of 112 members (56 brass, 16 battery percussion, 12 front ensemble, 24 auxiliary/guard, 4 drum majors), the unit entered only two contests, both in its home state of Texas, at Round Rock (which was rained out) and San Antonio.

In April 2015, the Guardians again relocated, this time to Houston.

In 2016, the corps had a much longer season, including a three-week-long spring training and eight competitions, including both open class and world class finals, as opposed to the previous year's three. In addition, the corps received a sponsorship from System Blue, and as such, got new instruments from them.

In 2018, the Guardians performed at the National Youth Gathering for the Evangelical Lutheran Church in America.

The Guardians re-located to the Dallas–Fort Worth Metroplex in the 2022 season subsequently moved to San Antonio, where they are currently based.

On February 21, 2025, the Guardians announced they would be taking a hiatus and not field a corps for the 2025 season.

== Show summary (2013–26) ==
Key
Light blue background indicates DCI Open Class Finalist
Pale green background indicates DCI World Class Semifinalist

Year	Repertoire	World Championships	
Year	Repertoire	Score	Placement
2013	The Eternal Quest; Apocalyptic (Symphony No. 8) by Anton Bruckner / Symphony No. 2 (Resurrection) by Gustav Mahler / Nimrod (from Enigma Variations) by Edward Elgar / Children's March (Over the Hills and Far Away) by Percy Grainger	Did not attend World Championships	
2014	Terra Nova; Ecstatic Waters by Steven Bryant / Third Symphony, Mvt. 2 Allegro Molto by Aaron Copland / Symphony No. 2 (Resurrection) by Gustav Mahler / Daphnis and Chloé - Scene 3 by Maurice Ravel / Old Hundredth (Doxology) by Loys Bourgeois / Original Music by Daniel Montoya Jr. & Sarah Santa Cruz	Did not attend World Championships	
2015	Light of Gold; Grand Piano Music, Part II: On the Dominant Divide by John Adams / Toccata and Fugue in D Minor by Johann Sebastian Bach / Lux Aurumque by Eric Whitacre / Original Music by Daniel Montoya Jr. & Robbie Green	Did not attend World Championships	
2016	Radioactive; Symphonie Fantastique, Op. 14 by Hector Berlioz / Radioactive by Melvyn Gonzalez, Alexander Grant, Ben McKee. Josh Mosser, Dan Platzman, Dan Reynolds & Wayne Sermon (Imagine Dragons) / Radioactive by Daniel Montoya Jr. & Benjamin Pyles / The Adoration of Veless and Ala (from Scythian Suite) by Sergei Prokofiev / Creep by Thom Yorke, Jonny Greenwood, Colin Greenwood, Ed O'Brien & Phil Selway (Radiohead); Albert Hammond & Mike Hazlewood / Everything In Its Right Place by Thom Yorke (Radiohead) / The National Anthem by Thom Yorke, Colin Greenwood & Phil Selway (Radiohead) / Church Windows, Mvt. II by Ottorino Respighi / Toxic by Cathy Dennis, Christian Karlsson, Pontus Winnberg & Henrik Jonback / Original Music by Daniel Montoya Jr. & Robbie Green	64.450	11th Place; Open Class; Finalist
2016		64.988	32nd Place; World Class
2017	My Beautiful Dark Twisted Fantasy; Dark Fantasy by Kanye West, Robert Diggs (RZA), Ernest Wilson (No I.D.), Jeff Bhasker, Mike Dean, Malik Yusef Jones, Jon Anderson & Mike Oldfield / Power by Kanye West, Larry Griffin, Jr. (Symbolyc One), Dean Bhasker, Andwele Gardner (Dwele), Ken Lewis, Francois Bernheim, Jean-Pierre Lang, Boris Bergman, Robert Fripp, Michael Giles, Greg Lake, Ian McDonald & Peter Sinfield / Heartless by Kanye West, Ernest Wilson, Scott Mescudi (Kid Cudi) & Malik Yusef Jones / All of the Lights by Kanye West, Dean Bhasker, Malik Yusef Jones & Warren Trotter (Really Doe) / Runaway by Kanye West, Terrence Thornton (Pusha T), Emile Haynie, Jeff Bhasker, Mike Dean & John Roger Branch / Symphony in B♭ & Symphonic Metamorphosis of Themes by Carl Maria von Weber by Paul Hindemith, Original Music by Daniel Montoya Jr., Doug Bush & Patricia Islas	69.738	10th Place; Open Class; Finalist
2017		67.838	33rd Place; World Class
2018	Damned; Halo by Ryan Tedder, Evan Bogart & Beyoncé Knowles / Cocoa Butter Kisses by Chancelor Jonathan Bennett (Chance the Rapper) / Sunrise by Donald Glover (Childish Gambino) / Sweatpants by Donald Glover, Ludwig Göransson & Jason Martin (Problem) / Praying by Kesha Sebert, Andrew Joslyn, Ben Abraham & Ryan Lewis / HUMBLE. by Kendrick Lamar Duckworth, Michael Williams (Mike Will Made It & Asheton Hogan / Symphony No. 2 in C Minor (Resurrection) by Gustav Mahler / H•a•m by Shawn Carter (Jay-Z), Kanye West & Lexus Lewis (Lex Luger / No Church In the Wild by James Brown, Shawn Carter, Michael Dean, Christopher Francis (Frank Ocean), Phil Manzanera, Terius Nash (The-Dream), Charles Njapa (88-Keys), Joseph Roach, Kanye West & Gary Wright / Original Music by Daniel Montoya Jr., Doug Bush & Patricia Islas	71.875	7th Place; Open Class; Finalist
2018		71.200	29th Place; World Class
2019	Unpeeled; Palladio by Karl Jenkins / Top Hat, White Tie, and Tails by Irving Berlin / Suit & Tie by Justin Timberlake / Across the Universe by John Lennon / La Valse à Mille Temps by Jacques Brel	73.575	7th Place; Open Class; Finalist
2019	Unpeeled; Palladio by Karl Jenkins / Top Hat, White Tie, and Tails by Irving Berlin / Suit & Tie by Justin Timberlake / Across the Universe by John Lennon / La Valse à Mille Temps by Jacques Brel	70.975	29th Place; World Class
2020	Season canceled due to the COVID-19 pandemic		
2021	Contrary; Theme from The Phantom of the Opera by Andrew Lloyd Webber / Back That Azz Up by Juvenile / Careless Whisper by George Michael & Andrew Ridgely (Wham!) / Work It by Missy Elliott / Original Music by Ben Hylton, Matt Penland, & Tyler Sammons	No scored competitions	
2022	From Scratch... Turning Tables by Adele / Total Eclipse of the Heart by Bonnie Tyler / Y'all Get Back Now by Big Freedia / Original Music by Ben Hylton, Matt Penland & Tyler Sammons	79.213	5th Place; Open Class; Finalist
2022	From Scratch... Turning Tables by Adele / Total Eclipse of the Heart by Bonnie Tyler / Y'all Get Back Now by Big Freedia / Original Music by Ben Hylton, Matt Penland & Tyler Sammons	73.925	24th Place; World Class; Semifinalist
2023	i know the end. Sound & Color by Alabama Shakes / X. Adjuah (I Own The Night) by Chief Xian aTunde Adjuah (Christian Scott) / Everything in its Right Place by Radiohead / Welcome to the Black Parade by My Chemical Romance / Original Music by Ben Hylton, Matt Penland & Tyler Sammons	72.688	6th Place; Open Class; Finalist
2023	i know the end. Sound & Color by Alabama Shakes / X. Adjuah (I Own The Night) by Chief Xian aTunde Adjuah (Christian Scott) / Everything in its Right Place by Radiohead / Welcome to the Black Parade by My Chemical Romance / Original Music by Ben Hylton, Matt Penland & Tyler Sammons	74.575	27th Place; World Class
2024	Going Places; Clutch by Andrew David Perkins / Like Kids (from Cirque du Soleil's “Volta”) by M83 / The Beating of our Hearts (from The Symphony of Us) by Pinar Toprak / What You Mean to Me (from Finding Neverland) by Scott Frankel	Did not attend World Championships	
2025	Corps Inactive		
2026	Welcome To Texas; The Big County Main Theme by Jerome Moross / The Magnificent Seven Main Theme by Elmer Bernstein / Cowboy Take me Away by The Chicks / Texas! by Charlie Daniels / William Tell Overture by Gioachino Rossini	Did not attend World Championships	
