= Brian Lukacher =

American art historian

- Born: York, Pennsylvania, United States
- Occupations: Art historian Educator
- Spouse: Joanne Martin

Academic background
- Education: New College of Florida; Williams College; University of Delaware
- Thesis: Joseph Michael Gandy: The Poetical Representation and Mythography of Architecture (1987)
- Doctoral advisor: Damie Stillman

Academic work
- Discipline: Art history
- Sub-discipline: British art
- Institutions: Bowdoin College; Vassar College

Brian Lukacher is an American art historian and educator. Lukacher is currently Professor of Art History at Vassar College.

== Career ==
A native of York, Lukacher received three degrees in Art History: a Bachelor of Arts from the New College of Florida in 1977, a Master of Arts from Williams College, and a Doctor of Philosophy from the University of Delaware in 1987. His college thesis was titled "Human Experience and Visionary Landscapes in English Romantic Art," and his doctoral dissertation was on the architecture of Joseph Gandy, who Lukacher continued to study. The latter was completed under the supervision of Damie Stillman.

During the 1984 to 1985 academic year, Lukacher taught as an instructor of art history at Bowdoin College. He has taught at Vassar College since 1986, rising through the ranks to Professor of Art History. He is a scholar of British art, focusing on aesthetics and social history from the late eighteenth through nineteenth century.

Lukacher resides in Poughkeepsie and lives with his wife, Joanne Martin, who is a fellow art historian.

== Selected works ==
- Joseph Michael Gandy, 1771-1843, 1982 ISBN 978-0904503227
- Joseph Gandy in the Shadow of the Enlightenment, 2002 ISBN 978-0954228415
- Joseph Gandy: An Architectural Visionary in Georgian England, 2006 ISBN 978-0500342213

== See also ==
- List of Bowdoin College people
- List of people from York, Pennsylvania
- List of New College of Florida alumni
- List of University of Delaware people
- List of Vassar College people
- List of Williams College people
