= 2001–02 Connecticut Huskies women's basketball team =

Intercollegiate basketball season

2001–02 Connecticut Huskies women's basketball

NCAA Tournament, National Champions Big East Tournament champions Big East regular season champions Pre-Season WNIT champions

National Championship Game, W 82–70 vs. Oklahoma
- Conference: Big East Conference

Ranking
- Coaches: No. 1
- AP: No. 1
- Record: 39–0 (16–0 Big East)
- Head coach: Geno Auriemma (17th season)
- Associate head coach: Chris Dailey (17th season)
- Assistant coaches: Tonya Cardoza (8th season); Jamelle Elliott (5th season)
- Home arena: Harry A. Gampel Pavilion

2001–02 Big East Conference women's basketball standings
| | Conf. | | | | Overall |
| Team | W | | L | PCT | W | | L | PCT |
|---|---|---|---|---|---|---|---|---|
| No. 1 Connecticut † | 16 | – | 0 | 1.000 | 39 | – | 0 | 1.000 |
| Notre Dame | 13 | – | 3 | .813 | 20 | – | 10 | .667 |
| No. 21 Boston College | 12 | – | 4 | .750 | 23 | – | 8 | .742 |
| Villanova | 12 | – | 4 | .750 | 20 | – | 11 | .645 |
| Miami (FL) | 10 | – | 6 | .625 | 19 | – | 12 | .613 |
| Virginia Tech | 9 | – | 7 | .563 | 21 | – | 11 | .656 |
| Syracuse | 9 | – | 7 | .563 | 18 | – | 13 | .581 |
| Providence | 7 | – | 9 | .438 | 13 | – | 15 | .464 |
| Seton Hall | 6 | – | 10 | .375 | 15 | – | 14 | .517 |
| West Virginia | 6 | – | 10 | .375 | 14 | – | 14 | .500 |
| Rutgers | 5 | – | 11 | .313 | 9 | – | 20 | .310 |
| Georgetown | 4 | – | 12 | .250 | 12 | – | 16 | .429 |
| Pittsburgh | 3 | – | 13 | .188 | 8 | – | 19 | .296 |
| St. John's | 0 | – | 16 | .000 | 3 | – | 24 | .111 |
† 2002 Big East Tournament winner As of April 1, 2002; Rankings from AP poll

The 2001–02 Connecticut Huskies women's basketball team represented the University of Connecticut in the 2001–2002 NCAA Division I basketball season. Coached by Geno Auriemma, the Huskies played their home games at the Hartford Civic Center in Hartford, Connecticut, and on campus at the Harry A. Gampel Pavilion in Storrs, Connecticut, and are a member of the Big East Conference. At the Big East women's basketball tournament, the Huskies won the championship by defeating Boston College 96–54. The Huskies won their third NCAA championship by defeating the Oklahoma Sooners, 82–70. The starting five of Sue Bird, Swin Cash, Asjha Jones, Tamika Williams, and Diana Taurasi are generally considered the greatest starting lineup in Women's College Basketball history.

On December 29, 2011, the team was recognized as one of the greatest in the program's history by induction into the Huskies of Honor.

== Roster changes ==
Five players from the 2000–01 team (Shea Ralph, Svetlana Abrosimova, Kelly Schumacher, Christine Rigby, and Marci Czel) were seniors and are no longer part of the team. One sophomore player, Kennitra Johnson, decided to leave UConn to be closer to her mother, and transferred to Purdue. Two freshmen joined the team: Ashley Valley, younger sister of Morgan Valley, and Stacey Marron. Although Marron had received scholarship offers from other schools, she chose to apply to UConn and attempt to make the team as a walk-on. She succeeded, and eventually earned a full scholarship, the first Connecticut walk-on to earn a basketball scholarship.

Two other players were not new to the program, but 2001–2002 was their first full season. Ashley Battle was a freshman in the prior year, but sustained an elbow injury in the fifth game of the season, and did not play the remainder of the season. Battle applied for a medical hardship, often called a redshirt. Jessica Moore also joined the team in the prior year, but elected not to play her first year.

== Roster ==
2001–02 Connecticut Huskies women's basketball team
Players
Coaches

| Pos. | # | Name | Height | Year | Previous school | Hometown |
|---|---|---|---|---|---|---|
| G | 2 | Ashley Valley | 5 ft 9 in (1.75 m) | Fr | Rice Memorial | Colchester, Vermont |
| G/F | 3 | Diana Taurasi | 6 ft 0 in (1.83 m) | So | Don Lugo | Chino, California |
| G | 5 | Maria Conlon | 5 ft 9 in (1.75 m) | So | Seymour | Derby, Connecticut |
| G | 10 | Sue Bird (C) | 5 ft 9 in (1.75 m) | Sr | Christ the King | Syosset, New York |
| G | 12 | Stacey Marron | 5 ft 9 in (1.75 m) | Fr | La Cueva | Albuquerque, New Mexico |
| F/C | 15 | Asjha Jones | 6 ft 2 in (1.88 m) | Sr | Piscataway | Piscataway, New Jersey |
| G | 20 | Morgan Valley | 6 ft 0 in (1.83 m) | So | Rice Memorial | Colchester, Vermont |
| F | 22 | Ashley Battle | 6 ft 0 in (1.83 m) | RS Fr | The Linsly School, WVA | Pittsburgh, Pennsylvania |
| C | 31 | Jessica Moore | 6 ft 3 in (1.91 m) | RS Fr | Colony | Palmer, Alaska |
| F | 32 | Swin Cash (C) | 6 ft 2 in (1.88 m) | Sr | McKeesport | McKeesport, Pennsylvania |
| F | 34 | Tamika Williams | 6 ft 2 in (1.88 m) | Sr | Chaminade-Julienne | Dayton, Ohio |

Head coach

Geno Auriemma

Assistant coach(es)

Chris Dailey
Tonya Cardoza
Jamelle Elliott

Legend

- (C) Team captain
- (S) Suspended
- (I) Ineligible
- (W) Walk-on
- Injured
- Current redshirt

Roster
Last update: 2013-08-23

== Schedule and results ==
| Date time, TV | Rank^{#} | Opponent^{#} | Result | Record | High points | High rebounds | High assists | Site city, state |
Non-conference regular season
| November 9, 2001*; 7:30 pm, CPTV | No. 1 | Fairfield; Pre-Season WNIT – Round 1 | W 93–50 | 1–0 | 21 – Bird | 10 – Cash | 12 – Bird | Gampel Pavilion (10,027); Storrs, Connecticut |
| November 11, 2001*; 2:00 pm, CPTV | No. 1 | Florida International; Pre-Season WNIT – Round 2 | W 91–47 | 2–0 | 21 – Taurasi | 9 – Jones | 7 – Bird | Gampel Pavilion (10,027); Storrs, Connecticut |
| November 15, 2001*; 7:30 pm, CPTV | No. 1 | North Carolina; Pre-Season WNIT – Semifinals | W 94–74 | 3–0 | 20 – Bird | 19 – Williams | 6 – Taurasi | Gampel Pavilion (10,027); Storrs, Connecticut |
| November 18, 2001*; 5:00 pm, CPTV | No. 1 | No. 3 Vanderbilt; Pre-Season WNIT – Championship Game | W 69–50 | 4–0 | 19 – Cash | 10 – Cash | 5 – Tied | Gampel Pavilion (10,027); Storrs, Connecticut |
| November 24, 2001*; 1:00 pm, CPTV | No. 1 | Rhode Island | W 84–38 | 5–0 | 17 – Jones | 10 – Cash | 6 – Bird | Hartford Civic Center (16,294); Hartford, Connecticut |
| November 26, 2001*; 7:00 pm, CPTV | No. 1 | at Wake Forest | W 88–38 | 6–0 | 14 – Tied | 9 – Cash | 7 – Bird | LJVM Coliseum (1,137); Winston-Salem, North Carolina |
| November 30, 2001*; 7:30 pm, CPTV | No. 1 | Ball State | W 103–69 | 7–0 | 19 – Jones | 11 – Moore | 12 – Taurasi | Gampel Pavilion (10,027); Storrs, Connecticut |
| December 4, 2001; 7:30 pm, CPTV | No. 1 | St. John's | W 88–28 | 8–0 (1–0) | 15 – Taurasi | 9 – Cash | 9 – Bird | Gampel Pavilion (10,027); Storrs, Connecticut |
| December 6, 2001*; 7:30 pm, CPTV | No. 1 | Holy Cross | W 97–54 | 9–0 | 25 – Bird | 9 – Williams | 5 – Bird | Hartford Civic Center (16,294); Hartford, Connecticut |
| December 9, 2001*; 4:30 pm, ESPN2 | No. 1 | No. 8 Louisiana Tech | W 74–50 | 10–0 | 24 – Taurasi | 10 – Williams | 6 – Bird | Hartford Civic Center (16,294); Hartford, Connecticut |
| December 22, 2001*; 2:00 pm, ESPN2 | No. 1 | No. 3 Oklahoma | W 86–72 | 11–0 | 21 – Bird | 18 – Jones | 7 – Cash | Hartford Civic Center (16,294); Hartford, Connecticut |
| December 27, 2001*; 7:30 pm, CPTV | No. 1 | Cal State Northridge | W 101–44 | 12–0 | 21 – Moore | 15 – Cash | 8 – Bird | Gampel Pavilion (10,027); Storrs, Connecticut |
| December 29, 2001*; 2:00 pm, CPTV | No. 1 | at No. 23 Old Dominion | W 84–70 | 13–0 | 29 – Cash | 12 – Cash | 8 – Bird | Ted Constant Convocation Center (5,236); Norfolk, Virginia |
| December 31, 2001*; 2:00 pm, CPTV | No. 1 | at Wright State | W 97–39 | 14–0 | 20 – Tied | 8 – Williams | 8 – Taurasi | Nutter Center (4,762); Dayton, Ohio |
Big East Regular Season
| January 2, 2002; 8:00 pm, CPTV | No. 1 | Pittsburgh | W 112–43 | 15–0 (2–0) | 19 – Cash | 10 – Cash | 7 – Taurasi | Gampel Pavilion (10,027); Storrs, Connecticut |
| January 5, 2002*; 4:00 pm, CBS | No. 1 | at No. 2 Tennessee | W 86–72 | 16–0 | 32 – Taurasi | 15 – Williams | 8 – Bird | Thompson–Boling Arena (24,611); Knoxville, Tennessee |
| January 9, 2002; 7:30 pm, CPTV | No. 1 | at St. John's | W 84–43 | 17–0 (3–0) | 17 – Bird | 9 – Cash | 6 – Bird | Alumni Hall (2,014); Queens, New York |
| January 12, 2002; 1:00 pm, CPTV | No. 1 | Miami (FL) | W 96–50 | 18–0 (4–0) | 17 – Tied | 15 – Cash | 8 – Bird | Hartford Civic Center (16,294); Hartford, Connecticut |
| January 15, 2002; 8:00 pm, CPTV | No. 1 | at Georgetown | W 85–41 | 19–0 (5–0) | 18 – Cash | 10 – Cash | 8 – Bird | McDonough Gymnasium (2,146); Washington, D.C. |
| January 19, 2002; 12:00 pm, CPTV | No. 1 | at Villanova | W 93–60 | 20–0 (6–0) | 19 – Jones | 9 – Jones | 8 – Bird | Finneran Pavilion (5,127); Villanova, Pennsylvania |
| January 21, 2002; 3:00 pm, ESPN | No. 1 | Notre Dame | W 80–53 | 21–0 (7–0) | 17 – Williams | 11 – Williams | 6 – Tied | Hartford Civic Center (16,294); Hartford, Connecticut |
| January 26, 2002; 7:30 pm, CPTV | No. 1 | No. 24 Boston College | W 79–56 | 22–0 (8–0) | 23 – Bird | 13 – Jones | 7 – Battle | Gampel Pavilion (10,027); Storrs, Connecticut |
| January 29, 2002; 7:00 pm, CPTV | No. 1 | at No. 23 Virginia Tech | W 59–50 | 23–0 (9–0) | 19 – Jones | 8 – Jones | 2 – Taurasi | Cassell Coliseum (6,069); Blacksburg, Virginia |
| February 3, 2002; 12:05 pm, BETV | No. 1 | at Providence | W 85–61 | 24–0 (10–0) | 20 – Taurasi | 7 – Cash | 6 – Cash | Alumni Hall (2,574); Providence, Rhode Island |
| February 6, 2002; 7:30 pm, CPTV | No. 1 | Seton Hall | W 92–40 | 25–0 (11–0) | 17 – Jones | 12 – Cash | 7 – Bird | Gampel Pavilion (10,027); Storrs, Connecticut |
| February 10, 2002; 2:00 pm, CPTV | No. 1 | No. 23 Virginia Tech | W 77–42 | 26–0 (12–0) | 15 – Williams | 6 – Cash | 6 – Bird | Gampel Pavilion (10,027); Storrs, Connecticut |
| February 13, 2002; 7:00 pm, CPTV | No. 1 | at Syracuse | W 85–55 | 27–0 (13–0) | 24 – Taurasi | 8 – Cash | 8 – Taurasi | Manley Field House (3,328); Syracuse, New York |
| February 20, 2002; 7:30 pm, CPTV | No. 1 | Providence | W 106–41 | 28–0 (14–0) | 20 – Taurasi | 8 – Bird | 7 – Taurasi | Gampel Pavilion (10,027); Storrs, Connecticut |
| February 23, 2002; 2:00 pm, CPTV | No. 1 | at Rutgers | W 80–42 | 29–0 (15–0) | 18 – Cash | 8 – Cash | 4 – Taurasi | Louis Brown Athletic Center (7,223); Piscataway, New Jersey |
| February 26, 2002; 7:00 pm, CPTV | No. 1 | at West Virginia | W 89–60 | 30–0 (16–0) | 17 – Jones | 13 – Cash | 8 – Taurasi | WVU Coliseum (1,394); Morgantown, West Virginia |
Big East Tournament
| March 3, 2002; 2:00 pm, CPTV | (1) No. 1 | vs. (9) Seton Hall; Quarterfinals | W 78–48 | 31–0 | 16 – Jones | 11 – Cash | 8 – Bird | Louis Brown Athletic Center (5,332); Piscataway, New Jersey |
| March 4, 2002*; 6:00 pm, BETV | (1) No. 1 | vs. (4) Villanova; Semifinals | W 83–39 | 32–0 | 23 – Taurasi | 7 – Jones | 5 – Tied | Louis Brown Athletic Center (3,533); Piscataway, New Jersey |
| March 5, 2002*; 7:30 pm, ESPN2 | (1) No. 1 | vs. (3) No. 20 Boston College; Championship Game | W 96–54 | 33–0 | 19 – Jones | 11 – Jones | 7 – Bird | Louis Brown Athletic Center (4,278); Piscataway, New Jersey |
NCAA Tournament
| March 16, 2002*; 1:30 pm, CPTV | (1 ME) No. 1 | (16 ME) St. Francis (PA); First Round | W 86–37 | 34–0 | 18 – Jones | 11 – Cash | 7 – Taurasi | Gampel Pavilion (10,027); Storrs, Connecticut |
| March 17, 2002*; 9:00 pm, ESPN | (1 ME) No. 1 | (9 ME) Iowa; Second Round | W 86–48 | 35–0 | 22 – Bird | 9 – Tied | 5 – Calhoun | Gampel Pavilion (10,027); Storrs, Connecticut |
| March 23, 2002*; 12:00 pm, ESPN2 | (1 ME) No. 1 | (4 ME) No. 24 Penn State; Sweet Sixteen | W 82–64 | 36–0 | 24 – Bird | 12 – Williams | 8 – Taurasi | U.S. Cellular Arena (7,123); Milwaukee, Wisconsin |
| March 25, 2002*; 7:37 pm, ESPN2 | (1 ME) No. 1 | vs. (7 ME) No. 15 Old Dominion; Elite Eight | W 85–64 | 37–0 | 26 – Bird | 7 – Jones | 11 – Bird | U.S. Cellular Arena (6,997); Milwaukee, Wisconsin |
| March 29, 2002*; 9:34 pm, ESPN | (1 ME) No. 1 | (2 MW) No. 6 Tennessee; Final Four | W 79–56 | 38–0 | 18 – Tied | 10 – Tied | 6 – Cash | Alamodome (29,619); San Antonio, Texas |
| March 31, 2002*; 8:30 pm, ESPN | (1 ME) No. 1 | vs. (1 W) No. 4 Oklahoma; National Championship Game | W 82–70 | 39–0 | 20 – Cash | 13 – Cash | 4 – Tied | Alamodome (29,619); San Antonio, Texas |
*Non-conference game. ^{#}Rankings from AP Poll. (#) Tournament seedings in parentheses. All times are in Eastern Time. ME = Mid-East, MW = Mid-West, W = West.

== Team players drafted in the 2002 WNBA draft ==
| Round | Pick | Player | WNBA club |
|---|---|---|---|
| 1 | 1 | Sue Bird | Seattle Storm |
| 1 | 2 | Swin Cash | Detroit Shock |
| 1 | 4 | Asjha Jones | Washington Mystics |
| 1 | 6 | Tamika Williams | Minnesota Lynx |

Additionally, Diana Taurasi was also the first overall pick in the 2004 WNBA draft. In the 2005 WNBA draft, Jessica Moore was selected 24th overall, and Ashley Battle was selected 25th overall.

== Awards and honors ==
- Sue Bird, Naismith Award
- Sue Bird, Wade Trophy
- Sue Bird, Nancy Lieberman Award
- Sue Bird, Lowe's Senior CLASS Award
- Sue Bird Sportswoman of the Year Award
- Sue Bird Big East Conference Women's Basketball Player of the Year
- Sue Bird Honda Sports Award, basketball
- Swin Cash, Tournament Most Outstanding Player
- Asjha Jones, Most Outstanding Player, Big East women's basketball tournament
- Geno Auriemma Naismith College Coach of the Year
- Geno Auriemma WBCA National Coach of the Year
