= Agape (Christian rapper) =

American rapper and musician

- Also known as: AGAPE*
- Born: Dave Scherer
- Origin: Minneapolis, Minnesota
- Genres: Christian contemporary, pop, R&B, pop rap
- Years active: 2000–present
- Website: Hip Hop Outreach

Dave Scherer, better known by his stage name Agape, is an American rapper and musician. He has been touring full-time since 2000, performing in the United States and in six other countries. He has recorded six CDs, including Many Rooms with producer Ant (Atmosphere, Brother Ali). On his recent CD Rise Up he worked with Chris Brown's producer Ra Charm as well as Grammy-award-winning singer Billy Steele (Sounds of Blackness, The Steeles). He has performed in front of Archbishop Desmond Tutu, Toby Mac, David Crowder, Tony Campolo, and gospel singer Kirk Franklin. In 2001, he co-founded "JUMP" (Joint Urban Ministries in Praise), a ministry dedicated to helping urban youth unleash their leadership skills through the arts. In 2009, he received the Tom Hunstad Award for excellence in youth ministry and his contribution to the lives of young people.

== Career highlights ==
- Has sold over 30,000 CDs independently
- Performed for 40,000 youth at the New Orleans Superdome in 2009,2012,2015 and 2018 for the ELCA Youth Gathering
- Toured extensively in Bosnia on a mission of hope and reconciliation
- Helped launch AMP (All-Metro Praise) in 2012, a service designed to bring together young people of all backgrounds
- 2009 "Jesus, Justice, Jazz" tour raised money (over $50,000) and awareness for world hunger.
- Won 2009 Tom Hunstad award for youth ministry (previous winners include Mike Yaconelli and Rollie Martinson)
- Single "Keepin It Tight" was peaked at number 3 on mp3.com chart
- Performer at National Youth Gatherings of UMC, ELCA, Community of Christ and LCMS, Lutheran Brethren
- Speaker at National Youthworkers Convention in Atlanta, Georgia and Western States Gathering in Seattle, Washington
- Facilitator of Leadership Development Intensive Training
- Chairman of Building Bridges Conference for Diversity
- Co-leader of Fellowship of Christian Athletes
- Youth director at Mt. Olivet Lutheran Church in Minneapolis, Minnesota
- Artist in residence at Ramsey Fine Arts School in Minneapolis, Minnesota
- Teacher at Urban Academy in Minneapolis, Minnesota
- Mentor at First Lutheran Church in St. Peter, Minnesota
- Member of an award-winning peer education group
- President of Multicultural Student Union
- Co-founder of JUMP ministries (Joint Urban Ministries in Praise)
- Founder of Hip Hop Outreach
- Recipient of the Tom Hunstad award for excellence in youth ministry

=== Concerts ===
- 2014: MSYG (Middle School Youth Gathering) Colorado Springs
- 2009: ELCA Youth Gathering in New Orleans
- 2012: ELCA Youth Gathering in New Orleans
- 2015: ELCA Detroit Youth Gathering where approximately 30,000 youth attended

== Discography ==
=== Albums ===
Year	Album
1998	Keepin' It Tight
2000	Bridge The Gap
2002	Many Rooms
2004	Agapé featuring: Jump Worship
2006	Sprinkle Sunshine
2008	Paradoxology
2011	Rise Up
2015	Enough

=== Music Videos ===
- "All Are Welcome"
