= 2001–02 NCAA Division I women's basketball rankings =

- Season: 2001–02
- NCAA Tournament: 2002
- Preseason No. 1: Connecticut
- NCAA Tournament Champions: Connecticut
NCAA Division I women's basketball rankings


Two human polls comprise the 2001–02 NCAA Division I women's basketball rankings, the AP Poll and the Coaches Poll, in addition to various publications' preseason polls. The AP poll is currently a poll of sportswriters, while the USA Today Coaches' Poll is a poll of college coaches. The AP conducts polls weekly through the end of the regular season and conference play, while the Coaches poll conducts a final, post-NCAA tournament poll as well.

== Legend ==
–	No votes
(#)	Ranking

== AP Poll ==
Team	12-Nov	19-Nov	26-Nov	3-Dec	10-Dec	17-Dec	24-Dec	31-Dec	7-Jan	14-Jan	21-Jan	28-Jan	4-Feb	11-Feb	18-Feb	25-Feb	4-Mar	11-Mar
UConn	1	1	1	1	1	1	1	1	1	1	1	1	1	1	1	1	1	1
Oklahoma	4	3	3	3	3	3	4	3	3	3	4	4	4	4	3	5	4	2
Duke	5	9	14	11	8	8	9	11	7	6	5	5	5	5	5	4	3	3
Vanderbilt	3	4	4	4	4	4	3	6	8	7	6	8	6	6	6	6	5	4
Stanford	9	7	7	T5	6	6	6	5	4	4	3	3	2	2	2	2	2	5
Tennessee	2	2	2	2	2	2	2	2	2	2	2	2	3	3	4	3	6	6
Baylor	14	13	12	9	9	9	8	7	12	13	15	10	10	11	9	8	7	7
Louisiana Tech	6	5	6	8	11	11	11	13	11	10	8	6	8	8	7	9	8	8
Purdue	11	11	10	7	7	7	7	10	13	11	10	7	7	7	8	7	9	9
Iowa St.	8	6	5	T5	5	5	5	4	6	14	14	16	12	10	13	10	11	10
Kansas St.	–	–	–	–	–	–	–	–	14	9	11	9	11	12	12	14	13	11
Colorado	12	14	11	15	13	13	18	16	21	22	20	17	13	13	11	11	10	12
South Carolina	–	–	25	23	23	23	17	14	9	8	7	11	9	9	10	12	14	13
Texas	–	–	21	17	19	19	22	21	16	12	13	14	17	18	15	13	12	14
Old Dominion	18	17	17	25	24	24	23	24	–	24	25	21	20	19	18	16	15	15
North Carolina	–	–	24	18	17	17	20	19	17	17	21	24	24	20	19	19	16	16
Texas Tech	7	8	9	14	12	12	13	9	10	15	12	13	15	16	17	15	17	17
Minnesota	–	–	–	–	–	–	–	–	–	–	23	22	18	15	14	17	19	18
Cincinnati	–	–	–	–	–	–	–	25	–	–	–	–	–	–	25	23	21	19
Colorado St.	24	20	15	12	18	18	15	20	23	20	19	18	19	17	20	20	18	20
Boston College	–	–	–	–	–	–	–	–	25	25	24	20	16	21	21	18	20	21
LSU	–	–	18	21	21	21	21	23	24	–	–	–	–	–	–	–	22	22
FIU	–	–	–	–	–	–	–	–	–	–	–	–	–	–	–	–	25	23
Arizona St.	22	21	–	–	–	–	–	–	–	23	–	–	–	–	–	–	–	–
Auburn	–	–	–	–	25	25	19	17	19	19	22	25	–	–	–	–	–	–
Drake	–	–	–	24	–	–	–	–	–	–	–	–	–	–	–	–	–	–
George Washington	20	18	22	–	–	–	–	–	–	–	–	–	–	–	–	–	–	–
Georgia	16	16	13	13	10	10	10	8	15	16	17	19	22	24	23	24	–	–
Maryland	23	22	–	–	–	–	–	–	–	–	–	–	–	–	–	–	–	–
Michigan	17	19	16	16	14	14	12	18	22	–	–	–	–	–	–	–	–	–
Mississippi St.	–	–	–	–	–	–	–	–	–	–	–	–	25	–	–	–	–	–
North Carolina St.	10	10	8	10	16	16	–	–	–	–	–	–	–	–	–	–	–	–
Notre Dame	15	15	23	–	–	–	–	–	–	–	–	–	–	23	22	21	–	–
TCU	–	–	–	–	–	–	–	–	–	–	–	–	–	–	–	25	–	–
Toledo	–	24	–	–	–	–	–	–	–	–	–	–	–	–	–	–	–	–
Tulane	–	–	–	–	22	22	25	22	20	–	–	–	–	–	–	–	–	–
Utah	25	–	–	–	–	–	–	–	–	–	–	–	–	–	–	–	–	–
Virginia Tech	–	–	–	–	–	–	–	–	–	21	16	23	23	22	24	–	–	–
Washington	19	25	–	–	–	–	–	–	–	–	–	–	–	–	–	–	–	–
Wisconsin	–	23	20	19	15	15	14	12	5	5	9	15	21	25	–	–	–	–
Florida	13	12	19	20	20	20	16	15	18	18	18	12	14	14	16	22	24	T24
Penn St.	21	–	–	22	–	–	24	–	–	–	–	–	–	–	–	–	23	T24

== USA Today Coaches poll ==
Team	5-Nov	12-Nov	19-Nov	26-Nov	3-Dec	10-Dec	17-Dec	24-Dec	31-Dec	7-Jan	14-Jan	21-Jan	28-Jan	4-Feb	11-Feb	18-Feb	25-Feb	4-Mar	11-Mar	1-Apr
UConn	1	1	1	1	1	1	1	1	1	1	1	1	1	1	1	1	1	1	1	1
Oklahoma	5	5	4	4	4	4	4	5	3	2	2	4	4	3	3	3	5	4	2	2
Tennessee	2	2	2	2	2	2	2	2	2	3	3	2	2	4	4	4	3	6	6	3
Duke	4	4	7	12	9	8	8	9	10	7	6	6	5	5	5	5	4	3	3	4
Vanderbilt	3	3	3	3	3	3	3	3	5	6	5	5	6	6	6	7	6	5	4	5
South Carolina	–	–	–	–	–	24	24	18	15	10	8	7	9	9	9	10	11	13	13	6
Old Dominion	18	18	T16	19	23	T25	T25	–	–	–	–	–	–	25	23	21	19	16	15	7
Kansas St.	–	–	–	–	–	–	–	–	–	18	15	15	10	T10	12	12	14	12	11	10
North Carolina	–	–	–	24	20	17	17	19	18	16	17	20	22	23	22	20	21	18	16	11
Texas Tech	7	8	9	8	12	14	14	13	11	12	16	13	16	17	16	17	15	17	17	12
Texas	–	–	–	20	17	18	18	21	20	17	12	12	14	15	17	14	13	14	14	13
Purdue	9	10	11	11	8	7	7	7	9	14	13	11	8	8	8	9	7	9	T8	14
Baylor	16	16	T16	14	13	11	11	10	8	11	11	14	11	12	11	8	8	7	7	15
Iowa St.	8	7	6	6	6	6	6	4	4	5	9	10	12	T10	10	11	10	10	10	16
BYU	–	–	–	–	–	–	–	–	–	–	–	–	–	–	–	–	–	–	–	17
Penn St.	19	19	23	22	21	23	23	24	25	–	–	–	–	–	–	–	–	–	–	18
Louisiana Tech	6	6	5	5	7	10	10	11	12	13	10	9	7	7	7	6	9	8	T8	19
Drake	–	–	–	–	–	–	–	–	–	–	–	–	–	–	–	–	–	–	–	20
Minnesota	–	–	–	–	–	–	–	–	–	–	–	25	24	22	18	19	20	22	22	21
LSU	21	21	19	15	19	21	21	22	24	–	25	24	25	–	–	–	–	23	24	22
Cincinnati	–	–	–	–	–	–	–	–	23	25	–	–	–	–	25	23	22	20	19	23
Colorado St.	25	25	22	16	15	16	16	16	19	23	21	21	19	19	15	16	16	15	18	24
TCU	–	–	–	–	–	–	–	–	–	–	–	–	–	24	–	–	23	25	25	25
Arizona St.	–	–	25	–	–	–	–	–	–	–	–	–	–	–	–	–	–	–	–	–
Auburn	–	–	–	–	–	–	–	20	21	22	22	22	23	–	–	–	–	–	–	–
Boston College	–	–	–	–	–	–	–	–	–	–	–	23	21	18	20	18	T17	19	20	–
FIU	–	–	–	–	–	–	–	–	–	–	–	–	–	–	–	–	–	24	23	–
Florida	12	13	13	18	18	20	20	17	16	15	18	18	15	14	14	15	T17	21	21	–
Florida St.	–	–	–	–	–	T25	T25	–	–	–	–	–	–	–	–	–	–	–	–	–
George Washington	22	22	20	21	24	–	–	–	–	–	–	–	–	–	–	–	–	–	–	–
Georgia	15	15	14	13	11	9	9	8	7	8	14	16	18	21	24	22	24	–	–	–
Maryland	–	–	24	25	–	–	–	–	–	–	–	–	–	–	–	–	–	–	–	–
Michigan	20	20	18	17	16	15	15	12	17	20	T23	–	–	–	–	–	–	–	–	–
Mississippi St.	–	–	–	–	–	–	–	–	–	–	–	–	–	–	–	–	–	–	–	–
North Carolina St.	11	11	10	9	10	13	13	25	–	–	–	–	–	–	–	–	–	–	–	–
Notre Dame	14	14	15	23	–	–	–	–	–	–	–	–	–	–	–	–	25	–	–	–
Rutgers	23	23	–	–	–	–	–	–	–	–	–	–	–	–	–	–	–	–	–	–
Toledo	–	–	–	–	–	–	–	–	–	–	–	–	–	–	–	–	–	–	–	–
Tulane	–	–	–	–	25	22	22	23	22	21	T23	–	–	–	–	–	–	–	–	–
Utah	24	24	–	–	–	–	–	–	–	–	–	–	–	–	–	–	–	–	–	–
Virginia Tech	–	–	–	–	–	–	–	–	–	24	20	17	20	20	21	24	–	–	–	–
Washington	17	17	21	–	–	–	–	–	–	–	–	–	–	–	–	–	–	–	–	–
Wisconsin	–	–	–	–	22	19	19	14	13	9	7	8	13	16	19	25	–	–	–	–
Colorado	13	12	12	10	14	12	12	15	14	19	19	19	17	13	13	13	12	11	12	T8
Stanford	10	9	8	7	5	5	5	6	6	4	4	3	3	2	2	2	2	2	5	T8
