= Ernesto Jaconelli =

Scottish piano accordion player

- Also known as: The Wonder Boy Accordionist with Lightning Fingers
- Born: December 16, 1917; Townhead, Glasgow, Scotland
- Died: Scarborough, North Yorkshire, England
- Genres: Music hall, popular
- Occupation: Teacher
- Instrument: Accordion
- Years active: 1930s–1940s
- Labels: Decca; Imperial; Great Scott
- Formerly of: Stars in Battledress

Ernesto Jaconelli (16 December 1917 – September 1999) was a childhood piano accordion player during the 1930s, nationally known as "The Wonder Boy Accordionist with Lightning Fingers".

== Early life ==
Born in Townhead, Glasgow, Scotland, to Italian parents-Riccardo and Amelia (originally from Valvori, Italy). He was the eldest of seven children-three boys and four girls. Born in a backroom of a shop. He went on to gain a place at the local grammar school.

== Musical success ==
From an early age, Ernesto showed interest in learning the accordion. By the age of fourteen, he was nationally known as ‘Ernesto, the wonder boy accordionist, with lightning fingers’. He recorded on Decca, Imperial Label and Great Scott Records, played on radio and recorded television work, most notably on Pathetone Parade compilation. He also performed at the London Palladium.

Following on from these successes he went on the road and travelled to Ireland to perform and teach, sending the money he earned back home to his family. Whilst in Dublin he taught Shaun Bolger, who he later became a crack shot in the IRA.

When the Second World War started, he joined the British forces. This was very difficult for him, because as he was of Italian descent he realised that while doing his duty he would be fighting against the Italians. He joined the ‘Stars in Battledress Army entertainment group’ working alongside the likes of the late comedians Arthur Haynes and Bill Waddington, who later went on to play Percy Sugden in Coronation Street.

== Later life ==
When the war was over, he went back to the family business. By now his home was in Scarborough as his parents had decided to leave Scotland. He met his wife while on holiday in Italy and settled in Scarborough, having two children.

== Television ==
- Ernesto Jaconelli-Wonder Boy Accordionist-British Pathe Footage from 1933
- Lightening (sic) Fingers-British Pathe Footage from 1933
- Ernesto Jaconelli-Wonder Boy Accordionist-15 year old Accordionist plays 'Light Cavalry' on the Accordion-WPA Film Library Footage

== Discography ==
- (193?) Decca Records-Light Cavalry/Overture Mary of Argyle
- (193?) Imperial Records-Tesoro Mio
- (193?) Great Scott Records-Light Cavalry/Overture Mary of Argyle
