= Alamodome =

Multi-purpose domed stadium in San Antonio, Texas, United States

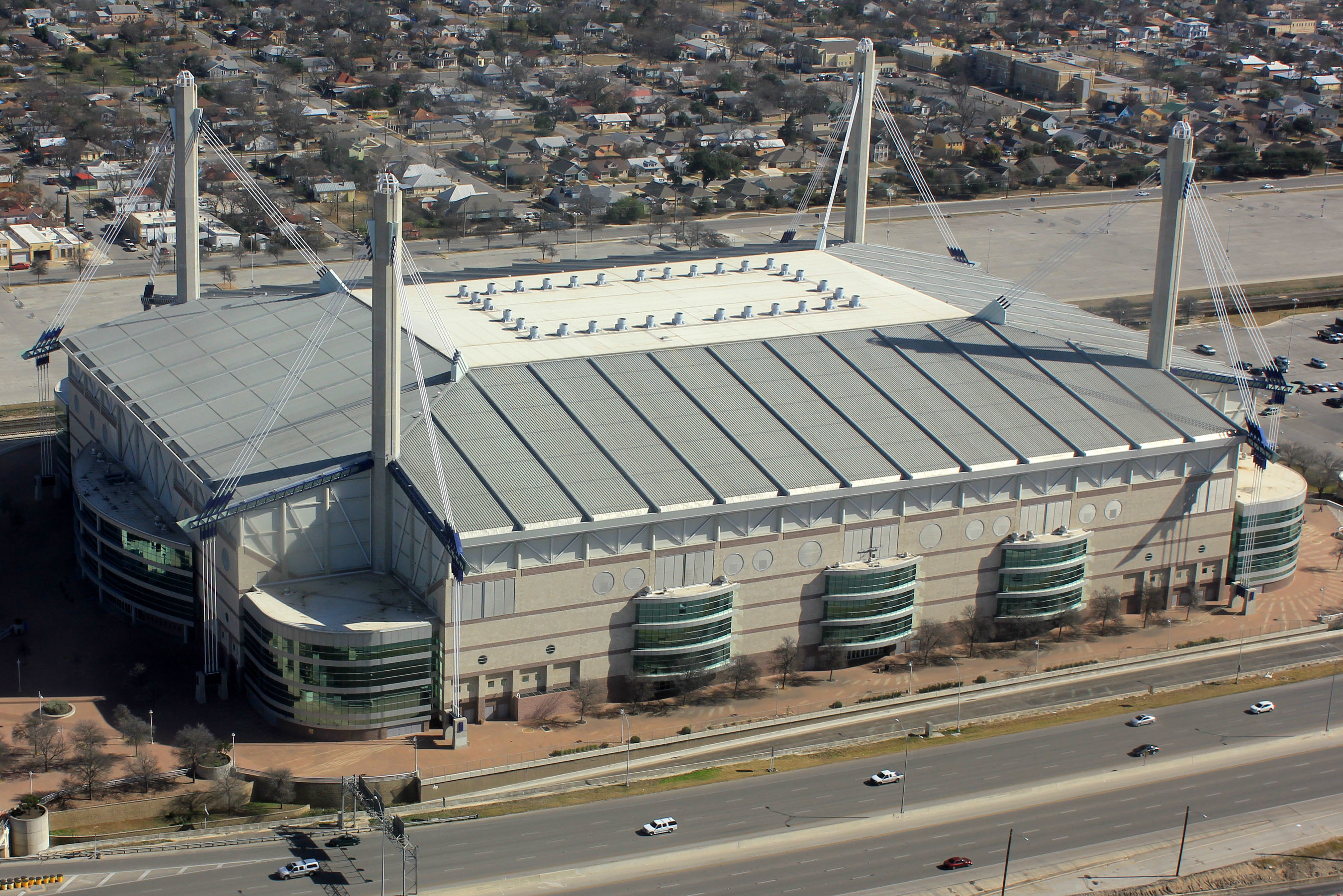
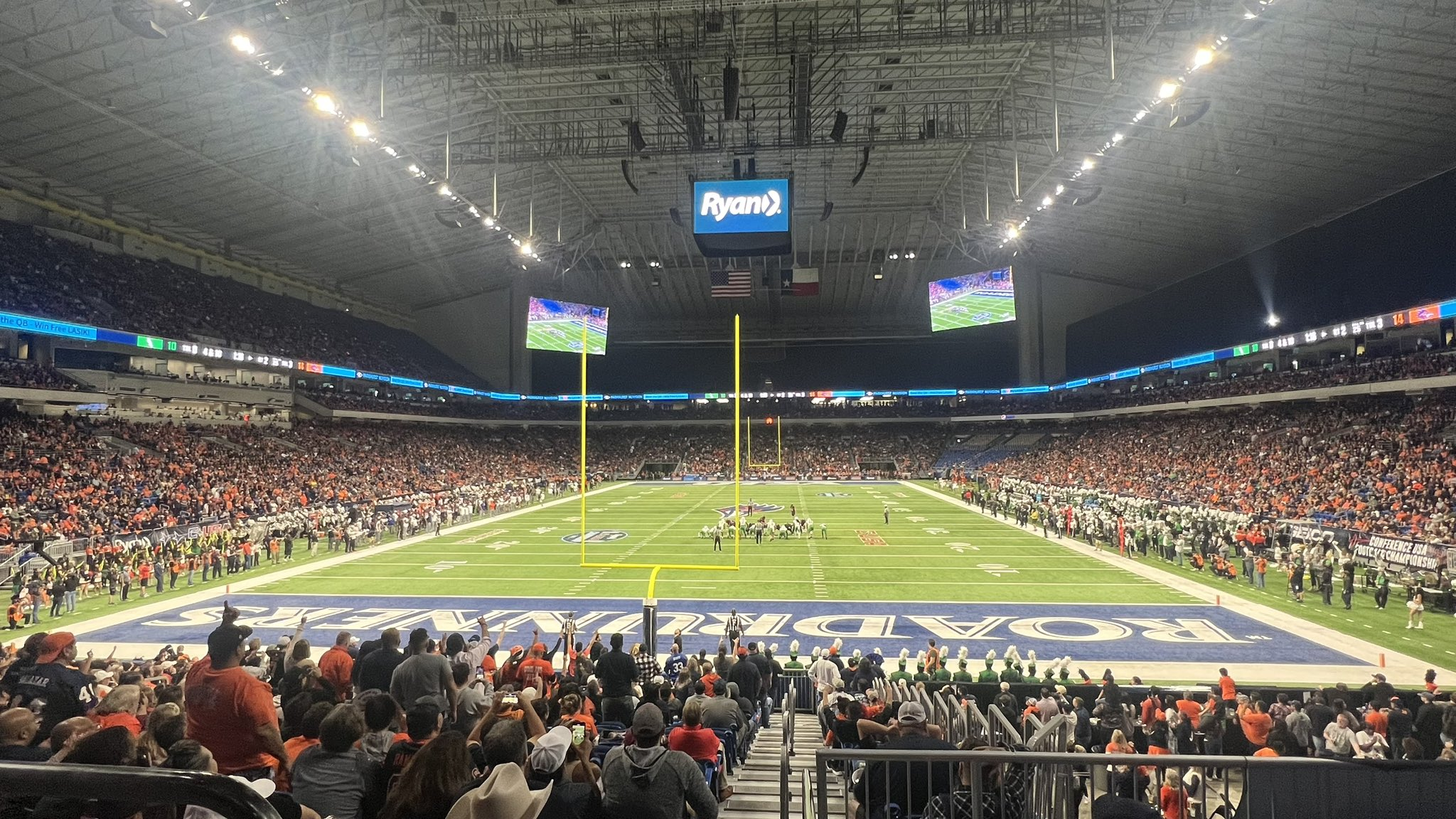

- Location in Texas Location in the United States
- Address: 100 Montana Street
- Location: San Antonio, Texas, U.S.
- Coordinates: 29°25′1″N 98°28′44″W
- Owner: City of San Antonio
- Operator: San Antonio Convention and Sports Facilities Department
- Capacity: American football: 64,000; Baseball: 52,295 Canadian football: 59,000; Basketball: 20,662 (expandable to 35,888 and 70,000); Ice hockey: 36,000; Boxing: 40,000; Wrestling: 52,020 (expandable to 60,525); Arena Concert: center-stage 33,000; end-stage 30,000; Stadium Concert: center-stage 77,000; end-stage 50,000
- Surface: AstroTurf Magic Carpet II
- Record attendance: List: All-Time Record: 76,483 (Spurs championship celebration); Baseball: 40,569; Basketball: 68,328; Football: 66,166; Hockey: 19,211; Soccer: 64,369; Arena Football: 10,034
- Field size: (Baseball): Left Field – 340 feet (104 m); Left-Center – 370 feet (113 m); Center Field – 395 feet (120 m); Right-Center – 305 feet (93 m); Right Field – 280 feet (85 m)
- Public transit: San Antonio

Construction
- Groundbreaking: November 5, 1990
- Opened: May 15, 1993
- Renovated: 2008, 2009, 2017
- Expanded: 2006
- Cost: US$186 million ($415 million in 2025 dollars)
- Architects: HOK Sport; Marmon Mok, LP
- Structural engineers: W.E. Simpson Company (Engineer of Record) and Martin & Martin (Preliminary Roof Structural Design)
- Services engineers: M–E Engineers, Inc.
- General contractor: Huber, Hunt & Nichols

Tenants
- Alamo Bowl (NCAA) 1993–present San Antonio Spurs (NBA) 1993–2002; San Antonio Texans (CFL) 1995; UTSA Roadrunners (NCAA) 2011–present San Antonio Talons (AFL) 2012–2014; San Antonio Commanders (AAF) 2019; San Antonio Brahmas (UFL) 2023–2025

Website
- alamodome.com

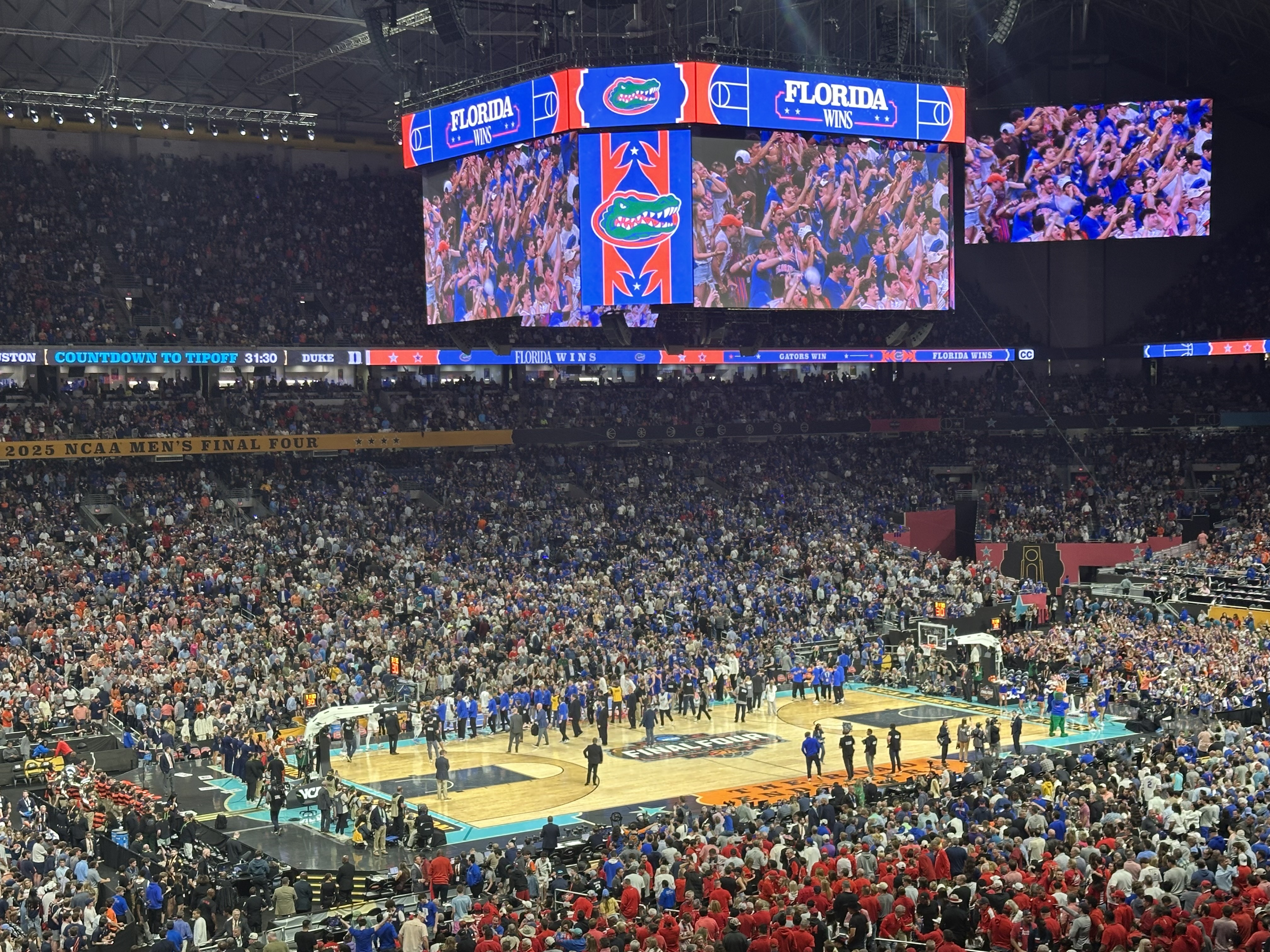
The Alamodome after Florida's win over Auburn in the 2025 Final Four

The Alamodome is a 64,000-seat domed indoor multi-purpose stadium in San Antonio, Texas. It is located on the southeastern fringe of downtown San Antonio. The facility opened on May 15, 1993, having been constructed at a cost of $186 million.

The multi-purpose facility was intended to increase the city's convention traffic and attract a professional football franchise. It also placated the San Antonio Spurs' demands for a larger arena. The Spurs played in the Alamodome for a decade, then became disenchanted with the facility and convinced Bexar County to construct a new arena for them, now called the Frost Bank Center. The Alamodome's regular tenant is currently the UTSA Roadrunners. Recent tenants include the San Antonio Commanders of the Alliance of American Football, the San Antonio Brahmas of the United Football League, and the San Antonio Talons of the Arena Football League.

== Features ==
The facility is a rectilinear 5-level stadium which can seat up to 64,000 spectators for a typical football game and marching band competitions and is expandable to hold 72,000 spectators.

The stadium was designed to easily convert into a basketball or hockey arena. Converting the stadium for basketball and hockey takes 12–18 hours to set up retractable seating and installing the playing surface. In this configuration, typically only the two lower levels at one or both ends are used. The arena configuration seats 20,662 spectators, but is expandable to 39,500 when the upper level is opened. The stadium can also be adapted into a smaller auditorium space (branded as the "Illusions Theater"), with an intimate, enclosed setting, seating upwards of 11,000 using floor space and the north grandstand.

The Alamodome opened with 38 luxury suites and 6,000 club level seats. The original design specifications called for 66 luxury suites. However, since the Spurs were the only full-time tenant at the time, only 38 luxury suites in the north end of the facility were built. The footprints for the 28 unbuilt luxury suites were open floor space just behind the club level seats that surround the south end of the facility. In 2006, the Alamodome underwent an expansion to accommodate 14 new luxury suites. The Sports Club and the Top of the Dome restaurant also received renovations in 2004.

The Alamodome has two permanent Olympic-size ice rinks that can be used for NHL games, figure skating and speed skating. The facility also contains 30,000 square feet (2,800 m^{2}) of meeting rooms and 160,000 square feet (15,000 m^{2}) of continuous exhibit space.

== Events and tenants ==
The Alamodome is currently the home of the University of Texas at San Antonio (UTSA) Roadrunners. Previously, it was home to the San Antonio Spurs of the NBA from 1993 to 2002, the San Antonio Texans of the CFL in 1995, the San Antonio Commanders of the Alliance of American Football in 2019, and the San Antonio Brahmas of the UFL in 2024.

The facility also hosts special events such as the annual Alamo Bowl football game, UTSA's graduation ceremonies, as well as most of Northside ISD's high school graduation ceremonies.

UIL State Football Playoff games are regularly held in the Alamodome, including State Quarterfinals/Region 4 Finals and championship games in 2002, 2006, 2007, and 2009.

=== NBA basketball ===
The Alamodome's ability to easily accommodate basketball made it attractive to then-Spurs owner Red McCombs, who had been looking for some time for a larger arena to replace their longtime home, HemisFair Arena. The Spurs moved to the Alamodome after the 1992–93 NBA season. They played nine seasons in the Alamodome from 1993 to 2002, including their first NBA championship season, which was played against the New York Knicks in 1999.

During the regular season, most of the upper level was curtained off. However, on certain weekends and when popular opponents came to town, the Spurs expanded the Alamodome's capacity to 35,000 by opening three portions of the upper level. More sections of the upper level were opened for the playoffs, expanding capacity to 39,500. Attendance was 39,514 for Game 1 of the 1999 NBA Finals and 39,554 for Game 2.

Though the late 1990s saw the Spurs soar in popularity, the decision was made to move the team out of the spacious stadium and build a new arena. While the Alamodome had been designed to accommodate basketball, it was primarily a football stadium. As the years passed, Spurs management and fans grew increasingly dissatisfied with its poor sight lines and cavernous feel. Part of the problem was the manner in which the Alamodome was configured for basketball. The basketball court was at one end of the venue with temporary stands on one side of the court, leaving over half of the stadium curtained off (the same problem and configuration existed for the Detroit Pistons in the mid-1980s during their tenancy at the Pontiac Silverdome). Television broadcast trucks were usually set up on the unused half of the playing surface. By comparison, more modern domed stadiums that can accommodate basketball, such as AT&T Stadium in Arlington, place the basketball court in the center of where the football field would be, allowing for much larger attendances. Additionally, the Spurs tied up the Alamodome for most of the year due to their deep playoff runs (they only missed the playoffs once in their nine years there). With the Alamodome booked solid well into the spring, it was difficult to accommodate conventions, concerts or even a prospective football team. Moving the Spurs out of the Alamodome opened up more contiguous dates allowing the facility to schedule more events, though it has yet to host a Super Bowl. The Spurs moved to the new SBC Center after the 2001–02 season.

The 1996 NBA All-Star Game was played in the Alamodome.

The Spurs hosted the Golden State Warriors at the Alamodome to celebrate their 50th anniversary in San Antonio on January 13, 2023, marking the first NBA game held at the Dome since Game 4 of the 2002 Western Conference semifinals. The game set a regular season single-game attendance record with 68,323 spectators.

=== College and high school football ===
==== Alamo Bowl ====
The Alamodome is the site of the annual Alamo Bowl, which matches the second-choice teams from the Pac-12 Conference and the Big 12 Conference. The 2006 Alamo Bowl between the Texas Longhorns and the Iowa Hawkeyes was attended by 65,875, which set a facility-record crowd for a sporting event, only to have that record broken by an Alamo Bowl event the next year between Texas A&M and Penn State, which drew 66,166 attendees.

==== Corps Classic ====
September 16, 2006, marked the first game in a college football "home and home" series, known as the AT&T Corps Classic, between the Texas A&M Aggies and the Army Black Knights. Army has elected to play its "home" game at the Alamodome in order to increase the program's exposure around the nation, as it competes as an independent. A sell-out crowd of 64,583 watched the Aggies defeat the Black Knights 28–24. The second game was played at Kyle Field in College Station in 2008.

==== East–West Shrine Game ====
The 2006 East–West Shrine Game was played in the Alamodome on January 21, 2006. The game is an annual post-season college football all-star game. For most of its history, the game has been played in the San Francisco Bay Area, at San Francisco's Kezar Stadium and at Stanford Stadium. In recent years it has been played at AT&T Park. In 2006, the game was played in the Alamodome, moving out of the San Francisco Bay Area for the first time in decades. The Shrine Game was moved once again for its 2007 event, to Robertson Stadium in Houston.

==== Texas Football Classic ====
From 1999 to 2011, the Alamodome was home to the Texas Football Classic, which featured prominent high school programs from across the state and kicked off the high school football season in Texas. Former participants include former Chicago Bears and University of Texas running back Cedric Benson, University of Iowa quarterback Drew Tate, University of Houston quarterback Kevin Kolb, and University of Missouri quarterback Chase Daniel.

==== All-American Bowl ====
Since 2002, the Alamodome has hosted the All-American Bowl—a national all-star game for U.S. high school football. Played in early-January, the game features teams representing the eastern and western United States. The 2017 edition hosted a record 40,568 spectators.

==== Texas vs. the Nation ====
In 2011, the Texas vs. The Nation game was moved to San Antonio and was renamed the NFLPA Game, after the new sponsor of the event. The concept of The NFLPA Game remained "Texas vs. the Nation" with seniors having ties to the state of Texas taking on top seniors from across the Nation. That was a one-year deal; the game became the NFLPA Collegiate Bowl in 2012.

==== UTSA Roadrunners ====
The UTSA Roadrunners football program began using the stadium in 2011. The Roadrunners set records for largest attendance at an initial game for a start-up NCAA college football program at 56,743, and largest average attendance for a start-up program's first season at 35,521. Its standard capacity of 64,000 for football made the Alamodome the largest stadium in Conference USA during UTSA's tenure in that conference, and it is also the largest dedicated college stadium in the Roadrunners' current home of the American Athletic Conference (two NFL stadiums used by other American Conference teams are slightly larger). However, for most games, UTSA only sells tickets for the lower bowl, with a capacity of 36,582.

===== Attendance Records =====
Rank	Attendance	Date	Game Result
1	56,743	September 3, 2011	UTSA 31, Northeastern State 3
2	49,342	September 9, 2023	UTSA 20, Texas State 13
3	45,778	September 6, 2025	UTSA 36, Texas State 43
4	42,071	September 8, 2018	UTSA 20, Baylor 37
5	41,412	December 2, 2022	23 UTSA 48, North Texas 27
6	41,148	December 3, 2021	UTSA 49, Western Kentucky 41
7	40,977	September 7, 2013	UTSA 36, 13 Oklahoma State 56
8	39,032	November 24, 2012	UTSA 38, Texas State 31
9	37,526	September 3, 2022	UTSA 35, 24 Houston 37^{3OT}
10	35,167	November 20, 2021	22 UTSA 34, UAB 31
11	33,517	September 24, 2011	UTSA 54, Bacone 7
12	33,472	September 4, 2014	UTSA 23, Arizona 26
13	33,403	September 5, 2026	UTSA 45, UTRGV 16
14	32,886	October 8, 2011	UTSA 27, South Alabama 30^{2OT}
15	32,487	September 28, 2013	UTSA 28, Houston 59
16	32,369	November 19, 2011	UTSA 49, Minot State 7
17	31,956	October 25, 2014	UTSA 0, UTEP 34
18	31,634	September 10, 2011	UTSA 21, McMurry 24
19	30,862	October 20, 2012	UTSA 24, San Jose State 52
20	30,718	September 14, 2019	UTSA 13, Army 31

==== Conference USA Championship ====
The Alamodome hosted the Conference USA Football Championship Game in 2021 and 2022 with UTSA defeating Western Kentucky 49-41 and North Texas 48–27.

==== Big 12 Conference championship ====
The Alamodome hosted the Big 12 Football Championship Game in 1997, 1999 and 2007.

=== Professional football ===
==== NFL ====
The Alamodome has played host to six National Football League preseason games. Two each were played in 1993 and 1994, one in 1995, and one in 2001.

Date	Team (Visitor)	Points	Team (Home)	Points	Spectators
August 7, 1993	Houston Oilers	28	New Orleans Saints	37	40,308
August 21, 1993	Dallas Cowboys	20	Houston Oilers	23	63,285
August 6, 1994	Houston Oilers	31	San Diego Chargers	3	29,815
August 20, 1994	Buffalo Bills	18	Houston Oilers	16	40,504
August 26, 1995	Dallas Cowboys	10	Houston Oilers	0	52,512
August 11, 2001	Minnesota Vikings	28	New Orleans Saints	21	46,752

In 2005, the NFL announced that the Alamodome would host three of the New Orleans Saints' regular season "home" games due to the damage caused to the Louisiana Superdome by Hurricane Katrina. The Saints played the Buffalo Bills (week 4), the Atlanta Falcons (week 6), and the Detroit Lions (week 16) at the Alamodome. Although there have been many NFL preseason games held in San Antonio over the years, these games were the first NFL regular season games played in the city. The Saints also played one 2005 season "home" game in Giants Stadium (against the New York Giants) in East Rutherford, New Jersey, and four others in LSU's Tiger Stadium in Baton Rouge, Louisiana. Overall, the Saints averaged 62,665 fans in the 64,000-seat Alamodome for the three games held there, a solid showing despite the short notice to sell tickets due to the hurricane. The Saints and the NFL announced that the team would return to Louisiana for the 2006 season even though at the time the NFL was uncertain where they would play their home games.

Date	Team (Visitor)	Points	Team (Home)	Points	Spectators
October 2, 2005	Buffalo Bills	7	New Orleans Saints	19	58,688
October 16, 2005	Atlanta Falcons	34	New Orleans Saints	31	65,562*
December 24, 2005	Detroit Lions	13	New Orleans Saints	12	63,747

Additionally, former NFL Commissioner Paul Tagliabue indicated that if the NFL expands again, San Antonio would be on the short list of candidate cities. Cowboys owner Jerry Jones has acknowledged his support for the city's efforts to become home to an NFL franchise even though public opinion is that he would never let go of his team's presence in the San Antonio market.

The Dallas Cowboys held their 2002, 2003, 2007, 2009, 2010, and 2011 preseason training camps at the Alamodome.

On July 29, 2014, it was reported by the San Antonio Express-News that Mark Davis met with officials from the city of San Antonio, Texas, to discuss the possibility of relocating the Raiders to San Antonio. Davis confirmed that he did speak with San Antonio city officials while visiting San Antonio to honor former Raiders wide receiver Cliff Branch's induction into a local Hall of Fame, but did not comment on whether he was considering relocation to San Antonio. If the Raiders had relocated to San Antonio, the Alamodome would almost certainly have been used as a temporary home until a new NFL stadium was built. The Raiders decided against moving to San Antonio, first proposing unsuccessfully to return to its previous home in Los Angeles, then ultimately receiving permission to relocate to Las Vegas in 2020 by constructing Allegiant Stadium.

==== CFL ====
The Alamodome was also home to the San Antonio Texans for the 1995 CFL season. The stadium was attractive to the Canadian Football League (which made an ill-fated attempt to expand to the U.S. between 1993 and 1995) since it was one of the rare American facilities that could fully accommodate the CFL's larger playing field and, having just recently opened, was one of the most modern facilities in a league where the majority of its teams were playing in decades-old or poorly fit stadiums. Its seating could be retracted to fit the full 65-yard width and 150-yard length of a regulation Canadian football field (which is 34% larger than the American field).

In the first CFL playoff game ever played between two U.S.-based franchises, the Texans defeated the Birmingham Barracudas 52–9 at the Alamodome on November 5, in front of 13,031 fans. The team then lost to the eventual champion Baltimore Stallions, 21–11, in Baltimore six days later, ending their season. This also proved to be the last game in franchise history; despite respectable attendance (15,573 average for ten home games) and manageable financial losses, widespread dysfunction among most of the rest of new American franchises led to the Texans' demise. (This made the Texans-Stallions game the last significant CFL game to be played in the United States.)

==== Arena football ====
From 2012 to 2014, the Alamodome was home to the San Antonio Talons of the Arena Football League. The Talons, who relocated from Tulsa, Oklahoma, in 2011, won the Central Division title in 2012 with a 14–4 record but were upset in the first round of the playoffs by Utah. The team slipped to 10–8 in 2013, missing the playoffs, then to 3-15 the following year, after which they folded. Attendance at the Dome for the Talons was mediocre at best, averaging 7,209 for 28 home games.

==== Alliance of American Football (AAF) ====
In 2019, the Alamodome was the home of the San Antonio Commanders of the Alliance of American Football, with the Commanders playing the AAF's inaugural game on February 9, 2019, against the San Diego Fleet. The Alamodome hosted each of the fledgling league's four best crowds, averaging 27,391 per contest (more than double that of the league's other seven teams, who averaged 13,524) before the AAF was shuttered in April 2019.

==== The Spring League ====
In October 2020, Fox Sports 1 reached a multi-year agreement to televise The Spring League along with the option to acquire a minority stake in TSL. The initial agreement was to play a mini-season in late October and November 2020. The league began its fall season October 27 with six teams competing in a 12-game format over four weeks in a bubble environment, based out of the Alamodome. After experiencing problem with the COVID-19 virus at the Dome, however, the final week's games were rescheduled for a high school field in San Antonio, then cancelled. The TSL championship game, also originally scheduled to be played at the Alamodome, was held at Camping World Stadium in Orlando on December 15, 2020.

==== XFL/UFL ====
The XFL announced that the San Antonio Brahmas would play at the Alamodome for the 2023 season on July 28, 2022. The Brahmas opened the season on February 19, 2023, in an 18–15 loss against the St. Louis Battlehawks in front of a crowd of 24,245.

The Alamodome hosted the inaugural XFL championship game on May 13, 2023. San Antonio was chosen to host because of its history of large events at the Alamodome.

=== College basketball ===
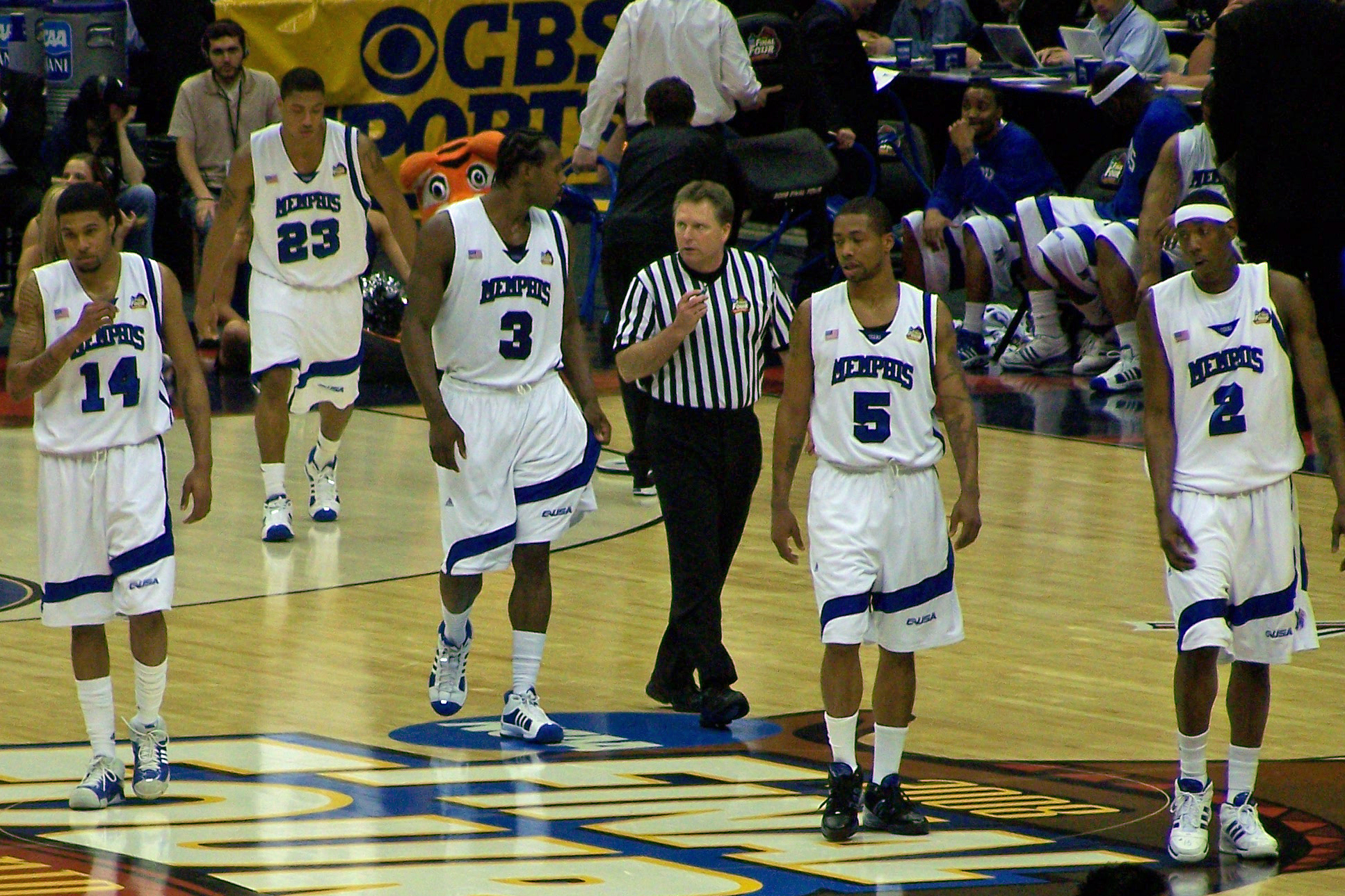
During the 2008 NCAA Final Four.

The NCAA Final Four was first hosted at the Alamodome in 1998; Kentucky won the tournament. Then in 2004, it hosted when Connecticut defeated Georgia Tech in the championship game. It again hosted in 2008, with Kansas defeating Memphis. The Final Four returned in 2018 with Villanova defeating Michigan; this time, the event used the current "center court" configuration mandated by the NCAA, where the game is played on an elevated court and all seating is utilized, allowing a crowd of over 70,000. The Final Four returned to the Alamodome in 2025, with Florida defeating Houston.

The Alamodome has also hosted the Women's Final Four in 2002, 2010, and 2021 (will be hosted again in 2029), as well as the 2011 NCAA women's volleyball Final Four.

=== Baseball ===
From 2013 to 2017, the Texas Rangers played exhibition games at the Alamodome to close out their spring training camp, the only time baseball has been played there. The Rangers took on the San Diego Padres in 2013, the Houston Astros in 2014, the Los Angeles Dodgers in 2015, the Kansas City Royals in 2016, and the Cleveland Indians in 2017.

The stadium is considered unsuitable for regular baseball use, since the right-field fence is only 272 feet from home plate, well below the required 325 feet.

=== Professional wrestling ===
The Alamodome has hosted WWE's Royal Rumble pay-per-view event three times. The first occurrence took place on January 19, 1997, in front of a packed crowd of just over 60,000 and saw San Antonio native Shawn Michaels defeat Sycho Sid for the WWF World Heavyweight Championship in the main event. The event also saw Texas native Stone Cold Steve Austin win the first of his record-setting three Royal Rumble matches. The second Royal Rumble to be held at the Alamodome took place 20 years later on January 29, 2017, in front of just over 52,000 fans in attendance. Randy Orton last eliminated Roman Reigns to win the Royal Rumble match in the night's main event.

Five years later in September 2022, WWE announced the Royal Rumble would return to the Alamodome for the 2023 event on January 28. The event had an attendance of 51,338. Rhea Ripley and Cody Rhodes won their respective Royal Rumble matches at the event. Roman Reigns defeated Kevin Owens in the main event to retain the Undisputed WWE Universal Championship and was betrayed by then Bloodline member Sami Zayn after the match.

On February 2, 1998, World Championship Wrestling held a live broadcast of WCW Monday Nitro in the stadium. The main event featured Sting defeating "Macho Man" Randy Savage by disqualification.

The Alamodome also hosted Impact Wrestling's Lockdown event on March 10, 2013.

=== Soccer ===
Due to San Antonio's proximity to Mexico, the Alamodome has hosted Mexican soccer teams in various events since the mid-2000s in addition to American teams.

The Mexican national soccer team first played in the Alamodome on June 19, 2004, in a FIFA World Cup qualifier, defeating Dominica 10–0 in front of 37,642 fans. Mexico returned on November 10 for a friendly against Guatemala, winning 2–0 in front of 22,000 fans. Mexico played an exhibition match against South Korea on January 29, 2014, attended by 54,313 people. An exhibition match between Mexico and the United States on April 15, 2015, sold out the stadium, attracting a crowd of 64,369. The US won the game 2–0, thanks to goals from Jordan Morris and Juan Agudelo. The match was marred by Mexico's displeasure with the temporary grass field laid on the Alamodome floor, which was described as "uneven" and "full of patches".

The United States women's national soccer team played an exhibition match against Trinidad and Tobago at the Alamodome on December 11, 2015, as part of their "Victory Tour" following the 2015 FIFA Women's World Cup. The match was attended by 10,690 people.

The Alamodome was announced as a host venue for a doubleheader at the 2017 CONCACAF Gold Cup, and played host to a double-header on July 16, 2017, between Mexico and Curaçao and El Salvador and Jamaica.

Two matches in the 2005 InterLiga series were played on the Alamodome on January 6, 2005, featuring Mexican club teams Club América, Chiapas F.C., Toluca FC, and Club Necaxa. Club América returned for an exhibition match against Santos Laguna on July 9, 2016.

The Alamodome was to be the home venue of a planned Major League Soccer (MLS) franchise in 2005, but the league was unable to come to an agreement with the city. A new expansion bid plans to use Toyota Field, a soccer-specific stadium used by San Antonio FC, for the MLS team instead of the Alamodome.

=== Other sports ===
The 1993 U.S. Olympic Festival held some of the first paid events in the Alamodome in July and August 1993, including the opening and closing ceremonies and ice skating events.

The now-defunct San Antonio Dragons of the International Hockey League played some games in 1997 and 1998 at the Alamodome when its home, Freeman Coliseum, was unavailable during the annual San Antonio Stock Show & Rodeo (a similar scheduling conflict the Spurs now face at the newer Frost Bank Center). The Professional Bull Riders (PBR) has held two Built Ford Tough Series events in the Alamodome (2007, 2008).

Two NHL pre-season games were held at the Alamodome. The Dallas Stars faced off against the Los Angeles Kings in back-to-back seasons at the Alamodome in 1994 and 1995. The Stars defeated the Kings 3–2 on September 27, 1994, with 14,342 fans in attendance (this was one of the last hockey games to take place before the 1994–95 NHL lockout). The following year Dallas claimed a 4–2 victory over the Kings in front of 8,122 hockey fans on September 26, 1995. Hockey Hall of Fame forward Wayne Gretzky participated in both preseason matchups.

In college football, Notre Dame has played two Shamrock Series (home-away-from-home) games here against Washington State in 2009 and Army in 2016.

=== Music ===
After the opening ceremonies, the first major event held at the facility was Paul McCartney's The New World Tour concert, which took place on May 29, 1993.

The Alamodome has played host to music festivals, including Ozzfest. It has also hosted concerts to artists such as Shakira, Bruno Mars, Chris Brown, Usher, Karol G, The Rolling Stones, U2, Prince, Elton John, Tina Turner, Rod Stewart, AC/DC, George Strait, Britney Spears, Guns N' Roses, *NSYNC, Backstreet Boys, Janet Jackson, Metallica, Pink Floyd, Alice Cooper, Def Leppard, Mötley Crüe, Scorpions, Rammstein, Kanye West, My Chemical Romance, and many more.

Drum Corps International (DCI) hosts its Southwestern Championships at the Alamodome each July. This competition marks the first (and usually only) time during the DCI Summer Tour that each World Class corps gets to compete against each other at the same event prior to the DCI World Championships held a few weeks later at Lucas Oil Stadium.

Each November, the Alamodome also hosts the Bands of America San Antonio Super Regional Championships, as well as the University Interscholastic League State Marching Band Contest.

=== Other events ===
The Alamodome was used as a filming location for the film Selena, a biographical film chronicling the life of Tejano musician Selena. It was used as a stand-in for the Astrodome in Houston.

From July 5 to July 16, 2006, the Alamodome hosted the ELCA Youth Gathering. Approximately 40,000 youth and adult leaders attended the event, between the two weeks it was spread.

On September 10, 1993, Julio César Chávez Sr. challenged Pernell Whitaker for the WBC welterweight boxing championship title. The match, infamously, ended in a draw. In April 2013, Austin Trout fought the undefeated Canelo Alvarez at the Alamodome.

The Alamodome hosted the 2015 General Conference Session of Seventh-day Adventists.

Since 2015, the Alamodome has hosted the University Interscholastic League boys and girls State Basketball Championships.

Over the Fourth of July weekend in 2010, San Antonio hosted its largest convention ever. The 75th annual World convention of alcoholics anonymous. Over 50,000 people from 75 different countries attended meetings and seminars around the city The three main meetings of the convention were held in the Alamodome.

On March 20–24, 2022, it was used for the qualifying rounds of American Ninja Warrior's Season 14.

On October 17, 2026, before a football game between UTSA Roadrunners football and Navy Midshipmen football, a member of the US Air Force died after falling from the rafters of the Alamodome while attempting to rappel.

== Renovations ==
On April 15, 2005, the San Antonio City Council voted to spend close to $6.5 million to renovate the Alamodome in an effort to lure a Major League Soccer franchise to the city. After the election of Phil Hardberger as the new mayor, those efforts were abandoned, though the approved renovations to the facility continued as planned. The city administration and local business leaders have re-focused their efforts to bringing an NFL franchise to San Antonio.

On April 19, 2007, the San Antonio City Council unanimously approved an additional $8.3 million to fund renovations and enhancements to the facility.

In the summer of 2008 the audio system was upgraded.

In 2009 new LED video panels were added to the 5th level.

Although the Alamodome was built for NFL football, by today's standards, the facility would have to undergo renovations and add a considerable number of luxury suites in order to make it a profitable venue for an NFL team. In 2024, the city estimated a renovated Alamodome, anchoring a new sports park in downtown San Antonio, could combine to cost $3–4 billion.

In 2011, the Alamodome introduced a new configuration branded as the Illusions Theater, wherein the north end of the stadium can be partitioned into a smaller, pop-up auditorium setting with a ceiling, carpeting, and stage. The configuration includes up to 1,000 seats of floor space, and can seat up to 11,600 when using the existing grandstand. The configuration was designed to host mid-sized events (which, prior to its closure and renovation, were primarily held at the San Antonio Municipal Auditorium), including concerts, conventions, and graduation ceremonies. The project had a budget of $1 million.

In 2016, the San Antonio City Council approved $50 million worth of upgrades to modernize the facilities to keep it competitive for NCAA events. The improvements include a new media center, upgrades to the locker rooms, expanded concourses and added concessions, 4 new video screens and ribbon boards wrapping the 5th level, a new sound system, and other technology upgrades, and upgraded lighting.

== Record crowds ==
Top 10 all-time Alamodome sports crowds:

Rank	Attendance	Event	Teams	Date
1	68,323	2022–23 NBA regular season game	Golden State Warriors vs. San Antonio Spurs	Jan. 13, 2023
2	68,257	2018 NCAA Final Four	Loyola-Chicago vs. Michigan Kansas vs. Villanova	Mar. 31, 2018
3	68,252	2025 NCAA Final Four	Florida vs. Auburn Houston vs. Duke	Apr. 5, 2025
4	67,831	2018 NCAA Division I Men's Basketball Championship Game	Michigan vs. Villanova	Apr. 2, 2018
5	66,602	2025 NCAA Division I Men's Basketball Championship Game	Florida vs. Houston	Apr. 7, 2025
6	66,166	2007 Alamo Bowl	Penn State vs. Texas A&M	Dec. 29, 2007
7	65,918	2013 Alamo Bowl	Oregon vs. Texas	Dec. 30, 2013
8	65,875	2006 Alamo Bowl	Texas vs. Iowa	Dec. 30, 2006
9	65,562	2005 NFL regular season game	Atlanta Falcons vs. New Orleans Saints	Oct. 16, 2005
10	65,380	1999 Alamo Bowl	Penn State vs. Texas A&M	Dec. 28, 1999

Other notable attendance marks include:

- 76,483: San Antonio Spurs championship celebration (2014)
- 70,956: George Strait, The Cowboy Rides Away Tour (2013)
- 60,447: WWF Royal Rumble 1997
- 58,891: 1993 Julio César Chávez–Pernell Whitaker boxing match
- 56,743: 2011 Northeastern State vs. UTSA regular season football game (record for the highest-attended game for an NCAA Division I FCS start-up program)
- 54,313: 2014 soccer friendly Mexico vs. South Korea
- 53,407: 2009 Notre Dame vs. Washington State regular season football game.
- 52,020: WWE Royal Rumble 2017
- 51,338: WWE Royal Rumble 2023
- 48,709: Paul McCartney, The New World Tour (1993)
- 45,343: Metallica, WorldWired Tour (2017)
- 44,468: 2004 NCAA Division I men's basketball championship game, Georgia Tech vs. UConn (a facility record for basketball)
- 44,000: Black Sabbath Reunion Tour '99
- 43,257: 2008 NCAA Division I men's basketball championship game, Kansas Jayhawks vs. Memphis Tigers
- 40,509: 1998 NCAA Division I men's basketball championship game, Utah vs. Kentucky
- 39,554: 1999 NBA Finals (Game 2), New York Knicks vs. San Antonio Spurs
- 38,490: Rammstein Stadium Tour, 2022
- 36,451: CONCACAF 2006 FIFA World Cup qualifier (round 2), Dominica vs. Mexico
- 36,037: 1996 NBA All-Star Game
- 29,619: 2002 NCAA Division I women's basketball championship game, Oklahoma vs. UConn (the largest turnout for an official NCAA women's basketball game) (Note: The largest turnout for any game involving NCAA women's teams—or indeed any women's basketball game—was 55,646, for a 2023 preseason exhibition contest between DePaul and Iowa held at Iowa's football stadium.)
- 22,043: CFL, Calgary Stampeders vs. San Antonio Texans (1995)
- 19,211: Hockey: 1997 Phoenix Roadrunners vs. San Antonio Dragons
- 14,140: 2016 DCI Southwestern Championship (total paid attendees)

== See also ==
- List of NCAA Division I FBS football stadiums
- Lists of stadiums

== Footnotes ==
Events and tenants
Preceded by HemisFair Arena	Home of the San Antonio Spurs; 1993–2002	Succeeded by Frost Bank Center
Preceded by Louisiana Superdome	Home of the New Orleans Saints (with Giants Stadium & Tiger Stadium); 2005 (3 games)	Succeeded by Louisiana Superdome
Preceded by first stadium	Home of the San Antonio Brahmas; 2023 – present	Succeeded by current
Preceded by America West Arena	Host of the NBA All-Star Game; 1996	Succeeded by Gund Arena
Preceded by Trans World Dome; Trans World Dome; Arrowhead Stadium	Host of the Big 12 Championship Game; 1997; 1999; 2007	Succeeded by Trans World Dome; Arrowhead Stadium; Arrowhead Stadium
Preceded by RCA Dome; Louisiana Superdome; Georgia Dome; University of Phoenix Stadium; State Farm Stadium	NCAA Men's Division I Basketball Tournament; Finals Venue; 1998; 2004; 2008; 2018; 2025	Succeeded by Tropicana Field; Edward Jones Dome; Ford Field; U.S. Bank Stadium; Lucas Oil Stadium
Preceded by BOK Center (Tulsa)	Home of the San Antonio Talons; 2012 – 2014	Succeeded by none
Preceded by Nashville Municipal Auditorium	Host of Lockdown; 2013	Succeeded by BankUnited Center
Preceded by Selland Arena; Amway Center; The Dome at America's Center	Host of Royal Rumble; 1997; 2017; 2023	Succeeded by San Jose Arena; Wells Fargo Center; Tropicana Field
