= Melissa Cristina Márquez =

Puerto Rican marine biologist

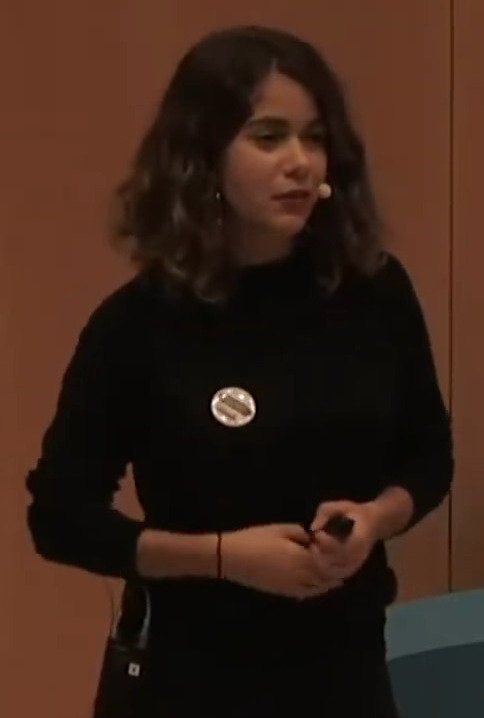
Márquez in 2019

Melissa Cristina Márquez is a Puerto Rican marine biologist and science communicator. She studies chondrichthyan fishes, including great white sharks.

== Early life and education ==
Márquez was inspired to study sharks when she first saw a great white shark on the Discovery Channel program Shark Week when she moved from Mexico to the United States. She completed her undergraduate degree at the New College of Florida in Sarasota, Florida, and a master's degree from Victoria University of Wellington in New Zealand. Márquez is currently pursuing a PhD at Curtin University in Australia, where she uses remote sensing techniques to assess environmental influences on the composition and distribution of elasmobranchs.

== Research and career ==
Márquez is involved in multiple forms of public engagement. She launched The Fins United Initiative to provide "scientifically accurate and open-access (free) materials for educators worldwide", which includes bilingual resources for educators. She co-hosts ConCiencia Azul, a podcast that interviews Spanish-speaking researchers about ocean-related topics and unique challenges faced in Hispanic countries. In spring 2021, Márquez wrote a children's book series, titled Wild Survival!, based on her animal encounters. In 2023, she published a children's picture book titled Mother of Sharks. She is also a contributor to Forbes' science section.

In 2018, during a taping of Shark Week, Márquez was attacked by a crocodile while on a shark dive.

Márquez has previously been recognized as a member of InStyle's February 2021 Badass 50 list, and as a member of the annual Forbes 30 under 30 - Science list (2021). She has spoken about her research for various media outlets, including NPR, National Geographic, and BBC. She was named to Fuse Media's Future Hispanic History Class of 2021.

Márquez was named a Superstar of STEM for 2025–26 by Science and Technology Australia.

== Selected academic publications ==
- Oceanography's Diversity Deficit: Identifying and Addressing Challenges for Marginalized Groups. Salma T. Abdel-Raheem, Allison R. Payne, Milagros G. Rivera, S. Kersey Sturdivant, Nia S. Walker, Melissa C. Márquez, Armando Ornelas, Mo Turner, Kelsey Byers, Roxanne S. Beltran. Oceanography. 20 December, 2023.
- Science Communication in Multiple Languages Is Critical to Its Effectiveness. Melissa C. Márquez and Ana Maria Porras. Frontiers in Communication. 22 May 2020.
- How 'Blue' Is 'Green' Energy? Andrew J. Wright, Claryana Araújo-Wang, John Y. Wang, Peter S. Ross, Jakob Tougaard, Robin Winkler, Melissa C. Márquez, Frances C. Robertson, Kayleigh Fawcett Williams, Randall R. Reeves. Trends in Ecology and Evolution. 2020.
