= Iaconelli =

Iaconelli is a surname, most commonly found in Brazil, and also in Italy, France and the United States of America.

== Notable people with this surname ==
- Carlos Iaconelli (born 1987), Brazilian racing car driver
- Michael Iaconelli (born 1972), American professional bass fisherman and TV personality
