= Sharon Landesman Ramey =

American behavioral scientist

- Spouse: Craig Ramey

Academic background
- Education: BA, Psychology and Comparative Physiology, New College of Florida; PhD, Developmental Psychology, 1974, University of Washington
- Thesis: A description and modification of the behavior of nonambulatory, profoundly mentally retarded children. (1974)

Academic work
- Institutions: Virginia Tech Carilion School of Medicine and Research Institute; University of Alabama at Birmingham

Sharon Landesman Ramey (nee Dwyer) is an American behavioral scientist who specializes in child development.

== Early life and education ==
Ramey completed her Bachelor of Arts degree in psychology from New College of Florida and her PhD in development psychology from the University of Washington (UW). In 2007, she was the recipient of UW's Distinguished Alumna Award.

== Career ==
Upon graduating, Ramey and her husband joined the faculty at the University of Alabama at Birmingham to direct the Civitan International Research Center.

In 2016, Ramey and her husband were appointed as the city's chief science officers for human development by City manager Chris Morrill. In their roles as chief science officers for human development, the Ramey's were expected to provide expertise in the areas of child and family development, data analysis, and community-based participatory partnerships. Following this, she co-authored a paper which significant racial and ethnic disparities in breastfeeding outcomes. They found that black mothers were nine times more likely to be given formula for their babies than white mothers in the hospital. A few years later, Ramey was the co-lead principal investigator of the nation's first clinical trial for rehabilitating infant stroke victims. She became the co-director of the institute's Neuromotor Research Clinic and received the Sheila S. Strauss Art Venture Award from the Taubman Museum of Art.

Due to her research and academic accomplishments, she was elected a fellow of the American Association for the Advancement of Science. During the COVID-19 pandemic, Ramey was named the director of the nation's first pediatric rehabilitation resource center to help clinical scientists in pediatric rehabilitation research by funding pilot studies.

== Personal life ==
Ramey is married to Craig Ramey, the founding director of the Civitan International Research Center at UAB.
