= Solidcore =

American fitness center chain

[solidcore]
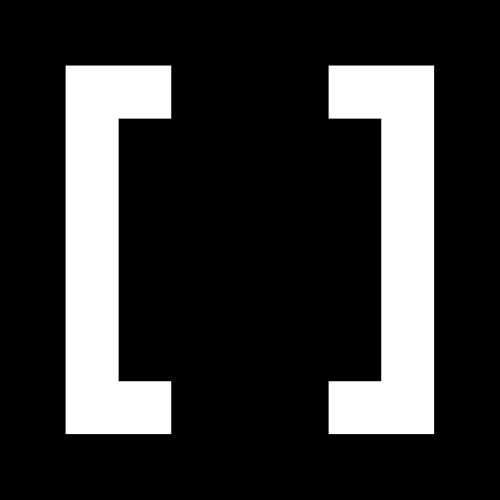
- Type: Private
- Industry: Fitness
- Founded: November 2013
- Founder: Anne Mahlum
- Headquarters: Rosslyn, Virginia
- Number of locations: 150
- Area served: United States
- Key people: Bryan Myers (President & CEO)
- Website: solidcore.co

Solidcore (stylised as [solidcore]) is a fitness company headquartered in Rosslyn, Virginia, operating 160+ studios across the United States. Founded in 2013 in Washington, D.C., the company focuses on full-body strength training classes on custom-built reformer machines.

== History ==
Solidcore was founded by Anne Mahlum in November 2013, with the first studio opening in the Adams Morgan neighborhood of Washington, D.C. In its early stages, the company operated from Mahlum's home in Northwest D.C.

The brand expanded to 100 locations with backing from investment firms, including Kohlberg & Company and VMG Partners.

Bryan Myers was appointed president and CEO in 2021, making him one of the few Black and LGBTQ+ executives leading a major fitness company in the United States. He joined the company in 2017 after previously serving as Vice President of Finance, Strategy, and Development at Sweetgreen. Myers became Solidcore's president in 2019, overseeing national expansion and operational development.

In 2024, Good Housekeeping named Solidcore the ‘Best Pilates-Inspired Studio’ in its annual fitness awards. In 2025, Well & Good recognized Solidcore as the “Best Inclusive Gym”.

In September 2024, global investment firm L Catterton acquired a majority stake in Solidcore.

In 2025, Solidcore partnered with WHOOP, a wearable fitness tracking company, to provide users with data on how the workout affects recovery and physical performance.

== Social responsibility ==
In 2019, Solidcore introduced a "Pay It Forward" membership tier, where members could contribute to a fund that subsidized memberships for individuals from marginalized groups, including LGBTQ+ youth and people recovering from chronic illness.

During the COVID-19 pandemic, Solidcore offered complimentary online classes for healthcare workers and first responders nationwide, reaching over 15,000 participants in 2020 alone.

== Projects ==
=== Classes ===
Solidcore classes utilize a custom-built resistance machine to apply sustained time under tension, following strength training principles aimed at improving muscular endurance and core engagement. Each class typically begins with a warm-up focused on core activation, followed by a structured sequence targeting different muscle groups. Classes are held in dimly lit studios with blue lighting and are designed to bring muscles to the point of fatigue through controlled, high-intensity movements.

Solidcore has received attention in part due to its use by several public figures, including Michelle Obama, Sydney Sweeney, and Vanessa Hudgens.
