= Fat Camp: An MTV Docs Movie Presentation =

2006 television film

- Starring: Petey Mulherin; Marisa Cristinzio; Matt Liber; Dianne Harbaugh; Braelyn Villella; Chelsea G. Jimbo Slice
- Country of origin: United States
- Original language: English

Production
- Producer: Gigantic Productions
- Running time: 90 minutes

Original release
- Network: MTV
- Release: February 15, 2006

Fat Camp: An MTV Docs Movie Presentation is a 2006 documentary television film about five teens at a fat camp founded by Tony Sparber, called Camp Pocono Trails (CPT), in the Poconos, Pennsylvania.
