= Rowan Jacobsen =

American writer

Rowan Jacobsen is an American author and journalist. He is known for his writings on nature, science, sustainability, and the organoleptic experience.

== Biography ==
Jacobsen is the author of nine books. His writing has appeared in The New York Times, Newsweek, Harper's Magazine, Outside, Orion, Eating Well, Forbes, Popular Science, Mother Jones, Vice, Lucky Peach, Food & Wine, Smithsonian, Scientific American, Audubon, and Yankee among others.

Jacobsen's work is regularly anthologized in The Best American Science & Nature Writing and Best Food Writing collections. He has been an Alicia Patterson Foundation fellow where he has written about endangered diversity on the borderlands between India, Myanmar, and China. As a McGraw Center for Business Journalism Fellow, he wrote about the disruptive potential of plant-based proteins and as a Knight Science Journalism fellow at MIT he focused on the environmental and evolutionary impact of synthetic biology. He has performed with Pop-Up Magazine, lectured at Harvard and Yale, and appeared on CBS, NBC, and NPR. He currently lives in Vermont.

== Awards and honors ==
Jacobsen received the James Beard Awards for his book: A Geography of Oysters and his Eating Well piece, "Or Not to Bee." His Outside Magazine piece, "Heart of Dark Chocolate," received the Lowell Thomas Award from the Society of American Travel Writers for best adventure story of the year. His Harper's piece, "The Homeless Herd," was named best magazine piece of the year by the Overseas Press Club. His book, "Apples of Uncommon Character " was named the Best Food Book of the Year by the Washington Post, Wall Street Journal, Boston Globe, NPR, and others. Lastly, Fruitless Fall received the 2009 Green Prize for Sustainable Literature.

== Books ==
- Chocolate Unwrapped: The Surprising Health Benefits of America's Favorite Passion (Invisible Cities Press USA, 2003)
- A Geography of Oysters (Bloomsbury USA, 2007)
- Fruitless Fall: The Collapse of the Honey Bee and the Coming Agricultural Crisis (Bloomsbury USA, 2008)
- The Living Shore: Rediscovering a Lost World (Bloomsbury USA, 2009)
- American Terroir: Savoring the Flavors of Our Woods, Waters, and Fields (Bloomsbury USA, 2010)
- Shadows on the Gulf: A Journey through Our Last Great Wetland (Bloomsbury USA, 2011)
- Apples of Uncommon Character: Heirlooms, Modern Classics, and Little-Known Wonders (Bloomsbury USA, 2014)
- The Essential Oyster: A Salty Appreciation of Taste and Temptation (Bloomsbury USA, 2016)
- Truffle Hound: On the Trail of the World’s Most Seductive Scent, with Dreamers, Schemers, and Some Extraordinary Dogs (Bloomsbury USA, 2021)
- In Defense of Sunlight: The Surprising Science of Sun Exposure (Scribner, 2026)
