= Mike Yaconelli =

American writer and church leader (1942–2003)

- Born: Michael Yaconelli; July 24, 1942
- Died: October 30, 2003 (aged 61); Redding, California
- Occupations: Youth Worker, author, theologian
- Organization: Youth Specialties
- Known for: Co-Founder of Youth Specialties

Mike Yaconelli (July 24, 1942 – October 30, 2003) was a writer, theologian, church leader and satirist. Co-founder of Youth Specialties, a training organization for Christian youth leaders, and The Wittenburg Door (sometimes just The Door), a satirical magazine, Yaconelli was also the pastor of a small church in Yreka, California - "the slowest growing church in America" as he called it. He and wife Karla used to share their time between Yreka and the Youth Specialties offices in El Cajon, California.

As well as his contributions to the Wittenburg Door, Yaconelli also wrote a number of books for youth leaders, and was a well-received Christian conference speaker. He was a regular at the Greenbelt festival in the UK. On his last visit to Greenbelt, he said:

If I were to have a heart attack right at this moment, I hope I would have just enough air in my lungs and just enough strength in me to utter one last sentence as I fell to the floor: "What a ride!" My life has been up and down, careening left then right, full of mistakes and bad decisions, and if I died right now, even though I would love to live longer, I could say from the depths of my soul, "What a ride!"

Mike was killed in an automobile accident in 2003.

== Publications ==
- Messy Spirituality - God's Annoying Love for Imperfect People
- Dangerous Wonder
- The CORE Realities of Youth Ministry
