= Anne Mahlum =

American entrepreneur (born 1980)

- Born: Anne Michelle Mahlum; 3 November 1980 (age 45); Bismarck, North Dakota
- Occupation: Entrepreneur
- Spouse: Brett Eaton (m. 2024)
- Website: www.annemahlum.com

Anne Michelle Mahlum (born November 3, 1980) is an American entrepreneur, philanthropist, motivational speaker, and advocate for personal growth and social impact. She is the founder of solidcore, a boutique fitness company with locations across the United States. She is also the founder of Back on My Feet, a national nonprofit organization that uses running to help individuals experiencing homelessness achieve self-sufficiency.

== Education and career ==
Originally from Bismarck, North Dakota, Mahlum has a dual BS degree in Political Science and Government & Public Relations from St. Cloud State University and a MA degree in Political Communication from American University.

In May 2007, she launched Back on My Feet, a Philadelphia-based non-profit organization for homeless people. The organization combines running programs with support services to help individuals experiencing homelessness rebuild their lives. She left the non-profit in July 2013. Mahlum’s work with Back on My Feet earned her national recognition, including being named a CNN Hero in 2008.

In 2013, Mahlum launched [solidcore], a fitness company specializing in high-intensity, low-impact workouts. With over 160 locations, solidcore has become one of the fastest-growing fitness brands in the United States. Mahlum sold her shares in [solidcore] for $88 million in 2023.

=== Recognition ===
Mahlum has been named ABC World News Person of the Week, a 2008 CNN Hero, 40 under 40 individual by Philadelphia, Women's Health Magazine's Game Changers, and Washington DC's Top 40 under 40. She is also a recipient of 2012 Brava Award by CEO Magazine.

She's been featured in Washington Business Journal, CNBC, Forbes, Fortune, and Runner's World.
