= Back on My Feet (non-profit organization) =

American non-profit organization

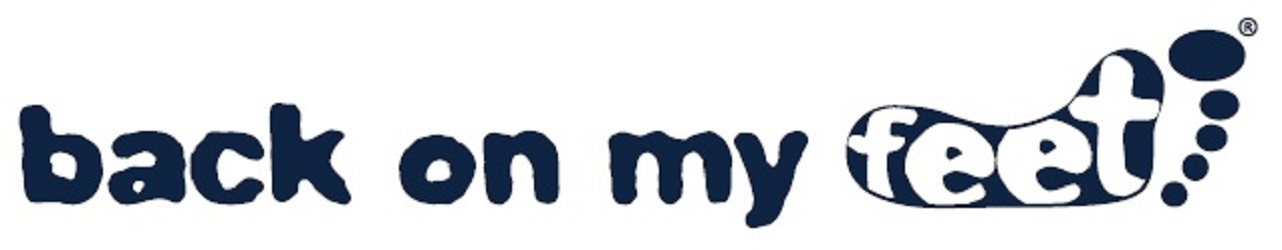
- Back on My Feet Logo
- Formation: July 3, 2007
- Legal status: 501(c)3 Non Profit Organization
- Headquarters: Philadelphia, U.S.
- CEO: Terence Gerchberg
- Website: backonmyfeet.org

Back on My Feet (BoMF) is a national non-profit organization focused on helping homeless people gain independence, living skills, and connect them with essential community resources, ultimately leading them to sustainable employment and stable housing. The organization's program is focused primarily on physical exercise, specifically early morning runs.

The organization was founded in Philadelphia, Pennsylvania, United States in 2007 and as of October 2023 has chapters in 16 US cities. Back on My Feet is privately funded and its 2019 operating budget is $7.5 million.

== History ==
Back on My Feet started in June 2007. Every morning, founder and avid runner Anne Mahlum waved hello and ran past a group of homeless men. In a few weeks, Mahlum decided to contact Sunday Breakfast Rescue Mission, the homeless shelter where these men were living, and ask Executive Director Richard McMillen if she could invite the men to join her on her runs. He agreed, and the first run took place on Wednesday, July 3, 2007, with a group of nine individuals ages 28–57, who were hoping to move their lives forward both physically and spiritually through running.

== Program and impact ==
Operating in 16 major cities, Back on My Feet uses running and community along with essential housing and workforce development resources to help individuals currently experiencing homelessness obtain sustainable employment and stable housing.

The Back on My Feet program begins with recruitment at transitional homeless and residential facilities as well as addiction and treatment facilities in those 16 cities across the US. Participants in the program (referred to as "members") commit to run 3 times a week, early in the morning. Following 30 days, if a member has achieved 90% attendance, they move on to the organization's Next Steps program.
