= 2010–11 Hartford Hawks women's basketball team =

Intercollegiate basketball season

2010–11 Hartford Hawks women's basketball

American East tournament champions

NCAA tournament, first round
- Conference: America East Conference
- Record: 17–16 (11–5 America East)
- Head coach: Jennifer Rizzotti (12th season)
- Assistant coach: Bill Sullivan
- Home arena: Chase Arena at Reich Family Pavilion

2010–11 America East Conference women's basketball standings
	Conf.				Overall
Team	W		L	PCT	W		L	PCT
UMBC	13	–	3	.813	20	–	12	.625
Boston U.	12	–	4	.750	17	–	14	.548
Binghamton	11	–	5	.688	19	–	12	.613
Hartford †	11	–	5	.688	17	–	15	.531
Albany	9	–	7	.563	16	–	14	.533
New Hampshire	6	–	10	.375	9	–	20	.310
Vermont	5	–	11	.313	5	–	25	.167
Stony Brook	3	–	13	.188	7	–	23	.233
Maine	2	–	14	.125	4	–	25	.138
† 2011 America East tournament winner

The 2010–11 Hartford Hawks women's basketball team represented the University of Hartford during the 2010–11 NCAA Division I women's basketball season. Jennifer Rizzotti returned for her 12th season as head coach. With most of the previous season's roster returning, Hartford was poised to make a run in the America East Conference. Hartford struggled in its non-conference schedule going 3–10, including a season-opening loss to rival Central Connecticut. Hartford salvaged its season by winning the America East conference tournament and qualifying for the NCAA tournament for a second consecutive year.

== Roster ==
2010–11 Hartford Hawks women's basketball team
Players
Coaches

Pos.	#	Name	Height	Year	Previous school	Hometown
G	1	Jackie Smith	5 ft 9 in (1.75 m)	Sr	Holyoke	Westfield, MA
G	2	Daphne Elliott	5 ft 6 in (1.68 m)	So	Fairfield Warde	Fairfield, CT
F	3	Taylor Clark	6 ft 0 in (1.83 m)	Fr	Athens Area	Sayre, PA
G	10	Alex Hall	5 ft 7 in (1.7 m)	So	Pembroke Academy	Pembroke, NH
G/F	14	Amanda Weaver	6 ft 1 in (1.85 m)	Sr	York Catholic	York, PA
F	20	Keyokah Mars-Garrick	6 ft 1 in (1.85 m)	Jr	Wheeler	North Stonington, CT
G	21	Ilicia Mathis	5 ft 9 in (1.75 m)	Jr	Hill Regional Career	Hamden, CT
G	22	Mary Silvia	5 ft 11 in (1.8 m)	Sr	Reading Memorial	Reading, MA
G	23	Alyssa Englert	5 ft 9 in (1.75 m)	Fr	Wayland-Cohocton	Dansville, NY
F	24	Ruthanne Doherty	5 ft 11 in (1.8 m)	So	L. C. Bird	Richmond, VA
F	33	Milana Gilbert	6 ft 0 in (1.83 m)	Fr	Acad. of New Church	Smyrna, DE
F	44	Nikkia Smith	6 ft 1 in (1.85 m)	So	Montville	Montville, CT

Head coach

- Jennifer Rizzotti (Connecticut)

Assistant coach(es)

- Brian Mik (Southern Connecticut)
- Bill Sullivan (Connecticut)

Legend

- (C) Team captain
- (S) Suspended
- (I) Ineligible
- (W) Walk-on
- Injured
- Current redshirt

Roster
Last update: July 13, 2024

== Schedule ==
Date time, TV	Rank^{#}	Opponent^{#}	Result	Record	Site (attendance) city, state
Non-conference regular season
November 12, 2010*; 7:00 p.m.		at Central Connecticut; Rivalry	L 41–46	0–1	William H. Detrick Gymnasium; New Britain, CT
November 15, 2010*; 7:00 p.m.		at Boston College	L 66–93	0–2	Conte Forum; Chestnut Hill, MA
November 20, 2010*; 2:00 p.m.		Providence	L 53–75	0–3	Chase Arena at Reich Family Pavilion; West Hartford, CT
November 22, 2010*; 7:00 p.m.		Sacred Heart	W 62–53	1–3	Chase Arena at Reich Family Pavilion; West Hartford, CT
November 25, 2010*; 12:00 p.m.		vs. Green Bay; Caribbean Challenge	L 44–78	1–4	
November 26, 2010*; 12:00 p.m.		vs. Utah; Caribbean Challenge	L 45–51	1–5	
November 27, 2010*; 3:30 p.m.		vs. Penn State; Caribbean Challenge	L 65–71	1–6	
December 3, 2010*; 7:00 p.m.		at Harvard	L 61–85	1–7	Lavietes Pavilion; Boston, MA
December 7, 2010*; 7:00 p.m.		Marist	L 40–57	1–8	Chase Arena at Reich Family Pavilion; West Hartford, CT
December 10, 2010*; 7:00 p.m.		at Temple	L 45–63	1–9	McGonigle Hall; Philadelphia, PA
December 12, 2010*; 2:00 p.m.		Dartmouth	W 74–43	2–9	Chase Arena at Reich Family Pavilion; West Hartford, CT
December 22, 2010*; 2:00 p.m.		at Hofstra	L 51–65	2–10	Mack Sports Complex; Hempstead, NY
December 29, 2010*; 5:00 p.m.		at Coppin State	W 49–48	3–10	Physical Education Complex; Baltimore, MD
America East regular season
January 2, 2011; 1:00 p.m.		at Vermont	W 62–49	4–10 (1–0)	Patrick Gym; Burlington, VT
January 5, 2011; 7:00 p.m.		Maine	W 73–43	5–10 (2–0)	Chase Arena at Reich Family Pavilion; West Hartford, CT
January 8, 2011; 3:00 p.m.		Albany	L 43–46	5–11 (2–1)	Chase Arena at Reich Family Pavilion; West Hartford, CT
January 12, 2011; 7:00 p.m.		at New Hampshire	W 57–50	6–11 (3–1)	Lundholm Gym; Durham, NH
January 17, 2011; 7:00 p.m.		Binghamton	L 57–69	6–12 (3–2)	Chase Arena at Reich Family Pavilion; West Hartford, CT
January 20, 2011; 12:00 p.m.		at UMBC	L 60–67	6–13 (3–3)	Retriever Activities Center; Catonsville, MD
January 23, 2011; 2:00 p.m.		at Boston University	L 50–58	6–14 (3–4)	Case Gym; Boston, MA
January 26, 2011; 7:00 p.m.		Stony Brook	W 67–57	7–14 (4–4)	Chase Arena at Reich Family Pavilion; West Hartford, CT
February 2, 2011; 7:00 p.m.		Vermont	W 68–43	8–14 (5–4)	Chase Arena at Reich Family Pavilion; West Hartford, CT
February 5, 2011; 4:30 p.m.		at Albany	W 61–56	9–14 (6–4)	SEFCU Arena; Albany, NY
February 8, 2011; 7:00 p.m.		at Maine	W 62–49	10–14 (7–4)	Memorial Gymnasium; Orono, ME
February 13, 2011; 1:00 p.m.		Boston University	W 66–59	11–14 (8–4)	Chase Arena at Reich Family Pavilion; West Hartford, CT
February 17, 2011; 7:00 p.m.		at Binghamton	W 55–37	12–14 (9–4)	Binghamton University Events Center; Vestal, NY
February 20, 2011; 1:00 p.m.		UMBC	L 48–53	12–15 (9–5)	Chase Arena at Reich Family Pavilion; West Hartford, CT
February 23, 2011; 7:00 p.m.		at Stony Brook	W 67–63	13–15 (10–5)	Stony Brook University Arena; Stony Brook, NY
February 26, 2011; 3:00 p.m.		New Hampshire	W 62–52	14–15 (11–5)	Chase Arena at Reich Family Pavilion; West Hartford, CT
America East women's tournament
March 4, 2011; 8:30 p.m.	(4)	(5) Albany	W 48–43	15–15	Chase Arena at Reich Family Pavilion; West Hartford, CT
March 6, 2011; 1:30 p.m.	(4)	(1) UMBC	W 66–48	16–15	Chase Arena at Reich Family Pavilion; West Hartford, CT
March 12, 2011; 7:00 p.m.	(4)	(2) Boston University	W 65–53	17–15	Case Gym; Boston, MA
NCAA women's tournament
March 20, 2011; 12:05 p.m., ESPN2	(16)	vs. (1) UConn	L 39–75	17–16	Gampel Pavilion; Storrs, CT
*Non-conference game. ^{#}Rankings from AP poll. (#) Tournament seedings in parentheses. All times are in Eastern.
