= 2011–12 Hartford Hawks women's basketball team =

Intercollegiate basketball season

2011–12 Hartford Hawks women's basketball

UCF Thanksgiving Classic champions

WNIT, first round
- Conference: America East Conference
- Record: 19–13 (10–6 America East)
- Head coach: Jennifer Rizzotti (13th season)
- Assistant coach: Bill Sullivan
- Home arena: Chase Arena at Reich Family Pavilion

2011–12 America East Conference women's basketball standings
	Conf.				Overall
Team	W		L	PCT	W		L	PCT
Boston U.	15	–	1	.938	23	–	9	.719
Albany †	14	–	2	.875	23	–	10	.697
Hartford	10	–	6	.625	19	–	13	.594
New Hampshire	9	–	7	.563	16	–	14	.533
UMBC	9	–	7	.563	17	–	15	.531
Binghamton	6	–	10	.375	13	–	18	.419
Vermont	4	–	12	.250	10	–	20	.333
Maine	4	–	12	.250	8	–	23	.258
Stony Brook	1	–	15	.063	4	–	26	.133
† 2012 America East tournament winner

The 2011–12 Hartford Hawks women's basketball team represented the University of Hartford during the 2011–12 NCAA Division I women's basketball season. The team was led by head coach Jennifer Rizzotti who was entering her thirteenth season with Hartford. The team played their home games at Chase Arena at Reich Family Pavilion in West Hartford, Connecticut and were members of the America East Conference.

== Roster ==
2011–12 Hartford Hawks women's basketball team
Players
Coaches

Pos.	#	Name	Height	Year	Previous school	Hometown
G	2	Daphne Elliott	5 ft 6 in (1.68 m)	Jr	Fairfield Warde	Fairfield, CT
G	10	Alex Hall	5 ft 7 in (1.7 m)	Jr	Pembroke Academy	Pembroke, NH
F	13	Taylor Clark	6 ft 0 in (1.83 m)	So	Athens Area	Sayre, PA
F	15	Milana Gilbert	6 ft 0 in (1.83 m)	So	Acad. of New Church	Smyrna, DE
F	20	Keyokah Mars-Garrick	6 ft 1 in (1.85 m)	Sr	Wheeler	North Stonington, CT
G	21	Shanise Bultron	5 ft 8 in (1.73 m)	Fr	Tabor Academy	Watertown, MA
F	22	Katie Roth	6 ft 2 in (1.88 m)	Fr	Maple Hill	Castleton-on-Hudson, NY
G	23	Alyssa Englert	5 ft 9 in (1.75 m)	So	Wayland-Cohocton	Dansville, NY
F	24	Ruthanne Doherty	5 ft 11 in (1.8 m)	Jr	L.C. Bird	Richmond, VA
G	25	Amber Bepko	5 ft 9 in (1.75 m)	Fr	Mercy	Guilford, CT
F	31	Cherelle Moore	6 ft 0 in (1.83 m)	Fr	Kolbe Cathedral	Bridgeport, CT
F	44	Nikkia Smith	6 ft 1 in (1.85 m)	Jr	Montville	Montville, CT

Head coach

- Jennifer Rizzotti (Connecticut)

Assistant coach(es)

- Brian Mik (Southern Connecticut)
- Bill Sullivan (Connecticut)

Legend

- (C) Team captain
- (S) Suspended
- (I) Ineligible
- (W) Walk-on
- Injured
- Current redshirt

Roster
Last update: October 8, 2024

== Schedule ==
Date time, TV	Rank^{#}	Opponent^{#}	Result	Record	Site (attendance) city, state
Non-conference regular season
November 11, 2011*; 8:00 p.m.		Manhattan; WNIT	W 64–45	1–0	Chase Arena at Reich Family Pavilion; West Hartford, CT
November 13, 2011*; 4:00 p.m.		LIU Brooklyn; WNIT	W 54–45	2–0	Chase Arena at Reich Family Pavilion; West Hartford, CT
November 17, 2011*; 7:00 p.m.		at No. 2 Notre Dame; WNIT	L 43–98	2–1	Edmund P. Joyce Center; Notre Dame, IN
November 22, 2011*; 7:00 p.m.		Central Connecticut; Rivalry	W 65–56	3–1	Chase Arena at Reich Family Pavilion; West Hartford, CT
November 25, 2011*; 12:00 p.m.		vs. TCU; UCF Thanksgiving Classic	W 64–60	4–1	UCF Arena; Orlando, FL
November 26, 2011*; 2:30 p.m.		vs. UCF; UCF Thanksgiving Classic	W 55–46	5–1	UCF Arena; Orlando, FL
December 1, 2011*; 7:00 p.m.		at Marist	L 51–57	5–2	McCann Arena; Poughkeepsie, NY
December 4, 2011*; 1:00 p.m.		at St. John's	L 45–70	5–3	Carnesecca Arena; New York, NY
December 7, 2011*; 1:00 p.m.		Hofstra	W 61–59	6–3	Chase Arena at Reich Family Pavilion; West Hartford, CT
December 10, 2011*; 2:00 p.m.		Boston College	W 54–45	7–3	Chase Arena at Reich Family Pavilion; West Hartford, CT
December 12, 2011*; 4:00 p.m.		at Dartmouth	W 60–42	8–3	Leede Arena; Hanover, NH
December 22, 2011*; 2:00 p.m.		at Richmond	L 56–69	8–4	Robins Center; Richmond, VA
December 29, 2011*; 7:00 p.m.		Harvard	W 72–61	9–4	Chase Arena at Reich Family Pavilion; West Hartford, CT
December 31, 2011*; 1:00 p.m.		at Providence	L 46–63	9–5	Alumni Hall; Providence, RI
America East regular season
January 2, 2012; 7:00 p.m.		Albany	L 37–40	9–6 (0–1)	Chase Arena at Reich Family Pavilion; West Hartford, CT
January 5, 2012; 7:00 p.m.		at New Hampshire	L 45–64	9–7 (0–2)	Lundholm Gym; Durham, NH
January 7, 2012; 2:00 p.m.		Vermont	L 50–57	9–8 (0–3)	Chase Arena at Reich Family Pavilion; West Hartford, CT
January 14, 2012; 2:00 p.m.		at Binghamton	W 63–41	10–8 (1–3)	Binghamton University Events Center; Vestal, NY
January 16, 2012; 2:00 p.m.		at UMBC	L 59–71	10–9 (1–4)	Retriever Activities Center; Catonsville, MD
January 19, 2012; 7:00 p.m.		Maine	W 64–52	11–9 (2–4)	Chase Arena at Reich Family Pavilion; West Hartford, CT
January 22, 2012; 3:00 p.m.		at Boston University	L 46–53	11–10 (2–5)	Case Gym; Boston, MA
January 25, 2012; 7:00 p.m.		Stony Brook	W 63–44	12–10 (3–5)	Chase Arena at Reich Family Pavilion; West Hartford, CT
January 28, 2012; 3:00 p.m.		at Albany	W 65–57	13–10 (4–5)	SEFCU Arena; Albany, NY
February 1, 2012; 7:00 p.m.		New Hampshire	W 64–46	14–10 (5–5)	Chase Arena at Reich Family Pavilion; West Hartford, CT
February 5, 2012; 1:00 p.m.		at Vermont	W 63–52	15–10 (6–5)	Patrick Gym; Burlington, VT
February 11, 2012; 2:00 p.m.		Binghamton	W 67–58	16–10 (7–5)	Chase Arena at Reich Family Pavilion; West Hartford, CT
February 15, 2012; 7:00 p.m.		at Maine	W 59–40	17–10 (8–5)	Memorial Gymnasium; Orono, ME
February 19, 2012; 12:00 p.m.		UMBC	W 66–54	18–10 (9–5)	Chase Arena at Reich Family Pavilion; West Hartford, CT
February 22, 2012; 7:00 p.m.		at Stony Brook	W 49–42	19–10 (10–5)	Stony Brook University Arena; Stony Brook, NY
February 25, 2012; 4:00 p.m.		Boston University	L 52–57	19–11 (10–6)	Chase Arena at Reich Family Pavilion; West Hartford, CT
America East women's tournament
March 2, 2012; 8:15 p.m., ESPN3		Binghamton	L 45–48	19–12	Chase Arena at Reich Family Pavilion; West Hartford, CT
WNIT
March 16, 2012; 7:00 p.m.		vs. Syracuse; WNIT	L 42–59	19–13	Chase Arena at Reich Family Pavilion; West Hartford, CT
*Non-conference game. ^{#}Rankings from AP poll. (#) Tournament seedings in parentheses. All times are in Eastern.
