= 2012–13 Hartford Hawks women's basketball team =

Intercollegiate basketball season

2012–13 Hartford Hawks women's basketball

WNIT, First Round
- Conference: America East Conference
- Record: 21–12 (10–6 America East)
- Head coach: Jennifer Rizzotti (14th season)
- Assistant coach: Bill Sullivan
- Home arena: Chase Arena at Reich Family Pavilion

2012–13 America East Conference women's basketball standings
	Conf.				Overall
Team	W		L	PCT	W		L	PCT
Albany †	16	–	0	1.000	27	–	4	.871
Boston U.	13	–	2	.867	24	–	6	.800
Hartford	10	–	6	.625	21	–	12	.636
UMBC	6	–	10	.375	10	–	20	.333
Stony Brook	6	–	10	.375	12	–	18	.400
New Hampshire	6	–	10	.375	10	–	20	.333
Vermont	6	–	10	.375	10	–	21	.323
Binghamton	5	–	11	.313	6	–	24	.200
Maine	3	–	12	.200	4	–	24	.143
† 2013 America East tournament winner

The 2012–13 Hartford Hawks women's basketball team represented the University of Hartford during the 2012–13 NCAA Division I women's basketball season. Hartford was led by head coach Jennifer Rizzotti who was in her fourteenth season as head coach.

== Roster ==
2012–13 Hartford Hawks women's basketball team
Players
Coaches

Pos.	#	Name	Height	Year	Previous school	Hometown
G	2	Daphne Elliott	5 ft 6 in (1.68 m)	Sr	Fairfield Warde	Fairfield, CT
F	4	Christie Michals	6 ft 1 in (1.85 m)	Fr	Robinson Secondary	Fairfax, VA
G	5	Diamond Doe	5 ft 8 in (1.73 m)	Jr	Lynn Classical	Lynn, MA
G	10	Alex Hall	5 ft 7 in (1.7 m)	Sr	Pembroke Academy	Pembroke, NH
G	12	Katelyn Skinner	5 ft 10 in (1.78 m)	Fr	Homer Center	Homer City, PA
F	13	Taylor Clark	6 ft 0 in (1.83 m)	Jr	Athens Area	Sayre, PA
F	15	Milana Gilbert	6 ft 0 in (1.83 m)	Jr	Acad. of New Church	Smyrna, DE
G	21	Shanise Bultron	5 ft 8 in (1.73 m)	So	Tabor Academy	Watertown, MA
F	22	Katie Roth	6 ft 2 in (1.88 m)	RS Fr	Maple Hill	Castleton, NY
G	23	Alyssa Englert	5 ft 9 in (1.75 m)	Jr	Wayland-Cohocton	Dansville, NY
F	24	Ruthanne Doherty	5 ft 11 in (1.8 m)	Sr	L.C. Bird	Richmond, VA
G	25	Amber Bepko	5 ft 9 in (1.75 m)	So	Mercy	Guilford, CT
F	31	Cherelle Moore	6 ft 0 in (1.83 m)	So	Kolbe Cathedral	Bridgeport, CT
G	33	Mallory Shickora	5 ft 8 in (1.73 m)	Fr	Mount Saint Dominic Acad.	Little Falls, NJ
F	44	Nikkia Smith	6 ft 1 in (1.85 m)	Sr	Montville	Montville, CT

Head coach

- Jennifer Rizzotti (Connecticut)

Assistant coach(es)

- Brian Mik (Southern Connecticut)
- Bill Sullivan (Connecticut)

Legend

- (C) Team captain
- (S) Suspended
- (I) Ineligible
- (W) Walk-on
- Injured
- Current redshirt

Roster

== Schedule ==
Date time, TV	Rank^{#}	Opponent^{#}	Result	Record	Site (attendance) city, state
Non-conference regular season
Nov 9, 2012*; 7:00pm		Loyola	W 64–50	1–0	Chase Arena at Reich Family Pavilion; West Hartford, CT
Nov 13, 2012*; 7:00pm		Marist	W 64–53	2–0	Chase Arena at Reich Family Pavilion; West Hartford, CT
Nov 16, 2012*; 7:00pm		at Central Connecticut; Rivalry	W 76–62	3–0	William H. Detrick Gymnasium; New Britain, CT
Nov 18, 2012*; 2:00pm		Richmond	W 59–54	4–0	Chase Arena at Reich Family Pavilion; West Hartford, CT
Nov 21, 2012*; 7:00pm		at UMass	W 71–65	5–0	Mullins Center; Amherst, MA
Nov 25, 2012*; 2:00pm		St. John's	L 54–66	5–1	Chase Arena at Reich Family Pavilion; West Hartford, CT
Dec 1, 2012*; 2:00pm		Providence	W 66–39	6–1	Chase Arena at Reich Family Pavilion; West Hartford, CT
Dec 6, 2012*; 8:00pm		at Vanderbilt	L 45–67	6–2	Memorial Gymnasium; Nashville, TN
Dec 9 2012*; 2:00pm		at Dartmouth	W 67–52	7–2	Leede Arena; Hanover, NH
Dec 16, 2012*; 2:00pm		Quinnipiac	W 67–61	8–2	Chase Arena at Reich Family Pavilion; West Hartford, CT
Dec 16, 2012*; 1:00pm, SNY		No. 2 UConn	L 45–102	8–3	Chase Arena at Reich Family Pavilion; West Hartford, CT
Dec 28, 2012*; 2:30pm		vs. Maryland Eastern Shore; Terrapin Classic	W 53–38	9–3	Xfinity Center; College Park, MD
Dec 29, 2012*; 4:30pm		vs. No. 9 Maryland; Terrapin Classic	L 40–72	9–4	Xfinity Center; College Park, MD
America East regular season
Jan 2, 2013; 7:00pm		at Binghamton	L 44–46	9–5 (0–1)	Binghamton University Events Center; Vestal, NY
Jan 5, 2013; 2:00pm		Boston University	L 39–45	9–6 (0–2)	Chase Arena at Reich Family Pavilion; West Hartford, CT
Jan 9, 2013; 7:30pm		at Maine	W 52–37	10–6 (1–2)	Alfond Arena; Orono, ME
Jan 12, 2013; 2:00pm		Stony Brook	W 59–43	11–6 (2–2)	Chase Arena at Reich Family Pavilion; West Hartford, CT
Jan 16, 2013; 12:00pm		UMBC	W 51–44	12–6 (3–2)	Chase Arena at Reich Family Pavilion; West Hartford, CT
Jan 19, 2013; 2:00pm		at Albany	L 48–55	12–7 (3–3)	SEFCU Arena; Albany, NY
Jan 23, 2013; 7:00pm		New Hampshire	W 63–56	13–7 (4–3)	Chase Arena at Reich Family Pavilion; West Hartford, CT
Jan 30, 2013; 7:00pm		at Vermont	W 60–51	14–7 (5–3)	Patrick Gym; Burlington, VT
Feb 2, 2013; 12:00pm, NESN		at Boston University	L 40–42	14–8 (5–4)	Case Gym; Boston, MA
Feb 6, 2013; 7:00pm		Binghamton	W 65–50	15–8 (6–4)	Chase Arena at Reich Family Pavilion; West Hartford, CT
Feb 10, 2013; 3:00pm		at Stony Brook	W 60–44	16–8 (7–4)	Pritchard Gymnasium; Stony Brook, NY
Feb 13, 2013; 7:00pm, ESPN3		Maine	W 82–56	17–8 (8–4)	Chase Arena at Reich Family Pavilion; West Hartford, CT
Feb 17, 2013; 2:00pm, ESPN3		Albany	L 55–69	17–9 (8–5)	Chase Arena at Reich Family Pavilion; West Hartford, CT
Feb 20, 2013; 7:00pm		at New Hampshire	L 49–51	17–10 (8–6)	Lundholm Gym; Durham, NH
Feb 27, 2013; 7:00pm		at UMBC	W 69–62	18–10 (9–6)	Retriever Activities Center; Catonsville, MD
Mar 2, 2013; 2:00pm		Vermont	W 59–33	19–10 (10–6)	Chase Arena at Reich Family Pavilion; West Hartford, CT
America East Women's Tournament
Mar 8, 2013; 12:00pm		vs. No. 7 Binghamton	W 68–53	20–10	SEFCU Arena; Albany, NY
Mar 10, 2013; 11:00am		vs. No. 6 Vermont	W 64–33	21–10	SEFCU Arena; Albany, NY
Mar 16, 2013; ESPN3		vs. No. 1 Albany	L 52–61	21–11	SEFCU Arena; Albany, NY
WNIT
Mar 21, 2013; 7:00pm		vs. Harvard; WNIT	L 57–61	21–12	Chase Arena at Reich Family Pavilion; West Hartford, CT
*Non-conference game. ^{#}Rankings from AP Poll. (#) Tournament seedings in parentheses. All times are in Eastern Time.
