= 2009–10 Hartford Hawks women's basketball team =

Intercollegiate basketball season

2009–10 Hartford Hawks women's basketball

American East regular season champions

NCAA tournament, First Round
- Conference: America East Conference
- Record: 27–5 (16–0 America East)
- Head coach: Jennifer Rizzotti (11th season)
- Assistant coach: Bill Sullivan
- Home arena: Chase Arena at Reich Family Pavilion

2009–10 America East Conference women's basketball standings
	Conf.				Overall
Team	W		L	PCT	W		L	PCT
Hartford	16	–	0	1.000	27	–	5	.844
Vermont †	13	–	3	.813	27	–	7	.794
Boston U.	11	–	5	.688	16	–	15	.516
Stony Brook	7	–	9	.438	10	–	20	.333
Binghamton	7	–	9	.438	11	–	19	.367
UMBC	7	–	9	.438	13	–	17	.433
Albany	4	–	12	.250	11	–	19	.367
Maine	4	–	12	.250	8	–	21	.276
New Hampshire	3	–	13	.188	9	–	22	.290
† 2010 America East tournament winner

The 2009–10 Hartford Hawks women's basketball team represented the University of Hartford during the 2009–10 NCAA Division I women's basketball season. The team was coached by Jennifer Rizzotti. The 2009–10 season was one of the most successful seasons for Hartford, going undefeated in America East play and qualifying for the NCAA tournament for the fifth time in its history.

== Roster ==
2009–10 Hartford Hawks women's basketball team
Players
Coaches

Pos.	#	Name	Height	Year	Previous school	Hometown
G	1	Jackie Smith	5 ft 9 in (1.75 m)	Jr	Holyoke	Westfield, MA
G	2	Daphne Elliott	5 ft 6 in (1.68 m)	Fr	Fairfield Warde	Fairfield, CT
F/C	3	Kacey Pratt	6 ft 2 in (1.88 m)	Sr	Spencerport	Rochester, NY
G	10	Alex Hall	5 ft 7 in (1.7 m)	Fr	Pembroke Academy	Pembroke, NH
G/F	11	Jenna Peterson	5 ft 10 in (1.78 m)	Sr	Oakley	Oakley, ID
G/F	14	Amanda Weaver	6 ft 1 in (1.85 m)	Jr	York Catholic	York, PA
F	20	Keyokah Mars-Garrick	6 ft 1 in (1.85 m)	So	Wheeler	North Stonington, CT
G	21	Ilicia Mathis	5 ft 9 in (1.75 m)	So	Hill Regional Career	Hamden, CT
G	22	Mary Silvia	5 ft 11 in (1.8 m)	Jr	Reading Memorial	Reading, MA
F	24	Ruthanne Doherty	5 ft 11 in (1.8 m)	Fr	L.C. Bird	Richmond, VA
F	32	Erica Beverly	6 ft 0 in (1.83 m)	Sr	Kolbe Cathedral	Bridgeport, CT
F/C	40	Diana Delva	6 ft 2 in (1.88 m)	Sr	Westhill	Stamford, CT
F	42	Briana Winston	5 ft 10 in (1.78 m)	So	Harriton	Ardmore, PA
F	44	Nikkia Smith	6 ft 1 in (1.85 m)	Fr	Montville	Montville, CT

Head coach

- Jennifer Rizzotti (Connecticut)

Assistant coach(es)

- Brian Mik (Southern Connecticut)
- Bill Sullivan (Connecticut)

Legend

- (C) Team captain
- (S) Suspended
- (I) Ineligible
- (W) Walk-on
- Injured
- Current redshirt

Roster

== Schedule ==
Date time, TV	Rank^{#}	Opponent^{#}	Result	Record	Site (attendance) city, state
Non-conference regular season
Nov 14, 2009*; 4:30 pm, NESN		Quinnipiac	W 71–53	1–0	Chase Arena at Reich Family Pavilion (1,427); West Hartford, CT
Nov 17, 2009*; 7:00 pm		Louisville	W 62–50	2–0	Chase Arena at Reich Family Pavilion (2,017); West Hartford, CT
Nov 20, 2009*; 7:00 pm		at Providence	L 59–66	2–1	Alumni Hall (303); Providence, RI
Nov 22, 2009*; 2:00 pm		at Dartmouth	W 70–41	3–1	Leede Arena (622); Hanover, NH
Nov 28, 2009*; 2:00 pm		Temple	W 65–54	4–1	Chase Arena at Reich Family Pavilion (1,483); West Hartford, CT
Dec 1, 2009*; 7:00 pm		at Sacred Heart	W 68–53	5–1	William H. Pitt Center (701); Fairfield, CT
Dec 4, 2009*; 7:00 pm		at Saint Joseph's	W 72–66 ^{OT}	6–1	Hagan Arena (437); Philadelphia, PA
Dec 10, 2009*; 7:00pm		at UConn	L 45–80	6–2	XL Center (11,102); Hartford, CT
Dec 13, 2009*; 2:00 pm		Northeastern	W 68–63 ^{OT}	7–2	Chase Arena at Reich Family Pavilion (1,427); West Hartford, CT
Dec 19, 2009*; 7:30 pm		at Marist	L 47–68	7–3	(1,634)
Dec 21, 2009*; 7:00 pm		Coppin State	W 51–44	8–3	Chase Arena at Reich Family Pavilion (1,021); West Hartford, CT
Dec 30, 2009*; 7:00 pm		Bowling Green	W 65–60	9–3	Chase Arena at Reich Family Pavilion (1,247); West Hartford, CT
America East regular season
Jan 2, 2010; 4:00 pm		Stony Brook	W 65–38	10–3 (1–0)	Chase Arena at Reich Family Pavilion (1,353); West Hartford, CT
Jan 6, 2010; 5:00 pm		at UMBC	W 69–66	11–3 (2–0)	Retriever Activities Center (492); Catonsville, MD
Jan 9, 2010; 4:00 pm		at New Hampshire	W 72–45	12–3 (3–0)	Lundholm Gym (516); Durham, NH
Jan 16, 2010; 12:00 pm, NESN		at Binghamton	W 70–65	13–3 (4–0)	Binghamton University Events Center (1,347); Vestal, NY
Jan 18, 2010; 7:00 pm		Maine	W 76–39	14–3 (5–0)	Chase Arena at Reich Family Pavilion (1,180); West Hartford, CT
Jan 21, 2010; 7:00pm		at Boston University	W 52–44	15–3 (6–0)	Case Gym (489); Boston, MA
Jan 24, 2010; 2:00pm		Albany	W 59–36	16–3 (7–0)	Chase Arena at Reich Family Pavilion (1,642); West Hartford, CT
Jan 26, 2010; 7:00pm, NESN		at Vermont	W 38–36	17–3 (8–0)	Patrick Gym (1,216); Burlington, VT
Jan 30, 2010; 4:00pm		at Stony Brook	W 60–42	18–3 (9–0)	Stony Brook University Arena (412); Stony Brook, NY
Feb 2, 2010; 7:00pm		UMBC	W 86–45	19–3 (10–0)	Chase Arena at Reich Family Pavilion (1,116); West Hartford, CT
Feb 6, 2010; 4:00pm		New Hampshire	W 65–35	20–3 (11–0)	Chase Arena at Reich Family Pavilion (1,823); West Hartford, CT
Feb 9, 2010; 7:00pm		at Maine	W 59–32	21–3 (12–0)	Alfond Arena (1,231); Orono, ME
Feb 18, 2010; 7:00		Binghamton	W 72–54	22–3 (13–0)	Chase Arena at Reich Family Pavilion (1,477); West Hartford, CT
Feb 21, 2010; 2:00pm		Boston University	W 61–38	23–3 (14–0)	Chase Arena at Reich Family Pavilion (2,553); West Hartford, CT
Feb 24, 2010; 7:00pm		at Albany	W 63–57	24–3 (15–0)	SEFCU Arena; Albany, NY
Feb 27, 2010; 4:00pm		Vermont	W 61–51	25–3 (16–0)	Chase Arena at Reich Family Pavilion (2,698); West Hartford, CT
America East Women's Tournament
Mar 5, 2010; 6:00pm	(1)	(9) New Hampshire	W 68–35	26–3	Chase Arena at Reich Family Pavilion (2,234); West Hartford, CT
Mar 7, 2010; 1:30pm	(1)	(4) Stony Brook	W 65–43	27–3	Chase Arena at Reich Family Pavilion (2,583); West Hartford, CT
Mar 13, 2010; 8:00pm	(1)	(2) Vermont	L 50–55	27–4	Chase Arena at Reich Family Pavilion (2,253); West Hartford, CT
NCAA Women's Tournament
Mar 20, 2010; 12:06pm, ESPN2	(10)	vs. (7) LSU	L 39–60	27–5	Cameron Indoor Stadium (3,084); Durham, NC
*Non-conference game. ^{#}Rankings from AP Poll. (#) Tournament seedings in parentheses. All times are in Eastern Time.
