= Hartford Hawks women's basketball =

- University: University of Hartford
- Head coach: Jackie Smith (1st season)
- Location: West Hartford, Connecticut
- Arena: Chase Arena at Reich Family Pavilion (capacity: 4,017)
- Conference: Conference of New England
- Nickname: Hawks
- Colors: Scarlet and white
- All-time record: 619–737 (.456)

NCAA Division I tournament round of 32
- 2006, 2008

NCAA Division I tournament appearances
- 2002, 2005, 2006, 2008, 2010, 2011

Conference tournament champions
- 2002, 2005, 2006, 2008, 2011

Conference regular-season champions
- 2006, 2007, 2008, 2010

Uniforms
Home	Away

The Hartford Hawks women's basketball team is the basketball team that represents the University of Hartford in West Hartford, Connecticut, United States. The school's team currently competes as in the NCAA Division III Conference of New England.

== History ==
The school began the women's basketball team in 1975 as a Division III school. The program moved to Division II and was a member of the Northeast-10 Conference (originally Northeast-7) between 1980 and 1984. The school transitioned to Division I in 1984, playing as an independent school in 1984–85, and then becoming part of the Seaboard Conference in 1985–86. The Seaboard Conference became the North Atlantic Conference in 1989, and changed their name to America East in 1996.

=== 2000s ===
Hartford's most successful run came in the early and mid 2000s under head coach Jen Rizzotti who was hired in 1999. Under Rizzotti, Hartford made 6 NCAA tournament appearances. In 2006 Hartford knocked of the sixth seeded Temple Owls in the first round advancing to the round of the 32 for the first time in program history. Hartford has continued its success under current head coach Kim McNeill, making the 2018 America East championship game.

=== Division III ===
On May 6, 2021, the University of Hartford Board of Regents voted to drop its athletic department to Division III. The drop is set to take place no later than September 1, 2025.

== Year by year results ==
Season	Coach	Overall	Conference	Standing	Postseason
Nancy Lauritis (DIII) (1975–1976)
1975–76	Nancy Lauritis	2–6			
Nancy Lauritis:		2–6			
Roger Wickman (DIII, DII) (1976–1984)
1976–77	Roger Wickman	11–2			
1977–78	Roger Wickman	11–2			
1978–79	Roger Wickman	8–8			
1979–80	Roger Wickman	14–3			
1980–81	Roger Wickman	8–11			
1981–82	Roger Wickman	7–14			
1982–83	Roger Wickman	5–18			
1983–84	Roger Wickman	3–20			
Roger Wickman:		67–78			
Carlos Aldave (Independent/America East Conference) (1984–1986)
1984–85	Carlos Aldave	6–18			
Division I
1985–86	Carlos Aldave	3–23	1–11	7th	
Carlos Aldave:		9–41	1–11		
Jean Walling Murphy (America East) (1986–1990)
1986–87	Jean Walling Murphy	7–18	3–11	7th	
1987–88	Jean Walling Murphy	9–18	6–8	5th	
1988–89	Jean Walling Murphy	4–19	4–8	7th	
1989–90	Jean Walling Murphy	4–22	2–10	T-6th	
Jean Walling Murphy:		24–77	15–37		
Mark Schmidt (America East) (1990–1992)
1990–91	Mark Schmidt	11–18	5–5	4th	
1991–92	Mark Schmidt	9–19	2–12	8th	
Mark Schmidt:		20–37	7–17		
Allison Jones (America East) (1992–1999)
1992–93	Allison Jones	11–16	6–8	5th	
1993–94	Allison Jones	9–18	2–12	8th	
1994–95	Allison Jones	7–20	2–14	9th	
1995–96	Allison Jones	15–13	10–8	4th	
1996–97	Allison Jones	15–12	12–6	4th	
1997–98	Allison Jones	11–16	20–8	T-4th	
1998–99	Allison Jones	8–19	5–13	9th	
Allison Jones:		76–114	47–69		
Jennifer Rizzotti (America East) (1999–2016)
1999–00	Jennifer Rizzotti	14–14	9–9	5th	
2000–01	Jennifer Rizzotti	15–14	9–9	4th	
2001–02	Jennifer Rizzotti	16–15	9–7	5th	NCAA first round
2002–03	Jennifer Rizzotti	7–21	5–11	8th	
2003–04	Jennifer Rizzotti	18–12	9–9	4th	
2004–05	Jennifer Rizzotti	22–9	13–5	2nd	NCAA first round
2005–06	Jennifer Rizzotti	27–4	15–1	1st	NCAA second round
2006–07	Jennifer Rizzotti	25–9	15–1	1st	WNIT Second Round
2007–08	Jennifer Rizzotti	28–6	14–2	1st	NCAA second round
2008–09	Jennifer Rizzotti	20–12	14–2	2nd	WNIT Second Round
2009–10	Jennifer Rizzotti	27–5	16–0	1st	NCAA first round
2010–11	Jennifer Rizzotti	17–15	11–5	4th	NCAA first round
2011–12	Jennifer Rizzotti	19–13	10–6	3rd	WNIT First Round
2012–13	Jennifer Rizzotti	21–12	10–6	3rd	WNIT First Round
2013–14	Jennifer Rizzotti	13–18	9–7	5th	
2014–15	Jennifer Rizzotti	16–17	8–8	5th	
2015–16	Jennifer Rizzotti	11–19	7–9	6th	
Jennifer Rizzotti:		316–216	183–97		
Kim McNeill (America East) (2016–2019)
2016–17	Kim McNeill	17–14	7–9	6th	
2017–18	Kim McNeill	19–13	9–7	6th	
2018–19	Kim McNeill	23–11	14–2	2nd	WNIT First Round
Kim McNeill:		59–38	30–18		
Morgan Valley (America East) (2019–2021)
2019–20	Morgan Valley	1–28	1–15	8th	
2020–21	Morgan Valley	3–9	3–9	T-9th	
Morgan Valley:		4–37	4–24		
Melissa L. Hodgdon (America East) (2021–2022)
2021–22	Melissa L. Hodgdon	4–26	4–14		
Melissa L. Hodgdon:		4–26	4–14		
Polly Thomason (Independent) (2022–2023)
2022–23	Polly Thomason	2–25	0–0		
Division III
Polly Thomason (Commonwealth Coast Conference) (2023–2024)
2023–24	Polly Thomason	11–14	7–11		
Polly Thomason (Conference of New England) (2024–present)
2024–25	Polly Thomason	10–16	8–10	6th	
Polly Thomason:		23–55	15–21		
Total:		590–683			
National champion Postseason invitational champion Conference regular season champion Conference regular season and conference tournament champion Division regular season champion Division regular season and conference tournament champion Conference tournament champion

== Postseason ==
=== NCAA Division I tournament results ===
The Hawks appeared in the NCAA Division I women's basketball tournament six times. Their record is 2–6.

Year	Seed	Round	Opponent	Result
2002	(16)	First Round	(1) Oklahoma	L 52–84
2005	(14)	First Round	(3) Rutgers	L 37–62
2006	(11)	First Round; Second Round	(6) Temple (3) Georgia	W 64–58; L 54–73
2008	(10)	First Round; Second Round	(7) Syracuse (2) Texas A&M	W 59–55; L 39–63
2010	(10)	First Round	(7) LSU	L 39–60
2011	(16)	First Round	(1) Connecticut	L 39–75

=== WNIT results ===
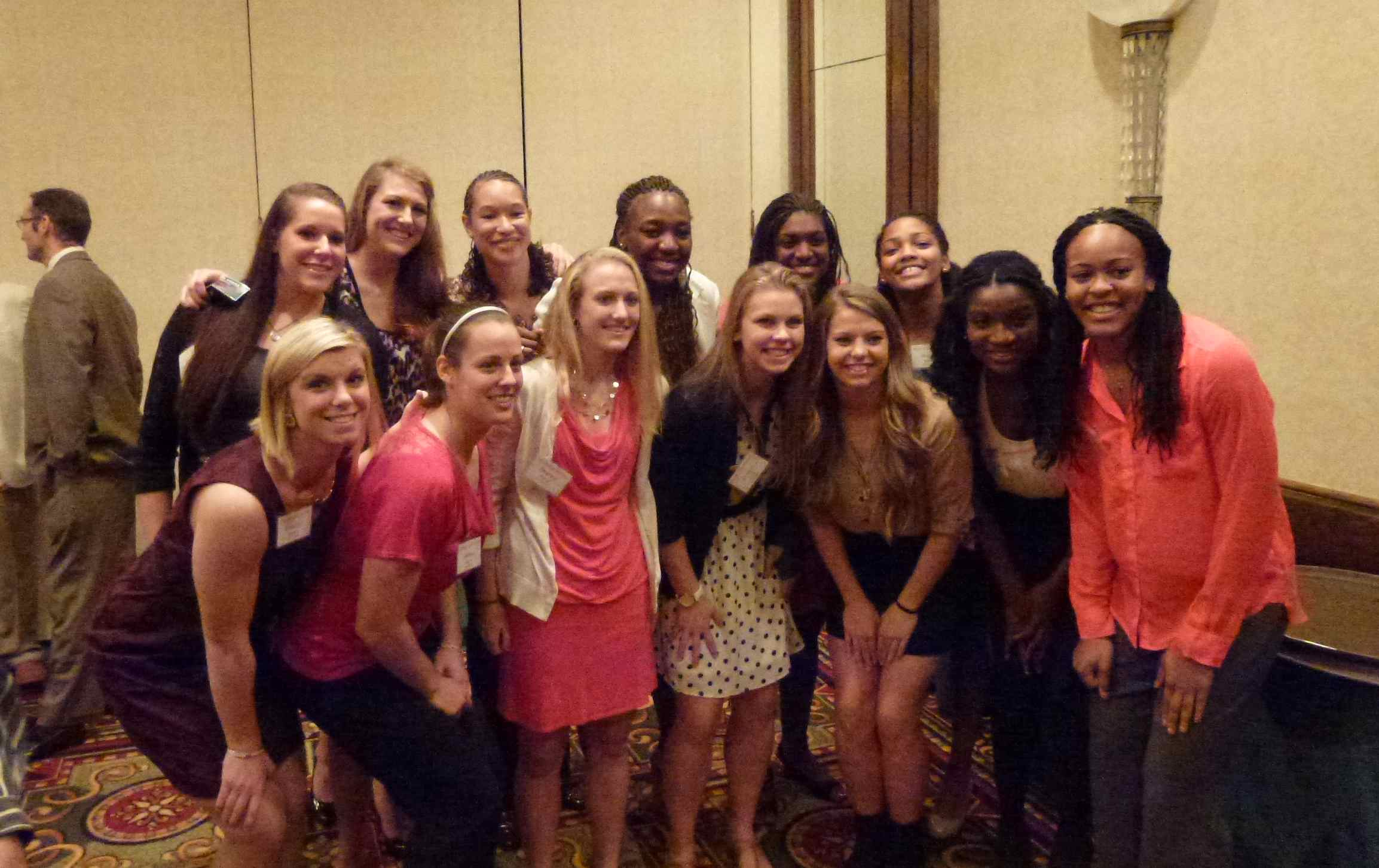
Players of the 2013–14 Hartford team

Year	Round	Opponent	Result
2007	First Round; Second Round	Bucknell; South Carolina	W 70–54; L 40–81
2009	Second Round	St. John's	L 59–70
2012	First Round	Syracuse	L 42–59
2013	First Round	Harvard	L 57–61
2019	First Round	Providence	L 54–71

== Notable players ==
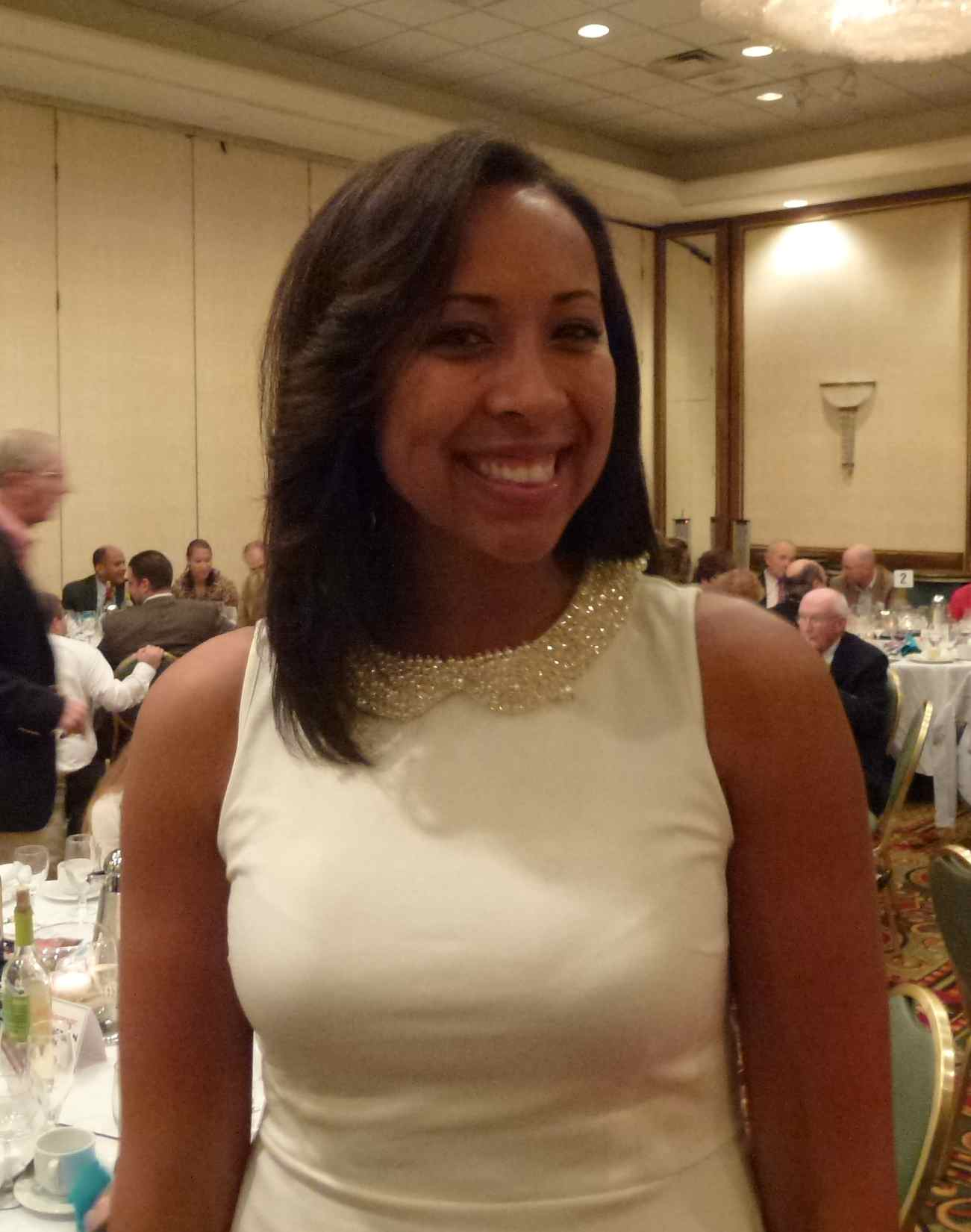
Danielle Hood, basketball player for the University of Hartford women's basketball team. Taken at fundraiser, where she was the featured speaker.

- Danielle Hood, played 2004–2008. Was drafted by the Atlanta Dream as the 32nd pick of the 2008 draft. Although she did not make the final roster, she is the first player from Hartford, and only the second player from an America East Conference team to be drafted by the WNBA.
- Liz Stich, played 2001–2005. Coached Plymouth State University from 2012–2015. She was inducted into the New England Basketball Hall of Fame in 2013.
- Erica Beverly, played 2005–2010. She was inducted to the New England Basketball Hall of Fame.

== Head coaches ==
- Nancy Lauritis (1975–1976)
- Roger Wickman (1976–1984)
- Carlos Aldave (1984–1986)
- Jean Walling Murphy (1986–1990)
- Mark Schmidt (1990–1992)
- Allison Jones (1992–1999)
- Jennifer Rizzotti (1999–2016)
- Kim McNeill (2016–2019)
- Morgan Valley (2019–2021)
- Melissa Hodgdon (2021–2022)
- Polly Thomason (2022–2025)
- Jackie Smith (2025–present)
