= 2001–02 Hartford Hawks women's basketball team =

Intercollegiate basketball season

2001–02 Hartford Hawks women's basketball

America East tournament champions

NCAA tournament, First Round
- Conference: America East Conference
- Record: 16–15 (9–7 America East)
- Head coach: Jennifer Rizzotti (3rd season)
- Assistant coach: Bill Sullivan
- Home arena: Chase Arena at Reich Family Pavilion

2001–02 America East Conference women's basketball standings
| | Conf. | | | | Overall |
| Team | W | | L | PCT | W | | L | PCT |
|---|---|---|---|---|---|---|---|---|
| Vermont | 14 | – | 2 | .875 | 23 | – | 9 | .719 |
| Boston U. | 10 | – | 6 | .625 | 17 | – | 11 | .607 |
| Binghamton | 10 | – | 6 | .625 | 19 | – | 9 | .679 |
| Maine | 9 | – | 7 | .563 | 16 | – | 12 | .571 |
| Hartford † | 9 | – | 7 | .563 | 16 | – | 15 | .516 |
| New Hampshire | 9 | – | 7 | .563 | 16 | – | 13 | .552 |
| Stony Brook | 7 | – | 9 | .438 | 16 | – | 14 | .533 |
| Northeastern | 4 | – | 12 | .250 | 6 | – | 22 | .214 |
| Albany | 0 | – | 16 | .000 | 4 | – | 23 | .148 |
† 2002 America East tournament winner

The 2001–02 Hartford Hawks women's basketball team represented the University of Hartford during the 2001–02 NCAA Division I women's basketball season. The team was coached by Jennifer Rizzotti. This was the first season the women's basketball team qualified for the NCAA tournament.

== Schedule ==
| Date time, TV | Rank^{#} | Opponent^{#} | Result | Record | Site (attendance) city, state |
Non-conference regular season
| Nov 16, 2001* | | at George Mason | L 68–79 | 0–1 | Patriot Center (287); Fairfax, VA |
| Nov 17, 2001* | | at George Washington | L 61–70 | 0–2 | Charles E. Smith Athletic Center (1,094); Washington, D.C. |
| Nov 20, 2001* | | Dartmouth | L 73–79 | 0–3 | Chase Arena (728); West Hartford, CT |
| Nov 23, 2001* | | vs. Eastern Washington; Atlanta Marriott NW Classic | L 50–67 | 0–4 | Alexander Memorial Coliseum (1,390); Atlanta, GA |
| Nov 24, 2001* | | vs. UNC Ashville; Atlanta Marriott NW Classic | W 89–51 | 1–4 | Alexander Memorial Coliseum (1,220); Atlanta, GA |
| Dec 1, 2001* | | Yale | L 47–48 | 1–5 | (847) |
| Dec 8, 2001* | | Fairleigh Dickinson | W 66–49 | 2–5 | (1,360) |
| Dec 12, 2001* | | at Central Connecticut; Rivalry | W 61–36 | 3–5 | William H. Detrick Gymnasium (370); New Britain, CT |
| Dec 16, 2001* | | Rhode Island | W 62–59 | 4–5 | Chase Arena (1,196); West Hartford, CT |
| Dec 28, 2001* | | vs. Clemson | L 46–60 | 4–6 | Mohegan Sun Arena (3,349); Uncasville, CT |
| Jan 5, 2002 | | at Northeastern | W 69–59 | 5–6 (1–0) | Solomon Court (406); Boston, MA |
| Jan 7, 2002 | | at Boston University | L 58–66 | 5–7 (1–1) | Case Gym (198); Boston, MA |
| Jan 10, 2002 | | New Hampshire | W 69–41 | 6–7 (2–1) | Chase Arena (879); West Hartford, CT |
| Jan 14, 2002* | | at Holy Cross | L 62–76 | 6–8 | Hart Center (1,782); Worcester, MA |
| Jan 17, 2002 | | Maine | L 49–58 | 6–9 (2–2) | Chase Arena (954); West Hartford, CT |
| Jan 20, 2002 | | at Vermont | W 66–63 | 7–9 (3–2) | Patrick Gym (1,771); Burlington, VT |
| Jan 23, 2002 | | at New Hampshire | L 67–79 | 7–10 (3–3) | Lundholm Gym (303); Durham, NH |
| Jan 26, 2002 | | at Stony Brook | L 66–75 | 7–11 (3–4) | Stony Brook University Arena (563); Stony Brook, NY |
| Jan 30, 2002 | | Boston University | L 41–50 | 7–12 (3–5) | Chase Arena (986); West Hartford, CT |
| Feb 6, 2002 | | Northeastern | W 78–58 | 8–12 (4–5) | Chase Arena (768); West Hartford, CT |
| Feb 9, 2002 | | Binghamton | W 55–49 | 9–12 (5–5) | Chase Arena (1,340); West Hartford, CT |
| Feb 11, 2002 | | at Albany | W 74–68 | 10–12 (6–5) | Recreation and Convocation Center (311); Guilderland, NY |
| Feb 15, 2002 | | Stony Brook | W 56–46 | 11–12 (7–5) | Chase Arena (1,172); West Hartford, CT |
| Feb 17, 2002 | | at Binghamton | L 72–78 | 11–13 (7–6) | (1,161); Vestal, NY |
| Feb 22, 2002 | | Albany | W 71–36 | 12–13 (8–6) | Chase Arena (1,567); West Hartford, CT |
| Feb 24, 2002 | | Vermont | L 57–65 | 12–14 (8–7) | (1,303); West Hartford, CT |
| Mar 2, 2002 | | at Maine | W 72–58 | 13–14 (9–7) | Alfond Arena (2,198); Orono, ME |
America East Women's Tournament
| Mar 7, 2002 | | Maine | W 59–55 | 14–14 | Chase Arena (2,414); West Hartford, CT |
| Mar 8, 2002 | | Vermont | W 60–59 | 15–14 | Chase Arena (2,369); West Hartford, CT |
| Mar 9, 2002 | | Stony Brook | W 50–47 | 16–14 | Chase Arena (2,811); West Hartford, CT |
NCAA Women's Tournament
| Mar 16, 2002*; 8:30pm | (16 W) | vs. (1 W) No. 4 Oklahoma; First Round | L 52–84 | 16–15 | Lloyd Noble Center (11,200); Norman, OK |
*Non-conference game. ^{#}Rankings from AP Poll. (#) Tournament seedings in parentheses. W=West. All times are in Eastern Time.
