= Ann Wauters =

Belgian basketball player (born 1980)

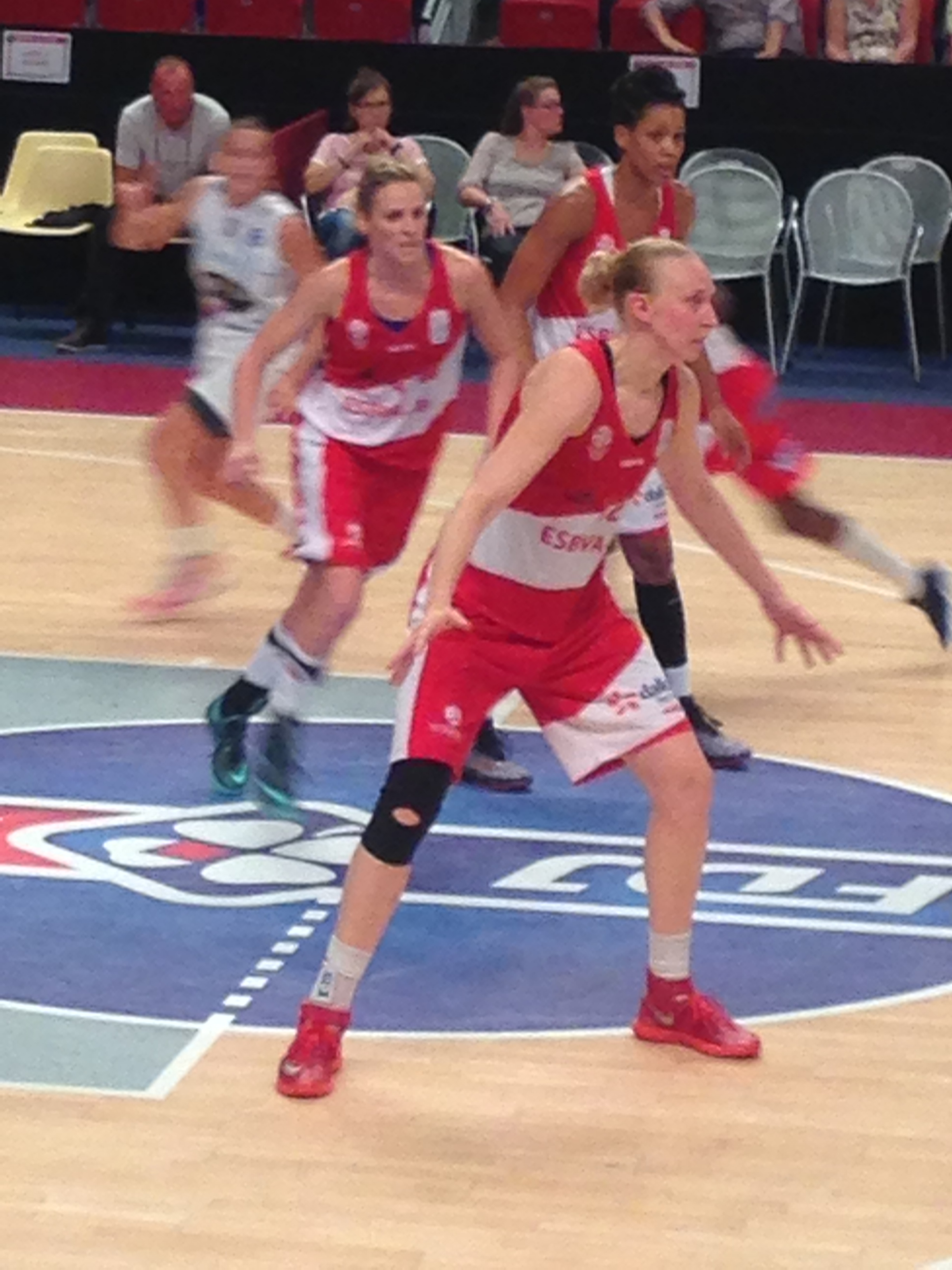

Personal information
- Born: 12 October 1980 (age 46) Sint-Gillis-Waas, Belgium
- Listed height: 6 ft 4 in (1.93 m)
- Listed weight: 195 lb (88 kg)

Career information
- WNBA draft: 2000: 1st round, 1st overall pick
- Drafted by: Cleveland Rockers
- Playing career: 1999–2021
- Position: Center
- Number: 12, 21
- Coaching career: 2022–present

Career history

Playing
- 1999–2004: US Valenciennes Olympic
- 2000–2002: Cleveland Rockers
- 2003: Samsung Life Bichumi
- 2004–2005: New York Liberty
- 2006: Samsung Life Bichumi
- 2004–2007: VBM-SGAU Samara
- 2007–2009: WBC CSKA Moscow
- 2008–2009: San Antonio Silver Stars
- 2009–2010: UMMC Ekaterinburg
- 2011–2012: Ros Casares Valencia
- 2012: Seattle Storm
- 2012–2013: Galatasaray S.K.
- 2013–2014: UMMC Ekaterinburg
- 2014–2015: ESB Villeneuve-d'Ascq
- 2015–2016: Royal Castors Braine
- 2016: Galatasaray S.K.
- 2016: Los Angeles Sparks
- 2016–2017: AGÜ Spor
- 2017: Yakin Dogu
- 2019–2020: Kayseri Basketbol

Coaching
- 2022–2023: Chicago Sky (assistant)

Career highlights
- WNBA champion (2016); WNBA All-Star (2005); 4× EuroLeague champion (2002, 2004, 2005, 2012); 2× Russian National League champion (2010, 2014); 3× Russian Cup winner (2008, 2010, 2014); EuroCup winner (2015); Spanish National League champion (2012); Turkish Cup winner (2013); Belgian National League champion (2016); Korean National League champion (2006); 4× French National League champion (2001–2004); 4× French Cup winner (2001–2004); World League champion (2004); EuroLeague Legacy Award (2026)

Career WNBA statistics
- Points: 2,174 (9.9 ppg)
- Rebounds: 1,111 (5.1 rpg)
- Assists: 293 (1.3 apg)
- Stats at Basketball Reference

Ann Hilde Willy Wauters (born 12 October 1980) is a Belgian former professional basketball player and coach, most recently serving as an assistant coach for the Chicago Sky in the Women's National Basketball Association (WNBA). She played for numerous American and European professional teams, including the Cleveland Rockers, US Valenciennes Olympic, and the San Antonio Silver Stars. She won four EuroLeague championships and one WNBA Finals during her career. Her primary position was center.

== Early life ==
Born in Sint-Gillis-Waas, Belgium, Wauters began playing basketball at age 12. Her international professional basketball career began immediately after high school. She speaks Dutch, French and English. She wears jersey No. 12 because of her birthdate.

== Professional career ==
=== WNBA ===
Wauters was drafted first overall in the 2000 WNBA draft by the Cleveland Rockers at the age of 19, becoming the youngest player in the league at the time. She was also the first Belgian-born player in the WNBA. When the team selected her, she was considered a project and raw talent. Having only played basketball for 7 years prior to the draft, Wauters quickly blended in with the big-name centers.

In her rookie season, Wauters was a reserve on the Rockers' roster, averaging 6.7 ppg off the bench. The Rockers were second in the East with a 17–15 record, and were one win away from advancing to the Finals, but were defeated in 3 games by the New York Liberty in the Conference Finals.

After her second season, Wauters sat out the 2003 WNBA season in order to rest. The Rockers folded in 2003 and Wauters was moved to the New York Liberty the following year in a dispersal draft. She played two seasons for the Liberty before taking another break from the WNBA in 2006. During her time with the Liberty, she was selected to play in the 2005 WNBA All-Star Game as a reserve.

In 2008, Wauters returned to the WNBA and was selected by the Atlanta Dream in the expansion draft.

On 9 April 2008, Wauters, along with Morenike Atunrase and a 2009 second-round draft pick, was traded to the San Antonio Silver Stars for Camille Little, Chioma Nnamaka, and the Silver Stars' first-round pick in the 2009 WNBA draft. During her first season with the Silver Stars, she averaged a career-high 14.7 ppg as the team's starting center. Playing alongside Becky Hammon, the Silver Stars were also a championship contender in 2008, having finished first in the West with a 24–10 record and advancing all the way to the Finals but would get swept by the Detroit Shock.

Wauters played for the Silver Stars once again in 2009, but decided not to rejoin the team in 2010 to take another break; she also did not join the team in 2011 as she became pregnant. In 2012, Wauters signed with the Seattle Storm. Wauters did not rejoin the Storm for the 2013 WNBA season in order to spend time with her family. After a 3-year break from the WNBA, Wauters signed with the Los Angeles Sparks in 2016 and won her first WNBA Championship with the team after defeating the Minnesota Lynx in the Finals.

=== Overseas ===
Throughout her basketball career, Wauters has gained more overseas experience than any other female player. Prior to her WNBA career, she played in France for USV Olympic. After her rookie season in the WNBA, she played with the team for four more years during the off-season and won four consecutive championships. From 2004 to 2007, Wauters played in Russia for VBM-SGAU and won a championship. From 2007 to 2009, Wauters played two off-seasons for CSKA Moscow. In the 2009–10 off-season, Wauters played for UMMC Ekaterinburg and won a championship with the team. In the 2011–12 off-season, Wauters played in Spain for Ros Casares Valencia, winning two championships with the team. In the 2012–13 off-season, Wauters played in Turkey for Galatasaray S.K. and won a Turkish Cup with the team. In the 2013–14 off-season, Wauters returned to UMMC Ekaterinburg and won her second Russian League championship with the team. In the 2014–15 off-season, Wauters played in France for ESB Villeneuve-d'Ascq, winning a EuroCup championship with the team. In the 2015–16 off-season, Wauters played in her home country for Royal Castors Braine in the first portion of the off-season and spent the second portion of the off-season playing for Galatasaray S.K. As of May 2016, Wauters signed with AGÜ Spor of the Turkish League for the 2016–17 off-season. In June 2017, Wauters signed with Yakin Dogu. She played for Kayseri Basketbol in the 2019–2020 season.

== WNBA career statistics ==
Legend
GP	Games played	GS	Games started	MPG	Minutes per game	RPG	Rebounds per game
APG	Assists per game	SPG	Steals per game	BPG	Blocks per game	PPG	Points per game
TO	Turnovers per game	FG%	Field-goal percentage	3P%	3-point field-goal percentage	FT%	Free-throw percentage
**Bold**	Career best	°	League leader

=== Regular season ===
Year	Team	GP	GS	MPG	FG%	3P%	FT%	RPG	APG	SPG	BPG	TO	PPG
2000	Cleveland	**32**	0	18.7	.523	.000	.741	4.0	1.2	0.6	0.7	1.9	6.2
2001	Cleveland	24	14	25.9	**.569**	.000	.800	4.8	1.5	0.7	0.5	2.0	9.8
2002	Cleveland	28	25	28.6	.553	.000	**.851**	5.0	1.4	0.5	0.7	2.1	11.2
2004	New York	13	4	20.8	.439	.333	.793	3.1	1.6	0.3	0.6	1.6	6.3
2005	New York	28	28	**31.4**	.541	**1.000**	.752	6.6	1.5	0.6	0.8	2.5	13.7
2008	San Antonio	**32**	**31**	30.6	.553	.355	.714	**7.5**	**1.8**	**1.1**	**1.1**	2.1	**14.7**
2009	San Antonio	17	16	27.2	.548	.167	.673	5.6	1.1	0.7	0.3	2.5	12.9
2012	Seattle	25	17	23.0	.519	.450	.737	5.8	1.4	0.5	0.7	2.2	9.6
2016	Los Angeles	21	1	4.6	.545	.000	.750	1.1	0.4	0.1	0.1	**0.3**	1.4
Career	9 years, 5 teams	220	136	24.0	.536	.358	.759	5.0	1.3	0.7	0.7	2.0	9.9

=== Postseason ===
Year	Team	GP	GS	MPG	FG%	3P%	FT%	RPG	APG	SPG	BPG	TO	PPG
2000	Cleveland	6	0	17.8	.481	.000	.333	3.0	0.8	0.5	0.5	1.3	4.7
2001	Cleveland	3	3	28.7	.489	.000	**.889**	3.3	0.7	**0.6**	1.0	1.3	11.3
2008	San Antonio	**9**	**9**	**33.3**	.444	**.083**	**.889**	5.8	1.6	**0.6**	**1.3**	1.8	**13.4**
2009	San Antonio	3	3	27.3	.389	.000	.800	**7.7**	**3.3**	0.0	0.0	1.3	10.7
2012	Seattle	3	0	12.7	.250	.000	.500	2.3	1.0	0.3	0.3	**0.0**	2.7
2016	Los Angeles	2	0	2.3	**.500**	.000	.000	1.0	0.0	0.0	0.5	0.5	1.0
Career	6 years, 4 teams	26	15	23.8	.451	.067	.784	4.3	1.3	0.5	0.8	1.3	8.7

== Coaching career ==
In January 2022, the Chicago Sky announced that they had hired Wauters as an assistant coach.

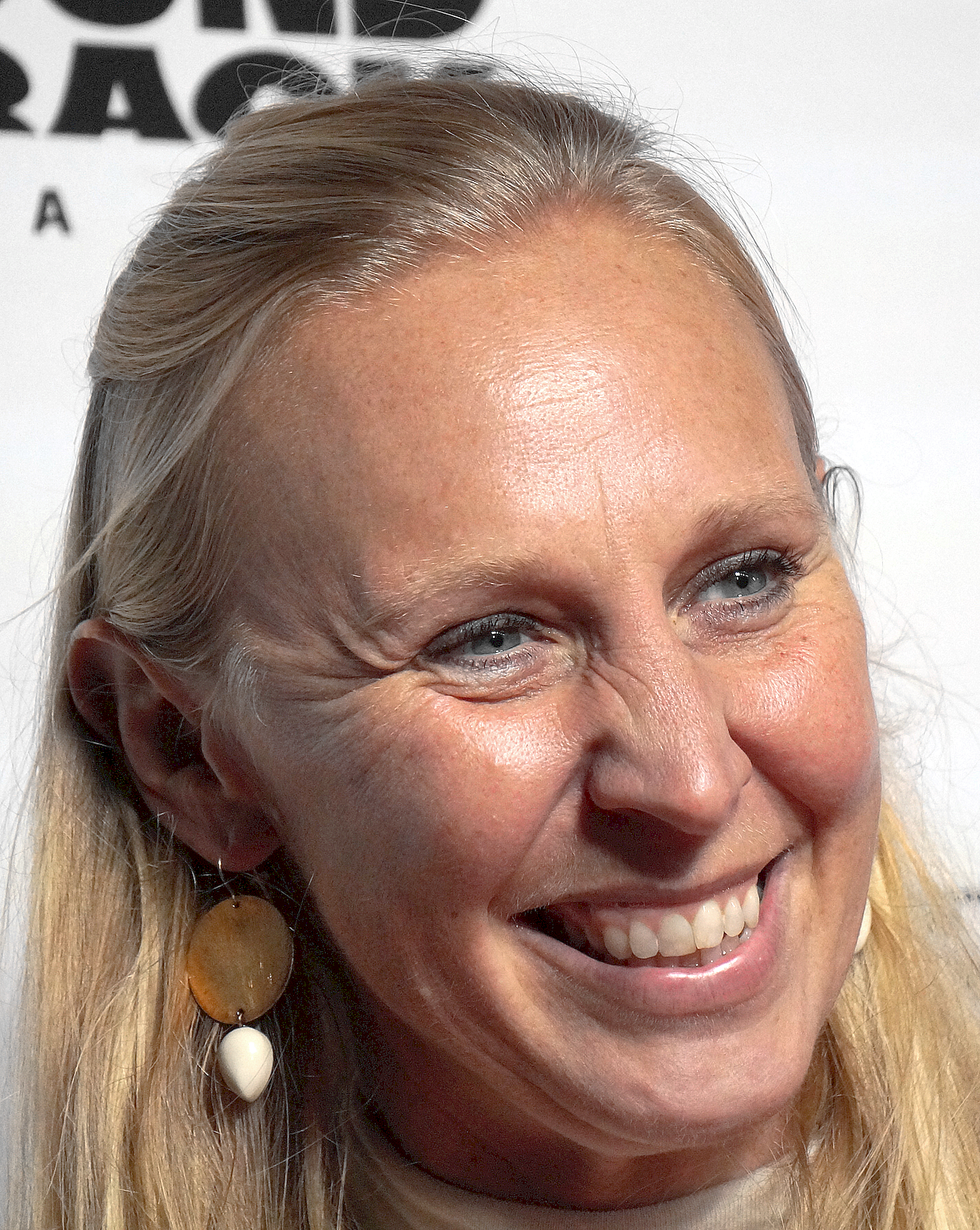
Wauters in 2024

== Personal life ==
In November 2010, Wauters' management announced she was 3 months pregnant with her first child, adding that this would not mean the end of her career. After the birth of her child, Wauters signed with Ros Casares Valencia in Spain. Her wife, Lot Wielfaert, was also pregnant and gave birth a month before Wauters.

== Awards and honors ==
=== Team ===
- EuroLeague Women: 2002, 2004, 2005, 2012
- FIBA Women's World League: 2004
- Ligue Féminine de Basketball: 2001, 2002, 2003, 2004
- Russian Women's Basketball Premier League: 2005, 2006, 2010
- Liga Femenina de Baloncesto: 2012
- Women's Korean Basketball League: 2006
- Belgian Championship: 2016
- Women's National Basketball Association: 2016
- Coupe de France: 2001, 2002, 2003, 2004
- Russian Cup: 2006, 2007, 2008, 2010
- Turkish Cup: 2013

=== Individual ===
- European player of year: 2001, 2002, 2004, 2005, 2008
- EuroLeague Final Four MVP: 2001, 2002, 2004
- Best foreign player in France: 2001
- Best center of European championship in Greece: 2003
- WNBA All-Star 2005
- French Women's Basketball League's list of « 5 major » foreign players of the period 1998–2018
- EuroLeague Legacy Award: 2026
