= Jennifer Rizzotti =

American basketball player and coach (born 1974)

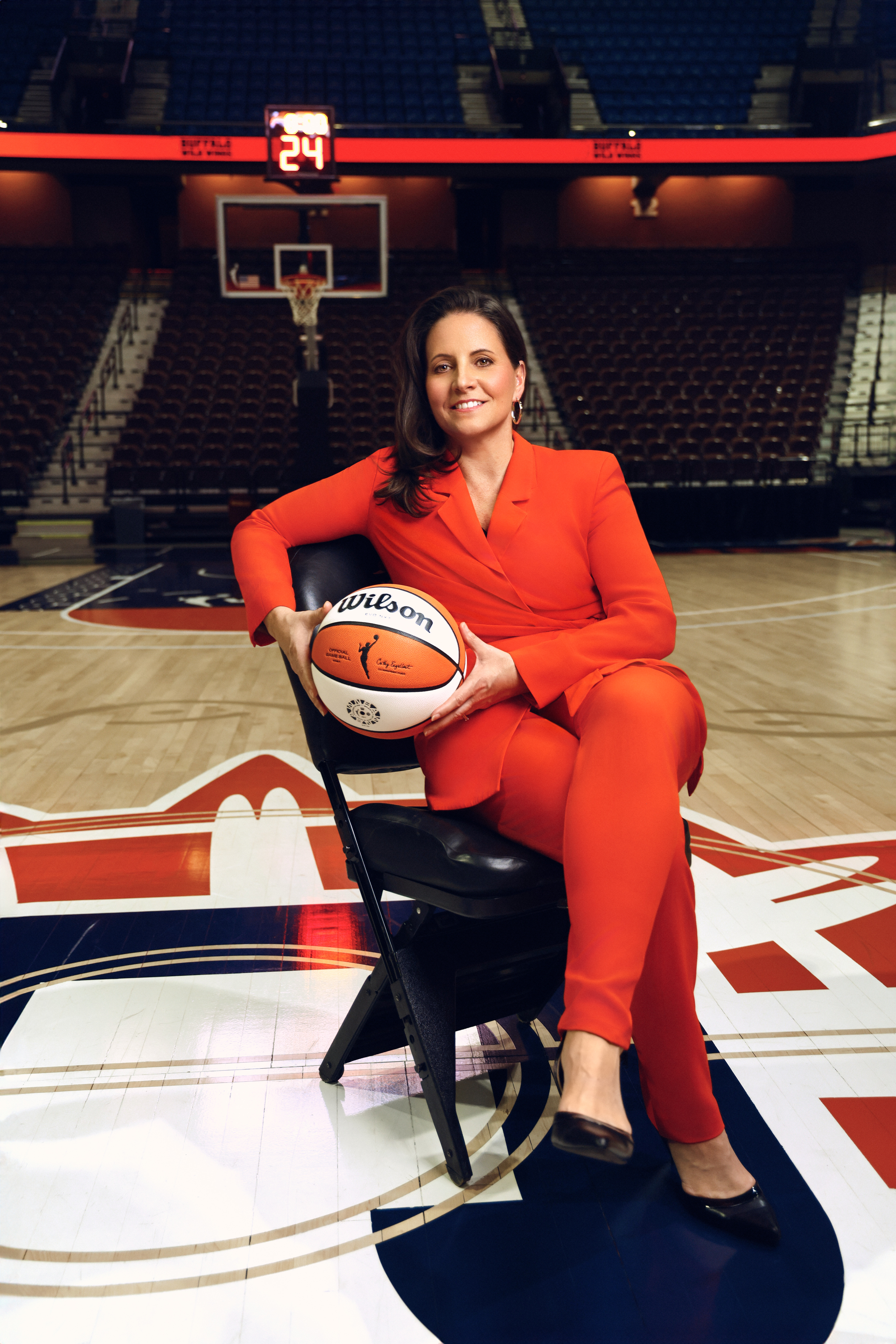
- Rizzotti in 2024

Houston Comets
- Title: President
- League: WNBA

Personal information
- Born: May 15, 1974 (age 52) White Plains, New York, U.S.
- Listed height: 5 ft 6 in (1.68 m)
- Listed weight: 146 lb (66 kg)

Career information
- High school: New Fairfield (New Fairfield, Connecticut)
- College: UConn (1992–1996)
- WNBA draft: 1999: 4th round, 48th overall pick
- Drafted by: Houston Comets
- Playing career: 1996–2003
- Position: Point guard
- Number: 21
- Coaching career: 1999–present

Career history

Playing
- 1996–1998: New England Blizzard
- 1999–2000: Houston Comets
- 2001–2003: Cleveland Rockers

Coaching
- 1999–2016: Hartford
- 2016–2021: George Washington

Career highlights
- As player: 2× WNBA champion (1999, 2000); NCAA champion (1995); Women's Basketball Academic All-American of the Year (1996); Honda-Broderick Cup (1996); Wade Trophy (1996); AP Player of the Year (1996); Honda Sports Award (1996); Frances Pomeroy Naismith Award (1996); All-American – USBWA (1996); 2× Kodak All-American (1995, 1996); First-team All-American – AP (1996); Second-team All-American – AP (1995); 2× First-team All-Big East (1995, 1996); Big East Player of the Year (1996); Big East co-Freshman of the Year (1993); Big East All-Freshman Team (1993); As coach: 5× America East tournament champion (2002, 2005, 2006, 2008, 2011); 4× America East regular season champion (2006–2008, 2010); A-10 Tournament champion (2018); 2× America East Coach of the Year (2006, 2007)
- Stats at Basketball Reference
- Women's Basketball Hall of Fame
Medals
Women's basketball
Jones Cup
| Gold medal – first place | 1996 Taipei | Team Competition |
Head Coach for United States
FIBA Under-19 World Championship
| Gold medal – first place | 2011 Puerto Montt | Team competition |
Head Coach for United States
FIBA Americas Under-18 Championship
| Gold medal – first place | 2010 Colorado Springs | Team competition |
Assistant Coach for United States
women's national basketball team
Olympic Games
| Gold medal – first place | 2020 Tokyo | Team |
| Gold medal – first place | 2016 Rio de Janeiro | Team |
FIBA Americas Under-18 Championship
| Gold medal – first place | 2006 Colorado Springs | Team competition |

Jennifer Marie Rizzotti (born May 15, 1974) is an American former collegiate and professional basketball player, and former Division I coach at George Washington University. She was the president of the Connecticut Sun now the president of the Houston Comets. Rizzotti was inducted into the Women's Basketball Hall of Fame in 2013.

== Early life ==
Rizzotti attended New Fairfield High School in New Fairfield, Connecticut. The basketball court at the New Fairfield town park was named after Rizzotti in honor of her achievements. She also attended ASIJ in Tokyo, Japan.

== College career ==
From 1992 to 1996, she was one of the stars of the women's basketball team at the University of Connecticut. She was the starting point guard on the Huskies first national championship team in 1995, which recorded a perfect season, winning all 35 games. Rizzotti's picture was on the cover of Sports Illustrated magazine in recognition of the perfect season. Jen received the Honda-Broderick Cup for 1995–96, presented to the athlete "most deserving of recognition as the Collegiate Woman Athlete of the Year." She was named the 1996 Associated Press Player of the Year. Rizzotti was a member of the inaugural class of inductees to the University of Connecticut women's basketball "Huskies of Honor" recognition program. Rizzotti won the Frances Pomeroy Naismith Award during the 1995–96 basketball season. This award is given to the best women's basketball player in the country under 5'6' tall. During the 1995–96 season Jennifer set school records for assists with 212 and steals with 112. Jennifer graduated with a degree in biology.

== USA Basketball – player ==
Rizzotti was invited to be a member of the Jones Cup team representing the US in 1996. She helped the team to a 9–0 record, and the gold medal in the event. Rizzotti averaged 2.6 points per games, while recording 26 assists, highest on the team.

== Awards and honors ==
- 1993—Big East Co-Rookie of the Year
- 1996—Wade Trophy
- 1996—Associated Press Women's College Basketball Player of the Year
- 1996—Winner of the Honda Sports Award for basketball
- 1996—The Honda-Broderick Cup winner for all sports.
- 2013—Inducted into the Women's Basketball Hall of Fame

== Professional career ==
She began her career as a professional basketball player playing for the New England Blizzard of the now defunct American Basketball League. During that time she was a two-time All-Star, Rizzotti was a member of the Houston Comets after being drafted in 1999, and played for the Comets in 1999 and 2000. The Comets won the League Championship both seasons. In 2001, she was traded to the Detroit Shock, but a month later, she was traded to the Cleveland Rockers. She played for the Cleveland Rockers from 2001 to 2003. Rizzotti was selected in the dispersal draft by the Detroit Shock in January 2004, but she retired from the WNBA prior to the 2004 season.

== Coaching career ==
Rizzotti was recently the head basketball coach at George Washington University in Washington, D.C. She previously spent 17 seasons as the head women's basketball coach at the University of Hartford where she led the Hawks to four America East Conference championships and six trips to the NCAA tournament. She was named America East Coach of the Year in 2006, 2007, and 2010. In 2010 Rizzotti guided Hartford to an undefeated regular season in the America East Conference and was one of the 10 finalists up for the Kay Yow Coach of the Year.

Rizzotti served as the head coach of the USA Basketball U18 team, at the 2010 FIBA Americas U18 Championship for Women in June 2010 at the U.S. Olympic Training Center in Colorado Springs CO. She previously served as an assistant coach of the U18 team, assisting head coach Doug Bruno in 2006, when the team went 4–0 to win the gold medal.

In 2011, Rizzotti was named USA Basketball National Coach of the Year. She was the head coach for the USA U18 team, which won the gold medal at the 2010 FIBA Americas U18 Championship. She continued as head coach of the U19 team and guided the team to another gold medal at the FIBA U19 World Championship games held in Chile.

== Hall of Fame ==
Rizzotti was inducted in the Women's Basketball Hall of Fame in June 2013. In her emotional acceptance speech she summarized, "I'm in the Hall of Fame because I played at the right school, at the right time with the right teammates, and I was taught to be a champion by the best coach who's ever coached the game." Her credentials included point guard on the 1995 National Championship team, and winner of the Wade Trophy and AP national player of the year award.

== Personal life ==
Rizzotti grew up in New Fairfield, Connecticut and graduated from New Fairfield High School in 1992. She is the daughter of Tom and Carol Rizzotti.

Rizzotti was inducted into the Connecticut Women's Basketball Hall Of Fame in 2001.

Rizzotti married University of Hartford assistant Bill Sullivan in July 1999. The two welcomed their first child, Holden Thomas Sullivan, born 16 April 2005 (age 21). The couple's second child, Conor, was born on 8 July 2008 (age 18).

Rizzotti was honored by her alma mater, the University of Connecticut, as the winner of the Red O'Neill Award, an award given annually to a former student athlete who has "gone on to distinguish themselves in their chosen career."

Rizzotti was honored by The University of Hartford in 2010 as commencement speaker. Additionally she received an honorary doctorate degree from the university.

== Career statistics ==
Legend
| GP | Games played | GS | Games started | MPG | Minutes per game | RPG | Rebounds per game |
| APG | Assists per game | SPG | Steals per game | BPG | Blocks per game | PPG | Points per game |
| TO | Turnovers per game | FG% | Field-goal percentage | 3P% | 3-point field-goal percentage | FT% | Free-throw percentage |
| **Bold** | Career best | ° | League leader |

=== WNBA ===
==== Regular season ====
| Year | Team | GP | GS | MPG | FG% | 3P% | FT% | RPG | APG | SPG | BPG | TO | PPG |
|---|---|---|---|---|---|---|---|---|---|---|---|---|---|
| 1999 | Houston | 25 | 0 | 9.7 | 35.0 | 26.9 | 58.3 | 1.1 | 0.8 | 0.7 | 0.0 | **0.6** | 1.7 |
| 2000 | Houston | 32 | 2 | 13.7 | 38.2 | 30.8 | 66.7 | 1.1 | 1.4 | 0.5 | **0.1** | 0.8 | 1.9 |
| 2001 | Cleveland | 32 | 0 | 14.9 | 38.2 | **38.4** | 63.6 | 0.9 | 1.6 | 0.8 | **0.1** | 1.3 | 3.7 |
| 2002 | Cleveland | 26 | **25** | **26.7** | **40.0** | **38.4** | **80.0** | **2.7** | **3.3** | **0.9** | **0.1** | 1.7 | **6.8** |
| 2003 | Cleveland | **33** | 0 | 15.9 | 27.8 | 19.6 | 56.3 | 1.3 | 2.0 | 0.4 | 0.0 | 1.1 | 1.8 |
| Career | 5 years, 2 teams | 148 | 27 | 16.0 | 36.7 | 33.0 | 69.3 | 1.4 | 1.8 | 0.6 | 0.1 | 1.1 | 3.1 |

==== Playoffs ====
| Year | Team | GP | GS | MPG | FG% | 3P% | FT% | RPG | APG | SPG | BPG | TO | PPG |
|---|---|---|---|---|---|---|---|---|---|---|---|---|---|
| 1999 | Houston | 2 | 0 | 2.5 | 0.0 | 0.0 | 0.0 | 0.5 | 0.5 | 0.0 | 0.0 | **0.0** | 0.0 |
| 2000 | Houston | 1 | 0 | 3.0 | 0.0 | 0.0 | 0.0 | 0.0 | 0.0 | 0.0 | 0.0 | **0.0** | 0.0 |
| 2001 | Cleveland | **3** | 0 | **15.0** | 33.3 | 33.3 | 0.0 | **1.0** | 2.3 | 0.0 | 0.0 | **0.0** | 2.0 |
| 2003 | Cleveland | **3** | 0 | 12.0 | **66.7** | 66.7 | 0.0 | 0.7 | **2.7** | 0.0 | 0.0 | 0.3 | **4.0** |
| Career | 4 years, 2 teams | 9 | 0 | 9.9 | 42.9 | 42.9 | 0.0 | 0.7 | 1.8 | 0.0 | 0.0 | 0.1 | 2.0 |

=== College ===
Jennifer Rizzotti Statistics at University of Connecticut
| Year | G | FG | FGA | PCT | 3FG | 3FGA | PCT | FT | FTA | PCT | REB | AVG | A | TO | B | S | MIN | PTS | AVG |
| 1992–93 | 29 | 116 | 288 | 0.403 | 53 | 142 | 0.373 | 73 | 118 | 0.619 | 125 | 4.3 | 104 | 116 | 1 | 60 | 1006 | 358 | 12.3 |
| 1993–94 | 33 | 110 | 239 | 0.46 | 54 | 126 | 0.429 | 52 | 78 | 0.667 | 111 | 3.4 | 150 | 90 | 4 | 80 | 992 | 326 | 9.9 |
| 1994–95 | 35 | 156 | 308 | 0.506 | 57 | 138 | 0.413 | 69 | 94 | 0.734 | 97 | 2.8 | 161 | 86 | 2 | 98 | 905 | 438 | 12.5 |
| 1995–96 | 38 | 148 | 335 | 0.442 | 43 | 158 | 0.272 | 79 | 112 | 0.705 | 126 | 3.3 | 222 | 115 | 2 | 112 | 1230 | 418 | 11.0 |
| Totals | 135 | 530 | 1170 | 0.453 | 207 | 564 | 0.367 | 273 | 402 | 0.679 | 459 | 3.4 | 637 | 407 | 9 | 350 | 4133 | 1540 | 11.1 |

== Head coaching record ==
Record table
| Season | Team | Overall | Conference | Standing | Postseason |
|---|---|---|---|---|---|
Hartford Hawks (America East Conference) (1999–2016)
| 1999–2000 | Hartford | 14–14 | 9–9 | 5th | |
| 2000–01 | Hartford | 15–14 | 9–9 | T–4th | |
| 2001–02 | Hartford | 16–15 | 9–7 | T–4th | NCAA First Round |
| 2002–03 | Hartford | 7–21 | 5–11 | 8th | |
| 2003–04 | Hartford | 18–12 | 9–9 | T–4th | |
| 2004–05 | Hartford | 22–9 | 13–5 | 2nd | NCAA First Round |
| 2005–06 | Hartford | 27–4 | 15–1 | 1st | NCAA Second Round |
| 2006–07 | Hartford | 25–9 | 15–1 | 1st | WNIT Second Round |
| 2007–08 | Hartford | 28–6 | 14–2 | 1st | NCAA Second Round |
| 2008–09 | Hartford | 20–12 | 14–2 | 2nd | WNIT Second Round |
| 2009–10 | Hartford | 27–5 | 16–0 | 1st | NCAA First Round |
| 2010–11 | Hartford | 17–16 | 11–5 | T–3rd | NCAA First Round |
| 2011–12 | Hartford | 19–13 | 10–6 | 3rd | WNIT First Round |
| 2012–13 | Hartford | 21–12 | 10–6 | 3rd | WNIT First Round |
| 2013–14 | Hartford | 13–18 | 9–7 | 5th | |
| 2014–15 | Hartford | 16–17 | 8–8 | 5th | |
| 2015–16 | Hartford | 11–19 | 7–9 | 6th | |
| Hartford: | | 316–216 (.594) | 183–97 (.654) | | |
George Washington Colonials (Atlantic 10 Conference) (2016–2021)
| 2016–17 | George Washington | 20–10 | 13–3 | T-1st | WNIT First Round |
| 2017–18 | George Washington | 19–13 | 10–6 | T-5th | NCAA First Round |
| 2018–19 | George Washington | 10–20 | 7–9 | T-8th | |
| George Washington: | | 49–43 (.533) | 30–18 (.625) | | |
| Total: | | 365–259 (.585) | | | |
National champion Postseason invitational champion Conference regular season champion Conference regular season and conference tournament champion Division regular season champion Division regular season and conference tournament champion Conference tournament champion

== See also ==
- List of Connecticut women's basketball players with 1000 points
