= 2004 WNBA dispersal draft =

General information
- Sport: Basketball
- Date: January 6, 2004

Overview
- League: WNBA
- Merging teams: Cleveland Rockers (folded in 2003)
- First selection: Penny Taylor; Phoenix Mercury

The Women's National Basketball Association (WNBA) held a second dispersal draft on January 6, 2004.

This dispersal draft re-assigned players from the Cleveland Rockers who folded after the end of 2003 WNBA season. The remaining thirteen teams in the WNBA each selected one player from the 2003 Rockers roster in the one-round draft. Teams drafted in inverse order of their 2003 regular season finish.

== Key ==
Pos.	G	F	C
Position	Guard	Forward	Center

^	Denotes player who has been inducted to the Women's Basketball Hall of Fame
*	Denotes player who has been selected for at least one All-Star Game and All-WNBA Team
^{+}	Denotes player who has been selected for at least one All-Star Game
^{#}	Denotes player who never played in the WNBA regular season or playoffs

== Draft ==
The following players were drafted from the Cleveland Rockers:

Pick	Player	Position	Nationality	New team
1	Penny Taylor * ^	F	Australia	Phoenix Mercury
2	Chasity Melvin ^{+}	C/F	United States	Washington Mystics
3	LaToya Thomas	F	United States	San Antonio Silver Stars
4	Ann Wauters ^{+}	C	Belgium	New York Liberty
5	Deanna Jackson	F	United States	Indiana Fever
6	Betty Lennox *	G	United States	Seattle Storm
7	Helen Darling	G	United States	Minnesota Lynx
8	Pollyanna Johns Kimbrough	C	United States	Houston Comets (from Connecticut)
9	Mery Andrade	F	United States	Charlotte Sting
10	Jennifer Butler ^{#}	C	United States	Sacramento Monarchs
11	Lucienne Berthieu	F/C	France	Houston Comets
12	Isabelle Fijalkowski	C	France	Los Angeles Sparks
13	Jennifer Rizzotti ^	G	United States	Detroit Shock
