= Tatiana Foroud =

Genetic researcher

- Education: Fairfield University (1987), University of California, Los Angeles (1989), Indiana University School of Medicine (1994)
- Occupation: Geneticist
- Employer: Indiana University School of Medicine

Tatiana Foroud is a genetic researcher and currently the Joe C. Christian Professor Medical and Molecular Genetics, August M. Watanabe Professor for Medical Research, Distinguished Professor and Chancellor's Professor at the Indiana University School of Medicine.

== Early life and education ==
Foroud was raised in Fairfield, Connecticut and graduated from Fairfield Warde High School in 1983.

Foroud received her bachelor's degree in biology and mathematics from Fairfield University in 1987, master's degree in biomathematics from the University of California, Los Angeles in 1989, and doctoral degree in population genetics from the Indiana University School of Medicine in 1994.

== Research and career ==
Foroud joined the Indiana University School of Medicine faculty in 1994 and was named the P. Michael Conneally Professor of Medical and Molecular Genetics in 2005. Indiana University appointed Foroud to the rank of Distinguished Professor, the highest academic rank at the university in 2017.

Foroud is director of Hereditary Genomics Division of the Department of Medical and Molecular Genetics, and leads the Genetics, Biomarker and Bioinformatics department at the Indiana Alzheimer Disease Center. She is scientific director of the Indiana Biobank.

Foroud's research is primarily in the area of mapping genes contributing to the susceptibility for common, complex genetic disorders. These include disorders such as Parkinson's disease, Alzheimer's disease, bipolar disorder and alcoholism.
