= FIBA Women's World League =

FIBA Women's World League was an annual women's basketball competition organised by FIBA from 2003 to 2007.

== 2006–07 ==
Winners: CSKA Moscow, Russia

Preliminary Round:

Group A (Shaoxing, China)

China	WCBA All-Stars
Australia	Canberra Capitals
Lithuania	TEO Vilnius
Russia	Baltiskaya Zwezda

Group B (Pécs, Hungary)

Mali	Djoliba AC
Cuba	Basketball Club Habana
Hungary	MiZo Pécs
Chinese Taipei	Team Chinese Taipei

Final Tournament (Yekaterinburg, Russia)

Lithuania	TEO Vilnius
Cuba	Basketball Club Habana
China	WCBA Select
Australia	Canberra Capitals
Hungary	MiZo Pecs
Russia	UMMC Yekaterinburg
Russia	CSKA Moscow
United States	USA All Stars

CSKA Moscow beat Team USA in the final game 75–65.

== 2005 ==
The event was again held in Samara, Russia.

Participants:

Brazil	ADCF UNIMED de Ourinhos
Cuba	Basketball Club Habana
China	WCBA Select
Australia	Dandenong Rangers
Czech Republic	Gambrinus Brno
Russia	UMMC Yekaterinburg
Russia	VBM-SGAU
South Korea	WKBL Select

VBM-SGAU successfully accomplished a three-peat.

== 2004 ==
Preliminary Round:

Group A (Taipei, Taiwan)

Chinese Taipei	Cathay Life Insurance
Australia	Dandenong Rangers
South Korea	WKBL Select
Russia	Baltiskaya Zwezda

Group B (São Paulo, Brazil)

Brazil	ADCF-Unimed
Cuba	Basketball Club Habana
France	US Valenciennes Olympic
Nigeria	First Bank

Final Tournament (Saint Petersburg, Russia)

Chinese Taipei	Cathay Life Insurance
Australia	Dandenong Rangers
South Korea	WKBL Select
Russia	Baltiskaya Zwezda
Brazil	ADCF-Unimed
Cuba	Basketball Club Habana
Russia	VBM-SGAU
Poland	Lotus VBW Clima

VBM-SGAU beat Lotus VBW 83–67 in the final to retain the World Title.

== 2003 ==
The event was held in Samara, Russia.

Participants:

Russia	VBM-SGAU
South Korea	Seoul Woori Bank
USA	WNBA Select
Brazil	Sao Paulo
Australia	Canberra Capitals
Mozambique	Mambas de Mozambique
Russia	UMMC Ekaterinburg
France	US Valenciennes Olympic

Behind Maria Stepanova's 17 points and 16 rebounds, host VBM-SGAU edged WNBA Select 72–68 in the final.
