= 2012 Women's National Invitation Tournament =

College basketball postseason tournament

- Teams: 64
- Finals site: Gallagher-Iba Arena, Stillwater, Oklahoma
- Champions: Oklahoma State (1st title)
- Runner-up: James Madison (1st title game)
- Winning coach: Jim Littell (1st title)
- MVP: Toni Young (Oklahoma State)
- Attendance: 6,157 (championship game)

The 2012 Women's National Invitation Tournament (WNIT) was a single-elimination tournament of 64 National Collegiate Athletic Association (NCAA) Division I teams that did not participate in the 2012 NCAA Division I women's basketball tournament. The tournament were played entirely on campus sites. The highest ranked team in each conference that did not receive a bid to the NCAA Tournament received an automatic bid to this tournament. The remaining slots were filled by the WNIT Selection Committee. The Oklahoma State Cowgirls won their first WNIT title, defeating the James Madison Dukes in the championship game, 75–68. Toni Young of Oklahoma State was named tournament MVP.

== Preseason WNIT ==
The pre-season 2011 is the 18th edition of the Women's National Invitation Tournament (WNIT), an annual event hosted entirely at campus sites. The championship game had the No. 1-ranked Baylor hosting the No. 2-ranked Notre Dame. The WNIT MVP Brittney Griner scored 32 points for Baylor in a win over Notre Dame.

=== Championship Bracket ===
First Round; November 11, 2011
Baylor	82
Howard	28
Chattanooga	65
UAB	59
UCLA	67
McNeese State	59
East Tennessee State	76
Tennessee Tech	87
Notre Dame	81
Akron	61
Indiana State	64
Detroit	62
Hartford	64
Manhattan	45
Drexel	52
Long Island	60

Quarterfinals; November 13, 2011
Baylor	91
Chattanooga	31
UCLA	74
Tennessee Tech	52
Notre Dame	99
Indiana State	34
Hartford	54
Long Island	45

Semifinals; November 14, 2011
Baylor	83
UCLA	50
Notre Dame	98
Hartford	43

Championship; November 15, 2011
Baylor	94
Notre Dame	81

=== Consolation Brackets ===
==== Consolation Rounds 1 & 2 ====
- Games Played at Akron

Round 1 November 18, 2011		Round 2 November 19, 2011
Detroit	56
Drexel	61	Drexel	67
Akron	64	Akron	60
Howard	63

Round 2 November 19, 2011
Detroit	58
Howard	60

==== Consolation Rounds 1 & 2 ====
- Games Played at McNeese State

Round 1 November 18, 2011		Round 2 November 19, 2011
UAB	59
East Tennessee State	47	UAB	56
McNeese State	69	McNeese State	61^{OT}
Manhattan	52

Round 2 November 19, 2011
East Tennessee State	53
Manhattan	86

==== Consolation Round 3 ====
- Quarterfinal Losers

Round 3 November 18, 2011
Tennessee Tech	53
Long Island	62

Round 3 November 18, 2011
Indiana State*	54
Chattanooga	75

Team listed on top is home team

== Post-Season Tournament ==
The post-season 2012 Women's National Invitation Tournament (WNIT) is a single-elimination tournament of 64 National Collegiate Athletic Association (NCAA) Division I teams that did not participate in the 2012 NCAA Division I women's basketball tournament. The tournament is played entirely on campus sites. The highest ranked team in each conference that did not receive a bid to the NCAA Tournament received an automatic bid to this tournament. The remaining slots were filled by the WNIT Selection Committee.

The Oklahoma State Cowgirls won their first WNIT title by the score of 75–68 over the James Madison Dukes. Oklahoma State was coached by Jim Littell, who took over following the death of head coach Kurt Budke in a plane crash on November 17, 2011.

== Participants ==
=== Automatic bids ===
Legend	School	Conference
1	Boston University	America East
2	Temple	Atlantic 10
3		ACC
4	Stetson	Atlantic Sun
5	Texas Tech	Big 12
6	South Florida	Big East
7	Northern Colorado	Big Sky
8	High Point	Big South
9		Big Ten
10	Cal Poly	Big West
11	James Madison	CAA
12	Memphis	C-USA
13	Detroit	Horizon
14	Harvard	Ivy League
15	Howard	MEAC
16	Fairfield	MAAC
17		MAC
18	Missouri State	MVC
19	UNLV	Mountain West
20	Quinnipiac	Northeast
21	Eastern Illinois	Ohio Valley
22		Pac-12
23	American	Patriot
24		SEC
25	Davidson	Southern
26	Central Arkansas	Southland
27	Oral Roberts	The Summit
28	Florida Atlantic	Sun Belt
29	Mississippi Valley State	SWAC
30	Utah State	WAC
31	San Diego	WCC

In addition to the 31 automatic bids from respective conferences, 33 teams, with a winning record, will receive an at-large bid to the tournament.

=== At-Large bids ===
Legend	School	Conference
1	Appalachian State	Southern
2	Arizona State	Pac-12
3	Bowling Green	MAC
4	Cal State Northridge	Big West
5	Central Michigan	MAC
6	Charlotte	Atlantic 10
7	Chattanooga	Southern
8	Cincinnati	Big East
9	Colorado	Pac-12
10	Drake	MVC
11	Drexel	CAA
12	Duquesne	Atlantic 10
13	Florida International	Sun Belt
14	Hartford	America East
15	Hofstra	Colonial
16	Illinois State	Missouri Valley
17	Miami (OH)	MAC
18	North Carolina State	ACC
19	Oklahoma State	Big 12
20	Oregon State	Pac-12
21	Pacific	Big West
22	Richmond	Atlantic 10
23	St Joseph's	Atlantic 10
24	St. Mary's	WCC
25	South Dakota	The Summit
26	Syracuse	Big East
27	Texas Tech	Big 12
28	Toledo	MAC
29	Tulane	C-USA
30	UC Davis	Big West
31	UMKC	The Summit
32	UNC Wilmington	CAA
33	Utah	Pac-12
34	Villanova	Big East
35	Virginia	ACC
36	VCU	CAA
37	Wake Forest	ACC
38	Washington	Pac-12
39	Wichita State	MVC

== Bracket ==
Team listed on top is home team

=== Region 1 ===
First round March 14–16
Oregon State	66
UC Davis	48
Saint Mary's	71
UNLV	63
Washington	90
Cal Poly	71
Utah	69
Utah State	58
Texas Tech	85
Eastern Illinois	71
Tulane	68
Mississippi Valley State	61
San Diego	60
Cal State Northridge	58
Pacific	77
Arizona State	62

Second round March 17–19
Oregon State	56
Saint Mary's	41
Washington	52
Utah	39
Texas Tech	69
Tulane	55
San Diego	83
Pacific	75

Third round March 21–23
Oregon State	49
Washington	55
Texas Tech	51
San Diego	60

Quarterfinals; March 24–26
Washington	47
San Diego	58

=== Region 2 ===
First round March 14–16
Illinois State	69
Central Michigan	68
Villanova	58
American	39
South Dakota	61
Drake	53
Colorado	54
Northern Colorado	42
Wichita State	79
Oral Roberts	57
Oklahoma State	72
Central Arkansas	51
Missouri State	81
UMKC	79
Memphis	60
Chattanooga	59

Second round March 17–19
Illinois State	55
Villanova	58
South Dakota	55
Colorado	64
Wichita State	44
Oklahoma State	63
Missouri State	82
Memphis	65

Third round March 21–23
Villanova	47
Colorado	48
Oklahoma State	70
Missouri State	57

Quarterfinals; March 24–26
Colorado	70
Oklahoma State	78

=== Region 3 ===
First round March 14–16
Temple	75
Quinnipiac	60
Hofstra	71
Harvard	73
Hartford	42
Syracuse	59
Fairfield	41
Drexel	57
Toledo	59
Detroit	49
Cincinnati	68^{OT}
Duquesne	63
Saint Joseph's	67
Boston University	56
Bowling Green	71
VCU	72

Second round March 17–19
Temple	64
Harvard	59
Syracuse	65
Drexel	43
Toledo	74
Cincinnati	51
Saint Joseph's	65
VCU	67^{OT}

Third round March 21–23
Temple	68
Syracuse	82
Toledo	81
VCU	64

Quarterfinals; March 24–26
Syracuse	74^{OT}
Toledo	73

=== Region 4 ===
First round March 14–16
NC State	88
High Point	78
UNC Wilmington	73
Appalachian State	79
Virginia	59 ^{OT}
Howard	56
Richmond	76
Miami (Ohio)	54
James Madison	64
Davidson	49
Charlotte	61
Wake Forest	72
South Florida	76
FAU	20
FIU	75
Stetson	47

Second round March 17–19
NC State	62
Appalachian State	66
Virginia	68
Richmond	55
James Madison	84 ^{OT}
Wake Forest	76
South Florida	77
FIU	61

Third round March 21–23
Appalachian State	58
Virginia	74
James Madison	72
South Florida	45

Quarterfinals; March 24–26
Virginia	59
James Madison	68

=== Semifinals and championship game ===
Played at host schools

Semifinals; March 28; CBSSN
San Diego	57
Oklahoma State	73
Syracuse	71
James Madison	74

Championship Game; March 31; CBSSN
Oklahoma State	75
James Madison	68

== All-tournament team ==
- Toni Young, Oklahoma State (MVP)
- Liz Donohoe, Oklahoma State
- Kirby Burkholder, James Madison
- Tarik Hislop, James Madison
- Kayla Alexander, Syracuse
- Dominique Conners, San Diego

== See also ==
- 2012 National Invitation Tournament
