= York Catholic High School =

Location
- 601 East Springettsbury Avenue; York, Pennsylvania 17403; United States
- Coordinates: 39°57′20″N 76°42′40″W

Information
- Funding type: Private
- Motto: Maria Impende Juvamen (O Mary, bestow your aid)
- Religious affiliation: Roman Catholic
- Established: 1928; 98 years ago
- Oversight: Roman Catholic Diocese of Harrisburg
- Principal: Kathy Hand
- Chaplain: Father St. Dennis
- Grades: 7–12
- Gender: Co-educational
- Enrollment: 614 (2019)
- Student to teacher ratio: 15:1
- Colors: Green and gold
- Nickname: Fighting Irish
- Rival: Delone Catholic High School
- Accreditation: Middle States Association of Colleges and Schools
- Newspaper: Irish Eye
- Yearbook: Rosa Mystica
- Website: www.yorkcatholic.org

York Catholic High School is a Catholic high school in York, Pennsylvania, U.S., operated by the Roman Catholic Diocese of Harrisburg for boys and girls in the 7th through 12th grades.

It has occupied several buildings, including one on West King Street in York from 1940 to 1959. It has an Athletic Hall of Fame.

The school colors are green and gold. Its trams compete as the Fighting Irish. As of 2025, their football team has won five district championships.

In 2025 it partnered with York College of Pennsylvania to offer classes for college credits.

President: Katie Doyle

Principal: Kathy Hand
