= Athens Area School District =

School district in Pennsylvania

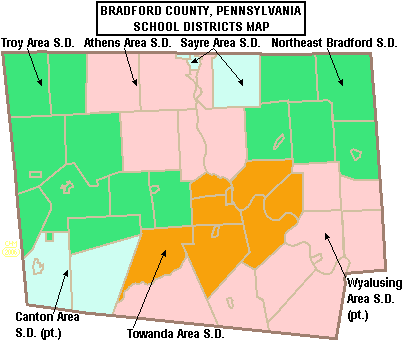

Address
- 100 Canal Street Athens, Pennsylvania, 18810; United States

District information
- Type: Public

Students and staff
- District mascot: Wildcats

Other information
- Website: www.athensasd.k12.pa.us

The Athens Area School District is a mid-sized, rural, public school district which serves the borough of Athens and Ridgebury, Athens, Smithfield, Ulster, and Sheshequin townships in Bradford County, Pennsylvania.

Athens Area School District encompasses approximately 178 square miles (460 km^{2}). As of the 2000 U.S. census, the district serves a resident population of 15,533.

== Extracurriculars ==
The district offers a variety of clubs, activities and an extensive sports program.

=== Sports ===
The district funds the following varsity sports:

Boys

- Baseball – AA
- Basketball – AAA
- Cross Country – AA
- Football – AA
- Golf – AA
- Soccer – AA
- Swimming and Diving – AA
- Track and Field – AA
- Wrestling – AA

Girls

- Basketball – AAA
- Cross Country – AA
- Golf – AA
- Soccer (Fall) – AA
- Softball – AAA
- Swimming and Diving – AA
- Track and Field – AAA
- Volleyball – AA

- According to PIAA directory July 2012

A typical cafeteria menu offering at Athens Area Schools could be: chicken nuggets with a bread slice, ham and cheese quesadilla, steamed peas, applesauce, and milk.
