= Wheeler High School (Connecticut) =

Location
- 297 Norwich-Westerly Road; North Stonington, Connecticut 06359; United States
- Coordinates: 41°26′23″N 71°53′10″W

Information
- Type: Public school
- CEEB code: 070575
- Principal: Kristen St. Germain
- Grades: 7-12
- Enrollment: 330 (2023-2024)
- Athletics conference: Eastern Connecticut Conference
- Website: www.northstonington.k12.ct.us/schools/wheeler-high-school/

Wheeler High School is a small public high school located on Norwich-Westerly Road (Route 2) in North Stonington, Connecticut. It is part of the North Stonington School District.

In terms of enrollment, it is one of the state's smallest public school, serving approximately 190 students in grades 9 through 12. The school is now all on one side of Route 2, now that a new facility was built in 2018.
