= Central Connecticut–Hartford rivalry =

American college sports rivalry

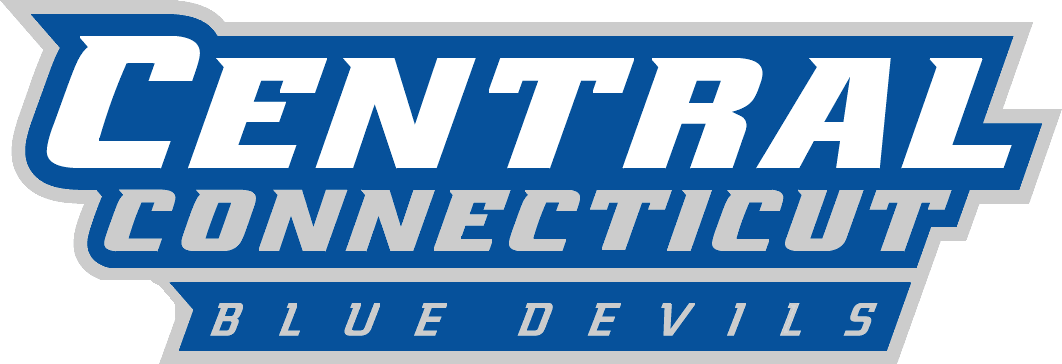
- Central Connecticut Blue Devils Hartford Hawks

Locations of the two universities in Connecticut.

The Central Connecticut–Hartford rivalry was the collegiate athletics rivalry between the Central Connecticut (CCSU) Blue Devils sports teams of Central Connecticut State University and Hartford Hawks sports teams of the University of Hartford. Unlike most in-state rivalries, Hartford and CCSU compete in different conferences. Hartford competed in the America East Conference until the school's 2023 reclassification to Division III and move to the Conference of New England and CCSU competes in the Northeast Conference.

College Comparison
	Central Connecticut	Hartford
Founded	1849	1957
Type	Public	Private
Conference	Northeast Conference	Conference of New England
Students	9,653	5,740
School colors		
Nickname	Blue Devils	Hawks

== Basketball ==
Central Connecticut–Hartford men's basketball rivalry
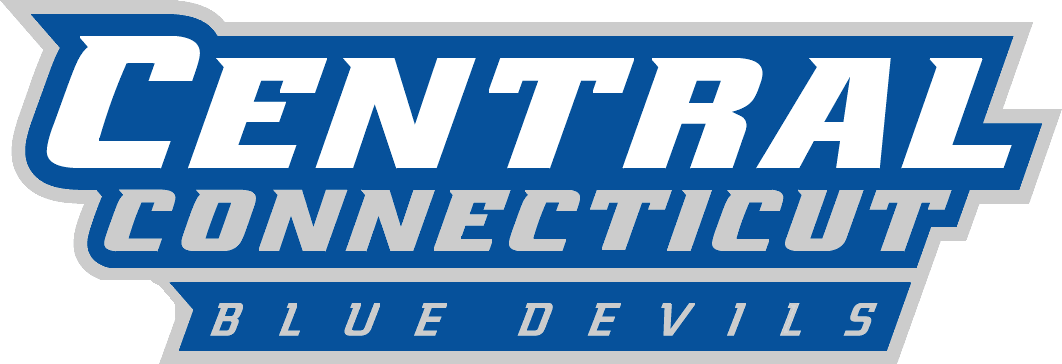
- Central Connecticut Blue Devils Hartford Hawks
- Sport: Basketball
- First meeting: December 13, 1958
- Latest meeting: February 8, 2023; Central Connecticut 82, Hartford 73

Statistics
- Current win streak: Central Connecticut 2 (2021–present)

The two schools starting playing each other as division II rivals in 1958. After the 2002 edition the series went on hiatus until 2010 when both schools competed against each other in the Connecticut 6 tournament held at Mohegan Sun Arena. During the break in the series, Central Connecticut became a power in the Northeast Conference under head coach Howie Dickenman making the NCAA tournament in 2000, 2002, and 2007.

Traditionally the game is played at the beginning of every season. In the 2017 matchup Central's head coach Donyell Marshall and assistant coach Anthony Anderson were both suspended for the game due to an altercation at practice, assistant coaches Mike Witcoskie and Anthony Ross handled the coaching duties for the Hartford game.

=== Men's basketball series record ===
Central Connecticut victories	Hartford victories

No.	Date	Location	Winner	Score
1	December 13, 1958		Central Connecticut	82–73
2	February 10, 1960		Central Connecticut	69–60
3	February 7, 1961		Central Connecticut	92–79
4	February 5, 1971		Central Connecticut	82–79
5	January 26, 1972		Central Connecticut	91–82
6	December 1, 1972		Central Connecticut	69–67
7	December 1, 1973		Central Connecticut	80–68
8	December 7, 1974		Hartford	84–67
9	December 6, 1975		Hartford	84–76
10	December 10, 1976		Hartford	79–78
11	December 10, 1977		Central Connecticut	83–81
12	December 8, 1978		Hartford	71–67
13	December 7, 1979		Central Connecticut	67–66
14	December 5, 1980		Central Connecticut	80–68
15	November 20, 1981		Central Connecticut	79–57
16	February 5, 1983		Central Connecticut	67–49
17	January 14, 1984		Hartford	77–72
18	February 27, 1991	West Hartford, CT	Hartford	68–53
19	January 22, 1992	New Britain, CT	Central Connecticut	81–80
20	January 11, 1993	West Hartford, CT	Hartford	83–53
21	January 25, 1994	New Britain, CT	Hartford	122–103

No.	Date	Location	Winner	Score
22	December 5, 1997	West Hartford, CT	Hartford	85–72
23	December 4, 1998	Hartford, CT	Hartford	89–82
24	December 3, 1999	Hartford, CT	Central Connecticut	64–61
25	November 30, 2000	West Hartford, CT	Central Connecticut	81–65
26	November 29, 2001	West Hartford, CT	Central Connecticut	73–59
27	December 11, 2002	Hartford, CT	Central Connecticut	70–66
28	November 13, 2010	Uncasville, CT	Central Connecticut	64–62
29	November 26, 2011	New Britain, CT	Central Connecticut	92–58
30	November 24, 2012	West Hartford, CT	Hartford	80–77
31	December 10, 2013	New Britain, CT	Central Connecticut	73–59
32	December 6, 2014	West Hartford, CT	Central Connecticut	56–47
33	November 13, 2015	New Britain, CT	Hartford	92–83 ^{2OT}
34	November 11, 2016	New Britain, CT	Central Connecticut	75–60
35	November 10, 2017	West Hartford, CT	Hartford	85–84 ^{OT}
36	November 6, 2018	West Hartford, CT	Central Connecticut	75–68
37	November 5, 2019	New Britain, CT	Hartford	74–59
38	December 4, 2020	West Hartford, CT	Hartford	80–65
39	December 18, 2021	New Britain, CT	Central Connecticut	75–65
40	February 8, 2023	West Hartford, CT	Central Connecticut	82–73
Series: Central Connecticut leads 25–15

== Baseball ==
Central Connecticut and Hartford first played each other in baseball in 1985. Central started to dominate the series in the early part of the millennium, with its teams making multiple trips to the NCAA tournament. In 2010 CCSU completed construction of Balf–Savin Field on campus, their first game in the new stadium was a 12–11 loss to Hartford. Starting in 2018, Central Connecticut and Hartford played against each other at Dunkin' Donuts Park in downtown Hartford in March and in May. In 2023, the two played their last baseball game against each other and Central Connecticut won 5–3.

=== Baseball series record ===
Central Connecticut victories	Hartford victories

No.	Date	Location	Winner	Score
1	April 1, 1985	West Hartford, CT	Central Connecticut	7–4
2	April 15, 1986	New Britain, CT	Hartford	15–4
3	April 30, 1986	East Hartford, CT	Central Connecticut	6–3
4	April 20, 1987	East Hartford, CT	Central Connecticut	1–0
5	April 20, 1987	East Hartford, CT	Central Connecticut	5–3
6	April 16, 1988	New Britain, CT	Hartford	3–1
7	April 16, 1988	New Britain, CT	Central Connecticut	8–1
8	April 17, 1988	New Britain, CT	Central Connecticut	3–2
9	April 22, 1989	East Hartford, CT	Hartford	9–0
10	April 22, 1989	East Hartford, CT	Central Connecticut	3–2
11	April 23, 1989	East Hartford, CT	Hartford	13–11
12	April 14, 1990	New Britain, CT	Central Connecticut	8–1
13	April 14, 1990	New Britain, CT	Central Connecticut	2–1
14	April 16, 1990	New Britain, CT	Central Connecticut	2–1
15	May 2, 1991	East Hartford, CT	Hartford	8–6
16	April 22, 1992	East Hartford, CT	Hartford	6–5
17	April 21, 1993	Simsbury, CT	Hartford	11–8
18	April 28, 1993	East Hartford, CT	Hartford	6–2
19	April 20, 1994	East Hartford, CT	Hartford	8–5
20	April 27, 1994	New Britain, CT	Hartford	12–5
21	April 19, 1995	East Hartford, CT	Central Connecticut	5–3
22	April 26, 1995	New Britain, CT	Central Connecticut	17–3
23	April 4, 1996	New Britain, CT	Central Connecticut	11–9
24	April 24, 1996	East Hartford, CT	Central Connecticut	17–9
25	April 22, 1997	East Hartford, CT	Hartford	9–7
26	April 21, 1998	New Britain, CT	Central Connecticut	11–10
27	April 14, 1999	East Hartford, CT	Hartford	3–2
28	April 21, 1999	New Britain, CT	Central Connecticut	9–6
29	April 12, 2000	New Britain, CT	Central Connecticut	6–4
30	April 17, 2001	New Britain, CT	Central Connecticut	12–10
31	May 1, 2001	East Hartford, CT	Hartford	22–11

No.	Date	Location	Winner	Score
32	March 19, 2002	New Britain, CT	Central Connecticut	15–3
33	April 17, 2002	East Hartford, CT	Central Connecticut	17–4
34	April 16, 2003	East Hartford, CT	Hartford	4–3
35	April 21, 2003	New Britain, CT	Tie	12–12
36	March 11, 2004	Simsbury, CT	Central Connecticut	22–1
37	April 12, 2004	Bristol, CT	Central Connecticut	19–6
38	March 8, 2006	West Hartford, CT	Central Connecticut	10–4
39	March 15, 2006	New Britain, CT	Central Connecticut	13–7
40	March 14, 2007	New Britain, CT	Central Connecticut	2–1
41	March 14, 2007	New Britain, CT	Central Connecticut	13–9
42	March 27, 2009	West Hartford, CT	Hartford	9–8
43	March 10, 2010	New Britain, CT	Hartford	12–11
44	May 4, 2010	West Hartford, CT	Central Connecticut	19–6
45	March 9, 2011	New Britain, CT	Tie	3–3
46	March 7, 2012	West Hartford, CT	Hartford	5–2
47	May 2, 2012	New Britain, CT	Hartford	3–2
48	May 15, 2013	West Hartford, CT	Central Connecticut	9–4
49	May 13, 2014	West Hartford, CT	Central Connecticut	5–1
50	March 11, 2015	New Britain, CT	Hartford	4–3
51	May 12, 2015	West Hartford, CT	Central Connecticut	8–5
52	March 9, 2016	New Britain, CT	Hartford	11–9
53	May 17, 2016	West Hartford, CT	Hartford	10–0
54	March 8, 2017	New Britain, CT	Central Connecticut	6–4
55	May 17, 2017	West Hartford, CT	Central Connecticut	11–10
56	March 31, 2018	Hartford, CT	Hartford	2–1
57	May 6, 2018	Hartford, CT	Hartford	3–0
58	May 7, 2019	Hartford, CT	Hartford	7–3
59	March 4, 2020	New Britain, CT	Hartford	8–5
60	May 3, 2022	West Hartford, CT	Central Connecticut	14–9
61	May 2, 2023	New Britain, CT	Central Connecticut	5–3
Series: Central Connecticut leads 34–25–2
