= Fairfield Warde High School =

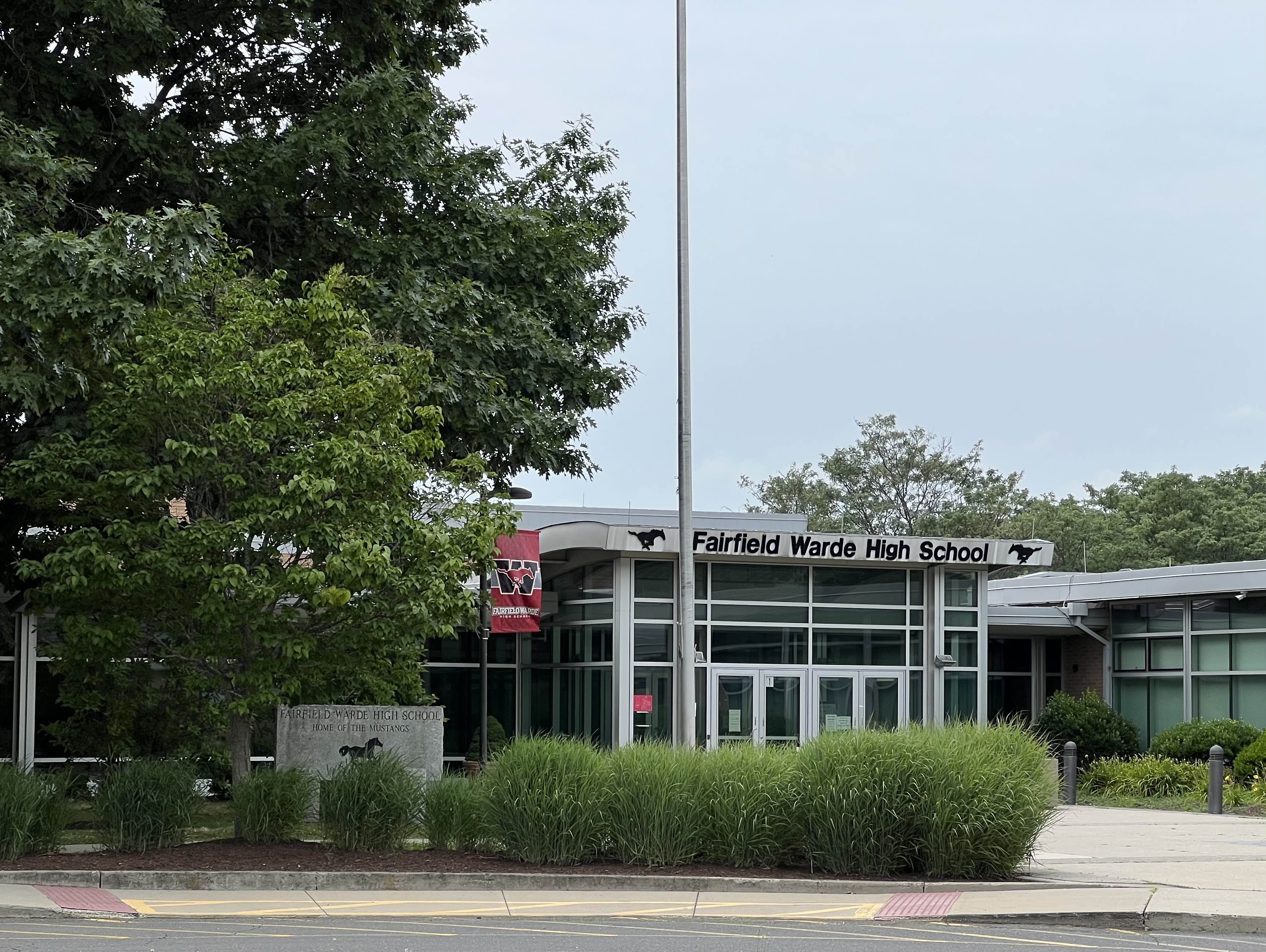
- Fairfield Warde High School's front entrance in 2024

Location
- 755 Melville Avenue; Fairfield, Fairfield County, Connecticut; United States; 41.1876°N 73.2341°W

Information
- Type: Public
- Motto: Welcoming, Academic, Respectful, Dynamic, Ethical (formerly Friendship, Honor, Scholarship)
- Established: 1956 (70 years ago)
- School district: Fairfield Public Schools
- CEEB code: 070186
- Principal: Paul Cavanna
- Faculty: 197
- Teaching staff: 123.35 (FTE)
- Grades: 9-12
- Enrollment: 1,370 (2023-2024)
- Student to teacher ratio: 11.11
- Houses: Fitts, Pequot, and Townsend
- Colors: Red, white, black
- Athletics: Football, basketball, lacrosse, soccer, field hockey, baseball, swimming, wrestling, golf, tennis, fencing, dance, cross-country, track, sailing, cheerleading, volleyball
- Mascot: Mustang
- Nickname: Warde
- Rival: Fairfield Ludlowe High School
- Yearbook: Equus (formerly Farfieldiana, formerly Flame)
- Year-round schedule: No
- Website: fwhs.fairfieldschools.org

Fairfield Warde High School is a co-educational secondary school located in Fairfield, Connecticut, United States. The Fairfield Warde Mustangs play in the FCIAC division of the CIAC. As of 2025, it is ranked 28th in the state by U.S. News & World Report, with an overall score of 91.18/100.

== Notable people ==
- Richard Belzer (1962), actor, author and stand-up comedian
- Linda Kozlowski (1976), actress
- Tatiana Foroud (1983), genetic researcher
- David Pittu (1985), actor, writer and director
- Eliot A. Jardines (1989), founder of the National Open Source Enterprise
- J. J. Henry (1993), professional golfer
- Thomas Blake (1994), professional tennis player
- John Mayer (1995), musician
- Matt Morgan (1995), professional wrestler
- James Blake (1997), professional tennis player
- Raviv "Ricky" Ullman (2004), actor
- Will Sawin (2011), algebraic geometer and number theorist, professor at Princeton University.
- Kristen Santos (2012), Olympic short track Speedskater
- Jack Baran (2014), YouTuber
- Sophie Flay (2014), broadcast journalist and anchor
- Mariam Mamadashvili (2023), child singer
