= 2001–02 Duke Blue Devils women's basketball team =

2001–02 Duke Blue Devils women's basketball season

2001–02 Duke Blue Devils women's basketball

ACC Regular season champions ACC tournament champions

NCAA tournament, Final Four
- Conference: Atlantic Coast Conference

Ranking
- Coaches: No. 4
- AP: No. 3
- Record: 31–4 (16–0 ACC)
- Head coach: Gail Goestenkors (10th season)
- Assistant coaches: Gale Valley (13th season); Joanne Boyle (9th season); Georgia Schweitzer (1st season)
- Home arena: Cameron Indoor Stadium

2001–02 ACC women's basketball standings
	Conf.				Overall
Team	W		L	PCT	W		L	PCT
No. 3 Duke †	16	–	0	1.000	31	–	4	.886
No. 16 North Carolina	11	–	5	.688	26	–	9	.743
Clemson	9	–	7	.563	17	–	12	.586
Virginia	9	–	7	.563	17	–	13	.567
Georgia Tech	7	–	9	.438	15	–	14	.517
NC State	7	–	9	.438	14	–	15	.483
Wake Forest	5	–	11	.313	12	–	16	.429
Florida State	4	–	12	.250	13	–	15	.464
Maryland	4	–	12	.250	13	–	17	.433
† 2002 ACC tournament winner Rankings from AP poll

The 2001–02 Duke Blue Devils women's basketball team represented Duke University during the 2001–02 NCAA Division I women's basketball season. The team was led by head coach Gail Goestenkors in her 10th season at the school, and played its home games at Cameron Indoor Stadium in Durham, North Carolina as members of the Atlantic Coast Conference. They finished the season 31–4, 16–0 in ACC play to win the regular season conference title by five games. They followed that success by winning the ACC tournament to receive the conference's automatic bid to the NCAA tournament. Playing as No. 1 seed in the East region, the Blue Devils defeated Norfolk State, TCU, Texas, and South Carolina to reach the Final Four. In the National semifinal round, the Blue Devils were defeated by the No. 1 seed from the West region, Oklahoma, 86–71.

== Season summary ==
=== Regular season ===
The Blue Devils started the season with 10 players and a very young team with only one senior, two juniors, five sophomores and two freshmen. Duke opened with a bang, knocking off seventh ranked Texas Tech in the State Farm Tip-Off Classic, but then went through some growing pains. On the road for the first time, the No. 5 Blue Devils were stunned by unranked MAC opponent Toledo, 67–71. The ladies returned home for the annual Duke Women's Basketball Classic, where they opened with a blowout victory over Davidson, but then stumbled against another unranked opponent in South Carolina, falling in overtime in the title game, 81–87. The loss broke the Blue Devils 9-year title streak in the Duke Women's Basketball Classic, and also wound up being the only loss at home all season. To make matters worse, on November 28th, 9th-year assistant coach Joanne Boyle was stricken with an arteriovenous malformation, an affliction that kept her in the hospital for 2 weeks.

Following a victory over No. 6 Louisiana Tech, the Blue Devils were dealt another setback when sophomores Rometra Craig and Crystal White decided to transfer right before the team left for its first ACC contest of the year at Virginia. Down two players and an assistant coach, the Blue Devils faced an uphill battle with only eight players. The Blue Devils responded by defeating Virginia in a 34-point drubbing, 107–73, then proceeded to make light work of Georgetown, UNC Greensboro, and Liberty, winning every game by 30-plus points. Coach Goestenkors became the all time winningest coach in school history following the win over UNC Greensboro, her 214th victory as the head women's basketball coach for Duke. Heading into Christmas break, the ladies carried a six-game winning streak. Following Christmas break, Duke's streak came to a screeching halt, as No. 2 Tennessee hobbled the Blue Devils in the ACC/SEC Shootout, 68–89. With the defeat, Duke entered conference play proper with a 9–3 (1–0, ACC) record.

Duke dominated ACC play, winning its first four ACC contests by an average margin of 25.0 points. A standout performance occurred when Alana Beard posted a then-career high against Maryland on January 2, scoring 35-points. The sophomore shot 15 of 22 from the field, grabbed 11 rebounds, and was 2 assists away from a triple-double. As a result, Beard was named ACC Player of the Week for the week of January 7th, an honor she would go on to receive a record-tying 5-times throughout the season. Additionally, Coach Boyle made her return to the bench on January 6 during the game against Wake Forest. The Blue Devils dominated in her return with a 45–point win, 91–46. The ladies continued their dominant play into February as the Blue Devils finished undefeated in conference play, just the fifth time in ACC history a team had finished undefeated in conference play.

=== ACC tournament ===
The Blue Devils then headed to Greensboro, North Carolina for the ACC Tournament in their home away from home— the Greensboro Coliseum. Duke had recorded an 8–0 record in previous games played there and went on to improve the unbelievable mark to 11–0 after downing Florida State, Virginia and North Carolina to win the ACC Tournament title. In the championship game against Carolina, freshman sensation Monique Currie registered career highs in points (30), rebounds (12), en route to an 87–80 championship victory. With the win, Duke completed a season sweep over their in-state rivals, and secured their 3rd consecutive ACC tournament title. Currie was named tournament MVP.

=== NCAA tournament ===
As conference tournament champions, Duke received an auto bid to the NCAA tournament, where the Blue Devils were selected as a No. 1 seed for the second consecutive year. The Blue Devils were placed in the East Region and made quick work of Norfolk State and TCU before traveling 25 miles down the road to the Entertainment & Sports Arena. Duke may have found a second home away from home as the Blue Devils knocked off No. 14 Texas in the Sweet Sixteen, then avenged their only home loss of the season against No. 13 South Carolina in the Elite Eight to advance to the second Final Four in school history, a near Herculean feat considering the complete lack of depth, with the squad only rotating 8 players the majority of the season. The Blue Devils headed to the Alamodome in San Antonio, Texas for a date with the No. 1 seed out of the West region, and nationally ranked No. 2 Oklahoma in the national semifinal. The game didn’t go the way Duke wanted, as the Blue Devils fell to the Sooners 71–86, but it was still a season to remember. The 2001–02 squad accomplished many things no other team had done before in school history: went a perfect 19–0 in ACC contests, embarked on a school record 22-game winning streak, won a third consecutive ACC Tournament title, and broke 24 school records including the (then) mark for wins with 31— and all of this accomplished with only just eight players.

== Roster ==
2001–02 Duke Blue Devils women's basketball team
Players
Coaches

Pos.	#	Name	Height	Year	Previous school	Hometown
G/F	20	Alana Beard	5 ft 11 in (1.8 m)	So	Southwood	Frierson, Louisiana
G/F	25	Monique Currie	6 ft 0 in (1.83 m)	Fr	Bullis School	Washington, D.C.
G	5	Rometra Craig	5 ft 10 in (1.78 m)	So	Archbishop Mitty	Portola Valley, California
G	21	Krista Gingrich (C)	5 ft 9 in (1.75 m)	Sr	Lewistown	Lewistown, Pennsylvania
G	12	Vicki Krapohl	5 ft 5 in (1.65 m)	So	Mount Pleasant	Mount Pleasant, Michigan
G	3	Sheana Mosch (C)	5 ft 10 in (1.78 m)	Jr	DuBois Central Catholic	Clearfield, Pennsylvania
F	33	Iciss Tillis	6 ft 4 in (1.93 m)	So	Cascia Hall Prep	Tulsa, Oklahoma
G/F	41	Michele Matyasovsky	6 ft 1 in (1.85 m)	Jr	Triton	Somerdale, New Jersey
C	55	Crystal White	6 ft 5 in (1.96 m)	So	Mount Clemens	Clinton Township, Michigan
F/C	31	Wynter Whitley	6 ft 2 in (1.88 m)	Fr	Holy Innocents'	Atlanta, Georgia

Head coach

- Gail Goestenkors (Saginaw Valley State)

Assistant coach(es)

- Gale Valley (Michigan State)
- Joanne Boyle (Duke)
- Shaeeta Brown (Duke)
- Georgia Schweitzer (Duke)

Legend

- (C) Team captain
- (S) Suspended
- (I) Ineligible
- (W) Walk-on
- Injured
- Current redshirt

Roster
Last update: May 11, 2025

*Both Rometra Craig and Crystal White appeared in the first 7 games of the season before deciding to transfer. Both players made their final game appearances for Duke against Louisiana Tech on December 2, 2001.

== Schedule and results ==
Date time, TV	Rank^{#}	Opponent^{#}	Result	Record	Site city, state
Non-Conference Regular Season
November 11, 2001*; 12:00 pm, ESPN	No. 5	No. 7 Texas Tech; State Farm Tip-Off Classic	W 85–69	1–0	Cameron Indoor Stadium (6,204); Durham, North Carolina
November 16, 2001*	No. 5	Elon	W 102–52	2–0	Cameron Indoor Stadium (2,940); Durham, North Carolina
November 18, 2001*	No. 5	at Toledo	L 67–71	2–1	Savage Hall (5,002); Toledo, Ohio
November 24, 2001*	No. 9	Davidson; Duke Women's Basketball Classic – Semifinals	W 107–58	3–1	Cameron Indoor Stadium (3,571); Durham, North Carolina
November 25, 2001*	No. 9	South Carolina; Duke Women's Basketball Classic – Championship Game	L 81–87 ^{OT}	3–2	Cameron Indoor Stadium (3,620); Durham, North Carolina
November 29, 2001*	No. 14	at UNC Charlotte	W 64–39	4–2	Halton Arena (1,514); Charlotte, North Carolina
December 02, 2001*; 3:30 pm, ESPN2	No. 14	vs. No. 6 Louisiana Tech; Honda Elite 4 Holiday Classic	W 76–64	5–2	The Milk House (3,829); Bay Lake, Florida
December 06, 2001*	No. 11	at Virginia	W 107–73	6–2 (1–0)	University Hall (2,968); Charlottesville, Virginia
December 08, 2001*	No. 11	at Georgetown	W 89–54	7–2	McDonough Gymnasium (1,936); Washington, D.C.
December 16, 2001*	No. 8	UNC Greensboro	W 90–58	8–2	Cameron Indoor Stadium (2,212); Durham, North Carolina
December 20, 2001*	No. 8	Liberty	W 95–53	9–2	Cameron Indoor Stadium (2,107); Durham, North Carolina
December 27, 2001*; 12:30 pm, FSN South	No. 9	vs. No. 2 Tennessee; ACC-SEC Shootout	L 68–89	9–3	Philips Arena (7,811); Atlanta, Georgia
ACC Regular Season
December 30, 2001	No. 9	at Georgia Tech	W 76–60	10–3 (2–0)	Alexander Memorial Coliseum (1,854); Atlanta, Georgia
January 02, 2002	No. 11	Maryland	W 90–74	11–3 (3–0)	Cameron Indoor Stadium (804); Durham, North Carolina
January 06, 2002	No. 11	Wake Forest	W 91–46	12–3 (4–0)	Cameron Indoor Stadium (2,012); Durham, North Carolina
January 10, 2002	No. 7	at Clemson	W 81–58	13–3 (5–0)	Littlejohn Coliseum (3,380); Clemson, South Carolina
January 13, 2002	No. 7	at NC State	W 73–68	14–3 (6–0)	Reynolds Coliseum (5,431); Raleigh, North Carolina
January 20, 2002	No. 6	Virginia	W 86–69	15–3 (7–0)	Cameron Indoor Stadium (6,023); Durham, North Carolina
January 24, 2002	No. 5	No. 21 North Carolina; Rivalry Game	W 102–82	16–3 (8–0)	Cameron Indoor Stadium (6,904); Durham, North Carolina
January 27, 2002	No. 5	at Florida State	W 102–80	17–3 (9–0)	Tallahassee–Leon County Civic Center (1,235); Tallahassee, Florida
January 31, 2002	No. 5	Georgia Tech	W 86–50	18–3 (10–0)	Cameron Indoor Stadium (2,454); Durham, North Carolina
February 02, 2002	No. 5	at Maryland	W 66–55	19–3 (11–0)	Cole Field House (2,746); College Park, Maryland
February 07, 2002	No. 5	at Wake Forest	W 83–60	20–3 (12–0)	LJVM Coliseum (907); Winston-Salem, North Carolina
February 10, 2002	No. 5	Clemson	W 77–69	21–3 (13–0)	Cameron Indoor Stadium (4,473); Durham, North Carolina
February 18, 2002	No. 5	NC State	W 81–54	22–3 (14–0)	Cameron Indoor Stadium (5,672); Durham, North Carolina
February 21, 2002	No. 5	Florida State	W 88–55	23–3 (15–0)	Cameron Indoor Stadium (2,904); Durham, North Carolina
February 24, 2002	No. 5	at No. 19 North Carolina; Rivalry Game	W 90–75	24–3 (16–0)	Carmichael Auditorium (7,842); Chapel Hill, North Carolina
ACC Tournament
March 01, 2002*	(1) No. 4	vs. (9) Florida State; Quarterfinals	W 82–66	25–3	Greensboro Coliseum (4,956); Greensboro, North Carolina
March 03, 2002*; 1:00 pm, FSN	(1) No. 4	vs. (4) Virginia; Semifinals	W 71–67	26–3	Greensboro Coliseum (5,960); Greensboro, North Carolina
March 04, 2002*; 7:30 pm, FSN	(1) No. 3	vs. (2) No. 16 North Carolina; Rivalry Game/Championship Game	W 87–80	27–3	Greensboro Coliseum (9,204); Greensboro, North Carolina
NCAA Tournament
March 15, 2002*; 8:30 pm, ESPN	(1 E) No. 3	vs. (16 E) Norfolk State; First Round	W 95–48	28–3	Cameron Indoor Stadium (6,004); Durham, North Carolina
March 17, 2002*; 2:00 pm, ESPN2	(1 E) No. 3	vs. (8 E) TCU; Second Round	W 76–66	29–3	Cameron Indoor Stadium (4,794); Durham, North Carolina
March 23, 2002*; 2:00 pm, ESPN	(1 E) No. 3	vs. (4 E) No. 14 Texas; Sweet Sixteen	W 62–46	30–3	Entertainment & Sports Arena (4,613); Raleigh, North Carolina
March 25, 2002*; 7:00 pm, ESPN2	(1 E) No. 3	vs. (3 E) No. 13 South Carolina; Elite Eight	W 77–68	31–3	Entertainment & Sports Arena (8,107); Raleigh, North Carolina
March 29, 2002*; 7:00 pm, ESPN	(1 E) No. 3	vs. (1 W) No. 2 Oklahoma; Final Four	L 71–86	31–4	Alamodome (29,619); San Antonio, Texas
*Non-conference game. ^{#}Rankings from AP Poll. (#) Tournament seedings in parentheses. All times are in Eastern Time. E = East, W = West.

== Player statistics ==
Individual player statistics (Final)
			Minutes		Scoring		Total FGs			3-point FGs			Free-Throws			Rebounds							
Player	GP	GS	Tot	Avg	Pts	Avg	FG	FGA	Pct	3FG	3FA	Pct	FT	FTA	Pct	Off	Def	Tot	Avg	A	Stl	Blk	TO
Beard, Alana	35	35	1164	33.3	694	19.8	275	481	.572	25	66	.379	119	158	.753	69	144	213	6.1	154	114	25	93
Currie, Monique	35	22	971	27.7	502	14.3	178	360	.494	8	34	.235	138	179	.771	84	125	209	6.0	90	50	24	90
Gingrich, Krista	34	3	589	17.3	198	5.8	61	147	.415	53	114	.456	23	26	.885	3	55	58	1.7	88	14	3	55
Krapohl, Vicki	29	35	676	19.3	147	4.2	49	104	.471	46	97	.474	3	5	.600	10	64	74	2.1	94	40	1	44
Matyasovsky, Michele	35	17	751	21.5	224	6.4	90	174	.517	14	39	.359	30	33	.909	54	76	130	3.7	34	25	16	47
Mosch, Sheana	35	15	868	24.8	320	9.1	109	243	.449	12	39	.308	90	108	.833	38	85	123	3.5	86	33	5	57
Tillis, Iciss	34	33	1032	30.4	486	14.3	197	436	.452	30	89	.337	62	91	.681	68	205	271	8.0	94	79	30	99
Whitley, Wynter	35	20	772	22.1	272	7.8	89	185	.481	10	32	.313	84	118	.712	47	124	171	4.9	26	37	16	67
TEAM																59	80	139	4.0				9
Total	35		7026		2922	83.5	1080	2203	.490	199	520	.383	563	741	.760	444	981	1425	40.7	678	404	129	581
Opponents	35		7026		2249	64.3	835	2194	.381	164	533	.308	415	596	.696	460	778	1238	35.4	433	273	72	688

* Rometra Craig and Crystal White season totals absent from statistic table.

Legend
GP	Games played	GS	Games started	Avg	Average per game
FG	Field-goals made	FGA	Field-goal attempts	Off	Offensive rebounds
Def	Defensive rebounds	A	Assists	TO	Turnovers
Blk	Blocks	Stl	Steals

== Rankings ==
Ranking movements Legend: ██ Increase in ranking ██ Decrease in ranking
	Week																			
Poll	Pre	1	2	3	4	5	6	7	8	9	10	11	12	13	14	15	16	17	18	Final
AP	Not released	5	9	14	11	8	8	9	11	7	6	5	5	5	5	5	4	3	3	Not released
Coaches	4	4	7	12	9	8	8	9	10	7	6	6	5	5	5	5	4	3	3	4

== See also ==
- 2001-02 Duke Blue Devils men's basketball team
