= 2002 Big 12 Conference women's basketball tournament =

- Classification: Division I
- Teams: 12
- Site: Municipal Auditorium; Kansas City, Missouri
- Champions: Oklahoma (1st title)
- Winning coach: Sherri Coale (1st title)
- MVP: Stacey Dales (Oklahoma)
- Attendance: 32,953 (overall); 6,197 (championship)
- Television: FSN

2001–02 Big 12 Conference women's basketball standings
	Conf.				Overall
Team	W		L	PCT	W		L	PCT
No. 2 Oklahoma †	14	–	2	.875	32	–	4	.889
No. 7 Baylor	12	–	4	.750	27	–	6	.818
No. 12 Colorado	11	–	5	.688	24	–	10	.706
No. 11 Kansas State	11	–	5	.688	26	–	8	.765
No. 14 Texas	10	–	6	.625	22	–	10	.688
No. 10 Iowa State	9	–	7	.563	24	–	9	.727
No. 17 Texas Tech	8	–	8	.500	20	–	12	.625
Oklahoma State	7	–	9	.438	16	–	15	.516
Texas A&M	5	–	11	.313	13	–	16	.448
Missouri	5	–	11	.313	14	–	15	.483
Nebraska	4	–	12	.250	14	–	16	.467
Kansas	0	–	16	.000	5	–	25	.167
† 2002 Big 12 Tournament winner Rankings from AP poll

The 2002 Big 12 Conference women's basketball tournament was held March 5–9, 2002, at Municipal Auditorium in Kansas City, MO.

Number 1 seed Oklahoma defeated number 2 seed Baylor 84–69 to win their first championship and receive the conference's automatic bid to the 2002 NCAA tournament.

== Seeding ==
The Tournament consisted of a 12 team single-elimination tournament with the top 4 seeds receiving a bye.

2002 Big 12 Conference women's basketball tournament seeds
Seed	School	Conf.	Over.	Tiebreaker
1	Oklahoma ‡#	14–2	32–4	
2	Baylor #	12–4	27–6	
3	Colorado #	11–5	24–10	
4	Kansas State #	11–5	26–8	
5	Texas	10–6	22–10	
6	Iowa State	9–7	24–9	
7	Texas Tech	8–8	20–12	
8	Oklahoma State	7–9	16–15	
9	Texas A&M	5–11	13–16	
10	Missouri	5–11	14–15	
11	Nebraska	4–12	14–16	
12	Kansas	0–16	5–25	
‡ – Big 12 Conference regular season champions, and tournament No. 1 seed. # – Received a single-bye in the conference tournament. Overall records include all games played in the Big 12 Conference tournament.

== Schedule ==
Session	Game	Time	Matchup	Television	Attendance
First round – Tuesday, March 5
1	1	12:00 pm	#8 Oklahoma State 92 vs #9 Texas A&M 76		4,652
1	2	2:30 pm	#5 Texas 63 vs #12 Kansas 61		4,652
2	3	6:00 pm	#7 Texas Tech 78 vs #10 Missouri 51		7,126
2	4	8:30 pm	#6 Iowa State 74 vs #11 Nebraska 55		7,126
Quarterfinals – Wednesday, March 6
3	5	12:00 pm	#1 Oklahoma 87 vs #8 Oklahoma State 56	FSN	4,781
3	6	2:30 pm	#4 Kansas State 79 vs #5 Texas 63	FSN	4,781
4	7	6:00 pm	#2 Baylor 75 vs #7 Texas Tech 60	FSN	4,715
4	8	8:30 pm	#6 Iowa State 58 vs #3 Colorado 56	FSN	4,715
Semifinals – Thursday, March 7
5	9	6:00 pm	#1 Oklahoma 69 vs #4 Kansas State 49	FSN	5,482
5	10	8:30 pm	#2 Baylor 91 vs #6 Iowa State 83	FSN	5,482
Final – Saturday, March 9
6	11	6:00 pm	#1 Oklahoma 84 vs #2 Baylor 69	FSN	6,197
Game times in CT. #-Rankings denote tournament seed

== Tournament ==
First round Tuesday, March 5
8	Oklahoma State	92
9	Texas A&M	76
5	Texas	63
12	Kansas State	61
6	Iowa State	74
11	Nebraska	55
7	Texas Tech	78
10	Missouri	51

Quarterfinals; Wednesday, March 6
1	Oklahoma	87
8	Oklahoma State	56
4	Kansas State	79
5	Texas	63
3	Colorado	56
6	Iowa State	58
2	Baylor	75
7	Texas Tech	60

Semifinals; Thursday, March 7
1	Oklahoma	69
4	Kansas State	49
6	Iowa State	83
2	Baylor	91

Finals; Saturday, March 9
1	Oklahoma	84
2	Baylor	69

== All-Tournament team ==
Most Outstanding Player – Stacey Dales, Oklahoma

Player	Team
Stacey Dales	Oklahoma
Sheila Lambert	Baylor
Dionnah Jackson	Oklahoma
Danielle Crockrom	Baylor
Angie Welle	Iowa State
Kendra Wecker	Kansas State

== See also ==
- 2002 Big 12 Conference men's basketball tournament
- 2002 NCAA Division I women's basketball tournament
- 2001–02 NCAA Division I women's basketball rankings
