= 2001–02 Clemson Tigers women's basketball team =

Women's college basketball season

2001–02 Clemson Tigers women's basketball

NCAA Tournament, First Round
- Conference: Atlantic Coast Conference
- Record: 17–12 (9–7 ACC)
- Head coach: Jim Davis (15th season)
- Home arena: Littlejohn Coliseum

The 2001–02 Clemson Tigers women's basketball team represented Clemson University during the 2001–02 NCAA Division I women's basketball season. The Tigers were led by fifteenth year head coach Jim Davis. The Tigers, members of the Atlantic Coast Conference, played their home games at Littlejohn Coliseum.

== Schedule ==
Date time, TV	Rank^{#}	Opponent^{#}	Result	Record	Site city, state
November 16, 2001*		East Carolina	W 67–53	1–0	Littlejohn Coliseum; Clemson, South Carolina
November 19, 2001*		Illinois	W 73–62	2–0	Littlejohn Coliseum; Clemson, South Carolina
November 25, 2001*		vs. Massachusetts	L 54–57	2–1	Norwich, Connecticut
November 28, 2001*		No. 25 South Carolina rivalry	W 71–63	3–1	Littlejohn Coliseum; Clemson, South Carolina
December 2, 2001*		at Furman	L 57–59	3–2	Timmons Arena; Greenville, South Carolina
December 5, 2001		at Maryland	L 59–70	3–3 (0–1)	Cole Field House; College Park, Maryland
December 8, 2001*		Miami (OH)	W 72–55	4–3 (0–1)	Littlejohn Coliseum; Clemson, South Carolina
December 15, 2001*		Winthrop	W 86–43	5–3 (0–1)	Littlejohn Coliseum; Clemson, South Carolina
December 18, 2001*		at No. 24 Penn State	W 73–69	6–3 (0–1)	Bryce Jordan Center; University Park, Pennsylvania
December 20, 2001*		Charleston Southern	W 68–48	7–3 (0–1)	Littlejohn Coliseum; Clemson, South Carolina
December 28, 2001*		at Hartford	W 60–46	8–3 (0–1)	Chase Arena at Reich Family Pavilion; West Hartford, Connecticut
December 30, 2001		Florida State	W 74–70	9–3 (1–1)	Littlejohn Coliseum; Clemson, South Carolina
January 3, 2002*		at Virginia Tech	L 58–68	9–4 (1–1)	Cassell Coliseum; Blacksburg, Virginia
January 7, 2002		at Virginia	W 79–68	10–4 (2–1)	University Hall; Charlottesville, Virginia
January 10, 2002		No. 7 Duke	L 58–81	10–5 (2–2)	Littlejohn Coliseum; Clemson, South Carolina
January 13, 2002		No. 16 North Carolina	L 85–89	10–6 (2–3)	Littlejohn Coliseum; Clemson, South Carolina
January 17, 2002		at Wake Forest	L 46–58	10–7 (2–4)	LJVM Coliseum; Winston-Salem, North Carolina
January 21, 2002		Maryland	W 60–47	11–7 (3–4)	Littlejohn Coliseum; Clemson, South Carolina
January 24, 2002		NC State	W 62–51	12–7 (4–4)	Littlejohn Coliseum; Clemson, South Carolina
January 26, 2002		at Georgia Tech	L 78–83	12–8 (4–5)	Alexander Memorial Coliseum; Atlanta, Georgia
January 31, 2002		at Florida State	W 56–43	13–8 (5–5)	Tallahassee–Leon County Civic Center; Tallahassee, Florida
February 7, 2002		Virginia	W 73–65	14–8 (6–5)	Littlejohn Coliseum; Clemson, South Carolina
February 10, 2002		at No. 5 Duke	L 69–77	14–9 (6–6)	Cameron Indoor Stadium; Durham, North Carolina
February 14, 2002		at No. 20 North Carolina	L 76–86	14–10 (6–7)	Carmichael Arena; Chapel Hill, North Carolina
February 17, 2002		Wake Forest	W 65–46	15–10 (7–7)	Littlejohn Coliseum; Clemson, South Carolina
February 21, 2002		Georgia Tech	W 68–65	16–10 (8–7)	Littlejohn Coliseum; Clemson, South Carolina
February 25, 2002		at NC State	W 63–52	17–10 (9–7)	Reynolds Coliseum; Raleigh, North Carolina
ACC Tournament
March 2, 2002*		vs. NC State; ACC Tournament quarterfinal	L 52–61	17–11 (9–7)	Greensboro Coliseum; Greensboro, North Carolina
NCAA Tournament
March 15, 2002*		vs. Arkansas; NCAA Tournament first round	L 68–78	17–12 (9–7)	Bramlage Coliseum; Manhattan, Kansas
*Non-conference game. ^{#}Rankings from AP Poll. (#) Tournament seedings in parentheses.
