= 2001–02 Oklahoma Sooners women's basketball team =

American college basketball season

2001–02 Oklahoma Sooners women's basketball

Big 12 Conference Champion

NCAA tournament Runner-up
- Conference: Big 12 Conference

Ranking
- AP: No. 2
- Record: 32–4 (14–2 Big 12)
- Head coach: Sherri Coale (6th season)
- Assistant coach: Bo Overton
- Home arena: Lloyd Noble Center

2001–02 Big 12 Conference women's basketball standings
	Conf.				Overall
Team	W		L	PCT	W		L	PCT
No. 2 Oklahoma †	14	–	2	.875	32	–	4	.889
No. 7 Baylor	12	–	4	.750	27	–	6	.818
No. 12 Colorado	11	–	5	.688	24	–	10	.706
No. 11 Kansas State	11	–	5	.688	26	–	8	.765
No. 14 Texas	10	–	6	.625	22	–	10	.688
No. 10 Iowa State	9	–	7	.563	24	–	9	.727
No. 17 Texas Tech	8	–	8	.500	20	–	12	.625
Oklahoma State	7	–	9	.438	16	–	15	.516
Texas A&M	5	–	11	.313	13	–	16	.448
Missouri	5	–	11	.313	14	–	15	.483
Nebraska	4	–	12	.250	14	–	16	.467
Kansas	0	–	16	.000	5	–	25	.167
† 2002 Big 12 Tournament winner Rankings from AP poll

The 2001–02 Oklahoma Sooners women's basketball team represented the University of Oklahoma in college basketball during the 2001–02 NCAA Division I women's basketball season. The Oklahoma Sooners women's basketball team was a member of the National Collegiate Athletic Association's (NCAA) Big 12 Conference. The team was led by Sherri Coale in her sixth season as head coach of the Sooners. Oklahoma posted a 32–4 overall record and a 14–2 conference record. The Sooners won the Big 12 regular season and conference tournament championships. The Sooners advanced to the 2002 NCAA Division I women's basketball tournament and lost to UConn in the national title game.

== Roster ==
2001–02 Oklahoma Sooners women's basketball team
Players
Coaches

Pos.	#	Name	Height	Year	Hometown
F	10	Caton Hill	6 ft 1 in (1.85 m)	Jr	Ada, Oklahoma
G	20	LaNeishea Caufield	5 ft 9 in (1.75 m)	Sr	Ada, Oklahoma
G/F	21	Stacey Dales	6 ft 0 in (1.83 m)	Sr	Brockville, Ontario
G	33	Rosalind Ross	5 ft 9 in (1.75 m)	Sr	Milwaukee, Wisconsin
G	35	Dionnah Jackson	5 ft 9 in (1.75 m)	Fr	St. Louis, Missouri
F	45	Jamie Talbert	6 ft 2 in (1.88 m)	Sr	Elkhart, Kansas

Head coach

- Sherri Coale

Assistant coach(es)

Legend

- (C) Team captain
- (S) Suspended
- (I) Ineligible
- (W) Walk-on
- Injured
- Current redshirt

== Schedule ==
Date time, TV	Rank^{#}	Opponent^{#}	Result	Record	Site city, state
Regular season
November 11, 2001*	No. 4	vs. No. 11 Purdue; State Farm Tip-Off Classic	W 80–75	1–0	Cameron Indoor Stadium; Durham, North Carolina
November 17, 2001*	No. 4	vs. Oral Roberts; Bertha Teague Classic	W 73–38	2–0	Gallagher-Iba Arena; Stillwater, Oklahoma
November 18, 2001*	No. 4	vs. Tulsa; Bertha Teague Classic	W 75–52	3–0	Gallagher-Iba Arena; Stillwater, Oklahoma
November 23, 2001*	No. 3	vs. Butler; UTSA Tournament	W 90–44	4–0	Convocation Center; San Antonio, Texas
November 24, 2001*	No. 3	North Texas; UTSA Tournament	W 83–68	5–0	Convocation Center; San Antonio, Texas
November 27, 2001*	No. 3	TCU	W 76–60	6–0	Lloyd Noble Center; Norman, Oklahoma
November 29, 2001*	No. 3	Wichita State	W 89–68	7–0	Lloyd Noble Center; Norman, Oklahoma
December 5, 2001*	No. 3	at SMU	W 91–70	8–0	Moody Coliseum; Dallas, Texas
December 8, 2001*	No. 3	Montana State	W 86–62	9–0	Lloyd Noble Center; Norman, Oklahoma
December 16, 2001*	No. 3	Illinois; Big 12/Big Ten Challenge	W 91–69	10–0	Lloyd Noble Center; Norman, Oklahoma
December 22, 2001*	No. 3	at No. 1 UConn	L 72–86	10–1	XL Center; Hartford, Connecticut
January 2, 2002	No. 3	No. 16 Colorado	W 78–67	11–1 (1–0)	Lloyd Noble Center; Norman, Oklahoma
January 5, 2002	No. 3	at No. 9 Texas Tech	W 80–68	12–1 (2–0)	United Spirit Arena; Lubbock, Texas
January 9, 2002	No. 3	Oklahoma State; Bedlam Series	W 65–48	13–1 (3–0)	Lloyd Noble Center; Norman, Oklahoma
January 12, 2002	No. 3	No. 12 Baylor	W 82–73	14–1 (4–0)	Ferrell Center; Waco, Texas
January 15, 2002	No. 3	No. 9 Iowa State	L 66–82	14–2 (4–1)	Hilton Coliseum; Ames, Iowa
January 19, 2002	No. 3	No. 12 Texas	W 89–69	15–2 (5–1)	Lloyd Noble Center; Norman, Oklahoma
January 26, 2002	No. 4	at Texas A&M	W 72–40	16–2 (6–1)	Reed Arena; College Station, Texas
January 29, 2002	No. 4	at Oklahoma State; Bedlam Series	W 66–58	17–2 (7–1)	Gallagher-Iba Arena; Stillwater, Oklahoma
February 2, 2002	No. 4	Kansas	W 79–57	18–2 (8–1)	Lloyd Noble Center; Norman, Oklahoma
February 5, 2002	No. 4	No. 10 Baylor	W 69–60	19–2 (9–1)	Lloyd Noble Center; Norman, Oklahoma
February 9, 2002	No. 4	at Texas A&M	W 67–51	20–2 (10–1)	Lloyd Noble Center; Norman, Oklahoma
February 13, 2002	No. 4	No. 12 Kansas State	W 76–68	21–2 (11–1)	Bramlage Coliseum; Manhattan, Kansas
February 16, 2002	No. 4	Nebraska	W 81–47	22–2 (12–1)	Lloyd Noble Center; Norman, Oklahoma
February 19, 2002	No. 3	at No. 12 Texas	L 62–68 ^{OT}	12–3 (12–2)	Frank Erwin Center; Austin, Texas
February 23, 2002	No. 3	at Missouri	W 90–70	23–3 (13–2)	Hearnes Center; Columbia, Missouri
February 27, 2002	No. 5	No. 15 Texas Tech	W 75–56	24–3 (14–2)	Lloyd Noble Center; Norman, Oklahoma
Big 12 Women's Tournament
March 6, 2002	(1) No. 4	vs. (8) Oklahoma State; Quarterfinal, Bedlam Series	W 87–56	25–3	Municipal Auditorium; Kansas City, Missouri
March 7, 2002	(1) No. 4	vs. (4) No. 13 Kansas State; Semifinal	W 69–49	26–3	Municipal Auditorium; Kansas City, Missouri
March 9, 2002	(1) No. 4	vs. (2) No. 17 Baylor; Championship	W 84–69	27–3	Municipal Auditorium; Kansas City, Missouri
NCAA Women's Tournament
March 16, 2002	(1 W) No. 4	vs. (16) Hartford; First Round	W 84–52	28–3	Lloyd Noble Center; Norman, Oklahoma
March 18, 2002	(1 W) No. 4	vs. (9) Villanova; Second Round	W 66–53	29–3	Lloyd Noble Center; Norman, Oklahoma
March 23, 2002	(1 W) No. 4	vs. (4 W) No. 12 Texas Tech; Sweet Sixteen	W 72–62	30–3	Taco Bell Arena; Boise, Idaho
March 25, 2002	(1 W) No. 4	vs. (3 W) No. 17 Colorado; Elite Eight	W 94–60	31–3	Taco Bell Arena; Boise, Idaho
March 29, 2002	(1 W) No. 4	vs. (1 E) No. 3 Duke; Final Four	W 86–71	32–3	Alamodome; San Antonio, Texas
March 31, 2002	(1 W) No. 4	vs. (1 ME) No. 1 UConn; National championship	L 70–82	32–4	Alamodome; San Antonio, Texas
*Non-conference game. ^{#}Rankings from AP Poll. (#) Tournament seedings in parentheses. W=West. All times are in Central Time.
