= 2001–02 Tennessee Lady Volunteers basketball team =

2001–02 Tennessee Lady Volunteers basketball season

2001–02 Tennessee Lady Volunteers basketball

SEC regular season champions

NCAA tournament, Final Four
- Conference: Southeastern Conference

Ranking
- Coaches: No. 3
- AP: No. 6
- Record: 29–5 (13–1 SEC)
- Head coach: Pat Summitt (28th season)
- Assistant coaches: Mickie DeMoss (17th season); Holly Warlick (17th season); Al Brown (9th season)
- Home arena: Thompson–Boling Arena

The 2001–02 Tennessee Lady Volunteers basketball team represented the University of Tennessee as a member of the Southeastern Conference during the 2001–02 women's college basketball season. Coached by Pat Summitt, the Lady Volunteers played their home games at Thompson–Boling Arena in Knoxville, Tennessee. The team won the SEC regular season title, reached the Final Four of the NCAA tournament, and finished the season with a 29–5 record (13–1 SEC).

== Roster ==
2001–02 Tennessee Lady Volunteers women's basketball team
Players
Coaches

Pos.	#	Name	Height	Year	Previous school	Hometown
C	00	Michelle Snow	6 ft 5 in (1.96 m)	Sr	Pensacola	Pensacola, Florida
F	4	LaToya Davis	6 ft 0 in (1.83 m)	So	Mary Persons	Forsyth, Georgia
G	3	Tasha Butts	5 ft 11 in (1.8 m)	So	Baldwin	Milledgeville, Georgia
G	10	April McDivitt	5 ft 7 in (1.7 m)	Jr	Connersville	Connersville, Indiana
F	13	Gwen Jackson	6 ft 2 in (1.88 m)	Jr	Eufaula	Eufaula, Alabama
G/F	20	Kara Lawson	5 ft 9 in (1.75 m)	Jr	West Springfield	Alexandria, Virginia
G	21	Loree Moore	5 ft 9 in (1.75 m)	Fr	Narbonne	Carson, California
G/F	25	Brittany Jackson	6 ft 0 in (1.83 m)	Fr	Bradley Central	Cleveland, Tennessee
C	33	Ashley Robinson	6 ft 5 in (1.96 m)	So	South Grand Prairie	Grand Prairie, Texas
F	43	Shyra Ely	6 ft 2 in (1.88 m)	Fr	Ben Davis	Indianapolis, Indiana
F/C	42	Courtney McDaniel	6 ft 1 in (1.85 m)	So	Tennessee High	Bristol, Tennessee
F	14	Michelle Muňoz	6 ft 1 in (1.85 m)	Fr	Mason	Cincinnati, Ohio
C	50	Shalon Pillow	6 ft 3 in (1.91 m)	Sr	Taylor	Addyston, Ohio
F	11	Amanda Canon	5 ft 11 in (1.8 m)	Sr	Shelbyville Central	Shelbyville, Tennessee

Head coach

- Pat Summitt (UT Martin)

Assistant coach(es)

- Mickie DeMoss (Louisiana Tech)
- Holly Warlick (Tennessee)
- Al Brown (Purdue)

Legend

- (C) Team captain
- (S) Suspended
- (I) Ineligible
- (W) Walk-on
- Injured
- Current redshirt

Roster
Last update: May 19, 2025

== Schedule and results ==
Date time, TV	Rank^{#}	Opponent^{#}	Result	Record	High points	High rebounds	High assists	Site city, state
Non-conference regular season
November 16, 2001*	No. 2	at Chattanooga	W 97–57	1–0	16 – Ely	8 – McDaniel	4 – Tied	McKenzie Arena (9,113); Chattanooga, Tennessee
November 18, 2001*	No. 2	USC	W 106–66	2–0	22 – Ely	7 – Ely	6 – Moore	Thompson–Boling Arena (11,887); Knoxville, Tennessee
November 23, 2001*; 7:00 pm, CSS	No. 2	No. 5 Louisiana Tech	W 90–75	3–0	27 – Snow	8 – Tied	6 – Lawson	Thompson–Boling Arena (15,556); Knoxville, Tennessee
November 27, 2001*	No. 2	at No. 25 George Washington	W 88–57	4–0	14 – Ely	9 – Snow	5 – Lawson	Charles E. Smith Center (5,252); Washington, D.C.
December 02, 2001*; 1:00 pm, ESPN	No. 2	vs. No. 8 NC State; Honda Elite 4 Holiday Classic	W 93–56	5–0	20 – Lawson	12 – G. Jackson	6 – Moore	The Milk House (4,256); Bay Lake, Florida
December 05, 2001*	No. 2	at Boston College	W 75–66	6–0	16 – Lawson	9 – Snow	6 – Moore	Conte Forum (7,068); Chestnut Hill, Massachusetts
December 16, 2001*; 4:00 pm, FSN South	No. 2	at No. 6 Stanford	W 68–62	7–0	24 – Snow	7 – Snow	4 – Tied	Maples Pavilion (7,391); Palo Alto, California
December 19, 2001*	No. 2	at DePaul	W 80–66	8–0	17 – G. Jackson	12 – Lawson	5 – Lawson	DePaul Athletic Center (3,025); Chicago, Illinois
December 27, 2001*; 12:30 pm, FSN South	No. 2	vs. No. 9 Duke	W 89–68	9–0	20 – G. Jackson	10 – Tied	6 – McDivitt	Philips Arena (7,811); Atlanta, Georgia
December 29, 2001*; 6:00 pm, CSS	No. 2	at Memphis	W 92–66	10–0	18 – G. Jackson	7 – Tied	5 – Lawson	The Pyramid (8,223); Memphis, Tennessee
January 03, 2002; 6:05 pm, CSS	No. 2	at No. 15 Florida	W 88–64	11–0 (1–0)	12 – Tied	11 – G. Jackson	4 – Moore	O'Connell Center (2,706); Gainesville, Florida
January 05, 2002*; 4:00 pm, CBS	No. 2	No. 1 Connecticut	L 72–86	11–1	17 – Lawson	7 – Tied	4 – Moore	Thompson–Boling Arena (24,611); Knoxville, Tennessee
January 08, 2002*; 7:00 pm, CSS	No. 2	No. 25 Old Dominion	W 74–62	12–1	19 – Snow	9 – Snow	9 – Lawson	Thompson–Boling Arena (12,210); Knoxville, Tennessee
SEC Regular Season
January 10, 2002; 7:00 pm, CSS	No. 2	No. 19 Auburn	W 71–50	13–1 (2–0)	18 – Snow	5 – Tied	5 – Moore	Thompson–Boling Arena (11,394); Knoxville, Tennessee
January 13, 2002; 3:00 pm, FSN South	No. 2	No. 24 LSU	W 79–67	14–1 (3–0)	17 – Lawson	7 – Tied	4 – Moore	Thompson–Boling Arena (13,544); Knoxville, Tennessee
January 17, 2002; 7:00 pm, CSS	No. 2	at No. 8 South Carolina	W 80–61	15–1 (4–0)	19 – Lawson	9 – G. Jackson	6 – Moore	Carolina Coliseum (12,168); Columbia, South Carolina
January 20, 2002	No. 2	Alabama	W 82–57	16–1 (5–0)	14 – Muñoz	6 – Snow	6 – Moore	Thompson–Boling Arena (14,860); Knoxville, Tennessee
January 27, 2002	No. 2	at No. 22 Auburn	W 66–53	17–1 (6–0)	23 – Lawson	8 – Lawson	5 – Moore	Beard–Eaves Coliseum (6,614); Auburn, Alabama
January 31, 2002	No. 2	No. 12 Florida	W 86–66	18–1 (7–0)	18 – Lawson	10 – Snow	8 – Moore	Thompson–Boling Arena (12,213); Knoxville, Tennessee
February 02, 2002; 6:30 pm, ESPN2	No. 2	at No. 8 Vanderbilt	L 59–76	18–2 (7–1)	13 – McDivitt	6 – Snow	2 – Tied	Memorial Gymnasium (14,168); Nashville, Tennessee
February 07, 2002; 7:00 pm, CSS	No. 3	Arkansas	W 93–65	19–2 (8–1)	30 – Lawson	7 – Tied	6 – Moore	Thompson–Boling Arena (18,410); Knoxville, Tennessee
February 10, 2002; 3:00 pm, FSN South	No. 3	at No. 22 Georgia	W 52–50	20–2 (9–1)	12 – Tied	6 – Snow	4 – McDivitt	Stegeman Coliseum (10,082); Athens, Georgia
February 12, 2002*; 7:00 pm, FSN South	No. 3	No. 18 Texas	L 66–69	20–3	16 – Snow	10 – Snow	5 – Moore	Thompson–Boling Arena (11,928); Knoxville, Tennessee
February 14, 2002	No. 3	at Mississippi State	W 80–78	21–3 (10–1)	29 – Lawson	8 – Ely	5 – Moore	Humphrey Coliseum (5,517); Starkville, Mississippi
February 16, 2002; 7:00 pm, FSN South	No. 3	No. 6 Vanderbilt	W 75–68	22–3 (11–1)	26 – Lawson	5 – Tied	5 – Moore	Thompson–Boling Arena (20,956); Knoxville, Tennessee
February 21, 2002; 8:00 pm, CSS	No. 4	at Ole Miss	W 86–69	23–3 (12–1)	24 – Lawson	13 – McDaniel	6 – Moore	Tad Smith Coliseum (2,378); Oxford, Mississippi
February 24, 2002	No. 4	Kentucky; Senior Day	W 89–64	24–3 (13–1)	18 – Lawson	7 – Tied	4 – Tied	Thompson–Boling Arena (20,573); Knoxville, Tennessee
SEC Tournament
March 01, 2002*	(1) No. 4	vs. (9) No. 24 Georgia; Quarterfinals	W 81–67	25–3	31 – Ely	11 – Ely	3 – Moore	Gaylord Entertainment Center (7,678); Nashville, Tennessee
March 02, 2002*	(1) No. 4	vs. (4) LSU; Semifinals	L 80–81	25–4	27 – Lawson	9 – Tied	3 – Tied	Gaylord Entertainment Center (11,264); Nashville, Tennessee
NCAA Tournament
March 16, 2002*	(2 MW) No. 6	(15 MW) Georgia State; First Round	W 98–68	26–4	28 – G. Jackson	10 – G. Jackson	7 – Moore	Thompson–Boling Arena (6,191); Knoxville, Tennessee
March 18, 2002*; 7:00 pm, ESPN2	(2 MW) No. 6	(7 MW) Notre Dame; Second Round	W 89–50	27–4	15 – Lawson	9 – McDaniel	4 – B. Jackson	Thompson–Boling Arena; Knoxville, Tennessee
Mar 23, 2002*; 7:00 pm, ESPN	(2 MW) No. 6	vs. (11 MW) BYU; Sweet Sixteen	W 68–57	28–4	21 – Ely	7 – Ely	3 – Tied	Hilton Coliseum (8,407); Ames, Iowa
March 25, 2002*; 9:37 pm, ESPN2	(2 MW) No. 6	vs. (1 MW) No. 3 Vanderbilt; Elite Eight	W 68–63	29–4	18 – G. Jackson	12 – G. Jackson	3 – Tied	Hilton Coliseum (8,206); Ames, Iowa
March 29, 2002*; 8:34 pm, ESPN	(2 MW) No. 6	vs. (1 E) No. 1 Connecticut; Final Four	L 56–79	29–5	9 – Lawson	8 – Snow	2 – Tied	Alamodome (29,619); San Antonio, Texas
*Non-conference game. ^{#}Rankings from AP Poll. (#) Tournament seedings in parentheses. All times are in Eastern Time. MW = Mid-West, E = East.

== Rankings ==
Ranking movements Legend: ██ Increase in ranking ██ Decrease in ranking
	Week																			
Poll	Pre	1	2	3	4	5	6	7	8	9	10	11	12	13	14	15	16	17	18	Final
AP	Not released	2	2	2	2	2	2	2	2	2	2	2	2	3	3	4	3	6	6	Not released
Coaches	2	2	2	2	2	2	2	2	2	3	3	2	2	4	4	4	3	6	6	3
