= 2002 NCAA Division I women's basketball tournament =

American college basketball tournament

- Teams: 64
- Finals site: Alamodome, San Antonio, Texas
- Champions: Connecticut Huskies (3rd title, 3rd title game, 6th Final Four)
- Runner-up: Oklahoma Sooners (1st title game, 1st Final Four)
- Semifinalists: Tennessee Lady Volunteers (13th Final Four); Duke Blue Devils (2nd Final Four)
- Winning coach: Geno Auriemma (3rd title)
- MOP: Swin Cash (Connecticut)

The 2002 NCAA Division I women's basketball tournament concluded on March 31, 2002 when Connecticut won the national title. The Final Four was held at the Alamodome in San Antonio on March 29–31, 2002. Connecticut, coached by Geno Auriemma, defeated Oklahoma 82-70 in the championship game.

== Notable events ==
After wins in the first three rounds, Connecticut faced Old Dominion in the Mideast regional finals. The opening 16 minutes were described as "near-perfect", as the Huskies hit over 90% of their shots (19 of 21) and had a 49–28 lead. That 21-point margin would match the final margin, as the Huskies would move on to the Final Four. Sue Bird scored 26 points, a career high, and eleven assist. The team recorded 25 assists, which brought their season total to 811, a new NCAA season record.

In the other three regions, number one seeds Oklahoma and Duke and number two seed Tennessee advanced to the Final Four. A dozen years earlier, Oklahoma attempted to eliminate the women's basketball program, but now the program had advanced to its first Final Four, and faced Duke in one semifinal game. Duke opened the game with a 13–7 run, but the Sooners responded with 12 consecutive points. Oklahoma managed to get to a 17-point lead in the second half, but Duke cut the lead to only two points with just under eight minutes to go. Oklahoma responded with a 16–3 run to take a decisive lead, and won the game 86–71 to head to the national championship game.

In the other semifinal, UConn faced Tennessee. Although Tennessee scored first, but that would be the last time they would lead. The Huskies responded, opened up an early lead, and extended it to 13 points at halftime. Connecticut extended the lead in the beginning of the second half, with a 24–11 run, and went on to hold the Lady Vols to 31% shooting. No Tennessee player scored in double digits; Kara Lawson led the team with nine points. The win extended the perfect season by Connecticut to 38 games, while marking the fourth time in the last five meetings that the Huskies had beaten the Lady Vols.

In the championship game, the Sooners were out rebounded and outshot, but did not give up. Oklahoma did not give up a single three point shot, the first time that has occurred in an NCAA title game, and the last time that would happen to the Connecticut team in any game for over a decade. With a minute and a half to go, the Huskies held a lead, but only six points. UConn had the ball, and despite having four seniors on the floor who would go 1,2 4 and 6 in the 2002 WNBA Draft, gave the ball to sophomore Diana Taurasi, who backed down Oklahoma's Stacy Dales then took a turn around jumper then went in, while Dales fouled Taurasi to foul out of the game. Taurasi hit the foul shot to extend the lead to nine points, and the Huskies would go on to be the first team in history to record two undefeated seasons, winning their third national championship.

The championship game attendance of 29,619 set the still-standing attendance record for an official game in women's basketball history. A 2023 exhibition between Iowa and DePaul held at Kinnick Stadium, home to Iowa football, had an attendance of 55,646.

== Tournament records ==
- Fewest turnovers – Louisiana Tech committed only three turnovers in the East regional first-round game against UC Santa Barbara, setting the record for fewest turnovers in an NCAA tournament game. Unfortunately for the Lady Techsters, the low number of turnovers could not prevent UCSB from winning.
- Free throws – Sue Bird hit 20 free throws out of 20 attempts, one of several players to hit 100% of their free throws in an NCAA tournament; 20 is the largest such total.
- Assists – Connecticut recorded 128 assists, setting the record for most assists in an NCAA tournament
- Blocks – Connecticut recorded 53 blocks, setting the record for blocks in an NCAA tournament

== Qualifying teams – automatic ==
Sixty-four teams were selected to participate in the 2002 NCAA Tournament. Thirty-one conferences were eligible for an automatic bid to the 2002 NCAA tournament.

Automatic bids
		Record		
Qualifying School	Conference	Regular Season	Conference	Seed
Arizona State University	Pac-10	24–8	12–6	9
Austin Peay State University	Ohio Valley Conference	19–11	9–7	15
Bucknell University	Patriot League	21–9	11–3	15
Brigham Young University	Mountain West	22–8	10–4	11
University of Tennessee at Chattanooga	Southern Conference	23–7	14–4	13
University of Cincinnati	Conference USA	26–4	11–3	6
University of Connecticut	Big East	33–0	16–0	1
Creighton University	Missouri Valley Conference	24–6	16–2	12
Duke University	ACC	27–3	16–0	1
Florida International University	Sun Belt Conference	26–5	13–1	5
Georgia State University	Atlantic Sun Conference	21–9	14–6	15
University of Wisconsin–Green Bay	Horizon League	24–6	15–1	13
University of Hartford	America East	16–14	9–7	16
Harvard University	Ivy League	22–5	13–1	13
Indiana University Bloomington	Big Ten	17–13	8–8	9
Kent State University	MAC	20–10	13–3	14
Liberty University	Big South Conference	23–7	13–1	14
Louisiana Tech University	WAC	25–4	17–1	5
Norfolk State University	MEAC	22–8	13–5	16
Oakland University	Mid-Continent	17–13	8–6	16
University of Oklahoma	Big 12	27–3	14–2	1
Old Dominion University	Colonial	25–5	18–0	7
Pepperdine University	West Coast Conference	23–7	11–3	8
Southern University	SWAC	26–4	17–1	14
Saint Francis University	Northeast Conference	19–11	14–4	16
Saint Peter's College	MAAC	25–5	15–3	11
Stephen F. Austin State University	Southland	24–5	19–1	13
Temple University	Atlantic 10	20–10	12–4	14
University of California, Santa Barbara	Big West Conference	25–5	16–0	12
Vanderbilt University	SEC	27–6	10–4	1
Weber State University	Big Sky Conference	22–8	11–3	15

== Qualifying teams – at-large ==
Thirty-three additional teams were selected to complete the sixty-four invitations.

At-large Bids
		Record		
Qualifying School	Conference	Regular Season	Conference	Seed
University of Arkansas	Southeastern	19–11	7–7	6
Baylor University	Big 12	26–5	12–4	2
Boston College	Big East	23–7	12–4	5
Clemson University	Atlantic Coast	17–11	9–7	11
University of Colorado Boulder	Big 12	21–9	11–5	3
Colorado State University	Mountain West	24–6	12–2	7
Drake University	Missouri Valley	23–7	15–3	7
University of Florida	Southeastern	18–10	8–6	6
University of Georgia	Southeastern	19–10	6–8	10
University of Iowa	Big Ten	17–10	10–6	9
Iowa State University	Big 12	23–8	9–7	3
Kansas State University	Big 12	24–7	11–5	3
Louisiana State University	Southeastern	17–11	8–6	6
University of Minnesota	Big Ten	21–7	11–5	5
Mississippi State University	Southeastern	18–11	8–6	12
University of New Mexico	Mountain West	22–8	10–4	10
University of North Carolina at Chapel Hill	Atlantic Coast	24–8	11–5	4
University of Notre Dame	Big East	19–9	13–3	7
Pennsylvania State University	Big Ten	21–11	11–5	4
Purdue University	Big Ten	23–5	13–3	2
Santa Clara University	West Coast	21–9	9–5	11
University of South Carolina	Southeastern	22–6	10–4	3
Stanford University	Pacific-10	30–2	18–0	2
Syracuse University	Big East	18–12	9–7	10
Texas Christian University	Conference USA	23–6	12–2	8
University of Tennessee	Southeastern	25–4	13–1	2
University of Texas at Austin	Big 12	20–9	10–6	4
Texas Tech University	Big 12	18–11	8–8	4
Tulane University	Conference USA	23–10	8–6	10
University of Nevada, Las Vegas	Mountain West	23–7	9–5	12
Villanova University	Big East	19–10	12–4	9
University of Virginia	Atlantic Coast	17–12	9–7	8
University of Wisconsin–Madison	Big Ten	19–11	8–8	8

== Bids by conference ==
Thirty-one conferences earned an automatic bid. In twenty-one cases, the automatic bid was the only representative from the conference. Thirty-three additional at-large teams were selected from ten of the conferences.

Bids	Conference	Teams
8	Southeastern	Vanderbilt, Arkansas, Florida, Georgia, LSU, Mississippi State, South Carolina, Tennessee
7	Big 12	Oklahoma, Baylor, Colorado, Iowa State, Kansas State, Texas, Texas Tech
6	Big Ten	Indiana, Iowa, Minnesota, Penn State, Purdue, Wisconsin
5	Big East	Connecticut, Boston College, Notre Dame, Syracuse, Villanova
4	Atlantic Coast	Duke, Clemson, North Carolina, Virginia
4	Mountain West	BYU, Colorado State, New Mexico, UNLV
3	Conference USA	Cincinnati, TCU, Tulane
2	Missouri Valley	Creighton, Drake
2	Pacific-10	Arizona State, Stanford
2	West Coast	Pepperdine, Santa Clara
1	America East	Hartford
1	Atlantic 10	Temple
1	Atlantic Sun	Georgia State
1	Big Sky	Weber State
1	Big South	Liberty
1	Big West	UC Santa Barbara
1	Colonial	Old Dominion
1	Horizon	Green Bay
1	Ivy	Harvard
1	Metro Atlantic	Saint Peter’s
1	Mid-American	Kent State
1	Mid-Continent	Oakland
1	Mid-Eastern	Norfolk State
1	Northeast	Saint Francis (PA)
1	Ohio Valley	Austin Peay
1	Patriot	Bucknell
1	Southern	Chattanooga
1	Southland	Stephen F. Austin
1	Southwestern	Southern U.
1	Sun Belt	FIU
1	Western Athletic	Louisiana Tech

== 2002 NCAA tournament schedule and venues ==
2002 NCAA NCAA first and second round venues
2002 NCAA regionals and Final Four

In 2002, the field remained at 64 teams. The teams were seeded, and assigned to four geographic regions, with seeds 1-16 in each region. In Round 1, seeds 1 and 16 faced each other, as well as seeds 2 and 15, seeds 3 and 14, seeds 4 and 13, seeds 5 and 12, seeds 6 and 11, seeds 7 and 10, and seeds 8 and 9. In the first two rounds, the top four seeds were given the opportunity to host the first-round game. In all cases, the higher seed accepted the opportunity.

First and Second rounds

The following table lists the region, host school, venue and the sixteen first and second round locations:

- March 15 and 17
  - East Region
    - Frank Erwin Center, Austin, Texas (Host: University of Texas at Austin)
    - Cameron Indoor Stadium, Durham, North Carolina (Host: Duke University)
    - Ferrell Center, Waco, Texas (Host: Baylor University)
  - Mideast Region
    - Bryce Jordan Center, State College, Pennsylvania (Host: Pennsylvania State University)
    - Bramlage Coliseum, Manhattan, Kansas (Host: Kansas State University)
  - Midwest Region
    - Thompson–Boling Arena, Knoxville, Tennessee (Host: University of Tennessee)
  - West Region
    - CU Events Center, Boulder, Colorado (Host: University of Colorado Boulder)
    - United Spirit Arena, Lubbock, Texas (Host: Texas Tech University)
- March 16 and 18
  - East Region
    - Carolina Coliseum, Columbia, South Carolina (Host: University of South Carolina)
  - Mideast Region
    - Mackey Arena, West Lafayette, Indiana (Host: Purdue University)
    - Harry A. Gampel Pavilion, Storrs, Connecticut (Host: University of Connecticut)
  - Midwest Region
    - Carmichael Auditorium, Chapel Hill, North Carolina (Host: University of North Carolina at Chapel Hill)
    - Memorial Gymnasium, Nashville, Tennessee (Host: Vanderbilt University)
    - Hilton Coliseum, Ames, Iowa (Host: Iowa State University)
  - West Region
    - Lloyd Noble Center, Norman, Oklahoma (Host: University of Oklahoma)
    - Maples Pavilion, Stanford, California (Host: Stanford University)

Regional semifinals and finals

The Regionals, named for the general location, were held from March 23 to March 25 at these sites:

- March 23 and 25
  - Midwest Regional, Hilton Coliseum, Ames, Iowa (Host: Iowa State University)
  - East Regional, Raleigh Entertainment & Sports Arena, Raleigh, North Carolina (Host: North Carolina State University)
  - Mideast Regional, U.S. Cellular Arena, Milwaukee, Wisconsin (Host: Marquette University)
  - West Regional, BSU Pavilion, Boise, Idaho (Host: Boise State University)

Each regional winner advanced to the Final Four held March 29 and March 31 in San Antonio, Texas at the Alamodome, (Host: University of Texas at San Antonio)

== Bids by state ==
The sixty-four teams came from thirty states. Texas had the most teams with five bids. Twenty states did not have any teams receiving bids.

NCAA Women's basketball Tournament invitations by state 2002

Bids	State	Teams
5	Pennsylvania	Bucknell, Temple, Penn State, Saint Francis, Villanova
5	Texas	Stephen F. Austin, Baylor, TCU, Texas, Texas Tech
4	California	Pepperdine, UC Santa Barbara, Santa Clara, Stanford
4	Louisiana	Louisiana Tech, Southern U., LSU, Tulane
4	Tennessee	Austin Peay, Chattanooga, Vanderbilt, Tennessee
4	Virginia	Liberty, Norfolk State, Old Dominion, Virginia
3	Indiana	Indiana, Notre Dame, Purdue
3	Iowa	Drake, Iowa, Iowa State
2	Colorado	Colorado, Colorado State
2	Connecticut	Connecticut, Hartford
2	Florida	FIU, Florida
2	Georgia	Georgia State, Georgia
2	Massachusetts	Harvard, Boston College
2	North Carolina	Duke, North Carolina
2	Ohio	Cincinnati, Kent State
2	South Carolina	Clemson, South Carolina
2	Utah	BYU, Weber State
2	Wisconsin	Green Bay, Wisconsin
1	Arizona	Arizona State
1	Arkansas	Arkansas
1	Kansas	Kansas State
1	Michigan	Oakland
1	Minnesota	Minnesota
1	Mississippi	Mississippi State
1	Nebraska	Creighton
1	Nevada	UNLV
1	New Jersey	Saint Peter’s
1	New Mexico	New Mexico
1	New York	Syracuse
1	Oklahoma	Oklahoma

== Brackets ==
Data Source

* – Denotes overtime period

=== Mideast Region – Milwaukee, Wisconsin ===
First round March 15–16
1	Connecticut	86
16	Saint Francis	37
Storrs, Connecticut – Sat/Mon
8	Virginia	62
9	Iowa	69
5	Florida International	73
12	Creighton	58
State College, Pennsylvania – Fri/Sun
4	Penn State	82
13	Chattanooga	67
6	Arkansas	78
11	Clemson	68
Manhattan, Kansas – Fri/Sun
3	Kansas State	93
14	Kent State	65
7	Old Dominion	68
10	Georgia	54
West Lafayette, Indiana – Sat/Mon
2	Purdue	80
15	Austin Peay	49

Second round March 17–18
1	Connecticut	86
9	Iowa	48
5	Florida International	79
4	Penn State	96
6	Arkansas	68
3	Kansas State	82
7	Old Dominion	74*
2	Purdue	70

Regional semifinals March 23
1	Connecticut	82
4	Penn State	64
3	Kansas State	62
7	Old Dominion	82

Regional finals March 25
1	Connecticut	85
7	Old Dominion	64

=== Midwest Region – Ames, Iowa ===
First round March 15–16
1	Vanderbilt	63
16	Oakland	38
Nashville, Tennessee – Sat/Mon
8	Wisconsin	70
9	Arizona State	73
5	Minnesota	71
12	UNLV	54
Chapel Hill, North Carolina – Sat/Mon
4	North Carolina	85
13	Harvard	58
6	Florida	52
11	BYU	90
Ames, Iowa – Sat/Mon
3	Iowa State	72
14	Temple	57
7	Notre Dame	71
10	New Mexico	61
Knoxville, Tennessee – Fri/Sun
2	Tennessee	98
15	Georgia State	68

Second round March 17–18
1	Vanderbilt	61
9	Arizona State	35
5	Minnesota	69
4	North Carolina	72
11	BYU	75
3	Iowa State	69
7	Notre Dame	50
2	Tennessee	89

Regional semifinals March 23
1	Vanderbilt	70
4	North Carolina	61
11	BYU	57
2	Tennessee	68

Regional finals March 25
1	Vanderbilt	63
2	Tennessee	68

=== West Region – Boise, Idaho ===
First round March 15–16
1	Oklahoma	84
16	Hartford	52
Norman, Oklahoma – Sat/Mon
8	Pepperdine	46
9	Villanova	67
5	Boston College	59
12	Mississippi State	65
Lubbock, Texas – Fri/Sun
4	Texas Tech	84
13	Stephen F. Austin	63
6	LSU	84
11	Santa Clara	78
Boulder, Colorado – Fri/Sun
3	Colorado	88
14	Southern	61
7	Colorado State	69
10	Tulane	73
Stanford, California – Sat/Mon
2	Stanford	76
15	Weber State	51

Second round March 17–18
1	Oklahoma	66
9	Villanova	53
12	Mississippi State	55
4	Texas Tech	77
6	LSU	58
3	Colorado	69
10	Tulane	55
2	Stanford	77

Regional semifinals March 23
1	Oklahoma	72
4	Texas Tech	62
3	Colorado	62
2	Stanford	59

Regional finals March 25
1	Oklahoma	94
3	Colorado	60

=== East Region – Raleigh, North Carolina ===
First round March 15–16
1	Duke	95
16	Norfolk State	48
Durham, North Carolina – Fri/Sun
8	TCU	55
9	Indiana	45
5	Louisiana Tech	56
12	UC Santa Barbara	57
Austin, Texas – Fri/Sun
4	Texas	60
13	Green Bay	55
6	Cincinnati	76*
11	Saint Peter's	63
Columbia, South Carolina – Sat/Mon
3	South Carolina	69
14	Liberty	61
7	Drake	87
10	Syracuse	69
Waco, Texas – Fri/Sun
2	Baylor	80
15	Bucknell	56

Second round March 17–18
1	Duke	76
8	TCU	66
12	UC Santa Barbara	60
4	Texas	76
6	Cincinnati	56
3	South Carolina	75
7	Drake	76
2	Baylor	72

Regional semifinals March 23
1	Duke	62
4	Texas	46
3	South Carolina	79
7	Drake	65

Regional finals March 25
1	Duke	77
3	South Carolina	68

=== Final Four – San Antonio, Texas ===
National semifinals March 29
ME1	Connecticut	79
MW2	Tennessee	56
W1	Oklahoma	86
E1	Duke	71

National championship March 31
ME1	Connecticut	82
W1	Oklahoma	70

E-East; ME-Mideast; MW-Midwest; W-West

== Record by conference ==
Conference	# of Bids	Record	Win %	Round of 32	Sweet Sixteen	Elite Eight	Final Four	Championship Game
Southeastern	8	13–8	.619	6	3	3	1	0
Big 12	7	16–7	.696	7	5	2	1	1
Big Ten	6	5–6	.455	4	1	0	0	0
Big East	5	8–4	.667	3	1	1	1	1
Atlantic Coast	4	6–4	.600	2	2	1	1	0
Mountain West	4	2–4	.333	1	1	0	0	0
Conference USA	3	3–3	.500	3	0	0	0	0
Pacific-10	2	3–2	.600	2	1	0	0	0
Missouri Valley	2	2–2	.500	1	1	0	0	0
West Coast	2	0–2	.000	0	0	0	0	0
Colonial	1	3–1	.750	1	1	1	0	0
Big West	1	1–1	.500	1	0	0	0	0
Sun Belt	1	1–1	.500	1	0	0	0	0

Eighteen conferences went 0–1: America East, Atlantic 10, Atlantic Sun, Big Sky, Big South, Horizon League, Ivy League, MAAC, MAC, Mid-Continent, MEAC, Northeast, Ohio Valley, Patriot League, Southern, Southland, SWAC, and WAC

== All-Tournament team ==
- Swin Cash, Connecticut
- Sue Bird, Connecticut
- Asjha Jones, Connecticut
- Stacey Dales, Oklahoma
- Rosalind Ross, Oklahoma

== Game officials ==
- Dennis DeMayo (semifinal)
- Barb Smith (semifinal)
- Bryan Enterline (semifinal)
- Sally Bell (semifinal)
- Lawson Newton (semifinal)
- Angie Lewis (semifinal)
- Scott Yarbrough (final)
- Melissa Barlow (final)
- Lisa Mattingly (final)

== See also ==
- NCAA Women's Division I Basketball Championship
- 2002 NCAA Division I men's basketball tournament
- 2002 NAIA Division I men's basketball tournament
