= Joanne Boyle =

American basketball player and coach

Biographical details
- Born: November 1, 1963 (age 62); Philadelphia, Pennsylvania, U.S.

Playing career
- 1981–1985: Duke

Coaching career (HC unless noted)
- 1993–2002: Duke (Asst.)
- 2002–2005: Richmond
- 2005–2011: California
- 2011–2018: Virginia

Head coaching record
- Overall: 333–192 (.634)

Joanne Boyle (born November 1, 1963) is the former head coach of the University of Virginia women's basketball team. Prior to joining the Cavaliers, Boyle served as the head coach of the California Golden Bears women's basketball team. Boyle played her collegiate basketball for the Duke Blue Devils basketball program.

== Playing career ==
Boyle, a four-year letterwinner at Duke, graduated in 1985 with a degree in economics and obtained a Master of Science degree in health policy and administration from North Carolina in 1989. She ended her playing career ranked second at Duke in both scoring and in assists. Her 75 steals during the 1984-85 campaign remained the highest single-season total until Alana Beard broke the mark in 2000–01. After Duke University, Boyle played professional basketball overseas for three years in Luxembourg and Germany. During her European stay, she won two league championships.

== Duke statistics ==
Legend
GP	Games played	GS	Games started	MPG	Minutes per game
FG%	Field goal percentage	3P%	3-point field goal percentage	FT%	Free throw percentage
RPG	Rebounds per game	APG	Assists per game	SPG	Steals per game
BPG	Blocks per game	PPG	Points per game	**Bold**	Career high

	Team	GP	Points	FG%	3P%	FT%	RPG	APG	SPG	BPG	PPG
1981-82	Duke	20	21	28.1%	0.0%	42.9%	1.0	0.2	0.0	0.0	1.1
1982-83	Duke	20	66	37.7%	0.0%	66.7%	2.1	0.6	0.5	0.1	3.3
1983-84	Duke	**27**	153	36.1%	0.0%	**74.5%**	3.0	1.3	1.0	0.2	5.7
1984-85	Duke	**27**	**361**	**47.6%**	0.0%	65.6%	**3.1**	**3.0**	**2.8**	**0.7**	**13.4**
Career		94	601	42.2%	0.0%	67.6%	2.4	1.4	1.2	0.3	6.4

== Coaching career ==
Boyle was hired at Cal on April 15, 2005, after serving three seasons as head coach at Richmond. While at California, her teams emerged as one of the Pac-10's statistical leaders. In 2007–08, Cal ranked among the top-five teams in 13 categories for the second straight season and was No. 1 in four areas. For the third consecutive year, Cal established school records for field goal percentage defense (35.1%, 1st Pac-10) and scoring defense (54.3 ppg, all-time Pac-10 record). Cal's 155 three-pointers made in 2007–08 broke the previous school record of 135, established in 1995–96. During her first Cal season in 2005–06, Boyle led a freshman-dominated Bears team to an 18–12 overall record, a sixth-place showing in the Pac-10 (10–8) and the school's first NCAA Tournament bid since 1993.

During the 2009–10 season, Boyle guided the Bears to their first title in the WNIT, defeating the Miami Hurricanes 73–61 at the Bears' home court in Haas Pavilion.

On April 2, 2010, USA Basketball announced that Boyle was appointed to its board of directors for 2009–2012. The committee is responsible for selecting coaches and athletes for USA Basketball college-aged competitions including the U19 FIBA World Championships.

On March 20, 2018, Boyle announced her retirement from coaching after seven years as the head coach of the University of Virginia's women's team, citing a "family matter." She later revealed to The Washington Post that she had to step down in order to finalize the adoption of her 6-year-old Senegalese daughter Ngoty. Boyle revealed she had to travel Senegal with her daughter for required paperwork, a process that was expected to last a minimum of several months but could possibly last several years. After a total of 15 trips to Senegal, Boyle was able to finalize the adoption, and Ngoty was granted U. S. citizenship upon her permanent return on August 30, 2019.

== Head coaching record ==
Record table
Season	Team	Overall	Conference	Standing	Postseason
**Richmond** (Atlantic 10 Conference) (2002–2005)
2002–03	Richmond	21–11	9–7	3rd	WNIT Quarterfinals
2003–04	Richmond	23–10	11–5	2nd	WNIT Semifinals
2004–05	Richmond	23–8	12–4	3rd	NCAA 1st Round
Richmond:		67–29 (.698)	32–16 (.667)		
**California** (Pacific-10 Conference) (2005–2011)
2005–06	California	18–12	12–6	6th	NCAA 1st Round
2006–07	California	23–9	12–6	3rd	NCAA 1st Round
2007–08	California	27–7	15–3	2nd	NCAA 2nd Round
2008–09	California	27–7	15–3	2nd	NCAA Sweet Sixteen
2009–10	California	24–13	11–7	4th	WNIT Champions
2010–11	California	18–16	7–11	6th	WNIT 2nd Round
California:		137–64 (.682)	72–26 (.735)		
**Virginia** (Atlantic Coast Conference) (2011–2018)
2011–12	Virginia	25–11	9–7	6th	WNIT Quarterfinals
2012–13	Virginia	16–14	8–10	6th	
2013–14	Virginia	14–17	6–10	10th	
2014–15	Virginia	17–14	7–9	T-9th	WNIT 1st Round
2015–16	Virginia	18–16	6–10	T-9th	WNIT 3rd Round
2016–17	Virginia	20–13	7–9	8th	WNIT 2nd Round
2017–18	Virginia	19–14	10–6	T-6th	NCAA 2nd Round
Virginia:		129–99 (.566)	53–61 (.465)		
Total:		333–192 (.634)			
National champion Postseason invitational champion Conference regular season champion Conference regular season and conference tournament champion Division regular season champion Division regular season and conference tournament champion Conference tournament champion

== Career highlights ==
- 2007–08 Russell Athletic/WBCA Region 8 Coach of the Year and 2006-07 Pac-10 Coach of the Year
- Joined Gooch Foster (1991–92) and Caren Horstmeyer (2003–04) as Cal's women's basketball coaches who earned Pac-10 Coach of the Year
- Cal's 68 wins in three seasons under Joanne Boyle are more than the Bears posted in the previous six years (63) prior to her arrival in Berkeley.
- Owns the best winning percentage (.708) of any of the eight women's basketball coaches in Cal history
- Surpassed the 1983-84 Bears (24-8) for the school record for wins in a season in 2007–08 (27-7)
- Directed Cal to the best Pac-10 finish (2nd) and to the Bears' best Pac-10 record (15-3) in program history in 2007–08
- In 2007-08, led Cal to the Pac-10 Tournament final for the first time and a school-best No. 8 national ranking in the Associated Press and coaches' polls
- Guided Cal to five ranked wins in three seasons, including a victory over No. 8 Stanford in 2006–07 and No. 18 Vanderbilt in 2007–08
- Coached the 2006–07 Pac-10 Player of the Year (Devanei Hampton) and the 2005–06 Pac-10 Freshman of the Year (Alexis Gray-Lawson)
- Her players have earned All-Pac-10 honors eight times and Pac-10 All-Freshman accolades seven times
- Coached two All-Americans (Devanei Hampton and Ashley Walker)
- 2006 USA Under-20 National team assistant coach
- 2010 WNIT Champion

== Health ==
In November 2001, while an assistant coach at Duke University, Boyle suffered a cerebral hemorrhage. She made a recovery, and returned to coaching in early 2002.

== Awards and honors ==
- 2007–08 Russell Athletic/WBCA Region 8 Coach of the Year
- Member of the WBCA Board of Directors
- 2011—Carol Eckman Award
