= Rosalind Ross =

American basketball player (1980–2010)

Personal information
- Born: January 17, 1980 Milwaukee, Wisconsin, U.S.
- Died: September 15, 2010 (aged 30) Milwaukee, Wisconsin, U.S.
- Listed height: 5 ft 9 in (1.75 m)
- Listed weight: 160 lb (73 kg)

Career information
- High school: Bradley Tech (Milwaukee, Wisconsin)
- College: Northeastern Oklahoma A&M (1998–2000); Oklahoma (2000–2002)
- WNBA draft: 2002: 1st round, 16th overall pick
- Drafted by: Los Angeles Sparks
- Position: Guard
- Number: 33
- Stats at Basketball Reference

Rosalind Chanette Ross (January 17, 1980 – September 15, 2010) was an American basketball player drafted by the Los Angeles Sparks of the WNBA. On September 15, 2010, she was shot and killed by her long time partner.

== Career ==
Ross was a standout player at Milwaukee Technical High School. She then was a Junior College All-American for two years at Northeastern Oklahoma A&M College, then transferred to the University of Oklahoma. In 2002, despite being sidelined with knee surgery, the Los Angeles Sparks picked her in the First Round of the WNBA draft. Ross never played a game in the WNBA, and was released by the Sparks in May 2003.

== Honors ==
=== University of Oklahoma Sooners ===
- All-Big 12 Tournament team, 2001

=== Oklahoma statistics ===
Legend
GP	Games played	GS	Games started	MPG	Minutes per game
FG%	Field goal percentage	3P%	3-point field goal percentage	FT%	Free throw percentage
RPG	Rebounds per game	APG	Assists per game	SPG	Steals per game
BPG	Blocks per game	PPG	Points per game	**Bold**	Career high

Year	Team	GP	Points	FG%	3P%	FT%	RPG	APG	SPG	BPG	PPG
2000–01	Oklahoma	34	287	**43.7%**	**39.7%**	75.0%	3.1	1.8	1.2	0.1	8.4
2001–02	Oklahoma	**36**	**416**	39.9%	36.2%	**82.1%**	**5.3**	**2.2**	**1.7**	**0.3**	**11.6**
Career		70	703	41.3%	37.5%	78.3%	4.2	2.0	1.5	0.2	10.0

=== Northeastern Oklahoma A&M Lady Norse ===
- Two-time Junior College All-American, 1999, 2000
- Two-time Junior College All-Conference, 1999, 2000

== Personal life ==
Ross majored in sociology. After basketball Ross worked as a security guard for Briggs & Stratton.

In 2010, Ross was shot and killed on Milwaukee's North Side, while waiting in the drive-thru of a fast food restaurant, by Malika Willoughby, her female partner since they were teenagers. Ross had just informed Willoughby that she had accepted a job as a recruiter with the Oklahoma Sooners and would be leaving without her. Willoughby was sentenced to 13 years in prison in 2011.
