= Stacey Dales =

Canadian basketball player and sports reporter (born 1979)

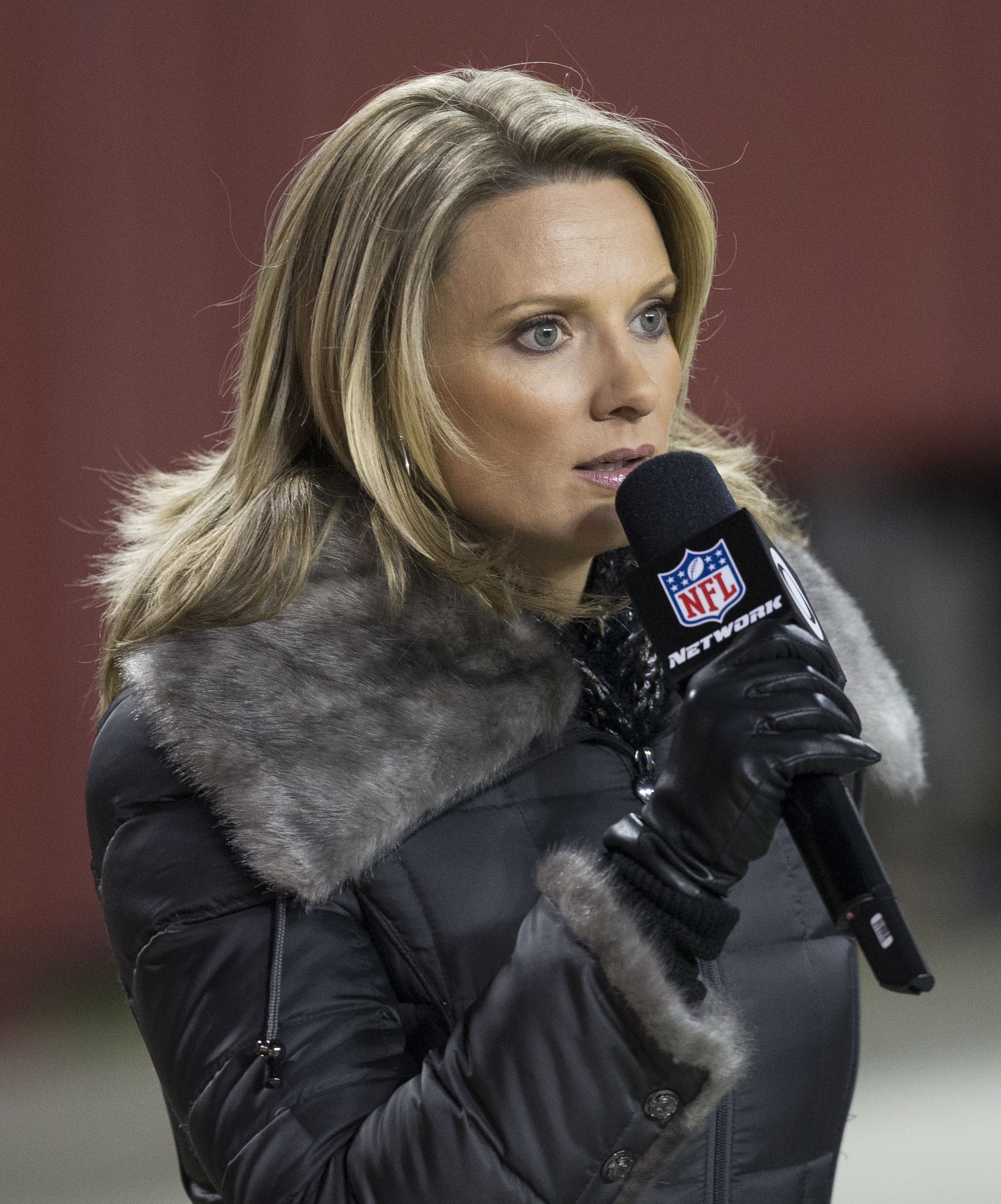
- Dales in 2014

Personal information
- Born: September 5, 1979 (age 46) Collingwood, Ontario, Canada
- Listed height: 6 ft 0 in (1.83 m)

Career information
- High school: Thousand Islands Secondary School (Brockville, Ontario)
- College: Oklahoma (1998–2002)
- WNBA draft: 2002: 1st round, 3rd overall pick
- Drafted by: Washington Mystics
- Playing career: 2002–2007
- Position: Shooting guard / small forward
- Number: 21, 12

Career history
- 2002–2004: Washington Mystics
- 2006–2007: Chicago Sky

Career highlights
- WNBA All-Star (2002); Women's Basketball Academic All-American of the Year (2002); 2× First-team All-American – AP (2001, 2002); 2× All-American – USBWA (2001, 2002); 2× Kodak All-American (2001, 2002); 2× Big 12 Player of the Year (2001, 2002); Big 12 Tournament Most Outstanding Player (2002); 2× First-team All-Big 12 (2001, 2002)
- Stats at Basketball Reference

Stacey Dales (born September 5, 1979) is a Canadian-American former basketball player and a current reporter on the NFL Network. Dales was born in Collingwood, Ontario, and raised in Brockville, Ontario.

== Basketball career ==
=== High school ===
Before attending the University of Oklahoma, she attended Thousand Islands Secondary School (TISS) and Dales was a star for the TISS Pirates ladies basketball team during her high school years, Dales was a major reason why TISS captured three consecutive Ontario ‘AA’ high school senior girls basketball championships 1994, 1995 & 1996.

=== College ===
After graduating in 1997 she attended the University of Oklahoma, Dales made an Olympic appearance for Canada in 2000 and was a first team All-American in 2001 and 2002. She was named the 2001 and 2002 Big 12 Conference Player of the Year and is the Big 12 all-time career assist leader (764). In 2002, she was the all-sports Academic All-American of the Year. She was the first Oklahoma player to record 1,700 points, 600 rebounds and 700 assists. During her senior year she led the Sooners to the NCAA Championship game where they lost to Connecticut.

=== WNBA ===
Dales was drafted third overall in 2002 by the Washington Mystics, the highest pick ever for a Canadian. That year she was named to the All-Star team as a replacement. When she was with Washington, she was diagnosed with Raynaud's phenomenon in her hands. In 2004, she announced her retirement from the league for the first time.

After a one-year retirement, Dales joined the Chicago Sky, who picked her in the expansion draft of 2006 after Washington left her unprotected. On April 5, 2008, Dales announced her retirement from the WNBA for the second time. She ranked 4th in the WNBA for 3-pointers made (62) and 2nd in 3-point attempts (201) in 2007.

== Television ==
From 2002-2008, Dales served as a men's and women's college basketball analyst, as well as a sideline reporter for college football and the NBA, on ESPN. Dales was the first woman at ESPN to work as an in-studio men's basketball analyst. In August 2009 the NFL Network announced that it hired Dales to serve as host and national reporter/correspondent for NFL Media Programming. Dales is currently in her tenth year, entering her eleventh NFL season, with the NFL Network. For the 2010 Winter Olympics in Vancouver, Dales was hired by NBC Universal Sports to work as a correspondent. Dales has also served as a sideline reporter for TNT covering primetime NBA games as well as for CBS covering primetime NFL games. In 2018 and 2019 Dales was hired as a brand ambassador and spokesperson for Phillips 66 in connection with its long running partnership with the Big 12 Basketball Tournament. In 2018, Fox Sports announced that it hired Dales to serve as color analyst for women's college basketball coverage for the 2018–2019 season.

== Career statistics ==
Legend
GP	Games played	GS	Games started	MPG	Minutes per game	RPG	Rebounds per game
APG	Assists per game	SPG	Steals per game	BPG	Blocks per game	PPG	Points per game
TO	Turnovers per game	FG%	Field-goal percentage	3P%	3-point field-goal percentage	FT%	Free-throw percentage
**Bold**	Career best	°	League leader

=== WNBA ===
==== Regular season ====
WNBA regular season statistics
Year	Team	GP	GS	MPG	FG%	3P%	FT%	RPG	APG	SPG	BPG	TO	PPG
2002	Washington	31	28	26.0	40.4	**39.4**	74.0	2.6	2.7	0.5	0.1	2.2	9.8
2003	Washington	**34**	**31**	**29.4**	**40.9**	35.6	70.9	**3.0**	**3.4**	**0.9**	**0.4**	2.1	10.0
2004	Washington	31	26	25.2	38.2	33.6	72.7	2.1	2.5	0.6	0.1	**1.2**	8.2
2005	Did not play (retired)												
2006	Chicago	23	16	19.7	35.4	30.9	69.6	1.2	1.7	0.4	0.0	1.4	7.0
2007	Chicago	31	30	27.3	34.7	33.8	**84.6**	1.8	2.7	0.6	0.0	1.8	**10.3**
**Career**	5 years, 2 teams	150	131	25.9	38.0	34.8	73.9	2.2	2.7	0.6	0.1	1.8	9.2
**Career**	All-Star	1	0	10.9	20.0	33.3	—	3.0	0.0	0.0	0.0	0.0	3.0

==== Playoffs ====
WNBA playoff statistics
Year	Team	GP	GS	MPG	FG%	3P%	FT%	RPG	APG	SPG	BPG	TO	PPG
2002	Washington	**5**	**5**	19.6	**43.3**	**44.4**	**100.0**	1.6	**3.2**	0.4	0.0	**1.0**	7.6
2004	Washington	3	3	**29.0**	40.0	11.1	66.7	**5.0**	1.7	**0.7**	0.0	2.7	**9.0**
**Career**	2 years, 1 team	8	8	23.1	42.0	33.3	73.7	2.9	2.6	0.5	0.0	1.6	8.1

=== College ===
NCAA statistics
Year	Team	GP	Points	FG%	3P%	FT%	RPG	APG	SPG	BPG	PPG
1998–99	Oklahoma	29	346	39.0	31.2	66.0	6.9	5.2	1.3	**0.6**	11.9
1999–00	Oklahoma	33	420	41.2	35.2	61.7	5.1	5.8	1.9	0.3	12.7
2000–01	Oklahoma	34	543	**47.6**	32.6	66.0	**5.1**	**7.3**	**2.4**	0.1	16.0
2001–02	Oklahoma	**36**	**611**	47.6	**38.7**	**78.6**	5.0	4.9	1.8	0.3	**17.0**
**Career**		132	1920	44.4	34.8	68.7	5.5	5.8	1.9	0.3	14.5

== Personal life ==
Dales' brother Burke played 10 seasons in the Canadian Football League, retiring in 2014. Her cousin, Jason Arnott, played 18 seasons in the NHL, retiring in 2013.

Dales was inducted into Brockville's Hall of Fame in June 2016, alongside her brother Burke.
